= List of Kamen Rider 555 characters =

Kamen Rider 555 (仮面ライダー555(ファイズ), Kamen Raidā Faizu) is a Japanese tokusatsu series that serves as the 13th installment in the Kamen Rider franchise and the fourth entry in the Heisei era. The series follows loner, Takumi Inui, and Yuji Kiba, who died and became a monstrous Orphnoch, and their newfound friends as they become involved in a conflict between Smart Brain, Inc., a group of Orphnoch who seek to exterminate humanity, and alumni of the Ryusei School, who were charged with stopping the corporation with technology they are unable to use.

== Main characters ==
=== Takumi Inui ===
Takumi Inui (乾 巧, Inui Takumi) is a mysterious loner who became the Wolf Orphnoch (ウルフオルフェノク, Urufu Orufenoku) after being hit by a car when he was a child. He attempted to use his newfound powers to protect people, but his failure to save the Ryusei School reunion from Kitazaki and an implanted memory that made him believe he was the culprit, forcing Takumi to isolate himself from others out of fear of betraying them and forget that he became an Orphnoch. By chance, he encounters Mari Sonoda and follows her under the belief that the Faiz Gear (ファイズギア, Faizu Gia) she was carrying in a case was stolen from her days earlier. As a result, he reluctantly becomes involved in her crusade to fight the Orphnochs as Kamen Rider Faiz. Amidst conflicts with Masato Kusaka and Yuji Kiba, Takumi accepts his role as Faiz and joins the latter in protecting humans. Eventually, Takumi remembers his true nature as an Orphnoch and learns the truth behind the Ryusei School massacre before settling his rivalry with Yuji while defeating the Arch Orphnoch together.

As the Wolf Orphnoch, Takumi possesses increased power compared to most original and/or sired Orphnochs as well as superhuman speed and agility.

Utilizing the Faiz Phone (ファイズフォン, Faizu Fon) in conjunction with the Faiz Driver (ファイズドライバー, Faizu Doraibā) belt, Takumi can transform into Kamen Rider Faiz. While transformed, he carries a variety of gadgets from the Faiz Gear that can be reconfigured into varying forms, such as the Faiz Pointer (ファイズポインター, Faizu Pointā) that changes from Digital Torchlight Mode (デジタルトーチライトモード, Dejitaru Tōchiraito Mōdo) to Kick Mode (キックモード, Kikku Mōdo) and the Faiz Shot (ファイズショット, Faizu Shotto) that changes from Multi Digital Camera Mode (マルチデジタルカメラモード, Maruchi Dejitaru Kamera Mōdo) to Knuckle Mode (ナックルモード, Nakkuru Mōdo). His personal vehicle is the Auto Vajin (オートバジン, Ōto Bajin) motorcycle, which stores the Faiz Edge (ファイズエッジ, Faizu Ejji) sword as a handlebar and can transform into a humanoid support robot to aid him in battle. His Exceed Charge (エクシードチャージ, Ekushīdo Chāji) finishers are the Crimson Smash (クリムゾンスマッシュ, Kurimuzon Sumasshu) via the Faiz Pointer, the Grand Impact (グランインパクト, Guran Inpakuto) via the Faiz Shot, and the Sparkle Cut (スパークルカット, Supākuru Katto) via the Faiz Edge.

Later in the series, Takumi acquires advanced gadgets from the Faiz Gear that allow him to assume the following power-up forms:

- Axel Form (アクセルフォーム, Akuseru Fōmu): Takumi's super form accessed from the stopwatch-like Faiz Axel (ファイズアクセル, Faizu Akuseru) bracelet that grants the use of the Axel Mode (アクセルモード, Akuseru Mōdo) ability, which has a 10 second time limit. He can also perform enhanced versions of his original Exceed Charges with the appropriate gadgets.
- Blaster Form (ブラスターフォーム, Burastā Fōmu): Takumi's final form accessed from the Faiz Phone in conjunction with the Faiz Blaster (ファイズブラスター, Faizu Burastā), which doubles as the Auto Vajin's trunk, that equips him with the Photon Field Floater (フォトンフィールドフローター, Foton Fīrudo Furōtā) jet pack, whose thrusters double as the twin shoulder-mounted Bloody Cannons (ブラッディ・キャノン, Buraddi Kyanon). He can also reconfigure the Faiz Blaster from its briefcase-like Trunk Box Mode (トランクボックスモード, Toranku Bokkusu Mōdo) to either its shotgun-like Photon Buster Mode (フォトンバスターモード, Foton Basutā Mōdo), which allows him to perform the Photon Buster (フォトンバスター, Foton Basutā) Exceed Charge, or its sword-like Photon Breaker Mode (フォトンブレイカーモード, Foton Bureikā Mōdo), which allows him to perform the Photon Breaker (フォトンブレイカー, Foton Bureikā) and Super Strengthen Crimson Smash (超強化クリムゾンスマッシュ, Chō Kyōka Kurimuzon Sumasshu) Exceed Charges.

During the events of the V-Cinema Kamen Rider 555 20th: Paradise Regained, Takumi utilizes the Faiz Phone 20 Plus (ファイズフォン20 Plus, Faizu Fon Tuenti Purasu) in conjunction with the Faiz Driver Next (ファイズドライバーNEXT, Faizu Doraibā Nekusuto) belt to transform into Kamen Rider Next Faiz (仮面ライダーネクストファイズ, Kamen Raidā Nekusuto Faizu), which has access to Axel Form.

Takumi Inui is portrayed by Kento Handa (半田 健人, Handa Kento).

=== Mari Sonoda ===
Mari Sonoda (園田 真理, Sonoda Mari) is a member of the Ryusei School who strives to see the good in others and dreams of becoming a beautician. Though she was sent the Faiz Gear and Auto Vajin by their foster father, Hanagata, she was unable to use them. After seeing Takumi Inui successfully use the equipment, she insists he accompany her in fighting the Orphnochs.

In an alternate timeline depicted in the film Kamen Rider 555: Paradise Lost, Sonoda serves as the leader of the Human Liberation Army (人間解放軍, Ningen Kaihō-gun), a guerilla force of anti-Orphnoch resistance fighters and the last known bastion of human resistance in an Orphnoch-dominated world.

During the events of the V-Cinema Kamen Rider 555 20th: Paradise Regained, Mari becomes the Wildcat Orphnoch (ワイルドキャットオルフェノク, Wairudokyatto Orufenoku) due to the activation of her implanted Orphnoch DNA by Smart Brain.

Mari Sonoda is portrayed by Yuria Haga (芳賀 優里亜, Haga Yuria). As a child, Mari is portrayed by Aoi Yūki (悠木 碧, Yūki Aoi).

=== Yuji Kiba ===
Yuji Kiba (木場 勇治, Kiba Yūji) is a friendly and polite young man who became the Horse Orphnoch (ホースオルフェノク, Hōsu Orufenoku) after dying in a car crash and ending up in a comatose state for two years. Upon awakening, Yuji discovers his uncle sold his family's company and his girlfriend Chie Morishita left him for his cousin Kazuaki Kiba. After murdering Kazuaki and Morishita in anger, Yuji turns to Smart Brain for protection, only to learn of their tactics and resolve to fight them and protect humans using his Orphnoch powers. In pursuit of this goal, he befriends Yuka Osada and Naoya Kaido, but forms a rivalry with Takumi Inui due to a misunderstanding until they learn each other's true identities and intentions. Upon learning of Yuka's death, who he believed was killed by the police, Yuji kills Masato Kusaka for the Kaixa Gear, discards his ideals, and eventually replaces Kyoji Murakami as the chairman of Smart Brain. However, Yuji's humanity is restored following a final battle with Takumi and he later sacrifices himself to help him defeat the Arch Orphnoch.

In an alternate timeline depicted in the film Kamen Rider 555: Paradise Lost, Yuji maintained his desire to protect humans from other Orphnochs until Osada and Naoya are killed by the Elasmotherium Orphnoch and Yuji is manipulated by Smart Brain into believing humanity had betrayed him. Accepting the Orga Gear (オーガギア, Ōga Gia), one of two "perfect" Rider Gears created by Smart Brain that can only be used by Orphnochs, he agrees to serve them as Kamen Rider Orga (仮面ライダーオーガ, Kamen Raidā Ōga) and fights Takumi, who eventually defeats Yuji and shows him the error of his ways. Yuji subsequently sacrifices himself to weaken the Elasmotherium Orphnoch so Takumi can kill it.

As the Horse Orphnoch, Yuji wields a sword and shield, and can assume an alternate centaur-themed Gallop Mode (疾走態, Shissō-tai). In the series finale and Paradise Lost, he evolves his Horse Orphnoch form into Raging Mode (激情態, Gekijō-tai) where he gains increased power.

Utilizing the Orga Phone (オーガフォン, Ōga Fon) in conjunction with the Orga Driver (オーガドライバー, Ōga Doraibā) belt, Yuji can transform into Kamen Rider Orga. While transformed, he wields the Orga Stlanzer (オーガストランザー, Ōga Sutoranzā), which can switch between Dagger Mode (短剣モード, Tanken Mōdo) and Longsword Mode (長剣モード, Chōken Mōdo). He can also use the Orga Stlanzer to perform the Orga Stlash (オーガストラッシュ, Ōga Sutorasshu) Exceed Charge.

Yuji Kiba was portrayed by Masayuki Izumi (泉 政行, Izumi Masayuki).

=== Masato Kusaka ===
Masato Kusaka (草加 雅人, Kusaka Masato) is a student of the Ryusei School and childhood friend of Mari Sonoda, having fallen in love with her after she saved him from bullies, and failed to attend the Ryusei School reunion. After learning of the massacre, he vowed to destroy the Orphnochs with extreme prejudice and wipe his hands of the blood he essentially spilled that night. To this end, he acquired the Kaixa Gear (カイザギア, Kaiza Gia), which can only be used by Orphnochs or humans implanted with a sufficient amount of Orphnoch DNA, and became Kamen Rider Kaixa (仮面ライダーカイザ, Kamen Raidā Kaiza), using his implanted Orphnoch DNA to survive the belt's fatal side effects longer than its past human users and developing a rivalry with Takumi Inui. Eventually, Masato begins to suffer from the Kaixa Gear's side effects before he is killed by Yuji Kiba.

In an alternate timeline depicted in the film Kamen Rider 555: Paradise Lost, Masato is killed by Kamen Rider Psyga.

During the events of the V-Cinema Kamen Rider 555 20th: Paradise Regained, an android modeled after Masato and programmed to kill alumni of the Ryusei School who became Orphnochs is sent by Smart Brain, only to be destroyed by Takumi Inui as Kamen Rider Faiz. A second android Masato takes the android Kitazaki's place after the latter's destruction.

Utilizing the Kaixa Phone (カイザフォン, Kaiza Fon) in conjunction with the Kaixa Driver (カイザドライバー, Kaiza Doraibā) belt, Masato can transform into Kamen Rider Kaixa. While transformed, he carries a variety of gadgets from the Kaixa Gear that can be reconfigured into varying forms, such as the Kaixa Pointer (カイザポインター, Kaiza Pointā) that similar to the Faiz Pointer changes from Binoculars Mode (双眼鏡モード, Sōgankyō Mōdo) to Kick Mode and the Kaixa Shot (カイザショット, Kaiza Shotto) that like the Faiz Shot changes from Multi Digital Camera Mode to Knuckle Mode. He also wields the Kaixa Blaygun (カイザブレイガン, Kaiza Bureigan), which can switch between Gun Mode (ガンモード, Gan Mōdo) and Blade Mode (ブレードモード, Burēdo Mōdo). His personal vehicle is the Side Basshar (サイドバッシャー, Saido Basshā) motorcycle/sidecar, which can transform into a walker-esque support robot to aid him in battle. His Exceed Charges are the Gold Smash (ゴルドスマッシュ, Gorudo Sumasshu) via the Kaixa Pointer, the Grand Impact via the Kaixa Shot, and the Kaixa Slash (カイザスラッシュ, Kaiza Surasshu) via the Kaixa Blaygun.

In Paradise Regained, the android Masato utilizes the Kaixa Phone XX (カイザフォンXX, Kaiza Fon Tuenti) in conjunction with the Kaixa Driver to transform into Kamen Rider Next Kaixa (仮面ライダーネクストカイザ, Kamen Raidā Nekusuto Kaiza), which like Next Faiz has access to Axel Form. While transformed, he dual wields the twin bladed Kaixa Crosslasher (カイザクロスラッシャー, Kaiza Kurosurasshā) tonfa.

Masato Kusaka is portrayed by Kohei Murakami (村上 幸平, Murakami Kōhei).

== Recurring characters ==
=== Orphnochs ===
Orphnochs (オルフェノク, Orufenoku) (Note: The term "Orphnoch" is derived from a combination of Orpheus and Enoch's names.) are humans reborn as grey animal or plant-themed zombie-like monsters who were meant to be the next stage in human evolution. Two types seen throughout the series are "original" Orphnochs, dead humans who are subsequently resurrected as monsters, and "sired" Orphnochs, humans who survive being attacked by an Orphnoch similarly to vampires and werewolves, though they are weaker than originals. While both types are capable of switching between their human and Orphnoch forms, they suffer from a genetic flaw that causes them to eventually and inevitably disintegrate due to the human body being unable to withstand such a rapid evolution, with the use of Rider Gears accelerating the process. Additionally, there exists a third type called "evolved" Orphnochs, who are genetically perfect and significantly more powerful, but lack the ability to turn back into their human forms and can only reach this stage with assistance from the Arch Orphnoch.

All Orphnochs share superhuman abilities and senses as well as the ability to produce tendrils capable of killing humans or converting them into more Orphnochs. Furthermore, they are capable of withstanding conventional firearms, with some capable of withstanding attacks by Rider Gear users.

In an alternate timeline depicted in the film Kamen Rider 555: Paradise Lost, Orphnochs were able to retain the use of their human forms while adapting away the genetic flaw that shortened their life spans after overthrowing humanity as the dominant species on Earth.

==== Yuka Osada ====
Yuka Osada (長田 結花, Osada Yuka) is a teenage girl who was bullied by her younger sister, who their parents favored over her, and other girls from her school and basketball team. The emotional stress from this leads to her falling down snow-covered stairs, reviving as the Crane Orphnoch (クレインオルフェノク, Kurein Orufenoku), and slaughtering her sister and the basketball team. Following this, she meets Yuji Kiba and joins him in protecting humans, though she occasionally and secretly kills people she deems "bad guys". Throughout the series, she exchanges texts with Keitaro Kikuchi, eventually developing a semi-romantic relationship with him along the way, and developed a crush on Naoya Kaido, though he does not reciprocate. Near the end of the series, she is mortally wounded by the Bat Orphnoch and killed by Saeko Kageyama.

In an alternate timeline depicted in the film Kamen Rider 555: Paradise Lost, Osada joins Yuji and Kaido in proving to the Human Liberation Army that they were on their side. However, the trio fall into a Smart Brain trap, during which Osada and Kaido are killed by the Elasmotherium Orphnoch.

As the Crane Orphnoch, Osada can fly at incredible speeds, create afterimages, and possesses increased lung capacity and superhuman hearing and jumping. Additionally, her film counterpart can assume an alternate Flying Mode (飛翔態, Hishō-tai), gaining larger bird wings on her collar and sides as well as crane-like legs.

Yuka Osada is portrayed by Yoshika Katō (加藤 美佳, Katō Yoshika).

==== Naoya Kaido ====
Naoya Kaido (海堂 直也, Kaidō Naoya) is an overly eccentric young man prone to incredibly fast speeches and constant mood swings who Eiichi Toda, the temporary chief of Smart Brain, sired as the Snake Orphnoch (スネークオルフェノク, Sunēku Orufenoku) to show Yuji Kiba and Yuka Osada how Orphnochs must make allies. In his younger years, Kaido played the guitar, but was sabotaged by his teacher, who destroyed his motor skills in his left hand, forcing him to abandon music. After struggling with his nature as an Orphnoch, Kaido lives with Yuji and Osada despite not sharing their desire to protect humans. Throughout the series, Kaido sides with Smart Brain, becoming Kamen Rider Faiz on one occasion and commander of their Riotroopers on a separate occasion, but his conscience ultimately stops him from committing heinous acts at the last second. Following Osada and Yuji's deaths, Kaido reintegrates into human society.

In an alternate timeline depicted in the film Kamen Rider 555: Paradise Lost, Kaido joins Yuji and Osada in proving to the Human Liberation Army that they were on their side, only to fall into a Smart Brain trap and come under attack by the Elasmotherium Orphnoch. Despite being mortally wounded, Kaido confesses his feelings to Osada before mounting a failed attack on the Elasmotherium Orphnoch, which eats him.

As of the web series Kamen Rider Revice: The Mystery, Kaido took on the alias of Naoto Kamiya (上屋 直人, Kamiya Naoto) and became a guitar instructor.

During the events of the V-Cinema Kamen Rider 555 20th: Paradise Regained, Kaido runs a ramen restaurant and looks after young Orphnochs, such as Hisao, Kouta, and Kei.

As the Snake Orphnoch, Kaido can spit acidic venom.

Naoya Kaido is portrayed by Mitsuru Karahashi (唐橋 充, Karahashi Mitsuru).

==== Teruo Suzuki ====
Teruo Suzuki (鈴木 照男, Suzuki Teruo) is an antisocial young boy whose parents were killed by the Barnacle Orphnoch and was subsequently placed in Smart Brain's orphanage Sousai Children's Home (創才児童園, Sōsai Jidōen) until Naoya Kaido found him and brought him to stay at the Kikuchi laundromat. Near the end of the series, the grasshopper-like Arch Orphnoch (アークオルフェノク, Āku Orufenoku), also known as the Orphnoch King, begins to awaken inside Teruo as it uses the boy's shadow to consume other Orphnochs and mature. Upon awakening and possessing Teruo's body, the Arch Orphnoch battles Takumi Inui and Yuji Kiba until the latter sacrifices himself to help the former defeat the Arch Orphnoch, who Saeko Kageyama secretly places in a stasis tank and goes into hiding with.

The Arch Orphnoch resurfaces during the events of the web series Kamen Rider Outsiders, having taken control of Smart Brain and found a new aide in the Smart Queen. While attempting to acquire the Genm Musou Corporation's technology to counter the threat of Zein, the Arch Orphnoch confronts its CEO Kamen Rider Genm before Gai Amatsu intervenes in an attempt to suggest an alliance to fight Zein instead. However, Genm and the Arch Orphnoch refuse and take their leave, with the latter declaring that he would never work with humans.

The Arch Orphnoch possesses the ability to "complete" regular Orphnochs' evolution by removing their humanity, pyrokinesis, the most physical strength out of any Orphnoch, and the use of tentacles and finger lasers capable of destroying regular Orphnochs.

Teruo Suzuki is portrayed by Kayato Watanabe (渡辺 彼野人, Watanabe Kayato) while Shun Kobayashi (小林 俊, Kobayashi Shun) portrays his shadow and the Arch Orphnoch is voiced by Hiroshi Yanaka (家中 宏, Yanaka Hiroshi).

==== Minor Orphnochs ====
- Owl Orphnoch (オウルオルフェノク, Ouru Orufenoku): An Orphnoch who possesses superhuman jumping and sight, claws, and the ability to produce black poisonous gas who can assume the form of an unnamed professor. While working at Yamanote Music University, he attacks his best students, such as Naoya Kaido, believing humans are unfit to have such talent and should live harsh lives instead, until he is killed by Yuji Kiba as the Horse Orphnoch. During the events of the film Kamen Rider 555: Paradise Lost, a Smart Brain employee transforms into a second Owl Orphnoch. The Owl Orphnoch is portrayed by Ichiro Ogura (小倉 一郎, Ogura Ichirō) in the series.
- Snail Orphnoch (スネイルオルフェノク, Suneiru Orufenoku): An Orphnoch who possesses eye stalks that grant omnidirectional vision, the ability to produce mucus that allows him crawl up walls, a left arm that doubles as a hammer, and can assume the identity of an unnamed masked man. He initially chooses not to kill people, instead stealing food to survive. After Smart Brain hires Naoya Kaido to use the Faiz Gear and serve as their enforcer, the Snail Orphnoch is scared into killing people, quickly developing bloodlust in the process until Takumi Inui gets the Faiz Gear back and uses it to kill the Orphnoch. The Snail Orphnoch is portrayed by Koji Suzuki (鈴木 浩二, Suzuki Kōji).
- Equisetum Orphnoch (エキセタムオルフェノク, Ekisetamu Orufenoku): An Orphnoch who possesses superhuman speed and the ability to produce toxic spores. They are killed by Masato Kusaka as Kamen Rider Kaixa.
- Flying Fish Orphnoch (フライングフィッシュオルフェノク, Furaingufisshu Orufenoku): An Orphnoch who possesses increased swimming capabilities and marksmanship, wrist-mounted fins that can double as melee weapons, the use of a harpoon gun, and can assume the form of an unnamed bicycle riding man, but lacks combat training. He is killed by Takumi Inui as Kamen Rider Faiz. The Flying Fish Orphnoch is portrayed by Ryo Taguchi (田口 亮, Taguchi Ryō).
- Yoshimasa Morishita (森下 義正, Morishita Yoshimasa): The older brother of Yuji Kiba's ex-girlfriend, Chie Morishita. While searching for his sister's murderer, Yoshimasa was attacked by the Flying Fish Orphnoch, who sired him as the Armadillo Orphnoch (アルマジロオルフェノク, Arumajiro Orufenoku), gaining superhuman strength, hard skin, and the use of a sword and shield. Due to a combination of his transformation and hearing others talk negatively of Chie, Yoshimasa goes on an insanity-induced rampage until he is killed by Takumi Inui as Kamen Rider Faiz. Yoshimasa Morishita is portrayed by Toshinobu Matsuo (松尾 敏伸, Matsuo Toshinobu).
- Toadstool Orphnoch (トードスツールオルフェノク, Tōdosutsūru Orufenoku): An Orphnoch who wields a battering ram staff and can emit poisonous spores and as well as assume the form of an unnamed clown. He pursues a young girl named Keiko Kurata until he is killed by Takumi Inui as Kamen Rider Faiz. The Toadstool Orphnoch is voiced by Katsumi Shiono (塩野 勝美, Shiono Katsumi) while Shinya Tatsukawa (立川 真也, Tatsukawa Shin'ya) portrays his human form.
- Shigehisa Aoki (青木 茂久, Aoki Shigehisa): The owner of a pizza parlor and Takumi Inui and Yuji Kiba's boss who can transform into the Dolphin Orphnoch (ドルフィンオルフェノク, Dorufin Orufenoku), gaining increased swimming capabilities, ultrasonic wave detection, and a fin-like sword. Smart Brain forces Shigehisa to kill people until he is defeated by Takumi as Kamen Rider Faiz, who spares him and tells him to resume his human life. Shigehisa Aoki is portrayed by Sarutoki Minagawa (皆川 猿時, Minagawa Sarutoki).
- Frog Orphnoch (フロッグオルフェノク, Furoggu Orufenoku): An Orphnoch who possesses superhuman strength and an acid shooting gun. After surviving an attack by Aki Sawada, the Frog Orphnoch is killed by Saya Kimura as Kamen Rider Delta. The Frog Orphnoch is portrayed by Masashi Morishima (森島 將士, Morishima Masashi).
- Stinkbug Orphnoch (スティンクバグオルフェノク, Sutinkubagu Orufenoku): An Orphnoch who possesses increased stealth capabilities and gas grenades capable of causing vomiting and skin and eye irritation. After being defeated by Takumi Inui and Masato Kusaka as Kamen Riders Faiz and Kaixa respectively, he attempts to kill Mari Sonoda and Keitaro Kikuchi, only to be killed by Yuji Kiba as the Horse Orphnoch. The Stinkbug Orphnoch is voiced by Katsumi Shiono.
- Swordfish Orphnoch (ソードフィッシュオルフェノク, Sōdofisshu Orufenoku): An Orphnoch who wields a pair of swords capable of slicing through iron and producing high-frequency vibrations and can assume the form of an unnamed gorgeous man. He is killed by Takumi Inui as Kamen Rider Faiz. The Swordfish Orphnoch is portrayed by Masaki Tachi (舘 正貴, Tachi Masaki).
- Octopus Orphnoch (オクトパスオルフェノク, Okutopasu Orufenoku): An Orphnoch who can stretch his arms across short distances, produce ink clouds from his nose, and assume the form of a young, unnamed boxer. He is killed by Takumi Inui as Kamen Rider Faiz. The Octopus Orphnoch is portrayed by Yusuke Takahata (高畑 雄亮, Takahata Yūsuke).
- Barnacle Orphnoch (バーナクルオルフェノク, Bānakuru Orufenoku): An arsonist and former employee of Smart Brain who possesses superhuman strength and durability as well as the ability to produce explosive barnacle clusters. After starting fires that would go on to kill Mari Sonoda and Teruo Suzuki's respective parents, the Barnacle Orphnoch was fired and marked for death by Kyoji Murakami for his incompetence and attracting law enforcement. Unaware of Kitazaki's pursuit of him, the Barnacle Orphnoch attempts to steal the Rider Gears, only to be killed by Takumi Inui as Kamen Rider Faiz. The Barnacle Orphnoch is portrayed by Masashi Shirai (白井 雅士, Shirai Masashi).
- Aonuma (青沼): A Ryusei School student who was transformed into the Sloth Orphnoch (スロースオルフェノク, Surōsu Orufenoku), gaining night vision and three sharp claws on each wrist capable of slicing through iron plates, during Kitazaki's attack on the Ryusei School reunion and joined him in slaughtering his classmates until Aonuma was killed by Takumi Inui as the Wolf Orphnoch. Aonuma is portrayed by Kazuma Kurihara (栗原 一馬, Kurihara Kazuma).
- Crab Orphnoch (クラブオルフェノク, Kurabu Orufenoku): An Orphnoch with a pincer for a left hand and an enhanced sense of hearing. He was captured and used by human scientists led by Masahiko Minami as a guinea pig until he heard the similarly captive Yuka Osada's screams and breaks out of his confinement to rescue her. After transferring her to Yuji Kiba's custody, the Crab Orphnoch attempts to flee, but ultimately dies from the Orphnochs' genetic flaw. The Crab Orphnoch is voiced by Satoshi Matsuda (松田 悟志, Matsuda Satoshi).

===== Other Orphnochs =====
- Giraffe Orphnoch (ジラフオルフェノク, Jirafu Orufenoku): An unnamed woman who is killed by Masato Kusaka as Kamen Rider Kaixa and appears exclusively in the film Kamen Rider 555: Paradise Lost.
- Longhorn Orphnoch (ロングホーンオルフェノク, Ronguhōn Orufenoku): An unnamed man who is killed by Masato Kusaka as Kamen Rider Kaixa and appears exclusively in the film Kamen Rider 555: Paradise Lost.
- Hisao (ヒサオ): A man who can transform into the Mosquito Orphnoch (モスキートオルフェノク, Mosukīto Orufenoku), uses the Delta Gear to become Kamen Rider Delta, and appears exclusively in the V-Cinema Kamen Rider 555 20th: Paradise Regained. He is killed by Rena Kurumi as Kamen Rider Muez. Hisao is portrayed by Rui Yanagawa (柳川 るい, Yanagawa Rui).
- Kouta (コウタ, Kōta): A man who can transform into the Gecko Orphnoch (ゲッコーオルフェノク, Gekkō Orufenoku) and appears exclusively in the V-Cinema Kamen Rider 555 20th: Paradise Regained. He is killed by the android Kitazaki. Kota is portrayed by Ryunosuke Hashino (土師野 隆之介, Hashino Ryūnosuke).
- Kei (ケイ): A girl who can transform into the Kuina Orphnoch (クイナオルフェノク, Kuina Orufenoku) and appears exclusively in the V-Cinema Kamen Rider 555 20th: Paradise Regained. Kei is portrayed by Kanon Matsuzawa (松澤 可苑, Matsuzawa Kanon).

=== Smart Brain ===
Smart Brain, Inc. (スマートブレイン社, Sumāto Burein-sha) is a company that serves as a front for a group of Orphnochs who view themselves as a master race and are dedicated to overthrowing humanity by either annihilating them or converting them into Orphnochs as well as eliminate Orphnoch who do not agree with their ideals.

In an alternate timeline depicted in the film Kamen Rider 555: Paradise Lost, Smart Brain has become the world's ruling government following the Orphnochs' takeover of Earth.

As of the V-Cinema Kamen Rider 555 20th: Paradise Regained, the government has restructured Smart Brain with the aim of eliminating Orphnochs.

==== Kyoji Murakami ====
Kyoji Murakami (村上 峡児, Murakami Kyōji), also known as the Rose Orphnoch (ローズオルフェノク, Rōzu Orufenoku), is the underhanded chief of Smart Brain and successor to temporary chief Eiichi Toda following Toda's defeat at Kamen Rider Faiz's hands. Murakami is later overthrown by Hanagata and replaced with Yuji Kiba. Despite this, he seeks out the Arch Orphnoch in the hopes of correcting the Orphnochs' genetic instability, giving his life to awaken him.

In an alternate timeline depicted in the film Kamen Rider 555: Paradise Lost, Murakami was reduced to a head in a jar, but retains a significant command position in Smart Brain until the Elasmotherium Orphnoch fails to kill Takumi Inui and Murakami is murdered by Smart Lady on his superiors' orders.

As the Rose Orphnoch, Murakami possesses levitation capabilities, pyrokinesis, increased durability compared to most Orphnochs, and the ability to generate rose petals to damage or distract opponents.

Kyoji Murakami is portrayed by Katsuyuki Murai (村井 克行, Murai Katsuyuki).

==== Smart Lady ====
The Smart Lady (スマートレディ, Sumāto Redi) is a moniker used by the "mascot" of Smart Brain who works closely with the company's chief and helps fledgling Orphnochs. The first iteration acts friendly and playful towards the many workers at Smart Brain, though she does not realize that no one enjoys her company.

The first iteration of Smart Lady is portrayed by Hitomi Kurihara (栗原 瞳, Kurihara Hitomi) in the series and the film Kamen Rider 555: Paradise Lost while the second iteration is portrayed by Amane Shindō (進藤 あまね, Shindō Amane) in the V-Cinema Kamen Rider 555 20th: Paradise Regained.

==== Riotroopers ====
Riotroopers (ライオトルーパー, Raiotorūpā) are Smart Brain's personal army of foot soldiers who all utilize mass-produced Smart Buckle (スマートバックル, Sumāto Bukkaru) belts.

==== Lucky Clover ====
The Lucky Clover (ラッキークローバー, Rakkī Kurōbā) are an elite quartet of Orphnochs who answer directly to Smart Brain's Chief.

===== Itsuro Takuma =====
Itsuro Takuma (琢磨 逸郎, Takuma Itsurō) is a cold, prideful, and initially quiet yet physically weak, cowardly, and clumsy member of the Lucky Clover who can transform into the Centipede Orphnoch (センチピードオルフェノク, Senchipīdo Orufenoku), enjoys reading poetry, and puts on a calm yet tough front despite being afraid of Kitazaki. Additionally, Takuma continuously seeks to impress Saeko Kageyama, despite fouling up their objectives whenever he does so, and secretly longs to resume his human life. Due to suffering multiple defeats across the series, Kitazaki bullies Takuma, who takes any opportunity to pay him back in kind whenever Kitazaki is weakened or hurt. After witnessing the Arch Orphnoch kill Kitazaki and remove Saeko Kageyama's humanity, Takuma flees and goes into hiding in human society, taking a job as a construction worker.

As the Centipede Orphnoch, Takuma possesses superhuman strength and speed, a body covered in toxic extendable spikes, the ability to fire blue energy rays, 180 degree vision, and the use of a spiky centipede-like whip.

Itsuro Takuma is portrayed by Jun Yamasaki (山崎 潤, Yamasaki Jun).

===== Saeko Kageyama =====
Saeko Kageyama (影山 冴子, Kageyama Saeko) is a calm yet sadistic and misanthropic member of the Lucky Clover who can transform into the Lobster Orphnoch (ロブスターオルフェノク, Robusutā Orufenoku), serves as the proprietor of the Lucky Clover's hideout, the Clover Bar, despises humans and Orphnochs who do not kill them, and provides emotional support to her fellow Orphnoch. Enjoying seeing her victims suffer and comforting them in disturbing ways, she has a habit of sending them a bottle of rare wine as their final drink. Upon learning of the Orphnochs' genetic flaw, she successfully seeks out the Arch Orphnoch to become immortal. Following the Arch Orphnoch's defeat, she goes into hiding with it and attends to its injuries.

As the Lobster Orphnoch, Kageyama possesses flexible armor, the ability to fire blue energy balls from her hands, a pair of gauntlets capable of withstanding most forms of attack, and the use of a rapier.

Saeko Kageyama is portrayed by Waka (和香).

===== J =====
J (ジェイ, Jei) is a foreign Orphnoch fluent in Japanese who usually travels with his pet chihuahua, Chaco, can transform into the Crocodile Orphnoch (クロコダイルオルフェノク, Kurokodairu Orufenoku), and possesses three lives. He is sent to kill Kamen Rider Faiz, but loses his first two lives to Kiyotaka Nishida and Masato Kusaka as Kamen Rider Kaixa. J is reluctant to continue until Kyoji Murakami threatens to brand him a traitor and punish Chaco unless he does so. J is eventually killed by Takumi Inui as Kamen Rider Faiz while Chaco comes into the care of a little girl named Keiko Kurata.

As the Crocodile Orphnoch, J possesses sharp claws and superhuman strength and durability along with his aforementioned three lives, which allow him to revive from attacks that would be fatal to regular Orphnochs. As he revives, he transitions from his initial Fight Mode (格闘態, Kakutō-tai) to Strength Mode (剛強態, Gōkyō-tai), which is 1.5 times stronger than his Fight Mode and grants the use of the "Fakris Horn" claw, and Violence Mode (凶暴態, Kyōbō-tai), which is three times stronger than his Fight Mode and grants the use of a sword and the ability to enhance his claws with blue flames.

J is portrayed by Kenneth Duria (ケネス・ヅリア, Kenesu Zuria).

===== Aki Sawada =====
Aki Sawada (澤田 亜希, Sawada Aki) is a formerly kind-hearted student of the Ryusei School who was killed by Kitazaki during his attack on the school's reunion, which led to Sawada becoming the Spider Orphnoch (スパイダーオルフェノク, Supaidā Orufenoku) as part of a Smart Brain experiment. Turning his back on his former life, he kills fellow classmate Saya Kimura to steal the Delta Gear and join Lucky Clover. Not long after joining, he develops a habit of folding animal-themed origami and lighting them on fire before initiating a massacre while listening to rap music, with the flame usually dying out once he kills the last person present. After returning the Delta Gear to the Ryusei School however, Kyoji Murakami brands Sawada a traitor. Realizing he still has some humanity left in him, he battles the other Lucky Clover members, sustaining mortal wounds against them, until he is fatally wounded by Masato Kusaka as Kamen Rider Kaixa. Before he dies, Sawada tells Takumi Inui to continue fighting as Kamen Rider Faiz to save humanity.

As the Spider Orphnoch, Sawada possesses superhuman strength, agility, accuracy, and jumping, the ability to cling to walls and ceilings, elastic limbs, spider silk-like hair capable of stretching and piercing concrete, fire spider silk from his mouth, a giant eye on his chest that is sensitive to movement, and the use of the "Hapo Shuriken", a wheel with eight spikes and a blade that can inject poison into targets that he can use as a melee and ranged weapon.

Aki Sawada is portrayed by Go Ayano (綾野 剛, Ayano Gō).

===== Kitazaki =====
Kitazaki (北崎) (Note: The V-Cinema Kamen Rider 555 20th: Paradise Regained reveals that Kitazaki's first name is Nozomu (望).) is an arrogant and violent member of the Lucky Clover, as well as the strongest and youngest member of the group, who can transform into the Dragon Orphnoch (ドラゴンオルフェノク, Doragon Orufenoku), suffers from mental incapacitation, enjoys bullying Itsuro Takuma, and attacked the Ryusei School reunion sometime prior to the series. Due to his powers, he became withdrawn from society, developing a childish outlook on others' suffering, which he sees as fun. Throughout the series, Kitazaki briefly uses the Delta Gear to become Kamen Rider Delta before becoming bored of it and successfully defeats the other Riders several times until he is defeated by Takumi Inui as Kamen Rider Faiz, which drives Kitazaki insane. Seeking revenge, Kitazaki would go on to battle Takumi several times, clashing with his fellow Lucky Clover members in the process. During the series finale, Kitazaki attempts to kill the Arch Orphnoch to prove his superiority, only to be killed by the Orphnoch King.

During the events of the V-Cinema Kamen Rider 555 20th: Paradise Regained, an android modeled after Kitazaki serves as the chief of Smart Brain and uses the Muez Gear to become Kamen Rider Muez after Rena Kurumi's death. He is destroyed by Takumi Inui as Kamen Rider Faiz due to Kamen Rider Muez's Predictive AI function lacking data on the original Faiz equipment.

In his human form, Kitazaki can turn anything he touches to ash, exhale red gas capable of disintegrating anything it comes into contact with, and fire destructive red energy blasts. As the Dragon Orphnoch, he can alternate between Demon-Human Mode (魔人態, Majin-tai), which grants bulky armor, superhuman strength and durability, and a pair of claws on each hand, and Dragon-Human Mode (龍人態, Ryūjin-tai), which grants superhuman speed and agility that rivals that of Kamen Rider Faiz Axel Form.

Kitazaki is portrayed by Ray Fujita (藤田 玲, Fujita Rei).

==== Minor members ====
- Hiroshi Izawa (井沢 博司, Izawa Hiroshi): A traveler who can transform into the Stingfish Orphnoch (スティングフィッシュオルフェノク, Sutingufisshu Orufenoku), gaining the ability to transform further into a merman-esque Swimming Mode (遊泳態, Yūei-tai). He is sent to retrieve the Faiz Gear, only to be killed by Takumi Inui as Kamen Rider Faiz. The Stingfish Orphnoch is portrayed by Masanobu Kinoshita (木下 政信, Kinoshita Masanobu).
- Elephant Orphnoch (エレファントオルフェノク, Erefanto Orufenoku): An Orphnoch who wields a cannon, can transform from his regular humanoid Fight Mode (格闘態, Kakutō-tai) to his giant centaur-like Charge Mode (突進態, Tosshin-tai), and assume the identity of an unnamed biker. He attempts to steal the Faiz Gear, attacking Mari Sonoda in the process, until he is killed by Takumi Inui as Kamen Rider Faiz. During the events of the film Kamen Rider 555: Paradise Lost, a Smart Brain employee transforms into a second Elephant Orphnoch. The Elephant Orphnoch is portrayed by Tatsumi Nagasawa (永沢 巽, Nagasawa Tatsumi) in the series.
- Aoki (青木): A bounty hunter and associate of Midorikawa and Akai's who can transform into the Ox Orphnoch (オックスオルフェノク, Okkusu Orufenoku), gaining giant horns on the sides of his head, superhuman strength, and giant wrecking ball-like fists. He is tasked with retrieving the Faiz Gear, only to be killed by Takumi Inui as Kamen Rider Faiz. Aoki is portrayed by Hitohiro Tanaka (田中 仁浩, Tanaka Hitohiro).
- Midorikawa (緑川): A bounty hunter, associate of Aoki's, and senior partner to Akai who can transform into the Mantis Orphnoch (マンティスオルフェノク, Mantisu Orufenoku), gaining increased superhuman eyesight and jumping as well as sickle-like blades that he wields in a reverse grip. While attempting to retrieve the Faiz Gear, he is betrayed and killed by Akai as Kamen Rider Faiz. Midorikawa is portrayed by Mikio Sato (佐藤 幹雄, Satō Mikio).
- Akai (赤井): A bounty hunter, associate of Aoki's, and junior partner to Midorikawa who can transform into the Cactus Orphnoch (カクタスオルフェノク, Kakutasu Orufenoku), gaining a spine-covered body and the ability to shoot off said spines. While working with Midorikawa to retrieve the Faiz Gear, Akai uses it to betray and kill him until Keitaro Kikuchi retrieves the Fair Gear for Takumi Inui, who uses it to kill Akai in turn. Akai is portrayed by Katsuyuki Yamazaki (山﨑 勝之, Yamazaki Katsuyuki).
- Eiichi Toda (戸田 英一, Toda Eiichi): The temporary head of Smart Brain who can transform into the Squid Orphnoch (スクィッドオルフェノク, Sukuiddo Orufenoku), gaining teleportation capabilities and the use of an umbrella-like staff capable of producing ink that can destroy humans' hearts. He came to Japan to locate the Faiz Gear, but is reassigned to help Yuji Kiba and Yuka Osada better understand their new Orphnoch forms. When the pair refuse to sire more Orphnochs, Toda attempts to set an example for them by going on a rampage, siring Naoya Kaido as the Snake Orphnoch in the process, only to be killed by Takumi Inui as Kamen Rider Faiz. Eiichi Toda is portrayed by Shigeki Kagemaru (影丸 茂樹, Kagemaru Shigeki).
- Scarab Orphnoch (スカラベオルフェノク, Sukarabe Orufenoku): An Orphnoch with armor-like skin, superhuman strength, a rapier, a back-mounted shield, and antlers capable of picking up radio and sound waves who can assume the identity of an unnamed, bespectacled man. He is assigned to retrieve the Faiz Gear by tailing Takumi Inui, who uses the Faiz Gear to kill him. The Scarab Orphnoch is portrayed by Masazumi Yagi (八木 正純, Yagi Masazumi).
- Oonogi (大野木, Ōnogi): A potential candidate for J's replacement in the Lucky Clover who can transform into the Scorpion Orphnoch (スコーピオンオルフェノク, Sukōpion Orufenoku), gaining superhuman strength and the use of a flail, only to be killed by Takumi Inui as Kamen Rider Faiz. Oonogi is portrayed by Teppei Sakata (坂田 鉄平, Sakata Teppei).
- Koichi (浩一, Kōichi): A potential candidate for J's replacement in the Lucky Clover who can transform into the Worm Orphnoch (ワームオルフェノク, Wāmu Orufenoku), gaining the use of a giant crescent-shaped blade, only to be killed by Masato Kusaka as Kamen Rider Kaixa. Koichi is portrayed by Kei Tamura (田村 圭生, Tamura Kei).
- Sea Cucumber Orphnoch (シーキュカンバーオルフェノク, Shīkyukanbā Orufenoku): A potential candidate for J's replacement in the Lucky Clover who can produce acidic mucus from his hands capable of melting concrete and assume the form of an unnamed salaryman. He is killed by Takumi Inui as Kamen Rider Faiz. The Sea Cucumber Orphnoch is portrayed by Tatsuro Kawano (河野 達郎, Kawano Tatsurō).
- Yoshio Kobayashi (小林 義雄, Kobayashi Yoshio): A young man who recently became the Rabbit Orphnoch (ラビットオルフェノク, Rabitto Orufenoku) and attempted to commit suicide before being saved by and falling under Naoya Kaido's wing. In the hopes of joining the Lucky Clover, the pair steal the Faiz and Kaixa Gears, but are told by Kyoji Murakami that only one of them can join and the position will go to whoever kills Yuji Kiba. Taking Kaido's words to heart, Kobayashi kidnaps Yuka Osada, which angers Kaido. Kobayashi escapes from Yuji, Osada, and Kaido, only to be killed by Masato Kusaka as Kamen Rider Kaixa. Yoshio Kobayashi is portrayed by Masato Uchiyama (内山 眞人, Uchiyama Masato).
- Rhinoceros Beetle Orphnoch (ライノセラスビートルオルフェノク, Rainoserasu Bītoru Orufenoku): An Orphnoch serving under Kyoji Murakami who possesses samurai-like chain mail armor and wields a halberd. He is killed by Masato Kusaka as Kamen Rider Delta. During the events of the V-Cinema Kamen Rider 555 20th: Paradise Regained, an unnamed man unrelated to Smart Brain becomes a second Rhinoceros Beetle Orphnoch, only to be killed by Rena Kurumi as Kamen Rider Muez. The Rhinoceros Beetle Orphnoch is portrayed by Kota Otsuka (大塚 幸汰, Ōtsuka Kōta) in the series and Isao Kumakura (熊倉 功, Kumakura Isao) in the V-Cinema.
- Stag Beetle Orphnoch (スタッグビートルオルフェノク, Sutaggu Bītoru Orufenoku): An Orphnoch serving under Kyoji Murakami who possesses samurai-like armor and a forked staff. He is killed by Shuji Mihara as Kamen Rider Delta. The Stag Beetle Orphnoch is portrayed by Seiki Chiba (千葉 誠樹, Chiba Seiki).
- Pigeon Orphnoch (ピジョンオルフェノク, Pijon Orufenoku): An Orphnoch serving under Itsuro Takuma who possesses sharp claws, shurikens made from his feathers, and flying capabilities. He is killed by Yuji Kiba as Kamen Rider Faiz. The Pigeon Orphnoch is portrayed by Akinori Aoto (青戸 昭憲, Aoto Akinori).
- Okra Orphnoch (オクラオルフェノク, Okura Orufenoku) An associate of Kitazaki's who wields an axe, a net, and a helmet that grants increased headbutting capabilities. He assists Kitazaki in attacking Takumi Inui as Kamen Rider Faiz, who eventually kills the Okra Orphnoch. The Okra Orphnoch is voiced by Katsumi Shiono.
- Frilled Lizard Orphnoch (フリルドリザードオルフェノク, Furirudo Rizādo Orufenoku): An associate of Saeko Kageyama's who wields a rapier and shield. He joins her in testing Yuka Osada's abilities until he is killed by Takumi Inui as Kamen Rider Faiz. This Okra Orphnoch is voiced by Katsumi Shiono.
- Bat Orphnoch (バットオルフェノク, Batto Orufenoku): An Orphnoch who wields two pistols and shoulder-mounted blades that can double as boomerangs and can assume the form of an unnamed man wearing sunglasses. While aiding Masahiko Minami on Kyoji Murakami's orders, the Bat Orphnoch mortally wounds Yuka Osada and fights Naoya Kaido and Shuji Mihara as Kamen Rider Delta before Takumi Inui as Kamen Rider Faiz kills the Bat Orphnoch. The Bat Orphnoch is portrayed by Taishin Otsuka (大塚 太心, Ōtsuka Taishin).
- Coral Orphnoch (コーラルオルフェノク, Kōraru Orufenoku): An Orphnoch who possesses the ability to fire a gel solution capable of immobilizing targets from his three tube-like mouths, increased durability, a rod-covered body capable of diffusing melee attacks, and wields a double-headed spear and can assume the form of an unnamed leather jacketed man. After being targeted by Teruo Suzuki, the Coral Orphnoch reveals the child's existence to Kyoji Murakami before attempting to kill Teruo before he can become the Orphnoch King, only to be killed by Takumi Inui and Shuji Mihara as Kamen Riders Faiz and Delta respectively. The Coral Orphnoch is portrayed by Kairi Narita (成田 浬, Narita Kairi).

===== Other members =====
- Butterfly Orphnoch (バタフライオルフェノク, Batafurai Orufenoku): A female Smart Brain employee who is killed by Masato Kusaka as Kamen Rider Kaixa and appears exclusively in the film Kamen Rider 555: Paradise Lost. The Butterfly Orphnoch is portrayed by Miho Shiroyama (城山 未帆, Shiroyama Miho).
- Wild Boar Orphnoch (ワイルドボアオルフェノク, Wairudo Boa Orufenoku): A male Smart Brain employee who is killed by Kamen Rider Psyga and appears exclusively in the film Kamen Rider 555: Paradise Lost.
- Pelican Orphnoch (ペリカンオルフェノク, Perikan Orufenoku): A male Smart Brain employee who is killed by Kamen Rider Psyga and appears exclusively in the film Kamen Rider 555: Paradise Lost.
- Slug Orphnoch (スラッグオルフェノク, Suraggu Orufenoku): A male Smart Brain employee who is killed by Kamen Rider Psyga and appears exclusively in the film Kamen Rider 555: Paradise Lost.
- Lion Orphnoch (ライオンオルフェノク, Raion Orufenoku): A Riotrooper commander who appears exclusively in the film Kamen Rider 555: Paradise Lost. He is tasked with eliminating the Human Liberation Army, only to be killed by Keitaro Kikuchi as Kamen Rider Kaixa. The Lion Orphnoch is voiced by Tsuyoshi Koyama (小山 剛志, Koyama Tsuyoshi).
- Mole Orphnoch (モールオルフェノク, Mōru Orufenoku): A Riotrooper member who appears exclusively in the film Kamen Rider 555: Paradise Lost.
- Moose Orphnoch (ムースオルフェノク, Mūsu Orufenoku): A Riotrooper member who appears exclusively in the film Kamen Rider 555: Paradise Lost.
- Elasmotherium Orphnoch (エラスモテリウムオルフェノク, Erasumoteriumu Orufenoku): A giant Orphnoch under Murakami's command that is perpetually in its beast-like Raging Mode and appears exclusively in the film Kamen Rider 555: Paradise Lost. After attacking Yuji Kiba's group as part of a Smart Brain trap, Murakami sends the Elasmotherium Orphnoch to kill Takumi Inui as Kamen Rider Faiz, who eventually kills it after Yuji sacrifices himself to wound it.
- Kamen Rider Alpha (仮面ライダーアルファ, Kamen Raidā Arufa): An unnamed member of Smart Brain's Special Forces who appears exclusively in the stage show Kamen Rider Battle Stage: Faiz vs. Delta.
- Kamen Rider Beta (仮面ライダーベータ, Kamen Raidā Bēta): An unnamed member of Smart Brain's Special Forces who appears exclusively in the stage show Kamen Rider Battle Stage: Faiz vs. Delta.
- Kamen Rider Gamma (仮面ライダーガンマ, Kamen Raidā Ganma): An unnamed member of Smart Brain's Special Forces who appears exclusively in the stage show Kamen Rider Battle Stage: Faiz vs. Delta.

=== Keitaro Kikuchi ===
Keitaro Kikuchi (菊池 啓太郎, Kikuchi Keitarō) is a young man who dreams of making everyone in the world happy and possesses an Orphnoch allergy, though he believes he is allergic to people with bad hearts. After meeting Mari Sonoda and Takumi Inui by chance after they acquired the Faiz Gear, he allows them to stay with him at his family's dry cleaning business, West Washing Shop Kikuchi (西洋洗濯舗 菊池, Seiyō Sentakuho Kikuchi), in exchange for room and board in the hopes of encouraging them to use the Faiz Gear for good. Throughout the series, he exchanges texts with his pen pal, "Yuka", and becomes infatuated with Yuka Osada despite being unaware that they are the same person until later in the series.

Keitaro Kikuchi is portrayed by Ken Mizorogi (溝呂木 賢, Mizorogi Ken).

=== Ryusei School ===
The Ryusei School (流星塾, Ryūseijuku) is a group of orphans fostered by Smart Brain's former chief, Hanagata, and schooled under their teacher, Mr. Masuda (増田教諭, Masuda-kyōyu). Prior to the series' beginning, they attended a reunion, where all of the alumni present were either killed or sired as Orphnoch, with only Masato Kusaka retaining his memories of the attack since he was not there. Hanagata sent the survivors three Rider Gears (ライダーギア, Raidā Gia) to combat the Orphnochs, but they are unable to use two of them due to compatibility issues and fatal side effects while the third causes megalomania.

==== Hanagata ====
Hanagata (花形) is the founder and former chief of Smart Brain who can transform into the Goat Orphnoch (ゴートオルフェノク, Gōto Orufenoku) and sought to evolve mankind for the better. To this end, he secretly took in orphans and had them experimented on to determine their potential for evolving into Orphnochs and locate the Arch Orphnoch. Furthermore, he developed the Rider Gears, most of which can only be used by Orphnochs or humans implanted with a sufficient amount of Orphnoch DNA, to protect the Arch Orphnoch once they were found. However, he discovered he was dying due to his Orphnoch nature, realized the error of his ways, and disappeared, taking the Rider Gears with him in the hopes of stopping humanity from becoming monsters. He would go on to become the Ryusei School's foster father and secretly give them the Rider Gears, believing they would be able to stop the other Orphnochs, and watched over them from the shadows for years.

In the present, Hanagata resurfaces to aid Takumi Inui and Masato Kusaka by giving them new equipment before stripping Smart Brain's current chief, Kyoji Murakami, of his duties and appointing Yuji Kiba as the permanent head of the company in response to the Arch Orphnoch's eventual awakening. While attempting to see his students, Mari Sonoda and Rina Abe, one more time, he is stopped by Masato, who learned of Hanagata's true nature as an Orphnoch. Hanagata stops him from transforming, but ultimately dies telling Masato to keep living due to miscalculating his time of death.

As the Goat Orphnoch, Hanagata possesses superhuman strength, speed, and agility as well as sharp horns. Additionally, he is trained in kenpō.

Hanagata is portrayed by Koji Naka (中 康治, Naka Kōji).

==== Rina Abe ====
Rina Abe (阿部 里奈, Abe Rina) is a former alumnus of the Ryusei School who worked at Sousai Children's Home. She and her fellow alumni initially attempt to find a suitable user for the Kaixa Gear before most of them fall victim to the Delta Gear's addictive side effect. Rina temporarily takes up the mantle of Kamen Rider Delta and overcomes the side effect, but her lack of combat prowess forces her to give it to her friend Shuji Mihara, who initially refuses. After being hospitalized while retrieving the Delta Gear, she inspires Mihara to use it to fight the Orphnochs and goes on to become the head of Sousai Children's Home.

Rina Abe is portrayed by Rie Kasai (河西 りえ, Kasai Rie).

==== Kyosuke Tokumoto ====
Kyosuke Tokumoto (徳本 恭輔, Tokumoto Kyōsuke) is a Ryusei School alumnus who tries to use the Kaixa Gear, but failed to out of fear due to its fatal side effects. After finding and using the Delta Gear before it was stolen by former classmate Aki Sawada, Tokumoto comes to believe that it is rightfully his due to its megalomaniacal side effects and joins forces with Ken Arai to kidnap Mari Sonoda in an attempt to lure out Sawada and take the Delta Gear back, only to be killed by Sawada.

Kyosuke Tokumoto is portrayed by Shun Saeki (佐伯 俊, Saeki Shun).

==== Shuji Mihara ====
Shuji Mihara (三原 修二, Mihara Shūji) is an initially cowardly and pessimistic alumnus of the Ryusei School who desires to live a normal life and not involve himself with the Orphnochs. After his classmate Rina Abe is hospitalized in a vehicular accident while retrieving the Delta Gear (デルタギア, Deruta Gia), Shuji resolves to overcome his cowardice and join Takumi Inui and Masato Kusaka in fighting the Orphnochs as Kamen Rider Delta (仮面ライダーデルタ, Kamen Rider Deruta). After helping Takumi Inui and Yuji Kiba defeat the Arch Orphnoch, Shuji joins Rina in running the Sousai Children's Home.

Utilizing the Delta Phone (デルタフォン, Deruta Fon) walkie-talkie in conjunction with the Delta Mover (デルタムーバー, Deruta Mūbā) camcorder and the Delta Driver (デルタドライバー, Deruta Doraibā) belt, Shuji can transform into Kamen Rider Delta. Upon transformation, he combines the Delta Phone and Mover to reconfigure the latter from Video Mode (ビデオモード, Bideo Mōdo) to Blaster Mode (ブラスターモード, Burasutā Mōdo). He can also access the Delta Mover's Pointer Mode (ポインターモード, Pointā Mōdo), which allows him to perform the Lucifer's Hammer (ルシファーズハンマー, Rushifāzu Hanmā) Exceed Charge. His personal vehicle is the Jet Sliger (ジェットスライガー, Jetto Suraigā) combat motorcycle. Unlike the other Rider Gears, the Delta Gear can be used by humans and Orphnochs, though it induces megalomania in most of its users.

Shuji Mihara is portrayed by Atsushi Harada (原田 篤, Harada Atsushi).

==== Minor members ====
- Kouta Takamiya (高宮 航太, Takamiya Kōta): An alumnus who died due to the Kaixa Gear's fatal side effect.
- Shoji Inukai (犬飼 彰司, Inukai Shōji): An alumnus who is killed by the Crocodile Orphnoch. Shoji Inukai is portrayed by Takuma Watanabe (渡辺 琢磨, Watanabe Takuma).
- Kiyotaka Nishida (西田 清高, Nishida Kiyotaka): An alumnus who temporarily assumes the Kaixa Gear, using it to deplete the Crocodile Orphnoch's first life, only to die in Mr. Masuda's arms due to the Kaixa Gear's fatal side effect. Kiyotaka Nishida is portrayed by Yoshiaki Kawasaki (河崎 芳明, Kawasaki Yoshiaki).
- Takahisa Shindo (神道 貴久, Shindō Takahisa): An alumnus who uses the Kaixa Gear to battle the Crocodile Orphnoch against his classmates' protests, only for the Orphnoch to knock the belt off of him, causing Shindo to revert and disintegrate from the belt's fatal side effect. Takahisa Shindo is portrayed by Shintaro Chikada (近田 慎太郎, Chikada Shintarō).
- Haruko Kamijo (上条 晴子, Kamijō Haruko): An alumnus who is killed by the Crocodile Orphnoch. Haruko Kamijo is portrayed by Hiroko Hayashi (林 裕子, Hayashi Hiroko).
- Saya Kimura (木村 沙耶, Kimura Saya): The first user of the Delta Gear who takes on a part-time job at Kikuchi Dry Cleaning and intended to hand off the Delta Gear to Takumi Inui before she is killed by Aki Sawada. Saya Kimura is portrayed by Mai Saito (斉藤 麻衣, Saitō Mai).
- Asami Ito (伊藤 麻美, Itō Asami): An alumnus who tries to take the Delta Gear, only to be killed by Yuki Kawachi. Asami Ito is portrayed by Kaoru Kurasawa (倉澤 薫, Kurasawa Kaoru).
- Ken Arai (新井 賢, Arai Ken): An alumnus who temporarily uses the Delta Gear and became obsessed with it due to its megalomaniacal side effect. He joins forces with Kyosuke Tokumoto to kidnap Mari Sonoda, lure Aki Sawada into a trap, and get the Delta Gear back, only to be killed by Sawada. Ken Arai is portrayed by Hirohito Honda (本田 博仁, Honda Hirohito).
- Yuki Kawachi (河内 勇樹, Kawachi Yūki): An alumnus who briefly uses the Delta Gear, succumbs to its side effect, and attacks Ken Arai and kills Asami Ito over it. After being attacked and fatally wounded by the Frog Orphnoch, Kawachi calls Masato Kusaka for help and claims that Aki Sawada had taken the Delta Gear before dying of his injuries. Yuki Kawachi is portrayed by Kenta Hinokio (檜尾 健太, Hinokio Kenta).
- Shingo Ota (太田 信吾, Ōta Shingo): An alumnus who is killed by the Spider Orphnoch. Shingo Ota is portrayed by Takuji Kawakubo (川久保 拓司, Kawakubo Takuji).

=== Masahiko Minami ===
Masahiko Minami (南 雅彦, Minami Masahiko) is a heartless and corrupt high-ranking officer of the National Police Agency and mad scientist who believes monsters such as Orphnochs deserved to be experimented on or used as weapons. He also believes in using others regardless of species for personal gain and eliminating hindrances. After halting a police investigation into Yuka Osada so he can use her in his experiments, he arranges a deal with Smart Brain to use the Crab Orphnoch as well before capturing Osada. However, his captives escape while Minami is eventually killed by a vengeful Yuji Kiba.

Masahiko Minami is portrayed by Atsushi Ogawa (小川 敦史, Ogawa Atsushi).

== Spin-off characters ==
=== Leo ===
Leo (レオ, Reo) is a foreign English-speaking Orphnoch and member of Smart Brain who uses the Psyga Gear (サイガギア, Saiga Gia), one of two "perfect" Rider Gears developed by Smart Brain that can only be used by Orphnochs, to transform into Kamen Rider Psyga (仮面ライダーサイガ, Kamen Raidā Saiga), and appears exclusively in the film Kamen Rider 555: Paradise Lost. He leads the Orphnochs in their crusade to exterminate humanity under the personal supervision of Kyoji Murakami until he is killed in battle by Takumi Inui as Kamen Rider Faiz.

Utilizing the Psyga Phone (サイガフォン, Saiga Fon) in conjunction with the Psyga Driver (サイガドライバー, Saiga Doraibā) belt, Leo can transform into Kamen Rider Psyga. While transformed, he is equipped with the Flying Attacker (フライングアタッカー, Furaingu Atakkā) jet pack, which has an alternate Booster Rifle Mode (ブースターライフルモード, Būsutā Raifuru Mōdo). He can also separate the Flying Attacker's joysticks into the twin bladed Psyga Tonfa Edges (サイガトンファーエッジ, Saiga Tonfā Ejji), which allow him to perform the Psyga Slash (サイガスラッシュ, Saiga Surasshu) Exceed Charge.

Leo is portrayed by Peter Ho (ピーター・ホー, Pītā Hō).

=== Smart Queen ===
Smart Queen (スマートクイーン, Sumāto Kuīn) is an Orphnoch, the "mascot" of Smart Brain, and a secretary to the company's chief who assumes the appearance of Mari Sonoda and appears exclusively in the web series Kamen Rider Genms: Smart Brain and the 1000% Crisis and Kamen Rider Outsiders. She uses the Delta Gear to fight Kuroto Dan, who kills her.

Smart Queen is portrayed by Yuria Haga, who also portrays Mari Sonoda.

=== Rena Kurumi ===
Rena Kurumi (胡桃 玲菜, Kurumi Rena) is the leader of Smart Brain's Orphnoch extermination unit who appears exclusively in the V-Cinema Kamen Rider 555 20th: Paradise Regained. She carries the Muez Gear (ミューズギア, Myūzu Gia), allowing her to become Kamen Rider Muez (仮面ライダーミューズ, Kamen Raidā Myūzu). Due to allowing Takumi and Mari to escape, she is branded a traitor and killed by the android Kitazaki.

Utilizing the Muez Phone (ミューズフォン, Myūzu Fon) in conjunction with the Muez Driver (ミューズドライバー, Myūzu Doraibā) belt, Rena can transform into Kamen Rider Muez. While transformed, she gains the use of a Predictive AI function that allows her to predict a target's next moves and react accordingly. She also dual wields the twin Muez Edge (ミューズエッジ, Myūzu Ejji) daggers, which can combine into a sword.

Rena Kurumi is portrayed by Rumika Fukuda (福田 ルミカ, Fukuda Rumika).

=== Jotaro Kikuchi ===
Jotaro Kikuchi (菊池 条太郎, Kikuchi Jōtarō) is Keitaro's nephew who appears exclusively in the V-Cinema Kamen Rider 555 20th: Paradise Regained.

Jotaro Kikuchi is portrayed by Daiji Asakawa (浅川 大治, Asakawa Daiji).
