= Kamen Rider 555: Paradise Lost =

Kamen Rider 555 the Movie: Paradise Lost
- Cover art of the Blu-ray.

Japanese name
- Kanji: 劇場版 仮面ライダー555 パラダイス・ロスト
Transcriptions
- Revised Hepburn: Gekijōban Kamen Raidā Faizu: Paradaisu Rosuto
- Directed by: Ryuta Tasaki
- Written by: Toshiki Inoue
- Based on: Kamen Rider 555 by Toshiki Inoue
- Produced by: Ishimori Productions; Toei
- Starring: Kento Handa; Yuria Haga; Ken Mizorogi; Kōhei Murakami; Masayuki Izumi; Yoshika Kato; Mitsuru Karahashi; Mei Kurokawa; Peter Ho
- Cinematography: Fumio Matsumura
- Edited by: Naoki Osada
- Music by: Hayato Matsuo
- Production company: Toei
- Distributed by: Toei Co. Ltd
- Release dates: August 16, 2003; June 21, 2009 (Blu-Ray)
- Running time: 81 minutes; 93 (Director's Cut)
- Country: Japan
- Language: Japanese

Kamen Rider 555 the Movie: Paradise Lost (劇場版 仮面ライダー555 パラダイス・ロスト, Gekijōban Kamen Raidā Faizu Paradaisu Rosuto) is a Japanese dystopian film served as the film adaptation of the 2003 tokusatsu series Kamen Rider 555. It was released during the run of the series as a double feature alongside Bakuryu Sentai Abaranger: Abare Summer is Freezing! on August 16, 2003. A Blu-Ray reissue of the movie was released on June 21, 2009.

== Plot ==
In an alternate timeline, Smart Brain has accomplished its goal of world domination — with 90% of Earth's population being Orphnochs while the human race has diminished to near-extinction. Takumi Inui, the user of the Faiz Gear, was regarded as mankind's savior until he was presumed killed during an attack by Smart Brain's Riotroopers. Since then, his friend Mari Sonoda has formed a human resistance group that have staged attacks on Smart Brain's headquarters in an attempt to steal the top-secret "Emperor Belts", but to no avail. The Orphnochs Yuji Kiba, Naoya Kaido and Yuka Osada wish to see both Orphnochs and humans co-exist in peace, but they are not taken kindly by the humans while Smart Brain chief Kyoji Murakami (who is now reduced to a head in a water tank) reminds them that humans no longer have a place on Earth. Murakami then discloses the existence of the Emperor Belts by introducing the Orphnoch Leo, who changes into the powerful Kamen Rider Psyga.

Meanwhile, in a human refugee camp known as the "Paradise", Takumi has been living a different life as a cobbler named Takeshi and shares a home with a girl named Mina. When Yuji, Naoya and Yuka approach the human resistance and notify them of Psyga's power, Paradise is suddenly invaded by Riotroopers. During the attack, Masato Kusaka battles Psyga as Kamen Rider Kaixa, but is quickly defeated and killed. Psyga attempts to take the Kaixa Belt, but he is warded off by the three Orphnochs allied with the humans. That night, Takeshi and Mari meet at a masquerade ball, but when Riotroopers ambush the party, Takeshi regains his memories as Takumi and once again becomes Kamen Rider Faiz - who is reunited with Auto Vajin while dispatching the attackers. Takumi, however, is not pleased that Mari had spread rumors of him being mankind's savior while he was away. Furthermore, members of the human resistance suspect he is an Orphnoch himself due to his ability to become Faiz. Mina reveals to Takumi that years ago, her father found him badly wounded from the previous Riotrooper attack and implanted false memories in him. Shortly after giving Takumi back his Faiz Blaster, Mina is fatally shot by resistance member Mizuhara - who steals the Faiz Belt. Yuji kills Mizuhara in self-defense and recovers the Faiz belt before handing it back to Takumi, but the resistance exile Yuji, Naoya and Yuka from the group until they prove themselves they can steal the Emperor Belts.

The next day, the three Orphnochs enter Smart Brain headquarters to fulfill their mission — only for Murakami to unleash the gargantuan Elasmotherium Orphenoch on them. Yuka is gored to death and Naoya is eaten alive by the large beast while Smart Lady tricks Yuji into thinking that Mari sold them out. Meanwhile, Smart Brain stages another attack on Paradise. Using a special serum devised by Professor Nomura, Keitaro Kikuchi manages to change into Kaixa and save Mari from an Orphnoch, but the Kaixa belt quickly dissolves into dust as a side-effect. In the ensuing chaos, Psyga kidnaps Mari; this causes dissension among the ranks of the resistance while Takumi races to Tokyo to rescue Mari. At Smart Brain Super Arena, Mari is to be fed to the Elasmotherium Orphnoch in front of millions watching the live execution, but Takumi interrupts the event, changing into Faiz and battling the behemoth. Auto Vajin is destroyed during the fight and Faiz is further outnumbered when Psyga interferes. As the Elasmotherium Orphnoch is caged to prevent it from destroying the stadium, Faiz slices Psyga in half with the Faiz Edge. Yuji suddenly appears in the arena, wearing the second Emperor Belt and changing into Kamen Rider Orga. Orga forces Takumi out of his Kamen Rider form but witnesses him transform into the Wolf Orphnoch, to everyone's surprise. Yuji is forced to change into Horse Orphnoch to battle Takumi before both combatants change back into their Kamen Rider modes while Mari is captured again to be fed to the Elasmotherium Orphnoch. Faiz changes into Blaster Form to defeat Orga. When Mari is about to be eaten, Orga sacrifices himself to save her while Faiz uses his Faiz Blaster to destroy the monster. A dying Yuji makes Takumi promise to fulfill his dream of peace between the humans and Orphnochs, while Smart Lady has Murakami's head crushed under executive orders. As the crowd stares at Takumi and Mari in silence, the pair walk out of the arena with Takumi telling Mari they will go anywhere until they find a place to live.

== Production ==
Kamen Rider 555: Paradise Lost had scenes filmed at Saitama Super Arena. On the ending credits, a large "THANK YOU!" sign ("SEE YOU AGAIN!" in the Director's Cut) is made out of the names of the crowd members in the stadium for the final battle scene.

== Cast ==
- Takumi Inui (乾 巧, Inui Takumi): Kento Handa
- Mari Sonoda (園田 真理, Sonoda Mari): Yuria Haga
- Keitaro Kikuchi (菊池 啓太郎, Kikuchi Keitarō): Ken Mizorogi
- Masato Kusaka (草加 雅人, Kusaka Masato): Kōhei Murakami
- Yuji Kiba (木場 勇治, Kiba Yūji): Masayuki Izumi (泉 政行, Izumi Masayuki)
- Yuka Osada (長田 結花, Osada Yuka): Yoshika Kato
- Naoya Kaido (海堂 直也, Kaidō Naoya): Mitsuru Karahashi
- Kyoji Murakami (村上 峡児, Murakami Kyōji): Katsuyuki Murai
- Smart Lady (スマートレディ, Sumāto Redi): Hitomi Kurihara
- Mina (ミナ): Mei Kurokawa
- Mina (Childhood) (ミナ（幼少期）, Mina (Yōshōki)): Mirai Shida
- Mizuhara (水原): Mokomichi Hayami
- Nomura (野村): Hiroo Otaka (大高 洋夫, Ōtaka Hiroo)
- Leo (レオ, Reo): Peter Ho
- Faces (顔, Kao): Gorō Naya, Seizō Katō, Shōzō Iizuka
- Greengrocers (八百屋, Yaoya): Kazue Tsunogae (角替 和枝, Tsunogae Kazue; Cameo), Kazumasa Taguchi (田口 主将, Taguchi Kazumasa; Cameo)
- Mina's Father (ミナの父, Mina no Chichi): Kanji Tsuda (Cameo)
- Lion Orphnoch (ライオンオルフェノク, Raion Orufenoku; Voice): Tsuyoshi Koyama (Cameo)
- Narration (ナレーション): Eiichiro Suzuki (鈴木 英一郎, Suzuki Eiichirō)

== Theme song ==
- "Justiφ's -Accel Mix-"
  - Lyrics: Shoko Fujibayashi
  - Composition: Kazuto Sato
  - Arrangement: Kazunori Miyake
  - Artist: ISSA
