= List of Kamen Rider 555 episodes =

Kamen Rider 555 is the 2003 incarnation of the Kamen Rider franchise. It ran for 50 episodes, with the 50th episode marked as "FINAL", and was originally broadcast on TV Asahi from January 26, 2003 to January 18, 2004. All 50 episodes were written by Toshiki Inoue. On October 5, 2003 (The day that episode 36 aired) the show used TV Asahi's current logo.

== Episodes ==
No.	Title	Directed by	Original release date
1	"The Start of a Trip"; Transliteration: "Tabi no Hajimari" (Japanese: 旅の始まり)	Ryuta Tasaki	January 26, 2003
An intruder breaks into the research lab of Smart Brain and steals a mysterious device the company is working on. Yuji Kiba leads a peaceful life until a truck hits his car, killing his parents and himself in a coma. Two years later, he awakens to find his life in ruins — his girlfriend Chie had left him for his cousin, and his house is gone. In a rage, Yuji kills his cousin with his newfound Orphenoch powers. Meanwhile, Mari Sonoda is traveling towards Tokyo on her motorcycle as Takumi Inui follows her believing she has taken his bag. However, the two are attacked by an Orphenoch. Mari attempts to use the Faiz belt to fight, but fails. She pushes Takumi to use it, and he defeats the Orphenoch.
2	"The Belt's Power"; Transliteration: "Beruto no Chikara" (Japanese: ベルトの力)	Ryuta Tasaki	February 2, 2003
After obtaining his actual bag from the police, Takumi and Mari continue to reluctantly travel together to Tokyo. Takumi ditches Mari but he comes back when he realizes they have switched bags just in time to save her from an Elephant Orphenoch. Yuji still has not come to terms with what has happened to him. He tries to kill himself but finds he can't. He meets up with his old girlfriend thinking they can start over. She turns on him when the police arrive to talk to her about his cousin's death. He later kills her.
3	"The King's Sleep..."; Transliteration: "Ō no Nemuri..." (Japanese: 王の眠り･･･)	Takao Nagaishi	February 9, 2003
Yuji goes off with Smart Lady after killing Chie. Takumi still refuses to help Mari protect the Faiz Gear and leaves her when he finds that she has been lying to him about her wrist being hurt. A girl named Yuka Osada, who is ignored by her family and bullied at school by her own sister, begins corresponding with a guy named Keitaro Kikuchi. Mari later meets Keitaro after a road accident and helps him deliver his company's dry cleaning. At Kumamoto Airport, the Ox Orphenoch attacks a man. Meanwhile, two tunnel construction workers discover an abandoned school deep underground and are trapped there by a cave-in. The Ox Orphenoch attacks Mari for the belt but Takumi uses it to save her by destroying the monster. Yuka kills herself when she slips down a flight of stairs but she resurrects as the Crane Orphenoch.
4	"My Name"; Transliteration: "Ore no Namae" (Japanese: おれの名前)	Takao Nagaishi	February 16, 2003
Keitaro and Takumi take Mari to the hospital after the battle with the Ox Orphenoch. Meanwhile, Akai, the Cactus Orphenoch, kills a fuel station attendant, much to the annoyance of his partner, Midorikawa, the Mantis Orphenoch. Yuka returns home as her sister is knocked down by a car. Yuka finds her, but is blamed for the accident and is kicked out of the house. The next morning, Mari finds Keitaro and the Faiz Gear gone. He intends to use it to realize his dream of protecting people but is attacked by the two Orphenochs. He tries to use the Gear, but it won't work for him. Takumi and Mari arrive as the Cactus Orphenoch becomes Faiz. Yuka transforms into the Crane Orphenoch and kills her school gym class. Faiz kills the Mantis Orphenoch, but when he goes to attack Mari, the Auto Vajin motorcycle transforms into a robot to protect her. It defeats Faiz, allowing Takumi to recover the belt and kill the Orphenoch. Takumi finally agrees to keep the belt as Yuka meets Yuji.
5	"Original"; Transliteration: "Orijinaru" (Japanese: オリジナル)	Hidenori Ishida	February 23, 2003
Takumi, Keitaro and Mari go to see her father as he will know about the Orphenochs. Yuji takes Yuka to see someone who can help her. All five end up at the Smart Brain building in Tokyo, Mari's father being the president. The police investigate the scene of the Crane Orphenoch's attack in the gym. Mari is unable to see her father and as she leaves, Keitaro and Yuka walk right past each other but do not realize that they have been corresponding. Yuji introduces Yuka to Smart Lady, who takes them to Eiichi Toda, the Squid Orphenoch. He tells them about the Orphenoch battle with the humans and kills a man to show them what it's about. Takumi visits an old friend's cafe as Mari helps out with Keitaro's laundry cleaning business. Takumi is caught speeding and is suspended from driving. To pay his fine, Takumi is forced to work for Keitaro. Toda attacks everyone in the cafe, including Takumi's friend. Takumi has Keitaro bring him the Faiz Gear, allowing him to fight the Squid Orphenoch, but it disappears, only to drop dead in front of Yuji and Yuka as one of his victims awakens as the Snake Orphenoch.
6	"Trio × Trio"; Transliteration: "Sannin × Sannin" (Japanese: ３人×３人)	Hidenori Ishida	March 2, 2003
While working in Keitaro's laundry business, Takumi burns some clothes. Mari believes that he is distracted due to what happened to his friend. She goes to visit her father again, with Takumi tagging along. Yuji, unhappy with what Smart Lady tells him of the Orphenochs, attempts to see the Smart Brain president but finds only a blank wall. He leaves, with Takumi and Mari following him. Naoya Kaido, the Snake Orphenoch, awakens but runs off before Yuka can explain what happened to him. Keitaro and Yuka meet again, but don't recognize each other. Takumi and Mari try to steal Yuji's Smart Brain pass card from his car but are caught. Keitaro finds Yuka's phone and returns it but they still don't know who the other is. Naoya goes for a job interview, his new Orphenoch powers allowing him to learn a dark secret about the interviewer. Soeno is assigned to investigate this man. Naoya goes back to learn what has happened to him from both Yuka and Yuji and decides to take revenge on those that have hurt him. At night, Naoya is attacked by the interviewer but kills him as the Snake Orphenoch. Takumi fights him as Faiz but Yuji transforms to stop it.
7	"The Power of Dreams"; Transliteration: "Yume no Chikara" (Japanese: 夢の力)	Ryuta Tasaki	March 9, 2003
Yuji fights Faiz as the Horse Orphenoch to protect the Snake Orphenoch and even stops Faiz's finishing attack, injuring Takumi. Naoya abandons the hurt Yuji, despite being saved by him. The next day, Mari announces that she has a job interview at a salon. Smart Lady tells Yuka that she must help Yuji lose his remaining humanity by sharing her own hatred of humans. Keitaro agrees to help a woman get her son to come home, much to Takumi's annoyance. Yuji and Yuka learn that Naoya had an accident when he was younger. Meanwhile, Naoya returns to his old university to annoy the music students. He is set upon by a group of students. Mari goes to the salon as Naoya kills a student with his Orphenoch powers. Keitaro finds the woman's son, Kazuhiko Kuroda, but he refuses to go home. Naoya tells Yuji that he's a monster and will do as he wants. He returns to the university and meets Kazuhiko and helps him play the guitar. The Owl Orphenoch attacks at the university but Takumi fights it as Faiz but it retreats.
8	"The Protector of Dreams"; Transliteration: "Yume no Mamoribito" (Japanese: 夢の守り人)	Ryuta Tasaki	March 16, 2003
The Owl Orphenoch retreats from Faiz. Keitaro tries to get Kazuhiko to see his mother, but he refuses until he can prove to her that he is serious about music. Yuka tries to talk to Naoya but he is accused of killing another student. Mari blames Takumi for her poor performance at the salon and leaves. Takumi goes after her and gets her to come back. The next day she gets the job despite taking slightly longer than usual. Yuka catches Kazuhiko's teacher sabotaging his bike as he did with Naoya's. The Scarab Beetle Orphenoch stalks Mari but Takumi stops him. Naoya plays his guitar for Yuka as Takumi fights the Orphenoch. Yuji fights the professor as Auto Vajin joins Faiz by attacking both him and the Orphenoch. Faiz destroys the Orphenoch anyway as does Yuji with the Owl Orphenoch. Naoya destroys his guitar...
9	"Enter, the President"; Transliteration: "Shachō Tōjō" (Japanese: 社長登場)	Takao Nagaishi	March 23, 2003
Faiz destroys the Scarab Beetle Orphenoch. Yuji and Naoya try to decide what they should do next. Naoya wants to attack humans, but Yuji believes they should protect them. Keitaro decides that he, Takumi and Mari should investigate a prowler in the area but Mari is summoned to the Smart Brain building where she and Takumi are invited to a dinner with Kyoji Murakami, the new head of the company. Keitaro learns that the prowler stole food from several houses, but also cleaned them before leaving. Murakami tells Takumi and Mari that the Faiz Gear belongs to Smart Brain and he wants it back. Mari gives it to him. Later, Yuji lends them some money to pay their cafe bill, allowing Mari to get his phone number. At night, Takumi, Mari and Keitaro chase the prowler, actually the Snail Orphenoch. Kamen Rider Faiz arrives and fights the Orphenoch as Murakami uses his Orphenoch powers to kill those that would remove him as president. The Snail Orphenoch retreats and Faiz is revealed to be Naoya.
10	"The Enigmatic Rider"; Transliteration: "Nazo no Raidā" (Japanese: 謎のライダー)	Takao Nagaishi	March 30, 2003
Smart Lady gives the Snail Orphenoch one last chance to properly attack a human. Naoya shows Yuji and Yuka the Faiz Gear and tells them that they should think about what they're doing before he has to attack them too. Yuji goes to see Murakami about his plans. Yuka attacks three men as the Crane Orphenoch while Takumi becomes depressed over no longer being Faiz. Naoya later attacks Takumi on his bike but leaves when Murakami calls with a job for Faiz. The Snail Orphenoch finally makes a kill. Naoya and Yuji fight as Faiz and the Horse Orphenoch but Naoya is unable to deal the final blow allowing Yuji to defeat Faiz. Keitaro takes the Faiz Belt from Naoya but he is attacked by the Snail Orphenoch. Takumi saves him and transforms into Faiz and destroys the Orphenoch, watched by another Rider...
11	"The Enigmatic Belt"; Transliteration: "Nazo no Beruto" (Japanese: 謎のベルト)	Takao Nagaishi	April 6, 2003
Takumi destroys the Snail Orphenoch as Faiz. Murakami goes to meet with the members of Lucky Clover. During the meeting, a drunk man injures J's dog, Chaco, and is killed for it. Naoya is recovering from his fight with Yuji, but takes it out on Yuka. Yuka resumes her mail correspondence with Keitaro as Mari and Takumi are sent a picture of a new Rider belt by Inukai, a former classmate of Mari. They go to meet Inukai but Mari encounters Naoya instead. J of Lucky Clover is sent to kill Faiz as Inukai is found dead, killed by an Orphenoch. Takumi is attacked by J as the Crocodile Orphenoch. Keitaro falls in love with Yuka. Faiz gets beaten by the Crocodile Orphenoch but is saved by the new Rider.
12	"Ryūsei School"; Transliteration: "Ryūsei-juku" (Japanese: 流星塾)	Hidenori Ishida	April 13, 2003
Takumi and Mari were able to meet with her friends and teacher from Ryusei School. They discussed that whoever uses the Kaixa Gear will die. They were then attack by an Orphenoch known as J. One of the students transformed into Kaixa, just to get the stuffing beat out of him and die. Just then, Takumi as Faiz, saves the day. But this is a hollow victory as the group of students lost their teacher before he had a chance to tell them what happened on the day of the reunion.
13	"Friend of Foe?"; Transliteration: "Teki ka Mikata ka" (Japanese: 敵か味方か)	Hidenori Ishida	April 20, 2003
After Masuda dies from using the Kaixa Gear, Mari, Takumi, and Keitaro begin looking for Mari's schoolmate Masato Kusaka. Yuji decides not to attack humans but Naoya is still trying to figure out what he wants. Mari finds Masato at fencing practice. Naoya decides to live as a human and takes Yuka out on a pretend date as practice for Mari. Masato and Takumi have a fencing battle as Mari's old schoolmates are attacked by Equisetum Orphenoch. Haruko is killed by the Crocodile Orphenoch. They go to rescue them, with Masato following and transforming into Kamen Rider Kaixa to defeat the Orphenochs.
14	"Takumi's Spirit"; Transliteration: "Takumi no Iji" (Japanese: 巧の意地)	Ryuta Tasaki	April 27, 2003
Masato stays with Mari while the other Ryuseiji go looking for answers about their past. Later, Masato decides to fight with Takumi as Kaixa. Realizing that he was targeted for not wanting to attack humans, Yuji has Naoya and Yuka decide what they want to do from now on. Yuka goes with Yuji. Murakami assigns the Lucky Clover to their tasks, sending J after the Rider belts and Itsuro Takuma after the traitors. Faiz fights the Crocodile Orphenoch as Itsuro attacks Naoya and Yuji. Faiz is defeated by the Orphenoch.
15	"The Fallen Idol ~ φ's vs. χ" Transliteration: "Ochita Gūzō ~ Faizu Tai Kai" (Japanese: 落ちた偶像~ φ's vs χ)	Ryuta Tasaki	May 4, 2003
Yuji and Takumi are defeated and thrown into the river. Itsuro tells Yuka that she is not a traitor to the Orphenochs and leaves. Keitaro and Masato search for Takumi but find Yuji instead. Naoya and Yuka find Takumi. Keitaro finds the dropped Faiz belt. Yuka and Takumi are found by a group of bikers but Yuka kills them as the Crane Orphenoch as Takumi watches. Yuka runs off, finding Yuji. Later, Naoya is again attacked by Itsuro as Kaixa attacks Yuka. Faiz joins in by attacking Kaixa to protect Yuka, but he is defeated by Kaixa's new Side Basshar.
16	"Human Heart"; Transliteration: "Ningen no Kokoro" (Japanese: 人間の心)	Naoki Tamura	May 11, 2003
Takumi almost kills Masato, but Mari stops him and tries to find out why he saved the Orphenoch, but he won't say. Naoya runs away from Yuka, who later meets Takumi and tells of her wish to live as a human. Masato tries to sow discord between Takumi and his friends. Masato and Mari witness the Flying Fish Orphenoch kill a man. Masato fights it, but it escapes. Yuji is contacted by Yoshimasa Morishita, Chie's brother, who is looking for her killer. He is attacked by the Flying Fish Orphenoch, which is fought by Takumi as Faiz and Auto Vajin. Masato arrives and defeats it before attacking Takumi. The two Riders fight again.
17	"Takumi, Revival"; Transliteration: "Takumi, Fukkatsu" (Japanese: 巧、復活)	Naoki Tamura	May 18, 2003
Masato soundly defeats Takumi, who passes out. He doesn't tell both Mari and Keitaro that Masato attacked him nor answers any of their concerns about what has been bothering him. Takumi informs Masato that he is over being Faiz as he can no longer fight Orphenochs due his recent conversation with Yuka. Meanwhile, Yoshimasa recovers in Yuji's apartment and continues his search for his sister's killer. Takumi unwinds at the batting cages where he meets Yuji, who finds him to be a kindred spirit. Mari tells Naoya that Masato is her boyfriend, so he would stop pursuing her. Yoshima later speaks to one of Chie's college classmates who tells him that Chie gets around with other guys. He is outraged then transforms into the Armadillo Orphenoch and kills him. Keitaro witnesses this and calls Takumi while Yuji receives a call from Yoshima saying that he will kill everyone who badmouthed his sister then rampages on the college campus. Takumi realizes he can't just stand by as Orphenochs keep killing innocent people. He becomes Faiz and defeats the Orphenoch much to the joy to both Mari and Keitaro. Masato learns the third belt is called Delta.
18	"Narrow Escape from Death"; Transliteration: "Kyūshi ni Isshō" (Japanese: 九死に一生)	Takao Nagaishi	May 25, 2003
Masato texts Mari that he went off with their old classmate as they went to find out more about the third belt. Keitaro is asked by a customer to help find a serial mud slinger in their neighborhood who keeps dirtying their clothes. Smart Brain continues on their attempts to recover Faiz and Kaixa belts. As a glum mood surrounds the Kiba household, Yuji wonders about the identity of the Faiz user. Meanwhile, a young girl is being followed around town by a clown but quickly evades him. It turns out this girl is the serial mudslinger and is befriended by Keitaro to find out what her motives are. When she makes too many demands of him, he gets angry and the girl runs away. She later runs into the clown at the park and promptly turns into a Toadstool Orphenoch. Takumi comes to the rescue as Faiz. Yuji upon seeing Faiz, transforms and joins the melee to fight him.
19	"Pure White Justice"; Transliteration: "Junpaku no Seigi" (Japanese: 純白の正義)	Takao Nagaishi	June 1, 2003
The battle between Yuji and Faiz ends in a stalemate as the other Orphenoch gets away. Lucky Clover member J is given a final chance to retrieve either belts for the sake of his dog Chaco. Keitaro and Mari learn that young girl's name is Keiko and also find out that she draws people to earn money to buy her amnesiac mother a handbag, hoping that would help recover her memory but it doesn't. They also learn that she is slinging mud on clean clothes is because her happiest moment with her mom is hanging clean laundry which she might never be able to do again as her mom continues to remain in the hospital. The Clown/Toadstool Orphenoch reappears to finish Keiko as Keitaro tries to protect her. Faiz comes and defeats it; however, the Crocodile Orphenoch suddenly shows up and battles him. Faiz completely puts J down for good. Keiko later recovers J's dog Chaco. Her mom's memory soon returns when she smells freshly clean laundry outside her window hung by her and Keitaro. Later, Saeko gets a call telling her she is up next to retrieve the belts...
20	"The Beautiful Assassin"; Transliteration: "Utsukushiki Shikaku" (Japanese: 美しき刺客)	Hidenori Ishida	June 8, 2003
Two members of Lucky Clover, Itsuro and Saeko, are ordered to get the Faiz Gear back and kill all traitors. Saeko meets another Orphenoch that wants to take J's spot. Takumi faces off against Itsuro while Yuji faces both Saeko and the Scorpion Orphenoch. Both fights end up the same: defeat, but Takumi's is much worse because the Centipede Orphenoch that he lost to took his Faiz Gear and transformed into Faiz to kill Takumi and finish his job.
21	"Accelerating Spirits"; Transliteration: "Kasoku Suru Tamashii" (Japanese: 加速する魂)	Hidenori Ishida	June 22, 2003
Takumi and Yuji were blasted away into the river because of the new Faiz. Itsuro, the new Faiz, gloats to Saeko that he will take back the Kaixa Gear as well. Takumi calls Masato to warn him about the new Faiz. Masato returns to fight the new Faiz and takes back the Faiz belt. He gets the belt back to Takumi along with a new gadget that lets him change into his Axel Form. Using this form, he defeats both the Scorpion and Centipede Orphenoch.
22	"Masato's Confession"; Transliteration: "Masato no Kokuhaku" (Japanese: 雅人の告白)	Naoki Tamura	June 29, 2003
The story begins with Yuji and Takumi fighting each other. Yuji is in Orphenoch form and Takumi is in Faiz form. Neither know that the other can transform. Masato comes back from his trip but he doesn't say much about it other than that the others from Ryusei School are fighting. He continues to push Takumi's buttons. He lets Mari know that he likes her. Murakami suggests training a new member for Lucky Clover to replace J. Masato overhears Mari questioning her feelings for Yuji. This upsets Masato. Yuji and Yuka ask Mari to consider going out with Naoya. Yuji and Masato are attacked by Orphenochs. Masto puts on his belt, causing Yuji to realize he is a rider. Murakami and another Orphenoch confront Takumi and Mari, demanding the Faiz belt.
23	"False Friendship"; Transliteration: "Itsuwari no Yūjō" (Japanese: 偽りの友情)	Naoki Tamura	July 6, 2003
Having accidentally found out about Yuji, Masato announced a truce as they fought Saeko and another Orphenoch that had come to kill them. Realizing the fact Yuji did not know of Faiz's true identity, Masato hitched a plan to use that against Yuji as he learned about Lucky Clover.
24	"The Door to Darkness"; Transliteration: "Yami e no Tobira" (Japanese: 闇への扉)	Takao Nagaishi	July 13, 2003
Takumi joined into the fight as he witnessed Masato fighting two Orphenochs as Murakami arrived to stop them. Masato revealed his intention to wanting to join Lucky Clover. Yuji wondered what Masato really is. An enemy or ally? Naoya made another decision as he was rejected by Mari.
25	"The Dark Laboratory"; Transliteration: "Yami no Jikkenshitsu" (Japanese: 闇の実験室)	Takao Nagaishi	July 20, 2003
Smart Brain recovered Faiz and Kaixa as Masato was captured. Mari and others sneaked into Smart Brain to save him. While escaping from Takumi, both of them discovered the entrance to the underground Ryusei School. Over there they stumble into a startling discovery.
26	"Enter, Delta"; Transliteration: "Deruta Tōjō" (Japanese: デルタ登場)	Hidenori Ishida	July 27, 2003
Murakami was disappointed about the loss of the belts as he look for another Lucky Clover candidate. Masato reminded Takumi to kept quiet about what they saw at the school as they met the Ryuseiji later. On the other hand, the remaining Ryuseiji fought over who should keep the Delta belt. A girl appeared at Kikuchi as she offered to work part-time. Delta appeared.
27	"Ryūsei School Breaks Up"; Transliteration: "Ryūseijuku Bunretsu" (Japanese: 流星塾分裂)	Hidenori Ishida	August 3, 2003
Members of the Ryusei School are trying to find the Delta belt and are arguing over it at the same time. Itsuro of Lucky Clover continues to try to kill Yuji. As they are fighting, they run into Keitaro and Saya. Keitaro encourages Saya to run and soon Delta appears on the scene. Everyone thinks that Aki Sawada has the Delta belt. Kyosuke and Arai kidnap Mari to lure out Aki, who continues his murderous rampage as an Orphenoch. Aki kills Kyosuke and Arai as Takumi and Masato arrive on the scene to save Mari. Delta arrives on the scene.
28	"Dark Clover"; Transliteration: "Ankoku no Yotsuba" (Japanese: 暗黒の四葉)	Hidenori Ishida	August 10, 2003
Faiz and Kaixa are fighting Aki with little success. Before Delta can join in, Mari intervenes and Aki escapes. Everyone is still trying to figure out who has the Delta belt. They are beginning to suspect that maybe Saya has it. The belt was originally sent to her. Mari and Masato try to arrange a meeting with Aki. In the meantime, Itsuro meets up with Kitazaki. Anyone who Kitazaki touches dissolves. Three crooks found that out when they tried to steal from Kitazaki. Aki eventually meets Masato and Mari. He tells Mari that he has always liked her. By killing her he can completely throw away his humanity and grow stronger as an Orphenoch. He and Masato transform and fight. Takumi arrives to fight Aki as does Saya. Aki kills Saya and gets the Delta belt. He is made a part of Lucky Clover.
29	"Excellent Bike"; Transliteration: "Chōzetsu Baiku" (Japanese: 超絶バイク)	Naoki Tamura	August 17, 2003
Kitazaki now has the Delta gear. Masato vows to get it back. Kitazaki proposes a bet with the other members of Lucky Clover to see who can kill Yuji first. The winner gets to slap everyone on the arm. This strikes terror in Itsuro who is scared of Kitazaki. Aki goes after Yuji and knocks out Naoya and Yuka. Itsuro arrives and joins in the battle. Yuji manages to get away and is found by Saeko. As Takumi goes to deliver Yuji's laundry he comes upon the fight and transforms. He immediately attacks Yuji, who is still in Orphenoch form. As they are fighting Kitazaki arrives on Delta's motorcycle. Both get knocked around by Kitazaki and transform back to normal. Yuji realizes that Takumi is Faiz and Takumi realizes that Yuji is an Orphenoch.
30	"Masato's Trap"; Transliteration: "Masato no Wana" (Japanese: 雅人の罠)	Naoki Tamura	August 24, 2003
The battle between Yuji, Takumi, and Kitazaki continues. Itsuro interferes, allowing Takumi and Yuji to escape. Masato meets up with Aki and tries to convince him to get the Delta gear for him. Aki refuses and they fight. When Aki is kicked over the balcony he retreats from the fight. Mari talks to Yuji and Yuka talks to Takumi both begin to realize they are on the same side. They fight together to save a woman from another Orphenoch. Masato overhears their conversation and sees them fight the other Orphenoch together. He doesn't like this change. He meets up with Masato and convinces him he only attacked him to get into Smart Brain so he could destroy it from the inside. He lies to Yuji and tells him Takumi is the one who can't be trusted. He tells him that Takumi is only fighting as Faiz to test his own power. Masato knocks out Takumi and steals his belt. He transforms into Faiz and attacks Yuji to make Yuji hate Takumi again and not trust him. He then lies to Takumi telling him that Yuji attacked Takumi and stole the belt. The story ends with Kitazaki transforming into Delta and attacking Masato and Takumi.
31	"Origami Tears"; Transliteration: "Origami no Namida" (Japanese: 折り紙の涙)	Nobuhiro Suzumura	August 31, 2003
Masato continues to sow the seeds of distrust between Yuji and Takumi. Takumi fights Aki but hesitates to finish him off. Aki takes advantage of this and fights him off. Aki is still battling his humanity. He agrees to meet up with Mari. When Mari goes to meet Aki she is attached by another Orphenoch. Aki saves her. Masato arrives to fight Aki.
32	"Intertwined Threads"; Transliteration: "Karamiau Ito" (Japanese: 絡み合う糸)	Nobuhiro Suzumura	September 7, 2003
As Masato is about to deliver the rider kick, Mari intervenes. Takumi gets there just in time to save her by blocking the kick with his bike. Itsuro tries to steal the Delta gear from Kitizaki. Mari arranges to meet with Aki again. However, before she does, Takumi meets him. Aki tells Takumi that Mari is the only one who can help him become human again. When Mari arrives she is attached by Saeko's Orphenoch assassin again. As Takumi battles him he encourages Aki to take Mari to safety. After saving her again Aki punches her hard enough to send her flying into a building. She is hospitalized. Naoya and Keitaro manage to save a child from a fire. Masato makes Yuji believe that it was Takumi that injured Mari.
33	"Mari Dies"; Transliteration: "Mari, Shisu" (Japanese: 真理、死す)	Takao Nagaishi	September 14, 2003
Masato continues to blame Takumi for Mari's injuries. He believes Takumi's soft attitude about Orphenochs lead to Mari being injured. Takumi and Yuji decide to meet up again to fight. This time they fight until both are exhausted. Kitazaki tries to join in the fight as Delta but both Yuji and Takumi make it cleare that this is a fight between the two of them. Kitizaki decides to fight the winner. Kitazaki is losing interest in the Delta gear. After telling Itsuro that he threw the belt away, he gives it to Aki. Takumi decides he no longer has the right to be Faiz and gives the Faiz belt to Keitaro. Both the Delta belt and the Faiz belt both end up being given to Masato. Yuji finds out that Takumi is not the one that injured Mari.
34	"True Form"; Transliteration: "Shinjitsu no Sugata" (Japanese: 真実の姿)	Takao Nagaishi	September 21, 2003
Takumi wants to revive Mari and Masato knows that the only chance she has lies with Smart Brain. Masato wants to give away the three belts for her life, but decides that his mission to destroy Smart Brain is more important than Mari. Takumi goes to the chief of Smart Brain and asks to revive Mari. He says that he'll only do it if he becomes a member of Lucky Clover by killing Aki. However, he says that it's impossible because he is not an Orphnoch. Meanwhile, Masato manages to get the most scared student of the Ryusei School to fight as Kamen Rider Delta and they both try to defeat the Lobster and Spider Orphnoch. Takumi arrives on the scene and, in a dramatic fashion, transforms into the Wolf Orphnoch to kill Aki.
35	"The Resurrection Riddle"; Transliteration: "Fukkatsu no Nazo" (Japanese: 復活の謎)	Hidenori Ishida	September 28, 2003
Since only Lucky Clover members have complete access to Smart Brain, Takumi has decided to defeat Aki and become a member of Lucky Clover. He transforms into the Wolf Orphenoch to fight him. The others can't believe what they are seeing. Masato thinks that Yuji knew about Takumi's true identity. He wants to know what else they are hiding. Yuji seems to think that it is Masato that is hiding something since he is such a liar. Takumi signs Mari out of the hospital and brings here to the Smart Brain hospital for an operation. He calls Keitaro and tells him he is coming home with Mari. Orphenochs attack Shuji in order to get the Delta belt from him. As Delta he defeats them. Masato, Takumi, Keitaro, and Mari have a picnic. Mari tells the guys about a memory from childhood that she had when she was in the hospital. It was from the Ryusei Reunion. They were attacked by an Orphenoch. Saeko and Itsuro show up to get Takumi. Masato and Takumi transform and fight them. Takumi loses his belt and is forced to transform into an Orphenoch when Itsuro attacks Mari. She realizes that he is the Orphenoch from her memory.
36	"Restored Memories"; Transliteration: "Yomigaeru Kioku" (Japanese: 蘇る記憶)	Hidenori Ishida	October 5, 2003
As the story begins, Naoya begins to show an interest in the boy he saved from the fire. Everyone is still in shock about Takumi being an Orphenoch. Mari and Keitaro imagine seeing him in familiar places. Mari is starting to remember the reunion. She remembers that Masato was there even though he insists he wasn't. She and Keitaro get Takumi to come back home. He stays for a little while but leaves again when he realizes that the others are uncomfortable around him. Murakami tracks him down and shows him a video of him in Orphenoch form at the reunion. As the story concludes, it seems as though Takumi is going to try to defeat Yuji, who transformed into Faiz to protect Mari and Keitaro, to get the Faiz belt back and join Lucky Clover.
37	"Kaixa's Justice"; Transliteration: "Kaiza no Seigi" (Japanese: カイザの正義)	Nobuhiro Suzumura	October 12, 2003
Takumi runs from his fight with Yuji, who thinks that Takumi is afraid of being the wolf Orphenoch and is trying to kill himself. The Lucky Clover think that Takumi will completely through away his humanity and become one of them. Mari continues to confront Masato about the night of the reunion. For some reason he refuses to tell Mari he was at the reunion. Takumi calls Yuji who comes to meet him. He meets up with Takumi who is running from the Lucky Clover. The program concludes with Yuji interrupting a fight between Takumi in Orphenoch form and Masato in Rider form.
38	"The Wandering Spirit"; Transliteration: "Samayoeru Tamashii" (Japanese: 彷徨える魂)	Nobuhiro Suzumura	October 19, 2003
Saeko continues to pursure Takumi for Lucky Clover. Takumi continues to resist. Mari tells Masato that she trusts Takumi. Masato implies that Mari's memories of the reunion might be true. He tells his friends to be on the look out for Takumi. As Masato's friends are attacked for the Delta belt, Takumi arrives and transforms into Delta to save them then passes out. As the program concludes, both Takumi and Yuji are fighting members of Lucky Clover.
39	"Faiz 2"; Transliteration: "Faizu Tsū" (Japanese: ファイズ２)	Naoki Tamura	October 26, 2003
As the story begins, Masato and Yuji come to Takumi's rescue. Later Masato tells Mari that he doesn't remember everything about the night of the reunion. Masato and Mari both go to see Aki to ask what happened the night of the reunion. He tells them. According to Aki, Takumi came upon the students at the reunion as they were being attacked by other Orphenochs. Takumi continues to think it was him until Mari talks to him and returns the Faiz belt. Takumi doesn't want to take the belt as he is still afraid of himself and doesn't know when he will lose his humanity like Aki did. Masato goes off to battle Lucky Clover members. He comes across Kitazaki and battles him. Mari, Takumi and a friend of Mari's come across Masato as he has been beat down by Kitazaki. The women try to transform and fight but have little success. Takumi grabs the Faiz belt and transforms. Mari tosses him a new device to use in the fight. This allows Faiz to change into his Blaster Form.
40	"Proof of Humanity"; Transliteration: "Ningen no Akashi" (Japanese: 人間の証)	Naoki Tamura	November 9, 2003
As the story begins, Kitazaki loses a battle to Faiz. He can't believe he lost. Takumi still doesn't quite believe in himself and gives the belt back to Mari. He then goes to the Lucky Clover bar to deliver a challenge. Later he meets up with Aki who tells him more about what happened after the reunion. He then sucker punches Takumi and takes his place in the fight with Lucky Clover. He calls Mari and asks her to save Takumi. As Aki is fighting Lucky Clover, Masato shows up to fight him. Shuji finally decides to enter the battle with the Orphenochs as Delta and shows up as Masato starts to battle the rest of Lucky Clover. Aki dies as a result of his battle with Masato. As the story comes to a close, Takumi seems to have made the decision to fight alongside Masato and Shuji as a human-Faiz.
41	"Capture Commences"; Transliteration: "Hokaku Kaishi" (Japanese: 捕獲開始)	Takao Nagaishi	November 16, 2003
As the story begins, the three riders transform to fight Orphenochs. Mari catches up to them as the fight concludes and begs Takumi to return home with them. He returns home with her. Lucky Clover wants to recruit Yuka as a member. She is strong and has the potential to become stronger. Yuka, Naoya, and Keitaro volunteer with the kids at an orphanage where Tereou, the boy Naoya saved, lives. Strangers warn the police to quit investigating the “incidents” because they are accidents. Meanwhile, those same strangers continue to follow Yuka and her friends as they head to an amusement park. The strangers seem to be conducting experiments of some sort.Keitaro tries to make a move on Yuka and gets rebuffed. She runs off and is followed by one of the strangers. She is approached by Lucky Clover and is forced to fight to show her strength. Masato and Takumi come to her aid.
42	"Broken Wings"; Transliteration: "Oreta Tsubasa" (Japanese: 折れた翼)	Takao Nagaishi	November 23, 2003
The strangers are a part of the police department. They are conducting experiments with the idea that the human component can be extracted from the Orphenochs allowing them to kill the monsters. Yuji and Takumi decide to talk to the police. They believe they can convince them that not all Orphenochs are bad. Mari is afraid that she will eventually become an Orphenoch because of the Smart Brain experiments. Masato assures her that the experiment was a failure. Yuka turns herself into the police in hopes of keeping her friends safe. She is brought to the secret research facility. Takumi and Yuji meet with the police and offer to trade themselves for Yuka. An Orphenoch already at the center rescues Yuka. Takumi and Yuji come upon them and allow the Orphenoch who helped to escape. After Takumi answers Keitaro's call, Yuji and Yuka are surprised by the police. The show concludes with Takumi defending the Orphenoch who saved Yuka.
43	"Red Balloon"; Transliteration: "Akai Fūsen" (Japanese: 赤い風船)	Hidenori Ishida	November 30, 2003
Yuji begins to wonder if humans and Orphenochs can live together. Osada goes to live with Mari and Keitaro. She realizes that Keitaro is her email friend. She runs away and the others search for her. The police search for her and Yuji. One of the Lucky Clover approaches her after Keitaro finds her. Osada transforms and defends Keitaro. He sees her true form. Meanwhile, Yuji and Takumi are fighting off Orphenochs and police that are trying to capture them.
44	"Final Mail"; Transliteration: "Saigo no Mēru" (Japanese: 最後のメール)	Hidenori Ishida	December 7, 2003
Yuji and Takumi manage to escape. Osada tells Keitaro she left because she didn't want to be a burden to him and the others. He hugs her and tells her he thinks that humans and Orphenochs should live together and be happy. Takumi and Yuji continue to disagree about humans and Orphenochs being able to live together. During the fight with Bat Orphenoch, Yuka is ultimately wounded by him and killed by Saeko.
45	"King's Awakening"; Transliteration: "Ō no Mezame" (Japanese: 王の目覚め)	Ryuta Tasaki	December 14, 2003
After Yuka's death, a devastated Keitaro Cries and mourn Yuka. And Yuji saw Yuka dead and think the Orphnoch killed her. Takumi talks with Keitaro and Mari about Yuka. Then an King Showed up and kill the man in rage. During a fight with the Bat Orphnoch, Faiz assumed his accel form and defeated the Bat Orphnoch, then Yuji changes into Horse Orphnoch and kills the police in a berserk rage and takes the throne of the President.
46	"A New President Appears"; Transliteration: "Shin Shachō Tōjō" (Japanese: 新社長登場)	Ryuta Tasaki	December 21, 2003
Yuji picked up as president as everyone's shock. the Coral Orphnoch is a monster in this episode. Tereuo is confronted by Coral Orphnoch who kills the man using his stab attack before escapes from Tereuo's Orphnoch state. Tereuo's Frightened that he is an Orphnoch's King. Next day with the Coral Orphnoch about to attacks Tereuo again in rage, he is defeated by teamwork of Takumi sa Faiz's Grand impact and Shuji as Delta's Lucifier Hammer. Later Takumi, Masato, and Shuji confronts Murakami.
47	"King's Appearance"; Transliteration: "Ō no Shutsugen" (Japanese: 王の出現)	Takao Nagaishi	December 28, 2003
After mortally wounded by Faiz, Kaixa, and Delta's Smash attacks, his life offered to Tereuo as the new Leader of the Orphnoches. Masato is shock at the belt's side effect as Takumi fix him. Riotroopers is a Monster in this episode as Naoya transform as Riotrooper.
48	"Masato, Dying A Glorious Death"; Transliteration: "Masato, Sange" (Japanese: 雅人、散華)	Takao Nagaishi	January 4, 2004
After take a fight with Riotrooper with Masato's Disease that Masato will die soon, Masato confronts Yuji that he will fight with Orphnoch King. Mari talks briefly with Rina before get kidnapped, once again to lure Masato. Hanagata dies from his rapid evolution. As Masato confronts Yuji that he Joined Smart Brain. Takumi, Naoya, and Shuji kill all Riotroopers using Faiz Gear Accel, Snake Orphnoch Form, and Delta gear. With Masato is killed by Yuji and Mari finds Masato where is he, but he dies.
49	"A Sign of Destruction"; Transliteration: "Horobiyuku Shu" (Japanese: 滅びゆく種)	Ryuta Tasaki	January 11, 2004
Takumi, Naoya, and Shuji finds Masato dead, and the gang was devastated. Rina becomes devastated after hear the news Masato is dead. Takumi confronts Yuji how heartless he is. As Takumi tell the news Masato died, he finds Mari who was saddened hear the news. As the gang fights Kitazaki assumed his Orphnoch form to avenge Masato's death. Kitazaki is dying as a result fight Faiz and Delta. Kitazaki get hit by Itsuro using his Orphnoch form before Kitazaki is executed by Arch Orphnoch, who eats his Face and become King. Takumi transforms into Faiz and tries to kill Teruo upon learning the boy's true identity as the Orphnoch King but Yuji intervernes it and change into Kamen Rider Kaixa.
50 (Final)	"My Dream"; Transliteration: "Ore no Yume" (Japanese: 俺の夢)	Ryuta Tasaki	January 18, 2004
After Yuji changes into Kaixa hit Takumi as Faiz hard, Takumi faint at Yuji's side. As Takumi replaced into Smart Brain and turned into an orphnoch easily. Keitaro and Mari saves Takumi and Takumi and Yuji Changed into Faiz and Kaixa, fighting each other. As they Assumed into Orphnoch before Takumi changes into Kamen Rider Faiz Blaster Mode each more. Yuji became angry at Takumi because Takumi spared him. The Arch Orphnoch Attacks Delta until Takumi and Yuji arrives, and Faiz Blaster destroys Horse Orphnoch and Arch Orphnoch with Saeko becomes no longer human and Itsuro starts a normal life as Orphnoch were disbanded soon after. The End.
