= Girl's Blood =

- Poster
- Directed by: Koichi Sakamoto
- Screenplay by: Takehiko Minato
- Based on: Aka x Pink by Kazuki Sakuraba
- Produced by: Hidehisa Chiwata; Jungo Maruta; Ujikatsu Omori
- Starring: Yuria Haga; Asami Tada; Ayame Misaki; Rina Koike
- Cinematography: Shu G. Momose
- Edited by: Hiroshi Sunaga
- Music by: Yasuhiro Mizawa
- Production companies: The Fool; Pony Canyon; Kadokawa Daiei Studio; W Field
- Distributed by: Kadokawa Corporation
- Release date: February 22, 2014 (Japan)
- Running time: 118 minutes
- Country: Japan
- Language: Japanese

Girl's Blood (赤×ピンク, Aka x Pinku) is a 2014 Japanese erotic action film directed by Koichi Sakamoto and written by Takehiko Minato, based on the novel Aka × Pink by Kazuki Sakuraba and distributed by Kadokawa. It was released on 22 February 2014.

== Story ==
Four girls take part in the illegal underground fighting event "Girl's Blood" held at an abandoned school in Tokyo's Roppongi district each night. The girls each have their own quirks and stories. Satsuki (Yuria Haga) struggles with gender dysphoria, Chinatsu (Asami Tada) ran away from an abusive husband, Miko (Ayame Misaki) is an S&M queen and Mayu (Rina Koike) has a Lolita face.

== Cast ==
- Yuria Haga as Satsuki
- Asami Tada as Chinatsu
- Ayame Misaki as Miko
- Rina Koike as Mayu
- Misaki Momose as Momomi
- Hideo Sakaki as Ranmaru Ando

== Reception ==
Patryk Czekaj, in a review on Twitch Film, called the film a "especially entertaining and laugh-inducing" guilty pleasure.
