= Asami Tada =

Japanese gravure idol

- 多田 あさみ
- Born: September 29, 1988 (age 37); Yokohama, Kanagawa Prefecture, Japan
- Occupations: Gravure idol; actress

Asami Tada (多田 あさみ, Tada Asami; born September 29, 1988, in Yokohama, Kanagawa Prefecture, Japan) is a Japanese gravure idol who is affiliated with Asche. On July 13, 2009, she won the "Second Annual Meeting of the Japanese Idol Award" of Zakzak. She had working on producing industries, such as DVDs parallel to gravure and acting.

== Filmography ==
=== Films ===
Year	Title	Role	Other notes
2014	Girl's Blood	Chinatsu	
