= Masayuki Izumi =

Japanese actor (1980–2015)

- 泉 政行
- Born: 12 May 1980; Arakawa, Tokyo, Japan
- Died: 28 July 2015 (aged 35); Tokyo, Japan
- Education: Tokai University
- Occupation: Actor
- Years active: 1998–2015
- Television: Kamen Rider 555 (2003–04); Kasōken no Onna series (2004–11)
- Height: 171 cm (5 ft 7 in)

Masayuki Izumi (泉 政行, Izumi Masayuki; 12 May 1980 – 28 July 2015) was a Japanese actor from Arakawa, Tokyo. He graduated from Komagome Senior High School and Tokai University Second Faculty of Engineering. He was represented with Gift.

== Death ==
Izumi died on the afternoon of 28 July 2015 at the age of 35. He had been under medical care for an unspecified illness.

== Filmography ==
=== Television ===
Year	Title	Role	Network	Ref.
2002	Gokusen	Masayuki Ouchi	NTV	
2002	Cosmo Angel	Obita Kohi	THK	
2003	Tengoku no Daisuke e: Hakone Ekiden ga Musunda Kizuna	Matsumoto	NTV	
2003	Kamen Rider 555	Yuji Kiba	TV Asahi	
2003	P&G Pantene Drama Special: Egao Therapy	Shingo Tsukishima	Fuji TV	
2004	Kasōken no Onna	Kenji Inui	TV Asahi	
2005	Fuyu no Rinbu	Sumio Omaru	THK	
2006	Itsuwari no Hanazono	Jiyunihchi Iwai	THK	
2006	Akihabara@Deep	Konosuke Shimoyanagi	TBS	
2006	Otorisōsa-kan Shiho Kitami	Katori	TV Asahi	
2006	Kinyō Entertainment: Odoru! Oyabun Tantei	Jun Haruyama	Fuji TV	
2007	Kekkonshiki e Ikō!	Yuichi Sugiyama	TBS	
2007	Liar Game	Kenya Okano	Fuji TV	
2007	Mop Girl	Hiroki Emoto	TV Asahi	
2008	Salaryman Kintarō	Hiroshi Kimura	TV Asahi	
2009	Kīna: Fukanō Hanzai Sōsa-kan	Hiroki Makino	NTV	
2009	Gekai Hatomura Shugoro	Hideaki Iwata	Fuji TV	
2010	Kekkon 3: Keikaken Aiko Yukawa no Kantei File		TBS	
2011	Dr. Ichiro Irabu	Naoto Omori	TV Asahi	

=== Films ===
Year	Title	Role	Ref.
2003	Kamen Rider 555: Paradise Lost	Yuji Kiba / Horse Orphnoch / Kamen Rider Orga	
2004	Kamen Rider Blade: Missing Ace	Baba	
2004	Sarutobi Sasuke: Yami no Gundan: Ji no Maki	Tsubasa	
2004	Sarutobi Sasuke: Yami no Gundan 2: Ten no Maki	Tsubasa	
2005	Sarutobi Sasuke: Yami no Gundan 3: Kaze no Maki	Tsubasa	
2005	Sarutobi Sasuke: Yami no Gundan 4: Hi no Maki: Kanketsu-hen	Tsubasa	
2005	Tenshi ga Orita Hi		
	Shibuya Kaidan: Sacchan no Toshi Densetsu: Tobira	Hiroki	
2006	Rozario no Shizuku	Yoshito Kimoto	
2006	Shibuya Kaidan: The Real Toshi Densetsu Kowai Gōkon	Yuhei	
2007	Life	Yoshio Mukai	
2007	Saiban-in: Eraba re, soshite Miete kita mono	Takuya Aoi	
2009	Gokusen: The Movie	Masayuko Ouchi	
2009	Nuke Shinobu	Tsukasa Kama	
2014	Greatful Dead	Michihiko Yanagi	

=== Stage ===
Year	Title	Role
2012	Visual Boy 10 Shūnenkinen Event Shakespeare-Rōdoku Performance "Basebaaall Hamlet!"	Romeo
2012	Rōdoku Geki "Shippo no naka ma-tachi"	
	Gakuya	

=== Video games ===
Year	Title	Role
2003	Kamen Rider 555	Horse Orphnoch

== Works ==
=== Photo albums ===
Year	Title	ISBN
2003	Kamen Rider 555: Faiz Shot!!	ISBN 4872791355
2004	Kare no iru Fūkei	ISBN 4257036893

=== DVD ===
Year	Title	Role
2003	Kamen Rider 555: Hyper Battle Video	Yuji Kiba
2004	Ikemen Shinsengu	Soshi Okita
	Green Flash	

=== CD ===
Title
Kamen Rider 555 Photo Book CD 5 Yuji Kiba
