= Mitsuru Karahashi =

Japanese actor

- 唐橋 充
- Born: May 30, 1977 (age 49); Fukushima, Japan
- Occupations: Actor, Illustrator
- Years active: 2003–present
- Spouse: Miki Mizuno (m. 2016)
- Children: 1

Mitsuru Karahashi (唐橋 充, Karahashi Mitsuru; born May 30, 1977) is a Japanese actor and illustrator. He is known for having roles in various tokusatsu series, most notably as Naoya Kaido in Kamen Rider 555 and Juzo Fuwa in Samurai Sentai Shinkenger.

== Filmography ==
=== Film ===
Year	Title	Role	Notes
2003	Kamen Rider 555: Paradise Lost	Naoya Kaido/Snake Orphnoch	
2004	Kamen Rider Blade: Missing Ace	Department Store Security Guard	
2005	Nibanme no kanojo	Scenarist	
2009	Kamen Rider G	Shade Member	
2009	Samurai Sentai Shinkenger The Movie: The Fateful War	Juzo Fuwa	
2010	Samurai Sentai Shinkenger vs. Go-onger: GinmakuBang!!	Juzo Fuwa	
2011	Kamen Rider OOO Wonderful: The Shogun and the 21 Core Medals	Rocker	
2014	Kamen Rider Gaim: Great Soccer Battle! Golden Fruits Cup!		
2016	Kamen Rider Ghost: The 100 Eyecons and Ghost's Fated Moment	Miyamoto Musashi	
2018	Uchu Sentai Kyuranger vs. Space Squad	Juzu Fuwa	
2021	Saber + Zenkaiger: Super Hero Senki	Hayato Fukamiya	
2021	TV Theater Success Mansion	Nagiri	
2022	Shikkokuten		

=== TV series ===
Year	Title	Role	Notes
2003-2004	Kamen Rider 555	Naoya Kaido/Snake Orphnoch	
2005	Sh15uya	Ootomo	
2005	Dragon Zakura	Yasushi Sawamatsu	
2005	Pink no Idenshi	Masaya Fujiki	
2006	Lion Maru G	Makage/Kagemaru	
2006	The Woman Prosecutor of Kyôto	Naoya Fujisawa	Episode 7
2007	Ultraseven X	Takao	Episode 6
2008-2009	Ultra Galaxy Mega Monster Battle: Never Ending Odyssey	Grande	
2009-2010	Samurai Sentai Shinkenger	Juzo Fuwa	
2015	Kamen Rider 4	Naoya Kaido	
2016	Kamen Rider Ghost	Miyamoto Musashi	Episode 46
2017	Seven Detectives	Seiya Kusunoki	Episode 6
2019	Detective Zero	Koji Aramaki	Episode 8
2019	Miss Accident Investigation	Kushiro	Episode 3
2020	Tario	Tomonari Hasebe	Episode 3
2020-2021	Kamen Rider Saber	Hayato Fukamiya	
2021	TV Theater Success Mansion	Nagiri	
2023	Ultraman Blazar	Zangill	Episode 17
2024	Ultraman Arc	Zangill	Episodes 16 and 17
2025	Masked Ninja Akakage	Kurobei the Black Bat	
