= Katsuyuki Murai =

Japanese actor

Katsuyuki Murai (村井 克行, Murai Katsuyuki) (born December 17, 1969) is a Japanese actor known for playing the Rose Orphnoch in Kamen Rider 555.

== Roles ==
- Kamen Rider 555 as Kyoji Murakami/Rose Orphnoch
- Kamen Rider 555: Paradise Lost as Kyoji Murakami
- Kamen Rider Blade: Missing Ace as Hanada
- Garo as Yūji Mitsuki
- Kamen Rider Kiva as Takeo Ōmura/Frog Fangire
