= Kento Handa =

Japanese actor and singer

- 半田 健人
- Born: June 4, 1984 (age 42); Kobe, Hyōgo, Japan
- Occupations: Actor, singer
- Years active: 2002-present
- Height: 177 cm (5 ft 10 in)

Kento Handa (半田 健人, Handa Kento; born June 4, 1984 in Kobe, Hyōgo, Japan, and raised in Ashiya) is a Japanese actor and singer, best known for his role as Takumi Inui/Kamen Rider Faiz in Kamen Rider 555. He plays many musical instruments including the guitar, bass, drums and the piano. His album "HOMEMADE" was released in 2017, and his album Seikatsu (生活, "Life") was released in 2018.

== Filmography ==
=== Anime ===
- Prayers (2005; OVA) – Tasuku

=== Drama ===
- Kamen Rider 555 (2003 - 2004) – Kamen Rider Faiz / Takumi Inui
- Hana Yori Dango (2005) – Seto Mamoru (episode 5)
- Engine Sentai Go-onger (2008; tokusatsu)– Retsutaka (guest)
- Kamen Rider Zi-O (2018) – Kamen Rider Faiz / Takumi Inui

=== Film ===
- Kamen Rider 555: Paradise Lost (2003) – Takumi Inui / Kamen Rider Faiz / Wolf Orphnoch
- Drift 3: TAKA (2006) – Takao
- Drift 4: HAYABUSA (2007) – Takao
- Engine Sentai Go-onger: Boom Boom! Bang Bang! GekijōBang!! (2008) – Retsutaka
- Heisei Riders vs. Shōwa Riders: Kamen Rider Taisen feat. Super Sentai (2014) – Takumi Inui / Kamen Rider Faiz, Riderman (Voice)
- Super Hero Taisen GP: Kamen Rider 3 (2015) – Takumi Inui / Kamen Rider Faiz
- d-Video Special: Kamen Rider 4 (2015) - Takumi Inui / Kamen Rider Faiz, Great Leader of SHOCKER
- Musashi (2019) - Nagaoka Okinaga
- Kamen Rider 555 20th: Paradise Regained (2024) - Takumi Inui / Kamen Rider Faiz
