= Yuria Haga =

Japanese model and actress (born 1987)

- Born: November 27, 1987 (age 38); Iwate
- Years active: 1998–present
- Height: 1.65 m (5 ft 5 in)
- Spouse: Kenta Kamakari (m. 2017)
- Children: 1
- Website: https://kirinpro.co.jp/cmspro/18947

Yuria Haga (芳賀 優里亜, Haga Yuria; born November 27, 1987 in Iwate) is a Japanese model and actress. She is best known for her role as Mari Sonoda in Kamen Rider 555.

== Filmography ==
=== TV series ===
- Doremisora (2002)
- Kokoro (2003)
- Kamen Rider 555 (2003) - Mari Sonada
- Shin: Inochi no genba kara (2004)
- Sh15uya (2005)
- Kamen Rider Kiva (2008) - Mio Suzuki/Pearlshell Fangire
- Kamen Rider Decade (2009) - Yuki (ep. 30)/Thorn Fangire (ep. 30)
- Kamen Rider Dragon Knight: Maya Young/Kamen Rider Siren Japanese Dub (2009)
- Oha Star
- Zero: Dragon Blood (2017)

=== Movies ===
- Dokomademo ikou (1999)
- Harmful Insect (2001)
- Kamen Rider 555: Paradise Lost (2003) - Mari Sonada
- Koi suru nichiyobi (Love on Sunday) (2006)
- Master of Thunder: Kessen!! Fûmaryûkoden (Summer 2006)
- End Call (2008)
- Girl's Blood (2014) - Satsuki
- Kamen Rider 555 20th: Paradise Regained (2024) - Mari Sonada/Wildcat Orphnoch

=== Theatre ===
- Fruits Basket (2022), Kyōko Honda
