= Kamen Rider 555 =

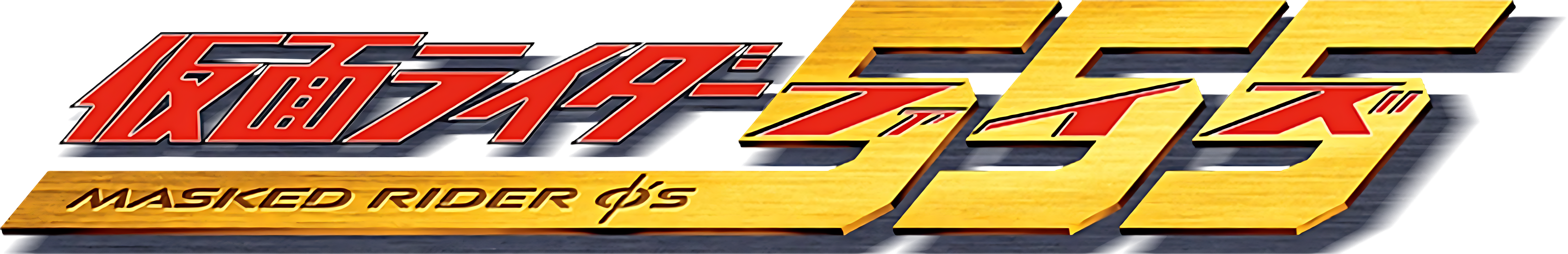
- Also known as: Masked Rider 555; Masked Rider Φ's; Kamen Rider Φ's
- Genre: Tokusatsu; Action; Cyberpunk; Drama; Science fiction; Thriller; Superhero fiction
- Created by: Shotaro Ishinomori
- Screenplay by: Toshiki Inoue
- Directed by: Ryuta Tasaki
- Starring: Kento Handa; Yuria Haga; Ken Mizorogi; Masayuki Izumi; Yoshika Kato; Mitsuru Karahashi; Kōhei Murakami; Atsushi Harada; Rie Kasai; Kengo Ohkuchi; Katsuyuki Murai; Hitomi Kurihara; Jun Yamasaki; Waka; Go Ayano; Ray Fujita
- Narrated by: Takehiko Kano
- Opening theme: "Justiφ's" by ISSA
- Composer: Hayato Matsuo
- Country of origin: Japan
- Original language: Japanese
- No. of episodes: 50 (List of episodes)

Production
- Producers: Chika Hamada (TV Asahi); Shinichiro Shirakura (Toei); Naomi Takebe (Toei); Takaaki Utsunomiya (Toei)
- Running time: 20–25 minutes
- Production companies: TV Asahi; Toei Company; Asatsu-DK

Original release
- Network: ANN (TV Asahi)
- Release: January 26, 2003 – January 18, 2004

Related
- Kamen Rider Ryuki; Kamen Rider Blade

Kamen Rider 555 (仮面ライダー555, Kamen Raidā Faizu) is a Japanese tokusatsu television drama. It is the 13th installment in the Kamen Rider Series. It is a joint collaboration between Ishimori Productions and Toei, and was broadcast on TV Asahi from January 26, 2003, to January 18, 2004. This series was the first to use TV Asahi's current logo. It aired as a part of TV Asahi's 2003 Super Hero Time block, alongside Bakuryū Sentai Abaranger. It is the first series marking the debut of technology, cybernetics, and greek letter motif.

== Story ==
The Smart Brain corporation, the world's most powerful corporation, is trying to take over the world using Orphnoch, the "next stage in humanity's evolution", to covertly kill off the human population. In pursuit of this, they develop three suits of power armor, called Rider Gears (each for Faiz, Kaixa, and Delta), to find and protect the Orphnoch King, who can fix a defect within Orphnoch DNA which causes their genetic structure to break down, leading to death.

The Rider Gears are stolen by Hanagata, the Goat Orphnoch and former chief of Smart Brain. He sends them to his foster children (dubbed the "Ryuseiji", after the school they attended) so they can stop the Orphnoch from achieving their goal. However, Rider Gears were designed to be worn by an Orphnoch, and humans are unable to activate the systems without undergoing genetic modification.

A young loner, Takumi Inui, is unwittingly drawn into the conflict between the Orphnoch and humans and becomes Kamen Rider Faiz to save the life of Mari Sonoda, one of the Ryuseiji. Smart Brain begins targeting him in an attempt to retrieve the Faiz Gear.

However, there is division amongst the Orphnoch, as those who wish to co-exist with humans rather than kill them, begin resisting the Smart Brain, who in turn targets them as well. Most of these "renegade" Orphnochs are either killed, remain neutral, or begin siding with the Ryuseiji against the Smart Brain.

When the Tokyo police discover the Orphnoch are behind a series of bizarre murders, they begin operations to defeat the creatures, largely unaware of the various factions involved. They even begin performing experiments on captured Orphnoch in an attempt to find ways of destroying them, though this does not go well.

The Orphnoch King eventually awakens within a young boy named Teruo Suzuki, whom Naoya Kaido and Keitaro Kikuchi saved and befriended. Now, it is up to the holders of the Rider Gears to band together and fight for humanity's survival.

== Production ==
The Kamen Rider 555 trademark was registered by Toei on October 29, 2002.

== Rider Gears ==
Rider Gears
Belt	Greek letter	Notable wearer
TV series
Faiz Gear	Φ	Takumi Inui
Kaixa Gear	Χ	Masato Kusaka
Delta Gear	Δ	Shuji Mihara
Riotrooper Gear	Ο	Naoya Kaido
Movie
Psyga Gear	Ψ	Leo
Orga Gear	Ω	Yuji Kiba
Muez Gear	μ	Rena Kurumi
Stage show
Alpha Gear	α	Female performer
Beta Gear	β	Male performer
Gamma Gear	γ	Male performer

The equipment used in the series to transform is referred to as Rider Gear. It was created to be worn by the Orphnoch to protect their Orphnoch King. Each Rider Gear contains a belt known as a Driver used to form armor that protects the wearer and amplifies their strengths and abilities. The armor's theme is based on a letter from the Greek alphabet, and contains the letter somehow within the aesthetic design. The Gears also have a method to input command codes, a cell phone number keypad for most, which can activate armor and various weapons. The sound effects of a dialing in any of the Rider Gear phones were later referenced in episode 17 of Kamen Rider Kabuto.

The TV series focused on three sets of Rider Gear: Faiz Gear, Kaixa Gear, and Delta Gear. During the TV series, Hanagata, the foster father of the Ryuseiji and former chief executive of Smart Brain, attempted to create several new Rider Gears, using two lost people to test out the first two. The two belts failed to create Rider armor, resulting in the wearer's deaths. When Itsuro Takuma of Lucky Clover wore the third one it disabled him for a few seconds before it dissolved. The fourth dissolved without ever being worn. The Kamen Rider 555 movie, Paradise Lost, introduced two additional sets of Rider Gear: Psyga Gear and Orga Gear.in the 20th anniversary sequel of faiz paradise regained and murde case smart brain created three belts next faiz gear next kaixa gear and muez gear and also created two android clones kitazaki and masato kusaka

=== Riotrooper army ===
The show featured a series of mass-produced transformation belts called Smart Buckle, which enabled the wearer to transform into a generic Riotrooper. The Riotroopers were introduced in the movie and later added at the end of the TV series.

=== Live stage-show ===
A live stage show of Kamen Rider Faiz featured three unique riders named Alpha, Beta, and Gamma.

=== Naming conventions ===
Each Rider Gear set is code-locked, in addition to being only usable by Orphnochs. These codes, input through the phone of each Gear, are a set of numbers that relate to the theme of each Gear. For the Faiz Gear, the code is 5-5-5, or "fives", phonetically similar to the word Faiz. For the Kaixa Gear, the code is 9-1-3, which is read in goroawase as "Ka-I-Sa". For the Delta Gear, though voice-activated, the code is 3-3-3, a reference to the Greek letter Delta, a triangle.

The goroawase system was also used for the Psyga Gear, where the code 3-1-5 is read as "Sa-I-Go". The Orga Gear, patterned after the Greek Omega, the final letter, is code-locked to 0-0-0.muez gear smartphone henshin app 6–6-6

== Episodes ==
No.	Title	Directed by	Original release date
1	"The Start of a Trip"; Transliteration: "Tabi no Hajimari" (Japanese: 旅の始まり)	Ryuta Tasaki	January 26, 2003
2	"The Belt's Power"; Transliteration: "Beruto no Chikara" (Japanese: ベルトの力)	Ryuta Tasaki	February 2, 2003
3	"The King's Sleep..."; Transliteration: "Ō no Nemuri..." (Japanese: 王の眠り･･･)	Takao Nagaishi	February 9, 2003
4	"My Name"; Transliteration: "Ore no Namae" (Japanese: おれの名前)	Takao Nagaishi	February 16, 2003
5	"Original"; Transliteration: "Orijinaru" (Japanese: オリジナル)	Hidenori Ishida	February 23, 2003
6	"Trio × Trio"; Transliteration: "Sannin × Sannin" (Japanese: ３人×３人)	Hidenori Ishida	March 2, 2003
7	"The Power of Dreams"; Transliteration: "Yume no Chikara" (Japanese: 夢の力)	Ryuta Tasaki	March 9, 2003
8	"The Protector of Dreams"; Transliteration: "Yume no Mamoribito" (Japanese: 夢の守り人)	Ryuta Tasaki	March 16, 2003
9	"Enter, the President"; Transliteration: "Shachō Tōjō" (Japanese: 社長登場)	Takao Nagaishi	March 23, 2003
10	"The Enigmatic Rider"; Transliteration: "Nazo no Raidā" (Japanese: 謎のライダー)	Takao Nagaishi	March 30, 2003
11	"The Enigmatic Belt"; Transliteration: "Nazo no Beruto" (Japanese: 謎のベルト)	Takao Nagaishi	April 6, 2003
12	"Ryūsei School"; Transliteration: "Ryūsei-juku" (Japanese: 流星塾)	Hidenori Ishida	April 13, 2003
13	"Friend of Foe?"; Transliteration: "Teki ka Mikata ka" (Japanese: 敵か味方か)	Hidenori Ishida	April 20, 2003
14	"Takumi's Spirit"; Transliteration: "Takumi no Iji" (Japanese: 巧の意地)	Ryuta Tasaki	April 27, 2003
15	"The Fallen Idol ~ φ's vs. χ" Transliteration: "Ochita Gūzō ~ Faizu Tai Kai" (Japanese: 落ちた偶像~ φ's vs χ)	Ryuta Tasaki	May 4, 2003
16	"Human Heart"; Transliteration: "Ningen no Kokoro" (Japanese: 人間の心)	Naoki Tamura	May 11, 2003
17	"Takumi, Revival"; Transliteration: "Takumi, Fukkatsu" (Japanese: 巧、復活)	Naoki Tamura	May 18, 2003
18	"Narrow Escape from Death"; Transliteration: "Kyūshi ni Isshō" (Japanese: 九死に一生)	Takao Nagaishi	May 25, 2003
19	"Pure White Justice"; Transliteration: "Junpaku no Seigi" (Japanese: 純白の正義)	Takao Nagaishi	June 1, 2003
20	"The Beautiful Assassin"; Transliteration: "Utsukushiki Shikaku" (Japanese: 美しき刺客)	Hidenori Ishida	June 8, 2003
21	"Accelerating Spirits"; Transliteration: "Kasoku Suru Tamashii" (Japanese: 加速する魂)	Hidenori Ishida	June 22, 2003
22	"Masato's Confession"; Transliteration: "Masato no Kokuhaku" (Japanese: 雅人の告白)	Naoki Tamura	June 29, 2003
23	"False Friendship"; Transliteration: "Itsuwari no Yūjō" (Japanese: 偽りの友情)	Naoki Tamura	July 6, 2003
24	"The Door to Darkness"; Transliteration: "Yami e no Tobira" (Japanese: 闇への扉)	Takao Nagaishi	July 13, 2003
25	"The Dark Laboratory"; Transliteration: "Yami no Jikkenshitsu" (Japanese: 闇の実験室)	Takao Nagaishi	July 20, 2003
26	"Enter, Delta"; Transliteration: "Deruta Tōjō" (Japanese: デルタ登場)	Hidenori Ishida	July 27, 2003
27	"Ryūsei School Breaks Up"; Transliteration: "Ryūseijuku Bunretsu" (Japanese: 流星塾分裂)	Hidenori Ishida	August 3, 2003
28	"Dark Clover"; Transliteration: "Ankoku no Yotsuba" (Japanese: 暗黒の四葉)	Hidenori Ishida	August 10, 2003
29	"Excellent Bike"; Transliteration: "Chōzetsu Baiku" (Japanese: 超絶バイク)	Naoki Tamura	August 17, 2003
30	"Masato's Trap"; Transliteration: "Masato no Wana" (Japanese: 雅人の罠)	Naoki Tamura	August 24, 2003
31	"Origami Tears"; Transliteration: "Origami no Namida" (Japanese: 折り紙の涙)	Nobuhiro Suzumura	August 31, 2003
32	"Intertwined Threads"; Transliteration: "Karamiau Ito" (Japanese: 絡み合う糸)	Nobuhiro Suzumura	September 7, 2003
33	"Mari Dies"; Transliteration: "Mari, Shisu" (Japanese: 真理、死す)	Takao Nagaishi	September 14, 2003
34	"True Form"; Transliteration: "Shinjitsu no Sugata" (Japanese: 真実の姿)	Takao Nagaishi	September 21, 2003
35	"The Resurrection Riddle"; Transliteration: "Fukkatsu no Nazo" (Japanese: 復活の謎)	Hidenori Ishida	September 28, 2003
36	"Restored Memories"; Transliteration: "Yomigaeru Kioku" (Japanese: 蘇る記憶)	Hidenori Ishida	October 5, 2003
37	"Kaixa's Justice"; Transliteration: "Kaiza no Seigi" (Japanese: カイザの正義)	Nobuhiro Suzumura	October 12, 2003
38	"The Wandering Spirit"; Transliteration: "Samayoeru Tamashii" (Japanese: 彷徨える魂)	Nobuhiro Suzumura	October 19, 2003
39	"Faiz 2"; Transliteration: "Faizu Tsū" (Japanese: ファイズ２)	Naoki Tamura	October 26, 2003
40	"Proof of Humanity"; Transliteration: "Ningen no Akashi" (Japanese: 人間の証)	Naoki Tamura	November 9, 2003
41	"Capture Commences"; Transliteration: "Hokaku Kaishi" (Japanese: 捕獲開始)	Takao Nagaishi	November 16, 2003
42	"Broken Wings"; Transliteration: "Oreta Tsubasa" (Japanese: 折れた翼)	Takao Nagaishi	November 23, 2003
43	"Red Balloon"; Transliteration: "Akai Fūsen" (Japanese: 赤い風船)	Hidenori Ishida	November 30, 2003
44	"Final Mail"; Transliteration: "Saigo no Mēru" (Japanese: 最後のメール)	Hidenori Ishida	December 7, 2003
45	"King's Awakening"; Transliteration: "Ō no Mezame" (Japanese: 王の目覚め)	Ryuta Tasaki	December 14, 2003
46	"A New President Appears"; Transliteration: "Shin Shachō Tōjō" (Japanese: 新社長登場)	Ryuta Tasaki	December 21, 2003
47	"King's Appearance"; Transliteration: "Ō no Shutsugen" (Japanese: 王の出現)	Takao Nagaishi	December 28, 2003
48	"Masato, Dying A Glorious Death"; Transliteration: "Masato, Sange" (Japanese: 雅人、散華)	Takao Nagaishi	January 4, 2004
49	"A Sign of Destruction"; Transliteration: "Horobiyuku Shu" (Japanese: 滅びゆく種)	Ryuta Tasaki	January 11, 2004
50 (Final)	"My Dream"; Transliteration: "Ore no Yume" (Japanese: 俺の夢)	Ryuta Tasaki	January 18, 2004

== Films ==
=== Paradise Lost ===
Kamen Rider 555 the Movie: Paradise Lost (劇場版 仮面ライダー555 パラダイス・ロスト, Gekijōban Kamen Raidā Faizu Paradaisu Rosuto), was released during the run of the series, as a double feature alongside Bakuryū Sentai Abaranger Deluxe: Abare Summer Is Freezing Cold! on August 16, 2003. The film was 81 minutes long. A few new characters and Rider Gears were introduced in the film.

=== Paradise Regained ===
Kamen Rider 555 20th: Paradise Regained (仮面ライダー555 20th パラダイス・リゲインド, Kamen Raidā Faizu Nijusshūnen : Paradaisu Rigeindo, Masked Rider Φ's: Paradise Regained) is a Japanese superhero Tokusatsu V-Cinext film serving to commemorate the 20th anniversary of Kamen Rider 555.

=== Kamen Rider Taisen ===
A trailer for Heisei Rider vs. Shōwa Rider: Kamen Rider Taisen feat. Super Sentai (平成ライダー対昭和ライダー 仮面ライダー大戦 feat.スーパー戦隊, Heisei Raidā Tai Shōwa Raidā Kamen Raidā Taisen Fīcharingu Sūpā Sentai) was shown in theaters with The Fateful Sengoku Movie Battle. The film's website reveals that it would be released in Japanese theaters on March 29, 2014. Kohei Murakami and Kento Handa were confirmed to reprise their respective roles from Kamen Rider 555.

=== Super Hero Taisen GP ===
Super Hero Taisen GP: Kamen Rider 3 (スーパーヒーロー大戦GP 仮面ライダー3号, Supā Hīrō Taisen Guranpuri Kamen Raidā Sangō) is the 2015 entry of the "Super Hero Taisen" film series, featuring the cast of Kamen Rider Drive and the appearance of Kamen Rider 3, which was originally created by Shotaro Ishinomori for the one-shot 1972 manga Rider #3 VS. General Black (3ごうライダーたい ブラックしょうぐんのまき, Sangō Raidā Tai Burakku Shōgun no Maki). Kento Handa reprises his role in the film, which was scheduled to open in theaters on March 21, 2015, and its sequel Kamen Rider 4 (仮面ライダー4号, Kamen Raidā Yongō), which has Mitsuru Karahashi reprising his role. In Kamen Rider 4, it reveals the truth after the end of Kamen Rider 555 TV series, especially on Takumi himself.

== Web-exclusive series ==
- Kamen Rider Genms: Smart Brain and the 1000% Crisis (仮面ライダーゲンムズ スマートブレインと1000%のクライシス, Kamen Raidā Genmuzu Sumāto Burein to Sen-pāsento no Kuraishisu): The second entry of the web-exclusive Kamen Rider Genms series released on Toei Tokusatsu Fan Club on April 17, 2022, and serves a crossover between Kamen Rider Ex-Aid, Kamen Rider Zero-One, and 555.
- Kamen Rider Outsiders (仮面ライダーアウトサイダーズ, Kamen Raidā Autosaidāzu): A web-exclusive crossover series of Toei Tokusatsu Fan Club between various characters from the Kamen Rider metaseries released on October 16, 2022, which is a direct sequel to Kamen Rider Genms.
- Kamen Rider 555 Murder Case (仮面ライダー555殺人事件, Kamen Raidā Faizu Satsujin Jiken): A two-episode web-exclusive special released on Toei Tokusatsu YouTube Official (only the first episode) and Toei Tokusatsu Fan Club on January 28, 2024. The events of the web-exclusive special are not connected to Kamen Rider 555 20th: Paradise Regained.

== V-Cinema ==
Kamen Rider 555 20th: Paradise Regained (仮面ライダー555 20th パラダイス・リゲインド, Kamen Raidā Faizu Nijusshū'nen Paradaisu Rigeindo) is a V-Cinema release which received a limited theatrical release on February 2, 2024, followed by its DVD and Blu-ray release on May 29, 2024. The events of the V-Cinema take place twenty years after the TV series. The V-Cinema is written by Toshiki Inoue and directed by Ryuta Tasaki. The theme song is "Identiφ's" performed by ISSA.

== Novels ==
- Kamen Rider Faiz Seiden: Deformed Flowers (仮面ライダーファイズ 正伝 —異形の花々—, Kamen Raidā Faizu Seiden Igyō no Hanabana; "Kamen Rider Faiz True Story: Deformed Flowers"), written by Toshiki Inoue, is a novel adaptation. The novel was released on August 17, 2004.
- Novel: Kamen Rider Faiz (小説 仮面ライダーファイズ, Shōsetsu Kamen Raidā Faizu), written by Toshiki Inoue, is part of a series of spin-off novel adaptions of the Heisei Era Kamen Riders. It is a reprint of Deformed Flowers, which added a five-year epilogue to the story. The novel was released on January 31, 2013.

== Lost World ==
The S.I.C. Hero Saga side story for 555 published in Monthly Hobby Japan magazine was titled Masked Rider 555: Lost World (MASKED RIDER 555 -ロスト・ワールド-, Kamen Raidā Faizu -Rosuto Wārudo-). It serves as a prologue to the alternate story that was 555: Paradise Lost, and features the new character Riotrooper Ver. 2 (ライオトルーパーver.2, Raiotorūpā Bājon Tsū). The story ran from October 2005 to January 2006.

Chapter titles

1. Faiz (ファイズ, Faizu)
2. Kaixa (カイザ, Kaiza)
3. Delta (デルタ, Deruta)
4. Psyga (サイガ, Saiga)

== Video game ==
A video game based on the series was produced by Bandai for the PlayStation 2. It was a fighting game that featured many of the characters from the TV series. There were several modes of gameplay for either a single play or two players. It was released only in Japan near the end of the TV series on December 18, 2003.

== Blu-ray release ==
In 2014, 555 received a three-part Blu-ray release. To promote the release, the cast reunited after 10 years, but they remarked that not much has changed, other than Yoshika Kato changing her stage name to Leilani Gaja and her new life in Hong Kong and series lead Kento Handa's recent popularity on the variety show Tamori Club where he has surprised guests with his knowledge of high-rise buildings and kayōkyoku.

== Cast ==
- Takumi Inui (乾 巧, Inui Takumi): Kento Handa (半田 健人, Handa Kento)
- Mari Sonoda (園田 真理, Sonoda Mari): Yuria Haga (芳賀 優里亜, Haga Yuria)
- Keitaro Kikuchi (菊池 啓太郎, Kikuchi Keitarō): Ken Mizorogi (溝呂木 賢, Mizorogi Ken)
- Yuji Kiba (木場 勇治, Kiba Yūji): Masayuki Izumi (泉 政行, Izumi Masayuki)
- Yuka Osada (長田 結花, Osada Yuka): Yoshika Kato (加藤 美佳, Katō Yoshika)
- Naoya Kaido (海堂 直也, Kaidō Naoya): Mitsuru Karahashi (唐橋 充, Karahashi Mitsuru)
- Masato Kusaka (草加 雅人, Kusaka Masato): Kōhei Murakami (村上 幸平, Murakami Kōhei)
- Shuji Mihara (三原 修二, Mihara Shūji): Atsushi Harada (原田 篤, Harada Atsushi)
- Rina Abe (阿部 里奈, Abe Rina): Rie Kasai (河西 りえ, Kasai Rie)
- Kazufumi Mizuno (水野 和史, Mizuno Kazufumi): Kengo Ohkuchi (大口 兼悟, Ohkuchi Kengo)
- Aki Sawada (澤田 亜希, Sawada Aki): Go Ayano (綾野 剛, Ayano Gō)
- Teruo Suzuki (鈴木 照夫, Suzuki Teruo): Kayato Watanabe (渡辺 彼野人, Watanabe Kayato)
- Joji Soeno (添野 錠二, Soeno Jōji): Taro Ishida (石田 太郎, Ishida Tarō)
- Sawamura (沢村): Koji Iwakawa (岩川 幸司, Iwakawa Kōji)
- Hikaru Soeno (添野 ひかる, Soeno Hikaru): Manami Miwake (三訳 真奈美, Miwake Manami)
- Masahiko Minami (南 雅彦, Minami Masahiko): Atsushi Ogawa (小川 敦史, Ogawa Atsushi)
- J (ジェイ, Jei): Kenneth Duria (ケネス・ヅリア, Kenesu Zuria)
- Itsuro Takuma (琢磨 逸郎, Takuma Itsurō): Jun Yamasaki (山崎 潤, Yamasaki Jun)
- Saeko Kageyama (影山 冴子, Kageyama Saeko): Waka (和香)
- Kitazaki (北崎): Ray Fujita (藤田 玲, Fujita Rei)
- Smart Lady (スマートレディ, Sumāto Redi): Hitomi Kurihara (栗原 瞳, Kurihara Hitomi)
- Kyoji Murakami (村上 峡児, Murakami Kyōji): Katsuyuki Murai (村井 克行, Murai Katsuyuki)
- Hanagata (花形): Koji Naka (中 康治, Naka Kōji)

=== Voice cast ===
- Arch Orphnoch (アークオルフェノク, Āku Orufenoku): Hiroshi Yanaka (家中 宏, Yanaka Hiroshi)
- Rider Gears (ライダーギア, Raidā Gia), Narrator: Takehiko Kano (假野 剛彦, Kano Takehiko)

=== Guest cast ===
- Chie Morishita (森下 千恵, Morishita Chie; 1–2): Mika Katsumura (勝村 美香, Katsumura Mika)
- Yuji Kiba's father (1): Shinichi Kase (加瀬 慎一, Kase Shin'ichi)
- Yuji Kiba's mother (1): Midori Takei (竹井 みどり, Takei Midori)
- Akai (赤井; 3–4): Katsuyuki Yamazaki (山﨑 勝之, Yamazaki Katsuyuki)
- Eiichi Toda (戸田 英一, Toda Eiichi; 5–6): Shigeki Kagemaru (影丸 茂樹, Kagemaru Shigeki)
- Professor (7–8): Ichiro Ogura (小倉 一郎, Ogura Ichirō)
- Shigehisa Aoki (青木 茂久, Aoki Shigehisa; 20–21): Sarutoki Minagawa (皆川 猿時, Minagawa Sarutoki)
- Gorgeous man (31–32): Masaki Tachi (舘 正貴, Tachi Masaki)
- Crab Orphnoch (クラブオルフェノク, Kurabu Orufenoku; Voice; 41–42): Satoshi Matsuda (松田 悟志, Matsuda Satoshi)

== International Broadcasts ==
- In the Philippines, it was aired on GMA Network from 2005 to 2006 and re-aired on Hero TV from 2005 to 2006 with Tagalog dub as Masked Rider 555 or Masked Rider Faiz.
- From 2005 to 2006, the series was dubbed in English and aired in Singapore on MediaCorp Kids Central as Masked Rider 555.
- From October 29, 2005- November 4, 2006, 555 aired in Hong Kong on TVB as Masked Rider 555 (幪面超人555, Méng Miàn Chāorén 555) dubbed in Cantonese.
- From September 18, 2005- August 27, 2006, 555 aired in Taiwan on YoYo TV as Masked Rider 555 (假面騎士555, Jiǎ Miàn Qíshì 555) with a Taiwanese Mandarin dub.
- On April 24, 2021, 555, alongside Agito and Ryuki, aired on FreeTV, with a Spanish dub in Latin America.
