= Leilani Gaja =

Japanese model and actress

Leilani Yoshika Gaja (我謝 美佳 レイラニ, Gaja Yoshika Reirani; born February 12, 1985) is a Japanese model and actress from Tokyo. Her stage name in Japan is Yoshika Katou (加藤 美佳, Katō Yoshika), and is used in nearly all of her appearances in drama and film. Her father is Taiwanese of Japanese descent and her mother is Hawaiian of Japanese descent, lending to her legal name Leilani (Hawaiian for 'heavenly lei'), and making her half-Japanese. Her first major role was as Yuka Osada, the Crane Orphnoch, in Kamen Rider 555.
