= Kamen Rider Revice =

Japanese television drama

- Genre: Tokusatsu; Superhero fiction; Supernatural fiction; Crossover fiction; Adventure; Comedy-Drama; Neo-western; Dark fantasy
- Created by: Shotaro Ishinomori
- Written by: Hanta Kinoshita
- Directed by: Takayuki Shibasaki
- Starring: Kentaro Maeda; Wataru Hyuga; Ayaka Imoto; Noritaka Hamao; Yui Asakura; Hayata Seki; Kurodo Hachijoin; Junya Komatsu; Tomoya Oku; Kazuya Tanabe; Jun Hashimoto; Kurara Emi; Shigeyuki Totsugi
- Voices of: Subaru Kimura; Kenjiro Tsuda; Miku Itō; Shinshu Fuji; Kazuhiko Inoue
- Opening theme: "liveDevil" by Da-ice feat. Subaru Kimura
- Composer: Kōtarō Nakagawa
- Country of origin: Japan
- Original language: Japanese
- No. of episodes: 50 (list of episodes)

Production
- Producers: Chihiro Inoue (TV Asahi); Kei Mizutani (TV Asahi); Taku Mochizuki (Toei)
- Running time: 25 minutes
- Production companies: TV Asahi; Toei Company; ADK Emotions

Original release
- Network: ANN (TV Asahi)
- Release: September 5, 2021 – August 28, 2022

Related
- Kamen Rider Saber; Kamen Rider Geats

Kamen Rider Revice (仮面ライダーリバイス, Kamen Raidā Ribaisu) is a Japanese tokusatsu drama and the 32nd entry of Toei Company's Kamen Rider metaseries. It is the third series to debut during the Reiwa period and commemorates the 50th anniversary of the franchise. The series premiered on September 5, 2021, joining Kikai Sentai Zenkaiger and later, Avataro Sentai Donbrothers in the Super Hero Time line-up following Kamen Rider Saber's finale. The series concluded on August 18, 2022, and was succeeded by Kamen Rider Geats.

The series revolves around animals/dinosaurs/insects/birds/prehistoric creatures and demons. It also centered on the theme of deal with the devil, first introduced by Johann Wolfgang von Goethe in Faust, as well as motifs of genetic memory.

== Premise ==
In 1971, a military organization called NOAH led an expedition in Latin America and discovered the remains of the first devil Giff and an artifact from which they developed Vistamps. In the present, Giff's remains are in the possession of a NOAH splinter faction called Deadmans, a devil-worshiping cult who seeks to resurrect him by using Proto Vistamps to convert peoples' inner demons to their fold. Opposing Deadmans is an organization called Fenix, which has developed the Revice Driver for someone who has tamed their inner demon. Ikki Igarashi, who runs a sentō with his family, ends up acquiring the belt while forming a pact with his inner demon, Vice, to fight Deadmans together as Kamen Riders Revi and Vice.

Ikki's younger brother Daiji, a Fenix operative who was intended to become Revice but failed to out of fear, begins to avoid Ikki until he is possessed by his inner demon, Kagero, who obtains the means to transform into Kamen Rider Evil to defeat Ikki, who helps Daiji overcome Kagero's control and become Kamen Rider Live. Later, Ikki and Daiji's younger sister, Sakura, joins the fray after obtaining the means to become Kamen Rider Jeanne and awakening her inner demon, Lovekov, from the secret resistance group Weekend.

== Episodes ==
No.	Title	Directed by	Written by	Original release date
1	"Family! Contract! The Devil Whispers!"; Transliteration: "Kazoku! Keiyaku! Akuma Sasayaku!" (Japanese: 家族！契約！悪魔ささやく！)	Takayuki Shibasaki	Hanta Kinoshita	September 5, 2021
2	"The Devil Is Just a Bad Guy!?"; Transliteration: "Akuma wa Akumade Warui Yatsu!?" (Japanese: 悪魔はあくまで悪いやつ!?)	Takayuki Shibasaki	Hanta Kinoshita	September 12, 2021
3	"Hostage Trouble, What Will the Brothers Do!?"; Transliteration: "Hitojichi Toraburu, Dō Suru Kyōdai!?" (Japanese: 人質トラブル、どうする兄弟！？)	Teruaki Sugihara	Hanta Kinoshita	September 19, 2021
4	"Not Enough Love! A Dangerous Devil Is Born!"; Transliteration: "Tarinai Aijō! Abunai Akuma Tanjō!" (Japanese: 足りない愛情！アブナイ悪魔誕生！)	Teruaki Sugihara	Hanta Kinoshita	September 26, 2021
5	"The World-Reforming Rider! Who Is the Traitor!?"; Transliteration: "Yonaoshi Raidā! Uragirimono wa Dare da!?" (Japanese: 世直しライダー！裏切り者は誰だ！？)	Kazuya Kamihoriuchi	Hanta Kinoshita	October 3, 2021
6	"Evil's True Identity! A Shocking Showtime!?"; Transliteration: "Ebiru no Shōtai! Shōgeki no Shōtaimu!?" (Japanese: エビルの正体！衝撃のショータイム！？)	Kazuya Kamihoriuchi	Hanta Kinoshita	October 10, 2021
7	"Theft!? Skateboard!? I'm Kagero!"; Transliteration: "Settō!? Sukebō!? Ore wa Kagerō!" (Japanese: 窃盗！？スケボー！？俺はカゲロウ！)	Satoshi Morota	Hanta Kinoshita	October 17, 2021
8	"A Family Rest, Heaven and Hell!?"; Transliteration: "Kazoku no Kyūsoku, Tengoku to Jigoku!?" (Japanese: 家族の休息、天国と地獄！？)	Satoshi Morota	Hanta Kinoshita	October 24, 2021
9	"Kagero Runs Rampant! The Igarashi Brothers...Crumble!?"; Transliteration: "Kagerō Bōsō! Igarashi Kyōdai...Hōkai!?" (Japanese: カゲロウ暴走！五十嵐兄弟…崩壊！？)	Koichi Sakamoto	Hanta Kinoshita	October 31, 2021
10	"Older and Younger Brother, Believing Heart"; Transliteration: "Ani to Otōto, Shinjiru Kokoro" (Japanese: 兄と弟、信じる心)	Koichi Sakamoto	Hanta Kinoshita	November 14, 2021
11	"Invincible Sakura, Power for What Purpose"; Transliteration: "Muteki no Sakura, Nan no Tame no Chikara" (Japanese: 無敵のさくら、何のための力)	Teruaki Sugihara	Hanta Kinoshita	November 21, 2021
12	"Weakness Is Strength!? The Invincible Jeanne!"; Transliteration: "Yowasa wa Tsuyosa!? Muteki no Jan'nu!" (Japanese: 弱さは強さ！？無敵のジャンヌ！)	Teruaki Sugihara	Hanta Kinoshita	November 28, 2021
13	"Fenix's Close Call!"; Transliteration: "Fenikkusu Kikiippatsu!" (Japanese: フェニックス危機一髪！)	Kazuya Kamihoriuchi	Hanta Kinoshita	December 5, 2021
14	"The Commander Is...a Deadman!?"; Transliteration: "Shireikan wa...Deddoman!?" (Japanese: 司令官は…デッドマン！？)	Kazuya Kamihoriuchi	Hanta Kinoshita	December 12, 2021
15	"Eradication! Showdown! Deadmans!"; Transliteration: "Bokumetsu! Taiketsu! Deddomanzu!" (Japanese: 撲滅！対決！デッドマンズ！)	Satoshi Morota	Hanta Kinoshita	December 19, 2021
16	"Feelings to Protect... The Era of the Three Igarashi Siblings!"; Transliteration: "Mamoritai Omoi...Jidai wa Igarashi San Kyōdai!" (Japanese: 守りたい想い…時代は五十嵐三兄妹！)	Satoshi Morota	Hanta Kinoshita	December 26, 2021
17	"Deepening Betrayal, the True Value of a Buddy"; Transliteration: "Uragiri no Shinka, Badi no Shinka" (Japanese: 裏切りの深化、バディの真価)	Teruaki Sugihara	Hanta Kinoshita	January 9, 2022
18	"A Buddy's Trajectory, the Miracle of Fire and Ice"; Transliteration: "Badi no Kiseki, Honō to Kōri no Kiseki" (Japanese: バディの軌跡、炎と氷の奇跡)	Teruaki Sugihara	Hanta Kinoshita	January 16, 2022
19	"Demons Warning, Hiromi Is Surrounded!?"; Transliteration: "Demonzu Chūihō, Hiromi Hōimō!?" (Japanese: デモンズ注意報、ヒロミ包囲網!?)	Koichi Sakamoto	Nobuhiro Mouri	January 23, 2022
20	"Ruthless and Temporary, the Price of Transformation"; Transliteration: "Hijō de Mujō na, Henshin no Daishō" (Japanese: 非情で無常な、変身の代償)	Koichi Sakamoto	Nobuhiro Mouri	January 30, 2022
21	"Laying Down My Life, Entrusting My Feelings"; Transliteration: "Waga Inochi o Kakete, Omoi o Takushite" (Japanese: 我が命をかけて、想いを託して)	Koichi Sakamoto	Nobuhiro Mouri	February 6, 2022
22	"Slam-Bang... Kūki Kaidan!?"; Transliteration: "Dottan Battan...Kūki Kaidan!?" (Japanese: ドッタンバッタン…空気階段！？)	Takayuki Shibasaki	Hanta Kinoshita	February 13, 2022
23	"Vice Takes Over... Betrayal After All!?"; Transliteration: "Baisu ga Nottori...Yappari Uragiri!?" (Japanese: バイスが乗っ取り…やっぱり裏切り！？)	Takayuki Shibasaki	Hanta Kinoshita	February 20, 2022
24	"Reversed by Dr. Karizaki! An Inverse Operation!"; Transliteration: "Karizaki-hakase no Modose! Abekobe Daisakusen!" (Japanese: 狩崎博士の戻せ！あべこべ大作戦！)	Kazuya Kamihoriuchi	Nobuhiro Mouri	February 27, 2022
25	"Revival! Vail!? Memories of the Igarashi Family"; Transliteration: "Yomigaeru! Beiru!? Igarashi-ke no Kioku" (Japanese: よみがえる！ベイル！？五十嵐家の記憶)	Kazuya Kamihoriuchi	Hanta Kinoshita	March 6, 2022
26	"Showdown! Farewell!? The End of Darkness and Light"; Transliteration: "Taiketsu! Ketsubetsu!? Yami to Hikari no Ketsumatsu" (Japanese: 対決！決別！？闇と光の結末)	Hidenori Ishida	Hanta Kinoshita	March 13, 2022
27	"Stop! Tyrant's Mayhem and Violence Gone Wild"; Transliteration: "Tomero! Bōkun no Bōkyo to Bōryoku no Bōsō" (Japanese: 止めろ！暴君の暴挙と暴力の暴走)	Hidenori Ishida	Hanta Kinoshita	March 20, 2022
28	"Overcoming Fear at Lightning Speed! Believe in Yourself as One!"; Transliteration: "Osore o Koete Shippūjinrai! Onore o Shinji Isshindōtai!" (Japanese: 怖れを超えて疾風迅雷！己を信じ一心同体！)	Hidenori Ishida	Hanta Kinoshita	March 27, 2022
29	"Crank-in! Memory of Hiromi!"; Transliteration: "Kuranku In! Memorī Obu Hiromī!" (Japanese: クランクイン！メモリー・オブ・ヒロミー！)	Koichiro Hayama	Hiroki Uchida	April 3, 2022
30	"Voice Actor! Say Me! The Aftermath of Youth"; Transliteration: "Seiyū! Sei Mī! Seishun no Atoshimatsu" (Japanese: 声優！SAY ME！青春のあとしまつ)	Teruaki Sugihara	Hanta Kinoshita	April 10, 2022
31	"Illusionary Guidance, Dream Afterwards"; Transliteration: "Gensō no Michibiki, Yume no Atosaki" (Japanese: 幻想の導き、夢のあとさき)	Teruaki Sugihara	Hanta Kinoshita	April 17, 2022
32	"Lost Place, Queen's Pride"; Transliteration: "Ushinatta Ibasho, Joō no Puraido" (Japanese: 失った居場所、女王のプライド)	Satoshi Morota	Hanta Kinoshita	April 24, 2022
33	"Lovekov's Rebellion!? Sakura's Resolution"; Transliteration: "Rabukofu Hankō!? Sakura no Kakugo" (Japanese: ラブコフ反抗！？さくらの覚悟)	Satoshi Morota	Hanta Kinoshita	May 1, 2022
34	"The Demon Calls the Demon"; Transliteration: "Akuma ga Akuma o Yondeiru" (Japanese: 悪魔が悪魔を呼んでいる)	Hidenori Ishida	Nobuhiro Mouri	May 8, 2022
35	"Unknown Threat, the Way People Should Go"; Transliteration: "Michi Naru Kyōi, Hito no Susumu beki Michi" (Japanese: 未知なる脅威、人の進むべき道)	Hidenori Ishida	Nobuhiro Mouri	May 15, 2022
36	"Humanity at the Crossroads, Each One's Determination"; Transliteration: "Kiro ni Tatsu Jinrui, Sorezore no Ketsui" (Japanese: 岐路に立つ人類、それぞれの決意)	Takayuki Shibasaki	Hanta Kinoshita	May 22, 2022
37	"Inevitable Fierce Battle! The Risky Demon Recapture Mission!"; Transliteration: "Gekisen Hisshi! Kesshi no Akuma Dakkan Misshon!" (Japanese: 激戦必至！決死の悪魔奪還ミッション！)	Takayuki Shibasaki	Hanta Kinoshita	May 29, 2022
38	"Father and Son Weaving Together! The Ultimate Revice!"; Transliteration: "Chichi to Ko ga Tsumugu! Kyūkyoku no Ribaisu!" (Japanese: 父と子が紡ぐ！究極のリバイス！)	Takayuki Shibasaki	Hanta Kinoshita	June 5, 2022
39	"Hope and Despair, the Conflict Between Three Siblings"; Transliteration: "Kibō to Zetsubō, San Kyōdai no Kattō" (Japanese: 希望と絶望、三兄妹の葛藤)	Kazuya Kamihoriuchi	Nobuhiro Mouri	June 12, 2022
40	"Family or the World... A Brothers Quarrel of the Soul!"; Transliteration: "Kazoku ka Sekai ka...Tamashii no Kyōdai Genka!" (Japanese: 家族か世界か…魂の兄弟喧嘩！)	Kazuya Kamihoriuchi	Nobuhiro Mouri	June 19, 2022
41	"A Father's True Intention, a Son's Determination!"; Transliteration: "Chichi no Shin'i, Musuko no Ketsui!" (Japanese: 父の真意、息子の決意！)	Teruaki Sugihara	Hanta Kinoshita	June 26, 2022
42	"Fierce Battle! Crimson Vail and Destream"; Transliteration: "Geki Batoru! Akaki Beiru to Desutorīmu" (Japanese: 激バトル！紅きベイルとデストリーム)	Teruaki Sugihara	Hanta Kinoshita	July 3, 2022
43	"The End of Eternity, Where Regret Leads"; Transliteration: "Eien no Owari, Kōkai no Mukau Saki" (Japanese: 永遠の終わり、後悔の向かう先)	Teruaki Sugihara	Hanta Kinoshita	July 10, 2022
44	"Laying Down My Body and Soul, the Path of the Decision"; Transliteration: "Zenshinzenrei o Kakete, Ketsudan no Yukue" (Japanese: 全身全霊をかけて、決断の行方)	Takayuki Shibasaki	Hanta Kinoshita	July 17, 2022
45	"Never-Ending Nightmare, Protectors and the Protected"; Transliteration: "Owaranu Akumu, Mamoru Mono to Mamorareru Mono" (Japanese: 終わらぬ悪夢、守る者と守られる者)	Hidenori Ishida	Hanta Kinoshita	July 24, 2022
46	"Courage to Face Each Other... What Should You Really Protect?"; Transliteration: "Mukiau Yūki...Shin ni Mamoru beki Mono wa Nani?" (Japanese: 向き合う勇気…真に護るべきものは何？)	Hidenori Ishida	Hanta Kinoshita	July 31, 2022
47	"Karizaki's Rebellion, the Price of Transformation"; Transliteration: "Karizaki no Hanran, Henshin no Daishō" (Japanese: 狩崎の反乱、変身の代償)	Kazuya Kamihoriuchi	Hanta Kinoshita	August 7, 2022
48	"Proof of Determination! This Is...Japan's No. 1 Busybody!"; Transliteration: "Kakugo no Shōmei! Kore ga...Nihon'ichi no Osekkai!" (Japanese: 覚悟の証明！これが…日本一のお節介！)	Kazuya Kamihoriuchi	Hanta Kinoshita	August 14, 2022
49	"At the End of the Battle... Only the Demon Remains"; Transliteration: "Tatakai no Hate...Nokotta no wa Akuma dake" (Japanese: 戦いの果て…残ったのは悪魔だけ)	Takayuki Shibasaki	Hanta Kinoshita	August 21, 2022
50 (Finale)	"Family to the End, Until the Day We Meet Again"; Transliteration: "Akumade Kazoku, Itsuka Mata Au Hi made" (Japanese: あくまで家族、いつかまた会う日まで)	Takayuki Shibasaki	Hanta Kinoshita	August 28, 2022

== Production ==
The Kamen Rider Revice trademark was registered by Toei on May 6, 2021.

On July 27, 2021, Kamen Rider Revice was officially announced during an online production announcement conference alongside its cast.

The opening theme song "liveDevil" is performed by the vocal and dance group Da-ice collaborating with Subaru Kimura.

Kamen Rider Revi's main vehicle, a hoverbike that Kamen Rider Vice can transform into, is based on the real life XTurismo hoverbike developed by A.L.I. Technologies.

Initially, the original concept for Revice was that all of the past Kamen Rider series took place in their own TV series. However, due to Kamen Rider Revice guest starring in Kamen Rider Saber, the staff decided to create a new concept inspired by Kamen Rider Den-O and Kamen Rider Zi-O instead. Another concept considered for the series was a "post-COVID-19 pandemic road trip" story wherein Revi would explore a new era in the aftermath of the pandemic, with the idea of "moving forward" being a central theme. However, difficulties from the pandemic itself made it difficult to execute, resulting in it being changed to a family-themed drama, reflecting how lockdowns have allowed families staying together more opportunities to bond with each other.

=== Impact of the COVID-19 pandemic ===
Sakura Igarashi's actor, Ayaka Imoto, tested positive for COVID-19 on February 28, 2022, and recovered on March 7, 2022.

=== Controversy ===
One of Kamen Rider Revice's assistant producers filed a complaint to the General Support Union (総合サポートユニオン, Sōgō Sapōto Yunion), a trade union that fights for workers' rights, regarding her position in the Kamen Rider series as a whole ever since her promotion into her current position. Among the addressed problems are sexual harassment, unpaid overtime, and the chief producer overlooking her problems and not taking them seriously. Despite the hardships she endured, the assistant producer assured that Revice's cast members are easy to work with and unrelated to her problems.

== Films ==
Kamen Riders Revi and Vice made their first appearance as a cameo in the crossover film Saber + Zenkaiger: Super Hero Senki, along with a special film of the same title as the series double-billed with it. The events of the special film take place between episodes three and four of the series.

=== Beyond Generations ===
Kamen Rider: Beyond Generations (仮面ライダー ビヨンド・ジェネレーションズ, Kamen Raidā Biyondo Jenerēshonzu) is a crossover film released on December 17, 2021, starring the casts of Revice and Kamen Rider Saber. The film also features a new Kamen Rider from a possible future in the year 2071, 100 years after the debut of the first Kamen Rider television series, called Kamen Rider Century. Additionally, actors Akiyoshi Nakao and Arata Furuta portrayed Ryunosuke and Hideo Momose, while Maito Fujioka, the son of Hiroshi Fujioka, portrayed Takeshi Hongo's younger self. The film was written by Nobuhiro Mouri and directed by Takayuki Shibasaki. The theme song is "Promise" performed by Da-ice. The events of the film take place between episodes 13 and 14 of the series.

=== Battle Familia ===
Kamen Rider Revice the Movie: Battle Familia (劇場版 仮面ライダーリバイス バトルファミリア, Gekijōban Kamen Raidā Ribaisu Batoru Famiria) is a tie-in film released on July 22, 2022, double-billed with Avataro Sentai Donbrothers the Movie: New First Love Hero. Actors Norito Yashima, Haruka Tateishi, Issei Mamehara, and Kane Kosugi portrayed Masato Sotoumi, Yume Takeda, Nozomu Ōtani, and Azuma respectively, and comedian Shingo Fujimori voiced Chic. Additionally, the main character of Kamen Rider Geats made his first appearance. The film was written by Hanta Kinoshita and directed by Koichi Sakamoto. The theme song is "Dance Dance" performed by Da-ice feat. Subaru Kimura. The events of the film take place between Birth of Chimera and episode 47 of the series.

=== Movie Battle Royale ===
Kamen Rider Geats × Revice: Movie Battle Royale (仮面ライダーギーツ×リバイス MOVIEバトルロワイヤル, Kamen Raidā Gītsu Ribaisu Mūbī Batoru Rowaiyaru) is a crossover film released on December 23, 2022, starring the casts of Revice and Kamen Rider Geats. Additionally, Takamasa Suga, Satoshi Matsuda, and Takashi Hagino reprised their respective roles as Shinji Kido, Ren Akiyama, and Takeshi Asakura from Kamen Rider Ryuki and appear as supporting cast members to commemorate their series' twentieth anniversary. The film was written by Yuya Takahashi and Hanta Kinoshita and directed by Takayuki Shibasaki. The theme song is "Change my future" performed by Koda Kumi.

== Web-exclusive series ==
- Kamen Rider Revice: The Mystery (仮面ライダーリバイス The Mystery, Kamen Raidā Ribaisu Za Misuterī): A five-episode web-exclusive crossover series released on Telasa on January 30, 2022. Additionally, Minehiro Kinomoto, Taira Imata, Ryo Matsuda, Metal Yoshida, and Mitsuru Karahashi reprised their respective roles as Ryu Terui from Kamen Rider W, Genpachiro Otta from Kamen Rider Drive, Hideyasu Jonouchi and Oren Pierre Alfonso from Kamen Rider Gaim, and Naoya Kaido from Kamen Rider 555. The theme song is "Without you" performed by Ikki Igarashi & Hiromi Kadota (Kentaro Maeda & Junya Komatsu). The events of the web-exclusive series take place between episodes 16 and 17 of the series.
- Revice Legacy: Kamen Rider Vail (リバイスレガシー 仮面ライダーベイル, Ribaisu Regashī Kamen Raidā Beiru): A five-episode web-exclusive series released on Toei Tokusatsu Fan Club on March 27, 2022. The theme song is "My dream" performed by Yukimi Igarashi (Kurara Emi & Sakurako Okubo). The events of the web-exclusive series take place 25 years prior to the series.
- Boiling Up and Feeling Great! Revice Anime: Steam Paradise a Go! Go! (ゆだって最高！リバイスアニメ 湯けむりパラダイス A Go! Go!, Yudatte Saikō! Ribaisu Anime Yukemuri Paradaisu A Gō! Gō!): A web-exclusive animated short series released on Toei Tokusatsu Fan Club on April 9, 2022.
- Birth of Chimera: A web-exclusive series released on Toei Tokusatsu Fan Club on July 22, 2022. The events of the web-exclusive series take place between episode 44 of the series and Kamen Rider Revice the Movie: Battle Familia.
- Kamen Rider Jeanne & Kamen Rider Aguilera with Girls Remix (仮面ライダージャンヌ&仮面ライダーアギレラ withガールズリミックス, Kamen Raidā Jan'nu Ando Kamen Raidā Agirera Wizu Gāruzu Rimikkusu): A three-episode web-exclusive crossover series released on Toei Tokusatsu Fan Club on August 7, 2022. Additionally, Noa Tsurushima, Mei Angela, Hikaru Yamamoto, Ruka Matsuda, Yuko Takayama, Mio Kudo, Yukari Taki, and Shieri Ohata reprised their respective roles as Is from Kamen Rider Zero-One, Reika Shindai from Kamen Rider Saber, Akiko Narumi from W, Poppy Pipopapo from Kamen Rider Ex-Aid, Rinko Daimon from Kamen Rider Wizard, Kanon Fukami from Kamen Rider Ghost, Sawa Takigawa from Kamen Rider Build, and Tsukuyomi from Kamen Rider Zi-O while Hiroe Igeta reprised her voice role as Kamen Rider Valkyrie from Zero-One. The theme song is "Riot in bloom" performed by Hana Natsuki (Yui Asakura).
- Kamen Rider Juuga vs. Kamen Rider Orteca (仮面ライダージュウガVS仮面ライダーオルテカ, Kamen Raidā Jūga Bāsasu Kamen Raidā Oruteka): A two-episode web-exclusive crossover series released on Toei Tokusatsu Fan Club on April 30, 2023. Additionally, Rei Yoshii and Taira Imata reprised their respective roles as Rinna Sawagami and Genpachiro Otta from Drive. The events of the web-exclusive special take place after Revice Forward: Kamen Rider Live & Evil & Demons.

== DVD and Blu-ray-exclusive series ==
- Kamen Rider Revice: Koala vs. Kangaroo!! Crying Out Love in the Middle of the Wedding Ceremony!? (仮面ライダーリバイス コアラVSカンガルー！！結婚式のチューしんで愛をさけぶ！？, Kamen Raidā Ribaisu Koara Bāsasu Kangarū!! Kekkonshiki no Chūshin de Ai o Sakebu!?): Televi-Kun's "Hyper Battle DVD" (超(ハイパー)バトルDVD, Haipā Batoru Dī Bui Dī).
- Dear Gaga: A two-episode side story included as part of the Blu-ray releases of Kamen Rider Revice. It focuses on Hiromi Kadota and takes place in between episodes 21 and 29 of the series.
- Kamen Rider Revice: Becoming Rider 2♪ (仮面ライダーリバイス 2号ライダーはじめました～♪, Kamen Raidā Ribaisu Ni-gō Raidā Hajimemashitā♪): Televi-Kun's "Hyper Battle DVD".

== V-Cinema ==
Revice Forward: Kamen Rider Live & Evil & Demons (リバイスForward 仮面ライダーライブ&エビル&デモンズ, Ribaisu Fowādo Kamen Raidā Raibu Ando Ebiru Ando Demonzu) is a V-Cinema release which received a limited theatrical release on February 10, 2023, followed by its DVD and Blu-ray release on May 10, 2023. The events of the V-Cinema take place after the end of the main series. The V-Cinema was written by Nobuhiro Mouri and directed by Koichi Sakamoto. The opening theme song is "Come Alive" performed by Daiji Igarashi and Hiromi Kadota (Wataru Hyuga and Junya Komatsu), and the ending theme song is "Love yourself" performed by #Nice FamiRiva (#ナイスファミリバ, Hasshutagu Naisu Famiriba), which consists of Kentaro Maeda, Wataru Hyuga, Ayaka Imoto, Noritaka Hamao, Yui Asakura, Hayata Seki, Kurodo Hachijoin, and Junya Komatsu.

== Manga & Novel ==
- Kamen Rider Revice: My Brother Is Kamen Rider (仮面ライダーリバイス オレの兄貴は仮面ライダー, Kamen Raidā Ribaisu Ore no Aniki wa Kamen Raidā): A one-shot manga included in the Kamen Rider Revice Secret Book, a bonus booklet distributed to the first 400,000 attendees of Saber + Zenkaiger: Super Hero Senki on August 7, 2021. The manga is composed by producer Taku Mochizuki and illustrated by Mugi and Waima Hino, and tells the story of the Kamen Rider Revice film from Daiji Igarashi's point of view.
- From 2071/Record of a Certain 7 Days (From 2071 / ある7日間の記録, Furomu Nisen-nanajū-ichi/Aru Nanoka-kan no Kiroku): A short story in the booklet included in the Collector's Pack Deluxe Edition of the Blu-ray release of Kamen Rider: Beyond Generations.
- Novel: Kamen Rider Revice: One Possibility (小説 仮面ライダーリバイス ONE POSSIBILITY, Shōsetsu Kamen Raidā Ribaisu Wan Posshibiritī): A novel written by Hanta Kinoshita and released on February 2, 2026. The events of the novel take place in a "what-if" alternate timeline separate from the events of the series.

== Cast ==
- Ikki Igarashi (五十嵐 一輝, Igarashi Ikki): Kentaro Maeda (前田 拳太郎, Maeda Kentarō)
- Daiji Igarashi (五十嵐 大二, Igarashi Daiji), Kagero (カゲロウ, Kagerō): Wataru Hyuga (日向 亘, Hyūga Wataru)
- Sakura Igarashi (五十嵐 さくら, Igarashi Sakura): Ayaka Imoto (井本 彩花, Imoto Ayaka)
- George Karizaki (ジョージ・狩崎, Jōji Karizaki): Noritaka Hamao (濱尾 ノリタカ, Hamao Noritaka)
- Aguilera (アギレラ, Agirera), Hana Natsuki (夏木 花, Natsuki Hana): Yui Asakura (浅倉 唯, Asakura Yui)
- Orteca (オルテカ, Oruteka): Hayata Seki (関 隼汰, Seki Hayata)
- Julio (フリオ, Furio)/Gō Tamaki (玉置 豪, Tamaki Gō): Kurodo Hachijoin (八条院 蔵人, Hachijōin Kurōdo)
- Hiromi Kadota (門田 ヒロミ, Kadota Hiromi): Junya Komatsu (小松 準弥, Komatsu Jun'ya)
- Hikaru Ushijima (牛島 光, Ushijima Hikaru): Tomoya Oku (奥 智哉, Oku Tomoya)
- Shōzō Irabu (伊良部 正造, Irabu Shōzō): Yutaka Saigoh (西郷 豊, Saigō Yutaka)
- Yūjirō Wakabayashi (若林 優次郎, Wakabayashi Yūjirō), Chameleon Deadman (カメレオン・デッドマン, Kamereon Deddoman): Kazuya Tanabe (田邊 和也, Tanabe Kazuya)
- Tasuke Ushijima (牛島 太助, Ushijima Tasuke): Toshihiro Yashiba (矢柴 俊博, Yashiba Toshihiro)
- Hideo Akaishi (赤石 英雄, Akaishi Hideo): Jun Hashimoto (橋本 じゅん, Hashimoto Jun)
- Yukimi Igarashi (五十嵐 幸実, Igarashi Yukimi): Kurara Emi (映美 くらら, Emi Kurara)
- Genta Igarashi (五十嵐 元太, Igarashi Genta): Shigeyuki Totsugi (戸次 重幸, Totsugi Shigeyuki)

=== Voice cast ===
- Vice (バイス, Baisu), Himself (30–31, 50): Subaru Kimura (木村 昴, Kimura Subaru)
- Vail (ベイル, Beiru), Vail Driver (ベイルドライバー, Beiru Doraibā): Kenjiro Tsuda (津田 健次郎, Tsuda Kenjirō)
- Lovekov (ラブコフ, Rabukofu), Herself (31): Miku Itō (伊藤 美来, Itō Miku)
- Masumi Karizaki (狩崎 真澄, Karizaki Masumi): Shinshu Fuji (藤 真秀, Fuji Shinshū)
- Giff (ギフ, Gifu): Kazuhiko Inoue (井上 和彦, Inoue Kazuhiko)
- Revice Driver (リバイスドライバー, Ribaisu Doraibā), Two SiDriver (ツーサイドライバー, Tsū Saidoraibā), Libera Driver (リベラドライバー, Ribera Doraibā), Destream Driver (デストリームドライバー, Desutorīmu Doraibā), Vistamps (バイスタンプ, Baisutanpu): Shingo Fujimori (藤森 慎吾, Fujimori Shingo)
- Juuga Driver (ジュウガドライバー, Jūga Doraibā), Himself (31): Ryō Horikawa (堀川 りょう, Horikawa Ryō)

=== Guest cast ===
- Tomoyuki Harada (原田 智之, Harada Tomoyuki; 1): Minoru Suzuki (鈴木 みのる, Suzuki Minoru)
- Shigeo Honda (本田 茂夫, Honda Shigeo; 5): Kikuō Hayashiya (林家 木久扇, Hayashiya Kikuō)
- Yasushi Kudō (工藤 康, Kudō Yasushi; 6, 13–15): Gamon Kaai (河相 我聞, Kaai Gamon)
- Kōji Maezono (前園 孝治, Maezono Kōji; 7): Jun Hashizume (橋爪 淳, Hashizume Jun)
- Scammers (9–10): Hiroya Matsumoto (松本 寛也, Matsumoto Hiroya), Mizuki Saiba (西葉 瑞希, Saiba Mizuki)
- Scammer (9–10, 50) Tetsuji Sakakibara (榊原 徹士, Sakakibara Tetsuji)
- Amahiko Haitani (灰谷 天彦, Haitani Amahiko; 11–15): Shuji Kashiwabara (柏原 収史, Kashiwabara Shūji)
- Chameleon Deadman's original human form (14, 16): Ayumu Kato (加藤 歩, Katō Ayumu)
- Chigusa Yamagiri (山桐 千草, Yamagiri Chigusa; 19–20): Kazusa Okuyama (奥山 かずさ, Okuyama Kazusa)
- Tatsuhiko Tabuchi (田淵 竜彦, Tabuchi Tatsuhiko; 19–20): Kiyotaka Uji (宇治 清高, Uji Kiyotaka)
- Themselves (22–23): Kūki Kaidan (空気階段)
- Tatsunori Hirano (平野 辰則, Hirano Tatsunori; 22): Yu Miyazawa (宮澤 佑, Miyazawa Yū)
- Himself (30): Kenichi Suzumura (鈴村 健一, Suzumura Ken'ichi)
- Himself (30): Hiroshi Kamiya (神谷 浩史, Kamiya Hiroshi)
- Young Masumi Karizaki (42–43, 48): Kensuke Takahashi (高橋 健介, Takahashi Kensuke)
- Kazu (カズ; 50): Kazuyoshi Miura (三浦 知良, Miura Kazuyoshi)
- Ace Ukiyo (浮世 英寿, Ukiyo Ēsu; 50): Hideyoshi Kan (簡 秀吉, Kan Hideyoshi)

== Theme songs ==
Opening theme

- "liveDevil"
  - Lyrics: Shoko Fujibayashi
  - Composition: MUSOH, STEVEN LEE, SLIPKID, Sota Hanamura
  - Arrangement: STEVEN LEE
  - Add Arrangement: Hiroyuki Fujino
  - Artist: Da-ice feat. Subaru Kimura
  Episodes 1, 18, 20, 42, 48, and 50 do not feature the show's opening sequence. This song is used as an insert song in episodes 1, 10, 18, 20, 42, 48, and 50.

Insert themes

- "Go with the flo"
  - Lyrics: Shoko Fujibayashi
  - Composition: Kōtarō Nakagawa
  - Arrangement: tatsuso
  - Artist: Ikki, Daiji, & Sakura Igarashi (Kentaro Maeda, Wataru Hyuga, & Ayaka Imoto)
  - Episodes: 16
- "VOLCANO"
  - Lyrics: Shoko Fujibayashi
  - Composition: tatsuso
  - Artist: Ikki Igarashi & Vice (Kentaro Maeda & Subaru Kimura)
  - Episodes: 17
- "#GekiyaVice" (#激ヤバイス, Hasshutagu Gekiyabaisu; "#Awesome Vice")
  - Lyrics: Bintaro Cola
  - Composition: tatsuo
  - Artist: Vice (Subaru Kimura)
  - Episodes: 29
- "My dream"
  - Lyrics: Shio Watanabe
  - Composition & Arrangement: Go Sakabe
  - Artist: Yukimi Igarashi (Kurara Emi)
  - Episodes: 42
- "Mirage Mirror"
  - Lyrics: Shoko fujibayashi
  - Composition: Ryo
  - Artist: Daiji Igarashi & Kagero (Wataru Hyuga)
  - Episodes: 44
- "Cherry-ish!"
  - Lyrics: Isa Takinoo
  - Composition: tatsuso
  - Artist: Sakura Igarashi & Lovekov (Ayaka Imoto & Miku Itō)
  - Episodes: 46
- "Kimi wa Sonomama de" (君はそのままで; "You Stay the Same")
  - Lyrics: Shoko Fujibayashi
  - Composition: tatsuo
  - Artist: Ikki Igarashi (Kentaro Maeda)
  - Episodes: 50

== Reception ==
In an online popularity poll for characters of Kamen Rider Revice, conducted by Japanese website NLab Media, Hiromi Kadota emerges as the first place victor with a total of 1845 votes out of 4528. His dedication as Kamen Rider Demons and the desire to move forward even after the loss of his leader and subordinates are cited by the voters as one of the good points behind his popularity.
