= Ryuki =

Ryuki may refer to:

- Ryūki, a masculine Japanese given name
- Ingen Ryūki (1592–1673), a Chinese Buddhist monk
- Kamen Rider Ryuki, a tokusatsu television series that ran from 2002 to 2003

- Shinji Kido who becomes Kamen Rider Ryuki, its title character
