= Kamen Rider Ryuki: Episode Final =

- Cover art of DVD.

Japanese name
- Kanji: 劇場版 仮面ライダー龍騎 EPISODE FINAL
Transcriptions
- Revised Hepburn: Gekijōban Kamen Raidā Ryūki Episōdo Fainaru
- Directed by: Ryuta Tasaki
- Written by: Toshiki Inoue
- Based on: Kamen Rider Ryuki by Yasuko Kobayashi
- Produced by: Ishimori Productions; Toei
- Starring: Takamasa Suga; Satoshi Matsuda; Ayano Sugiyama; Natsuki Katō
- Cinematography: Fumio Matsumura
- Edited by: Naoki Osada
- Music by: Cher Watanabe; Kazunori Maruyama
- Production company: Toei
- Distributed by: Toei Co. Ltd
- Release date: August 17, 2002
- Running time: 78 minutes; 97 (Director's Cut)
- Country: Japan
- Language: Japanese
- Box office: $10,112,538

Kamen Rider Ryuki The Movie: Episode Final (劇場版 仮面ライダー龍騎 EPISODE FINAL, Gekijōban Kamen Raidā Ryūki Episōdo Fainaru) is the theatrical superhero film adaptation of the Japanese 2002 Kamen Rider series, Kamen Rider Ryuki, directed by Ryuta Tasaki and written by Toshiki Inoue. The catchphrases for the movie are "An Epic Battle Beyond Imagination." (想像を超える壮大な戦闘〈バトル〉。, Sōzō o Koeru Sōdai na Batoru.) and "Ryuki, a Shocking Conclusion. Final Episode, the Movie." (龍騎、衝撃の結末。最終回、先行映画化。, Ryūki, Shōgeki no Ketsumatsu. Saishūkai, Senkō Eigaka.).

The film is produced by Ishimori Productions and Toei, the producers of all the previous television series and films of the Kamen Rider series. Following the tradition of all Heisei Kamen Rider movies, it is a double bill with the movie for 2002's Super Sentai series Ninpuu Sentai Hurricaneger, Ninpuu Sentai Hurricaneger: Shushuuto the Movie, both of which premiered on August 17, 2002. The film's title is translated into English as Masked Rider Ryuki The Movie: Episode Final.

== Plot ==
This movie is an alternate ending to the series, taking place after the events of episode 46. With only six Riders remaining in the Rider Fight, Shirō Kanzaki feels that time is running short to save Yui's life. At that time, Yui shows Shinji Kido and Ren Akiyama her childhood drawings and explains the reasoning for the Mirror World monsters and Shiro's reason to start the Rider Fight.

Shinji bumps into Miho Kirishima after she cons another wealthy man and takes Shinji's wallet. He chases after her before learning she Kamen Rider Femme prior to them being forced into fighting Mirror World monsters, Shinji making a failed attempt to convince her that they have to fight each other. Eventually, all but one of the riders are gathered by Shiro for an out-all fight, Miho revealed to be seeking revenge on Takeshi Asakura who murdered her sister and to resurrect her. But during the fight, Kamen Rider Ouja overwhelms Femme and was about to finish her off with Genocider when the Contract Monster is destroyed by a black-colored version of Kamen Rider Ryuki called Ryuga(an evil mirrorworld counterpart of Shinji Kido). His Kamen Rider form regressed to a Blank State before Femme destroys his Advent deck keeping him alive in the Mirror World, Takeshi disintegrates while attempting to kill the woman. Later, having intended to continue fighting, Shuichi Kitaoka renounces being Kamen Rider Zolda and forfeits to use his remaining moments to date Reiko Momoi.

Having assumed Shinji saved her from Takashi, Miho treats him to dinner while expressing her gratitude to the confused Shinji. While in the bathroom, the mirror Shinji enters, and disguised as the real one, tries to throw Miho off the roof of a building. As she realizes that he is not Shinji, he reveals himself as Ryuga, and Miho transforms to Femme to fight him. Ren as Kamen Rider Knight and fighting another Mirror World monster, notices Ryuga and Femme fighting, mistaking Ryuga to be Shinji. Femme is mortally wounded, but saved by Shinji as Ryuki, who then catches a glimpse of his own mirror doppelgänger before Ryuga leaves. After leaving the Mirror World, Shinji and Miho share a final moment together, before Miho dies from her wounds.

Ren returns to Shinji, thinking Shinji has finally realized the meaning of the Rider Fight and demands the two of them fight, while Shinji rejects Ren bluntly and claims he never thought of that.

Shinji remembers that he had previously known Yui as a child, and had abandoned her. This made her create a doppelgänger Shinji in the Mirror World, then revealed as the mysterious Kamen Rider Ryuga, a darker form of Ryuki. Shinji feels that it was his fault that resulted in the creation of a darker version of himself. Taking Shinji's guilt into account, Ryuga tricks Shinji into uniting both bodies, so he can be a real human, taking over Shinji's body in the process.

This is seen by Ren, who transforms into Knight and battles Ryuga, the two of them fighting while Yui's life shortens further. After defeating Knight, Ryuga tries to strike the killing blow before Shinji within Ryuga struggles. The two beings separate and they fight each other. After a climactic battle, Ryuga is killed by his original counterpart via Ryuki's Final Vent.

Ren tells Shinji that he must win, and that Shinji agrees he will not let up and will fight Ren willingly. Before they fight, Shinji and Ren transform into their respective Survive Rider forms and face a horde of Hydragoon Mirror World monsters as the movie ends.

== Cast ==
- Takamasa Suga as Shinji Kido, Mirror Shinji Kido
- Satoshi Matsuda as Ren Akiyama
- Ayano Sugiyama as Yui Kanzaki
- Kenzaburo Kikuchi as Shiro Kanzaki
- Ryohei as Shuichi Kitaoka
- Tomohisa Yuge as Goro Yura
- Takashi Hagino as Takeshi Asakura
- Kanji Tsuda as Daisuke Okubo
- Sayaka Kuon as Reiko Momoi
- Hitomi Kurihara as Nanako Shimada
- Kazue Tsunogae as Sanako Kanzaki
- Natsuki Katō as Miho Kirishima
- Eugene Nomura as Restaurant Customer (DC ver. only)
- Yoji Sawamukai (Played as "沢向 要士") as Kazuo Mizuoka
- Erena as Miho Kirishima's Older Sister
- Yoshikazu Ebisu as Owner of Mansion
- Bengaru as Taxi Driver
- Toshiki Kashu as Restaurant Staff (cameo)
- Rina Akiyama as Amusement Park Staff (cameo)
- Yūsuke Tomoi as Takeshi Asakura's Victim (cameo)
- Jun Kaname (cameo), Tōko Fujita (cameo), Jun Yamasaki (cameo) as Okonomiyaki Restaurant Customers
- Akiyoshi Shibata (cameo) as Okonomiyaki Restaurant Staff
- Hiroyuki Shibamoto, Shigenori Sōya, Yoshimasa Chida, Katsumi Shiono as Sheerghost/Raydragoon voice
- Tsuyoshi Koyama as Visor Voice

== Songs ==
Theme song

- "Alive A life -Advent Mix-"
  - Lyrics: Yuko Ebine
  - Composition: Kohei Wada
  - Arrangement: Takahiro Ando
  - Artist: Rica Matsumoto

== Reception ==
Kamen Rider Ryuki: Episode Final grossed $10,112,538 at the box office.
