= List of Kamen Rider Ryuki characters =

Kamen Rider Ryuki (仮面ライダー龍騎, Kamen Raidā Ryūki) is a Japanese tokusatsu series that serves as the 12th installment in the Kamen Rider franchise and the third entry in the Heisei era. The series follows idealist journalist Shinji Kido as he attempts to stop the violent Rider Fight from claiming more innocent lives than it already has.

== Main characters ==
=== Shinji Kido ===
Shinji Kido (城戸 真司, Kido Shinji) is a kind-hearted, friendly, simple, and naïve idealist who works at the ORE Journal as a journalist trainee until he finds one of Shiro Kanzaki's Card Decks, encounters the Chinese dragon-themed Dragreder (ドラグレッダー, Doragureddā) Mirror Monster, and stumbles into the Mirror World while investigating Koichi Sakakibara's disappearance. Despite being told to stay out of the Rider Fight by Ren Akiyama, Shinji chooses to join anyway to stop the other Mirror Monsters from devouring people and stop the Rider Fight, forming a contract with Dragreder and becoming Kamen Rider Ryuki in the process. By the series finale, he dies protecting civilians from a pack of Mirror Monsters, but Shiro reverses the Rider Fight's events, resurrecting its participants and allowing them to resume their normal lives.

As Kamen Rider Ryuki, Shinji is equipped with the Drag Visor (ドラグバイザー, Doragu Baizā) gauntlet, which allows him to summon Dragreder, the Drag Saber (ドラグセイバー, Doragu Seibā), the pyrokinetic Drag Claw (ドラグクロー, Doragu Kurō) gauntlet, and/or the twin Drag Shields (ドラグシールド, Doragu Shīrudo) and perform the Dragon Rider Kick (ドラゴンライダーキック, Doragon Raidā Kikku) finisher alongside Dragreder with the appropriate Advent Cards.

Later in the series, Shinji acquires the Survive Rekka (サバイブ烈火, Sabaibu Rekka; Survive Raging Fire) card, which allows him to transform into his final form, Kamen Rider Ryuki Survive (仮面ライダー龍騎サバイブ, Kamen Raidā Ryūki Sabaibu), and evolve Dragreder into Dragranzer (ドラグランザー, Doraguranzā). While transformed, he wields the Drag Visor Zwei (ドラグバイザーツバイ, Doragu Baizā Tsubai) firearm, which can be either used to perform the Meteor Bullet (メテオバレット, Meteo Buretto) attack alongside Dragranzer or reconfigured into the Drag Blade (ドラグブレード, Doragu Burēdo) sword. He can also reconfigure Dragranzer into its motorcycle-like Bike Mode (バイクモード, Baiku Mōdo), which allows him to perform the Dragon Fire Storm (ドラゴンファイヤーストーム, Doragon Faiyā Sutōmu) finisher.

Shinji Kido is portrayed by Takamasa Suga (須賀 貴匡, Suga Takamasa).

=== Ren Akiyama ===
Ren Akiyama (秋山 蓮, Akiyama Ren) is a cold loner who fights constantly and is frequently unemployed. Sometime prior to the series, he joined Shiro Kanzaki's Rider Fight to revive his fiancé, Eri Ogawa, from a coma she fell into following an encounter with the bat-themed Darkwing (ダークウイング, Dākuuingu) Mirror Monster, who he formed a contract with to become Kamen Rider Knight (仮面ライダーナイト, Kamen Raidā Naito). Despite initial reluctance, he befriends Shinji and fights alongside him to stop both Mirror Monsters and malicious Rider Fight competitors until Shinji gives his life saving civilians. Ultimately, Ren faces the last participant, Kamen Rider Odin, in combat until Shiro's sister Yui dies, causing Odin to fade away. Despite becoming the winner by default, Shiro reverses the Rider Fight, leading to Ren becoming a full-time employee at the Atori coffee shop while Eri is revived in the new timeline.

As Kamen Rider Knight, Ren wields the Dark Visor (ダークバイザー, Dāku Baizā) rapier, which allows him to summon Darkwing, the Wing Lancer (ウイングランサー, Uingu Ransā) lance, the cape-like Wing Wall (ウイングウォール, Uingu Uōru) shield, and/or Shadow Illusion (シャドーイリュージョン, Shadō Iryūjon) copies of himself and perform the Flying Lancer (飛翔斬, Hishōzan) finisher alongside Darkwing with the appropriate Advent Cards.

Later in the series, Ren acquires the Survive Shippu (サバイブ疾風, Sabaibu Shippū; Survive Hurricane) card, which allows him to transform into his final form, Kamen Rider Knight Survive (仮面ライダーナイトサバイブ, Kamen Raidā Naito Sabaibu), and evolve Darkwing into Darkraider (ダークレイダー, Dākureidā). While transformed, he is equipped with the left forearm-mounted Dark Visor Zwei (ダークバイザーツバイ, Dāku Baizā Tsubai) scabbard, which can either be reconfigured into the Dark Arrow (ダークアロー, Dāku Arō) crossbow or separate into the Dark Blade (ダークブレード, Dāku Burēdo) sword and the Dark Shield (ダークシールド, Dāku Shīrudo). He can also reconfigure Darkraider into Bike Mode, which allows him to perform the Hurricane Edge (疾風断, Shippūdan) finisher.

Ren Akiyama is portrayed by Satoshi Matsuda (松田 悟志, Matsuda Satoshi).

=== Yui Kanzaki ===
Yui Kanzaki (神崎 優衣, Kanzaki Yui) is a young caring woman who had been aiding Ren prior to the series to locate her long-lost brother Shiro. While investigating Shiro's disappearance over the course of the series, she discovers the drawings they made as children served as the basis for the Mirror World's monsters and that, due to their neglectful parents, the real Yui died and allowed her Mirror World counterpart to inhabit her body. Due to being unable to survive outside of the Mirror World, the doppelganger will die on Yui's twentieth birthday, which led to Shiro developing the Rider Fight in the hopes of saving her. Having repressed these memories, Yui remains unaware of them until the present. Despite Shiro, Ren, and Shinji's best efforts, the Mirror World Yui fades from existence short of the deadline, though her spirit appears before Shiro to tell him she did not want him to save her in the manner he wanted, inspiring him to reverse the Rider Fight's events.

In an alternate ending depicted in the film Kamen Rider Ryuki: Episode Final, the lonely Yui had met and befriended Shinji as children, but he seemingly abandoned her despite promising not to. Yui was invited by her Mirror World counterpart to play with her, only to learn she will immediately die if she returns to the real world. Yui's doppelganger loaned the original her lifespan, which will last until her twentieth birthday, in exchange for Yui and Shiro's drawings. After joining Shinji and Ren in their fight against the Mirror Monsters in the present, Yui eventually dies, though an angered Shiro does not end the Rider Fight.

Yui Kanzaki is portrayed by Ayano Sugiyama (杉山 彩乃, Sugiyama Ayano).

=== Shiro Kanzaki ===
Shiro Kanzaki (神崎 士郎, Kanzaki Shirō) is a mysterious scientific genius and Yui's older brother who was taken to live with relatives in America thirteen years prior to the series. He conducted research in the Mirror World (ミラーワールド, Mirā Wārudo), a parallel dimension opposite to the real world inhabited by Mirror Monsters (ミラーモンスター, Mirā Monsutā), before he disappeared and was presumed dead. In reality, he merged with his Mirror World counterpart to survive in the Mirror World. In the intervening years, he developed chronokinesis and created thirteen Card Decks (カードデッキ, Kādo Dekki) each with their own set of Advent Cards (アドベントカード, Adobento Kādo), V-Buckle (Vバックル, Bui Bakkuru) belts, Visor (バイザー, Baizā) card readers, and Ride Shooter (ライドシューター, Raido Shūtā) motorcycles to establish the Rider Fight (ライダーの戦い, Raidā no Tatakai) battle royal in the hopes of averting Yui's death, which is said to take place on her twentieth birthday, by promising to grant the winner one wish in exchange for killing their fellow competitors. By the series finale, Shiro allows Yui to die and honors her dying wish of reversing time to avert the Rider Fight.

Shiro developed the Card Decks and Advent Cards to allow the 13 Kamen Riders (13人の仮面ライダー, Jūsan-nin no Kamen Raidā) to survive in the Mirror World by forming contracts with and draw energy from their Contract Monsters (契約モンスター, Keiyaku Monsutā) in return for feeding them the life forces of the Mirror Monsters they destroy.

Shiro Kanzaki is portrayed by Kenzaburo Kikuchi (菊地 謙三郎, Kikuchi Kenzaburō).

=== Kamen Rider Zolda ===
Kamen Rider Zolda (仮面ライダーゾルダ, Kamen Raidā Zoruda) is a moniker utilized by its original user and his successor who is aided by the Minotaur-themed Magnugiga (マグナギガ, Magunagiga) Mirror Monster.

As Kamen Rider Zolda, the user wields the Magnu Visor (マグナバイザー, Maguna Baizā) submachine gun, which allows them to summon Magnugiga, the twin back-mounted Giga Cannons (ギガキャノン, Giga Kyanon), the Giga Launcher (ギガランチャー, Giga Ranchā) rocket launcher, and/or the Giga Armor (ギガアーマー, Giga Aāmā) shield and perform the End Of World (エンドオブワールド, Endo Obu Wārudo) finisher alongside Magnugiga with the appropriate Advent Cards.

==== Shuichi Kitaoka ====
Shuichi Kitaoka (北岡 秀一, Kitaoka Shūichi) is a self-proclaimed "super-lawyer" who tends to only help someone if he has something to gain from them and was diagnosed with terminal cancer. With months left to live, he joins Shiro's Rider Fight as Kamen Rider Zolda with the hopes of achieving immortality and continuing his extravagant lifestyle. However, his condition leaves him vulnerable to fainting spells and dizziness, which eventually forces him to ask his secretary and bodyguard, Goro Yura, to take his place as Zolda during the Rider Fight's final stages.

In an alternate ending depicted in the film Kamen Rider Ryuki: Episode Final, Kitaoka forfeits the Rider Fight due to his declining health.

During the events of the crossover film Kamen Rider × Super Sentai: Ultra Super Hero Taisen, the Game World version of Kitaoka temporarily assumes the form of Midorider (ミドライダー, Midoraidā) where he commands the Gokaigers' Gokai Galleon.

Shuichi Kitaoka is portrayed by Ryohei (涼平, Ryōhei).

==== Goro Yura ====
Goro Yura (由良 吾郎, Yura Gorō) is Kitaoka's loyal secretary, bodyguard, and a former client of his who is highly skilled with household work and hand-to-hand combat. Aware of Kitaoka's activities as Kamen Rider Zolda, Goro assists him as much as possible. Due to Kitaoka's cancer, Goro takes over as Zolda to face Takeshi Asakura, dying in the process before Shiro reverses the Rider Fight's events.

Goro Yura is portrayed by Tomohisa Yuge (弓削 智久, Yuge Tomohisa).

=== Takeshi Asakura ===
Takeshi Asakura (浅倉 威, Asakura Takeshi) is a sadistic, cruel, bloodthirsty, arrogant, and bad-tempered criminal with a reputation for loving the act of fighting and killing during his fits of rage after he murdered his entire family as a child. After being represented by Kitaoka, who ensured Asakura would remain in prison, the latter joined Shiro's Rider Fight to satisfy his destructive nature and formed a contract with the cobra-themed Venosnaker (ベノスネーカー, Benosunēkā) Mirror Monster, becoming Kamen Rider Ouja (仮面ライダー王蛇, Kamen Raidā Ōja). With his newfound powers, Asakura breaks out of jail to seek revenge on Kitaoka upon learning of the latter's participation in the Rider Fight. After receiving Ren's help in faking his death to stop the police from interfering with his activities, Asakura kills Kamen Riders Raia and Gai and takes their Contract Monsters as his own. However, the police eventually learn the truth, forcing Asakura to settle his grudge against Kitaoka in a final battle, only to learn his opponent had switched places with Goro Yura, leaving the criminal in disarray over being denied the thing he wanted most before the police kill him. After Shiro reverses the Rider Fight, revives the participants, and erases their memories of it, Asakura escapes from prison and goes into hiding.

During the events of the web series Kamen Rider Outsiders, Asakura became a hired thug for a corrupt politician before he was betrayed and accepts Kamen Rider Odin's offer to participate in a new Rider Fight to evade arrest, which restores his memories in the process. Asakura subsequently kills his former employer and wins the Rider Fight before learning of Zein from Kamen Rider Diend and developing an interest in the former.

In an alternate ending depicted in the film Kamen Rider Ryuki: Episode Final, Asakura battles Kamen Rider Femme, who seeks revenge on him for her older sister's murder, before he loses Genocider to Kamen Rider Ryuga and Femme destroys his Card Deck, leaving Asakura to dissolve in the Mirror World. In the web special Kamen Rider Brave: Survive! The Revived Beast Rider Squad, Foundation X revives this version of Asakura in an artificial body.

As Kamen Rider Ouja, Asakura wields the Veno Visor (ベノバイザー, Beno Baizā) scepter, which allows him to summon Venosnaker and/or the Veno Saber (ベノサーベル, Beno Seibā) and perform the Veno Crash (ベノクラッシュ, Beno Kurasshu) finisher alongside Venosnaker with the appropriate Advent Cards. After killing Miyuki Tezuka and Jun Shibaura, he gains access to their Advent Cards and can fuse their respective Contract Monsters Evildiver and Metalgelas with Venosnaker to create the chimeric Genocider (ジェノサイダー, Jenosaidā), which allows him to perform the Doomsday (ドゥームズデイ, Dūmuzudei) finisher alongside it.

In Kamen Rider Outsiders, Asakura utilizes Kamen Rider Odin's Survive Mugen card to transform into his final form, Kamen Rider Ouja Survive (仮面ライダー王蛇サバイブ, Kamen Raidā Ōja Sabaibu), and evolve Venosnaker into a stronger form. While transformed, he wields the Veno Visor Zwei (ベノバイザーツバイ, Beno Baizā Tsubai), which can switch between its firearm and sword modes. He can also reconfigure Venosnaker into Bike Mode, which allows him to perform the Infinite Dead End (無限のデッドエンド, Mugen no Deddo Endo) finisher.

Takeshi Asakura is portrayed by Takashi Hagino (萩野 崇, Hagino Takashi).

== Recurring characters ==
=== ORE Journal ===
ORE Journal (OREジャーナル, Ore Jānaru; Open Resource Evolution) is an online journal resource where Shinji worked as a journalist trainee.

- Daisuke Okubo (大久保 大介, Ōkubo Daisuke): The editor and Shinji's boss at the ORE Journal. Daisuke Okubo is portrayed by Kanji Tsuda (津田 寛治, Tsuda Kanji).
- Reiko Momoi (桃井 令子, Momoi Reiko): A no-nonsense journalist whose goal is to uncover the truth behind the disappearances linked to the Rider Fight and the target of Shuichi's unwanted affections. Reiko Momoi is portrayed by Sayaka Kuon (久遠 さやか, Kuon Sayaka).
- Nanako Shimada (島田 奈々子, Shimada Nanako): A systems operator for the ORE Journal. Nanako Shimada is portrayed by Hitomi Kurihara (栗原 瞳, Kurihara Hitomi).
- Megumi Asano (浅野 めぐみ, Asano Megumi): Shuichi's strong yet clumsy former secretary who is later hired as a journalist for ORE Journal. Megumi Asano is portrayed by Chisato Morishita (森下 千里, Morishita Chisato).

=== Sanako Kanzaki ===
Sanako Kanzaki (神崎 沙奈子, Kanzaki Sanako) is Shiro and Yui's aunt and owner of the Atori (花鶏) coffee shop who considers herself a wise woman, claiming that her intuition is never wrong.

Sanako Kanzaki is portrayed by Kazue Tsunogae (角替 和枝, Tsunogae Kazue).

=== Miyuki Tezuka ===
Miyuki Tezuka (手塚 海之, Tezuka Miyuki) is a mysterious and enigmatic fortune teller who believes in predestination. While he was not originally chosen to take part in Shiro's Rider Fight, he did so after his pianist friend Yuichi Saito (斉藤 雄一, Saitō Yūichi) was attacked by Asakura, declined Shiro's offer, and devoured by a Mirror Monster. Forming a contract with the stingray-themed Evildiver (エビルダイバー, Ebirudaibā) Mirror Monster and becoming Kamen Rider Raia (仮面ライダーライア, Kamen Raidā Raia), Tezuka seeks to avenge Yuichi by ending the Rider Fight, joining forces with Shinji and Ren in the process. After receiving the Survive Shippu card from Shiro and passing it to Ren, Tezuka foresees Shinji's death at Asakura's hands. Choosing to defy fate, Tezuka sacrifices himself to save Shinji, taking the fatal blow meant for him in his place. After Shiro reverses the Rider Fight's events during the series finale, Tezuka is revived with no memory of his participation in it.

In an alternate timeline depicted in Kamen Rider Ryuki Special: 13 Riders, Tezuka joined the Rider Fight to help his former lover, Eri Ogawa, but is killed by Kamen Rider Verde.

As Kamen Rider Raia, Tezuka is equipped with the left forearm-mounted Evil Visor (エビルバイザー, Ebiru Baizā) buckler, which allows him to summon Evildiver, the Evil Whip (エビルウィップ, Ebiru Wippu), and/or copies of the other Riders' weapons and perform the Hide Venom (ハイドベノン, Haido Benon) finisher alongside Evildiver with the appropriate Advent Cards.

Miyuki Tezuka is portrayed by Hassei Takano (高野 八誠, Takano Hassei).

=== Jun Shibaura ===
Jun Shibaura (芝浦 淳, Shibaura Jun) is an arrogant and manipulative second-year college student at Meirin University, member of the school's Matrix gaming club, and son of a company president who is well-versed in computers and programming. Seeing everyone around him as pawns he can toy with to amuse himself, Shibaura joins the Rider Fight simply to win it, forming a contract with the anthropomorphic rhinoceros-themed Metalgelas (メタルゲラス, Metarugerasu) Mirror Monster and becoming Kamen Rider Gai (仮面ライダーガイ, Kamen Raidā Gai) in the process. Following a failed attempt at taking over the ORE Journal and serving jail time before his father and Kitaoka bail him out, Shibaura learns Kamen Riders Ryuki, Knight, and Raia's identities and invites them to a party in the hopes of killing them. However, they get caught in a battle between Kamen Riders Zolda and Ouja, with the latter using Shibaura as a human shield to survive Zolda's finishing attack, killing Shibaura.

In an alternate timeline depicted in Kamen Rider Ryuki Special: 13 Riders, Shibaura conspires with Kamen Rider Verde to kill Ryuki, only to be attacked by Kamen Rider Odin and devoured by a Mirror Monster.

As Kamen Rider Gai, Shibaura is equipped with the left shoulder-mounted Metal Visor (メタルバイザー, Metaru Baizā), which allows him to summon Metalgelas and/or the Metal Horn (メタルホーン, Metaru Hōn) gauntlet and perform the Heavy Pressure (ヘビープレッシャー, Hebī Puresshā) finisher alongside Metalgelas with the appropriate Advent Cards.

Jun Shibaura is portrayed by Satoshi Ichijo (一條 俊, Ichijō Satoshi).

=== Kamen Rider Odin ===
Kamen Rider Odin (仮面ライダーオーディン, Kamen Raidā Ōdin) is a mysterious golden entity and sentient Card Deck who serves as Shiro's representative in the Rider Fight, aided by the phoenix-themed Goldphoenix (ゴルトフェニックス, Gorutofenikkusu) Mirror Monster, and Yui's guardian via host bodies. Throughout the Rider Fight, Odin makes brief appearances to fight the other Kamen Riders until he and Knight are left. Following a climactic battle, Odin disappears after Shiro sees the pointlessness of the Rider Fight upon Yui's death.

During the events of the web series Rider Time: Kamen Rider Ryuki, Odin resurfaced in a new host to commence a new Rider Fight through Tatsuya Kanō and his grievously injured girlfriend Sara in an attempt to revive Yui. Once Tatsuya is defeated by Kamen Rider Zi-O, Odin makes his presence known while using the Survive (サバイブ, Sabaibu) cards to overpower him and Kamen Rider Geiz before they use the Ryuki and Knight Ride Watches to negate his invincibility and defeat him, allowing Zi-O to negate the events. Nonetheless, Odin returns during the events of the web series Kamen Rider Outsiders to recruit Asakura, among others, for another Rider Fight, only to be defeated by Asakura while Kamen Rider Diend steals his Card Deck.

In battle, Odin wields the Gold Visor (ゴールドバイザー, Gōrudo Baizā) scepter, which allows him to summon Goldphoenix, the twin Gold Sabers (ゴルトセイバー, Goruto Seibā), and/or the Gold Shield (ゴルトシールド, Goruto Shīrudo), reverse the flow of time, and perform the Eternal Chaos (エターナルカオス, Etānaru Kaosu) finisher alongside Goldphoenix with the appropriate Advent Cards. He can also teleport short distances, produce golden feathery gusts, and possesses the Survive Mugen (サバイブ無限, Sabaibu Mugen; Survive Infinite) card, which renders him invincible when used in conjunction with the Survive Shippu and Rekka cards.

Kamen Rider Odin is voiced by Tsuyoshi Koyama (小山 剛志, Koyama Tsuyoshi), who also voices the 13 Riders' Visors.

=== Satoru Tojo ===
Satoru Tojo (東條 悟, Tōjō Satoru) is a bloodthirsty and mentally unstable social outcast who developed hero syndrome and will do whatever it takes to be accepted, going as far as to kill his loved ones under the belief that the resulting grief will make him stronger. After joining the Rider Fight, forming a contract with the anthropomorphic white tiger-themed Destwilder (デストワイルダー, Desutowairudā) Mirror Monster, and becoming Kamen Rider Tiger (仮面ライダータイガ, Kamen Raidā Taiga), Tojo initially aids his teacher Hideyuki Kagawa in closing the Mirror World before killing him in a twisted attempt at vindicating Kagawa's ideals about heroism. However, Tojo fell into a downward spiral of contradictions throughout the Rider Fight until he witnesses a father and son, who reminded Tojo of Kagawa and his own child, and sacrifices himself to save them from a vehicular accident. The next day, the newspaper would run the story of Tojo's deed, labeling him a hero. After Shiro reverses the Rider Fight's events, Tojo is revived with no memory of it.

As Kamen Rider Tiger, Tojo wields the Dest Visor (デストバイザー, Desuto Baizā) battle axe, which allows him to summon Destwilder and/or a pair of Dest Claw (デストクロー, Desuto Kurō) gauntlets and perform the Crystal Break (クリスタルブレイク, Kurisutaru Bureiku) finisher alongside Destwilder with the appropriate Advent Cards.

Satoru Tojo is portrayed by Jun Takatsuki (高槻 純, Takatsuki Jun).

=== Mitsuru Sano ===
Mitsuru Sano (佐野 満, Sano Mitsuru) is the son of a wealthy businessman, who sent him out into the world to learn about life's hardships to avoid spoiling him with an affluent upbringing. As a result, Sano became a parking garage worker who cleans cars for other wealthy individuals and developed the belief that friendship, respect, and love could be bought. As a result, he joined the Rider Fight, formed a contract with the anthropomorphic gazelle-themed Gigazelle (ギガゼール, Gigazēru) Mirror Monster, and became Kamen Rider Imperer (仮面ライダーインペラー, Kamen Raidā Inperā) to live a rich and happy life. To achieve his goal, he becomes a mercenary, attempting to sell his strength to his fellow competitors. After attaining his father's inheritance and losing his reason to fight however, Sano discovers he cannot back out of the Rider Fight and attempts to buy the other Riders' services in the hopes that they will fight for him. This leads to him forming an alliance with Tojo, who eventually and literally backstabs him and leaves him for dead before Kamen Rider Ouja destroys his Card Deck, leaving Sano to dissolve in the Mirror World.

As Kamen Rider Imperer, Sano is equipped with the right knee-mounted Gazelle Visor (ガゼルバイザー, Gazeru Baizā), which allows him to summon Gigazelle and/or the twin drill-like Gazelle Stab (ガゼルスタッブ, Gazeru Sutabbu) gauntlet and perform the Drive Divider (ドライブディバイダー, Doraibu Dibaidā) finisher alongside Gigazelle with the appropriate Advent Cards. Unlike the other Riders' Contract Monsters, Gigazelle exists in herds and is often accompanied by other Zelle (ゼール, Zēru) subspecies, such as Megazelle (メガゼール, Megazēru), Negazelle (ネガゼール, Negazēru), Omegazelle (オメガゼール, Omegazēru), and Magazelle (マガゼール, Magazēru); all of which retain their feral nature despite Sano's contract with Gigazelle and often attack him as such.

Mitsuru Sano is portrayed by Takashi Hyuga (日向 崇, Hyūga Takashi).

=== Alternatives ===
The Alternatives (オルタナティブ, Orutanatibu) are a pair of Pseudo-Riders (擬似ライダー, Giji Raidā) created by Hideyuki Kagawa, based on Shiro's blueprints for the 13 Kamen Riders, and aided by the anthropomorphic cricket-themed Psyco-Rogue (サイコローグ, Saikorōgu) Mirror Monster who seek to close the Mirror World. Following the Alternatives' deaths, Psyco-Rogue is destroyed by Kamen Rider Knight.

Unlike the Riders, the Alternatives utilize altered V-Buckles and Card Decks to transform. While transformed, they are equipped with the Slash Visor (スラッシュバイザー, Surasshu Baizā) bracelet, which allows them to summon Psyco-Rogue and/or the Slash Dagger (スラッシュダッガー, Surasshu Daggā) sword, transform Psyco-Rogue into the Psycoroader (サイコローダー, Saikorōdā) motorcycle, and perform the Dead End (デッドエンド, Deddo Endo) finisher alongside Psyco-Rogue with the appropriate Advent Cards.

- Hajime Nakamura (仲村 創, Nakamura Hajime): A graduate student at Seimeiin University who originally worked under Hitoshi Ejima, though Nakamura was sick the day Ejima and Shiro began their Mirror World-related experiments. Upon learning of what happened, Nakamura developed a grudge against the Kanzakis, studiously evaded questions related to them and Ejima, and eventually joined Hideyuki Kagawa in his effort to stop the Rider Fight as the primary Alternative. However, Nakamura is killed by Tojo, who discovered the former only sought to stop the Rider Fight for vengeful reasons. Hajime Nakamura is portrayed by Junichi Mizuno (水野 純一, Mizuno Jun'ichi).
- Hideyuki Kagawa (香川 英行, Kagawa Hideyuki): A professor at Seimeiin University who discovered Shiro's notes on the latter's Mirror World experiments. Realizing how dangerous it was and despite not fully understanding it himself, the former used his photographic memory to duplicate the latter's work and develop the Alternative technology in an effort to close the Mirror World. Kagawa also recruited Tojo and Nakamura to help him further, becoming the prototypical Alternative Zero (オルタナティブ・ゼロ, Orutanatibu Zero) along the way. However, he is killed by Tojo due to the latter's hero syndrome. Hideyuki Kagawa is portrayed by Satoshi Jinbo (神保 悟志, Jinbo Satoshi).

== Guest characters ==
- Koichi Sakakibara (榊原 耕一, Sakakibara Kōichi): A young man and intended participant of the Rider Fight who lived in the apartment where Shinji became Kamen Rider Ryuki and was eaten by Dragreder prior to the series' beginning. In an alternate timeline depicted in Kamen Rider Ryuki Special: 13 Riders, Sakakibara was Shinji's predecessor as Ryuki before passing his Card Deck to him and dissolving in the Mirror World. Koichi Sakakibara is portrayed by Keiichi Wada (和田 圭市, Wada Keiichi).
- Eri Ogawa (小川 恵里, Ogawa Eri): Ren's fiancé who ended up hospitalized and in a coma after being attacked by Darkwing. Eri Ogawa is portrayed by Mahiru Tsubura (つぶら まひる, Tsubura Mahiru).
- Masashi Sudo (須藤 雅史, Sudō Masashi): A corrupt police officer who uses his job to cover his illegal activities and eliminate witnesses to his crimes. After killing his partner and antique shop owner Tomoyuki Kaga (加賀 友之, Kaga Tomoyuki) for demanding a larger cut from his profits, Sudo was approached by Shiro and offered to participate in the Rider Fight. Gladly accepting, he formed a contract with the anthropomorphic crab-themed Volcancer (ボルキャンサー, Borukyansā) and became Kamen Rider Scissors (仮面ライダーシザース, Kamen Raidā Shizāzu) to better facilitate his crimes by feeding his victims to his Contract Monster. As Kamen Rider Scissors, he is equipped with the left forearm-mounted Scissors Visor (シザースバイザー, Shizāsu Baizā) shears, which allows him to summon Volcancer, the Scissors Pinch (シザースピンチ, Shizāsu Pinchi) gauntlet, and/or the Shell Defense (シェルディフェンス, Sheru Difensu) shield and perform the Scissors Attack (シザースアタック, Shizāsu Attaku) finisher alongside Volcancer with the appropriate Advent Cards. In the present, he hospitalizes Reiko Momoi after she starts investigating Kaga's shop. When Shinji is assigned to the case, he tries to befriend Sudo, believing he is Kaga, and inadvertently reveals personal details about himself and his allies. Using this information, Sudo attempts to kill his competitors and kidnap Yui to gain leverage over Shiro, but Ren realizes Sudo's true identity and damages his Card Deck. With the contract null and void, Volcancer turns on Sudo, devouring him like it did his victims. In an alternate timeline depicted in Kamen Rider Ryuki Special: 13 Riders, Sudo conspires with Kamen Rider Verde to kill Shinji, only to be killed by Kamen Rider Ouja. Masashi Sudo is portrayed by Takeshi Kimura (木村 剛, Kimura Takeshi).
- Hitoshi Ejima (江島 均, Ejima Hitoshi): A former professor at Seimeiin University who helped Shiro perform the experiment that resulted in Eri Ogawa's coma. Following this, Ejima left his job and wandered the city with a Seal Card to protect himself from the Mirror Monsters. After losing the card, he returns to his lab to beg for Shiro's help, only to die of a heart attack upon seeing Yui. Hitoshi Ejima is portrayed by Senzaburo Makimura (牧村 泉三郎, Makimura Senzaburō).

== Spin-off characters ==
=== Fake Agito ===
Fake Kamen Rider Agito (偽仮仮面ライダーアギト, Nise Kamen Raidā Agito) is an evil copy of Kamen Rider Agito's Burning Form who appears exclusively in the Hyper Battle Video special Kamen Rider Ryuki: Ryuki vs Kamen Rider Agito. In an effort to become the ruler of the "Miracle World", he gathers several Mirror Monsters to defeat Kamen Rider Ryuki, only to be defeated by him and Agito.

The Fake Agito is voiced by Koji Yusa (遊佐 浩二, Yusa Kōji)).

=== Miho Kirishima ===
Miho Kirishima (霧島 美穂, Kirishima Miho) is a young con artist who seduces wealthy men to steal their valuables and appears exclusively in the film Kamen Rider Ryuki: Episode Final. She joins the Rider Fight to resurrect her sister and take revenge on her killer, Asakura, forming a contract with the swan-themed Blancwing (ブランウイング, Buran'uingu) Mirror Monster to become Kamen Rider Femme (仮面ライダーファム, Kamen Raidā Famu) and falling in love with Shinji in the process. While she succeeds in defeating Asakura, she is ultimately killed by Mirror Shinji.

As Kamen Rider Femme, Kirishima wields the Blanc Visor (ブランバイザー, Buran Baizā) rapier, which allows her to summon Blancwing, the double-bladed Wing Slasher (ウイングスラッシャー, Wingu Surasshā) staff, and/or the Wing Shield (ウイングシールド, Wingu Shīrudo), the latter of which grants the ability to produce white feathery gusts and teleport short distances, and perform the Misty Slash (ミスティースラッシュ, Misutī Surasshu) finisher alongside Blancwing with the appropriate Advent Cards.

Miho Kirishima is portrayed by Natsuki Katō (加藤 夏希, Katō Natsuki).

=== Mirror Shinji ===
"Mirror Shinji Kido" (鏡像の城戸 真司, Kyōzō no Kido Shinji) is Shinji's Mirror World doppelganger who appears exclusively in the film Kamen Rider Ryuki: Episode Final. As a child, Yui met and befriended Shinji, but was seemingly abandoned by him, which led to her unconsciously creating a Mirror World version of him. Similarly to humans and the Mirror World, Mirror Shinji cannot survive in the real world without disintegrating. In the present, he joins the Rider Fight as Kamen Rider Ryuga (仮面ライダーリュウガ, Kamen Raidā Ryūga), aided by the Chinese dragon-themed Dragblacker (ドラグブラッカー, Doraguburakkā) Mirror Monster, to become a real person. To achieve his goal, Mirror Shinji absorbs the original, but Shinji forces him out and fights back, eventually killing his doppelganger.

As Kamen Rider Ryuga, Mirror Shinji is equipped with the Black Drag Visor (ブラックドラグバイザー, Burakku Doragu Baizā) gauntlet, which allows him to summon Dragblacker and/or dark copies of Ryuki's weapons and perform the Dragon Rider Kick alongside Dragblacker with the appropriate Advent Cards.

Mirror Shinji Kido is portrayed by Takamasa Suga, who also portrays the original Shinji Kido.

=== Itsuro Takamizawa ===
Itsuro Takamizawa (高見沢 逸郎, Takamizawa Itsurō) is a rich and charismatic businessman of the Takamizawa Group who appears exclusively in an alternate timeline depicted in Kamen Rider Ryuki Special: 13 Riders. Having joined the Rider Fight to expand his wealth further and formed a contract with the anthropomorphic chameleon-themed Biogreeza (バイオグリーザ, Baiogurīza) Mirror Monster to become Kamen Rider Verde (仮面ライダーベルデ, Kamen Raidā Berude), he conspires with several of his fellow competitors to kill Shinji. After killing Kamen Rider Raia, Takamizawa is killed in turn by Kamen Rider Knight.

As Kamen Rider Verde, Takamizawa is equipped with the left thigh-mounted Bio Visor (バイオバイザー, Baio Baizā), which allows him to summon Biogreeza and/or the Bio Winder (バイオワインダー, Baio Waindā) yo-yo, turn invisible, assume the form of other Riders, and perform the Death Punish (デスパニッシュ, Desu Panisshu) finisher alongside Biogreeza with the appropriate Advent Cards.

Itsuro Takamizawa is portrayed by Arthur Kuroda (黒田 アーサー, Kuroda Āsā).
