= List of Kamen Rider MY-TH episodes =

This is a list of episodes for Kamen Rider MY-TH, a Japanese tokusatsu television drama. It is the eighth series in the franchise released in Japan's Reiwa Era and the 37th entry of Toei's long-running Kamen Rider series produced by TV Asahi, also commemorating the 55th anniversary of the franchise.

== Episodes ==
No.	Title	Directed by	Written by	Original release date
1	"The Mouse Meister and the Young Lady" (Note: TV Asahi's official summary uses "The Mouse! The Meister and the Young Lady" (子(ねずみ)！マイスターとお嬢様, Nezumi! Maisutā to Ojōsama).); Transliteration: "Nezumi Maisutā to Ojōsama" (Japanese: 子(ねずみ)マイスターとお嬢様)	Shojiro Nakazawa	Naruhisa Arakawa	September 6, 2026
100 years ago, during the Taishō era, Kamen Riders My-Th and Maou fight each other over the future of humanity's "hope." In the present day, a young man named Sora Otosumi works for his mistress, a high school girl named Yuna Mizuki, cooking her breakfast and taking her to school. Elsewhere, multiple members of the Zyunishi Doumei wake up and discuss that "Fukashigi" monsters are vanishing before they can get to them, making them wonder who is stealing their prey. After school, Yuna meets up again with Sora and the two investigate the latest "Fukashigi Incident," where couples have been snatched where they stood, and the culprit leaves only a red feather behind. Sora leaves Yuna behind and heads to the next spot where the winged Fukashigi monster shows up. Though Sora manages to save the next pair of victims, the monster instead kidnaps him and an annoying man next to him, considering them both a "couple." Sora lets the monster drag them both to its nest, where the other disappeared couples have been tied up in web for its food. Sora then manages to free himself and the annoying man, and straps on his My-Th Driver across his chest to transform into Kamen Rider My-Th, defeating the monster. Several days later, a tutor named Tatsuomi Asao comes to the Mizuki household to help Yuna's studies, but Sora notices that Tatsuomi is the same man he was stuck with from the previous incident.
2	"The Running Tortoise and Modern Hare"; Transliteration: "Modan Usagi to Hashiru Kame" (Japanese: モダンウサギと走るカメ)	Shojiro Nakazawa	Naruhisa Arakawa	September 13, 2026
Tatsuomi begins tutoring Yuna on her schoolwork while secretly acting as a spy for Kamuri, the leader of the Zyunishi Doumei, trying to find out if Sora is linked to the Kamen Rider My-Th from 100 years ago. When another sign of a Fukashigi appears in the city, Yuna and Sora leave the house to investigate, while Tatsuomi digs through the house. He finds out that Yuna and Sora both lost their parents in an accident and live alone together, but further "Top Secret" info on Sora is replaced with fancy cheeses that he likes. In the city, Sora finds out that a Fukashigi monster has disguised itself as a local florist, and fights it as My-Th. However, he runs into Kamen Rider Datt, who fights with him to defeat the same Fukashigi. Sora reveals an X-Eggs, inserting it into his My-Th Driver, that allows him to equip a Turtle Frame and overcome the Fukashigi's increasing attacks. Sora takes four X-Eggs from the Fukashigi's body but Datt steals two of them before disappearing. Back home, an old man gives Sora some more X-Eggs, and warns him about the Zyunishi Doumei.
3	"The Black Cat Rider of Righteousness"; Transliteration: "Seigi no Kuroneko Raidā nya" (Japanese: 正義の黒猫ライダーにゃ)	Ryuta Tasaki	Naruhisa Arakawa	September 20, 2026
Kamuri grants Tatsuomi the power to transform into Kamen Rider Rid, though another Zyunishi Doumei member, Tigre, puts him through a trial first. Meanwhile, Yuna comes across a girl in shock that a Fukashigi monster kidnapped her dad. Yuna and Sora investigate further and find her description of the incident similar to multiple disappearances of electrical workers around the area. Sora lures the Fukashigi out near a power transformer and transforms into My-Th to fight it. Tatsuomi enters the scene and transforms into the black cat form of Rid to fight both My-Th and the monster. Despite Rid supposedly destroying the Fukashigi, the monster reconstructs itself and runs away, leaving the mystery of the missing workers unsolved.
4	"There's More to a Wolf Than Meets the Eye"; Transliteration: "Ōkami ni wa Ura ga Aru" (Japanese: 狼には裏がある)	Ryuta Tasaki	Naruhisa Arakawa	September 27, 2026
A flashback shows Yuna and Sora surviving a car crash that took their parents when a mysterious attacker caused a bridge to fall on them. At that time, Sora grabbed the My-Th Driver and swore to protect Yuna, while an old man claimed that Yuna was humanity's hope. In the present, Sora and Yuna have a theory on how to beat the Fukashigi that revived itself. Sora uses Tatsuomi and then Rid to defeat the Fukashigi, cancelling its sonic blast and ripping out its heart with his Wolf Frame, then getting Yuna to catch the X-Eggs that spill from the split bodies. The next day, Tatsuomi is surprised to see the girl's missing father reappear, handing Sora a gift. Tatsuomi hands his borrowed driver back to Kamuri, who chides him for being unsuccessful against My-Th, and refuses to explain further. Afterwards, Tatsuomi returns to Yuna's house, offering to become an official advisor to her club.
5	"What Snakes or Dogs May Come"; Transliteration: "Inu ga Deru ka Ja ga Deru ka" (Japanese: 犬が出るか蛇が出るか)	Koichiro Hayama	Naruhisa Arakawa	October 4, 2026
Sora lets a deliveryman collect a package after accidentally switching the labels on two adjacent boxes. Sora realizes his mistake but is too late to stop the deliveryman from leaving with a box full of X-Eggs, which Sora insists are vital for Yuna, as he has not been able to collect more over the past month. Yuna invites both Sora and Tatsuomi to view the new club room for her Society of Fukashigi Incident Investigations, and Yuna shows them the latest case of a livestreamer attacked by a monster while touring an abandoned hospital. Sora and Tatsuomi go to follow up on the lead, and quickly find the Fukashigi. Sora tries to quickly kill the monster and take its X-Eggs, but he is interrupted by Kamen Rider Jyao, who wants to take the My-Th Driver to Kamuri. Before Jyao can finish off My-Th or the Fukashigi, the Fukashigi overheats and unleashes a huge explosion, but everyone escapes in the aftermath. Yuna lets Sora return to normal, but then falls unconscious on the floor of her house.
6	"Become an Eagle!"; Transliteration: "Washi-san ni Naare!" (Japanese: ワシさんになあれ！)	Koichiro Hayama	Naruhisa Arakawa	October 11, 2026
Sora spends hours analyzing Tatsuomi's footage of the battle with the Tsuno Fukashigi and Kamen Rider Jyao, and discovers that thanks to Jyao's electric attacks, the Fukashigi was able to evolve and create a plasma-like shield around itself while making its horn stronger. Sora tracks the Fukashigi to a chemical plant where it absorbs pure hydrogen peroxide to grow even stronger. Though still feeling weak, Yuna wakes up in time to allow Sora to transform back into Kamen Rider My-Th. Soon after, Jyao and Vanken appear on scene to fight the Fukashigi themselves. My-Th uses Jyao's arrogance to trick the Fukashigi into attacking them both, but finds he can't shatter the horn with My-Th's power alone. Vanken tries to attack the monster as well, only to be summarily beaten and stripped of his X-Eggs. My-Th grabs Vanken's dropped X-Eggs and uses it to give himself an Eagle Frame, and using a tank of liquid nitrogen, shatters the Fukashigi's horn and grabs the X-Eggs from its defeated body. Later, Sora uses an X-Eggs to heal Yuna, Mutn swears vengeance on My-Th for stealing Vanken's X-Eggs, and Kamuri consumes an X-Eggs' essence from his secret stash while planning to take action himself.
7	"The Hammer of the Angered Sheep"; Transliteration: "Ikareru Hitsuji no Tettsui" (Japanese: 怒れる羊の鉄槌)	Shojiro Nakazawa	Naruhisa Arakawa	October 18, 2026
8	"A Cornered Rat Will Bite a Cat"; Transliteration: "Kyūso Neko o Kamu" (Japanese: 窮鼠ネコをかむ)	Shojiro Nakazawa	Naruhisa Arakawa	October 25, 2026
9	"The Tiger Brother's Rigorous Training"; Transliteration: "Tora Niisan no Mō Tokkun" (Japanese: 虎兄さんの猛特訓)	Teruaki Sugihara	Naruhisa Arakawa	November 8, 2026
10	"Trial Orca!"; Transliteration: "Toraiaru Shachi!" (Japanese: トライアル・シャチ！)	Teruaki Sugihara	Naruhisa Arakawa	November 15, 2026
11	"The Dragon God Cometh at the White Tiger's Howl"; Transliteration: "Ryūjin Kitarite Byakko Hoyu" (Japanese: 龍神来りて白虎吼ゆ)	Ryuta Tasaki	Mari Takura	November 22, 2026
12	"Run, Qilin! Call Forth the Lightning"; Transliteration: "Kakero Kirin Yobeyo Inazuma" (Japanese: 駆けろ麒麟 呼べよ稲妻)	Ryuta Tasaki	Mari Takura	November 29, 2026
