= Choukou Senshi Changéríon =

- Genre: Tokusatsu; Superhero fiction Science fiction Action; Comedy-Drama
- Created by: Toei Company
- Written by: Toshiki Inoue
- Starring: Takashi Hagino; Mie Hayashi; Yuka Matsui; Kazunari Aizawa
- Narrated by: Noboru Ichiyama; Daiki Nakamura
- Opening theme: "OVER THE TIMES ~ Ima o Koete" by MISA
- Ending theme: "Hohoemi no Tabidachi" by Moku Honiden "Changéríon ~ Hikari no Mirai" by KAT
- Composer: Goro Yasukawa
- Country of origin: Japan
- No. of episodes: 39

Production
- Producers: Keisuke Iwata; Kyotaro Kimura; Susumu Yoshikawa; Shinichiro Shirakura
- Running time: 23-25 minutes per episode
- Production companies: TV Tokyo; Yomiko Advertising; Toei Company

Original release
- Network: TXN (TV Tokyo)
- Release: April 3 – December 25, 1996

Choukou Senshi Changéríon (超光戦士シャンゼリオン, Chōkō Senshi Shanzerion; translated as Super Shining Soldier Changéríon) is a tokusatsu series created by Toei Company. The series aired from April 3, 1996, to December 25, 1996. It was originally planned to run for a full 52 episodes before being cut down to 39 due to low ratings.

However, the show has since become a classic, viewed as legendary by some outlets.

== Plot ==
The DarkZide stealthily appeared on Earth from their dying world in Dark Dimension to acquire the Larmu, human life-energy, to continue their existence. To counter the threat, Takeshi Munakata of the Cabinet Secret Service established the group SAIDOC to intercept the DarkZide. SAIDOC developed the Crystal Power needed to complete the Changérion project. However, the power was accidentally transferred into the body of detective Akira Suzumura.

== Characters ==
=== Suzumura Detective Agency ===
- Akira Suzumura (涼村 暁, Suzumara Akira) / Changéríon (シャンゼリオン, Shanzerion): A happy-go-lucky, frivolous PI who ended up with the Crystal Power. His favorite food is banana parfait. He has a vast debt and loves women and gambling.
- Akemi Tachibana (橘 朱美, Tachibana Akemi) (1-14): Akira's aid and supposed girlfriend. She eventually left Suzumura to be a kindergarten teacher.
- Rui Kiribara (桐原 るい, Kiribara Rui) (18-36) Akira's new aid. Her capability as a detective is higher than Akira's. Rui is the daughter of a big zaibatsu, and her real name is Reika Ayanokouji (綾乃小路 麗華, Ayanokōji Reika).

=== SAIDOC ===
- Takeshi Munakata (宗方 猛, Munakata Takeshi): Chief of SAIDOC. He is anguished that the government doesn't believe DarkZide exists. Especially, he is afflicted by financial problems, and SAIDOC's development fund is supported by his own property.
- Katsuhiko Hayami (速水 克彦, Hayami Katsuhiko) / The Blader (ザ・ブレイダー, Za Bureidā): The SAIDOC member originally meant to have the Crystal power. He is a serious, strait-laced man in contrast with Akira, and his sense of duty is very strong. He feels a bit of animosity towards Akira for stealing his thunder. Later in the series he gains the ability to transform himself into the Blader when he eats the "Seed of Darkness" in the form of an umeboshi. However, he reverts back when the umeboshi is digested in his stomach, and his memory of the time during the transformation disappears.
- Eri Minami: The only female SAIDOC member. A brave, willful & confident woman. She falls in love with Kuroiwa (Gauzar).

=== DarkZide ===
- Queen Eriza (女王エリーザ, Joō Erīza; 39): Queen of the DarkZide in Parallel world.
- The Sacred Cadres of the DarkZide
  - Dark General Zander (闇将軍ザンダー, Yami Shōgun Zandā): A muscular demon who assumed the guise of Kazuki Katayama (片桐 一樹, Katayama Kazuki)
  - Doctor Vinsue (博士ヴィンスー, Hakase Winsū): A toad-like demon.
  - Priest Mordos (神官モードス, Shinkan Mōdosu): A tree-like demon who possesses the Key Bird. Mordos is the calm one of the 3 Cadres.
- Dark Knight Gauzar (暗黒騎士ガウザー, Ankoku Kishi Gauzā): A rogue DarkZide. He assumes the human identity of Shogo Kuroiwa (黒岩 省吾, Kuroiwa Shogo).
- Zapphire (ザファイア, Zafaia): She assumes the human identity of Sayoko (小夜子, Sayoko).

==== DarkZide Monsters ====
- Gingar (01): Posed as Izumi, an elementary school teacher, kidnapping children to use their lifeforce to resurrect Sacred Cadres. Though killed, she succeeded in reawakening her masters.
- Shoeser (02): Posing as a lady's shoe salesman, he kidnapped his victims through the shoes he sold to them.
- Jatou (03): Abducts brides.
- Miraiza (04): A mummy-like monster who posed as the driver of a paper recycling truck. He was the first to be defeated by the Choukou Kishi.
- Elegis (05)
- Dachura (06)
- Maniya (07)
- Rangoria (08)
- Bashiza (09)
- Vakurina (10): A vacuum cleaner-like monster who disguised itself as a maid and takes victims through the vacuum on its hand.
- Shuranza (11)
- Insurar (13): A long-eared monster who posed as a life insurance agent, taking lifeforce through the plush rabbits it handed out.
- Shiragar (14)
- Dogotch (15): A hammer-themed monster who was obsessed with collecting chopstick holders.
- Ghameleo (16)
- Dark Noble Destar (17-18)
- Dark Demon Iceler (18)
- Irezuma (19)
- Miminga (21)
- Batanza (22)
- Buroda (25)
- Deringa (26)
- Getora (27)
- Meganos (28)
- Bochakka (29)
- Gohatto (30)
- Jabu (31)
- Guluris (32)
- Fondar (33)
- Hagan (37)
- Glokkar (38)

== Episodes ==
1. A Hero!! Me? (ヒーロー！！俺？, Hīrō!! Ore?)
2. Twinkle, Twinkle, my Light Brain (ノーテンキラキラ, Nōten Kirakira)
3. A Lot of Brides (花嫁ゾロゾロ, Hanayome Zorozoro)
4. Ah friendship, Ah Cruelty (ああ友情 ああ無情, Aa Yūjō, Aa Mujō)
5. He is the Culprit! (犯人は誰だ！, Hannin wa Dare da!)
6. Sorry, Jiro (ごめんね、ジロウ, Gomen ne, Jirō)
7. Idol!! Me? (アイドル！！私？, Aidoru!! Watashi?)
8. Daughter, Pick a Man!! (娘よ、男は選べ！！, Musume yo, Otoko wa Erabe!!)
9. Hayami, Radiant! (速水、燦然！, Hayami, Sanzen!)
10. Not Mackerel! (サバじゃねぇ！, Saba Ja nee!)
11. Save the Konjac (コンニャク残して, Konnyaku Nokoshite)
12. Mr. Daruma Fallen (ダルマさん転んだ, Darumasan Koron da)
13. Rose and Sunflower (バラとひまわり, Bara to Himawari)
14. Farewell, Akemi (サヨナラ、朱美, Sayonara, Akemi)
15. The Super-Rare What? (超まぼろしのアレ, Chōmaboroshi no Are)
16. Part-Time with Kiriko! (バイトで霧子！, Baito de Kiriko!)
17. Full Rivals (ライバルいっぱい, Raibaru Ippai)
18. Further Rivals (さらなるライバル, Saranara Raibaru)
19. Your Daughter, this Abnormality (ご令嬢、これ異常, Goreijō, Kore Ijō)
20. Hero!! Huh? Changéríon 133 Days of Fighting (ヒーロー！！あれ？シャンゼリオン 激闘の１３３日, Hīrō!! Are? Shanzerion Gekitō no 133 Nichi)
21. Reliving Unrequited Love (モーレツに片思い, Mōretsu ni Kataomoi)
22. Phantom Gold Reserves! (幻の埋蔵金！, Maboroshi no Maizō Kin!)
23. Mysterious Dark Courtroom! (ナゾの闇法廷！, Nazo no Yami Hyōtei!)
24. Life's Worst Flirt (人生最悪のナンパ, Jinsei Saiaku no Nanpa)
25. Phantom Thief Kuroageha! (怪盗クロアゲハ！, Kaitō Kuroageha!)
26. Black Knight, Arrives! (闇の騎士、出馬！, Yami no Kishi, Shutsuba!)
27. Akemi Returns! (朱美リターンズ！, Akemi Ritānzu!)
28. Dog and Cat and Horse and Deer (犬と猫と馬と鹿, Inu to Neko to Uma to Shika)
29. Hayami is a Criminal! (速水はヤミに！, Hayami wa Yami ni!)
30. A Hero's Teacher! (ヒーローの先生！, Hīrō no Sensei!)
31. Sheep and Pie and Money and (羊とパイと現金と, Hitsuji to Pai to Genkin to)
32. The Second Soldier Arrives! (第２の戦士現る！, Daini no Senshi Arawaru!)
33. Not Mackerel! 2 (サバじゃねぇ！２, Saba Ja nee! 2)
34. Is it Friendship? (友情ええやないか, Yūjō Ee Yanai ka)
35. Cursing Woman and Helping Woman (呪う女と救いの女, Norō Onna to Sukui no Onna)
36. A New Enemy?! (新たなる敵！か？, Arata naru Teki! ka?)
37. Baketake Before the Storm (嵐の前のバケタケ, Arashi no Mae no Baketake)
38. Held the Emperor (皇帝の握ったもの, Kōtei no Nigitta Mono)
39. Over the Times… (時（いま）を越えて…, Ima o Koete…)

== Cast ==
- Akira Suzumura/Changéríon - Takashi Hagino
- Akemi Tachibana - Mie Hayashi
- Rui Kirihara - Yuka Matsui
- Katsuhiko Hayami/Blader - Kazunari Aizawa
- Eri Minami - Chika Kochihira
- Takeshi Munakata - Noboru Ichiyama
- Shogo Kuroiwa/Gawer - Atsushi Ogawa
- Dark General Zander (Voice) - Ryūzaburō Ōtomo
- Doctor Vinsue (Voice) - Tomoyuki Terai
- Priest Mordos (Voice) - Toshimichi Takahashi
- Kazuki Katagiri - Yutaka Hirose
- Sayoko - Ayami Endō
- Eureka - Mieko Kinoshita
- Narration - Noboru Ichiyama, Daiki Nakamura

Suit actor

- Changéríon - Jiro Okamoto

== Songs ==
Opening themes

1. "OVER THE TIMES ~ Ima o Koete" (OVER THE TIMES～時（いま）を越えて) by MISA
2. "OVER THE TIMES (English Version)" by MISA

Ending themes

1. "Hohoemi no Tabidachi" (微笑みの出発（たびだち）; "Traveler's Smile") by Moku Hon'iden (本位田 牧, Hon'iden Moku)
2. "Changéríon ~ Hikari no Mirai" (シャンゼリオン～光りの未来, Shanzerion ~ Hikari no Mirai; "Changéríon ~ Shining Future") by KAT

== International Broadcasts ==
- In the Philippines, it was aired on ABS-CBN from 1998 to 1999 with a Tagalog dub under the title of Changerion.
