= Specter (2005 film) =

- Directed by: Junya Okabe
- Written by: Junya Okabe
- Music by: Yasunori Mitsuda; Kazumi Mitome
- Distributed by: Konami
- Release date: July 9, 2005
- Running time: 41 min.
- Languages: Japanese; English (dubbed)

Specter (スペクター, Supekutā) is the first tokusatsu short film created by Konami. The film itself made its appearance in conventions and shows to promote the film of 2005. The movie itself never made international release, but found its way through the internet. During display shows the "Specter" motorbike as well as the "Specter" Turbo Suit was featured. The effects of the film were done by Buildup Co., the same effects company that did the 1998 mecha tokusatsu, Dark Soldier D.

== Plot ==
Japan D.O.E. Agent, Tetsuya Terasaki, having just completed a difficult hunt for a fugitive alien, is ordered to investigate a local alien disturbance. Expecting resistance, he has his SPECTER armor sent to him. Arriving at the site, he finds aliens torturing two scientists, trying to extract information from them. He fights off the aliens and powers down to make a report to Command.

While Terasaki checks in with headquarters, one of the scientists accidentally activates a device on the dead alien. The device resurrects the alien and enhance its powers. He kills one scientist and kidnaps the other. Tetsuya chases after them as the alien takes the scientist down into tunnel and towards his spaceship. Tetsuya follows the pair and recovers the scientist. The alien no longer needs the hostage, though, as he has his ship to eliminate Tetsuya. Tetsuya attempts to destroy the ship with his guns, but it's too well armed.

The D.O.E. commander sends down a particle cannon to help Tetsuya win. After Tetsuya fires it, he grabs the scientists and they make their way to the surface out of the tunnel, when suddenly Tetsuya realizes the alien is still alive. He shoots the alien one more time and gets the scientist to safety. Once back in civilization, the scientist demands an explanation for everything, but Tetsuya erases her memories. Afterwards Tetsuya travels home for a well-deserved rest, despite an alien "crab" attacking the US. His commander tells him to let the US Division handle it.

== Cast ==
- Shinji Kasahara as Tetsuya Teresaki
- Show Aikawa as Captain
- Hitomi Kurihara as Makino
- Dr. Matsubara (unknown actor)
