= Takashi Hagino =

Japanese actor

- Born: May 27, 1973 (age 52); Tokyo, Japan
- Occupation: Actor
- Years active: 1991 - present

Takashi Hagino (萩野 崇, Hagino Takashi; born 27 May 1973) is a Japanese actor. He is noted for his roles in tokusatsu dramas, such as the lead role in Choukou Senshi Changéríon (超光戦士シャンゼリオン, Chōkō Senshi Shanzerion) and his supporting role in Kamen Rider Ryuki (仮面ライダー龍騎, Kamen Raidā Ryūki) as the psychopath Takeshi Asakura, known as Kamen Rider Ouja.

== Television roles ==
=== Tokusatsu ===
- Choukou Senshi Changéríon (1996) – Akira Suzumura/Changerion
- Kamen Rider Ryuki (2002-2003) – Takeshi Asakura/Kamen Rider Ouja
- Kamen Rider Decade (2009) – Takeshi Asakura/Kamen Rider Ouja (cameo)

=== Anime television ===
- Yugo the Negotiator (2004) - Yūgo Beppu

=== Original Video Animation (OVA) ===
- Hunter × Hunter: G.I. Final (2004) - Biscuit Krueger (adult form)

== Partial filmography ==
- Kids Return (1996)
- Kamen Rider Ryuki: Episode Final (2002) – Takeshi Asakura/Kamen Rider Ouja
- Kamen Rider Den-O: I'm Born! (2007) – Cobra Imagin (Voice)
- Kamen Rider Decade: All Riders vs. Dai-Shocker (2009) – Takeshi Asakura/Kamen Rider Ouja (cameo)
- "Kamen Rider Brave: Let's Survive! Revival of the Beast Riders" (2017) - Takeshi Asakura/Kamen Rider Ouja
