= Ryūki =

- Gender: Male

Origin
- Origin: Japanese
- Meaning: Different meanings depending on the kanji used

Ryūki, Ryuki or Ryuuki (written: 竜輝, 隆基, 竜己, 龍喜, 龍輝, 隆規, or 龍紀) is a masculine Japanese given name. Notable people with the name include:

- Ryuki Honda (本田 竜輝; born 2000), Japanese professional wrestler
- Ryūki Kajita (梶田 隆基; born 1987), Japanese writer, radio personality, actor, and voice actor
- Ryuki Kozawa (小澤 竜己; born 1988), Japanese footballer
- Ryuki Miki (三木 龍喜; 1904–1967), Japanese tennis player
- Ryuki Miura (三浦 龍輝; born 1992), Japanese footballer
- Ryuki Nishimuro (西室 隆規; born 1993), Japanese footballer
- Ryuki Takahashi (高橋 龍輝; born 1993), Japanese actor
- Ryuki Ueyama (上山 龍紀; born 1976), Japanese mixed martial artist
