= Tsuyoshi Koyama =

Japanese voice actor

- 小山 剛志
- Born: October 4, 1967 (age 58); Aichi Prefecture, Japan
- Occupation: Voice actor
- Years active: 1991–present
- Agent: Across Entertainment
- Spouse: Mikuni Shimokawa (m. 2012)

Tsuyoshi Koyama (小山 剛志, Koyama Tsuyoshi; born October 4, 1967) is a Japanese voice actor. He is attached to Across Entertainment.

== Filmography ==
=== Films ===
Year	Title	Role
2010	Wonderful World	Jiro Kumada

=== Television dramas ===
Year	Title	Role
2005	Dragon Zakura	Scout

=== Television animation ===
Year	Title	Role
1999	Turn A Gundam	Phil Ackman
2000–2001	Hunter × Hunter	Johness, Izunabi and Genthru
2000	Detective Conan	Yota Mitani
2001	Cosmo Warrior Zero	Rubia
2005	Beck	Marquee manager
2005	Mushishi	Jin
2005	Eyeshield 21	Rikiya Gao
2005	Trinity Blood	Leon Garcia de Asturias
2006	Utawarerumono	Kurou
2006	Busou Renkin*	Genji Ikusabe
2006	The Wallflower	Hiromi Hanayashiki
2008	Michiko to Hatchin	Tony
2009	Saki	Daisuke Yamaguchi
2010	Katanagatari	Kanara Azekura
2011	Horizon in the Middle of Nowhere	Galileo
2012	Jormungand	Shishō
2012	Sword Art Online	Vassago Cassals
2013	Beast Saga	Killer Shark
2014	Akame ga Kill!	Captain Ogre
2014	Saki: The Nationals	Daisuke Yamaguchi
2014	One Piece	Hajrudin
2014	Hanayamata	Masaru Ōfuna
2014	Gundam Reconguista in G	Dellensen Samatar
2015	Gangsta.	Miles Meyer
2016	Undefeated Bahamut Chronicle	Bagriser Gasthof
2016	Digimon Universe: Appli Monsters	Coachmon
2017	Zero kara Hajimeru Mahō no Sho	Beast Mercenary
2017	Dragon Ball Super	Basil
2017	One Piece	Charlotte Counter, Raideen
2017	Altair: A Record of Battles	Derecho and Esquerdo
2018	Tada Never Falls in Love	Tokugawa Nijimune/Reinbō Shōgun (episode 1–3, ), Juusan (episode 1, 3)
2018	Hinamatsuri	Kiyoshi Baba
2018	Zombie Land Saga	Takeo Gō
2019	If It's for My Daughter, I'd Even Defeat a Demon Lord	Kenneth
2019–2022	Ascendance of a Bookworm	Gunther
2019	One Piece	Holdem
2020	Boruto: Naruto Next Generations	Doragu
2020–22	Yashahime: Princess Half-Demon	Jyūbei
2021	Sakugan	Boss
2021	Restaurant to Another World 2	Souemon
2022	Utawarerumono: Mask of Truth	Kurou
2022	Akiba Maid War	General
2023–2026	Bleach: Thousand-Year Blood War	Gerard Valkyrie
2023	The Eminence in Shadow 2nd Season	Juggernaut
2024	Tōhai	Noriyuki Takatsu
2025	I Left My A-Rank Party to Help My Former Students Reach the Dungeon Depths!	Benwood
2025	Miru: Paths to My Future	Jackson
2025	Tougen Anki	Tsuyoshi Ichinose
2026	I Became a Legend After My 10 Year-Long Last Stand	Golan

=== ONA ===
Year	Title	Role
2021–2023	JoJo's Bizarre Adventure: Stone Ocean	Sports Maxx

=== OVA ===
Year	Title	Role
1999	Legend of the Galactic Heroes	Goodwin
2003	Hunter × Hunter: Greed Island	Genthru
2004	Hunter × Hunter: G.I. Final	Genthru
2013	Nijiiro Prism Girl	Director

=== Theatrical animation ===
Year	Title	Role
2001	Princess Arete	Boax
2009	Mai Mai Miracle	Tatara
2015	Cyborg 009 Vs. Devilman	Geronimo Jr./005
2016	In This Corner of the World	Jūrō
2019	One Piece: Stampede	Bastille

=== Video games ===
Year	Title	Role
2010–2012	Ni no Kuni series	Heburuchi
	BlazBlue series	Bang Shishigami
	Super Smash Bros. for Nintendo 3DS and Wii U and Super Smash Bros. Ultimate	Doc Louis
2010	Xenoblade Chronicles	Dickson
2013	Atelier Escha & Logy: Alchemists of the Dusk Sky	Duke Beriel
2013	Muramasa: The Demon Blade	Shinzaemon Shigematsu
	ZombiU (Japanese dub)	
	Kamen Rider: Climax Series (2010–2012), All Kamen Rider: Rider Generation Series (2012–2016), Kamen Rider: Battride War Series (2013–2016) - Kamen Rider Summonride (2014), Kamen Rider Storm Heroes (2015), Kamen Rider Transcend Heroes (2016)	Kamen Rider Odin
2021	Dragalia Lost	Shingen
2020	Cyberpunk 2077	Takemura
2022	Monster Hunter Rise: Sunbreak	Admiral Galleus
2022	Last Cloudia	Vayne
2023	Octopath Traveler II	General Mugen
2023	Sword Art Online: Last Recollection	Vassago
2024	Final Fantasy VII Rebirth	Captain Titov

=== Tokusatsu ===
Year	Title	Role
2002	Kamen Rider Ryuki	Visor Voice (main ep), Kamen Rider Odin (eps. 27 - 50)
2003	Kamen Rider 555: Paradise Lost	Lion Orphnoch
2007	Kamen Rider Den-O	Rhino Imajin (eps. 9 & 10)
2017	Kamen Rider Ex-Aid	Burgermon Bugster (ep. 17)

=== Dubbing ===
==== Live-action ====
- Brawl in Cell Block 99 – Bradley Thomas (Vince Vaughn)
- FBI – Jubal Valentine (Jeremy Sisto)
- Kamen Rider: Dragon Knight – Eubulon (Mark Dacascos)
- A Lonely Place to Die – Andy (Eamonn Walker)
- The Jungle Book (2016) – Shere Khan (Idris Elba)

==== Animation ====
- Ratchet & Clank – Lieutenant Victor Von Ion
