= Ryohei Odai =

Japanese actor and voice actor

- Born: February 23, 1971 (age 55); Osaka, Japan
- Occupation: Actor
- Years active: 2002 - present
- Spouse: LiLiCo (m. 2018)

Ryohei Odai (小田井 涼平, Odai Ryōhei; born February 23, 1971 in Konohana-ku, Osaka and raised in Kawanishi, Hyogo), otherwise known by his mononym Ryohei (涼平, Ryōhei), is a Japanese actor and voice actor probably best known for providing the voice of Orga Sabnak in Gundam Seed and portraying Shuichi Kitaoka/Kamen Rider Zolda in Kamen Rider Ryuki.

== Filmography ==
=== Anime roles ===
Year	Title	Role	Notes
2002-2003	Mobile Suit Gundam SEED	Orga Sabnak	
2004	Mobile Suit Gundam SEED Destiny: Special Edition	Orga Sabnak	
2005	Mobile Suit Gundam SEED Destiny	Orga Sabnak	Episode 20

=== Live-Action roles ===
Year	Title	Role	Notes	Ref.
2025	Anpan	Degawa	Asadora	
