= Kamen Rider Ryuki =

12th series in the Kamen Rider franchise

- Also known as: Masked Rider Ryuki
- Genre: Tokusatsu; Superhero fiction; Battle royal; Portal fantasy; Psychological thriller
- Created by: Shotaro Ishinomori
- Written by: Yasuko Kobayashi
- Directed by: Ryuta Tasaki
- Starring: Takamasa Suga; Satoshi Matsuda; Ayano Sugiyama; Kenzaburo Kikuchi; Kazue Tsunogae; Ryohei; Tomohisa Yuge; Takashi Hagino; Kanji Tsuda; Sayaka Kuon; Hitomi Kurihara; Chisato Morishita
- Voices of: Tsuyoshi Koyama
- Narrated by: Eiichiro Suzuki
- Opening theme: "Alive A life" by Rica Matsumoto
- Composers: Kazunori Maruyama; Cher Watanabe
- Country of origin: Japan
- Original language: Japanese
- No. of episodes: 50

Production
- Producers: Kazuo Tsuburai (TV Asahi); Chiharu Nakasone (TV Asahi); Shinichiro Shirakura (Toei); Naomi Takebe (Toei)
- Running time: 20–25 minutes
- Production companies: Toei Company; Ishimori Productions; Asahi National Broadcasting; Asatsu-DK

Original release
- Network: TV Asahi
- Release: February 3, 2002 – January 19, 2003

Related
- Kamen Rider Agito; Kamen Rider 555

Kamen Rider Ryuki (仮面ライダー龍騎, Kamen Raidā Ryūki) is a Japanese tokusatsu television series. The 12th installment in the Kamen Rider Series, it was a joint collaboration between Ishimori Productions and Toei, and it was shown on TV Asahi from February 3, 2002 to January 19, 2003. The series marked the franchise's switch from Columbia Music Entertainment to Avex Group, which continues to produce music for the series today. The series aired along with Ninpuu Sentai Hurricaneger. It is the first series that debuted an animal, knights, cards, and battle royal motif.

In 2008, Ryuki was adapted into the American television series Kamen Rider: Dragon Knight, the second American adaptation of a Kamen Rider series after Saban's Masked Rider (1995).

== Story ==
Thirteen Card Decks were created for thirteen Kamen Riders. They form contracts with monsters from the mysterious Mirror World, a parallel dimension opposite to our own in which only the Kamen Riders can exist. The Riders draw on their monsters' strength in exchange for feeding them the life force of the creatures they destroy. The creator of the Advent Cards has only one rule: that there can be only one Kamen Rider. The others must be killed, and the sole victor will be granted a single wish, which leads to a conflict known as the Rider Fight.

All over the city, innocent people are being mysteriously abducted, never to be seen again. During his investigations of these incidents, Shinji Kido – an intern at the online news service ORE Journal – discovers one of the Advent Card decks at an apartment where every reflective surface has been covered by a newspaper. He is soon sucked into the Mirror World, discovering the terrifying truth behind the disappearances: people are being pulled through mirrors by the monsters of the Mirror World so that they may feed. He is about to be killed by a powerful dragon named Dragreder when he is saved by a Kamen Rider Knight: Ren Akiyama. Ren seeks to win the Rider Fight at all costs. He works with a young woman named Yui Kanzaki, who seeks her missing brother: the master of the Rider Fight, Shiro Kanzaki. Seeing Ren's strength, Shinji enters the Rider Fight, not for the prize, but so that he may protect innocent people from the threat of the Mirror World, and stop the senseless fighting between the Kamen Riders. With Dragreder as his contract monster, he becomes Kamen Rider Ryuki.

He discovers that some people cannot be saved and that he must sometimes fight to stop the fighting. The extent to which he must go if he wants his deepest wish to come true, and the sacrifices that he must make. In the very end, there can be only one Kamen Rider.

== Episodes ==
No.	Title	Directed by	Written by	Original release date
1	"The Secret Story's Birth"; Transliteration: "Tanjō Hiwa" (Japanese: 誕生秘話)	Ryuta Tasaki	Yasuko Kobayashi	February 3, 2002
2	"Giant Spider Counterattack"; Transliteration: "Kyodai Kumo Gyakushū" (Japanese: 巨大クモ逆襲)	Ryuta Tasaki	Yasuko Kobayashi	February 10, 2002
3	"School Ghost Story"; Transliteration: "Gakkō no Kaidan" (Japanese: 学校の怪談)	Hidenori Ishida	Yasuko Kobayashi	February 17, 2002
4	"School Ghost Story 2"; Transliteration: "Gakkō no Kaidan Tsū" (Japanese: 学校の怪談2)	Hidenori Ishida	Yasuko Kobayashi	February 24, 2002
5	"The Monster's Antique Store"; Transliteration: "Kottōya no Kaijin" (Japanese: 骨董屋の怪人)	Takao Nagaishi	Yasuko Kobayashi	March 3, 2002
6	"The Mysterious Rider"; Transliteration: "Nazo no Raidā" (Japanese: 謎のライダー)	Takao Nagaishi	Yasuko Kobayashi	March 10, 2002
7	"A New Species Is Born?"; Transliteration: "Shinshu Tanjō?" (Japanese: 新種誕生?)	Ryuta Tasaki	Toshiki Inoue	March 17, 2002
8	"The Fourth, Zolda"; Transliteration: "Yoninme Zoruda" (Japanese: 4人目ゾルダ)	Ryuta Tasaki	Toshiki Inoue	March 24, 2002
9	"Shinji's Arrested!?"; Transliteration: "Shinji ga Taiho!?" (Japanese: 真司が逮捕!?)	Hidenori Ishida	Toshiki Inoue	March 31, 2002
10	"Knight's Crisis"; Transliteration: "Naito no Kiki" (Japanese: ナイトの危機)	Hidenori Ishida	Toshiki Inoue	April 7, 2002
11	"The Mysterious Empty Train"; Transliteration: "Nazo no Mujin Densha" (Japanese: 謎の無人電車)	Takao Nagaishi	Yasuko Kobayashi	April 14, 2002
12	"Ren Akiyama's Lover"; Transliteration: "Akiyama Ren no Koibito" (Japanese: 秋山蓮の恋人)	Takao Nagaishi	Yasuko Kobayashi	April 21, 2002
13	"That Man, Zolda"; Transliteration: "Sono Otoko Zoruda" (Japanese: その男ゾルダ)	Ryuta Tasaki	Yasuko Kobayashi	April 28, 2002
14	"Revival Day"; Transliteration: "Fukkatsu no Hi" (Japanese: 復活の日)	Ryuta Tasaki	Yasuko Kobayashi	May 5, 2002
15	"Iron Mask Legend"; Transliteration: "Tekkamen Densetsu" (Japanese: 鉄仮面伝説)	Hidenori Ishida	Toshiki Inoue	May 12, 2002
16	"Card of Destiny"; Transliteration: "Unmei no Kādo" (Japanese: 運命のカード)	Hidenori Ishida	Toshiki Inoue	May 19, 2002
17	"The Grieving Knight"; Transliteration: "Nageki no Naito" (Japanese: 嘆きのナイト)	Takao Nagaishi	Yasuko Kobayashi	May 26, 2002
18	"Jailbreak Rider"; Transliteration: "Datsugoku Raidā" (Japanese: 脱獄ライダー)	Takao Nagaishi	Yasuko Kobayashi	June 2, 2002
19	"Rider Gathering"; Transliteration: "Raidā Shūketsu" (Japanese: ライダー集結)	Takao Nagaishi	Yasuko Kobayashi	June 9, 2002
20	"The Traitorous Ren"; Transliteration: "Uragiri no Ren" (Japanese: 裏切りの蓮)	Kenkō Satō	Yasuko Kobayashi	June 16, 2002
21	"Yui's Past"; Transliteration: "Yui no Kako" (Japanese: 優衣の過去)	Kenkō Satō	Yasuko Kobayashi	June 23, 2002
22	"Raia's Revenge"; Transliteration: "Raia no Fukushū" (Japanese: ライアの復讐)	Hidenori Ishida	Yasuko Kobayashi	June 30, 2002
23	"Changing Destiny"; Transliteration: "Kawaru Unmei" (Japanese: 変わる運命)	Hidenori Ishida	Yasuko Kobayashi	July 7, 2002
24	"Ouja's Secret"; Transliteration: "Ōja no Himitsu" (Japanese: 王蛇の秘密)	Takao Nagaishi	Toshiki Inoue	July 14, 2002
25	"Combining Ouja"; Transliteration: "Gattai Suru Ōja" (Japanese: 合体する王蛇)	Takao Nagaishi	Toshiki Inoue	July 21, 2002
26	"Zolda's Assault"; Transliteration: "Zoruda no Kōgeki" (Japanese: ゾルダの攻撃)	Kenkō Satō	Yasuko Kobayashi	July 28, 2002
27	"The 13th Rider"; Transliteration: "Jū-san-gō Raidā" (Japanese: 13号ライダー)	Kenkō Satō	Yasuko Kobayashi	August 4, 2002
28	"Time Vent"; Transliteration: "Taimu Bento" (Japanese: タイムベント)	Nobuhiro Suzumura	Yasuko Kobayashi	August 11, 2002
29	"Marriage Interview Battle"; Transliteration: "Miai Gassen" (Japanese: 見合い合戦)	Hidenori Ishida	Toshiki Inoue	August 18, 2002
30	"Zolda's Lover"; Transliteration: "Zoruda no Koibito" (Japanese: ゾルダの恋人)	Hidenori Ishida	Toshiki Inoue	August 25, 2002
31	"The Girl and Ouja"; Transliteration: "Shōjo to Ōja" (Japanese: 少女と王蛇)	Takao Nagaishi	Yasuko Kobayashi	September 1, 2002
32	"Secret Data Gathering"; Transliteration: "Himitsu no Shuzai" (Japanese: 秘密の取材)	Takao Nagaishi	Yasuko Kobayashi	September 8, 2002
33	"The Mirror's Magic"; Transliteration: "Kagami no Majikku" (Japanese: 鏡のマジック)	Kenkō Satō	Yasuko Kobayashi	September 15, 2002
34	"Friendship's Battle"; Transliteration: "Yūjō no Batoru" (Japanese: 友情のバトル)	Kenkō Satō	Yasuko Kobayashi	September 22, 2002
35	"Enter Tiger"; Transliteration: "Taiga Tōjō" (Japanese: タイガ登場)	Hidenori Ishida	Yasuko Kobayashi	September 29, 2002
36	"The Battle Ends"; Transliteration: "Tatakai wa Owaru" (Japanese: 戦いは終わる)	Hidenori Ishida	Yasuko Kobayashi	October 6, 2002
37	"Sleep Is Awakening"; Transliteration: "Nemuri ga Samete" (Japanese: 眠りが覚めて)	Takao Nagaishi	Yasuko Kobayashi	October 13, 2002
38	"Targeted Yui"; Transliteration: "Nerawareta Yui" (Japanese: 狙われた優衣)	Takao Nagaishi	Yasuko Kobayashi	October 20, 2002
39	"A Dangerous Sign"; Transliteration: "Kiken no Sain" (Japanese: 危険のサイン)	Nobuhiro Suzumura	Yasuko Kobayashi	October 27, 2002
40	"Memories of an Older Brother and Younger Sister"; Transliteration: "Ani to Imōto no Kioku" (Japanese: 兄と妹の記憶)	Nobuhiro Suzumura	Yasuko Kobayashi	November 10, 2002
41	"Imperer"; Transliteration: "Inperā" (Japanese: インペラー)	Ryuta Tasaki	Toshiki Inoue	November 17, 2002
42	"Room 401"; Transliteration: "Yonhyaku-ichi-gōshitsu" (Japanese: 401号室)	Ryuta Tasaki	Toshiki Inoue	November 24, 2002
43	"The Hero Fights"; Transliteration: "Eiyū wa Tatakau" (Japanese: 英雄は戦う)	Hidenori Ishida	Toshiki Inoue	December 1, 2002
44	"Glassy Happiness"; Transliteration: "Garasu no Kōfuku" (Japanese: ガラスの幸福)	Hidenori Ishida	Toshiki Inoue	December 8, 2002
45	"The Twentieth Birthday"; Transliteration: "Hatachi no Tanjōbi" (Japanese: 20歳の誕生日)	Takao Nagaishi	Yasuko Kobayashi	December 15, 2002
46	"Tiger's a Hero"; Transliteration: "Taiga wa Eiyū" (Japanese: タイガは英雄)	Takao Nagaishi	Yasuko Kobayashi	December 22, 2002
47	"Determination of Battle"; Transliteration: "Tatakai no Ketsudan" (Japanese: 戦いの決断)	Takao Nagaishi	Yasuko Kobayashi	December 29, 2002
48	"The Final 3 Days"; Transliteration: "Saigo no Mikkakan" (Japanese: 最後の3日間)	Hidenori Ishida	Yasuko Kobayashi	January 5, 2003
49	"Granting a Wish"; Transliteration: "Kanaetai Negai" (Japanese: 叶えたい願い)	Hidenori Ishida	Yasuko Kobayashi	January 12, 2003
50	"A New Life"; Transliteration: "Atarashii Inochi" (Japanese: 新しい命)	Hidenori Ishida	Yasuko Kobayashi	January 19, 2003

== Movies and specials ==
=== 13 Riders ===
Kamen Rider Ryuki Special: 13 Riders (仮面ライダー龍騎スペシャル 13RIDERS, Kamen Raidā Ryūki Supesharu Sātīn Raidāzu) was written by Toshiki Inoue and directed by Ryuta Tasaki. It features the debut of the thirteenth Kamen Rider in the continuity of Ryuki: Verde. This special was first broadcast on TV Asahi on September 19, 2002 to April 29, 2026. It was later released on DVD on July 21, 2003. The DVD also featured information on the characters, an interview with actor Arthur Kuroda, and an "interview" with some of the characters.

This television special is an alternate telling of the Kamen Rider Ryuki story. Shinji Kido's life, working as an employee at ORE Journal, takes a sharp turn after being pulled into the Mirror World by a Mispider. Luckily, he was saved by a Kamen Rider, Ryuki (Koichi Sakakibara, portrayed by Keiichi Wada). However, Sakakibara could no longer go on due to the severity of his injuries and passed his Card Deck to Shinji, allowing him to become the next Ryuki and defeat the monster. After meeting Yui Kanzaki and Ren Akiyama (Kamen Rider Knight), Shinji learns about the conditions of the Rider Fight, as well as of the other Riders participating. Unable to allow such a game of death to exist like his Rider predecessor, Shinji sets out to convince all the Riders to end the senseless fighting and put an end to the War. His pleas fall upon deaf ears as just about every other Rider (except for the already-defeated Riders Raia and Scissors) sets out to hunt down Shinji and his eventual reluctant ally, Ren. Eventually, Shinji's deck is destroyed and Ren dies, after passing on the deck for Kamen Rider Knight to Shinji. The special has two different endings which were voted on by the viewers via phone at the time of the initial airing: the voted-for-air ending (in which Shinji faces the surviving Riders on his own) and the alternate ending (a resetting of the Rider Fight).

=== Episode Final ===
Kamen Rider Ryuki the Movie: Episode Final (劇場版 仮面ライダー龍騎 EPISODE FINAL, Gekijōban Kamen Raidā Ryūki Episōdo Fainaru) is a film released on August 17, 2002, doubled-billed with Ninpuu Sentai Hurricaneger: Shushutto the Movie. The film is an alternate ending to the series, taking place after the events of episode 46. With only six Riders remaining in the Rider Fight; Ryuki (Shinji Kido), Knight (Ren Akiyama), Zolda (Shuichi Kitaoka), Ouja (Takeshi Asakura), and Femme (Miho Kirishima); Shiro Kanzaki alerts them to quickly settle the Rider Fight within three days. One of them must win and become the last survivor before the sixth surviving Rider reveals himself. Amidst the impending chaos of the fight between the Riders, Shinji discovers an unbelievable truth about the relationship between Yui Kanzaki and the Mirror World, as well as discovering the existence of his Mirror World doppelganger, Kamen Rider Ryuga.

=== Ryuki vs. Kamen Rider Agito ===
Kamen Rider Ryuki: Ryuki vs. Kamen Rider Agito (仮面ライダー龍騎 龍騎vs仮面ライダーアギト, Kamen Raidā Ryūki Ryūki Bui Esu Kamen Raidā Agito) is the Ryuki Hyper Battle Video. It features Shinji Kido having a dream where he joins up with Kamen Riders Knight, Zolda, and Ouja, all of whom who are acting out-of-character, to fight an evil Kamen Rider Agito in the Mirror World. They are soon joined by the real Kamen Rider Agito who helps defeat his evil doppelganger.

=== Ultra Super Hero Taisen ===
A crossover film, titled Kamen Rider × Super Sentai: Ultra Super Hero Taisen (仮面ライダー×スーパー戦隊 超スーパーヒーロー大戦, Kamen Raidā × Supā Sentai Chō Supā Hīrō Taisen) featuring the casts of Kamen Rider Ex-Aid, Amazon Riders, Uchu Sentai Kyuranger, and Doubutsu Sentai Zyuohger, was released in Japan on March 25, 2017. This movie also celebrates the 10th anniversary of Kamen Rider Den-O and features the spaceship Andor Genesis from the Xevious game, which is used by the movie's main antagonists, as well as introduces the movie-exclusive Kamen Rider True Brave, played by Kamen Rider Brave's actor Toshiki Seto from Kamen Rider Ex-Aid, and the villain Shocker Great Leader III, played by the singer Diamond Yukai. In addition, individual actors from older Kamen Rider and Super Sentai TV series, Ryohei Odai (Kamen Rider Ryuki), Gaku Matsumoto (Shuriken Sentai Ninninger), Atsushi Maruyama (Zyuden Sentai Kyoryuger), and Hiroya Matsumoto (Tokumei Sentai Go-Busters) reprise their respective roles.

=== Heisei Generations Forever ===
A Movie War film, titled Kamen Rider Heisei Generations Forever (仮面ライダー平成ジェネレーションズ FOREVER, Kamen Raidā Heisei Jenerēshonzu Fōebā) was released on December 22, 2018, featuring the casts of Kamen Rider Zi-O and Kamen Rider Build along with Kamen Rider Den-O. Actor Shunsuke Daitō portrayed the superior Time Jacker Tid, and actor Kenichi Takitō voiced the Imagin Futaros. Aside from Build, actors Toshiki Kashu (Kamen Rider Agito), Takamasa Suga, Masahiro Inoue (Kamen Rider Decade) and Shun Nishime (Kamen Rider Ghost) also voice their respective reprised roles for the film, while Takeru Satoh (Kamen Rider Den-O) only reprised his role to appear. The events of the film take place between episodes 12 to 13 and before episode 21 where Suga returned physically.

=== Rider Time: Kamen Rider Ryuki ===
A spin-off web sequel, titled Rider Time: Kamen Rider Ryuki (RIDER TIME 仮面ライダー龍騎, Raidā Taimu Kamen Raidā Ryūki) was announced and released on Video Pass at March 31, 2019 - April 17, 2019, and written by Toshiki Inoue. The storyline is a sequel to the original Ryuki TV series, which features the shocking return of the Mirror World's Rider Fight. Takamasa Suga, Satoshi Matsuda, Hassei Takano, Satoshi Ichijo, Tomohisa Yuge, Takashi Hagino, and Tsuyoshi Koyama reprise their respective roles, in addition to guest featuring the main actors from the current series airing Kamen Rider Zi-O, So Okuno and Gaku Oshida. It also re-introduces Kamen Rider Abyss from Kamen Rider Decade to the main universe. The theme song is "Go! Now! ~Alive A life neo~" performed by Rica Matsumoto.

=== Movie Battle Royale ===
Kamen Rider Geats × Revice: Movie Battle Royale (仮面ライダーギーツ×リバイス MOVIEバトルロワイヤル, Kamen Raidā Gītsu Ribaisu Mūbī Batoru Rowaiyaru) is a crossover film released on December 23, 2022, which mainly stars the casts of Kamen Rider Revice and Geats, while four Riders (Ryuki, Knight and Ouja, including Ryuga) from Ryuki act as supporting casts to commemorate the series' 20th anniversary. Takamasa Suga, Satoshi Matsuda, and Takashi Hagino reprised their respective roles. The film was written by Yuya Takahashi and Hanta Kinoshita and directed by Takayuki Shibasaki.

== Production ==
The Kamen Rider Ryuki trademark was registered by Toei on November 1, 2001. The series works with the motif of cards inspired by Yu-Gi-Oh and the human relationship. Ryuki was meant to have 50 riders, so each monster of the week feature a rider to challenge the protagonist, but it was scrapped and the number of riders reduced to 13, however only 10 of them appeared in the series, 2 are shown in the movie and the other one in a special.

== S.I.C. Hero Saga ==
Ryuki had two separate S.I.C. Hero Saga side stories published in Monthly Hobby Japan magazine. The first was titled Masked Rider Ryuki: Advent Calendar (MASKED RIDER RYUKI -アドベントカレンダー-, Kamen Raidā Ryūki -Adobento Karendā-) and featured original characters Kamen Rider Ouja Survive (仮面ライダー王蛇サバイブ, Kamen Raidā Ōja Sabaibu) and his Mirror Monster the Genosurviver (ジェノサバイバー, Jenosabaibā). The second S.I.C. Hero Saga story Masked Rider Ryuki: World of If (MASKED RIDER RYUKI -IFの世界-, Kamen Raidā Ryūki -Ifu no Sekai-) is an alternate telling that features Ouja Survive from Advent Calendar and also introduces Kamen Rider Ryuga Survive (仮面ライダーリュウガサバイブ, Kamen Raidā Ryūga Sabaibu). Advent Calendar ran from August to December 2004 and World of If ran from June to August 2005.

Advent Calendar chapter titles

1. Advent 4 (待降節・4, Taikōsetsu 4)
2. Advent 3 (待降節・3, Taikōsetsu 3)
3. Advent 2 (待降節・2, Taikōsetsu 2)
4. Advent 1 (待降節・1, Taikōsetsu 1)
5. Nightmare Before (ナイトメア・ビフォア, Naitomea Bifoa)

World of If chapter titles

1. Ryuga (リュウガ, Ryūga)
2. Alternative (オルタナティブ, Orutanatibu)
3. Odin (オーディン, Ōdin)

== Novel ==
Novel: Kamen Rider Ryuki (小説 仮面ライダー龍騎, Shōsetsu Kamen Raidā Ryūki), written by Toshiki Inoue, is part of a series of spin-off novel adaptions of the Heisei Era Kamen Riders. The novel was released on August 30, 2013.

== Video game ==
A video game based on the series, developed by Digifloyd and published by Bandai, was released in Japan in 2002 for the PlayStation. It is a basic fighting game where all thirteen Riders are playable with all the forms seen in the show, movie, and specials (except for the Alternatives and Ouja's Blank Form, seen in the Episode Final movie). Four of the Contract Monsters (Volcancer, Metalgelas, Destwilder, and Gigazelle), the two Zebraskulls (Iron and Bronze), and Megazelle are also playable.

== Cast ==
- Shinji Kido (城戸 真司, Kido Shinji): Takamasa Suga (須賀 貴匡, Suga Takamasa)
- Ren Akiyama (秋山 蓮, Akiyama Ren): Satoshi Matsuda (松田 悟志, Matsuda Satoshi)
- Yui Kanzaki (神崎 優衣, Kanzaki Yui): Ayano Sugiyama (杉山 彩乃, Sugiyama Ayano)
- Shiro Kanzaki (神崎 士郎, Kanzaki Shirō): Kenzaburo Kikuchi (菊地 謙三郎, Kikuchi Kenzaburo)
- Shuichi Kitaoka (北岡 秀一, Kitaoka Shūichi): Ryohei (涼平, Ryōhei)
- Goro Yura (由良 吾郎, Yura Gorō): Tomohisa Yuge (弓削 智久, Yuge Tomohisa)
- Takeshi Asakura (浅倉 威, Asakura Takeshi): Takashi Hagino (萩野 崇, Hagino Takashi)
- Masashi Sudo (須藤 雅史, Sudō Masashi): Takeshi Kimura (木村 剛, Kimura Takeshi)
- Miyuki Tezuka (手塚 海之, Tezuka Miyuki): Hassei Takano (高野 八誠, Takano Hassei)
- Jun Shibaura (芝浦 淳, Shibaura Jun): Satoshi Ichijo (一條 俊, Ichijō Satoshi)
- Satoru Tojo (東條 悟, Tōjō Satoru): Jun Takatsuki (高槻 純, Takatsuki Jun)
- Mitsuru Sano (佐野 満, Sano Mitsuru): Takashi Hyuga (日向 崇, Hyūga Takashi)
- Daisuke Okubo (大久保 大介, Ōkubo Daisuke): Kanji Tsuda (津田 寛治, Tsuda Kanji)
- Reiko Momoi (桃井 令子, Reiko Momoi): Sayaka Kuon (久遠 さやか, Kuon Sayaka)
- Nanako Shimada (島田 奈々子, Shimada Nanako): Hitomi Kurihara (栗原 瞳, Kurihara Hitomi)
- Megumi Asano (浅野めぐみ, Asano Megumi): Chisato Morishita (森下千里, Morishita Chisato)
- Sanako Kanzaki (神崎 沙奈子, Kanzaki Sanako): Kazue Tsunogae (角替 和枝, Tsunogae Kazue)
- Eri Ogawa (小川 恵里, Ogawa Eri): Mahiru Tsubura (つぶら まひる, Tsubura Mahiru)
- Hajime Nakamura (仲村 創, Nakamura Hajime): Junichi Mizuno (水野 純一, Mizuno Jun'ichi)
- Hideyuki Kagawa (香川 英行, Kagawa Hideyuki): Satoshi Jinbo (神保 悟志, Jinbo Satoshi)

=== Voice cast ===
- Kamen Rider Odin (仮面ライダーオーディン, Kamen Raidā Ōdin), Visors (バイザー, Baizā): Tsuyoshi Koyama (小山 剛志, Koyama Tsuyoshi)
- Slash Visor (スラッシュバイザー, Surasshu Baizā): Midori Edamura (枝村 みどり, Edamura Midori)
- Mirror Monsters (ミラーモンスター, Mirā Monsutā) (majority of episodes): Hiroyuki Shibamoto (柴本 浩行, Shibamoto Hiroyuki), Katsumi Shiono (塩野 勝美, Shiono Katsumi), Yoshimasa Chida (千田 義正, Chida Yoshimasa), Shigenori Sōya (宗矢 樹頼, Sōya Shigenori), Yumi Takada (高田 由美, Takada Yumi), Izumi Kikuchi (菊池 いづみ, Kikuchi Izumi), Mie Odagi (尾田木 美衣, Odagi Mie), Mako Hyōdō (兵藤 まこ, Hyōdō Mako), Jin Yamanoi (山野井 仁, Yamanoi Jin)
- Narrator: Eiichiro Suzuki (鈴木 英一郎, Suzuki Eiichirō)

== Songs ==
Opening theme

- "Alive A life"
  - Lyrics: Yuko Ebine (海老根 祐子, Ebine Yūko)
  - Composition: Kohei Wada (和田 耕平, Wada Kōhei)
  - Arrangement: Kohei Wada & Kazuya Honda (本田 嘉津也, Honda Kazuya)
  - Artist: Rica Matsumoto (松本 梨香, Matsumoto Rika)

insert themes

- "Hatenaki Inochi" (果てなき希望（いのち）; "Boundless Life")
  - Lyrics: Shin-ichiro Aoyama (青山 紳一郎, Aoyama Shin'ichirō)
  - Composition: Yo Tsuji (辻 陽, Tsuji Yō)
  - Arrangement: Masatoshi Sakashita (坂下 正俊, Sakashita Masatoshi)
  - Artist: Hiroshi Kitadani (きただに ひろし, Kitadani Hiroshi)
  - Episodes: 1–17, 19–33
- "Hateshinai Honō no Naka e" (果てしない炎の中ヘ; "Into the Eternal Flame")
  - Lyrics: Keiko Terada & Yoshihiko Ando (安藤 芳彦, Andō Yoshihiko)
  - Composition: Yoshio Nomura (野村 義男, Nomura Yoshio)
  - Arrangement: RIDER CHIPS
  - Artist: RIDER CHIPS featuring Keiko Terada (寺田 恵子, Terada Keiko)
  - Episodes: 18
- "Revolution"
  - Lyrics: Yuko Ebine
  - Composition & Arrangement: Mikio Sakai
  - Artist: Hiroshi Kitadani
  - Episodes: 34–37, 39–50, TV Special
- "Lonely Soldier"
  - Lyrics: Yuko Ebine
  - Composition: Yo Tsuji
  - Arrangement: Akio Kondo (近藤 昭雄, Akio Kondō)
  - Artist: Ren Akiyama (Satoshi Matsuda)
  - Episodes: 38

== See also ==
- Gamera the Brave
