= Takamasa Suga =

Japanese actor (born 1977)

- 須賀 貴匡
- Born: Takamasa Suga; 19 October 1977 (age 48); Edogawa-ku, Tokyo, Japan
- Occupation: Actor
- Years active: 1999–present
- Height: 1.74 m (5 ft 8 1/2 in)

Takamasa Suga (須賀 貴匡, Suga Takamasa; born 19 October 1977, in Edogawa-ku, Tokyo) is a Japanese actor who had several lead roles, most prominently as the protagonist Shinji Kido in Kamen Rider Ryuki.

== Filmography ==
=== Films ===
- Kamen Rider Ryuki: Episode Final (2002) as Shinji Kido/Kamen Rider Ryuki; Mirror Shinji/Kamen Rider Ryuga
- Mail (2004) as Reiji Akiba
- Waters (2005) as Yuki
- Cromartie High – The Movie (Sakigake!! Cromartie Koukou) as Takashi Kamiyama
- Death Trance
- Love My Life as Akira
- TAJOMARU (2009) as Taka
- HE-LOW (2018) as Hiroshi Motooka
- Kamen Rider Heisei Generations Forever (2018) as Kamen Rider Ryuki (voice)
- HE-LOW THE SECOND (2019) as Hiroshi Motooka/Slider Kamen Dragon Knight
- Genin: Blue Shadow (2019) as Takamasa
- Howling Village (2020) as Keisuke
- HE-LOW THE FINAL (2022) as Hiroshi Motooka/Slider Kamen Dragon Knight
- Kamen Rider Geats × Revice: Movie Battle Royale (2022) as Shinji Kido/Kamen Rider Ryuki; Mirror Shinji/Kamen Rider Ryuga

=== Television ===
- Kamen Rider Ryuki (2002) as Shinji Kido/Kamen Rider Ryuki
- Kamen Rider Ryuki Special: 13 Riders (2002) as Shinji Kido/Kamen Rider Ryuki; Kamen Rider Ryuga
- Sh15uya (2005)
- Tenchijin (2009) as Ukita Hideie
- Fashion Story: Model (2012)
- Yae no Sakura (2013), as Kusaka Genzui
- Gunshi Kanbei (2014), as Tatsuzō
- Hana Moyu (2015), as Murakami Tsunehisa
- Massan (2015), as Shingo Yamamura
- Kamen Rider Zi-O (2019) as Shinji Kido; Mirror Shinji/Another Ryuga
- Kamen Rider Zi-O Spin-off – Rider Time: Kamen Rider Ryuki (2019) as Shinji Kido/Kamen Rider Ryuki; Mirror Shinji/Kamen Rider Ryuga
- Kirin ga Kuru (2020) as Saitō Toshimitsu

=== Theatre ===
- unrato #6 "Fuyu no Jidai " (March 20 – 27, 2020, Tokyo Metropolitan Theatre, Theatre West) – as Shiburoku
- unrato #8 "Bara to Kaizoku " (March 4–13, 2022, Tokyo Metropolitan Theatre Theatre West / March 25–26, 2022, Ibaraki City Civic Center Create Center) – as Shigemasa
- Fujimi-cho Apartment 2022 "Umi e " (April 28 – May 8, 2022, Haiyuza Theater) – as Ito
- Gekidan Jikan Seisaku "12-Ri no Samishī Oyatachi " (September 22 – October 2, 2022, Tokyo Metropolitan Theatre, Theatre West) – as Jury Member No. 8
- PLAY/GROUND Creation #4 "CLOSER " [side-A] (December 10–17, 2022, Theatre Fūshikaden) – as Dan
- Shinran Shonin no Goshu 850-Nen Rikkyo Kaiso 800-Nen Keishin Houmyo Kinen "Wakaki Hi no Shinran " (April 10 – 29, 2023, Minami-za) – as Fushimi Heishiro / The Black-faced Priest
- Nakamura Kyozo Souryou no Kai "Phèdre " (August 19–20, 2023, New National Theatre, Small Theatre) – as Ippolito
- unrato #10 "Three Sisters " (September 23–30, 2023, Jiyu Theatre) – as Kruigin

=== Japanese dub ===
- Minority Report as Chief John Anderton (Tom Cruise)
