= Ryuta Tasaki =

Japanese film director from Tokyo (born 1964)

- Born: 19 April 1964 (age 62); Tokyo, Japan
- Occupation: Director

Ryuta Tasaki (田崎 竜太, Tasaki Ryūta; born 19 April 1964) is a Japanese director from Tokyo. Tasaki is most known for directing episodes of Pretty Guardian Sailor Moon, Cutie Honey: The Live, and the Super Sentai, Power Rangers, and Kamen Rider series.

== Filmography ==
- series director denoted in bold

=== TV series ===
- Kamen Rider Black (1987): Assistant director
- Kamen Rider Black RX (1988): Assistant director
- Chōriki Sentai Ohranger (1995)
- Gekisou Sentai Carranger (1996)
- Denji Sentai Megaranger (1997)
- **Seijuu Sentai Gingaman** (1998)
- Power Rangers Lost Galaxy (1999)
- **Power Rangers Lightspeed Rescue** (2000)
- **Kamen Rider Agito** (2001)
- **Kamen Rider Ryuki** (2002)
- **Kamen Rider 555** (2003)
- **Pretty Guardian Sailor Moon** (2003)
- **Sh15uya** (2005)
- Kamen Rider Kabuto (2006)
- **Kamen Rider Den-O** (2007)
- Cutie Honey: The Live (2007)
- **Kamen Rider Kiva** (2008)
- **Kamen Rider Decade** (2009)
- **Kamen Rider W** (2009–2010)
- **Kamen Rider OOO** (2010–2011)
- Kamen Rider Fourze (2011–2012)
- Kamen Rider Wizard (2012–2013)
- **Unofficial Sentai Akibaranger** (2012–2013)
- **Kamen Rider Gaim** (2013–2014)
- **Kamen Rider Drive** (2014–2015)
- Kamen Rider Ghost (2015–2016)
- **Kamen Rider Build** (2017–2018)
- **Kamen Rider Zi-O** (2018–2019)
- Kamen Rider Zero-One (2019–2020)
- Kikai Sentai Zenkaiger (2021–2022)
- **Avataro Sentai Donbrothers** (2022–2023)
- **Kamen Rider Gotchard** (2023–2024)
- Kamen Rider Gavv (2025)
- **No.1 Sentai Gozyuger** (2025-2026)

=== Films ===
- Kamen Rider Agito: Project G4 (2001)
- Kamen Rider Ryuki: Episode Final (2002)
- Kamen Rider 555: Paradise Lost (2003)
- Gamera the Brave (2006)
- Kamen Rider The Next (2007)
- Kamen Rider Kiva: King of the Castle in the Demon World (2008)
- Cho Kamen Rider Den-O & Decade Neo Generations: The Onigashima Warship (2009)
- Kamen Rider × Kamen Rider W & Decade: Movie War 2010 (2009)
- Kamen Rider × Kamen Rider OOO & W Featuring Skull: Movie War Core (2010)
- Salvage Mice (2011)
- Kamen Rider × Kamen Rider Gaim & Wizard: The Fateful Sengoku Movie Battle (2013)
- Saber + Zenkaiger: Super Hero Senki (2021)

=== V-Cinema ===
- Ninja Sentai Kakuranger Super Video (1994)
- Gekisou Sentai Carranger Super Video (1996)
- Denji Sentai Megaranger vs. Carranger (1998)
