= Hitomi Kurihara =

Japanese actress (born 1981)

- 栗原 瞳
- Born: Hitomi Kurihara; September 2, 1981 (age 44); Ibaraki Prefecture, Japan
- Years active: 2002–present

Hitomi Kurihara (栗原 瞳, Kurihara Hitomi; born September 2, 1981) is a Japanese actress from Ibaraki Prefecture. She has appeared in various tokusatsu dramas. Her most prominent roles were as Nanako Shimada in Kamen Rider Ryuki and Smart Lady in Kamen Rider 555. She also sang her character's song on the Kamen Rider 555 soundtrack entitled "My Name is Smart Lady."

== Filmography ==
- Kamen Rider Ryuki (2002-2003) – Nanako Shimada
- Kamen Rider Ryuki Special: 13 Riders (2002) – Nanako Shimada
- Kamen Rider Ryuki: Episode Final (2002) – Nanako Shimada
- Kamen Rider 555 (2003-2004) – "Smart Lady"
- Kamen Rider 555: Paradise Lost (2003) – Smart Lady
- Kamen Rider 555: Hyper Battle Video (Faiz the Musical) (2003) – Smart Lady
- Kamen Rider Den-O (2007) – Yumi Saitō (Episodes 7-8)
- Specter (2005) – Makino
- Tokyo Tower: Mom and Me, and Sometimes Dad (2007)
- Shibuya kaidan: The riaru toshi densetsu (2006)
- Jam Films (2002) – (segment "Justice")
