= Tomohisa Yuge =

Japanese actor

- 弓削智久
- Born: May 25, 1980 (age 44)
- Occupation: actor
- Years active: 2000–present
- Notable credit(s): Kamen Rider Ryuki as Goro Yura; Pretty Guardian Sailor Moon as Fake Tuxedo Kamen
- Height: 1.86 m (6 ft 1 in)

Tomohisa Yuge (弓削智久, Yuge Tomohisa, born 25 May 1980) is a Japanese actor who has had roles in numerous TV Asahi Tokusatsu shows, including Kamen Rider Ryuki and Kamen Rider Kabuto, as well as a number of films.

== Filmography ==
=== Drama ===
- Kamen Rider Ryuki (2003), Goro Yura
- Kamen Rider Ryuki Special: 13 Riders (2003), Goro Yura
- Pretty Guardian Sailor Moon (2003), Fake Tuxedo Kamen (Ep. 9)
- Sh15uya (live-action TV) (2005), Kengo
- Garo (2005), Piano Playing Suicide Victim (Ep. 8)
- H2~Kimi to Itahibi (2005), Ootake Fumio
- Kamen Rider Kabuto (2007), Masato Mishima (Kamen Rider TheBee in Episode 16; Gryllusworm in Ep. 48 & 49)
- Kamen Rider Gaim (2013), Kiyojiro Bando
- Death Note (2015 TV series) (2015), Shuichi Aizawa
- Zero: Dragon Blood (2017), Edel
- Todome no Kiss (2018), Tsuji
- Accomplishment of Fudanshi Bartender (2022), Torii

=== Film ===
- Kamen Rider Ryuki: Episode Final (2002)
- Shibuya kaidan a.k.a. The Locker (2003)
- Shibuya kaidan 2 a.k.a. The Locker 2 (2004)
- Sakuramburu hatsu koi no sonata (2004)
- Nibanme no kanojo (2004)
- School Wars: Hero (2004)
- Koibumi-biyori (2004)
- Si-sei (2006)
- Bandage (2006)
- Kamen Rider Kabuto: God Speed Love (2006)
- Kyō Kara Hitman (2009)
- Higanjima (2010) as Ken
- Heisei Riders vs. Showa Riders: Kamen Rider Taisen feat. Super Sentai (2014)
- Futari no Uketorinin (2018)
