= Satoshi Matsuda =

Japanese actor (born 1978)

- 松田 悟志
- Born: Tomonori Masuda (益田 知紀, Masuda Tomonori); December 16, 1978 (age 47); Hirano-ku, Osaka, Osaka Prefecture, Japan
- Education: Kyoto College of Art
- Occupation: Actor
- Years active: 1998-present

Satoshi Matsuda (松田 悟志, Matsuda Satoshi; born December 16, 1978, in Hirano-ku, Osaka, Osaka Prefecture, Japan) is a Japanese actor who has appeared in a number of feature films and television series. He is affiliated with Sun Music Production.

On December 9, 2016, he apprehended a voyeur criminal whose taking photographs of his wife's skirt using a smartphone, while Matsuda and his wife were shopping in Kumiyama Town, Kyoto Prefecture and heard his wife scream because of the voyeur.

== Filmography ==
=== TV series ===
Year	Title	Role	Other notes	Ref.
2010	Ryōmaden	Hijikata Toshizō	Taiga drama	

=== Films ===
Year	Title	Role	Other notes	Ref.
2026	The Honest Realtor: The Movie			
