= List of Kamen Rider Kabuto characters =

Kamen Rider Kabuto (仮面ライダーカブト, Kamen Raidā Kabuto) is a Japanese tokusatsu series that serves as the 16th installment in the Kamen Rider franchise and the seventh entry in the Heisei era. These characters play a major role within the series and often influence many key events.

== Main characters ==
=== Souji Tendou ===
Souji Tendou (天道 総司, Tendō Sōji), birth name Souji Kusakabe (日下部 総司, Kusakabe Sōji), is a wild card and possessor of the Kabuto Zecter (カブトゼクター, Kabuto Zekutā), which he acquired on the day of the meteor along with the Rider Belt (ライダーベルト, Raidā Beruto) from the Native doppelgänger of his father Souichi Kusakabe (日下部 総一, Kusakabe Sōichi). After his parents were killed by Natives when he was three years old, Souji was taken in by his maternal grandmother and his surname was changed to Tendou. This played in Souji having a sense meant for greatness that makes him initially appear arrogant but is very compassionate. He often seems to follow monk-like philosophies of peace, using the kanji in his full name for his formal introduction; "The man who walks the path of heaven to rule everything." (天の道を往き、総てを司る男, Ten no michi o yuki, subete o tsukasadoru otoko), as well as quoting amazingly appropriate zen-like phrases he supposedly learned from his grandmother. Having no job or college education despite being very talented, Souji normally stays home with Jyuka before becoming a regular customer at Bistro La Salle after meeting Hiyori Kusakabe, whom he recognizes as both the girl he saved and a Native Worm whom he considers his little sister. This played in his ability to recognize Worms in disguise merely fights for his own needs to wipe the aliens out and provoking ZECT as a result. After defeating the Worms and ZECT's corrupted higher ups, Souji leaves Japan to travel to France.

As Kamen Rider Kabuto, Souji is usually in his pupa-like armored Masked Form (マスクドフォーム, Masukudo Fōmu) before using the Kabuto Zecter's Cast Off (キャストオフ, Kyasuto Ofu) command to assume the sleeker and more combat-oriented Rider Form (ライダーフォーム, Raidā Fōmu), which can either use the Clock Up (クロックアップ, Kurokku Appu) ability to travel at near-light speeds to match the speed of the Worms or perform the Rider Kick (ライダーキック, Raidā Kikku) finisher. He also wields the Kabuto Kunai Gun (カブトクナイガン, Kabuto Kunai Gan), which has a Gun Mode (ガンモード, Gan Mōdo) for performing the Avalanche Shoot (アバランチシュート, Abaranchi Shūto) finisher, an Axe Mode (アックスモード, Akkusu Mōdo) for performing the Avalanche Break (アバランチブレイク, Abaranchi Bureiku) finisher, and a Kunai Mode (クナイモード, Kunai Mōdo) for performing the Avalanche Slash (アバランチスラッシュ, Abaranchi Surasshu) finisher. His personal vehicle is the Kabuto Extender (カブトエクステンダー, Kabuto Ekusutendā) motorcycle, which can switch between its Honda CBR1000RR-like Masked Mode (マスクドモード, Masukudo Mōdo) and its battering ram-like Ex Mode (エクスモード, Ekusu Mōdo).

Souji later acquires the Hyper Zecter (ハイパーゼクター, Haipā Zekutā), which was created by ZECT in the future, to assume Hyper Form (ハイパーフォーム, Haipā Fōmu), also known as Kamen Rider Hyper Kabuto (仮面ライダーハイパーカブト, Kamen Raidā Haipā Kabuto), via the Hyper Cast Off (ハイパーキャストオフ, Haipā Kyasuto Ofu) command. Being an evolution of Rider Form, the Hyper Zecter enables him to either use the stronger Hyper Clock Up (ハイパークロックアップ, Haipā Kurokku Appu) ability to move at speeds great enough to potentially travel seven years through time or perform the stronger Hyper Kick (ハイパーキック, Haipā Kikku) finisher. Additionally, he wields the Perfect Zecter (パーフェクトゼクター, Pāfekuto Zekutā), which has a Sword Mode (ソードモード, Sōdo Mōdo) for performing the Hyper Blade (ハイパーブレード, Haipā Burēdo), Hyper Sting (ハイパースティング, Haipā Sutingu), and Hyper Slash (ハイパースラッシュ, Haipā Surasshu) finishers via the Kabuto, TheBee, and Sasword Zecters, respectively, and a Gun Mode for performing the Hyper Shooting (ハイパーシューティング, Haipā Shūtingu) finisher via the Drake Zecter. He can also increase the Perfect Zecter's power with the Kabuto, TheBee, Drake, and Sasword Zecters at once to perform either the Maximum Hyper Typhoon (マキシマムハイパータイフーン, Makishimamu Haipā Taifūn) finisher via Sword Mode or the Maximum Hyper Cyclone (マキシマムハイパーサイクロン, Makishimamu Haipā Saikuron) finisher via Gun Mode.

Souji Tendou is portrayed by Hiro Mizushima (水嶋 ヒロ, Mizushima Hiro). As a teenager and a child, Souji is portrayed by Sean Wiig (ショーン・ウィーグ, Shōn Wīgu) and Kōsuke Takeda (武田 航介, Takeda Kōsuke) respectively.

=== Arata Kagami ===
Arata Kagami (加賀美 新, Kagami Arata) is the son of ZECT's leader Riku Kagami, unaware of the organization's true agenda while fighting for the betterment of humanity as Kamen Rider Gatack (仮面ライダーガタック, Kamen Raidā Gatakku). Having joined ZECT to avenge his younger brother Ryo (亮, Ryō), works with Hiyori at Bistro La Salle, Arata has a good heart but is impulsive often acts without thinking. In the previous timeline, Kagami married Hiyori Kusakabe before helping Souji alter the timeline so the damage caused by the Worms' meteor would be minimized in Shibuya. In the new timeline, Arata meets Souji all over again when the latter claimed the Kabuto Zecter that he was to upon its completion. Being the only member of ZECT to know Souji's identity as Kabuto, momentarily using TheBee Zecter after Sou Yaguruma was relieved of his duty, Arata became torn between his duty to ZECT and seeing Souji as a friend.

Arata eventually acquires the Gatack Zecter (ガタックゼクター, Gatakku Zekutā) and becomes Gatack in the current timeline while learning the truth behind ZECT. They managed to wipe out most of the Worms before helping the rebels against the compromised ZECT led by Masato Mishima and the Native-class Worm leader Negishi. After ZECT was defeated, Arata started a new life with his father in the police force. During the events of Kamen Rider Zi-O, upon learning he is one of the few to remember ZECT and the Worms due to a time distortion, Arata helps the titular protagonist prevent a new Worm invasion while representing Souji. As of the events of the V-Cinema Kamen Rider Kabuto 20th: Inheritor of Heaven, he has a son, Yui, with a Worm wife he lost to an unknown illness.

As Kamen Rider Gatack, Arata is usually in his Masked Form equipped with the twin shoulder-mounted Gatack Vulcan (ガタックバルカン, Gatakku Barukan) cannons, which possess a shooting radius of 1 kilometer, before using the Gatack Zecter's Cast Off to assume Rider Form where he gains access to Clock Up and can perform the Rider Kick. He also dual wields a pair of Gatack Double Calibur (ガタックダブルカリバー, Gatakku Daburu Karibā) shotels consisting of the gold-colored Plus Calibur (プラスカリバー, Purasu Karibā) and the silver-colored Minus Calibur (マイナスカリバー, Mainasu Karibā), which can combine into a scissors-like claw that allows him to perform the Rider Cutting (ライダーカッティング, Raidā Kattingu) finisher. His personal vehicle is the Gatack Extender (ガタックエクステンダー, Gatakku Ekusutendā) motorcycle, which similar to the Kabuto Extender can switch between its Honda XR250 Motard-like Masked Mode and its hoverboard-like Ex Mode.

During the events of the Hyper Battle DVD special Kamen Rider Kabuto: Birth! Gatack Hyper Form!!, Arata acquires his own Hyper Zecter to assume Hyper Form, also known as Kamen Rider Hyper Gatack (仮面ライダーハイパーガタック, Kamen Raidā Haipā Gatakku), via Hyper Clock Up.

Arata Kagami is portrayed by Yuki Sato (佐藤 祐基, Satō Yūki).

=== Hiyori Kusakabe ===
Hiyori Kusakabe (日下部 ひより, Kusakabe Hiyori) is first shown as a co-worker of Arata's at the Bistro la Salle. She was involved in the meteor crash seven years ago along with Souji. Due to the accident, her parents were killed. She believed that they were murdered by a person wearing a Rider Belt, but after a period of uncertainty she concludes that Souji, despite owning the belt, would never do something like that. After seeing Gatack wear another belt and discovering that he was Arata, she also began to doubt him. In the end however, she decides to trust both of them as they have helped her so much. She carries a green crystal that originated from Area X, ground zero of the meteor crash. She seems to be able to talk with and read the emotions of inanimate objects, such as drawings and machines. She's quite clumsy and tends to zone out while working, resulting in complaints by customers. Through several mishaps and accidents, she was able to discover the identities of all the Riders besides Drake. Later in the series, it was discovered that Hiyori is the child of a Native Worm who impersonated Souji's mother down to her pregnancy, and later gave birth to the Sisyra Worm (シシーラワーム, Shishīra Wāmu). This technically makes her Souji's younger sister. During episode 33, the energy charge from the Hyper Zecter sent her along with the Native doppelgänger of Souji to the edge of time and space. The Hyper Zecter later appeared in the normal dimension, showing one of Hiyori's drawings to Souji and Arata.

She reappeared during episode 38, being led away by the doppelgänger, at the edge of time and space. She returns to the real world in episode 43 to defend Dark Kabuto from Hyper Kabuto, stating that she no longer desires to live in the human world. Ultimately however, after a compelling speech by Souji saying that she will not be hated in the human world, even though she is a Worm, she abandons the doppelgänger and returns to the human world. However, she is then attacked by Dark Kabuto. After being saved by Souji, she returns to an almost normal life, and begins making her own menu and dream of owning a restaurant come true. During the epilogue, she returns to her normal life in working at the Bistro la Salle, and now has Jyuka as a sister. As a human, she is 18 years old.

Hiyori Kusakabe is portrayed by Yui Satonaka (里中 唯, Satonaka Yui). As a child, Hiyori is portrayed by Reina Fujii (藤井 玲奈, Fujii Reina).

== Recurring characters ==
=== Jyuka Tendou ===
13-year-old Jyuka Tendou (天道 樹花, Tendō Juka) is presented as Souji's younger sister, but in truth seems to be adopted. They were both taken in by their grandmother after the Shibuya meteorite crash. She's really close to Souji, whom she calls "older brother", and tends to act the same way he does, such as talking about her grandmother and pointing to the sky. She was injured in a car crash caused by Kamishiro, but blows it off to her brother's concern. She also assists her brother in running noodle carts across town. She has different ways of saying "Good Morning" to Souji and loves his cooking. Lately, she has been targeted by ZECT and the Worms. So far, two Worms, disguised as Misaki and Daisuke, have tried to either kidnap or kill her.

She seems to eventually becomes aware of the Zecters when the Kabuto, TheBee, and Drake Zecters begin to fly around the entire Tendou household, while the Sasword Zecter crawls on the dining table. During the epilogue, it is shown that she has accepted Hiyori as her "sister" and is now working with her at the Bistro la Selle.

Jyuka Tendou is portrayed by Natsumi Okumura (奥村 夏未, Okumura Natsumi).

=== Yumiko Takemiya ===
Hiyori and Arata's 36-year-old boss at the Bistro la Salle restaurant, Yumiko Takemiya (竹宮 弓子, Takemiya Yumiko) seems to tolerate Hiyori's clumsiness and Arata's tardiness. She sometimes requests Tendou to be her cook as he is a usual customer.

Yumiko Takemiya is portrayed by Megumi Nishimuta (西牟田 恵, Nishimuta Megumi).

=== Daisuke Kazama ===
Daisuke Kazama (風間 大介, Kazama Daisuke) is a metrosexual make-up artist who openly befriends women, seeing them as the treasure of life. His partner, a little girl named Gon, always follows him around, completing sentences for him since Daisuke seems to be in eloquent at times. Prior to his first appearance, he accidentally found the means to become Kamen Rider Drake (仮面ライダードレイク, Kamen Raidā Doreiku).

Utilizing the Drake Zecter (ドレイクゼクター, Doreiku Zekutā) in conjunction with the Drake Grip (ドレイクグリップ, Doreiku Gurippu), Daisuke can transform into Kamen Rider Drake. While his Masked Form grants underwater breathing capabilities, he can assume Rider Form via the Drake Zecter's Cast Off to either access Clock Up or perform the Rider Shooting (ライダーシューティング, Raidā Shūtingu) finisher.

Daisuke Kazama is portrayed by Kazuki Kato (加藤 和樹, Katō Kazuki).

=== Gon ===
Gon (ゴン), real name Yuriko Takayama (高山 百合子, Takayama Yuriko), is an 8-year-old girl whom Daisuke has accompanied. She seems to have amnesia, but at the beginning of episode 17 she slowly remembers time before she met Daisuke. Gon also pictures her mother Junko (順子), but cannot make out who it is. She always completes Kazama's sentences for him, usually after make-up sessions. She is incredibly mature for her age, often taking initiatives which surprise even Souji. In the end, after remembering her mother's face on the day that they were attacked at the bus by the same Worm that tried to kill her mother, she was finally reunited with her mother. Drake killed the Worm and Gon completely remembered her past, but unfortunately forgot about Daisuke and treated him as a complete stranger afterwards. However, she regained her memories of being Gon while reading an article on Daisuke in a teen magazine. She also helps Daisuke regain his Drake Zecter from his Worm imitation. She recently discovered the identities of the first five Riders when they ganged up on Daisuke, who they believed was a Worm. In her latest appearance, she has given the Drake Grip to Souji after stealing it from Daisuke. She returns to help both Daisuke and Rena with the Hopper Riders by spraying them with a fire extinguisher. However, when Rena regains her Worm memories, Gon is attacked by her. During the epilogue, she is still working with Daisuke, although she insists that she now be called Yuriko. As of the events of the V-Cinema Kamen Rider Kabuto 20th: Inheritor of Heaven, she has become a popular actress under the stage name Yuri Gonda (権田 ゆり, Gonda Yuri) and is married.

Gon is portrayed by Airu Kanzaki (神崎 愛瑠, Kanzaki Airu). As an adult, Gon is portrayed by Fumika Baba (馬場 ふみか, Baba Fumika).

=== Tsurugi Kamishiro ===
Tsurugi Kamishiro (神代 剣, Kamishiro Tsurugi) is a direct descendant of the noble English Descabil line, calling himself "The man who wields a sword in God's place." (神に代わって剣を振るう男, Kami ni kawatte ken o furuu otoko) in his introductions. He is Souji's equal in everything but cooking and normal social skills, quoting his butler Jiiya while expressing his intent to be the best at everything. But Tsurugi is unaware that he is actually the Scorpio Worm (スコルピオワーム, Sukorupio Wāmu), a Worm that killed the real Tsurugi and assumed his form while killing the man's older sister Mika (美香). However, the Scorpio Worm's mind was completely overridden by the real Tsurugi's memories, believing himself to be Tsurugi while haunted by Mika's death to the point of disassociating himself as a Worm while vowing to kill them all. Jiiya kept Tsurugi in the dark of his true identity as the Kamishiro fortune had severely dwindled, with the latter becoming ZECT's hired exterminator as Kamen Rider Sasword (仮面ライダーサソード, Kamen Raidā Sasōdo). While Tsurugi is let go after Arata becomes Gattack, he aids Souji after realizing Jiiya was teaching him to be a better person and the ways of noblesse oblige. Eventually learning of his true nature as a Worm, a despairing Tsurugi aligns himself with the Worms to lead an all-out attack against the ZECT Kamen Riders. But this would turn out to be Tsurugi's plan to fulfill his promise by leading the Worms to slaughter, allowing Souji to fatally wound him with the Maximum Hyper Typhoon so Mika can be avenged before returning to his mansion to die in peace.

Utilizing the Sasword Zecter (サソードゼクター, Sasōdo Zekutā), which quells his Worm instincts, in conjunction with the Sasword Yaiver (サソードヤイバー, Sasōdo Yaibā) katana, Tsurugi can transform into Kamen Rider Sasword. While his Masked Form is equipped with a series of Blood Vessel (ブラッドベセル, Buraddo Beseru) tubes that supply performance enhancing chemicals, he can assume Rider Form via the Sasword Zecter's Cast Off to either access Clock Up or perform the Rider Slash (ライダースラッシュ, Raidā Surashhu) finisher.

Tsurugi Kamishiro is portrayed by Yusuke Yamamoto (山本 裕典, Yamamoto Yūsuke).

=== Jiiya ===
A 65-year-old butler who serves the Kamishiro family, Jiiya (じいや) serves Tsurugi and often acts as a parental figure to him. He remains loyal to Kamishiro despite many of his rude actions. It seems that the Kamishiro wealth is no more, but Jiiya hides this fact from Tsurugi, finding ways to get money such as getting monetary reward for Sasword's killing of Worms, and after that transaction was cancelled, opening a ramen shop (which Souji decides to take over as he sees Jiiya as too worthy to be doing this). He tells Arata about Tsurugi's sister and her death at the hands of the Scorpio Worm. He has a younger twin brother who keeps the Legendary White Knife. He knows that the Scorpio Worm is Tsurugi's true form, but has chosen not to tell him because Tsurugi as the last of the famous British Discabil family must, in one form or another, carry on its name. Jiiya is respected by Souji who refers to him as "Humanity's Treasure" due to his incredible skill as a chef. He has several students who hold him and high respect, and has published a cook book, which Souji carries a copy of at all times. During the epilogue, it is revealed that he is the head cook for the Discabil Restaurant, which is owned by Misaki and named in his master's honor.

Jiiya is portrayed by Yasukiyo Umeno (梅野 泰靖, Umeno Yasukiyo).

=== Souji Tendou (Native) ===
The Native doppelgänger of Souji Tendou is a man who utilizes the Dark Kabuto Zecter (ダークカブトゼクター, Dāku Kabuto Zekutā) to transform into Kamen Rider Dark Kabuto (仮面ライダーダークカブト, Kamen Raidā Dāku Kabuto). This mimic version of Souji was actually a human infant that was captured by Mishima and used for his experiments after being turned into a Native.

Similarly to Kamen Rider Kabuto, the doppelgänger is usually in his Masked Form before assuming Rider Form via the Dark Kabuto Zecter's Cast Off.

Hiro Mizushima, who already portrays Souji Tendou, also portrays his doppelgänger counterpart.

=== ZECT ===
ZECT (ゼクト, Zekuto) is a mysterious organization seemingly dedicated to destroying Worms, later revealed to have been founded by Native Worms who created both ZECT and the Masked Rider System (マスクドライダーシステム, Masukudo Raidā Shisutemu) composed of Zecter (ゼクター, Zekutā) support robots to eliminate the Worms before conducting Negishi's own plans for humanity.

==== Shuichi Tadokoro ====
Yuzuki and Arata's 35-year-old direct superior in the field, Shuichi Tadokoro (田所 修一, Tadokoro Shūichi) is a very stern man who commands numerous ZECT Trooper platoons. It is hinted at that he was once the mentor of the first TheBee, Sou Yaguruma. He was seriously injured when he tried to use the Gatack Zecter in order to save Arata from being chosen. Despite his appearance, he does care a great deal about his team, especially Arata and Yuzuki and will do anything to help them. He has a younger brother who runs the buckwheat-noodle restaurant which was once his father's business. Although he was the better cook, his brother inherited it anyway. After shielding Arata, it became clear in episode 41 that his true form is a Native Worm. However, he has no intention of conquering humanity like Negishi. During the epilogue, it is shown that he has taken over the running of the aforementioned family business. During the events of the V-Cinema Kamen Rider Kabuto 20th: Inheritor of Heaven, he sacrifices himself to help Yui Kagami escape from the Worm doppelgänger of Mishima.

Shuichi Tadokoro is portrayed by Yoshiyuki Yamaguchi (山口 祥行, Yamaguchi Yoshiyuki).

==== Yuzuki Misaki ====
A 23-year-old technician and agent for ZECT, Yuzuki Misaki (岬 祐月, Misaki Yuzuki) travels with Arata in the field tracking the movements of the Worms. Later on, she is given the assignment to track Souji and the stolen Kabuto Zecter. At first she is a "by-the-book" tough as nails character; however, she soon begins to question the actions of ZECT and eventually gains respect for Souji after he rescues her from the Worms. However, she was still irritated by Souji when he implies that she and Arata make a cute couple. She used herself as bait by disguising herself as Phantom Thief Shadow and tended to Arata when the Gatack Zecter attacked him. She loves buckwheat soba, and can chow down entire ramen bowls in seconds. A Worm disguised as her was sent to attack Souji's sister, but ended up meeting Tsurugi. The Worm reminded Tsurugi of his dead sister, but he ended up destroying the Worm. However, because of this, he gained a strong attraction to Yuzuki. As the series progressed, Yuzuki slowly began to reciprocate to Tsurugi's feelings, and accepted his request to spend Christmas Day with him. Unfortunately, Tsurugi became aware of the fact he was the Scorpio Worm and was eventually destroyed in battle by Kabuto, despite Misaki's pleas to stop. During the epilogue, Yuzuki becomes the head of Tsurugi's corporation to honor his name.

Yuzuki Misaki is portrayed by Anna Nagata (永田 杏奈, Nagata Anna).

==== Kamen Rider TheBee ====
Kamen Rider TheBee (仮面ライダーザビー, Kamen Raidā Zabī) is a moniker of Riders who transform by utilizing the TheBee Zecter (ザビーゼクター, Zabī Zekutā) in conjunction with the Rider Brace (ライダーブレス, Raidā Buresu). Like the other ZECT Kamen Riders, they usually first assume their beehive-like Masked Form before entering Rider Form via the TheBee Zecter's Cast Off to either access Clock Up or perform the Rider Sting (ライダースティング, Raidā Sutingu) finisher.

===== Sou Yaguruma =====
Sou Yaguruma (矢車 想, Yaguruma Sō) is a former ZECT agent who was the first user of the TheBee Zecter, having commanded his personal army of ZECT Troopers called Shadow (シャドー, Shadō) during his time as the first Kamen Rider TheBee. A perfectionist believing in a philosophy known as "Perfect Harmony" (完全調和, Kanzen Chōwa), his composure and strict teamwork ethic conceal his arrogance and temper, which Souji exploited to reveal a security flaw within his group. Sou's obsession with taking out Souji resulted in the TheBee Zecter abandoning him for his former subordinate Shun Kageyama, who fires him instead of keeping him in Shadow as an advisor. This led Sou into insanity as he developed a morbid ideology, later resurfacing as Kamen Rider Kick Hopper (仮面ライダーキックホッパー, Kamen Raidā Kikku Hoppā) after acquiring a two-in-one Hopper Zecter (ホッパーゼクター, Hoppā Zekutā) as he attacks Worms and Kamen Riders alike. After bringing Shun under his wing once more, Sou attempts to stir his partner on to see things as he does, seeing as how Shun is only setting himself up for a fall at the slightest glimmer of hope while expressing a bit of envy because he can no longer feel any emotion. After all of the enemy Worms are wiped out, Sou puts a mutating Shun out of his misery while seeking to honor his promise for them to see the northern lights. During the events of Kamen Rider Zi-O, Sou opposes the titular protagonist by becoming an Another Rider to protect the new invading Worms so he can fulfill his promise with one that assumed Shun's form. As of the events of the V-Cinema Kamen Rider Kabuto 20th: Inheritor of Heaven, he returned to ZECT as the user of the TheBee Zecter, only to be kicked out and replaced by Ryo Oga later by his subordinates who are actually Worms. During the final battle, he switches from his Kick Hopper form to his late partner's Punch Hopper form to assist Drake in destroying Oga.

Utilizing the Hopper Zecter's green-colored half in conjunction with the ZECT Buckle (ゼクトバックル, Zekuto Bakkuru) belt, Sou can transform into Kamen Rider Kick Hopper. While transformed, he gains the use of the Rider Jump (ライダージャンプ, Raidā Janpu) ability. He is also equipped with the Anchor Jack (アンカージャッキ, Ankā Jakki) joint on his left leg, which allows him to perform the Rider Kick.

Sou Yaguruma is portrayed by Hidenori Tokuyama (徳山 秀典, Tokuyama Hidenori).

===== Shun Kageyama =====
Shun Kageyama (影山 瞬, Kageyama Shun) is a former ZECT member under Sou who was the third and primary user of the TheBee Zecter until he got kicked out of ZECT. Since then, he formed a partnership with his former leader after receiving his own Hopper Zecter from him and becoming Kamen Rider Punch Hopper (仮面ライダーパンチホッパー, Kamen Raidā Panchi Hoppā).

Utilizing the Hopper Zecter's brown-colored half in conjunction with the ZECT Buckle, Shun can transform into Kamen Rider Punch Hopper. While transformed, he gains the use of the Rider Jump. He is also equipped with the Anchor Jack on his right arm, which allows him to perform the Rider Punch (ライダーパンチ, Raidā Panchi) finisher.

Shun Kageyama is portrayed by Masato Uchiyama (内山 眞人, Uchiyama Masato).

===== Masato Mishima =====
The aide of ZECT HQ's leader, Riku Kagami. At times, Masato Mishima (三島 正人, Mishima Masato) does communicate with Sou and Tadokoro to brief the ZECT teams about the Worms. Eventually, he was upset with Sou botching a mission and Tadokoro questioning him about ZECT's agenda. There's implication that he has no faith in Shun as TheBee, despite the latter being loyal to ZECT and is looked down upon by Tsurugi Kamishiro. He has no sense of taste, and finishes eating by taking a supplement. He forcefully became TheBee at one point despite the TheBee Zecter's attempt to reject him. He truly thinks Shun is an eyesore because he can only complain and has lost the TheBee Zecter. He also seems to have a connection to Rena Mamiya/Uca Worm and had always kept the Hyper Zecter with him. Renge manages to steal the case with the Hyper Zecter, but the Uca Worm takes it back only to find that the case has been rigged with a bomb. Mishima tries to destroy the Hyper Zecter with the bomb. After the explosion, he taunts Souji for failing to obtain the Hyper Zecter, so he saved the Hyper Zecter when he used Clock-Up. However, he doesn't realize the power of the Zecter as it manages to finds its way to Souji, much to his chagrin. He then tosses his glasses to the ground in anger. He gradually loses respect for Riku Kagami's servile manner toward the Natives. After realizing Negishi found out about the Red-Shoes system, he makes a pact with Negishi and overthrows Riku Kagami as leader of ZECT. Using the Natives' pendants, he regains the ability to assume his true form, the Gryllus Worm (グリラスワーム, Gurirasu Wāmu), the strongest Native. He is defeated by Kabuto and Gatack, and then destroyed by the meteorite explosion that obliterated the studio set.

During the events of the V-Cinema Kamen Rider Kabuto 20th: Inheritor of Heaven, a Worm doppelgänger of Mishima serves as the leader of ZECT, which has been taken over by Worms, and utilizes the Giraffa Zecter (ギラファゼクター, Girafa Zekutā) in conjunction with the Rider Belt to transform into Kamen Rider Giraffa (仮面ライダーギラファ, Kamen Raidā Girafa). The doppelgänger is destroyed by Kamen Rider Atlas.

Masato Mishima is portrayed by Tomohisa Yuge (弓削 智久, Yuge Tomohisa).

==== Riku Kagami ====
Riku Kagami (加賀美 陸, Kagami Riku), father of Arata and Ryo, is a 52-year-old high-ranked official in ZECT, and serves as a figurehead to hide their connection to the Natives. Arata seems to despise him because of Ryo's disappearance, as well as the lack of concern or activity done in order to find Ryo. Arata is also unaware that his father is even part of the organization, ZECT, let alone the leader. A mysterious person who always quotes animal bibles, he is also the chief of police. He is a highly trained fencer and plays the cello. It seems that he has a very secret agenda and would even sacrifice his sons to achieve his goals. Souji later confronted Riku; the confrontation ended with Riku telling him that Souji's sister (actually refers to Hiyori, not Jyuka) was not in good hands, which naturally made Souji lose his composure, and Riku walked off, joking about Souji's "walking down the path to heaven to rule over all".

During the end of episode 36, he displays that he indeed knows about the Hopper Riders, saying they have opened the Gates of Hell. He also says the Rider's grand plan will be completed by our sons, showing that he did indeed know Souji's father. He tells Arata of the secrets behind the Masked Rider System in episode 41, displaying his knowledge of the Natives and how they created the system. He also tells Souji that his father was the one who installed the Red Shoes system in the Zecters, and in turn, Souji decides to trust him because he too desires to walk the path his father took. He is overthrown from his leadership position at ZECT by Mishima after revealing to Negishi the Red-Shoes system implemented into the Zecters. He is still alive in the epilogue watching his son grow up. It is likely he is now simply the chief of police. As of the events of the V-Cinema Kamen Rider Kabuto 20th: Inheritor of Heaven, he has become the Prime Minister of Japan.

Riku Kagami is portrayed by Hirotaro Honda (本田 博太郎, Honda Hirotarō).

==== Renge Takatori ====
Formerly a BrighTrooper, Renge Takatori (高鳥 蓮華, Takatori Renge) is an 18-year-old trainee of ZECT and Souji's second in command who was sent by Mishima in order to spy on and assassinate Souji. However, she yearns for Souji as a master after she tasted his delicious cooking. Prior to meeting Souji, she had eaten nothing but dry boiled rice for the last seven years of her life, considering the concept of taste and deliciousness a sin. Souji went out of the way to make sure she would be well fed. She was also the person that booted Shun out from the ZECT HQ. Afterwards, Mishima orders her to kill Souji, but Souji persuades her to forget Mishima and help him steal the Hyper Zecter. She is eventually knocked over the building by the Uca Worm only to be saved by Souji. Despite her sweet and innocent demeanor, she is a fearsome fighter who wields a wire that can cut through almost anything; however, she is still relatively weak against Worms, but tries to fight anyway. After accepting Souji as her superior, she began to work at the Bistro la Salle, although she often misinterpreted recipes and created horrible dishes as a result. Due to her harsh bring up as a BrighTrooper, her perception of training is rough. This was seen in Episode 38 when she began to time Jyuka and her classmates in setting up tents before their camping field trip. She was hit by a bullet that ricocheted off Kabuto's Kunai Gun, but hitting her in the shoulder. As an apology, Souji made a meal for her while she was recovering in the hospital, also giving her a letter to Arata. During the epilogue, Renge continues to work at the Bistro la Salle.

Renge Takatori is portrayed by Yuka Teshima (手嶋 ゆか, Teshima Yuka).

==== Negishi ====
One of the leaders of the Natives, Negishi (根岸) seems like a fun loving person despite the deep respect ZECT offers to him. When he first meets Souji, he almost admires Souji, asking if he can be his fan. Despite his innocent look, Negishi actually has his own agenda and later carries it out once the Worms had been almost decimated. Believing Natives and humans would be unable to co-exist, Negishi sets up the plan to turn all of humanity into Native and thus achieve his ideal peace. To that, he placed Mishima as leader of ZECT and disposes Riku Kagami. But Negishi didn't count on Souji's words to sway his comrades to have second thoughts of his plan. In the end, Dark Kabuto manages to capture him, dragging him inside the TV studio explosion that killed them off.

Negishi is portrayed by Masahiro Kobayashi (小林 正寛, Kobayashi Masahiro).

==== ZECTroopers ====
ZECTroopers (ゼクトルーパー, Zekutorūpā) are foot soldiers of the organization ZECT, they wield the Machine Gun Blade (マシンガンブレード, Mashin Gan Burēdo), a weapon that draws some concepts from Riderman's Machine Gun Arm and Power Arm. The weapon consists of an automatic machine gun with a retractable blade, which they use for close-quarters combat. In addition, they also carry a grenade launcher-like shotgun as a last resort and means of retreating, also they use flash bombs which disable Worms and seem to prevent them from molting. Like the Riotroopers from Kamen Rider 555, they're only Rider-like, acting as cannon fodder for emergencies when a Rider cannot arrive in time. They are transported to the Worm hotspots via black, white, or silver HUMVEEs. Unfortunately, as seen in the first episode, they lack any concern for civilians. The special team known as Shadow (シャドー, Shadō) assists Kamen Rider TheBee. Unlike regular ZECTroopers, they have yellow pin stripes on their uniforms. Shadow is able to prevent the Worms from molting, enabling TheBee to kill them. During a training mission, the ZECTrooper trainees, BrighTroopers (ブライトルーパー, Buraitorūpā), are revealed. They wear white armor instead of the standard black. During episode 41, the AM bomb is revealed, forcing current Worms disguised as humans back into their original forms. It's revealed that the majority of ZECTroopers are Native Worms. However, after a speech by Souji, they turn on Negishi and Mishima, aiding the Riders.

=== Worms ===
The Worms (ワーム, Wāmu) are arthropod-themed alien lifeforms that came from a meteor that devastated the city district of Shibuya seven years prior to the series' current timeline, the meteor being part of a larger one that greatly devastated Earth in the previous timeline depicted in the film God Speed Love. The Worms are motivated to subvert and replace the population of an area they invade, possessing the ability to replicate the appearance and memories of another being whom they kill off. Worms believe that the original will live on as a part of them, since they adopt their victim's personality traits. But there are setbacks to this process as the Worms are unable to fully replicate aspects of their victims like their scent and can forced into their true forms through certain chemicals like makeup, few having his minds overridden by the memories of the identity they stole. The most basic of the Worms are Salis Worms (サリスワーム, Sarisu Wāmu), green chrysalis-like creatures with an albino variant called a Mutation Salis (ミューテーションサリス, Myūtēshon Sarisu). When threatened or endangered, a Salis Worm molts into a stronger form that can move at blinding speeds which comes from their high metabolism.

It would later be revealed that the current Worms are the second group to reach Earth, a previous group of Worms called Natives (ネイティブ, Neitibu) came to Earth 35 years ago before the events of the series. Unlike their aggressive kin, the Natives learned to co-exist with humans with some creating their own human identities. They are also the ones who developed the Masked Rider System and ZECT for the purpose of fighting off the Worms.

==== Rena Mamiya ====
Her true form is the Uca Worm (ウカワーム, Uka Wāmu), the first executive Worm. A cruel and clever planner, Rena Mamiya (間宮 麗奈, Mamiya Rena) is the one who ordered a Worm to capture (or kill) Jyuka. In Worm form, she is very powerful and on her debut, she defeated both TheBee and Drake. She is also the only Worm to "truly" defeat Souji and make him involuntarily power down. Soon after, she discovers the existence of the Hyper Zecter and attempts to retrieve it after she shoved Renge off a building. Despite retrieving the suitcase, Mishima sets off a bomb which seemingly destroys the Hyper Zecter. Despite the massive explosion, her Worm form was apparently enough to handle and survive the explosion.

The Uca Worm's human form is a 25-year-old woman always dressed in black. In episode 39, she is hit by Hyper Kabuto's Hyper Sting, causing amnesia with the persona of the very woman she imitated. The original Rena was a talented singer with a kind heart that wanted to help people. Believing herself to be Rena, she chases after her dream of being an opera singer until her Worm persona eventually resurfaced. She is able to sing one more requiem for Daisuke on stage, expressing her gratitude to him. Ultimately, she is fatally wounded by Kamen Rider Drake using his Rider Shooting twice in their final battle, ending with the Uca Worm ultimately dying in Daisuke's arms as a human.

Rena Mamiya is portrayed by Hitomi Miwa (三輪 ひとみ, Miwa Hitomi).

==== Reiji Nogi ====
Reiji Nogi (乃木 怜治, Nogi Reiji) is the boss class of the Worm army. He is dressed in a black trench coat and wields a cane which he uses in battle. Possessing uncanny martial art skills, he is powerful enough to take on Arata and Souji in his human form, while they are in their Rider forms. His first form, Cassis Worm Dimidius (カッシスワーム・ディミディウス, Kasshisu Wāmu Dimidiusu), has the capability of "Freeze", which is activated by clenching his left fist. Through this, he can completely stop the flow of time to the point in which even the power of Hyper Clock Up is purposeless. During his debut, he is able to completely neutralize Hyper Kabuto, even with the Perfect Zecter. He then later was destroyed by Hyper Kabuto's Maximum Hyper Cyclone. After his demise, he evolved into a stronger form Cassis Worm Gladius (カッシスワーム・グラディウス, Kasshisu Wāmu Guradiusu) by use of the ability, "Life of Immortality". In this form, he is able to absorb Worms and tachyon energy alike to gain their powers as shown when he absorbs two subordinate Worms and Gatack's Rider Kick. He later absorbs Sasword's Rider Slash, TheBee's Rider Sting, and Gatack's Rider Cutting; but failed to absorb a triple Rider Kick by Kabuto, Gatack, and Kick Hopper. He then later was destroyed by Hyper Kabuto's Maximum Hyper Cyclone. After his demise, he evolved split into two entities and assumes a new form of Cassis Worm Clipeus (カッシスワーム・クリペウス, Kasshisu Wāmu Kuripeusu). When Tsurugi's Worm identity exposed, the Nogis tried to recruit the Scorpio Worm as one of their minions, but instead the Scorpio Worm turned them into his minions after showing he was superior to them in power. Ultimately, they face defeat after being destroyed by Gatack, Kick Hopper, and Punch Hopper.

Reiji Nogi is portrayed by Tak Sakaguchi (坂口 拓, Sakaguchi Taku).

== Spin-off exclusive characters ==
=== Yui Kagami ===
Yui Kagami (加賀美 結, Kagami Yui) is Arata's human-Worm hybrid son who appears exclusively in the V-Cinema Kamen Rider Kabuto 20th: Inheritor of Heaven. During the final battle, he becomes Kamen Rider Kabuto.

Yui Kagami is portrayed by Towa Araki (荒木 飛羽, Araki Towa).

=== Hikaru Tendou ===
Hikaru Tendou (天道 ヒカル, Tendō Hikaru) is Souji's possible daughter who appears exclusively in the V-Cinema Kamen Rider Kabuto 20th: Inheritor of Heaven. She behaves just like Souji, calling herself "The divine light who walks the path of heaven to rule everything." (天の道を往き、総てを司る神の光, Ten no michi o yuki, subete o tsukasadoru kami no hikari) in her introductions.

Utilizing the Atlas Zecter (アトラスゼクター, Atorasu Zekutā) in conjunction with the Rider Belt, Hikaru can transform into Kamen Rider Atlas (仮面ライダーアトラス, Kamen Raidā Atorasu).

Hikaru Tendou is portrayed by Yuika Kodera (小寺 結花, Kodera Yuika).

=== Ryo Oga ===
Ryo Oga (大賀 亮, Ōga Ryō) is a Worm and the fifth user of the TheBee Zecter who appears exclusively in the V-Cinema Kamen Rider Kabuto 20th: Inheritor of Heaven. He is destroyed by Drake and Sou as Punch Hopper.

Unlike other users of the TheBee Zecter, Oga can perform the Rider Kick.

Ryo Oga is portrayed by Yuu Machida (町田 悠宇, Machida Yuu).
