= List of Kamen Rider Kabuto episodes =

Kamen Rider Kabuto is the 2006 edition of the Kamen Rider Series, and the 35th anniversary of the whole series'. Lasting for 49 episodes, the first episode of Kamen Rider Kabuto aired on January 29, 2006, and the finale aired on January 21, 2007.

== Episodes ==
No.	Title	Directed by	Written by	Original release date
1	"The Strongest Man"; Transliteration: "Saikyō Otoko" (Japanese: 最強男)	Hidenori Ishida	Shōji Yonemura	January 29, 2006
Kagami Arata, member of ZECT, meets Souji Tendou, who has been training his entire life waiting for the Kabuto Zecter. As a Worm attacks a young girl, Kagami attempts to call the Kabuto Zecter but it flies to the hands of the strange man, Souji Tendou.
2	"The First Two-Step Transformation"; Transliteration: "Hatsu Ni-dan Henshin" (Japanese: 初2段変身)	Hidenori Ishida	Shōji Yonemura	February 5, 2006
Tendou uses the second form of Kabuto, known as "Rider Form" by using a process called "Cast Off". Kagami tries to understand Tendou and why he believes he is destined to be great.
3	"I Am Justice!!"; Transliteration: "Ore wa Seigi!!" (Japanese: 俺が正義!!)	Naoki Tamura	Shōji Yonemura	February 12, 2006
A woman named Yuki is attacked by the Lanpyris Worm and impersonated, but she survives so now there are two Yukis running around. More intrigue between Tendo & Kagami, who is quickly falling out of favor with ZECT, plus a fight between Kabuto and a new kind of Worm at an amusement park.
4	"Love Explanation!!"; Transliteration: "Ai o Toku!!" (Japanese: 愛を説く!!)	Naoki Tamura	Shōji Yonemura	February 19, 2006
Kagami must face the tough truth about the person his younger brother really is. Tendou confronts Kagami and tells him that he will defeat all Worms, including Kagami's brother, Bellcricetus Worm. In the end, Kagami is left with the toughest choice of his life.
5	"Order to Capture!!"; Transliteration: "Hokaku Shirei!!" (Japanese: 捕獲指令!!)	Takao Nagaishi	Shōji Yonemura	February 26, 2006
The connection between Hiyori and Tendou is seemingly discovered as Tendou makes a promise to Hiyori that he might have to break after ZECT discovers the identity of Kabuto.
6	"My Flower"; Transliteration: "Ore-sama no Hana" (Japanese: オレ様の花)	Takao Nagaishi	Shōji Yonemura	March 5, 2006
Tendou plans his escape from ZECT with the help of Kagami. After escaping, Kagami is sent to meet Hiyori and Tendou must defeat two Worm that are impersonating ZECT members.
7	"#2 Appears"; Transliteration: "Ni-gō Shin Tōjō" (Japanese: ２号新登場)	Hidenori Ishida	Shōji Yonemura	March 12, 2006
Sou Yaguruma, also known as Kamen Rider TheBee, arrives from ZECT HQ with his own ZECT Tropper team known as Shadow. Kagami warns Tendou to stay out of ZECT affairs now that a new Kamen Rider is here. After saving a wedding and fighting a pair of Worm, TheBee then asks Kabuto about joining them and ZECT, but Kabuto refuses, resulting in a showdown between the Riders.
8	"Angry Tofu"; Transliteration: "Ikareru Tōfu" (Japanese: 怒れる豆腐)	Hidenori Ishida	Shōji Yonemura	March 19, 2006
Due to being upstaged by Tendou, Yaguruma loses his cool and begins trying to defeat Kabuto once and for all. After seemingly destroying the Zect Belt, Hiyori remembers more about her past and the boy that had a rider belt.
9	"The Bee's Insanity!!"; Transliteration: "Hachi no Ranshin!!" (Japanese: 蜂の乱心!!)	Naoki Tamura	Shōji Yonemura	March 26, 2006
Yaguruma discovers that Tendou is alive and well, and so is the Zect Belt. Furious, he and Tendou fight once again, but this time, Yaguruma goes insane and injures his fellow comrades in the process. Ideals lost, the TheBee Zecter leaves him for Kagami Arata.
10	"I'm Not Your Friend"; Transliteration: "Tomo ja Nee" (Japanese: 友じゃねぇ)	Naoki Tamura	Shōji Yonemura	April 2, 2006
Kagami basks in the power of the TheBee Zecter and the new position of Shadow's captain. However, his mission is to defeat Kabuto and after fighting him, Kagami realizes that there is something far more important to him than being a Rider. After this, he gives up the TheBee Zecter along with the title of Kamen Rider TheBee.
11	"The Party Burns"; Transliteration: "Gōkon Moyu" (Japanese: 合コン燃ゆ)	Ryuta Tasaki	Toshiki Inoue	April 9, 2006
Tendou constantly tells Kagami that he has forgotten something important. Kagami does not understand this, but after being saved from a Worm, Tendou asks him why he joined ZECT. Kagami, still puzzled, watches in shock as Kazama Daisuke, a makeup artist, transforms into Kamen Rider Drake.
12	"The Makeup Thousand-Man Cut"; Transliteration: "Keshō Sen-nin Giri" (Japanese: 化粧千人斬)	Ryuta Tasaki	Toshiki Inoue	April 16, 2006
Tendou and Daisuke have a contest to see who can get the most girls to follow them in one day. Despite that Tendou did nothing but scratch cards all day, he wins the contest as all the girls collected by Daisuke run to Tendou because they all know who he is. Kagami finally realizes that Tendou was trying to tell him to remember his promise to fight Worms.
13	"The Team Dissolves"; Transliteration: "Chīmu Kaisan" (Japanese: チーム解散)	Takao Nagaishi	Shōji Yonemura	April 23, 2006
Yaguruma returns with a new vigor and is determined to protect Shadow because someone has been killing off Shadow members one by one. Kageyama believed it to be Yaguruma who was doing the betrayal, but in the end this was proven false. However, Kageyama is now the user chosen to be Kamen Rider TheBee.
14	"Back of the Back of the Back"; Transliteration: "Ura no Ura no Ura" (Japanese: 裏の裏の裏)	Takao Nagaishi	Shōji Yonemura	April 30, 2006
Kagami is marked as the traitor by Kageyama, and is chased across town by the entire team of Shadow. This seemingly perfect case is broken when Kageyama reveals that he was just using Kagami as bait to lure out the real traitor. A Zect operative shoots Kagami who is saved by Tendou at the last second, who reveals that one of Kageyama's troops is actually the traitor, the only one who could see him when he Clocked Up to save Kagami. In the end Drake, TheBee, and Kabuto have a three-way battle.
15	"The Monster Noted Doctor!?"; Transliteration: "Kaijin Meii!?" (Japanese: 怪人名医!?)	Nobuhiro Suzumura	Toshiki Inoue	May 7, 2006
Kagami feels betrayed by ZECT and takes a leave to try and solve his own mission. Drake and Kabuto secretly back him up and they discover that there are multiple Worms impersonating the same person, and they do not try to kill each other. Tendou joins ZECT in order to find out more about this, and automatically becomes Shadow's leader.
16	"An Impossible Storm"; Transliteration: "Masaka no Arashi" (Japanese: まさかの嵐)	Nobuhiro Suzumura	Toshiki Inoue	May 14, 2006
Realizing that there were three Worms mimicking the same man all along, Drake and Kabuto work together to defeat them. Kagami thinks that he destroyed a Worm by himself, but in truth Tendou has helped him through the use of Clock Up. Mishima temporarily takes over as TheBee because Kageyama failed to do his job.
17	"Restored Memories!!"; Transliteration: "Yomigaeru Kioku!!" (Japanese: 甦る記憶!!)	Ryuta Tasaki	Toshiki Inoue	May 21, 2006
Gon is hurt as Daisuke constantly ignores her and mistreats her, and so she runs off to Hiyori. However, after being attacked by a Worm, she hits her head and recalls some of her memories. In the end, Gon gets captured by ZECT.
18	"Farewell, Gon"; Transliteration: "Saraba Gon" (Japanese: さらばゴン)	Ryuta Tasaki	Toshiki Inoue	May 28, 2006
Due to an attack by a Worm from Gon's past, Gon's memories are restored, at the cost of losing her memories of being Gon; and with Daisuke. She returns to her mother and Daisuke leaves for an unknown place, realizing that it was for the best.
19	"Scorpion Millionaire"; Transliteration: "Sasori Fugō" (Japanese: さそり富豪)	Takao Nagaishi	Toshiki Inoue	June 4, 2006
A new man by the name of Tsurugi Kamishiro appears, and he is seemingly as arrogant as Tendou. After competing with Tendou in all manners of sports, he meets Tendou at the top of the roof, ready to fight a Worm. It is then shown that he is Kamen Rider Sasword.
20	"Eh, Jiiya?"; Transliteration: "Nee, Jiiya?" (Japanese: ねぇじいや?)	Takao Nagaishi	Toshiki Inoue	June 11, 2006
Tsurugi becomes the next target of the Phantom Thief Shadow, whose actual goal is to lure the Worm that only targets criminals out. Tsurugi causes a traffic accident which injures Juka, and so Tendou punches him. After realizing Tendou also has a sister, he apologizes. After destroying Sepultura Worm with Rider Slash, Sasword transforms into Scorpio Worm, the very Worm that killed his sister.
21	"Vs. Stag Beetle"; Transliteration: "Tai Kuwagata" (Japanese: VSクワガタ)	Ryuta Tasaki	Shōji Yonemura	June 25, 2006
ZECT has made a new Zecter known as the Gatack Zecter. Due to its immense power, no one is able to use it and Tadokoro is badly hurt trying to tame the Zecter. Elsewhere, Kagami has made friends with a young boy who seems to be hiding something.
22	"Birth of a Special Compilation"; Transliteration: "Tanjō Tokubetsuhen" (Japanese: 誕生特別編)	Ryuta Tasaki	Shōji Yonemura	July 2, 2006
Kagami tries his hand at taming the Gatack Zecter but is badly hurt in the process. After discovering the secret of the young boy Kagami met, he is seemingly killed, until the Gatack Zecter is placed in his hands. Using its power, Kagami is able to become Kamen Rider Gatack. Kagami wins his first battle and also discovers that all Worms are not necessarily evil.
23	"Riddle + Riddle = X"; Transliteration: "Nazo Tasu Nazo Wa Ekkusu" (Japanese: 謎+謎=X)	Naoki Tamura	Shōji Yonemura	July 9, 2006
Worms begin attacking anyone and everyone that possesses pieces of the meteorite. Kagami questions Tendou as to how he originally came into ownership of his belt and the truth about the financial state of the Discabil family is exposed.
24	"The Ramen Way"; Transliteration: "Rāmen-dō" (Japanese: ラーメン道)	Naoki Tamura	Shōji Yonemura	July 16, 2006
Tendou and Tsurugi finish their battle from the previous episode to end with Tendou as the victor. Hiyori, along with Kagami and Tendou, enter Area X to discover what ZECT is trying to keep hidden from the world. Once inside, the trio meets resistance from Kageyama and Shadow and Hiyori discovers that Tendou and Kagami are Kamen Riders Kabuto and Gatack. After receiving some help from an unlikely ally, the trio opens the door to the center of Area X.
25	"The Proud Searchlight"; Transliteration: "Ogoru Sōsasen" (Japanese: 驕る捜査線)	Takao Nagaishi	Shōji Yonemura	July 23, 2006
The stay inside the core of Area X is cut short as TheBee and Shadow force the trio to make an early exit. Tendou joins the police force in an attempt to get closer to ZECT and Kagami impersonates Tadoroko to get closer to ZECT HQ. Meanwhile, as Kageyama pursued a new and mysterious Worm, Rena Mamiya/Uca Worm, one of her subordinates assumed Misaki's form to kidnap Tendou's younger sister, Juka.
26	"Love That Shook the Earth"; Transliteration: "Gekishin Suru Ai" (Japanese: 激震する愛)	Takao Nagaishi	Shōji Yonemura	July 30, 2006
Tendou and Kagami try to find out why Kagami's name was written in the file from 35 years ago. Tendou is questioned about the identity of his parents and Hiyori begins to suspect Tendou of being more than he claims to be.
27	"Me!? A Murderer"; Transliteration: "Ore!? Satsujinhan" (Japanese: 俺!?殺人犯)	Ryuta Tasaki	Toshiki Inoue	August 6, 2006
After holding off a very powerful Worm that Tendou is unable to beat, he makes a promise to Hiyori that he will always protect her. Elsewhere, Gon regains her memory after reading an article about Daisuke, who has been accused of a murder. Jiya then falls ill and a grieving Tsurugi goes to Tendou for help.
28	"Why!? Death"; Transliteration: "Naze!? Zetsumei" (Japanese: なぜ!?絶命)	Ryuta Tasaki	Toshiki Inoue	August 13, 2006
Everyone thinks Daisuke has died and that a Worm is impersonating him, but in reality it was a deception to force the Riders on one another. The real Daisuke was soon attacked by the other four riders as he tries to prove that he is human. Eventually the Worm's identity is discovered, and Daisuke retrieves his Drake Grip. Hyper Kabuto makes its first appearance after defeating several Pupa Worms.
29	"The Dark Kitchen"; Transliteration: "Yami Kitchin" (Japanese: 闇キッチン)	Hidenori Ishida	Toshiki Inoue	August 20, 2006
A new Worm under the guise of master chef Ichiro Ikesu is using the dark cookings arts to have people submit to his "superior" skill as part of his plan to rule the world with his cooking added with the power of the Black Knife. Jiya then tries compete against Ichiro Ikesu without knowing that he is a Worm, Jiiya falls ill after losing to him in an iron chef match. Tendou vowed to avenge Jiya.
30	"Miso Soup Ascension"; Transliteration: "Misoshiru Shōten" (Japanese: 味噌汁昇天)	Hidenori Ishida	Toshiki Inoue	August 27, 2006
Tendou pays a visit to Jiya's brother and receives the ancient White Knife blade that will allow him to win in the upcoming match with Ichiro. Kagami then discovers the shocking truth behind Tsurugi's past and must come to his defense against a Tendou who says that he will defeat all Worms.
31	"Shocking Fact"; Transliteration: "Shōgeki no Jijitsu" (Japanese: 衝撃の事実)	Takao Nagaishi	Shōji Yonemura	September 3, 2006
Kagami tries to learn more about how Tsurugi became a Worm, eventually he ends up at Jiya who has a secret that he has been keeping from Tsurugi. For helping him in a battle, Tsurugi proclaims that he and Kagami shall now be best friends. Hiyori, after being attacked by a group of Worms, evolves into Sisyra Worm, her true form.
32	"Puzzle Unraveled!!"; Transliteration: "Tokeru Nazo!!" (Japanese: 解ける謎!!)	Takao Nagaishi	Shōji Yonemura	September 10, 2006
Hiyori finally discovers that she and Tendou and are brother and sister. Hiyori has become the target of ZECT with Mishima commanding Kageyama to eliminate her. Mishima is also seen with the mysterious Hyper Zecter. Tendou, Kagami and Hiyori finally enter the center of Area X, but Kagami and Tendou are thrown out onto a beach while Hiyori discovers the identity of the man in the iron mask.
33	"The Sprouting Adjutant"; Transliteration: "Moeru Fukukan" (Japanese: 萌える副官)	Ryuta Tasaki	Shōji Yonemura	September 17, 2006
Hiyori disappears and Tendou lends his strength to ZECT to find out where she has gone. A training session is held for the new ZECT Troopers and a girl named Renge Takatori is sent by Mishima to get closer to Tendou. Tendou also starts collecting the Zecters to ensure that he will be the only rider left, but after attempting to obtain the TheBee Zecter, he meets an old Rider, with a new look, who has become Kamen Rider Kick Hopper.
34	"Breaking Super Evolution"; Transliteration: "Kudake Chō Shinka" (Japanese: 砕け超進化)	Ryuta Tasaki	Shōji Yonemura	September 24, 2006
Kageyama begs Tendou to return him his Zecter but Tendou says he will be the only rider in the end. Afterwards, Mishima orders Renge Takatori to kill Tendou; but when Tendou convinces her to eat his cooking, she steals the Hyper Zecter from Mishima only to be pursued by both enemy factions. The Hyper Zecter is then seemingly destroyed, and Kagami was destroyed by the worm. It turns out, the Hyper Zecter merely warped itself through time to come to Tendou allowing him to transform into Kamen Rider Kabuto Hyper Form. He uses it to return to save him just before Kagami was destroyed.
35	"The Hellish Brothers"; Transliteration: "Jigōku no Kyōdai" (Japanese: 地獄の兄弟)	Hidenori Ishida	Shōji Yonemura	October 1, 2006
A mysterious man called Daigo Tachikawa tells Tendou to stop collecting the Zecters. He says the riders are there to combat Worms that aren't native to earth. Daigo becomes Kamen Rider Drake later on to save a mother and her child in front of Kagami. After being told to chase Daigo, Kageyama is nearly killed when Yaguruma saves him and "sends him to hell" allowing him to become Kamen Rider Punch Hopper.
36	"Red Shoes' Recklessness"; Transliteration: "Akai Kutsu Bōsō" (Japanese: 赤い靴暴走)	Hidenori Ishida	Shōji Yonemura	October 8, 2006
Riku Kagami tells Tendou of the story of The Red Shoes and explains that both Kabuto and Gattack has a system that forces the wearer to destroy all Worms, regardless of the wearers' will. After Kabuto goes insane and almost kills Tachigawa, Gatack stops him but is unable to prevent Daigo's death by Cochlea Worm. In the end, Tendou and Kagami make a pact to stop each other if they ever try to destroy Hiyori.
37	"School's Ghost Story"; Transliteration: "Gakkō no Kaidan" (Japanese: 学校の怪談)	Takao Nagaishi	Shōji Yonemura	October 15, 2006
Tendou learns of strange occurrences happening at Juka's school and sends Kagami and Misaki to investigate the problem. Kageyama encounters a young girl who he protects and is reminded by Yaguruma that he can no longer interact with other humans.
38	"The Dangerous Younger Sister"; Transliteration: "Abunai Imōto" (Japanese: あぶない妹)	Takao Nagaishi	Shōji Yonemura	October 22, 2006
The truth behind the school's ghost story is discovered, for the principal has been making secret deals with the Worms, who in turn replace students, one by one. Kagami seeks out this Worm after going on Juka's trip, and Tsurugi returns, once again as Sasword.
39	"The Powerful Black Opponent"; Transliteration: "Kyōteki Kuro Kabu" (Japanese: 強敵黒カブ)	Ryuta Tasaki	Toshiki Inoue	October 29, 2006
Uca Worm seeks out Tendou once more, in an attempt to retrieve the Hyper Zecter, but her plan is foiled when she loses her memory due to Tendou's Hyper Sting attack. Befriended by Kazama Daisuke, she seemingly returns to her normal life of singing and happiness. Kabuto is taken to an alternate dimension and meets Dark Kabuto.
40	"The Saddest Battle"; Transliteration: "Saidai no Aisen" (Japanese: 最大の哀戦)	Ryuta Tasaki	Toshiki Inoue	November 12, 2006
Rena recovers her memories after encountering Punch and Kick Hopper, but was saved by Kamen Rider Drake. After becoming Uca Worm again, she proceeds to fight Drake, but is forced into a weak position. After sacrificing his love for her to come to the realization that she was evil, Drake makes a heart-paining choice and destroys Uca Worm.
41	"The Strongest Defeated"; Transliteration: "Yabureru Saikyō" (Japanese: 敗れる最強)	Hidenori Ishida	Shōji Yonemura	November 19, 2006
A new weapon is created by ZECT called the AM bomb. Short for anti-mimicry, this device is used on the general population, revealing all the Native's and other Worms disguised as humans. Kagami also goes to his father and learns the origins of ZECT and the Masked Rider system, wondering if his sole purpose is to fight Worms.
42	"Worst Terror vs. Worst Fear"; Transliteration: "Saikyō Tai Saikyō" (Japanese: 最凶VS.最恐)	Hidenori Ishida	Shōji Yonemura	November 26, 2006
Reiji Nogi has captured mass amounts of Native Worms along with Tadakoro. He demands that one more AM bomb be given to him. If so, he will release the Natives, however, they will no longer have their mimic abilities. Kagami is sent into negotiations, but things happen that are even out of his control. Meanwhile, an old dark enemy returns again to take on Kabuto.
43	"That Which We Aim For"; Transliteration: "Ore o Nerau Ore" (Japanese: 俺を狙う俺)	Takayuki Shibasaki	Shōji Yonemura	December 3, 2006
The Worm Souji has appeared in the city and after visiting the Bistro and trying Renge's food, Kagami notices something odd about him. They realize he is a Worm, but Hyper Kabuto is able to subdue Dark Kabuto. However, Hiyori appears and sides with Dark Kabuto. Nogi and his Worm forces also prepare to enter Area Z, the location of the Masked Rider System's creation.
44	"Who You Will Live With"; Transliteration: "Ikiru to wa" (Japanese: 生きるとは)	Takayuki Shibasaki	Shōji Yonemura	December 10, 2006
After hearing that Hiyori does not want to return to the real world anymore, Tendou is left in shock. Kageyama begins to stray from the path of darkness as he is enticed by the sight of TheBee. Elsewhere, Nogi and his army advance towards Area Z. Kagami holds off Nogi's forces while Tendou tries to convince Hiyori to return to the real world.
45	"Christmas Earthquake"; Transliteration: "Kurisumasu Gekishin" (Japanese: Xマス激震)	Takao Nagaishi	Toshiki Inoue	December 17, 2006
The Worm Souji returns to the real world to destroy everyone and everything, including Hiyori. Tsurugi and Misaki prepare for their first date, but while on their date, Tsurugi becomes Scorpio Worm. Tendou and Kagami prepare themselves for the approaching battle with Dark Kabuto.
46	"Farewell, Tsurugi!!"; Transliteration: "Saraba Tsurugi!!" (Japanese: さらば剣!!)	Takao Nagaishi	Toshiki Inoue	December 24, 2006
Kamishiro Tsurugi finally becomes aware that he is Scorpio Worm. Driven to a point of insanity, he takes Kagami captive and demands that all the Zecters be given to him. Tendou then goes to make the trade, but ultimately defeats Scorpio Worm.
47	"Rushing into the Last Chapter"; Transliteration: "Saishūshō Totsunyū" (Japanese: 最終章突入)	Hidenori Ishida	Shōji Yonemura	January 7, 2007
Riku Kagami has finally announced to the world the threat of the Worms, and in turn ZECT has created necklaces that react when a Worm is nearby. However, Tendou seems to be destroying these necklaces, but will not tell anyone the reason. In an attempt to block Tadokoro's bullets, Tendou accidentally injures Renge.
48	"Tendou Dies!!"; Transliteration: "Tendō Shisu!!" (Japanese: 天道死す!!)	Hidenori Ishida	Shōji Yonemura	January 14, 2007
After confronting Tendou about the truth of the Worm necklaces, Kagami doesn't believe that they actually turn humans into Natives. Tendou and Kagami once again fight, with Kagami being the victor. Meanwhile, Mishima is plotting with Negishi to overthrow Riku as the leader of ZECT. Yaguruma is forced to kill Kageyama after he turns into a Native, due to the necklaces.
49 (Finale)	"Path of Heaven"; Transliteration: "Ten no Michi" (Japanese: 天の道)	Hidenori Ishida	Shōji Yonemura	January 21, 2007
Kagami rushes to stop Mishima's plans of using a meteorite to drain Dark Kabuto of his powers. As he reaches the area of the final battle, he finds Mishima and Negishi conducting a broadcast all around the planet. Unbeknown to the humans, the signals sent out by the broadcast are composed of Dark Kabuto's drained power and causing the humans to become Natives. As Kagami lays defeated, Tendou appears, after going one-on-one with Mishima, Kagami regains his strength and joins Tendou in a double team on Mishima for the final battle.

== See also ==
- List of Kamen Rider Kabuto characters
