= Kamen Rider Kabuto: God Speed Love =

Kamen Rider Kabuto the Movie: God Speed Love

Japanese name
- Kanji: 劇場版 仮面ライダーカブト GOD SPEED LOVE
Transcriptions
- Revised Hepburn: Gekijōban Kamen Raidā Kabuto Goddo Supīdo Rabu
- Directed by: Hidenori Ishida
- Written by: Shōji Yonemura
- Based on: Kamen Rider Kabuto by Shoji Yonemura
- Produced by: Ishimori Productions; Toei
- Starring: Hiro Mizushima; Yuki Sato; Yui Satonaka; Hidenori Tokuyama; Kazuki Kato; Katsuya Kobayashi; Mitsuki Koga; Musashi; Chisato Morishita
- Cinematography: Masao Inokuma
- Edited by: Naoki Osada
- Music by: Kuniaki Haishima
- Production company: Toei
- Distributed by: Toei Co. Ltd
- Release date: August 5, 2006
- Running time: 66 minutes; 79 minutes (Director's Cut)
- Country: Japan
- Language: Japanese
- Budget: $6,000,000

Kamen Rider Kabuto the Movie: God Speed Love (劇場版 仮面ライダーカブト GOD SPEED LOVE, Gekijōban Kamen Raidā Kabuto Goddo Supīdo Rabu) is the theatrical film adaptation of the Kamen Rider Kabuto TV series directed by Hidenori Ishida and written by Shōji Yonemura. Unlike previous Kamen Rider movies, its serves a prologue of sorts to the TV series rather than following its storyline. The movie shows a previous timeline where the close relations between Riders (Kuuga to Hibiki) did not exist and the impact of the first meteor evaporated all of Earth's oceans. Seven years after the meteor hit Earth, ZECT pretends to use a passing comet to refill the Earth's oceans, while in fact they are pulling another meteor to crash on Earth, one large enough to wipeout all of humanity.

The film was produced by Ishimori Productions and Toei, the producers of all the previous television series and films in the Kamen Rider franchise. Following the tradition of all Heisei Kamen Rider movies, it is a double bill with 2006's Super Sentai movie, GoGo Sentai Boukenger The Movie: "The Greatest Precious". Upon its release, the movie was the second highest selling family movie of the week coming in at 4th place. A Director's Cut version of the movie was released in May 2007.

== Plot ==
In 1999, an enormous meteor crashed onto Earth and caused a global calamity that depleted the planet's waters. Furthermore, the meteor carried extraterrestrial creatures known as the Worms who proceeded to kill humans and assume their identities. In order to counter this new threat, ZECT was formed, who in turn created the Masked Rider System to combat the Worms. The battles lasts over seven years, depleting Earth's resources and turning it into a barren wasteland. By present time, power struggles in ZECT have caused Hidenori Oda to establish a splinter group called Neo-ZECT with Daisuke Kazama and Shura Hokuto to fight against ZECT's authority. A mysterious youth named Souji Tendou arrives to the city and decides to sell his power to either Neo-ZECT or ZECT for his own personal agenda.

At the same time, ZECT has obtained intelligence about a large comet orbiting the vicinity of space. By building the Jacob's Ladder space station, they plan to capture this comet and spread its water throughout Earth, replenishing the Earth’s oceans. The space station includes a function that works in conjunction with the Rider System's Clock Up function. Tendou joins Neo-ZECT after telling Kagami that he will act as a double agent and report back what Neo-ZECT is currently planning while destroying the organization from the inside. Tendou, in turns, updates Neo-ZECT about ZECT's operation, effectively manipulating both groups while getting intel on ZECT's golden rider.

When Neo-ZECT's plan to take over the Jacob's Ladder is initiated, both groups’ true colors come to light. Tendou and Oda proceed to Jacob's Ladder while Shura and Daisuke act as a diversion. Daisuke transforms into Kamen Rider Drake and exploded a few gas tanks in order to gain attention. But The plan failed when Shura betrayed them, and Daisuke realizes it's a trap and ZECT already knows about their attack. Tendou and Oda are greeted by Yaguruma Sou and ZECTroopers, while Daisuke dies facing Shura and her troops. Meanwhile, Tendou and Oda are attempting to fight off Yaguruma. Oda tells Tendou to hurry ahead to the space station, and he will hold Yaguruma and his troops back. Yaguruma transformed into Kamen Rider TheBee before being killed by Oda as Kamen Rider Hercus. Tendou arrived on Jacob's Ladder first and is confronted by Tetsuki Yamato - Kamen Rider Ketaros. Kabuto's fight with Ketaros ends when they both fall off the space station due a shockwave caused by the comet being shattered by meteor that was dragged in by the Clock Up function. Kabuto survives by using the Kabuto Extender for a safe landing while Ketaros dies upon re-entry into Earth's atmosphere and Oda is killed by the mysterious golden rider Kamen Rider Caucasus.

Tendou and Kagami later receive news that Hiyori is on the point of dying due to the exposure to the meteor dust years ago and it is then that Tendou reveals he is Hiyori's brother. Holding the wedding ceremony in a hospital, Hiyori dies soon afterwards. At this point, despite being told that precautions to destroy the meteor will be executed, Shura learns that ZECT's higher ups have sided with the Worms and intend to have the meteor fall. Mortally wounded from an attempt to silence her, Shura lived long enough to call Tendou of the turn of events as he and Kagami take it on as their mission to save humanity from this disaster. Kabuto and Gattack reach the shuttle in time and meet Caucasus, who explains to them that the meteor is carried hibernating Worms. Furthermore, explaining he defends only those who deserve to be the superior form of life, and that missiles within the shuttle will be used to decimate the human population to enable the Worms' infiltration.

The majority of the battle is in Caucasus' favor due to the speed provided to him by the Hyper Zector: The item that Tendou was searching for the entire time. Caucasus was about to kill Kabuto with a Rider Kick when Gattack intercepts the attack, badly wounding himself while allowing Kabuto to take the Hyper Zector from Caucasus and force him out through the air-lock. Kabuto places the injured Kagami into an escape pod to send him to Earth, unaware that Caucasus is holding on Kagami's escape pod and intends to punch a hole into the window to kill the man for his interference. Kabuto luckily uses the Hyper Zector to become Hyper Kabuto and uses Hyper Clock Up to intercept Caucacus before he succeeded and Hyper Kicked him into the space shuttle, destroying him and the vessel.

Hyper Kabuto then uses the Hyper Zecter to send the second meteor back in time by seven years and force it to crash into the first meteor. The result is that only a small fragment of the original meteor hits Shibuya, minimizing the damage and erasing the future in which the Earth's oceans are dried up. But shockwave caused by the two meteors crashing knocks Tendou towards Shibuya, finding his past self in the same situation as in the previous timeline. But Tendou, in his final moments of existence, gives his belt to the younger Tendou to give the boy strength to save Hiyori. With the disastrous future erased, Tendou disappears as his younger self grows up and lives a better life in the new timeline.

== Characters ==
=== Movie-exclusive characters ===
- Issei Kurosaki/Kamen Rider Caucasus (黒崎 一誠／仮面ライダーコーカサス, Kurosaki Issei/Kamen Raidā Kōkasasu): Age unknown, he is the user of the Caucasus Zecter and is ZECT's strongest soldier. Usually seen with a single blue rose. He is able to defeat Kabuto and Gatack with his Hyper Clock Up but is stopped by Gatack from killing Kabuto with his Rider Kick. He is later killed by Hyper Kabuto by being sent into the missile heading for the second meteor.
- Hidenari Oda/Kamen Rider Hercus (織田 秀成／仮面ライダーヘラクス, Oda Hidenari/Kamen Raidā Herakusu): User of the Hercus Zecter. He seeks freedom from the oppression of ZECT. He creates Neo-ZECT and openly invites Tendou to aid him, but realizes it is a double edge. He defeats TheBee during a fight on the ZECT Base and proceeds to fight Caucasus. However, Caucasus is able to kill him within seconds using Hyper Clock Up.
- Tetsuki Yamato/Kamen Rider Ketaros (大和 鉄騎／仮面ライダーケタロス, Yamato Tetsuki/Kamen Raidā Ketarosu): Prominent member of ZECT, he uses the Ketaros Zecter and follows Mishima's orders in order to create the Jacob's Ladder station. He is loyal to ZECT and is given the mission to eliminate Neo-ZECT. He knows that members who have betrayed ZECT must be destroyed under any circumstances. After meeting Kabuto in the space station, they begin to fight in outer space using Clock up, but end up falling off of the space station with Yamato dying upon re-entry.
- Shura Hokuto (北斗 修羅, Hokuto Shura): She is Neo-ZECT's sole female member and controls a unit of Neo-Troopers. She fights alongside the Riders and defeats Worms with energy and passion. She supports Oda and obtains information from ZECT through trickery and betrayal. However, she is a spy from ZECT. She betrays Oda and Daisuke and shoots Drake to death. After escaping from Oda, she discovers the truth behind ZECT's plan to use the second comet to increase the number of Worms on Earth, causing Mishima and Riku Kagami to order her assassination. She manages to inform Tendou of the truth just before she bleeds to death.

Notes: the Riders appearing exclusively within the movie do not have a Masked Form and all transform using the Kabutech Zecters (カブティックゼクター, Kabutikku Zekutā). Each Rider shares a similar finisher known as Rider Beat, which involves rotating the Zecter backwards. In addition, the Riders appear to have been customized versions of Kabuto's Rider Form.

== Kabutech Kamen Riders ==
=== Kamen Rider Caucasus ===
Transforms utilizing the gold-colored Caucasus Zecter (コーカサスゼクター, Kōkasasu Zekutā) in conjunction with the Rider Brace. His power easily exceeds the power of all the other Riders.

Weapons/Gear

- Caucasus Zecter
  Used by Issei Kurosaki, this Zecter allows the wearer to transform into Kamen Rider Caucasus. His finisher, the Rider Beat (ライダービート, Raidā Bīto), is used to initiate a tachyon-charged Rider Punch or Rider Kick.
- Rider Brace
  Installed onto the right arm, this is the transformation tool used for the Kabutech Zecters. The Caucasus Zecter flies onto the Brace and automatically shifts into a vertical position, starting the transformation.
- Hyper Zecter
  Installed onto the left waist buckle of the Rider Belt, this Zecter features the Hyper Clock Up function and the Maximum Rider Power function. Hyper Clock Up allows the Rider to freely control time, and Maximum Rider Power brings the power of the Masked Rider System to the highest possible level. It is used to initiate the Rider Punch or Rider Kick attack. On a side note, while Kabuto activates Hyper Clock Up by slapping the button on the Hyper Zecter, Caucasus uses it by slapping the right waist-pad instead. It appears that Caucasus cannot access the Hyper Zecter's full potential, however, as evidenced by his lack of a proper Hyper Form and the weaker power of his Hyper Clock Up (while Kabuto can time travel with Hyper Clock Up, Caucasus merely uses it as a stronger version of the normal Clock Up).

=== Kamen Rider Hercus ===
Transforms utilizing the silver-colored Hercus Zecter (ヘラクスゼクター, Herakusu Zekutā) in conjunction with the Rider Brace. He wields the ZECT Kunai Gun (ゼクトクナイガン, Zekuto Kunai Gan), and is skilled in long range combat.

Weapons/Gear

- Hercus Zecter
  Used by Hidenari Oda, this Zecter allows the wearer to transform into Kamen Rider Hercus. His finisher, the Rider Beat, infuses stored tachyon particles into the ZECT Kunai Gun, allowing him to perform a stronger version of the Avalanche Break.
- Rider Brace
  Installed onto the right arm, this is the transformation tool used for the Kabutech Zecters. The Hercus Zecter flies onto the Rider Brace landing sideways, and the user must turn it vertical to initiate the transformation.
- ZECT Kunai Gun (Gun and Axe Modes only)
  Before defecting to Neo-ZECT, this weapon was developed by ZECT for Kamen Rider Hercus. Unlike the Kabuto Kunai Gun, this Kunai Gun only features a Gun and Axe Mode, though it can be infused with the power of Rider Beat.

=== Kamen Rider Ketaros ===
Transforms utilizing the bronze-colored Ketaros Zecter (ケタロスゼクター, Ketarosu Zekutā) in conjunction with the Rider Brace. He wields the ZECT Kunai Gun, and is skilled in close range combat.

Weapons/Gear

- Ketaros Zecter
  Used by Tetsuki Yamato, this Zecter allows the wearer to transform into Ketaros. His finisher, the Rider Beat, infuses stored tachyon particles become into the ZECT Kunai Gun in order to perform a stronger version of the Avalanche Slash.
- Rider Brace
  Installed onto the right arm, this is the transformation tool used for the Kabutech Zecters. The Ketaros Zecter flies onto the Rider Brace landing sideways, and the user must turn it vertical to initiate the transformation.
- ZECT Kunai Gun (Kunai Mode only)
  Developed by ZECT for Kamen Rider Ketaros, this Kunai Gun bears similarities to the Kabuto Kunai Gun. However, it only has a Kunai Mode, though its power can be infused with the Rider Beat.

== ZECT / Neo-ZECT ==
- ZECTrooper
  General foot soldiers used by ZECT, these troopers use the Machine Blade Gun and wear padded, insect-like armor. They act as law enforcers after the crash of the Shibuya Meteorite.
- Neo-Trooper
  Foot soldiers created by Neo-ZECT, these soldiers act as the cannon fodder for Neo-ZECT's assaults. The armor is silver with blue lines. The Neo-Troopers are armed with shield units and Machine Blade Guns which have seals on them.

== Worms ==
Worms only shown within the movie visually resemble the Native Worms seen on the TV series. They arrived on the meteorite that struck the Earth in 1999, and have one objective, which is to conquer humanity. Although massive amounts of Worms are seen at the beginning of the movie, only one evolved Worm, Culex Worm, appears for a fight scene, which is destroyed by Kabuto's Rider Kick, while more evolved Worms are killed in larger numbers by Kabuto and Gatack in Clock Up at the end of the movie.

== Cast ==
- Souji Tendou (天道 総司, Tendō Sōji): Hiro Mizushima (水嶋 ヒロ, Mizushima Hiro)
- Arata Kagami (加賀美 新, Kagami Arata): Yuki Sato (佐藤 祐基, Satō Yūki)
- Hiyori Kusakabe (日下部 ひより, Kusakabe Hiyori): Yui Satonaka (里中 唯, Satonaka Yui)
- Sou Yaguruma (矢車 想, Yaguruma Sō): Hidenori Tokuyama (徳山 秀典, Tokuyama Hidenori)
- Daisuke Kazama (風間 大介, Kazama Daisuke): Kazuki Kato (加藤 和樹, Katō Kazuki)
- Yuzuki Misaki (岬 祐月, Misaki Yuzuki): Anna Nagata (永田 杏奈, Nagata Anna)
- Masato Mishima (三島 正人, Mishima Masato): Tomohisa Yuge (弓削 智久, Yuge Tomohisa)
- Jyuka Tendou (天道 樹花, Tendō Juka): Natsumi Okumura (奥村 夏未, Okumura Natsumi)
- Satomi Kusakabe (日下部 さとみ, Kusakabe Satomi): Kaori Asano (浅野 香織, Asano Kaori)
- Tendou of 7 Years Ago (7年前の天道, Shichinenmae no Tendō): Sean Wiig (ショーン・ウィーグ, Shōn Wīgu)
- Hiyori of 7 Years Ago (7年前のひより, Shichinenmae no Hiyori): Reina Fujii (藤井 玲奈, Fujii Reina)
- Yumiko Takemiya (竹宮 弓子, Takemiya Yumiko): Megumi Nishimuta (西牟田 恵, Nishimuta Megumi)
- Shuichi Tadokoro (田所 修一, Tadokoro Shuichi): Yoshiyuki Yamaguchi (山口 祥行, Yamaguchi Yoshiyuki)
- Riku Kagami (加賀美 陸, Kagami Riku): Hirotarō Honda (本田 博太郎, Honda Hirotarō)
- Hidenari Oda (織田 秀成, Oda Hidenari): Katsuya Kobayashi (小林 且弥, Kobayashi Katsuya)
- Shura Hokuto (北斗シュラ, Hokuto Shura): Chisato Morishita (森下千里, Morishita Chisato)
- Tetsuki Yamato (大和 鉄騎, Yamato Tetsuki): Mitsuki Koga (虎牙 光揮, Koga Mitsuki)
- Issei Kurosaki (黒崎 一誠, Kurosaki Issei): Musashi (武蔵)
- Doctor (医者, Isha): Kenta Satoi (佐戸井 けん太, Satoi Keta)
- Customers (客, Kyaku): Jichō Kachō (次長課長)
- Kamen Rider Sasword (仮面ライダーサソード, Kamen Raidā Sasōdo; Voice): Yusuke Yamamoto (山本 裕典, Yamamoto Yūsuke)
- Narration: Eiichiro Suzuki (鈴木 英一郎, Suzuki Eiichirō)

== Songs ==
Theme song

- "ONE WORLD"
  - Lyrics & Composition: Koji Kikkawa
  - Arrangement: Hiroaki Sugawara
  - Strings Arrangement: Neko Saito
  - Artist: Koji Kikkawa
