= Masato Uchiyama =

Japanese actor

- 内山眞人
- Born: May 2, 1986 (age 40); Tokyo, Japan
- Occupation: Actor
- Years active: 1991–present

Masato Uchiyama (内山 眞人, Uchiyama Masato; born May 2, 1986 in Tokyo, Japan) is a Japanese actor. A fan of tokusatsu, Uchiyama has had a role in several series, most notably Shun Kageyama/Kamen Rider TheBee/Kamen Rider Punch Hopper in Kamen Rider Kabuto and Ren Senjyu in Ultraman Nexus.Ultraman Nexus.

== Filmography ==
=== TV Drama ===
- Nobunaga KING OF ZIPANGU (1992) – Oda Nobuyuki (young)
- (Drama Ai no Uta) Oguri no ko (1998)
- (Drama Ai no Uta) Maboroshi no Pen Friend (2001)
- 武蔵 MUSASHI (2003)
- Kamen Rider 555 (2003) – Kobayashi Yoshio/Rabbit Orphnoch (ep. 24-25)
- Ultra Q: Dark Fantasy (2004) (episode 11)
- Ultraman Nexus (2005) – Ren Senjyu
- Hagure keijijunjouha (2005)
- Shin Kaze no Rondo (2006)
- Kamen Rider Kabuto (2006-2007) – Shun Kageyama/Kamen Rider TheBee 2/Kamen Rider PunchHopper
- Kamen Rider Decade (2009) – Shun Kageyama/Kamen Rider PunchHopper (Voice in Ep.2 and Ep.3)
- Kamen Rider Zi-O (2019) – Shun Kageyama (Worm)/Kamen Rider PunchHopper (episodes 37 and 38)

=== Movies ===
- Kamen Rider Den-O: I'm Born! (2007) – Salamander Imagin (voice)
- Bokura no Ai no Kanade (2007)
