= Yusuke Yamamoto =

Japanese actor and DJ (born 1988)

- 山本 裕典
- Born: January 19, 1988 (age 37); Aichi, Japan
- Occupation(s): Actor, DJ
- Years active: 2006–2017; 2019–present
- Notable credit: Ouran High School Host Club (live-action) as Tamaki Suoh

Yusuke Yamamoto (山本裕典, Yamamoto Yūsuke; born January 19, 1988) is a Japanese actor and DJ. He was born in Aichi, Japan. His debut role was as Tsurugi Kamishiro, a.k.a. Kamen Rider Sasword, in Kamen Rider Kabuto.

== Filmography ==
=== Television ===
Year	Title	Role	Other notes
2006	Kamen Rider Kabuto	Tsurugi Kamishiro/Kamen Rider Sasword	
2007	Himitsu no Hanazono	Takumi Tachikawa	
2007	Puzzle	Iikawa	
2007	Oniyome Nikki 2	Neighbor	
2007	My Fair Boy!	Yuichi	
2007	Hanazakari no Kimitachi e	Taiki Kayashima	
2007	Iryu 2	Guest	Episodes 2-3
2008	Puzzle	Shinichi Imamura	
2008	Taiyo to Umi no Kyoshitsu	Eiji Kawabe	
2008	Odaiba Tantei Shuchishin Hexagon Satsujin Jiken	Guest	
2008	Hanazakari no Kimitachi e SP	Taiki Kayashima	
2008	RESCUE	Masashi Fudou	
2009	Atashinchi no Danshi	Masaru Ookura	
2009	Ninkyo Helper	Reiji Izumi	
2009	Shaken Baby!	Hiroshi Odagaki	
2010	Rinne no Ame	Kohei Mikami	
2010	Sotsu Uta	Miki Yasuki	Episode 3
2010	Tumbling	Wataru Azuma	
2011	Ouran High School Host Club	Tamaki Suoh	
2011	Aji Ichimonme 2011 Special	Shintaro Adachi	
2011	Ninkyo Helper SP	Reiji Izumi	
2011	Nankyoku Tairiku	Natsuo Inuzuka	
2012	Great Teacher Onizuka	Toshiyuki Saejima	
2012	Mou Ichido Kimi ni, Propose	Yuki Tanimura	
2012	Great Teacher Onizuka SP	Toshiyuki Saejima	
2013	Great Teacher Onizuka New Year's SP	Toshiyuki Saejima	
2013	Unfair: Double Meaning ~ Yes or No?	Manabu Ozone	
2013	Apoyan	Hisao Edamoto	
2013	Aji Ichimonme 2013 Special	Shintaro Adachi	
2013	Last Cinderella	Masaomi	Episodes 6-7
2013	Yamadakun to 7nin no majo	Ryu Yamada	
2013	Great Teacher Onizuka Graduate SP	Toshiyuki Saejima	
2014	SMOKING GUN	Masaru Tasaka	Episodes 6-7
2014	Great Teacher Onizuka In Taiwan	Toshiyuki Saejima	
2014	Great Teacher Onizuka 2	Toshiyuki Saejima	
2015	Itsutsu Boshi Tourist	Satake Ichiro	

=== Films ===
Year	Title	Role	Other notes
2006	Kamen Rider Kabuto: God Speed Love	Kamen Rider Sasword	Voice role
2008	Handsome Suit	Yuki Osawa	
2009	Chasing My Girl		
2009	MW / M.W.	Mizobata	
2009	ROOKIES ~Sotsugyo~	Akahoshi Shoji	
2010	Police Dog Dream	Wataru Tashiro	
2011	Paradise Kiss	Hiroyuki Tokumori	
2012	Ouran High School Host Club	Tamaki Suoh	
2012	Sadako 3D	Seiji Kashiwada	

=== Dubbing ===
- Cirque du Freak: The Vampire's Assistant (Darren Shan (Chris Massoglia))
