= Kazuki Kato =

Japanese actor (born 1984)

- 加藤 和樹
- Born: October 7, 1984 (age 42); Nagoya, Aichi Prefecture, Japan
- Occupations: Actor; voice actor; singer
- Years active: 2003–present
- Height: 181 cm (5 ft 11 in)
- Website: www.katokazuki.com

Kazuki Kato (加藤 和樹, Katō Kazuki; October 7, 1984) is a Japanese actor and singer. He is best known for his role as Daisuke Kazama, also known as Kamen Rider Drake, in Kamen Rider Kabuto and Keigo Atobe in The Prince of Tennis musicals. In 2011, he formed a band called Joker and their first single debuted on December 7, 2011.

== Filmography ==
=== Drama ===
- Kamen Rider Kabuto (2006-2007) as Daisuke Kazama/Kamen Rider Drake
- Jigoku Shoujo (2006-2007) as Ichimoku Ren
- Hotaru no Hikari: It's Only a Little Light in My Life (2007) as Teshima Makoto
- Café Kichijouji de (2008) as Ryo Shirota
- Indigo no yoru (2010) as Yuya
- Oddboys (2024) as Keita Kamoshida

=== Film ===
- Kamen Rider Kabuto: God Speed Love (2006) as Daisuke Kazama/Kamen Rider Drake
- Kamen Rider The Next (2007) as Shiro Kazami/Kamen Rider V3
- The Monster X Strikes Back/Attack the G8 Summit (2008) as Sanpei
- Kamigakari (2008)
- Happy datsu (2008) as Keisuke Shinozuka
- Neko Rahmen Taisho (2008) as Tanaka
- Koikyokusei (2009)
- Wangan Midnight (2009) as Tatsuya Shima
- Sanada 10 Braves (2016)
- Kaitō Queen wa Circus ga Osuki (2022) as Joker
- The Rose of Versailles (2025) as Hans Axel von Fersen
- Kaitō Queen no Yūga na Kyūka (2025) as Joker

=== Theatre ===
- The Imperial Match Hyotei (2005) as Keigo Atobe
- The Imperial Match Hyoutei in Winter (2005-2006) as Keigo Atobe
- Dream Live 3rd (2006) as Keigo Atobe
- Advancement Match Rokkaku feat. Hyotei Gakuen (2006) as Keigo Atobe
- bambino+ (2006; Video Performance) as Nazo no otoko (The secret man)
- babino2 (2007; due) as Aoyama Ryuichi
- The Imperial Presence Hyoutei Gakuen feat. Higa Chuu (2008) as Keigo Atobe
- Senbonzakura (2013 Musical) as Kaito
- Dream Live 4th (2013; Video Performance) as Keigo Atobe)
- Romeo and Juliet (2014 Musical) as Tybalt
- Lady Bess (2014 Musical) as Robin Blake
- Phantom (2023) as Erik/The Phantom
- Frankenstein (2017, 2020, 2025; Musical) as Henri Dupre
- Fist of the North Star The Musical (2021) as Toki
- Rurouni Kenshin The Musical: Kyoto Arc (2022) as Hiko Seijūrō
- Come from Away (2024) as Bob
- Love Never Dies (2025) as Raoul
- Demon Slayer: Swordsmith Village Arc (2025) as Kokushibō

=== Anime ===
- Katekyo Hitman Reborn! (2006) as Kikyo
- Gifū Dōdō!! Kanetsugu to Keiji (2013) as Mitsunari Ishida
- B-Project: Kodou*Ambitious (2016) as Kento Aizome
- Ikemen Sengoku: Toki o Kakeru Koi wa Hajimaranai (2017) as Date Masamune
- Kaito x Ansa (2017) as Kaito Aen
- B-Project: Zecchou*Emotion (2019) as Kento Aizome
- B-Project: Passion*Love Call (2023) as Kento Aizome
- Disney Twisted-Wonderland the Animation (2025) as Malleus Draconia

=== Video games ===
- Ikemen Sengoku: Romances Across Time (2015) as Date Masamune
- B-Project: Muteki*Dangerous (2016) as Kento Aizome
- B-Project: Kaikan*Everyday (2019) as Kento Aizome
- Disney Twisted-Wonderland (2020) as Malleus Draconia
- Ikemen Prince: The Last Love of Beauty and the Beast (2020) as Leon Dompteur
- The Caligula Effect 2 (2021) as Doctor

=== Dubbing ===
- S.W.A.T. (2017-2025) as Sergeant II David "Deacon" Kay (Jay Harrington)

=== Internet ===
- Hitomebore short drama CM (2025) as Jin Kiteya

=== Drama CD ===
- Ikemen Sengoku: Romances Across Time (2021) as Date Masamune

=== DVD ===
- 55mm (2006) as himself
- Shinrei Shashin Kitan (2006)
- Kazuki Kato Live "GIG" 2006 (2006) as himself
- Kazuki Kato 1st Anniversary Special Live "GIG" 2007 (2007) as himself
- Kato Kazuki 3rd ANNIVERSARY SPECIAL LIVE "GIG" 2009 ~Shining Road~ (2009) as himself
- Live "GIG" Tour 2014 ~Sing A Song Fighter~in Zepp DiverCity Tokyo (2014) as himself

== Discography ==
=== Singles ===
1. "Vampire/Yume Hikōki" (Vampire/ユメヒコウキ; "Vampire/Dream Airplane") – October 18, 2006
2. "Soba ni Ite" (そばにいて; "Have You Around") – February 7, 2007
3. "Instinctive Love" – July 25, 2007
4. "Impure Love" – October 3, 2007
5. "Venom" – March 4, 2009
6. "Easy Go" – June 10, 2009
7. "Yokujō (Libido)" (欲情-libido-; "Libido") – March 17, 2010
8. "Shakunetsu Finger de Fever!" (灼熱フィンガーでFEVER!, Shakunetsu Fingā de FEVER!; "Feverish Burning Fingers!") – July 28, 2010
9. "Kiseki" – April 24, 2013
10. "Legend Is Born" – June 4, 2014
11. "snowdrop" – December 3, 2014
12. "Haru Koi/Yumeoibito" – April 20, 2016
13. "Natsu Koi/Aki Koi" – September 28, 2016
14. "Fuyu Koi" – January 18, 2017

=== Albums ===
1. Rough Diamond – April 26, 2006
2. Face – April 4, 2007
3. In Love – January 23, 2008
4. Glamorous Beat – July 15, 2009
5. TOY BOX – November 20, 2013
6. EXCITING BOX – April 29, 2015
7. SPICY BOX – October 18, 2017
8. Ultra Worker – July 18, 2018
9. Addicted BOX – June 10, 2020

=== Other ===
- Musical Prince of Tennis Best Actors Series 002: Kazuki Kato as Keigo Atobe (ミュージカル テニスの王子様 ベストアクターズシリーズ002 加藤和樹 as 跡部景吾, Myūjikaru Tenisu no Ōjisama Besuto Akutāzu Shirīzu 002 Katō Kazuki as Atobe Keigo) – December 19, 2005
- I Love Koizora from Mahō no Iland (I LOVE 恋空 from 魔法のiらんど, I LOVE Koizora from Mahō no Airando) – January 30, 2008
  - Track 6: "Kutsuato (Miageta Sora, Motto Hirokute)" (靴あと〜見上げた空、もっと広くて〜)
- Katekyō Hitman Reborn! Character Album: Song "Blue" (Rivale) (家庭教師ヒットマンREBORN! キャラクターアルバム SONG "BLUE" 〜rivale〜, Katekyō Hittoman Ribōn! Kyarakutā Arubamu SONG "BLUE" ~rivale~)
  - Track 8: "Kyōki no Hana" (狂気の花)
- Katekyō Hitman Reborn! Concert Rebocon 4: Blue

== Photobook ==
- Voyage
- Kato Kazuki Artist Book SINGER-Rough Diamond-
- Kato Kazuki 1st Anniversary Book BREAK!

== Radio ==
- MabeRadio with Kenta Kamakari and Chieko Higuchi
