= Hidenori Tokuyama =

Japanese actor and singer

- 徳山秀典
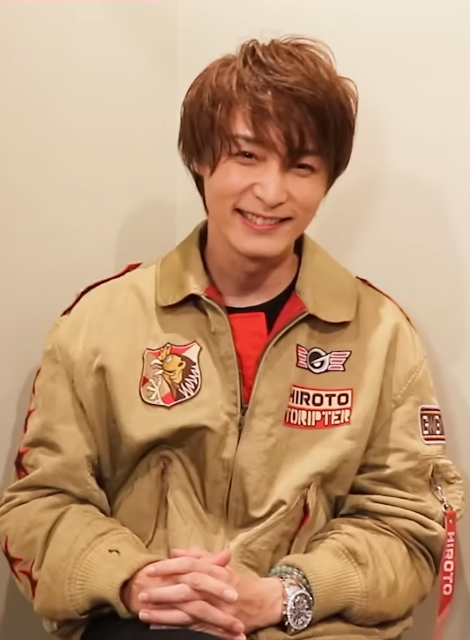
- Tokuyama in 2022
- Born: Hidenori Koyanagi; January 30, 1982 (age 44); Suginami, Tokyo, Japan
- Occupations: Singer, actor
- Years active: 1995–present
- Notable credit(s): Kamen Rider Kabutoas Sou Yaguruma/Kamen Rider TheBee/Kamen Rider KickHopper, Engine Sentai Go-onger as Hiroto Sutō/Go-on Gold
- Height: 178 cm (5 ft 10 in)
- Musical career
- Genres: Japanese Pop, Rock song
- Instruments: Vocals, guitar
- Website: tokuyama-hidenori.jp/top.html/

Hidenori Tokuyama (徳山 秀典, Tokuyama Hidenori; born January 30, 1982) is a Japanese actor and singer. A fan of tokusatsu, Tokuyama has had a role in several series, most notably Sou Yaguruma/Kamen Rider TheBee/Kamen Rider KickHopper in Kamen Rider Kabuto and Hiroto Sutō/Go-on Gold in Engine Sentai Go-onger.

== Biography ==
Born Hidenori Koyanagi (小柳 秀典, Koyanagi Hidenori) in Suginami-ku, Japan, he has one younger brother and one older sister. His parents run a ramen restaurant. Since childhood he acted in several movies and dramas. He studied in Horikoshi High School before he joined the JVC Entertainment agency and left in 2008 March. Now, he has joined M2 Music and is the vocalist of the band "eroica". In 1999, he debuted as a singer with "Afureru Omoi" which was produced by Kenichi Kurosawa. His most famous singles are the two opening songs of Gensoumaden Saiyuuki.

== Filmography ==
=== Drama and series ===
- Yashiro Shougun Yoshimune (1995, NHK), Tayasu Munetake
- Keiji ou! (1996)
- B-Fighter Kabuto (1996, TV Asahi), Eiji, episode 10
- Bokura no Yuuki Miman-toshi (1997, October – December, NTV), Ryu
- Bishoujo H (1998, Fuji TV), (10 episodes)
- Seikimatsu no uta (1998, NTV), Manaka Tooru (6 episodes)
- Great Teacher Onizuka (TV drama) (1998, July–September, Fuji TV), Kenji Yoda
  - Great Teacher Onizuka drama special (1999)
  - GTO Revival (2024)
  - GTO 2026 (2026)
- Joshi kousei mitsu-yu no nazo! (1998), (2 episodes)
- Prison Hotel (1999, April – June, Asahi TV), Hanazawa Shigeru
- Sekai no Meisaku douwa (1999), Yuuki wo dashite, xmas tree, Hanatsumi jiisan
- Hatachi no Kekkon (2000, TBS), Kashiwagi Shigeki (7 episodes)
- 19 - Nineteen Hiroshimahasu Musician Tanjyou monogatari (2000, February, RCC)
- Kyoushi binbin monogatari special: ano nekketsu saikyou comb (2000)
- Mápó dòufu no nyoubou (2003, May, NHK), Lee
- Yankee bokou ni kaeru (2003, October – December, TBS), Kume Takaaki
- Holyland (2005, April – June, TBS), Izawa Masaki
- Friday Entertaintment Chousa kenji – Tigusa Taisuke no jiken file, aka no kumikyoku (2005, November, fuji TV)
- Kamen Rider Kabuto (2006, January – 2007, January, Asahi TV), Sou Yaguruma aka Kamen Rider TheBee/Kamen Rider KickHopper
- Ultraman Max (2006, TBS), Cameo, episode 36
- Friday Entertaintment Natsuki Shizuko Suspense – Hinata Yumeko tyoutei i-in jikenpou4 fukushuu (2006, June, fuji TV)
- Saturday midnight drama (Kaikan Shokunin) (2006, August, 26th, fuji TV), (6 episodes)
- Saturday Premium (Shin-oishinbo) (2007, January, 20th, fuji TV), Okaboshi Ryouzou
- Kamen Rider Den-O No. 27 (2007, August, 5th, Asahi TV), Molech Imagin (Voice)
- Nekketsu Nise-kazoku (2007, TBS), Asakura Kazuma
- Tokyo Prom Queen (2008, YouTube, Mixi, SmileVideo), Mashima Shinji
- Engine Sentai Go-onger (2008, TV Asahi), Hiroto Sutō/Go-On Gold
- Kamen Rider Decade (2009, Asahi TV), Kamen Rider KickHopper (Voice)
- Smile (2009, TBS), Kawai Kinta
- Kosodate Play＆MORE (2009, MBS), Hikaru Nanase
- Indigo no Yoru (2010, THK), Kuuya
- Arienai (2010, THK), Shinji Yonekura, episode 7
- Keishichō shissōninsōsaka (2010, Asahi TV), Tomoya Tachibana, episode 4
- Sakura shinjū (2011, THK), Takanashi Hirohito/ Takuma Doichi
- Hanazakari no Kimitachi e (2011, fuji TV), Oscar M. Himejima / Himejima Masao
- Kaito handsome (2011, THK), Date Kimihiko
- HUNTER ~Sono Onnatachi, Shoukin Kasegi (2011, Kansai TV), Shuji Mochida, episode 6
- Sengoku Basara-MOONLIGHT PARTY (2012, MBS), Kojuro Katakura
- Koko Nyushi (2012, fuji TV), Toshiya Konishi
- Doku Poison (2012, THK), Kengo Osugi
- Otasukeya Jinpachi (2013, THK), Ikki Amamiya
- Sennyu Tantei Tokage (2013, TBS), Seiya Sone
- Yamada-kun to Nananin no Majo (2013, Fuji TV), Yamazaki Haruma
- Ao no Umi: Long Summer (2014, Tokai TV), Kota Aragaki (aged 32)
- Hatsukoi Geinin (2016, NHK BS Premium, Sugiyama Hiroki
- Kamen Rider Zi-O (2019, Asahi TV), Sou Yaguruma/Kamen Rider KickHopper/Another Kabuto

=== Stage Musical ===
- Count-down 10 (2000–2006, July Kayou pops channel)
- Musical Revolutionary Girl Utena - Blooming Rose of Deepest Black (2019)

=== Films ===
- Pyrokinesis (2000, Toho co.), Ogura Masaki
- Oshikiri (2000)
- Keizoku (2000, Toho Company)
- DRUG (2001), Kenji Odajima
- Hayazaki no Hana (2006), Maeda Sensei
- Kamen Rider Kabuto: God Speed Love (2006 Toei), Sou Yaguruma aka Kamen Rider TheBee
- AOGRA (2006, cinehouse), Kohiruimaki
- Kamen Rider Den-O: I'm Born! (2007), Molech Imagin (voice)
- Ai no Kotodama (2007, Frontie works), Ootani Shinya
- Engine Sentai Go-onger: Boom Boom! Bang Bang! GekijōBang!! (2008), Hiroto Sutō/Go-on Gold
- Kamen Rider Decade: All Riders vs. Dai-Shocker (2009 Toei), Kamen Rider KickHopper (voice)
- BADBOYS (2011)
- Thanatos (2011), Riku
- An teru-san no hana (2012)
- Party wa sento kara hajimaru (2012), Hanashima
- Engine Sentai Go-onger: 10 Years Grand Prix (2018), Hiroto Sutō/Go-On Gold

=== Anime ===
- Gensoumaden Saiyuuki (2000), Tongpu

=== Original video ===
- Gakkou Kaidan (Takahashi Yousuke) – Norowareta kioku (1998), Yamagishi Ryouichi

=== Stage ===
- TOKYO JUNK CITY (2003, July – Shinjuku tiny alice)
- Ashura no gotoku (2004, July – August, Geijutsu-za), Jinnai Hidemitsu
- Knock Out Brother −2005version- (2005, October, Ikebukuro Theater green main hall)
- Gekidan Daishuu shousetsuka (Jinsei Sairyou mitaina~!Hi?!~soushiki to kekkonshiki ga onaji hi ni?!~ (2007, April–May Tokyo geijutsu gekijyou)
- Kuraku naru made matte, Wait Until Dark (September 2007), Carlino
- 10th anniversary project Masked Rider Live & Show 2009, (Kick Hopper voice)/ Singing "Rider Prision"

=== Radio ===
- On the Way Comedy 道草 (2007, January, JFN)
- CozyShell (moon size na Yaroudomo) (2000)

=== CM ===
- Lotte black black gum (2006)
- Lipton (2006–2007, Taiwan)

== Books ==
- Tokuyama Hidenori Sueter Book (2000) ISBN 4-529-03478-X
- Tokuyama Hidenori MULTIPLE CHARACTER – photo book (2007) ISBN 4-86010-211-8
- Hitotsu no kokoro no ikutsu ka no sakebi (2010)
- Tokuyama Hidenori shashin-shū little ゛ y ゛ ear (2012)

== Discography ==
=== Singles ===
- "Afureru Omoi" (1999)
  1. Afureru Omoi
  2. Tsutaeru Kimochi
  3. Afureru Omoi (Instrumental)
- "huckleberry" (1999)
  1. huckleberry
  2. Touch Me
  3. huckleberry (Instrumental)
- "Close To Me" (2002)
  1. Close To Me
  2. Lover's Kitchen (Single Version)
  3. Close To Me (Instrumental)
- "FOR REAL" (2000)
  1. FOR REAL
  2. FOR REAL(Piano Version)
  3. FOR REAL(Guitar Version)
  4. FOR REAL(Instrumental)
- "STILL TIME" (2000)
  1. STILL TIME
  2. BLUE
  3. STILL TIME (Instrumental)
- "Sotsugyou" (2001)
  1. Sotsugyou
  2. That's a Fact
  3. Sotsugyou (Instrumental)
- "Propose / Ai no Mama Eien ni" (2011)
  1. Propose
  2. Ai no Mama Eien ni
  3. Propose(Instrumental)
  4. Ai no Mama Eien ni(Instrumental)
- "Sore wa Zenbu "Ai" Datta / I can't stop my heart" (2012)
  1. Sore wa Zenbu "Ai" Datta
  2. I can't stop my heart
  3. Sore wa Zenbu "Ai" Datta(Instrumental)
  4. I can't stop my heart(Instrumental)
- "Bokura no Michi / Ano Hi no Kimi ni" (2013)
  1. Bokura no Michi
  2. Ano Hi no Kimi ni
  3. Bokura no Michi(Instrumental)
  4. Ano Hi no Kimi ni(Instrumental)

=== Albums ===
- One 17th (2000)
  1. Spinning Wheel
  2. huckleberry (Album Version)
  3. Tsutaeru Kimochi (Album Version)
  4. Lover's Kitchen
  5. Love Letter
  6. Close To Me
  7. No, Say Good－Bye
  8. Throw Away
  9. Sleepless Night
  10. Nichijyou
  11. Afureru Omoi (Album Version)
- REAL TIME (2001)
  1. DRIVE
  2. FOR REAL
  3. BLUE (Album Version)
  4. PURE
  5. Kidukeyo
  6. STILL TIME
  7. Ha－Ha
  8. Sotsugyou
  9. Happy Birthday
  10. Itsumo sobani
- score BeAt (2007)
  1. WITH YOU!
  2. LIFE
  3. White night
  4. eve
- Aiuta (愛唄; 2009)
  1. GIFT
  2. Silent Night
  3. Daiji na Hito (大事なヒト)
  4. miss you
  5. FakeRing
- puresoul (2012)
  1. everyday
  2. Take it easy
  3. Ai no Mama Eien ni
  4. I can't stop my heart
  5. Close to dream
  6. Sore wa Zenbu "Ai" Datta
  7. Break open
  8. Love is... feat.KoN
  9. Shunkashuto
  10. Purpose

=== eroica ===
- Knows the pain (2008)
  1. Dead or die
  2. Bounce High
  3. Ever free
  4. Reverberations
  5. Knows the pain
- Stray Child
  1. Sky Gravitation
  2. String
  3. No Way
  4. Future
  5. Half of one's body

=== In popular culture ===
- Close To Me (NTV Toriaezu iikanji Ending theme)
- FOR REAL (TBS Gensoumaden Saiyuuki Opening theme)
- STILL TIME (TBS Gensoumaden Saiyuuki Second opening theme)
- Sotsugyou (Asahi TV Tonight 2 Ending theme)
- Sotsugyou (TV Kanagawa (MutomaDI:GA, 2001, February, Opening and ending theme)
- LIFE (Ai no kotodama middle song)
- eve (Ai no kotodama theme song)
