= Kamen Rider Kabuto =

Television series

- Also known as: Masked Rider Kabuto
- Genre: Tokusatsu; Superhero fiction Science fiction Action; Biopunk
- Created by: Shotaro Ishinomori
- Written by: Shōji Yonemura; Toshiki Inoue
- Directed by: Hidenori Ishida; Naoki Tamura; Takao Nagaishi; Ryuta Tasaki; Nobuhiro Suzumura; Takayuki Shibasaki
- Starring: Hiro Mizushima; Yuki Sato; Yui Satonaka; Anna Nagata; Hidenori Tokuyama; Masato Uchiyama; Kazuki Kato; Yusuke Yamamoto; Tomohisa Yuge; Yoshiyuki Yamaguchi; Hirotaro Honda
- Narrated by: Eiichiro Suzuki
- Opening theme: "NEXT LEVEL" by YU-KI
- Composer: Kuniaki Haishima
- Country of origin: Japan
- No. of episodes: 49 (list of episodes)

Production
- Producers: Atsushi Kaji (TV Asahi); Shinichiro Shirakura (Toei); Naomi Takebe (Toei)
- Running time: 20–25 minutes
- Production companies: Toei Company; Ishimori Productions; TV Asahi Corporation; Asatsu-DK

Original release
- Network: TV Asahi
- Release: January 29, 2006 – January 21, 2007

Related
- Kamen Rider Hibiki; Kamen Rider Den-O

Kamen Rider Kabuto (仮面ライダーカブト, Kamen Raidā Kabuto) is a Japanese tokusatsu superhero television series. It is the 16th installment in the popular Kamen Rider Series of tokusatsu programs. It is a joint collaboration between Asatsu-DK and Toei. The series was broadcast on TV Asahi. The first episode aired on January 29, 2006, and with the final episode airing on January 21, 2007, completing the series with 49 episodes. It aired as a part of the Super Hero Time slot alongside GoGo Sentai Boukenger. It is the series that revolves around insects, fate, and the theme of "the chosen one." The series blends action, dramatic tension, and philosophical elements with a focus on the battle between humanity and the mysterious ZECT organization, which defends the Earth from alien insect-like creatures known as the Worms. The story follows Souji Tendo, who transforms into Kamen Rider Kabuto, and his quest to protect the world while struggling with his own destiny.

The series represents the 35th anniversary of the Kamen Rider Series, as indicated by a notice at the beginning of the pilot episode reading, in Japanese, "Kamen Rider 35th Anniversary Production."

== Story ==
Seven years before the series, a meteorite struck the Shibuya district in Tokyo. An alien lifeform, known as the Worms, emerged from the meteorite and became a threat to humanity. Souji Tendo has been trained for seven years while waiting for the Kabuto Zecter so that he may properly take up the mantle of Kamen Rider Kabuto. Making many enemies while at the same time meeting other Riders with mysterious origins, Tendou attempts to accomplish his goal at all costs: to destroy all Worms that threaten humanity. He meets ZECT operative Arata Kagami, who later becomes Kamen Rider Gatack. The two soon work together to save humanity from the alien Worms—but not before uncovering the conspiracies within the ZECT organization and the "Natives" species.

== Masked Rider System ==
Zecters, also known as the Masked Rider System (マスクドライダーシステム, Masukudo Raidā Shisutemu), are a compilation of mobile systems that affect space/time. They were created by the Natives, a species of Worm that arrived on Earth 35 years ago. These Natives in turn gave the Zecters to humans so that they may protect them from alien Worms that would arrive later. The Zecters appear instantaneously from the ZECT headquarters to the selected personnel so that they may transform into the respective Rider to fight any Worms in the vicinity. Each Rider (except for the Hopper Riders and the Kabutech Riders) possesses two forms: the bulky armored cocoon-like Masked Form (マスクドフォーム, Masukudo Fōmu) and the sleeker Rider Form (ライダーフォーム, Raidā Fōmu) which can use the Clock Up (クロックアップ, Kurokku Appu) ability, a system that allows the Rider to move at high speed. They also have the ZECTroopers to help them. Worth noting is that the Zecters have a mind of their own and can reject their present user in search of another one if they so choose.

There are eight known Zecters within the Masked Rider System, each allowing the user to become a different Rider. Most Zecters are based on insects, with the exception of the Sasword Zecter, which is based on an arachnid.

- Kamen Rider Kabuto
- Kamen Rider TheBee
- Kamen Rider Drake
- Kamen Rider Sasword
- Kamen Rider Gatack
- Kamen Rider Kick Hopper
- Kamen Rider Punch Hopper
- Kamen Rider Dark Kabuto

There also exist two other Zecters known as the Perfect Zecter and the Hyper Zecter. The Perfect Zecter serves as a primary weapon while the Hyper Zecter is a power-up device that enhances the powers of the original Zecter. Both were only used by Kabuto in the series, but Gatack got to use the Hyper Zecter in the Hyper Battle DVD special.

== Allusions ==
The series made some allusions to the Kamen Rider series. The Masked Rider Project mentioned in the course of the series was said to have started on April 3, 1971. The date was the day the first Kamen Rider show aired for the first time. Additionally, Masked Rider was the title of the American adaptation of Kamen Rider Black RX.

== Episodes ==
No.	Title	Directed by	Written by	Original release date
1	"The Strongest Man"; Transliteration: "Saikyō Otoko" (Japanese: 最強男)	Hidenori Ishida	Shōji Yonemura	January 29, 2006
2	"The First Two-Step Transformation"; Transliteration: "Hatsu Ni-dan Henshin" (Japanese: 初2段変身)	Hidenori Ishida	Shōji Yonemura	February 5, 2006
3	"I Am Justice!!"; Transliteration: "Ore wa Seigi!!" (Japanese: 俺が正義!!)	Naoki Tamura	Shōji Yonemura	February 12, 2006
4	"Love Explanation!!"; Transliteration: "Ai o Toku!!" (Japanese: 愛を説く!!)	Naoki Tamura	Shōji Yonemura	February 19, 2006
5	"Order to Capture!!"; Transliteration: "Hokaku Shirei!!" (Japanese: 捕獲指令!!)	Takao Nagaishi	Shōji Yonemura	February 26, 2006
6	"My Flower"; Transliteration: "Ore-sama no Hana" (Japanese: オレ様の花)	Takao Nagaishi	Shōji Yonemura	March 5, 2006
7	"#2 Appears"; Transliteration: "Ni-gō Shin Tōjō" (Japanese: ２号新登場)	Hidenori Ishida	Shōji Yonemura	March 12, 2006
8	"Angry Tofu"; Transliteration: "Ikareru Tōfu" (Japanese: 怒れる豆腐)	Hidenori Ishida	Shōji Yonemura	March 19, 2006
9	"The Bee's Insanity!!"; Transliteration: "Hachi no Ranshin!!" (Japanese: 蜂の乱心!!)	Naoki Tamura	Shōji Yonemura	March 26, 2006
10	"I'm Not Your Friend"; Transliteration: "Tomo ja Nee" (Japanese: 友じゃねぇ)	Naoki Tamura	Shōji Yonemura	April 2, 2006
11	"The Party Burns"; Transliteration: "Gōkon Moyu" (Japanese: 合コン燃ゆ)	Ryuta Tasaki	Toshiki Inoue	April 9, 2006
12	"The Makeup Thousand-Man Cut"; Transliteration: "Keshō Sen-nin Giri" (Japanese: 化粧千人斬)	Ryuta Tasaki	Toshiki Inoue	April 16, 2006
13	"The Team Dissolves"; Transliteration: "Chīmu Kaisan" (Japanese: チーム解散)	Takao Nagaishi	Shōji Yonemura	April 23, 2006
14	"Back of the Back of the Back"; Transliteration: "Ura no Ura no Ura" (Japanese: 裏の裏の裏)	Takao Nagaishi	Shōji Yonemura	April 30, 2006
15	"The Monster Noted Doctor!?"; Transliteration: "Kaijin Meii!?" (Japanese: 怪人名医!?)	Nobuhiro Suzumura	Toshiki Inoue	May 7, 2006
16	"An Impossible Storm"; Transliteration: "Masaka no Arashi" (Japanese: まさかの嵐)	Nobuhiro Suzumura	Toshiki Inoue	May 14, 2006
17	"Restored Memories!!"; Transliteration: "Yomigaeru Kioku!!" (Japanese: 甦る記憶!!)	Ryuta Tasaki	Toshiki Inoue	May 21, 2006
18	"Farewell, Gon"; Transliteration: "Saraba Gon" (Japanese: さらばゴン)	Ryuta Tasaki	Toshiki Inoue	May 28, 2006
19	"Scorpion Millionaire"; Transliteration: "Sasori Fugō" (Japanese: さそり富豪)	Takao Nagaishi	Toshiki Inoue	June 4, 2006
20	"Eh, Jiiya?"; Transliteration: "Nee, Jiiya?" (Japanese: ねぇじいや?)	Takao Nagaishi	Toshiki Inoue	June 11, 2006
21	"Vs. Stag Beetle"; Transliteration: "Tai Kuwagata" (Japanese: VSクワガタ)	Ryuta Tasaki	Shōji Yonemura	June 25, 2006
22	"Birth of a Special Compilation"; Transliteration: "Tanjō Tokubetsuhen" (Japanese: 誕生特別編)	Ryuta Tasaki	Shōji Yonemura	July 2, 2006
23	"Riddle + Riddle = X"; Transliteration: "Nazo Tasu Nazo Wa Ekkusu" (Japanese: 謎+謎=X)	Naoki Tamura	Shōji Yonemura	July 9, 2006
24	"The Ramen Way"; Transliteration: "Rāmen-dō" (Japanese: ラーメン道)	Naoki Tamura	Shōji Yonemura	July 16, 2006
25	"The Proud Searchlight"; Transliteration: "Ogoru Sōsasen" (Japanese: 驕る捜査線)	Takao Nagaishi	Shōji Yonemura	July 23, 2006
26	"Love That Shook the Earth"; Transliteration: "Gekishin Suru Ai" (Japanese: 激震する愛)	Takao Nagaishi	Shōji Yonemura	July 30, 2006
27	"Me!? A Murderer"; Transliteration: "Ore!? Satsujinhan" (Japanese: 俺!?殺人犯)	Ryuta Tasaki	Toshiki Inoue	August 6, 2006
28	"Why!? Death"; Transliteration: "Naze!? Zetsumei" (Japanese: なぜ!?絶命)	Ryuta Tasaki	Toshiki Inoue	August 13, 2006
29	"The Dark Kitchen"; Transliteration: "Yami Kitchin" (Japanese: 闇キッチン)	Hidenori Ishida	Toshiki Inoue	August 20, 2006
30	"Miso Soup Ascension"; Transliteration: "Misoshiru Shōten" (Japanese: 味噌汁昇天)	Hidenori Ishida	Toshiki Inoue	August 27, 2006
31	"Shocking Fact"; Transliteration: "Shōgeki no Jijitsu" (Japanese: 衝撃の事実)	Takao Nagaishi	Shōji Yonemura	September 3, 2006
32	"Puzzle Unraveled!!"; Transliteration: "Tokeru Nazo!!" (Japanese: 解ける謎!!)	Takao Nagaishi	Shōji Yonemura	September 10, 2006
33	"The Sprouting Adjutant"; Transliteration: "Moeru Fukukan" (Japanese: 萌える副官)	Ryuta Tasaki	Shōji Yonemura	September 17, 2006
34	"Breaking Super Evolution"; Transliteration: "Kudake Chō Shinka" (Japanese: 砕け超進化)	Ryuta Tasaki	Shōji Yonemura	September 24, 2006
35	"The Hellish Brothers"; Transliteration: "Jigōku no Kyōdai" (Japanese: 地獄の兄弟)	Hidenori Ishida	Shōji Yonemura	October 1, 2006
36	"Red Shoes' Recklessness"; Transliteration: "Akai Kutsu Bōsō" (Japanese: 赤い靴暴走)	Hidenori Ishida	Shōji Yonemura	October 8, 2006
37	"School's Ghost Story"; Transliteration: "Gakkō no Kaidan" (Japanese: 学校の怪談)	Takao Nagaishi	Shōji Yonemura	October 15, 2006
38	"The Dangerous Younger Sister"; Transliteration: "Abunai Imōto" (Japanese: あぶない妹)	Takao Nagaishi	Shōji Yonemura	October 22, 2006
39	"The Powerful Black Opponent"; Transliteration: "Kyōteki Kuro Kabu" (Japanese: 強敵黒カブ)	Ryuta Tasaki	Toshiki Inoue	October 29, 2006
40	"The Saddest Battle"; Transliteration: "Saidai no Aisen" (Japanese: 最大の哀戦)	Ryuta Tasaki	Toshiki Inoue	November 12, 2006
41	"The Strongest Defeated"; Transliteration: "Yabureru Saikyō" (Japanese: 敗れる最強)	Hidenori Ishida	Shōji Yonemura	November 19, 2006
42	"Worst Terror vs. Worst Fear"; Transliteration: "Saikyō Tai Saikyō" (Japanese: 最凶VS.最恐)	Hidenori Ishida	Shōji Yonemura	November 26, 2006
43	"That Which We Aim For"; Transliteration: "Ore o Nerau Ore" (Japanese: 俺を狙う俺)	Takayuki Shibasaki	Shōji Yonemura	December 3, 2006
44	"Who You Will Live With"; Transliteration: "Ikiru to wa" (Japanese: 生きるとは)	Takayuki Shibasaki	Shōji Yonemura	December 10, 2006
45	"Christmas Earthquake"; Transliteration: "Kurisumasu Gekishin" (Japanese: Xマス激震)	Takao Nagaishi	Toshiki Inoue	December 17, 2006
46	"Farewell, Tsurugi!!"; Transliteration: "Saraba Tsurugi!!" (Japanese: さらば剣!!)	Takao Nagaishi	Toshiki Inoue	December 24, 2006
47	"Rushing into the Last Chapter"; Transliteration: "Saishūshō Totsunyū" (Japanese: 最終章突入)	Hidenori Ishida	Shōji Yonemura	January 7, 2007
48	"Tendou Dies!!"; Transliteration: "Tendō Shisu!!" (Japanese: 天道死す!!)	Hidenori Ishida	Shōji Yonemura	January 14, 2007
49 (Finale)	"Path of Heaven"; Transliteration: "Ten no Michi" (Japanese: 天の道)	Hidenori Ishida	Shōji Yonemura	January 21, 2007

== God Speed Love ==
The movie of the 2006 Kamen Rider Series, entitled Kamen Rider Kabuto the Movie: God Speed Love (劇場版 仮面ライダーカブト GOD SPEED LOVE, Gekijōban Kamen Raidā Kabuto Goddo Supīdo Rabu), was released in Japan on August 5, double-billed with GoGo Sentai Boukenger the Movie: The Greatest Precious. The film took place in a previous timeline and served as an alternate prequel to the series, featuring three new Riders known as Caucasus, Hercus, and Ketaros.

== Inheritor of Heaven ==
Kamen Rider Kabuto 20th: Inheritor of Heaven (仮面ライダーカブト 20th 天を継ぐもの, Kamen Raidā Kabuto Tuentīsu Ten o Tsugu Mono) is a V-Cinema release scheduled for a limited theatrical release on November 6, 2026, followed by its DVD and Blu-ray release on February 10, 2027. The V-Cinema will take place 20 years after the series' finale and will introduce two new Riders known as Atlas and Giraffa. The V-Cinema was written by Shōji Yonemura and directed by Hidenori Ishida. The theme song is "NEXT LEVEL Pass the tofu Version" performed by Yuki Sato, Hidenori Tokuyama, and Kazuki Kato.

== Hyper Battle Video ==
In Kamen Rider Kabuto: Birth! Gatack Hyper Form!! (仮面ライダーカブト 誕生！ガタックハイパーフォーム!!, Kamen Raidā Kabuto Tanjō! Gatakku Haipā Fōmu!!), Arata Kagami seeks to get the Hyper Zecter just like Souji Tendou, so he tries to emulate Tendou. Once he realizes that he has to be himself, the Hyper Zecter appears and allows him to transform into Kamen Rider Gatack Hyper Form, which only appears in the DVD. The Kabuto and Gatack Zecters speak to Tendou and Kagami throughout the DVD, voiced by Tomokazu Seki and Kōji Yusa, respectively.

== Production ==
The Kamen Rider Kabuto trademark was registered by Toei on October 26, 2005.

== Video game ==
A video game based on the series was produced by Bandai for the PlayStation 2, under the name Kamen Rider Kabuto. Released on November 30, 2006, it is a fighting game featuring all Riders seen in the show and movie, along with Hyper Gatack. The game features 5 different modes of play, ranging from a story mode to several multiplayer modes.

== Novel ==
Novel: Kamen Rider Kabuto (小説 仮面ライダーカブト, Shōsetsu Kamen Raidā Kabuto), written by Shōji Yonemura, is part of a series of spin-off novel adaptions of the Heisei Era Kamen Riders. The mysteries behind Kamen Rider Kabuto are revealed as Tendou Souji fights his final battle with the Worms. After the battle, he travels around the world starting from Bangkok, Thailand to Varanasi, India. During this time, the story followed Arata Kagami as he tries to court with Hiyori Kusakabe. The novel was released on November 30, 2012.

== Cast ==
- Souji Tendou (天道 総司, Tendō Sōji): Hiro Mizushima (水嶋 ヒロ, Mizushima Hiro)
- Arata Kagami (加賀美 新, Kagami Arata): Yuki Sato (佐藤 祐基, Satō Yūki)
- Hiyori Kusakabe (日下部 ひより, Kusakabe Hiyori): Yui Satonaka (里中 唯, Satonaka Yui)
- Sou Yaguruma (矢車 想, Yaguruma Sō): Hidenori Tokuyama (徳山 秀典, Tokuyama Hidenori)
- Shun Kageyama (影山 瞬, Kageyama Shun): Masato Uchiyama (内山 眞人, Uchiyama Masato)
- Daisuke Kazama (風間 大介, Kazama Daisuke): Kazuki Kato (加藤 和樹, Katō Kazuki)
- Tsurugi Kamishiro (神代 剣, Kamishiro Tsurugi): Yusuke Yamamoto (山本 裕典, Yamamoto Yūsuke)
- Renge Takatori (高鳥 蓮華, Takatori Renge): Yuka Teshima (手嶋 ゆか, Teshima Yuka)
- Jyuka Tendou (天道 樹花, Tendō Juka): Natsumi Okumura (奥村 夏未, Okumura Natsumi)
- Shuichi Tadokoro (田所 修一, Tadokoro Shūichi): Yoshiyuki Yamaguchi (山口 祥行, Yamaguchi Yoshiyuki)
- Yuzuki Misaki (岬 祐月, Misaki Yuzuki): Anna Nagata (永田 杏奈, Nagata Anna)
- Gon (ゴン): Airu Kanzaki (神崎 愛瑠, Kanzaki Airu)
- Jiiya (じいや): Yasukiyo Umeno (梅野 泰靖, Umeno Yasukiyo)
- Soichi Kusakabe (日下部 総一, Kusakabe Sōichi): Go Narumi (鳴海 剛, Narumi Gō)
- Satomi Kusakabe (日下部 さとみ, Kusakabe Satomi): Kaori Asano (浅野 香織, Asano Kaori)
- Tendo of 7 Years Ago (7年前の天道, Shichinenmae no Tendō): Sean Wiig (ショーン・ウィーグ, Shōn Wīgu)
- Hiyori of 7 Years Ago (7年前のひより, Shichinenmae no Hiyori): Reina Fujii (藤井 玲奈, Fujii Reina)
- Rena Mamiya (間宮 麗奈, Mamiya Rena): Hitomi Miwa (三輪 ひとみ, Miwa Hitomi)
- Reiji Nogi (乃木 怜治, Nogi Reiji): Tak Sakaguchi (坂口 拓, Sakaguchi Taku)
- Negishi (根岸): Masahiro Kobayashi (小林 正寛, Kobayashi Masahiro)
- Yumiko Takemiya (竹宮 弓子, Takemiya Yumiko): Megumi Nishimuta (西牟田 恵, Nishimuta Megumi)
- Masato Mishima (三島 正人, Mishima Masato): Tomohisa Yuge (弓削 智久, Yuge Tomohisa)
- Riku Kagami (加賀美 陸, Kagami Riku): Hirotarō Honda (本田 博太郎, Honda Hirotarō)

=== Voice cast ===
- ZECTrooper (ゼクトルーパー, Zekutorūpā): Katsumi Shiono (塩野 勝美, Shiono Katsumi)
- Zecters (ゼクター, Zekutā): Surage Gajria (スラージ・ガジリア, Surāji Gajiria)
- Narrator: Eiichiro Suzuki (鈴木 英一郎, Suzuki Eiichirō)

=== Guest cast ===
- Detective (刑事, Keiji; 1): Maroshi Tamura (田村 円, Tamura Maroshi)
- Yuki Tamai (玉井 ユキ, Tamai Yuki; 3): Mika Kikuchi (菊地 美香, Kikuchi Mika)
- Uemura (ウエムラ; 3): Kōhei Murakami (村上 幸平, Murakami Kōhei)
- Shogo Higashi (東 省吾, Higashi Shōgo; 5–6): Atsushi Ogawa (小川 敦史, Ogawa Atsushi)
- Male biker (14): Masaya Kikawada (黄川田 将也, Kikawada Masaya)
- Koji Iguchi (井口 浩二, Iguchi Kōji; 14): Kenzaburo Kikuchi (菊地 謙三郎, Kikuchi Kenzaburō)
- Tatsuhiro Wakabayashi (若林 龍宏, Wakabayashi Tatsuhiro; 15–16): Moro Morooka (モロ 師岡)
- Kazuhiko Sagara (相良 和彦, Sagara Kazuhiko; 27): Hiroyuki Matsumoto (松本 博之, Matsumoto Hiroyuki)
- Ichiro Ikesu (生簀 一郎, Ikesu Ichirō; 29–30): Shinnosuke Abe (阿部 進之介, Abe Shin'nosuke)
- Keiko Kobayashi (小林 恵子, Kobayashi Keiko; 37–38): Kasumi Suzuki (鈴木 かすみ, Suzuki Kasumi)
- Totsuka (戸塚; 39–40): Kenji Anan (阿南 健治, Anan Kenji)
- Oda (オダ; 49): Katsuya Kobayashi (小林 且弥, Kobayashi Katsuya)
- Yamato (ヤマト; 49): Mitsuki Koga (虎牙 光揮, Koga Mitsuki)

== Songs ==
Opening theme

- "NEXT LEVEL"
  - Lyrics: Shoko Fujibayashi
  - Composition & Arrangement: Cher Watanabe
  - Artist: YU-KI (of TRF)
  - Episodes: 1–48

Insert themes

- "FULL FORCE"
  - Lyrics: Shoko Fujibayashi
  - Composition: nishi-ken
  - Arrangement: RIDER CHIPS & Cher Watanabe
  - Artist: RIDER CHIPS
  - Episodes: 2–32
- "LORD OF THE SPEED"
  - Lyrics: Shoko Fujibayashi
  - Composition: Cher Watanabe
  - Arrangement: RIDER CHIPS & Cher Watanabe
  - Artist: RIDER CHIPS featuring Arata Kagami (Yuuki Sato)
  - Episodes: 33–48

== 35th Masked Rider Anniversary File ==
During episodes 23 through 27, this segment called the 35th Masked Rider Anniversary File, acted as a look back to the franchise and an early advertisement for the God Speed Love movie. These look backs are held in a movie theater and the segment is hosted by Soji Tendo (Kamen Rider Kabuto), Arata Kagami (Kamen Rider Gatack), Tetsuki Yamato (Kamen Rider Ketaros), Yuzuki Misaki, and Masato Mishima. During these five segments, they discuss the history of the Kamen Rider franchise, sometimes in a comedic tone, but always with serious background music.

- Episode 23 (Rider Kicks): The group watches and Yamato narrates the variations of Rider Kicks during the course of the years. Yamato mentions the Rider Double Kick of Kamen Riders 1 and 2, Kamen Rider V3's V3 Kick, Kamen Rider X's X Kick, and Kamen Rider Super-1's ten kicks. In the end, Kagami stands up and does his own Rider Kick (he even shouts the attack name) and falling into his seat with Yuzuki looking. Tendo asks Yamato, "Who are you?"
- Episode 24 (Criminal Organizations): The group watches and learns about the different criminal organizations the Kamen Riders had to fight. Villains include Shocker & Gel-Shocker in the first Kamen Rider, Destron from Kamen Rider V3, and King Dark (of the Government of Darkness) in Kamen Rider X. Footage of Black Satan, the first enemy of Kamen Rider Stronger, is also shown. Tendo then supposes that it is the Kamen Rider's destiny to fight an organization. Mishima tells Tendo that ZECT will show no mercy to anyone who fights them. Yamato then says that he will definitely smash Neo-ZECT for rebelling against and splitting off from ZECT.
- Episode 25 (Rhinoceros Beetle-Themed Kamen Riders): The group watches Kamen Rider Stronger, and Kagami quickly thinks that Stronger himself is Kabuto, then looks at Tendo confused. Misaki corrects him, informing him that this is a different Rider, using the rhinoceros beetle as a design. Mishima then announces that it is Kamen Rider Stronger. The camera then zooms on Tendo's face as he says that while this Rider may be Stronger, he (referring to himself) is the strongest. Tendo pronounces "Stronger" and "Strongest" in English, (due to the fact that Hiro Mizushima, who portrays Tendou, is fluent in English). Yamato then also speaks of the Kabutech Riders (Caucasus [Caucasus beetle], Heracus [Hercules beetle], and Ketaros [centaurus beetle], the last of whom Yamato happens to be), which are also Rhinoceros Beetle Riders (as the Caucasus, Hercules, and Centaurus beetles are rhinoceros beetle sub-species). Also, despite being a Rhinoceros Beetle Rider, Kamen Rider Blade (also a Hercules beetle) was omitted. At the end, Tendo stands up and miniature hexagons with Tendo's face appear, forming a compound eye pattern as Tendo says once again that he is "the man who walks the path of heaven that will rule over everything."
- Episode 26 (Riders Everywhere): The group watches Kamen Rider and Yamato comments on Skyrider's Sailing Jump, then says that the Riders can go anywhere around the world. In addition, they are not restricted to the ground. Then, Misaki mentions the Riders can even now go into space. During this segment, they watch footage of Kamen Riders 1 through ZX training with each other in Kamen Rider 1's base on Arizona in the final episodes of Kamen Rider Black RX, followed by footage from God Speed Love. Tendo then coins a variant of his trademark quote ("Now, I will truly walk down the path of heaven and rule over all.").
- Episode 27 (Kamen Rider Ultimate Forms): Kamen Rider Stronger's upgrade is not mentioned (as it is not an "Ultimate Form", but rather a temporary power upgrade) and the short starts with Yamato commenting on Black RX and his modes RX Robo Rider and RX Bio Rider. It then moves on to Kamen Rider Kuuga Ultimate Form, Kamen Rider Agito Shining Form, Kamen Rider Ryuki Survive, Kamen Rider Faiz Blaster Form, Kamen Rider Blade King Form, and Kamen Rider Armed Hibiki. Suddenly, Yamato and Tendo are about to duel with the others looking on and shown on screen is Kabuto's Ultimate Form, Hyper Form.

== Parodies ==
Episode 327-B of Sgt. Frog titled "Keroro, Invasion in a Blink!" (ケロロ あっというまの侵略！であります, Keroro Attoiuma no Shinryaku! de arimasu) features the members of the Keroro Platoon trying to invade Earth in Clock Up mode.

== Broadcasts and home video ==
- In its home country of Japan, the series originally first aired on Sunday Mornings at 8:00 JST on the Super Hero Time block on TV Asahi and other ANN affiliates, from January 29, 2006 until January 21, 2007, where it concluded at 49 episodes. While the series was still airing during its original broadcast from August 4, 2006 to July 21, 2007 months after it concluded, Toei Video released the series on DVD. 12 volumes were released with 4 episodes each, while the final volume contains five episodes. Then in 2015, the series was then given a Blu-Ray release and spread throughout three boxsets. January 9 for the first boxset, March 13 for the second and May 13 for the third.
- In South Korea, the series was given a Korean dub and aired as Masked Rider Kabuto (가면라이더 가부토 Gamyeon Raideo Gabuto) in 2008.
- In Southeast Asia, an English dub was produced in Singapore by Voiceovers Unlimited as Masked Rider Kabuto. It aired on Okto in that country starting on June 20, 2009.
  - In the Philippines, the English dub was licensed to air on the Toonami block on Cartoon Network.
  - In Malaysia, this show was dubbed in Malay by FKN Dubbing and aired on NTV7.
  - In Thailand, the VCD and DVD rights are owned by Dream Express (Dex) Co., Ltd. and it has aired on four different TV channels, including cable, satellite, and open TV.
  - In the Chinese-speaking world, Both Cantonese and Mandarin (Taiwan dialect) dubs were produced and aired in Hong Kong and Taiwan respectively.
    - In Hong Kong, this show was dubbed in Cantonese Chinese as 幪面超人甲鬥王 and was broadcast on TVB from December 12, 2008 to November 7, 2009 with all episodes dubbed and airing once a week.
    - In Taiwan, this show was dubbed in Mandarin Chinese as 假面騎士KABUTO and broadcast on the Toonami block on Cartoon Network from January 5, 2009 to March 12, 2009 with all episodes dubbed and airing on the weeknights.
