= Anna Nagata =

Japanese actress

- 永田 杏奈
- Born: March 29, 1982 (age 43); Tokyo, Japan
- Occupation: Actress
- Years active: 2000-present
- Height: 1.58 m (5 ft 2 in)
- Children: 1

Anna Nagata (永田 杏奈, Nagata Anna, born 29 March 1982) is a Japanese actress best known for her performances in One Missed Call and Battle Royale.

== Personal life ==
In 2021, she gave birth to her first child.

== Filmography ==
=== Movies ===
Year	Title	Role	Notes / Ref.
2000	Battle Royale	Hirono Shimizu	
2004	One Missed Call	Yoko Okazaki	
2006	Kamen Rider Kabuto: God Speed Love	Yuzuki Misaki	
2006	Master of Thunder	Anna	

=== TV ===
Year	Title	Role	Notes / Ref.
2006-07	Kamen Rider Kabuto	Yuzuki Misaki	
