= Shōji Yonemura =

Japanese writer from Fukuoka Prefecture

- 米村 正二
- Born: Fukuoka Prefecture, Japan
- Occupation: Scriptwriter
- Notable credit(s): Kamen Rider Kabuto, Smile PreCure!

Shōji Yonemura (米村 正二, Yonemura Shōji) is a Japanese writer from Fukuoka Prefecture. He is known mainly for his work in anime and tokusatsu. After having graduated from Tokyo Zokei University, he worked as a freelance writer in Arakawa and would attend various film festivals. Then, he studied under Hiroshi Kashiwabara and others at a scenario course sponsored by the Japan Writers Guild. Awarded as winner of the 7th Otomo Shoji Award for scenario in 1994.

== Television ==
- Series head writer denoted in bold

=== Anime ===
- Lupin III: The Pursuit of Harimao's Treasure (1995)
- Bonobono (1995)
- Saint Tail (1995-1996)
- Anpanman (1995–present)
- Wankorobee (1996-1997)
- Lupin III: Walther P-38/Island of Assassins (1997)
- Manmaru the Ninja Penguin (1997-1998)
- Berserk (1997-1998)
- Pokémon the Series (1997-2023)
- Bomberman B-Daman Bakugaiden (1998)
- The Adventures of Mini-Goddess (1998)
- **Monster Rancher** (1999-2001)
- **Figure 17** (2001-2002)
- Lupin III Episode 0: First Contact (2002)
- Cyborg 009: The Cyborg Soldier (2002)
- Hanada Shōnen Shi (2002)
- Daigunder (2002)
- Ninja Scroll: The Series (2003)
- Croquette! (2003-2004)
- **Uninhabited Planet Survive!** (2003-2004)
- Agatha Christie's Great Detectives Poirot and Marple (2004-2005)
- Gunparade Orchestra (2006)
- **Glass Fleet** (2006)
- Death Note (2006-2007)
- Silk Road Boy Yuto (2006-2007)
- The Cuties (2006-2008)
- Working Kids, Meister Hamster Team (2007-2008)
- MapleStory (2007-2008)
- **Stitch!** (2008-2009)
- **Negibozu no Asataro** (2008-2009)
- **Guin Saga** (2009)
- **Kaidan Restaurant** (2009-2010)
- Fairy Tail (2009-2016, 2018–2019)
- HeartCatch PreCure! (2010-2011)
- Digimon Fusion (2010-2012)
- Little Battlers Experience (2011)
- Suite PreCure (2011)
- **Smile PreCure!** (2012-2013)
- Hunter × Hunter (2012-2014)
- DokiDoki! Precure (2013-2014)
- **One Piece** (2013–present)
- **Parasyte -the maxim-** (2014-2015)
- Ushio and Tora (2015-2016)
- Tiger Mask W (2016-2017)
- Yu-Gi-Oh! VRAINS (2017-2018)
- Karakuri Circus (2018-2019)
- **Wave, Listen to Me!** (2020)
- Butt Detective (2020)
- Talentless Nana (2020)
- **Shaman King** (2021-2022)
- **Futsal Boys!!!!!** (2022)
- **Bad Girl** (2025)
- **Hotel Inhumans** (2025)
- **The World's Strongest Witch** (2026)

=== Live action ===
- **Sh15uya** (2005)
- Kamen Rider Hibiki (2005)
- **Kamen Rider Kabuto** (2006)
- Kamen Rider Den-O (2007)
- Kamen Rider Kiva (2008)
- **Kamen Rider G** (2009)
- **Kamen Rider Decade** (2009): eps 14-31
- Kamen Rider OOO (2010-2011)

== Film ==
=== Anime ===
- Mt. Head (2002)
- Otogi-Jūshi Akazukin (2005)
- Smile Precure! the Movie: Big Mismatch in a Picture Book (2012)
- Anpanman: Apple Boy and Everyone's Hope (2014)
- Hunter × Hunter: Phantom Rouge (2013)
- Pokémon the Movie: I Choose You! (2017)
- Fairy Tail: Dragon Cry (2017)
- Pretty Cure Super Stars! (2018)
- Anpanman: Baikinman and Lulun in the Picture Book (2024)

=== Live action ===
- Hinokio (2005)
- Kamen Rider Kabuto: God Speed Love (2006)
- Kamen Rider Decade: All Riders vs. Dai-Shocker (2009)
- Kamen Rider x Kamen Rider W & Decade: Movie War 2010 (2009)
  - Kamen Rider Decade: The Last Story
  - Movie War 2010
- Kamen Rider x Kamen Rider x Kamen Rider The Movie: Cho-Den-O Trilogy (2010)
  - Episode Yellow: Treasure de End Pirates
- OOO, Den-O, All Riders: Let's Go Kamen Riders (2011)
- Kamen Rider x Super Sentai: Super Hero Taisen (2012)
- Kamen Rider x Super Sentai x Space Sheriff: Super Hero Taisen Z (2013)
- Heisei Rider vs. Shōwa Rider: Kamen Rider Taisen feat. Super Sentai (2014)
- Super Hero Taisen GP: Kamen Rider 3 (2015)
- Ultra Super Hero Taisen (2017)
- Kamen Rider Den-O: Pretty Den-O Appears! (2020)
