= Yuki Sato (actor) =

Japanese actor

- 佐藤 祐基
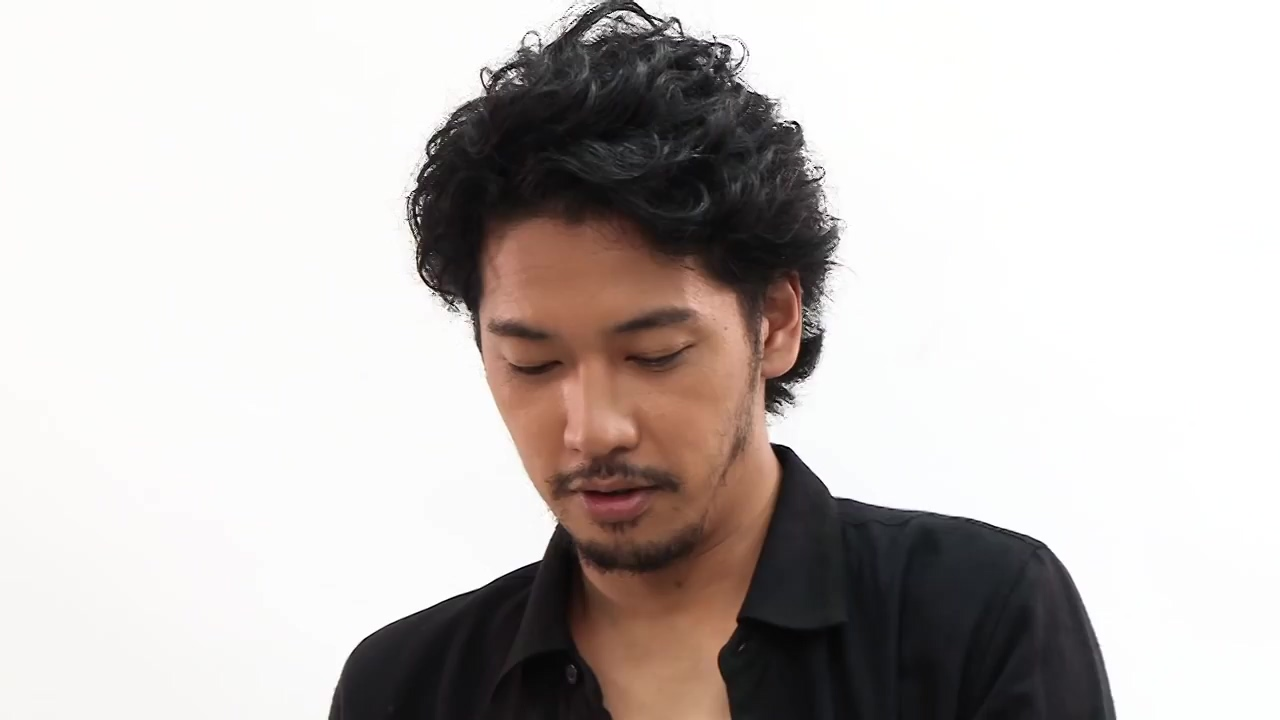
- Sato in the Complete Selection Modification Gatack Zecter & Hyper Zecter commercial
- Born: February 22, 1984 (age 42); Shinagawa, Tokyo, Japan
- Other names: Tomohito Sato (佐藤 智仁, Satō Tomohito); Jin Sato (佐藤 汛, Satō Jin)
- Occupation: Actor
- Years active: 2005–present
- Agents: Ever Green Entertainment (present); Top Coat
- Notable credit: Kamen Rider Kabuto as Arata Kagami
- Spouse: Sono Duly (m. 2020)
- Website: www.jinfc.jp

Yuki Sato (佐藤 祐基, Satō Yūki; also written as Yuuki Sato) is a Japanese actor from Shinagawa, Tokyo, best known for portraying Arata Kagami/Kamen Rider Gatack in the tokusatsu series Kamen Rider Kabuto and a character named Mr. Shakedown in Yakuza 0. For a brief period, he performed under the names Tomohito Sato (佐藤 智仁, Satō Tomohito) and Jin Sato (佐藤 汛, Satō Jin).

== Biography ==
Sato was born on February 22, 1984. His hobbies include baseball, snowboarding, and playing guitar and bass.

On June 20, 2020, he announced his marriage to model Sono Duly.

== Filmography ==
=== Television ===
Year	Title	Role	Network	Notes
2005	Gokusen 2	Yuuki Kojima	NTV	
2005	Water Boys 2005 Natsu	Teruo	Fuji TV	
2005	1 Litre of Tears	Keisuke Asō	Fuji TV	
2006	Kamen Rider Kabuto	Arata Kagami/Kamen Rider Gattack	TV Asahi	
2007	Hotelier	Yōsuke Kitano	TV Asahi	
2007	Mito Kōmon	Gohei	TBS	Episode 12
2007	Sakurasho no Onnatachi	Keisuke Natsuki	TV Asahi	
2007	Hataraki Man	Tamura	NTV	Episode 7
2008	Ten to Chi to	Genzaburō	TV Asahi	
2008	Hokaben	Tōru Kawahara	NTV	Episode 3
2008	Shiro to Kuro	Masato Kiryū	Tokai TV, Fuji TV	
2008	Giragira	Kenta Ichikawa (Hideyoshi)	ABC, TV Asahi	
2009	Voice	Akira Hanei	Fuji TV	
2009	Haken no Oscar	Takeshi Uchimura	NHK	
2009	Untouchable	Shunichi Takafuji	ABC, TV Asahi	
2010	Tenshi no Wakemae	Takashi Ochiai	NHK	
2010	Strawberry Night	Keiichi Tatsumi	Fuji TV	
2010	FACE MAKER	Ken Tasaka	YTV	Episode 7
2011	Hanazakari no Kimitachi e	Makoto Kagurazaka	Fuji TV	
2011	Yonimo Kimyona Monogatari 2011		Fuji TV	
2012	Kuruma no Futari ~ Tokyo Drive Stories	Noboru Mikami	TwellV	Episode 6
2012	Kurohyō 2: Ryū ga Gotoku Ashura Hen	Makoto Yashiro	MBS	
2012	Kagi no Kakatta Heya	Katsumi Inuyama	Fuji TV	Episode 9
2012	GTO	Ryōji Tsujimoto	KTV	Episode 3
2012	Sousa Chizu no Onna	Keiichi Sawamura	TV Asahi	Episode 5
2012	Yūsha Yoshihiko to Akuryō no Kagi	Kōsuke	TV Tokyo	Episode 10
2013	Last Hope	Kōsuke Miyamoto	Fuji TV	Episode 1
2013	Strawberry Night: After the Invisible Rain	Keiichi Tatsumi	Fuji TV	
2013	Gekai Hatomura Shugoro: Shirakaba Kougen e no Satsujin Shoutaijou	Mamoru Yasuda	Fuji TV	
2013	Otasukeya Jinpachi	Keita Masuda	YTV	Episode 9
2013	Saikou no Rikon	Tatsuya Tsunami	Fuji TV	Episode 10
2013	Otenki Oneesan	Ryōichi Mase	TV Asahi	Episode 4
2013	Iryu Sosa	Katsuto Ichiba	TV Asahi	Episode 6
2013	Kagi no Nai Yume o Miru		WOWOW	Episode 1
2013	Shomuni 2013	Ōgawara	Fuji TV	Episode 9, Final Episode
2013	Outdoor Rock'n Roll	Satō	BS Asahi	
2013	Sho Kyoto Renzoku Satsujin Jiken × Gekai Hatomura Shugoro	Suguru Hada	Fuji TV	
2013	Higanjima		MBS	Episode 3
2014	Kinkyu Torishirabeshitsu	Sasaki	TV Asahi	Episode 1
2014	HAMU -Kouan Keisatsu no Otoko-		Fuji TV	
2014	Sanokuen Jiken		TV Asahi	
2014	Shitsuren Chocolatier	Kurashina	Fuji TV	Episode 5, Episode 6
2014	Team Batista 4 Raden Meikyu	Yōichi Mitamura	KTV	Episode 7, Episode 8
2014	Roosevelt Game	Yōnosuke Saruta	TBS	
2014	Inochi Aru Kagiri Tatakae, Soshite Ikinukunda	Takeshi Yamamura	Fuji TV	
2015	Itsutsu Boshi Tourist	Takatoshi Nagatomo	YTV	Final Episode
2015	Keiji 7-nin	Eiji Tokuyama	TV Asahi	Final Episode
2015	Yamamoto Shūgorō Ninjō Jidaigeki	Chōjirō	BS Japan	Episode 6
2016	Tokusō Seven ~Keishichō Sōsa Ikka 7-gakari~	Naoki Hara	TV Asahi	
2016	Suizokukan Girl	Sōma Satō	NHK	Episode 5
2016	Mohōhan	Shiroshita	TV Tokyo	Episode 2
2019	Kamen Rider Zi-O	Arata Kagami/Kamen Rider Gattack/Kamen Rider Kabuto	TV Asahi	Episodes 37–38

=== Films ===
Year	Title	Role
2006	LOVEHOTELS	Yūji
2006	Kamen Rider Kabuto: God Speed Love	Arata Kagami
2008	Hey Japanese! Do You Believe Peace, Love and Understanding? 2008	Shinmai
2009	Shonen Merikensack	Young Akio, Akio's son
2009	Gokusen: The Movie	Yuuki Kojima
2011	Thanatos	Katsumi Tanabuki
2011	Genji Monogatari: Sennen no Nazo	Fujiwara no Korechika
2012	Salvage Mice	Malik
2014	Ryusei	Ryūta Ogata
2017	Shinjuku Swan II	Noboru Ide
2018	Junpei, Think Again	
