= Jun Watanabe (actor) =

Jun Watanabe (渡辺 淳, Watanabe Jun) (born June 21, 1982) is a Japanese stunt performer and suit actor from Takarazuka, Hyōgo Prefecture, affiliated with Japan Action Enterprises. He has been cast in many leading roles in the Super Sentai and Kamen Rider series, portraying a diverse range of characters. He has a child with his current wife. He is currently the action director of the Kamen Rider series, having taken up the role starting with Kamen Rider Zero-One

== Stunt/Suit Actor Roles ==
=== Super Sentai Series ===
- Juken Sentai Gekiranger (2007–2008) - GekiChopper
- Juken Sentai Gekiranger vs. Boukenger (2008) - GekiChopper
- Engine Sentai Go-onger (2008–2009) - Go-on Gold
- Kishiryu Sentai Ryusoulger (2019-2020) - Master Blue

=== Kamen Rider Series ===
- Kamen Rider Ryuki (2002-2003) - Kamen Rider Odin
- Kamen Rider Ryuki: Episode Final (2002) - Kamen Rider Ryuga
- Kamen Rider 555 (2003–2004) - Dragon, Orphnoch, Arch Orphnoch
- Kamen Rider 555: Paradise Lost (2003) - Orphnoch
- Kamen Rider Blade (2004–2005) - Kamen Rider Leangle, Undead
- Kamen Rider Hibiki (2005–2006) - Kamen Rider Todoroki
- Kamen Rider Hibiki & The Seven Senki (2005) - Kamen Rider Todoroki
- Kamen Rider Kabuto (2006–2007) - Kamen Rider Sasword, Scorpio Worm, Kamen Rider Dark Kabuto, Shadow Troopers
- Kamen Rider Kabuto: God Speed Love (2006) - Kamen Rider Sasword, Kamen Rider TheBee
- Kamen Rider Den-O (2006–2007) Imagin (19-24)
- Kamen Rider Den-O: I'm Born! (2007) Imagin
- Kamen Rider Kiva (2008–2009) - Fangire
- Kamen Rider Den-O & Kiva: Climax Deka (2008) - Imagin
- Kamen Rider Decade (2009) - Kamen Rider KickHopper, Kamen Rider Kaixa, Kamen Rider Ryuki, Kamen Rider Faiz, Kamen Rider Agito, Kamen Rider G3, Kamen Rider Exceed Gills, Kamen Rider Blade, Kamen Rider Sasword, Kamen Rider Den-O, Kamen Rider Decade (15, 18), Kamen Rider Kabuto, Kamen Rider TheBee, Kamen Rider Hibiki, Kamen Rider Todoroki, Kamen Rider Dark Kiva, Kamen Rider Lance, Kamen Rider Hercus、Kamen Rider Black RX/Robo Rider, Kamen Rider Amazon, Grongi, Beetle Fangire, Fangire, Undead, Orphnoch, Apollo Geist
- Kamen Rider Decade: All Riders vs. Dai-Shocker (2009) - Kamen Rider 1, Kamen Rider Super-1, Kamen Rider Decade
- Net Edition Kamen Rider Decade: All Riders Super Spin-off (2009) - Himself (Jun Watanabe/Child X) (Non-Suit Actor Role), Kamen Rider Todoroki
- Kamen Rider W (2009–2010) - Nasca Dopant, Weather Dopant, R Nasca Dopant, Dopants
- Kamen Rider × Kamen Rider W & Decade: Movie War 2010 (2009) - Nasca Dopant, Dummy Dopant
- Kamen Rider W Forever: A to Z/The Gaia Memories of Fate (2010) - Kamen Rider Eternal, T2 Weather Dopant
- Kamen Rider OOO (2010–2011) - Kazari, Yummy
- Kamen Rider × Kamen Rider OOO & W Featuring Skull: Movie War Core (2010) - Kazari, Armored Warrior Inhumanoid, Kamen Rider Double
- OOO, Den-O, All Riders: Let's Go Kamen Riders (2011) - Kamen Rider New Den-O, Kikaider 01, Shocker Greeed, Mole Imagin
- Kamen Rider W Returns: Kamen Rider Eternal (2011) - Kamen Rider Eternal
- Kamen Rider OOO Wonderful: The Shogun and the 21 Core Medals (2011) - Kazari
- Kamen Rider × Kamen Rider Fourze & OOO: Movie War Mega Max (2011) - Kamen Rider Poseidon
- Kamen Rider Fourze (2011-2012) - Libra Zodiarts, Scorpion Zodiarts, Sagittarius Zodiarts
- Kamen Rider × Super Sentai: Super Hero Taisen (2012) - Kamen Rider Decade
- Kamen Rider Fourze the Movie: Everyone, Space Is Here! (2012) - Libra Zodiarts, Black Knight
- Kamen Rider Wizard (2012-2013) - Kamen Rider Beast, White Wizard, Phoenix
- Kamen Rider × Kamen Rider Wizard & Fourze: Movie War Ultimatum (2012) - Kamen Rider Beast, Sanagiman, Inazuman, Phoenix
- Kamen Rider × Super Sentai × Space Sheriff: Super Hero Taisen Z (2013) - Kamen Rider Beast
- Kamen Rider Wizard in Magic Land (2013) - Kamen Rider Beast
- Kamen Rider Gaim (2013-2014) - Kamen Rider Zangetsu/Zangetsu Shin, Kamen Rider Bravo
- Kamen Rider × Kamen Rider Gaim & Wizard: The Fateful Sengoku Movie Battle (2013) - Kamen Rider Zangetsu, Kamen Rider Beast
- Heisei Riders vs. Shōwa Riders: Kamen Rider Taisen feat. Super Sentai (2014) - Kamen Rider Decade, Kamen Rider Double, Kamen Rider Zangetsu Shin
- Kamen Rider Gaim: Great Soccer Battle! Golden Fruits Cup! (2014) - Kamen Rider Zangetsu Shin
- Kamen Rider Drive (2014-2015) - Kamen Rider Mach
- Kamen Rider × Kamen Rider Drive & Gaim: Movie War Full Throttle (2014) - Kamen Rider Zangetsu/Zangetsu Shin, Kamen Rider Mach
- Kamen Rider Ghost (2015-2016) - Kamen Rider Specter
- Kamen Rider Ex-Aid (2016-2017) - Kamen Rider Brave
- Kamen Rider Build (2017-2018) - Night Rogue, Kamen Rider Rogue

==== Chouseishin Series ====
- Chouseishin Gransazer (2003-2004) Sazer Tragos

== Non-suit Actor Roles ==
- Samurai Sentai Shinkenger (2009–2010) - Police officer
