= List of Kamen Rider Decade characters in the Nine Worlds =

The characters of Kamen Rider Decade exist among various iterations of reality within the series referred to as an A.R. World (Another Rider's/Alternate Reality). The Nine Worlds (9つの世界, Kokonotsu no Sekai) are the A.R. Worlds that are based on the previous entries of the Kamen Rider Series that have aired during the Heisei period of Japanese history. Each differs in some way from the series on which it was based.

== World of Kuuga ==
The World of Kuuga (クウガの世界, Kūga no Sekai) is the version of reality where Kamen Rider Kuuga takes place. It was the world where Yusuke Onodera originated from before he joined Tsukasa in his journey. The backdrop used to arrive in this world shows a city with police cars and Mount Hitoki (灯溶山, Hitoki-yama) in the background. Within this A.R. World, Tsukasa assumes the guise of a police officer with the talent of understanding and speaking the Gurongi language.

=== Ai Yashiro ===
Ai Yashiro (八代 藍, Yashiro Ai), referred to as "Big Sis" (あねさん, Ane-san) by Yusuke, is a detective and the leading operative of the police force formed to fight the Gurongi. She mistakes Decade for "Unidentified Life Form #10" (未確認生命体十号, Mikakunin Seimeitai Jūgō) after Decade destroys Baberu. While investigating the lair of the Gurongi to take out the resting Gamio, she and her group are overwhelmed by the miasma caused by the Gurongi leader's revival. However, Yusuke is unable to save her in time because the poison she breathed in later killed her. Prior to her death, she makes Yusuke promise that he will fight to protect everyone's smiles.

Ai Yashiro is portrayed by Hiroko Sato (佐藤 寛子, Satō Hiroko).

=== N·Gamio·Zeda ===
Wolf Monster N·Gamio·Zeda (オオカミ種怪人 ン・ガミオ・ゼダ, Ōkami-shu Kaijin N Gamio Zeda) is the king of the Gurongi in the World of Kuuga;, he is also called "The Ultimate Darkness" (究極の闇, Kyūkyoku no Yami). He refers to himself as otherworldly because he should have never been revived, a fact that even he seems to believe, wondering why he was awakened. He is sealed and the Gurongi are attempting to unseal him with a Gegibasu Gegeru (ゲギバスゲゲル; Sacred Game), targeting five police women without spilling blood to revive him. Though they obtain four kills, Tsukasa uses Ai as bait to lure the Gurongi out and gives her a nose bleed to ruin the Gegeru. The effects of the distortion revive Gamio anyway, and he uses his power to convert every human corpse within his Miasmic aura into a Gurongi. Although his ultimate goal is to have his sired Gurongi destroy each other, Gamio is destroyed by Kuuga and Decade performing a combo attack.

N·Gamio·Zeda is voiced by Fumihiko Tachiki (立木 文彦, Tachiki Fumihiko), who was the narrator for Kamen Rider Kuuga.

=== Gurongi ===
The Gurongi Tribe (グロンギ族, Gurongi-zoku) are a mysterious, ancient civilization that can transform into monsters to kill people for their ruthless game, or Gegeru (ゲゲル) in the Gurongi Language. They are referred to by the police as Unidentified Life Forms (未確認生命体, Mikakunin Seimeitai) and are named in a "Group-Species-Creature type" order.

- Me·Garido·Gi (メ・ギャリド・ギ, Me Gyarido Gi): A hermit crab monster of the Me Group, labeled Unidentified Life Form #7 (未確認生命体七号, Mikakunin Seimeitai Nana-gō). He battles Kuuga and is destroyed by his Dragon Form's Splash Dragon attack.
- La·Doldo·Gu (ラ・ドルド・グ, Ra Dorudo Gu): A condor monster of the La Group, the judges of the Gegeru, labeled Unidentified Life Form #8 (未確認生命体八号, Mikakunin Seimeitai Hachi-gō). He fights Kuuga and attempts to flee before being destroyed by Kuuga who uses Pegasus Form's Blast Pegasus attack.
- Go·Babel·Da (ゴ・バベル・ダ, Go Baberu Da): A bison monster of the Go Group that is labeled "Unidentified Life Form #9" (未確認生命体九号, Mikakunin Seimeitai Kyū-gō). Baberu is forced by Decade to reveal the nature of the Gegeru before being destroyed by Decade's Dimension Kick.
- Go·Bemiu·Gi (ゴ・ベミウ・ギ): A female sea snake Gurongi. She oversees Gamio's revival, she is destroyed by Decade.
- Me·Byran·Gi (メ・ビラン・ギ, Me Biran Gi): A piranha monster that is one of the leading Gurongi overseeing Gamio's revival. He is destroyed by Kuuga's Mighty Kick when he attempts to intervene in the battle between Kuuga and Decade.

N·Gamio·Zeda is able to create various Gurongi from human corpses using his miasma, but some are later absorbed by him in a last effort to defeat Kuuga and Decade. The remaining Gurongi died after Gamio is defeated.

== World of Kiva ==
The World of Kiva (キバの世界, Kiba no Sekai) is the version of reality where Kamen Rider Kiva takes place. Unlike the original series, this world allows Fangires and humans to coexist, with the King's servants destroying the rebellious Fangires. The backdrop that allows entry into the World of Kiva depicts a nighttime cityscape with Castle Doran emerging from a building. Within this A.R. World, Tsukasa assumes the identity of a violinist with the talent of playing a violin solo similar to those of Otoya and Wataru Kurenai.

=== Wataru ===
Wataru (ワタル) is a twelve-year-old half-Fangire boy, having the ability to transform into Kamen Rider Kiva (仮面ライダーキバ, Kamen Raidā Kiba) with the aid of Kivat-bat the 3rd. Referred to as the Prince (王子, Ōji) by his servants, Wataru is reluctant to claim the title of King (キング, Kingu) of the Fangires. He finds the overseeing of the ceasefire between humans and Fangires a very troublesome and unnerving task due to his fear of making friends and losing control over his Fangire impulses around them. But events leading to the Beetle Fangire attempting to disrupt the peace allows Wataru gets over this fear and takes his place as the official King of Fangires.

He later appears in the World of the Rider War as his reality is absorbed into it. Leading the Riders of his world, Wataru refuses to listen to Tsukasa and Yusuke in uniting all Riders to defeat Dai-Shocker and stop the convergence of the worlds, while in grief over IXA's death. He even went so far to allow the Queen of the Fangires, Yuki, to marry Apollo Geist for the World of Kiva to have an advantage over the other A.R. Worlds, but later changes his mind when the Fangire betrayed them to Dai-Shocker. After defeating Super Apollo Geist, the convergence of the worlds continues and the World of Kiva and Wataru disappear. However, in Kamen Rider × Kamen Rider W & Decade: Movie War 2010, he is resurrected after Tsukasa has been killed by Kamen Rider Kiva-la. He later appears alongside the Riders of the Nine Worlds to revive Tsukasa and help him battle Super Shocker, assuming Emperor Form with the help of Decade's K-Touch and later uses Castle Doran to fight the Super Crisis Fortress.

Wataru is portrayed by Arashi Fukasawa (深澤 嵐, Fukasawa Arashi).

=== Kivat-bat the 3rd ===
Kivat-bat the 3rd (キバットバットIII世, Kibattobatto Sansei) is the third generation of the Kivat-bat Family (キバットバット家, Kibattobatto Ke). He formed a partnership with Wataru to give him the power of Kiva, attaching to the Kivat Belt (キバットベルト, Kibatto Beruto) to allow his human partner to transform and use other abilities through the Fuestles.

Tomokazu Sugita (杉田 智和, Sugita Tomokazu) reprises his role voicing Kivat-bat the 3rd in the character's World of Kiva incarnation.

=== Arms Monsters ===
The Arms Monsters (アームズモンスター, Āmuzu Monsutā) are servants of Kiva, each the last of his kind. Composed of Garulu (ガルル, Garuru) of the Wolfen Race (ウルフェン族, Urufen Zoku), Basshaa (バッシャー, Basshā) of the Merman Race (マーマン族, Māman Zoku), and Dogga (ドッガ) of the Franken Race (フランケン族, Furanken Zoku), they support Kiva by turning into the weapons that allow Kiva to change form. They are absorbed into Beetle Fangire's breast plate and shoulder armor when they question their new king's intentions of removing the human/Fangire coexistence law.

In addition to these alternate versions of the Arms Monsters, the original versions appear in the timeline within the World of Den-O in The Onigashima Warship, where the wayward Urataros, Kintaros, and Ryutaros hide within Jiro (Garulu), Ramon (Basshaa), and Riki (Dogga), respectively until they can be rescued.

Isshin Chiba (千葉 一伸, Chiba Isshin), Kōki Miyata (宮田 幸季, Miyata Kōki), and Takaya Kuroda (黒田 崇矢, Kuroda Takaya), voice Garulu, Basshaa, and Dogga, respectively. Their original incarnations in The Onigashima Battleship are portrayed by Kenji Matsuda (松田 賢二, Matsuda Kenji), Yuuki Ogoe (小越 勇輝, Ogoe Yūki), and Eiji Takigawa (滝川 英治, Takigawa Eiji) respectively.

=== Ryo Itoya ===
Ryo Itoya (糸矢 僚, Itoya Ryō) is a strange young man who is in actuality the Spider Fangire (スパイダーファンガイア, Supaidā Fangaia). He is the first Fangire that Tsukasa and Natsumi encounter, and reveals to them the truce that exists between Humans and Fangires while posing for a photo in the Hikari Studio.

Sohto (創斗, Sōto) reprises his role as Ryo Itoya in the character's World of Kiva incarnation.

=== Beetle Fangire ===
The Beetle Fangire (ビートルファンガイア, Bītoru Fangaia), whose true name is Attonement of the Garden Divided, the International Dateline (贖罪の園を分断する、日付変更線, Shokuzai no Sono o Bundan suru, Hizukehenkōsen), is the previous King of the Fangire Race and a member of Insect Class (インセクトクラス, Insekuto Kurasu) Tribe. He was exiled for loving a human woman who gave birth to his half-breed successor, Wataru. Seeing the coexistence and peace between the two races as nothing more than a farce for his son's sake, the Beetle Fangire breaks the peace by attacking humans to gather their Life Energy and reclaim his title, even stealing Kivat from Wataru. His actions of removing the law to restart past conflicts between the two races provide the motivation for Wataru to step up and truly claim his place as King of the Fangires. In the end, he is weakened by Decade's Kiva Arrow, then fatally wounded by a Dimension Kick/Darkness Moon Break combo. Revealing that he knew of the Fangire's true identity and intent before he dies, Tsukasa plays a final song for him before the man shatters.

The Beetle Fangire is portrayed by Mansaku Ikeuchi (池内 万作, Ikeuchi Mansaku).

=== The Fangires ===
The Fangire Race (ファンガイア族, Fangaia Zoku) are vampiric creatures that resemble stained glass, originally feeding off of the Life Energy (ライフエナジー, Raifu Enajī) of humans until they are commanded by their king to coexist with them. However, some of these Fangires are unable to follow this law due to their instincts. Each Fangire belongs to a specific class based on the animal form it takes. Several Fangires also appear in the first episode when Natsumi is trapped within the changing dimensions. They include the Shark, Moose, Horsefly, Rat, Mantis, and Seamoon Fangires. The Mantis Fangire later appears fighting the Beetle Fangire.

- Swallowtail Fangire (スワローテイルファンガイア, Suwarōteiru Fangaia): A Fangire with the title of Bishop (ビショップ, Bishoppu), his task is to oversee the progress of all Fangires and their moral conduct, deeming those who are traitors to their king's laws. When the Beetle Fangire regains his title, the Swallowtail Fangire aides his master until he is shattered by Decade's Dimension Slash. The Swallowtail Fangire is voiced by Tomohiro Tsuboi (坪井 智浩, Tsuboi Tomohiro).
- Lion Fangire (ライオンファンガイア, Raion Fangaia): A Fangire with the title of Rook (ルーク, Rūku), he is chasing after a renegade Fangire when Tsukasa interferes and destroys him with the Ride Booker's Decade Slash. The Lion Fangire is voiced by Toshitsugu Takashina (高階 俊嗣, Takashina Toshitsugu).

== World of Ryuki ==
The World of Ryuki (龍騎の世界, Ryūki no Sekai) is the version of reality where Kamen Rider Ryuki takes place. In this world, there exists the Kamen Rider Trial (仮面ライダー裁判, Kamen Raidā Saiban), a battle where the Kamen Riders fight each other within a parallel dimension known as the Mirror World (ミラーワールド, Mirā Wārudo) alongside their Contract Monsters (契約モンスター, Keiyaku Monsutā) for the victor to decide the fate of a defendant in a criminal case. Though no harm occurs to the Rider while in the Mirror World, a battle in the real world can be fatal and use of Vent cards outside a battle is forbidden. The backdrop used to arrive in this world shows Dragredder flying within the Mirror World as shown in a mirrored time display screen on a skyscraper. Within this A.R. World, Tsukasa assumes the identity of a lawyer and has the ability to enter the Mirror World without a Card Deck.

=== Shinji Tatsumi ===
Shinji Tatsumi (辰巳 シンジ, Tatsumi Shinji) is a young cameraman who works for the Atashi Journal, a popular magazine that covers the Kamen Riders and the trials. When the editor of the journal is murdered, Shinji becomes a Kamen Rider to decide the fate of the suspect. Like his namesake in Ryuki, Shinji has the ability to transform into Kamen Rider Ryuki (仮面ライダー龍騎, Kamen Raidā Ryūki) and use the power of his Contract Monster Dragredder. He later appears in Kamen Rider × Kamen Rider W & Decade: Movie War 2010 alongside the other Riders of the Nine Worlds to help in reviving Tsukasa and helps him battle Super Shocker, assuming Ryuki Survive with the help of Decade's K-Touch and later into his Ryuki Dragredder form with the All Rider Final Form Ride Card to fight the Super Crisis Fortress.

Shinji Tatsumi is portrayed by Momosuke Mizutani (水谷 百輔, Mizutani Momosuke).

=== Ren Haguro ===
Ren Haguro (羽黒 レン, Haguro Ren) is a former journalist of the Atashi Journal and Shinji's former best friend, mysteriously leaving the group three years ago without explanation. Like his namesake in Ryuki, Ren has the ability to transform into Kamen Rider Knight (仮面ライダーナイト, Kamen Raidā Naito) and use the power of his Contract Monster Darkwing. When Reiko is murdered, Ren enters the Trial to find the Rider who possesses the Time Vent Card. After defeating Scissors, Ren encounters Decade in a brief confrontation before Zolda intervenes. Later while forced to fight Shinji who accuses him of playing a part in Reiko's death, Decade's fight with Imperer stops theirs. Soon after, Decade battles Knight with the former being the superior fighter until Abyss intervenes. After founding and defeating Odin, Ren acquires the Time Vent card at the cost of being too injured to use it himself, shortly when Abyss is revealed to be Reiko's murderer, with Shinji takes Ren's place, accompanied by Tsukasa to prevent Reiko's death from the hands of Kamata.

Ren Haguro is portrayed by Eiki Kitamura (北村 栄基, Kitamura Eiki).

=== Reiko Momoi ===
Reiko Momoi (桃井 玲子, Momoi Reiko) is the editor of the Atashi Journal who is mysteriously murdered when Natsumi finds her upon arriving in the World of Ryuki, with the Natsumi as the sole suspect of her murder. But Ryuki uses the Time Vent Card to alter time and prevent Reiko's death while exposing the murderer to be Kamata.

Reiko Momoi is portrayed by Sae Takahashi (高橋 佐衣, Takahashi Sae).

=== Other Kamen Riders ===
Other than the brief appearances of Kamen Rider Raia (仮面ライダーライア, Kamen Raidā Raia), Kamen Rider Gai (仮面ライダーガイ, Kamen Raidā Gai), and Kamen Rider Femme (仮面ライダーファム, Kamen Raidā Famu) (which are summoned by Diend in the Worlds of Decade in All Riders vs. Dai-Shocker – the former two – and Black, respectively), the following Riders are seen in the Battle Trial for the murder of Reiko Momoi.

- Kamen Rider Scissors (仮面ライダーシザース, Kamen Raidā Shizāsu): Scissors is a cheating Rider who uses the power of his Contract Monster Volcancer. He is labeled by the Journal to have a victory rate of 6.8%. He is removed from the trial by Knight. Kamen Rider Scissors is voiced by Yasunori Masutani (増谷 康紀, Masutani Yasunori).
- Kamen Rider Zolda (仮面ライダーゾルダ, Kamen Raidā Zoruda): A public prosecutor who sees Natsumi guilty. Zolda is a Rider who uses the power of his Contract Monster Magnugiga.
- Kamen Rider Verde (仮面ライダーベルデ, Kamen Raidā Berude): Verde is a Rider who uses the power of his Contract Monster Biogreeza. He lowers his guard when falling for Scissors' trap and is removed from the trial by Volcancer who destroys Verde's Advent Deck.
- Kamen Rider Tiger (仮面ライダータイガ, Kamen Raidā Taiga): Tiger is a Rider who uses the power of his Contract Monster Destwilder. He is removed from the trial by Zolda's Giga Launcher.
- Kamen Rider Imperer (仮面ライダーインペラー, Kamen Raidā Inperā): Impaler is a Rider who uses the power of his Contract Monsters Gigazelle, Megazelle, Omegazelle, Negazelle, and Magazelle. He is removed from the trial by Decade's Final Attack Ride.
- Kamen Rider Odin (仮面ライダーオーディン, Kamen Raidā Ōdin): Odin is a Rider who uses the power of his Contract Monster Goldphoenix. He lets himself be removed from the trial by Knight's Final Vent allowing Knight to take the Time Vent Card.

=== Mirror Monsters ===
The Mirror Monsters (ミラーモンスター, Mirā Monsutā) are a race of monsters that reside in the Mirror World. They often come into contact with the Kamen Riders of this reality. In the first episode, various Hydragoons are involved in the all-out battle among the monster groups that destroys the world.

- GuldThunder (ガルドサンダー, Garudosandā): A red Fenghuang monster in a Phoenix-shaped helmet. It is shown briefly fighting Kamen Rider Ryuki alongside Omegazelle and Zebraskull Bronze.
- Zebraskull Bronze (ゼブラスカル・ブロンズ, Zeburasukaru Buronzu): A black-headed zebra monster. It is shown briefly fighting Kamen Rider Ryuki alongside GuldThunder and Omegazelle.
- Megazelle (メガゼール, Megazēru): A blue and yellow gazelle monster that often appears when Kamen Rider Impaler summons it.
- Negazelle (ネガゼール, Negazēru): A gazelle/cape buffalo monster that often appears when Kamen Rider Impaler summons it.
- Omegazelle (オメガゼール, Omegazēru): A gazelle/Water Buffalo monster that often appear when Kamen Rider Impaler summons it. One is briefly seen fighting Kamen Rider Ryuki alongside GuldThunder and Zebraskull Bronze.
- Magazelle (マガゼール, Magazēru): A bighorn sheep/gazelle monster that often appears when Kamen Rider Impaler summons it.

==== Contract Monsters ====
The Contract Monsters (契約モンスター, Keiyaku Monsutā) are specific Mirror Monsters that are contracted to the Riders in this world. The following have made appearances in this show:

- Darkwing (ダークウイング, Dākuuingu): A giant mechanical vampire bat-like Contract Monster under Kamen Rider Knight.
- Volcancer (ボルキャンサー, Borukyansā): A mechanical humanoid crab-like Contract Monster under Kamen Rider Scissors.
- Destwilder (デストワイルダー, Desutowairudā): An armored humanoid white tiger monster that is Kamen Rider Tiger's Contract Monster.
- Gigazelle (ギガゼール, Gigazēru): A humanoid gazelle monster that is Kamen Rider Impaler's Contract Monster. It is often supported by the other Zelles.
- Abysshammer (アビスハンマー, Abisuhanmā): A hammerhead shark monster with machine guns and missile launchers that is one of Kamen Rider Abyss' two Contract Monsters. Kamen Rider Abyss' Final Vent enables Abysshammer and Abysslasher to combine into a giant shark called Abyssodon (アビソドン, Abisodon) which is when it is destroyed by Decade and Ryuki Dragreder.
- Abysslasher (アビスラッシャー, Abisurasshā): A shark monster with two saw-like swords and water-spewing abilities that is one of Kamen Rider Abyss' two Contract Monsters. Kamen Rider Abyss' Final Vent enables Abysshammer and Abysslasher to combine into a giant shark called Abyssodon which is when it is destroyed by Decade and Ryuki Dragreder.

== World of Blade ==
The World of Blade (ブレイドの世界, Bureido no Sekai) is the version of reality where Kamen Rider Blade takes place. In this world, the Riders are high rank employees of the BOARD Corporation (株式会社BOARD, Kabushikigaisha Bōdo), and are effectively "Kamen Rider Salarymen" (仮面ライダーサラリーマン, Kamen Raidā Sararīman), whose job it is to combat the Undead once receiving clearance to use Rouzers. In BOARD, there is a ranking system with Ace (エース, Ēsu) at the top followed by King (キング, Kingu), Queen (クイーン, Kuīn), Jack (ジャック, Jakku), and the numbers with Two at the bottom. The backdrop used to arrive in this world shows a hand of facedown Rouse cards with the Ace of spades (Blade's Change Beetle) face up. Within this A.R. World, Tsukasa assumes the role of chief waiter within BOARD and is given the ability to completely destroy Undead without sealing them.

=== Kazuma Kendate ===
Kazuma Kendate (剣立 カズマ, Kendate Kazuma) is a Rank Ace employee of BOARD who has the ability to transform into Kamen Rider Blade (仮面ライダーブレイド, Kamen Raidā Bureido) with the sealed Beetle Undead. However, due to his ranking, Kazuma is prideful to the point of seeing himself to be invincible. It is not until after he gets demoted while Tsukasa arrives that he realizes that ranking is not everything and that followers are just as important as leaders. Soon after helping him with the crisis occurring in his world, Kazuma thanks Tsukasa who is confident that he would look after the Ace Lunch. He later assigns himself as a president of the BOARD Corporation after Hajime/Chalice's defeat. He sometimes calls Tsukasa "cheese", rather than "chief", though it is not known if this is made purposefully or not.

Kazuma later appears in the World of the Rider War as his reality is absorbed into it, leading his Rider comrades and the Undead against Wataru's allies and the Fangire. Though at first he refuses to aid Tsukasa and Yusuke, Kazuma has a change of heart and joins in the fight against Super Apollo Geist with Kamen Rider Garren before the villain causes more worlds to merge into the World of the Rider War, destroying the World of Blade which causes its Riders to fade away as a result. However, he is resurrected following Tsukasa's death in Kamen Rider × Kamen Rider W & Decade: Movie War 2010 and helps in reviving him and battles Super Shocker, assuming King Form as a result from Decade's K-Touch and later transforms into his Jack Form to fight the Super Crisis Fortress.

Kazuma Kendate is portrayed by Hiroki Suzuki (鈴木 拡樹, Suzuki Hiroki).

=== Sakuya Hishigata ===
Sakuya Hishigata (菱形 サクヤ, Hishigata Sakuya) is a Rank Ace senior employee of BOARD who has the ability to transform into Kamen Rider Garren (仮面ライダーギャレン, Kamen Raidā Gyaren) with the sealed Stag Undead. After Kazuma's demotion, he starts treating him badly until he himself got demoted after losing his Rider System to Chalice. He dies along with Kuroba after his life energy is absorbed by Hajime to create the Joker card.

A second Garren later appears in the World of the Rider War. This Garren eventually disintegrates together with Kazuma in the aftermath of Apollo Geist's merging of the Rider Worlds.

Sakuya Hishigata is portrayed by Yoshihiko Narimatsu (成松 慶彦, Narimatsu Yoshihiko).

=== Mutsuki Kuroba ===
Mutsuki Kuroba (黒葉 ムツキ, Kuroba Mutsuki) is an employee of BOARD, originally Rank King but recently promoted to an Ace who has the ability to transform into Kamen Rider Leangle (仮面ライダーレンゲル, Kamen Raidā Rengeru) with the sealed Spider Undead. After he is promoted to Ace and Kazuma is demoted, he starts treating him badly while developing a superiority complex. Mutsuki is the last Rider to lose his Rider System along with Hishigata, learning of Chalice's true identity as he and Hishigata die after their life energy were absorbed and used by Hajime to create the Joker card.

A second Leangle later appears in the World of the Rider War. This Leangle was killed by Wataru, grief-stricken over the death of Rising Ixa. After Tsusaka's death, he, like the others killed during the Rider War, is restored to life along with the World of Blade.

Mutsuki Kuroba is portrayed by Kazuma Kawahara (川原 一馬, Kawahara Kazuma).

=== Hajime Shijo ===
Hajime Shijo (四条 ハジメ, Shijō Hajime) was the president of the BOARD Corporation who secretly uses the sealed Mantis Undead to assume the form of the legendary Kamen Rider Chalice (仮面ライダーカリス, Kamen Raidā Karisu). Because he is more interested in business ethnics, Hajime sees himself as the only thing keeping BOARD alive by offering his company's aid once paid by the government. Furthermore, he conspires with Kamata by taking the other Rider Systems to begin a joint plan to take over the world by creating the Joker card from the DNA of all four Ace Undead. Being unable to get Kazuma to give him the Blay Buckle by normal means, Chalice makes his presence known during Decade and Blade's fights against the Paradoxa Undead and the other BOARD Riders, stripping Kazuma of his Blay Buckle before fighting Decade until Todoroki's sudden appearance. But Hajime escapes with the Garren Buckle as well, later taking the Leangle Buckle with his identity exposed to Hishigata and Mutsuki whom he abducts and sacrifices to complete the Joker card. Assuming the form of the Joker (ジョーカー, Jōkā), Hajime meets his end at the hands of Blade and Decade.

Unlike the original Kamen Rider Chalice, the Chalice Rouzer that Hajime Shijo uses is a Rider System rather than bestowed upon him.

Hajime Shijo is portrayed by Ruo (累央).

=== Ai, Mai and Mi ===
Ai (アイ), Mai (マイ) and Mi (ミー, Mī) are Rank 8 employees of BOARD, serving under Tsukasa as the kitchen staff in preparing the food for the higher ups.

Rumi Hiiragi (柊 瑠美, Hiiragi Rumi), Yuka Kayama (香山 裕香, Kayama Yuka), and Ayano Washizu (鷲巣 あやの, Washizu Ayano) portray Ai, Mai, and Mi, respectively.

Their names are a pun of "I", "my", and "me", respectively.

=== Kamata ===
Kamata (鎌田) is the human form of the Category King of Hearts Undead, the Paradoxa Undead (パラドキサアンデッド, Paradokisa Andeddo), with the ability of creating a blade-like wind from his forearm to kill his target. Recruited by Narutaki, Kamata infiltrated the World of Ryuki as the sub-chief editor of the Atashi Journal while acquiring the dimension's Abyss Advent deck to become Kamen Rider Abyss (仮面ライダーアビス, Kamen Raidā Abisu) while secretly murdering Reiko Momoi. Once Kamata's true identity as an Undead is exposed along with being Reiko's murderer, her death averted when Decade used Odin's Time Vent card to go back in time, he is returned to his homeworld by Narutaki after his V-Buckle and Advent Deck were destroyed by Decade and Ryuki. Kamata later works with Hajime in a plot to take over the world as the chairman of the BOARD Corporation. After helping Hajime steal the three other Rider Systems, Kamata helps him create the Joker Rouse Card. He is later defeated alongside the Joker by Decade and Blade.

As Kamen Rider Abyss, Kamata uses the Contract Monsters Abysslasher (アビスラッシャー, Abisurasshā) and Abysshammer (アビスハンマー, Abisuhanmā), which he can combine into the giant shark Abyssodon (アビソドン, Abisodon) which has a chainsaw attachment (giving it the appearance of a sawshark when in use) and machine gun eyes (giving it the appearance of a hammerhead shark when in use).

Kamata is portrayed by Masato Irie (入江 雅人, Irie Masato). In the music video for "Journey through the Decade", his Paradoxa Undead form is summoned by Gackt to fight Tsukasa.

=== Undead ===
The Undead (アンデッド, Andeddo) are a race of monsters that are accidentally released from their seals and go on a rampage. Among them, there are several specialized Undead: Category Aces, the Royal Club, and the Joker. Several Undead also appear in the first episode when Natsumi is trapped within the changing dimensions. They include the Lizard, Pecker, Squid, and Caucasus Undead.

- Buffalo Undead (バッファローアンデッド, Baffarō Andeddo): The Category Eight of Spades Undead, he terrorizes humans until Kazuma and Hishigata confront him before receiving clearance to transform into Blade and Garren. In the end, the Buffalo Undead is defeated by Blade's Lightning Blast before being sealed into the Magnet Buffalo card.
- Elephant Undead (エレファントアンデッド, Erefanto Andeddo): The Category Jack of Clubs Undead, he is destroyed by Decade using Ryuki's Strike Vent.
- Capricorn Undead (カプリコーンアンデッド, Kapurikōn Andeddo): The Category Queen of Spades Undead, he aids the Paradoxa Undead until he is destroyed by Decade's Dimensional Kick.

== World of Faiz ==
The World of Faiz (ファイズの世界, Faizu no Sekai) is the version of reality where Kamen Rider 555 takes place. In this world, students of the Smart Brain High School (スマートブレイン･ハイスクール, Smāto Burēn Hai Sukūru) are being attacked nightly by monsters known as the Orphnoch. The backdrop used to enter the World of Faiz is a splitscreen featuring the Autovajin in Battle Mode and blue butterflies, referencing Smart Lady, a character from the original series who was Smart Brain Corporation's mascot of sorts. Within this A.R. World, Tsukasa assumes the role of a Smart Brain High student and is able to surpass the talent and intelligence of all of Lucky Clover, such as skills in tennis. Daiki's treasure in this world is the Faiz Driver, but eventually he relents and takes the unused Orga Driver instead.

=== Takumi Ogami ===
Takumi Ogami (尾上 タクミ, Ogami Takumi) is a hot-blooded boy who protects Smart Brain High from the Orphnoch, though his reason for doing this is a mystery. Like his namesake in 555, Takumi uses the Faiz Gear to become Kamen Rider Faiz (仮面ライダーファイズ, Kamen Raidā Faizu) along with assuming the form of the Wolf Orphnoch (ウルフオルフェノク, Urufu Orufenoku), both of which were aspects of his namesake Takumi Inui in 555. While he does not appear to help in reviving Tsukasa in Kamen Rider × Kamen Rider W & Decade: Movie War 2010 he still appears to help him battle Super Shocker, assuming Blaster Form with the help of Decade's K-Touch and later uses the Jet Sliger to fight the Super Crisis Fortress.

Takumi Ogami is portrayed by Syunsuke Seino (制野 峻右, Seino Shunsuke). In Kamen Rider × Kamen Rider W & Decade: Movie War 2010, Faiz is voiced by Kenji Akabane (赤羽根 健治, Akabane Kenji).

=== Yuri Tomoda ===
Yuri Tomoda (友田 由里, Tomoda Yuri) is one of Takumi's fellow students, a member of Smart Brain High's photography club with a dream to create the perfect photo journal. She is not as good-willed as she initially appears, expressing being prejudiced to the Orphnoch as well as believing Faiz to be an urban legend. However, when targeted by the Lucky Clover members, Yuri learns of Takumi's true nature. The situation leaves her confused until she sees Takumi attempt to protect her camera, hearing his reason for becoming Faiz. After the fight, Yuri convinces Takumi to keep protecting Smart Brain High to protect her dream.

Yuri Tomoda is portrayed by Yurie Midori (緑 友利恵, Midori Yurie).

=== Momose ===
Momose (百瀬) is a student of Smart Brain High who is a member of Lucky Clover (ラッキークローバー, Rakkī Kurōbā): a group of top-ranked students who are actually Orphnoch. Momose's true form is that of the Tiger Orphnoch (タイガーオルフェノク, Taigā Orufenoku), possessing the power to revive Orphnochs on the verge of death. After learning the truth behind Faiz, Momose decides to take over the school and sire new Orphnoch from the student body. However, the Riders intervene and the Tiger Orphnoch is destroyed by Decade's Decade Photon.

Momose is portrayed by Ryosuke Miura (三浦 涼介, Miura Ryōsuke).

=== Orphnoch ===
The Orphnoch (オルフェノク, Orufenoku) are humans who have entered the next stage in evolution, possessing heighten physical and other various special abilities. Several Orphnoch appear in the first episode where Decade assumes Faiz's form to fight them off. They include the Octopus, Okra, Pigeon, Dolphin and Rhinoceros Beetle Orphnoch.

- Butterfly Orphnoch (バタフライオルフェノク, Batafurai Orufenoku): Unable to become a student at Smart Brain High, she attacks a security officer until Faiz arrives and destroys her with his Sparkle Cut attack. The Butterfly Orphnoch is portrayed by Riho Okada (岡田 里穂, Okada Riho).
- Shukawa/Lobster Orphnoch (朱川／ロブスターオルフェノク, Shukawa/Robusutā Orufenoku): The only female member of Lucky Clover. Though she is resurrected by the Tiger Orphnoch, she meets her end against Decade's Decade Photon. Shukawa is portrayed by Ayasa Hanagata (花形 綾沙, Hanagata Ayasa).
- Genda/Dragon Orphnoch (玄田／ドラゴンオルフェノク, Genda/Doragon Orufenoku): A jock member of Lucky Clover who is destroyed by Decade as Blade until the Tiger Orphnoch arrives and resurrects him into his muscular Majin Form. He is destroyed for good by Decade's Decade Photon. Genda is portrayed by CHIKARA.
- Shirogane/Centipede Orphnoch (城金／センチピードオルフェノク, Shirogane/Senchipīdo Orufenoku): A booksmart member of Lucky Clover who is destroyed by Diend's Dimension Shot while attempting to steal the Faiz Driver. Shirogane is portrayed by Takuya Nagaoka (永岡 卓也, Nagaoka Takuya).

== World of Agito ==
The World of Agito (アギトの世界, Agito no Sekai) is the version of reality where Kamen Rider Agito takes place. Similar to the World of Kuuga, the Riders and the police battle the Gurongi. However, a new evil surfaces onto the world, monsters that they refer to as the Unknown. The backdrop used to enter the World of Agito is the elaborate tapestry seen in the opening sequence of Agito that depicts the story of Agito and the Unknown. This story arc further expands on the war between the Unknown and the Gurongi, which is hinted in both their respective series and explained more outside them. Within this A.R. World, Tsukasa assumes the role of a mailman with Toko's letter on his person. Due to the similarities to the World of Kuuga, Tsukasa more or less possesses the same talents in this world, as well as knowledge of the Unknown and the Agito Seed. Daiki's treasure in this world is the G4 Chip, but it's eventually destroyed by Toko.

=== Shoichi Ashikawa ===
Shoichi Ashikawa (芦河 ショウイチ, Ashikawa Shōichi (Note: Shoichi Ashikawa (芦河 ショウイチ, Ashikawa Shōichi) is a composite of the three main characters in the Kamen Rider Agito series, with his name being a portmanteau of all three characters' names: Shoichi Tsugami (津上 翔一, Tsugami Shōichi) (Agito), Ryo Ashihara (葦原 涼, Ashihara Ryō) (Gills), and Makoto Hikawa (氷川 誠, Hikawa Makoto) (G3).)) is a young man who supports the police, originally the user of the G3 system until he mysteriously disappeared. In reality, Shoichi left because he began to transform into Kamen Rider Exceed Gills (仮面ライダーエクシードギルス, Kamen Raidā Ekushīdo Girusu), a partially evolved creature that is targeted by the Unknown. By the time the Unknown begin their attack, with Yusuke's help, Shoichi completes his metamorphosis into the evolutionary Kamen Rider Agito (仮面ライダーアギト, Kamen Raidā Agito). While his world vanishes along with the others, he is revived after Decade's death and helps revive Decade. He later appears to help in the final battle with Super Shocker, transforming into Shining Form as a result of Decade's K-Touch and later into his Agito Tornador form with the All Rider Final Form Ride Card to fight the Super Crisis Fortress.

Shoichi Ashikawa is portrayed by So Yamanaka (山中 聡, Yamanaka Sō).

=== Toko Yashiro ===
Toko Yashiro (八代 淘子, Yashiro Tōko), resembling Ai Yashiro of the World of Kuuga, is a scientist and the creator of the G-Series of Kamen Riders. Compared to Ai, Toko is more high-strung and sees the G3-X Suit as humanity's only hope. Toko also has some feelings towards Shoichi as Ai had for Yusuke, which was her motivation for building the G3-X suit. She monitors the condition of the operator and the G3 suit during combat from the G-Trailer mobile command base.

Hiroko Sato returns to Decade to portray Toko Yashiro in the World of Agito arc.

=== Taurus Ballista ===
Taurus Ballista (タウルス・バリスタ, Taurusu Barisuta), the Buffalo Lord (バッファローロード, Baffarō Rōdo), is one of the stronger Lords who wields the Supremacy Torreana (至高のトリアンナ, Shikō no Torianna). Ballista embodies the Lords' purpose, which is to purge the world of any above average human, for the own good of humanity. However, Tsukasa tells him that they do not need someone to protect and limit humans and the Lord is destroyed by the teamwork of Decade, Agito, and Yusuke in the G3-X armor.

Taurus Ballista is voiced by Kōsuke Toriumi (鳥海 浩輔, Toriumi Kōsuke).

=== Lords ===
The Lords (ロード, Rōdo) are a group of powerful animal-headed disciples with a wing-shaped protuberance sticking out of their shoulders. They are referred by the police department as the Unknown (アンノウン, Annōn) and target any humans with abilities above normal or any threat to humanity, deeming themselves as humanity's holy protectors.

- Formica Pedes (フォルミカ・ペデス, Forumika Pedesu): Ant Lord (アントロード, Anto Rōdo) soldiers who serve Taurus Ballista and their queen Formica Regia.
- Formica Regia (フォルミカ・レギア, Forumika Regia): The Queen ant Lord and Ballista's right hand, aiding him until she dies taking Agito's Rider Kick which is meant for her master. Formica Regia is voiced by Natsuki Mori (森 夏姫, Mori Natsuki).

=== Gurongi ===
Though the World of Agito has its own members of the Gurongi Tribe (グロンギ族, Gurongi-zoku), they are practically replaced by the surfacing of the Lords.

- Me·Vagis·Ba (メ・バヂス・バ, Me Bajisu Ba): A bee monster that is labeled Unidentified Life Form #47 (未確認生命体四十七号, Mikakunin Seimeitai Yonjūnanagō). This Me Group member battles the police until he is blasted to bits by G3-X's Cerberus.
- Xu·Mevio·Da (ズ・メビオ・ダ, Zu Mebio Da): A leopard monster that is labeled Unidentified Life Form #48 (未確認生命体四十八号, Mikakunin Seimeitai Yonjūhachigō). She is a member of the Xu Group that appears in the World of Agito. She is murdered by two Ant Lords as she attempts to escape from Diend.
- Me·Ginoga·De (メ・ギノガ・デ, Me Ginoga De): A mushroom monster that is labeled Unidentified Life Form #49 (未確認生命体四十九号, Mikakunin Seimeitai Yonjūkyūgō). He appears in the World of Agito. He is destroyed by the teamwork of Diend and the summoned Drake and Delta.

== World of Den-O ==
The World of Den-O (電王の世界, Den'ō no Sekai) is the version of reality in which Kamen Rider Den-O takes place. Unlike the other Riders Worlds, the World of Den-O is almost identical to the setting of the original series. The only difference is the interior of the DenLiner having changed to that of the New DenLiner. The backdrop used to enter this world depicts the DenLiner moving across the sands of time, which Ryutaros doodles on later in the episode arc. Within this A.R. World, Tsukasa finds himself wearing a trenchcoat and bucket hat, the same clothing as the Past Man and given abilities similar to those of a Singularity Point. Daiki's treasure in this world is the DenLiner. The World of Den-O arc coincides with the theatrical release of Cho Kamen Rider Den-O & Decade Neo Generations: The Onigashima Warship, which takes place within the continuity of Decade like Kamen Rider Den-O: I'm Born! did with Den-O. And later Daiki returns to the World of Den-O to settle things with Reiji Kurosaki who transforms into Kamen Rider G Den-O in Episode Yellow: Treasure de End Pirates, part of Kamen Rider × Kamen Rider × Kamen Rider The Movie: Cho-Den-O Trilogy. His treasures are the pistol heirloom from the Kurosaki family and the Diend K-Touch which transforms him into a Complete Form.

=== Momotaros ===
Momotaros (モモタロス, Momotarosu) is a hot-blooded oni-themed Imagin among the DenLiner gang who uses a sword named the Momotarosword (モモタロスォード, Momotaroswōdo). Due to the actions of the Oni Brothers in the past, Momotaros loses his sense of self and is unable to retain his physical form outside the DenLiner, forcing him to use Tsukasa and Yusuke as host bodies to fight the Mole Imagin as Kamen Rider Den-O Sword Form. Momotaros, while possessing Yusuke, is attacked by Diend who wishes to turn him into the DenLiner. Together with Tsukasa, Momotaros regains his true form and they destroy the Alligator Imagin, the force behind the Mole Imagin attacks who he believed caused the crisis. But once Momotaros returns to the DenLiner and is reunited with Ryotaro and Kotaro, he learns the Oni Brothers are behind the distortions in their world, just as he disappears, finding himself on Onigashima as part of the Oni Conquest legend. Whenever Momotaros possesses someone, the person starts wearing a red scarf and has his/her hair spiked upwards, returning to normal when Momotaros leaves the body. He later helps Tsukasa in Kamen Rider Decade: All Riders vs. Dai-Shocker by assuming his Tarōs form with the Momotaros Final Form Ride Card and using the Kiva Arrow to assist Decade and Diend in defeating Ikadevil and his minions and in Kamen Rider × Kamen Rider W & Decade: Movie War 2010 where he assumes his Super Climax Form with the help of Decade's K-Touch and later uses the DenLiner to fight the Super Crisis Fortress.

Toshihiko Seki (関 俊彦, Seki Toshihiko) reprises his role voicing Momotaros.

=== Taros ===
Along with Momotaros, the smooth-talking sea turtle-themed Urataros (ウラタロス, Uratarosu), the noble bear-themed Kintaros (キンタロス, Kintarosu), and the childish dragon-themed Ryutaros (リュウタロス, Ryūtarosu), collectively known as the Taros (タロス, Tarosu), provide Den-O the ability to become Rod, Axe, and Gun Forms respectively. For an unknown reason, the Tarōs have lost the ability to exist outside of time and in normal space, but they can now possess anyone at will to transform into Den-O. Urataros, Kintaros, and Ryutaros all possess Tsukasa, before possessing Natsumi and using her body to transform into Den-O to fight Decade, believing he's to blame for what is occurring. After Kohana disciplines the three from jumping to conclusions and using Natsumi's body, the three remained on the DenLiner. Once Momotaros returns to the DenLiner and is reunited with Ryotaro and Kotaro. Kotaro mentions the Oni Brothers being behind the distortions in their world, just as three Tarōs disappear with Momotaros, finding themselves in 1930, where they hid by possessing the original Arms Monsters of Kamen Rider Kiva and became rice thieves. Rescued by the DenLiner crew, they join the battle on Onigashima where they possess the summoned Kamen Riders G3, Caucasus, & Ohja. Like Momotaros, the Tarōs also change the appearance of any person they possess: Urataros dresses them in a suave way (Tsukasa, for example, wears a white tuxedo and top hat under his possession), Kintaros gives them a feudal Japan-era look, and Ryutaros gives an 80s' hip hop style to the person, making him/her able to breakdance.

Kōji Yusa (遊佐 浩二, Yusa Kōji), Masaki Terasoma (てらそま まさき, Terasoma Masaki), and Kenichi Suzumura (鈴村 健一, Suzumura Ken'ichi) reprise their roles voicing Urataros, Kintaros, and Ryutaros respectively.

=== Sieg ===
Sieg (ジーク, Jīku) is a swan-themed Imagin with an ego who occasionally aids the DenLiner gang, providing Den-O the ability to become Wing Form. Though the crisis of the World of Den-O is seemingly solved, Sieg appears in the Hikari Studio in the World of Kabuto in the possession of a manuscript of the Onigashima Conquest legend.

Shin-ichiro Miki (三木 眞一郎, Miki Shin'ichirō) reprises his role voicing Sieg.

=== Kohana ===
Kohana (コハナ) is a little girl who lives on the DenLiner, her timeline having been erased from existence due to the Imagin going into the past. She can only exist because she is a Singularity Point, and not tied to the changes of time. She is the daughter of Yuto Sakurai and Airi Nogami, and the niece of Ryotaro Nogami.

Tamaki Matsumoto (松元 環季, Matsumoto Tamaki) reprises her role as Kohana.

=== Naomi ===
Naomi (ナオミ) is the waitress of the DenLiner, known for her coffee that no Imagin can resist.

Rina Akiyama (秋山 莉奈, Akiyama Rina) reprises her role as Naomi.

=== Owner ===
The Owner (オーナー, Ōnā) of the DenLiner is a mysterious man with a habit of speaking in complexes when it comes to the nature of time. Owner enjoys eating various dishes that have a flag placed in the middle of them, aiming to eat his entire meal (usually rice or flan) without knocking the flags over.

Kenjirō Ishimaru (石丸 謙二郎, Ishimaru Kenjirō) reprises his role as the Owner.

=== Kotaro Nogami ===
Kotaro Nogami (野上 幸太郎, Nogami Kōtarō) is a young man from the future who can transform into Kamen Rider New Den-O (仮面ライダーNEW電王, Kamen Raidā Nyū Den'ō). He is the grandson of the original Kamen Rider Den-O Ryotaro Nogami.

Dori Sakurada (桜田 通, Sakurada Dori) reprises his role as Kotaro Nogami from Saraba Kamen Rider Den-O: Final Countdown.

=== Ryotaro Nogami ===
Ryotaro Nogami (野上 良太郎, Nogami Ryōtarō) is the original Kamen Rider Den-O (仮面ライダー電王, Kamen Raidā Den'ō). During Decade's time in his world, Ryotaro was researching the time distortions with Deneb and Kotaro, and is subsequently affected by them, causing him to regress to a younger age. While he does not fight in the present day, he allows the Imagin to come together and form Kamen Rider Den-O Super Climax Form in the fight on Onigashima.

Takuya Mizoguchi (溝口 琢矢, Mizoguchi Takuya) reprises his role as the younger Ryotaro Nogami from the film Kamen Rider Den-O: I'm Born!.

=== Shilubara ===
One of the two Oni Brothers of Onigashima, Shilubara (シルバラ, Shirubara) wields the Silvery Kanabō (純銀の金棒, Jungin no Kanabō) as his weapon. He briefly appears during Den-O Ax Form's fight with Decade to acquire a vase for his brother Kuchihiko's agenda. Though ignored at the time, it would later turn out he is one of the true culprits behind the chaos in the World of Den-O.

=== Gelnewts ===
Gelnewts (ゲルニュート, Gerunyūto) are newt Mirror Monsters that serve as the Oni Brothers' foot soldiers. They wield giant shurikens that are mounted on their backs when not in use. They accompanied Mimihiko in acquiring the vase for their masters' agenda.

=== Alligator Imagin ===
The Alligator Imagin (アリゲーターイマジン, Arigētā Imajin), based on the story of The Fox and the Crocodile (キツネとワニ, Kitsune to Wani), is an Imagin who enacts his own scheme to change the past. Unlike other Imagin, the Alligator Imagin goes through a multitude of hosts to enact his scheme. Arriving in the past on 30 December 2008 via a child, the Alligator Imagin proceeds to change the future and overpowers Decade and Den-O, taking the latter's DenGasher as his own. Diend and his KamenRide Card summoned Riotroopers allow for Den-O and Decade to regroup, and allow for Decade to get the Den-O Cards. With both Kuuga and Den-O, Decade destroys the Alligator Imagin with the Den-O Final Attack Ride.

The Alligator Imagin is voiced by Kenta Miyake (三宅 健太, Miyake Kenta).

=== Imagin ===
The Imagin (イマジン, Imajin) are the creatures that arrive from the future to alter the past with only a handful standing against them. Several Imagin appear in the first episode when Natsumi is trapped in shifting dimensions attempting to get her to tell them her wish. These include the Spider, Bat, Molech, Bloodsucker, and Whale Imagin.

- New Mole Imagin (NEWモールイマジン, Nyū Mōru Imajin): The Alligator Imagin's Imagin minions who appear throughout the World of Den-O. One is destroyed by Tsukasa as Den-O Sword Form. A few appear during Decade's fight with the other three forms of Den-O while Shilubara and his minions steal a vase.

== World of Kabuto ==
The World of Kabuto (カブトの世界, Kabuto no Sekai) is the version of reality where Kamen Rider Kabuto takes place. The backdrop used to enter this world depicts Tokyo Tower with an arm outstretched in homage to Souji Tendou's "walking the path to heaven" pose. Within this A.R. World, Tsukasa assumes the role of a ZECTrooper and given the ability to see in Clock Up space. Daiki's treasure in this world is the Clock Up System.

=== Souji ===
Souji (ソウジ, Sōji) is a young man who has been given access to ZECT's technology, using the Kabuto Zecter to transform into Kamen Rider Kabuto (仮面ライダーカブト, Kamen Raidā Kabuto). However, Kabuto's Clock Up System malfunctions, prompting ZECT to deem him a threat. Despite this though, he continues protecting his sister. Eventually, ZECT is able to capture Kabuto and finally initiate their plans for world conquest. However, thanks to the combined efforts of both Decade and Kabuto, the true threat is finally defeated. He later appears to help revive Tsukasa in Kamen Rider × Kamen Rider W & Decade: Movie War 2010 and battles Super Shocker, assuming Hyper Form as a result of Decade's K-Touch and later into his Zecter Kabuto form with the All Rider Final Form Ride Card to fight the Super Crisis Fortress.

Souji is portrayed by Daijiro Kawaoka (川岡 大次郎, Kawaoka Daijirō)

=== Arata ===
Arata (アラタ) is an agent of ZECT under Otogiri who uses the Gatack Zecter to transform into Kamen Rider Gatack (仮面ライダーガタック, Kamen Raidā Gatakku). He is the only member of Otogiri's group to support Kabuto, and attempts to defend him. But when he sees Otogiri with Mayu, he attempts to reason with him before he is attacked by ZECTroopers, escaping them to call Tsukasa and the others for help as he learns that he and ZECT are being played by Otogiri.

Arata is portrayed by Tetsuya Makita (牧田 哲也, Makita Tetsuya).

=== Grandma ===
The elderly woman known only as Grandma (おばあちゃん, Obaachan) is very tenacious and gives out advice to her granddaughter Mayu, despite her grandson having disappeared. Following monk-like philosophies of peace and spouting amazingly appropriate zen-like phrases, she runs the Tendouya (天堂屋, Tendōya; Heaven House) oden restaurant. It is later revealed that she is aware of her granddaughter being a Worm during her conversation with Tsukasa, and her grandson being Kabuto as she expresses her worries when ZECT finishes building the Clock Down system.

Grandma is portrayed by Sumie Sasaki (佐々木 すみ江, Sasaki Sumie).

=== Mayu ===
Mayu (マユ) is the granddaughter of Grandma with a grudge against Kabuto for what she thought was brother's murder, only to later learn her 'brother' was actually a Worm. She is eventually revealed to be the Sisyra Worm (シシーラワーム, Shishīra Wāmu), targeted by the other Worms because of her ties to Kabuto.

Mayu is portrayed by Rio Kanno (菅野 莉央, Kanno Rio).

=== Phylloxera Worm ===
The Phylloxera Worm (フィロキセラワーム, Firokisera Wāmu) is a Worm that assumed the form of Souji before losing his eye to him as Kabuto, he assumed the alias of Sou Otogiri (弟切 ソウ, Otogiri Sō), becoming head agent of ZECT and user of TheBee Zecter to transform into Kamen Rider TheBee (仮面ライダーザビー, Kamen Raidā Zabī) to get his revenge on Souji. The fact that he resembled Souji had Mayu confuse him to be her brother before he reveals his true form while carrying out the Kabuto Capture Plan to get his revenge while ensuring that the Worms gain the advantage over the ZECT Riders. He is destroyed by Kabuto's & Decade's Rider Kick as they tear down the Clock Down broadcast tower in the process.

The Phylloxera Worm originally appeared in the SmaSTATION special Kamen Rider G in which Decade and the other Heisei Kamen Riders make a cameo appearance at the end.

The Phylloxera Worm is voiced by Kenichi Mochizuki (望月 健一, Mochizuki Ken'ichi), while his human guise of Sou Otogiri is portrayed by Daijiro Kawaoka, who also portrayed Souji.

=== Worms ===
The Worms (ワーム, Wāmu) are an alien menace that blends into the human population by copying the faces of their victims along with their memories and personalities. While most are in pupa form known as a Salis, few Worms molt into an adult form with the ability to Clock Up. During the events of the first episode, a Culex Worm mimics Natsumi as it and its group, composed of the Geophilid, Sectio, and Sepultura Worms, attempt to kill her until Tsukasa becomes Decade for the first time.

- Coleoptera Worm Argentum (コレプテラワーム・アージェンタム, Koreoputera Wāmu Ājentamu): A scarab-based Worm, the first of its kind Tsukasa encounters in the World of Kabuto while it assumes the form of a young man. After the ZECT Troopers confine it, Gatack and TheBee attempt to fight the Worm who overwhelms them in its Clock Up state. But with the unseen aid of Kabuto, the Worm is destroyed by TheBee's Rider Sting.
- Geophilid Worm (ジオフィリドワーム, Jiofirido Wāmu): A centipede-based Worm that targeted Mayu, it is destroyed by Decade in Kuuga's Pegasus Form.
- Subst Worm (サブストワーム, Sabusuto Wāmu): A crayfish-type Worm that posed as a young man and targeted Mayu, chasing her and Natsumi down until it is destroyed by a shockwave from Mayu's transformation into the Sisyra Worm.

== World of Hibiki ==
The World of Hibiki (響鬼の世界, Hibiki no Sekai) is the version of reality where Kamen Rider Hibiki takes place. In this world, humans train to become Oni within one of three rival schools of sound-based martial arts called Ongekidō (音撃道; "sound-beat path"), all based on different interpretations of the writings of the Grand Master (大師匠, Daishishō), the creator of Ongekidō. The masters and students of the Ongekidō styles wear traditional Japanese clothing, Tsukasa donning such attire while in the A.R. World and given the ability to use the Ongekibou. Daiki's treasures in this world are the three scrolls containing the secrets of the three schools of Ongekidō. The backdrop used to enter this world depicts a forest with a taiko drum in the foreground. Nearly all of the original cast of Hibiki returns to reprise their roles, with only Shigeki Hosokawa (the original Hibiki) and Rakuto Tochihara (the original Asumu) absent. The episodes also show calligraphic representations of the Kamen Riders' names: "Tsukasa Kadoya" (門矢士, Kadoya Tsukasa), "Photo" (写, Utsushi), "passing through" (通, Tōru), "Decade" (ディケイド, Dikeido), "Sea Cucumber" (海鼠, Namako), and Pink (桃色, Momoiro) for Decade; "Kuuga" (空我, Kūga; lit. clear self) for Kuuga; "Peach" (桃, Momo) for Den-O; and "Thief" (盗, Tō) and "Diend" (ディエンド, Diendo) for Diend.

=== Asumu ===
Asumu (アスム) is Hibiki's child apprentice, wanting to become a full-fledged Oni just like his master Hibiki in the taiko drum-based Hibiki Style (響鬼流, Hibiki Ryū) of Ongekidō. Asumu is the only student of the style, wearing a deep violet kimono with crimson accents (which was the outfit of his namesake from the Warring States era in Kamen Rider Hibiki & The Seven Senki, portrayed by Rakuto Tochihara). Before inheriting Hibiki's powers Asumu was able to assume a form similar to Transformed Kyosuke called Transformed Asumu (アスム変身体, Asumu Henshintai), only shorter, muscular, silver and has no "mask". As a result of his master losing the ability to control his Oni powers, Asumu later inherits the power to become Kamen Rider Hibiki (仮面ライダー響鬼, Kamen Raidā Hibiki), and uses his new abilities to work together with Akira and Todoroki to ally their schools.

Asumu later appears in the World of the Rider War after his reality is absorbed into it, being the only survivor of the attack of the Fangires led by Kamen Rider Saga thanks to Daiki. After defeating Super Apollo Geist, the convergence of worlds is not stopped and the World of Hibiki and Asumu disappear. Following Decade's death, he is revived and reunited with his friends. He later helps revive Decade and then appears along with Wataru to aid Decade in the final battle with Super Shocker to repay Decade for saving his world, turning into Armed Hibiki thanks to Decade's K-Touch and later into his Hibiki Ongekikou form with the All Rider Final Form Ride Card to fight the Super Crisis Fortress.

Asumu is portrayed by Kazuki Koshimizu (小清水 一揮, Koshimizu Kazuki).

=== Ibuki ===
Ibuki (イブキ) has the ability to transform into Kamen Rider Ibuki (仮面ライダー威吹鬼, Kamen Raidā Ibuki) who is master of the trumpet-based Ongekidō Ibuki Style (威吹鬼流, Ibuki Ryū), running the Ibuki Lesson Studio. He and his entirely female student body wear uwagi with hakama; Ibuki has kataginu on top of the uwagi. After listening to Akira's reasoning and Tsukasa's advice, he discards his rivalry with Zanki and steps down as teacher in favor of Akira. He later fights without his "mask" against the Bakegani, wielding a trombone version of the Ongekidan Reppu.

This version of Ibuki is portrayed by Jouji Shibue (渋江 譲二, Shibue Jōji), who previously portrayed a similarly named character from Kamen Rider Hibiki.

=== Akira ===
Akira (アキラ) is Ibuki's head apprentice who has the ability to transform into Kamen Rider Amaki (仮面ライダー天鬼, Kamen Raidā Amaki), who visually resembles Ibuki. During Gyuki's rampage, she transforms and fights alongside Todoroki to save Asumu, all without Ibuki's permission. Braving his displeasure later, she and Todoroki convince Ibuki and Zanki that allying the three schools would be the best thing for the future of Ongekidō. With Tsukasa's help, they convince their masters, and she is promoted from apprentice to teacher. Akira later appears in the World of the Rider War after her reality is absorbed into it, killed by Kamen Rider Saga. However, when Decade is killed by Kiva-la, the World of Hibiki is restored along with Akira and Todoroki.

Akira is portrayed by Nana Akiyama (秋山 奈々, Akiyama Nana), who previously portrayed a similar character Akira Amami from Kamen Rider Hibiki.

=== Zanki ===
Zanki (ザンキ) has the ability to transform into Kamen Rider Zanki (仮面ライダー斬鬼, Kamen Raidā Zanki) who is master of the guitar-based Ongekidō Zanki Style (斬鬼流, Zanki Ryū), stationed at a dojo. He is Ibuki's rival and thus their schools are sworn enemies. Zanki and his entirely male student body wear karate gi; Zanki's gi is black and he wears a black haori over it. After being convinced by his student to give the idea of allying the three schools a chance, he steps down as mentor in favor of Todoroki. He later joins the fight without his "mask" against the Bakegani, wielding his Retsuzan.

This version of Zanki is portrayed by Kenji Matsuda (松田 賢二, Matsuda Kenji), who previously portrayed a similarly named character from Kamen Rider Hibiki.

=== Todoroki ===
Todoroki (トドロキ) is Zanki's head apprentice who has the ability to transform into Kamen Rider Todoroki (仮面ライダー轟鬼, Kamen Raidā Todoroki). Though a member of Zanki's school, he has feelings for Akira, and sides with her and Asumu when discussing how important allying the three schools is to the future of Ongekidō. Zanki is not pleased by such an idea, but with the help of Tsukasa and Akira, he manages to convince his master, and he is allowed to move from an apprentice role to teaching. Todoroki later appears in the World of the Rider War after his reality is absorbed into it, killed off while attacked by Fangires under Saga. But once Decade is killed, Todoroki and Akira are restored along with their world.

This version of Todoroki is portrayed by Shingo Kawaguchi (川口 真五, Kawaguchi Shingo), who previously portrayed a similarly named character from Kamen Rider Hibiki.

=== Hibiki ===
Hibiki (ヒビキ) is the master of the taiko-based Ongekidō Hibiki Style. Because he lost his righteous heart through his desire to become stronger, Hibiki is consumed by his Oni power and starts his metamorphosis into the legendary half-Oni half-Makamou, Gyuki (牛鬼, Gyūki; Ox Demon). As a result, Hibiki adopts a lazy and rude attitude to most people, wears modern clothing, and even attempts to drive Asumu away in an attempt to retire from being an Oni. It is only when Kuuga is about to get killed by a Tengu Makamou that Hibiki decides to assume his Oni form and transforms into Gyuki as a result, wounding Ibuki and Zanki before being driven away by their pupils. Knowing that he will no longer be able to assume his human or Oni form again should he transform into Gyuki, he gives up his Transformation Tuning Fork Onkaku to Daiki Kaito to give to Asumu, who becomes the new Hibiki and must slay his former master as his final request.

Hibiki is portrayed by David Ito (デビット伊東, Debitto Itō), while his Gyuki form is voiced by Keikō Sakai (酒井 敬幸, Sakai Keikō).

=== Makamou ===
The Makamou (魔化魍, Makamō) are an assortment of monstrous creatures that usually dwell in the rural areas of Japan and consume any human beings as food. There are two main variations of this group: the bestial Giant Type and the humanoid Summer Type. In the first episode, Makamou such as the Bakegani and Ooari attack Natsumi while others like the Ubume were involved in the all-out battle among the monster groups that destroys the world.

- Kappa (カッパ): A Summer Type snapping turtle/frog-like Makamou, it was first one that Tsukasa and company encounter before Asumu arrives to fight it. In the end, the Kappa is destroyed by Decade using Kabuto's Rider Kick.
- Bakeneko (バケネコ): A trio of Summer Type humanoid cat Makamou. While the first two are destroyed by Zanki and Ibuki, the last one evades them before being destroyed by Decade's Dimension Kick.
- Ooari (オオアリ, Ōari): A Giant Type ant Makamou.
- Tengu (テング): A Summer Type ape/parrot Makamou that attacked Hibiki and Asumu, overpowering Kuuga until Hibiki assumes his Oni form and destroys the Makamou.
- Ubume (ウブメ): A Giant Type oarfish Makamou with white bird wings.
- Bakegani (バケガニ): A Giant Type swimming crab Makamou, larger than the average type with more pincers. It is released by Takeshi Asakura/Kamen Rider Ouja and appears with Narutaki riding on it once Gyuki is destroyed. The Bakegani is destroyed through the combined efforts of Hibiki, Decade, Diend, Amaki, Todoroki, Ibuki, and Zanki.
