= Dark Water (2002 film) =

- Theatrical release poster
- Directed by: Hideo Nakata
- Screenplay by: Yoshihiro Nakamura; Kenichi Suzuki
- Based on: "Floating Water" by Koji Suzuki
- Produced by: Takashige Ichise
- Starring: Hitomi Kuroki; Rio Kanno; Mirei Oguchi; Asami Mizukawa; Fumiyo Kohinata; Yu Tokui; Isao Yatsu; Shigemitsu Ogi
- Cinematography: Junichiro Hayashi
- Edited by: Nobuyuki Takahashi
- Music by: Kenji Kawai
- Production companies: Kadokawa Pictures; Oz Films; Dark Water Partners
- Distributed by: Toho
- Release date: January 19, 2002
- Running time: 101 minutes
- Country: Japan
- Language: Japanese
- Box office: $1.4 million

Dark Water (Note: 仄暗い水の底から (Japanese: Honogurai mizu no soko kara, Hepburn: lit. From the Depths of Dark Water)) is a 2002 Japanese supernatural horror film directed by Hideo Nakata and written by Yoshihiro Nakamura and Kenichi Suzuki. An adaptation of the 1996 short story "Floating Water" by Koji Suzuki, it follows a divorced mother (Hitomi Kuroki) who moves into a rundown apartment with her six-year-old daughter (Rio Kanno) and experiences supernatural occurrences linked to a constant leak of water from the apartment above.

The film received positive reviews. An American remake, directed by Walter Salles and starring Jennifer Connelly and Tim Roth, was released in 2005.

== Plot ==
Yoshimi Matsubara struggles to rebuild her life amidst a messy divorce from her husband Kunio Hamada, which sees her battling for sole custody of her six-year-old daughter Ikuko. She rents a rundown apartment, enrolls Ikuko in a nearby kindergarten, and gets a job as a proofreader for a small publishing company. The ceiling of their apartment has a water leak that slowly worsens, and she complains to the building superintendent Kamiya to no avail.

Yoshimi begins experiencing strange occurrences around the complex. A child's red schoolbag reappears no matter how often she tries to dispose of it, and she gets glimpses of a mysterious little girl. Several incidents remind her of the time she was abandoned at kindergarten as a child, which is shown in flashbacks. She is regularly late to pick up Ikuko from school and is stressed when her ex-husband tries to take Ikuko. Yoshimi learns of Mitsuko Kawai, a little girl who went missing a year earlier, from a missing person photo of her with a yellow raincoat and red schoolbag. She discovers that Mitsuko used to live in the abandoned unit directly above her apartment.

One day, Yoshimi finds Ikuko in the apartment upstairs, where the faucets have been left running and flooded the entire unit. Her lawyer talks to Kamiya, who finally agrees to fix the issue. Afterwards, things seemingly return to normal, but the red schoolbag reappears. Yoshimi goes to the roof and notices that the water tank was last opened and inspected over a year ago, shortly before Mitsuko was last seen. She has a vision which reveals to her that Mitsuko fell into the tank while trying to retrieve her red schoolbag and drowned. Meanwhile, Mitsuko's ghost attempts to drown Ikuko in the bathtub.

Yoshimi rushes back to her apartment, grabs an unconscious Ikuko, and flees from Mitsuko into the elevator. However, as the elevator closes, she sees that the figure pursuing her is Ikuko and that she has been carrying Mitsuko. A decayed Mitsuko clings to Yoshimi, who realizes she won't let go. As Ikuko cries and begs her to come back, Yoshimi sacrifices herself to appease Mitsuko's spirit. The two ascend in the elevator, which then explodes in a heavy torrent of water that knocks Ikuko to the floor.

A decade later, 16-year-old Ikuko lives with her father. She revisits the now-abandoned apartment block and notices that her old apartment looks oddly clean. She sees Yoshimi, who looks the same as she did a decade ago, and questions why she was not told that her mother was living nearby. Yoshimi apologizes that they cannot be together and affirms that she is happy as long as Ikuko is alright. Mitsuko briefly appears. Both spirits disappear and Ikuko realizes her mother always looked out for her.

== Cast ==
- Hitomi Kuroki as Yoshimi Matsubara
  - Yukiko Ikari as Young Yoshimi
- Rio Kanno as Ikuko Matsubara (6 years old)
  - Asami Mizukawa as Ikuko Hamada (16 years old)
- Mirei Oguchi as Mitsuko Kawai
- Fumiyo Kohinata as Kunio Hamada
- Yu Tokui as Ohta
- Isao Yatsu as Kamiya
- Shigemitsu Ogi as Kishida
- Maiko Asano as Young Yoshimi's Teacher
- Shinji Nomura as Mediator (Man)
- Kiriko Shimizu as Mediator (Woman)
- Teruko Hanahara as Old Lady (Twin, Elder) / Old Woman A
- Youko Yasuda as Kono
- Tarou Suwa as Old Lady (Twin, Younger) / Old Woman B
- Shichirou Gou as Nishioka
- Sachiko Hara as Kayo
- Tohru Shinagawa as Principal

== Production ==
Nakata said that he had been fascinated by water since childhood and associated it with both natural danger and the supernatural. He noted that Japanese ghost traditions frequently connect spirits with water, mist, rivers and the sea, an association that informed the film's use of water as its central source of unease.

The film's theme song, "Aozora", was performed by Japanese singer-songwriter Shikao Suga. A version titled "Aozora (Film Track)" was included on the film's soundtrack album, released on 17 January 2002.

== Release ==
The film was released theatrically in Japan on 19 January 2002, where it was distributed by Toho. During the chart week of 19–25 January, the film grossed $906,344 across 213 cinemas, ranking fourth at the Japanese box office.

Dark Water was screened at the Berlin International Film Festival on 7 February 2002, opening the festival's Panorama Special programme. Other festival appearances included the Edinburgh International Film Festival on 17 August 2002 and the Raindance Film Festival on 27 October 2002, both in the United Kingdom. It was also shown at the AFI Film Festival in the United States on November 9, 2002. In France, the film competed at the 2003 Gérardmer International Fantastic Film Festival, where it received three awards: the Grand Prix du Festival, the International Critics' Prize and the Youth Jury Prize.

The film was released theatrically in South Korea on 21 February 2003, attracting a total of 198,824 cinema admissions. That same year, the film was released in France on 26 February, Russia on 15 May, the United Kingdom on 6 June and in the Philippines on 30 July.

On 13 April 2022, the film was re-released in French cinemas in a 4K restoration as part of a Japanese horror trilogy programme alongside Ring and Audition.

=== Home video ===
In Japan, VAP released Dark Water on DVD on 1 July 2002. The release included behind-the-scenes footage, interviews with the cast and crew, theatrical trailers and promotional videos. In the United Kingdom, Tartan Video released the film on DVD in November 2003, featuring Japanese audio with DTS surround sound, English subtitles, trailers and bonus footage. An American DVD release of Dark Water was dubbed in 2004 by ADV Films, and later released by Section23 on June 21, 2005. Arrow Video released Dark Water on Blu-Ray (AV068) on October 25, 2016. It was packaged with a 1080p transfer Blu-Ray disc and separate standard definition DVD disc.

In France, The Jokers released a limited collector's edition on 4K Ultra HD Blu-ray and Blu-ray on 19 April 2023, featuring French and Japanese audio tracks. Its supplementary features included a 26-minute career retrospective interview with director Hideo Nakata and a 30-minute discussion of the film's cinematography with Junichiro Hayashi.

In 2024, Arrow Video released limited-edition 4K Ultra HD Blu-rays in the United Kingdom on 18 March and the United States on 19 March. The editions featured a 4K presentation in Dolby Vision, alongside interviews with Nakata, original author Koji Suzuki and Hayashi, archival interviews with cast members, a making-of documentary and an illustrated collector's booklet.

== Reception ==
On the review aggregator website Rotten Tomatoes, Dark Water has an approval rating of 84% (based on 19 critics). Peter Bradshaw of The Guardian gave the film 4 out of 5 stars, writing that "its denouement delivers not just a flash of fear but a strange, sweet charge of pathos—and the combination adds up to the most disturbing spell in the cinema I've had in a very long time". Alexander Walker of the London Evening Standard also gave the film a positive review, writing that "its cleverness relies on transferring our concern from the supernatural events emanating from one lost child to the natural fear of a mother losing her own child to the other world". Katie Rife of The A.V. Club recommended the film for horror fans, writing that "the J-horror boom of the '90s and early '00s produced some extremely creepy ghost stories, and Dark Water is one of the creepiest, and saddest, of them all".

Thomas Spurlin of DVD Talk gave the film 3.5/5 stars, writing that it "doesn't pack as much of a suspenseful punch as other entries in the J-Horror subgenre, but the heaviness of its supernatural moisture-soaked atmosphere and the melancholy angle of its parental theatrics fill that void". Nicholas Rucka of Midnight Eye called the film "a simply passable horror viewing experience" and criticized its "weak story resolve and mediocre characterization" but wrote that it "is worth watching for a good chill".

In a 2020 article for the British Film Institute, Katherine McLaughlin included the film in a list of 10 great Japanese ghost stories, referring to it as an "eerie and heartbreaking adaptation" that "strikes a disquieting mood".

== Legacy ==
Dark Water was remade as an American film in 2005, directed by Walter Salles and starring Jennifer Connelly. The remake was part of a wave of American remakes of Japanese horror films during the 2000s.

In 2024, Dark Water was included in a retrospective of Japanese horror films at Film Forum in New York. That same year, Michael Atkinson of The Criterion Collection examined the film's themes of climate change, highlighting its use of flooding and water damage in the midst of the protagonist's custody dispute. In February 2026, Rotten Tomatoes ranked Dark Water 40th on its list of the 100 best horror films of the 2000s.

== Related works ==
The film's original Japanese title, Honogurai Mizu no Soko kara (仄暗い水の底から, From the Depths of Dark Water), is also the title of the original short-story collection by Koji Suzuki, published by Kadokawa Shoten on 28 February 1996. A manga adaptation illustrated by Meimu was published in Japan on 18 January 2002 by Kadokawa Shoten. The English-language manga edition was published as Dark Water by ADV Manga in 2004.

== See also ==
- List of ghost films
