= Topless (film) =

- Movie poster
- Directed by: Eiji Uchida
- Written by: Eiji Uchida
- Music by: MARRR「Keep on keeping on」
- Release date: 2008
- Running time: 108 minutes
- Country: Japan
- Language: Japanese

Topless (トップレス, Toppuresu) is a 2008 Japanese film directed by Eiji Uchida.

== Cast ==
- Shimizu Mina as Natsuko
- Erika Okuda as Tomomi
- Aya Ōmasa as Kana
- So Sakamoto as Koji
- Ryunosuke Kawai as Kenta
- Hako as Noriko
- Sayoko Kobayashi as Miyo
