= Memeco Sakata =

Japanese actress, singer and gravure idol

- 坂田米米子
- Born: February 17, 1985 (age 40); Fukushima, Japan
- Other names: Hiroko Satō (佐藤寛子)
- Occupations: actress; singer; gravure idol
- Years active: 2002–present
- Height: 5 ft 3 in (1.60 m)

Memeco Sakata (坂田米米子, Sakata Memeko, born February 17, 1985), formerly known as Hiroko Sato (佐藤 寛子, Satō Hiroko), is a Japanese actress, singer and gravure idol.

== Biography ==
Sato was born in Fukushima but grew up in Kanagawa.

In 2002, Sato made her acting debut in the low budget horror movie Scare and began a career as a gravure idol. Much of her work was published in Japanese men's magazines such as Sabra and Weekly Playboy. Between 2002 and 2008, she starred in a number of idol movies released on DVD.

In 2004, Sato played a role in the low budget movie Cursed.

In 2005, Sato released a single called Can't Hide, which was released under the Girls Record label.

In 2007, Sato appeared in a photobook called Portrait that was photographed in Fukushima by Japanese photographer Yoshihisa Marutani.

In 2008, Sato announced on her blog that she was no longer doing gravure modelling and would instead focus on drama and acting.

Sato's most popular movie role to date was in the acclaimed 2010 drama, ヌードの夜/愛は惜しみなく奪う, known in English as A Night in Nude -Salvation.

Sato works for NHK Radio in Japan as a co-host of the radio bookstore program Talking With Matsuo Hall with host Takashi Matsuo. She is managed by the Beside agency in Tokyo.

On April 9, 2018, she announced on her Instagram page that she had changed her stage name to Memeco Sakata.

== Works ==
=== Television ===
- Madan Senki Ryukendo (2006): Kaori Nose
- Kamen Rider Decade (2009): Ai Yashiro (Episodes 2–3), Toko Yashiro (Episodes 12–13)
- Garo: Yami o Terasu Mono (2013): Enhou

=== DVDs ===
- First Touch (2002)
- Peek A Boo! (2002)
- Pure Smile (2003)
- Lily White (2003)
- Himitsu (2004)
- H2O (2004)
- Lover's Eyes (2004)
- Gekkan Sato Hiroko (2004)
- Sato Hiroko Premium (2004)
- Shouwa Nostalgia (2005)
- Truth (2005)
- Real B Face (2005)
- Move in Diosa (2005)
- Tooru Maboroshi Kagami (2005)
- Hiroko to Panda to Shanghai de (2006)
- Hold Nothing (2007)

=== Photobooks ===
- Peek A Boo! (2002)
- Suimitsutou (2003)
- Fine (2003)
- Koibumi – Chiisana Koi no Monogatari (2003)
- Himitsu (2003)
- H2O (2004)
- Sato Hiroko Young Sunday Special Graphic Vol. 5 (2004)
- Hiroko Mix (2004)
- Gekkan Sato Hiroko Shincho Mook (2004)
- WPB-Net Remix DVD Sato Hiroko Anniversary (2004)
- Jounetsu (2004)
- Diosa (2005)

=== Singles ===
- Can't Hide (2005)

=== Compilations ===
- Girl's Box ~Best Hits Compilation Winter~ (2005)
- Very Merry X'mas (with Sayaka Isoyama and Aki Hoshino, 2005)
