= Erika Okuda =

Japanese actress

Erika Okuda (奥田恵梨華, Erika Okuda; born February 24, 1981) is a Japanese actress.

== Filmography ==
- Tokyo Zombie (2005) as Yoko
- Humoresque: Sakasama no chou (2006)
- 3 Year Pregnant (2006) as Midoriko
- M (2007)
- The Red Army (2007)
- Bandage (2008) as Kozue
- Bakabakance (2008)
- Topless (2008)
- Sweet Rain (2008)
- The Code (2009)
- 28 1/2 (2010)
- Salaryman NEO The Movie (2011)
- The Woman of S.R.I. the Movie (2021)
