= Maria Takagi =

Japanese pornographic actress (born 1978)

- 高樹マリア
- Born: October 25, 1978 (age 47); Chiba Prefecture, Japan
- Other names: Yukiko Hara; Rika Inoue

Maria Takagi (Japanese: 高樹マリア, Hepburn: Takagi Maria) is a Japanese TV and film actress and a former adult video (AV) star. Early in her career as a model, she also used the names Yukiko Hara and Rika Inoue.

== Life and career ==
=== Gravure model ===
Maria Takagi was born in Chiba Prefecture, Japan on October 25, 1978. Using the name Yukiko Hara (原由紀子), she released a "gravure" (non-nude) photo album Nishi-Shinjuku Love Story (西新宿恋物語) in June 1998. She made an early movie appearance in the August 1998 mainstream film Yoi Yume Yakei (酔夢夜景), a love story directed by pink film director Shuji Kataoka. In November 1998, under the name Rika Inoue (いのうえ梨花), she posed for the men's magazine Urecco and as Maria Takagi, issued a photobook of nude pictures titled Blue in December 2000. The next year, Takagi starred in the erotic fantasy Mermaid Girl (マーメイド ～海から来た少女～) written and directed by Kei Marimura which reached theaters in July 2001. Takagi also had a small part in the Kyoto Broadcasting System TV show HATU Vampire Syndrome (ＨＡＴＵ ～ヴァンパイア・シンドローム～) directed by Naoyuki Tomomatsu and broadcast on January 5, 2002. Later in 2002, she had a role in the erotic drama Yūrakuchō yakei (有楽町夜景) which premiered in Ikebukuro in September 2002.

=== AV début ===
Takagi made her début as an adult video actress with the December 2002 release Super-Star for the Max-A Calen label. At the time of her début, AllAbout columnist Hiroshi Asuka commented on her reputation as an actress and her star quality. Six months later, the same writer described her as one of the top actresses in the adult field. It was announced in October 2003 that Takagi would play the "other woman" of a married man in the Fuji TV drama series Someone is next to you (あなたの隣に誰かいる, Anata no tonari ni dare ka iru) but that she would be continuing in her AV career. The Japanese newspaper Mainichi Shimbun reported in 2003 that she was the highest paid AV actress in Japan.

In late 2003, Takagi was the winner of five awards at the Kuki Inc.-owned XCity's Adult Video Grand Prix Awards. The biggest adult site in Japan at that time, XCity conferred upon Takagi both the Best New Actress and Best Actress awards, and the Best Video Title, Best Conversation, and Prettiest Face awards of 2003. In December 2003, Takagi celebrated her first anniversary with the Max-A studio with the video Maria Perfect One Year!!. Her last adult video, Fin...Maria Takagi, was released in February 2004 completing the 15 videos that she had originally contracted for with Max-A.

=== Television and movies ===
Takagi's first feature film after her retirement from adult videos was the romantic horror comedy Ghost Shout (ゴーストシャウト, Gōsuto shauto) with Saori Takizawa which was first shown in Tokyo theaters in December 2004. The next year, in addition to guest appearances on various TV shows, Takagi appeared in two horror films, the mock documentary Noroi where she played herself and the manga-based Tokyo Zombie directed by Sakichi Sato.

Takagi was a regular on the Tokai TV drama Keiyaku Kekkon (契約結婚), as the "femme fatale" Keiko Tokumaru, during its July to September 2005 run, and also on the Fuji TV hospital series Ns' Aoi (Ns’ あおい) playing the part of Nurse Nishi Tomoko from January to March 2006. In September 2007, she played Kasumi in the TV Asahi drama Kuroi taiyō '07 Supesharu (黒い太陽 ’０７ スペシャル), a TV special movie based on the Kuroi taiyō TV series.

Beginning with the fourth installment in July 2007, Takagi has been cast as hotel employee Kozue Morita on the two-hour TV Asahi mystery movies Onsen maruhi daisakusen! (温泉㊙大作戦). The series, part of the TV Asahi Saturday Wide Theater (土曜ワイド劇場, Doyō waido gekijō), aired its 12th episode in January 2013. In June 2009, Takagi appeared in Ju-on: Black Ghost (呪怨 黒い少女, Ju-on: Kuroi shōjo), part of the long running Japanese Ju-on horror film series known in English as The Grudge. Takagi had a major role in the 2015 film Shinda Me o Shita Shonen, a youth drama based on the manga of the same name by Tomohiro Koizumi.

== Select filmography ==
- Noroi (August 2005)
- Tokyo Zombie (December 2005)
