= Cursed (2004 film) =

- Directed by: Yoshihiro Hoshino
- Screenplay by: Yoshihiro Hoshino
- Based on: "Cursed" by Yumeaki Hirayama
- Produced by: Digital Frontier; TaKe Shobô
- Starring: Kyôko Akiba; Yumeaki Hirayama; Takaaki Iwao; Etsuyo Mitani; Hiroko Sato; Osamu Takahashi; Susumu Terajima
- Music by: Kuniyuki Morohashi
- Release date: May 29, 2004 (Shibuya)
- Running time: 81 minutes
- Country: Japan
- Language: Japanese

Cursed (「超」怖い話Ａ 闇の鴉, 'Chô' kowai hanashi A: yami no karasu) is a 2004 Japanese horror film. Based on the written work of Yumeaki Hirayama, it is the directorial debut of Yoshihiro Hoshino.

The full Japanese title is Extremely Scary Story A: Dark Crow, and is the first theatrical release of the Cho Kowai Hanashi series. The story centres on a haunted convenience store, the disturbing effect it has on the owners and other local residents, and the grisly deaths of the customers who shop there.

== Plot ==
Two high school students arrive at the Mitsuya convenience store. One of the students, Yuko, proclaims she cannot enter the shop. However, she backs away too far and is killed by a truck.

Some time later, Ryouko Kagami, a representative of the Cosmo Mart chain, seeks to purchase the store on behalf of her boss, Tejima. She explains to the shop owners, Mr. and Mrs. Kitaura, that Tejima could not be present because of an accident in which his feet were amputated, to which the Kitauras react with amusement. As Ryouko begins doing an inventory of the store, she befriends a part-time employee named Nao Niigaki. A customer in a hooded coat comes in and starts reading a magazine. Nao tries to get a good look at his face, but can only see darkness.

Later, a man comes in and makes a purchase for 666 yen. While walking home, the man encounters a white ball which has rolled from a dark alley. He picks it up and walks into the alley where a voice asks him to return the ball. He walks into the darkness, disappears, and the ball is bounced outside again.

While Nao sorts the drinks in the freezer, she sees a pair of eyes staring back at her. Meanwhile, Ryouko finds a product that expired three years previously. She questions the Kitauras, who blankly continue staring in a CCTV camera. Two crows crash into the window, killing themselves. Nao and Ryouko go to outside to investigate, where the Kitauras are somehow already present and hosing away the crow remains, laughing madly. That night, a man and woman make purchases for 699 yen and 999 yen respectively. On the way home, the woman is stalked by a man with a sledgehammer, who eventually appears inside her apartment and attacks her.

The next day, Ryouko receives a call from Tejima, who tells her "everyone has feet" before the signal cuts to static. After dark, the night clerk, Komori, serves the hooded man. The till registers 44.44444 yen, and Komori looks up to find only blackness in the hood. The man then forces Komori's head inside the hood. Komori comes out in shock and panic. Ryouko arrives and sees that one of Komori's eyes has monstrously bulged out of his sockets. Ryouko takes over Komori's shift and charges a woman 666 yen. A man is initially charged 907 yen until he is hypnotized by steamed buns; he buys one and the price changes to 999.

That night, the woman cooks food for her boyfriend when a blackout occurs. She opens her fridge to find a long corridor from which a pale girl emerges. The girl approaches the woman and tricks her into fatally stabbing her boyfriend, before the woman is suffocated by a bag over her head. Meanwhile, the man visits a bathhouse. Witnessing strange phenomena in the bath, he attempts to leave when he slips on mysterious hair and is knocked unconscious. When he wakes up, the man is attacked and killed by the elderly clerk of the bathhouse. He grabs the man's steamed bun and eats it while watching the television.

That same night, Nao is standing at a railroad crossing when the hooded man appears and tries to pull her toward the passing train. She resists until the train passes and the hooded man disappears. The following day, Nao finds a homeless woman who tells her to come with her to learn more about the store. Nao and the woman are joined by Ryouko at the park. The woman reveals that the store's owner mistreated his contractor when it was being built. The contractor, in anger, broke apart the tombstones of people without families and used the fragments to build the store's foundation, resulting in its haunting. Ryouko tells Nao to stop working there.

Nao comes to the store and saves Komori from a ghost in the bathroom. Komori, regaining his sanity, runs out of the store where, in the sun, he baptizes himself in the river. He throws away his jacket, regains his composure, and leaves with Nao. Ryouko, walking toward the store to work, finds a wheelchair rolling down the hill. Her boss Temjia tells her every ghost does not have feet and he is happy. Ryouko thanks him and walks away. The movie goes back to the beginning, now shot from Yuko's point of view, where she sees the tortured souls inside the store.
