= Marika Matsumoto =

Japanese actress (born 1984)

- 松本 まりか
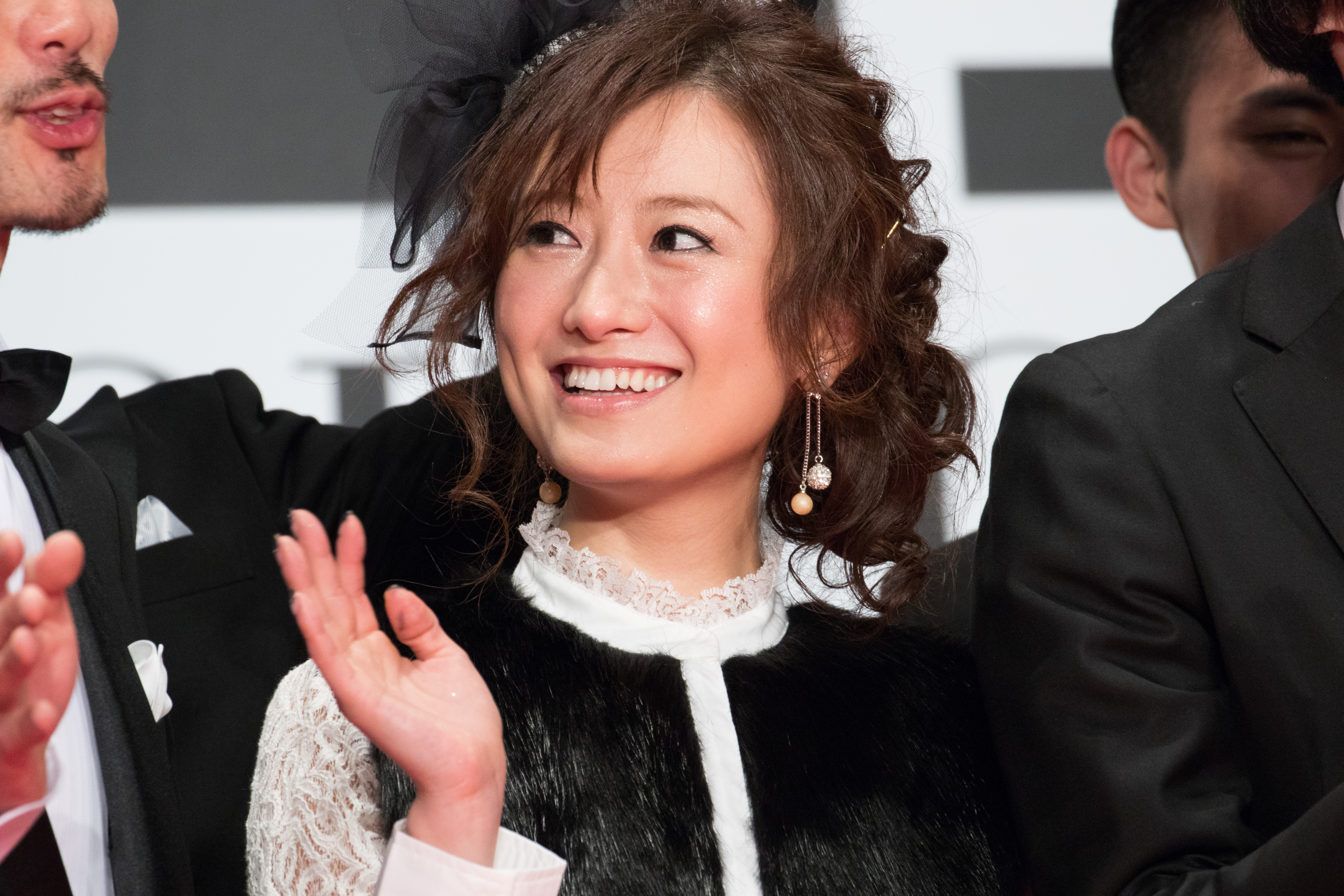
- Born: September 12, 1984 (age 42); Tokyo, Japan
- Occupations: Actress, voice actress
- Years active: 2000–present
- Agent: Ken-On
- Height: 160 cm (5 ft 3 in)

Marika Matsumoto (松本 まりか, Matsumoto Marika; born September 12, 1984) is a Japanese actress. From 2001 and 2003, she was known as "Mini Stop-chan", acting as the mascot for the Ministop convenience store chain commercials in Japan. Since November 2005, she has been on the A&G Radio Show: Anisupa! segment Anisupa Kōnin Akujo Queen. Her major roles in anime include Maya Tōmi in Fafner in the Azure, Chocolat Meilleure in Sugar Sugar Rune, Miwako Sakurada in Paradise Kiss, Kazamori Sasa in Un-Go, and Diancie in Pokémon the Movie: Diancie and the Cocoon of Destruction. In video games, she provides the voice of Rikku in Final Fantasy X, Final Fantasy X-2, and Kingdom Hearts II. In live-action films, she portrayed herself in the Kōji Shiraishi-directed horror film The Curse, and Yuka Morita in the Takashi Shimizu film Reincarnation.

== Filmography ==
=== Live-action film ===
List of acting performances in film
Year	Title	Role	Notes	Source
2005	Trilogia: Existence		Lead role; anthology film	
2005	Yaji and Kita: The Midnight Pilgrims			
2005	Noroi: The Curse	Herself		
2006	Reincarnation	Yuka Morita		
2006	My Grandfather's Clock			
2007	Serebu ga Kekkonshitai 13 no Akuma	Miho		
2008	Hikari sasu Umi, Boku no Fune			
2010	Space Battleship Yamato			
2013	Cold Bloom	Shoko		
2017	Memoirs of a Murderer	Minako Kawakita		
2017	Opening Night	Marika Hara		
2017	Same Old, Same Old	Aoba Harada		
2017	Let Go of My Teen Days			
2017	Gukoroku: Traces of Sin	Reiko Yamamoto		
2017	Tornado Girl			
2018	Nisekoi	Kyoko		
2018	The Sacrament	Matsumoto		
2019	Farewell Song	TV reporter		
2021	Shrieking in the Rain	Hanako	Lead role	
2022	Yokai Housemate: Is He Prince Charming?	Oiwa-san		
2022	The Way of the Househusband: The Cinema	Koharu		
2022	It's All My Fault			
2022	Nighttime Warbles	Yūko		
2022	Whisper of the Heart			
2023	Ice Cream Fever	Yū Takashima		
2023	Kyrie			
2024	The Women in the Lakes	Kayo Toyoda	Lead role	
2026	The Potentials	Rika Tsuchiya		

=== Live-action television ===
List of acting performances in television
Year	Title	Role	Notes	Source
2000	Rokubanme no Sayoko			
2000	Aoi	Senhime	Eps. 22 and 23; Taiga drama	
2000	Himitsu Club o-daiba.com	Ayano Itakura		
2001	Kabushiki Kaisha o-daiba.com	Ayano Itakura		
2002	Taiyo no Kisetsu			
2003	Aka-chan wo Sagase!			
2005	Tiger & Dragon		Ep. 3	
2006	Junjō Kirari	Kaoruko Takano	Asadora	
2007	Hotaru no Hikari	Suzuko Murota		
2010	GeGeGe no Nyōbō	Setsuko	Asadora	
2012	Penance	Kaori	Ep. 1; miniseries	
2014	Reverse Edge: Ōkawabata Tanteisha	Mami Iikura	Ep. 9	
2016	A Girl & Three Sweethearts		Ep. 2	
2016	Shōjo no Miru Yume	Mizuho Kanazawa	TV movie	
2016	Midnight Diner	Midori	Ep. 5	
2017	Quartet	Ema Ōhashi	Ep. 10	
2017	My High School Business	Yuriko Kōsaka		
2018	Holiday Love	Rina Izutsu		
2018	Caseworker's Diary	Azusa Maruyama	Eps. 9 and 10	
2018	Black Scandal	Sara Fujisaki		
2018	CSI: Crime Scene Talks (Season 5)	Anri Ihikura	Ep. 6	
2019	Doctor-X: Surgeon Michiko Daimon (Season 6)	Dr. Maria Nakayama	Ep. 8	
2019	Sherlock: Untold Stories	Teiko Akabane	Ep. 1	
2019	Shiyakusho	Miwakio Nishikawa		
2019	The Good Wife	Yuina Ogawa	Ep. 5	
2019	Emergency Interrogation Room	Akane Kashimura	Ep. 4	
2019	Cheers to Miki Clinic	Yukari Yūzuki		
2019	Dying Eye	Narumi Murakami		
2020	Pareto's Miscalculation	Yoshiko Anzai		
2020	Path of the Dragons	Mayumi Kirishima		
2020	Akira Hamura: The Detective Most Unfortunate in the World	Tamaki Noguchi	Ep. 3	
2020	Throw It Away, Adachi	Yōko	Ep. 7	
2020	A Day-Off of Ryoma Takeuchi		Ep. 6	
2020	How to Eliminate My Teacher	Shizuka Maeno		
2020–22	Yokai Housemate	Oiwa-san	2 seasons	
2021	Mukō no Hate	Ritsuko Ikematsu	Lead role	
2021	Do You Still Swear Love?	Jun Sumisu	Lead role	
2021–22	The Great Haruko	Izumi Kikuchi	2 seasons	
2022	Teen Regime	Saki Yamaguchi	Miniseries	
2023	What Will You Do, Ieyasu?	Onna-ōnezumi	Taiga drama	
2024	Miss Target	Sumire		
2024	Until I Destroy My Husband's Family	Minori Kisaragi		

=== TV anime ===
List of voice performances in TV anime
Year	Title	Role	Notes	Source
2004	Fafner in the Azure	Maya Tōmi		
2005	Sugar Sugar Rune	Chocola Meilleure		
2005	Paradise Kiss	Miwako Sakurada		
2006	Pururun! Shizuku-Chan	Norrin	Also Aha in 2007	
2008	Mach Girl	Lip	Anime shorts for Speed Racer spin-off	
2011	Un-Go	Kazamori Sasa		
2015	Fafner in the Azure: Exodus	Maya Tōmi		

=== Animated films ===
List of voice performances in film
Year	Title	Role	Notes	Source
2010	Fafner of the Azure: Heaven and Earth	Maya Tōmi		
2014	Pokémon the Movie: Diancie and the Cocoon of Destruction	Diancie		
2021	Tropical-Rouge! Pretty Cure the Movie: The Snow Princess and the Miraculous Ring!	Princess Sharon		

=== Video games ===
List of voice performances in video games
Year	Title	Role	Notes	Source
2001	Final Fantasy X	Rikku	PS2, also HD Remaster in 2013	
2003	Final Fantasy X-2	Rikku	PS2, also HD Remaster in 2013	
2005	Fafner in the Azure	Maya Tomi		
2005	Kingdom Hearts II	Rikku	PS2, also Final Mix in 2007	
2011	Final Fantasy Type-0	Mutsuki	PSP	
2016	World of Final Fantasy	Rikku		
2024	War of the Visions: Final Fantasy Brave Exvius	Rikku		
2026	Dissidia Duellum Final Fantasy	Rikku		

=== Other website ===
List of voice performances in other works
Year	Title	Role	Notes	Source
2001–03	Mini Stop	Mini Stop-chan	character in commercials	
