= Tokyo Zombie =

Japanese manga

- Japanese cover of Tokyo Zombie

東京ゾンビ (Tōkyō Zonbi)
- Manga
- Written by: Yusaku Hanakuma
- Published by: Seirinkogeisha
- English publisher: NA: Last Gasp
- Magazine: Ax
- Published: September 1999
- Volumes: 1
- Live-action film
- Directed by: Sakichi Sato
- Written by: Sakichi Sato
- Music by: Hiroshi Futami
- Studio: Toshiba Entertainment
- Released: December 10, 2005 (Japan)
- Runtime: 103 min

Tokyo Zombie (Japanese: 東京ゾンビ, Hepburn: Tōkyō Zonbi) is a Japanese heta-uma horror manga written in 1999 by Yusaku Hanakuma. It was subsequently made into a 2005 Japanese film written and directed by Sakichi Sato. The films stars Tadanobu Asano, Show Aikawa, and Erika Okuda. The film was released in North America, UK and later Australia and New Zealand in 2009.

== Plot ==
Fujio and Mitsuo are two full-time slackers who work in a fire extinguisher factory. The two spend their lunch hours training to fulfill their dreams of being jujitsu champions. One day, they murder their boss and dump his body on a Tokyo toxic waste dump known as "Black Fuji".

Things suddenly become worse when an army of the undead rises from the waste dump and begin to attack the living. In order to survive, they will have to employ their limited jujitsu skills, to either help or escape Tokyo.

== Film cast ==
- Tadanobu Asano – Fujio
- Show Aikawa – Mitsuo
- Erika Okuda – Yoko
- Arata Furuta – Ishihara
- Kazuo Umezu – Akiyama / Prince
- Hina Matsuoka – Fumiyo
- Maria Takagi – Yocchan's sister

== Reception ==
In a list of "10 Great Zombie Manga", Anime News Network's Jason Thompson placed Tokyo Zombie in ninth place, calling it "good, cheesy, ultraviolent entertainment".
