= Keikō Sakai =

Japanese voice actor (born 1972)

Keikō Sakai (酒井敬幸, Sakai Keikō; born December 25, 1972 in Fukushima Prefecture) is a Japanese voice actor currently working for 81 Produce.

== Roles in TV shows ==
- Cameraman in 009-1 episode 5
- Agomi, Bar Owner, Scoundrel, and Subordinate B in Gintama
- Worker C in Hataraki Man
- Male Staff B in Kaleido Star
- Interviewer in Karin episode 6
- Kingman in Megaman NT Warrior
- Guard in Pumpkin Scissors
- Benjamin in Zoids: New Century Zero
- The Commanding Officer in Fist of the North Star: Raoh Side Story Junai Arc
- Fist of the North Star: Raoh Side Story Fierce Fighting Arc
- A Seikan Gang Member 2, Customer 3, Bandit, and Assassin 3 in The Story of Saiunkoku
- Raijin, Waraji in Naruto
- Sweden in Hetalia: Axis Powers
- Mammoth in Teen Titans
- Tank Lepanto in One Piece
- Bug-Eaten in Jojo’s Bizarre Adventure
- Minoton in Soaring Sky! Pretty Cure

=== Tokusatsu roles ===
- Owl Lord / Volucris Ulucus (ep 43 – 44) in Kamen Rider Agito
- Grorzaian HellHeaven (ep 3) in Tokusou Sentai Dekaranger
- Confrontation Beast Crocodile-Fist Niwa (ep 28) in Juken Sentai Gekiranger
- Chameleon Fangire (ep 21 – 22), Bat Fangire Reborn (ep 48) in Kamen Rider Kiva
- Batsu (ep 49 – 50) in Tomica Hero: Rescue Force
- Gyuki (ep 18 – 19) in Kamen Rider Decade
- Doras/Ultimate D in Kamen Rider × Kamen Rider W & Decade: Movie War 2010
- Armored Warrior Inhumanoid (Complete) in Kamen Rider × Kamen Rider OOO & W Featuring Skull: Movie War Core
- Bauzer (ep 9) in Kaizoku Sentai Gokaiger
- Space Spider-Man in Kamen Rider × Super Sentai × Space Sheriff: Super Hero Taisen Z

== Roles in video games ==
- Protectos the Goreroid in Mega Man ZX
- Serizawa Kamo in Bakumatsu Renka Shinsengumi
- Grad in Grand Summoners
- Hoolay in Honkai: Star Rail

== Dubbing ==
- Sushi Chef in Cars 2
- Eduardo in Foster's Home for Imaginary Friends
- Hiro in Thomas & Friends: All Engines Go
