= List of Kamen Rider Decade characters in the New Worlds =

The characters of Kamen Rider Decade exist amongst various iterations of reality within the series referred to as an A.R. World (Another Rider's/Alternate Reality World). The New Worlds (新たな世界, Aratana Sekai) are the A.R. Worlds that are not based on a previous entry of the Kamen Rider Series from the Heisei period.

== World of Negatives ==
The World of Negatives (ネガの世界, Nega no Sekai) is a parallel world created in the image of the one Natsumi comes from, but is actually home to monsters who assume human form and serve Dark Riders (ダークライダー, Dāku Raidā) who hunt down any real humans that are still alive. The backdrop used to enter this world depicts the destruction of the first world caused by the monsters' conflict among themselves, the scene itself matching up with the mother and child running from the flames in the first episode, just before the event was frozen by Wataru Kurenai. In this A.R. World, Tsukasa becomes a contest winner and male model. Daiki's treasure in this world is the K-Touch, which ultimately ends up in the hands of Tsukasa, allowing him to gain access to Decade Complete Form.

=== Otoya Kurenai ===
The World of Negatives' version of Otoya Kurenai (紅 音也, Kurenai Otoya) is a young man who leads the Dark Riders, using his connection to Kivat-bat the 2nd to become Kamen Rider Dark Kiva (仮面ライダーダークキバ, Kamen Raidā Dāku Kiba). Revealing himself to Tsukasa while thanking him for saving their world, Otoya has an agenda to have Tsukasa become the king of the World of Negatives, testing him personally to confirm it. But his plan fails as Tsukasa refuses and defeats his allies, leaving Otoya as the only surviving Dark Rider.

This version of Otoya Kurenai is portrayed by Kouhei Takeda (武田 航平, Takeda Kōhei), who previously portrayed the character of the same name from Kamen Rider Kiva.

=== Natsumi ===
The World of Negatives' Natsumi (ネガの世界の夏海, Nega no Sekai no Natsumi) is the World of Negatives counterpart of the real Natsumi Hikari and one of the few remaining humans in the World of Negatives. She confronts her counterpart in an attempt to warn her of Otoya's scheme, only to be forced to dig up the K-Touch she had hidden. She eventually gives her goodbyes to Natsumi while entrusting the K-Touch to Tsukasa, remaining in her world out of hope for the future.

Kanna Mori portrays the World of Negatives's Natsumi alongside her primary role as Natsumi Hikari.

=== Ryuga ===
Kamen Rider Ryuga (仮面ライダーリュウガ, Kamen Raidā Ryūga) is a Dark Rider who murdered and assumed the guise of the World of Negatives counterpart of Hirohiko Sato (佐藤 博彦, Satō Hirohiko), Natsumi's TG Club high school classmate. He is destroyed by Decade Complete Form with aid from Ryuki Survive.

Ryuga and Hirohiko Sato are portrayed by Takatsugu Iwama (岩間 天嗣, Iwama Takatsugu).

=== Orga ===
Kamen Rider Orga (仮面ライダーオーガ, Kamen Raidā Ōga) is a Dark Rider who murdered and assumed the guise of the World of Negatives counterpart of Kenji Sakata (坂田 健児, Sakata Kenji), Natsumi's TG Club high school classmate. He is destroyed by Decade Complete Form with aid from Faiz Blaster Form.

Orga and Kenji Sakata are portrayed by Keisuke Sakamoto (坂本 恵介, Sakamoto Keisuke).

=== Dark Kabuto ===
Kamen Rider Dark Kabuto (仮面ライダーダークカブト, Kamen Raidā Dāku Kabuto) is a Dark Rider who murdered and assumed the guise of the World of Negatives counterpart of Kazuyoshi Aoyagi (青柳 和良, Aoyagi Kazuyoshi), Natsumi's TG Club high school classmate. He is destroyed by Decade Complete Form with aid from Kabuto Hyper Form.

Dark Kabuto and Kazuyoshi Aoyagi are portrayed by Yohta Mori (森 陽太, Mori Yōta).

=== Alternative ===
Pseudo-Rider Alternative (疑似ライダーオルタナティブ, Giji Raidā Orutanatibu) is a Dark Rider who assumed the guise of the World of Negatives counterpart of Tanaka (田中), Natsumi's high school teacher. Though ordered by Otoya to keep an eye on Natsumi rather than kill her, he intentionally decides to attack Natsumi, resulting in Dark Kiva beating him merciless. Alternative is then later destroyed by Diend. Although referred to as Alternative, the suit is actually that of Alternative Zero (オルタナティブ・ゼロ, Orutanatibu Zero).

Alternative and Tanaka are portrayed by Masayasu Kitayama (北山 雅康, Kitayama Masayasu).

=== Chinatsu ===
Chinatsu (千夏) is Natsumi's high school friend who was the president of the student council. Her World of Negatives counterpart died giving her Natsumi the K-Touch which she stole from the Dark Riders.

Chinatsu is portrayed by Juri Ihata (井端 珠里, Ihata Juri).

=== Raydragoons ===
Raydragoons (レイドラグーン, Reidoragūn) are Dragonfly Mirror Monsters that live in the World of Negatives as Otoya's minions, taking the guise of normal humans. They are destroyed by Diend.

== World of Diend ==
The World of Diend (ディエンドの世界, Diendo no Sekai) is the world where Daiki comes from, similar to the World of Blade due to the presence of Undead known as Roaches (ローチ, Rōchi). More specifically, it seems to be related to the film Missing Ace, due to being home to the three Ace Riders (even played by the same actors) and Jashin 14 (known as the Fourteen), characters exclusive to the film. But as the world is dominated by the Roaches and their leader Fourteen, the human populace is mostly brainwashed into a state of euphoria and conditioned to see Kamen Riders as disruptors of the peace, and anyone who disobeys the rules, even slightly, has their free will completely removed. The backdrop used to enter this world depicts a wanted poster with Diend's symbol on it in the foreground and a cityscape in the background. Within this A.R. World, Tsukasa assumes the role of a traveling salesman before being labeled a criminal. Daiki's treasure in his homeworld is freeing his brother from the control of Fourteen, only to learn he was not controlled at all.

=== Junichi Kaito ===
Junichi Kaito (海東 純一, Kaitō Jun'ichi) is Daiki's older brother within his home world. Like Daiki, Junichi is also a Kamen Rider, Kamen Rider Glaive (仮面ライダーグレイブ, Kamen Raidā Gureibu), setting up the operation to overthrow Fourteen. However, Junichi was actually a double agent who worked to flush out the last two Kamen Riders of their world until Daiki unknowingly captured him, and as a result, played the role as Fourteen's puppet right hand in charge of the area management committee. However, once Fourteen is destroyed, freeing everyone else from the brainwashing, Junichi reveals the truth with intent to be the next Fourteen. In spite of not being able to kill Daiki, with Tsukasa affirming he still has his free will, Junichi considers his brother dead to him and leaves.

Junichi Kaito is portrayed by Yuuki Kuroda (黒田 勇樹, Kuroda Yūki). Kuroda having previously portrayed a similar character Junichi Shimura in the film Kamen Rider Blade: Missing Ace.

=== Haruka Miwa ===
Haruka Miwa (三輪 春香, Miwa Haruka) is a young woman who resists Fourteen as Kamen Rider Larc (仮面ライダーラルク, Kamen Raidā Raruku). She took part in the operation to overthrow Fourteen and ended up escaping with Shin when the operation was a failure. Since then, she has been on the run from Fourteen's minions. She helps fill Tsukasa in on what is currently happening in her world.

Haruka Miwa is portrayed by Yoko Mitsuya (三津谷 葉子, Mitsuya Yōko). Mitsuya having previously portrayed a similar character Natsumi Miwa in the film Kamen Rider Blade: Missing Ace.

=== Shin Magaki ===
Shin Magaki (禍木 慎, Magaki Shin) is a hot-blooded young man who resists Fourteen as Kamen Rider Lance (仮面ライダーランス, Kamen Raidā Ransu). After the operation to overthrow Fourteen failed due to Daiki's efforts, he escaped with Haruka. He holds a grudge against Daiki for selling out his older brother but eventually forgives him.

Shin Magaki is portrayed by Takao Sugiura (杉浦 太雄, Sugiura Takao). Sugiura having previously portrayed a similar character of the same name in Kamen Rider Blade: Missing Ace.

=== Jashin 14 ===
Jashin 14 (邪神14, Jashin Fōtīn) is leader of the Roaches and ruler of this world, assuming the human-like form of Fourteen (フォーティーン, Fōtīn) for his "ideal peace", turning humans into mindless slaves. He is a massive creature with multiple arms that floats through the air. He is destroyed by Decade in Complete Form with aid from Armed Hibiki, cutting him in half. After his demise, the Roaches vanish and everyone he'd brainwashed were set free.

Fourteen is portrayed by Takashi Ito (伊藤 高史, Itō Takashi).

=== Bossroach ===
Bossroach (ボスローチ, Bosurōchi) is one of the Roach enforcers who watch over the human race, whom he sees to be inferior. Bossroach resembles the Caucasus Undead. Bossroach is then destroyed by Decade Complete Form using Kiva Emperor Form's power.

=== Darkroaches ===
Darkroaches (ダークローチ, Dākurōchi) are Category Unknown Undead who are minions of Fourteen, going after any one who breaks the law. Many of them are killed by the Riders and when their master is destroyed by Decade and Armed Hibiki, the Darkroaches fade away into nothingness.

== World of Shinkenger ==
The World of Shinkenger (シンケンジャーの世界, Shinkenjā no Sekai) is the reality in which the 33rd Super Sentai Series Samurai Sentai Shinkenger takes place. The backdrop used to enter this world resembles the ending credits sequence of Shinkenger, featuring two kuroko opening up a curtain to reveal artistic representations of the five main Origami. Because it is initially a world without Kamen Riders, the World of Shinkenger is not an A.R. World until Chinomanako obtains the DienDriver and transforms, becoming a distortion that threatens the world itself. The storyline takes place after Shinkenger Act (episodes) 20 and during Act 21, with the episodes airing on July 12 and July 19, 2009. Within this world, Tsukasa finds himself as one of the kuroko of the Shiba Household, discarding the guise when the distortion begins. Daiki's treasure in this world is the Ika Origami, which he steals in the teaser at the end of Shinkenger Act 20.

=== The Shinkengers ===
The Shinkengers (シンケンジャー, Shinkenjā) are six young men and women who use a special kanji-based power called Modikara (モヂカラ, Mojikara) to combat the evil Gedoushu as superpowered samurai. They consist of the Shiba Household lord Shinken Red, Takeru Shiba, and his vassals: Shinken Blue, Ryunosuke Ikenami; Shinken Pink, Mako Shiraishi; Shinken Green, Chiaki Tani; Shinken Yellow, Kotoha Hanaori; and Shinken Gold, Genta Umemori. They are accompanied by the Shiba Household's retainer Hikoma Kusakabe and many kuroko.

Tori Matsuzaka (松坂 桃李, Matsuzaka Tōri), Hiroki Aiba (相葉 弘樹, Aiba Hiroki), Rin Takanashi (高梨 臨, Takanashi Rin), Shogo Suzuki (鈴木 勝吾, Suzuki Shōgo), Suzuka Morita (森田 涼花, Morita Suzuka), Keisuke Sohma (相馬 圭祐, Sōma Keisuke), and Goro Ibuki (伊吹 吾郎, Ibuki Gorō), reprises their roles as Takeru Shiba, Ryunosuke Ikenami, Mako Shiraishi, Chiaki Tani, Kotoha Hanaori, Genta Umemori, and Hikoma Kusakabe respectively.

=== The Gedoushu ===
The Gedoushu (外道衆, Gedōshū) are malevolent spirits that dwell in the Sanzu River. They enter the mortal world through gaps to inflict terror on the humans to allow the river to flood over both worlds. Their leading members live aboard the Rokumon Junk (六門船, Rokumonsen) and consist of Doukoku Chimatsuri, Tayu Usukawa and Shitari of the Bones. Under their control are the Ayakashi (アヤカシ) who enter the mortal world, assisted by the Nanashi Company.

Chō (チョー) reprises his voice role as Shitari of the Bones.

=== Chinomanako ===
Chinomanako (チノマナコ; (Note: Chinomanako's name literally translates into "Bloody Eyeball" (血の眼, Chi no Manako). It can be rearranged to translate into "Bloody Sea Cucumber" (血のナマコ, Chi no Namako).)) is an Ayakashi that steals the DienDriver and is able to become Chinomanako Diend (チノマナコ・ディエンド変身態, Chinomanako Diendo Henshintai), the World of Shinkengers' first native Kamen Rider and thus a living distortion that threatens the world. Like Diend, Chinomanako Diend is armed with Kamen Ride Cards as well as Kaijin Ride Cards that allow him to summon the Moose Fangire and the Eagle Undead. He also summons Kamen Rider Blade, which brings to his downfall as Decade uses the Blade Final Form Ride card to turn him into Blade Blade, which Shinken Red wields. While Shinken Pink, Shinken Green and Shinken Gold defeat the Moose Fangire and Shinken Blue, Shinken Yellow and Kamen Rider Kuuga defeat the Eagle Undead, Chinomanako is destroyed by the teamwork of Decade Complete Form and Shinken Red, after being weakened by a combo Royal Straight Flush attack with Blade King Form. As with other Ayakashi being the basis of monsters from Japanese mythology, Chinomanako is the basis of the Mokumokuren (目目連).

Chinomanako is voiced by Ryūzaburō Ōtomo (大友 龍三郎, Ōtomo Ryūzaburō).

== World of Black RX ==
The World of Black RX (BLACK RX(ブラック アールエックス)の世界, Burakku Āru Ekkusu no Sekai) is the version of reality where Kamen Rider Black RX takes place. The backdrop used to arrive in this world features the Crisis Empire's battleship in the background. Within this A.R. World, Tsukasa originally wore a set of clothes that have him mistaken for Joe the Haze (霞のジョー, Kasumi no Jō) by Kotaro and the Crisis Empire. Daiki's treasure in this world is Apollo Geist's Perfecter.

=== Kotaro Minami (Black RX) ===
Kotaro Minami (南 光太郎, Minami Kōtarō) is a man who fights the Crisis Empire as Kamen Rider Black RX (仮面ライダーBLACK RX(ブラック アールエックス), Kamen Raidā Burakku Āru Ekkusu), able to become either Robo Rider (ロボライダー, Robo Raidā), or Bio Rider (バイオライダー, Baio Raidā). However, with Dai-Shocker appearing in his world, he finds himself outmatched by the new monsters while searching for his friend Joe the Haze. Natsumi convinces him that Tsukasa is not the Destroyer of Worlds that he heard about. Though he eventually learns of Joe's fate, Kotaro is not saddened as his friend would be with him in spirit.

Tetsuo Kurata (倉田 てつを, Kurata Tetsuo) portrays the role of Kotaro Minami in the character's World of Black RX incarnation.

=== Schwarian ===
Schwarian (シュバリアン, Shubarian) is a Kaima Robot from the Crisis Empire, seeing himself as the ultimate machine in his branch. He originally turned down Apollo Geist's offer to join Dai-Shocker until he sees his power first hand. He is destroyed by Decade Complete Form with the aid of Agito Shining Form.

Schwarian is voiced by Tetsu Inada (稲田 徹, Inada Tetsu).

=== Chaps ===
Chaps (チャップ, Chappu) are the Crisis Empire's foot soldiers.

=== Dai-Shocker members in the World of RX ===
With Apollo Geist, several kaijin members of Dai-Shocker appear in the World of RX.

- Scorpion Imagin (スコーピオンイマジン, Sukōpion Imajin): An Imagin who accompanies Apollo Geist. Destroyed by Decade using Faiz Axel's power.
- Seamoon Fangire (シームーンファンガイア, Sīmūn Fangaia): A Fangire who accompanies Apollo Geist. Destroyed by Decade using Agito's Rider Kick.
- Mantis Fangire (マンティスファンガイア, Mantisu Fangai): A Fangire who accompanies Apollo Geist. Destroyed by Decade using Faiz Axel's power.
- Sai Mutant (サイ怪人, Sai Kaijin): A mutant of Gorgom. Summoned by Apollo Geist to convince Schwarian to join Dai-Shocker. He is summoned again to help protect Apollo Geist from Black RX, only to be quickly destroyed by Black's Rider Punch.
- Ox Orphnoch (オックスオルフェノク, Okkusu Orufenoku): An Orphnoch. Destroyed by Diend.
- Worm Orphnoch (ワームオルフェノク, Wāmu Orufenoku): An Orphnoch. Destroyed by Diend.
- Frilled Lizard Orphnoch (フリルドリザードオルフェノク, Furirudo Rizādo Orufenoku): An Orphnoch. Destroyed by Diend.
- Brachypelma Worm Aurantium (ブラキペルマワーム・オーランタム, Burakiperuma Wāmu Ōrantamu): A tarantula Worm.
- Brachypelma Worm Viridis (ブラキペルマワーム・ビリディス, Burakiperuma Wāmu Biridisu): A tarantula Worm.
- Tarantes Worm Purpura (タランテスワーム・パープラ, Tarantesu Wāmu Pāpura): A tarantula Worm.

== World of Black ==
The World of Black (BLACK(ブラック)の世界, Burakku no Sekai) is the version of reality where Kamen Rider Black takes place, a parallel world to the World of Black RX. Apollo Geist arrives in this world prior to its RX counterpart, recruiting the cult Gorgom as a result.

=== Kotaro Minami (Black) ===
The World of Black's Kotaro Minami fights the Gorgom as Kamen Rider Black (仮面ライダーBLACK(ブラック), Kamen Raidā Burakku). Unlike his counterpart in the World of Black RX, he is warned of Decade and initially sees him as an enemy. It is not until the interference of Dai-Shocker does he finally consider Decade as an ally, revealing that he has been fighting Dai-Shocker with the aid of Joe the Haze.

Tetsuo Kurata also portrays the role of Kotaro Minami in the character's World of Black incarnation.

== World of Amazon ==
The World of Amazon (アマゾンの世界, Amazon no Sekai) is the version of reality where Kamen Rider Amazon takes place. By the time Decade arrives, he finds the world is under Dai-Shocker's control as they eliminate any resistance. As a result, the people do not trust each other, as they cannot tell who is and who is not aligned with Dai-Shocker. The backdrop used to arrive in this world depicts the Amazon rainforest with Amazon in the middle of it. Within this A.R. World, Tsukasa wears the attire of a baseball player. Daiki's treasure in this world is the GaGa Armlet.

=== Amazon ===
"Amazon" (アマゾン) is a man from the Amazon Rainforest who traveled across the world to find a place that he could call home, eventually arriving in Japan where he fights Geddon as Kamen Rider Amazon (仮面ライダーアマゾン, Kamen Raidā Amazon). Though disillusioned after Masahiko used him to get the GiGi Armlet, Amazon regains his trust in humanity when the boy returns the armlet, finding his place by the Okamura. Afterwards, he aids Decade in battle against Apollo Geist and Llumu Qhimil, forcing Apollo Geist into retreat with his Dai Setsudan and destroying Llumu with his Super Dai Setsudan after Decade equipped him with the GaGa Armlet. His full name is not given in the television series, but is mentioned in Televi-Kun magazine, which his real name was Daisuke Yamamoto (山本 ダイスケ, Yamamoto Daisuke).

Amazon is portrayed by Enrique Sakamoto (坂本 エンリケ, Sakamoto Enrike).

=== Masahiko Okamura ===
Masahiko Okamura (岡村 マサヒコ, Okamura Masahiko) is a 4th grade student whose father died a year prior to Dai-Shocker's arrival, escaping the pain of his father's death by joining the Shocker School that has been established in his world. Because he excels in exposing rebels, Llumu Qhimil uses the boy to find Amazon's hideout. But during the fight, Dai-Shocker's forces turn on him, leading him to take GiGi Armlet from Amazon to get back in Dai-Shocker's good graces. When he is turned in to become the first of Llumu Qhimil's monster conversion project, he realizes that the truth and helps in regaining Amazon's GiGi Armlet and faith in people.

Masahiko Okamura is portrayed by Akashi Takei (武井 証, Takei Akashi).

=== Ritsuko Okamura ===
Ritsuko Okamura (岡村 リツコ, Okamura Ritsuko) is Masahiko's older sister and is a school nurse at the Shocker School. When she discovers that the Hikari Studio group has infiltrated the school, she sends Shocker Combatmen after them, until Masahiko proves to her that the Kamen Riders are not evil.

Ritsuko Okamura is portrayed by Yuki Terada (寺田 有希, Terada Yuki).

=== Dai-Shocker members in the World of Amazon ===
Several kaijin members of Dai-Shocker appear in the World of Amazon.

- Go-Jaraji-Da (ゴ・ジャラジ・ダ, Go Jaraji Da): A porcupine Gurongi. Destroyed when Amazon used his Jaguar Shock on him.
- Propheta Cruentus (プロフェタ・クルエントゥス, Purofeta Kuruentusu): A Mantis Lord, destroyed by Kuuga Titan Form's Calamity Titan attack.
- Camponotus Worm Maxilla (カンポノタスワーム・マキシラ, Kanponotasu Wāmu Makishira): A carpenter ant Worm destroyed by Decade's Dimension Kick.
- Bakeneko (バケネコ): A cat Makamou. Destroyed when Amazon used his Big Slice on him.
- Shocker Combatmen (ショッカー戦闘員, Shokkā Sentōin)
- Shocker Scientists (ショッカー科学者, Shokkā Kagakusha)
- Vigilantes (自警団, Jikeidan): A volunteer military police formed from the residents of the World of Amazon who act in flushing out potential threats.
- Yobuko (ヨブコ): Formerly the Vigilantes' leader who gets transformed into a Makamou as a reward by Llumu Qhimil using the powers of both the GiGi and GaGa armlets on him.

== World of the Rider War ==
The World of the Rider War (ライダー大戦の世界, Raidā Taisen no Sekai) is the iteration of reality where the Rider War takes place and is the reality that is the confluence of the Nine Worlds. The backdrop used to enter this world depicts all nine of the Heisei Riders, the DenLiner, Dragredder, Castle Doran, and Ryokuōzaru rushing at Decade, mirroring the very opening scene of the series. In addition, all of the villains created for Decade make another appearance. Going into the World of the Rider War, the only "worlds" remaining are of Blade's, Kiva's and Hibiki's. Daiki's treasure in this world seems to be the friendship of Tsukasa.

=== Yuki ===
Yuki (ユウキ, Yūki) is the Queen of the Fangires from the World of Kiva. Her true form is the Thorn Fangire (ソーンファンガイア, Sōn Fangaia), whose true name is Perishing at the Altar, Silence from a Deep Kiss (滅びゆく祭壇に、沈黙より深いキスを, Horobiyuku Saidan ni, Chinmoku yori Fukai Kisu o), a sea cucumber Fangire that belongs to the Aqua Class (アクアクラス, Akua Kurasu) Tribe and able to execute her own version of the "Final Zanvat Slash". Though she supports Wataru, Yuki actually sides with Apollo Geist, marrying him to give him immortality so she can have a place in Dai-Shocker. When Tsukasa crashes the wedding, the Thorn Fangire fights him and is killed by Decade Complete Form with Ryuki Survive's power.

Yuki is portrayed by Yuria Haga (芳賀 優里亜, Haga Yuria), having portrayed the similar character Mio Suzuki in Kamen Rider Kiva. She is also known for her role as Mari Sonoda in Kamen Rider 555.

=== World of Kiva Kamen Riders ===
Wataru as Kamen Rider Kiva of the World of Kiva leads these two Kamen Riders in the World of the Rider War, fighting the World of Blade's Kamen Riders.

- Kamen Rider Rising Ixa: Killed by Blade in the initial battle.
- Kamen Rider Saga: Fights in the initial battle and later kills Akira and Todoroki before being killed by Hibiki.

=== Fangires ===
Wataru also leads a group of Fangires (ファンガイア, Fangaia), as their king, in the World of the Rider War. However, they are actually on Dai-Shocker's side.

- Shark Fangire (シャークファンガイア, Shāku Fangaia): Destroyed by Diend.
- Silkmoth Fangire (シルクモスファンガイア, Shirukumosu Fangaia): Destroyed by Diend.
- Horsefly Fangire (ホースフライファンガイア, Hōsufurai Fangaia): Destroyed by Diend.
- Warthog Fangire (ウォートホッグファンガイア, Wōtohoggu Fangaia): Aiding in the fight against the World of Blade, Yuki sics him on Tsukasa when he refuses to aid their side. The Fangire is easily destroyed by Decade in seconds as a result.

=== World of Blade Kamen Riders ===
Kazuma Kendate of the World of Blade leads the two remaining Kamen Riders in the World of the Rider War against the World of Kiva's Riders. When Super Apollo Geist speeds up the convergence of the Nine Worlds, the World of Blade is destroyed, taking all those from it with it.

- Kamen Rider Garren: Appears in the initial skirmish between his world and Kiva's, Garren later shows up with Kazuma when they help Tsukasa fight Apollo Geist.
- Kamen Rider Leangle: Killed in the initial battle by Kiva as revenge for Rising Ixa's death.

=== Undead ===
The Undead (アンデッド, Andeddo) originally from the World of Blade fight alongside the World of Blade's Kamen Riders, fighting against the Fangires in the World of the Rider War. However, they are actually on Dai-Shocker's side.

- Deer Undead (ディアーアンデッド, Diā Andeddo): The Six of Spades Undead, destroyed by Diend.
- Scarab Undead (スカラベアンデッド, Sukarabe Andeddo): The Ten of Spades Undead, destroyed by Diend.
- Lizard Undead (リザードアンデッド, Rizādo Andeddo): The Two of Spades Undead, destroyed by Diend.

=== World of Hibiki Kamen Riders ===
Asumu leads the group of Kamen Riders from the World of Hibiki. With most of the other Oni dead, Asumu worries that all of his friends are dead and he is now alone.

- Kamen Rider Todoroki: Todoroki is killed by Saga when he leads the Fangires in an assault against the World of Hibiki Riders.
- Kamen Rider Amaki: Along with Todoroki, she is killed by Saga when he leads the Fangires in an assault against the World of Hibiki Riders.

=== Nine Worlds' Kaijin ===
To fight Decade, Diend, Kuuga, Kiva, and Hibiki, Super Apollo Geist recreates the following kaijin from the Nine Worlds:

- Phylloxera Worm (フィロキセラワーム, Firokisera Wāmu): Created by combining Worms. The Phylloxera Worm is destroyed by Diend's Blue Strike.
- Tiger Orphnoch (タイガーオルフェノク, Taigā Orufenoku): Created by combining Orphnoch. The Tiger Orphnoch is destroyed by Decade Complete Form's Enhanced Dimension Kick.
- Paradoxa Undead (パラドキサアンデッド, Paradokisa Andeddo): Created by combining Undead. The Paradoxa Undead is destroyed by Kiva.
- Beetle Fangire (ビートルファンガイア, Bītoru Fangaia): Created by combining Fangires. The Beetle Fangire is destroyed by Kuuga's Mighty Kick.
- Buffalo Lord Taurus Ballista (バッファローロード タウルス・バリスタ, Baffarō Rōdo Taurusu Barisuta): Created by combining Lords. The Buffalo Lord is destroyed by Hibiki.
- Alligator Imagin (アリゲーターイマジン, Arigētā Imajin): Created by combining Imagin. The Alligator Imagin is destroyed by Decade Complete Form's Enhanced Dimension Kick.
