= Rio Kanno =

Japanese actress and tarento (born 1993)

- 菅野 莉央
- Pronunciation: Kan'no Rio
- Born: September 25, 1993 (age 32); Saitama Prefecture, Japan
- Occupations: Actress; Tarento
- Years active: 1995-present
- Agent: Amuse, Inc.
- Notable work: Dark Water
- Website: Official website

Rio Kanno (菅野 莉央, Kanno Rio; September 25, 1993) is a Japanese actress, formerly a child actress, and tarento from Saitama Prefecture affiliated with Amuse, Inc.

Kanno graduated from Hosei University Faculty of Sustainability Studies.

== Filmography ==
=== Films ===
Year	Title	Role	Notes	Ref.
2002	Dark Water	Ikuko Matsubara		
2002	Koi ni Utaeba			
2003	Josee, the Tiger and the Fish	Josee (child)		
2004	Yudan Taiteki	Mika Sekikawa (child)		
2004	Crying Out Love in the Center of the World	Ritsuko Fujimura (child)		
2004	Howl's Moving Castle	Madge (voice)		
2005	The Curse	Kana Yano		
2006	Ichiban Kirei Na Mizu	Natsumi Tanimura		
2007	Ten Nights of Dreams – "The Fourth Dream"	Haruka Hinata		
2007	Chacha: Tengai no Onna	Chacha (younger)		
2011	Switch wo Osutoki	Aiko Tahara		
2012	Lesson of the Evil	Yuzuka Takahashi		
2013	Ikenie no Jirenma	Rei Konno		
2016	Stray Dogz 2			
2017	Jin Jin: Hatano Hen			
2020	The Town of Headcounts			
2022	Grown-ups	Usui		
2025	True Beauty: After			

=== TV Drama ===
Year	Title	Role
1997	Shachou ga Kawareba Gakkou mo Kawaru	
1998	Shachou ga Kawareba Gakkou mo Kawaru 2	
1999	Tales Of The Unusual: Autumn Special Edition – "Kimono Girl"	Mysterious girl (Kimono Girl)
1999	Aoi Tori Syndrome	
1999	Rinjin wa Hisoka ni warau – Episode 8	
2000	Wonderful Fear Story 040 – "Distant Promise" Part 1-2	
2000	Ai wo Kudasai – Episode 1-4	
2001	Uchida Shungiku no Renzoku Joyū Satsujin Jiken – Episode 2	
2001	Star no Koi – Episode 4	Chisa Koganei
2002	Tenshi no Utagoe: Shounibyoutou no Kiseki	Yoriko Ogasawara (child)
2002	Yukaza Cinema – "Christmas Promise"	
2003	14 Months – Episode 6-10	Yuko Igarashi (child)
2003	Okusama A	
2004	True Horror Stories Season 2 – "Mojya no Enso"	Natsumi Sonoda
2005-2006	Kaze no Haruka – Episode 1-96	Nanae Kiuchi (child)
2006	Saiyūki – Episode 9	Suika
2007	Byakkotai	Fukiko Saigo
2007	GoGo Sentai Boukenger – Episode 47-49	Leon Giordana
2007	Fūrin Kazan – Episode 8, 26, 36	Miruhime (young)
2007	Joudan Ja Nai!	Seren Hirose
2009	Sakura Michi	Makoto Sato
2009	Kamen Rider Decade – Episode 16-17	Mayu, Sisyra Worm (voice)
2009	Maid Deka – Episode 4	Momoka
2009	Ninkyo Helper – Episode 8	Chika Yamaura
2009	Otomen – Episode 11-12	Iruka Sakiyama
2010	Flunk Punk Rumble	Ayumi Shiota
2010	Team Medical Dragon	Megumi Takase
2011	Zettai Reido – Special	Chan Irene
2011	Erika the Secret Agent	Yukie Doi
2012	Going My Home	Jun Wakaki
2013	Aibō – Season 12	Miku Shouji
2014	Tokyo Tokkyo Kyoka Kyoku	Takeko Tanaka
2014	Last Night's Curry, Tomorrow's Bread	-
2014	Cinderella Date	Saki Shimada
2016	Toto Neechan	Typist
2019	AHS 1984	Ayano Aishi
2021	Reach Beyond the Blue Sky	Ōkura Tokuko
2024	Dear Radiance	Saemon no Naishi
