= Kamen Riders =

Titular characters of the Kamen Rider Series

- Kamen Rider Series characters
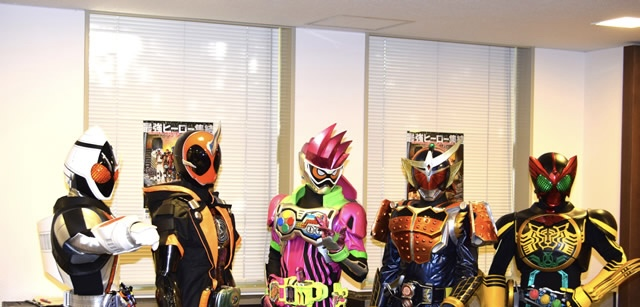
- Five Riders at Japan’s Ministry of Education in 2017 (from left to right: Kamen Riders Fourze, Ghost, Ex-Aid, Gaim and OOO.
- First appearance: "The Eerie Man Spider"; Kamen Rider; 1971
- Created by: Shotaro Ishinomori

The Kamen Riders (Japanese: 仮面ライダー, Hepburn: Kamen Raidā; Masked Riders) are the titular group of fictional superpowered characters that appear in the Kamen Rider Series. They usually take the form of insect-resembling, full-face helmeted individuals who are enhanced by the powers given to them. These powers are accessed by transforming from their day-to-day human guises into their costumed forms.

== Overview ==
=== Definition ===
The exact clauses that classify individuals as Kamen Riders have varied over the franchise's history.

According to the in-universe picture book The Great Path of Alchemy (錬金術の大いなる道, Renkinjutsu no Ōinaru Michi), featured in the 2023 installment Kamen Rider Gotchard, 120 years prior the title was first used by an individual known as the Alchemist of Daybreak, who fought those who became Malgams (the main monsters of the series) by breaking the rules of alchemy. Afterwards the title was given to those who saved lives and whose hearts were as kind as the legendary figure. Generally speaking, many definitions given elsewhere in the franchise state Riders are heroes who protect peace on Earth.

However, several people known as Riders have malicious intent, most of them originating from the Heisei era onwards. As a result, some commentators and producers, including Shin-Ichiro Shirakura, define Kamen Riders by the fact that their powers are in some way connected to the villains they fight. 2012 installment Kamen Rider Wizard expands upon this concept via the Cross of Fire, a belief that every Rider shares this connection. However, as noted in Wizard, some notable Riders have weaker ties to this theory. Nonetheless, according to University of Tokyo researcher Haruka Tsutsui, "Kamen Rider is a being who wanders on the line between enemy creatures and humans, unable to rest comfortably on either side." Others define successive Riders by comparing them to the two "originals", Kamen Rider 1/Takeshi Hongo (仮面ライダー1号, Kamen Raidā Ichi-Gō) and Kamen Rider 2/Hayato Ichimonji (仮面ライダー2号, Kamen Raidā Nigō) respectively. It is perhaps due to these conflicting definitions that conflict has sometimes occurred between multiple, usually heroic Riders.

=== Main powers and abilities ===
Despite debatable definitions of what a Kamen Rider is, almost all of them share a group of abilities they are capable of mastering.

Transformation from civilian form into Rider form is achieved using a Henshin Belt (変身ベルト, Henshin Beruto; or transformation belt, also known as a "Driver"), often used in conjunction with a signature pose and the calling out of Henshin! (変身!, Transform!). Many Riders are also equipped with optional weapons of choice and multiple forms they can alter from. Their main mode of transport, usually a motorcycle, is referred to as a Rider Machine (ライダーマシン, Raidā Mashin).

The most iconic and commonly used finishing move is the Rider Kick (ライダーキック, Raidā Kikku), a dive attack mainly used when an opponent is severely weakened by previous attacks by the Rider, whose kick utilises such strength as to explode them afterwards.

== Riders by era ==
=== Shōwa Riders ===
The Kamen Riders that debuted during the Shōwa period of Japanese history (1926–1989, the Kamen Rider franchise began in 1971), as well as those featuring the involvement of creator Shotaro Ishinomori before his death in 1998, are referred to as Shōwa Riders.

With the exceptions of Kamen Riders X, Amazon, Super-1 and J, their powers were all given to them by the malevolent organisations they eventually fought against, and in the case of the first ten, sometimes referred to as the Ten Veteran Kamen Riders (歴代の１０人ライダー, Rekidai no Jūnin Raidā), applied via cybernetic surgery. Their initial motive for using their powers for good involved avenging those close to them that were killed by their respective enemies, with the initial exception of Hayato Ichimonji/Rider 2, until his battles alongside Hiroshi Tsukuba/Skyrider (スカイライダー, Sukairaidā) to avenge those who were victims of Neoshocker.

The Shōwa Riders’ abilities are all reliant on their Henshin Belts, which rely upon wind energy to ensure transformation. As a result, they perform their signature poses to stimulate the mechanical workings inside the belts, which may also possess alternative weapons. Most of the Riders, following the stimulation, jump into the air to complete the transformation, landing onto higher places to ensure their identities are kept secret. They have also undergone upgrades to their cybernetics, giving them different forms. As well as the main, heroic Riders, the Shōwa era also saw those loyally serving the side of evil, mainly monsters using disguises resembling their opponents.

Due to their unwanted enhanced strength, the Shōwa Riders are at odds with the rest of human society, and have taken a disliking towards the prolonged fighting whenever they are needed, no longer with anyone to avenge or to fight for.

=== Heisei and Reiwa Riders ===
Following Kamen Rider Black RX’s conclusion in 1989, the Kamen Rider franchise went on hiatus (barring the Shin, ZO and J movies) until 2000, two years after Shotaro Ishinomori’s death, with the premiere of Kamen Rider Kuuga. Since then no further hiatus has occurred, allowing the current run of the series to encompass both the Heisei period of Japanese history and the Reiwa period (2019-present).

Due to concern over both occupational discrimination and the growing prominence of technology used in daily life, these Riders’ powers are not given to them via cybernetic surgery. Instead, the sources are either mystical or technological in nature, and usually are not intended for nefarious purposes, but rather are neutral, utilised differently by the heroic protagonists and their opponents. As a result, a lot of the lead villains in the post-Shōwa seasons are classified as Kamen Riders.

Although the initial design of the Henshin Belt was similar to those used by the Shōwa Riders, 2002 installment Kamen Rider Ryuki introduced external devices to be inserted into the belts to enable transformation. When fitted, the name of the device is usually spoken by the belt, which transforms the user without requiring them to engage its mechanisms via poses and jumping into the air. Many Riders’ belts have expanded upon this by combining melodious words, jingles and music, usually ensuring high sales of their toy counterparts. It is also through these belts that the Riders can access their alternative forms.

Ryuki also popularised the idea that, as long as they can successfully use the devices in conjunction with the belts, anyone can become a Kamen Rider. This has led to an increase in evil Riders with unique appearances and sets of abilities, a few eventually reverting to the side of good. Although earlier installments of the Heisei era maintained a lamentation of being a Rider, 2007 installment Kamen Rider Den-O popularised characters’ enjoyment of their status, relishing the idea of Riders being protectors of Earth.

== Rider team-ups ==
Unlike many Western superhero characters such as Batman and Spider-Man, whose original incarnations are frequently rebooted or split into a multiverse, the Kamen Rider franchise revolves around a mostly consistent continuity, allowing for multiple crossovers between Riders of differing installments. These team-ups have led to the formation of multiple sub-groups of Riders within the larger category of them, such as the Ten Veteran Kamen Riders, the Ninja Riders and the Kamen Rider Outsiders. The main protagonists of each installment are grouped under the name All Riders (オールライダー, Ōru Raidā).

All Shōwa era installments are confirmed to take place in the same continuity. Team-ups usually involved the participating Riders fighting the Great Leader (大首領, Daishuryō), a mysterious entity revealed to have been behind most of the organisations they opposed. Some involved the protagonist of the then-current iteration becoming officially recognised as part of the defined group of Kamen Riders.

The early Heisei installments were initially intended to be self-contained and possessed no connection between one another. This ended with the 2008 film Kamen Rider Den-O & Kiva: Climax Deka, which led to Kamen Rider Decade featuring multiple team-ups with alternative reality versions of the Heisei Riders up to that point. Decade’s summer film All Riders vs. Dai-Shocker features every main Heisei Rider, as well as the first appearance of the Shōwa Riders since Kamen Rider Black RX and the debut of Double, the protagonist of Decade’s successor Kamen Rider W. This began a tradition in Kamen Rider summer films to debut the next Rider in a film mostly dedicated to the then-current one.

The Movie War series that began with 2009’s Kamen Rider × Kamen Rider W & Decade: Movie War 2010 connects the different installments broadcast in the 2010s, however 2018 installment Kamen Rider Zi-O reveals that the 20 Heisei Riders each inhabited a separate world, which was temporarily merged to become the World of Kamen Rider (仮面ライダーの世界, Kamen Raidā no Sekai) before being split again.

== List of Kamen Riders ==
=== Main Riders ===
This table refers to each main protagonist of every major installment of the franchise, including those considered part of All Riders.

Rider Name	Real Name	Main Actor	Main Appearance	Other Appearances (Note: Only includes appearances by original actors.)
Kamen Rider 1 (仮面ライダー1号, Kamen Raidā Ichi-Gō)	Takeshi Hongo	Hiroshi Fujioka	Kamen Rider	Kamen Rider V3 Kamen Rider Stronger Heisei Rider vs. Shōwa Rider: Kamen Rider Taisen feat. Super Sentai Kamen Rider 1 Saber + Zenkaiger: Super Hero Senki
Kamen Rider 2 (仮面ライダー2号, Kamen Raidā Nigō)	Hayato Ichimonji	Takeshi Sasaki	Kamen Rider	Kamen Rider V3 Kamen Rider X Kamen Rider Stronger Kamen Rider (Skyrider)
Kamen Rider V3 (仮面ライダーV3, Kamen Raidā Bui-Surī)	Shiro Kazami	Hiroshi Miyauchi	Kamen Rider V3	Kamen Rider X Kamen Rider Stronger Kamen Rider (Skyrider) Birth of the 10th! Kamen Riders All Together!!
Riderman (ライダーマン, Raidāman)	Joji Yuki	Takehisa Yamaguchi	Kamen Rider V3	Kamen Rider Stronger Kamen Rider (Skyrider) Birth of the 10th! Kamen Riders All Together!!
Kamen Rider X (仮面ライダーX, Kamen Raidā Ekkusu)	Keisuke Jin	Ryo Hayami	Kamen Rider X	Kamen Rider Stronger Kamen Rider (Skyrider) Heisei Rider vs. Shōwa Rider: Kamen Rider Taisen feat. Super Sentai
Kamen Rider Amazon (仮面ライダーアマゾン, Kamen Raidā Amazon)	Daisuke Yamamoto	Tōru Okazaki	Kamen Rider Amazon	Kamen Rider Stronger
Kamen Rider Stronger (仮面ライダーストロンガー, Kamen Raidā Sutorongā)	Shigeru Jo	Shigeru Araki	Kamen Rider Stronger	Kamen Rider (Skyrider)
Skyrider (スカイライダー, Sukairaidā)	Hiroshi Tsukuba	Hiroaki Murakami	Kamen Rider (Skyrider)	
Kamen Rider Super-1 (仮面ライダースーパー1, Kamen Raidā Sūpā Wan)	Kazuya Oki	Shunsuke Takasugi	Kamen Rider Super-1	Birth of the 10th! Kamen Riders All Together!!
Kamen Rider ZX (仮面ライダーゼクロス, Kamen Raidā Zekurosu)	Ryo Murasame	Shun Sugata	Birth of the 10th! Kamen Riders All Together!!	Heisei Rider vs. Shōwa Rider: Kamen Rider Taisen feat. Super Sentai Kamen Rider Geats
Kamen Rider Black/Kamen Rider Black RX (仮面ライダーBLACK/仮面ライダーBLACK RX, Kamen Raidā Burakku/Kamen Raidā Burakku Black Āru Ekkusu)	Kohtaro Minami	Tetsuo Kurata	Kamen Rider Black Kamen Rider Black RX	Super Hero Taisen GP: Kamen Rider 3 (Note: Also appears in Kamen Rider Decade as an alternate-universe counterpart.)
Kamen Rider Shin (仮面ライダーシン, Kamen Raidā Shin)	Shin Kazamatsuri	Shin Ishikawa	Shin Kamen Rider: Prologue	
Kamen Rider ZO (仮面ライダーZO, Kamen Raidā Zetto Ō)	Masaru Aso	Kou Domon	Kamen Rider ZO	
Kamen Rider J (仮面ライダーJ, Kamen Raidā Jei)	Koji Segawa	Yūta Mochizuki	Kamen Rider J	
Kamen Rider Kuuga (仮面ライダークウガ, Kamen Raidā Kūga)	Yusuke Godai	Joe Odagiri	Kamen Rider Kuuga	
Kamen Rider Agito (仮面ライダーアギト)	Shoichi Tsugami	Toshiki Kashu	Kamen Rider Agito	Kamen Rider Decade: All Riders vs. Dai-Shocker
Kamen Rider Ryuki (仮面ライダー龍騎)	Shinji Kido	Takamasa Suga	Kamen Rider Ryuki	Kamen Rider Zi-O Kamen Rider Geats + Revice: Movie Battle Royale
Kamen Rider Faiz (仮面ライダー555, Kamen Raidā Faizu)	Takumi Inui	Kento Handa	Kamen Rider 555	Heisei Rider vs. Shōwa Rider: Kamen Rider Taisen feat. Super Sentai Super Hero Taisen GP: Kamen Rider 3 Kamen Rider Zi-O Kamen Rider 555 20th: Paradise Regained
Kamen Rider Blade (仮面ライダー剣, Kamen Raidā Bureido)	Kazuma Kenzaki	Takayuki Tsubaki	Kamen Rider Blade	Kamen Rider Zi-O
Kamen Rider Hibiki (仮面ライダー響鬼)	Hitoshi Hidaka	Shigeki Hosokawa	Kamen Rider Hibiki	
Kamen Rider Kabuto (仮面ライダーカブト)	Souji Tendou	Hiro Mizushima	Kamen Rider Kabuto	
Kamen Rider Den-O (仮面ライダー電王)	Ryotaro Nogami Momotaros	Takeru Satoh Toshihiko Seki	Kamen Rider Den-O	Kamen Rider Den-O & Kiva: Climax Deka Cho Kamen Rider Den-O & Decade Neo Generations: The Onigashima Warship OOO, Den-O, All Riders: Let's Go Kamen Riders Kamen Rider Heisei Generations Forever
Kamen Rider Kiva (仮面ライダーキバ, Kamen Raidā Kiba)	Wataru Kurenai	Kōji Seto	Kamen Rider Kiva	
Kamen Rider Decade (仮面ライダーディケイド, Kamen Raidā Dikeido)	Tsukasa Kadoya	Masahiro Inoue	Kamen Rider Decade	Samurai Sentai Shinkenger Kamen Rider × Kamen Rider W & Decade: Movie War 2010 Kamen Rider × Super Sentai: Super Hero Taisen Heisei Rider vs. Shōwa Rider: Kamen Rider Taisen feat. Super Sentai Kamen Rider Zi-O
Kamen Rider Double (Kamen Raidā Daburu)	Shotaro Hidari/Philip	Renn Kiriyama/Masaki Suda	Kamen Rider W	Kamen Rider × Kamen Rider OOO & W Featuring Skull: Movie War Core OOO, Den-O, All Riders: Let's Go Kamen Riders Kamen Rider × Kamen Rider Fourze & OOO: Movie War Mega Max Heisei Rider vs. Shōwa Rider: Kamen Rider Taisen feat. Super Sentai
Kamen Rider OOO (仮面ライダーOOO, Kamen Raidā Ōzu)	Eiji Hino	Shu Watanabe	Kamen Rider OOO	Kamen Rider × Kamen Rider Fourze & OOO: Movie War Mega Max Kamen Rider × Super Sentai: Super Hero Taisen Kamen Rider × Kamen Rider Wizard & Fourze: Movie War Ultimatum Kamen Rider Heisei Generations Final: Build & Ex-Aid with Legend Rider Kamen Rider Zi-O Kamen Rider OOO 10th: Core Medal of Resurrection
Kamen Rider Fourze (仮面ライダーォーゼ, Kamen Raidā Fōze)	Gentaro Kisaragi	Sota Fukushi	Kamen Rider Fourze	Kamen Rider × Kamen Rider Wizard & Fourze: Movie War Ultimatum Kamen Rider Heisei Generations Final: Build & Ex-Aid with Legend Rider
Kamen Rider Wizard (仮面ライダーウィザード, Kamen Raidā Wizādo)	Haruto Soma	Shunya Shiraishi	Kamen Rider Wizard	Kamen Rider × Kamen Rider Gaim & Wizard: The Fateful Sengoku Movie Battle Heisei Rider vs. Shōwa Rider: Kamen Rider Taisen feat. Super Sentai Kamen Rider Heisei Generations: Dr. Pac-Man vs. Ex-Aid & Ghost with Legend Rider
Kamen Rider Gaim (仮面ライダー鎧武, Kamen Raidā Gaimu)	Kota Kazuraba	Gaku Sano	Kamen Rider Gaim	Kamen Rider × Kamen Rider Drive & Gaim: Movie War Full Throttle Kamen Rider Heisei Generations Final: Build & Ex-Aid with Legend Rider Kamen Rider Zi-O
Kamen Rider Drive (仮面ライダードライブ, Kamen Raidā Doraibu)	Shinnosuke Tomari	Ryoma Takeuchi	Kamen Rider Drive	Kamen Rider × Kamen Rider Ghost & Drive: Super Movie War Genesis Kamen Rider Heisei Generations: Dr. Pac-Man vs. Ex-Aid & Ghost with Legend Rider
Kamen Rider Ghost (仮面ライダーゴースト, Kamen Raidā Gōsuto)	Takeru Tenkūji	Shun Nishime	Kamen Rider Ghost	Doubutsu Sentai Zyuohger Kamen Rider Heisei Generations: Dr. Pac-Man vs. Ex-Aid & Ghost with Legend Rider Kamen Rider Heisei Generations Final: Build & Ex-Aid with Legend Rider Kamen Rider Zi-O
Kamen Rider Ex-Aid (仮面ライダーエグゼイド)	Emu Hojo	Hiroki Iijima	Kamen Rider Ex-Aid	Uchu Sentai Kyuranger Kamen Rider Heisei Generations Final: Build & Ex-Aid with Legend Rider Kamen Rider Zi-O
Kamen Rider Build (仮面ライダービルド, Kamen Raidā Birudo)	Sento Kiryu	Atsuhiro Inukai	Kamen Rider Build	Kamen Rider Zi-O Kamen Rider Heisei Generations Forever
Kamen Rider Zi-O (仮面ライダージオウ, Kamen Raidā Jiō)	Sougo Tokiwa	So Okuno	Kamen Rider Zi-O	Kamen Rider Reiwa: The First Generation Saber + Zenkaiger: Super Hero Senki
Kamen Rider Zero-One (仮面ライダーゼロワン, Kamen Raidā Zerowan)	Aruto Hiden	Fumiya Takahashi	Kamen Rider Zero-One	Saber + Zenkaiger: Super Hero Senki
Kamen Rider Saber (仮面ライダーセイバー, Kamen Raidā Zerowan)	Touma Kamiyama	Shuichiro Naito	Kamen Rider Saber	Kamen Rider: Beyond Generations
Kamen Rider Revice (仮面ライダーリバイス, Kamen Raidā Ribaisu)	Ikki Igarashi Vice	Kentaro Maeda Subaru Kimura	Kamen Rider Revice	Kamen Rider Geats × Revice: Movie Battle Royale
Kamen Rider Geats (仮面ライダーギーツ, Kamen Raidā Gītsu)	Ace Ukiyo	Hideyoshi Kan	Kamen Rider Geats	Kamen Rider The Winter Movie: Gotchard and Geats Strongest Chemy ★ Gotcha Great Operation
Kamen Rider Gotchard (仮面ライダーガッチャード, Kamen Raidā Gatchādo)	Houtaro Ichinose	Junsei Motojima	Kamen Rider Gotchard	
Kamen Rider Gavv (仮面ライダーガヴ, Kamen Raidā Gavu)	Shoma	Hidekazu Chinen	Kamen Rider Gavv	
Kamen Rider ZEZTZ (仮面ライダーゼッツ, Kamen Raidā Zettsu)	Baku Yorozu	Ryutaro Imai	Kamen Rider ZEZTZ	

== See also ==
- Birth of the 10th! Kamen Riders All Together!!, a crossover between the first ten Shōwa Riders in 1984
- Kamen Rider Girls
- Kamen Rider Decade: All Riders vs. Dai-Shocker, a crossover between every main Heisei Rider, the Heisei era debut of the Shōwa Riders, and the debut of succeeding Rider Double in 2009
- The Movie War series, crossing over main Riders from the 2010s onwards
- The Super Hero Taisen series, crossing over Kamen Rider with Toei’s Super Sentai series
