= List of science fiction television programs, K =

This is an inclusive list of science fiction television programs whose names begin with the letter K.

== K ==
Live-action

- Kamen Rider (franchise):
  - Kamen Rider (1971–1973, Japan)
  - Kamen Rider X (1974, Japan)
  - Kamen Rider Amazon (1974–1975, Japan)
  - Kamen Rider Stronger (1975, Japan)
  - Kamen Rider (Skyrider) (1979–1980, Japan)
  - Kamen Rider Super-1 (1980–1981, Japan)
  - Birth of the 10th! Kamen Riders All Together!! (1984, Japan)
  - Kamen Rider Black (1987–1988, Japan)
  - Kamen Rider Black RX (1988–1989, Japan)
  - Kamen Rider Kuuga (2000–2001, Japan)
  - Kamen Rider Agito (2001–2002, Japan)
  - Kamen Rider Ryuki (2002–2003, Japan)
  - Kamen Rider 555 (2003–2004, Japan)
  - Kamen Rider Blade (2004–2005, Japan)
  - Kamen Rider Hibiki (2005–2006, Japan)
  - Kamen Rider Kabuto (2006–2007, Japan)
  - Kamen Rider Den-O (2007–2008, Japan)
  - Kamen Rider Kiva (2008–2009, Japan)
  - Kamen Rider Decade (2009, Japan)
  - Kamen Rider G (2009, Japan, special)
  - Masked Rider (1995–1996, Kamen Rider Black RX US adaptation)
  - Kamen Rider: Dragon Knight (2009, US, adaptation)
  - Kamen Rider W a.k.a. Kamen Rider Double (2009–2010, Japan)
  - Kamen Rider OOO (2010–2011, Japan)
  - Kamen Rider Fourze (2011–2012, Japan)
  - Kamen Rider Wizard (2012–2013, Japan)
  - Kamen Rider Gaim (2013–2014, Japan)
  - Kamen Rider Drive (2014–2015, Japan)
  - Kamen Rider Ghost (2015–2016, Japan)
- Kappatoo (1990, UK)
- Kenny Starfighter (1997, Sweden)
- Kids from OWL, The (1985, New Zealand)
- Killjoys (2015–2019, Canada)
- Kinvig (1981, UK)
- Knight Rider (franchise):
  - Knight Rider (1982–1986)
  - Knight Rider 2000 (1991, film)
  - Knight Rider 2010 (1994, film)
  - Team Knight Rider (1997–1998, Knight Rider 1982 spin-off)
  - Knight Rider (2008, pilot, film)
  - Knight Rider (2008–2009)
- Knights of God (1987, UK)
- Krofft Supershow, The (1976–1978) (franchise):
  - Dr. Shrinker (1976–1977)
  - Electra Woman and Dyna Girl (1976–1977)
- Kyle XY (2006–2009)

Animated

- Kaijudo: Rise of the Duel Masters (2012–2013, animated) (elements of science fiction)
- Kiddy Grade (2002–2003, Japan, animated)
- Kino's Journey (2003, Japan, animated)
- Knights of Sidonia (2014–2015, Japan, animated)
- Kong: The Animated Series (2000–2001, animated) (elements of science fiction)
