= Ryūji Saikachi =

Actor and voice actor

- Born: March 27, 1928; Tokyo, Japan
- Died: September 29, 2017 (aged 89); Tokyo, Japan
- Occupations: Actor, voice actor
- Years active: 1958–2010

Ryūji Saikachi (槐 柳二, Saikachi Ryūji; March 27, 1928 – September 29, 2017) was a Japanese actor and voice actor, known for his roles as Matthew Cuthbert in Anne of Green Gables, Grand Kai in Dragon Ball Z: Fusion Reborn and Mole Beastman in Kamen Rider Amazon.

Saikachi's unique vocal style was developed during military training, where he was quite loud. He considered the role of Mole Beastman to be his favourite.

Saikachi died from congestive heart failure on September 29, 2017.

== Filmography ==
=== Film ===
Year	Title	Role	Notes
1974	Five Riders vs. King Dark	Medusa	Voice only
1979	Galaxy Express 999	Bartender	Voice only
1982	Gauche the Cellist	Concertmaster	Voice only
1983	Harmagedon	Yogin	Voice only
1983	Unico in the Island of Magic	Trojan Horse	Voice only
1985	Night on the Galactic Railroad	Store owner	Voice only
1985	Odin: Photon Sailer Starlight	Froi	Voice only
1986	Castle in the Sky	Old Engineer	Voice only
1987	The Tale of Genji	Old Caretaker	Voice only
1993	Coo: Come from a Distant Ocean	Old Amaku	Voice only
1995	Dragon Ball Z: Fusion Reborn	Grand Kai	Voice only
2003	Tokyo Godfathers	Homeless Man	Voice only

=== Television ===
Year	Title	Role	Notes
1971–1972	Kamen Rider	Man Spider, Semiminga	2 episodes
1973	Kamen Rider V3	Kamakubikame	2 episodes
1974	Kamen Rider X	Medusa, Salamander-Gong	5 episodes
1974–1975	Kamen Rider Amazon	Mole Beastman	16 episodes
1975	Kamen Rider Stronger	Scorpion Kikkaijin	Episode 3 "The Thriller House Calls for Children!"
1975–1976	Ganso Tensai Bakabon	Rerere no Ojisan	14 episodes
1979	Anne of Green Gables	Matthew Cuthbert	43 episodes
1979	Kamen Rider (Skyrider)	Mukadenjin, Sanshojin	2 episodes
1979	Lupin the 3rd Part II	Kozukenosuke Kira	1 episode
1980	The Wonderful Adventures of Nils	Fairy	Episode 1
1981	Kamen Rider Super-1	Cassette Gomoru, Jishakugen	2 episodes
1984	Fist of the North Star	Smith	Episode 2 "The Zankei Death Blow!! Lights Appeared at the End!!"
1987	Tales of Little Women	Henry Murdoch	6 episodes
1989	The Jungle Book	Fergus	Episode 1 "Mowgli Comes to the Jungle: Part 1"
1993	YuYu Hakusho	Dr. Ichigaki	4 episodes
1998	Yu-Gi-Oh!	Daimon	Episode 20
2004	Paranoia Agent	Old Man	6 episodes
