= Kamen Rider (disambiguation) =

Kamen Rider may refer to:

- Kamen Rider, a manga and tokusatsu television franchise, including:
  - Kamen Rider (1971 TV series)
  - Kamen Rider (1979 TV series)
- 12796 Kamenrider, an asteroid named after the series
