= Ryo Hayami =

Japanese actor

Ryo Hayami (速水 亮, Hayami Ryō) (born November 14, 1949 (age 75) in Kimitsu, Chiba, Japan) is a Japanese actor known for playing the hero Keisuke Jin in the tokusatsu superhero series Kamen Rider X. On December 18, 2019, he suffered a heart attack from a collapse. He has been recovering.

== Filmography ==
=== Film ===
- Anata gonomi no (1969) - Young man A
- Gamera vs. Jiger (1970) - Keisuke Sawada
- Osanazuma (1970)
- Five Riders vs. King Dark (1974) - Keisuke Jin / Kamen Rider X
- Utareru mae-ni ute! (1976) - Matsuda Kensaku
- Sengoku jieitai (1979) - Kazumichi Morishita
- Akujo kamakiri (1983) - Takayuki Shimazaki
- Heisei Riders vs. Shōwa Riders: Kamen Rider Taisen feat. Super Sentai (2014) - Keisuke Jin / Kamen Rider X

=== Television ===
- Kamen Rider X (1974) - Keisuke Jin / Kamen Rider X
- Kamen Rider Stronger (1975) - Keisuke Jin / Kamen Rider X
- All Together! Seven Kamen Riders!! (1976) - Keisuke Jin / Kamen Rider X
- Kamen Rider (Skyrider) (1979-1980) - Keisuke Jin / Kamen Rider X
