= Movie War =

The title Movie War is used for Kamen Rider films which feature crossovers between TV series. Each film features characters from the series that is airing at the time and the previous one:

== List of films ==
Film	Kamen Rider Series
Kamen Rider × Kamen Rider W & Decade: Movie War 2010 (2009)	Kamen Rider Decade
Kamen Rider × Kamen Rider W & Decade: Movie War 2010 (2009)	Kamen Rider W
Kamen Rider × Kamen Rider OOO & W Featuring Skull: Movie War Core (2010)	Kamen Rider W
Kamen Rider × Kamen Rider OOO & W Featuring Skull: Movie War Core (2010)	Kamen Rider OOO
Kamen Rider × Kamen Rider Fourze & OOO: Movie War Mega Max (2011)	Kamen Rider OOO
Kamen Rider × Kamen Rider Fourze & OOO: Movie War Mega Max (2011)	Kamen Rider Fourze
Kamen Rider × Kamen Rider Wizard & Fourze: Movie War Ultimatum (2012)	Kamen Rider Fourze
Kamen Rider × Kamen Rider Wizard & Fourze: Movie War Ultimatum (2012)	Kamen Rider Wizard
Kamen Rider × Kamen Rider Gaim & Wizard: The Fateful Sengoku Movie Battle (2013)	Kamen Rider Wizard
Kamen Rider × Kamen Rider Gaim & Wizard: The Fateful Sengoku Movie Battle (2013)	Kamen Rider Gaim
Kamen Rider × Kamen Rider Drive & Gaim: Movie War Full Throttle (2014)	Kamen Rider Gaim
Kamen Rider × Kamen Rider Drive & Gaim: Movie War Full Throttle (2014)	Kamen Rider Drive
Kamen Rider × Kamen Rider Ghost & Drive: Super Movie War Genesis (2015)	Kamen Rider Drive
Kamen Rider × Kamen Rider Ghost & Drive: Super Movie War Genesis (2015)	Kamen Rider Ghost
Kamen Rider Heisei Generations: Dr. Pac-Man vs. Ex-Aid & Ghost with Legend Riders (2016)	Kamen Rider Ghost
Kamen Rider Heisei Generations: Dr. Pac-Man vs. Ex-Aid & Ghost with Legend Riders (2016)	Kamen Rider Ex-Aid
Kamen Rider Heisei Generations Final: Build & Ex-Aid with Legend Rider (2017)	Kamen Rider Ex-Aid
Kamen Rider Heisei Generations Final: Build & Ex-Aid with Legend Rider (2017)	Kamen Rider Build
Kamen Rider Heisei Generations Forever (2018)	Kamen Rider Build
Kamen Rider Heisei Generations Forever (2018)	Kamen Rider Zi-O
Kamen Rider Reiwa: The First Generation (2019)	Kamen Rider Zi-O
Kamen Rider Reiwa: The First Generation (2019)	Kamen Rider Zero-One
Saber + Zenkaiger: Super Hero Senki (2021)	Kamen Rider Zero-One
Saber + Zenkaiger: Super Hero Senki (2021)	Kamen Rider Saber
Kamen Rider: Beyond Generations (2021)	Kamen Rider Saber
Kamen Rider: Beyond Generations (2021)	Kamen Rider Revice
