= Kamen Rider Heisei Generations Forever =

Japanese name
- Kanji: 仮面ライダー平成ジェネレーションズ FOREVER
Transcriptions
- Revised Hepburn: Kamen Raidā Heisei Jenerēshonzu Fōebā
- Directed by: Kyohei Yamaguchi
- Written by: Kento Shimoyama; Yasuko Kobayashi (Supervision of the scenario for Den-O part)
- Based on: Kamen Rider Zi-O by Kento Shimoyama Kamen Rider Build by Shogo Muto
- Starring: So Okuno; Atsuhiro Inukai; Gaku Oshida; Shieri Ohata; Keisuke Watanabe; Eiji Akaso; Kaho Takada; Kouhei Takeda; Kensei Mikami; Nayuta Fukuzaki; Taiyo Saito; Shunsuke Daitō; Takeru Satoh; Toshihiko Seki; Koji Yusa; Masaki Terasoma; Kenichi Suzumura; Kenjirō Ishimaru; Katsuhisa Namase
- Cinematography: Toshikazu Kamiaka
- Edited by: Ren Satō
- Music by: Kenji Kawai; Toshihiko Sahashi
- Production companies: Ishinomori Productions; Toei TV Production Co., Ltd.
- Distributed by: Toei Company
- Release date: December 22, 2018
- Running time: 100 minutes
- Country: Japan
- Language: Japanese
- Box office: $12,587,899

Kamen Rider Heisei Generations Forever (仮面ライダー平成ジェネレーションズ FOREVER, Kamen Raidā Heisei Jenerēshonzu Fōebā) is a 2018 Japanese superhero film in the Movie War line of the Kamen Rider Series. It serves as a crossover between the television series Kamen Rider Zi-O and Kamen Rider Build and is the third film of the Generations series. Aside the casts of Zi-O and Build, the casts of Kamen Rider Den-O and Kamen Rider W also participate, as well as some lead actors from other Kamen Rider Series performing voice-only cameos. The film was released nationally in Japan on December 22, 2018. This is the last Heisei-era Kamen Rider movie, released four months before the 2019 Japanese imperial transition.

== Plot ==
Sougo Tokiwa/Kamen Rider Zi-O and Sento Kiryu/Kamen Rider Build must join forces with all the Kamen Riders of the Heisei era against Tid, a Super Time Jacker who intends to erase the entire history of Heisei Kamen Riders.

== Cast ==
Zi-O cast

- Sougo Tokiwa (常磐 ソウゴ, Tokiwa Sōgo): So Okuno (奥野 壮, Okuno Sō)
- Geiz Myokoin (明光院 ゲイツ, Myōkōin Geitsu): Gaku Oshida (押田 岳, Oshida Gaku)
- Tsukuyomi (ツクヨミ): Shieri Ohata (大幡 しえり, Ōhata Shieri)
- Woz (ウォズ, Wozu): Keisuke Watanabe (渡邊 圭祐, Watanabe Keisuke)
- Junichirō Tokiwa (常磐 順一郎, Tokiwa Jun'ichirō): Katsuhisa Namase (生瀬 勝久, Namase Katsuhisa)
- Owada (小和田): Reo Suzuki (鈴木 励和, Suzuki Reo)
- Classmate: Souryu Nishi (西 蒼竜, Nishi Sōryū)

Build cast

- Sento Kiryu (桐生 戦兎, Kiryū Sento): Atsuhiro Inukai (犬飼 貴丈, Inukai Atsuhiro)
- Ryuga Banjo (万丈 龍我, Banjō Ryūga): Eiji Akaso (赤楚 衛二, Akaso Eiji)a
- Misora Isurugi (石動 美空, Isurugi Misora): Kaho Takada (高田 夏帆, Takada Kaho)
- Kazumi Sawatari (猿渡 一海, Sawatari Kazumi): Kouhei Takeda (武田 航平, Takeda Kōhei)
- Gentoku Himuro (氷室 幻徳, Himuro Gentoku): Kensei Mikami (水上 剣星, Mikami Kensei)

Returning cast

- Ryotaro Nogami (野上 良太郎, Nogami Ryōtarō): Takeru Satoh (佐藤 健, Satō Takeru)
- Owner (オーナー, Ōnā): Kenjirō Ishimaru (石丸 謙二郎, Ishimaru Kenjirō)
- Master of Fuumen (風麺マスター, Fūmen Masutā): Hiroshi Doki (道木 広志, Dōki Hiroshi)

Heisei Generations Forever cast

- Ataru Hisanaga (久永 アタル, Hisanaga Ataru): Nayuta Fukuzaki (福崎 那由他, Fukuzaki Nayuta)
- Shingo Hisanaga (久永 シンゴ, Hisanaga Shingo): Taiyo Saito (斎藤 汰鷹, Saitō Taiyō)
- Tid (ティード, Tīdo): Shunsuke Daitō (大東 駿介, Daitō Shunsuke)
- Ataru's father: Hiroaki Nakagawa (中川 ひろあき, Nakagawa Hiroaki)
- Ataru's mother: Erina Takata (高田 衿奈, Takata Erina)
- Young Ataru: Yuugen Okamoto (岡本 夕弦, Okamoto Yūgen)

=== Voiceover roles ===
- Futaros (フータロス, Fūtarosu): Kenichi Takitō (滝藤 賢一, Takitō Ken'ichi)
- Momotaros (モモタロス, Momotarosu): Toshihiko Seki (関 俊彦, Seki Toshihiko)
- Urataros (ウラタロス, Uratarosu): Kōji Yusa (遊佐 浩二, Yusa Kōji)
- Kintaros (キンタロス, Kintarosu): Masaki Terasoma (てらそま まさき, Terasoma Masaki)
- Ryutaros (リュウタロス, Ryūtarosu): Kenichi Suzumura (鈴村 健一, Suzumura Ken'ichi)
- Another Double (アナザーW(ダブル), Anazā Daburu): Kentarō Itō (伊藤 健太郎, Itō Kentarō)
- Kamen Rider Agito (仮面ライダーアギト, Kamen Raidā Agito): Toshiki Kashu (賀集 利樹, Kashū Toshiki)
- Kamen Rider Ryuki (仮面ライダー龍騎, Kamen Raidā Ryūki): Takamasa Suga (須賀 貴匡, Suga Takamasa)
- Kamen Rider Decade (仮面ライダーディケイド, Kamen Raidā Dikeido): Masahiro Inoue (井上 正大, Inoue Masahiro)
- Kamen Rider Ghost (仮面ライダーゴースト, Kamen Raidā Gōsuto): Shun Nishime (西銘 駿, Nishime Shun)

== Theme song ==
- "Kamen Rider Heisei Generations FOREVER Medley D.A. Re-Build Mix" (仮面ライダー平成ジェネレーションズFOREVER メドレー D.A. RE-BUILD MIX, Kamen Raidā Heisei Jenerēshonzu Fōebā Medorē Dī Ē Ribirudo Mikkusu)
  - Arrangement: Daisuke Asakura

A medley of the opening theme songs from all 20 Heisei Kamen Rider television series from Kamen Rider Kuuga to Kamen Rider Zi-O.

== Reception ==
Kamen Rider Heisei Generations Forever grossed $12,587,899 at the box office.
