= Kamen Rider =

Japanese media franchise

Kamen Rider Series
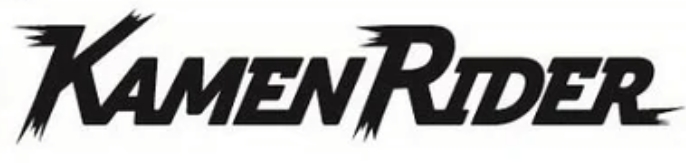
- Created by: Shotaro Ishinomori
- Original work: Kamen Rider
- Owners: Ishimori Production; Toei Company
- Years: 1971–present

Films and television
- Film: See below
- Television series: See below

Games
- Traditional: Rangers Strike
- Video game(s): Kamen Rider Battle: Ganbaride; Kamen Rider: Climax Heroes; All Kamen Rider: Rider Generation; Kamen Rider: Battride War

Audio
- Original music: Rider Chips; Kamen Rider Girls

Official website
- www.kamen-rider-official.com

The Kamen Rider Series (仮面ライダーシリーズ, Kamen Raidā Shirīzu) is a Japanese superhero media franchise consisting of tokusatsu television programs, films, manga, and anime, created by manga artist Shotaro Ishinomori. Kamen Rider media usually revolves around the titular defined group of motorcycle-riding superheroes with an insect motif who fight supervillains, often known as kaijin (怪人; lit. strange person). (Note: The exact definition of Kamen Rider in-universe is varied depending on instalment.)

The franchise began in 1971 with the Kamen Rider television series, which followed college student Takeshi Hongo and his quest to defeat the world-conquering Shocker organization. The original series spawned television and film sequels and launched the Second Kaiju Boom (also known as the Henshin Boom) on Japanese television during the early 1970s, impacting the superhero and action-adventure genres in Japan.

Bandai owns the toy rights to Kamen Rider in Japan and other Asian regions. Bandai Namco Toys and Collectibles America, a subsidiary of Bandai, distributes Kamen Rider merchandise in North America.

== Series overview ==
The entirety of the Kamen Rider franchise revolves around the exploits of the various enhanced superhumans and cyborgs bearing the title of the "Kamen Rider" (仮面ライダー, Kamen Raidā; lit. Masked Rider) and their one-man war against a multitude of opposing enemy factions seeking to take over the world for nefarious intentions, usually an evil organization responsible for their augmentation. Barring a few entries, each series' Rider(s) utilizes a transformation belt commonly known as a "Driver" (ドライバ, Doraiba) to transform into their enhanced Rider form — usually activated with the transformation phrase "Henshin!" (変身, Henshin; lit. Transform) — to fight against various kaijins on a "monster of the week" basis, each armed with a multitude of different combat forms of varying destructive potential and a sizable array of abilities and weapons, with the notable part of their arsenal being their respective "Rider Machines" (ライダーマシン, Raidāmashin) motorcycle to drive around with, though certain entries of the franchise uses other forms of vehicles as substitutes such as Kamen Rider Drive with the "Tridoron" sports car, Kamen Rider Revice uses an hoverbike via one of Kamen Rider Revi and Vice's forms, and Kamen Rider Gavv's titular Rider conjures a candy-themed buggy as a combat vehicle. Typically, a kaijin is usually defeated either through the Kamen Rider's signature weapons or with the "Rider Kick" (ライダーキック, Raidākikku), a powerful flying dive kick only used when the Kamen Rider(s) deemed their enemies weakened enough to be destroyed that would result in an explosive finish.

A recurring theme of the franchise is how any Kamen Rider's powers are derived from a power source and/or technology being used for less noble intentions and the internal turmoil that comes with protecting humanity through violence, as evident by the "tear lines" in the Rider's helmets to represent the agonizing sacrifices made for committing to such a noble cause. Another recurring theme in the franchise is that it portrays how some kaijins, cyborgs and other monstrous beings can also show some degree of humanity to their interaction with mankind, as well as equally portraying how humanity can be ironically seen as radically evil compared to the kaijins and other beings through the various human antagonists of varying maliciousness and cruelty, often displaying their misanthropy towards humanity by becoming monsters themselves. Additionally, unlike its Super Sentai counterpart, most if not all Kamen Riders are morally grey in terms of their respective reasons to fight, usually clashing with other Riders over their ideals and their justifications to accept such power.

Each Kamen Rider series takes place in a standalone continuity within the same universe, the exceptions to this rule being Kamen Rider Decade, Kamen Rider Build, Kamen Rider Zi-O and Kamen Rider Gotchard, with each often crossing over to fight against a common foe in their summer-billed movies taken place somewhere before/after the events of their respective series primarily through the yearly Kamen Rider Movie War (仮面ライダーMOVIE大戦, Kamen raidā mūbī taisen) film series and/or with the Super Sentai franchise through the Super Hero Taisen film series.

== History ==
=== Shōwa era ===
In 1970, Toei producer Toru Hirayama (平山 亨, Hirayama Tōru) proposed a "Masked Hero Project", which he approached Shotaro Ishinomori to provide character designs for. This became Kamen Rider, which premiered on April 3, 1971, initially intended as an adaptation of Ishinomori's Skull Man manga. He and Hirayama redesigned the main character to resemble a grasshopper. The hero Takeshi Hongo/Kamen Rider, played by actor and stuntman Hiroshi Fujioka, was described as a transformed human (改造人間, kaizō ningen) (cyborg). During the filming of episode 10, Fujioka was thrown from his motorcycle during a stunt and broke both legs. Although most staff wanted Takeshi to be killed off, Hirayama opposed it, saying "We can't destroy the children's dreams of being almighty." His character was thus temporarily phased out until the introduction of another transformed human, Hayato Ichimonji/Kamen Rider 2 (played by Takeshi Sasaki) in episode 14. Takeshi (Fujioka) was reintroduced in episode 40, and by episode 53, had fully replaced Hayato's character until the two were united in episodes 72, 73, 93, 94 - and the series finale - episode 98.

The series from April 1971 to January 1976 (Kamen Rider, V3, X, Amazon, Stronger) included a recurring mentor, Tobei Tachibana, and also featured regular team-ups with each protagonist, with the exception of Amazon, with Hirayama stating "I was planning to save it until the next development, so I thought it was not necessary for a while, but the cancellation was decided." After a four-year hiatus following the finale of Kamen Rider Stronger, the series returned to broadcast television in October 1979 for two years with The New Kamen Rider (featuring Skyrider) and Kamen Rider Super-1. This was initiated by Hirayama studying the recent trend in science fiction productions and discussing ideas with fans. In these shows, Tachibana was replaced by a similar character named Genjiro Tani (谷 源次郎, Tani Genjirō). The annual new shows ended briefly during the 1980s, punctuated by the 1984 Kamen Rider ZX special Birth of the 10th! Kamen Riders All Together!! (Hirayama's last project for the franchise).

Kamen Rider Black premiered in 1987, the first series since Amazon not hinting at a relationship to its predecessors. Black was the first show in the franchise with a direct sequel: Kamen Rider Black RX, the basis of Saban's Americanized Masked Rider. In RX's finale, the ten previous Riders returned to help Black RX defeat the Crisis Empire. Kamen Rider Black RX was the final show produced during the Shōwa era, with the franchise resuming production by the end of the 20th century. A manga of Kamen Rider Black was a novelization and reimagination of the Black-RX series' continuity. Absent from television during the 1990s, the franchise was kept alive by stage shows, musical CDs, and the Shin, ZO, and J films.

=== Heisei era ===
==== Phase 1 ====
Toei announced a new project, Kamen Rider Kuuga, in May 1999. Kuuga was part of Ishinomori's 1997 Kamen Rider revival in preparation for its 30th anniversary, but he died before the shows materialized. During the summer of 1999, Kuuga was promoted in magazine advertisements and TV commercials. On January 30, 2000, Kamen Rider Kuuga premiered with newcomer Joe Odagiri. Following Kuuga's 2001 sequel Kamen Rider Agito, the series deviated into a series of unconnected stories starting from Kamen Rider Ryuki in 2002 to Kamen Rider Kabuto in 2006.

In 2005, Kamen Rider: The First was produced. Written by Toshiki Inoue, the film reimagines the manga and original television series and characters from the original series had their storylines altered to fit the film's time span. Masaya Kikawada played Takeshi Hongo/Kamen Rider 1 and Hassei Takano (previously Miyuki Tezuka/Kamen Rider Raia in Kamen Rider Ryuki) was Hayato Ichimonji/Kamen Rider 2. This was followed in 2007 by Kamen Rider The Next, an adaptation of Kamen Rider V3 starring Kazuki Kato (previously Daisuke Kazama/Kamen Rider Drake in Kamen Rider Kabuto) as Shiro Kazami/Kamen Rider V3 and with Kikawada and Takano reprising their roles.

The eighth series, Kamen Rider Den-O, followed in 2007. It differed from past Kamen Rider series with the main protagonist being unsure of himself and uses a large vehicle, the DenLiner: a time traveling bullet train. Although the series has only two riders (Den-O and Zeronos), they have multiple forms similar to Black RX, Kuuga, and Agito. Due to Den-O's popularity, a second film crossover with the 2008 series Kamen Rider Kiva was released on April 12, 2008. The top film in its opening weekend, it grossed ¥730 million. In addition, Animate produced an OVA, Imagin Anime, with SD versions of the Imagin. A third film, Saraba Kamen Rider Den-O: Final Countdown (with two new riders) serves as a series epilogue. According to Takeru Satoh, who played the titular protagonist in the television series and first three films, Den-O was successful because of its humor.

The 2009 series, Kamen Rider Decade, commemorated the Heisei run's 10th anniversary with its protagonist able to assume the forms of his predecessors. Japanese recording artist Gackt performed the series' opening theme, "Journey through the Decade", and the film's theme song ("The Next Decade") and jokingly expressed interest in playing a villain on the show. Also announced in 2009 was a fourth Den-O film (later revealed as the beginning of the Cho-Den-O Series of films), starting with Cho Kamen Rider Den-O & Decade Neo Generations: The Onigashima Warship. In the March 2009 issue of Kindai magazine, Decade star Masahiro Inoue said that the series was scheduled for only 30 episodes.

==== Phase 2 ====
Advertisements in May, June, and July 2009 promoted the debut of Kamen Rider W, who first appeared at the 10th-anniversary Masked Rider Live event and was featured in Kamen Rider Decade: All Riders vs. Dai-Shocker. The staff of W said that they planned to make 10 more years of Kamen Rider, differentiating subsequent series from the Kuuga through Decade period (including a new broadcast season from September of one year to about August of the next). The hero of Kamen Rider W is the first Kamen Rider to transform from two people at once, and the series premiered on September 6, 2009. Continuing into 2010 with Kamen Rider × Kamen Rider W & Decade: Movie War 2010, W ran from September 2009 to September 2010 instead of from January to January. The second, third, and fourth films of the Cho-Den-O series, collectively known as Kamen Rider × Kamen Rider × Kamen Rider The Movie: Cho-Den-O Trilogy, were also released in 2010. Late 2010 brought the series Kamen Rider OOO to television after W's finale, and 2011 observed the 40th anniversary of the franchise. Festivities that year included the Kamen Rider Girls idol group, the film OOO, Den-O, All Riders: Let's Go Kamen Riders (released on April 1) and OOO's successor, Kamen Rider Fourze, which references the previous heroes in its characters' names and its plot. A crossover film, Kamen Rider × Super Sentai: Super Hero Taisen, was released in 2012 featuring the heroes of all Kamen Rider and Super Sentai series to date.

With Fourze's run complete in 2012, Kamen Rider Wizard premiered; its protagonist was the first Kamen Rider to use magic. Wizard additionally had the first homosexual character and cast member with Kaba-chan. Kamen Rider × Super Sentai × Space Sheriff: Super Hero Taisen Z, a sequel to 2012's Super Hero Taisen with the revived Metal Hero Series characters from Space Sheriff Gavan: The Movie and other characters created by Shotaro Ishinomori appearing in Kamen Rider × Kamen Rider Wizard & Fourze: Movie War Ultimatum, was released in 2013.

On May 20, 2013, Toei filed for several trademarks on the phrase Kamen Rider Gaim previewed on July 25, 2013, revealing a Sengoku period and fruit-themed motif to the series' multiple-rival Kamen Riders and Gen Urobuchi as the series' main writer. The third entry in the Super Hero Taisen film series, Heisei Rider vs. Shōwa Rider: Kamen Rider Taisen feat. Super Sentai, marked the 15th anniversary of the Heisei Kamen Rider era and revolved around a conflict between the 15 Heisei Riders and the 15 Showa Riders with Kamen Rider Fifteen, and a cameo appearance by the ToQgers and the Kyoryugers. It also marked the start of a yearly Haruyasumi Gattai Supesharu (春休み合体スペシャル, Spring Break Combined Special) involving each year's Kamen Rider teaming up with the current Super Sentai team in a story tying into that year's entry in the Super Hero Taisen movie series. Gaim was followed in 2014 by Kamen Rider Drive, the first Kamen Rider since Kamen Rider Black RX (who also used a motorcycle), to use a car instead of a motorcycle. The fourth Super Hero Taisen, Super Hero Taisen GP, marks Kamen Rider 3's first live-action appearance after the Showa Kamen Rider manga. Kamen Rider Ghost was introduced in 2015. In 2016 the Kamen Rider series celebrated its 45th anniversary, and Toei released the film Kamen Rider 1 on March 26, 2016. Kamen Rider Ex-Aid was introduced in 2016 and was the first Rider series to have a character, Kiriya Kujo, portray the main Rider's motorcycle. A Movie War film known as Kamen Rider Heisei Generations: Dr. Pac-Man vs. Ex-Aid & Ghost with Legend Riders was announced for December 10, 2016, featuring Bandai Namco Entertainment's original character created by Namco prior to merging with Bandai in 2006, Pac-Man. Following up Ex-Aid's finale, Kamen Rider Build premiered on September 3, 2017. The twentieth and last series of the Heisei era, Kamen Rider Zi-O, which commemorates the 20th anniversary of the Heisei era, premiered on September 2, 2018. On December 22, 2018, a film commemorating all the Riders of the Heisei Era titled Kamen Rider Heisei Generations Forever premiered in Japanese theaters.

=== Reiwa era ===
On May 13, 2019, Toei filed a trademark on the phrase Kamen Rider Zero-One, which premiered on September 1, 2019. It is followed up by Kamen Rider Saber on September 6, 2020, and is later followed by Kamen Rider Revice on September 5, 2021. In commemoration of the 50th anniversary of the Kamen Rider series, Neon Genesis Evangelion director Hideaki Anno was announced as the writer and director of Shin Kamen Rider, a reimagining of the original 1971 series. It was released on March 17, 2023.

The franchise's 4th entry in the Reiwa era is Kamen Rider Geats, which debuted in September 2022 following the finale of Revice. The series would end in 2023, with Kamen Rider Gotchard debuting following the finale as the series of said year. Following Gotchard's finale, Kamen Rider Gavv started airing as 2024's Rider series, later being replaced by Kamen Rider ZEZTZ in September 2025. ZEZTZ marked Toei's first attempts to launch the franchise on a global scale, and was the first Rider series to have an official simulcast release upon launch.

On April 3rd, 2026, Toei held a press conference celebrating the 55th anniversary of the series where they revealed major changes to the production and marketing for the extended franchise, primarily to target global expansion of the series. Moving forward, they are set to release non-mainline series movies under three labels: The Kamen Rider Chronicle will focus on stories revolving around legacy rider characters similar to the series anniversary movies, The Kamen Rider Premium will release high budget blockbuster movies created for theatres, and The Kamen Rider Animated will encompass all animated works with the first project to be coproduced by Aniplex and Shirogumi. At the same press conference, they officially announced the 8th Reiwa entry, Kamen Rider MY-TH.

== Production ==
=== Main series ===
#	Title	No. of Episodes	Broadcast date
Showa Era
1	Kamen Rider	98	April 3, 1971 – February 10, 1973
2	Kamen Rider V3	52	February 17, 1973 – February 9, 1974
3	Kamen Rider X	35	February 16 – October 12, 1974
4	Kamen Rider Amazon	24	October 19, 1974 – March 29, 1975
5	Kamen Rider Stronger	39	April 5 – December 27, 1975
6	Kamen Rider Skyrider	54	October 5, 1979 – October 10, 1980
7	Kamen Rider Super-1	48	October 17, 1980 – October 3, 1981
8	Kamen Rider Black	51	October 4, 1987 – October 9, 1988
9	Kamen Rider Black RX	47	October 23, 1988 – September 24, 1989
Heisei Era Phase 1
10	Kamen Rider Kuuga	49	January 30, 2000 – January 21, 2001
11	Kamen Rider Agito	51	January 28, 2001 – January 27, 2002
12	Kamen Rider Ryuki	50	February 3, 2002 – January 19, 2003
13	Kamen Rider 555	50	January 26, 2003 – January 18, 2004
14	Kamen Rider Blade	49	January 25, 2004 – January 23, 2005
15	Kamen Rider Hibiki	48	January 30, 2005 – January 22, 2006
16	Kamen Rider Kabuto	49	January 29, 2006 – January 21, 2007
17	Kamen Rider Den-O	49	January 28, 2007 – January 20, 2008
18	Kamen Rider Kiva	48	January 27, 2008 – January 18, 2009
19	Kamen Rider Decade	31	January 25 – August 30, 2009
Heisei Era Phase 2
20	Kamen Rider W	49	September 6, 2009 – August 29, 2010
21	Kamen Rider OOO	48	September 5, 2010 – August 28, 2011
22	Kamen Rider Fourze	48	September 4, 2011 – August 26, 2012
23	Kamen Rider Wizard	53	September 2, 2012 – September 29, 2013
24	Kamen Rider Gaim	47	October 6, 2013 – September 28, 2014
25	Kamen Rider Drive	48	October 5, 2014 – September 27, 2015
26	Kamen Rider Ghost	50	October 4, 2015 – September 25, 2016
27	Kamen Rider Ex-Aid	45	October 2, 2016 – August 27, 2017
28	Kamen Rider Build	49	September 3, 2017 – August 26, 2018
29	Kamen Rider Zi-O	49	September 2, 2018 – August 25, 2019
Reiwa Era
30	Kamen Rider Zero-One	45	September 1, 2019 – August 30, 2020
31	Kamen Rider Saber	47	September 6, 2020 – August 29, 2021
32	Kamen Rider Revice	50	September 5, 2021 – August 28, 2022
33	Kamen Rider Geats	49	September 4, 2022 – August 27, 2023
34	Kamen Rider Gotchard	50	September 3, 2023 – August 25, 2024
35	Kamen Rider Gavv	50	September 1, 2024 – August 31, 2025
36	Kamen Rider ZEZTZ	50	September 7, 2025 – August 30, 2026
37	Kamen Rider MY-TH	TBA	September 6, 2026

=== Television specials ===
- 1976: All Together! Seven Kamen Riders!!
- 1979: Immortal Kamen Rider Special
- 1984: Birth of the 10th! Kamen Riders All Together!!
- 1987: This Is Kamen Rider Black
- 1988: Kamen Rider 1 through RX: Big Gathering
- 1993: Ultraman vs. Kamen Rider
- 2000: Kamen Rider Kuuga: First Dream Of The New Year
- 2001: Kamen Rider Agito Special: Another New Transformation
- 2002: Kamen Rider Ryuki Special: 13 Riders
- 2004: Kamen Rider Blade: New Generation
- 2006: 35th Masked Rider Anniversary File
- 2009: Kamen Rider G

=== Theatrical releases ===
- 1971: Go Go Kamen Rider (Movie version of episode 13)
- 1972: Kamen Rider vs. Shocker
- 1972: Kamen Rider vs. Ambassador Hell
- 1973: Kamen Rider V3 (Movie version of episode 2)
- 1973: Kamen Rider V3 vs. the Destron Monsters
- 1974: Kamen Rider X (Movie version of episode 3)
- 1974: Kamen Rider X: Five Riders vs. King Dark
- 1975: Kamen Rider Amazon (Movie version of episode 16)
- 1975: Kamen Rider Stronger (Movie version of episode 7)
- 1980: Kamen Rider: Eight Riders vs. Galaxy King
- 1981: Kamen Rider Super-1
- 1988: Kamen Rider Black: Hurry to Onigashima
- 1988: Kamen Rider Black: Fear! Evil Monster Mansion
- 1989: Kamen Rider: Stay in the World – 3D theme park special
- 1992: Shin Kamen Rider: Prologue
- 1993: Kamen Rider ZO
- 1994: Kamen Rider J
- 1994: Kamen Rider World – 3-D theme park special
- 2001: Kamen Rider Agito: Project G4
- 2002: Kamen Rider Ryuki: Episode Final
- 2003: Kamen Rider 555: Paradise Lost
- 2004: Kamen Rider Blade: Missing Ace
- 2005: Kamen Rider Hibiki & The Seven Senki
- 2005: Kamen Rider: The First
- 2006: Kamen Rider Kabuto: God Speed Love
- 2007: Kamen Rider Den-O: I'm Born!
- 2007: Kamen Rider: The Next
- 2008: Kamen Rider Den-O & Kiva: Climax Deka
- 2008: Kamen Rider Kiva: King of the Castle in the Demon World
- 2008: Saraba Kamen Rider Den-O: Final Countdown
- 2009: Cho Kamen Rider Den-O & Decade Neo Generations: The Onigashima Warship
- 2009: Kamen Rider Decade: All Riders vs. Dai-Shocker
- 2009: Kamen Rider × Kamen Rider W & Decade: Movie War 2010
  - Kamen Rider Decade: The Last Story
  - Kamen Rider W: Begins Night
  - Movie War 2010
- 2010: Kamen Rider × Kamen Rider × Kamen Rider The Movie: Cho-Den-O Trilogy
  - Episode Red: Zero no Star Twinkle
  - Episode Blue: The Dispatched Imagin is Newtral
  - Episode Yellow: Treasure de End Pirates
- 2010: Kamen Rider W Forever: A to Z/The Gaia Memories of Fate
- 2010: Kamen Rider × Kamen Rider OOO & W Featuring Skull: Movie War Core
  - Kamen Rider Skull: Message for Double
  - Kamen Rider OOO: Nobunaga's Desire
  - Movie War Core
- 2011: OOO, Den-O, All Riders: Let's Go Kamen Riders
- 2011: Kamen Rider OOO Wonderful: The Shogun and the 21 Core Medals
- 2011: Kamen Rider × Kamen Rider Fourze & OOO: Movie War Mega Max
  - Beginning: Fight! Legendary Seven Riders
  - Kamen Rider OOO: Ankh's Resurrection, the Medals of the Future, and the Leading Hope
  - Futo, The Conspiracy Advances: Gallant! Kamen Rider Joker
  - Kamen Rider Fourze: Nade-Shiko Ad-Vent
  - Movie War Mega Max: Gather! Warriors of Glory
- 2012: Kamen Rider × Super Sentai: Super Hero Taisen
- 2012: Kamen Rider Fourze the Movie: Space, Here We Come!
- 2012: Kamen Rider × Kamen Rider Wizard & Fourze: Movie War Ultimatum
  - Kamen Rider Fourze
  - Kamen Rider Wizard
  - Movie War Ultimatum
- 2013: Kamen Rider × Super Sentai × Space Sheriff: Super Hero Taisen Z
- 2013: Kamen Rider Wizard in Magic Land
- 2013: Kamen Rider × Kamen Rider Gaim & Wizard: The Fateful Sengoku Movie Battle
  - Kamen Rider Wizard: The Promised Place
  - Kamen Rider Gaim: Sengoku Battle Royale
- 2014: Heisei Riders vs. Shōwa Riders: Kamen Rider Taisen feat. Super Sentai
- 2014: Kamen Rider Gaim: Great Soccer Battle! Golden Fruits Cup!
- 2014: Kamen Rider × Kamen Rider Drive & Gaim: Movie War Full Throttle
  - Kamen Rider Gaim: The Advancing Last Stage
  - Kamen Rider Drive: A Challenge from Lupin
  - Movie War Full Throttle
- 2015: Super Hero Taisen GP: Kamen Rider 3
- 2015: Kamen Rider Drive: Surprise Future
- 2015: Kamen Rider × Kamen Rider Ghost & Drive: Super Movie War Genesis
- 2016: Kamen Rider 1
- 2016: Kamen Rider Ghost: The 100 Eyecons and Ghost's Fated Moment
- 2016: Kamen Rider Heisei Generations: Dr. Pac-Man vs. Ex-Aid & Ghost with Legend Riders
- 2017: Kamen Rider × Super Sentai: Ultra Super Hero Taisen
- 2017: Kamen Rider Ex-Aid the Movie: True Ending
- 2017: Kamen Rider Heisei Generations Final: Build & Ex-Aid with Legend Rider
- 2018: Kamen Rider Amazons the Movie: The Last Judgement
- 2018: Kamen Rider Build the Movie: Be the One
- 2018: Kamen Rider Heisei Generations Forever
- 2019: Kamen Rider Zi-O the Movie: Over Quartzer
- 2019: Kamen Rider Reiwa: The First Generation
- 2020: Kamen Rider Zero-One the Movie: Real×Time
- 2020: Kamen Rider Saber Theatrical Short Story: The Phoenix Swordsman and the Book of Ruin
- 2021: Saber + Zenkaiger: Super Hero Senki
- 2021: Kamen Rider Revice (short film)
- 2021: Kamen Rider Beyond Generations
- 2022: Kamen Rider Revice the Movie: Battle Familia
- 2022: Kamen Rider Geats × Revice: Movie Battle Royale
- 2023: Shin Kamen Rider
- 2023: Kamen Rider Geats the Movie: 4 Aces and the Black Fox
- 2023: Kamen Rider the Winter Movie: Gotchard & Geats Strongest Chemy ★ Gotcha Great Operation
- 2024: Kamen Rider Gotchard: The Future Daybreak
- 2025: Kamen Rider Gavv: Invaders of the House of Snacks
- 2026: Agito: Psychic War
- 2026: Kamen Rider ZEZTZ: Farewell Mission

=== V-Cinema releases ===
- 1992: Shin Kamen Rider: Prologue
- 1993: Kamen Rider SD – Only anime adaptation
- 2011: Kamen Rider W Returns
  - Kamen Rider Accel Chapter
  - Kamen Rider Eternal Chapter
- 2015: Kamen Rider Gaim Gaiden
  - First Part
    - Kamen Rider Zangetsu Chapter
    - Kamen Rider Baron Chapter
  - Second Part
    - Kamen Rider Duke Chapter
    - Kamen Rider Knuckle Chapter
  - Third Part
    - Kamen Rider Zangetsu Chapter (Stage Show 2019)
    - Kamen Rider Gridon VS Kamen Rider Bravo Chapter (2 Special 2020)
- 2016: Kamen Rider Drive Saga
  - First Part
    - Kamen Rider Chaser Chapter
  - Second Part
    - Kamen Rider Heart Chapter
    - Kamen Rider Mach Chapter
  - Third Part
    - Kamen Rider Brain Chapter (2 Special 2019)
- 2017: Kamen Rider Ghost Re-Birth: Kamen Rider Specter
- 2018: Kamen Rider Ex-Aid Trilogy: Another Ending
  - First Part
  - Brave & Snipe Chapter
  - Second Part
  - Para-DX with Poppy Chapter
  - Third Part
  - Genm vs. Lazer Chapter
- 2019: Kamen Rider Build New World
  - First Part
    - Kamen Rider Cross-Z Chapter
  - Second Part
    - Kamen Rider Grease Chapter
- 2020: Kamen Rider Zi-O Next Time
  - Kamen Rider Geiz Majesty Chapter
- 2021: Kamen Rider Zero-One Others
  - First Part
  - Kamen Rider Metsuboujinrai Chapter
  - Second Part
  - Kamen Rider Vulcan & Valkyrie Chapter
- 2022: Kamen Rider Saber: Trio of Deep Sin
- 2022: Kamen Rider OOO 10th: Core Medal of Resurrection
- 2023: Revice Forward: Kamen Rider Live & Evil & Demons
- 2024: Kamen Rider 555 20th: Paradise Regained
- 2024: Kamen Rider Geats: Jyamato Awaking
- 2025: Kamen Rider Gotchard: Graduations
- 2025: Kamen Rider Gavv: Guilty Parfait
- 2026: Kamen Rider Kabuto 20th: Inheritor of Heaven

=== Hyper Battle videos ===
- 2000: Kamen Rider Kuuga: vs. the Strong Monster Go-Jiino-Da
- 2001: Kamen Rider Agito: Three rider TV-kun Special
- 2002: Kamen Rider Ryuki Hyper Battle: Kamen Rider Ryuki vs. Kamen Rider Agito
- 2003: Kamen Rider 555: The Musical
- 2004: Kamen Rider Blade: Blade vs Blade
- 2005: Kamen Rider Hibiki: Transform Asumu: You can be an Oni too
- 2006: Kamen Rider Kabuto: Birth! Gatack Hyper Form!
- 2007: Kamen Rider Den-O: Singing, Dancing, Great Time!!
- 2008: Kamen Rider Kiva: You Can Also be Kiva
- 2009: Kamen Rider Decade: Protect! The World of TV-Kun
- 2010: Kamen Rider W: Donburi's α/Farewell Recipe of Love
- 2011: Kamen Rider OOO: Quiz, Dance, and Takagarooba!?
- 2012: Kamen Rider Fourze: Rocket Drill States of Friendship
- 2013: Kamen Rider Wizard: Showtime with the Dance Ring
- 2014: Kamen Rider Gaim: Fresh Orange Arms is Born!
- 2015: Kamen Rider Drive Hyper Battle:
  - Type TV-KUN: Hunter & Monster! Chase the Mystery of the Super Thief!
  - Type High Speed! The True Power! Type High Speed is Born!
- 2016: Kamen Rider Ghost Hyper Battle:
  - Ikkyu Eyecon Contention! Quick Wit Battle!!
  - Ikkyu Eyecon! Awaken, My Quick Wit Power!!
  - Truth! The Secret Of Heroes' Eyecons!
- 2017: Kamen Rider Ex-Aid "Tricks"
  - Kamen Rider Lazer
  - Kamen Rider Para-DX
- 2018: Kamen Rider Build Hyper Battle:
  - Birth! KumaTelevi!! VS Kamen Rider Grease!
  - Kamen Rider Prime Rogue
- 2019: Kamen Rider ZI-O: Kamen Rider Bi Bi Bi no Bibill Geiz
- 2019: Kamen Rider Zero-One: What Will Pop Out of the Kangaroo? Think About It by Yourself! Yes! It must be me, Aruto!
- 2021: Kamen Rider Saber: Gather! Hero! The Explosive Dragon TVKun
- 2022: Kamen Rider Revice Hyper Battle:
  - Koala VS Kangaroo!! Do you want to avoid love at the wedding?!
  - Becoming Rider 2♪
- 2023: Kamen Rider Geats: How Is It!? Desire Grand Prix Filled With Men, I Am Ouja!!
- 2024: Kamen Rider Gotchard: What's That!? Houtaro and Rinne Swapped Bodies!!
- 2025: Kamen Rider Gavv: Gourmet Snacks and Woo!-mai Wakamen!!
- 2026: Kamen Rider ZEZTZ: Send 'Em Flying! Giant Robot CODE Zeroider!!

=== Anime exclusive ===
- 2008: Imagin Anime
- 2020: Kamen Rider Zero-One Short Anime: Everyone's Daily Life
- 2021: Separate Volume Kamen Rider Saber: Short Animation Collection
- 2022–2023: Shocker During the Day
- 2022–2023: Boiling Up and Feeling Great! Revice Anime: Steam Paradise a Go! Go!
- 2023–2024: Geats Anime: Another Grand Prix
- 2024: Gotchard Short Anime GotchAnime: Get Furasu High School's Seven Mysteries!
- 2025: Gavv Anime! Sweety Days: Strange Everyday Life
- 2025–2026: ZEZTZ Anime: Dream Part-Timer Baku

=== Web exclusive ===
- 2015: D-Video Special: Kamen Rider 4
- 2016: Kamen Rider Ghost: Legendary! Riders' Souls!
- 2016–2017: Kamen Rider Amazons
- 2017: Kamen Sentai Gorider
- 2018: Kamen Rider Build: Raising the Hazard Level ~7 Best Matches~
- 2019: Rider Time
  - Rider Time: Kamen Rider Shinobi
  - Rider Time: Kamen Rider Ryuki
  - Rider Time: Kamen Rider Zi-O VS Decade -7 of Zi-O!-
  - Rider Time: Kamen Rider Decade VS Zi-O -Decade Mansion's Death Game-
- 2020: Kamen Rider Saber Spin Off: Swordsmen Chronicles
- 2021: Kamen Rider Genms -The Presidents-
- 2021: Kamen Rider Saber × Ghost
- 2021: Kamen Rider Specter × Blades
- 2022: Kamen Rider Revice: The Mystery
- 2022: Kamen Rider OOO Net Movie
  - Core Medal of Resurrection Prologue
  - Birth X Birth Prologue
- 2022: Kamen Rider Genms -Smart Brain and the 1000% Crisis-
- 2022: Revice Legacy: Kamen Rider Vail
- 2022: OOO 10th Kamen Rider Birth: Birth X Secret Birth Story
- 2022: Girls Remix
  - Kamen Rider Jeanne & Kamen Rider Aguilera with Girls Remix
  - Kamen Rider Majade with Girls Remix
  - Girls Remix in Halloween Party
  - Kamen Rider Eins with Girls Remix
- 2022–2024: Kamen Rider Outsiders
- 2022: Kamen Rider Black Sun
- 2023: Kamen Rider Juuga VS Kamen Rider Orteca
- 2023: Geats Extra
  - Geats Extra: Kamen Rider PunkJack
  - Geats Extra: Kamen Rider Tycoon Meets Kamen Rider Shinobi
  - Geats Extra: Kamen Rider Gazer
- 2023: Kamen Rider Gotchard VS Kamen Rider Legend
- 2024: Kamen Rider 555: Murder Case
- 2025–2026: Gochizo Party
- 2025–2026: Kamen Rider ZEZTZ: Series of Sister's Substory: Agent Minami

=== Others ===
- 2016: The Legend of Hero Alain
- 2017: Kamen Rider Snipe: Episode ZERO
- 2018: ROGUE
- 2020: Project Thouser
- 2020: TTFC Direct Theater: Kamen Rider Saber
- 2021: Kamen Rider Saber Spin-Off: Sword of Logos Saga
- 2022: TTFC Direct Theater: Kamen Rider Revice
- 2022: DEAR GAGA
- 2022: Fuuto PI
- 2023: Desire Grand Prix Bonus Stage
- 2023: Jack-of-All-Trades!? Boss Micchy's Day
- 2024: We Are Class 3G
- 2025–2026: Tojima Wants to Be a Kamen Rider

== Distribution and overseas adaptations ==
Although the Kamen Rider series originated in Japan, various Kamen Rider series have been imported and dubbed into other languages for broadcast in several other countries.

=== Hong Kong ===
Between 2001 and 2012, Omni Productions in Hong Kong dubbed several Kamen Rider shows.

=== Taiwan ===
Between 1975 and 1976, Tong Hsing Film Co., Ltd. in Taiwan produced the Super Riders series based on the Japanese version.

- 1975: The Super Rider V3 based on Kamen Rider V3
- 1976: The Five Of Super Rider based on Kamen Rider X
- 1976: The Super Riders based on Kamen Rider vs. Shocker and Kamen Rider vs. Hell Ambassador

=== Unofficial Thailand adaptation ===
In 1975, Chaiyo Productions made an unofficial Kamen Rider movie entitled Hanuman and the Five Riders, which used original footage of Chaiyo's Hanuman character, spliced with footage from the Five Riders Vs. King Dark movie. However, Chaiyo went ahead with the production without authorisation after Toei denied them permission to make an official movie with them, putting the legality of the movie into question.

=== United States ===
In 1995, Saban produced the first American Masked Rider, which was adapted from Kamen Rider Black RX, the series after its success adapting Super Sentai into Power Rangers and the Metal Hero Series (VR Troopers and Beetleborgs). Unfortunately, the show was panned by critics and fans from the series, and it only lasted one 40-episode season, with the first 27 debuting on Fox Kids, while the other 13 debuted in syndication.

In 2009, a new series, produced by Michael and Steve Wang, was broadcast: Kamen Rider: Dragon Knight, which was adapted from Kamen Rider Ryuki. Although it was canceled before finishing its syndicated run, it won the first Daytime Emmy for Outstanding Stunt Coordination at the 37th Daytime Emmy Awards.

In 2020, Shout! Factory made the entire series available to stream in North America.

In 2025, Shout! Studios announced that Kamen Rider Zeztz would be simulcasted on the TokuSHOUTsu YouTube channel.

== Merchandise ==
As of March 2021, Bandai Namco has sold 14.50 million Kamen Rider transformation belts since February 2000.

== Homages and parodies ==
The Kamen Rider franchise has been parodied in and outside Japan. One parody is of the Kamen Rider henshin (metamorphosis) pose.

In video games, Skullomania (from Street Fighter EX) and May Lee (from The King of Fighters) are examples of Kamen Rider parodies. The titular protagonist of the Viewtiful Joe game series is modeled after the heroes of Kamen Rider and other tokusatsu series of the 1960s and 1970s, according to character designer Kumiko Suekane. In the Pokémon franchise, the grasshopper-based Pokémon known as Lokix appears to take inspiration from the heroes of the Kamen Rider series, further evidenced by the original Kamen Rider's grasshopper motif (which is also shared with other primary Riders).

In anime, examples include Fair, then Partly Piggy, My-HiME (and its sequel, My Otome), Dragon Ball Z, Bleach, and Franken Fran. In the Crayon Shin-chan series, the title character interacts with Kamen Riders in crossover specials. Case Closed has a recurring TV series the detective boys like to watch, Kamen Yaiba. In One-Punch Man, the C-Class Hero Mumen Rider is a parody, being an ordinary man in a world of superhuman beings, riding a bicycle rather than a motorcycle. However, despite his weakness, he is extremely heroic and his actions counter his parodic character conception. The series has also been parodied and homaged in the Disney Channel series Amphibia, referencing Kamen Rider 1, Kamen Rider Kuuga, and Riderman from Kamen Rider V3.

In live-action, parodies include "Kamen Renaider" by SMAP's Takuya Kimura and Shingo Katori, a parody of Ryuki; "Kamen Zaiber", a parody of the original series; "Kamen Norider" by the Tunnels, a parody of Kamen Rider 1 and as well as the first series; "Kamen Rider HG", Hard Gay's parody of the original for a Japanese TV show, and "Ridermen" (a short skit with a man called Ridermen, a parody of the Riderman on the set of Kamen Rider Kuuga.

Akimasa Nakamura, a Japanese astronomer named two minor planets in honor of the series: 12408 Fujioka for actor Hiroshi Fujioka, known for his portrayal of Takeshi Hongo/Kamen Rider 1, and 12796 Kamenrider for the series itself.
