= Kamen Rider Amazon =

Japanese television series

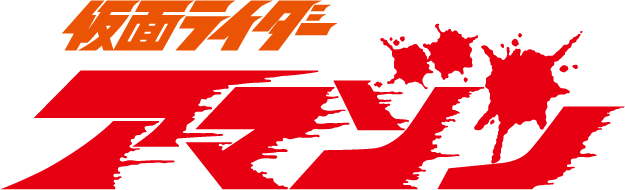
- Genre: Tokusatsu; Superhero fiction Science fiction Action/Adventure; Fantasy, Horror
- Created by: Shotaro Ishinomori
- Developed by: Isao Daimon
- Directed by: Masahiro Tsukada
- Starring: Tōru Okazaki; Akiji Kobayashi; Mariko Matsuoka; Yoji Matsuda; Hirohisa Nakata
- Narrated by: Gorō Naya
- Opening theme: "Amazon Rider is Here"
- Ending theme: "Amazon Da-Da-Da!!"
- Composer: Shunsuke Kikuchi
- Country of origin: Japan
- No. of episodes: 24

Production
- Running time: 25 minutes
- Production companies: Mainichi Broadcasting System; Toei Company

Original release
- Network: ANN (MBS, NET)
- Release: October 19, 1974 – March 29, 1975

Related
- Kamen Rider X; Kamen Rider Stronger

Kamen Rider Amazon (仮面ライダーアマゾン, Kamen Raidā Amazon) is a Japanese tokusatsu, horror, adventure television series. The fourth installment to be produced as part of the Kamen Rider Series, the series aired in Japan from late 1974 to early 1975 on the NET and Mainichi Broadcasting System. Unlike preceding Kamen Riders who were based on grasshoppers, the character of Kamen Rider Amazon was based on a komodo dragon or other large lizard.

It was the shortest Kamen Rider series ever, lasting only 24 episodes. While this was believed to be due to the show's heavy amounts of graphic violence, in reality, this was due to a pre-planned changeover between networks airing the program, from NET and its ANN network to Tokyo Broadcasting System and its JNN network. This was a result of ABC switching to the former and MBS switching to the latter, which requested a clean break in airing series, thus resulting in a pre-planned end at episode 24. Its timeslot on NET was taken over by Himitsu Sentai Gorenger a week after its finale aired.

== Plot summary ==
A plane crashes in the Amazon rainforest, leaving young Daisuke Yamamoto stranded without his parents. Soon adopted by an Incan tribe under the name "Amazon", he becomes a wild child, living off the land.

However, his village is massacred by the Ten-Faced Demon Gorgos, who searches for the powerful GiGi Armlet to take over the world with it. The last Inca, Elder Bago, gives Amazon the GiGi Armlet for safekeeping and uses his knowledge of Incan science and magic to perform a mystic ritual on Amazon and transform him into the powerful "Kamen Rider Amazon" before dying.

Later in Japan, Amazon battles the evil organization Gedon, unaware of why they pursue him. Befriending Professor Kousaka's nephew and niece, Amazon learns of the GiGi Armlet's true nature and ultimately defeats Gedon, then the Garanda Empire.

== Characters ==
- Amazon (Daisuke Yamamoto)/Kamen Rider Amazon (アマゾン（山本 大介）／仮面ライダーアマゾン, Amazon (Yamamoto Daisuke)/Kamen Raidā Amazon)
- Tobei Tachibana (立花 藤兵衛, Tachibana Tōbei): Ally of the original Kamen Riders. Motorbike specialist. He helps Daisuke settle in Japan.
- Masahiko Okamura (岡村 まさひこ, Okamura Masahiko): The nephew of professor Kōsaka and Daisuke's first friend in Japan, helping him in any way he can. At the end of Episode 12, Masahiko begins teaching Amazon to speak coherent Japanese. Masahiko attends Jonan Elementary School.
- Ritsuko Okamura (岡村 りつ子, Okamura Ritsuko): Masahiko's big sister. At first she doesn't trust Daisuke due to bringing Gedon to Japan and causing chaos. After being constantly rescued and helped by Daisuke she puts her faith and trust in him.
- Mole Beastman (モグラ獣人, Mogura Jūjin): A mole-like monster, nicknamed "Mogura", able to burrow underground and prone to chanting "chu-chu". The Mole Beastman was originally working for Gedon and was sent after Daisuke only to fall back due to police interference. After getting a chance to redeem himself, The Mole Beastman goes after Masahiko to set a trap for Daisuke which ended up with his arm dislocated and many other injuries before he escaped. As a result, the Mole Beastman gets exiled to the surface and chained up to die of sun stroke. Daisuke, taking pity on the monster, rescues him from his cruel fate. Though confused why, The Mole Beastman becomes Daisuke's recurring ally until Garanda's Tokyo Mold Destruction Operation, where he faked offering his services to Garanda to take mold. However, the Mushroom Beastman expected it and poisoned the Mole Beastman, living long enough to make his way to the doctor, but too late to be saved by the newly developed antidote. Soon after avenging him, Daisuke builds a memorial in the Mole Beastman's honor.
- Elder Bago (長老バゴー, Chōrō Bagō): The chief of the Incas who bestowed the GiGi Armlet to Daisuke before he died.
- Professor Kōsaka (高坂教授, Kōsaka-kyōju): The Okamura siblings' uncle and Bago's acquaintance. He was killed by Gedon because he knew their secret.

=== Gedon ===
Gedon (ゲドン) is the evil organization based in the Amazon before moving to Japan, bent on world dominion and fueled by human blood.

- Ten-Faced Demon Gorgos (十面鬼ゴルゴス, Jūmenki Gorugosu): The leader of Gedon, Gorgos' boulder-like lower body holds many faces. He possesses the GaGa Armlet and wishes to acquire the GiGi Armlet Daisuke possesses in order to achieve his goal of ruling the world with Incan science. After being forced to abandon his base, Gorgos attacks Yurigaoka and starts slaughtering people with his acidic foam until Amazon arrives and battles him until he is forced to fall back when one of his faces is killed. Falling into Dobsonfly Beastman's trap, Gorgos loses his other faces before Daisuke uses his Daisetsudan to rip off his right arm that was wearing the GaGa Armlet, only for one of Garanda's Black Followers to steal it and give it to Emperor Zero, Gorgos explodes into pieces in the sky and Gedon is defeated.
- Akajusha (赤ジューシャ, Akajūsha; "Red Followers"): Geddon's female foot soldiers, serving as their eyes and ears.

=== Garanda Empire ===
The Garanda Empire (ガランダー帝国, Garandā Teikoku) makes its appearance prior to Gorgos' death, taking the GaGa Bracelet for their own use as they go on a campaign of terrorist attacks on Tokyo to make it into their seat of power before going after the rest of the world. Led by the mysterious "Ruler" and stationed underground in a trap-filled base, the Garanda Empire also uses Beastmen as their monsters.

- Ruler (支配者, Shihaisha): The true leader of Garanda and Gedon, wearing silvery white robes that hide his true nature. He makes himself known to Amazon when he destroys the Helium Bomb's detonation system, unmasked as the Real Great Emperor Zero (真のゼロ大帝, Shin no Zero-taitei) using his lance to execute traitors and failures alike. When Daisuke arrives to Garanda's base, Zero negates the GiGi Armlet's powers with his lance as the Helium Bomb is installed. However, once the GaGa Armlet is fused to the GiGi Armlet, Daisuke become immune to Zero's power as he loses his arm to the Kamen Rider before being impaled by one of his spears and having both of his arms cut off. He still refuses to go down quietly, forcing Amazon to use Super Daisetsudan to behead him, causing him to explode with Garanda's base destroyed in the process.
- Kurojusha (黒ジューシャ, Kurojūsha; "Black Followers"): The Garanda Empire's foot soldiers.

== Episodes ==
1. Man or Beast? The Cool Guy Who Came From the Jungle! (人か？野獣か？密林から来た凄い奴！, Hito ka? Yajū ka? Mitsurin Kara Kita Sugoi Yatsu!) (Original Airdate: October 19, 1974)
2. Ten-Faced Demon! God or Devil? (十面鬼！神か？悪魔か？, Jūmenki! Kami ka? Akuma ka?) (Original Airdate: October 26, 1974)
3. The Strong, Naked, Fast Guy! (強くてハダカで速い奴！, Tsuyokute Hadaka de Hayai Yatsu!) (Original Airdate: November 2, 1974)
4. Run! The Raging Jungler (走れ！怒りのジャングラー, Hashire! Ikari no Jangurā) (Original Airdate: November 9, 1974)
5. The Weirdo Who Came From Underground!! (地底から来た変なヤツ！！, Chitei Kara Kita Hen na Yatsu!!) (Original Airdate: November 16, 1974)
6. The Inca Rope-Pattern Writing Mystery!! (インカ縄文字の謎！！, Inka Nawa Moji no Nazo!!) (Original Airdate: November 23, 1974)
7. Melt! Melt! The Terrifying Snake Beastman (とける！とける!恐怖のヘビ獣人, Tokeru! Tokeru! Kyōfu no Hebi Jūjin) (Original Airdate: November 30, 1974)
8. The Crocodile Beastman Who Attacked the School (学校を襲ったワニ獣人, Gakkō o Osotta Wani Jūjin) (Original Airdate: December 7, 1974)
9. Go, Amazon! The Crab Beastman's Island! (ゆけアマゾン！カニ獣人の島へ!, Yuke Amazon! Kani Jūjin no Shima e!) (Original Airdate: December 14, 1974)
10. Black Cat Beastman Aiming at the Nursery School! (黒ネコ獣人保育園をねらう！, Kuro Neko Jūjin Hoikuen o Nerau!) (Original Airdate: December 21, 1974)
11. The Golden Snail's the Reaper's Envoy!? (金色のカタツムリは死神の使い！？, Kin'iro no Katatsumuri wa Shinigami no Tsukai!?) (Original Airdate: December 28, 1974)
12. Seen! Gedon's Beastman Modification Room (見た！ゲドンの獣人改造室！！, Mita! Gedon no Jūjin Kaizōshitsu) (Original Airdate: January 4, 1975)
13. Approaching! Ten-Faced Demon! Danger, Amazon!! (迫る！十面鬼！危うしアマゾン！！, Semaru! Jūmenki! Ayaushi Amazon!!) (Original Airdate: January 11, 1975)
14. The Ten-Faced Demon Dies! And a New Enemy? (十面鬼死す！そして新しい敵？, Jūmenki Shisu! Soshite Atarashii Teki?) (Original Airdate: January 18, 1975)
15. He Came Forth! The Terrible Zero the Great (出たぞ！恐怖のゼロ大帝, Deta zo! Kyōfu no Zero-taitei) (Original Airdate: January 25, 1975)
16. Garanda's Tokyo Sea of Flames Operation!! (ガランダーの東京火の海作戦！！, Garandā no Tōkyō Hi no Umi Sakusen!!) (Original Airdate: February 1, 1975)
17. Mt. Fuji's Big Explosion? Tokyo's Frying Pan Operation! (富士山大爆発？東京フライパン作戦！, Fujisan Dai Bakuhatsu? Tōkyō Furaipan Sakusen!) (Original Airdate: February 8, 1975)
18. Zero's Terror! The Massive Earthquake Operation!! (ゼロの恐怖！大地震作戦！！, Zero no Kyōfu! Ōjishin Sakusen!!) (Original Airdate: February 15, 1975)
19. Going into Action, The Garanda Youth Squad (出動、ガランダー少年部隊, Shutsudō, Garandā Shōnen Butai) (Original Airdate: February 22, 1975)
20. Mole Beastman's Last Activity!! (モグラ獣人最後の活躍！！, Mogura Jūjin Saigo no Katsuyaku!!) (Original Airdate: March 1, 1975)
21. Cannibal Beastman to Eat the Frozen Rider (冷凍ライダーを食べる人食い獣人！, Reitō Raidā o Taberu Hitokui Jūjin) (Original Airdate: March 8, 1975)
22. Inca Doll's Day to Annihilate Greater Tokyo (インカ人形大東京全滅の日！？, Inka Ningyō Dai Tōkyō Zenmetsu no Hi!?) (Original Airdate: March 15, 1975)
23. Imitation Rider vs. Amazon Rider! (にせライダー対アマゾンライダー！, Nise Raidā Tai Amazon Raidā!) (Original Airdate: March 22, 1975)
24. You Did It, Amazon!! The End of Zero the Great!! (やったぞアマゾン！ゼロ大帝の最後！！, Yatta zo Amazon! Zero-taitei no Saigo!!) (Original Airdate: March 29, 1975)

== Film ==
The Kamen Rider Amazon movie is a theatrical version of episode 16, depicting Gengoro Beastman's attempt to execute Garanda's Tokyo Sea of Flame plan.

== S.I.C. Hero Saga ==
The S.I.C. Hero Saga story for Amazon as published in the May through July 2004 issues of Monthly Hobby Japan magazine is titled Masked Rider Amazon Edition: Pre-Stage (MASKED RIDER AMAZON -プレ・ステージ-, Kamen Raidā Amazon Pure Sutēji). It serves as a prologue to the Amazon series, and features the original characters Pre-Amazon (プレ・アマゾン, Pure Amazon), the Ten-Faced Demon Gorgos (Complete) (十面鬼ゴルゴス（完全体）, Jūmenki Gorugosu (Kanzentai)), Kitty (キティ, Kiti), and the Jungler (Bago Production) (ジャングラー（バゴー製作）, Jangurā (Bagō Seisaku)).

Chapter titles

1. Human-Faced Stone (人面岩, Jinmen'iwa)
2. Meteorite (隕石, Inseki)
3. Armlet (腕輪, Udewa)

== Kamen Rider Amazons ==
To celebrate the 45th anniversary of the Kamen Rider Series, Toei and Amazon.com collaborated on an original Amazon Video series titled Kamen Rider Amazons (仮面ライダーアマゾンズ, Kamen Raidā Amazonzu), serving as a reimagining of Kamen Rider Amazon in a modern biopunk setting.

== Cast ==
- Tōru Okazaki as Daisuke Yamamoto/Amazon
- Akiji Kobayashi as Tōbei Tachibana
- Yōji Matsuda as Masahiko Okamura
- Mariko Matsuoka as Ritsuko Okamura
- Ushio Akashi as Elder Bago
- Hirohisa Nakata as Great Emperor Zero

=== Voice cast ===
- Ryūji Saikachi as Mogura Beastman/Ten-Faced Demon Gorgos (human rock face)
- Ritsuo Sawa as Ten-Faced Demon Gorgos
- Osamu Saka as The Ruler of Garanda Empire
- Gorō Naya as Narrator

== Songs ==
Opening theme

- "Amazon Rider Koko ni Ari" (アマゾンライダーここにあり, Amazon Raidā Koko ni Ari; "Amazon Rider is Here")
  - Lyrics: Shotaro Ishinomori
  - Composition: Shunsuke Kikuchi
  - Artist: Masato Shimon

Ending theme

- "Amazon Da-Da-Da!!" (アマゾンダダダ!!)
  - Lyrics: Saburō Yatsude
  - Composition: Shunsuke Kikuchi
  - Artist: Masato Shimon with the Columbia Yurikago-kai
  - Episodes: 1–14 (1st verse), 15–24 (2nd verse)
