= Kamen Rider (1979 TV series) =

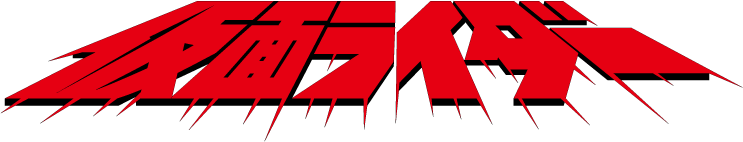
- Original logo
- Also known as: Skyrider; New Kamen Rider; Kamen Rider '79; The Masked Rider
- Genre: Tokusatsu; Superhero fiction Science fiction Action/Adventure; Fantasy
- Created by: Shotaro Ishinomori
- Developed by: Masaru Igami
- Written by: Masaru Igami; Kimio Hirayama; Takashi Ezure; Katsuhiko Taguchi; Tsutomu Tsukushi; Kyoko Sagiyama; Ikuro Suzuki
- Directed by: Minoru Yamada; Katsuhiko Taguchi; Atsuo Okunaka; Hideo Tanaka; Kimio Hirayama; Shigeho Hirota
- Starring: Hiroaki Murakami; Kimiko Tanaka; Naoko Fushimi; Kaori Tatsumi; Mie Suzuki; Sayako Eguchi; Jin Takase; Nobuo Tsukamoto; Shinzo Hotta; Yōsuke Naka
- Composer: Shunsuke Kikuchi
- Country of origin: Japan
- No. of episodes: 54

Production
- Producers: Toru Hirayama (Toei); Masashi Abe (Toei)
- Running time: 20–25 minutes
- Production companies: Ishimori Productions; Toei Company; Mainichi Broadcasting System

Original release
- Network: JNN (MBS, TBS)
- Release: October 5, 1979 – October 10, 1980

Related
- Kamen Rider Stronger; Kamen Rider Super-1

Kamen Rider (仮面ライダー, Kamen Raidā), later retitled as New Kamen Rider (仮面ライダー(新), Kamen Raidā Shin) and also known as Skyrider (スカイライダー, Sukairaidā), is a Japanese tokusatsu television series created by Shotaro Ishinomori and the sixth program in the Kamen Rider Series. The series was produced by Toei Company. The series aired every Friday at 7:00 PM on MBS from October 5, 1979 to October 10, 1980.

The 1979 series was initially intended as a reboot of the original 1971 series of the same name, going back to the basic, essential themes established in that show, but eventually it was established that all the previous Kamen Rider shows were canonical to it, with previous Riders appearing.

== Story ==
Doctor Keitarō Shido, an acclaimed scientist, has been kidnapped by the terrorist organization Neo-Shocker to exploit his expertise in robotics technology. Desperate to escape, he convinces Neo-Shocker's command to allow him to operate on an injured camper. Explaining that he can turn the camper, Hiroshi Tsukuba into a powerful Neo-Shocker warrior, they allow Doctor Shido to operate. However, he quickly turns the tables on them, transforming Hiroshi, not into a kaijin, but the powerful warrior Sky Rider, using his newfound abilities to combat the evil Neo-Shocker menace.

== Characters ==
- Hiroshi Tsukuba (筑波 洋, Tsukuba Hiroshi): A gliding enthusiast caught in a conflict with Neo-Shocker after one of their agents murdered his friends. He ended up being caught and turned into a cyborg by both Keitaro and Neo-Shocker after he was mortally injured in an attempt to save Keitaro from Neo-Shocker, before he and the scientist managed to escape from their captors and use his newfound powers as Skyrider (スカイライダー, Sukairaidā) to fight the terrorist group.
- Keitarō Shido (志度 敬太郎, Shido Keitarō): A scientist targeted by Neo-Shocker who was responsible for Hiroshi becoming Sky Rider. To keep a low profile, having hang glided in his youth, Shido founded the Shido Hang Glide Club and last aided Sky Rider in disarming a Plus-Alpha Bomb before leaving the country to join the Anti-Neo-Shocker Committee.
- Midori Kanō (叶 みどり, Kanō Midori): Shido's aide.
- Yumi Nozaki (野崎 ユミ, Nozaki Yumi): A member of the Shido Hang Glide Club.
- Michi Sugimura (杉村 ミチ, Sugimura Michi): A member of the Shido Hang Glide Club.
- Konta Tonda (飛田 今太, Tonda Konta): A photojournalist who is looking for a good story, usually losing consciousness when he is about to stumble into a fight between Sky Rider and Neo-Shocker.
- Genjirō Tani (谷 源次郎, Tani Genjirō): A senior of Hiroshi's and a friend of Shido, Tani owns the Blanca Coffee Shop that serves as Sky Rider's new base of operations. Having lost his family to Neo-Shocker in the past, Tani is eager to help Hiroshi take the organization down.
- Numa (沼)
- Aki Ozawa (小沢 アキ, Ozawa Aki)
- Naoko Itō (伊東 ナオコ, Itō Naoko)
- Kanji Yada/GanGan G (矢田 勘次／がんがんじい, Yada Kanji/Gan Gan Jī)

=== Neo-Shocker ===
Shocker is once again reformed as the Neo-Shocker (ネオショッカー, Neo Shokkā) organization, playing a role in numerous disappearances and terrorist attacks against the Japanese government. Spreading their influence across the world, their goal is the genocide of about two thirds of the current human population on Earth with them as the dominant majority. Though the other branches are succeeding unopposed, only the Japanese branch is making no progress due to the interference of Sky Rider.

- Great Leader of Neo-Shocker (ネオショッカー大首領, Neo Shokkā Dai Shuryō): Hailing from Dark Nebula B-26, he is a giant, alien dragon who is the leader of the Neo-Shocker organization and “Emperor of the Dark Nebula”. Destroyed in a bomb explosion by the combined efforts of all previous Kamen Riders.
- General Monster/Yamorijin (ゼネラルモンスター／ヤモリジン, Zeneraru Monsutā/Yamorijin): A former Nazi under Colonel Zol, he is the first chief of Neo-Shocker's Japanese branch who wields a cane. Eventually promoted, Monster underwent a modification into Yamorijin, a gecko cyborg. Due to a recent failure he was presented with the red eye, which signals that if he fails for a final time he will be terminated. He was executed by Sky Rider's Sky Kick. He is revived by the Badan Empire in Kamen Rider Spirits vol. 8, kidnapping people in Sapporo. He was eventually destroyed by Kamen Rider ZX's Rider Spin Shot and crashed into Admiral Majin.
- Admiral Majin (魔人提督, Majin Teitoku): The second and final chief of the Neo-Shocker organization. He was the only Neo-Shocker member with no kaijin form. He was executed by Kamen Rider 2, Kamen Rider Stronger and Sky Rider's triple kick. He is revived by the Badan Empire in Kamen Rider Spirits vol. 8, confronting Sky Rider in Mashu Lake, but is eventually destroyed by Sky Rider's Dragonfly Chute and crashed into Yamorijin.
- Gingaoh (銀河王, Ginga Ō; lit. "Galaxy King"): Gingaoh is the main antagonist in the Sky Rider movie, a mechanical alien invader that Neo-Shocker formed an alliance with. He was destroyed in his spaceship explosion.
- Ari Commandos (アリコマンド, Ari Komando): Ant-like foot soldiers in black.
- Skull Assassination Squad (ドクロ暗殺隊, Dokuro Ansatsu Tai): Skull-masked elite guards who wield swords and crossbows.
- Neo-Shocker Scientists:
  - Professor Doc (プロフェッサー・ドク, Puroffesā Doku): A friend of General Monster. After General Monster died, he was sentenced to death by Admiral Majin and killed by Shibirayjin.
  - Doctor Meteor (ドクター・メテオ, Dokutā Meteo): An authority on brain surgery. Killed by Kamen Rider Stronger's Electro Shock.
  - Doctor X (ドクターX, Dokutā Ekkusu): He repairs or scraps Ari Commands in a dock disguised as a pediatric clinic.
  - Shiroari Commandos (白アリコマンド, Shiroari Komando): Termite-like scientists who assist in the conversion of humans into cyborgs.

== Episodes ==
No.	Title	Directed by	Written by	Original release date
1	"The Cyborg Flies in the Sky"; Transliteration: "Kaizō Ningen Ōzora o Tobu" (Japanese: 改造人間大空を翔ぶ)	Minoru Yamada	Masaru Igami	October 5, 1979
2	"Bizarre! Kumojin"; Transliteration: "Kyodai Kumo Gyakushū" (Japanese: 怪奇！クモンジン)	Minoru Yamada	Masaru Igami	October 12, 1979
3	"It's Courage! The Fear of the Bat Flute"; Transliteration: "Yūki da! Kōmori-bue no Kyōfu" (Japanese: 勇気だ！コウモリ笛の恐怖)	Katsuhiko Taguchi	Masaru Igami	October 19, 1979
4	"Two Cyborgs, the Angry Rider Break"; Transliteration: "Gakkō no Kaidan Tsū" (Japanese: Futatsu no Kaizō Ningen Ikari no Raidā Bureiku)	Katsuhiko Taguchi	Masaru Igami	October 26, 1979
5	"Fly, Ride on a Girl's Dreams"; Transliteration: "Tobe Shōjo no Yume o Nosete" (Japanese: 翔べ 少女の夢をのせて)	Minoru Yamada	Masaru Igami	November 2, 1979
6	"Kinokojin! The Devil's Hands are Cold"; Transliteration: "Kinokojin! Akuma no Te wa Tsumetai" (Japanese: キノコジン！悪魔の手は冷たい)	Minoru Yamada	Kimio Hirayama	November 9, 1979
7	"Kamagirijin! The Dreadful Ceremony"; Transliteration: "Kinokojin! Akuma no Te wa Tsumetai" (Japanese: カマギリジン！恐怖の儀式)	Katsuhiko Taguchi	Masaru Igami	November 16, 1979
8	"Mukadenjin's Trap! The Mysterious Operating Room"; Transliteration: "Mukadenjin no Wana! Nazo no Shujutsushitsu" (Japanese: ムカデンジンの罠！謎の手術室)	Katsuhiko Taguchi	Masaru Igami	November 23, 1979
9	"Cobranjin's Murder Army"; Transliteration: "Koburanjin no Satsujin Gundan" (Japanese: コブランジンの殺人軍団)	Minoru Yamada	Masaru Igami	November 30, 1979
10	"Seen! Kaningerjin's Secret"; Transliteration: "Mita! Kaningājin no Himitsu" (Japanese: 見た！カニンガージンの秘密)	Minoru Yamada	Kimio Hirayama	December 7, 1979
11	"Sanshojin! Escape from Hell Valley"; Transliteration: "Sanshōjin! Jigokudani no Dasshutsu" (Japanese: サンショウジン！地獄谷の脱出)	Minoru Yamada	Takashi Edzure	December 14, 1979
12	"Dark Santa Claus; Ah, Transformation Impossible"; Transliteration: "Kurayami no Santa Kurōsu Aa Henshin Fukanō" (Japanese: 暗闇のサンタクロースああ変身不可能)	Katsuhiko Taguchi	Masaru Igami	December 21, 1979
13	"Arijigokujin, Tokyo Explodes Before 3:00"; Transliteration: "Arijigokujin Tōkyō Bakuhatsu Sanjikan-mae" (Japanese: アリジゴクジン東京爆発３時間前)	Katsuhiko Taguchi	Masaru Igami	December 28, 1979
14	"Haejigokujin, Kamen Rider Close Call"; Transliteration: "Haejigokujin Kamen Raidā Kikiippatsu" (Japanese: ハエジゴクジン仮面ライダー危機一髪)	Minoru Yamada	Masaru Igami	January 4, 1980
15	"Dreadful Aokabijin's Big Tokyo Earthquake"; Transliteration: "Kyōfu no Aokabijin no Tōkyō Dai Jishin" (Japanese: 恐怖のアオカビジンの東京大地震)	Minoru Yamada	Kimio Hirayama	January 11, 1980
16	"The Immortal Gokiburijin, What is the True Identity of General Monster?"; Transliteration: "Fujimi no Gokiburijin Zeneraru Monsutā no Shōtai wa?" (Japanese: 不死身のゴキブリジンＧ(ゼネラル)モンスターの正体は？)	Minoru Yamada	Masaru Igami	January 18, 1980
17	"You Did It! The End of General Monster"; Transliteration: "Yatta zo! Zeneraru Monsutā no Saigo" (Japanese: やったぞ！Ｇ(ゼネラル)モンスターの最後)	Minoru Yamada	Masaru Igami	January 25, 1980
18	"Admiral Majin's Great Electric Hell Operation"; Transliteration: "Majin Teitoku no Denki Jigoku Dai Sakusen" (Japanese: 魔神提督の電気ジゴク大作戦)	Atsuo Okunaka	Masaru Igami	February 1, 1980
19	"Cover Your Ears Too! Okamijin's Murderous Cry"; Transliteration: "Kimi mo Mimi o Fusage! Ōkamijin Koroshi no Sakebi" (Japanese: 君も耳をふさげ！オオカミジン殺しの叫び)	Atsuo Okunaka	Masaru Igami	February 8, 1980
20	"Two Kamen Riders, Who is Another?"; Transliteration: "Futari no Kamen Raidā Mō Hitori wa Dare da?" (Japanese: ２人の仮面ライダーもう１人はだれだ？)	Minoru Yamada	Masaru Igami	February 15, 1980
21	"Enter Stronger; Two Riders vs. Two Formidable Monsters"; Transliteration: "Sutorongā Tōjō Futari Raidā Tai Kyōteki Ni Kaijin" (Japanese: ストロンガー登場２人ライダー対強敵２怪人)	Minoru Yamada	Masaru Igami	February 22, 1980
22	"Kogoensky Froze Tokyo 5 Seconds Ago"; Transliteration: "Kogoensukī Tōkyō Reitō Gobyō-mae" (Japanese: コゴエンスキー東京冷凍５秒前)	Katsuhiko Taguchi	Tatsuhiko Takada	February 29, 1980
23	"Monster Flying Squirrel Brothers and Two Riders"; Transliteration: "Kaijin Musasabi Kyōdai to Futari no Raidā" (Japanese: 怪人ムササビ兄弟と２人のライダー)	Minoru Yamada	Masaru Igami	March 7, 1980
24	"Madarakajin, Fear of Poison Gas"; Transliteration: "Madarakajin Dokugasu no Kyōfu" (Japanese: マダラカジン毒ガスの恐怖)	Katsuhiko Taguchi	Kyōko Sagiyama	March 14, 1980
25	"Heavy! Heavy! The 50-ton Baby"; Transliteration: "Omoi zo! Omoi zo! Gojutton no Akachan" (Japanese: 重いぞ！重いぞ！５０トンの赤ちゃん)	Atsuo Okunaka	Takashi Edzure	March 21, 1980
26	"Three Riders vs. Neoshocker's School Fortress"; Transliteration: "San'nin Raidā Tai Neo Shokkā no Gakkō Yōsai" (Japanese: ３人ライダー対ネオショッカーの学校要塞)	Atsuo Okunaka	Katsuhiko Taguchi	March 28, 1980
27	"Tank and Kaijin the Second Generation Corps, Full Force of Eight Riders"; Transliteration: "Sensha to Kaijin Nisei Butai Hachi'nin Raidā Seizoroi" (Japanese: 戦車と怪人II世部隊 ８人ライダー勢ぞろい)	Minoru Yamada	Katsuhiko Taguchi	April 4, 1980
28	"Eight Riders' Great Training of Friendship"; Transliteration: "Hachi'nin Raidā Yūjō no Dai Tokkun" (Japanese: ８人ライダー友情の大特訓)	Minoru Yamada	Katsuhiko Taguchi	April 11, 1980
29	"First Appearance! Powered Sky Rider's Finishing Move"; Transliteration: "Hatsu Kōkai! Kyōka Sukairaidā no Hissatsu-waza" (Japanese: 初公開！強化スカイライダーの必殺技)	Hideo Tanaka	Tatsuhiko Takada	April 18, 1980
30	"He Eats Dreams? The Strange Boy Who Came From the Amazon"; Transliteration: "Yume o Taberu? Amazon kara Kita Fushigi na Shōnen" (Japanese: 夢を食べる？アマゾンから来た不思議な少年)	Hideo Tanaka	Takashi Edzure	April 25, 1980
31	"Run, X-Rider! Hiroshi Tsukuba! Don't Die!!"; Transliteration: "Hashire Ekkusu Raidā! Tsukuba Hiroshi yo Shinu na!!" (Japanese: 走れＸライダー！筑波洋よ死ぬな！！)	Minoru Yamada	Takashi Edzure	May 2, 1980
32	"Thank You, Keisuke Jin! Leave the Final Blow to Me!!"; Transliteration: "Arigatō Jin Keisuke! Todome wa Ore ni Makasero!!" (Japanese: ありがとう神敬介！とどめは俺にまかせろ！！)	Minoru Yamada	Takashi Edzure	May 9, 1980
33	"Hello! Riderman, be Careful of Nezura Man"; Transliteration: "Harō! Raidāūman Nezura Doku ni Ki o Tsukero!!" (Japanese: ハロー! ライダーマンネズラ毒に気をつけろ!!)	Minoru Yamada	Kyōko Sagiyama	May 16, 1980
34	"Danger, Sky Rider! He's Come! Shirō Kazami!!"; Transliteration: "Ayaushi Sukairaidā! Yattekita zo Kazami Shirō!!" (Japanese: 危うしスカイライダー！やって来たぞ風見志郎！！)	Kimio Hirayama	Tatsuhiko Takada	May 23, 1980
35	"Kazami Senpai! I'll Get the Tako Gang!!"; Transliteration: "Kazami-senpai! Tako Gyangu wa Ore ga Yaru!!" (Japanese: 風見先輩！タコギャングはオレがやる！！)	Kimio Hirayama	Tatsuhiko Takada	May 30, 1980
36	"Hurry, Hayato Ichimonji! Save the People Caught in Trees!!"; Transliteration: "Isoge, Ichimonji Hayato! Ki ni Sareru Hitobito o Sukue!!" (Japanese: 急げ、一文字隼人！樹にされる人々を救え！！)	Minoru Yamada	Takashi Edzure	June 6, 1980
37	"The Mystery of Hyakki Village! Is Hiroshi also Caught in a Tree?"; Transliteration: "Hyakki-mura no Kai! Hiroshi mo Ki ni Sareru no ka?" (Japanese: 百鬼村の怪！洋も樹にされるのか？)	Minoru Yamada	Takashi Edzure	June 13, 1980
38	"Please, Shigeru Jō! There's the Ari Commando Training School With a Million Yen Monthly Salary"; Transliteration: "Kitare, Jō Shigeru! Gekkyū Hyakuman'en no Ari Komando Yōseijo" (Japanese: 来たれ、城茂！月給百万円のアリコマンド養成所)	Minoru Yamada	Tatsuhiko Takada	June 20, 1980
39	"Help! Two Riders!! Mother Becomes a Demon"; Transliteration: "Tasukete! Futari no Raidā!! Kāchan ga Oni ni Naru" (Japanese: 助けて！２人のライダー！！母ちゃんが鬼になる)	Kimio Hirayama	Tatsuhiko Takada	June 27, 1980
40	"Chase, Hayato! The Kappa's Bowl Flies Through the Sky"; Transliteration: "Oe Hayato! Kappa no Sara ga Sora o Tobu" (Japanese: 追え隼人！カッパの皿が空をとぶ)	Kimio Hirayama	Tatsuhiko Takada	July 4, 1980
41	"Ghost Story Series - The Secret of the Phantom Building"; Transliteration: "Kaidan Shirīzu - Yūrei Biru no Himitsu" (Japanese: 怪談シリーズ・幽霊ビルのひみつ)	Minoru Yamada	Tatsuhiko Takada	July 11, 1980
42	"Ghost Story Series - Zombie! The Monster is Revived"; Transliteration: "Kaidan Shirīzu - Zonbī! Obake ga Ikikaeru" (Japanese: 怪談シリーズ・ゾンビー！お化けが生きかえる)	Minoru Yamada	Kyōko Sagiyama	July 18, 1980
43	"Ghost Story Series - Hōichi the Earless' 999 Ears"; Transliteration: "Kaidan Shirīzu - Miminashi Hōichi Kyūhyakukyūjūkyū no Mimi" (Japanese: 怪談シリーズ・耳なし芳一９９９の耳)	Shigeho Hirota	Takashi Edzure	July 25, 1980
44	"Ghost Story Series - The Werecat Wants Children's Blood!"; Transliteration: "Kaidan Shirīzu - Noroi no Bakeneko Kodomo no Chi ga Hoshii!" (Japanese: 怪談シリーズ・呪いの化け猫 子供の血が欲しい！)	Shigeho Hirota	Tatsuhiko Takada	August 1, 1980
45	"Ghost Story Series - The Snake Woman Curses Hiroshi Tsukuba!"; Transliteration: "Kaidan Shirīzu - Hebi On'na ga Tsukuba Hiroshi o Norou!" (Japanese: 怪談シリーズ・蛇女が筑波洋を呪う！)	Minoru Yamada	Takashi Edzure	August 8, 1980
46	"Ghost Story Series - The Breakable Human! Fear of the Mirror's Center"; Transliteration: "Kaidan Shirīzu - Kudakeru Ningen! Kagami no Naka no Kyōfu" (Japanese: 怪談シリーズ・くだける人間！鏡の中の恐怖)	Minoru Yamada	Kyōko Sagiyama	August 15, 1980
47	"Sky Rider's Greatest Weakness! Attack the 0.5 Second Blind Spot"; Transliteration: "Sukairaidā Saidai no Jakuten! Rētengobyō no Shikaku o Tsuke" (Japanese: スカイライダー最大の弱点！０．５秒の死角をつけ)	Shigeho Hirota	Takashi Edzure	August 22, 1980
48	"Four Sky Riders, Who is the Real One?"; Transliteration: "Yo'nin no Sukairaidā Honmono wa Dare da?" (Japanese: ４人のスカイライダー本物はだれだ？)	Shigeho Hirota	Tatsuhiko Takada	August 29, 1980
49	"Rocket Launch! Hiroshi Tsukuba Goes to the Space Graveyard"; Transliteration: "Roketto Hassha! Tsukuba Hiroshi o Uchū no Hakaba e" (Japanese: ロケット発射！筑波洋を宇宙の墓場へ)	Minoru Yamada	Tatsuhiko Takada	September 5, 1980
50	"You, Also Enlist in the Ari Commando Boys' Squad!?"; Transliteration: "Kimi mo Ari Komando Shōnen-tai ni Nyūtai seyo!?" (Japanese: 君もアリコマンド少年隊に入隊せよ！？)	Minoru Yamada	Ikuro Suzuki	September 12, 1980
51	"Neoshocker Red & White, Great Decisive Battle of Death"; Transliteration: "Neo Shokkā Kōhaku Shi no Dai Kessen" (Japanese: ネオショッカー紅白死の大決戦)	Minoru Yamada	Kyōko Sagiyama	September 19, 1980
52	"Hiroshi's Father Had Lived! As Altered Human FX777?"; Transliteration: "Hiroshi no Chichi ga Ikite Ita! Kaizō Ningen Efu Ekkusu Surī Sebun to wa?" (Japanese: 洋の父が生きていた！改造人間ＦＸ７７７とは？)	Atsuo Okunaka	Takashi Edzure	September 26, 1980
53	"The End of Admiral Majin! And the Great Leader's True Identity?"; Transliteration: "Majin Teitoku no Saigo! Soshite Dai Shuryō no Shōtai wa?" (Japanese: 魔神提督の最後！そして大首領の正体は？)	Atsuo Okunaka	Takashi Edzure	October 3, 1980
54	"Farewell, Hiroshi Tsukuba! Eight Heroes Forever...."; Transliteration: "Saraba Tsukuba Hiroshi! Hachi'nin no Yūshi yo Eien ni...." (Japanese: さらば筑波洋！８人の勇士よ永遠に・・・・)	Atsuo Okunaka	Takashi Edzure	October 10, 1980

== Special ==
Immortal Kamen Rider Special aired on September 8, 1979. Tobei Tachibana visits a Kamen Rider museum where he talks to some children about the Kamen Riders. Scenes from Kamen Rider, X, Amazon and Stronger are shown. He's about to introduce a new Kamen Rider when some of the kids remind him that he forgot Kamen Rider V3. Clips from the movie Kamen Rider V3 vs. Destron Mutants are shown. After the movie clips, Tobei Tachibana introduces Sky Rider, with previews of New Kamen Rider.

== Film ==
The Movie Eight Riders vs. Gingaoh (仮面ライダー 8人ライダーVS銀河王 Kamen Raidā: Hachi'nin Raidā Tai Gingaō) was released on March 15, 1980 and features Sky Rider teaming up with the previous 7 riders.

== Cast ==
- Hiroaki Murakami as Hiroshi Tsukuba
- Kimiko Tanaka as Midori Kanō
- Naoko Fushimi as Michi Sugimura
- Kaori Tatsumi as Yumi Nozaki
- Ryūmei Azuma as Imata Tonda
- Mie Suzuki as Naoko Itō
- Sayako Eguchi as Aki Ozawa
- Jin Takase as Numa
- Kōji Shiratori as Shigeru Kanō
- Tomaru Katsura as Kanji Yada
- Gorō Naya as The Great Leader
- Shinzō Hotta as General Monster
- Yōsuke Naka as Admiral Majin
- Takashi Tabata as Keitarō Shido
- Nobuo Tsukamoto as Genjirō Tani

=== Voice cast ===
- Shinji Nakae as Narrator

== International Broadcasts ==
- In the Philippines, it was aired on RPN-9 as New Masked Rider from 1982 to 1983 with an English dub.

== Songs ==
Opening themes

- "Moero! Kamen Rider" (燃えろ! 仮面ライダー, Moero! Kamen Raidā; "Burn! Kamen Rider")
  - Lyrics: Shotaro Ishinomori
  - Composition & Arrangement: Shunsuke Kikuchi
  - Artist: Ichirou Mizuki and Kōrogi '73
  - Episodes: 1–28
- "Otoko no Na wa Kamen Rider" (男の名は仮面ライダー, Otoko no Na wa Kamen Raidā; "That Man's Name is Kamen Rider")
  - Lyrics: Shotaro Ishinomori
  - Composition & Arrangement: Shunsuke Kikuchi
  - Artist: Ichirou Mizuki
  - Episodes: 29–54

Ending themes

- "Haruka naru Ai ni Kakete" (はるかなる愛にかけて; "Long Distance Love")
  - Lyrics: Saburō Yatsude
  - Composition & Arrangement: Shunsuke Kikuchi
  - Artist: Ichirou Mizuki and Kōrogi '73
  - Episodes: 1–28
- "Kagayake! Hachinin Rider" (輝け! 8人ライダー, Kagayake! Hachinin Raidā; "Shine! Eight Riders")
  - Lyrics: Saburō Yatsude
  - Composition & Arrangement: Shunsuke Kikuchi
  - Artist: Ichirou Mizuki and The Chirps
  - Episodes: 29–54
