= Kamen Rider Stronger =

Television series

- Genre: Tokusatsu; Superhero fiction Science fiction Action/Adventure; Fantasy
- Created by: Shotaro Ishinomori
- Written by: Masaru Igami
- Directed by: Masahiro Tsukada
- Starring: Shigeru Araki; Kyōko Okada; Akiji Kobayashi; Akira Hamada
- Narrated by: Shinji Nakae
- Opening theme: "Kamen Rider Stronger no Uta"
- Ending theme: "Kyō mo Tatakau Stronger" "Stronger Action"
- Composer: Shunsuke Kikuchi
- Country of origin: Japan
- No. of episodes: 39

Production
- Running time: 20–25 minutes
- Production companies: Toei Company; Mainichi Broadcasting System

Original release
- Network: JNN (MBS, TBS)
- Release: April 5 – December 27, 1975

Related
- Kamen Rider Amazon; Skyrider

Kamen Rider Stronger (仮面ライダーストロンガー, Kamen Raidā Sutorongā) is a Japanese tokusatsu television show that aired in 1975. The fifth entry in the Kamen Rider series, Stronger was produced by Toei Company. The program was broadcast on TBS and MBS from April 5, 1975 to December 27, 1975.

== Story ==
Following the death of his close friend and mentor Gorō Numata (沼田 五郎, Numata Gorō), Shigeru Jo joins the evil organization Black Satan. With the promise of great power, and fueled by a desire for revenge, Shigeru undergoes surgery to become one of Black Satan's super soldiers. Secretly, Shigeru knows that Black Satan was responsible for Numata's murder, and he uses the organization as a means to gain the power he needs to exact his vengeance. The newly transformed Shigeru escapes from the Black Satan headquarters before they can brainwash him, and becomes Kamen Rider Stronger. Shortly after his escape, Stronger meets Yuriko Misaki, another cyborg soldier created by Black Satan who can transform into Electro-Wave Human Tackle. Together they combat Black Satan and later the Delza Army, to restore peace in Japan. During a battle against the Delza Army, Tackle sacrifices herself to protect Stronger, and Stronger performs a special procedure on himself to achieve his "Charge-Up Form". Later, the six previous Kamen Riders return to Japan and join Stronger to finally topple the evil Delza Army.

== Characters ==
- Shigeru Jo (城 茂, Jō Shigeru)/Kamen Rider Stronger is the protagonist and eponymous character of the series. When he transforms into his rider form, he shouts "Henshin... Stronger!". In episode 31, he gains the ability to power up into a new "Charge Up" form after undergoing surgery. However, he has to use this power up in less than a minute or else he'll explode.
- Yuriko Misaki/Electro-Wave Human Tackle (岬 ユリ子/電波人間タックル, Misaki Yuriko/Denpa Ningen Takkuru) is the first attempt at a female Kamen Rider. She was to be used by Black Satan like Shigeru, but was saved by him while he was trying to find a way out of Black Satan's secret lair. After some talk, he convinced her to come with him and together with a good friend to many Kamen Riders, Tobei Tachibana they fought Black Satan as Kamen Rider Stronger and the Electro-Wave Human Tackle for quite some time. Over time, Yuriko fell in love with Shigeru, but sadly, in episode 30, she gave her life to defeat the evil Doctor Kate in order to save him from being poisoned. This would forever haunt Shigeru and push him to undergo surgery to attain the even more powerful (and dangerous) Charge Up form. Shotaro Ishinomori and Kamen Rider co-creator Toru Hirayama conceived the idea of Tackle after receiving fan letters from young girls who said they wanted a hero to pretend to be when playing Kamen Rider with other boys.
- Tōbei Tachibana (立花 藤兵衛, Tachibana Tōbee): The mentor of the previous Kamen Riders.

=== Black Satan ===
Black Satan (ブラックサタン, Burakku Satan) is a terrorist organization formed by the remnants of Shocker.

- Great Boss of Black Satan (ブラックサタン大首領, Burakku Satan Dai Shuryō): The leader of Black Satan who is the boss of Satan Bug (サタン虫, Satan Mushi). Destroyed by Stronger's Stronger Electro Kick.
- Titan (Mr. Titan)/One-Eyed Titan (タイタン／一つ目タイタン, Taitan/Hitotsume Taitan): A high-ranking officer of Black Satan. He and General Shadow are rivals. He can assume a human form. He was thrown into the sea by Stronger and destroyed. However, Black Satan learns of his demise and performs a ritual that revives Titan into Hundred-Eyed Titan (百目タイタン, Hyakume Taitan). He was then destroyed by Stronger's Stronger Double Kick.
- Dead Lion (デッドライオン, Deddo Raion): A lionlike monster from Egypt who is known as the strongest great commander of Black Satan. He took over after Mr. Titan's death. After Black Satan's destruction, his whereabouts are unknown.
- Black Satan Soldiers (ブラックサタン戦闘員, Burakku Satan Sentōin): Black owl foot soldiers of Black Satan. Scientists wear white gowns.

==== General Shadow ====
General Shadow (ジェネラルシャドウ, Jeneraru Shadō) is a high-ranking officer who is rivals with Titan. Wielding the Shadow Sword, his signature attack is the Trump Shoot. After abandoning Black Satan, he forms the Delza Army. Destroyed by Stronger (Charge Up)'s Super Electro Lightning Kick.

=== Delza Army ===
The Delza Army (デルザー軍団, Deruzā Gundan) is created by General Shadow after he leaves Black Satan. After its destruction, he forms the Delza Army to fight Kamen Rider Stronger. The first eight of his officers schemed against him, but never challenged General Shadow, but soon General Shadow was overthrown by Great Marshal Machine. The organization was destroyed by the combined efforts of Kamen Rider Stronger and the six previous Riders.

- Delza Army Supreme Commander (デルザー軍団大首領, Deruzā Gundan Dai Shuryō): A stone giant controlled by the one-eyed brain-like Supreme Commander; later revealed to be the true form of the Shocker Supreme Commander from the original series, as well as the true leader behind previous organizations. He takes on the form of a giant rock, also referred to as the Rock Great Leader, impervious to the attacks of the Riders. He then self-destructs in an attempt to kill all seven Riders.
- Delza Army Corps (デルザー軍団戦闘員, Deruzā Gundan Sentōin): The foot soldiers of the Delza Army. Each foot soldier wears a different mask depending on the one who leads them.
- Staff Officer Steel (鋼鉄参謀, Kōtetsu Sanbō): An armor monster. Destroyed by Stronger's Stronger Electro Kick.
- Division Commander Wild Eagle (荒ワシ師団長, Arawashi Shidanchō): An eaglelike monster. Destroyed by Stronger's Underwater Electro Fire.
- Doctor Kate (ドクターケイト, Dokutā Keito): A plumed cockscomblike monster that shoots poisonous liquid. She is destroyed by the poisoned Tackle's Ultra Cyclone, the move taking her own life in the process.
- Major Skull (ドクロ少佐, Dokuro Shōsa): A skulllike monster. Destroyed by Stronger (Charge Up)'s Super Electron Drill Kick.
- Baron Rock (岩石男爵, Ganseki Danshaku): A rocklike monster. Destroyed by Stronger (Charge Up)'s Super Electron Drill Kick (head) and Super Electro Three-step Kick (body).
- General Wolf (狼長官, Ōkami Chōkan): A wolflike monster. Destroyed by Stronger (Charge Up)'s Super Electro Lightning Kick.
- Commanding Officer Brank (隊長ブランク, Taichō Buranku): A Frankenstein's monster-inspired monster. Destroyed by Stronger (Charge Up)'s Super Electro Speed Diving Punch.
- Snake Woman (ヘビ女, Hebi Onna): A snakelike monster who has the ability to suck blood and make humans who look into her eyes follow her orders. Destroyed by Stronger (Charge Up)'s Super Electro Big Wheel Kick.
- Marshal Machine (マシーン大元帥, Mashīn Dai Gensui): A mummy monster from Egypt who later along with his follower Commanders Jishaku and Armored Knight overthrew General Shadow when he failed to capture Kamen Rider Stronger while Commander Jishaku and Armored Knight were able to capture Kamen Rider V3 and Riderman. Destroyed by Stronger's Electro Punch.
- Commander Magnet (磁石団長, Jishaku Danchō): A magnet monster who becomes one of Marshal Machine's followers and has the ability to throw magnets and make the target move to whatever direction he's aiming. He was destroyed with the revived Kaijin Corps.
- Armored Knight (ヨロイ騎士, Yoroi Kishi): An armor monster who becomes one of Marshal Machine's followers and has the ability to make fire from his two swords but later one of his two swords is destroyed by Kamen Rider X's Ridol with help from Kamen Rider Amazon. He was destroyed with the revived Kaijin Corps.

=== Special guest stars ===
- Takeshi Hongo/Kamen Rider 1 from Kamen Rider
- Hayato Ichimonji/Kamen Rider 2 from Kamen Rider
- Shiro Kazami/Kamen Rider V3 from Kamen Rider V3
- Joji Yuki/Riderman from Kamen Rider V3
- Keisuke Jin/Kamen Rider X from Kamen Rider X
- Daisuke Yamamoto/Kamen Rider Amazon from Kamen Rider Amazon

== Episodes ==
1. I am the Electric Human Stronger!! (おれは電気人間ストロンガー！！, Ore wa Denki Ningen Sutorongā!!) (Original Airdate: April 5, 1975)
2. The Secret of Stronger and Tackle! (ストロンガーとタックルの秘密！, Sutorongā to Takkuru no Himitsu!) (Original Airdate: April 12, 1975)
3. The Thriller House Calls for Children!! (スリラーハウスが子どもを呼ぶ！！, Surirā Hausu ga Kodomo o Yobu!!) (Original Airdate: April 19, 1975)
4. The Demonic Motorbike Reckless Driving Operation! (悪魔のオートバイ暴走作戦！！, Akuma no Ōtobai Bōsō Sakusen!!) (Original Airdate: April 26, 1975)
5. Black Satan's School Lunch!? (ブラックサタンの学校給食！？, Burakku Satan no Gakkō Kyūshoku!?) (Original Airdate: May 3, 1975)
6. The Jellyfish Kikkaijin Who Took the Form of a Teacher! (先生に化けたクラゲ奇械人！, Sensei ni Baketa Kurage Kikkaijin!) (Original Airdate: May 10, 1975)
7. Rider Great Reversal!! (ライダー大逆転！！, Raidā Dai Gyakuten!!) (Original Airdate: May 17, 1975)
8. Don't Melt, Rider! The Final Blow, Electro Kick!! (溶けるなライダー！とどめの電キック！！, Tokeru na Raidā! Todome no Den Kikku!!) (Original Airdate: May 24, 1975)
9. The Band of Demons Has Come!! (悪魔の音楽隊がやって来た！！, Akuma no Ongakutai ga Yattekita!!) (Original Airdate: May 31, 1975)
10. The Frightful Gummer Bug! It Targets Humans!! (恐怖のガンマー虫！人間を狙う！！, Kyōfu no Ganmā Mushi! Ningen o Nerau!!) (Original Airdate: June 7, 1975)
11. Chameleorn! Demonic Film!? (カメレオーン！悪魔のフィルム！？, Kamereōn! Akuma no Firumu!?) (Original Airdate: June 14, 1975)
12. Duel! Stronger's Grave!? (決闘！ストロンガーの墓場！？, Kettō! Sutorongā no Hakaba!?) (Original Airdate: June 21, 1975)
13. The One-Eyed Titan! The Final Counter Attack!! (一ツ目タイタン！最後の逆襲！！, Hitotsume Taitan! Saigo no Gyakushū!!) (Original Airdate: June 28, 1975)
14. The Appearance of Enigmatic Chief Executive Shadow! (謎の大幹部シャドウの出現！, Nazo no Dai Kanbu Shadō no Shutsugen!) (Original Airdate: July 5, 1975)
15. Shadow's Trump That Calls Death!! (死を呼ぶシャドウのトランプ！！, Shi o Yobu Shadō no Toranpu!!) (Original Airdate: July 12, 1975)
16. The Bloodsucking Bubunger's Demonic Present! (吸血ブブンガー悪魔のプレゼント！, Kyūketsu Bubungā Akuma no Purezento!) (Original Airdate: July 19, 1975)
17. Ghost Story, The Demonic Easter (怪談 悪魔の復活祭, Kaidan Akuma no Fukkatsusai) (Original Airdate: July 26, 1975)
18. Ghost Story, The Bottomless Swamp (怪談 底なし沼, Kaidan Sokonashi Numa) (Original Airdate: August 2, 1975)
19. Ghost Story: The Cursed Old Castle! (怪談 呪われた古城！, Kaidan Norowareta Kojō!) (Original Airdate: August 9, 1975)
20. The Great Scary Desert! Two Tōbeis?! (恐怖の大砂漠！二人の藤兵衛！？, Kyōfu no Dai Sabaku! Futari no Tōbei!?) (Original Airdate: August 16, 1975)
21. Samegashima, Decisive Battle in the Sea! (鮫ヶ島海中大決戦！, Samegashima Kaichū Dai Kessen!) (Original Airdate: August 23, 1975)
22. Rider Execution at 12:00!? (１２時００分ライダー処刑！？, Jūniji Zerofun Raidā Shokei!?) (Original Airdate: August 30, 1975)
23. The Devil of the Underground Kingdom!! (地底王国の魔王！！, Chitei Ōkoku no Maō!!) (Original Airdate: September 6, 1975)
24. Bizarre! The Unmanned Train Runs!! (怪奇！無人電車が走る！！, Kaiki! Mujin Densha ga Hashiru!!) (Original Airdate: September 13, 1975)
25. Don't Die!! Shigeru Jō in the Electric Chair (死ぬな！！電気椅子の城茂, Shinu na!! Denki Isu no Jō Shigeru) (Original Airdate: September 20, 1975)
26. Seen!! The Great Leader's True Identity!! (見た！！大首領の正体！！, Mita!! Dai Shuryō no Shōtai!!) (Original Airdate: September 27, 1975)
27. Remodelled Majin! The Delza Army Appears!! (改造魔人！デルザー軍団現わる！！, Kaizō Majin! Deruzā Gundan Arawareru!!) (Original Airdate: October 4, 1975)
28. Oh! Stronger...into Small Pieces?! (あ！ストロンガーがこなごなに…？！, A! Sutorongā ga Konagona ni...?!) (Original Airdate: October 11, 1975)
29. The Curse of Majin Kate's Blood! (魔人ケイト血ののろい！, Majin Keito Chi no Noroi!) (Original Airdate: October 18, 1975)
30. Goodbye, Tackle! Her Final Battle!! (さようならタックル！最後の活躍！！, Sayōnara Takkuru! Saigo no Katsuyaku!!) (Original Airdate: October 25, 1975)
31. Stronger's Great Remodelling!! (ストロンガー大改造！！, Sutorongā Dai Kaizō!!) (Original Airdate: November 1, 1975)
32. Deadly! Super Electro Three-step Kick!! (必殺！超電三段キック！！, Hissatsu! Chō Den Sandan Kikku!!) (Original Airdate: November 8, 1975)
33. Stronger Dies in the Full Moon!? (ストロンガー満月に死す！？, Sutorongā Mangetsu ni Shisu!?) (Original Airdate: November 15, 1975)
34. The Snake Woman's Bloodsucking Hell! (ヘビ女の吸血地獄！, Hebi Onna no Kyūketsu Jigoku!) (Original Airdate: November 22, 1975)
35. The Man Who Returned! The Name is V3!! (帰って来た男！その名はＶ３！！, Kaettekita Otoko! Sono Na wa Bui Surī!!) (Original Airdate: November 29, 1975)
36. Three Riders Vs. The Powerful Delza Army! (三人ライダー対強力デルザー軍団！, Sannin Raidā Tai Kyōryoku Deruzā Gundan!) (Original Airdate: December 6, 1975)
37. Riders Captured! Long Live Delza!! (ライダー捕らわる！デルザー万才！！, Raidā Torawaru! Deruzā Banzai!!) (Original Airdate: December 13, 1975)
38. Appearance! Riders 1, 2!! (出現！ライダー１号２号！！, Shutsugen! Raidā Ichigō Nigō!!) (Original Airdate: December 20, 1975)
39. Goodbye! The Glorious Seven Riders! (さようなら！栄光の七人ライダー！, Sayōnara! Eikō no Shichinin Raidā!) (Original Airdate: December 27, 1975)

== Film ==
Kamen Rider Stronger A reedited episode 7. Waniida from Black Satan attacks a young boy and long-time Kamen Rider ally Tōbei Tachibana, but Kamen Rider Stronger and Electro-Wave Human Tackle run in to make the save. However, Shigeru and Yuriko fall into separate traps and are captured by Black Satan. Yuriko fights for her life as Shigeru is brainwashed by the organization.

== Special ==
The 45-minute All Together! Seven Kamen Riders!! (集合!7人の仮面ライダー!! (Zen'in Shūgō! Shichinin no Kamen Raidā!!)), first broadcast on January 3, 1976 (one week after the series' finale) opens with Tobei Tachibana taking some children to a Kamen Rider roadshow. Just as he's reminiscing about all the heroic modified humans he's lived alongside: 1, 2, V3, Riderman, X, Amazon, Stronger and Tackle, the first seven Riders gradually show up to greet him in their human guises, unrecognized by the crowds. When it's revealed that the monsters onstage are real and not actors, the Riders transform to save the crowd and Rider actors, uniting their power to defeat a surviving Delza Army general, Great Generat Darkness (暗黒大将軍, Ankoku Daishōgun) in his hideout beneath the stadium.

== Cast ==
- Shigeru Araki as Shigeru Jō/Kamen Rider Stronger
- Kyōko Okada as Yuriko Misaki
- Akiji Kobayashi as Tōbei Tachibana
- Hiroshi Ogasawara as Yōichirō Masaki
- Akira Hamada as Titan

=== Voice cast ===
- Mahito Tsujimura as Dead Lion
- Gorō Naya as The Great Leader of Black Satan, The Great Leader of Delza Army
- Hidekatsu Shibata as General Shadow
- Osamu Ichikawa as Staff Officer Steel, Marshal Machine
- Machiko Soga as Doctor Kate
- Ritsuo Sawa as Commander Magnet
- Michihiro Ikemizu as Armored Knight
- Shinji Nakae as Narrator

== Songs ==
Opening theme

- "Kamen Rider Stronger no Uta" (仮面ライダーストロンガーの歌, Kamen Raidā Sutorongā no Uta; "The Song of Kamen Rider Stronger")
  - Lyrics: Saburō Yatsude
  - Composition: Shunsuke Kikuchi
  - Artist: Ichirou Mizuki

Ending theme

- "Kyō mo Tatakau Stronger" (今日もたたかうストロンガー, Kyō mo Tatakau Sutorongā; "Stronger Fights Today")
  - Lyrics: Saburō Yatsude
  - Composition: Shunsuke Kikuchi
  - Artists: Masato Shimon & Mitsuko Horie (1–2), Ichirou Mizuki & Mitsuko Horie (3–31)
  - Episodes: 1–31
- "Stronger Action" (ストロンガーアクション, Sutorongā Akushon)
  - Lyrics: Shotaro Ishinomori
  - Composition: Shunsuke Kikuchi
  - Artists: Ichirou Mizuki & Mitsuko Horie
  - Episodes 32–39
