= Kamen Rider X =

Japanese television series

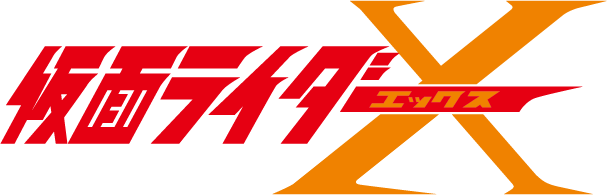
- Genre: Tokusatsu; Superhero fiction Science fiction Action/Adventure; Fantasy
- Created by: Shotaro Ishinomori
- Developed by: Shukei Nagasaka; Masaru Igami
- Directed by: Itaru Orita
- Starring: Ryo Hayami; Naoko Miyama; Akiji Kobayashi; Yasuhiko Uchida; Chisako Kosaka; Miyuki Hayata
- Narrated by: Shinji Nakae
- Composer: Shunsuke Kikuchi
- Country of origin: Japan
- No. of episodes: 35

Production
- Running time: 30 minutes
- Production companies: Mainichi Broadcasting System; Toei Company

Original release
- Network: ANN (MBS, NET)
- Release: February 16 – October 12, 1974

Related
- Kamen Rider V3; Kamen Rider Amazon

Kamen Rider X (仮面ライダーＸ, Kamen Raidā Ekkusu) is a Japanese tokusatsu superhero television series. It was broadcast in 1974 on the Mainichi Broadcasting System and NET, now known as TV Asahi. It is the third entry in the Kamen Rider Series of tokusatsu shows. It starred Ryo Hayami in the title role.

== Plot summary ==
Robotics scientist Keitaro Jin and his son Keisuke become caught up in a campaign of terror by an evil organization known as "G.O.D.". They are attacked and the professor's technology gets stolen, but before Keitaro dies, he performs surgery on his son, using the last of his robotics technology to transform Keisuke into the “X-Rider.” To avenge his father's death and ensure the safety of the entire world, Keisuke uses this technology as he battles the monstrous minions of G.O.D.’s Japan branch.

== Characters ==
- Keisuke Jin (神 敬介, Jin Keisuke): The son of Keitaro Jin, Keisuke suffered mortal injuries inflicted by G.O.D when they attacked the Jins. As a result, with his father's final breath, Keisuke was made into an advanced cyborg developed for marine exploration called a "Kaizorg" (カイゾーグ, Kaizōgu) named Kamen Rider X. Driven to avenge his father's death and save the world, X battles G.O.D..
- Tobei Tachibana (立花 藤兵衛, Tachibana Tōbee): The mentor of the previous Kamen Riders.
- Ryoko Mizuki (水城 涼子, Mizuki Ryōko): Keisuke's fiancée, Keitaro's assistant, and a G.O.D. member. She and her twin sister Kiriko are Interpol agents investigating G.O.D., Ryoko joining the organization to spy on it while allowing herself to be turned into a cyborg. But Ryoko is forced to expose herself while protecting a child from Strong Arms Atlas and is destroyed by the G.O.D. General soon after.
- Kiriko Mizuki (水城 霧子, Mizuki Kiriko): Ryoko's twin sister who is an Interpol investigator. She died protecting Keisuke from Strong Arms Atlas' arrow.
- Chiko (チコ, Chiko): A student of Johoku University and Tobei's coffee shop worker.
- Mako (マコ, Mako): Chiko's friend and Tobei's coffee shop worker.
- Keitaro Jin (神 敬太郎, Jin Keitarō): Keisuke's father, a robotics genius who trained his son with the two having a strained relationship. Refusing to join G.O.D when his technology attracted their attention, Keitaro is fatally wounded and turned his dying son into a cyborg to save his life. Prior to his death, Keitaro copied his mind into a super computer within the Jin Station which he intended to help Keisuke through. But the Jin Station acted on Keitaro’s thought process to self destruct to keep Keisuke from being overly dependent on it.

=== G.O.D. ===
The G.O.D. Secret Organization (GOD秘密機関, Goddo Himitsu Kikan), short for the Government of Darkness (暗黒政府, Ankoku Seifu), is the evil organization supported by foreign nations.

- G.O.D. General Commander (GOD総司令, Goddo Sō Shirei): A mystery man who commands the G.O.D. operatives through taped messages placed in various objects that self-destruct upon relaying his instructions.
- Apollogeist (アポロガイスト, Aporo Gaisuto): The Chief of Security of G.O.D. who wields the Geist Cutter shield and the Apollo Shot shogun. His human appearance wears a white tuxedo with black gloves until he invokes "Apollo Change" (アポロチェンジ, Aporo Chenji). He destroyed himself using his Arm Bomb after he was defeated by X's Finishing Kick.
  - Apollogeist Reborn (再生アポロガイスト, Saisei Aporo Gaisuto): Revived by two doctors of G.O.D. equipped with the Apollo Magnum bayonet on his right hand, the Geist Cutter shield, and the small Geist Cutter shield on his left shoulder. He was destroyed by X's X Kick.
- King Dark (キングダーク, Kingu Dāku): The leader of G.O.D., he reveals himself after Apollo Geist's destruction, mocking X. He was destroyed by a self-destroying function that Dr. Noroi started.
- Dr. Noroi (呪博士, Noroi Hakase): Dr. Noroi is revealed to be the true leader of the Government of Darkness. He was destroyed in King Dark's destruction after being stabbed by X's Ridol Whip.
- G.O.D. Warfare Agents (GOD戦闘工作員, Goddo Sentō Kōsakuin): Warriors who serve as foot soldiers for the Government of Darkness. Not only do they carry spears, they also wield pistols and machine guns.

=== Special guest stars ===
- Hayato Ichimonji/Kamen Rider 2 from Kamen Rider
- Shiro Kazami/Kamen Rider V3 from Kamen Rider V3

== Episodes ==
1. X-X-X-Rider is Born!! (X・X・Xライダー誕生！！, Ekkusu Ekkusu Ekkusu Raidā Tanjō!!) (Original Airdate: February 16, 1974)
2. Run, Cruiser! X-Rider!! (走れクルーザー！Xライダー！！, Hashire Kurūzā! Ekkusu Raidā!!) (Original Airdate: February 23, 1974)
3. Assassination Dark Spider Operation!! (暗殺 黒ぐも作戦！！, Ansatsu Kurogumo Sakusen!!) (Original Airdate: March 2, 1974)
4. G.O.D., the Shadow of Fear!! (ゴッド恐怖の影！！, Goddo Kyōfu no Kage!!) (Original Airdate: March 9, 1974)
5. The One-Eyed Monster's Kidnapping Operation! (一つ目怪人の人さらい作戦！, Hitotsume Kaijin no Hitosarai Sakusen!) (Original Airdate: March 16, 1974)
6. The Japanese Islands Fragmentation Plan! (日本列島ズタズタ作戦！, Nihon Rettō Zutazuta Sakusen!) (Original Airdate: March 23, 1974)
7. The Terrible Genius Human Project! (恐怖の天才人間計画！, Kyōfu no Tensai Ningen Keikaku!) (Original Airdate: March 30, 1974)
8. Mystery!? Little Earth - Middle Earth - Big Earth (怪！？小地球・中地球・大地球, Kai!? Shōchikyū Chūchikyū Daichikyū) (Original Airdate: April 6, 1974)
9. X-Rider's Great Deadly Training (Xライダー必殺大特訓, Ekkusu Raidā Hissatsu Dai Tokkun) (Original Airdate: April 13, 1974)
10. G.O.D. Secret Police! Apollo Geist!! (ゴッド秘密警察！アポロガイスト！！, Goddo Himitsu Keisatsu! Aporo Gaisuto!!) (Original Airdate: April 20, 1974)
11. The Invulnerable Water Snake Monster Hydra! (不死身の水蛇怪人ヒュドラー！, Fujimi no Mizuhebi Kaijin Hyudorā!) (Original Airdate: April 27, 1974)
12. Sweep the ESPer Girl Away! (超能力少女をさらえ！, Chōnōryoku Shōjo o Sarae!) (Original Airdate: May 4, 1974)
13. Godradamus' Great Prophecy! (ゴッドラダムスの大予言！, Goddoradamusu no Dai Yogen!) (Original Airdate: May 11, 1974)
14. Apollo Geist, Mad Insect Underworld (アポロガイスト くるい虫地獄, Aporo Gaisuto Kuruimushi Jigoku) (Original Airdate: May 18, 1974)
15. G.O.D.'s Secret Base! X-Rider Sneaks In!! (ゴッド秘密基地！Xライダー潜入す！！, Goddo Himitsu Kichi! Ekkusu Raidā Sennyū su!!) (Original Airdate: May 25, 1974)
16. Counterattacking Apollo Geist! X-Rider in Danger!! (逆襲アポロガイスト！Xライダー危うし！！, Gyakushū Aporo Gaisuto! Ekkusu Raidā Ayaushi) (Original Airdate: June 1, 1974)
17. Scary! Humans are Turning into Trees!! (恐い！人間が本にされる！！, Kowai! Ningen ga Hon ni Sareru!!) (Original Airdate: June 8, 1974)
18. Scary! It's G.O.D.'s Cat Disguise Operation!! (恐い！ゴッドの化けネコ作戦だ！！, Kowai! Goddo no Bakeneko Sakusen da!!) (Original Airdate: June 15, 1974)
19. The Corpses at the Ghost Mansion Call!! (ゆうれい館で死人がよぶ！！, Yūrei Yakata de Shinin ga Yobu!!) (Original Airdate: June 22, 1974)
20. A Ghost!? The Mysterious Snake Man Appears!! (おばけ！？謎の蛇人間あらわれる！！, Obake!? Nazo no Hebi Ningen Arawareru!!) (Original Airdate: June 29, 1974)
21. Apollo Geist's Last General Attack!! (アポロガイスト 最後の総攻撃！！, Aporo Gaisuto Saigo no Sōkōgeki!!) (Original Airdate: July 6, 1974)
22. The Terrible Great Giant! King Dark Appears!! (恐怖の大巨人！キングダーク出現！！, Kyōfu no Dai Kyojin! Kingu Dāku Shutsugen!!) (Original Airdate: July 13, 1974)
23. King Dark! The Demon's Invention!! (キングダーク！悪魔の発明！！, Kingu Dāku! Akuma no Hatsumei!!) (Original Airdate: July 20, 1974)
24. Revenge Demon Geronimo! The Silent Attack!! (復しゅう鬼ジェロニモ！音もなく襲う！！, Fukushūki Jeronimo! Oto mo Naku Osō!!) (Original Airdate: July 27, 1974)
25. The Mysterious Thief, Rhinoceros Beetle Lupin!! (謎の怪盗カブト虫ルパン！！, Nazo no Kaitō Kabutomushi Rupan!!) (Original Airdate: August 3, 1974)
26. Underworld's Dictator, Starfish Hitler!! (地獄の独裁者ヒトデヒットラー！！, Jigoku no Dokusaisha Hitode Hittorā!!) (Original Airdate: August 10, 1974)
27. Special Edition, Full Force of Five Riders!! (特集 5人ライダー勢ぞろい！, Tokushū Gonin Raidā Seizoroi!!) (Original Airdate: August 17, 1974)
28. Look! X-Rider's Great Transformation!! (見よ！Xライダーの大変身！！, Mi yo! Ekkusu Raidā no Dai Henshin!!) (Original Airdate: August 24, 1974)
29. Deathmatch!! X-Rider vs. X-Rider!! (死闘！！Xライダー対Xライダー！！, Shitō! Ekkusu Raidā Tai Ekkusu Raidā!!) (Original Airdate: August 31, 1974)
30. I Want Blood! The Monster of the Corpse Swamp!! (血がほしいー！しびと沼の怪人！！, Chi ga Hoshī! Shibito Numa no Kaijin!!) (Original Airdate: September 7, 1974)
31. Stand! King Dark!! (立て！キングダーク！！, Tate! Kingu Dāku!!) (Original Airdate: September 14, 1974)
32. Showdown! King Dark vs. X-Rider (対決！キングダーク対Xライダー, Taiketsu! Kingu Dāku Tai Ekkusu Raidā) (Original Airdate: September 21, 1974)
33. Fear! King Dark's Revenge!! (恐怖！キングダークの復しゅう！！, Kyōfu! Kingu Dāku no Fukushū!!) (Original Airdate: September 28, 1974)
34. The Weapon of Terror Aims at Three Riders!! (恐怖の武器が三人ライダーを狙う！！, Kyōfu no Buki ga Sannin Raidā o Nerau!!) (Original Airdate: October 5, 1974)
35. Farewell, X-Rider (さらばXライダー, Saraba Ekkusu Raidā) (Original Airdate: October 12, 1974)

== Films ==
Kamen Rider X
Reedited episode 3. A little girl named Sayoko witnesses the murder of an Interpol agent by the G.O.D. kaijin Hercules. Keisuke Jin saves her before Hercules disposes of her. Sayoko tells Keisuke that G.O.D. is targeting an important official named Kibara. Kamen Rider X has his hands full when G.O.D abducts Kibara and takes Sayoko and her mother hostage.

Five Riders vs. King Dark (五人ライダー対キングダーク, Gonin Raidā Tai Kingu Dāku)
During a motocross practice, Keisuke Jin is ambushed by two of G.O.D.'s kaijin warriors. He transforms into Kamen Rider X, but little does he know that his battle is recorded and analyzed by King Dark to create a super kaijin. Meanwhile, other G.O.D. kaijin are attacking children all over Tokyo. But before the other Riders intervene, the kaijin mysteriously disappear. Upon learning about King Dark's latest plans, Kamen Rider X joins forces with the four Riders to stop G.O.D. and their revived kaijin.

Heisei Rider vs. Shōwa Rider: Kamen Rider Taisen feat. Super Sentai (平成ライダー対昭和ライダー 仮面ライダー大戦 feat.スーパー戦隊, Heisei Raidā Tai Shōwa Raidā Kamen Raidā Taisen Fīcharingu Sūpā Sentai) was released in Japanese theaters on March 29, 2014.

== S.I.C. Hero Saga ==
The S.I.C. Hero Saga story for Kamen Rider X was published in Monthly Hobby Japan magazine in its July to September 2009 issues. The story was titled Masked Rider X: Son of Zeus (MASKED RIDER X -ゼウスの息子-, Kamen Raidā Ekkusu: Zeusu no Musuko).

Chapter titles

1. Ocean Floor Temple (海底神殿, Kaitai Shinden)
2. King Dark (キングダーク, Kingu Dāku)
3. Dr. Noroi (呪博士, Noroi Hakase)

== Cast ==
- Ryo Hayami as Keisuke Jin
- Naoko Miyama as Ryoko Mizuki, Kiriko Mizuki
- Jun Tazaki as Keitaro Jin
- Akiji Kobayashi as Tōbei Tachibana
- Chisako Kosaka as Chiko
- Miyuki Hayata as Mako
- Yasuhiko Uchida as Apollogeist

=== Voice cast ===
- Osamu Saka as General of G.O.D.
- Fumio Wada as King Dark/Dr. Noroi
- Shinji Nakae as Narrator

== Songs ==
Opening theme

- "Set Up! Kamen Rider X" (セタップ！仮面ライダーX, Setappu! Kamen Raidā Ekkusu)
  - Lyrics: Shotaro Ishinomori
  - Composition: Shunsuke Kikuchi
  - Artist: Ichirou Mizuki

Ending theme

- "Ore wa X X Rider" (俺はX.X.ライダー, Ore wa X X Raidā; "I am X X Rider")
  - Lyrics: Saburo Yatsude
  - Composition: Shunsuke Kikuchi
  - Artist: Ichirou Mizuki
