= List of superhero productions created by Toei =

Toei Superheroes are superhero shows produced by Toei Company, a company that has done the largest number of live-action tokusatsu superhero shows in Japan. Many of the Toei Superheroes were featured in the video special Toei 100 Great Hero Super Fight (東映100大ヒーロー スーパーファイト) released on July 21, 1986.

Some of the series are said to be created by Saburo Yatsude (八手三郎), not an actual person, but a collective pseudonym for the staff of Toei (similar to Hajime Yatate, a name used by the staff of the Sunrise division of Japanese animation company Bandai Namco Filmworks). Others were created by Shotaro Ishinomori, which includes Kamen Rider, Gorenger and J.A.K.Q. Dengekitai for the Super Sentai series, Android Kikaider, and Inazuman, among others.

This is the complete list of Toei films and TV shows that were released and televised. It is organized by year of release date and in chronological order.

== 1950s ==
Year	English title	Japanese title	Type(s)	Note(s)
1958	Moonlight Mask	月光仮面 (Gekkō Kamen)	six films	black-and-white
1959	Planet Prince	遊星王子 (Yūsei Ōji)	two films	black-and-white
1959	Seven Color Mask	七色仮面 (Nanairo Kamen)	TV series	black-and-white

== 1960s ==
Year	English title	Japanese title	Type(s)	Note(s)
1960	Messenger of Allah	アラーの使者 (Ara no Shisha)	TV series	black-and-white
1960	National Kid	ナショナルキッド (Nashonaru Kiddo)	TV series	black-and-white; made with co-operation from Panasonic, as the series was used to advertise their products under the National brand name
1961	Invasion of the Neptune Men	宇宙快速船 (Uchū Kaisokusen)	film	black-and-white; the Japanese title translates as The Space Pirate Ship
1966	Golden Bat	黄金バット (Ōgon Batto)	film	black-and-white/ToeiScope
1966	Akuma-kun	悪魔くん(Demon-kun)	TV series	series based on Shigeru Mizuki's manga of the same name
1967	Masked Ninja Red Shadow	仮面の忍者 赤影 (Kamen no Ninja Akakage)	TV series	the first color Toei Superheroes series
1967	Space Tokusatsu Series: Captain Ultra	宇宙特撮シリーズ キャプテンウルトラ (Uchū Tokusatsu Shirīzu Kyaputen Urutora)	TV series	
1967	Giant Robo	ジャイアントロボ (Jaianto Robo)	TV series	released in the U.S. as Johnny Sokko and His Flying Robot; the last Toei Superheroes series of the 1960s; First Toei Superhero Show to feature a Giant Robot in a starring role.
1968	Kappa no Sanpei: Yokai Daisakusen	河童の三平 妖怪大作戦 (Sanpei the Kappa: The Great Yōkai Battle Plan)	TV series	the 7th episode was released as a theatrical film, also based on the work of Shigeru Mizuki

== 1970s ==
Year	English title	Japanese title	Type(s)	Note(s)
1971	Kamen Rider	仮面ライダー (Kamen Raidā)	TV series, two films	the first Toei Superheroes series of the 1970s; the first of the Kamen Rider Series and the first series in the "Showa Kamen Rider" era
1971	We Love You! We Love You!! Witch Teacher	好き！好き！！魔女先生 (Suki! Suki!! Majo Sensei)	TV series	features the superheroine Andro-Mask; the first Japanese tokusatsu superheroine series
1972	Superman Barom-1	超人バロム・1 (Chōjin Baromu Wan)	TV series	
1972	Henshin Ninja Arashi	変身忍者嵐 (Henshin Ninja Arashi)	TV series	
1972	Android Kikaider	人造人間キカイダー (Jinzōningen Kikaidā)	TV series, 3D special	
1973	Kamen Rider V3	仮面ライダーV3 (Kamen Raidā Bui Surī)	TV series, film	
1973	Kikaider 01	キカイダー01 (Kikaidā Zero Wan)	TV series	
1973	Robot Detective	ロボット刑事 (Robotto Keiji)	TV series	
1973	Inazuman	イナズマン (Inazuman)	TV series	
1974	Kamen Rider X	仮面ライダーX (Kamen Raidā Ekkusu)	TV series, film	
1974	Inazuman Flash	イナズマンF (Inazuman Furasshu)	TV series	
1974	Kamen Rider Amazon	仮面ライダーアマゾン (Kamen Raidā Amazon)	TV series	
1975	Symbol of Justice Condorman	正義のシンボル コンドールマン (Seigi no Shinboru Kondōruman)	TV series	
1975	Kamen Rider Stronger	仮面ライダーストロンガー (Kamen Raidā Sutorongā)	TV series	
1975	Himitsu Sentai Gorenger	秘密戦隊ゴレンジャー (Himitsu Sentai Gorenjā)	TV series, five films	the first of the Super Sentai Series and the first series in the "Showa Super Sentai" era
1975	Akumaizer 3	アクマイザー3 (Akumaizā Surī)	TV series	
1976	All Together! Seven Kamen Riders!!	集合!7人の仮面ライダー!! (Zen'in Shūgō! Shichinin no Kamen Raidā!!)	TV special	
1976	Space Ironmen Kyodain	宇宙鉄人キョーダイン (Uchū Tetsujin Kyōdain)	TV series	
1976	The Kagestar	ザ・カゲスター (Za Kagesutā)	TV series	
1976	Ninja Captor	忍者キャプター (Ninja Kyaputā)	TV series	
1976	Super-God Bibyun	超神ビビューン (Chōjin Bibyūn)	TV series	
1976	Guruguru Medaman	ぐるぐるメダマン(Guruguru Medaman)	TV series	Was originally not counted in the Fushigi Comedy series, but was promoted to it on Toei's official Youtube channel.
1977	Kaiketsu Zubat	快傑ズバット (Kaiketsu Zubatto)	TV series	
1977	Daitetsujin 17	大鉄人17 (Daitetsujin Wan-Sebun)	TV series	a film was also made, but it was only released in the United States under the title Brain 17; distributed by Family Home Entertainment on video in 1982; two made-for-TV films were also made, using footage from the US version, called The Defenders and The Great Brain
1977	J.A.K.Q. Dengekitai	ジャッカー(JAKQ)電撃隊 (Jakkā Dengeki Tai)	TV series, film	
1978	J.A.K.Q. Dengekitai VS Gorenger	ジャッカー電撃隊VSゴレンジャー (Jakkā Dengekitai tai Gorenjā)	film	
1978	Spider-Man	スパイダーマン (Supaidāman)	TV series	a reworking of the classic Marvel Comics superhero Spider-Man under the Marvel license; helped popularize the live-action giant robot craze in Japan
1978	Message From Space: Galactic Wars	宇宙からのメッセージ・銀河大戦 (Uchū Kara no Messēji: Ginga Taisen)	TV series	a sequel to the movie Message from Space (宇宙からのメッセージ)
1978	Tômei Dori-chan	透明ドリちゃん(Tōmei dori-chan)	TV Series	*Not counted in the Fushigi Comedy series.
1979	Battle Fever J	バトルフィーバーJ (Batoru Fībā Jei)	TV series	the third Sentai series and the first Super Sentai series; first Super Sentai series to be co-produced by Marvel Comics
1979	Kamen Rider (Skyrider)	仮面ライダー (スカイライダー) (Kamen Raidā (Sukairaidā))	TV series, film	originally titled Kamen Rider, but commonly known as Skyrider in order to separate it from the 1971 manga series with a similar name

== 1980s ==
Year	English title	Japanese title	Type(s)	Note(s)
1980	Denshi Sentai Denjiman	電子戦隊デンジマン (Denshi Sentai Denjiman)	TV series, film	second Super Sentai series co-produced by Marvel Comics and possess a Marvel copyright, despite no influence.
1980	Kamen Rider Super-1	仮面ライダースーパー1 (Kamen Raidā Sūpā Wan)	TV series, film	
1981	Taiyo Sentai Sun Vulcan	太陽戦隊サンバルカン (Taiyō Sentai Sanbarukan)	TV series, film	third and last Super Sentai series to be co-produced by Marvel Comics and possess a Marvel copyright, despite no influence.
1982	Dai Sentai Goggle Five	大戦隊ゴーグルファイブ (Dai Sentai Gōguru Faibu)	TV series, film	
1982	Space Sheriff Gavan	宇宙刑事ギャバン (Uchū Keiji Gyaban)	TV series	the first Metal Hero Series and the first series of the "Showa Metal Hero" era; the first of the Space Sheriffs series, as part of the Metal Hero series.
1983	Kagaku Sentai Dynaman	科学戦隊ダイナマン (Kagaku Sentai Dainaman)	TV series, film	six episodes from this Sentai series were used as a parody dub in USA Network's Night Flight; it was not part of the official Power Rangers canon, however
1983	Space Sheriff Sharivan	宇宙刑事シャリバン (Uchū Keiji Shariban)	TV series	
1984	Birth of the 10th! Kamen Riders All Together!!	10号誕生！ 仮面ライダー全員集合！！(Jūgō Tanjō! Kamen Raidā Zenin Shūgō!!)	TV special	this special introduces Kamen Rider ZX
1984	Nebula Mask Machine Man	星雲仮面マシンマン (Seiun Kamen Mashin Man)	TV series	
1984	Choudenshi Bioman	超電子バイオマン (Chōdenshi Baioman)	TV series, film	
1984	Space Sheriff Shaider	宇宙刑事シャイダー (Uchū Keiji Shaidā)	TV series, two films, TV special	Americanized into VR Troopers; the last of the Space Sheriffs series, as part of the Metal Hero series.
1985	Kyoudai Ken Byclosser	兄弟拳バイクロッサー (Kyoudai Ken Byclosser)	TV series	
1985	Dengeki Sentai Changeman	電撃戦隊チェンジマン (Dengeki Sentai Chenjiman)	TV series, two films	
1985	Kyojuu Tokusou Juspion	巨獣特捜ジャスピオン (Kyojuu Tokusou Juspion)	TV series	
1985	Gegege no Kitarō	ゲゲゲの鬼太郎 (Gegege no Kitaro)	Film	special film was made for the Monday Drama Land by Fuji TV
1986	Chōshinsei Flashman	超新星フラッシュマン (Chōshinsei Furasshuman)	TV series, two films	
1986	Jikuu Senshi Spielban	時空戦士スピルバン (Jikuu Senshi Spielban)	TV series	adapted into VR Troopers
1986	Gegege no Kitarō:The Demon Flute Eloim Essaim	ゲゲゲの鬼太郎 魔笛エロイムエッサイム (GeGeGe no Kitarō: Muteki Eroimu Essaimu)	Film	features a crossover with Akuma-kun
1986	Toei 100 Great Heroes Super Fight	東映100大ヒーロー スーパーファイト (Tōei Hyaku Dai Hīrō Sūpā Faito)	Film	
1987	Hikari Sentai Maskman	光戦隊マスクマン (Hikari Sentai Masukuman)	TV series, film	
1987	Choujinki Metalder	超人機メタルダー (Choujinki Metalder)	TV series, film	adapted into VR Troopers
1987	Kamen Rider Black	仮面ライダーBLACK (Kamen Raidā Burakku)	TV series, two films	
1988	Sekai Ninja Sen Jiraiya	世界忍者戦ジライヤ (Sekai Ninja Sen Jiraiya)	TV series	the last series in the "Showa Metal Hero" era
1988	Choujuu Sentai Liveman	超獣戦隊ライブマン (Chōjū Sentai Raibuman)	TV series	the last series in the "Showa Super Sentai" era
1988	Kamen Rider Black RX	仮面ライダーBLACK RX (Kamen Raidā Burakku Āru Ekkusu)	TV series, 3-D special	adapted into Masked Rider; the last series in the "Showa Kamen Rider" era
1989	The Mobile Cop Jiban	機動刑事ジバン (Kidō Keiji Jiban)	TV series, film	the first series in the "Heisei Metal Hero" era
1989	Kousoku Sentai Turboranger	高速戦隊ターボレンジャー (Kōsoku Sentai Tāborenjā)	TV series, film, special	the first series in the "Heisei Super Sentai" era

== 1990s ==
Year	English title	Japanese title	Type(s)	Note(s)
1990	La Belle Fille Masquée Poitrine	美少女仮面ポワトリン (Bishōjo Kamen Powatorin)	TV series	also part of the Toei Fushigi Comedy Series
1990	Special Rescue Police Winspector	特警ウインスペクター (Tokkei Uinsupekutā)	TV series	the first of the Police Rescue series, as part of the Metal Hero series.
1990	Chikyu Sentai Fiveman	地球戦隊ファイブマン (Chikyū Sentai Faibuman)	TV series	
1990	Lady Battle Cop	女バトルコップ (Onna Batoru Koppu)	video release	
1991	Super Rescue Solbrain	特救指令ソルブレイン (Tokkyu Shirei Soruburein)	TV series	
1991	Chōjin Sentai Jetman	鳥人戦隊ジェットマン (Chōjin Sentai Jettoman)	TV series	
1992	Special Rescue Exceedraft	特捜エクシードラフト (Tokusō Ekusī Dorahuto)	TV series	the last of the Rescue Police series, as part of the Metal Hero series.
1992	Shin Kamen Rider: Prologue	真・仮面ライダー 序章 (プロローグ) (Shin Kamen Raidā: Purorōgu)	video release	
1992	Kyōryū Sentai Zyuranger	恐竜戦隊ジュウレンジャー (Kyōryū Sentai Jūrenjā)	TV series	Americanized into Mighty Morphin Power Rangers Season 1 and the first Super Sentai series to be adapted into Power Rangers.
1993	Tokusou Robo Janperson	特捜ロボ ジャンパーソン (Tokusō Robo Janpāson)	TV series, film	
1993	Gosei Sentai Dairanger	五星戦隊ダイレンジャー (Gosei Sentai Dairenjā)	TV series, film	Americanized into Mighty Morphin Power Rangers Season 2
1993	Kamen Rider ZO	仮面ライダーZO (Kamen Raidā Zetto Ō)	film	some fight scenes were added into Masked Rider
1993	Ultraman vs. Kamen Rider	ウルトラマンVS仮面ライダー (Urutoraman tai Kamen Raidā)	TV special	a co-production with Tsuburaya Productions
1994	Blue SWAT	ブルースワット (Burū Suwatto)	TV series	
1994	Ninja Sentai Kakuranger	忍者戦隊カクレンジャー (Ninja Sentai Kakurenjā)	TV series, film	Americanized into Mighty Morphin Power Rangers Season 3 and Mighty Morphin Alien Rangers
1994	Kamen Rider J	仮面ライダーJ (Kamen Raidā Jei)	film	some fight scenes were added into Masked Rider
1994	Toei Hero Daishugō	東映ヒーロー大集合 (Tōei Hīrō Daishugō)	3D special	features Tokusou Robo Janperson, Super Sentai World (Kakuranger, Dairanger, Zyuranger, Jetman and Fiveman) and Blue SWAT
1994	Super Sentai World	スーパー戦隊 ワールド (Sūpā Sentai Wārudo)	3D special	features Kakuranger, Dairanger, Zyuranger, Jetman and Fiveman
1994	Kamen Rider World	仮面ライダーワールド (Kamen Raidā Wārudo)	3D special	features Kamen Rider ZO and Kamen Rider J
1995	Juukou B-Fighter	重甲ビーファイター (Jūkō Bī Faitā)	TV series, film	the first of the B–Fighters series, as part of the Metal Hero series.; adapted into Big Bad Beetleborgs
1995	Chōriki Sentai Ohranger	超力戦隊オーレンジャー (Chōriki Sentai Ōrenjā)	TV series, film	Americanized into Power Rangers Zeo
1995	Mechanical Violator Hakaider	人造人間ハカイダー (Jinzō Ningen Hakaidā)	film	
1996	Gekisou Sentai Carranger	激走戦隊カーレンジャー (Gekisō Sentai Kārenjā)	TV series	Americanized into Power Rangers Turbo
1996	B-Fighter Kabuto	ビーファイターカブト (Bī Faitā Kabuto)	TV series	the last of the B–Fighters series, as part of the Metal Hero series.; adapted into Beetleborgs Metallix
1996	Choukou Senshi Changéríon	超光戦士シャンゼリオン (Chōkō Senshi Shanzerion)	TV series	
1996	Chōriki Sentai Ohranger: Ohre VS Kakuranger	超力戦隊オーレンジャー オーレ VS カクレンジャー (Chōriki Sentai Ōrenjā: Ōre tai Kakurenjā)	video release	
1997	B-Robo Kabutack	ビーロボカブタック (Bī Robo Kabutakku)	TV series	the first of the Herotack series, as part of the Metal Hero series.
1997	B-Robo Kabutack: The Epic Christmas Battle	ビーロボカブタック クリスマス大決戦!! (Bī Robo Kabutakku: Kurisumasu Daikessen)	special	features Blue Beet and B-Fighter Kabuto
1997	Denji Sentai Megaranger	電磁戦隊メガレンジャー (Denji Sentai Megarenjā)	TV series	Americanized into Power Rangers in Space
1997	Gekisou Sentai Carranger vs.Ohranger	激走戦隊カーレンジャー VS オーレンジャー (Gekisō Sentai Kārenjā tai Ōrenjā)	video release	
1998	Tetsuwan Tantei Robotack	テツワン探偵ロボタック (Tetsuwan Tantei Robotakku)	TV series	the last of the Herotack series, as part of the Metal Hero series.; the last series in the "Heisei Metal Hero" era and the last Metal Hero Series until it returned in 2026 as "Reiwa Metal Hero" era.
1998	Tetsuwan Tantei Robotack and Kabutack: The Great Strange Country Adventure	テツワン探偵ロボタック&カブタック 不思議の国の大冒険 (Tetsuwan Tantei Robotakku to Kabutakku: Fushigi no Kuni no Daibōken)	special	features Kabutack
1998	Seijuu Sentai Gingaman	星獣戦隊ギンガマン (Seijū Sentai Gingaman)	TV series	Americanized into Power Rangers Lost Galaxy
1998	Denji Sentai Megaranger VS Carranger	電磁戦隊メガレンジャー VS カーレンジャー (Denji Sentai Megarenjā tai Kārenjā)	video release	
1999	Kyuukyuu Sentai GoGoFive	救急戦隊ゴーゴーファイブ (Kyūkyū Sentai Gō Gō Faibu)	TV series	Americanized into Power Rangers Lightspeed Rescue
1999	Kyuukyuu Sentai GoGoFive: Sudden Shock! A New Super Warrior	救急戦隊ゴーゴーファイブ 激突!新たなる超戦士 (Kyūkyū Sentai Gō Gō Faibu: Gekitotsu! Aratanaru Chō-Senshi)	video release	
1999	Seijuu Sentai Gingaman VS Megaranger	星獣戦隊ギンガマン VS メガレンジャー (Seijū Sentai Gingaman tai Megarenjā)	video release	

== 2000s ==
Year	English title	Japanese title	Type(s)	Note(s)
2000	Kyuukyuu Sentai GoGoFive VS Gingaman	救急戦隊ゴーゴーファイブ VS ギンガマン (Kyūkyū Sentai Gō Gō Faibu tai Gingaman)	video release	
2000	Mirai Sentai Timeranger	未来戦隊タイムレンジャー (Mirai Sentai Taimurenjā)	TV series	Americanized into Power Rangers Time Force
2000	Kamen Rider Kuuga	仮面ライダークウガ (Kamen Raidā Kūga)	TV series	the first series of the "Heisei Kamen Rider" era
2001	Mirai Sentai Timeranger VS GoGoFive	未来戦隊タイムレンジャー VS ゴーゴーファイブ (Mirai Sentai Taimurenjā: Buiesu Gō Gō Faibu)	video release	
2001	Hyakujuu Sentai Gaoranger	百獣戦隊ガオレンジャー (Hyakujū Sentai Gaorenjā	TV series	Americanized into Power Rangers Wild Force
2001	Kamen Rider Agito	仮面ライダーアギト (Kamen Raidā Agito)	TV series	
2001	Hyakujuu Sentai Gaoranger: Fire Mountain Roars	百獣戦隊ガオレンジャー 火の山、吼える (Hyakujū Sentai Gaorenjā: Hi no Yama Hoeru)	film	
2001	Kamen Rider Agito: Project G4	仮面ライダーアギト Project G4 (Kamen Raidā Agito: Purojekuto Jī Fō)	film	
2001	Hyakujuu Sentai Gaoranger VS Super Sentai	百獣戦隊ガオレンジャー VS スーパー戦隊 (Hyakujū Sentai Gaorenjā tai Super Sentai)	video release	
2002	Ninpuu Sentai Hurricaneger	忍風戦隊ハリケンジャー (Ninpū Senatai Harikenjā)	TV series	Americanized into Power Rangers Ninja Storm
2002	Kamen Rider Ryuki	仮面ライダー龍騎 (Kamen Raidā Ryūki)	TV series	Americanized into Kamen Rider: Dragon Knight
2002	Ninpuu Sentai Hurricaneger: Shushutto The Movie	忍風戦隊ハリケンジャー シュシュッとTHE MOVIE (Ninpū Senatai Harikenjā: Shushutto Za Mūbī)	film	
2002	Kamen Rider Ryuki: Episode Final	仮面ライダー龍騎 EPISODE FINAL (Kamen Raidā Ryūki: Episōdo Fainaru)	Movie	
2003	Ninpuu Sentai Hurricaneger VS Gaoranger	忍風戦隊ハリケンジャー VS ガオレンジャー (Ninpū Sentai Harikenjā tai Gaorenjā)	video release	
2003	Bakuryū Sentai Abaranger	爆竜戦隊アバレンジャー (Bakuryū Sentai Abarenjā)	TV series	Americanized into Power Rangers Dino Thunder
2003	Kamen Rider 555	仮面ライダー555 (Kamen Raidā Faizu)	TV series	
2003	Bakuryū Sentai Abaranger Deluxe	爆竜戦隊アバレンジャーDELUXE アバレサマーはキンキン中! (Bakuryū Sentai Abarenjā Derakkusu: Abare Samā wa Kinkin-Chū)	film	
2003	Kamen Rider 555: Paradise Lost	仮面ライダー555 パラダイス・ロスト (Kamen Raidā Faizu: Paradaisu Rosuto)	film	
2003	Pretty Guardian Sailor Moon	美少女戦士セーラームーン (Bishōjo Senshi Sērā Mūn)	TV series, two direct-to-DVD specials	
2004	Bakuryū Sentai Abaranger VS Hurricaneger	爆竜戦隊アバレンジャー VS ハリケンジャー (Bakuryū Sentai Abarenjā tai Harikenjā)	video release	
2004	Tokusou Sentai Dekaranger	特捜戦隊デカレンジャー (Tokusō Sentai Dekarenjā)	TV series	Americanized into Power Rangers SPD
2004	Kamen Rider Blade	仮面ライダー剣 (Kamen Raidā Bureido)	TV series	
2004	Tokusou Sentai Dekaranger The Movie: Full Blast Action	特捜戦隊デカレンジャー THE MOVIE フルブラスト・アクション (Tokusō Sentai Dekarenjā Za Mūbī: Furu Burasuto Akushon)	film	
2004	Kamen Rider Blade: Missing Ace	仮面ライダー剣 MISSING ACE (Kamen Raidā Bureido: Missingu Ēsu)	film	
2004	Devilman	デビルマン (Debiruman)	film	
2004	Zebraman	ゼブラーマン (Zeburāman)	film	
2005	Tokusou Sentai Dekaranger VS Abaranger	特捜戦隊デカレンジャー VS アバレンジャー (Tokusō Sentai Dekarenjā tai Abarenjā)	video release	
2005	Mahou Sentai Magiranger	魔法戦隊マジレンジャー (Mahō Sentai Majirenjā)	TV series	Americanized into Power Rangers Mystic Force
2005	Kamen Rider Hibiki	仮面ライダー響鬼 (Kamen Raidā Hibiki)	TV series	
2005	Mahou Sentai Magiranger The Movie: Bride Of Infershia	魔法戦隊マジレンジャー THE MOVIE インフェルシアの花嫁 (Mahō Sentai Majirenjā Za Mūbī: Inferushia no Hanayome)	film	
2005	Kamen Rider Hibiki & The Seven Senki	仮面ライダー響鬼と7人の戦鬼 (Kamen Raidā Hibiki to Shichinin no Senki)	film	
2005	Kamen Rider The First	仮面ライダー THE FIRST (Kamen Raidā Za Fāsuto)	film	
2006	Mahou Sentai Magiranger VS Dekaranger	魔法戦隊マジレンジャー VS デカレンジャー (Mahō Sentai Majirenjā tai Dekarenjā)	video release	
2006	GoGo Sentai Boukenger	轟轟戦隊ボウケンジャー (Gōgō Sentai Bōkenjā)	TV series	Americanized into Power Rangers Operation Overdrive
2006	Kamen Rider Kabuto	仮面ライダーカブト (Kamen Raidā Kabuto)	TV series	
2006	GoGo Sentai Boukenger The Movie: The Greatest Precious	轟轟戦隊ボウケンジャー THE MOVIE 最強のプレシャス (GōGō Sentai Bōkenjā Za Mūbī: Saikyō no Pureshasu)	film	
2006	Kamen Rider Kabuto: God Speed Love	仮面ライダーカブト GOD SPEED LOVE (Kamen Raidā Kabuto: Goddo Supīdo Rabu)	film	
2007	GoGo Sentai Boukenger vs. Super Sentai	轟轟戦隊ボウケンジャー VS スーパー戦隊 (GōGō Sentai Bōkenjā tai Sūpā Sentai)	video release	
2007	Juken Sentai Gekiranger	獣拳戦隊ゲキレンジャー (Jūken Sentai Gekirenjā)	TV series	Americanized into Power Rangers Jungle Fury
2007	Kamen Rider Den-O	仮面ライダー電王 (Kamen Raidā Den'ō)	TV series	
2007	Juken Sentai Gekiranger: Nei-Nei! Hou-Hou! Hong Kong Decisive Battle	獣拳戦隊ゲキレンジャー ネイネイ!ホウホウ!香港大決戦 (Jūken Sentai Gekirenjā: Nei-Nei! Hō-Hō! Honkon Daikessen)	film	
2007	Kamen Rider Den-O: I'm Born!	仮面ライダー電王 俺、誕生！ (Kamen Raidā Den'ō Ore, Tanjō!)	film	
2007	Kamen Rider The Next	仮面ライダー THE NEXT (Kamen Raidā Za Nekusuto)	film	
2008	Juken Sentai Gekiranger vs Boukenger	獣拳戦隊ゲキレンジャー VS ボウケンジャー (Jūken Sentai Gekirenjā tai Bōkenjā)	video release	
2008	Engine Sentai Go-onger	炎神戦隊ゴーオンジャー (Enjin Sentai Gōonjā)	TV series	Americanized into Power Rangers RPM
2008	Kamen Rider Kiva	仮面ライダーキバ (Kamen Raidā Kiba)	TV series	
2008	Kamen Rider Den-O & Kiva: Climax Deka	劇場版 仮面ライダー電王&キバ クライマックス刑事（デカ） (Gekijōban Kamen Raidā Den'ō ando Kiba Kuraimakkusu Deka)	film	
2008	Engine Sentai Go-onger: Boom Boom! Bang Bang! GekijōBang!!	炎神戦隊ゴーオンジャー BUNBUN！BANBAN！劇場BANG!! (Enjin Sentai Gōonjā Bunbun! Banban! Gekijōban!!)	film	
2008	Kamen Rider Kiva: King of the Castle in the Demon World	劇場版 仮面ライダーキバ 魔界城の王 (Gekijōban Kamen Raidā Kiba Makaijō no Ō)	film	
2008	Saraba Kamen Rider Den-O: Final Countdown	劇場版 さらば仮面ライダー電王 ファイナル・カウントダウン (Gekijōban Saraba Kamen Raidā Den'ō Fainaru Kauntodaun)	film	
2009	Engine Sentai Go-onger vs. Gekiranger	劇場版 炎神戦隊ゴーオンジャー VS ゲキレンジャー (Gekijōban Enjin Sentai Gōonjā tai Gekirenjā)	film	
2009	Samurai Sentai Shinkenger	侍戦隊シンケンジャー (Samurai Sentai Shinkenjā)	TV series	Americanized into Power Rangers Samurai and Super Samurai
2009	Kamen Rider Decade	仮面ライダーディケイド (Kamen Raidā Dikeido)	TV series	
2009	Cho Kamen Rider Den-O & Decade Neo Generations: The Onigashima Warship	劇場版 超・仮面ライダー電王&ディケイド NEO ジェネレーションズ 鬼ヶ島の戦艦 (Gekijōban Chō-Kamen Raidā Den'ō ando Dikeido Neo Jenerēshonzu Onigashima no Senkan)	film	
2009	Samurai Sentai Shinkenger The Movie: The Fateful War	侍戦隊シンケンジャー銀幕版 天下分け目の戦 (Samurai Sentai Shinkenjā Ginmakuban Tenkawakeme no Tatakai)	film	
2009	Kamen Rider Decade: All Riders vs. Dai-Shocker	劇場版 仮面ライダーディケイド オールライダー対大ショッカー (Gekijōban Kamen Raidā Dikeido: Ōru Raidā tai Daishokkā)	film	
2009	Kamen Rider W	仮面ライダーW（ダブル） (Kamen Raidā Daburu)	TV series	
2009	Kamen Rider × Kamen Rider W & Decade: Movie War 2010	仮面ライダー×仮面ライダー W（ダブル）&ディケイド MOVIE大戦2010 (Kamen Raidā × Kamen Raidā: Daburu ando Dikeido Mūbī Taisen Nisenjū)	film	

== 2010s ==
Year	English title	Japanese title	Type(s)	Note(s)
2010	Samurai Sentai Shinkenger vs. Go-onger: GinmakuBang!!	侍戦隊シンケンジャーVSゴーオンジャー 銀幕BANG!! (Samurai Sentai Shinkenjā tai Gōonjā Ginmakuban	film	
2010	Tensou Sentai Goseiger	天装戦隊ゴセイジャー (Tensō Sentai Goseijā)	TV series	Americanized into Power Rangers Megaforce
2010	Samurai Sentai Shinkenger Returns: Special Act	帰ってきた侍戦隊シンケンジャー 特別幕 (Kaettekita Samurai Sentai Shinkenjā: Tokubetsu Maku)	V-Cinema release	
2010	Vengeful Zebra Mini-Skirt Police	ゼブラミニスカポリスの逆襲 (Zebura Minisuka Porisu no Gyakushū-)	V-Cinema release	
2010	Zebraman 2: Attack on Zebra City	ゼブラーマン -ゼブラシティの逆襲- (Zeburāman -Zebura Shiti no Gyakushū-)	film	
2010	Kamen Rider × Kamen Rider × Kamen Rider The Movie: Cho-Den-O Trilogy	仮面ライダー×仮面ライダー×仮面ライダー THE MOVIE 超・電王トリロジー (Kamen Raidā × Kamen Raidā × Kamen Raidā Za Mūbī: Chō Den'ō Torirojī)	film trilogy	
2010	Tensou Sentai Goseiger: Epic on the Movie	天装戦隊ゴセイジャー エピックON THEムービー (Tensō Sentai Goseijā Epikku On Za Mūbī)	film	
2010	Kamen Rider W Forever: A to Z/The Gaia Memories of Fate	仮面ライダーW（ダブル） FOREVER AtoZ/運命のガイアメモリ (Kamen Raidā Daburu Fōebā: Ē tu Zetto/Unmei no Gaia Memori)	film	
2010	Kamen Rider OOO	仮面ライダーOOO（オーズ） (Kamen Raidā Ōzu)	TV series	
2010	Kamen Rider × Kamen Rider OOO & W Featuring Skull: Movie War Core	仮面ライダー×仮面ライダーオーズ&ダブル feat．スカル MOVIE大戦CORE (Kamen Raidā × Kamen Raidā Ōzu ando Daburu fīcharingu Sukaru: Mūbī Taisen Koa)	film	
2011	Tensou Sentai Goseiger vs. Shinkenger: Epic on Ginmaku	天装戦隊ゴセイジャーVSシンケンジャー エピック on 銀幕 (Tensō Sentai Goseijā tai Shinkenjā Epikku on Ginmaku)	film	
2011	Kaizoku Sentai Gokaiger	海賊戦隊ゴーカイジャー (Kaizoku Sentai Gōkaijā)	TV series	Americanized into Power Rangers Super Megaforce
2011	Gokaiger Goseiger Super Sentai 199 Hero Great Battle	ーカイジャー ゴセイジャー スーパー戦隊199ヒーロー 大決戦 (Gōkaijā Goseijā Sūpā Sentai Hyakukyūjūkyū Hīrō Daikessen)	film	
2011	OOO, Den-O, All Riders: Let's Go Kamen Riders	オーズ・電王・オールライダー レッツゴー仮面ライダー (Ōzu Den'ō Ōru Raidā: Rettsu Gō Kamen Raidā)	film	
2011	W Returns: Kamen Rider Accel	W（ダブル） RETURNS: 仮面ライダーアクセル (Daburu Ritānzu: Kamen Raidā Akuseru)	V-Cinema release	
2011	W Returns: Kamen Rider Eternal	仮面ライダーW（ダブル） RETURNS: 仮面ライダーエターナル (Daburu Ritānzu: Kamen Raidā Etānaru)	V-Cinema release	
2011	Tensou Sentai Goseiger Returns: Last Epic - The Gosei Angels are National Idols!?	帰ってきた天装戦隊ゴセイジャー last epic ～護星天使が国民的アイドルに？！～(Kaettekita Tensō Sentai Goseijā: Rasuto Epikku ~Gosei Tenshi ga Kokuminteki Aidoru ni?!~)	V-Cinema release	
2011	Kamen Rider OOO Wonderful: The Shogun and the 21 Core Medals	劇場版 仮面ライダーオーズ WONDERFUL 将軍と21のコアメダル (Gekijōban Kamen Raidā Ōzu Wandafuru: Shōgun to Nijū-ichi no Koa Medaru)	film	
2011	Kaizoku Sentai Gokaiger the Movie: The Flying Ghost Ship	海賊戦隊ゴーカイジャーTHE MOVIE 空飛ぶ幽霊船 (Kaizoku Sentai Gōkaijā Za Mūbī Sora Tobu Yūreisen)	film	
2011	Kamen Rider Fourze	仮面ライダーフォーゼ (Kamen Raidā Fōze)	TV series	
2011	Kamen Rider × Kamen Rider Fourze & OOO: Movie War Mega Max	仮面ライダー×仮面ライダー フォーゼ&オーズ MOVIE大戦 MEGA MAX (Kamen Raidā × Kamen Raidā Fōze ando Ōzu: Mūbī Taisen Mega Makkusu)	film	
2012	Kaizoku Sentai Gokaiger vs. Space Sheriff Gavan: The Movie	海賊戦隊ゴーカイジャーVS宇宙刑事ギャバンTHE MOVIE (Kaizoku Sentai Gōkaijā Tai Uchū Keiji Gyaban Za Mūbī)	film	
2012	Unofficial Sentai Akibaranger	非公認戦隊アキバレンジャー (Hikōnin Sentai Akibarenjā)	TV series	
2012	Tokumei Sentai Go-Busters	特命戦隊ゴーバスターズ (Tokumei Sentai Gōbasutāzu)	TV series	Americanized into Power Rangers Beast Morphers (Seasons 1 and 2), which is going backwards since the series was previously skipped over
2012	Kamen Rider × Super Sentai: Super Hero Taisen	仮面ライダー×スーパー戦隊 スーパーヒーロー大戦 (Kamen Raidā × Supā Sentai Supā Hīrō Taisen)	film	
2012	Kamen Rider Fourze the Movie: Everyone, Space Is Here!	仮面ライダーフォーゼ THE MOVIE みんなで宇宙キターッ！ (Kamen Raidā Fōze Za Mūbī Minna de Uchū Kitā!)	film	
2012	Tokumei Sentai Go-Busters the Movie: Protect the Tokyo Enetower!	特命戦隊ゴーバスターズ THE MOVIE 東京エネタワーを守れ！ (Tokumei Sentai Gōbasutāzu Za Mūbī Tōkyō Enetawā o Mamore!)	film	
2012	Kamen Rider Wizard	仮面ライダーウィザード (Kamen Raidā Wizādo)	TV series	
2012	Space Sheriff Gavan: The Movie	宇宙刑事ギャバンTHE MOVIE (Uchū Keiji Gyaban Za Mūbī)	film	
2012	Kamen Rider × Kamen Rider Wizard & Fourze: Movie War Ultimatum	仮面ライダー×仮面ライダー ウィザード&フォーゼ MOVIE大戦アルティメイタム (Kamen Raidā × Kamen Raidā Wizādo Ando Fōze Mūbī Taisen Arutimeitamu)	film	
2013	Tokumei Sentai Go-Busters vs. Kaizoku Sentai Gokaiger: The Movie	特命戦隊ゴーバスターズVS海賊戦隊ゴーカイジャーTHE MOVIE (Tokumei Sentai Gōbasutāzu Tai Kaizoku Sentai Gōkaijā Za Mūbī)	film	
2013	Unofficial Sentai Akibaranger: Season Two	非公認戦隊アキバレンジャー シーズン痛（ツー） (Hikōnin Sentai Akibaranger: Shīzun Tsū)	TV series	
2013	Zyuden Sentai Kyoryuger	獣電戦隊キョウリュウジャー (Jūden Sentai Kyōryūjā)	TV series	Americanized into Power Rangers Dino Charge and Dino Super Charge
2013	Kamen Rider × Super Sentai × Space Sheriff: Super Hero Taisen Z	仮面ライダー×スーパー戦隊×宇宙刑事 スーパーヒーロー大戦Z (Kamen Raidā × Sūpā Sentai × Uchū Keiji: Supā Hīrō Taisen Zetto)	film	
2013	Kamen Rider Wizard in Magic Land	劇場版 仮面ライダーウィザード in Magic Land (Gekijōban Kamen Raidā Wizādo In Majikku Rando)	film	
2013	Zyuden Sentai Kyoryuger: Gaburincho of Music	劇場版 獣電戦隊キョウリュウジャー GABURINCHO OF MUSIC (Gekijōban Jūden Sentai Kyōryūjā Gaburincho Obu Myūjikku)	film	
2013	Tokumei Sentai Go-Busters Returns vs. Dōbutsu Sentai Go-Busters	帰ってきた特命戦隊ゴーバスターズ VS 動物戦隊ゴーバスターズ (Kaettekita Tokumei Sentai Gōbasutāzu Tai Dōbutsu Sentai Gōbasutāzu)	V-Cinema release	
2013	Nimpuu Sentai Hurricaneger: 10 Years After	忍風戦隊ハリケンジャー 10 YEARS AFTER (Ninpū Sentai Harikenjā Ten Iyāzu Afutā)	V-Cinema release	
2013	Kamen Rider Gaim	仮面ライダー鎧武（ガイム） (Kamen Raidā Gaimu)	TV series	
2013	Kamen Rider × Kamen Rider Gaim & Wizard: The Fateful Sengoku Movie Battle	仮面ライダー×仮面ライダー鎧武&ウィザード 天下分け目の戦国MOVIE大合戦 (Kamen Raidā × Kamen Raidā Gaimu Ando Wizādo Tenkawakeme no Sengoku Mūbī Daigassen)	film	
2014	Zyuden Sentai Kyoryuger vs. Go-Busters: The Great Dinosaur Battle! Farewell Our Eternal Friends	獣電戦隊キョウリュウジャーVSゴーバスターズ 恐竜大決戦！ さらば永遠の友よ (Jūden Sentai Kyōryūjā tai Gōbasutāzu: Kyōryū Daikessen! Saraba Eien no Tomo yo)	film	
2014	Ressha Sentai ToQger	烈車戦隊トッキュウジャー(Ressha Sentai Tokkyūjā)	TV series	one of many minimal costume and prop elements that was recycled into Power Rangers Ninja Steel, Super Ninja Steel and Dino Fury (season 2)
2014	Zyuden Sentai Kyoryuger: 100 Years After	帰ってきた獣電戦隊キョウリュウジャー 100 YEARS AFTER (Kaettekita Jūden Sentai Kyōryūjā Handoreddo Iyāzu Afutā)	V-Cinema release	
2014	Heisei Riders vs. Shōwa Riders: Kamen Rider Taisen feat. Super Sentai	平成ライダー対昭和ライダー 仮面ライダー大戦 feat.スーパー戦隊 (Heisei Raidā Tai Shōwa Raidā Kamen Raidā Taisen Fiucharingu Sūpā Sentai)	film	
2014	Ressha Sentai ToQger the Movie: Galaxy Line S.O.S.	烈車戦隊トッキュウジャー THE MOVIE ギャラクシーライン SOS (Ressha Sentai Tokkyūjā THE MOVIE Gyarakushī Rain SOS)	film	
2014	Kamen Rider Gaim: Great Soccer Battle! Golden Fruits Cup!	劇場版 仮面ライダー鎧武 サッカー大決戦!黄金の果実争奪杯（カップ）! (Gekijōban Kamen Raidā Gaimu Sakkā Daikessen! Ōgon no Kajitsu Sōdatsu Kappu!)	film	
2014	Kamen Rider Drive	仮面ライダードライブ (Kamen Raidā Doraibu)	TV series	
2014	Kamen Rider × Kamen Rider Drive & Gaim: Movie War Full Throttle	仮面ライダー×仮面ライダードライブ&鎧武 MOVIE大戦フルスロットル (Kamen Raidā × Kamen Raidā Doraibu Ando Gaimu Mūbī Taisen Furu Surottoru)	film	
2015	Ressha Sentai ToQger vs. Kyoryuger: The Movie	烈車戦隊トッキュウジャーVSキョウリュウジャーTHE MOVIE (Ressha Sentai Tokkyūjā tai Kyōryūjā Za Mūbī)	film	
2015	Shuriken Sentai Ninninger	手裏剣戦隊ニンニンジャー(Shuriken Sentai Ninninjā)	TV series	Americanized into Power Rangers Ninja Steel and Super Ninja Steel
2015	Super Hero Taisen GP: Kamen Rider 3	スーパーヒーロー大戦GP 仮面ライダー3号 (Supā Hīrō Taisen Guranpuri: Kamen Raidā Sangō)	film	
2015	Gaim Gaiden: Kamen Rider Zangetsu/Kamen Rider Baron	鎧武(ガイム)外伝: 仮面ライダー斬月/仮面ライダーバロン (Gaimu Gaiden: Kamen Raidā Zangetsu/Kamen Raidā Baron)	V-Cinema release	
2015	They Went and Came Back Again Ressha Sentai ToQGer: Super ToQ 7gou of Dreams	行って帰ってきた烈車戦隊トッキュウジャー 夢の超トッキュウ7号 (Itte Kaettekita Ressha Sentai Tokkyūjā Yume no Chō Tokkyū Nana-gō)	V-Cinema release	
2015	Shuriken Sentai Ninninger the Movie: The Dinosaur Lord's Splendid Ninja Scroll!	手裏剣戦隊ニンニンジャー THE MOVIE 恐竜殿さまアッパレ忍法帖！ (Shuriken Sentai Ninninjā Za Mūbī Kyōryū Tono-sama Appare Ninpōchō!)	film	
2015	Kamen Rider Drive: Surprise Future	劇場版 仮面ライダードライブ サプライズ・フューチャー (Gekijōban Kamen Raidā Doraibu: Sapuraizu Fyūchā)	film	
2015	Kamen Rider Ghost	仮面ライダーゴースト (Kamen Raidā Gōsuto)	TV series	
2015	Tokusou Sentai Dekaranger: 10 Years After	特捜戦隊デカレンジャー 10 YEARS AFTER (Tokusō Sentai Dekarenjā: Ten Iyāzu Afutā)	V-Cinema release	
2015	Gaim Gaiden: Kamen Rider Duke/Kamen Rider Knuckle	鎧武(ガイム)外伝: 仮面ライダーデューク/仮面ライダーナックル (Gaimu Gaiden: Kamen Raidā Dyūku/Kamen Raidā Nakkuru)	V-Cinema release	
2015	Kamen Rider × Kamen Rider Ghost & Drive: Super Movie War Genesis	仮面ライダー×仮面ライダー ゴースト&ドライブ 超MOVIE大戦ジェネシス (Kamen Raidā × Kamen Raidā Gōsuto Ando Doraibu Chō Mūbī Taisen Jeneshisu)	film	
2016	Shuriken Sentai Ninninger vs. ToQger the Movie: Ninja in Wonderland	手裏剣戦隊ニンニンジャーVSトッキュウジャー THE MOVIE 忍者・イン・ワンダーランド (Shuriken Sentai Ninninjā tai Tokkyūjā Za Mūbī Ninja In Wandārando)	film	
2016	Doubutsu Sentai Zyuohger	動物戦隊ジュウオウジャー (Dōbutsu Sentai Jūōjā)	TV series	one of many minimal costume and prop elements that was recycled into Power Rangers Cosmic Fury*; Later Americanized as the YouTube series Power Rangers Beast Hunters
2016	Kamen Rider 1	仮面ライダー1号 (Kamen Raidā Ichigō)	film	
2016	Drive Saga: Kamen Rider Chaser	ドライブサーガ 仮面ライダーチェイサー (Doraibu Sāga Kamen Raidā Cheisā)	V-Cinema release	
2016	Shuriken Sentai Ninninger Returns: Ninnin Girls vs. Boys Final Wars	帰ってきた手裏剣戦隊ニンニンジャー ニンニンガールズVSボーイズ FINAL WARS (Kaettekita Shuriken Sentai Ninninjā Ninnin Gāruzu Tai Bōizu Fainaru Wōzu)	V-Cinema release	
2016	Doubutsu Sentai Zyuohger the Movie: The Exciting Circus Panic!	劇場版 手裏剣戦隊ニンニンジャー ドキドキ サーカス パニック！ (Gekijōban Dōbutsu Sentai Jūōjā Dokidoki Sākasu Panikku!)	film	
2016	Kamen Rider Ghost: The 100 Eyecons and Ghost's Fated Moment	劇場版 仮面ライダーゴースト 100の眼魂とゴースト運命の瞬間 (Gekijōban Kamen Raidā Gōsuto Hyaku no Aikon to Gōsuto Unmei no Shunkan)	film	
2016	Kamen Rider Amazons	仮面ライダーアマゾンズ (Kamen Raidā Amazonzu)	web series	
2016	Kamen Rider Ex-Aid	仮面ライダーエグゼイド (Kamen Raidā Eguzeido)	TV series	
2016	Drive Saga: Kamen Rider Mach/Kamen Rider Heart	ドライブサーガ 仮面ライダーマッハ/仮面ライダーハート (Doraibu Sāga Kamen Raidā Cheisā/Kamen Raidā Hāto)	V-Cinema release	
2016	Cutie Honey: -Tears-	キューティー・ハニー ティアーズ (Kyūtī Hanī Tiāzu)	film	
2016	Kamen Rider Heisei Generations: Dr. Pac-Man vs. Ex-Aid & Ghost with Legend Rider	仮面ライダー平成ジェネレーションズ Dr.パックマン対エグゼイド&ゴーストwithレジェンドライダー (Kamen Raidā Heisei Jenerēshonzu Dokutā Pakkuman Tai Eguzeido Ando Gōsuto Wizu Rejendo Raidā)	film	
2017	Doubutsu Sentai Zyuohger vs. Ninninger the Movie: Super Sentai's Message from the Future	劇場版 動物戦隊ジュウオウジャーVSニンニンジャー 未来からのメッセージfromスーパー戦隊 (Gekijōban Dōbutsu Sentai Jūōjā tai Ninninjā Mirai Kara no Messēji from Sūpā Sentai)	film	
2017	Uchuu Sentai Kyuranger	宇宙戦隊キュウレンジャー (Uchū Sentai Kyuurenjā)	TV series	Americanized into Power Rangers Cosmic Fury, which is going backwards since the series was previously skipped over
2017	Kamen Rider × Super Sentai: Ultra Super Hero Taisen	仮面ライダー×スーパー戦隊: 超スーパーヒーロー大戦 (Kamen Raidā × Supā Sentai Chō Supā Hīrō Taisen)	film	
2017	Zyuden Sentai Kyoryuger Brave	獣電戦隊キョウリュウジャーブレイブ (Jūden Sentai Kyōryūjā Bureibu)	TV series	
2017	Ghost Re:Birth: Kamen Rider Specter	ゴーストRE:BIRTH 仮面ライダースペクター (Gōsuto Ribāsu Kamen Raidā Supekutā)	V-Cinema release	
2017	Space Squad	スペース・スクワッド (Supēsu Sukuwado)	V-Cinema release	
2017	Doubutsu Sentai Zyuohger Returns: Give Me Your Life! Earth Champion Tournament	帰ってきた動物戦隊ジュウオウジャー お命頂戴！地球王者決定戦 (Kaettekita Dōbutsu Sentai Jūōjā Oinochi Chōdai! Chikyū Ōja Ketteisen)	V-Cinema release	
2017	Uchu Sentai Kyuranger the Movie: Gase Indaver Strikes Back	宇宙戦隊キュウレンジャー THE MOVIE ゲース・インダベーの逆襲 (Uchū Sentai Kyūrenjā Za Mūbī Gēsu Indabē no Gyakushū)	film	
2017	Kamen Rider Ex-Aid the Movie: True Ending	劇場版 仮面ライダーエグゼイド トゥルー・エンディング (Gekijōban Kamen Raidā Eguzeido: Turū Endingu)	film	
2017	Kamen Rider Build	仮面ライダービルド (Kamen Raidā Birudo)	TV series	
2017	Uchu Sentai Kyuranger: Episode of Stinger	宇宙戦隊キュウレンジャー Episode of スティンガー (Uchū Sentai Kyūrenjā Episōdo Obu Sutingā)	V-Cinema release	
2017	Kamen Rider Heisei Generations Final: Build & Ex-Aid with Legend Rider	仮面ライダー平成ジェネレーションズ FINAL ビルド&エグゼイドwithレジェンドライダー (Kamen Raidā Heisei Jenerēshonzu Fainaru Birudo Ando Eguzeido Wizu Rejendo Raidā)	film	
2018	Kamen Rider Ex-Aid Trilogy: Another Ending	仮面ライダーエグゼイド トリロジー アナザー・エンディング (Kamen Raidā Eguzeido Torirojī Anazā Endingu)	V-Cinema release	
2018	Kaitou Sentai Lupinranger VS Keisatsu Sentai Patranger	快盗戦隊ルパンレンジャーVS警察戦隊パトレンジャー (Kaitō Sentai Rupanrenjā Bui Esu Keisatsu Sentai Patorenjā)	TV series	one of many minimal costume and prop elements that was recycled into Power Rangers Cosmic Fury
2018	Kamen Rider Amazons the Movie: The Last Judgement	仮面ライダーアマゾンズ THE MOVIE 最後ノ審判 (Kamen Raidā Amazonzu Za Mūbī Saigo no Shinpan)	film	
2018	Kamen Rider Build the Movie: Be The One	劇場版 仮面ライダービルド Be The One (Gekijōban Kamen Raidā Birudo Bī Za Wan)	film	
2018	Kaitou Sentai Lupinranger vs. Keisatsu Sentai Patranger en Film	快盗戦隊ルパンレンジャーVS警察戦隊パトレンジャー en film (Kaitō Sentai Rupanrenjā Bui Esu Keisatsu Sentai Patorenjā An Firumu)	film	
2018	Uchu Sentai Kyuranger vs. Space Squad	宇宙戦隊キュウレンジャーVSスペース・スクワッド (Uchū Sentai Kyūrenjā Bāsasu Supēsu Sukuwaddo)	V-Cinema release	
2018	Kamen Rider Zi-O	仮面ライダージオウ (Kamen Raidā Jiou)	TV series	the last series in the "Heisei Kamen Rider" era
2018	Engine Sentai Go-onger: 10 Years Grand Prix	炎神戦隊ゴーオンジャー 10 YEARS GRANDPRIX (Enjin Sentai Gōonjā Ten Iyāzu Guran Puri)	V-Cinema release	
2018	Kamen Rider Heisei Generations Forever	仮面ライダー平成ジェネレーションズ FOREVER (Kamen Raidā Heisei Jenerēshonzu Fōebā)	film	
2019	Build New World: Kamen Rider Cross-Z	ビルド NEW WORLD 仮面ライダークローズ (Birudo Nyū Wārudo Kamen Raidā Kurōzu)	V-Cinema release	
2019	4 Week Continuous Special Super Sentai Strongest Battle!!	4週連続スペシャル スーパー戦隊最強バトル!! (Yon-shū Renzoku Supesharu Sūpā Sentai Saikyō Batoru!!)	miniseries	
2019	Kishiryu Sentai Ryusoulger	騎士竜戦隊リュウソウジャー (Kishiryū Sentai Ryūsoujā)	TV series	the last series in the "Heisei Super Sentai" era; Americanized into Power Rangers Dino Fury (Seasons 1 and 2)
2019	Drive Saga: Kamen Rider Brain	ドライブサーガ 仮面ライダーブレン (Doraibu Sāga Kamen Raidā Buren)	miniseries	
2019	Lupinranger VS Patranger VS Kyuranger	ルパンレンジャーVSパトレンジャーVSキュウレンジャー (Rupanrenjā Bui Esu Patorenjā Bui Esu Kyūrenjā)	V-Cinema release	
2019	Kamen Rider Zi-O the Movie: Over Quartzer	劇場版 仮面ライダージオウ Over Quartzer (Gekijōban Kamen Raidā Jiō Ōvā Kwōtsā)	film	
2019	Kishiryu Sentai Ryusoulger the Movie: Time Slip! Dinosaur Panic	騎士竜戦隊リュウソウジャー THE MOVIE タイムスリップ！恐竜パニック!! (Kishiryū Sentai Ryūsōjā Za Mūbī Taimu Surippu! Kyōryū Panikku!!)	film	
2019	Kamen Rider Zero-One	仮面ライダーゼロワン (Kamen Raidā Zerowan)	TV series	the first series in the "Reiwa Kamen Rider" era
2019	Build New World: Kamen Rider Grease	ビルド NEW WORLD 仮面ライダーグリス (Birudo Nyū Wārudo Kamen Raidā Gurisu)	V-Cinema release	
2019	Kamen Rider Reiwa The First Generation	仮面ライダー 令和 ザ・ファースト・ジェネレーション (Kamen Raidā Reiwa Za Fāsuto Jenerēshon)	film	

== 2020s ==
Year	English title	Japanese title	Type(s)	Note(s)
2020	Kamen Rider Zi-O Next Time: Geiz, Majesty	仮面ライダージオウ NEXT TIME ゲイツ、マジェスティ (Kamen Raidā Jiō Nekusuto Taimu Geitsu, Majesuti)	V-Cinema release	
2020	Kishiryu Sentai Ryusoulger VS Lupinranger VS Patranger	劇場版 騎士竜戦隊リュウソウジャーVSルパンレンジャーVSパトレンジャー (Gekijōban Kishiryū Sentai Ryūsōjā Bui Esu Rupanrenjā Bui Esu Patorenjā)	film	
2020	Mashin Sentai Kiramager Episode ZERO	魔進戦隊キラメイジャー エピソードZERO (Mashin Sentai Kirameijā Episōdo Zero)	film	
2020	Mashin Sentai Kiramager	魔進戦隊キラメイジャー (Mashin Sentai Kirameijā)	TV series	the first series in the "Reiwa Super Sentai" era
2020	Kamen Rider Saber	仮面ライダーセイバー/聖刃 (Kamen Raidā Seibā)	TV series	
2020	Kamen Rider Zero-One the Movie: Real×Time	劇場版 仮面ライダーゼロワン REAL×TIME (Gekijōban Kamen Raidā Zero Wan Riaru Taimu)	film	
2020	Kamen Rider Saber Theatrical Short Story: The Phoenix Swordsman and the Book of Ruin	劇場短編 仮面ライダーセイバー 不死鳥の剣士と破滅の本 (Gekijō Tanpen Kamen Raidā Seibā Fushichō no Kenshi to Hametsu no Hon)	film	
2021	Mashin Sentai Kiramager The Movie Bee-Bop Dream	魔進戦隊キラメイジャー THE MOVIE ビー・バップ・ドリーム (Mashin Sentai Kirameijā Za Mūbī: Bī-Bappu Dorīmu)	film	
2021	Kishiryu Sentai Ryusoulger Special Chapter: Memory of Soulmates	騎士竜戦隊リュウソウジャー 特別編 メモリー・オブ・ソウルメイツ (Kishiryū Sentai Ryūsōjā Tokubetsuhen Memorī Obu Sōrumeitsu)	film	
2021	Kikai Sentai Zenkaiger the Movie: Red Fight! All Sentai Great Assemble!!	機界戦隊ゼンカイジャー THE MOVIE 赤い戦い！オール戦隊大集会!! (Kikai Sentai Zenkaijā Za Mūbī Akai Tatakai! Ōru Sentai Daishūkai!!)	film	
2021	Kikai Sentai Zenkaiger	機界戦隊ゼンカイジャー (Kikai Sentai Zenkaijā)	TV series	
2021	The High School Heroes	ザ・ハイスクール ヒーローズ (Za Haisukūru Hīrōzu)	TV series	
2021	Zero-One Others: Kamen Rider MetsubouJinrai	ゼロワン Others 仮面ライダー滅亡迅雷 (Zerowan Azāzu: Kamen Raidā Metsuboujinrai)	V-Cinema release	
2021	Saber + Zenkaiger: Superhero Senki	セイバー+ゼンカイジャー スーパーヒーロー戦記 (Seibā Zenkaijā Sūpāhīrō Senki)	film	
2021	Kamen Rider Revice the Movie	劇場版 仮面ライダーリバイス (Gekijōban Kamen Raidā Ribaisu)	Short Film	
2021	Kamen Rider Revice	仮面ライダーリバイス (Kamen Raidā Ribaisu)	TV series	
2021	Zero-One Others: Kamen Rider Vulcan & Valkyrie	ゼロワン Others 仮面ライダーバルカン&バルキリー (Zerowan Azāzu: Kamen Raidā Barukan Ando Barukirī)	V-Cinema release	
2021	Kaizoku Sentai: Ten Gokaiger	海賊戦隊テンゴーカイジャー (Kaizoku Sentai Ten Gōkaijā)	V-Cinema release	
2021	Super Battle Junretsuger	スーパー戦闘 純烈ジャー,(Sūpā Sentō Junretsujā)	film	
2021	Kamen Rider: Beyond Generations	仮面ライダー ビヨンド・ジェネレーションズ,(Kamen Raidā Biyondo Jenerēshonzu)	film	
2022	Kamen Rider Saber: Trio of Deep Sin	仮面ライダーセイバー 深罪の三重奏トリオ, (Kamen Raidā Seibā Shinzai no Torio)	V-Cinema release	
2022	Avataro Sentai Donbrothers	暴太郎戦隊ドンブラザーズ (Abatarō Sentai Donburazāzu)	TV series	
2022	Kikai Sentai Zenkaiger vs. Kiramager vs. Senpaiger	機界戦隊ゼンカイジャーVSキラメイジャーVSセンパイジャー, (Kikai Sentai Zenkaijā Tai Kirameijā Tai Senpaijā)	V-Cinema release	
2022	Kamen Rider Revice: Battle Familia	劇場版 劇場版仮面ライダーリバイス バトルファミリア (Gekijōban Kamen Raidā Rebaisu: Batoru Famiria)	film	
2022	Avataro Sentai Donbrothers The Movie: New First Love Hero	暴太郎戦隊ドンブラザーズ THE MOVIE 新・初恋ヒーロー (Abatarō Sentai Donburazāzu Za Mūbī: Shin Hatsukoi Hīrō)	film	
2022	Kamen Rider Geats	仮面ライダーギーツ (Kamen Raidā Gītsu)	TV series	
2022	Kamen Rider Black Sun	仮面ライダーBLACK SUN (Kamen Raidā Burakku San)	TV series	
2022	Kamen Rider Geats × Revice: Movie Battle Royale	仮面ライダーギーツ×リバイス MOVIEバトルロワイヤル (Kamen Raidā Gītsu Ribaisu Mūbī Batoru Rowaiyaru)	film	
2023	Revice Forward: Kamen Rider Live & Evil & Demons	リバイスForward 仮面ライダーライブ&エビル&デモンズ (Ribaisu Fowādo Kamen Raidā Raibu Ando Ebiru Ando Demonzu)	V-Cinema release	
2023	Ohsama Sentai King-Ohger	王おう様さま戦セン隊タイキングオージャー (Ō-Sama Sentai Kingu-Ōjā)	TV series	
2023	Shin Kamen Rider	シン・仮面ライダー (Shin Kamen Raidā)	film	
2023	Avataro Sentai Donbrothers vs. Zenkaiger	暴太郎戦隊ドンブラザーズVSゼンカイジャー (Abatarō Sentai Donburazāzu Tai Zenkaijā)	V-Cinema release	
2023	Ninpuu Sentai Hurricaneger de Gozaru! Shushutto 20th Anniversary	忍風戦隊ハリケンジャーでござる！シュシュッと20th Anniversary (Ninpū Sentai Harikenjā de Gozaru! Shushutto Tuentīsu Anibāsarī)	V-Cinema release	
2023	Kamen Rider Geats the Movie: The 4 Aces and the Black Fox	映画 仮面ライダーギーツ 4人のエースと黒狐 (Eiga Kamen Raidā Gītsu Yo-nin no Ēsu to Kurogitsune)	film	
2023	Ohsama Sentai King-Ohger: Adventure Heaven	映画 王様戦隊キングオージャー アドベンチャー・ヘブン (Eiga Ō-Sama Sentai Kingu-Ōjā: Adobenchā Hebun)	film	
2023	Kamen Rider Gotchard	仮面ライダーガッチャード (Kamen Raidā Gatchādo)	TV series	
2023	Bakuryū Sentai Abaranger 20th: The Unforgivable Abare	爆竜戦隊アバレンジャー 20th 許されざるアバレ (Bakuryū Sentai Abarenjā Tuentīsu Yurusarezaru Abare)	V-Cinema release	
2023	Kamen Rider the Winter Movie: Gotchard & Geats Strongest Chemy ★ Gotcha Great Operation	仮面ライダー THE WINTER MOVIE ガッチャード&ギーツ 最強ケミー★ガッチャ大作戦 (Kamen Raidā Za Wintā Mūbī Gatchādo Ando Gītsu Saikyō Kemī Gatcha Dai Sakusen)	film	
2024	Kamen Rider 555 20th: Paradise Regained	仮面ライダー555 20th パラダイス・リゲインド (Kamen Raidā Faizu Nijusshūnen: Paradaisu Rigeindo)	V-Cinema release	
2024	Kamen Rider Geats: Jyamato Awaking	仮面ライダーギーツ ジャマト・アウェイキング (Kamen Raidā Gītsu: Jamato Aweikingu)	V-Cinema release	
2024	Bakuage Sentai Boonboomger	爆上戦隊ブンブンジャー (Bakuage Sentai Bunbunjā)	TV Series	
2024	Ohsama Sentai King-Ohger vs. Donbrothers	王様戦隊キングオージャーVSドンブラザーズ (Ōsama Sentai Kinguōjā Tai Donburazāzu)	V-Cinema release	
2024	Ohsama Sentai King-Ohger vs. Kyoryuger	王様戦隊キングオージャーVSキョウリュウジャー (Ōsama Sentai Kinguōjā Tai Kyōryūjā)	V-Cinema release	
2024	Tokusou Sentai Dekaranger 20th: Fireball Booster	特捜戦隊デカレンジャー 20th ファイヤーボール・ブースター (Tokusō Sentai Dekarenjā Tuentīsu Faiyābōru Būsutā)	V-Cinema release	
2024	Kamen Rider Gotchard: The Future Daybreak	仮面ライダーガッチャード ザ・フューチャー・デイブレイク (Kamen Raidā Gatchādo Za Fyūchā Deibureiku)	film	
2024	Bakuage Sentai Boonboomger GekijōBoon! Promise the Circuit	爆上戦隊ブンブンジャー 劇場BOON！ プロミス・ザ・サーキット (Bakuage Sentai Bunbunjā Gekijōbūn! Puromisu Za Sākitto)	film	
2024	Kamen Rider Gavv	仮面ライダーガヴ (Kamen Raidā Gavu)	TV Series	
2024	Wing-Man	ウイングマン (Uinguman)	TV Series	
2025	No.1 Sentai Gozyuger	ナンバーワン戦隊ゴジュウジャー (Nanbāwan Sentai Gojūjā)	TV Series	the last series in the "Reiwa Super Sentai" era and Super Sentai Series would go on a hiatus.
2025	Kamen Rider Gotchard: Graduations	仮面ライダーガッチャード GRADUATIONS (Kamen Raidā Gurajuēshonzu)	V-Cinema release	
2025	Hopper1's Spring Vacation	ホッパー1のはるやすみ (Hoppā Wan no Haruyasumi)	V-Cinema release	
2025	Bakuage Sentai Boonboomger vs. King-Ohger	特爆上戦隊ブンブンジャーVSキングオージャー (Bakuage Sentai Bunbunjā Tai Kinguōjā)	V-Cinema release	
2025	Gochizo's Summer Vacation	ゴチゾウのなつやすみ (Gochizō no Natsu Yasumi)	film	
2025	Kamen Rider Gavv: Invaders of the House of Snacks	仮面ライダーガヴ お菓子の家の侵略者 (Kamen Raidā Gavu Okashi no Ie no Shinryakusha)	film	
2025	No.1 Sentai Gozyuger: Tega Sword of Resurrection	ナンバーワン戦隊ゴジュウジャー 復活のテガソード (Nanbā Wan Sentai Gojūjā Fukkatsu no Tega Sōdo)	film	
2025	Kamen Rider ZEZTZ	仮面ライダーゼッツ (Kamen Raidā Zettsu)	TV Series	
2025	Gochizo Morning Assembly	仮面ライダーガヴギルティ・パルフェ (Gochizō Chōrei)	V-Cinema release	
2025	Kamen Rider Gavv: Guilty Parfait	ゴチゾウちょうれい (Kamen Raidā Gavu: Giruti parufe)	V-Cinema release	
2026	Super Space Sheriff Gavan Infinity	超宇宙刑事ギャバン インフィニティ (Chō Uchū Keiji Gyaban Infiniti)	TV Series	the first of the Project R.E.D. Series, as part of the return of the Metal Heroes series.; based on the first entry in the Metal Hero Series, as being "Reiwa Metal Hero" era.
2026	No.1 Sentai Gozyuger vs. Boonboomger	ナンバーワン戦隊ゴジュウジャーVSブンブンジャー (Nanbā Wan Sentai Gojūjā Tai Bunbunjā)	V-Cinema release	
2026	Agito: Psychic War	アギト—超能力戦争— (Agito Chōnōryoku Sensō)	film	
2026	Kamen Rider ZEZTZ: Farewell Mission	仮面ライダーゼッツ さよならのミッション (Kamen Raidā Zettsu Sayonara no Misshon)	film	
2026	Super Space Sheriff Gavan Infinity: The Day the Sun Cried	超宇宙刑事ギャバン インフィニティ 太陽が泣いた日 (Chō Uchū Keiji Gyaban Infiniti Taiyō ga Naita Hi)	film	
2026	Kakuseihunter Omegahorn	角醒ハンターオメガホーン (Kakusei Hantā Omegahōn)	TV Series	
2026	Kamen Rider MY-TH	仮面ライダーマイス (Kamen Raidā Maisu)	TV Series	
2026	Kamen Rider Kabuto 20th: Inheritor of Heaven	仮面ライダーカブト 20th 天を継ぐもの (Kamen Raidā Kabuto Nijusshūnen Ten o Tsugu Mono)	V-Cinema release	
2026	Super Space Sheriff Gavan Infinity vs. Raiya	超宇宙刑事ギャバン インフィニティVSライヤ (Chō Uchū Keiji Gyaban Infiniti Tai Raiya)	V-Cinema release	

== Notes ==
=== Works cited ===
- Galbraith IV, Stuart (1994). Japanese Science Fiction, Fantasy and Horror Films. McFarland. ISBN 0-89950-853-7.
