= Jiro Okamoto =

Japanese veteran suit actor (born 1965)

Jiro Okamoto (岡元 次郎, Okamoto Jirō) (born January 5, 1965) is a Japanese veteran suit actor. He did some stunt work for Kamen Rider Series, Super Sentai and Metal Hero.

== Stunt/suit actor roles ==
=== Super Sentai series ===
- Dengeki Sentai Changeman (1985-1986) - Hidrer Soldiers
- Kyoryu Sentai Zyuranger (1992-1993) - Dragon Ranger
- Denji Sentai Megaranger (1997-1998) - Mega Black
- Seijuu Sentai Gingaman (1998-1999) - Ginga Blue, Gingarilla, Captain Zahab, Gingaoh
- Kyuukyuu Sentai GoGoFive (1999-2000) - Victory Mars, Grand Liner
- Ninpuu Sentai Hurricanger (2002-2003) - Fake HurricaneRed
- Bakuryuu Sentai Abaranger (2003-2004) - Abare Black
- Tokusou Sentai Dekaranger (2004-2005) - Igaroid
- Mahou Sentai Magiranger (2005-2006) - Magi Shine, Sunjiel, Buranken, Drake, Dagon, Travelion
- GoGo Sentai Boukenger (2006-2007) - Dai Bouken, Ryuuwon, Super Dai Bouken, Ultimate Dai Bouken, Yaiba, DaiVoyager
- Juken Sentai Gekiranger (2007-2008) - Land Fist Demon Maku
- Engine Sentai Go-onger (2008-2009) - Yogoshimacritein, Kyoretsu-Oh
- Samurai Sentai Shinkenger (2009-2010) - Shinken Gold, Daikaioh, Mougyudaioh
- Tensou Sentai Goseiger (2010-2011) - Gosei Knight, Dereputa, Gosei Ground
- Kaizoku Sentai Gokaiger (2011-2012) - Barizorg, Akudos Gill
- Tokumei Sentai Go-Busters (2012-2013) - Gorisaki Banana
- Zyuden Sentai Kyoryuger (2013-2014) - Torin, Kyoryu Silver
- Ressha Sentai ToQger (2014-2015) - General Schwarz
- Shuriken Sentai Ninninger (2015-2016) - Raizo Gabi, Bison King, Lion Ha-Oh, Shurikenger (43)
- Doubutsu Sentai Zyuohger (2016-2017) - Azurdo
- Uchu Sentai Kyuranger (2017-2018) - Oushi Black/Champ

=== Kamen Rider series ===
- Kamen Rider Black (1987-1988) - Kamen Rider Black
- Kamen Rider Black RX (1988-1989) - Kamen Rider Black RX
- Shin Kamen Rider: Prologue (1992) - Kamen Rider Shin
- Kamen Rider ZO (1993) - Kamen Rider ZO
- Kamen Rider J (1994) - Kamen Rider J
- Kamen Rider World (1994) - Kamen Rider ZO, Kamen Rider J
- Kamen Rider Agito (2001-2002) - Kamen Rider G3 Mild
- Kamen Rider Agito: Project G4 (2001) - Kamen Rider G4
- Kamen Rider Ryuki (2002-2003) - Kamen Rider Ouja, Kamen Rider Odin
- Kamen Rider Ryuki: Episode Final (2002) - Kamen Rider Ouja, Kamen Rider Ryuga
- Kamen Rider 555 (2003-2004) - Crocodile Orphnoch, Rose Orphnoch
- Kamen Rider Blade (2004-2005) - Kamen Rider Leangle
- Kamen Rider Blade: Missing Ace (2004) - Kamen Rider Leangle
- Kamen Rider Kabuto (2006-2007) - Worm
- Kamen Rider Kabuto: God Speed Love (2006) - Kamen Rider Caucasus
- Kamen Rider Den-O (2007-2008) - Kintaros/Kamen Rider Den-O Ax Form
- Kamen Rider Den-O: I'm Born! (2007) - Kintaros/Kamen Rider Den-O Ax Form
- Kamen Rider Kiva (2008-2009) - Kamen Rider Ixa
- Kamen Rider Den-O & Kiva: Climax Deka (2008) - Kintaros, Kamen Rider Nega Den-O/Negataros
- Kamen Rider Kiva: King of the Castle in the Demon World (2008) - Kamen Rider Ixa
- Saraba Kamen Rider Den-O: Final Countdown (2008) - Kintaros/Kamen Rider Den-O Ax Form
- Kamen Rider Decade (2009) - Kamen Rider Black, Kamen Rider Black RX, Kamen Rider Delta, Kintaros/Kamen Rider Den-O Ax Form, Kamen Rider Drake, Kamen Rider Leangle, Kamen Rider Odin, Kamen Rider Ouja, Kamen Rider Ryuga, Shinken Gold (Episode 24, 25)
- Cho Kamen Rider Den-O & Decade Neo Generations: The Onigashima Warship (2009) - Kintaros, Goludora, Kamen Rider Caucasus
- Kamen Rider Decade: All Riders vs. Dai-Shocker (2009) - Kamen Rider Black, Kamen Rider Black RX, Kamen Rider Shin, Kamen Rider ZO, Kamen Rider J, Kamen Rider Ouja, Kamen Rider Ixa, Shadow Moon, Ikadevil, Garagaranda
- Kamen Rider × Kamen Rider W & Decade: Movie War 2010 (2009) - Kamen Rider J, Masquerade Dopant
- Kamen Rider × Kamen Rider × Kamen Rider The Movie: Cho-Den-O Trilogy (2010) - Kintaros, Kamen Rider Caucasus, Piggies Imagin
- OOO, Den-O, All Riders: Let's Go Kamen Riders (2011) - Kintaros, Kamen Rider Black RX, Shadow Moon
- Kamen Rider × Kamen Rider Fourze & OOO: Movie War Mega Max (2011) - Super Gingaoh
- Kamen Rider × Super Sentai: Super Hero Taisen (2012) - Kamen Rider Black RX, Kintaros/Kamen Rider Den-O Ax Form, Akudos Gill
- Heisei Riders vs. Shōwa Riders: Kamen Rider Taisen feat. Super Sentai (2014) - General Schwarz
- Kamen Rider Drive (2014-2015) - Heart Roidmude
- Kamen Rider Zi-O (2018-2019) - Another Decade
- Kamen Rider Saber (2020-2021) - Kamen Rider Buster
- Kamen Rider Gavv (2024-2025) - Dente Stomach

=== Metal Hero series ===
- Choujinki Metalder (1987) Seiko Seno Stunt Double, Phantom
- Tokkyuu Shirei Solbrain (1991-1992) Knight Fire
- Tokusou Robo Janperson (1993-1994) Bill Goldy
- Juukou B-Fighter (1995-1996) Black Beet, Blue Beet
- B-Fighter Kabuto (1996-1997) Descorpion, B-Fighter Min

=== Normal Roles ===
- Kamen Rider Black (1988) A man manipulated by Bilgenia
- Tokusou Exceedraft (1992) Jewel thief
- Tokusou Robo Janperson (1993) Zhen Combat-Da Guang
- Blue SWAT (1994) - resistance, Wadi, Gilgavision commands
- Juukou B-Fighter (1995) Hammer kong (voice), Combat-Mecha Gamerio (Human Form)
- B-Robo Kabutack (1997) Fighting Robot
- Kamen Rider Kuuga (2002) Sniper
- Kamen Rider Ryuki (2000) Black-suited man, Coast Guard officer
- Kamen Rider 555 (2004) Riotrooper member
- Tokusou Sentai Dekaranger (2004) Policeman, Alienizer
- Kamen Rider Den-O (2007) Dojo Owner
- Kamen Rider × Kamen Rider W & Decade: Movie War 2010 (2010) Gaia Memory Distributor
- Zyuden Sentai Kyoryuger (2014) - Civilian
- Reach Beyond the Blue Sky (2021) - Kijūrō
