= Eat Salmon on Christmas! =

Japanese internet meme

Eat Salmon on Christmas! (Japanese: クリスマスには鮭を食え, Hepburn: Kurisumasu niwa shake wo kue) is an internet meme originating from a quote made by an antagonist character in an episode of Kaitou Sentai Lupinranger VS Keisatsu Sentai Patranger, a Super Sentai series in 2018. This quote was originally spoken by a salmon villain named Salmorn Shakexanthin on the 45th episode, who replaced chickens with salmon on Christmas, disrupting the sales of chicken while promoting salmon fillets as a food for Christmas. The meme has been used by the Ministry of Agriculture, Forestry and Fisheries from 2021 to promote the consumption of salmon in the said period.

== Origin ==
The quote comes from the 45th episode of the Super Sentai series title Kaitou Sentai Lupinranger VS Keisatsu Sentai Patranger. The episode, titled "Looking Forward to Christmas", featured Salmorn Shakexanthin replacing chicken with salmon fillets and encouraging people to eat them instead for Christmas. During the battle scene, recipes for salmon chahan and hizunamasu are shown.

Eating chicken on Christmas is a tradition unique to Japan, which is said to be influenced by KFC promoting fried chickens in the country since 1974.

== Spread ==
The phrase, along with the hashtag of the quote spread on Twitter after the airing of the episode. The Ministry of Agriculture, Forestry and Fisheries began promoting the consumption of salmon on the same platform since 2021. This is a part of the ministry's attempt to increase the declining consumption rate of fisheries. Since the spread of the quote, the episode has been uploaded to YouTube by the Toei Tokusatsu channel during the Christmas season several times.

== See also ==
- Kaitou Sentai Lupinranger VS Keisatsu Sentai Patranger
- Super Sentai
- KFC#Japan
- Internet meme
