= Shin Kamen Rider =

Shin Kamen Rider (新仮面ライダー, lit. "New Masked Rider") may refer to:

- Shin Kamen Rider: Prologue, a 1992 film
- Shin Kamen Rider (film), a 2023 film
- Kamen Rider (Skyrider), also referred to as Kamen Rider (Shin)
- Shin Kamen Rider, a manga adaptation of Kamen Rider (1971)
