= Super Sentai World =

- All 25 Sentai Heroes gathered from five different teams. From closest to furthest: Zyuranger, Dairanger, Kakuranger, Jetman, and Fiveman.

Japanese name
- Kanji: スーパー戦隊 ワールド
Transcriptions
- Revised Hepburn: Sūpā Sentai Wārudo
- Directed by: Katsuya Watanabe
- Written by: Kyōko Sagiyama
- Starring: Teruaki Ogawa; Satomi Hirose; Hiroshi Tsuchida; Shū Kawai; Kane Kosugi
- Music by: Eiji Kawamura
- Production company: Toei Company
- Release date: August 6, 1994
- Running time: 9 minutes
- Country: Japan
- Language: Japanese

Super Sentai World (スーパー戦隊 ワールド, Sūpā Sentai Wārudo) is a short 3-D superhero film based on the Super Sentai franchise that was shown in 1994 in amusement parks and special events nationwide in Japan. It was shown as a triple feature alongside Kamen Rider World and Toei Hero Daishugō (a crossover of Tokusou Robo Janperson and Blue Swat, which also used footage from this short).

== Summary ==
The film involves the team-up of five different Super Sentai teams (Ninja Sentai Kakuranger, Gosei Sentai Dairanger, Kyōryū Sentai Zyuranger, Chōjin Sentai Jetman, and Chikyū Sentai Fiveman), who must defend the planet Earth from the evil demon Emperor Daidas. In addition to the five Sentai teams, the film also features Shiro Izumi, who played Yūma Ōzora in Dengeki Sentai Changeman and Burai in Zyuranger, as Masato, a young man who is taken captive Emperor Daidas' forces alongside his sister Ayumi. Masato and Ayumi also appear in Kamen Rider World, linking the two movies.

The narration was provided by Hironori Miyata, the narrator from Dairanger.

== Characters ==
=== Heroes ===
The film features 15 heroes from the aforementioned Sentai teams. None of them appear out of costume and only some of them are voiced by their original actors (namely all five members of Kakuranger, RyuuRanger and TenmaRanger from Dairanger, and TyrannoRanger from Zyuranger). Only the initial members of each team appear in the film (thus DragonRanger from Zyuranger and KibaRanger from Dairanger are absent as a result).

The main giant robots of each team also appear in this film: Five Robo from Fiveman, Jet Icarus from Jetman, Daizyuzin from Zyuranger, Dairen-oh from Dairanger, and Muteki Shogun from Kakuranger.

=== Villains ===
- Daidas the Emperor (帝王ダイダス, Teiō Daidasu): A giant extraterrestrial being that plots to conquer the Earth by defeating the five Sentai teams. He is powerful enough to fight against five giant robots at the same time. His only weak point is his third eye.
- Zaigan (ザイガン): The leader of the monster army who serves Daidas. His armor resembles the one worn by Zimba, a villain from Kōsoku Sentai Turboranger.
- Bango (バンゴ): Zaigan's ally.
- Damaru (ダマル): Another ally of Zaigan. His mask was originally worn by Fujimibōma, a Bōma Monster from Kōsoku Sentai Turboranger.
- Soger (ゾガー, Sogā): A monster who arrives late to the battle holding the two civilians hostage. Wields a gun. His name is unmentioned in the film.
- Irubaru (イルバル): A monster who arrives at the same time with Soger. His name is also unmentioned in the film.
- Foot Soldiers: Revived foot soldiers from previous enemy organizations fought by the five Sentai teams. Includes the Batzler Soldiers from Fiveman, the Grinam Soldiers from Jetman, the Golem Soldiers from Zyuranger, the Cotpotros from Dairanger, and the Dorodoros from Kakuranger.

== Cast ==
- Shiro Izumi – Masato, Five Red (voice)

=== Voice actors ===
- Teruaki Ogawa – Ninja Red
- Satomi Hirose – Ninja White, Five Yellow
- Hiroshi Tsuchida – Ninja Blue
- Shū Kawai – Ninja Yellow
- Kane Kosugi – Ninja Black
- Keiichi Wada – RyuuRanger
- Ei Homura – TenmaRanger, ShishiRanger
- Yūta Mochizuki – TyrannoRanger, Black Condor
- Jūrōta Kosugi – Saigan, Red Hawk
- Dai Matsumoto – Emperor Daidas

== Staff ==
- Music: Eiji Kawamura
- Screenplay: Kyōko Sagiyama
- Direction: Katsuya Watanabe

== Media ==
The film was featured in the DVD release Super Sentai: The Movie Vol. 4. It did not retain the 3D effects from the original theatrical release. It was also included on a bonus disc in the Super Sentai: The Movie Blu-ray box set with Toei Hero Daishugō, this time retaining the 3D effects.

== See also ==
- Power/Rangers, a similar fan film by Adi Shankar
- Power Rangers
