= The Masked Rider: Kamen Rider ZO =

1994 video game

- North American cover art featuring the titular protagonist.
- Developer: Telenet Japan
- Publishers: JP: Toei Video; NA: Sega of America
- Director: Keita Amemiya
- Producers: Eric Quakenbush; Hori Nagafumi; Satoshi Kubo
- Artist: Takahashi Akihiko
- Writers: Merle Kessler; Noboru Sugimura; Shotaro Ishinomori
- Composer: Kawamura Eiji
- Platform: Sega CD
- Release: JP: May 13, 1994; NA: November 1994
- Genre: Interactive movie
- Mode: Single-player

The Masked Rider: Kamen Rider ZO (Note: Also known as Kamen Rider ZO (Japanese: 仮面ライダーZO, Hepburn: Kamen Raidā ZO) in Japan.) is a video game developed by Telenet Japan and published by Toei Video in Japan and Sega in North America for the Sega CD.

== Gameplay ==
The Masked Rider: Kamen Rider ZO uses video footage ported from the film Kamen Rider ZO. It is an interactive film game.

== Development and release ==
The Masked Rider: Kamen Rider ZO was developed by Telenet Japan (also known as Wolf Team). It is an adaptation of the 1993 movie of the same name, which itself was the 13th iteration of the long-running Kamen Rider media franchise from Toei Company. The Masked Rider contains extra footage that was either cut from the original 48-minute feature or shot specifically for the adaptation. The game was released in Japan by Toei on May 13, 1994. A North American version featuring English-dubbed voice acting and translated text was published by Sega around November 1994, as part of the Sega CD TruVideo line of interactive film games.

== Reception ==
Reception

Review scores
Publication	Score
AllGame	3/5
Beep! MegaDrive	29 / 40
Famitsu	24 / 40
GamePro	3.375 / 5
Next Generation	2/5
VideoGames & Computer Entertainment	4 / 10
Electronic Games	D−
Gamers	4/5
Joypad	73%
Sega Pro	52%
VideoGame	7.3 / 10

Review scores for The Masked Rider were mixed. Critics disagreed on the overall quality of the game due to its reliance on full-motion video and its limited playability as an interactive movie. Many writers compared it to the Sega CD version of Mighty Morphin Power Rangers, another interactive movie based on a tokusatsu franchise (Super Sentai). Chris Bieniek of the magazine VideoGames was complimentary of the monster footage and of Sega of America's willingness to release a localized version of the Kamen Rider adaptation for the franchise's North America fanbase. However, he stated that like Mighty Morphin Power Rangers, The Masked Rider was not as much fun to play as it was to watch. The Brazilian magazines VideoGame and Gamers were both highly complimentary of its visuals and sound though the latter publication subtracted praise for the game's lack of challenge. Likewise, GamePro, Sega Pro, and AllGame all commended its presentation as an FMV game but felt it lacked replay value due to its cinematic structure.

Laurie Yates of Electronic Games conversely criticized its FMV sequences as "visually tired and fuzzy" but similarly concluded that this aspect was "sloppy and haphazard for a piece of software that is more movie than game." Next Generation proclaimed, "It's guy-in-rubber suit action at the "Ultraman" level which has a certain appeal to some folks I know. But as a game, it's almost worthless." The French magazine Joypad found the costumes cheesy, the special effects tasteless, and its stupidity proportional to its fun factor. The reviewer assumed the game would be a hit in Japan and that it would never be released in Europe.
