= Kamen Rider World =

- Kamen Rider ZO (left) and Kamen Rider J (right)

Japanese name
- Kanji: 仮面ライダーワールド
Transcriptions
- Revised Hepburn: Kamen Raidā Wārudo
- Directed by: Katsuya Watanabe
- Written by: Toshihiko Azuma
- Starring: Yūta Mochizuki, Kō Domon, Masaki Terasoma
- Music by: Eiji Kawamura
- Production company: Toei Company
- Release date: August 6, 1994
- Running time: 10 minutes
- Country: Japan
- Language: Japanese

Kamen Rider World (仮面ライダーワールド, Kamen Raidā Wārudo) is a short tokusatsu superhero 3-D film produced by Toei Company based on the Kamen Rider Series that premiered on August 6, 1994 and was shown in amusement parks and special events nationwide in Japan. It was shown as a triple feature alongside Super Sentai World and Toei Hero Daishugō (a crossover between Tokusou Robo Janperson and Blue Swat which also used footage from Super Sentai World).

The film is included as a bonus feature in the Region 2 DVD release of Kamen Rider J by Bandai Visual and Toei Video. The DVD version lacks the 3D effects from the theatrical release. A Blu-ray 3D release is featured in a bonus disc included in the Kamen Rider: The Movie 1972-1988 Blu-ray Box set, released on May 11, 2011, which retained the 3D effects from the theatrical version.

Media Blasters licensed the short along with Kamen Rider ZO, Kamen Rider J and Shin Kamen Rider: Prologue. It will be released in North America in the summer of 2024.

== Summary ==
The movie involves a team-up between the title characters from Kamen Rider ZO and J, who must fight a gang of five revived monsters from previous Kamen Rider works led by Shadow Moon, the antagonist of Kamen Rider Black and Black RX. The monsters include: Sai Mutant, from Kamen Rider Black; Cyborg Soldier Lv. 2, from Shin Kamen Rider: Prologue; and Agito, Garai, and Zu, from Kamen Rider J. Shiro Izumi (Yuma Ozora from Dengeki Sentai Changeman and Burai from Kyōryū Sentai Zyuranger) plays Masato, a young man who gets attacked by the mutant army along with his sister Ayumi. Both, Masato and Ayumi, appear in Super Sentai World as well, linking the two movies. Berry, the talking grasshopper from Kamen Rider J is also in this movie. Kamen Rider J, ZO, Berry, and Shadow Moon were all voiced by their original actors, although ZO and J are not shown out of costume. Footage from the previous 3D Kamen Rider short, Kamen Rider: Sekai ni Kakeru ("Run Across the World") is used for a flashback.

== Plot ==
Shadow Moon returns to life and revives five mutants previously defeated by the Kamen Riders to serve as his personal army. He plots to defeat the Kamen Riders with his army in order to conquer the world. Berry witnesses Shadow Moon's plot and is attacked by the mutants. Masato and his sister Ayumi stumble onto an injured Berry by chance and are chased by the revived mutant army as a result.

However, they are saved by the sudden arrival of Kamen Rider ZO on his ZO Bringer motorcycle, who thwarts off the monsters into a nearby abandoned warehouse. ZO is suddenly assisted by Kamen Rider J, who arrives into the warehouse on his J Crosser bike. The five mutants are defeated by the combined forces of the new Double Riders. The two are then challenged by Shadow Moon, who enlarges himself into giant proportions. J grows into giant size as well and fights off Shadow Moon by himself. Shadow Moon is defeated and peace returns to the day.

== Cast ==
- Kamen Rider ZO (仮面ライダーZO, Kamen Raidā Zetto Ō, Voice): Kou Domon (土門 廣, Domon Kō)
- Kamen Rider J (仮面ライダーJ, Kamen Raidā Jei, Voice): Yūta Mochizuki (望月 祐多, Mochizuki Yūta)
- Berry (ベリー, Berī, Voice): Rikako Aikawa (愛河 里花子, Aikawa Rikako)
- Yuki (勇樹, Yūki): Shiro Izumi (和泉 史郎, Izumi Shirō)
- Shadow Moon (シャドームーン, Shadō Mūn, Voice): Masaki Terasoma (てらそま まさき, Terasoma Masaki)
- Garai (ガライ, Voice): Jūrōta Kosugi (小杉 十郎太, Kosugi Jūrōta)

== Staff ==
- Music: Eiji Kawamura
- Screenplay: Toshihiko Azuma
- Direction: Katsuya Watanabe
