= Yuka Nomura =

Japanese actress (born 1984)

Yuka Nomura (野村 佑香; Nomura Yūka, born March 20, 1984) is a Japanese actress. She was born in Yokohama.

== Filmography ==
- Kamen Rider J (仮面ライダーJ, Kamen Raidaa J) (1994)
- 新生 トイレの花子さん (Shinsei toire no hanako-san) (1998)
- High School Girl's Friend (女学生の友, Jogakusei no Tomo) (2001)
- Kan-Kin (2001)
