= Shiro Izumi =

Japanese actor (born 1961)

- 和泉 史郎
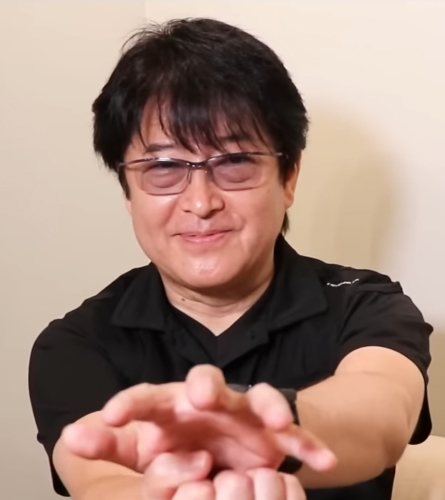
- Izumi in 2022
- Born: May 6, 1961 (age 64)
- Occupation: Actor

Shiro Izumi (和泉 史郎, Izumi Shirō, born May 6, 1961) is a former Japanese actor, well known for his roles in the Super Sentai franchise. He played two different central characters there: Yuuma Oozora/Change Pegasus in Dengeki Sentai Changeman and the role for which he gained the most attention, Burai/Dragon Ranger in Kyōryū Sentai Zyuranger. His tenure as Burai was so popular and successful that when his character died in Zyuranger, a letter writing campaign was undertaken by fans of the series to have him brought back. While the writers ultimately decided to have Burai remain dead as a way of showing the younger viewers that even heroes die at times, Izumi returned to the role briefly as Burai's ghost toward the end of the series. He guest starred in Ninja Sentai Kakuranger and Chōriki Sentai Ohranger and appeared in the short Super Sentai World (as a photographer). He has retired from acting and has one son.

== Filmography ==
- Dengeki Sentai Changeman (1985-1986) - Yûma Ôzora / Change Pegasus
- Kyōryū Sentai Zyuranger (1992) - Burai / DragonRanger
- Super Sentai World (1994) - Masato
- Chouriki Sentai Ohranger (1995) - Kenichi's Father
