= Kamen Rider ZO =

1993 film by Keita Amemiya

- DVD release cover

Japanese name
- Kanji: 仮面ライダーZO
Transcriptions
- Revised Hepburn: Kamen Raidā Zetto Ō
- Directed by: Keita Amemiya
- Screenplay by: Noboru Sugimura
- Based on: Kamen Rider by Shotaro Ishinomori
- Produced by: Yoshinori Watanabe; Makoto Yamashina; Ryonori Watanabe; Shigeru Watanabe; Satoshi Kubo; Nagadumi Hori; Tomoo Kakuta
- Starring: Kou Domon; Shohei Shibata; Isao Sasaki
- Cinematography: Fumio Matsumura
- Edited by: Junkichi Kanno
- Music by: Eiji Kawamura
- Production companies: Toei Company; Bandai Visual; Ishimori Production
- Distributed by: Toei Company
- Release date: April 17, 1993
- Running time: 48 minutes
- Country: Japan
- Language: Japanese
- Budget: ¥300 million ($2.8 million)

Kamen Rider ZO (仮面ライダーZO, Kamen Raidā Zetto Ō), translated Masked Rider ZO, is a 1993 Japanese tokusatsu superhero film directed by Keita Amemiya, and co-produced between Toei Company and Bandai. A Sega CD interactive movie, The Masked Rider: Kamen Rider ZO, was released in 1994.

To commemorate the series' 40th anniversary, ZO was shown on Toei's pay-per-view channel in September 2011. The film's protagonist, Kamen Rider ZO, appears in the later Kamen Rider Decade television series and is a playable character in the 2011 Nintendo DS video game All Kamen Rider: Rider Generation. Media Blasters licensed Kamen Rider ZO for a Region 1 Blu-ray release, along with Shin: Kamen Rider Prologue, Kamen Rider J, and the short Kamen Rider World. A limited Collector’s Edition featuring World and a special interview with Director Keita Amemiya was released in the summer of 2024 exclusively on the Media Blasters website, while a Standard Edition of the Blu-ray for the wider market was released in April of 2025. This version of the Blu-ray however does not contain neither the short nor the interview.

== Plot ==
Masaru Aso is the laboratory assistant of geneticist Doctor Mochizuki. He is used in one of Mochizuki's experiments related to the creation of the Neo-Lifeform, enabling him to transform into the grasshopper-like Kamen Rider ZO. He flees to the mountains and lapses into a two-year coma before he is awakened by a telepathic call to protect Hiroshi Mochizuki, the doctor's son. After an attempt to discover the meaning of his transformation at Mochizuki Genetics, Masaru senses that Hiroshi is in danger and saves the boy from Doras as ZO.

Doras regenerates from the battle, creating two creatures to hunt down Hiroshi. Meanwhile, fearing for his life, Hiroshi runs to his eccentric inventor grandfather, Seikichi who dismisses his monster story at first. Seeing Masaru outside Seikichi's house, Hiroshi panics and runs away, crossing paths with Reiko and her karate class at their dojo. Masaru reveals himself to the group as Hiroshi's bodyguard before a freak bat suddenly terrorizes them. Knocked out of the air by one of the karate students, transforming into a humanoid bat monster, "Bat-Man". Transforming into ZO, Masaru battles Bat-Man to cover Hiroshi and Reiko's escape, but they are sucked into a pocket dimension by the other Doras creation, "Spider-Woman". ZO saves them and kills Spider-Woman; with ZO having to fend off Bat-Man once more who tries to kidnap Hiroshi but is thwarted.

After he saves Hiroshi, Masaru tells Seikichi that Hiroshi's father used him in his experiments. Refusing to believe it, Hiroshi runs off. Masaru finds him and fixes his watch, recognizing the melody which awakened him as he helps Hiroshi cope with the revelation. However, as Hiroshi comes to terms, he suddenly spots his father alive and well in the crowded city. Cornering him, Hiroshi's father reveals himself to be the Bat-Man in disguise. Running after him, Masaru comes face to face with a full-power Doras who knocks Masaru unconscious with a projectile fist, sending him hurtling down from a building and crashing down onto a car. Masaru awakens when a grasshopper shows him where Hiroshi has been taken. Making his way to a complex, ZO faces Bat-Man once more and kills him. He finds Hiroshi and Dr. Mochizuki, learning that the geneticist was the one who woke him up and that the Neo-Lifeform has been acting independently to become a perfect being. The Neo-Lifeform materializes from a strange pool and takes on Hiroshi's voice to reveal its plan, wanting to use the professor's son to make him complete his work. The Neo-Lifeform then transforms into Doras to fight ZO once more, absorbing him into his body to become "Red Doras".

At a crucial moment, the music from Hiroshi's keepsake watch keeps Doras at bay, startling him just long enough for Professor Mochizuki to sacrifice his life to damage the Neo-Lifeform's pool and allow ZO to escape the forced fusion. With a final Rider Kick, ZO defeats Doras and destroys the Neo-Lifeform. Just then the complex begins to self-destruct. ZO takes the grieving Hiroshi and the two of them make a desperate escape from the flames. Leaving the boy with Seikichi, Masaru leaves for parts unknown.

== Characters ==
- Masaru Aso (麻生 勝, Asō Masaru): is a main protagonist of Story, Masaru was Doctor Mochizuki's assistant until Mochizuki experiments on him, turning Masaru into the grasshopper-themed cyborg Kamen Rider ZO. Although he hates Mochizuki, Masaru eventually forgives him.
- Hiroshi Mochizuki (望月 宏, Mochizuki Hiroshi): A young boy who lives with his grandfather, Seikichi, and is targeted by the Neonoid. Hiroshi longs to be with his father, who went missing years ago. As a memento, Doctor Mochizuki gave Hiroshi a pocket watch which plays music. Hiroshi is afraid of ZO at first, but eventually calls him "Brother".
- Doctor Mochizuki (望月 博士, Mochizuki-hakase): A mad scientist who turns Masaru into ZO and creates the Neo-Lifeform. Although he dreams of creating a "perfect lifeform", it turns on him. Mochizuki uses grasshoppers to telepathically contact ZO.
- Neonoid (ネオ生命体, Neo Seimeitai): A pool of living fluid which relies on its container for survival. It assumes the appearance of a deformed, egotistical, unemotional boy resembling Hiroshi. It becomes the grotesque, Kamen Rider-like Doras (ドラス, Dorasu) to find Hiroshi and force Dr. Mochizuki to complete its evolution into a perfect life form and destroy the human race and its imperfections. Doras can regenerate after injury, absorbing materials to upgrade itself. When Doras absorbs ZO, it becomes Doras Strengthened Form (ドラス強化体, Dorasu Kyōkatai).
- Spider Woman (クモ女, Kumo Onna): A monster created by Doras, she is a four-legged spider who captures Hiroshi.
- Bat Man (コウモリ男, Kōmori Otoko): Another monster created by Doras, he is a black bat-like entity which can disguise itself as a human. As Mochizuki, it lures Hiroshi to its master's hideout.

== Cast ==
- Masaru Aso (麻生 勝, Asō Masaru): Kou Domon (土門 廣, Domon Kō)
- Hiroshi Mochizuki (望月 宏, Mochizuki Hiroshi): Shohei Shibata (柴田 翔平, Shibata Shōhei)
- Doctor Mochizuki (望月博士, Mochizuki-Hakase): Isao Sasaki (佐々木 功, Sasaki Isao)
- Seikichi Mochizuki (望月 清吉, Mochizuki Seikichi): Hiroshi Inuzuka (犬塚 弘, Inuzuka Hiroshi)
- Reiko (玲子, Reiko): Naomi Morinaga (森永 奈緒美, Morinaga Naomi)
- Kuroda (黒田, Kuroda): Kenji Ohba (大葉 健二, Ōba Kenji)
- Nishimura (西村, Nishimura): Masaru Yamashita (山下 優, Yamashita Masaru)
- Miyazaki (宮崎, Miyazaki): Iori Sakakibara (榊原 伊織, Sakakibara Iori)
- Neonoid/Doras (ネオ生命体／ドラス, Neo Seimeitai/Dorasu; Voice): Shingo Yuzawa (湯沢 真伍, Yuzawa Shingo)

== Production ==
The idea for the project was conceived due to the strong sales of Shin Kamen Rider: Prologue, which was released through direct-to-video. Many proposals were planned such as sequel to Shin, or a feature film featuring Ichigo to Black RX. However, it was decided that it would be a standalone film.

Shigeru Okada, then president of Toei Video, Ryonori Watanabe, and Makoto Yamashina, then president of Bandai Visual, proposed a joint project on the condition that it would push box office sales through a multi-million yen campaign. Okada was one of the first to green-light the film. He then collaborated with Yamashina and planned to release the upcoming film by next May. Bandai would refresh their brands to focus on making mass sales while Toei collaborated to develop Kamen Rider World as part of the promotions.

There were restrictions on producing ZO from within the company, but Okada pulled through and decided to produce the film over a year before its eventual release. In March 1992, the decision to produce the film had begun and an multichannel marketing was deployed for potential box-office sales, such as film, television events, and merchandise sales.

It was planned as a standalone release theatrically because it was an anniversary film. However, due to potential box-office risks, executives created the Toei Super Hero Fair and was shown alongside the theatrical versions of Gosei Sentai Dairanger and Tokusou Robo Janperson. For that reason, ZO's runtime was shortened at 48 minutes than the envisioned 90, causing the film's development to be rushed. It was director Keita Amemiya's idea to shortened the length of the film as if it were a Makunouchi bento.

Production of the film had begun on November 19, 1992. The film had finished principal photography on December 20, 1992, and was officially completed on February 3, 1993.

== Songs ==
"Hohoemi no Yukue" (微笑みの行方; "The Whereabouts of Smile") and "Ai ga Tomaranai" (愛が止まらない; "Love Doesn't Stop"), composed by Eiji Kawamura with lyrics by Akira Ōtsu, were sung by the Japanese group infix.

== ZO vs. J ==
The S.I.C. Hero Saga story, published in Monthly Hobby Japan magazine from February to May 2005, contained a crossover with Kamen Rider J entitled Masked Rider ZO (& J): ZO vs. J (MASKED RIDER ZO (& J）-ZO vs J-, Kamen Raidā Zetto Ō (ando Jei) -Zetto Ō vs Jei-). In the story, the Neo Organism Doras obtains the Fog Mother's powers. It introduces the characters Red Doras Ver. 2 (赤ドラスver.2, Aka Dorasu ver.2), Doras Ultimate Form (ドラス究極形態, Dorasu Kyūkyokukeitai) and Fog Doras (フォッグ・ドラス, Foggu Dorasu).

== Adaptations ==
Kazuhiko Shimamoto drew a manga adaptation of the film. It takes some liberties with the plot, expanding the role of several characters, a different characterization of ZO and more-graphic violence. The manga includes short stories about Kamen Rider Black and Kamen Rider creator Shotaro Ishinomori.

The film was adapted into the video game The Masked Rider: Kamen Rider ZO and released in North America for the Sega CD, despite the film's never airing there. It also features extra footage of scenes not used on the final version of the original film.

Saban Entertainment spliced together footage from Kamen Rider ZO for its Masked Rider TV show, with the monsters used in some episodes. Doras became Destructosphere, and was the first monster sent by series villain Count Dregon in the opening two-part episode "Escape From Edenoi". Spider Woman became Arachnida, appearing in the episode "Stranger from The North" and with a monster from the sequel Kamen Rider J. Bat Man became Parasect and appeared in the episode, "Cat-Atomic".
