= Kamen Rider J =

- DVD release cover
- Directed by: Keita Amemiya
- Screenplay by: Shozo Uehara
- Based on: Kamen Rider by Shotaro Ishinomori
- Starring: Yūta Mochizuki; Yuka Nomura; Kyoji Kamui
- Music by: Eiji Kawamura
- Production companies: Toei Company; Toei Video; Bandai
- Distributed by: Toei Company
- Release date: April 16, 1994
- Running time: 47 minutes
- Language: Japanese

Kamen Rider J (仮面ライダーJ, Kamen Raidā Jei) is a 1994 Japanese tokusatsu superhero film directed by Keita Amemiya. A co-production between Toei Company, Toei Video and Bandai, it was the final story in which Shotaro Ishinomori, who died four years later, was involved. The film was released on April 16, 1994.

== Plot ==
After conducting a praying ceremony, the three oldest children of the alien Fog Mother hunt for an ideal human to feed to their newly hatched siblings. They find Kana, the young friend of environmentalist reporter Kouji Segawa, when he is investigating pollution at the lake. Protecting Kana from the villains as they escape, Kouji is thrown over a cliff by the reptilian Agito and dies; Kana is taken by the insectoid, Zu.

The Earth Spirits resurrect Kouji as Kamen Rider J to fight the Fog Mother with the Earth Spirits' emissary, Berry, as his guide. With Fog Mother sensing Kouji's presence, Agito tries to finish the job and is killed by J. Kouji enters the Fog Mother's domain, facing Zu in her proper form. J kills Zu as they crash into the fortress which is Fog Mother. After Zu dies, Kouji learns about Fog's intention to let her new brood devour humanity as Garai completes the ritual, sends Kana to the hatching chamber, and manhandles Kouji.

Berry intervenes to free Kana from Fog's spell before he is struck down by Garai; Kana is sent down to her death, and Fog Mother begins attacking a nearby city to prepare for her children's awakening. J fights Garai in a heated battle in his true form (Cobra Man). After he kills Garai, J is digested by Fog Mother as he tries to save Kana. Absorbing the life energy around him, J kills Fog Mother's newborn offspring, escapes from her bowels, and assumes the Jumbo Formation. After ripping Kana out of Fog Mother, J kills the monster. Escaping Fog Mother's destruction, Kouji brings Kana to a peaceful place as Berry watches from a distance.

== Characters ==
- Koji Segawa (瀬川 耕司, Segawa Kōji): An environmentalist reporter who is killed by the Fog Mother's child, Agito, when they take Kana. He is revived as Kamen Rider J by the Earth Spirits to defend the planet from the Fog Mother and her children. With his J-Spirit (Jスピリット, Jei Supiritto) transformation belt, J can perform the J-Kick (Jキック, Jei Kikku). His greatest ability is to assume the Jumbo Formation (ジャンボフォーメーション, Janbo Fōmēshon) by gathering the life force from surrounding life forms, growing to 40 metres (131 ft) tall to fight larger opponents. In this state, J can perform the Jumbo Rider Kick (ジャンボライダーキック, Janbo Raidā Kikku). He rides a J-Crosser (ジェイクロッサー, Jei Kurossā), a Suzuki road bike (2012 Suzuki DR650SE) which can reach a speed of 1,300 kilometres per hour (810 mph). J can use the J-Crosser to execute the J-Strike (ジェイストライク, Jei Sutoraiku) attack. Early designs by Ishinomori gave Kamen Rider J a pair of wing-like appendages on his back to indicate the origin of the character's powers.
- Kana Kimura (木村 加那, Kimura Kana): Kouji's young friend, who is captured by Fog Mother's children so she can be sacrificed.
- Berry (ベリー, Berī): A large grasshopper who is Kamen Rider J's guide for the Earth Spirits.

=== Fog ===
Fog (フォッグ, Foggu) are a group of monsters whose presence is signaled by mist. Every millennium, the Fog Mother gives birth to a new brood to feed on the occupants of the world on which she landed. One such brood was responsible for the mass extinction of the dinosaurs, which were their sole food supply. Seventy-five million years later, the Fog Mother returns to Earth with a new brood. Her three children say a ritual prayer before going out to obtain a sacrifice for their siblings to feed on so they can consume the human race.

- Machine Beast Mothership Fog Mother (機械獣母艦フォッグ・マザー, Kikaijū Bokan Foggu Mazā): The Fog Mother, an alien parasite in a gold battle fortress who sends her three oldest children to obtain a human sacrifice for their unborn siblings to feed on before devouring the rest of the human race, is responsible for exterminating the dinosaurs. Her machine body can shoot gatling guns, shoot a laser from her right eye, emit circular-saw blades from her left eye, lower pincers to grab and emit insect-like legs from her torso to attack. She can feel pain if her machine is attacked. After Garai is killed, Fog Mother attempts to digest J but he enlarges and kills her newborn offspring. He impales the Fog Mother with his fist to pull out Kana. J frees himself from her clutches, breaking her pincers and insect-like legs and using a Jumbo Rider Kick to damage her body as it begins to self-detonate. In a last effort to destroy Kamen Rider J, she drags him back into her body but he frees himself and kills her with a Rider Punch as her machine body explodes.

- Garai (ガライ, Garai): The oldest of the Fog Mother's children, assuming the form of a young man. He is called "Prince" by the Fog Mother. His true form is Cobra Man (コブラ男, Kobura Otoko), an armored cobra-like monster with a laser saber and a constricting whip who can use a ball which turns into a claw. He conducts the prayer ceremony while his younger siblings battle J and takes on J to keep the sacrifice going until Berry comes to J's aid. With Kana in the egg chamber and Berry knocked out, Garai absorbs the surrounding mist and assumes his true form. Kamen Rider J impales him with a sharp object, and Garai uses his ball attack. Kamen Rider J frees himself from it and uses the Rider Kick to knock Garai unto the altar, fatally injuring him.
- Zu (ズー, Zū): Assuming the form of a young woman, her true form is the Wasp Woman (ハチ女, Hachi Onna): a colorful female bee monster, with wings on her head and the ability to shoot needles from her hands. She kidnapped Kana for the sacrifice. When Agito's death is learned, Zu is sent to avenge her brother. She uses crimson ribbons to trap Kouji and drop him from the sky after she sheds her human form, but he becomes Kamen Rider J and overpowers her. She shoots him in the arm with a needle, grabs him and takes him up in the air. Zu, mortally wounded when she collides with the Fog Mother's ship, sees Garai one last time before she dies and fades into the mist.
- Agito (アギト, Agito): Assuming the form of a middle-aged man, his true form is Lizard Man (トカゲ男, Tokage Otoko): an alligator-like monster with poisonous fangs and a constricting tail. He killed Kouji, and is determined to kill him again when he learns he is still alive. When he encounters Kouji (as Kamen Rider J), he sheds his human form and attacks him. Agito tries to escape by climbing a cliff, but Kamen Rider J kills him with a Rider Punch to his head and he falls to his death.

== Other appearances ==
J joined Kamen Rider ZO in the eight-minute 3D film, Kamen Rider World, and appeared in the 2009 film Kamen Rider Decade: All Riders vs. Dai-Shocker. In the film's climax, he is summoned (in giant form) by Kamen Rider Diend to battle King Dark. With Diend's help, he merges with Kamen Rider Decade to form Kamen Rider Decade Final Form: Jumbo Formation.

J also appeared in the 2010 film Kamen Rider × Kamen Rider W & Decade: Movie War 2010, in which Kamen Rider Decade defeated him and turned him into a card. After Decade's defeat, all the Riders turned into cards are restored to their respective worlds. Kamen Rider J also appears among the Riders in the Kamen Rider Series 40th-anniversary film OOO, Den-O, All Riders: Let's Go Kamen Rider (2011), Kamen Rider × Super Sentai: Super Hero Taisen (2012), Heisei Rider vs. Showa Rider: Kamen Rider Taisen feat. Super Sentai (2014), and Super Hero Taisen GP: Kamen Rider 3 (2015).

== Cast ==
- Koji Segawa (瀬川 耕司, Segawa Kōji): Yūta Mochizuki (望月 祐多, Mochizuki Yūta); Actor Suit: Jiro Okamoto
- Kana Kimura (木村 加那, Kimura Kana): Yuka Nomura (野村 佑香, Nomura Yūka)
- Berry (ベリー, Berī; Voice): Rikako Aikawa (愛河 里花子, Aikawa Rikako)
- Garai (ガライ, Garai): Kyoji Kamui (神威 杏次, Kamui Kyōji)
- Zu (ズー, Zū): Yoko Mari (万里 洋子, Mari Yōko)
- Agito (アギト, Agito): Satoshi Kurihara (栗原 敏, Kurihara Satoshi)
- Fog Mother (フォッグマザー, Foggu Mazā; Voice): Maho Maruyama (丸山 真歩, Maruyama Maho) (Played as Mariho Kayama (佳山 真梨穂, Kayama Mariho))
- Earth Spirit (地空人, Chikūjin): Shuji Uchida (内田 修司, Uchida Shūji)
- Earth Spirit (地空人, Chikūjin): Yurika Nagano (永野 百合香, Nagano Yurika)
- Narrator (ナレーター, Narētā): Shōzō Iizuka (飯塚 昭三, Iizuka Shōzō)

== Songs ==
"Just One Love" and the closing song "Kokoro Tsunagu Ai" (心つなぐ愛; "Hearts Connect Love"), written by Eiji Kawamura with lyrics by Akira Ōtsu, were sung by BYUE.

== Releases ==
• The film was released on April 16, 1994, for the Toei Super Hero Fair.

• As part of the media franchise's 40th anniversary, J was shown on Toei's pay-per-view channel in September 2011.

• Media Blasters licensed Kamen Rider J for a Region 1 Blu-ray release, along with Shin: Kamen Rider Prologue, Kamen Rider ZO, and the short Kamen Rider World. A limited Collector’s Edition featuring World and a special interview with Director Keita Amemiya was released in the summer of 2024 exclusively on the Media Blasters website, while a Standard Edition of the Blu-ray for the wider market was released in April of 2025. This version of the Blu-ray however does not contain neither the short nor the interview.

== Stock footage for Masked Rider ==
Saban Entertainment used monster footage from the film in their Masked Rider TV show. Hachi Woman became Hydrasect, appearing in the episode "Stranger from the North" with a monster from the previous film Kamen Rider ZO. Fog Mother became Ultivore, appearing in the episode "Saturday Morning Invasion", and Tokage Man became Cyborgator and appeared in the episode "Ectophase Albee".

== Legacy ==
- Kamen Rider J appears in the film versions of the Kamen Rider Decade television series (most notably in the climax of All Riders vs. Dai-Shocker, where he enables the heroes to defeat the film's antagonist).
- Kamen Rider J is also a playable character in the 2011 Nintendo DS video game, All Kamen Rider: Rider Generation.
