= Shin Kamen Rider: Prologue =

- DVD cover art

Japanese name
- Kanji: 真・仮面ライダー 序章(プロローグ)
Transcriptions
- Revised Hepburn: Shin Kamen Raidā: Purorōgu
- Directed by: Makoto Tsuji
- Written by: Shotaro Ishinomori; Hayato Miyashita; Jou Onodera
- Based on: Kamen Rider by Shotaro Ishinomori
- Produced by: Satoru Kubo
- Starring: Katsuhisa Ishikawa; Yumi Nomura; Akira Ishihama
- Music by: Ryudo Uzaki
- Production companies: Toei Company, Ltd.; Toei Video Co., Ltd.
- Distributed by: Bandai Visual
- Release date: 20 February 1992
- Running time: 88 minutes
- Country: Japan
- Language: Japanese

Shin Kamen Rider: Prologue (真・仮面ライダー 序章(プロローグ), Shin Kamen Raidā: Purorōgu) is a 1992 Japanese V-Cinema tokusatsu superhero horror film serving a reimagining of the Kamen Rider franchise and commemorates the 20th anniversary of the Kamen Rider Series. Directed by Makoto Tsuji, it is the first standalone film in the series. Toei has marketed the film to English speaking markets as True Masked Rider: Prologue. The film was released in Japan on 20 February 1992.

== Plot ==
Doctors Kazamatsuri and Onizuka are geneticists, researching cures for diseases such as AIDS and cancer by performing experiments to strengthen the human body. The test subject, Shin Kazamatsuri, races motorcycles and is Doctor Kazamatsuri's son, who volunteered to help by being the test subject for the Institute of Super Science (ISS). Unknown to the doctors, their operation is funded by a syndicate group who plans to use the research to have the bodies of men strengthened to create mutant cyborg soldiers (改造兵士, Kaizō Heishi) for their own gain. However, they did not count on Onizuka's own secret ambitions: he wants to create a new species of soldiers by fusing the DNA of a grasshopper and test subjects to start a new civilization and be their God. He may have tested it on himself, but seems to be having greater success with Shin.

Meanwhile, a creature is stalking the city, killing people, as Shin dreams of that creature. While Shin believes he is the one causing the murders, he eventually finds Onizuka's plan and discovers that Onizuka is behind the killings. Onizuka has experimented on himself and altered his genes, making him a humanoid grasshopper. The telepathy of grasshoppers allowed him to communicate with Shin, making Shin a witness to the murders.

The syndicate learns of Onizuka's plans and they institutionalize him. A CIA agent tracks Shin and wants him eliminated, for she doesn't know the true threat Shin could pose. Repulsed, Shin investigates all he can about the experiment.

== Cast ==
- Katsuhisa Ishikawa (Note: Pseudonym of Shin Ishikawa) as Shin Kazamatsuri
- Yumi Nomura as Ai Asuka
- Akira Ishihama as Daimon Kazamatsuri
- Daijiro Harada as Iwao Himuro
- Reiji Andou as Goushima
- Kouki Kataoka as Giichi Onizuka
- Kiyomi Tsukada as Sarah Fukamachi
- Masanobu Takashima as Takuya Yuki

== Production ==
Before the name "Kamen Rider Shin" was decided, Shotaro Ishinomori originally planned for the character to be called "Kamen Rider Gaia" (仮面ライダーガイア, Kamen Raidā Gaia). The design would have been closer to a traditional Kamen Rider appearance, before later designs switched to a "Kamen Rider Style Reform" version (resembling a man in a motorcycle helmet and modified riding jacket), and then the mutated insect-like human that would become Kamen Rider Shin.

== Media ==
• The film's song "Forever" was performed by Noriko Watanabe, with lyrics by Hiroko Kimura, composition by Ryuudou Uzaki, and arrangements by Tooru Yuugawa. The film was released on DVD on 25 April 2008, by Bandai Visual. It was later released on Toei Company's subscription channel, which featured the film during its Kamen Rider 40th anniversary line up in July 2011.

• The OST was released by Nippon Colombia on 6 July 2005 as an Animex Special release with a street price of 1,200 Yen with the tracks composed by Ryudo Uzaki and Kaoru Wada.

• Shin Kamen Rider makes appearances in the films of the later Kamen Rider Decade television series. He is also the primary focus of one of the All Riders vs. Dai-Shocker comedic webisodes. Kamen Rider Shin also appears as a playable character in the 2011 Nintendo DS video game All Kamen Rider: Rider Generation.

• Media Blasters licensed Shin Kamen Rider; Prologue for a Region 1 Blu-ray release, along with Kamen Rider ZO, Kamen Rider J, and the short Kamen Rider World. A limited Collector's Edition featuring World and a special interview with the movie director of ZO and J, Keita Amemiya was released in the summer of 2024 exclusively on the Media Blasters website, while a Standard Edition of the Blu-ray for the wider market was released in April 2025. This version of the Blu-ray however does not contain neither the short nor the interview.

• The movie was released worldwide on 5 April 2020 on the Toei Tokusatsu World YouTube channel along with 69 other shows.

== Other releases ==
In April 2025, a Shin Kamen Rider-themed cologne was released.
