= Dengeki Sentai Changeman =

Television series

- Title Screen
- Genre: Tokusatsu; Superhero fiction Science fiction Fantasy
- Created by: Toei Company
- Developed by: Hirohisa Soda
- Directed by: Minoru Yamada; Takao Nagaishi; Nagafumi Hori
- Starring: Haruki Hamada; Kazuoki Takahashi; Shiro Izumi; Hiroko Nishimoto; Mai Ooishi; Jun Fujimaki; Shohei Yamamoto; Yoshinori Okamoto; Kana Fujieda; Fukumi Kuroda
- Narrated by: Nobuo Tanaka
- Composer: Tatsumi Yano
- Country of origin: Japan
- No. of episodes: 55 (list of episodes)

Production
- Producers: Moriyoshi Katō; Takeyuki Suzuki; Yasuhiro Tomita
- Running time: 19 minutes
- Production companies: TV Asahi; Toei Company; Toei Advertising

Original release
- Network: ANN (TV Asahi)
- Release: February 2, 1985 – February 22, 1986

Related
- Choudenshi Bioman; Choushinsei Flashman

Dengeki Sentai Changeman (電撃戦隊チェンジマン, Dengeki Sentai Chenjiman; Electric Strike Squadron Changeman) is a Japanese television tokusatsu series broadcast by TV Asahi. The series is the ninth installment of Super Sentai. Directed by Minoru Yamada, Takao Nagaishi and Nagafumi Hori, it stars Haruki Hamada, Kazuoki Takahashi, Shiro Izumi, Hiroko Nishimoto, Mai Ooishi, Jun Fujimaki, Shohei Yamamoto, Yoshinori Okamoto, Kana Fujieda and Fukumi Kuroda. It aired from February 2, 1985 to February 22, 1986, replacing Choudenshi Bioman and was replaced by Choushinsei Flashman. The international English title is listed by Toei as simply Changeman.

== Plot ==
After conquering hundreds of planets, the Star Cluster Gozma sets its sights on Earth. To defend it, the Japanese military forms an elite Earth Defense Force. Under Commander Ibuki, the force begins rigorous training.

Meanwhile, as their first act, the Gozma decide to eliminate those who pose the greatest risk of interfering with their invasion: the military. After a brutal day of training, the Earth Defense Force recruits are fed up with Ibuki's cruel ways and leave the training session. Soon afterwards, they are attacked by Gozma troops. Five surviving officers gather together, beaten and exhausted but refusing to retreat from the threat. The Earth trembles, empowering them with the Earth Force, giving them the power of mythological beasts and becoming the Changemen. With the mystical power of the Earth Force and military technology, the Changemen begin their war against Gozma.

== Characters ==
=== Changemen ===
The Changemen transformed. From left to right: Mai Tsubasa, Yuma Ozora, Hiryu Tsurugi, Sho Hayate, and Sayaka Nagisa.

The eponymous Changemen are all former members of the various branches of Japanese military who were hand picked by the Earth Defense Force to combat Gozma. As the Changemen, they derive their powers from a mysterious energy called Earth Force (アースフォース, Āsu Fōsu), which gives its users the power to protect Earth from any threat to it.

- Hiryu Tsurugi (剣 飛竜, Tsurugi Hiryū): Hiryu was previously an officer from Kōchi Prefecture in the Japanese Air Force before becoming the red-colored Change Dragon (チェンジドラゴン, Chenji Doragon). Tsurugi is a passionate leader with a kind heart, often getting so focused on a task that he does not think of the possible danger he puts himself in to complete it. He is a sharpshooter and a skilled motorcycle driver. He was also his high school's best baseball player until an accident forced him to quit the game. As Change Dragon, Hiryu is a master of airborne attacks as well as close-range and long-range attacks, even adding some of his baseball skills into his techniques.
- Sho Hayate (疾風 翔, Hayate Shō): Sho was previously a Japanese Army Ranger from Aomori Prefecture before becoming the black-colored Change Gryphon (チェンジグリフォン, Chenji Gurifon). He's a narcissistic womanizer, often combing his hair before entering battle, though it's an exterior for his kind personality.
- Yuma Ozora (大空 勇馬, Ōzora Yūma): Yuma was previously a Branch Officer in the Japanese Army before becoming the blue-colored Change Pegasus (チェンジペガサス, Chenji Pegasasu). He serves as the group's tech member with the ability to tap into superhuman strength. As the youngest, he tends not to respect authority much and often associates himself with the children that the Changemen help. Yuma also has a dream to open up a tonkatsu shop after getting enough money to start it up.
- Sayaka Nagisa (渚 さやか, Nagisa Sayaka): Sayaka was previously a task force officer in the Japanese Army before becoming the white-colored Change Mermaid (チェンジマーメイド, Chenji Māmeido). She is the team's strategist, and sometimes focuses too much on the etiquette of her fellow Changemen. However, Sayaka has a loving and caring aspect of her seen in animals and her feelings for Hiryu.
- Mai Tsubasa (翼 麻衣／チェンジフェニックス, Tsubasa Mai): Mai was previously a spy for the Japanese Army before becoming the pink-colored Change Phoenix (チェンジフェニックス, Chenji Fenikkusu). Like Hiryu, she is also skilled at motorcycle driving. Though appearing to be a tomboy who is rough around the edges, Mai is a caring figure and good friends with Sayaka despite their differences.

==== Allies ====
- Commander Ibuki (伊吹長官, Ibuki-chōkan): The head of the Blitzkrieg Squadron who seems cruel at first but has a caring side too. He is eventually revealed to be Yui Ibuki of Planet Heath which was destroyed by Gozma.
- Electric Strike Squadron (電撃戦隊, Dengeki Sentai): A group of people from various military organization like the Changemen, who function as the team's support. They help out the Changemen in certain situations.
  - Captain Inokuma: An Electric Strike Squadron mechanic who works on the Auto Changers

=== Aliens ===
The Changemen meet other aliens who end up on Earth because of Gozma:

- Nana (ナナ): A young girl from the planet Rigel with superhuman abilities. She is used in tipping the scales for Gozma for when Rigelian girls reach an age they release a massive energy which would give power to whoever is caught in its path. Though aged by 20 years old thanks to Giluke's scheme to become stronger, Nana gains telepathic abilities along with heighten physical abilities.
- Sakura (さくら): An alien from Planet Merle (メルル星, Meruru-sei)
- Volta (ボルタ, Boruta) An alien from Planet Tora (トーラ星, Tōra-sei), also a Space Beast Warrior.
- Shinpei Mizuhara (水原 新平, Mizuhara Shinpei): A boy who has the blood of Alien Posedonia (ポセドニア人, Posedonia-jin).
- Zoorii and Waraji (ゾーリーとワラジー, Zōrī to Warajī): Gaata's wife and son. Their role in the plot grows towards the end of the series because Waraji is able to play in his ocarina a tune which induces homesickness on space creatures, and is eventually used against Gozma members themselves, causing them (even a reluctant Gaata) to target the boy, who angrily breaks the ocarina and storms off, declaring he has no father. Zoorii, in the meantime, becomes pregnant with her and Gaata's daughter, forcing him to abandon Gozma for good.

=== Great Star League Gozma ===
The Great Star League Gozma (大星団ゴズマ, Daiseidan Gozuma; Star Cluster Gozma) is an interstellar criminal shogunate that devastates planets and uses the survivors as warriors to invade other planets. The group is based on the battleship Gozmard (ゴズマード, Gozumādo).

- Star King Bazeu (星王バズー, Seiō Bazū): Bazeu is the leader of Gozma who only appears to his followers as a giant blue limbless torso, which is an illusion created by his true form: the living planet Gozma Star (ゴズマスター, Gozuma Sutā) who absorbs other worlds throughout its interstellar conquest of the universe. Though he spares some planets, Bazeu uses them as a means to intimidate his minions with their destruction as both a drafting method and to ensure no failure. He manages to approach Earth undetected by hiding himself into the tail of Halley's Comet, but is ultimately destroyed by the Changemen after they ride the Change Robo deep onto his body and destroy its core.
- General Giluke (ギルーク司令, Girūku-shirei): Originally from Planet Girath (ギラス星, Girasu-sei), Girook is the invasion leader and secretly plots on overthrowing Bazeu, his first attempt ending in failure. He uses a sword made for the strongest warrior from his homeworld. After being killed, he comes back in a ghost form called Ghost Giluke (ゴーストギルーク, Gōsuto Girūku; 38-43) after fusing with the body of Space Beast Warrior Zados in the Space Beast Graveyard and then force grows Nana to be endowed with the backlash of her energies to become Super Giluke (スーパーギルーク, Sūpā Girūku) before becoming the Space Beast Warrior Girath (ギラス, Girasu). He is finally defeated by the Changemen.
- Adjutant Booba (副官ブーバ, Fukukan Būba): Booba is a former space pirate who has been conscripted to be one of the lieutenants of Giluke. Wielding the Buldobas Sickle, Booba is the rival of Change Dragon. Eventually, learning of the brain washing he went through after seeing his former love, Booba helps free Seama from the control of Gozma's before dying in a duel against Change Dragon.
- Adjutant Seama (副官シーマ, Fukukan Shīma): (Note: Also spelt as Sheema.) Seama is the former princess of Planet Amanga (アマンガ星, Amanga-sei), whose people are able to fight with psychic powers called Amanga Energy (アマンガエネルギー, Amanga Enerugī). When her planet was conquered, she was taken in by a Space Beast Warrior named Uba and raised on its milk, turning her into a cold Gorgon-themed Space Beast Warrior with a deep male voice Zuune (ズーネ, Zūne) until Changeman uses their weapon to separate, disconnect and split the link between Seama and Zunne and she manages to joins forces with the Changemen after Zuune's been defeated by Change Robo.
- Queen Ahames (女王アハメス, Joō Ahamesu): Ahames is the former queen of Planet Amazo (アマゾ星, Amazo-sei) who joined with Giluke in his attempt to overthrow Bazeu. After the attempt failed, Ahames's whereabouts were unknown until she arrives to Earth. After Giluke is killed the first time, she takes over as the leader of Gozma's forces until his return. With all her minions defeated or defected, she was transformed into a Space Beast Warrior, Maze by Super Giluke, until she's has been defeated by Change Robo.
- Navigator Gator (航海士ゲーター, Kōkaishi Gētā): Gator the navigator of the Gozmard, originally from the Planet Navi (ナビ星, Nabi-sei), is a reptilian humanoid who reluctantly joins Gozma for the safety of his family. Also for the sake of his family, he eventually defects, siding with the Changemen through the rest of the series.
- Gyodai (ギョダーイ, Gyodāi): A one-eyed creature from the planet of the same name who is used by Gozma to enlarge its minions. Left alone in a derelict Gozmard, he is rescued by the Changemen and aids them in the final battle against Bazeu.
- Jangeran (ジャンゲラン): Jangeran is the familiar of Ahames. It is a two-headed dragon/bird whose left head fires a cone of ice while its right unleashes a torrent of flame. When Bazeu grows impatient with Ahames' lack of results against the Changemen, he splits Jangeran into two separate beings called Jan (ジャン) and Geran (ゲラン).
- Hidrer Soldiers (ヒドラー兵, Hidorā-hei): (Note: Also spelt as Hydler.) Gozma's foot soldiers, these blue-skinned zombie-like aliens are feral creatures that use their talons as weapons. If wounded enough, a Hidrer would bleed steam before evaporating within seconds.

==== Space Beast Warriors ====
The Space Beast Warriors (宇宙獣士, Uchū Jūshi) are inhuman alien warriors that work for Great Star League Gozma. Gyodai would be dispatched to enlarge the Space Beast Warriors in order to fight Change Robo. In their normal size, they can speak. In giant size, all they do is roar.

- Gabu (ガブー, Gabū): A green eyeless Space Beast Warrior with a mouth-like protrusion in its mouth similar to the Xenomorph that was used by Adjutant Booba.
- Gomu (ゴーム, Gōmu): A bug-eyed monster-themed Space Beast Warrior.
- Zobi (ゾビー, Zobī): A snail-themed Space Beast Warrior from the planet Giras.
- Uba (ウーバ, Ūba): A Space Beast Warrior from the planet Amanga. He was responsible for raising Adjutant Sheema.
- Picara (ピカラ, Pikara): A crystalline mineral-themed Space Beast Warrior from the planet Picara.
- Kamira (カミラ, Kamira): A starfish-themed Space Warrior that appeared in Dengeki Sentai Changeman: The Movie.
- Marzo (マーゾ, Māzo): A plant/fairy-themed Space Warrior used by General Giluke.
- Demos (デモス, Demosu): A humanoid Plesiosaurus-themed alien named Taro (太郎 Tarō) comes from the planet Atlanta where some of his kind established Atlantis. He was turned into the Space Beast Warrior Demos by Star King Bazeu when Great Star League Gozma conquered his planet.
- Dokyura (ドキュラ, Dokyura): A vampire bat-themed Space Beast Warrior who comes from a vampire planet.
- Ooz (オーズ, Ōzu): A brain-themed Space Beast Warrior.
- Haust (ハウスト, Hausuto): A demon-themed Space Beast Warrior.
- Ghost (ゴースト, Gōsuto): A bug-eyed monster-themed Space Beast Warrior that can become invisible.
- Bamba (バンバ, Banba): An electrokinetic Space Beast Warrior.
- Ballas (バラス, Barasu): A cyborg Space Beast Warrior.
- Rogan (ロガン, Rogan): A rock-themed Space Beast Warrior.
- Gaubar (ガウバー, Gaubā): A cycloptic Space Beast Warrior with prehensile hair.
- Gilba (ジルバ, Giruba): A ball-themed Space Beast Warrior working for Queen Ahames.
- Jeeg (ジーグ, Jīgu): A birdman-themed Space Beast Warrior.
- Seala (シーラ, Shīra): A piscine humanoid/seal-themed Space Beast Warrior.
- Volta (ボルタ, Boruta): A guitar-playing bird-themed Space Beast Warrior from the planet Toora.
- Miralca (ミラルカ, Miraruka): A silicon-themed Space Beast Warrior.
- Zela (ゼーラ, Zēra): A fish-themed Space Beast Warrior who is the last survivor of the planet Poseidonia.
- Dodon (ドドン, Dodon): A salamander-themed Space Beast Warrior who appeared in Changeman Shuttle Base! The Critical Moment!
- Kiga (キーガ, Kīga): A parasite-themed Space Beast Warrior.
- Zonos (ゾノス, Zonosu): An opera-singing bat-themed Space Beast Warrior.
- Hougul (ホーグル, Hōguru): A bird of prey-themed Space Beast Warrior.
- Gilom (ギロム, Giromu): A rock-skinned bug-eyed monster-themed Space Beast Warrior.
- Pain (ペイン, Pein): A rock-skinned wart-themed Space Beast Warrior from the planet Picta.
- Gigara (ギガラ, Gigara): A reptilian humanoid/Yeti-themed Space Beast Warrior who is allied with Adjutant Booba.
- Derical (デリカル, Derikaru): A Space Beast Warrior summoned by General Giluke.
- Zolbas (ゾルバス, Zorubasu): A manta ray/butterfly-themed Space Beast Warrior sent to Earth by Star King Bazeu.
- Gizan (ギザン, Gizan): An insectoid-themed Space Beast Warrior and leader of Queen Ahames' Space Beast Warrior Trio.
- Jella (ジェラー, Jerā): A snake-themed Space Beast Warrior and member of Queen Ahames' Space Beast Warrior Trio.
- Davon (ダブン, Dabun): A gorilla-themed Space Beast Warrior with dreadlocks and member of Queen Ahames' Space Beast Warrior Trio.
- Baruruka (バルルカ, Baruruka): A bird-faced Space Beast Warrior with mechanical lights on it.
- Doron (ドロン, Doron): A Haniwa-themed Space Beast Warrior.
- Damus (ダムス, Damusu): An octopus-themed Space Beast Warrior.
- Zolte (ゾルテ, Zorute): A Common snapping turtle/witch-themed Space Beast Warrior with a large beak-like mouth and jaw.
- Bola (ボーラ, Bōra): A bat-winged lion-themed Space Beast Warrior from the dead planet Ikarus who is loyal to Icarus.
- Kaage (カーゲ, Kāge): A shadow-manipulating Space Beast Warrior.
- Gouda (ゴーダ, Gōda): A silkworm-themed Space Beast Warrior created by General Giluke.
- Zados (ザドス, Zadosu): A ghost-themed Space Beast Warrior that dwells in the Space Beast Graveyard where it was banished to. When General Giluke ended up there following his death, he merged with the body of Zados and returned to Earth as Ghost Giluke who proceeded to revive Zados. Zados was destroyed by Change Robo sending him back to the Space Beast Graveyard.
- Daros (ダロス, Darosu): A turtle/porcupine-themed Space Beast Warrior from the planet Niji who was the protector of the Nijian girl Ira, but was loyal to Great Star League Gozma.
- Galga (ガルガ, Garuga): An owl-themed Space Beast Warrior.
- Jigura (ジグラ, Jigura): An alligator-themed Space Beast Warrior from the planet Dalos.
- Bubuka (ブブカ, Bubuka): An amphibian-themed Space Beast Warrior in samurai armor and former member of Adjutant Booba's space pirates.
- Daryl (ダリル, Dariru): A piscine humanoid-themed Space Beast Warrior who comes from an unnamed planet that is the enemy of the planet Amanga.

== Episodes ==
No.	Title	Directed by	Written by	Original release date
1	""Arrival! The Secret Power!""; Transliteration: "Shutsugen! Himitsu no Chikara!" (Japanese: 出現！秘密の力！)	Nagafumi Hori	Hirohisa Soda	February 2, 1985
2	""The Wrath of Star King Bazoo""; Transliteration: "Seiō Bazū no Ikari" (Japanese: 星王バズーの怒り)	Nagafumi Hori	Hirohisa Soda	February 9, 1985
3	""Scram! Soldier Group""; Transliteration: "Sukuramu! Senshi Dan" (Japanese: スクラム! 戦士団)	Minoru Yamada	Hirohisa Soda	February 16, 1985
4	""A Kiss After the Fight""; Transliteration: "Kisu wa Tatakai no Ato de" (Japanese: キスは戦いの後で)	Minoru Yamada	Hirohisa Soda	February 23, 1985
5	""Pegasus Arrest Order""; Transliteration: "Pegasasu Taiho Shirei" (Japanese: ペガサス逮捕指令)	Minoru Yamada	Hirohisa Soda	March 2, 1985
6	""The Targeted High-School Girls""; Transliteration: "Nerawareta Joshikōsei" (Japanese: 狙われた女子高生)	Minoru Yamada	Hirohisa Soda	February 9, 1985
7	""The Sad Space Soldier""; Transliteration: "Kanashiki Uchū Senshi!" (Japanese: 悲しき宇宙戦士!！)	Minoru Yamada	Kunio Fujii	March 16, 1985
8	""The Lady is a Vampire""; Transliteration: "Ojōsan wa Kyūketsuki" (Japanese: お嬢さんは吸血鬼)	Minoru Yamada	Kunio Fujii	March 23, 1985
9	""Shine! The Deadly Miracle Ball""; Transliteration: "Kagayake! Hissatsu no Makyū" (Japanese: 輝け! 必殺の魔球)	Takao Nagaishi	Hirohisa Soda	March 30, 1985
10	""The Dreadful Driverless-Car Army""; Transliteration: "Kyōfu no Mujin-sha Gundan" (Japanese: 恐怖の無人車軍団)	Takao Nagaishi	Kunio Fujii	April 6, 1985
11	""S.O.S. Koko and Kiki""; Transliteration: "Esu Ō Esu Koko to Kiki" (Japanese: SOSココとキキ)	Minoru Yamada	Kunio Fujii	April 13, 1985
12	""Mama is Mermaid""; Transliteration: "Mama wa Māmeido" (Japanese: ママはマーメイド)	Minoru Yamada	Hirohisa Soda	April 20, 1985
13	""Papa Sells the Earth""; Transliteration: "Chikyū o Uru Papa" (Japanese: 地球を売るパパ)	Takao Nagaishi	Hirohisa Soda	April 27, 1985
14	""Attack! The Huge Lizards""; Transliteration: "Kōgeki! Kyodai Tokage" (Japanese: 攻撃！巨大トカゲ)	Takao Nagaishi	Hirohisa Soda	May 4, 1985
15	""Reckless Rider Mai""; Transliteration: "Bōsō Raidā Mai" (Japanese: 暴走ライダー麻衣)	Takao Nagaishi	Kyoko Sagiyama	May 11, 1985
16	""The Girl Who Had Wings""; Transliteration: "Tsubasa o Motta Shōjo!" (Japanese: 翼を持った少女！)	Takao Nagaishi	Kunio Fujii	May 18, 1985
17	""Nagasaki's Mysterious Ghost Ship""; Transliteration: "Nagasaki no Nazo no Yūreisen" (Japanese: 長崎の謎の幽霊船)	Minoru Yamada	Hirohisa Soda	May 25, 1985
18	""Ahames' Challenge""; Transliteration: "Ahamesu no Chōsen!" (Japanese: アハメスの挑戦！)	Minoru Yamada	Hirohisa Soda	June 1, 1985
19	""Bet on Sayaka!""; Transliteration: "Sayaka ni Kakero!" (Japanese: さやかに賭けろ！)	Minoru Yamada	Hirohisa Soda	June 8, 1985
20	""Grand Counterattack! Giluke""; Transliteration: "Dai Gyakushū! Girūku" (Japanese: 大逆襲！ギルーク)	Minoru Yamada	Hirohisa Soda	June 15, 1985
21	""Gozma's Big Star""; Transliteration: "Gozuma no Dai Sutā" (Japanese: ゴズマの大スター)	Takao Nagaishi	Hirohisa Soda	June 22, 1985
22	""The Soldier Who Disappeared Into a Mirror""; Transliteration: "Kagami ni Kieta Senshi" (Japanese: 鏡に消えた戦士)	Takao Nagaishi	Kyoko Sagiyama	June 29, 1985
23	""The Boy Who Rides Dolphins""; Transliteration: "Iruka ni Noru Shōnen" (Japanese: イルカに乗る少年)	Minoru Yamada	Kunio Fujii	July 6, 1985
24	""Runaway Gyodai""; Transliteration: "Gyodāi no Iede" (Japanese: ギョダーイの家出)	Minoru Yamada	Hirohisa Soda	July 13, 1985
25	""Sing With a Great Voice""; Transliteration: "Utae! Ōki na Koe de" (Japanese: 歌え！大きな声で)	Takao Nagaishi	Hirohisa Soda	July 20, 1985
26	""Mai's 20-Year-Old First Love""; Transliteration: "Mai Hatachi no Hatsukoi" (Japanese: 麻衣20歳の初恋)	Takao Nagaishi	Kunio Fujii	July 27, 1985
27	""Gator's Dream of Parent and Child""; Transliteration: "Gētā Oyako no Yume" (Japanese: ゲーター親子の夢)	Minoru Yamada	Hirohisa Soda	August 3, 1985
28	""The Cursed Crayon""; Transliteration: "Norowareta Kureyon" (Japanese: 呪われたクレヨン)	Minoru Yamada	Kyoko Sagiyama	August 10, 1985
29	""Protect the Flower! Phantom Butterfly""; Transliteration: "Hana o Mamore! Maboroshi no Chō" (Japanese: 花を守れ！幻の蝶)	Minoru Yamada	Kunio Fujii	August 17, 1985
30	""Run, Pegasus!""; Transliteration: "Hashire! Pegasasu!" (Japanese: 走れ！ペガサス！)	Minoru Yamada	Kunio Fujii	August 24, 1985
31	""Reveal It! The Mystery of Bazoo""; Transliteration: "Abake! Bazū no Nazo" (Japanese: 暴け！バズーの謎)	Minoru Yamada	Kunio Fujii	August 31, 1985
32	""Nana: Dangerous Reunion""; Transliteration: "Nana! Kiken na Saikai" (Japanese: ナナ！危険な再会)	Nagafumi Hori	Hirohisa Soda	September 7, 1985
33	""The End of Girook?""; Transliteration: "Girūku no Saigo!?" (Japanese: ギルークの最期！？)	Nagafumi Hori	Hirohisa Soda	September 14, 1985
34	""Ahames the Terrible""; Transliteration: "Osoroshiki Ahamesu" (Japanese: 恐ろしきアハメス)	Nagafumi Hori	Hirohisa Soda	September 21, 1985
35	""Earth, Help Us!""; Transliteration: "Chikyū yo! Tasukete!" (Japanese: 地球よ！助けて！)	Nagafumi Hori	Hirohisa Soda	September 28, 1985
36	""Behold Our Power!""; Transliteration: "Mita ka! Oretachi no Chikara" (Japanese: 見たか！俺達の力)	Minoru Yamada	Hirohisa Soda	October 5, 1985
37	""Missing Dragon""; Transliteration: "Kieta Doragon!" (Japanese: 消えたドラゴン！)	Minoru Yamada	Kunio Fujii	October 12, 1985
38	""Ghost Baseball""; Transliteration: "Yūrei Bēsubōru" (Japanese: 幽霊ベースボール)	Nagafumi Hori	Hirohisa Soda	October 19, 1985
39	""Dreadful Hide-and-Seek""; Transliteration: "Kyōfu no Kakurenbo" (Japanese: 恐怖のかくれんぼ)	Nagafumi Hori	Hirohisa Soda	October 26, 1985
40	""Strange Candy""; Transliteration: "Okashi na Okashi" (Japanese: おかしなお菓子)	Minoru Yamada	Hirohisa Soda	November 2, 1985
41	""The Missing Prince of the Stars""; Transliteration: "Kieta Hoshi no Ōji!" (Japanese: 消えた星の王子！)	Minoru Yamada	Kunio Fujii	November 9, 1985
42	""Sailor-Suited Nana""; Transliteration: "Sērāfuku no Nana" (Japanese: セーラー服のナナ)	Takao Nagaishi	Hirohisa Soda	November 16, 1985
43	""Super Giluke""; Transliteration: "Sūpā Girūku" (Japanese: スーパーギルーク)	Takao Nagaishi	Hirohisa Soda	November 23, 1985
44	""Leave it to Mai!""; Transliteration: "Mai ni O-makase!" (Japanese: 麻衣におまかせ！)	Minoru Yamada	Hirohisa Soda	November 30, 1985
45	""The Rainbow-Colored Girl Ira""; Transliteration: "Nijiiro no Shōjo Aira" (Japanese: 虹色の少女アイラ)	Minoru Yamada	Hirohisa Soda	December 7, 1985
46	""Beautiful Seama""; Transliteration: "Utsukushiki Shīma" (Japanese: 美しきシーマ！)	Minoru Yamada	Kunio Fujii	December 14, 1985
47	""Gaata's Tears of Parent and Child""; Transliteration: "Gētā Oyako no Namida" (Japanese: ゲーター親子の涙)	Takao Nagaishi	Hirohisa Soda	December 21, 1985
48	""Pirate Booba's Storm of Love""; Transliteration: "Kaizoku Būba Ai no Arashi" (Japanese: 海賊ブーバ愛の嵐)	Takao Nagaishi	Hirohisa Soda	January 8, 1986
49	""The Sad Seama Beast Soldier""; Transliteration: "Kanashiki Shīma Jūshi" (Japanese: 哀しきシーマ獣士)	Minoru Yamada	Hirohisa Soda	January 11, 1986
50	""The Day Gozma Trembled""; Transliteration: "Gozuma ga Furueta Hi" (Japanese: ゴズマが震えた日)	Minoru Yamada	Hirohisa Soda	January 18, 1986
51	""Nana, Tell Him!""; Transliteration: "Nana yo! Tsutaete!" (Japanese: ナナよ！伝えて！)	Takao Nagaishi	Hirohisa Soda	November 25, 1986
52	""Booba Dies on Earth""; Transliteration: "Būba Chikyū ni Shisu" (Japanese: ブーバ地球に死す)	Takao Nagaishi	Hirohisa Soda	February 1, 1986
53	""Fiery Ahames""; Transliteration: "Honō no Ahamesu!" (Japanese: 炎のアハメス！)	Minoru Yamada	Hirohisa Soda	February 8, 1986
54	""Girook Grand Explosion""; Transliteration: "Girūku Dai Bakuhatsu!" (Japanese: ギルーク大爆発！)	Minoru Yamada	Hirohisa Soda	February 15, 1986
55 (Final)	""Farewell, Space Friends""; Transliteration: "Saraba Uchū no Tomo yo" (Japanese: さらば宇宙の友よ)	Minoru Yamada	Hirohisa Soda	February 22, 1986

== Films ==
- Changeman theatrical short
- Changeman Shuttle Base! The Critical Moment! (Takes place sometime after episode 20 when the team has seen Giluke)

== Cast ==
- Hiryu Tsurugi: Haruki Hamada
- Sho Hayate: Kazuoki Takahashi
- Yuma Ozora: Shiro Izumi
- Sayaka Nagisa, Fake Sayaka (22), and Icarus' mother (41): Hiroko Nishimoto
- Mai Tsubasa: Mai Oishi
- Commander Yui Ibuki: Jun Fujimaki
- Officer Suzuki: Genshu Suzuki
- Officer Shoji: Hirokazu Shoji
- Officer Watanabe: Minoru Watanabe
- Officer Nomoto: Nahoko Nomoto
- Officer Kikuchi: Kaori Kikuchi
- Waraji: Kazuhiko Ohara
- Nana: Tokie Shibata
- General Giluke: Shohei Yamamoto
- Queen Ahames; Voice of Maze: Fukumi Kuroda
- Star King Bazeu: Kazuto Kuwabara
- Adjutant Booba: Yoshinori Okamoto
- Adjutant Seama: Kana Fujieda

=== Voice actors ===
- Star King Bazeu: Seizō Katō
- Adjutant Seama (Male voice): Michiro Iida
- Navigator Gator: Hiroshi Masuoka
- Gyodai: Takeshi Watabe
- Zoorii: Makoto Kōsaka
- Narration: Nobuo Tanaka

== Crew ==
- Directors: Minoru Yamada, Takao Nagaishi, Nagafumi Hori
- Writers: Hirohisa Soda, Kunio Fujii, Kyoko Sagiyama
- Action Directors: Junji Yamaoka, Ryoujirou Nishimoto

== Songs ==
The opening theme is "Dengeki Sentai Changeman" (電撃戦隊チェンジマン, Dengeki Sentai Chenjiman) and the closing theme is "Never Stop Changeman" (Never Stopチェンジマン, Nebā Sutoppu Chenjiman). Both have lyrics by Yoshiaki Sagara (さがら よしあき, Sagara Yoshiaki), music by Katsuo Ohno (大野 克夫, Ōno Katsuo), arrangements by Tatsumi Yano (矢野 立美, Yano Tatsumi) and were sung by Kage.

== Broadcast and home video ==
- In its home country of Japan, the series aired in TV Asahi from February 2, 1985, to February 22, 1986, airing every Saturday at 6.00 p.m. Both of the Changeman films were released on VHS. Dengeki Sentai Changeman: The Movie and Dengeki Sentai Changeman: Shuttle Base! The Critical Moment! as well as on DVD for "Super Sentai THE MOVIE BOX" on July 21, 2003, later released on "Super Sentai The MOVIE VOL.3" on July 21, 2004, and a Blu-Ray release on June 21, 2011, as part of the "Super Sentai THE MOVIE Blu-Ray BOX 1976-1995." In 2009 from June 21 till October 21, the full series was released on home video for the first time with five DVD volumes and each volume contains 11 episodes in a 2-disc set. Seven episodes (being 1, 33, 43, 51-53 and 55) are included in the Super Sentai Ichimi Blu-ray 1982-1986" released on April 14, 2021, for a Blu-Ray release.
- In Thailand, the series was aired with a Thai dub in 1987 on Channel 7, distributed and licensed by TIGA Company, Ltd. There were also two Thai dubs made for home video over the years, one released by Square Video and another later on by Focus, bringing the total of three Thai dubs.
- The series was broadcast in Brazil under the title Esquadrão Relâmpago Changeman (Lightning Squadron Changeman) and was readily available on VHS throughout Mid-1987 with all 55 episodes dubbed in Brazilian Portuguese (produced between 1986 and 1987) and available as it was sold throughout several volumes, licensed by Everest Video Do Brasil when Toshihiko Egawara got the official rights from Toei to bring it over. The series then got extremely popular when it first aired on Rede Manchete on February 22, 1988, when it aired on prime time and became a huge hit. Changeman is the first Super Sentai series to air in the region and has enjoyed unprecedented success along with another Toei tokusatsu series MegaBeast Investigator Juspion (which aired as O Fantástico Jaspion) as that aired on the exact same day on the same channel, causing them to air more tokusatsu shows. Years later, it continued re-runs on other channels as well. On July 23, 2009, it even started receiving a full DVD release in two volumes by Focus Filmes with all episodes included with both the original Japanese audio with Brazilian Portuguese subtitles and also the Brazilian Portuguese dub included. Sato Company acquired the license to the series in 2015, until it expired in June 2021, due to Hasbro owning and controlling broader international rights, due to the connection of Power Rangers which adapts from Toei's Super Sentai, outside of Japan and the rest of Asia. This even includes the Sentai entries that were never adapted.
- In South Korea, the series was imported and dubbed in Korean in 1993 exclusively for home video by Daeyoung Panda and released under the same title as the original Japanese title (전격전대 체인지맨, Jeongyeogjeondae Cheinjimaen). This marks the first and only time that a Korean dubbed Sentai kept the title as is. As for the Korean dub of Kaizoku Sentai Gokaiger, it was officially renamed as Power Rangers Changeman. (파워레인저 체인지맨)
