= Egaku =

9th century Japanese monk

- 恵萼
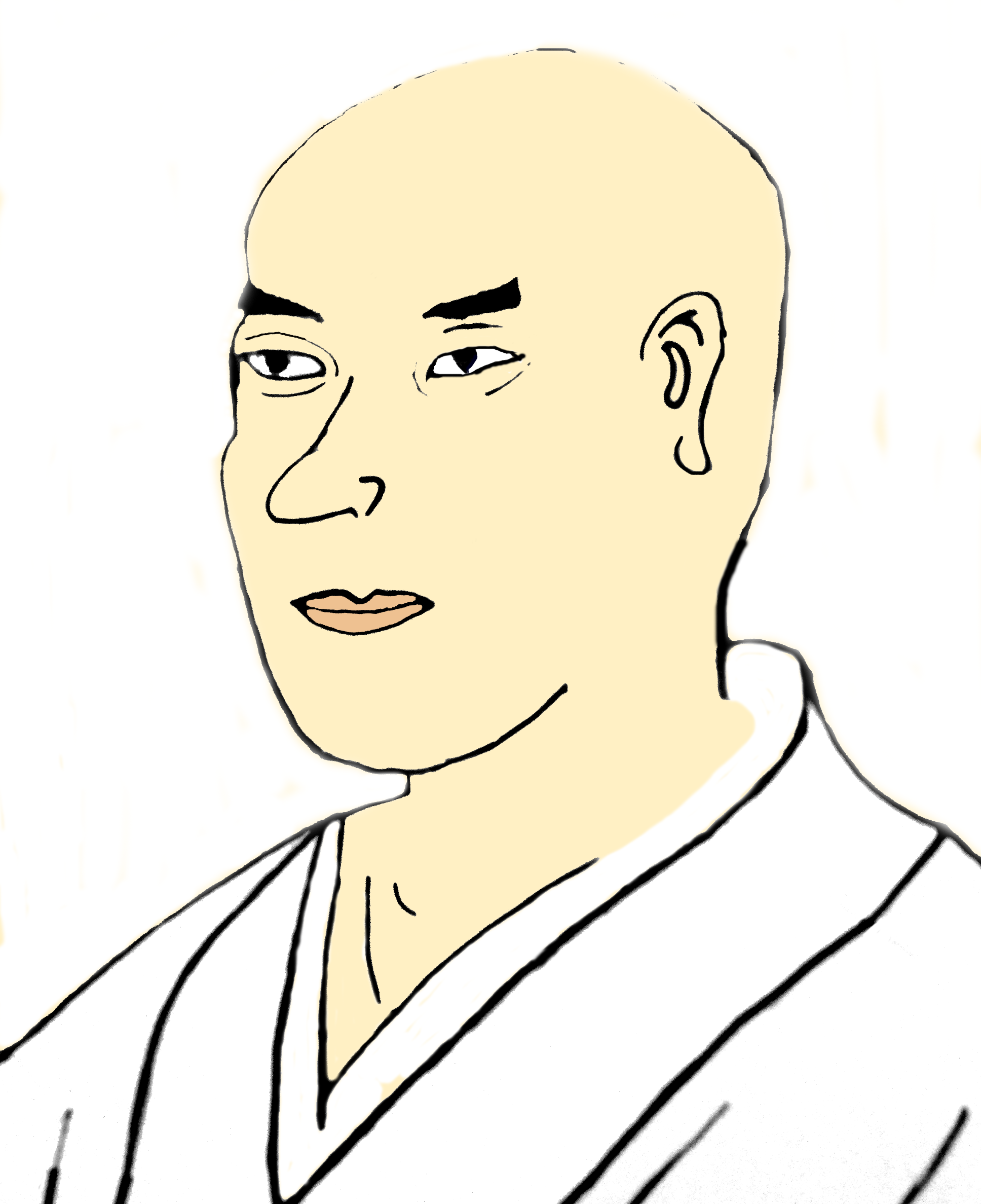
- Modern drawing of Egaku (early Heian period - early 9th century CE)

Personal life
- Born: unknown but before 822 (Note: Saichō died in 822 CE; as Egaku was his disciple, he was born before 822 CE); Japan
- Died: unknown but after 864 CE; Japan
- Flourished: 9th Century CE
- Occupation: Buddhist monk, scholar

Religious life
- Religion: Buddhism
- School: Zen (Note: Foguangshan p 7605 慧萼日本臨濟宗僧。Hui'E, a Japanese Rinzai sect monk.), Tendai

Senior posting
- Teacher: Saichō, Yanguan Qi’an
- Disciples: Jinsai (仁斎), Junshō (順昌) (Note: Putuoshan 于是，留下弟子仁济、顺昌两人，白己朝礼天台山...Egaku went by himself on a pilgrimage to Mount Tiantai [home to the Chinese Tiantai sect, the ancestral home of the Japanese Tendai sect] and left behind his two disciples Jinsai and Junshō...])

Chinese name
- Traditional Chinese: 慧鍔
- Simplified Chinese: 慧锷
Transcriptions
Standard Mandarin
- Hanyu Pinyin: Huì'è
- Wade–Giles: Hui^{4} o^{4}

Vietnamese name
- Vietnamese: Huệ Ngạc or Tuệ Ngạc

Korean name
- Hangul: 혜악
- Hanja: 慧鍔
Transcriptions
- Revised Romanization: Hyeak

Japanese name
- Hiragana: えがく

Egaku or Hui'E (Note: Egaku or Hui'E did not have a standardized Chinese character name. However, all of these names were either Chinese or Japanese homonyms respectively.) was a well-connected 9th century Japanese scholar-monk (Note: Chen 于是命慧萼到齐安处留学 ，可以看出慧萼还不是一个普通的入唐求法僧人 ，其一举一动都代表着皇族的意思 ，与日本王室有着很深的渊源 。[Tachibana Kachiko (Empress Dowager)] commanded Hui'E to find Yanguan Qi'an so that he could learn Zen from him. Hui'E was not an ordinary monk traveling to Tang China at liberty to learn as he wished. For every movement he made, was on behalf of the [Japanese] royal house, and he had a deep relationship with them.) who made frequent trips to Tang China for pilgrimage and bringing back Buddhist teachings to Japan. Egaku had a huge impact on the religious and cultural history of China and Japan. (Note: Tanaka ９世紀に日唐を頻繁に往来し、日中の宗教・文化に多大の影響を与えた日本僧慧萼について…Regarding Egaku who frequently traveled to and from Japan and China and who had a huge impact on the religion and culture of Japan and China) In Japan, he is famous for bringing the first Rinzai Zen monk Gikū (Note: Foguangshan p.7605 後參謁杭州靈池寺齊安國師，轉達太后之旨，延請義空禪師赴日弘揚禪法，自此日本始傳臨濟宗。Later Egaku visited the national preceptor Yanguan Qi'an at Hangzhou's Lingchi Monastery and communicated the wishes of the Empress Dowager (for a Zen monk). Yikong [Gikū in Japanese] was then dispatched to Japan to propagate the Zen teachings. The Japanese Rinzai sect began in this manner.) and the works of the Chinese poet Bai Juyi to Japan. In China, he is renowned for his role in establishing a developed pilgrimage site in Putuoshan, one of the four major Buddhist pilgrimage sites in China. (Note: Wang 据明崇祯年间高僧木陈道忞所撰《普陀山梵音庵释迦文佛舍利塔碑》记载：…去明州薄海五百里外，复有山曰补怛洛迦者，则普门大士化亦所显，以佛菩萨慈悲姻缘故，故自晋之大康，…说明早在东晋南北朝，已有信徒们纷纷来山朝拜。According to the disciple of Tiantong Temple's Miyun, the Chinese Linji sect monk and then later the Hongjue National Preceptor, Muchen Daowen's (1596-1674) "Putuoshan Brahma Monastery Sarira Pagoda of Shakyamuni Buddha Stele" carved during the Chong Zhen regnal era (1622-1644), it is recorded: …Five hundred li from Mingzhou (today’s Ningbo), there is a mountain called Potalaka, this is where the Mahāsattva of Potalaka manifests, due to the karmic affinities of the Buddha and Bodhisattva's Great Compassion, starting from the Jin Dynasty Tai Kang regnal period… This quote explains that as early as the Eastern Jin dynasty period and the Northern and Southern Dynasties period, there were already worshipers coming one after another to Putuoshan for pilgrimage.) (Note: Putuoshan 后人尊称慧锷为普陀山佛教开山祖师。Later generations respectfully named Hui'E as the founder of Putuoshan.)

== Life ==
Unlike his monastic contemporaries Saichō, Kūkai and Ennin, Egaku did not leave any travel diaries. (Note: Ennin p 810 [Although Egaku did not write any travel diary, he is mentioned in Ennin's Diary...] 841 CE 9th Day of the 7th Moon I heard that the Japanese monk Egaku and his disciples, three persons in all, had arrived at Mt. Wu-t'ai. The Master had vowed, in order to seek his alms in all directions, he would return to his homeland, but he is having his two disciples stay at Mt. Wu-t'ai.) The information known about him came from numerous Chinese and Japanese sources, and therefore, there are still many unclear points about him, such as the dates and specific location of his birth and death. However, he was a disciple of Saichō and possibly was an acquaintance of Kūkai.

== Legacy in Japan ==
Egaku did not travel to Tang China as part of an official mission from Japan in contrast to some of his monastic contemporaries. However, his travel was on the personal behest of the Empress Dowager Tachibana Kachiko, a devout Buddhist with religious and literary renown, (Note: Reeves p 352–3 Inoue (in Inoue, “Danrin kōgō (Tachibana no Kachiko),” 64; the original text is found in Buntoku Jitsuroku (one of the six traditional Japanese histories), Kashō 3 (850).5.5, where the passage translated above reads, in the original, as follows: 后為人寬和風容絶異手過於膝髪委於地観者皆驚.) argues, that Kachiko’s contemporaries certainly associated her with Hokkeji Temple, and especially with the figure of the Eleven-Faced Avalokitesvara, who also had hands reaching to her knees.) who was curious about Zen Buddhism after talking to Kūkai. Egaku after that went on several trips to Tang China, most of them on behalf of the Empress Dowager.

In 841 CE, Egaku went to Tang China on a pilgrimage to Mount Wutai, the bodhimaņḍa of Manjuśri Bodhisattva. From there, he traveled to Hangzhou where he visited and offered gifts from the Empress Dowager to Yanguan Qi'an, a renowned 9th generation Chan Buddhist master descended from Mazu Daoyi. (Note: Foguangshan p 7472 宣宗敕諡「悟空大師」之號，並以御詩追悼。[Yanguan Qi'an died in 842 CE in his 90s before the ascension of Emperor Tang Xuānzong.] Emperor Xuānzong awards Yanguan Qi'an, the title "Wukong National Preceptor" and mourned him with imperial poetry. He was a distant member of the Tang royal family surnamed Li.) Egaku then returned to Japan.

In 844 CE, Egaku went again to Tang China. He visited and made religious offerings at Mount Wutai and Linchi Monastery; (Note: Hangzhou's Linchi Monastery was located in Yanguan, 50 kilometers away from Hangzhou and was later bestowed the name An'guo Monastery by Emperor Xuānzong. The Monastery was taken down in 1978.) the Empress Dowager personally made embroidered monastic robes and religious banners for this purpose. (Note: Katsūra Egaku gave some of the offerings to shrines dedicated to manifestations of Avalokiteśvara Bodhisattva.) On this trip, Egaku witnessed and personally experienced the effect of Emperor Wuzong's Huichang persecution, which delayed his return to Japan. (Note: Chen With the onset of the Huichang persecution, Hui'E went into hiding in Suzhou's Baisheren Chan Monastery under the false identity of a Buddhist layperson named Kongwu. He tried to leave on a ship from Chuzhou, but they blocked all ships from leaving. The persecution forced him to hide for over a year until the ascension of Emperor Xuānzong.) With the ascension of Emperor Xuanzong in 846 CE, the abuse ended, and Egaku returned with Yanguan Qi'an's chief disciple Gikū who became the first Zen master in Japan. (Note: Foguangshan 7010 與道昉等東渡日本--Gikū was accompanied by Dōhō and others on his trip east to Japan.)

Aristocratic Heian society enthusiastically received Gikū's arrival in Japan as he was the first Zen monk from China who exclusively taught Zen Buddhism in Japan. (Note: Although Japan had earlier Zen masters who either came or returned to Japan, such as Dōshō and Dōsen, they also taught the teachings of other sects. As such, Gikū is the first exclusively Zen master from the Southern School to reside in the new capital of Heian-kyō.) (Note: Ōtsuki また橘嘉智子だけでなく皇帝（仁明天皇）や中散大夫藤公兄弟といった官僚の帰依も厚かったことが知られる。Records indicate that not only Tachibana Kachiko but the Emperor Ninmyō and the bureaucrat Chūsan Daifu Fujiwara brothers were sincere and also took refuge with Gikū.) Tachibana Kachiko first housed him in the western wing of Tō-ji Temple; then moved him to Danrin Temple once it became completed. (Note: Groner Danrin Temple was also a nunnery for nuns who observed the bhikkuni precepts. Tachibana Kachiko herself became a nun once her Emperor son Ninmyō became sick and lived at Danrin Temple until her death.) Gikū taught Zen Buddhism for several years there and then returned to Tang China. (Note: Ōtsuki さらに師蛮は，義空伝の賛において，義空渡来後「...，実悟せし者，橘后一人のみ，空公，時未だ熟せざるを知り，之を辞して帰唐す」と記し...Mangen Shiban (1626-1710), a Japanese Rinzai Zen scholar-monk who wrote two Buddhist histories the "Enpō Record of the Transmission of the Lamp" and the "Honchō Records of the High Priest" said in his praises of the Record of Gikū, after Gikū arrived in Japan, "...Tachibana Kachiko was the only person who truly understood [Zen]. Gikū thought the time was not ripe for Zen. Therefore, he resigned and then returned to Tang China...", ...田中史生氏によると滞在期間は十年にも満たなかった可能性が高く，856（唐・大中10，日本・斉衡 3 ）年前後までの間と推定されている。According to Tanaka Fumio, it is very likely Gikū only stayed in Japan for less than ten years. He theorizes its highly likely that Gikū stayed only until sometime around 856 CE.) (Note: Hibino こ，に当時の禅の受容のあり方を知ることができる。…呪術的に受け入れられたのであった。斯様に歪曲されて受容された禅は、....禅そのものを理会することもできず――従って必要ともしない状態の中にあって、その後に継承・発展するべくもなかった... From this, we know Heian society accepted Zen in the form of mantra ceremonies. This type of convoluted acceptance made society unable to understand Zen itself, and since [the distinctive aspects unique to Zen] was unneeded then, [Zen] was unable to be passed down and develop.) (Note: Dōshō, Dōsen, Gikū and later Kakua attempted to introduce Zen into Japan. All failed in their attempts. It would take four hundred more years after Giku before Zen firmly established itself in Japan in the 13th century. cf. Eisai, Dogen and Nanpo Shōmyō.)

Also in 846/847 CE, Egaku brought his hand-copied manuscript of the "Collected Works of Bai Juyi" to Japan. The poems of the famous Chinese poet Bai Juyi were already introduced earlier into Japan. (Note: Although there were other Japanese who had already introduced Bai Juyi's Poetry into Japan such as Ennin's 6 scroll copy of the "Collected Works of Bai Juyi" in 839 and Fujiwara no Okamori's (808-851 CE) copy of "Yuan Bai Shi Ji" or "Selection of Yuan Zhen and Bai Juyi's Poetry" in 838 CE, both were incomplete.) However, Egaku's copy was a complete early copy and had a significant influence on subsequent Japanese Sinitic poetry and native literature such as The Tale of Genji and The Pillow Book.

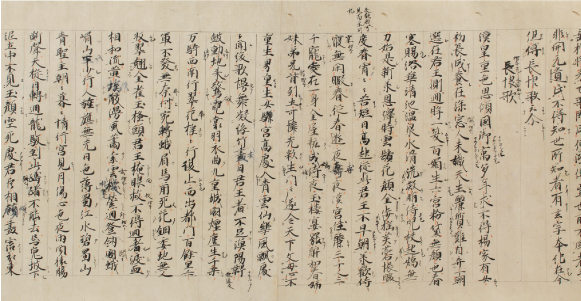
Page of 'Collected Works of Bai Juyi' - showing poem 'Song of the Everlasting Regret' - Gotoh Museum

The Kanazawa edition is a copy of Egaku's original document. Kept initially at the Kanazawa library founded in the Kamakura period, the Kanazawa edition is no longer a complete copy. The Kanazawa edition preserves the original form of the "Collected Works of Bai Juyi" as revised by Bai Juyi himself. This edition also has Egaku's annotated notes, which describe the historical circumstances facing Egaku when he was copying the text.

On possibly his last trip to Tang China (863 CE), Egaku accompanied the ex-crown prince turned Buddhist monk Takaoka Shinnō (高丘親王) into Tang China. Takaoka Shinnō later was reputed to have attempted travel to India by ship from Guangzhou in 865 CE, in pursuit of answers to his questions related to Buddhism. Unfortunately, he reportedly died in Singapore. (Note: Takaoka Shinno left with three followers in 865 CE by ship from Guangzhou destination India. Afterward, people in Tang China lost contact with him. Sixteen years later in 881 CE, Chūkan, a Japanese scholar-monk visiting Tang China reported that Takaoka Shinnō had died in Singapore. Some other sources mentioned that a tiger killed Takaoka Shinnō. Recently an imperial pagoda was erected in Johor Bahru's Japanese cemetery.)

Egaku also had an "agate-colored stele" made on his behalf in Suzhou's Kaiyuan Monastery by the Chinese Zen monk Qieyuan, entitled "Record of the Nation of Japan’s First Zen School." (Note: Chen 慧萼还专门请苏州开元寺高僧契元制作了一块题为枟日本国首传禅宗记枠的玛瑙石碑立在罗城门侧 。Hui'E asked the senior monk of Suzhou's Kaiyuan Monastery Qieyuan, to compose an agate(-colored) stele entitled "Record of the Nation of Japan's First Zen School." The stele was later placed to the side of Heian-kyō's Rashōmon Gate.) This agate stele once stood in Heian-kyō's Rashōmon, and Tōdai-ji once preserved four large fragments of this stele. The significance of this agate stele is that it was one of the few contemporaneous records describing Egaku's recruitment of Gikū as the first Zen monk to Japan. It was one of the sources used by Kokan Shiren to write the Egaku article found in Japan's earliest Buddhist history, the Genkō Shakusho.

== Legacy in China ==
Egaku in China
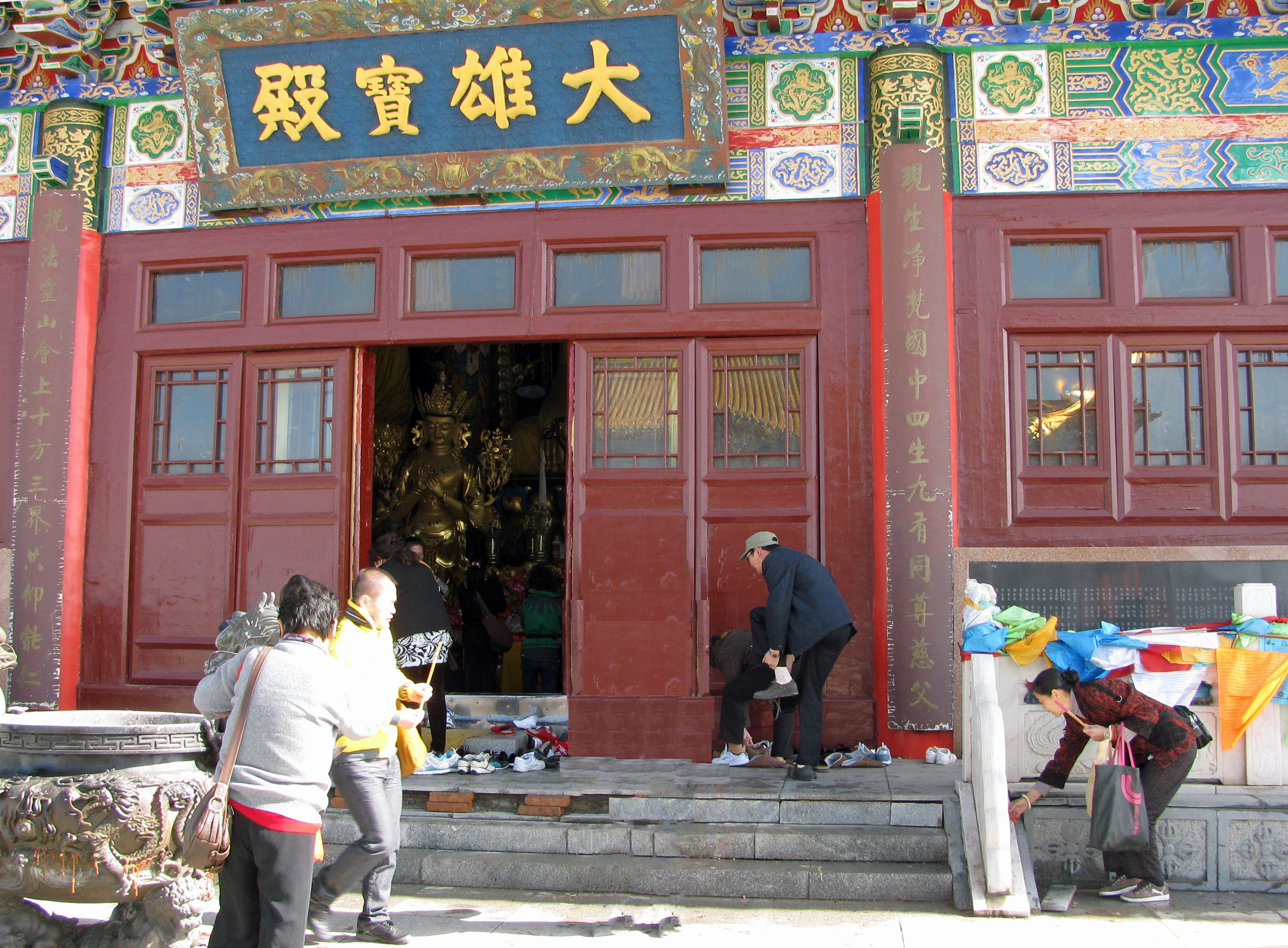
Egaku obtained a statue of Avalokitesvara from the Central Peak of Mount Wutai. Photo shows a modern temple located on the top of the Central Peak.

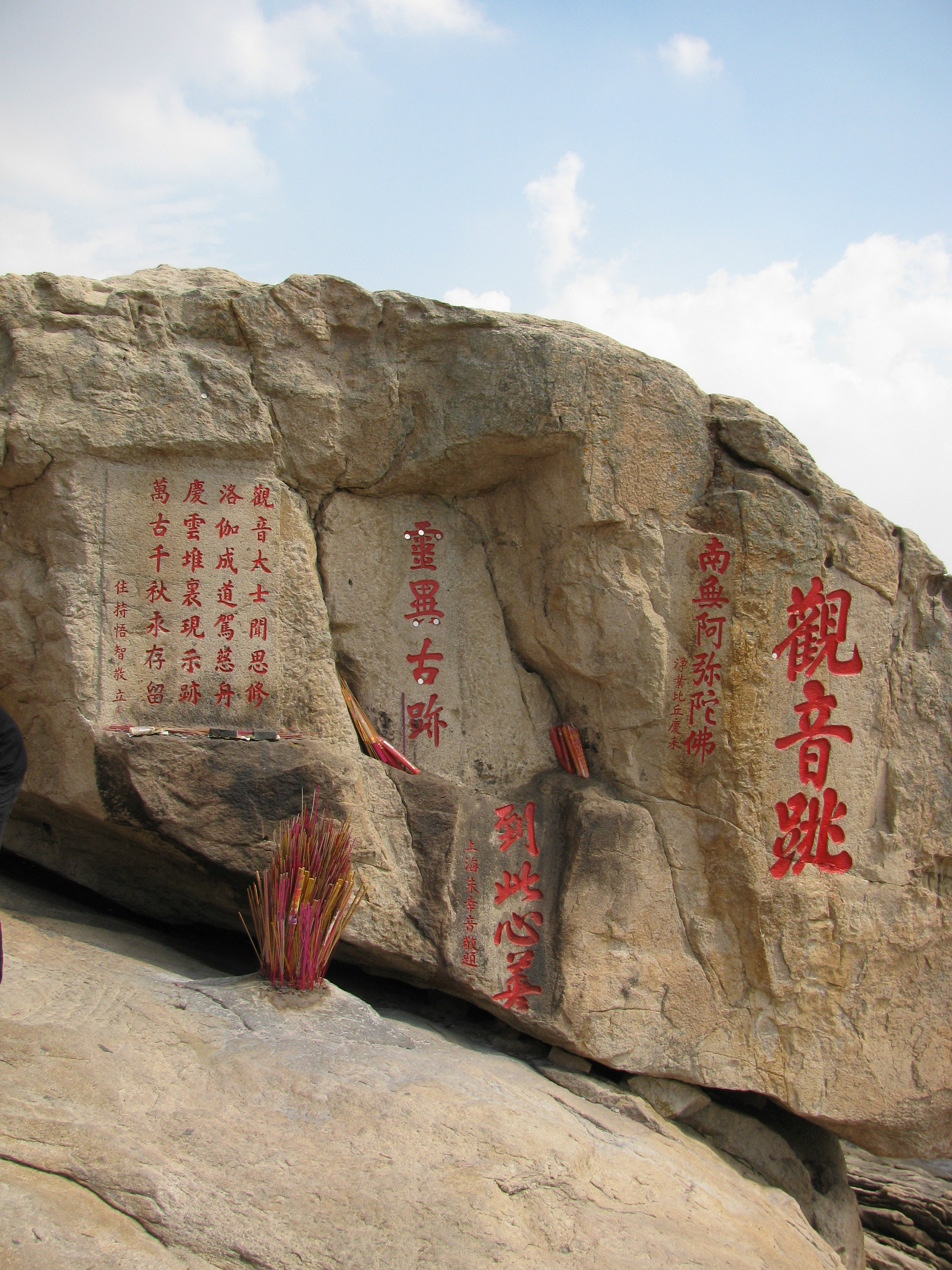
Guanyin Leaps is on Mount Putuo. Silla Reef is to the east of Guanyin Leaps. Egaku's ship ran aground on Silla Reef.

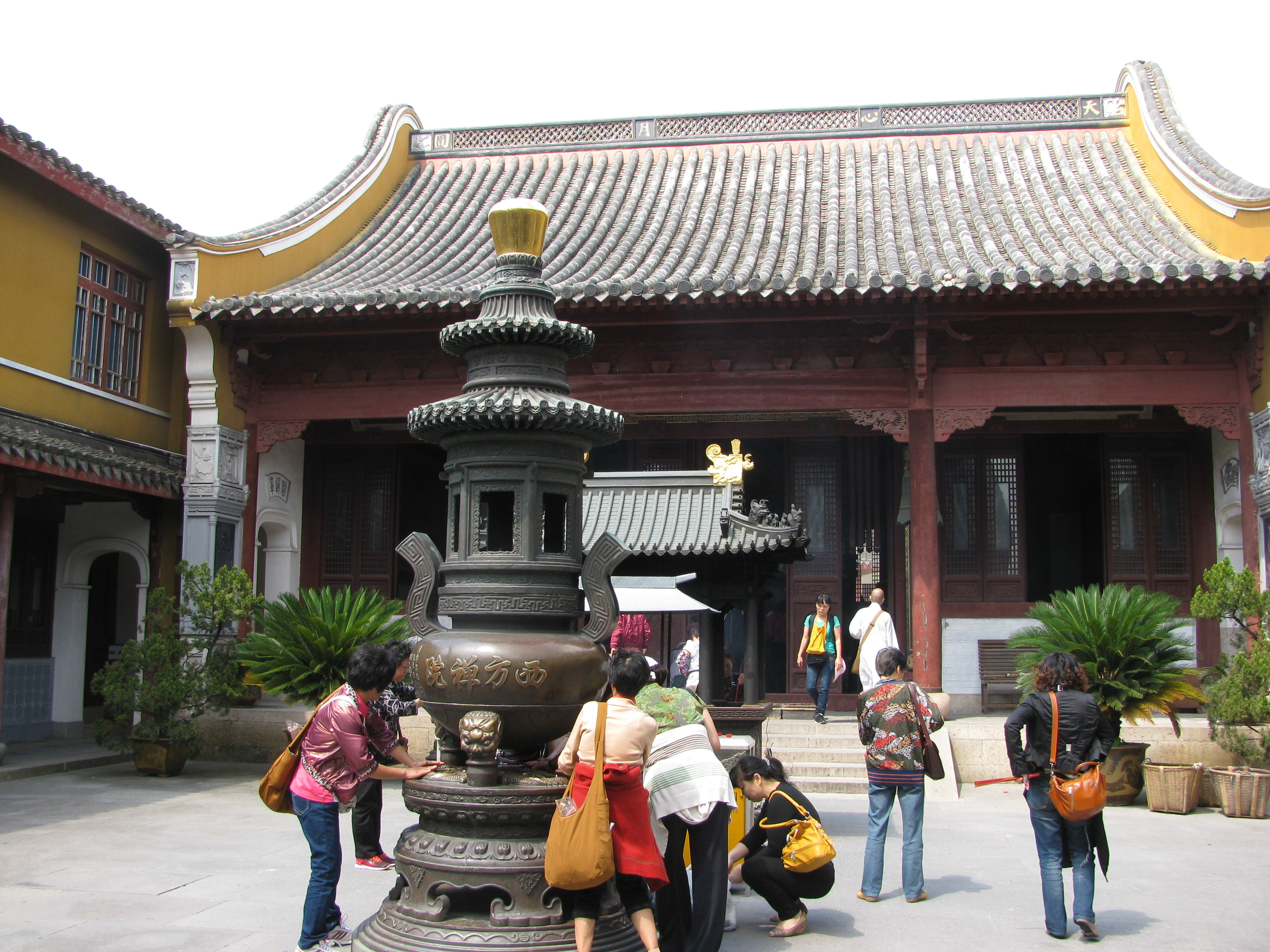
Xifang Jingyuan is next to Guanyin Leaps on Mount Putuo. The temple houses a memorial hall commemorating Egaku.

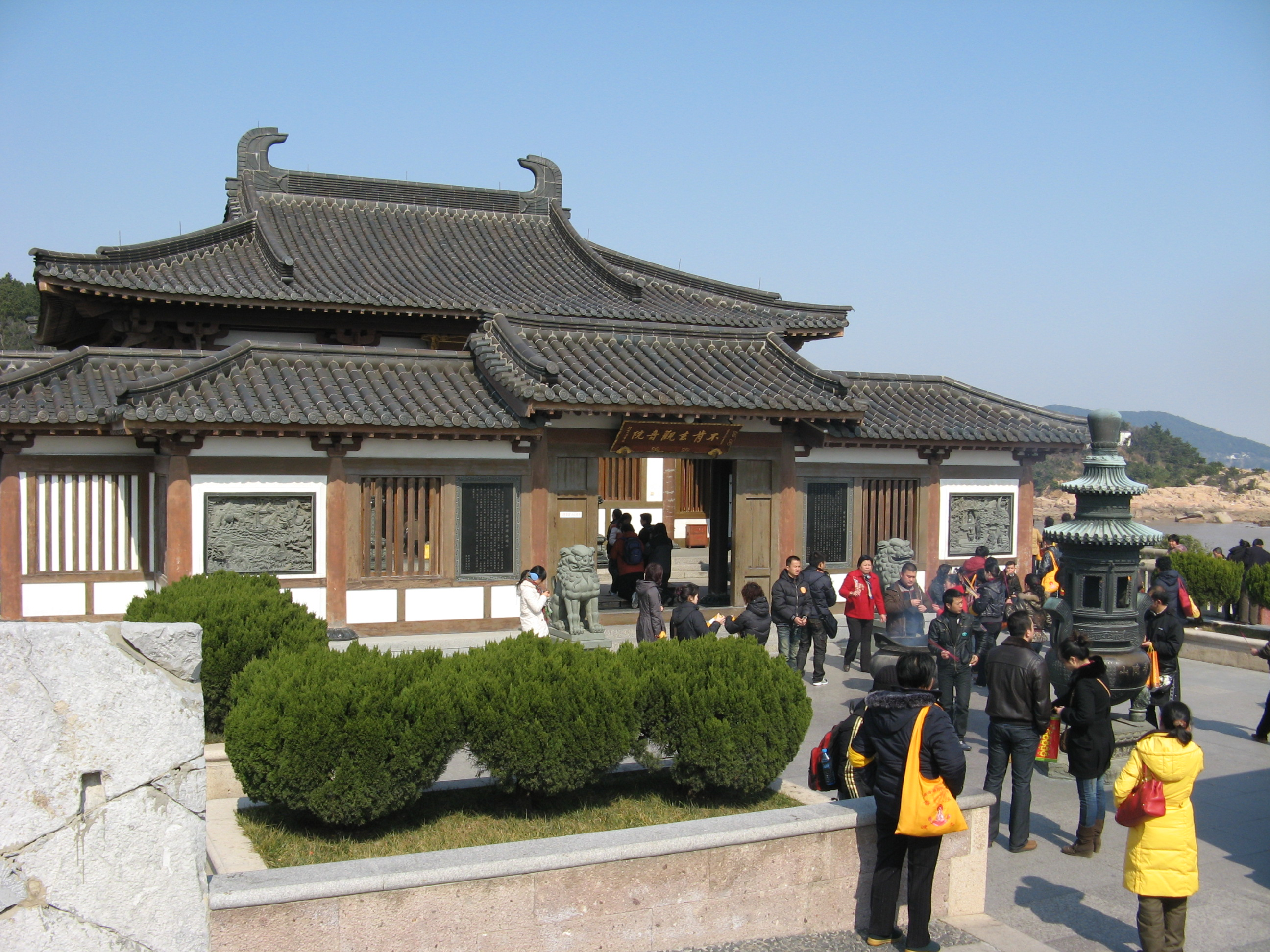
Unwilling to Leave Guanyin Temple was the name of the first permanent shrine for Egaku's statue of Avalokitesvara Bodhisattva on Mount Putuo. Today's temple commemorate this event.

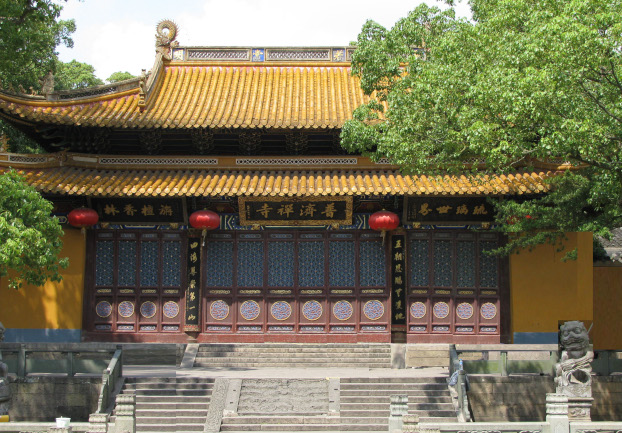
Puji Temple is the current name of the temple formerly called Unwilling to Leave Guanyin Temple. It is the site where a fisherman by the surname of Zhang, first moved and housed the sacred statue of Guanyin left behind by Egaku near the Cave of Tidal Sounds.

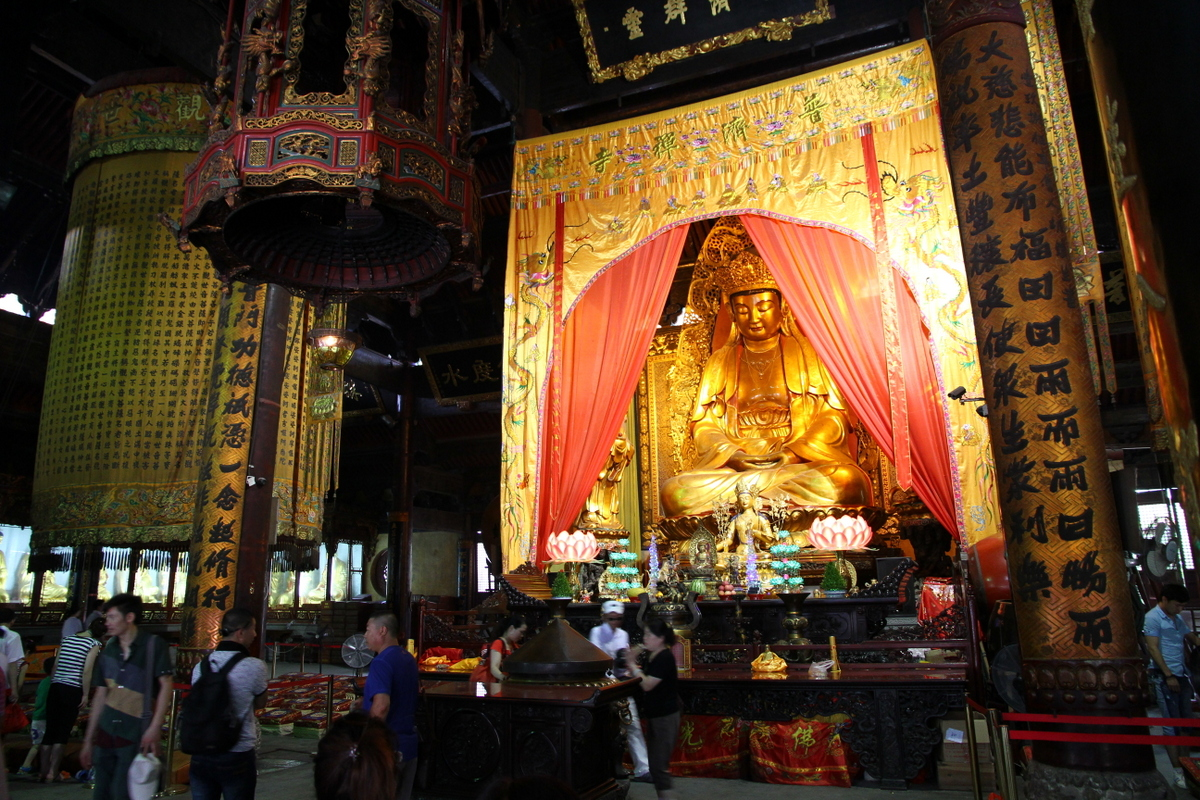
Puji Temple's Universal Treasure Hall features an 8.8 meter high seated 8 petal Vairocana-crowned Guanyin Bodhisattva accompanied by Sudhana and Nāgakanya. Adjacent on both sides are statues of 32 forms of Guanyin Bodhisattva.

In 863 Egaku went again on a pilgrimage to Mount Wutai. This time, he saw a wooden statue of Avalokiteśvara Bodhisattva with an elegant and refined appearance and an ever-joyful face while on a trip to a temple located in the central peak of Mount Wutai. (Note: Park 日本国僧惠锷诣五台山敬礼。至中台精舍，见观音貌像端雅，喜生颜间，乃就恳求愿迎归其国，寺众从之。The Japanese monk Hui'E went on a pilgrimage on Mount Wutai. He arrived at a temple on the Central Peak. (Mount Wutai has five mountain peaks - the Central peak is one of them) He stood in awe of a statue of Avalokiteśvara Bodhisattva with an elegant and refined appearance and with an ever-joyful face. Moreover, he then beseeches [the monks of Mount Wutai] to allow him to take it back to Japan after which the monks agreed.) Egaku wished to take this statue back to Japan and asked for the monks’ permission. The monks acquiesced to his request. He brought the statue to Ningbo's Kaiyuan Monastery on a palanquin, located the merchant Zhang Youxing's ship, and prepared to leave for Japan. However, the statue became extremely heavy, and he was unable to bring it onto the ship. Egaku succeeded in bringing the statue aboard the ship only with the combined efforts of numerous merchants from Silla. The boat then set sailed and approached the waters near Putuoshan where huge angry waves and violent winds impeded its progress. The ship went aground on Silla Reef (Note: Park 新罗礁位于离普陀山岛“观音跳”东侧...Silla Reef is a reef off the coast of Putuoshan to the east of the site called "Guanyin Leaps".) and then it drifted to the Cave of Tidal Sounds. Egaku that evening had a dream where he saw a foreign monk who told him, "If you place me on this mountain, I will command the winds to send you on your way." (Note: Wang 胡僧就是菩萨化身 the foreign monk is a manifestation of [Avalokiteśvara] Bodhisattva.) Egaku told everyone aboard of his dream, and everyone was astonished. Still, they came ashore and built a straw hut to place the statue of Avalokiteśvara Bodhisattva. After making farewell obeisance to the statue, they boarded the ship and left for Japan. An inhabitant of Putuoshan surname Zhang witnessed these events and enshrined the statue in his house for worship. After his death, they built the first permanent shrine to Guanyin Bodhisattva on Putuoshan in 916 CE, named "Unwilling to Leave Guanyin Temple." Later generations of worshipers honored Egaku as the founder of the Avalokiteśvara bodhimanda on Putuoshan. (Note: Binghenheimer Wang Liansheng draws attention to the fact that some thirteenth century sources cite the Tang poet and official Wei Xuan 韋絢 (801-866) as a source for the association of Mount Putuo with Egaku. According to the Baoqing Siming Zhi (1226), Wei Xuan had left a record concerning the events of Egaku’s return voyage, which must be considered contemporary. Unfortunately, Wei Xuan's text is now lost, but I agree with Wang Liansheng that this reference in the Baoqing Siming Zhi makes it likely that Egaku was indeed involved in the founding of Mount Putuo. In all likelihood his visit took place in 859 or 863 CE.) Putuoshan now has an "Master Egaku Commemorative Hall" with a shrine dedicated to Egaku and thirty-three manifestations of Avalokitesvara located at Xifang Jingyuan, the temple next to Guanyin Leaps

== Modern Discoveries ==
Archaeologists discovered a stone dharani pillar decorated with three entwining dragons and engraved with the text of the Uṣṇīṣa Vijaya Dhāraṇī Sūtra in Kyoto's Anshō-ji Temple in 1953. Egaku brought this column back to Japan either in 841 or 842 CE. One can see the column on display at the Kyoto National Museum.

== Movies ==
In the acclaimed 2013 movie Avalokitesvara, a loose adaptation of the Putuoshan genesis story, Nagaizumi Hideo starred as Egaku.

== Sources ==
- Binghenheimer, Marcus (2016). Island of Guanyin Mount Putuo and Its Gazetteers. Oxford University Press. ISBN 9780190456191.
- Chen, Chong (陈翀) (2010). 慧萼东传枟白氏文集枠及普陀洛迦开山考 [On the Spread of Baishi Wenji to Japan by Hui E and the First Temple on Putuo‐Luojia Mountain]. 浙江大学学报 (人文社会科学版) Journal of Zhejiang University (Humanities and Social Sciences Edition) (in Simplified Chinese). 40 (5): 44–54.
- Ennin (1955) [850]. 入唐求法巡禮行記 [Ennin's Diary: The Record of a Pilgrimage to China in Search of the Law]. Translated by Reischauer, Edwin O. ISBN 9780826074003.
- Foguangshan Foundation for Buddhist Culture and Education (佛光山文教基金會) (1989). 慧萼 [Hui'E]. 佛光山大詞典 (Foguangshan Dictionary of Buddhism) (in Traditional Chinese). p. 7605. ISBN 9789574571956.
- Foguangshan Foundation for Buddhist Culture and Education (佛光山文教基金會) (1989). 齊安 [Qi'an]. 佛光山大詞典 (Foguangshan Dictionary of Buddhism) (in Traditional Chinese). p. 7472. ISBN 9789574571956.
- Foguangshan Foundation for Buddhist Culture and Education (佛光山文教基金會) (1989). 義空 [Yikong]. 佛光山大詞典 (Foguangshan Dictionary of Buddhism) (in Traditional Chinese). p. 7010. ISBN 9789574571956.
- Groner, Paul (1997). Ryogen and Mount Hiei: Japanese Tendai in the Tenth Century. University of Hawaii Press. ISBN 9780824822606.
- Hashimoto, Shinkichi (橋本進吉) (1972) [1922]. "慧蕚和尚年譜 (Chronology of the Monk Egaku)". 橋本進吉博士著作集 [Collected Works Authored by Dr. Hashimoto Shinkichi] (in Japanese). Vol. 12. 岩波書店.
- Hibino, Kō (日比野晃) (1972). 禅の受容についての一考察―橘嘉智子と栄西の場合 [A Study on the Reception of Zen in Japan-The Case Study on Tachibana Kachiko and Eisai]. 中日本自動車短期大学論叢 (in Japanese) (3–4): 107–114.
- Katsūra, Noriko (勝浦令子) (2017). 平安期皇后・皇太后の＜漢＞文化受容――信仰を中心に―― [Acceptance of Chinese culture by the Empress and Empress Dowagers of the Heian Period ---From the Viewpoint of Religious Beliefs]. 中古文学会春季大会・平安文学における＜漢＞の受容ーーその日本化の様相 (in Japanese): 107–120.
- Ōtsuki, Yōko (大槻暢子) (2008). 唐僧義空についての初歩的考察――唐商徐公祐から義空への書簡―― [A Preliminary Study of the Tang Monk Giku: The Letters Addressed to Tang Priest Giku from a Tang Merchant Jokoyu]. 東アジア文化交渉研究 (in Japanese). 1: 129–140.
- Park, Hyun-kyu (扑現圭[박현규]) (2003). 中国佛教圣地普陀山与新罗礁 [China’s Buddhist Holy Land Putuoshan and Silla Reef]. 浙江大学学报 (人文社会科学版) Journal of Zhejiang University (Humanities and Social Sciences Edition) (in Simplified Chinese). 33 (1). Translated by Yang, Yulei (杨雨雷). (Original language in Korean): 39–46.
- Putuoshan (2017). 慧锷 [Hui E [Egaku]]. 普陀山佛教网 (in Simplified Chinese).
- Putuoshan-en (2017). "Bukenqu (Unwilling to Go) Guanyin Temple". 普陀山佛教网.
- Reeves, Kristopher L. (2018). Of Poetry, Patronage and Politics: From Saga to Michizane, Sinitic Poetry in the Early Heian Court. Columbia University.
- Tanaka, Fumio (田中史生); Ge, Jiyong (葛継勇); Lee, Yonghyeon (李鎔賢[이용현]); Wang, Haiyan (王海燕) (1 June 2011). 入唐僧慧萼の求法活動に関する基礎的研究 [A Basic Study of the Japanese Monk, Egaku in the Tang Dynasty] (PDF). KAKEN (in Japanese).
- Wang, Liansheng (王連胜) (2009). 普陀名山溯源 [The Origin of the Famous Putuoshan]. 佛教文化 (Buddhist Culture) (in Simplified Chinese) (3): 12–19.
- Wang, Liansheng (王連胜) (2009). 普陀山寺院通览 [An Overview of the Temples in Putuoshan]. 佛教文化 (Buddhist Culture) (in Simplified Chinese) (3): 50–67.
- Yü, Chün-Fang (2000). "P'u Tuo Shan". Kuan-yin, The Chinese Transformation of Avalokiteśvara. Columbia University Press. pp. 353–406. ISBN 9780231120296.
