= Shunsuke Takasugi =

Japanese former actor and singer (born 1949)

- 高杉 俊介
- Born: Naoki Iwata; 22 July 1949 (age 77); Ichinomiya, Aichi Prefecture, Japan
- Occupations: Actor; singer
- Years active: 1978–2017
- Notable work: Never Give Up (1978); Kike, wadatsumi no Koe (1995); Gamera 2: Attack of Legion (1996); Gamera 3: The Revenge of Iris (1999)
- Television: Kamen Rider Super-1; Hissatsu Watashi Hito
- Awards: Gold Disc and Hit Award; 17th Yokohama Music Festival Newcomer Award
- Website: http://www.takasugi-shunsuke.net/

Shunsuke Takasugi (高杉 俊介, 高杉 俊价, Takasugi Shunsuke; born Naoki Iwata (岩田 直樹, Iwata Naoki); 22 July 1949) is a Japanese former actor, singer, best known for playing Kazuya Oki in the television series Kamen Rider Super-1.

He was relatively old at playing a lead on the show at 30 years old, and also sang the popular theme tune.

He was reported to have borrowed ¥50 million (about US$ 320.000) from fans and others in the industry between 2003 and 2012 to help pay off living expenses after ending up in severe debt in his later years. This was first reported by Weekly Post (週刊ポス) in February 2015. In April and May 2016, he promised to repay when confronted at his home and on the TV show "Tokudane!" after twice not attending court. He refused to return the money in spite of attempts to sue him. Since 2017 in the midst of the ongoing court case Takasugi has disappeared and has not been seen since.

== Personal life ==
During his career with Kamen Rider Super-1, his young age was reported in various media at the time, but in an interview he recently announced his actual age. He was in the Self-Defense Forces of Japan before joining Kamen Rider and knew karate.

== Filmography ==
=== Television ===
Title	Episode	Years	Role	Network	Notes
Taiga drama / Ōgon no Hibi		1978		NHK	
Ginga TV Shōsetsu / Glass no Onna		1978		NHK	
Yabure Shinkurō		1978		EX	
Dai Tokai Part III	Episode 8 "Yajū no Hanran"	1978		NTV	Ranger guidance
Dai Tokai Part III	Episode 22 "Yokosuka Story"	1979		NTV	
Ōedo Sōsamō	Episode 412 "Shima Kaeri no Chichi Namida no Zesshō"	1979		TX	
Kakekomi Biru 7-gōshitsu	Episode 2 "Honmono Nisemono?! Kaettekita Jōhatsu Teishu"	1979		CX	
Kamen Rider Super-1		1980–81	Kazuya Oki / Kamen Rider Super-1	MBS	Lead role
Hissatsu Watashi Hito	Episodes 1-7	1983	Ginhei	ABC	Regular
Birth of the 10th! Kamen Riders All Together!!		1984	Kazuya Oki / Kamen Rider Super-1	MBS	
Kayō Suspense Gekijō / Chocolate Game		1986		NTV	
Shōjo Commando Izumi	Episode 2 "Sentō Nōryoku, Zenkai"	1987		CX	
Kinyō Onna no Drama Special / Anata no Otto, Koroshimasu		1987		CX	
Tokusou Robo Janperson	Episode 9 "Papa wa Kaibutsu da!"	1993	Kazuo Hayami	EX	
Mainichi Broadcasting System Kaikyoku 45 Shūnenkinen Bangumi / Sakurachiru-bi ni		1995		MBS	Military guidance
Hiroshima		1996		NHK	Japan-India joint military guidance
Kayō Suspense Gekijō / Keishichō Kanshikihan 2		1996	Detective	NTV	
Kinyō Entertainment / Fūsō Renpō		1996		CX	
Dainikai Endai Kokusai Dō Mansetsu		2008		Yantai, Shandong Province, China	Guest appearance
Kagayake! Eikō no Superhero Dōsōkai		2009		Family Gekijo	
Crayon Shin-chan		2011	Maruda (teacher)	EX	Guest appearance
Wahaha Honpo: Zentai Kōen Last: Tokyo Kōen		2013		Wowow Prime	Guest appearance
Torihada (Hi) Scoop Eizō 100-ka Jiten Shinshun Special		2014		EX	Interview appearance

=== Films ===
Title	Year	Role	Distributor	Notes
Never Give Up	1978		Nippon Herald Eiga = Toei Company	SDF Ranger Guidance and Stunts
Kamen Rider Super-1	1981	Kazuya Oki / Kamen Rider Super-1	Toei Company	Lead role
Passenger: Sugisarishi Hibi	1987	Journalist	Toei Company	
Kike, wadatsumi no Koe	1995	First Mizushima soldier	Toei Company	Concurrent military guidance
Minami no Shima ni Yuki ga Furu	1995	Military police	Reverse	Concurrent military guidance
Gamera 2: Attack of Legion	1996	Self-propelled grenade cannon	Toho	
Gamera 3: The Revenge of Iris	1999	Senior Prime Captain	Toho	

=== Direct-to-video ===
Title	Year	Role	Publisher	Notes
Crazy Rally in Japan	1982		Nihon Video Eizō	
Otokogumi Endless Trip	1989	Evil spirit	BMG Japan	Concurrent director
Ji-Go-Ro 2	1995		Seiyo	
Honkon Kuro Shakai: Kenka-gumi	1999		KSS	

=== Stage ===
Title	Year	Role	Production
Sentarō Koi shigure	1989	Hatamoto, Hikoshiro	Shin Kabukiza
Bakumatsu no Asashin	1997	Sakamoto Ryōma	Lost Kids

=== Radio ===
Title	Year	Network	Notes
All Night Nihon Tokuban		NBS	
Yume Yume Onrakukan	1990	Radio Nippon	1 year personality
Seishun Radimania		Radio Kansai	

=== Video games ===
Title	Year	Role	Publisher
Crayon Shin-chan: Uchū De Achō!? Yūjō no o Baka Rate!!	2011	Teacher	Bandai Namco Entertainment

=== Advertisements ===
Product	Advert
Kamen Rider Super-1 Henshin Belt	Poppy
Madras	
Onward	Poster Young Madras
Heian Kaku	France
Goto Construction	Access 21
Family Gekijo	Kokyū-hō
Family Gekijo	Transform

== Discography ==
=== Singles ===
Title	C/W	Year	Label	Notes
Kamen Rider Super-1	Hi o Hake Rider Ken	1980	Nippon Columbia	Golden Disc Award Golden Hit Award
Hidaka Ji no Tabi	Denao sanai ka		Teichiku Records	
Dragons Kōshinkyoku	Futari no Dragons	1987	Polydor Records	
Kimi kosowa ga Inochi	Suki-sa Yokohama	1990	Sony Music Entertainment Japan	Received the 17th Yokohama Music Festival New Recipe Award

=== Albums ===
Title	Year	Label	Notes
Kamen Rider Super-1	1981	Nippon Columbia	
Kamen Rider Super-1/Kamen Rider Complete Song Collection Series 7	1992	Nippon Columbia	
Otoko no oman Kayō Daizenshū	1995	Sony Music Entertainment Japan	Recorded "Kimi kosowa ga Inochi"
Eien no Hit Kayō Meikyoku-sen	2000	Sony Music Entertainment Japan	Recorded "Kimi kosowa ga Inochi"
Kamen Rider III Ongaku-shū	2004	Nippon Columbia	
Complete Song Collection Of 20th Century Masked Rider Series 07	2011	Nippon Columbia	"Kamen Rider Super-1 (2011 ver)" and 2 other songs, new recordings
