= Kamen Rider Super-1 =

- Genre: Tokusatsu; Superhero fiction Science fiction Action/Adventure; Fantasy
- Created by: Shotaro Ishinomori
- Developed by: Takashi Ezure
- Written by: Takashi Ezure; Tsutomu Tsukushi; Kyoko Kigiyama; Setsu Kumagai; Masaru Igami; Sukehiro Tomita; Kosuke Yoshida
- Directed by: Minoru Yamada; Shigeho Hirota; Takaharu Saeki; Michio Konishi; Hideo Tanaka; Atsuo Okunaka; Yoshiharu Tomita
- Starring: Shunsuke Takasugi; Nobuo Tsukamoto; Teru Sato; Yumiko Tanaka; Katsuya Hayakawa; Rieko Nagatsuka; Akira Shioji; Toshihiko Miki; Kentaro Kachi; Yuki Yoshizawa; Hiroo Kawarazaki; Kazuo Suzuki; Yōko Tōdō
- Composer: Shunsuke Kikuchi
- Country of origin: Japan
- No. of episodes: 48

Production
- Producers: Toru Hirayama (Toei); Masashi Abe (Toei)
- Running time: 20–25 minutes
- Production companies: Ishimori Productions; Toei Company; Mainichi Broadcasting System

Original release
- Network: JNN (MBS)
- Release: October 17, 1980 – October 3, 1981

Related
- Skyrider; Kamen Rider Black

Kamen Rider Super-1 (仮面ライダースーパー１, Kamen Raidā Sūpā Wan) is a Japanese tokusatsu superhero television series. It is the seventh installment in the Kamen Rider Series. The series was broadcast on the Mainichi Broadcasting System from October 17, 1980, to October 3, 1981. The series production of Toei, and was created by Shōtarō Ishinomori.

== Story ==
Kazuya Oki volunteers to undergo cybernetic surgery in the International Space Development Program in the United States to become an astronaut who can survive in outer space without the need for a bulky external suit. After a successful operation, he is given the codename "Super-1". Before he can depart for space, however, the base where he received his operation is attacked by the Dogma Kingdom. Only Kazuya can escape and is determined to avenge the deaths of the scientists, he returns to Japan and is trained by a martial arts expert, Master Genkai. With this knowledge, he can transform into the powerful Kamen Rider Super-1 to fight the evil Dogma Kingdom and later Jin Dogma.

== Cast and characters ==
- Shunsuke Takasugi as Kazuya Oki (沖一也, Oki Kazuya)/Kamen Rider Super-1
- Nobuo Tsukamoto as Genjirō Tani (谷源次郎, Tani Genjirō)
- Teru Satō (Played as Teruaki Satō (佐藤 輝昭, Satō Teruaki)) as Masao Kozuka (Choro) (小塚 政夫（チョロ）, Kozuka Masao (Choro))
- Yumiko Tanaka as Harumi Kusanami (草波 ハルミ, Kusanami Harumi)
- Katsuya Hayakawa as Ryō Kusanami (草波 良, Kusanami Ryō)
- Munemaru Kōda as Master Genkai (玄海老師, Genkai Rōshi): Kazuya's master and practitioner of the Sekishin Shaolin Fist martial arts.
- Kenji Nishiyama as Benkei (弁慶, Benkei)
- Rieko Nagatsuka as Masako Mizunuma (水沼 マサコ, Mizunuma Masako)
- Kazunori Tanaka as Daisuke Akita (秋田 大助, Akita Daisuke)
- Tadaomi Watanabe as Shigeru Matsuoka (松岡 シゲル, Matsuoka Shigeru)
- Ayumu Iwaki as Mamoru Murayama (村山 マモル, Murayama Mamoru)
- Moriyuki Ogidō as Takeshi Tanaka (田中 タケシ, Tanaka Takeshi)
- Izumi Nakamura as Michiru Ishikawa (石川 ミチル, Ishikawa Michiru)
- Hitoshi Hagiwara as Masaru Ishikawa (石川 マサル, Ishikawa Masaru)
- Ulf Ōtsuki as Professor Henry (ヘンリー博士, Henrī Hakase)
- Shinji Nakae as Narrator

=== Dogma Kingdom ===
The Dogma Kingdom (ドグマ王国, Doguma Ōkoku) is a secret extremist organization originating from Dark-Nebula B-26 who are seeking to kill Super-1 and rule the earth with their cyborgs, purging all those deemed unworthy of the utopia.

- Akira Shioji as Emperor Terror Macro/Kaiser Crow (帝王テラーマクロ／カイザーグロウ, Teiō Terā Makuro/Kaizā Gurō): The leader of the Dogma Kingdom, an ancient-looking man who surrounds himself with bodyguards. The bells that hang down under his throne ring to announce his arrival, and also serve as a means of discipline. After General Megirl's failure to destroy Super-1, he transforms into Kaiser Crow to fight him personally and is destroyed by Super-1's Super Rider Moon Surface Kick.
- Toshihiko Miki as General Megirl/Death Buffalo (メガール将軍／死神バッファロー, Megāru Shōgun/Shinigami Baffarō): The Dogma Kingdom's only eminent chief, he was a human named Masato Okuzawa (奥沢 正人, Okuzawa Masato) until an event five years prior resulted in his joining Dogma. He rides the horse Baraga (バラガ, Baraga) and is a master of the sword. After all of his subordinates are killed, he transforms into Death Buffalo to fight Kamen Rider Super-1 and is destroyed by Super-1's Super Rider Spark Kick.
- Dogma Bodyguards (ドグマボディーガード, Doguma Bodigādo): As their name states, they won't let anyone get too close to Terror Macro. They are higher ranks than General Megirl.
- Dogma Fighters (ドグマファイター, Doguma Faitā): The Dogma Kingdom's foot soldiers. Scientists wear white gowns.

=== Jin Dogma ===
After the destruction of the Dogma Kingdom, the Jin Dogma (ジンドグマ, Jin Doguma) organization appeared to take its place in terrorizing Japan.

- Kentarō Kachi as Marshal Demon/Satan Snake (悪魔元帥／サタンスネーク, Akuma Gensui/Satan Sunēku): The leader of the Jin Dogma, a coldhearted cyborg fighter who praises the glory of cybernetics. After his servants were killed by Kamen Rider Super-1, he transformed into Satan Snake to fight Kamen Rider Super-1. He was destroyed by Super-1 with the Lightning Sword (稲妻電光剣, Inazuma Denkōken).
- Yuki Yoshizawa as Princess Yōkai/Satan Doll (妖怪王女／サタンドｰル, Yōkai Ōjo/Satan Dōru): Wearing a butterfly mask, she has no interest in Jin Dogma's affairs. She was destroyed by Super-1's Super Rider Horizon Kick.
- Hiroo Kawarazaki as Commander Onibi/Onibibinba (鬼火司令／オニビビンバ, Onibi Shirei/Onibibinba): A quick-tempered character. He was destroyed by Super-1's Super Rider Horizon Kick.
- Kazuo Suzuki as Doctor Ghost/Gold Ghost (幽霊博士／ゴールドゴースト, Yūrei Hakase/Gorudo Gōsuto): An unusual figure. He was destroyed by Super Rider's Sky Continual Kick.
- Yōko Tōdō as Staff Officer Witch/Majoringa (魔女参謀／マジョリンガ, Majo Sanbō/Majoringa): A voluptuous sorceress. Assuming the form of Majoringa, she was destroyed fighting Super-1 with the Lightning Sword while praising Jin Dogma with her last breath.
- Jin Fighters (ジンファイター, Jin Faitā): The Jin Dogma's foot soldiers who brainwashed and upgraded the Dogma Fighters of the Dogma Kingdom. Footsoldiers have a silver mask and silver lines, and bodyguards have a golden mask and golden lines.

== Episodes ==
| No. | Title | Original release date |
|---|---|---|
| 1 | "The Galactic Cyborg's Great Transformation"; Transliteration: "Wakusei Yō Kaizō Ningen no Dai Henshin" (Japanese: 惑星用改造人間の大変身) | October 17, 1980 |
| 2 | "The Time of Battle Has Come! The Technique is the Sincere Shaolin Fist"; Transliteration: "Tatakai no Toki Kitari! Waza wa Sekishin Shōrin Ken" (Japanese: 闘いの時来たり！技は赤心少林拳) | October 24, 1980 |
| 3 | "Go! The Ends of the Earth, Dogma's El Dorado"; Transliteration: "Ike! Chi no Hate Doguma no Ōgonkyō" (Japanese: 行け！地の果てドグマの黄金郷) | October 31, 1980 |
| 4 | "Run, Kazuya! Dogma's Wedding March of Death"; Transliteration: "Hashire Kazuya! Doguma Shi no Kekkon Kōshinkyoku" (Japanese: 走れ一也！ドグマ死の結婚行進曲) | November 7, 1980 |
| 5 | "Jump, Kazuya! The Demonic Machine Race"; Transliteration: "Tobe Kazuya! Akuma no Mashīn Rēsu" (Japanese: 跳べ一也！悪魔のマシーンレース) | November 14, 1980 |
| 6 | "Help, The Lovers of the Spider's Nest Mansion"; Transliteration: "Tasuketē Kumo no Su Yakata no Koibito-tachi" (Japanese: 助けて～ くもの巣館の恋人たち) | November 21, 1980 |
| 7 | "Dogma Equation, the Living Computer"; Transliteration: "Doguma Shiki Ikiteiru Konpyūtā" (Japanese: ドグマ式生きているコンピューター) | November 28, 1980 |
| 8 | "Fight, Kazuya! Dogma's Trial of Death"; Transliteration: "Tatakae Kazuya! Shi no Doguma Saiban" (Japanese: 闘え一也！死のドグマ裁判) | December 5, 1980 |
| 9 | "Seen!! The Secret of the Dogma Monster Remodeling Factory"; Transliteration: "Mita zo!! Doguma Kaijin Kaizō Kōjō no Himitsu" (Japanese: 見たぞ！！ドグマ怪人製造工場の秘密) | December 12, 1980 |
| 10 | "Danger!! The Demonic Christmas Present"; Transliteration: "Ayaushi!! Akuma no Kurisumasu Purezento" (Japanese: 危うし！！悪魔のクリスマスプレゼント) | December 19, 1980 |
| 11 | "SOS! Kazuya! Cooperate with Dogma!!"; Transliteration: "Esu Ō Esu! Kazuya yo Doguma ni Kyōryoku seyo!!" (Japanese: ＳＯＳ！一也よドグマに協力せよ！！) | December 26, 1980 |
| 12 | "A Formidable Enemy Appears! The Sincere Shaolin Fist is Defeated"; Transliteration: "Kyōteki Arawaru! Sekishin Shōrin Ken Yaburetari" (Japanese: 強敵あらわる！赤心少林拳敗れたり) | January 9, 1981 |
| 13 | "Discovered! The Deadly "Plum-blossom" Technique"; Transliteration: "Mitsuketari! Hissatsu "Baika" no Waza" (Japanese: 見つけたり！必殺”梅花”の技) | January 16, 1981 |
| 14 | "Dogma Annihilated? The Demon Doctor's Laughing Gas"; Transliteration: "Doguma Zenmetsu? Akuma Hakase no Warai Gasu" (Japanese: ドグマ全滅？悪魔博士の笑いガス) | January 23, 1981 |
| 15 | "Genius Monster vs. Rider in a Contest of Wits"; Transliteration: "Tensai Kaijin Tai Raidā no Chie Kurabe" (Japanese: 天才怪人対ライダーの知恵くらべ) | January 30, 1981 |
| 16 | "Help! The One-Eyed Monster Comes to Attack!"; Transliteration: "Tasukete! Hitotsume Kaijin ga Osottekuru yo" (Japanese: 助けて！一つ目怪人が襲ってくるよ) | February 6, 1981 |
| 17 | "I Want Kazuya's Blood! The Strange Sword Calls"; Transliteration: "Kazuya no Chi ga Hoshii! Fushigi na Ken ga Yobu" (Japanese: 一也の血が欲しい！不思議な剣が呼ぶ) | February 13, 1981 |
| 18 | "Five-Hand Change Impossible!!"; Transliteration: "Faibu Hando Chenji Funō!!" (Japanese: ファイブ・ハンドチェンジ不能！！) | February 20, 1981 |
| 19 | "The Demonic Tutoring School!! The Dreadful Radio-Cassette Monster"; Transliteration: "Akuma no Gakushūjuku!! Kyōfu no Rajikase Kaijin" (Japanese: 悪魔の学習塾！！恐怖のラジカセ怪人) | February 27, 1981 |
| 20 | "In Your House! Dogma's Phone Rings Tonight"; Transliteration: "Kimi no Ie ni! Doguma no Denwa ga Konya Naru" (Japanese: 君の家に！ドグマの電話が今夜鳴る) | March 6, 1981 |
| 21 | "Emergency Order! Steal the Five Hands!!"; Transliteration: "Kinkyū Shirei! Faibu Hando o Ubae!!" (Japanese: 緊急指令！ファイブ・ハンドを奪え！！) | March 13, 1981 |
| 22 | "Duel at the Monster Graveyard! The End of General Megirl"; Transliteration: "Kaijin Hakaba no Kettō! Megāru Shōgun no Saigo" (Japanese: 怪人墓場の決闘！メガール将軍の最期) | March 20, 1981 |
| 23 | "Immortal Emperor Terror Macro's True Identity?"; Transliteration: "Fujimi no Teiō Terā Makuro no Shōtai wa?" (Japanese: 不死身の帝王テラーマクロの正体は？) | March 27, 1981 |
| 24 | "Let's Go!! Junior Rider Squad"; Transliteration: "Rettsu Gō!! Junia Raidā Tai" (Japanese: レッツゴー！！ジュニア・ライダー隊) | April 18, 1981 |
| 25 | "It Even Attacks Airplanes!! The Strong Magnet Monster"; Transliteration: "Hikōki mo Suiyoseru!! Kyōryoku Jishaku Kaijin" (Japanese: 飛行機も吸いよせる！！強力磁石怪人) | April 25, 1981 |
| 26 | "In the Care of a Clock? Jin Dogma's Trap"; Transliteration: "Tokei ni Goyōjin? Jindoguma no Wana!!" (Japanese: 時計にご用心？ジンドグマの罠！！) | May 2, 1981 |
| 27 | "A Friend of Children! Child X's Identity?"; Transliteration: "Kodomo no Mikata! Chairudo Ekkusu no Shōtai wa?" (Japanese: 子供の味方！チャイルドＸの正体は？) | May 9, 1981 |
| 28 | "The Bizarre Video Monster Who Makes Copies of People"; Transliteration: "Ningen o Utsushitoru Kaiki Bideo Kaijin" (Japanese: 人間を写しとる怪奇ビデオ怪人) | May 16, 1981 |
| 29 | "Rain, Rain, Fall, Fall! The Bizarre Umbrella Man!!"; Transliteration: "Ame Ame Fure Fure! Kaiki Kasa Otoko!!" (Japanese: 雨あめ降れふれ！怪奇傘男！！) | May 23, 1981 |
| 30 | "The Evil Super Express! Rollerskate Monster"; Transliteration: "Aku no Chō Tokkyū! Rōrāsukēto Kaijin" (Japanese: 悪の超特急！ローラースケート怪人) | May 30, 1981 |
| 31 | "It Sucks up Humans! The Terrifying Spray Monster"; Transliteration: "Ningen o Suikomu! Supurē Kaijin no Kyōfu" (Japanese: 人間を吸いこむ！スプレー怪人の恐怖) | June 6, 1981 |
| 32 | "Bait the Rider! Fishing Rod Monster Appears"; Transliteration: "Raidā o Esa ni Shiro! Tsurizao Kaijin Shutsugen" (Japanese: ライダーを餌にしろ！釣り竿怪人出現) | June 13, 1981 |
| 33 | "Let's Fight, Everyone! The Dreadful RC Monster"; Transliteration: "Minna de Tatakaō! Kyōfu no Rajikon Kaijin" (Japanese: みんなで闘おう！恐怖のラジコン怪人) | June 20, 1981 |
| 34 | "The Magic Red Light That Masaru Found"; Transliteration: "Masaru ga Hirotta Mahō no Aka Ranpu" (Japanese: マサルがひろった魔法の赤ランプ) | June 27, 1981 |
| 35 | "The Bizarre Chair Human! The Execution Room!"; Transliteration: "Kaiki Isu Ningen! Shokei no Heya!" (Japanese: 怪奇イス人間！処刑の部屋！) | July 4, 1981 |
| 36 | "Scissors Monster's Snip-snap Operation!!"; Transliteration: "Hasami Kaijin no Chokinchokin Sakusen!!" (Japanese: ハサミ怪人のチョキンチョキン作戦！！) | July 11, 1981 |
| 37 | "Big Arm Top Monster! Deathmatch at the Lighthouse!!"; Transliteration: "Kyowan Koma Kaijin! Tōdai no Shitō!!" (Japanese: 巨腕コマ怪人！灯台の死闘！！) | July 18, 1981 |
| 38 | "Dangerous! Don't Go Inside the Refrigerator Monster!!"; Transliteration: "Abunai! Reizōko Kaijin no Naka ni Hairu na!!" (Japanese: 危い！冷蔵庫怪人の中に入るな！！) | July 25, 1981 |
| 39 | "Where is the Powerful Lighter Monster's Weak Point!!"; Transliteration: "Kyōryoku Raitā Kaijin no Jakuten wa Doko da!!" (Japanese: 強力ライター怪人の弱点はどこだ！！) | August 1, 1981 |
| 40 | "Oh, Humans are Melting! Soap Monster Appears"; Transliteration: "Ā Ningen ga Tokeru! Sekken Kaijin Shutsugen" (Japanese: あっ人間が溶ける！石けん怪人出現) | August 8, 1981 |
| 41 | "Kazuya in the Zoo, Escape from the Underwater Cage Impossible?"; Transliteration: "Dōbutsuen no Kazuya, Suichū Ori Kara Dasshutsu Funō?" (Japanese: 動物園の一也、水中檻から脱出不能？) | August 15, 1981 |
| 42 | "Marshal Demon's Great Costume Party"; Transliteration: "Akuma Gensui no Dai Kasō Pātī" (Japanese: 悪魔元帥の大仮装パーティー) | August 22, 1981 |
| 43 | "The World is Freezing!? Electric Fan Monster's Might!"; Transliteration: "Sekai ga Kōru!? Senpūki Kaijin no Iryoku!" (Japanese: 世界が凍る！？扇風機怪人の威力！) | August 29, 1981 |
| 44 | "Lengthening Ladder Monster's Evil Influence"; Transliteration: "Nyokinyoki Nobiru Hashigo Kaijin no Mashu" (Japanese: ニョキ・ニョキのびるハシゴ怪人の魔手) | September 5, 1981 |
| 45 | "The Most Excellent Monster You Thought Up, ShokaKing"; Transliteration: "Kimi no Kangaeta Saiyūshū Kaijin Shōkakingu" (Japanese: 君の考えた最優秀怪人ショオカキング) | September 12, 1981 |
| 46 | "Marshal Demon Enraged! Transform, Onibi! Princess!!"; Transliteration: "Akuma Gensui Ikaru! Henshin seyo Onibi! Ōjo!!" (Japanese: 悪魔元帥怒る！変身せよ鬼火！王女！！) | September 19, 1981 |
| 47 | "Golden Rain! Doctor Ghost's Final Trap!!"; Transliteration: "Ōgon no Ame! Yūrei Hakase Saigo no Wana!!" (Japanese: 黄金の雨！幽霊博士最後のワナ！！) | September 26, 1981 |
| 48 | "Farewell, Earth! Kazuya Heads Off to Space!!"; Transliteration: "Chikyū yo Saraba! Kazuya Uchū e no Tabidachi!!" (Japanese: 地球よさらば！一也宇宙への旅立ち！！) | October 3, 1981 |

== Film ==
Kamen Rider Super-1: The Movie The film was released on March 14, 1981, and was produced by Tōru Hirayama.

Plot

The Dogma Kingdom attacks the Matagi (mountain tribe) village of Yamabiko to steal the sacred Flying Dragon Fortress and wreak havoc all over Japan. Six children from the fallen village take refuge in a nearby town, keeping their identities as Matagi citizens a secret. Kamen Rider Super-1 must protect these kids from the Dogma Kingdom, as they hold the secret to the Flying Dragon Fortress' weakness.

Cast

- Shunsuke Takasugi as Kamen Rider Super-1
- Nobuo Tsukamoto as Jiro Tanihara
- Hiroshi Miyauchi as Shiro Kazami / Kamen Rider V3 (Voice)

== Songs ==
Opening theme

- "Kamen Rider Super-1" (仮面ライダースーパー1, Kamen Raidā Sūpā Wan)
  - Lyrics: Shotaro Ishinomori
  - Composition: Shunsuke Kikuchi
  - Artist: Shunsuke Takasugi with Kōrogi '73

Ending themes

- "Hi o Fuke Rider Ken" (火を噴けライダー拳, Hi o Fuke Raidā Ken; "The Fiery Rider Fist")
  - Lyrics: Saburō Yatsude
  - Composition: Shunsuke Kikuchi
  - Artist: Shunsuke Takasugi with Korōgi '73
  - Episodes: 1–23
- "Junior Rider Tai no Uta" (ジュニアライダー隊の歌, Junia Raidā Tai no Uta; "The Song of the Junior Rider Team")
  - Lyrics: Kei Akai
  - Composition: Shunsuke Kikuchi
  - Artist: Ichirou Mizuki with the Columbia Yurikago-kai and Kōrogi '73
  - Episodes: 24–48

== International broadcasts ==
- In the Philippines, it was aired on RPN-9 as Masked Rider Super One from 1983 to 1984 with an English dub.
- Super-1 aired in Indonesia in 1995 via RCTI. In this version, the opening and ending songs were changed into two other ones (not a dubbed soundtrack). First, Super One for the opening theme and Kuserahkan for the ending song.
