= Gikū =

Heian period Japanese monk

Gikū (Note: Gikū (kanji: 義空) is the most popular name in usage in the Anglophone world. His native name however is Yikong (kanji: 义空).)
- 義空

Personal life
- Born: unknown China
- Died: unknown China
- Flourished: 9th Century CE
- Occupation: Buddhist monk, scholar

Religious life
- Religion: Buddhism
- School: Chan

Senior posting
- Teacher: Yanguan Qi’an

Chinese name
- Traditional Chinese: 義空
- Simplified Chinese: 义空
Transcriptions
Standard Mandarin
- Hanyu Pinyin: Yìkòng
- Wade–Giles: I^{4} k'ung^{4}

Vietnamese name
- Vietnamese: Nghĩa Không

Korean name
- Hangul: 의공
- Hanja: 義空
Transcriptions
- Revised Romanization: Uigong

Japanese name
- Hiragana: ぎくう

Gikū or Yikong was an early Heian period Buddhist monk from Tang China. He is Japan's first Buddhist monk who exclusively taught Zen.

== Legacy ==
There are many unknown facts about Gikū such as his birthplace, birth date and death date. However, he was an important disciple of Yanguan Qi'an, a renowned 9th generation Zen master descended from Mazu Daoyi. (Note: Foguangshan p 7472 宣宗敕諡「悟空大師」之號，並以御詩追悼。[Yanguan Qi'an died in 842 CE in his 90s before the ascension of Emperor Tang Xuānzong.] Emperor Xuānzong awards Yanguan Qi'an, the title "Wukong National Preceptor" and mourned him with imperial poetry. He was a distant member of the Tang royal family surnamed Li.)

During the Jowa period (834-848 CE), Empress Dowager Tachibana Kachiko dispatched Egaku on several trips to Tang China for pilgrimage and to invite a Zen monk back to Japan to propagate Zen Buddhism in Japan. In 841 CE, Egaku went on his first trip to Tang China. He went on a pilgrimage to Mount Wutai. Later he traveled to Hangzhou's Lingchi Monastery to meet Yanguan Qi'an. Egaku conveys Tachibana Kachiko's wishes to invite Yanguan Qi'an back to Japan to propagate Zen Buddhism. However, Yanguan Qi'an instead suggested Gikū as a replacement. On this trip, Egaku also took vows of providing support for the Sangha. This vow required him to return to Japan. Gikū did not return with Egaku on this trip.

Egaku returned to Tang China in 844 CE. Armed with religious offerings made by the Empress Dowager, he went again on pilgrimage to Mount Wutai. Later he went to Lingchi Monastery to honor Yanguan Qi'an. However, Yanguan Qi'an had already died two years earlier. Gikū agrees to accompany Egaku back to Japan. However, in 845 CE, the Huichang Persecution intervenes and reaches its zenith and Egaku had to pretend to return to secular life. The Huichang Persecution ends when Emperor Xuanzong ascends the throne in 846 CE. Egaku then returns with Gikū to Japan in 847 CE. (Note: Foguangshan 7010 與道昉等東渡日本--Gikū was accompanied by Dōhō and others on his trip east to Japan.)

Aristocratic Heian society enthusiastically received Gikū's arrival in Japan as he was the first Zen monk from China who exclusively taught Zen Buddhism in Japan. (Note: Although Japan had earlier Zen masters who either came or returned to Japan, such as Dōshō and Dōsen, they also taught the teachings of other sects. As such, Gikū is the first exclusively Zen master from the Southern School to reside in the new capital of Heian-kyō.) (Note: Ōtsuki また橘嘉智子だけでなく皇帝（仁明天皇）や中散大夫藤公兄弟といった官僚の帰依も厚かったことが知られる。Records indicate that not only Tachibana Kachiko but the Emperor Ninmyō and the bureaucrat Chūsan Daifu Fujiwara brothers were sincere and also took refuge with Gikū.) Tachibana Kachiko first housed him in the western wing of Tō-ji Temple; then moved him to Danrin Temple once it became completed. (Note: Groner Danrin Temple was also a nunnery for nuns who observed the bhikkuni precepts. Tachibana Kachiko herself became a nun once her Emperor son Ninmyō became sick and lived at Danrin Temple until her death.) Gikū taught Zen Buddhism for several years there and then returned to Tang China. (Note: Ōtsuki さらに師蛮は，義空伝の賛において，義空渡来後「...，実悟せし者，橘后一人のみ，空公，時未だ熟せざるを知り，之を辞して帰唐す」と記し...Mangen Shiban (1626-1710), a Japanese Rinzai Zen scholar-monk who wrote two Buddhist histories the "Enpō Record of the Transmission of the Lamp" and the "Honchō Records of the High Priest" was a Rinzai sect monk who said in his praises of the Record of Gikū, after Gikū arrived in Japan, "...Tachibana Kachiko was the only person who truly understood [Zen]. Gikū thought the time was not ripe for Zen. Therefore, he resigned and then returned to Tang China..." Ōtsuki also suggests Gikū was disappointed with the upholding of monastic precepts in Japan cf. Enchin's Bussetsu Kanfugen Bosatsu Gyō Hōkyō, ...田中史生氏によると滞在期間は十年にも満たなかった可能性が高く，856（唐・大中10，日本・斉衡 3 ）年前後までの間と推定されている。According to Tanaka Fumio, it is very likely Gikū only stayed in Japan for less than ten years. He theorizes its highly likely that Gikū stayed only until sometime around 856 CE.) (Note: Hibino こ，に当時の禅の受容のあり方を知ることができる。…呪術的に受け入れられたのであった。斯様に歪曲されて受容された禅は、....禅そのものを理会することもできず――従って必要ともしない状態の中にあって、その後に継承・発展するべくもなかった... From this, we know Heian society accepted Zen in the form of mantra ceremonies. This type of convoluted acceptance made society unable to understand Zen itself, and since [the distinctive aspects unique to Zen] was unneeded then, [Zen] was unable to be passed down and develop.) (Note: Dōshō, Dōsen, Gikū and later Kakua attempted to introduce Zen into Japan. All failed in their attempts. It would take four hundred more years after Gikū before Zen firmly established itself in Japan in the 13th century. cf. Eisai, Dogen and Nanpo Shōmyō.)

After Gikū returns to Tang China, Egaku a few years later returns to Tang China. On this trip, Egaku had an "agate-colored stele" made on his behalf in Suzhou's Kaiyuan Monastery by the Chinese Zen monk Qieyuan, entitled "Record of the Nation of Japan’s First Zen School." (Note: Chen 慧萼还专门请苏州开元寺高僧契元制作了一块题为枟日本国首传禅宗记枠的玛瑙石碑立在罗城门侧 。Hui'E asked the senior monk of Suzhou's Kaiyuan Monastery Qieyuan, to compose an agate(-colored) stele entitled "Record of the Nation of Japan's First Zen School." The stele was later placed to the side of Heian-kyō's Rashōmon Gate.) This agate stele once stood in Heian-kyō's Rashōmon, and Tōdai-ji once preserved four large fragments of this stele. The significance of this agate stele is that it was one of the few contemporaneous records describing Egaku's recruitment of Gikū as the first Zen monk to Japan. It was one of the sources used by Kokan Shiren to write the Egaku article found in Japan's earliest Buddhist history, the Genkō Shakusho.

== Sources ==
- Chen, Chong (陈翀) (2010). 慧萼东传枟白氏文集枠及普陀洛迦开山考 [On the Spread of Baishi Wenji to Japan by Hui E and the First Temple on Putuo‐Luojia Mountain]. 浙江大学学报 (人文社会科学版) Journal of Zhejiang University (Humanities and Social Sciences Edition) (in Simplified Chinese). 40 (5): 44–54.
- Dōgen (2010). Dōgen's Extensive Record : A Translation of the Eihei Kōroku. Translated by Leighton, Taigen Dan; Okumura, Shōhaku. Boston: Wisdom Publications. ISBN 978-0861716708.
- Foguangshan Foundation for Buddhist Culture and Education (佛光山文教基金會) (1989). 齊安 [Qi'an]. 佛光山大詞典 (Foguangshan Dictionary of Buddhism) (in Traditional Chinese). p. 7472. ISBN 9789574571956.
- Foguangshan Foundation for Buddhist Culture and Education (佛光山文教基金會) (1989). 義空 [Yikong]. 佛光山大詞典 (Foguangshan Dictionary of Buddhism) (in Traditional Chinese). p. 7010. ISBN 9789574571956.
- Groner, Paul (1997). Ryogen and Mount Hiei: Japanese Tendai in the Tenth Century. University of Hawaii Press. ISBN 9780824822606.
- Hibino, Kō (日比野晃) (1972). 禅の受容についての一考察―橘嘉智子と栄西の場合 [The Receptiveness of Zen in Japan-The Case Study on Tachibana Kachiko and Eisai]. 中日本自動車短期大学論叢 (in Japanese) (3–4): 107–114.
- Ōtsuki, Yōko (大槻暢子) (2008). 唐僧義空についての初歩的考察――唐商徐公祐から義空への書簡―― [Rudimentary Studies of Tang Priest Gikū: The Letters Addressed to Tang Priest Gikū from a Tang Merchant Jokoyu]. 東アジア文化交渉研究 (in Japanese). 1: 129–140.
- Tanaka, Fumio (田中史生); Ge, Jiyong (葛継勇); Lee, Yonghyeon (李鎔賢[이용현]); Wang, Haiyan (王海燕) (1 June 2011). 入唐僧慧萼の求法活動に関する基礎的研究 [A Basic Study of the Japanese Monk, Egaku in the Tang Dynasty] (PDF). KAKEN (in Japanese).
