= Ryoko Nakano =

Japanese actress

Ryoko Nakano (中野 良子, Nakano Ryōko, born 6 May 1950) is a Japanese actress.

== Filmography ==
=== Film ===
- Manhunt (1976)
- Never Give Up (1978)
- Avalokitesvara (2013)
- Yanagawa (2021)

=== Television ===
- Akai Meiro (1974–75)
