= Tenryūji-bune =

Two Japanese–Yuan trade ships

The Tenryūji-bune (天竜寺船) were two Japanese–Yuan trade ships launched in 1342 in order to procure funds for the construction of Tenryū-ji. They were approved by the Muromachi shogunate, and released to the command of a Hakata merchant named Shihon (至本) under the condition that he donate 5,000 kanmon (equivalent to 5,000,000 mon) to the temple irrespective of the mission's commercial success.
