= Avalokitesvara (film) =

- Poster
- 不肯去观音
- Directed by: Zhang Xin
- Written by: Sun Zuping; Zhou Kailong; Tao Qianni
- Produced by: Xu Jian
- Starring: Li Chun; Nie Yuan; Nakaizumi Hideo; Siqin Gaowa; Nakano Ryoko; Mou Fengbin
- Cinematography: Chen Xinning; Jiang Xiaohui; Liu Huayi
- Edited by: Zhou Ying
- Music by: Wu Xuan
- Production companies: Beijing Spencer Culture & Media
- Distributed by: China Film Group Corporation
- Release date: 26 July 2013
- Running time: 117 minutes
- Country: China
- Languages: Mandarin; Japanese

Avalokitesvara (不肯去观音; Guanyin who refuses to leave) is a 2013 Chinese religious film directed by Zhang Xin. It is loosely based on a legend about how Mount Putuo in China's Zhejiang Province became the bodhimaṇḍa of the bodhisattva Avalokiteśvara, who is better known in Chinese as Guanyin. The film starred Li Chun, Nie Yuan, Nakaizumi Hideo, Siqin Gaowa, Nakano Ryoko and Mou Fengbin in the leading roles. It was shown at the 37th Montreal World Film Festival in 2013 and was named one of the four World Greats.

== Synopsis ==
The film is set in ninth-century China during the reign of Emperor Wuzong of the Tang dynasty. Prince Guang, a relative of the emperor, has been sickly since childhood. His mother Lady Zheng commissions the craftsman Yu Xiufeng to create a porcelain figurine of Guanyin so she can pray to the bodhisattva to bless her son. On the day the figurine is completed, Yu Xiufeng and his grandson Haisheng discover a baby girl in a lotus pond. Yu Xiufeng adopts the baby girl as his granddaughter and names her Lianmei. The figurine is taken to Mount Wutai and enshrined in a temple.

Years later, Emperor Wuzong orders the persecution of Buddhism and perceives Prince Guang as a threat, so he sends General Yuchi to assassinate the prince. At the same time, Yu Xiufeng goes to Mount Wutai to collect the figurine and hide it at Mount Meicen.

During the journey, Yu Xiufeng and his grandchildren meet Egaku, a Japanese monk sent by Empress Tachibana to borrow the figurine and bring it to Japan. General Yuchi's deputy, General Sima, has been secretly tasked to protect Prince Guang, so he saves the prince when Yuchi is about to kill him. Sima defeats Yuchi and is about to kill him, but Lianmei asks him to spare Yuchi. Prince Guang and Sima then accompany Yu Xiufeng and his grandchildren as they bring the figurine to Mount Meicen. Egaku also makes his way there.

Yuchi tracks down Prince Guang with the help of the governor of Mingzhou. Lianmei and Haisheng disguise themselves as Prince Guang and Sima to lure Yuchi to chase them, while Prince Guang and Sima seize the opportunity to escape. Yu Xiufeng stays behind to distract the governor, who kills him. Yuchi realises that he has been tricked, so he stops chasing Lianmei and Haisheng. In the meantime, Egaku steals the figurine and tries to sneak away.

When Haisheng and Lianmei return home, they are horrified to see their grandfather dead. Haisheng sees Egaku fleeing and thinks he is the killer, so he chases Egaku and starts beating him. Lianmei stops Haisheng, saying she believes Egaku when he claims he did not kill their grandfather. However, she refuses to let Egaku take the figurine. Egaku feels so ashamed that he gives up and returns to Japan.

Lianmei and Haisheng are later captured in Mingzhou. Haisheng escapes from prison and drags Lianmei along. Upon learning of their escape, Yuchi orders the other prisoners to be executed. However, Lianmei and Haisheng return to stop Yuchi, who is so impressed by their act of self-sacrifice that he spares the prisoners.

Yuchi sets a trap to lure Prince Guang out of hiding, announcing that Lianmei and Haisheng will be executed for helping a fugitive escape. As he expected, Prince Guang and Sima show up to save them. Just then, news arrives that Emperor Wuzong is dead and Prince Guang is now the emperor. Yuchi commits suicide; Lianmei and Haisheng take the figurine back to Mount Wutai.

Egaku comes to China again later to borrow the figurine. Although his request is initially turned down, he ultimately moves everyone with his sincerity. En route to Japan, the figurine is lost at sea during a storm. Egaku has a vision of Lianmei as Guanyin on Mount Meicen, and realises the figurine is destined to remain in China. However, he can bring the virtues embodied by the bodhisattva – compassion and mercy – back to Japan and impart them to his people.

== Cast ==
- Li Chun as Lianmei
- Nie Yuan as Li Yi (Prince Guang)
- Nakaizumi Hideo as Egaku
- Siqin Gaowa as Lady Zheng
- Nakano Ryoko as Empress Tachibana
- Mou Fengbin as General Yuchi
- Wang Zengqi as Haisheng
- Niu Ben as Yu Xiufeng
- Sang Weilin as General Sima
- Kuroki Shinji as Aoki
- Fang Xinmin as Reverend Wuchen
- Zhang Shengbao as Governor Song
- Ying Lizhi as Eunuch Ma
- Wang Jianguo as a fisherman

== Production ==
Avalokitesvara was approved by China's State Administration for Religious Affairs and State Administration of Press, Publication, Radio, Film and Television before it starting filming on 6 June 2012 at Mount Putuo, Zhejiang Province. It opened in Chinese theatres on 26 July 2013.

Venerable Master Yicheng, a former President of the Buddhist Association of China, served as principal consultant for the film.

== Awards ==
Avalokitesvara was shown at the 37th Montreal World Film Festival in 2013. It was named one of the World Greats along with Mitani Kōki's The Kiyosu Conference, Wang Jing's Fall of Ming, and Ren Pengyuan's The Deadly Bullet.
