= Li Chun (actress) =

Chinese actress (born 1988)

- 李纯
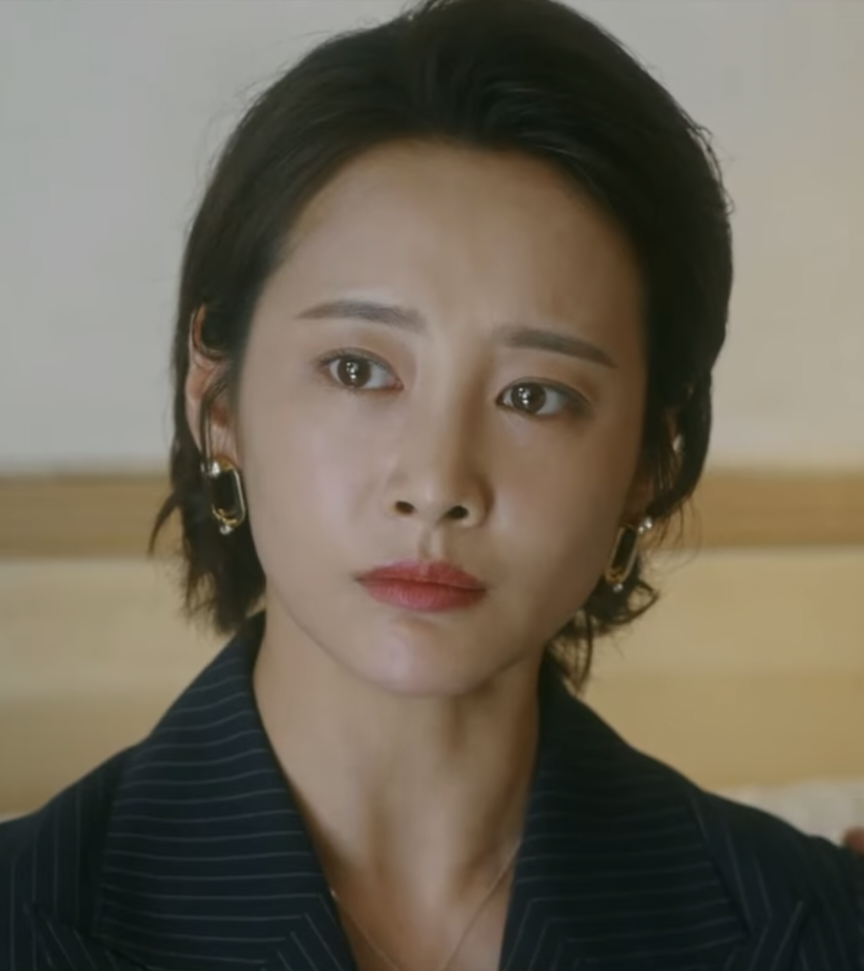
- Li in Love Yourself (2020)
- Born: February 15, 1988 (age 38); Wuhu, Anhui, China
- Other name: Frida Li
- Education: Beijing Film Academy
- Occupation: Actress
- Years active: 2010-present

Chinese name
- Traditional Chinese: 李純
- Simplified Chinese: 李纯
Transcriptions
Standard Mandarin
- Hanyu Pinyin: Lǐ Chún

Li Chun (Chinese: 李纯; born 15 February 1988) is a Chinese actress, best known for her roles in television series as Ni Mantian and Wei Yanwan in The Journey of Flower (2015) and Ruyi's Royal Love in the Palace (2018) respectively, and has received critical acclaim for her film work, particularly as Qinhuainü in The Flowers of War and Lian Mei in Avalokitesvara.

== Early life and education ==
Li Chun was born in Wuhu, Anhui, on February 15, 1988. She began to learn painting as a child. In 1998, at age 10, she was accepted to the Dance School Affiliated to Beijing Dance Academy and graduated in 2005. After graduation, she was hired to be a dancer at the Shanghai Ballet. In 2007 she performed in Butterfly Love in the United States. She entered Beijing Film Academy in 2009, majoring in acting, where she graduated in 2013. On October 2, 2025, Li Chun announced her marriage to singer Ma Di.

== Career ==
Li entered the entertainment circle in October 2010, while director Zhang Yimou attended the 60th anniversary school celebration of Beijing Film Academy and cast her in his film. Li made her film debut in The Flowers of War (2011), playing Qinhuainü.

In June 2012, she starred with Nakaizumi Hideo in the religious film Avalokitesvara, which was shown at the 37th Montreal World Film Festival in 2013.

Li had a supporting role as Su Qin in the family drama 80s Engagement (2013). She then played a supporting role in Zhang Yimou's film Coming Home.

In 2015, she had a key supporting role in the fantasy romance television series The Journey of Flower, based on the 2009 novel of the same name by Fresh Guoguo. The series was a huge commercial success in China, with an average rating of 2.784% (CMS50) and 2.213% (nationwide), becoming the second highest rated drama of 2015. It also became the first Chinese drama to surpass 20 billion online views. The same year, she co-starred with Taiwanese actor Benjamin H. Wang in the romantic comedy film Eternal Love.

In 2016, Li starred in the adventure suspense television series The Tibet Code. She also starred in the wuxia drama Huajinghu Buliangren based on the comic of the same name.

Li joined the main cast of crime suspense film Guilty of Mind (2017), based on the 2012 novel Picture of Psychological Crime by Lei Mi. The same year, Li played the concubine of Yang Yang's character in the fantasy romance film Once Upon a Time.

In 2018, Li starred in the palace scheming drama Ruyi's Royal Love in the Palace, portraying one of the main antagonists.

In 2019, Li starred in the military drama Paratrooper Spirit; and featured in the historical political drama Joy of Life.

In 2020, Li starred in the period drama New World. The same year she starred in the female centric drama Love Yourself.

She was cast in the wuxia drama Sword Snow Stride written by Wang Juan.

== Filmography ==
=== Film ===
Year	English title	Chinese title	Role	Notes
2011	The Flowers of War	金陵十三钗	Qinhuainü	
2013	Avalokitesvara	不肯去观音	Lian Mei	
2013	Rock Paper Scissors	剪刀石头布		
2014	Coming Home	归来	Cui Meifang	
2014	Liar's Confession	騙子的自白		
2017	Eternal Love	海角有个五店市	Chen Nan	
2017	Once Upon a Time	三生三世十里桃花	Su Jin	
2017	Guilty of Mind	心理罪	Chen Xi	

=== Television series ===
Year	English title	Chinese title	Role	Notes
2014	80s Engagement	大都市小爱情	Su Qin	
2015	Say No for Youth	天生要完美	Gao Ying	
2015	The Journey of Flower	花千骨	Ni Mantian	
2016	Hua Jing Hu: Bu Liang Ren	画江湖之不良人	Lu Linxuan	
2016	The Tibet Code	藏地密码	Tang Min	
2018	Ruyi's Royal Love in the Palace	如懿传	Wei Yanwan	
2019	Paratrooper Spirit	伞兵魂	Lin Junqiao	
2019	Joy of Life	庆余年	Si Lili	
2020	New World	新世界	Liu Rusi	
2020	Love Yourself	他其实没有那么爱你	Ren Liang	
2021	Delicious Romance	爱很美味	Liu Jing	
2021	Sword Snow Stride	雪中悍刀行	Xuanyuan Qingfeng	
TBA	Baimu Jonny	百慕迷踪	Hu Yue	

== Discography ==
Year	English title	Chinese title	Album	Notes
2020	"I Want Your Love"	我要你的爱	Love Yourself OST	

== Awards and nominations ==
Year	Event	Category	Nominated work	Result	Ref.
2019	iFeng Fashion Choice Awards	Fashion Attitude of the Year	—N/a	Won	
2020	26th Shanghai Television Festival	Best Supporting Actress	The New World	Nominated	
2020	7th The Actors of China Award Ceremony	Best Actress (Emerald)	—N/a	Pending	
