= Never Give Up (1978 film) =

1978 film by Junya Satō

- Theatrical release poster
- Directed by: Jun'ya Satō
- Screenplay by: Kōji Takada
- Based on: Proof of the Wild by Seiichi Morimura
- Produced by: Haruki Kadokawa; Sunao Sakagami; Simon Tse; Fumio Matsuda; Masanori Endo
- Starring: Ken Takakura; Hiroko Yakushimaru; Ryoko Nakano; Rentarō Mikuni; Hiroshi Tachi
- Narrated by: Kei Taguchi
- Cinematography: Shinsaku Himeda
- Edited by: Jun Nabeshima
- Music by: Yuji Ohno
- Production company: Kadokawa Pictures
- Distributed by: Toei Company
- Release date: October 7, 1978 (Japan)
- Running time: 143 minutes
- Country: Japan
- Language: Japanese

Never Give Up (Japanese: 野性の証明, Hepburn: Yasei no shōmei) is a 1978 Japanese thriller film, based on a novel by Seiichi Morimura. It was directed by Junya Sato and produced by Haruki Kadokawa. Toei Company released the film on October 7, 1978, in Japan.

== Plot ==
A girl survives a massacre of villagers by Japanese soldiers in a remote mountain village.

== Cast ==
- Ken Takakura as Takeshi Ajisawa
- Hiroko Yakushimaru as Yoriko Nagai
- Ryoko Nakano as Tomoko Ochi
- Rentarō Mikuni
- Hiroshi Tachi as Naruaki Oba
- Fumio Watanabe as Yoshida
- Taiji Tonoyama
- Takahiro Tamura as Takashi Urakawa, pressman
- Kazuo Kitamura as Nagakawa
- Hajime Hana as Muranaga
- Katsumasa Uchida
- Mizuho Suzuki as Kuga
- Hideji Otaki as Nomura
- Isao Natsuyagi as Kitano
- Richard Anderson as Roberts
- Shinsuke Ashida as Sakamoto
- Nobuo Kaneko as Mizoguchi
- Tatsuo Umemiya as Akio Izaki
- Mikio Narita as Tasuke Nakao
- Hiroki Matsukata as Minagawa
- Tetsuro Tamba as Wada
