= Danrin-ji =

Buddhist temple in Kyoto, Japan

Coordinates: 35°1′25.4″N 135°40′2.8″E

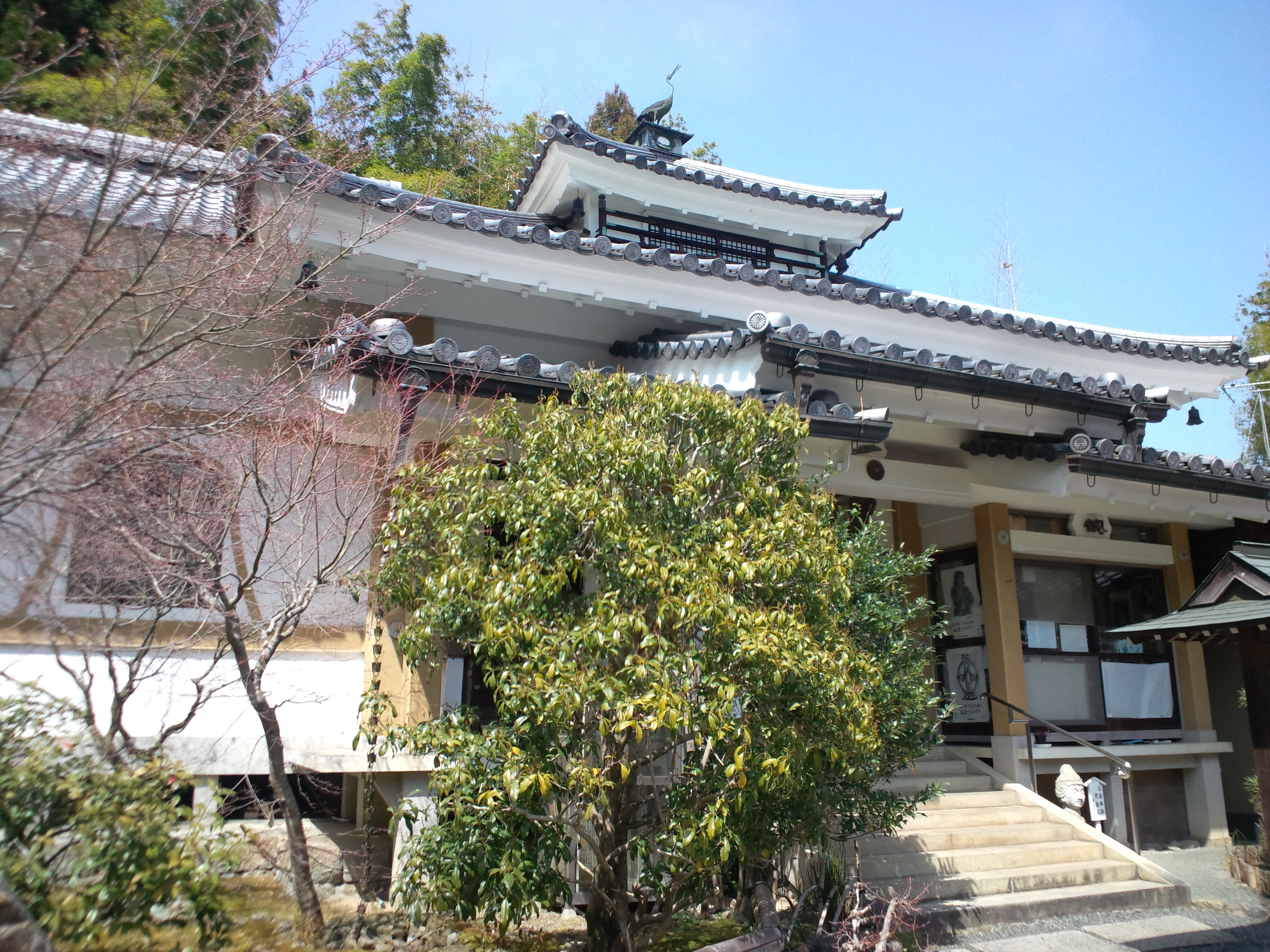
Danrin-ji Buddhist Temple - Main temple

Danrin-ji (檀林寺) was Japan's first Zen temple, founded in Saga, Kyōto, by order of Empress Danrin during the Jōwa era.

The temple began as a nunnery with a cluster of 12 sub-temple buildings in 836. Empress Danrin invited the monk Gikū to Danrin-ji and later took monastic vows there herself. The Chan Buddhist teachings of Gikū were not well received in Japan and he returned to China.

The temple was destroyed by fire in 928, but was restored in 1321, and during the Muromachi period the temple was designated as one of Kyōto's five great Buddhist nunneries. The temple eventually fell into disrepair, and in 1339 construction of Tenryū-ji began on its grounds.
