= Dao-xuan =

Chinese Monk

Dao-xuan (Chinese: 道璿; pinyin: Dào Xuán; Wade–Giles: Tao Hsüan, 702–760) or Dōsen in Japanese was a prominent Chinese monk in early Japanese Buddhism. He was responsible for importing Northern School Chan teachings, Huayan school teachings and the Bodhisattva Precepts to Japan in 736. He also served as the Risshi (律師; "precept master") for ordination prior to the arrival of Ganjin, and presided over the opening of the Tōdai-ji Temple.

Dao-xuan was born in Hunan Province in 702, and ordained at an early age in the Vinaya school in China (律宗) at Dafu (大福) temple in Loyang. After learning the Vinaya, he traveled and practiced Chan meditation for a time followed by intensive study of Tiantai doctrines before returning to his home temple where he hosted lectures.

In 733, two Japanese monks, Eiei (栄叡) and Fushō (普照) came to China in search of a Vinaya master who would accompany them to Japan to provide orthodox Buddhist ordinations there. Dao-xuan agreed to go, and arrived in 736. However, the rules of the Vinaya state that a minimum of 10 bhikkhu monks was required for new ordinations, and so Dao-xuan was unable to conduct an ordination service until 754 when Ganjin and his disciples arrived in Japan.

In the meantime, Dao-xuan had brought the latest Buddhist teachings from China and lectured actively on such topics as the Brahma Net Sutra and the precepts. Dao-xuan's lectures on the Flower Garland Sutra and his knowledge of Huayan School teachings inspired Emperor Shōmu to construct the Tōdai-ji temple as the center for further studies of the Huayan school. It is also recorded that he chanted dharani during the opening ceremony of the Great Buddha at Tōdai-ji temple. In 751, he was appointed as "precept master", and greeted Ganjin upon arrival as well as Bodhisena.

By 760, his health declined and he was forced to withdraw to Hisodera temple in Yoshino Province, where he died.
