= Kamen Rider (1971 TV series) =

Japanese television series (1971-1973)

- Also known as: Masked Rider
- Genre: Tokusatsu; Superhero; Horror; Science fiction
- Created by: Shotaro Ishinomori
- Based on: Kamen Rider manga by Shotaro Ishinomori
- Developed by: Masaru Igami
- Directed by: Koichi Takemoto
- Starring: Hiroshi Fujioka; Takeshi Sasaki; Jirō Chiba; Akiji Kobayashi; Wakako Oki
- Voices of: Gorō Naya
- Narrated by: Shinji Nakae
- Music by: Shunsuke Kikuchi
- Opening theme: "Let's Go!! Rider Kick!" by Hiroshi Fujioka (#01–13) and Masato Shimon (#14–79) "Rider Action" by Masato Shimon (#80–98)
- Ending theme: "Kamen Rider no Uta" by Masato Shimon (#01–52) "Rider Action" by Masato Shimon (#53–79) "Lonely Kamen Rider" by Masato Shimon (#80–98)
- Country of origin: Japan
- No. of episodes: 98

Production
- Running time: 20–25 minutes
- Production companies: Toei Company; Mainichi Broadcasting System

Original release
- Network: ANN (MBS, NET)
- Release: April 3, 1971 – February 10, 1973

Related
- Kamen Rider V3
- Manga
- Written by: Shotaro Ishinomori
- Published by: Kodansha
- Magazine: Weekly Shōnen Magazine
- Original run: 1971 – 1973
- Volumes: 4

Kamen Rider (仮面ライダー, Kamen Raidā) is a Japanese tokusatsu superhero television series and weekly science fiction manga created by manga artist Shotaro Ishinomori. The original airing consisted of a total of 98 episodes and were broadcast from April 3, 1971, to February 10, 1973, on Mainichi Broadcasting System and NET (now TV Asahi). The manga adaptation was also featured in Shōnen Magazine around the same period. The series has evolved into a franchise with many subsequent annual iterations.

The series spawned a second boom in tokusatsu shows, and was Toei's first commercialised series. During its run the brand sold 620 million bags of popcorn (branded Kamen Rider Snack), 3.8 million transformation belts and 300,000 bikes.

== Story ==
The series takes place in a world plagued by Shocker, a mysterious worldwide terrorist organization formed mostly by remaining members of the Nazis. To further its plans for world domination, Shocker recruited its agents through kidnapping, turning their victims into mutant cyborgs (改造人間, kaizō ningen; lit. 'transhuman') and, ultimately, brainwashing them. However, one victim named Takeshi Hongo escaped just before the final brainwashing. With his sanity and moral conscience intact, Takeshi wages a one-man war against Shocker's minions as the grasshopper-themed cyborg superhero Kamen Rider. Another victim of the cyborg process, freelance photographer Hayato Ichimonji, became Kamen Rider 2 after Kamen Rider, who eventually renamed himself "Kamen Rider 1", saved him from Shocker's brainwashing. Assisted by motorcycle race team manager Tobei Tachibana and FBI agent Kazuya Taki, the Kamen Riders fought in both solo and partnered missions against Shocker while later getting help from Tobei and Kazuya's Kamen Rider Kid Corps. Later, after many battles with Shocker the organization was wiped out and its leader created Gel-Shocker to fulfill his goals. After many battles with Gel-Shocker the Kamen Riders defeated the organization's leader and stopped Gel-Shocker. With Kazuya returning to America peace was restored, or so it seems.

== Manga ==
Many manga based on the original Kamen Rider series have been published, but only one was penned and drawn by Ishinomori himself. Ishinomori was also the author of one chapter of the Kamen Rider Amazon manga and the entire Kamen Rider Black manga. However, those manga were based on sequels to Kamen Rider, rather than the original series.

The original manga, published in 1971, initially follows a path resembling the first few episodes of the TV series, from basic plot to creature designs. However, when Takeshi leaves the story, the series diverge greatly. In the TV show, Takeshi travels abroad to fight Shocker in other countries, leaving Japan's protection to Hayato Ichimonji, a freelance cameraman who was experimented on by Shocker but saved by Takeshi, becoming the second Kamen Rider. In the manga, Takeshi never left Japan. He was confronted by twelve "Shocker Riders" and was subsequently mortally wounded during his battle against them. Hayato Ichimonji, one of the twelve Shocker Riders, receives a head injury during the fight and regains his conscience as a result. He then turns against Shocker and takes Takeshi's role as Kamen Rider. In spite of the damage to his body, Takeshi's brain survives and guides Hayato, the two fighting as one.

Takeshi eventually returns as a Rider in both stories, but starting with Hayato's debut, villains and even basic story development greatly diverge between the two versions. The manga portrays a seemingly hopeless battle against Shocker, an organization with ties to governmental conspiracies that seems much bigger than either of the two Riders. The live action TV shows portray the Riders as heroes strong enough to bring down Shocker, only to see it replaced by similar organizations led by Shocker's mysterious leader. The Shocker Riders eventually appear in the TV series, too, but they looked different and had different abilities. There were also only six Shocker Riders, rather than the manga's 12.

In February 2021, Seven Seas Entertainment announced they licensed the original manga for publication in one omnibus edition.

== Characters ==
=== Kamen Riders ===
- Takeshi Hongo/Kamen Rider 1 (本郷 猛/仮面ライダー1号, Hongō Takeshi/Kamen Raidā Ichigō; 1–13, 40–41, 49, 51–98): The first main protagonist. A biochemistry lab student at Jonan University who also races motorcycles as part of the Tachibana Racing Club.
- Hayato Ichimonji/Kamen Rider 2 (一文字 隼人/仮面ライダー2号, Ichimonji Hayato/Kamen Raidā Nigō; 14–52, 72–73, 93–94, 98): The other main protagonist. A freelance photographer who becomes the second Kamen Rider after Takeshi saves him from Shocker.

=== Allies ===
- Tobei Tachibana (立花 藤兵衛, Tachibana Tōbee): Takeshi's racing mentor and confidant. He is often called "Pops" by other members of his racing club. He runs a small café named Snack Amigo where Hongo and other members of Tachibana's racing club gather in early episodes, and its employees occasionally assist Hongo in countering Shocker's plans. At the same time as Takeshi's departure, he opens a motorcycle goods shop named Tachibana Auto Corner and sets up the Tachibana Racing Club. He is often seen smoking a pipe.
- Kazuya Taki (滝 和也, Taki Kazuya): An FBI agent assigned to investigate Shocker activities in Japan. While not himself a cyborg, Kazuya was skilled in martial arts and often used them alongside both Kamen Riders to battle the combatants who invariably accompanied a Shocker commander.
- Hiroshi Midorikawa (緑川 弘, Midorikawa Hiroshi): Takeshi's teacher at university and an authority on biochemistry. He is a Shocker scientist, but freed Takeshi and was killed by Spider Man, an agent of Shocker.
- Ruriko Midorikawa (緑川 ルリ子, Midorikawa Ruriko): The daughter of Doctor Midorikawa, she initially blames Takeshi for her father's death, but eventually learns the truth and becomes his ally. In episode 14, it is revealed that she accompanied Takeshi on his quest to defeat Shocker activities in Europe.
- Hiromi Nohara (野原 ひろみ, Nohara Hiromi): Ruriko's fellow student, who works as a waitress at Snack Amigo.
- Shiro (史郎, Shirō): A bartender at Snack Amigo.
- Rider Girls (ライダーガールズ, Raidā Gāruzu): Female members of the Tachibana Racing Club who assist both Kamen Riders.
  - Yuri (ユリ): Hiromi's friend who is a first-degree black belt in karate.
  - Mari (マリ): Hiromi's friend who has experience in fencing.
  - Michi (ミチ): Hiromi's friend who has experience in aikido and is a small-displacement rider.
  - Emi (エミ): Takeshi's assistant from Switzerland who has experience in aikido.
  - Mika (ミカ): Takeshi's assistant from Switzerland who is good at fortune-telling by playing cards.
  - Tokko (トッコ): She is in charge of cooking in the Tachibana Racing Club.
  - Yokko (ヨッコ): After the Kamen Rider Kid Corps was set up, she was in charge of communication and administration.
  - Choko (チョコ): She likes food.
- Goro Ishikura (石倉 五郎, Ishikura Gorō): A bright boy who frequents the Tachibana Racing Club.
- Kamen Rider Kid Corps (少年仮面ライダー隊, Shōnen Kamen Raidā-tai): A nationwide organization, with Tobei as the president and Kazuya as the captain that is composed of boys and girls in episode 74.
  - Naoki & Mitsuru (ナオキ&ミツル): Two boys who serve as leading members.

=== Shocker ===
Shocker (ショッカー, Shokkā) is a terrorist organization aiming to conquer the world. To this end, their scientists turn humans into superhuman cyborgs by surgically altering them with animal and insect DNA with robotic cybernetics. Virtually all of its members are modified the same way. Even a Shocker Combatant is tougher, faster, and stronger than an ordinary human civilian. The original manga showed that Shocker had influence over the governments of the world. Its founders had ties to the Nazis, Illuminati and the Kamen Rider Spirits manga makes references to the group's support by the Badan Empire.

Ruthless and merciless, Shocker would often kidnap prominent scientists and force them to work for the organization, then kill them when their usefulness was at an end, or if they attempted to escape. The decision to kidnap and modify college student Takeshi Hongo proved to be their undoing. He was intended to be another of Shocker's powerful cyborg warriors, a grasshopper-human hybrid, but he escaped and opposed them as Kamen Rider 1. A later attempt to create a second, more powerful Kamen Rider backfired when the intended victim, Hayato Ichimonji, was rescued by the original Rider before he was brainwashed and became Kamen Rider 2. The pair, known as the Double Riders, put an end to Shocker, and later its remnants, who formed Gel-Shocker after their disbandment.

In OOO, Den-O, All Riders: Let's Go Kamen Riders, Shocker, although with a membership and leadership covering Gel-Shocker members from the original TV series, obtained a Core Medal and modified it into the Shocker Medal. Though they were originally unable to use it, the appearance of the Greeed Ankh in their time enabled the organization to obtain one of his Cell Medals and create the Shocker Greeed. This altered time so that Shocker defeated the Double Riders and managed to conquer all of Japan and eventually the world, setting up a union with many of the other organizations that originally emerged after Shocker's destruction. The group is ultimately defeated by the Kamen Riders.

During the events of Super Hero Taisen GP: Kamen Rider 3, Shocker's remaining scientists created a History Modification Machine in order to send a time displaced cyborg called Kamen Rider Three back in time to destroy the Double Riders in the aftermath of Gel-Shocker's defeat, creating a new timeline where Shocker rules the world with some Kamen Riders in their service. Luckily, the apparent destruction of the History Modification Machine restores the timeline (with the exception of Go Shijima/Kamen Rider Mach who was killed by Cheetahkatatsumuri), only to be found out during the events of D-Video Special: Kamen Rider Four that Shocker secretly uses it to create time loops and alters the timeline once more, allowing them to create Kamen Rider Four, as well as the revelation that they have been targeting Takumi Inui, due to his sacrifice-less wish to ensure that no one dies like what happened to one of his old allies to create a loop. In the end, Takumi destroys the machine and disappears alongside the modified timeline, restored back to its original timeline once more.

In the movie Kamen Rider 1, there is a civil war between the original Shocker and a newly formed organization called Nova Shocker in an attempt to kidnap Mayu, Tobei Tachibana's granddaughter, and release the Alexander Gamma Eyecon from her body, in order to obtain its power. As all of the revived Ambassador Hell's Shocker faction had been annihilated completely, he makes an uneasy alliance with Kamen Riders Ghost, Specter and a newly improved Kamen Rider 1.

- Shocker Leader (ショッカー首領, Shokkā Shuryō): The high ruler of the organization and main antagonist of the series. He appears for the first time in short video footage shown in episode 34, although his appearance there is mostly hidden by shadows. He talks with his followers through speakers on Shocker's emblems in the multiple outposts. The Shocker Leader is a cruel being who does not have qualms in sacrificing his minions during moments of crisis or failure. He would later become the Gel-Shocker Leader (ゲルショッカー首領, Gerushokkā Shuryō) when Shocker merged with Geldam to form Gel-Shocker. He takes various forms, his first being a cyclopean gorgon in crimson robes in the original series, his second being a skeletal creature in Kamen Rider V3, following a skull-faced insect who leads a mini-restoration of Shocker known as Black Satan, and his true form is known as the Great Leader Rock (岩石大首領, Ganseki Daishuryō) in Kamen Rider Stronger where he is a giant humanoid rock man controlled by a large one-eyed cybernetic brain.
- Colonel Zol/Wolf-Man (ゾル大佐/狼男, Zoru-taisa/Ōkami Otoko) (a.k.a. Golden Wolf-Man (黄金狼男, Ōgon Ōkami Otoko)): From Shocker's Near and Middle East Branch, his true form was a wolf-like monster. He was also a disguise specialist, able to mimic Taki's appearance almost perfectly in his debut. He confronted Kamen Rider 2 himself in episode 39 and after a lengthy fight was toppled off a cliff by Kamen Rider 2's Rider Punch, destroying him. Gold Wolf-Man briefly appeared in Kamen Rider vs. Shocker among the members of the resurrected monster army. In Kamen Rider V3, Colonel Zol is resurrected alongside the other three great Shocker and Gel-Shocker commanders from the original TV series by Destron. He aims to become a Destron commander, replacing Doctor G. However, after Kamen Rider V3 escaped from Destron's base, a self-destruction sequence was activated, and Colonel Zol was unable to escape, dying again with it. In the Kamen Rider Spirits manga, he is revived with other Shocker commanders as a soulless pawn of the Badan Empire.
- Doctor Death/Ikadevil (死神博士/イカデビル, Shinigami-hakase/Ikadebiru): From Shocker's branch in Switzerland, he took over Japan's command after Zol's death until Ambassador Hell appeared. However, he returned to Japan in episode 61, working together with Ambassador Hell and also attempting his own plans. He had cold and calculating behavior. In episode 68, he captured Tobei to help train him for his battle with Kamen Rider 1, which allowed Tobei to learn that his head was his weak point. With Tobei's guidance, Kamen Rider 1 managed to overpower Doctor Death in his squid-like monster form, Ikadevil, and weaken him with a Rider Chop before sending Ikadevil falling to his death. Doctor Death was resurrected by Destron in Kamen Rider V3, and died shortly afterwards when Destron's base accidentally self-destructed. He is revived as a soulless pawn of the Badan Empire alongside Colonel Zol and Ambassador Hell in the Kamen Rider Spirits manga.
- Ambassador Hell/Garagaranda (地獄大使/ガラガランダ, Jigoku-taishi/Garagaranda): Summoned from Shocker's branch in Southeast Asia, he took command of the organisation in Japan. His true name was Damon (ダモン) according to Kamen Rider Spirits. He used an electromagnetic whip and an iron claw as his weapons. In episode 79, after capturing the Riders' friends, he called Hongo out as he assumed his rattlesnake-like monster form, able to burrow underground and use his whip arm as a weapon. Kamen Rider 1 battled Garagaranda, managing to use his Rider Kick on the monster and causing him to explode. This led to the collapse of the original Shocker. In spite of his failure, Ambassador Hell was resurrected by Destron in Kamen Rider V3. His sneaky behavior ended up leading to the prisoner V3 capturing him and escaping from the Destron base. Soon afterwards, Ambassador Hell returned to the base, only to die in its self-destruction. Ambassador Hell returns in the Kamen Rider Spirits manga, working for the Badan Empire. In Kamen Rider ZX, the Ambassador of Darkness, Ambassador Hell's younger cousin, appeared as a Badan Empire leader.
- Shocker Combatants (ショッカー戦闘員, Shokkā Sentōin): Black uniformed soldiers, some of the later versions having skeleton markings on their torsos. They are normally easily defeated by the Riders, often without even needing to transform. Their trademark is a high-pitched battle-cry.
- Big Machine (ビッグマシン, Biggu Mashin): A character who only appears in Ishinomori's original Kamen Rider manga. Big Machine is Shocker's highest commander and main antagonist in the manga. He also seems to be the one called "Shocker Leader" by some of the lower ranking Shocker members. He has a fully mechanized body and is behind Shocker's "October Project", which involves using a supercomputer to brainwash the population of Japan. He's able to match up the Riders in combat and launch attacks that disrupt electronic equipment, including Rider 1's and 2's own bodies. The design of his body was the base of Ambassador Hell's design in the TV show, although it was altered to allow a human face and, unlike Big Machine, Ambassador Hell was kept a separate character from the Shocker Leader. In Kamen Rider × Super Sentai: Super Hero Taisen, Big Machine is reimagined as a project of the Shocker/Zangyack Alliance to create a giant robot from the Crisis Fortress and the Gigant Horse.

==== Shocker monsters ====
The Shocker monsters used by Shocker are formerly humans who were enhanced with animal DNA and cybernetics.

- Spider Man (蜘蛛男, Kumo Otoko) – A spider monster with heightened strength and agility. Spider Man was responsible for the capture of Takeshi Hongo, who would later become the first Kamen Rider. Not to be confused with the Marvel Comics character with a similar name.
- Bat Man (蝙蝠男, Kōmori Otoko) (a.k.a. Human Bat (人間蝙蝠, Ningen Kōmori)) - A bat monster. Not to be confused with the similarly named DC Comics character.
- Scorpion Man (さそり男, Sasori Otoko) (a.k.a. Scorpion Human (さそり人間, Sasori Ningen)) - A scorpion monster.
- Sarracenian (サラセニアン, Sarasenian) (a.k.a. Sarracenia Human (サラセニア人間, Sarasenia Ningen)) - A sarracenia monster.
- Mantis Man (かまきり男, Kamakiri Otoko) - A mantis monster.
- Grimreaper Chameleon (死神カメレオン, Shinigami Kamereon) (a.k.a. Chameleon Man (カメレオン男, Kamereon Otoko)) - A chameleon monster.
- Wasp Woman (蜂女, Hachi Onna) - A female bee monster who wields a rapier as her weapon.
- Cobra Man (コブラ男, Kobura Otoko) - A cobra monster.
- Gebacondor (ゲバコンドル, Gebakondoru) - A condor monster.
- Yamogeras (ヤモゲラス, Yamogerasu) - A gecko monster.
- Tokageron (トカゲロン, Tokageron) - Originally an arrogant soccer player named Ken Nomoto (野本健, Nomoto Ken), he fell into Shocker's sights due to his leg strength. Though he escapes Grimreaper Chameleon, Nomoto is captured by Spider Man as he was then converted into a lizard cyborg. Retaining his arrogance, Togakeron is used in Shocker's scheme down the Tokyo Atomic Energy lab's barrier with Shocker's "Barrier Destruction Ball" bomb for the Revived Kaijin Corps (再生怪人軍団, Saisei Kaijin Gundan) to storm in and get the materials within. Though he defeats Kamen Rider 1's Rider Kick, Hongo musters the new Lightning Rider Kick and uses it to kick the Barrier Destruction Ball back to Tokageron and the defeated Revived Kaijin Corps, destroying them all as the bomb detonates.
- Saboteguron (サボテグロン, Saboteguron) - A cactus monster.
- Phirasaurus (ピラザウルス, Pirazaurusu) (a.k.a. Phirasaurus Human (人間ピラザウルス, Ningen Pirazaurusu)) – A piranha/dinosaur monster.
- Hitodanger (ヒトデンジャー, Hitodenjā) - A giant starfish monster.
- Kanibubbler (カニバブラー, Kanibaburā) - A crab monster.
- Dokugandar's Caterpillar Form (ドクガンダー, Dokugandā) – A caterpillar monster.
  - Dokugandar's Imago Form - Dokugandar's moth monster form. The form Dokugandar took after breaking from its white cocoon.
- Amazonia (アマゾニア, Amazonia) - A piranha monster.
- Musasabeedle (ムササビードル, Musasabīdoru) - A Japanese giant flying squirrel monster.
- Kinokomorgu (キノコモルグ, Kinokomorugu) – A mushroom monster.
- Colonel Zol's monsters - These are the monsters used by Colonel Zol.
  - Antlion Thunder (地獄サンダー, Jigoku Sandā) - An antlion monster.
  - Mukaderas (ムカデラス, Mukaderasu) - A centipede monster.
  - Mogurang (モグラング, Mogurangu) – A mole monster.
  - Kuragedarl (クラゲダール, Kuragedāru) - A jellyfish monster.
  - Zanburonzo (ザンブロンゾ, Zanburonzo) - A trilobite monster.
  - Arigabari (アリガバリ, Arigabari) - A giant anteater monster.
  - Dokudahlian (ドクダリアン, Dokudarian) – A flower monster.
  - Armadillong (アルマジロング, Arumajirongu) – An armadillo monster.
  - Gamagirah (ガマギラー, Gamagirā) – A toad monster.
  - Arikimedes (アリキメデス, Arikimedesu) - A queen ant monster.
  - Egyptas (エジプタス, Ejiputasu) – An Egyptian mummy altered into a mummy monster by Shocker Japan under Colonel Zol's orders.
  - Torikabuto (トリカブト, Torikabuto) – An aconitum monster.
  - Eiking (エイキング, Eikingu) - A stingray monster.
  - Wolf Man (狼男, Ōkami Otoko) (a.k.a. Experimental Wolf Man (実験用狼男, Jikkenyō Ōkami Otoko)) - An experimental wolf monster created by the wolf virus.
- Doctor Death's monsters - These are the monsters used by Doctor Shinigami.
  - Snowman (スノーマン, Sunōman) - A yeti monster.
  - Ghoster (ゴースター, Gōsutā) - A magma monster.
  - Fly Man (ハエ男, Hae Otoko) - A fly monster.
  - Pranodon (プラノドン, Puranodon) - A pteranodon monster.
  - Kabibinga (カビビンガ, Kabibinga) - A mold monster
  - Namekujira (ナメクジラ, Namekujira) - A slug monster.
  - Bearkonger (ベアーコンガー, Beākongā) - A brown bear/cougar monster.
  - Todogirah (トドギラー, Todogirā) - A steller sea lion monster.
  - Hiruguerrilla (ヒルゲリラ, Hirugerira) - A leech monster.
  - Isoginchak (イソギンチャック, Isoginchakku) - A sea anemone monster.
  - Kamestone (カメストーン, Kamesutōn) - A turtle monster.
  - Unicornos (ユニコルノス, Yunikorunosu) - A unicorn monster.
  - Gilgalass (ギルガラス, Girugarasu) - A jungle crow monster.
  - Namazugiller (ナマズギラー, Namazugirā) - An electric catfish monster.
  - Saigang (サイギャング, Saigyangu) - A rhinoceros monster.
- Ambassador Hell's monsters - These are the monsters used by Ambassador Hell.
  - Jaguarman (ジャガーマン, Jagāman) - A jaguar monster.
  - Sea Snake Man (海蛇男, Umihebi Otoko) - A sea snake monster.
  - Cockroach Man (ごきぶり男, Gokiburi Otoko) - A cockroach monster.
  - Dokumondo (ドクモンド, Dokumondo) - A ground spider monster.
  - Poison Lizard Man (毒トカゲ男, Dokutokage Otoko) - A frilled lizard monster.
  - Earthworm Man (ミミズ男, Mimizu Otoko) - An earthworm monster.
  - Owl Man (フクロウ男, Fukurō Otoko) - An owl monster.
  - Harinezuras (ハリネズラス, Harinezurasu) - A hedgehog monster.
  - Semiminga (セミミンガ, Semiminga) - A cicada monster.
  - Kabutorong (カブトロング, Kabutorongu) - A Japanese rhinoceros beetle monster.
  - Kamikirikid (カミキリキッド, Kamikirikiddo) - A longhorn beetle monster.
  - Girizames (ギリザメス, Girizamesu) - A sawshark monster.
  - Gillerkorogi (ギラーコオロギ, Girākōrogi) - A cricket monster.
  - Elekibotaru (エレキボタル, Erekibotaru) - A firefly monster.
  - Abugomens (アブゴメス, Abugomesu) - A horse-fly monster.
  - Mosquiras (モスキラス, Mosukirasu) - A mosquito monster.
  - Shiomaneking (シオマネキング, Shiomanekingu) - A fiddler crab monster.
  - Shiracuras (シラキュラス, Shirakyurasu) - A crab louse monster.
  - Bararanga (バラランガ, Bararanga) - A rose monster.
  - Seadragon I (シードラゴンⅠ世, Shīdoragon Issei) - A seahorse monster.
  - Seadragon II (シードラゴンⅡ世, Shīdoragon Nisei) - A seahorse monster.
  - Seadragon III (シードラゴンⅢ世, Shīdoragon Sansei) - A seahorse monster.
  - Imoriges (イモリゲス, Imorigesu) - A newt monster.
  - Unidogma (ウニドグマ, Unidoguma) - A sea urchin monster.

=== Gel-Shocker ===
Gel-Shocker (ゲルショッカー, Gerushokkā) was formed after the disbandment of Shocker, with the remnants of the organization absorbing another organization Geldam (ゲルダム団, Gerudamu-dan) trained in the deserts of Africa. After Ambassador Hell's defeat, the Shocker Leader reorganized the organization from the ground up, destroying all remaining secret bases and even killing the remaining troop contingent in a bloody forest massacre witnessed by unfortunate campers.

- General Black (ブラック将軍, Burakku-shōgun): The leader of Gel-Shocker. General Black is a commander originally from Geldam who had a monstrous leech/chameleon hybrid form called Hilchameleon (ヒルカメレオン, Hirukamereon) who had the ability to suck blood by hugging humans, which was later used to revive Gel-Shocker monsters after already being defeated by the Double Riders, throwing leeches which cause the target to follow his orders and turn himself invisible. Later, he fought the Double Riders on a roller coaster and was defeated by their Rider Double Chop while turning invisible. Weakened, he reverted to his human form and cursed the Double Riders before exploding. Eventually, General Black was resurrected and worked for Destron in an important operation but ended up dying in the self-destruction of a Destron base. Black returned as a soulless pawn of the Badan Empire in the Kamen Rider Spirits manga, but he was defeated by a Rider Double Kick performed by Kamen Riders 2 and ZX.
- Gel-Shocker Combatants (ゲルショッカー戦闘員, Geru Shokkā Sentōin): Gel-Shocker Combatants wore bright purple and yellow costumes, were capable of traveling from one place to another by transforming into sheets that would drop down onto unsuspecting victims, and were capable of taking more blunt abuse than their predecessors.
- Shocker Riders (ショッカーライダー, Shokkā Raidā): There were 12 of them instead of the 6 created by Gel-Shocker that later appeared in the TV series. Hayato Ichimonji was one of them. In episode 15, Hayato had a brief flashback about his capture by Shocker. A Shocker surgeon told him that he'd become a cyborg to fight against the Kamen Rider. Afterwards, Hayato mentioned that he was saved by Kamen Rider 1, but the specific circumstances of that event are not clear.

==== Gel-Shocker monsters ====
The Gel-Shocker monsters are hybrids of two different animals or an animal and a plant.

- Ganikoumoru (ガニコウモル, Ganikōmoru): A crab/bat monster who is the only monster of Geldam to appear in the series before it combined with the remnants of Shocker. Destroyed by Kamen Rider 1. He was later revived in a new appearance called Revived Ganikoumoru (再生ガニコウモル, Saisei Ganikōmoru)
- Sasori Tokagues (サソリトカゲス, Sasori Tokagesu): A scorpion/lizard monster.
- Kurage Wolf (クラゲウルフ, Kurage Urufu): A jellyfish/wolf monster.
- Ino Kabuton (イノカブトン): A wild boar/Japanese rhinoceros beetle monster.
- Isoguin Jaguar (イソギンジャガー, Isogin Jagā): A sea anemone/jaguar monster created from a man named Yosuke Katsurojou.
- Utsubo Games (ウツボガメス, Utsubo Gamesu): A moray eel/turtle monster.
- Washi Kamaguilli (ワシカマギリ, Washi Kamagiri): An eagle/mantis monster.
- Kumo Lion (クモライオン, Kumo Raion): A golden silk spider/lion monster.
- Neko Yamori (ネコヤモリ): A cat/gecko monster.
- Canary Cobra (カナリアコブラ, Kanaria Kobura): A canary/cobra monster.
- Nezcondor (ネズコンドル, Nezukondoru): A house mouse/condor monster. He was later enhanced into Remodeled Nezcondor (改造ネズコンドル, Kaizō Nezukondoru).
- Mukade Tiger (ムカデタイガー, Mukade Taigā): A centipede/tiger monster.
- Haetori Bachi (ハエトリバチ): A Venus flytrap/bee monster.
- Ei Dokugar (エイドクガー, Ei Dokugā): A ray/moth monster.
- Namekuji Kinoka (ナメクジキノコ): A slug/mushroom monster.
- Garaox (ガラオックス, Garaokkusu): A jungle crow/ox monster.
- Saboten Bat (サボテンバット, Saboten Batto): A cactus/bat monster.

== Episodes ==
No.	Title	Directed by	Written by	Original release date
1	"The Eerie Spider Man"; Transliteration: "Kaiki Kumo Otoko" (Japanese: 怪奇蜘蛛男)	Koichi Takemoto	Masaru Igami	April 3, 1971
2	"The Terrifying Bat Man"; Transliteration: "Kyōfu Kōmori Otoko" (Japanese: 恐怖蝙蝠男)	Itaru Orita	Masaru Igami	April 10, 1971
3	"The Monstrous Scorpion Man"; Transliteration: "Kaijin Sasori Otoko" (Japanese: 怪人さそり男)	Koichi Takemoto	Masaru Igami	April 17, 1971
4	"The Man-Eating Sarracenian"; Transliteration: "Hitokui Sarasenian" (Japanese: 人喰いサラセニアン)	Itaru Orita	Shin'ichi Ichikawa; Masayuki Shimada	April 24, 1971
5	"The Monstrous Mantis Man"; Transliteration: "Kaijin Kamakiri Otoko" (Japanese: 怪人かまきり男)	Hidetoshi Kitamura	Mari Takizawa	May 1, 1971
6	"The Deadly Chameleon"; Transliteration: "Shinigami Kamereon" (Japanese: 死神カメレオン)	Itaru Orita	Masaru Igami	May 8, 1971
7	"The Deadly Chameleon! Showdown at the Old World's Fair!"; Transliteration: "Shinigami Kamereon Kettō! Banpaku Ato" (Japanese: 死神カメレオン決闘！万博跡)	Itaru Orita	Masaru Igami	May 15, 1971
8	"The Creepy Wasp Woman"; Transliteration: "Kaii! Hachi Onna" (Japanese: 怪異！蜂女)	Hidetoshi Kitamura	Mari Takizawa	May 22, 1971
9	"The Monstrous Cobra Man"; Transliteration: "Kyōfu Kobura Otoko" (Japanese: 恐怖コブラ男)	Minoru Yamada	Katsuhiko Taguchi	May 29, 1971
10	"The Reborn Cobra Man"; Transliteration: "Yomigaeru Kobura Otoko" (Japanese: よみがえるコブラ男)	Minoru Yamada	Katsuhiko Taguchi	June 5, 1971
11	"Blood-Sucking Monster Gebacondor"; Transliteration: "Kyūketsu Kaijin Gebakondoru" (Japanese: 吸血怪人ゲバコンドル)	Itaru Orita	Takao Nagaishi	June 12, 1971
12	"The Murderous Yamogeras"; Transliteration: "Satsujin Yamogerasu" (Japanese: 殺人ヤモゲラス)	Itaru Orita	Mari Takizawa	June 19, 1971
13	"Tokageron and the Monster Army!"; Transliteration: "Tokageron to Kaijin Dai Gundan" (Japanese: トカゲロンと怪人大軍団)	Hidetoshi Kitamura	Masaru Igami	June 26, 1971
14	"The Devilish Sabotegron Attacks!"; Transliteration: "Majin Saboteguron no Shūrai" (Japanese: 魔人サボテグロンの襲来)	Itaru Orita	Masaru Igami	July 3, 1971
15	"Sabotegron Strikes Back"; Transliteration: "Gyakushū Saboteguron" (Japanese: 逆襲サボテグロン)	Itaru Orita	Masaru Igami	July 10, 1971
16	"The Devil Wrestler Pirasaurus"; Transliteration: "Akuma no Resurā Pirazaurusu" (Japanese: 悪魔のレスラーピラザウルス)	Itaru Orita	Masaru Igami	July 17, 1971
17	"Deathmatch in the Ring! Defeat Pirasaurus!"; Transliteration: "Ringu No Shitō Taose! Pirazaurusu" (Japanese: リングの死闘倒せ！ピラザウルス)	Itaru Orita	Masaru Igami	July 24, 1971
18	"Fossil Man Hitodanger"; Transliteration: "Kaseki-Otoko Hitodenjā" (Japanese: 化石男ヒトデンジャー)	Minoru Yamada	Mari Takizawa	July 31, 1971
19	"The Monstrous Kanibubbler Appears in Hokkaido"; Transliteration: "Kaijin Kanibaburā Hokkaidō ni Arawaru" (Japanese: 怪人カニバブラー北海道に現る)	Itaru Orita	Masayuki Shimada	August 7, 1971
20	"The Fire-Breathing Caterpillar Monster, Dokugandar"; Transliteration: "Hi o Fuku Kemushi Kaijin Dokugandā" (Japanese: 火を吹く毛虫怪人ドクガンダー)	Minoru Yamada	Katsuhiko Taguchi	August 14, 1971
21	"Dokugandar, Battle at Osaka Castle!"; Transliteration: "Dokugandā Ōsaka-jō no Taiketsu!" (Japanese: ドクガンダー 大阪城の対決！)	Minoru Yamada	Katsuhiko Taguchi	August 21, 1971
22	"Monstrous Merman Amazonia"; Transliteration: "Kaigyojin Amazonia" (Japanese: 怪魚人アマゾニア)	Minoru Yamada	Masahiro Tsukada	August 28, 1971
23	"Soaring Monster Musasabedle"; Transliteration: "Soratobu Kaijin Musasabīdoru" (Japanese: 空飛ぶ怪人ムササビードル)	Itaru Orita	Masayuki Shimada	September 4, 1971
24	"Poisonous Monster Kinokomorgue Attacks!"; Transliteration: "Mōdoku Kaijin Kinokomorugu no Shutsugeki!" (Japanese: 猛毒怪人キノコモルグの出撃！)	Minoru Yamada	Mari Takizawa	September 11, 1971
25	"Defeat Kinokomorgue!"; Transliteration: "Kinokomorugu o Taose!" (Japanese: キノコモルグを倒せ！)	Minoru Yamada	Mari Takizawa	September 18, 1971
26	"The Terrifying Antlion Pit"; Transliteration: "Kyōfu no Arijigoku" (Japanese: 恐怖のあり地獄)	Itaru Orita	Masaru Igami	September 25, 1971
27	"Mukaderas's Monster School"; Transliteration: "Mukaderasu Kaijin Kyōshitsu" (Japanese: ムカデラス怪人教室)	Itaru Orita	Masaru Igami	October 2, 1971
28	"Underground Monster Mogurang"; Transliteration: "Chitei Kaijin Mogurangu" (Japanese: 地底怪人モグラング)	Issaku Uchida	Mari Takizawa	October 9, 1971
29	"The Electric Monster Kuragedarl"; Transliteration: "Denki Kaijin Kuragedāru" (Japanese: 電気怪人クラゲダール)	Katsuhiko Taguchi	Mari Takizawa	October 16, 1971
30	"Reborn Fossil: The Bloodsucking Trilobite"; Transliteration: "Yomigaeru Kaseki Kyūketsu San'yōchū" (Japanese: よみがえる化石吸血三葉虫)	Issaku Uchida	Mari Takizawa	October 23, 1971
31	"Deathmatch! The Ant-eating Devil Arigabari"; Transliteration: "Shitō! Arikui Majin Arigabari" (Japanese: 死斗！ありくい魔人アリガバリ)	Katsuhiko Taguchi	Masaru Igami	October 30, 1971
32	"The Man-Eating Flower, Dokudahlian"; Transliteration: "Hitokui Hana Dokudarian" (Japanese: 人喰い花ドクダリアン)	Itaru Orita	Mari Takizawa	November 6, 1971
33	"Steel Monster Armadillong"; Transliteration: "Kōtetsu Kaijin Arumajirongu" (Japanese: 鋼鉄怪人アルマジロング)	Katsuhiko Taguchi	Masayuki Shimada	November 13, 1971
34	"Japan in Peril! Gamagiller's Invasion"; Transliteration: "Nihon Ayaushi! Gamagirā no Shin'nyū" (Japanese: 日本危うし！ガマギラーの侵入)	Minoru Yamada	Mari Takizawa	November 20, 1971
35	"The Killer Queen Ant, Arikimedes"; Transliteration: "Satsujin Joōari Arikimedesu" (Japanese: 殺人女王蟻アリキメデス)	Katsuhiko Taguchi	Masaru Igami	November 27, 1971
36	"The Revived Mummy Monster, Egyptus"; Transliteration: "Ikikaetta Miira Kaijin Ejiputasu" (Japanese: いきかえったミイラ怪人エジプタス)	Katsuhiko Taguchi	Masayuki Shimada	December 4, 1971
37	"Poison Gas Monster Torikabuto's Operation: G"; Transliteration: "Dokugasu Kaijin Torikabuto no Jī Sakusen" (Japanese: 毒ガス怪人トリカブトのG作戦)	Itaru Orita	Masayuki Shimada	December 11, 1971
38	"Lightning Monster Rayking's Worldwide Blackout Operation"; Transliteration: "Inazuma Kaijin Eikingu no Sekai Ankoku Sakusen" (Japanese: 稲妻怪人エイキングの世界暗黒作戦)	Katsuhiko Taguchi	Masaru Igami	December 18, 1971
39	"The Monstrous Wolf Man's Killer Party"; Transliteration: "Kaijin Ōkami Otoko no Satsujin Dai Pātī" (Japanese: 怪人狼男の殺人大パーティー)	Minoru Yamada	Masaru Igami	December 25, 1971
40	"Deathmatch! The Monstrous Snowman vs. The Two Riders!"; Transliteration: "Shitō! Kaijin Sunōman Tai Futari no Raidā" (Japanese: 死斗！怪人スノーマン対二人のライダー)	Minoru Yamada	Masaru Igami	January 1, 1972
41	"Magma Monster Ghoster! The Great Battle of Sakurajima"; Transliteration: "Maguma Kaijin Gōsutā Sakurajima Dai Kessen" (Japanese: マグマ怪人ゴースター 桜島大決戦)	Minoru Yamada	Masaru Igami	January 8, 1972
42	"The Demonic Assassin, the Eerie Fly Man"; Transliteration: "Akuma no Shisha Kaiki Hae Otoko" (Japanese: 悪魔の使者 怪奇ハエ男)	Minoru Yamada	Masayuki Shimada	January 15, 1972
43	"The Monster-Bird Pranodon Attacks"; Transliteration: "Kai Chōjin Puranodon no Shūgeki" (Japanese: 怪鳥人プラノドンの襲撃)	Katsuhiko Taguchi	Ikuro Suzuki	January 22, 1971
44	"Graveyard Monster Kabibinga"; Transliteration: "Hakaba no Kaijin Kabibinga" (Japanese: 墓場の怪人カビビンガ)	Katsuhiko Taguchi	Mari Takizawa	January 29, 1972
45	"The Monstrous Namekujira's Gas Explosion Plan"; Transliteration: "Kaijin Namekujira no Gaso Bakuhatsu Sakusen" (Japanese: 怪人ナメクジラのガス爆発作戦)	Minoru Yamada	Takeo Oono	February 5, 1972
46	"Showdown!! Snowy Mountain Monster Bearkonger"; Transliteration: "Taiketsu!! Yukiyama Kaijin Beākongā" (Japanese: 対決！！雪山怪人ベアーコンガー)	Masahiro Tsukada	Masayuki Shimada	February 12, 1972
47	"The Deadly Ice Devil Todogiller"; Transliteration: "Shi o Yobu Kōri Majin Todogirā" (Japanese: 死を呼ぶ氷魔人トドギラー)	Katsuhiko Taguchi	Fumio Ishimori	February 19, 1972
48	"Hiruguerrilla of the Vampire Swamp"; Transliteration: "Kyūketsu Numa no Hirugerira" (Japanese: 吸血沼のヒルゲリラ)	Issaku Uchida	Ikuro Suzuki	February 26, 1972
49	"The Man-Eating Monster, Isoginchak"; Transliteration: "Hitokui Kaijin Isoginchakku" (Japanese: 人喰い怪人イソギンチャック)	Issaku Uchida	Kimiyuki Hasegawa	March 4, 1972
50	"The Monstrous Kamestone's Killer Aurora Plan"; Transliteration: "Kaijin Kamesutōn no Satsujin Ōrora Keikaku" (Japanese: 怪人カメストーンの殺人オーロラ計画)	Katsuhiko Taguchi	Fumio Ishimori	March 11, 1972
51	"Rock Monster Unicornos vs. the Double Rider Kick"; Transliteration: "Ishi Kaijin Yunikorunosu Tai Daburu Raidā Kikku" (Japanese: 石怪人ユニコルノス対ダブルライダーキック)	Minoru Yamada	Kimiyuki Hasegawa	March 18, 1972
52	"My Name is Monster Bird Gilgalass!"; Transliteration: "Ore no Na wa Kai Chōjin Girugarasu da!" (Japanese: おれの名は 怪鳥人ギルガラスだ！)	Issaku Uchida	Masaru Igami	March 25, 1972
53	"The Monstrous Jaguar Man's Deadly Motorcycle Battle"; Transliteration: "Kaijin Jagāman Kesshi Ōtobai Ikusa" (Japanese: 怪人ジャガーマン決死のオートバイ戦)	Minoru Yamada	Masaru Igami	April 1, 1972
54	"Seasnake Man of the Ghost Village"; Transliteration: "Yūrei Mura no Umihebi Otoko" (Japanese: ユウレイ村の海蛇男)	Katsuhiko Taguchi	Masaru Igami	April 8, 1972
55	"Cockroach Man!! The Dreadful Germ-Filled Ad Balloon"; Transliteration: "Gokiburi Otoko!! Kyōfu no Saikin Adobarūn" (Japanese: ゴキブリ男！！恐怖の細菌アドバルーン)	Minoru Yamada	Mari Takizawa	April 15, 1972
56	"Poison Butterfly of the Amazon, Gireela"; Transliteration: "Amazon no Doku Chō Girīra" (Japanese: アマゾンの毒蝶ギリーラ)	Minoru Yamada	Mari Takizawa	April 22, 1972
57	"Purseweb Man Dokumondo"; Transliteration: "Tsuchigumo Otoko Dokumondo" (Japanese: 土ぐも男ドクモンド)	Minoru Yamada	Mari Takizawa	April 29, 1972
58	"The Monstrous Bearded Dragon, Deathmatch in Fear Valley!!"; Transliteration: "Kaijin Doku Tokage Osoredani no Kettō!!" (Japanese: 怪人毒トカゲ おそれ谷の決闘！！)	Katsuhiko Taguchi	Masayuki Shimada	May 6, 1972
59	"The Monstrous Worm Man of the Bottomless Swamp!"; Transliteration: "Sokonashi Numa no Kaijin Mimizu Otoko!" (Japanese: 底なし沼の怪人ミミズ男！)	Masahiro Tsukada	Masayuki Shimada	May 13, 1972
60	"The Monstrous Owl Man's Killer X-Rays"; Transliteration: "Kaiki Fukurō Otoko no Satsujin Rentogen" (Japanese: 怪奇フクロウ男の殺人レントゲン)	Issaku Uchida	Mari Takizawa	May 20, 1972
61	"The Monstrous Namazugiller's Electric Hell"; Transliteration: "Kaijin Namazugirā no Denki Jigoku" (Japanese: 怪人ナマズギラーの電気地獄)	Minoru Yamada	Kimio Hirayama; Minoru Yamada	May 27, 1972
62	"The Monstrous Harinezuras's Killer Skull Plan"; Transliteration: "Kaijin Harinezurasu Satsujin Dokuro Sakusen" (Japanese: 怪人ハリネズラス 殺人どくろ作戦)	Minoru Yamada	Masaru Igami	June 3, 1972
63	"The Monstrous Saigang's Deadly Auto Race"; Transliteration: "Kaijin Saigyangu Shi no Ōto Rēsu" (Japanese: 怪人サイギャング 死のオートレース)	Masahiro Tsukada	Masayuki Shimada	June 10, 1972
64	"The Monstrous Semiminga's Song of Slaughter!"; Transliteration: "Kaijin Semiminga Minagoroshi no Uta!" (Japanese: 怪人セミミンガ みな殺しのうた！)	Masahiro Tsukada	Masaru Igami	June 17, 1972
65	"The Monstrous Beetle Professor and the Shocker School"; Transliteration: "Kaijin Konchū Hakase to Shokkā Sukūru" (Japanese: 怪人昆虫博士とショッカースクール)	Issaku Uchida	Masaru Igami	June 24, 1972
66	"The Shocker Graveyard: Monsters Revived"; Transliteration: "Shokkā Hakaba Yomigaeru Kaijin-tachi" (Japanese: ショッカー墓場よみがえる怪人たち)	Masahiro Tsukada	Masaru Igami	July 1, 1972
67	"The Shocker Leader Appears!! Rider in Danger"; Transliteration: "Shokkā Shuryō Shutsugen!! Raidā Ayaushi" (Japanese: ショッカー首領出現！！ライダー危うし)	Masahiro Tsukada	Masaru Igami	July 8, 1972
68	"The Terrifying Truth of Doctor Death?"; Transliteration: "Shinigami-hakase Kyōfu no Shōtai?" (Japanese: 死神博士恐怖の正体？)	Minoru Yamada	Masaru Igami	July 15, 1972
69	"The Monstrous Gillerkorogi's Nails of Death"; Transliteration: "Kaijin Girākōrogi Semaru Shi no Tsume" (Japanese: 怪人ギラーコオロギせまる死のツメ)	Minoru Yamada	Masayuki Shimada	July 22, 1972
70	"The Monstrous Elekibotaru's Fireball Attack!!"; Transliteration: "Kaijin Erekibotaru Hi no Tama Kōgeki!!" (Japanese: 怪人エレキボタル火の玉攻撃！！)	Masahiro Tsukada	Gorou Okeya	July 29, 1972
71	"The Mt. Rokko Pursuit of the Monstrous Abugomes!"; Transliteration: "Kaijin Abugomesu Rokkōsan Daitsuiseki!" (Japanese: 怪人アブゴメス六甲山大ついせき！)	Masahiro Tsukada	Masaru Igami	August 5, 1972
72	"The Blood-Sucking Mosquilas vs. the Two Riders"; Transliteration: "Kyūketsu Mosukirasu Tai Futari Raidā" (Japanese: 吸血モスキラス対二人ライダー)	Minoru Yamada	Ikuro Suzuki	August 12, 1972
73	"Double Riders! Defeat Shiomaneking"; Transliteration: "Daburu Raidā! Taose Shiomanekingu" (Japanese: ダブルライダー！倒せシオマネキング)	Minoru Yamada	Ikuro Suzuki	August 19, 1972
74	"The Deadly Blood-Sucker! Give It Your All, Rider Kid Corps"; Transliteration: "Shi no Kyūketsuma Ganbare!! Raidā Shōnentai" (Japanese: 死の吸血魔 がんばれ！！ライダー少年隊)	Masahiro Tsukada	Masaru Igami	August 26, 1972
75	"The Monstrous Poison Flower Bararanga: Secret of the Terror House"; Transliteration: "Dokubana Kaijin Bararanga Kyōfu no Ie no Himitsu" (Japanese: 毒花怪人バラランガ 恐怖の家の秘密)	Masahiro Tsukada	Ikuro Suzuki	September 2, 1972
76	"Three Electric Monsters: the Seadragons!!"; Transliteration: "Sanbiki no Hatsuden Kaijin Shīdoragon!!" (Japanese: 三匹の発電怪人シードラゴン！！)	Minoru Yamada	Fumio Ishimori	September 9, 1972
77	"The Monster Imoriges, Showdown at Hell Ranch!!"; Transliteration: "Kaijin Imorigesu Jigoku Bokujō no Kettō!!" (Japanese: 怪人イモリゲスじごく牧場の決闘！！)	Masahiro Tsukada	Masaru Igami	September 16, 1972
78	"The Terrifying Unidogma + Ghost Monsters"; Transliteration: "Kyōfu no Unidoguma + Yūrei Kaijin" (Japanese: 恐怖のウニドグマ+ゆうれい怪人)	Masahiro Tsukada	Masaru Igami	September 23, 1972
79	"Ambassador Hell!! His Fearsome True Form?"; Transliteration: "Jigoku-taishi!! Kyōfu no Shōtai?" (Japanese: 地獄大使！！恐怖の正体？)	Masahiro Tsukada	Masaru Igami	September 30, 1972
80	"Gel-Shocker's Debut! The Last Day of Kamen Rider!!"; Transliteration: "Gerushokkā Shutsugen! Kamen Raidā Saigo no Hi!!" (Japanese: ゲルショッカー出現！仮面ライダー最後の日!!)	Minoru Yamada	Masaru Igami	October 7, 1972
81	"Kamen Rider Dies Twice!!"; Transliteration: "Kamen Raidā wa Nido Shinu!" (Japanese: 仮面ライダーは二度死ぬ！)	Minoru Yamada	Masaru Igami	October 14, 1972
82	"The Monstrous Kuragewolf, the Rush Hour of Terror"; Transliteration: "Kaijin Kurageurufu Kyōfu no Rasshuawā" (Japanese: 怪人クラゲウルフ 恐怖のラッシュアワー)	Masahiro Tsukada	Masayuki Shimada	October 21, 1972
83	"Monstrous Inokabuton, Defeat Kamen Rider With Insanity Gas"; Transliteration: "Kaijin Inokabuton Hakkyō Gasu de Raidā o Taose" (Japanese: 怪人イノカブトン 発狂ガスでライダーを倒せ)	Masahiro Tsukada	Fumio Ishimori	October 28, 1972
84	"Rider in Peril! Isoginjaguar's Hellish Trap"; Transliteration: "Ayaushi Raidā! Isoginjagā no Jigoku Wana" (Japanese: 危うしライダー！イソギンジャガーの地獄罠)	Shotaro Ishinomori	Shotaro Ishinomori; Masayuki Shimada	November 4, 1972
85	"The Sludge Monster's Terrifying Killer Smog"; Transliteration: "Hedoro Kaijin Kyōfu no Satsujin Sumoggu" (Japanese: ヘドロ怪人恐怖の殺人スモッグ)	Minoru Yamada	Masayuki Shimada	November 11, 1972
86	"The Monstrous Washikamagiri's Human Hunt"; Transliteration: "Kaijin Washikamagiri no Ningen Gari" (Japanese: 怪人ワシカマギリの人間狩り)	Minoru Yamada	Mari Takizawa	November 18, 1972
87	"Gel-Shocker's Deliveryman of Death!"; Transliteration: "Gerushokkā Shi no Haitatsunin!" (Japanese: ゲルショッカー 死の配達人！)	Masahiro Tsukada	Masaru Igami	November 25, 1972
88	"Scary Story! The Bloodthirsty Black Cat Paintings!"; Transliteration: "Kaiki! Chi o Yobu Kuroneko no E" (Japanese: 怪奇！血をよぶ黒猫の絵)	Masahiro Tsukada	Masayuki Shimada	December 2, 1972
89	"The Terrifying Pet Operation, Send Rider to Hell!"; Transliteration: "Kyōfu no Petto Sakusen Raidā o Jigoku e Otose!" (Japanese: 恐怖のペット作戦 ライダーを地獄へ落とせ！)	Minoru Yamada	Fumio Ishimori	December 9, 1972
90	"The Terrifying Pet Operation, Rider SOS"; Transliteration: "Kyōfu no Petto Sakusen Raidā Esu Ō Esu" (Japanese: 恐怖のペット作戦 ライダーSOS)	Minoru Yamada	Fumio Ishimori	December 16, 1972
91	"Enroll in the Gel-Shocker Terror School"; Transliteration: "Gerushokkā Kyōfu Gakkō ni Nyūgaku Seyo" (Japanese: ゲルショッカー恐怖学校に入学せよ)	Masahiro Tsukada	Masaru Igami	December 23, 1972
92	"Evil! The Fake Kamen Rider!!"; Transliteration: "Kyōaku! Nise Kamen Raidā!!" (Japanese: 凶悪！にせ仮面ライダー！！)	Masahiro Tsukada	Masaru Igami	December 30, 1972
93	"The Eight Kamen Riders"; Transliteration: "Hachinin no Kamen Raidā" (Japanese: 8人の仮面ライダー)	Minoru Yamada	Masaru Igami	January 6, 1973
94	"The Truth Behind Gel-Shocker's Leader!!"; Transliteration: "Gerushokkā Shuryō no Shōtai" (Japanese: ゲルショッカー首領の正体)	Minoru Yamada	Masaru Igami	January 13, 1973
95	"The Monstrous Garaox's Flying Cars!!"; Transliteration: "Kaijin Garaokkusu no Sora Tobu Jidōsha" (Japanese: 怪人ガラオックスの空飛ぶ自動車)	Atsuo Okunaka	Masayuki Shimada	January 20, 1973
96	"Takeshi Hongo Becomes a Cactus Monster!?"; Transliteration: "Hongō Takeshi Saboten Kaijin ni Sareru!?" (Japanese: 本郷猛 サボテン怪人にされる！？)	Atsuo Okunaka	Fumio Maruyama	January 27, 1973
97	"Takeshi Hongo Cannot Transform!!"; Transliteration: "Hongō Takeshi Henshin Fukanō" (Japanese: 本郷猛 変身不可能)	Masahiro Tsukada	Masaru Igami	February 3, 1973
98	"Gel-Shocker Destroyed! The Leader's End!!"; Transliteration: "Gerushokkā Zenmetsu! Shuryō no Saigo!!" (Japanese: ゲルショッカー全滅！首領の最後！！)	Masahiro Tsukada	Masaru Igami	February 10, 1973

== Films ==
- 1971: Go Go Kamen Rider (ゴーゴー仮面ライダー, Gō Gō Kamen Raidā) - A movie version of episode 13.
- 1972: Kamen Rider vs. Shocker (仮面ライダー対ショッカー, Kamen Raidā Tai Shokkā)
- 1972: Kamen Rider vs. Ambassador Hell (仮面ライダー対じごく大使, Kamen Raidā Tai Jigoku-taishi)
- 2005: Kamen Rider: The First
- 2007: Kamen Rider: The Next
- 2011: OOO, Den-O, All Riders: Let's Go Kamen Riders (オーズ・電王・オールライダー レッツゴー仮面ライダー, Ōzu Den'ō Ōru Raidā Rettsu Gō Kamen Raidā)
- 2014: Heisei Rider vs. Shōwa Rider: Kamen Rider Taisen feat. Super Sentai (平成ライダー対昭和ライダー 仮面ライダー大戦 feat.スーパー戦隊, Heisei Raidā Tai Shōwa Raidā Kamen Raidā Taisen Fīcharingu Sūpā Sentai)
- 2016: Kamen Rider 1 (仮面ライダー1号, Kamen Raidā Ichigō)
- 2021: Saber + Zenkaiger: Super Hero Senki (セイバー+ゼンカイジャー スーパーヒーロー戦記, Seibā Zenkaijā Sūpā Hīrō Senki)
- 2021: Kamen Rider: Beyond Generations (仮面ライダー ビヨンド・ジェネレーションズ, Kamen Raidā Biyondo Jenerēshonzu)
- 2023: Shin Kamen Rider

== S.I.C. Hero Saga ==
Published in Monthly Hobby Japan, the S.I.C. Hero Saga stories illustrated by S.I.C. figure dioramas portray stories featuring the characters from the Shotaro Ishinomori series. Kamen Rider has had three different stories: Missing Link, Special Episode: Escape (SPECIAL EPISODE -脱出-, Supesharu Episōdo Dasshutsu), and From Here to Eternity (ここより永遠に, Koko yori Towa ni). Missing Link ran in the July to October 2002 issues, From Here to Eternity was featured in the special issue HOBBY JAPAN MOOK S.I.C. OFFICIAL DIORAMA STORY S.I.C. HERO SAGA vol.1 Kakioroshi, and Special Episode: Escape was featured in the October 2006 issue of Hobby Japan.

New characters introduced during the Missing Link story are the twelve Shocker Riders (ショッカーライダー, Shokkā Raidā; each with different colored scarves) and the Shocker Tank (ショッカータンク, Shokkā Tanku).

Missing Link chapter titles

1. Infiltration (潜入, Sen'nyū)
2. Disappearance (失踪, Shissō)
3. Awakening (覚醒, Kakusei)
4. Puppet (傀儡, Kairai)

== Cast ==
- Takeshi Hongo: Hiroshi Fujioka (藤岡 弘, Fujioka Hiroshi) (Note: Although Hongo appears in episodes 9-13 and 66 and 67, Fujioka does not portray him. Due to his injury sustained during early filming, Rokurō Naya provided his voice, followed by Osamu Ichikawa when Fujioka disappeared due to trouble with his agency.)
- Hayato Ichimonji: Takeshi Sasaki (佐々木 剛, Sasaki Takeshi)
- Kazuya Taki: Jirō Chiba (千葉 治郎, Chiba Jirō)
- Tōbei Tachibana: Akiji Kobayashi (小林 昭二, Kobayashi Akiji)
- Ruriko Midorikawa: Chieko Maki (真樹 千恵子, Maki Chieko)
- Hiromi Nohara: Yoko Shimada (島田 陽子, Shimada Yōko)
- Shiro: Jō Honda (本田 じょう, Honda Jō)
- Yuri: Wakako Oki (沖 わか子, Oki Wakako)
- Mari: Linda Yamamoto (山本 リンダ, Yamamoto Rinda)
- Michi: Katsumi Nakajima (中島 かつみ, Nakajima Katsumi)
- Goro Ishikura: Yasuharu Miura (三浦 康晴, Miura Yasuharu)
- Emi: Emily Takami (高見 エミリー, Takami Emirī)
- Mika: Yōko Sugibayashi (杉林 陽子, Sugibayashi Yōko)
- Tokko: Machiko Nakajima (中島 真智子, Nakajima Machiko)
- Naoki: Tomonori Yazaki (矢崎 知紀, Tomonori Yazaki)
- Mitsuru: Yoshikazu Yamada (山田 芳一, Yamada Yoshikazu)
- Yokko: Yoshiko Nakada (中田 喜子, Nakada Yoshiko)
- Choko: Mimi Hagiwara (ミミ萩原, Hagiwara Mimi)
- Colonel Zol: Jirō Miyaguchi (宮口 二朗, Miyaguchi Jirō)
- Doctor Death: Hideyo Amamoto (天本 英世, Amamoto Hideyo)
- Ambassador Hell: Kenji Ushio (潮 健児, Ushio Kenji)
- General Black: Matasaburō Niwa (丹羽 又三郎, Niwa Matasaburō)

=== Voice cast ===
- Shocker/Gel-Shocker Leader: Gorō Naya (納谷 悟朗, Naya Gorō)
- Narrator: Shinji Nakae (中江 真司, Nakae Shinji) (Note: Nakae also narrated the next time trailers for the series. From episode 72, however, actors such as Gorō Naya intermittently stepped in.)

=== Suit cast ===
- Kamen Rider 1: Hiroshi Fujioka (藤岡邦弘, Fujioka Kunihiro), Masaru Okada (岡田勝, Okada Masaru), Tetsuya Nakayashiki (中屋敷哲也, Nakayashiki Tetsuya), Yuutarou Oosugi (大杉雄太郎, Oosugi Yuutarou)
- Kamen Rider 2: Tetsuya Nakayashiki (中屋敷哲也, Nakayashiki Tetsuya), Bunya Nakamura (中村文弥, Nakamura Bun'ya), Masaru Okada (岡田勝, Okada Masaru)

== International broadcasts ==
- In Thailand, the series first aired in 1971 on Channel 5, from September 7, 1971, with the title Red Ant Rampant.
- In the Philippines, Kamen Rider and Kamen Rider V3 were aired on RPN-9 under the title Kamen Rider from 1975 to 1977 with an English dub.
- In North America, Shout! Factory made the entire series available to stream in 2020.

== Staff ==
- Creator: Shotaro Ishinomori
- Scriptwriters: Masaru Igami, Shinichi Ichikawa, Masayuki Shimada, Mari Takizawa, Hisashi Yamazaki, Takao Nagaishi, Masahiro Tsukada, Ikurō Suzuki, Takeo Ōno, Fumio Ishimori, Kimiyuki Hasegawa, Kimio Hirayama, Minoru Yamada, Gorō Oketani, Shotaro Ishinomori
- Directors: Kōichi Takemoto, Itaru Orita, Hidetoshi Kitamura, Minoru Yamada, Issaku Uchida, Katsuhiko Taguchi, Masahiro Tsukada, Shotaro Ishinomori, Atsuo Okunaka
- Music: Shunsuke Kikuchi

== Songs ==
Opening themes

- "Let's Go!! Rider Kick" (レッツゴー!!ライダーキック, Rettsu Gō!! Raidā Kikku)
  - Lyrics: Shotaro Ishinomori
  - Composition & Arrangement: Shunsuke Kikuchi
  - Artist: Hiroshi Fujioka / Masato Shimon (as Koichi Fuji) & Male Harmony (メール・ハーモニー, Mēru Hāmonī)
  - Episodes: 1–13 (Fujioka), 14–88 (Fuji)
- "Rider Action" (ライダーアクション, Raidā Akushon)
  - Lyrics: Shotaro Ishinomori
  - Composition & Arrangement: Shunsuke Kikuchi
  - Artist: Masato Shimon
  - Episodes: 89–98

Ending themes

- "Kamen Rider no Uta" (仮面ライダーの歌, Kamen Raidā no Uta; "The Song of Kamen Rider")
  - Lyrics: Saburō Yatsude
  - Composition & Arrangement: Shunsuke Kikuchi
  - Artist: Koichi Fuji, Male Harmony
  - Episodes: 1–71
- "Rider Action"
  - Lyrics: Shotaro Ishinomori
  - Composition & Arrangement: Shunsuke Kikuchi
  - Artist: Masato Shimon
  - Episodes: 72–88
- "Lonely Kamen Rider" (ロンリー仮面ライダー, Ronrī Kamen Raidā)
  - Lyrics: Mamoru Tanaka
  - Composition & Arrangement: Shunsuke Kikuchi
  - Artist: Masato Shimon
  - Episodes: 89–98

== Legacy ==
The Kamen Rider original series famously spearheaded launched the "Second Kaiju Boom" or "Henshin Boom" on Japanese television in the early 1970s, greatly impacting the superhero and action-adventure genre in Japan. The famous "henshin sequence", in which the title hero performs ritualistic poses and shouting a keyword to transform into his superhero form has since become a staple in Japanese pop-culture, inspiring superheroes, and magical girl genres. Kamen Rider went later produce a great number of spin-offs which remain in production today. Several Kamen Rider series were aired in Japan after the first Kamen Rider finished. After Kamen Rider Black RX ended production in 1989, the series was put on hold.

There were three movies released as the 1990s "Movie Riders", which were Shin Kamen Rider: Prologue, Kamen Rider ZO and Kamen Rider J. After the original creator Shōtarō Ishinomori's death in 1998, the Kamen Rider franchise continued in 2000 with Kamen Rider Kuuga. As of 2025, thirty-six Kamen Rider series have been made, with the newest being Kamen Rider ZEZTZ which premiered in September 2025.

As of 2005, a remake of the Kamen Rider series in the Heisei era was made and reimagined with Kamen Rider The First and continued with Kamen Rider The Next released in 2007.

The cultural impact of the series in Japan resulted in astronomer Akimasa Nakamura naming two minor planets in honor of the series: 12408 Fujioka, after actor Hiroshi Fujioka, known for his portrayal of Takeshi Hongo/Kamen Rider 1, and 12796 Kamenrider, after the series itself.

As of 2021, starting from Kamen Rider: Beyond Generations, Hiroshi Fujioka's son, Maito portrays Takeshi Hongo's younger self.

As of 2023, another remake of the Kamen Rider series in the Reiwa era was made and reimagined with Shin Kamen Rider.
