= Tetsuya Nakayashiki =

Japanese actor and stuntman

- 中屋敷哲也
- Born: May 6, 1948 (age 78). Kuji, Iwate Prefecture, Japan
- Citizenship: Japanese

Tetsuya Nakayashiki (Japanese: 中屋敷哲也, Hepburn: Nakayashiki Tetsuya) is a Japanese actor, suit actor and stuntman. He is known for appearing in a large number of Kamen Rider productions in the Showa era.

== Biography ==
Nakayashiki was born Iwate Prefecture. When he was 17 he moved to Tokyo to become an actor and joined Oono Kenyuukai, a group of stuntmen, as one of its first members. As a stunt actor he often wore the Kamen Rider suits during action, Kamen Rider V3's face actor Hiroshi Miyauchi recalled in an interview in 2024 that he was not allowed to take photos with Nakayashiki during filming. Despite this Miyauchi asked Nakayashiki to portray the hero as cool as possible During the production of Skyrider, the lead actor Hiroaki Murakami would stay at Nakayashiki's house. He became famous for being the suit actor for all the Showa Kamen Riders till Kamen Rider Black. He currently mostly works on stage. In 2025 he reunited with his old colleagues for a talk event.

== Filmography ==
- Mighty Jack (1968) - (episode 12)
- Key Hunter (1970) - (episode 96)
- Kamen Rider (1971 TV series) - (1971) - Kamen Rider 1, Kamen Rider 2
- Chōjin Barom-1 (1972) - Barom-1
- Kamen Rider vs. Shocker (1972) - Kamen Rider 1
- Kamen Rider V3 (1973) - Kamen Rider V3
- Inazuman (1973) - (episode 18)
- Kamen Rider X (1974) - Kamen Rider X
- Inazuman (1974) - (episode 3)
- Kamen Rider Amazon (1974) - Kamen Rider Amazon
- ESPY (film) (1974) - Ulrov's subordinate
- Himitsu Sentai Gorenger (1975) - Aoranger, Iron Man Mask General Temujin
- Kamen Rider Stronger (1975) - Kamen Rider Stronger
- Space Ironman Kyodain (1976) - (episode 36)
- Daitetsujin 17 (1977)
- Spider-Man (Japanese TV series) (1978) - (episode 39)
- Battle Fever J (1979) - (episode 16)
- Skyrider (1979) - Skyrider
- Tantei Monogatari (1980) - (episode 19)
- Kamen Rider Super-1 (1980) - Kamen Rider Super-1
- Dai Sentai Goggle-V (1982) - (episode 9)
- Space Sheriff Sharivan (1983) - (episode 37)
- Birth of the 10th! Kamen Riders All Together!! (1984) - Eisuke Mikage
- Sanga Moyu (1984) - Private First Class Kusano
- Nebula Mask Machineman (1984) - (episode 3)
- Kamen Rider Agito (2001) - Motorcycle shop owner
