= Field of Dreams (disambiguation) =

Field of Dreams is a 1989 American drama-sports-fantasy film.

Field of Dreams may also refer to:

== Places ==
- Field of Dreams (Dubuque County, Iowa), baseball field and pop-culture tourist attraction built originally for the 1989 movie of the same name

== Events ==
- MLB at Field of Dreams, a recurring Major League Baseball game played at the Field of Dreams complex in Dubuque County, Iowa

== Music ==
- "Field of Dreams" (song), a 1997 song by Force & Styles
- "Field of Dreams", a song by Do As Infinity from their 2004 album 8
- "Field of Dreams", a song by Low Roar as the lead single from their 2025 album House in the Woods

== See also ==
- The Dreaming Fields (album), a 2011 album by Matraca Berg
  - "The Dreaming Fields", a song from the like-named album
- "Field of Hopes and Dreams", a track from Deltarune Chapter 1 OST
- In the Fields of Dreams, a 1940 Finnish drama film
- Our Field of Dreams, a Japanese manga series published in the 1990s
