= Kamen Rider V3 =

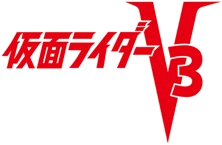
- Genre: Tokusatsu; Superhero fiction Science fiction Action/Adventure; Fantasy
- Created by: Shotaro Ishinomori
- Developed by: Masaru Igami
- Directed by: Minoru Yamada
- Starring: Hiroshi Miyauchi; Hizuru Ono; Hideki Kawaguchi; Akiji Kobayashi; Takehisa Yamaguchi
- Narrated by: Shinji Nakae
- Music by: Shunsuke Kikuchi
- Country of origin: Japan
- No. of episodes: 52

Production
- Running time: 20–25 minutes
- Production companies: Ishimori Productions; Toei Company; Mainichi Broadcasting System

Original release
- Network: ANN (MBS, NET)
- Release: February 17, 1973 – February 9, 1974

Related
- Kamen Rider; Kamen Rider X

Kamen Rider V3 (仮面ライダーV3, Kamen Raidā Bui Surī) is a Japanese tokusatsu television series. It is the second installment in the popular Kamen Rider Series, and the direct sequel to the original Kamen Rider. It was a production of Toei, and was shown on Mainichi Broadcasting System and NET from February 17, 1973, to February 9, 1974.

Every episode of Kamen Rider V3 begins with the following opening narration: "Kamen Rider V3, Shiro Kazami, is an altered human. Mortally wounded by Destron, he is rebuilt by Kamen Riders 1 and 2, reborn as Kamen Rider V3."

== Plot ==
Starting after the events of the original series, Shiro Kazami witnesses a murder by Destron, a new organization created from Gel-Shocker by its previously thought deceased leader. They attempt to kill Shiro and later kill his family. With this, Shiro begs Takeshi Hongo and Hayato Ichimonji to turn him into a Kamen Rider. Although they initially declined, after he sacrificed himself to save them, they had no choice. After turning Shiro into Kamen Rider V3, the Double Riders sacrifice themselves to save Tokyo. Shiro then must fight Destron in Japan with the help of Tobei Tachibana, the Kamen Rider Kid Corps, and later the Double Riders, revealed to have survived and left to fight Destron in other countries. Towards the end of his war, Shiro is joined by ex-Destron scientist Joji Yuki a.k.a. the Riderman. Eventually, Joji sacrificed himself to save Japan and thus Shiro named him Kamen Rider #4. During the final battle, Shiro stopped Destron's leader and the organization as a whole, saving the world from its reign of terror, but their leader still survived, meaning someday more of his forces could appear to enact his will. (Note: Although the Great Leader does not appear in Kamen Rider X, it is revealed in Kamen Rider Stronger that he was secretly behind the organization in that series.)

== Characters ==
=== Kamen Riders ===
- Shiro Kazami (風見 志郎, Kazami Shirō): A young college student and sole survivor of his family who fights Destron as the cyborg Kamen Rider V3 ("V3" or "Rider V3", for short). He is host to 26 special powers that he uses to fight Destron, most of which are revealed during the course of the series. Among his powers are Bulletproof Muscles, the V3 Hopper (a device that allows him to track enemies) and the V3 Reverse Kick. Others, including the V3 Thunder (one of his most powerful), were revealed in stage shows, manga and magazines of the time. His nuclear-powered motorcycle is named "Hurricane" (ハリケーン, Harikēn); it also has a variety of special abilities.
- Jōji Yūki (結城 丈二, Yūki Jōji): A Destron scientist who is betrayed by General Yoroi. His right arm is burnt off and replaced by a special mechanical one, which gives him special powers to fight General Yoroi as Riderman (ライダーマン, Raidāman). Initially, he distrusts V3, but eventually becomes an ally. V3 declares him to be "Kamen Rider Number Four" in tribute, after sacrificing his life to protect Tokyo from destruction. Riderman appears alive in some of the sequels. How he survived is not fully explained in the TV show, but it is explained in detail in the Kamen Rider Spirits manga.

=== Allies ===
- Tobei Tachibana (立花 藤兵衛, Tachibana Tōbei): Shiro's mentor and advisor. This character appeared in the original Kamen Rider and also appeared in the following three series.
- Junko Tama (珠 純子, Tama Junko): A young woman who has a crush on Shiro. Shiro is aware of her crush, but refuses to let her get close to him to protect her, because he lives such a dangerous life. Despite this, she assists Shiro, often watching the communications station, and eventually becomes a close friend to Shiro. She often gets into dangerous situations, requiring V3 to rescue her.
- Shigeru Tama (珠 シゲル, Tama Shigeru): Junko's kid brother and a member of the Boys' Kamen Rider Squad. He sometimes acts as Shiro's liaison with the Boys' Kamen Rider members.
- The Boys' Kamen Rider members (少年仮面ライダー隊, Shōnen Kamen Raidā Tai): Also known as The Kamen Rider Scouts, an organization of young boys who assist Kamen Rider V3. They have members throughout Japan. They wear medallions which are shaped like the head of V3 and contain radios, which allow them to report suspicious activity to Kamen Rider headquarters.
- Ken Sakuma (佐久間 ケン, Sakuma Ken): A Destron Hunter from Interpol, who helps V3 for a few episodes. He is Destron Hunter no. 5 and becomes the last to survive.
- Tadokoro (田所): Joji Yuki's father figure and mentor who is an important character in the PlayStation 2-exclusive survival action horror game Kamen Rider Seigi no Keifu. He was a professor of Destron who wanted to use his research for what he believed to be for the sake of mankind.

=== Destron ===
Destron (デストロン, Desutoron) is an international terrorist organization bent on conquering the world. Destron was formed under the lead of the mysterious Great Leader by surviving members of Gelshocker. Although Destron had branches in every country and sought to dominate the entire planet, its main headquarters was in Japan which Destron focused its attention on. Initially the monsters of the organization followed the orders of the unseen Destron Leader without any direct supervision, but after repeated failures of the monsters the Destron Leader summoned Doctor G from Destron's German Division to take charge of the day-to-day operations of Destron's Japanese Division. Destron is the only Showa villainous organization in the franchise to not appear in the movie OOO, Den-O, All Riders: Let's Go Kamen Riders although several of its monsters make appearances; this is most likely due to the organization being formed from Shocker remnants, therefore making its construction unnecessary. Their name is also reused as the Japanese name of the Decepticon faction from the Transformers franchise.

- Destron Leader (デストロン首領, Desutoron Shuryō) - Another form of the Shocker Leader from the original series, originally thought to have died in a failed kamikaze attack against Kamen Riders One and Two. In the earliest episodes he led directly; later he let one of his generals lead for him. His cyborgs are patterned after a combination of a manmade object and an animal (such as Camera Mosquito or Bazooka Turtle). In the final episode, he was revealed to be a monstrous skeleton with a living heart, calling himself God of Death. Immediately afterwards, the Destron headquarters self-destructed, but V3 escaped.
- Doctor G (ドクトルG, Dokutoru Gē) / Kani Laser (カニレーザー, Kani Rēzā) - Destron's first general in knight armor from Germany in charge of Japan. In the comics, his scorpion-shaped helmet could transform into a deadly scorpion, but this did not happen on TV. Most of his Destron Inhumanoids are cyborgs that are the same type as Destron Leader's cyborgs. After numerous failures, Doctor G summoned the spirits of his dead evil warriors to transform him into Kani Laser for his final battle with Kamen Rider V3. Despite putting up a heroic battle, he was destroyed by V3's V3 Tailspin Return Kick.
- Baron Kiba (キバ男爵, Kiba Danshaku) / Vampiric Mammoth (吸血マンモス, Kyūketsu Manmosu) - The leopard-skin wearing witch doctor from Africa, second general of Destron, and leader of the Kiba Clan. He wields a spear which could fire explosive charges. The Destron Inhumanoids in his Kiba Clan are mutated forms of wild animals with fangs or tusks that are empowered through blood sacrifices of innocent victims by Baron Kiba. After his Kiba Clan was wiped out by Kamen Rider V3, Baron Kiba later called on the spirits of Doovoo to give him the power to transform into the Vampiric Mammoth so that he could take revenge on V3 in his final battle. He was destroyed by V3's V3 Revolving Triple Kick.
- Archbishop Tsubasa (ツバサ大僧正, Tsubasa Dai Sōjō) / Shibito Bat (死人コウモリ, Shibito Kōmori) - The robe-wearing general from Tibet. The Destron Inhumanoids in his Wing Unit are typically mutated versions of flying animals. Archbishop Tsubasa later takes on his true form called Zombie Bat in his final battle with Kamen Rider V3. He was destroyed by V3's V3 Mach Kick. General Yoroi later revived Archbishop Tsubasa's Zombie Bat form in order to ambush Kamen Rider V3. He was defeated by V3 with several punches.
- General Yoroi (ヨロイ元帥, Yoroi Gensui) / Zariganna (ザリガーナ, Zarigāna) - Destron's final general in plated armor who comes from Mongolia. Most of his Destron Inhumanoids in his Armored Division are mutated versions of armored animals. He frames scientist Joji Yuki for treason, fearing his position in Destron is in jeopardy, creating a rival in Riderman. General Yoroi became the crayfish monster Zariganna in his final battle against Kamen Rider V3. After being defeated by Kamen Rider V3, Zariganna was destroyed by the Destron Leader for failing. In Kamen Rider Spirits, he is restored in a new Crab Inhumanoid body and seeks to eliminate his former rival Riderman. He was ultimately destroyed by Riderman's Machine Gun Arm.
- Destron Combatmen (デストロン戦闘員, Desutoron Sentōin) - Destron has an apparently limitless supply of soldiers. They wear identical black, masked uniforms with a white scorpion design. Doctor G's Soldiers wield knives, Baron Fang's Soldiers wield fang-shaped weapons, and Archbishop Wing's Soldiers wear robes similar to his unless they're in combat.
  - Destron Racer Hell Corps (レーサー地獄部隊, Rēsā Jigoku Butai) - Motorcycle riders that were turned into Destron servants by Lens Ant. They were assigned to kill Shiro Kazami.
  - Destron Ranger Corps (レインジャー部隊, Reinjā Butai) - Destron Legionnaires that received special training from Mantis Boomerang. After Mantis Boomerang was destroyed, they worked with Heater Cicada.
  - Destron Autobike Corps (オートバイ部隊, Ōtobai Butai) - They appeared only in episode 27.
  - Destron Combatwomen (女戦闘員, On'na Sentōin): The female counterparts of the Destron Combatants who appeared only in episode 41.
- Destron Scientists (科学者戦闘員, Kagakusha Sentōin) - The scientists who are loyal to Destron. They appear similar to Destron soldiers, but their masks and uniforms are white, with red print, instead of black with white print. They wear white lab coats over their uniforms. They are rarely found outside of a Destron base. Joji Yuki was a former Destron Scientist.
- Destron Leader's Bodyguards (首領親衛隊, Shuryō Shineitai) - They look like normal Destron soldiers, but they wear a brown military uniform over their Destron uniform that makes them resemble Nazi stormtroopers. Elite troops, they were able to give V3 a hard fight as he made his way to confront the Destron Leader.

==== Destron Kaijin ====
Destron's Kaijins are sorted into different groups:

- The Mechanical Army (機械合成怪人, Kikai Gōsei Kaijin) are a group of Destron Kaijins that were first used by the Destron Leader and later led by Doctor G. Doctor G creates the monsters under his command using black magic and technological science. They are cyborgs that resemble a fusion between an animal and an item.
  - Scissors Jaguar (ハサミジャガー, Hasami Jagā): A jaguar monster who uses his scissors-bladed hands.
  - Turtle Bazooka (カメバズーカ, Kame Bazūka): A turtle monster with a bazooka on its shell.
  - Squid Fire (イカファイア, Ika Faia) - A squid monster with two propane tanks on its back. Destroyed by V3's V3 Centrifugal Kick.
  - TV Fly (テレビバエ, Terebi Bae) - A fly monster with 2 televisions for eyes.
  - Machine Gun Snake (マシンガンスネーク, Mashingan Sunēku) - A cobra monster with a snake-headed machine gun for a lower right arm.
  - Hammer Jellyfish (ハンマークラゲ, Hanmā Kurage) - A jellyfish monster with a hammer for a right hand.
  - Knife Armadillo (ナイフアルマジロ, Naifu Arumajiro) - An armadillo monster with a knife for a right hand.
  - Chainsaw Lizard (ノコギロトカゲ, Nokogiri Tokage) - A lizard monster with a chainsaw for a right hand. Destroyed by V3's V3 Double Attack.
  - Lens Ant (レンズアリ, Renzu Ari) - An ant monster with glasses lens for eyes. Destroyed by V3's V3 Tailspin Kick.
  - Razor Sea Star (カミソリヒトデ, Kamisori Hitode) - A starfish with a sword blade for a left hand. Destroyed by V3's V3 Tailspin Kick.
  - Pickel Shark (ピッケルシャーク, Pikkeru Shāku) - A shark monster with an ice pick for a right hand. Destroyed by V3's V3 Return Kick.
  - Drill Mole (ドリルモグラ, Doriru Mogura) - A mole monster with a drill for a nose.
  - Magnet Boar (ジシャクイノシシ, Jishaku Inoshishi) - A wild boar monster with a magnet for a left hand.
  - Toad Boiler (ガマボイラー, Gama Boirā) - A toad monster with a boiler for a torso.
  - Burner Bat (バーナーコウモリ, Bānā Kōmori) - A burnt-winged bat monster with a gas burner tube in its mouth.
  - Missile Gecko (ミサイルヤモリ, Misairu Yamori) - A gecko monster with a missile on its back.
  - Spray Mouse (スプレーネズミ, Supurē Nezumi) - A mouse monster with a spray gun on its right arm.
  - Chain-Sickle Coccinellidae (クサリガマテントウ, Kusarigama Tentō) - A ladybug monster with a chain-sickle for a left hand.
  - Porcupinefish Apache (ハリフグアパッチ, Harifugu Apatchi) - A porcupinefish monster with a torpedo launcher on its left shoulder.
  - Guillotine Dinosaur (ギロチンザウルス, Girochin Zaurusu) - A dinosaur monster of indeterminate species with a small guillotine for a right hand.
  - Syringe Spider (ドクバリグモ, Dokubari Gumo) - A spider monster with a syringe for a right hand.
  - Speargun Sea Lion (ウォーターガントド, Wōtāgan Todo) - A sea lion monster with a speargun for a left hand.
  - Cannon Buffalo (タイホウバッファロー, Taihō Baffarō; Movie) - A buffalo monster with cannons on its shoulders. Destroyed by Kamen Rider #1 and #2's Rider Double Kick and V3's V3 Kick.
  - Propeller Rhinoceros Beetle (プロペラカブト, Puropera Kabuto) - A rhinoceros beetle monster with a propeller for a right hand.
  - Cockroach Spike (ゴキブリスパイク, Gokiburi Supaiku) - A cockroach monster with a spikey device for a right hand.
  - Mantis Boomerang (カマキリメラン, Kamakiri Meran) - A mantis monster.
  - Heater Cicada (ヒーターゼミ, Hītā Zemi) - A cicada monster with electric heaters for eyes.
  - Quoit Stag Beetle (ワナゲクワガタ, Wanage Kuwagata) - A stag beetle monster that throws rings.
- The Fang Tribe (キバ一族, Kiba Ichizoku) is the Destron Kaijin group led by Baron Fang that is composed of tusked or fanged animals. Its members were cultists practicing an evil magic called Doovoo (not to be confused with Voodoo magic).
  - Skull Warthog (ドクロイノシシ, Dokuro Inoshishi) - A warthog monster.
  - Will-o'-the Wisp Walrus (鬼火セイウチ, Onibi Seiuchi) - A walrus monster.
  - Snow Wolf (ユキオオカミ, Yuki Ōkami) - A cryokinetic wolf monster.
  - Primordial Tiger (原始タイガー, Genshi Taigā) - A smilodon monster.
- The Wing Unit (ツバサ一族, Tsubasa Ichizoku) is the Destron Kaijin group led by Archbishop Wing that is composed of winged animals except for one plant-like monster. The Wing Unit is an ancient cult of vampires.
  - Flame Condor (火炎コンドル, Kaen Kondoru) - A condor monster.
  - Kodama Flying Squirrel (木霊ムササビ, Kodama Musasabi) - A flying squirrel monster.
  - Murderous Dokugahra (殺人ドクガーラ, Satsujin Dokugāra) - A moth monster.
  - Man-Eating Banana Plant (人喰いバショウガン, Hitokui Bashō Gan) - A banana plant monster.
- The Armored Division (ヨロイ一族, Yoroi Ichizoku) is the Destron Kaijin group led by General Yoroi that is composed of armored animals. They are the most powerful monsters used by Destron.
  - Garumazillon (ガルマジロン, Garumajiron) - An armadillo monster.
  - Katatsublar (カタツブラー, Katatsuburā) - A snail monster.
  - Sickle-Neck Turtle (カマクビガメ, Kamakubi Game) - A turtle monster that can extend his neck.
  - Rhinoceros Tank (サイタンク, Sai Tanku) - A rhinoceros monster.
  - Coelacanth Kid (シーラカンスキッド, Shīrakansu Kiddo) - A coelacanth monster.
  - Thorned Starfish (オニヒトデ, Oni Hitode) - A starfish monster.
  - Chameleon (カメレオン, Kamereon) - A chameleon monster. He was later remodeled into Vampire Chameleon (吸血カメレオン, Kyūketsu Kamereon) by General Yoroi who possesses blood-sucking ability and a camouflage that can conceal his shadow. Vampire Chameleon was destroyed by Kamen Rider V3's Rider Kick.

=== Returning characters ===
The following characters return from Kamen Rider:

- Takeshi Hongo/Kamen Rider 1
- Hayato Ichimonji/Kamen Rider 2
- Colonel Zol
- Doctor Death
- Ambassador Hell
- General Black

== Episodes ==
| No. | Title | Directed by | Written by | Original release date |
|---|---|---|---|---|
| 1 | "Rider No. 3: His Name is V3!"; Transliteration: "Raidā Sangō Sono Na wa Bui Surī!" (Japanese: ライダー３号 その名はV3！) | Minoru Yamada | Masaru Igami | February 17, 1973 |
| 2 | "Last Testament of the Double Riders"; Transliteration: "Daburu Raidā no Yuigonjō" (Japanese: ダブルライダーの遺言状) | Minoru Yamada | Masaru Igami | February 24, 1973 |
| 3 | "The Execution of V3"; Transliteration: "Shikeidai no Bui Surī" (Japanese: 死刑台のV3) | Atsuo Okunaka | Masaru Igami | March 3, 1973 |
| 4 | "V3's 26 Secrets!?"; Transliteration: "Buisurī no Nijūroku no Himitsu!?" (Japanese: V3の２６の秘密！？) | Atsuo Okunaka | Masaru Igami | March 10, 1973 |
| 5 | "Snake-Man with a Machine Gun!"; Transliteration: "Kikanjū o Motta Hebi Ningen!" (Japanese: 機関銃を持ったヘビ人間) | Masahiro Tsukada | Ikuro Suzuki | March 17, 1973 |
| 6 | "Enter, Hammer-Jellyfish! V3 Unleash Your Killing Technique!!"; Transliteration: "Hanmā Kurage Shutsugen! Hanate Bui Surī no Hissatsu-waza!!" (Japanese: ハンマークラゲ出現! 放てV3の必殺わざ！！) | Masahiro Tsukada | Ikuro Suzuki | March 24, 1973 |
| 7 | "The Fury of Rider V3's Special Training"; Transliteration: "Raidā Bui Surī Ikari no Tokkun" (Japanese: ライダーV3 怒りの特訓) | Minoru Yamada | Masayuki Shimada | March 31, 1973 |
| 8 | "Watch Out, V3! Beware the Terrifying Buzzsaw"; Transliteration: "Ayaushi Bui Surī! Semaru Denki Nokogiri no Kyōfu" (Japanese: 危うしV3！迫る電気ノコギリの恐怖) | Minoru Yamada | Masayuki Shimada | April 7, 1973 |
| 9 | "What is the Destron Hell Squad!?"; Transliteration: "Desutoron, Jigoku Butai to wa Nani ka!?" (Japanese: デストロン、地獄部隊とは何か！？) | Katsuhiko Taguchi | Makoto Naito; Toshimichi Seaki | April 14, 1973 |
| 10 | "Secret of the Double Typhoon"; Transliteration: "Daburu Taifūn no Himitsu" (Japanese: ダブルタイフーンの秘密) | Katsuhiko Taguchi | Makoto Naito; Toshimichi Seaki | April 21, 1973 |
| 11 | "The Claws of Evil Reach Out for V3!!"; Transliteration: "Akuma no Tsume ga Bui Surī o Nerau!" (Japanese: 悪魔の爪がV3をねらう！！) | Masahiro Tsukada | Ikuro Suzuki | April 28, 1973 |
| 12 | "Junko Becomes a Mutant's Bride?!"; Transliteration: "Junko ga Kaijin no Hanayome ni!?" (Japanese: 純子が怪人の花嫁に！？) | Masahiro Tsukada | Ikuro Suzuki | May 5, 1973 |
| 13 | "Terrifying Commandant: Doktor G!!"; Transliteration: "Kyōfu no Daikanbu Dokutoru Gē!" (Japanese: 恐怖の大幹部ドクトル・ゲー！) | Minoru Yamada | Masaru Igami | April 28, 1973 |
| 14 | "Secret Memento of the Double Riders"; Transliteration: "Daburu Raidā Himitsu no Katami" (Japanese: ダブルライダー秘密のかたみ) | Minoru Yamada | Masaru Igami | May 19, 1973 |
| 15 | "Rider V3's Deadly Weakness!!"; Transliteration: "Raidā Bui Surī Shi no Jakuten!!" (Japanese: ライダーV3 死の弱点！！) | Masahiro Tsukada | Masaru Igami | May 26, 1973 |
| 16 | "The Missile-Carrying Gecko Inhumanoid!"; Transliteration: "Misairu o Seotta Yamori Kaijin!" (Japanese: ミサイルを背負ったヤモリ怪人！) | Masahiro Tsukada | Ikuro Suzuki | June 2, 1973 |
| 17 | "The Devil Spray is the Reaper's Weapon"; Transliteration: "Debiru Supurē wa Shinigami no Buki" (Japanese: デビルスプレーは死神の武器) | Katsuhiko Taguchi | Masayuki Shimada | June 9, 1973 |
| 18 | "V3, Beware the Evil Traitor!"; Transliteration: "Akuma no Uragiri Ayaushi Bui Surī!" (Japanese: 悪魔の裏切り あやうしV3！) | Katsuhiko Taguchi | Masayuki Shimada | June 16, 1973 |
| 19 | "Blowfish-Apache's Operation Torpedo!!"; Transliteration: "Harifugu Apatchi no Gyorai Sakusen!!" (Japanese: Harifugu Apatchi no Gyorai Sakusen!!) | Masahiro Tsukada | Mari Takizawa | June 23, 1973 |
| 20 | "Destron's Shikoku Conquest Operation"; Transliteration: "Desutoron Shikoku Senryō Sakusen" (Japanese: デストロン四国占領作戦) | Minoru Yamada | Masaru Igami | June 30, 1973 |
| 21 | "The Double Riders Live"; Transliteration: "Ikiteita Daburu Raidā" (Japanese: 生きていたダブルライダー) | Minoru Yamada | Masaru Igami | July 7, 1973 |
| 22 | "Camp of Terror! Mystery of the Underground Canal"; Transliteration: "Kyōfu no Kyanpu! Chitei Unga no Nazo!" (Japanese: 恐怖のキャンプ！地底運河のなぞ!) | Masahiro Tsukada | Masayuki Shimada; Masahiro Tsukada | July 14, 1973 |
| 23 | "Terror! Vampire From the Graveyard"; Transliteration: "Kaiki! Hakaba Kara Kita Kyūketsu Otoko" (Japanese: 怪奇！墓場から来た吸血男) | Minoru Yamada | Ikuro Suzuki | July 21, 1973 |
| 24 | "Mysterious! Cockroach Manor!!"; Transliteration: "Kaiki! Gokiburi Yashiki!!" (Japanese: 怪奇！ゴキブリ屋敷！！) | Minoru Yamada | Mari Takizawa | July 28, 1973 |
| 25 | "Mysterious!! The Destron Ranger Corps"; Transliteration: "Kaiki!! Desutoron, Reinjā Butai" (Japanese: 怪奇！！デストロン、レインジャー部隊) | Masahiro Tsukada | Masaru Igami | August 4, 1973 |
| 26 | "Inhumanoid Heater-Cicada's Mummy Operation!!"; Transliteration: "Kaijin Hītā Zemi no Miira Sakusen" (Japanese: 怪人ヒーターゼミのミイラ作戦) | Masahiro Tsukada | Masaru Igami | August 11, 1973 |
| 27 | "Zol, Death, Hell & Black Rise from the Grave"; Transliteration: "Ikikaetta Zoru - Shinigami - Jigoku - Burakku" (Japanese: 生きかえったゾル・死神・地獄・ブラック) | Minoru Yamada | Masaru Igami | August 18, 1973 |
| 28 | "The Five Commandants' All-Out Attack!!"; Transliteration: "Go Daikanbu no Sōkōgeki!" (Japanese: 五大幹部の総攻撃！) | Minoru Yamada | Masaru Igami | August 25, 1973 |
| 29 | "Doktor G's Final Challenge!"; Transliteration: "Dokutoru Gē Saigo no Chōsen!" (Japanese: ドクトル・ゲー最後の挑戦！) | Masahiro Tsukada | Masaru Igami | September 1, 1973 |
| 30 | "Doktor G! The True Form of Evil is...?" Transliteration: "Dokutoru Gē! Akuma no Shōtai wa?" (Japanese: ドクトル・ゲー！悪魔の正体は？) | Masahiro Tsukada | Masaru Igami | September 8, 1973 |
| 31 | "Enter, Baron Tusk: Commandant of Curses!!"; Transliteration: "Noroi no Daikanbu Kiba-danshaku Shutsugen!!" (Japanese: 呪いの大幹部キバ男爵出現！！) | Itaru Orita | Masaru Igami | September 15, 1973 |
| 32 | "Spectre of Onibi Swamp: Rider Scouts Annihilated!?"; Transliteration: "Onibi Numa no Kai Raidā Tai Zenmetsu!?" (Japanese: 鬼火沼の怪 ライダー隊全滅！？) | Itaru Orita | Masaru Igami | September 22, 1973 |
| 33 | "V3 in Danger! Riders 1 and 2 Return!!"; Transliteration: "Bui Surī Ayaushi! Kaetekita Raidā Ichigō, Nigō!!" (Japanese: V3危うし！帰ってきたライダー１号、２号！！) | Masahiro Tsukada | Ikuro Suzuki | September 29, 1973 |
| 34 | "Critical Moment! Baron Tusk vs. The Three Riders!!"; Transliteration: "Kikiippatsu! Kiba-danshaku Tai Sannin Raidā!!" (Japanese: 危機一髪！キバ男爵対三人ライダー！！) | Masahiro Tsukada | Ikuro Suzuki | October 6, 1973 |
| 35 | "Baron Tusk's Final Transformation"; Transliteration: "Kiba-danshaku Saigo no Henshin" (Japanese: キバ男爵最後の変身) | Issaku Uchida | Masaru Igami | October 13, 1973 |
| 36 | "The Winged Corps: Demons of the Sky"; Transliteration: "Sora no Majin Tsubasa Gundan" (Japanese: 空の魔神 ツバサ軍団) | Issaku Uchida | Masaru Igami | October 20, 1973 |
| 37 | "Mysterious Temple: Curse of the Musasabi Clan!"; Transliteration: "Ayashi no Tera Musasabi Zoku no Noroi!" (Japanese: 怪しの寺 ムササビ族の呪い！) | Itaru Orita | Mari Takizawa | October 27, 1973 |
| 38 | "Lone V3 and Cub: Deadly Skydiving!"; Transliteration: "Kotsure Bui Surī Shi no Sukaidaibingu" (Japanese: 子連れV3 死のスカイダイビング) | Itaru Orita | Ikuro Suzuki | November 3, 1973 |
| 39 | "Terror of the Carnivorous Fauna!!"; Transliteration: "Hitokui Shokubutsu Bashōgan no Kyōfu!!" (Japanese: 人喰い植物 バショウガンの恐怖！！) | Issaku Uchida | Tooru Hirayama; Seiji Abe | November 10, 1973 |
| 40 | "Sudden Death! V3 Mach Kick!!"; Transliteration: "Hissatsu! Bui Surī Mahha Kikku!!" (Japanese: 必殺！V3マッハキック！！) | Issaku Uchida | Tooru Hirayama; Seiji Abe | November 17, 1973 |
| 41 | "Oh! People Are Melting! Enter, General Armor"; Transliteration: "Ā! Ningen ga Tokeru! Yoroi-gensui Tōjō" (Japanese: あッ！人間が溶ける！ヨロイ元帥登場) | Itaru Orita | Tooru Hirayama; Seiji Abe | November 24, 1973 |
| 42 | "The Snail-Man's Human Experiments!"; Transliteration: "Katatsumuri ningen no jintaijikken!" (Japanese: カタツムリ人間の人体実験！) | Itaru Orita | Tooru Hirayama; Seiji Abe | December 1, 1973 |
| 43 | "Friend of Foe? The Mysterious Riderma"; Transliteration: "Teki ka Mikata ka? Nazo no Raidāūman" (Japanese: 敵か味方か？謎のライダーウーマン) | Issaku Uchida | Masaru Igami | December 8, 1973 |
| 44 | "V3 Versus Riderman"; Transliteration: "Bui Surī Tai Raidāūman" (Japanese: V3対ライダーウーマン) | Issaku Uchida | Masaru Igami | December 15, 1973 |
| 45 | "Destron's Christmas Present"; Transliteration: "Desutoron no Ekkusumasu Purezento" (Japanese: デストロンのＸマスプレゼント) | Itaru Orita | Ikuro Suzuki | December 22, 1973 |
| 46 | "Riderman, Where Will You Go?"; Transliteration: "Raidāman yo Doko e Yuku?" (Japanese: ライダーマンよどこへゆく？) | Itaru Orita | Ikuro Suzuki | December 29, 1973 |
| 47 | "Ambush! The Destron Leader!!"; Transliteration: "Machibuse! Desutoron Shuryō!!" (Japanese: 待ち伏せ！デストロン首領！！) | Itaru Orita | Masaru Igami | January 5, 1974 |
| 48 | "Look! The Face of the Destron Leader!!"; Transliteration: "Mita! Desutoron Shuryō no Kao!!" (Japanese: 見た！デストロン首領の顔！！) | Itaru Orita | Tooru Hirayama; Seiji Abe | January 12, 1974 |
| 49 | "A Gunshot Rings Out! Shiro Kazami Falls!!"; Transliteration: "Jūsei Ippatsu! Kazami Shirō Taoru!!" (Japanese: 銃声一発！風見志郎倒る！！) | Issaku Uchida | Takao Nagaishi | January 19, 1974 |
| 50 | "A Little Friendship"; Transliteration: "Chiisa na Yūjō" (Japanese: 小さな友情) | Issaku Uchida | Kimio Hirayama | January 26, 1974 |
| 51 | "You are Kamen Rider 4!!"; Transliteration: "Raidā Yongō wa Kimi da!!" (Japanese: ライダー四号は君だ！！) | Issaku Uchida | Ikuro Suzuki | February 2, 1974 |
| 52 | "The Last Day of Destron"; Transliteration: "Desutoron Saigo no Hi" (Japanese: デストロン最後の日) | Issaku Uchida | Ikuro Suzuki | February 9, 1974 |

== Films ==
- 1973: Kamen Rider V3: A movie version of episode 2.

During a battle against Destron's forces, Shiro Kazami helps a priest who has been attacked by the evil organization's monster Hasami-Jaguar. Little does he know that the church where the priest resides is a front for a Destron hideout. After finding out the organization's latest motive, Kamen Rider V3, along with the Double Riders, must stop Destron from detonating a nuclear bomb in Tokyo.

- 1973: Kamen Rider V3 vs. Destron Mutants

A physicist named Tetsuo Okita discovers a new mineral called "satanum", which is more powerful than uranium and emits destructive effects to anyone exposed to it. However, Destron abducts Okita in hopes of finding the source of satanum and collecting more of it to expedite their run for global domination. Kamen Rider V3 must act fast in rescuing Professor Okita and preventing Destron from collecting more of the deadly mineral.

== S.I.C. Hero Saga ==
Published in Monthly Hobby Japan magazine from May to August 2003, the S.I.C. Hero Saga story Masked Rider V3 & Riderman: Riderman Another After featured an alternate history of Riderman's creation. It featured the new character called the Destron Rider (デストロンライダー, Desutoron Raidā).

Chapter titles

1. God Station (神ステーション, Kami Sutēshon)
2. Attachment (アタッチメント, Atatchimento)
3. Destron Rider (デストロンライダー, Desutoron Raidā)
4. Jōji Yūki (結城丈二, Yūki Jōji)

== Manga ==
A manga adaptation was made by Mitsuru Sugaya during the run of the series.

== Kamen Rider The Next ==
In 2007, a reimagined Kamen Rider V3 appeared in Kamen Rider The Next, a movie loosely based on the TV series, following the reboot of the franchise started with the 2005 movie Kamen Rider The First.

== Cast ==
- Hiroshi Miyauchi as Shiro Kazami
- Takehisa Yamaguchi as Joji Yuki
- Akiji Kobayashi as Tobei Tachibana
- Hizuru Ono as Junko Tama
- Hideki Kawaguchi as Shigeru Tama
- Jōtarō Senba as Doktor G
- Eiji Gō as Baron Kiba
- Sachio Fujino as Archbishop Tsubasa
- Bunya Nakamura as General Yoroi
- Ken Kawashima as Ken Sakuma

=== Voice cast ===
- Gorō Naya as The Destron Leader
- Shinji Nakae as Narrator

=== Suit cast ===
- Tetsuya Nakayashiki as Kamen Rider V3

== Songs ==
Opening theme

- "Tatakae! Kamen Rider V3" (戦え!仮面ライダーV3, Tatakae! Kamen Raidā Bui Surī; "Fight! Kamen Rider V3")
  - Lyrics: Shotaro Ishinomori
  - Composer: Shunsuke Kikuchi
  - Vocals: Hiroshi Miyauchi and The Swingers (ザ・スウィンガーズ, Za Swingāzu)

Ending themes

- "Shōnen Kamen Rider Tai no Uta" (少年仮面ライダー隊の歌, Shōnen Kamen Raidā Tai no Uta; "Song of the Kamen Rider Boys Squad")
  - Lyrics: Saburo Yatsude (八手 三郎, Yatsude Saburō)
  - Composer: Shunsuke Kikuchi
  - Vocals: Ichirou Mizuki and the Columbia Yurikago-Kai (コロムビアゆりかご会, Koromubia Yurikago-Kai)
  - Episodes: 1–42
- "Hashire Hurricane" (走れハリケーン, Hashire Harikēn; "Run, Hurricane")
  - Lyrics: Sukeo Nōmi (能見 佐雄, Nōmi Sao)
  - Composer: Shunsuke Kikuchi
  - Vocals: Masato Shimon and the Columbia Yurikago-Kai
  - Episodes: 43–52

== Broadcast and home video ==
- In its home country of Japan, the series aired on Mainichi Broadcasting System and NET every Saturday night at 7:30 p.m. JST from February 17, 1973, to February 9, 1974, with 52 episodes aired. Later on, Toei started releasing the series on home video under their Toei Video brand. A total of 14 volumes were released on VHS for both sale and rental from September 21, 1985, to November 24, 1989. They did release all 52 episodes, but because they were originally intended to be a compilation of the best episodes, the order of the episodes do not match the order of the episodes that were broadcast chronologically. Then later on, a Laserdisc boxset containing all episodes were released on August 25, 1993. Then the series came as individual Laserdiscs between May 21 and September 21, 2000, spreading throughout seven volumes. Each volume contains eight episodes, while the final only contains four. Then later, a DVD box set containing all the episodes were released on December 6, 2002. Then in 2007 from October 21 to December 7, it was re-released again as individual DVDs to commemorate the release of the movie Kamen Rider: The Next in October of that year. There are 9 volumes in total, each containing 6 episodes (Vol. 8 and Vol. 9 contain 5 episodes). Volumes 1–3, 4–6, and 7–9 were released simultaneously. Episode 1 was included in the "Shotaro Ishinomori 70th Anniversary DVD Box Set" released on July 21, 2008. Most recently, a Blu-ray box set featuring all episodes was released from April 11 to August 8, 2018.
- In Hong Kong, the series was broadcast with a Cantonese Chinese dub from 1975 to 1977 on Rediffusion Television's Chinese Channel, which was the predecessor to Asia Television's Hong Kong Channel. On July 26, 1975, during the airing of this series, two children fell from the roof of a six-story tenement building located at 66B Kowloon City Road in To Kwa Wan while trying to replicate the "Rider Kick", a well-known move from the Kamen Rider series, resulting in one child's death and injuries to the other. This incident prompted parents, educators, and various community members in Hong Kong to hold the television station accountable for broadcasting violent content that they believed was negatively influencing local youth. In light of the public backlash and a directive from the Hong Kong government, TVB was forced to heed public sentiment and announced the suspension of Kamen Rider V3 on July 29 of that year. As a result, later Japanese tokusatsu series aired in Hong Kong avoided using the term "superman" in their titles, opting for alternatives such as "hero" or "warrior", exemplified by titles like Android Kikaider and Warrior of Love Rainbowman. When TVB Jade resumed airing the series in October 1976, it was renamed "Iron Masked Hero". The original title "Kamen Rider" was only restored in later broadcasts of Showa-era productions.
- In 2005, the Hawaii-based company JN Productions/Generation Kikaida released Kamen Rider V3 on a remastered six-disc complete series Region 1 DVD set in Japanese with English Subtitles. However following Generation Kikaida's closure in 2023, their DVD box-set has since been out-of-print.
- In 2024, Discotek Media announced that they had licensed Kamen Rider V3 with plans to release the full 52-episode series on Blu-Ray later that year remastered in HD, along with a brand new English-subtitle translation and many extras included on the set.

== Legacy ==
Riku Sanjo, writter of Kamen Rider W (2009-2010) and several subsequent Kamen Rider series, took an inspiration from Kamen Rider V3 for his Dragon Quest: The Adventure of Dai, citing Shiro Kazami's characterizations (facing struggles despite his capabilities as a Kamen Rider) influencing upon the protagonist Dai to wield uncontrollable powers.
