= Birth of the 10th! Kamen Riders All Together!! =

- Original Japanese title card
- Genre: Tokusatsu; Superhero fiction Science fiction Action/Adventure; Fantasy
- Created by: Shotaro Ishinomori
- Based on: Kamen Rider by Shotaro Ishinomori
- Written by: Kimio Hirayama
- Directed by: Minoru Yamada
- Starring: Shun Sugata; Hiroshi Miyauchi; Takehisa Yamaguchi; Shunsuke Takasugi; Tetsuya Nakayashiki; Kenji Ushio
- Narrated by: Shinji Nakae
- Theme music composer: Shunsuke Kikuchi
- Country of origin: Japan
- Original language: Japanese

Production
- Producers: Toru Hirayama; Seiji Abe
- Running time: 45 minutes
- Production companies: Ishimori Productions; MBS; TBS Television; Toei Company

Original release
- Release: January 3, 1984

Birth of the 10th! Kamen Riders All Together!! (10号誕生!仮面ライダー全員集合!!, Jūgō Tanjō! Kamen Raidā Zen'in Shūgō!!) is a Kamen Rider Series Japanese TV special that aired on January 3, 1984. It is a special meant to celebrate the birth of Kamen Rider ZX, the 10th person to don the Kamen Rider title. Prior to the special, ZX appeared in a manga from 1982 to 1983.

== Plot summary ==
Ryo Murasame is a college student and aircraft pilot. One day he is taking his sister out on a ride along the Amazon when they are shot down by a UFO. They survive only to be captured by the Badan Empire. His sister is killed, while Ryo becomes the Combat Roid known as ZX. His memory is erased by the Badan Empire, and he works as their agent of evil. This doesn't last long; an accident occurs which causes Ryo to regain his memory and escape Badan. He then begins his attack on Badan as they finish the preparations for their doomsday weapon: the Space Break System. A coordinated attack by all of the Kamen Riders disables the Badancium 84 supplies needed for the Space Break System to work. When Ryo arrives, he Believes Kamen Riders V3, Riderman and Super-1 are enemies. The other Riders get him to listen to them and only one truck full of Badancium 84 makes it to Badan's base run by Ambassador Darkness who had his revenge on Takeshi Hongo/Kamen Rider 1 from killing his brother: Ambassador Hell.

After being shown a video detailing the history of Kamen Riders 1 to Super-1, Ryo is amazed that there are others like him. He then joins the Kamen Riders in raiding the base. However, during the raid, he encounters his former comrade, Mikage, who forces him to fight as Tigeroid. After being forced to kill his friend, ZX joins the other 9 Kamen Riders as they battle Ambassador Darkness, the monsters of the Badan Empire, (Note: Most of these are Roids created for Badan, however a few are monsters from previous organizations and series.) and the Combat Roids. When Ambassador Darkness uses the Space Break System on the Kamen Riders, they synch their powers with ZX, using his ZX Kick to kill Ambassador Darkness and destroy Badan's base even as its Great Leader appears and bids the Riders farewell. Soon after, ZX joins the ranks of the Kamen Riders as their 10th member.

== Characters ==
- Ryo Murasame/Kamen Rider ZX (村雨 良／仮面ライダーZX, Murasame Ryō/Kamen Raidā Zekurosu): Ryo is an aircraft pilot, he lives with his sister and it's presumed he lived with his parents. He is impulsive and hesitates to trust the veteran Riders when he first encounters them. He has the most cybernetic body out of any Kamen Rider created thus far. His body has many hidden abilities reminiscent of a ninja, including shuriken and chain-sickles. He does not give himself the Kamen Rider moniker until the final confrontation.
- Rumi Ichijō (一条 ルミ, Ichijō Rumi): She is a girl who is the daughter of a doctor who was killed by Badan. She gives Ryo temporary peacefulness.
- Dr. Hajime Kaidō (海堂 肇博士, Kaidō Hajime Hakase): He is Ryo's father's friend, is a researcher of biochemistry, and is also a teacher at a university. He cooperates with Ryo unstintingly.
- Shizuka Murasame (村雨 しずか, Murasame Shizuka): She is a newspaper reporter and Ryo's elder sister. While investigating rumors of a UFO with Ryo, she is caught by Badan. Since she got to know Badan's secret, she is executed in an electric chair.
- Shiro Kazami/Kamen Rider V3 (風見 志郎／仮面ライダーV3, Kazami Shirō/Kamen Raidā Bui Surī): He is the oldest Rider to appear out of his suit. He is the leader of the Japanese division of the Rider Organization while Kamen Riders 1 and 2 are in America. Apparently, he is the strongest of the veteran Riders as he was the only one able to hold off ZX.
- Joji Yuki/Riderman (結城 丈二／ライダーマン, Yūki Jōji/Raidāman): The second oldest Kamen Rider in the special. He is V3's partner in leading the Kamen Riders when Kamen Riders 1 and 2 are away.
- Kazuya Oki/Kamen Rider Super-1 (沖 一也／仮面ライダースーパー1, Oki Kazuya/Kamen Raidā Sūpā Wan): The youngest (at the time) of the veteran Riders, he tries to persuade ZX into joining the Riders without having to fight.

=== Badan Empire ===
The Badan Empire (バダン帝国, Badan Teikoku) claims to be the successor of all previous groups that attempted to conquer the world but fell without fulfilling that ambition. In Kamen Rider Spirits, several references infer that the Badan Empire was actually created by an alien entity, and supported terrorist groups starting with Shocker secretly working towards bringing the true form of their leader to Earth. Badan later resurfaces during the events of Ressha Sentai ToQger vs. Kamen Rider Gaim: Spring Break Combined Special and Heisei Rider vs. Shōwa Rider: Kamen Rider Taisen feat. Super Sentai.

- The Generalissimo of Badan (バダン総統, Badan Sōtō): A giant skull that appears after Ambassador Darkness' death. It disappears after laughing at the eleven Riders. Dr. Kaidō said that it is the energy of an evil spirit. In the manga, the leader is identified as Great Leader JUDO (大首領JUDO, Daishuryō JUDO), JUDO has a Kamen Rider form called Susanoo (スサノオ), a golden version of ZX with the ability to transform into ten Shōwa Kamen Riders. He has his own language, which he can telepathically compel others to understand.
- Ambassador Darkness (暗闇大使, Kurayami Taishi): He is the leader of the Badan Empire and the brother of Ambassador Hell of the organization Shocker. He is a maniacal man who is hellbent on getting what he wants. He had his revenge on Takeshi Hongo/Kamen Rider 1 from killing his brother. He is destroyed by Kamen Rider ZX's ZX Kick. In the manga, he is transformed into Southern Cross (サザンクロス, Sazan Kurosu) who is a horned turbanlike monster.
- Eisuke Mikage/Tigeroid (三影 英介／タイガーロイド, Mikage Eisuke/Taigāroido): He is a ĺ that is able to produce a wide variety of artillery from his body and has attributes and abilities equal to Ryo, thinking that power is justice. In the manga, he is originally an Interpol office. He was destroyed by Kamen Rider ZX's ZX Kick.

=== Roids Mutant ===
- Bara-Roid:

He was destroyed by Kamen Rider 1's Rider Kick.

- Taka-Roid:

He was destroyed by Kamen Rider X's Rider Kick.

- Yamaarashi-Roid:

He was destroyed by Kamen Rider 1.

- Dokuga-Roid:

He was destroyed by Kamen Rider V3.

- Tokage-Roid:

He was destroyed by Riderman's Net Arm.

- Amenba-Roid:

He was destroyed by Kamen Rider 2.

- Kamaki-Roid:

He was destroyed by Kamen Rider Stronger's Electric Shock.

== Cast ==
- Shun Sugata as Ryo Murasame
- Hiroshi Miyauchi as Shiro Kazami
- Takehisa Yamaguchi as Joji Yuki
- Shunsuke Takasugi as Kazuya Oki
- Tetsuya Nakayashiki (Played as 中屋敷 鉄也) as Eisuke Mikage, Jigokuroid (voice)
- Kenji Ushio as Ambassador Darkness
- Eiji Karasawa as Dr. Hajime Kaidō
- Kaneomi Ōya as Dr. Itō
- Yumiko Miyake as Rumi Ichijō
- Toshie Fukushima as Shizuka Murasame
- Takeshi Sasaki as Kamen Rider 2 (voice)
- Michihiro Ikemizu as Kamen Rider 1 (voice)
- Goro Naya as The Generalissimo of Badan (voice)
- Shinji Nakae as Narrator

== Songs ==
Opening theme

- "Dragon Road" (ドラゴン・ロード, Doragon Rōdo)
  - Lyrics: Shotaro Ishinomori
  - Composition: Shunsuke Kikuchi
  - Arrangement: Kōji Yoshimura (吉村 浩二, Yoshimura Kōji)
  - Artist: Akira Kushida

Ending theme

- "Let's Go!! Rider Kick" (レッツゴー!!ライダーキック, Rettsu Gō!! Raidā Kikku)
  - Lyrics: Shotaro Ishinomori
  - Composition & Arrangement: Shunsuke Kikuchi
  - Artist: Masato Shimon (as Kōichi Fuji) with Male Harmony
