= Our Field of Dreams =

Japanese manga series

- First tankōbon volume cover

俺たちのフィールド (Oretachi no Fīrudo)
- Genre: Sports
- Manga
- Written by: Kenichi Muraeda
- Published by: Shogakukan
- Imprint: Shōnen Sunday Comics
- Magazine: Weekly Shōnen Sunday
- Original run: January 11, 1992 – October 21, 1998
- Volumes: 34

Our Field of Dreams (Japanese: 俺たちのフィールド, Hepburn: Oretachi no Fīrudo) is a Japanese manga series written and illustrated by Kenichi Muraeda. It was serialized in Shogakukan's Weekly Shōnen Sunday from January 1992 to October 1998.

== Plot ==
A soccer loving boy, Takasugi Kazuya, dreams of playing soccer with his Japan League star father at National Yoyogi Stadium. The story follows Kazuya's life as he travels to Argentina, plays for Yamaki, and goes to the 1998 World Cup in France.

== Publication ==
Written and illustrated by Kenichi Muraeda, Our Field of Dreams was serialized in Shogakukan's Weekly Shōnen Sunday from January 11, 1992, to October 21, 1998. Shogakukan collected its chapters in 34 tankōbon volumes, released from July 17, 1992, to January 18, 1999. It was re-published in 19 bunkoban volumes from August 12, 2005, to February 15, 2007.

=== Volumes ===
No.	Japanese release date	Japanese ISBN
1	July 17, 1992	978-4-09-123111-6
2	September 18, 1992	978-4-09-123112-3
3	December 12, 1992	978-4-09-123113-0
4	February 18, 1993	978-4-09-123114-7
5	May 18, 1993	978-4-09-123115-4
6	August 10, 1993	978-4-09-123116-1
7	October 18, 1993	978-4-09-123117-8
8	January 18, 1994	978-4-09-123118-5
9	April 18, 1994	978-4-09-123119-2
10	June 18, 1994	978-4-09-123120-8
11	September 17, 1994	978-4-09-123411-7
12	December 10, 1994	978-4-09-123412-4
13	February 18, 1995	978-4-09-123413-1
14	April 18, 1995	978-4-09-123414-8
15	July 18, 1995	978-4-09-123415-5
16	October 18, 1995	978-4-09-123416-2
17	December 9, 1995	978-4-09-123417-9
18	March 18, 1996	978-4-09-123418-6
19	June 18, 1996	978-4-09-123419-3
20	August 10, 1996	978-4-09-123420-9
21	November 18, 1996	978-4-09-125141-1
22	January 18, 1997	978-4-09-125142-8
23	March 18, 1997	978-4-09-125143-5
24	June 18, 1997	978-4-09-125144-2
25	August 9, 1997	978-4-09-125145-9
26	October 18, 1997	978-4-09-125146-6
27	January 17, 1998	978-4-09-125147-3
28	March 18, 1998	978-4-09-125148-0
29	May 18, 1998	978-4-09-125149-7
30	July 18, 1998	978-4-09-125150-3
31	September 18, 1998	978-4-09-125471-9
32	November 18, 1998	978-4-09-125472-6
33	December 10, 1998	978-4-09-125473-3
34	January 18, 1999	978-4-09-125474-0
