= Kamen Rider Spirits =

Japanese manga series

- Kamen Rider SPIRITS
- Cover of Volume 1 by Kodansha

仮面ライダーSPIRITS (Kamen Raidā Supirittsu)
- Created by: Shotaro Ishinomori
- Manga
- Written by: Kenichi Muraeda
- Published by: Kodansha
- Magazine: Magazine Z (2001–2009); Monthly Shōnen Magazine (2009–present)
- Original run: January 2001 – present
- Volumes: 58
- Manga parts
- 1. Kamen Rider Spirits (vol. 1–16); 2. Shin Kamen Rider Spirits (vol. 17–58); 3. Lonely Kamen Rider (vol. 59–ongoing)

Kamen Rider Spirits (仮面ライダーSPIRITS, Kamen Raidā Supirittsu; trans. Masked Rider Spirits) is a manga adaptation of the popular Kamen Rider franchise by Kenichi Muraeda. The story focuses on the ten original Kamen Riders with shifting focus on main characters. The original series ended when Magazine Z ceased publication and was then revived in the Monthly Shōnen Magazine under the title Shin Kamen Rider Spirits (新・仮面ライダーSPIRITS, Shin Kamen Raidā Supirittsu; New Masked Rider SPIRITS).

== Plot ==
Taking place after the end of the Kamen Rider Super-1 television series, Kamen Rider Spirits is composed of three different arcs, each focusing on different Kamen Riders. The manga also ties up loose ends from the various TV series, such as how Riderman survived the Pluton rocket explosion and why Stronger's partner, Tackle, was never acknowledged as a Kamen Rider.

The first arc, known as The Legend of Masked Riders, is composed of several stand-alone stories that focus on the original nine Kamen Riders who have gone their separate ways. After discovering suspicious activity going on all over the world, the Kamen Riders realize that a new evil is rising.

The second arc, known as Forget Memories, focuses on the tenth Kamen Rider, Kamen Rider ZX, and gives the character an alternate origin story, ignoring the events of the Birth of the 10th! Kamen Riders All Together!! TV special. The second arc also introduces the Badan Empire, the story's main villains.

The third arc, known as Dragon Road, focuses on Kamen Rider ZX joining the original nine Kamen Riders and facing the evil Badan Empire together.

== Volumes and chapters ==
The first three series of Kamen Rider Spirits follow the same continuous volume/chapter count.

=== Kamen Rider Spirits ===
| No. | Japanese release date | Japanese ISBN |
|---|---|---|
| 1 | April 2001 | 4-06-349054-8 |
The Legend of Masked Riders arc 01. Skyscraper Gale; 02. The Lone Battlefield I / 03. The Lone Battlefield II; 04. Pride of the Hot Sand I 05. Pride of the Hot Sand II
| 2 | October 2001 | 4-06-349073-4 |
06. Memories of a Right Arm; 07. Sea of Destruction I 08. Sea of Destruction II / 09. Tears of God I 10. Tears of God II
| 3 | June 2002 | 4-06-349096-3 |
11. The Stray Thunderbolt I 12. The Stray Thunderbolt II; 13. Promises of the Sky I 14. Promises of the Sky II / 15. Legend of the Stars I 16. Legend of the Stars II; 17. Legend of the Stars III
| 4 | February 2003 | 4-06-349117-X |
Forget Memories arc 18. Assault; 19. Darkness; 20. Encounter / 21. Escape; 22. Rage; 23. Rumi
| 5 | September 2003 | 4-06-349144-7 |
24. Attack; 25. Thorn; 26. Demon; 27. Contact / 28. Redemption; 29. Target; 30. Flash
| 6 | May 2004 | 4-06-349168-4 |
31. Henshin; 32. Secret; 33. Battle; 34. Judo / 35. Remembrance; 36. Separation; 37. Lies; 38. Revenge
| 7 | February 2005 | 4-06-349195-1 |
39. Cult; 40. Rescue; 41. Conquest; 42. Invasion / 43. Coup; 44. Shinjuku; 45. The Greater Leader
| 8 | September 2005 | 4-06-362047-6 |
46. Arrival; 47. Sacrifice; 48. Clash; 49. Name / Dragon Road arc 50. Prologue; 51. Syndrome; 52. Participation I 53. Participation II
| 9 | May 2006 | 4-06-349244-3 |
54. Union; 55. Journey; 56. Unit / 57. Capital; 58. Shield
| 10 | August 2006 | 4-06-349255-9 |
59. Spirit Union; 60. Number Fourth; 61. Rush / 62. Ice Fang; 63. Graveyard
| 11 | November 2006 | 4-06-349265-6 |
64. Light Fang; 65. Labyrinth; 66. Hell Car / 67. Teacher; 68. Training
| 12 | April 2007 | 978-4-06-349282-8 |
69. Whirlpool; 70. New Finisher; 71. Ocean Battle / 72. Belt of Life; 73. Immortal Man
| 13 | September 2007 | 978-4-06-349309-2 |
74. Inherit; 75. Get Back; 76. Moving / 77. Evolution; 78. Next Evolution; 79. Final Evolution
| 14 | April 2008 | 978-4-06-349354-2 |
80. Warrior's Essence; 81. Surpassing Greed; 82. Return; 83. Fiery Giant / 84. With the Soul; 85. Setup; 86. Father
| 15 | December 2008 | 978-4-06-349398-6 |
87. Shift; 88. The Shadow's Trump Card; 89. Friend / 90. Garanda; 91. Love; 92. Strength
| 16 | April 2009 | 978-4-06-349426-6 |
93. Warrior of Justice; 94. The One Who Will Rule / 95. Mixture; 96. The Fang of Dual Sovereignty

=== Shin Kamen Rider Spirits ===
Starting from Shin Kamen Rider Spirits the series volume/chapter count is reset.

| No. | Japanese release date | Japanese ISBN |
|---|---|---|
| 01 (17) | November 17, 2009 | 978-4-06-375832-0 |
| 02 (18) | April 16, 2010 | 978-4-06-375902-0 |
| 03 (19) | September 17, 2010 | 978-4-06-375983-9 |
| 04 (20) | April 15, 2011 | 978-4-06-376028-6 |
| 05 (21) | November 17, 2011 | 978-4-06-376144-3 |
| 06 (22) | April 17, 2012 | 978-4-06-376625-7 |
| 07 (23) | November 16, 2012 | 978-4-06-376728-5 |
| 08 (24) | August 16, 2013 | 978-4-06-376890-9 |
| 09 (25) | May 16, 2014 | 978-4-06-376983-8 |
| 10 (26) | November 17, 2014 | 978-4-06-377085-8 |
| 11 (27) | May 15, 2015 | 978-4-06-377172-5 |
| 12 (28) | October 2015 | — |
| 13 (29) | May 2016 | — |
| 14 (30) | October 2016 | — |
| 15 (31) | March 2017 | — |
| 16 (32) | August 2017 | — |
| 17 (33) | December 2017 | — |
| 18 (34) | June 2018 | — |
| 19 (35) | October 2018 | — |
| 20 (36) | January 2019 | — |
| 21 (37) | April 2019 | — |
| 22 (38) | July 2019 | — |
| 23 (39) | October 2019 | — |
| 24 (40) | January 2020 | — |
| 25 (41) | April 2020 | — |
| 26 (42) | July 2020 | — |
| 27 (43) | November 2020 | — |
| 28 (44) | March 2021 | — |
| 29 (45) | August 2021 | — |
| 30 (46) | December 2021 | — |
| 31 (47) | April 2022 | — |

== Characters ==
=== Main ===
- Ryō Murasame / Kamen Rider ZX
- Takeshi Hongō / Kamen Rider 1
- Hayato Ichimonji / Kamen Rider 2
- Shiro Kazami / Kamen Rider V3
- Joji Yuki / Riderman
- Keisuke Jin / Kamen Rider X
- Daisuke Yamamoto / Kamen Rider Amazon
- Shigeru Jō / Kamen Rider Stronger
- Hiroshi Tsukuba / Skyrider
- Kazuya Oki / Kamen Rider Super-1

=== Supporting ===
- Yuriko Misaki / Electro Wave Human Tackle (in flashback)
- Kazuya Taki / Taki Rider - An FBI agent and an old friend of several Kamen Riders, including the first. The lack of a Kamen Rider in America causes Kazuya to take matters into his own hands by donning a motorcycle outfit and skull-logo helmet.
- Annrietta Birkin - An Interpol agent and member of an anti-Destron task force, she supports the ten Kamen Riders. She is attracted to Yuki. Taki calls her "Anri".
- Tobei Tachibana - The mentor of Rider 1, Rider 2, V3, Riderman, X, Amazon, Stronger and ZX.
- Kanji Yada / GanGan G - Skyrider's sidekick.
- Genjiro Tani - Skyrider and Super-1's mentor.
- Junior Rider Team - Super-1's child sidekicks.
- Dr. Mami - Hayato's companion in a civil war-torn country called the Republic of Gamon. She works as a doctor in charge of a hospital for injured people.
- Dr. Kaido - Ryo's mentor and a friend of his father.
- Rumi Ichijō - The daughter of a doctor who was killed by the Badan Empire.
- SPIRITS (Saving Project Incorporate with Kamen Riders on ImmorTal Soul) - a mercenary group formed to fight the Badan Empire. They act as backup for the ten Kamen Riders and are led by Kazuya and Annrietta.

=== Villains ===
- Father Petrescu - A seemingly kindly preacher dedicated to ridding the world of sin. He is actually a vampire and a serial killer. He is killed by Kamen Rider 1's Denko Rider Kick.
- Marshal Armor - A former Destron officer who transferred his consciousness into a massive crab-like beast. He attacks his old enemy, Riderman, in the jungles of Oceania. He is eventually killed by Riderman after being hit in the same spot on his shell one too many times.
- Dead Lion - a former high-ranking member of Black Satan.

==== Badan Empire ====
- Great Leader JUDO (大首領 JUDO, Dai Shūryō JUDO) - The main antagonist, he is the same "Great Leader" who was the supreme leader of all of the evil organizations the nine previous Kamen Riders faced in the past. He leads the Badan Empire and is worshiped like a god by his followers. He possesses the ability to transform into the nine Kamen Riders and a golden version of ZX called Susanoo (スサノオ). He has his own language, which he can telepathically compel others to understand.
- Colonel Gamon / Ambassador Darkness - The nominal leader of the Badan Empire and twin brother of Ambassador Hell of Shocker. The two brothers were once known as General Damon and Colonel Gamon. They fought for the independence of a small Southeast Asian nation later christened "Gamon" after the supposedly deceased Colonel joined Badan. Far more powerful than his brother, Ambassador Darkness cannot be killed by physical means, and can regenerate wounds as grievous as being cut in half in a short period of time.
- Dr. Lars Bohmann - A renowned Norwegian geneticist and former scientist for Badan. In his younger days, he deliberately injured his two children in a plane crash and modified them with cybernetics. When his son, who became Mothroid, discovers this, he uses his poison to burn his father's skin from his body.
- The Last Battalion - A variety of cybernetic monstrosities kept by Badan on various floating islands. Only the Cyborg Elite can control them.
- Badan Vortex - A black hole-like construct used by Badan to suck up "sinners", sparing the Cyborg Elite. The only known way to destroy one is to attack the magic runes used to summon it; doing so appears to cause Ambassador Darkness pain.
- The Cyborg Elite - The self-styled "chosen ones" of the Badan Empire, they believe that they will inherit the Earth once JUDO cleanses it of "sinners". Each is a human given cyborg enhancements that allow them to change into a monster at will.
  - Needle / Yamaarashiroid - Leader of the Cyborg Elite. In human form, he is a mild-mannered, bespectacled man with blond hair. He possesses the ability to produce quills to attack as well as various other effects. After most of the Cyborg Elite fail, he goes after ZX himself, only to be defeated. Afterward, he quits Badan, believing Ambassador Darkness now wants his head for his failure.
  - Combatroids - The lowest-ranked of the Cyborg Elite, often used as grunt fighters. They are led by commanders in all black.
  - General Nguyen / Kumoroid - A celebrated military man of the Republic of Gamon, he seemingly leads the defense of the country against guerillas but in reality is playing both sides of the war; the guerillas are Combatroids in disguise. Killed by Kamen Rider 2, after which peace returns to Gamon.
  - Vega / Takaroid - A young Egyptian street punk who became a cyborg in exchange for Badan aid to his destitute family. He now rules a Badan cyborg factory in the form of a black pyramid. After he makes the largely innocent robot in charge of the factory cry, he is killed by V3.
  - Rosa / Bararoid - Rosa was once a young flamenco dancer who, with her husband, was chased off a cliff by superstitious villagers. She was made into a cyborg by a silver skull in the ocean and returned to haunt the village where she died—especially her father-in-law Greco. She possesses the ability to manifest a person's worst fear out of a pool of water; for the final battle with X, the water takes the form of King Dark. Both she and the silver skull are killed by X, though the skull is later found and reassembled by the Combatroids.
  - Salamander / Tokageroid - One of Needle's three chief lieutenants. In human form, he is a Peruvian assassin codenamed "Salamander". He is sent to kidnap a young cyborg, Victor, and lure him to Badan with promises of command over the Last Battalion. When that plan fails, he is turned into a mindless monster by Needle and killed by Amazon.
  - Eisuke Mikage / Tigeroid - Interpol detective and later henchman of the Badan Empire. He believes that there is no point in saving the world, and so only works to further himself. After taking a grievous wound protecting Ryo Murasame, the future ZX, both are modified by Badan. Mikage becomes Tigeroid, with the ability to produce a wide variety of artillery from his body.
  - Freyr "Poison" Bohmann / Dokugaroid - An effeminate male cyborg who is one of Needle's lieutenants. He is actually Dr. Lars Bohmann's son, who injured him in order to upgrade him with cybernetics. He was modified to secrete the most powerful poison in the world. He is killed by Skyrider after killing his father for using him. He is named for the Norse god Freyr.
  - Freya Bohmann - A good-natured female cyborg and sister to Freyr. She was injured in the same accident engineered by their father and modified to secrete the most powerful antidote in the world. Though she admits she is a monster, her monster form is never seen. Named for the Norse goddess Freya.
  - Asuma / Amenbaroid - A large cyborg and Needle's final lieutenant who attacks Super-1 when he discovers a mysterious crater made by Badan on the moon. In his effort to safeguard the secret, he massacres all but a small squadron of the crew of Super-1's moon base. He is killed by Super-1.
  - LaMoore / Chameleonroid - A Badan assassin sent after ZX when he defects. His human form is that of a grubby street person. Like the animal he is based on, he can climb walls and blend into backgrounds, and he has a long sticky tongue he uses as a weapon. After killing a homeless man befriended by ZX, he is seemingly killed by ZX himself. Although he survives, he is shattered both physically and mentally. After threatening Rumi, he is killed by ZX for good.
  - Jigokuroid, Kamakiroid, Kaniroid - The personal attendants of Ambassador Darkness. Though they have human forms, appearing as a motorcycle gang, they do not interact with humans and thus do not have human names. Antlionroid, the leader, is a stereotypical rebellious teenager. He is attracted to Mantisroid and sees Ambassador Darkness as a father figure to be revolted against. He can create sand pits and survive grievous wounds, but afterwards he takes on a naked and vulnerable form for a time. Mantisroid appears as a beautiful woman in her twenties and is attracted to Ambassador Darkness. She can release a chemical from her fingernails that immobilizes people. Crabroid appears as a little old man with a walking stick. He never speaks, apart from an insane cackling while in monster form. The three can combine with each other, and in this form they are dismembered by ZX after JUDO's influence is purged from their body. A backbone from each of them survives, but they are killed by Needle before they can regenerate.
