= Kenichi Muraeda =

Japanese manga artist

Kenichi Muraeda 村枝 賢一
- Born: September 5, 1967 (age 59) Ashikita, Kumamoto Prefecture, Japan
- Notable works: Kamen Rider Spirits
- Spouse: Shinri Mori

Kenichi Muraeda (村枝 賢一, Muraeda Ken'ichi) is a Japanese manga artist who is known for creating the manga series Kamen Rider Spirits. He is married to fellow manga artist Shinri Mori (森真理, Mori Shinri).

== History ==
After working as an assistant to manga artist Satoshi Yoshida, Muraeda made his debut in 1987 with Arm a Champion (Weekly Shōnen Sunday extra issue, November).

He has been a childhood friend since kindergarten of Fumiaki Tatesako, who was in charge of the manga adaptation of Gyōten Ningen Batseelor. He is known for his friendship with many manga artists who have serialized their works in Weekly Shōnen Sunday, including Katsutoshi Kawai, Kōji Kumeta, Takashi Shiina, and Kazuhiro Fujita, and is also a friend of voice actor Tomokazu Seki.

In the spring of 2012, Muraeda moved from Tokyo to his hometown in Ashikita, Kumamoto Prefecture.

== Works ==
- "Koujirou" (1990)
- "Oretachi no Field" (1992)
- "Red" (1998)
- "Kamoshika!" (1999)
- "Kamen Rider Spirits" (2001–2009)
- "Muraeda Kenichi Tanpenshuu" (2002)
- "Seinaru Yoru ni Sanposuru" (2005)
- "Tentou Pirates" (2007)
- "The End Kajin" (2007)
- "Z-End" (2009)
- "Shin Kamen Rider Spirits" (2009)
