= Kamen Rider vs. Shocker =

- original theatrical poster
- Japanese: 仮面ライダー対ショッカー
- Directed by: Minoru Yamada
- Written by: Masaru Igami
- Starring: Takeshi Sasaki; Hiroshi Fujioka; Jiro Yabuki; Akiji Kobayashi; Hideyo Amamoto; Hajime Izu
- Production company: Toei
- Distributed by: Toei
- Release date: March 18, 1972
- Running time: 32 minutes
- Country: Japan
- Language: Japanese

Kamen Rider vs. Shocker (仮面ライダー対ショッカー, Kamen Raidā Tai Shokkā) is a Japanese tokusatsu superhero short film based on the original Kamen Rider TV series. It's the second Kamen Rider movie ever after Go Go Kamen Rider and the first one that isn't a theatrical rerelease of an episode. It was followed by Kamen Rider vs. Ambassador Hell.

The movie is notable for being the first time Takeshi Hongo/Kamen Rider 1 uses his iconic transformation pose.

== Plot ==
Famous professor Daidoji completed his innovative GX device, which would allow its owner to control gravity. Suddenly, Daidoji, together with his assistant, is attacked by Doctor Death from an evil secret organization called Shocker. He threatens the professor, and after killing his assistant, he demands the device. However, Professor Daidoji manages to escape.

While driving in his car, the professor is once again pursued by Shocker monsters. Using a visual trick, a monster learns that a formula needed to activate the device is with Daidoji's daughter. After that, Kamen Rider 2 arrives at the scene and protects the professor from the terrible monsters.

During her birthday celebration, Shocker attacks Daidoji's daughter, Tamami. Kamen Rider 1, arriving from his foreign travels, appears and fights back. However, Shocker manages to kidnap Tamami. When considering potential future actions, Doctor Death calls the Tachibana Racing Club and offers to exchange Daidoji for his daughter.

After the exchange in the Hell Valley, Doctor Death reveals that all this time it was his trick and he has no intention of letting Kamen Rider 2, who accompanied the professor, leave alive. However, it turns out Professor Daidoji isn't him, but Takeshi Hongo. After the long fight, Kamen Riders 1 and 2 finally destroy the only remaining Shocker cyborg.

== Cast ==
- Takeshi Sasaki as Hayato Ichimonji/Kamen Rider 2
- Hiroshi Fujioka as Takeshi Hongo/Kamen Rider 1
- Jiro Yabuki as Kazuya Taki
- Hideyo Amamoto as Doctor Death
- Wakako Oki as Yuri
- Emily Takami as Emi
- Yuko Sugibayashi as Mika
- Yasuharu Miura as Goro
- Hajime Izu as Odori Daido
- Hiroyuki Miya as Ano's assistant
- Hiroko Saito as Tamami Daidoji
- Mitsuomi Ishihara as Goro's classmate

== Production ==
The film was shot in 1972, when the 46th episode of the TV series was shooting. The movie's shooting lasted only three days.

== Release ==
Kamen Rider vs. Shocker was released theatrically on March 18, 1972, the same day the 51st episode of the TV series it is based on aired on TV.

=== Physical ===
Kamen Rider vs. Shocker was originally released on VHS on April 21, 2000. In later releases, it was packed together with other Kamen Rider movies of the Showa era. The movie was released on DVD with two others Kamen Rider Ichigo films, while for its Blu-ray release, it was packed with other Showa films prior to Kamen Rider Amazon: The Movie, with exception of Go Go Kamen Rider and Kamen Rider V3: The Movie. In 2021, commemorating franchise's 50th anniversary, it was remastered in 4K and released in the Kamen Rider: The Movie 1972-1988 4K Remaster Box.

=== Digital ===
The movie is available on Toei Tokusatsu Fan Club streaming service for the Japanese audience. It was also shows on the official Japanese YouTube channel on November 11, 2021. For the worldwide audience, Kamen Rider vs. Shocker was available with English subtitles for limited time on the official English YouTube channel starting with January 22, 2022, where it was titled MASKED RIDER vs. Shocker.

== Sources ==
- 創刊15周年記念 テレビマガジン特別編集 仮面ライダー大全集. 講談社. 1986-05-03. ISBN 4-06-178401-3.
- 創刊15周年記念 テレビマガジン特別編集 仮面ライダー怪人大全集. 講談社. 1986-10-10. ISBN 4-06-178402-1.
- テレビマガジン特別編集 劇場版シリーズ第10作「仮面ライダーZO」公開記念 仮面ライダー映画大全集. 講談社. 1993-06-10. ISBN 4-06-178415-3.
- 仮面ライダー超全集 1号・2号・V3・ライダーマン. てれびくんデラックス愛蔵版. 小学館. 1992-03-10. ISBN 4-09-101427-5.
- 堤哲哉 編, ed. (1993-11-25). 仮面ライダーカード. 日本文芸社. ISBN 4-537-02386-4.
- 木下正信 (1997-05-31). 仮面ライダー 仮面ライダーV3 カード完全図鑑. 竹書房. ISBN 4-8124-0300-6.
- 岩佐陽一 編, ed. (2000-07-14). 仮面ライダー大全. 双葉社. ISBN 4-575-29121-8.
- 竹書房/スタジオ・ハード編, ed. (2001-09-25). 仮面ライダー画報. 竹書房. ISBN 4-8124-0783-4.
- 全怪獣怪人大辞典（上巻）東映篇. 編集：井上嘉大. 英知出版. 2003-03-20. ISBN 4-7542-2016-1.
- 『KODANSHA Official File Magazine 仮面ライダー』（講談社）
  - Vol.1 仮面ライダー1号. 2004-07-09. ISBN 4-06-367086-4.
  - Vol.2 仮面ライダー2号. 2004-10-08. ISBN 4-06-367092-9.
  - Vol.7 仮面ライダーストロンガー. 2004-08-25. ISBN 4-06-367095-3.
  - Vol.10 仮面ライダーZX. 2004-10-25. ISBN 4-06-367093-7.
  - 特別版 Vol.1 ショッカー. 2005-09-22. ISBN 4-06-367099-6.
- TARKUS 編, ed. (2007-06-05). 仮面ライダー大研究. 二見書房. ISBN 978-4-576-07090-2.
- 安藤幹夫 編, ed. (2011-05-02). 仮面ライダー怪人列伝 1号 2号 V3編. 竹書房. ISBN 978-4-8124-4542-6.
- 仮面ライダー超辞典. 監修：石森プロ・東映. 双葉社. 2011-07-24. ISBN 978-4-575-30333-9.
- 語れ！仮面ライダー [永久保存版]. 編集：鈴木康成. KKベストセラーズ. 2013-04-23. ISBN 978-4-584-20497-9.
- 講談社編, ed. (2014-03-20). 仮面ライダー 1号・2号編 仮面の男パーフェクトファイル. キャラクター大全. 講談社. ISBN 978-4-06-218825-8.
- 仮面ライダー1971-1984 秘蔵写真と初公開資料で蘇る昭和ライダー10人. 講談社 編. 講談社. 2014-11-20. ISBN 978-4-06-218566-0.
- 宇宙船別冊 仮面ライダー怪人大画報2016. ホビージャパンMOOK. ホビージャパン. 2016-03-28. ISBN 978-4-7986-1202-7.
