= Shinji Nakae =

Japanese actor, voice actor and narrator

- 中江 真司
- Born: Yoshitaka Satō; April 20, 1935; Kōtō, Tokyo, Japan
- Died: June 28, 2007 (aged 72); Koganei, Tokyo, Japan
- Occupations: Actor; voice actor; narrator
- Years active: 1958–2007
- Agent: Aoni Production
- Height: 167 cm (5 ft 6 in)
- Spouse: Michiko Hirai

Yoshitaka Satō (佐藤 良孝, Satō Yoshitaka; April 20, 1935 — June 28, 2007), known by the stage name Shinji Nakae (中江 真司, Nakae Shinji), was a Japanese actor, voice actor, and narrator from Kōtō, Tokyo. He graduated from Kamakura Gakuen Senior High School, and was affiliated with Aoni Production at the time of his death. He was married with fellow voice actress Michiko Hirai, until her death.

Nakae narrated numerous Nintendo commercials during 2006. He retired in 2007 due to his failing health; Hitoshi Kubota took over his role as the narrator of the Nintendo commercials, and Ryūzaburō Ōtomo took over his role as the narrator of the Hey! Spring of Trivia game show.

Shinji Nakae died of hepatocellular carcinoma in a Koganei hospital on June 28, 2007. He was 72 years old.

== Filmography ==
=== Television animation ===
- Cromartie High School (2003) (Narrator)
- Fruits Basket (2001) (Narrator)
- Kiniro no Corda ~primo passo~ (xxxx) (Nakata)
- Kiteretsu Daihyakka ((xxxx) Yashiro, Honma)
- Marmalade Boy (xxxx) (Principal)
- One Piece (2003) (Shandia Chief)
- Tetsujin 28-Go FX (xxxx) (Commander)
- Oh My Goddess! (xxxx) (TV Narrator)
- Tekkaman: The Space Knight (xxxx) (Narrator)
- Tomorrow's Joe (xxxx) (Hurricane)
- Gaiking: Legend of Daiku-Maryu (2005) (Doctor Wong)
- Glass Mask (2005) (Narrator, Genzō)

=== OVA ===
- Blazing Transfer Student (xxxx) (Narrator)
- Doki Doki School Hours (xxxx) (Narrator)
- Labyrinth of Flames (xxxx) (Narrator)

=== Film ===
- Prophecies of Nostradamus (1974) (Narrator)
- The War in Space (1977) (Narrator)

=== Video games ===
- Metal Gear Solid 3: Snake Eater (2004) (Lyndon B. Johnson)
- Tales of Fandom Vol.2 (xxxx) (Count Steinmetz)
- Super Tokusatsu Wars 2001 (2001) (Narrator)
- Ace Combat 6 (xxxx) (Narrator, System Voice)

=== Tokusatsu ===
- Kamen Rider Series (Narrator)
- Dai Sentai Goggle V (Goggle Robo)
- Ultraseven (Alien Metron and Alien Annon)
