= Kamen Rider Ghost: The 100 Eyecons and Ghost's Fated Moment =

- Theatrical poster

Japanese name
- Kanji: 劇場版 仮面ライダーゴースト 100の眼魂とゴースト運命の瞬間
Transcriptions
- Revised Hepburn: Gekijōban Kamen Raidā Gōsuto Hyaku no Aikon to Gōsuto Unmei no Toki
- Directed by: Satoshi Morota
- Written by: Takuro Fukuda
- Based on: Kamen Rider Ghost by Takuro Fukuda
- Starring: Shun Nishime; Hikaru Ohsawa; Ryosuke Yamamoto; Takayuki Yanagi; Hayato Isomura; Ryo Kimura; Naoto Takenaka; Ikki Sawamura
- Music by: Go Sakabe
- Distributed by: Toei Company
- Release date: August 6, 2016
- Running time: 64 minutes
- Country: Japan
- Language: Japanese
- Box office: US$7.8 million

Kamen Rider Ghost the Movie: The 100 Eyecons and Ghost's Fated Moment (劇場版 仮面ライダーゴースト 100の眼魂とゴースト運命の瞬間, Gekijōban Kamen Raidā Gōsuto Hyaku no Aikon to Gōsuto Unmei no Toki) is a 2016 Japanese film, serving as the film adaptation of the 2015-2016 Kamen Rider Series television series Kamen Rider Ghost, and featuring the debut of the protagonist of Kamen Rider Ex-Aid. It was released in Japan on August 6, 2016, in a double billing with Doubutsu Sentai Zyuohger the Movie: The Exciting Circus Panic!.

== Plot ==
When Takeru and his friends celebrate Kanon's 15th birthday, the sky suddenly changes its color. Riding on the Iguana Ghostriker, Takeru, Makoto, and Alain investigate this phenomenon. What they discover is a giant Eyecon in the sky emitting a strange light, which sucked them in! Because of this, they were transported in a village where heroes from the ages are living together.

== Cast ==
- Takeru Tenkūji (天空寺 タケル, Tenkūji Takeru): Shun Nishime (西銘 駿, Nishime Shun)
- Akari Tsukimura (月村 アカリ, Tsukimura Akari): Hikaru Ohsawa (大沢 ひかる, Ōsawa Hikaru)
- Makoto Fukami (深海 マコト, Fukami Makoto): Ryosuke Yamamoto (山本 涼介, Yamamoto Ryōsuke)
- Onari (御成): Takayuki Yanagi (柳 喬之, Yanagi Takayuki)
- Alain (アラン, Aran): Hayato Isomura (磯村 勇斗, Isomura Hayato)
- Shibuya (シブヤ): Takuya Mizoguchi (溝口 琢矢, Mizoguchi Takuya)
- Narita (ナリタ): Reo Kansyuji (勧修寺 玲旺, Kanshūji Reo)
- Kanon Fukami (深海 カノン, Fukami Kanon): Mio Kudo (工藤 美桜, Kudō Mio)
- Miyamoto Musashi (宮本 武蔵): Mitsuru Karahashi (唐橋 充, Karahashi Mitsuru)
- Himiko (卑弥呼): Yuka Hirata (平田 裕香, Hirata Yuka)
- Ishikawa Goemon (石川 五右衛門): Ami 201 (阿見 201, Ami Niimaruichi; of Dekobokodan)
- Robin Hood (ロビン・フッド, Robin Fuddo): Naoki Komatsu (小松 直樹, Komatsu Naoki)
- Charles Darwin (チャールズ・ダーウィン, Chāruzu Dāwin): Ian Moore (イアン・ムーア, Ian Mūa)
- Thomas Edison (トーマス・エジソン, Tōmasu Ejison): Chad Mullane (チャド・マレーン, Chado Marēn; of Chad Mullane)
- Otsū (おつう): Megumi Saito (齋藤 めぐみ, Saitō Megumi)
- Benkei (弁慶): Kenji Tominaga (富永 研司, Tominaga Kenji)
- Oda Nobunaga (織田 信長): Kenji Takechi (武智 健二, Takechi Kenji)
- Cleopatra (クレオパトラ, Kureopatora): Yurika Tachibana (橘 ゆりか, Tachibana Yurika)
- Houdini (フーディーニ, Fūdībi): Jeremy Eaton (ジャーミー・イートン, Jāmī Īton)
- Sakamoto Ryōma (坂本 龍馬): Taihei Katō (加藤 泰平, Katō Taihei) (TV Asahi Announcer)
- Jared (ジェレド, Jeredo): Hiroyuki Yasoshima (八十島 弘行, Yasoshima Hiroyuki; of 2700)
- Gevril (ジェビル, Jebiru): Tsune (ツネ; of 2700)
- Jay (ジェイ, Jei): Yuko Takayama (高山 侑子, Takayama Yūko)
- Beethoven (ベートーベン, Bētōben): Show Ayanocozey (綾小路 翔, Ayanokōji Shō) (Kishidan)
- Bach (バッハ, Bahha): Hikaru Saotome (早乙女 光, Saotome Hikaru) (Kishidan)
- Mozart (モーツァルト, Mōtsaruto): Hitomi Saionji (西園寺 瞳, Saionji Hitomi) (Kishidan)
- Chopin (ショパン, Shopan): Hoshi Grandmarnier (星 グランマニエ, Hoshi Guranmanie) (Kishidan)
- Schubert (シューベルト, Shūberuto): Shouchikubai Shiratori (白鳥 松竹梅, Shiratori Shōchikubai) (Kishidan)
- Argos (アルゴス, Arugosu): Ryo Kimura (木村 了, Kimura Ryō)
- Hermit (仙人, Sennin): Naoto Takenaka (竹中 直人, Takenaka Naoto)
- Daigo Fukami (深海 大悟, Fukami Daigo): Ikki Sawamura (沢村 一樹, Sawamura Ikki)
- Yurusen (ユルセン; Voice): Aoi Yūki (悠木 碧, Yūki Aoi)
- Kamen Rider Ex-Aid (仮面ライダーエグゼイド, Kamen Raidā Eguzeido; Voice): Hiroki Iijima (飯島 寛騎, Iijima Hiroki)
- Gamer Driver and Rider Gashat Voices: Hironobu Kageyama (影山 ヒロノブ, Kageyama Hironobu)

== Theme song ==
- "ABAYO"
  - Lyrics & Composition: Show Ayanocozey
  - Arrangement: Takeshi Kiuchi, Show Ayanocozey
  - Artist: Kishidan

== Short Stories ==
Roadshow Commemoration! Short Stories (公開記念! ショートストーリー, Kōkai Kinen! Shōto Sutōrī) is a set of short movies to promote the movie that aired following episodes 39-42 of the series.

1. Magnificent! The World of the Beginning! (壮大！はじまりの世界！, Sōdai! Hajimari no Sekai!)
2. Strongest! Another Ghost! (最強！もう1人のゴースト！, Saikyō! Mō Hitori no Gōsuto!)
3. Upheaval! 100 Souls! (動乱！100人の魂！, Dōran! Hyakunin no Tamashii!)
4. Fate! The Two Takerus! (宿命！2人のタケル！, Shukumei! Futari no Takeru!)

== Reception ==
The film was 4th placed at the box office on its opening weekend in Japan, with 174,438 admissions and a gross of ¥211 million. By its second weekend it had grossed US$5 million.
