= List of Kamen Rider Ghost episodes =

Kamen Rider Ghost is a 2015-2016 Japanese television series, the 26th entry of the long-running Kamen Rider Series, and 17th in the Heisei era run of the show. The series is directed by Satoshi Morota and written by Takuro Fukuda. It premiered on TV Asahi on October 4, 2015.

The series' opening theme is "Warera Omou, Yue ni Warera Ari" (我ら思う、故に我ら在り; "We Think, Therefore We Are") performed by the Japanese rock band Kishidan.

Much like some of Gaim's earlier episodes, the episode titles for this season are all in the form of a exclamatory sentences, with the first one being exactly two kanji long much like Kuuga's episodes.

== Episodes ==
No.	Title	Directed by	Written by	Original release date
1	"Eyes Open! It's Me!"; Transliteration: "Kaigan! Ore!" (Japanese: 開眼！俺！)	Satoshi Morota	Takuro Fukuda	October 4, 2015
On his 18th birthday, Takeru Tenkūji receives a gift of a strange item called an Eyecon from his long lost ghost-hunting father Ryū, who left years before to try to see if ghosts actually exist. However, once the Eyecon is in his possession, Takeru discovers he can see ghosts, but something happens to him before he can tell anyone else.
2	"Shocking! The Invention King!"; Transliteration: "Dengeki! Hatsumeiō!" (Japanese: 電撃！発明王！)	Satoshi Morota	Takuro Fukuda	October 11, 2015
In order to revive himself completely, Takeru must find 15 heroic Eyecons before his 99 days are up and that he will die and become a ghost forever. Having already obtained Musashi, he sets out to find the remaining 14 heroic Eyecons. Searching for abnormal phenomenon within the city, Takeru stumbles upon a warehouse where a man is immersed in creating new inventions which Takeru finds the Edison Eyecon.
3	"Bull's-eye! Archery of Justice!"; Transliteration: "Hitchū! Seigi no Yumiya!" (Japanese: 必中！正義の弓矢！)	Kyohei Yamaguchi	Takuro Fukuda	October 18, 2015
The cat burglar "Little John" appears in town, stealing from the rich and giving to the poor, with the local newsreporter Mari Shirase calling him a modern Robin Hood. The hermit tells Takeru that Robin Hood is one of the other Eyecons that he must gather, so he goes to meet with Mari to get help in tracking down Little John.
4	"Amazing! The Castle in the Sky!"; Transliteration: "Kyōgaku! Sora no Shiro!" (Japanese: 驚愕！空の城！)	Kyohei Yamaguchi	Takuro Fukuda	October 25, 2015
The hermit tells Takeru that the next Eyecon is Oda Nobunaga's but it is currently unobtainable. Meanwhile, he is alerted to odd activity at an office building where things are mysteriously floating. Could it be the work of a Gamma?
5	"Shocking! The Mysterious Kamen Rider!"; Transliteration: "Shōgeki! Nazo no Kamen Raidā!" (Japanese: 衝撃！謎の仮面ライダー！)	Satoshi Morota	Takuro Fukuda	November 8, 2015
Takeru tries to figure out the intentions of the mysterious other Kamen Rider when he investigates gunfire at a local school.
6	"Fate! The Comeback Melody!"; Transliteration: "Unmei! Saiki no Merodi!" (Japanese: 運命！再起のメロディ！)	Satoshi Morota	Nobuhiro Mouri	November 15, 2015
Takeru, Akari, and Onari investigate a young musician who seems to have all sound around him disappear, but when another Gamma appears, Kamen Rider Ghost and Kamen Rider Specter battle each other once more, all over the spirit of Beethoven.
7	"Quick Draw! The Legendary Gunman!"; Transliteration: "Hayauchi! Densetsu no Ganman!" (Japanese: 早撃！伝説のガンマン！)	Takayuki Shibasaki	Takuro Fukuda	November 22, 2015
The hermit informs Takeru that the next hero he should seek out is Billy the Kid, and that it will be near one of his close friends. However, Takeru instead finds Makoto Fukami and he confronts him on what his true intentions are.
8	"Activation! Another Monolith!"; Transliteration: "Hatsudō! Mō Hitotsu no Monorisu!" (Japanese: 発動！もう一つのモノリス！)	Takayuki Shibasaki	Takuro Fukuda	November 29, 2015
After chasing down a Giant Gamma in the Iguana Ghostriker, Takeru discovers Akari and Onari have been kidnapped by Gamma Commandos. When going to save them, Takeru encounters Makoto and the mysterious figure known as Saionji, who reveals he knew Takeru's father Ryū and that he had been involved in an experiment. What is the experiment? And what does it have to do with Makoto as Kamen Rider Specter?
9	"Imposing! The Loyal Man!"; Transliteration: "Dōdō! Chūgi no Otoko!" (Japanese: 堂堂！忠義の男！)	Kyohei Yamaguchi	Nobuhiro Mouri	December 6, 2015
Takeru meets up with Professor Igarashi, one of his father's friends, to see if his research can shed some light on what happened to him.
10	"Gathered! Fifteen Eyecons!"; Transliteration: "Shūketsu! Jūgo no Aikon!" (Japanese: 集結！15の眼魂！)	Kyohei Yamaguchi	Nobuhiro Mouri	December 13, 2015
Takeru becomes conflicted when he discovers that Makoto wants to use the Eyecons to save his sister, while he simply wants to come back to life. Takeru thinks there has to be another way, but Makoto attacks him to steal his remaining Eyecons before time runs out.
11	"Magnificent! Mysterious Eyes!"; Transliteration: "Shōgon! Shinpi no Me!" (Japanese: 荘厳！神秘の目！)	Satoshi Morota	Takuro Fukuda	December 20, 2015
With all fifteen Eyecons gathered, Saionji barges his way into Daitenkū-ji to the Monolith to demand the ability to take over the world. However, Takeru is taken into a giant mandala called the Great Eye that has appeared in the sky and is asked one question by a disembodied voice: "What is your wish?"
12	"Heroic! A Man's Resolve!"; Transliteration: "Sōzetsu! Otoko no Kakugo!" (Japanese: 壮絶！男の覚悟！)	Satoshi Morota	Takuro Fukuda	December 27, 2015
Takeru's wish to bring Makoto's sister Kanon back starts their search for the Eyecons all over again, but without Gammas to point the way, Akari and Onari are worried that they are too late to bring Takeru back to life. The return of the Gamma Superior means they are on the right track, but something happens to Takeru after he transforms into Kamen Rider Ghost, again.
13	"Exciting! A Free Man!"; Transliteration: "Gōkai! Jiyū na Otoko!" (Japanese: 豪快！自由な男！)	Nobuhiro Suzumura	Nobuhiro Mouri	January 10, 2016
Thanks to his father's soul, Takeru is still free to collect the 15 Ghost Eyecons once more, and by doing so, he can also bring his father back. But first, he encounters the soul of Sakamoto Ryōma, who poses a challenge for Takeru before he willingly joins him, and that challenge is fighting the Katana Gamma once more while using the Goemon Eyecon.
14	"Superb View! The Dawn of the Earth!"; Transliteration: "Zekkei! Chikyū no Yoake!" (Japanese: 絶景！地球の夜明け！)	Nobuhiro Suzumura	Nobuhiro Mouri	January 17, 2016
After the Planet Gamma's attack, Takeru tries to make it his priority, but Onari persuades him to focus on helping Nagamasa resolve things with his father Satsunoshin first. The split between father and son has something to do with the past, and Takeru must figure out what that event was to resolve their differences before the Planet Gamma's attacks, again.
15	"Agony! The Stubborn Escape King!"; Transliteration: "Kunō! Ganko na Dasshutsu-ō!" (Japanese: 苦悩！頑固な脱出王！)	Kyohei Yamaguchi	Takuro Fukuda	January 24, 2016
Alain makes Makoto doubt that his sister is truly back to normal, leading Takeru to try to convince him otherwise. However, Javel's return complicates matters as he focuses his attacks on Makoto.
16	"Perfect! The White Kamen Rider!"; Transliteration: "Kanpeki! Shiroi Kamen Raidā!" (Japanese: 完璧！白い仮面ライダー！)	Kyohei Yamaguchi	Takuro Fukuda	January 31, 2016
Takeru decides that he must follow in his father's footsteps and figure out a way to stop the Gammas by preventing them from ever entering the human world. However, the sudden appearance of several Gamma Commandos leads them to put these plans on hold, particularly when Takeru and Makoto discover that they are being led by a new enemy, Kamen Rider Necrom.
17	"Gorgeous! The Phantom Queen!"; Transliteration: "Kenran! Maboroshi no Joō!" (Japanese: 絢爛！幻の女王！)	Satoshi Morota	Keiichi Hasegawa	February 7, 2016
Takeru investigates a Gamma that seems to be only attacking young women.
18	"Turn-Around! Mysterious Science!"; Transliteration: "Gyakuten! Shinpi na Kagaku!" (Japanese: 逆転！神秘な科学！)	Satoshi Morota	Keiichi Hasegawa	February 14, 2016
When the spirit of Himiko isn't the cause of the strange happenings in the city, the Newton Eyecon leads Takeru to the Gamma World for a revelation. With Makoto also out of action during the continued attacks on young women, Akari and Onari step forward to try to discover the reason for the attacks, but Akari must first improve the Shiranui formulation.
19	"Explosion! Paint From Your Heart!"; Transliteration: "Bakuhatsu! E o Kaku Kokoro!" (Japanese: 爆発！絵を描く心！)	Katsuya Watanabe	Takuro Fukuda	February 21, 2016
Takeru tries to devise a way to save Makoto from Alain's control, but must also deal with a friendly Gamma that only wants to paint.
20	"Eruption! The Flames of Friendship!"; Transliteration: "Sakuretsu! Honō no Yūjō!" (Japanese: 炸裂！炎の友情！)	Katsuya Watanabe	Takuro Fukuda	February 28, 2016
Takeru tries to teach the Art Supplies Gamma the meaning of friendship, but must also deal with both Igor and Necrom Specter seeking to destroy the "incomplete" Gamma.
21	"Amazing! The Gamma's World!"; Transliteration: "Kyōi! Ganma no Sekai!" (Japanese: 驚異！眼魔の世界！)	Kyohei Yamaguchi	Keiichi Hasegawa	March 6, 2016
Takeru discovers that Makoto's real body still exists in the Gamma World, and once that disappears, Makoto will as well. To save Makoto, Takeru enlists the help of Akari who tries to use the Art Supplies Gamma to figure out a way to save Makoto, but Makoto has already gone off on his own to settle matters his own way.
22	"Conspiracy! Adel's Trap!"; Transliteration: "Bōryaku! Aderu no Wana!" (Japanese: 謀略！アデルの罠！)	Kyohei Yamaguchi	Keiichi Hasegawa	March 13, 2016
Takeru finds himself fighting Alain and two Gamma Superiors while Makoto meets Alia and Emperor Adonis who is informed of his children's antics in the human world for the first time.
23	"Possessed! The Giant Eyecon!"; Transliteration: "Nyūkon! Dekkai Aikon!" (Japanese: 入魂！デッカい眼魂！)	Satoshi Morota	Takuro Fukuda	March 20, 2016
Takeru is horrified at the things he witnessed in the Gamma World, but now with all 15 Eyecons gathered once more with Alain now an ally, he wonders what to do for the future. Their plans are waylaid when Adel sends Jabel to the human world once more to kill Alain.
24	"Appearance! The Mysterious Warrior!"; Transliteration: "Shutsugen! Nazo no Senshi!" (Japanese: 出現！謎の戦士！)	Satoshi Morota	Nobuhiro Mouri	March 27, 2016
Part 2 of the "Spring Break Combined Hero Festival". Akari and the others cannot believe that Makoto, who saved Alain from harm, was only an Eyecon. Takeru, now knowing that Makoto’s body is in the Gamma World, intends to go but the others stop him. Kanon offers Alain’s help but Takeru does not trust him. After witnessing this, Kanon goes by herself to convince Alain. Sightings of a Mouse Monster have been reported. It seems to be different than a Gamma. On top of that, Goemon’s ghost has possessed Onari. Alain is still the target of assassins and he still cannot get used to a flesh body and the fear of death. As Takeru's troubles pile up, a red warrior who once fought by his side appears to lend a hand.
25	"Disaster! The Red Sky!"; Transliteration: "Ihen! Akai Sora!" (Japanese: 異変！赤い空！)	Katsuya Watanabe	Keiichi Hasegawa	April 3, 2016
Takeru is now more resolute in bringing Makoto’s body back from the Gamma World and Alain seems to have agreed to help. However, Akari is the one to stop them, stating that “It is not time yet.” Akari senses that something is going through Alain’s mind and is determined to find out more. Igor issues new orders to Bills and the Airplane Gamma. Alain, irritated at the way Akari is seeing through him, goes to Fumi’s takoyaki stall and Kanon is there. Suddenly, she falls unconscious. When Alain looks up, the sky is red.
26	"Conflict! The Terms of Resolution!"; Transliteration: "Kattō! Ketsudan no Jōken!" (Japanese: 葛藤！決断の条件！)	Katsuya Watanabe	Keiichi Hasegawa	April 10, 2016
In spite of Takeru defeating the Airplane Gamma, the red sky continues expanding. Weakened after his battle with Javel, Alain is suffering the same effects as Kanon from the red sky. Thanks to Akari, things are not going as he intends them to. Alain finds Akari concentrated on her work and approaches silently... While Kanon’s condition worsens, Takeru, along with Narita, Shibuya and Onari, go around the city looking for the origin of the red sky. Without any concrete pattern or direction, the group is left in confusion. Alain fights Igor and the Grimm Eyecon helps, much to Alain's surprise.
27	"Do-or-Die! Ready for Infiltration!"; Transliteration: "Kesshi! Kakugo no Sennyū!" (Japanese: 決死！覚悟の潜入！)	Kyohei Yamaguchi	Takuro Fukuda	April 17, 2016
Takeru and Alain have returned to the Gamma World. The former returns to save Makoto while the latter is set on finding answers. Takeru, under the impression that they both had the same objective in mind, loses sight of Alain. What are his true intentions? Meanwhile, Akari, Onari, and Kanon can’t do anything but wait. Akari continues trying to break the code of the Monolith while Onari teaches Cubi more about humans. Igor, on his side, continues with his plan. Adel has witnessed the birth of a new threat from the Praying Room...
28	"Bursting! The Power of the Abyss!"; Transliteration: "Bakugen! Shin'en no Chikara!" (Japanese: 爆現！深淵の力！)	Kyohei Yamaguchi	Takuro Fukuda	April 24, 2016
After witnessing the murder of his father Adonis by his older brother Adel, Alain is unable to move and cannot overcome the situation and feelings it caused. Makoto has obtained a mysterious new Eyecon and goes in search of Takeru, who did not return after his encounter with the Gammisers. With both Alain and Takeru hurt, Makoto uses the Eyecon and transforms into Deep Specter. In the human world, Cubi is in a slump. While trying to clear his head, he is confronted by the Music Note Gamma. Akari, Onari, and even Igor are added into the mix. Will Onari and Akari be able to overcome this pinch?
29	"Second Coming! Ordeal of the Escape King!"; Transliteration: "Sairin! Dasshutsu-ō no Shiren!" (Japanese: 再臨！脱出王の試練！)	Koichi Sakamoto	Nobuhiro Mouri	May 1, 2016
Yuki Shirai visits Daitenkū-ji claiming that she saw her supposedly dead father entering the Deep Connect HQ building. The Houdini Eyecon, for some reason, decides to possess her. Takeru heads to Deep Connect to find out the truth. Having lost his father, Alain is at loss of purpose in his life. Fumi approaches him and acts kindly by giving him new clothes. Makoto appears before him, asking for his help in investigating Yuki’s incident but...
30	"Forever! Cries of the Heart!"; Transliteration: "Eien! Kokoro no Sakebi!" (Japanese: 永遠！心の叫び！)	Koichi Sakamoto	Nobuhiro Mouri	May 8, 2016
Alain had brought a drawing set for Fumi but her takoyaki stand is full of people looking worried while an ambulance is seen rushing away. Alain cannot believe what he hears once he asks what happened, his hope fading away yet again… Yuki has infiltrated Deep Connect and it is none other than CEO Steve Bills who finds her, but offers her his help. Takeru and the others come afterwards and, while not fully trusting Bills, they follow him. Yuki finally reaches where her father is but a terrible truth awaits.
31	"Bizarre! The Power of the Gammisers!"; Transliteration: "Kimyō! Ganmaizā no Chikara!" (Japanese: 奇妙！ガンマイザーの力！)	Katsuya Watanabe	Keiichi Hasegawa	May 15, 2016
Alain has taken a big step by deciding to live as a human with Fumi’s memory in his heart. He asks Takeru and Makoto for help. After many difficulties, their objective has unified and they can now fully join forces. Alain proposes destroying the gates that connect this world to the Gamma World. Still at doubt about the recent insight into people’s memories he's been having, Takeru agrees to assist Alain. In the Gamma World, Edith questions Adel: “What do you wish for?” Adel laughs this question off and uses his newfound power. As a consequence, many adults have become children around the city, Shibuya’s mother being one of them. Daitenkū-ji is filled with children and a familiar face makes an appearance.
32	"Reminiscence! The Hidden Heart!"; Transliteration: "Tsuioku! Himeta Kokoro!" (Japanese: 追憶！秘めた心！)	Katsuya Watanabe	Keiichi Hasegawa	May 22, 2016
Igarashi has called Takeru into the memories of past times. He finds out a truth that has been hidden for 10 years. The wishes and feelings of his father, Igarashi, Saionji and the hermit resonate inside him. What could be beyond these strange changes Takeru is experiencing?! Meanwhile, Shibuya is looking for his mother, who has escaped yet again. More and more adults are being turned into children. Society itself may spiral out of control. Everyone is running against the clock to solve the mysterious phenomenon the new Gammiser has set in motion.
33	"Miracle! Infinite Feelings!"; Transliteration: "Kiseki! Mugen no Omoi!" (Japanese: 奇跡！無限の想い！)	Katsuya Watanabe	Keiichi Hasegawa	May 29, 2016
Gammiser Gravity began to attack along Gammiser Fire. This attack made some significant damage. Alain trying to protect the earth with its latent strength. These forces can kill Alain as well, because it was trying to protect Takeru Alain and destroy Gammiser Fire. It's unexpected happens Eyecon Takeru broken by attacks from Gammiser Gravity and Takeru disappeared. Takeru disappeared among the friends of his sad. Some ways to do to restore Takeru. Alain and Makoto were attacking several gates. To fight Gammiser, Akari opened the gates of another world to throw Gammiser there. But this method fails. Gammiser escaped from another world and make all seriously injured.
34	"Wandering! The World of Dreams!"; Transliteration: "Meisō! Yume no Sekai!" (Japanese: 迷走！夢の世界！)	Kyohei Yamaguchi	Nobuhiro Mouri	June 5, 2016
Thanks to Takeru's friends being able to revive him through the destroyed Ore Ghost Eyecon, he was able to defeat the immortal existence of the Gammiser thanks to a new form made of light! Yurusen, who helped to revive Takeru, still remains as a ghost. And the hermit is beginning to talk about Takeru's own existence. The fact does not escape the hermit, as he himself doesn't know what state he is in now. Although there are less days now until his death, he seems to have revived completely. Meanwhile, Akari's professor won't wake up from the Dream World, as they discover that Igor is eventually behind all this. Adel sends in a new Gammiser, but still wary of Takeru's new form. As the battle in the Dream World begins to heat up, Takeru's rider of light appears once again...
35	"Real Worth! The Power of Fun!"; Transliteration: "Shinka! Tanoshisa no Chikara!" (Japanese: 真価！楽しさの力！)	Kyohei Yamaguchi	Nobuhiro Mouri	June 12, 2016
The Dream World Takeru and the others were investigating was another one of Igor’s schemes. Jirō Katagiri, Akari’s professor and Yūichi's younger brother, insists that he won’t leave the Dream World. The brothers' squabble catches the attention of the Grimm Eyecon and the Brothers Grimm themselves start having a discussion about fun. Due to this, Grateful Damashii can no longer be maintained and the Eyecon is stolen. A new Gammiser has appeared as well. In the meantime, Makoto and Alain, tasked with protecting Takeru’s body, confront a Gammiser themselves in the real world.
36	"Vehement! Idol Declaration!"; Transliteration: "Mōretsu! Aidoru Sengen!" (Japanese: 猛烈！アイドル宣言！)	Koichi Sakamoto	Keiichi Hasegawa	June 19, 2016
Igor changes his strategy after Mugen Damashii defeats another Gammiser. Takeru finally knows the true meaning of fun thanks to the Brothers Grimm. Also, a new Gammiser that controls wind appears before Takeru. Deep Specter and Necrom are being attacked on all sides. Alain cannot stand the idea that he might not be able to protect the treasures of this world. Meanwhile, Bills attempts to put his own plan into action by attempting in on an idol, to which Akari decides to replace. Apparently, this plan is connected to his goals from his own childhood. In order to re-inspire belief, Sanzo sends Alain to a training field in another world. But Akari and Onari also seem to be targeted by Igor's plans as well...
37	"Mastered! Everyone's Paths!"; Transliteration: "Shūtoku! Sorezore no Michi!" (Japanese: 修得！それぞれの道！)	Koichi Sakamoto	Keiichi Hasegawa	June 26, 2016
After confirming that she hears other people’s thoughts, Takeru visits Honami’s group members once again in order to help. Honami hears their thoughts, still saying only bad things about her. On top of that, Igor has set a Gamma on her due to her power and she feels now, more than ever, like quitting for good. Alain, on his part, is on the verge of defeat as well in the trial world he was sent to by Sanzo. Akari, who for some reason passed the audition for harp+y 4, is now faced with Honami’s pressure but she decides to give her best. Meanwhile, Makoto encounters his other “self”, the one Kanon told him about. In the Gamma World, the Gammisers talk to Adel and tell him it is time to obtain new power.
38	"Return! The Souls of Heroes!"; Transliteration: "Fukkatsu! Eiyū no Tamashii!" (Japanese: 復活！英雄の魂！)	Koichi Sakamoto	Nobuhiro Mouri	July 3, 2016
Javel become frustrated due to him always losing. Meanwhile, Makoto encounters another one of his body double, while Takeru, who has his own problem with the heroes, have to fight Adel's new form. With the heroes defeated, will Takeru be able to win against Gyro who also challenged him? And will Onari be able to comfort Javel?
39	"Opposition! Father and Daughter!"; Transliteration: "Tairitsu! Chichi to Musume!" (Japanese: 対立！父と娘！)	Katsuya Watanabe	Takuro Fukuda	July 10, 2016
The meeting between Adel, Alia, and Igor ended in a bad disruption. Meanwhile, Takeru encounters a debate in the house of a Father and a daughter, and after arguing they were attacked by a Gammiser. The Gammiser appeared to look weak compared to the previous but the soul of the father and daughter swapped bodies. While the Dad was in the Gammiser's body, Mayu in her Dad's body, and the Gammiser in Mayu's body, can Takeru and the gang solve this mystery and find out what he's after? Not to mention, Billy the Kid has possessed Kanon......
40	"Courage! A Tragic Resolution!"; Transliteration: "Yūki! Hisō na Ketsudan!" (Japanese: 勇気！悲壮な決断！)	Katsuya Watanabe	Takuro Fukuda	July 17, 2016
In an effort to help Mayu and her Father - Shinichiro - Takeru and the others help Mayu to solve the source of a leak in her Father's workplace - which her Father's partner suspects is her Shinichiro...
41	"Upheaval! The Secretary's Decision!"; Transliteration: "Gekidō! Chōkan no Ketsudan!" (Japanese: 激動！長官の決断！)	Kyohei Yamaguchi	Keiichi Hasegawa	July 24, 2016
Takeru only has 19 days left. Feeling uneasy at the fact that he is apparently losing his humanity, he talks to Akari. She assures him that they will do whatever they can to help him revive. However, Takeru is troubled by his powerlessness. He calls the Hermit but Akari is infuriated at the old man's response. Beethoven possesses Akari in her rage, greatly increasing it and causing a ruckus at the Tenkuji Temple. Everyone tries to think of a solution. Meanwhile, in the Gamma world, Edith has decided to put a stop to Adel. He obtains an Eyecon when Adel tries to connect with the Great Eye, however he only managed to break the connection and send Adel into the human world. Adel and Edith fight. Takeru and the others come to his aid. Edith and Takeru's encounter will lead to the truth about the Gamma World.
42	"Astonishment! The Truth About the Hermit!"; Transliteration: "Gyōten! Sennin no Shinjitsu!" (Japanese: 仰天！仙人の真実！)	Kyohei Yamaguchi	Keiichi Hasegawa	July 31, 2016
Edith makes an attempt to stop Adel but had it not been for Takeru's intervention, he would have perished. At the Tenkuji Temple, Edith finally explains the workings of the Gamma world, whose origin is something completely unexpected for the rest. Edith was behind the creation of the Eyecons and the Gammaizers. Adel makes an appearance again and it is now Makoto who gives his all facing him. However, he is defeated and suffers major injuries. Adel tries to connect to the Great Eye again and he is rejected. Adel's anger now fully directed towards Takeru, he makes a third appearance in the human world and this time Alain faces him.
43	"Connection! The Boy Genius!"; Transliteration: "Setsuzoku! Tensai Shōnen!" (Japanese: 接続！天才少年！)	Ryuta Tasaki	Nobuhiro Mouri	August 7, 2016
The people at Tenkuji Temple have become united once again and are now joined by the Hermit/Edith. They pay a visit to Ryu's grave where Takeru vows that he will come back to life. Meanwhile, after losing to Takeru and destroying his Eyecon by himself, Adel returns to his real body and enters a dormant state. A new client visits the temple, saying that their child is behaving strangely. He is writing long, complicated mathematical equations and singing strange songs. Takeru and Onari go investigate but find something unexpected. Igor's Demia plan is about to be set into motion and a countdown begins. Adel connects with the power source.
44	"Activation! The Terror of Demia!"; Transliteration: "Kidō! Demia no Kyōfu!" (Japanese: 起動！デミアの恐怖！)	Ryuta Tasaki	Nobuhiro Mouri	August 14, 2016
Adel's plan is to use Demia to make the human world the same as the Gamma world. Takeru decides to start by destroying the Demia servers. Hiroki has had his soul and body separated. Takeru enters the memories of those connected to Demia. He transforms into Ghost Beethoven Damashii and uses music to help the people recover their memories but...
45	"Horror! A Disappearing World!"; Transliteration: "Senritsu! Kieyuku Sekai!" (Japanese: 戦慄！消えゆく世界！)	Katsuya Watanabe	Keiichi Hasegawa	August 21, 2016
Adel has connected to the Demia network and taken control of everyone with the intent of becoming a new world himself. In order to stop this, Takeru, Makoto, and Alain transform and face all the revived Gammaizers. In that moment, Takeru taps into Adel's childhood memories. What he sees surprises him... Takeru believes he can stop Adel's rampage by connecting with him. He tries but Adel responds by ordering the Gammaizers to eliminate them all.
46	"Duel! Words from the Swordsman!"; Transliteration: "Kettō! Kengō kara no Kotoba!" (Japanese: 決闘！剣豪からの言葉！)	Katsuya Watanabe	Keiichi Hasegawa	August 28, 2016
Everyone vows to do what they can while Takeru is invisible. Meanwhile, the Gammaizer want to evolve. They order Copy Makoto to study how humans convert feelings into power because Takeru is the key to everything. Takeru watches people get connected to the Demia network when suddenly he gets a headache from all the voices. Back at the temple, Copy Makoto comes back from training with the Eyecon but both Kanon and Alain feel this is not the real Makoto. Bills suggests they broadcast their warning to the world from the Deep Connect broadcast studio. The real Makoto walks in and everyone realizes the impostor was just there. Takeru returns to the rooftop and is met by Sonoda, Nagamasa and Yuki who are possessed by the Gammaizers. They transform into their Gammaizers forms. Makoto comes face to face with the copy in the forest. Takeru suddenly gets a headache again and is losing hope. But Musashi sucks him into the Eyecon to tell Takeru to believe in himself and his heart. Bills starts the live worldwide broadcast, but it’s too late. 90% of the world already has the Demia contacts. Adel hijacks the feed and tells the world that they will all be inside of him.
47	"Concord! Everyone's Resolutions!"; Transliteration: "Koō! Sorezore no Kakugo!" (Japanese: 呼応！それぞれの覚悟！)	Satoshi Morota	Takuro Fukuda	September 4, 2016
After evading its attacks, Ghost Mugen Damashii is able to connect with the Perfect Gammaizer. Takeru witnesses Adel's sad memories of losing his mother. Adel, on his part, connects with Takeru's sad memories of the loss of his father but the words he gives Takeru are completely unexpected… "I killed your father." Adel is Ryu's murderer?! Takeru becomes unable to hold back his rage.
48	"End! The Chain of Sorrow!"; Transliteration: "Shūketsu! Kanashimi no Rensa!" (Japanese: 終結！悲しみの連鎖！)	Satoshi Morota	Takuro Fukuda	September 11, 2016
Edith, as Kamen Rider Dark Ghost, welcomes Takeru, Makoto, Akari, Kanon, and Onari to the Gamma World and brings them to Adel but they are stopped by Igor and other Gamma. Igor approaches Akari and she decides to slap him repeatedly until he snaps out of it. A basic Gamma tries to sneak up behind Onari and Akari, but Igor sacrifices himself for them. Alain arrives in the round room and Adel just laughs at Alain's futile attempt at defeating him when they fight. Takeru arrives and watches the scene as Alain is about to kill himself, only to back out at the last minute and says he wants to connect Adel and Alain's hearts because they're family. Copy Makoto revives the real Makoto by merging with him. Adel remembers Adonis leaving the room for a minute and that is the moment Adel feels his father left their family to collapse. But Takeru shows Adel moments where Adonis talks to Edith about wanting to create a wonderful world for his children where there is no death or hunger or war. Adel ejects the Gammaizers from his body, but the Gammaizers begin to act on their own free will. They want to set their plan of replacing humans in motion, so they engulf and control Adel's body. Takeru transforms into Ghost Mugen Damashii and easily defeats Perfect Gammaizer proclaiming that Adel's soul will live on. Adel's ghost thanks Takeru. He also tells Alain to start his own family. And to Alia, thanks for everything. Everyone heads to the round room to find Edith lying on the floor and Freya floating in the Great Eye on the ceiling. She explains that the Gammaizers are trying to take over the Great Eye. Makoto predicts that Gammaizers are revived from Copy Makoto's Deep Specter Eyecon. The Gammaizers engulfs Freya and takes on a brand new form.
49	"Infinity! The Power of Humanity!"; Transliteration: "Mugen! Hito no Chikara!" (Japanese: 無限！人の力！)	Satoshi Morota	Takuro Fukuda	September 18, 2016
Takeru is on his last day of life as the Ganmaizers revive once again and assimilate Adel's body in order to create an entity completely fused with the Great Eye! The Ganmaizers have decided that humanity deserves to be eradicated, due to their inconclusive emotions and systems of logic and reasoning. Takeru is forced to watch them destroy large sections of the city! Makoto and Alain fail to stop them as their power is greater than normal! All hope lies in Takeru who tries to deal a final blow to the Ganmaizers but to no avail! They watch as they begin to make disappear, large numbers of people from the city... The Gammaizers, incorporating the Great Eye, appears in the human world from the Gamma World. Takeru chases after the Great Eyezer. Takeru transforms into Ghost Mugen Damashii and stands up to the Great Eyezer to have his attacks repelled. The Great Eyezer that triumphs then grows huge and becomes Eyezer Giant. It then starts to suck up everyone in the city. Although Takeru is despaired by "not being able to protect everyone's future" and has a sense of helplessness, he remembers the love his father and mother gave to him and he wakes up to this power of human love. Takeru then transforms into Ghost Mugen Damashii again and uses "Love Bomber" to disrupt the Eyezer Giant, thus weakening it and shrinking it back to normal size. Aligning the heroes and the power of 15, he defeats the last enemy! Takeru transforms into Ghost Ore Damashii and defeats the Great Eyezer once and for all! Takeru decides to use his wish to resurrect the taken people and the people of the Gamma World, and the Great Eye decides to reward Takeru for his kindness by restoring him to life. Takeru starts falling from the sky, for a few seconds making it appear like he is just going to die again, but is caught by the Damashii and escorted to the ground where he reunites and celebrates his resurrection with his friends, where he exclaims his hunger due to being human again. As the end credits roll, with the Eyecon system offline, the people in the Ganma world which including QB and Igor wake up from their capsules as Alia watches over them as she thanks Takeru. It is also revealed the Yurusen was the entire time just a cat, while Onari presents Takeru with his first meal after being resurrected: an onigiri, which the episode end with Takeru taking a bite out of it with happiness.
50 (Finale)	"Future! Connected Feelings!"; Transliteration: "Mirai! Tsunagaru Omoi!" (Japanese: 未来！繋がる想い！)	Osamu Kaneda	Takuro Fukuda	September 25, 2016
Takeru and the others go to Ryu's tomb to let him know that Takeru was able to revive. The Gammaizer menace is no more and everything has gone back to normal. Takeru has returned to school and is being helped by Akari to catch up with his studies. Alain looks up to the blue sky and makes a decision. Makoto, who with Kanon has seen off Takeru, lets his sister know of a decision of his own. A strange young boy holding a mysterious artifact appears and says: "The one with the power to change the world." What is the meaning of these words? The boy is attacked by the black Kamen Rider that appeared before.
