= Mayama =

Mayama may refer to:

== People ==
- Akihiro Mayama (born 1988), Japanese actor
- Miko Mayama (born 1939), American actress
- Rika Mayama (born 1996), Japanese idol singer (Shiritsu Ebisu Chugaku), voice actress

== Places ==
- Mayama District, a district in the Pool Region of south-eastern Republic of the Congo
