= Kobashi =

Kobashi (written: 小橋 or 古橋) is a Japanese surname. Notable people with the surname include:

- Ichita Kobashi (小橋 一太, 1870–1939), Japanese bureaucrat and politician
- Kenta Kobashi (小橋 建太, born 1967), Japanese professional wrestler
- Marika Kobashi (小橋マリカ, born 2001), Japanese professional wrestler
- Megumi Kobashi (小橋 めぐみ, born 1979), Japanese actress
- Renoir Kobashi (小橋 ルノワール, born 1973), French-Asian composer
- Yasuhide Kobashi (古橋 矢須秀, 1931–2003), Japanese woodblock print artist, painter, sculptor, and stage designer
