= Kamen Rider 1 (film) =

- Theatrical poster

Japanese name
- Kanji: 仮面ライダー１号
Transcriptions
- Revised Hepburn: Kamen Raidā Ichi-gō
- Directed by: Osamu Kaneda
- Screenplay by: Toshiki Inoue
- Based on: Kamen Rider by Shotaro Ishinomori
- Produced by: Noriko Kosakawa; Shinichirô Shirakura
- Starring: Hiroshi Fujioka; Shun Nishime; Natsumi Okamoto; Tsuyoshi Abe; Nao Nagasawa; Kozo Takeda; Hikaru Ohsawa; Ryosuke Yamamoto; Takayuki Yanagi; Naoto Takenaka; Ren Osugi
- Narrated by: Tomokazu Seki
- Cinematography: Kōji Kurata
- Edited by: Hideaki Ōhata
- Music by: Kōtarō Nakagawa; Shuhei Naruse; Go Sakabe
- Production companies: Toei Company; TV Asahi; Toei Video; Asatsu-DK; Toei Advertising; Bandai; Kinoshita Group; Sanki Worldwide
- Distributed by: Toei Company, Ltd.
- Release date: March 26, 2016
- Running time: 96 minutes
- Country: Japan
- Language: Japanese
- Box office: $4.7 million

Kamen Rider 1 (仮面ライダー1号, Kamen Raidā Ichigō) is a 2016 Japanese superhero film, produced to celebrate the 45th anniversary of the Kamen Rider Series and is part of Toei's "Super Hero Year" project. It features a team-up between the main protagonist of Kamen Rider and the cast of Kamen Rider Ghost.

== Plot ==
Tokyo is under attack by the evil Shocker organization, which is intent on capturing a girl named Mayu Tachibana. However, their plans are thwarted by Shocker Nova Co., Ltd. (ノバショッカー株式会社, Noba Shokkā Kabushiki-Gaisha), a splinter group bent on conquering the global economy instead of just world domination. Takeru Tenkūji arrives on the scene and helps Mayu escape, but is overwhelmed by the Nova Shocker general Wolga before Takeshi Hongo appears and dispatches the Shocker Combatmen. Back at Daitenkū-ji, Takeru, Akari Tsukimura, and Onari learn of the history of Shocker, and Akari deduces that Mayu is from Jōnan University Affiliated High School based on her school uniform during the attack. To know more about Mayu, Takeru and Akari go undercover at the university as teachers. One day after school, Akari and Mayu are attacked by Shocker when Takeshi once again intervenes and transforms into Kamen Rider 1. Following a brief reunion, Mayu slaps Takeshi and runs away.

After a brief conversation with Takeru, Akari, Onari, and Makoto Fukami, Takeshi goes to Mayu's class the next day to lecture about the value of life. After school, Takeshi and Mayu have a conversation, where Mayu is revealed to be the granddaughter of Takeshi's longtime friend Tobei Tachibana and she had held a grudge on Takeshi for not looking after her for the past three years. The two mend their relationship as uncle and niece, despite Takeshi's financial burden. Meanwhile, Nova Shocker fires an electromagnetic pulse that causes a blackout and mass panic throughout the country while Shocker reveals that they need Mayu as a sacrificial lamb for their great leader, Ambassador Hell. Takeru and Makoto rush to the park to ask Takeshi for his help in solving the blackout anomaly, but Mayu convinces Takeshi to keep his promise to never fight again. Kamen Rider Ghost and Kamen Rider Specter arrive at Nova Shocker's headquarters, but are once again overwhelmed by the generals Wolga, Eagla, and Buffal.

The next morning, Nova Shocker force the Prime Minister to sign a contract that binds the Japanese government with their organization in exchange for the restoration of electricity with their Nova Energy, only to cause mass power outages and pollution. Takeru, Akari, and Onari find Takeshi by a log cabin to once again ask for his help, but Takeshi has them do primitive chores instead. Takeshi suddenly collapses, as years of fighting Shocker have taken their toll on his body. Mayu realizes that he did not abandon her, but traveled the world to protect it from Shocker. The cabin is attacked by Shocker, led by a revived Ambassador Hell. Takeshi fends off against the Combatmen, but his body gives out as Ambassador Hell captures Mayu and prepares her for the sacrificial ritual. Ambassador Hell reveals that he was given the Eyecon of Alexander the Great and placed it in Mayu's body for it to mature so he may wield its power. The ceremony is disrupted by Nova Shocker, ensuing a three-way battle between the Shocker groups and the Kamen Riders. The Alexander Eyecon is released from Mayu's body, but is captured by Wolga. Takeshi saves Mayu, but is mortally wounded by a shockwave emitted by Wolga's new power. His body is cremated that night while Kamen Rider Ghost and Kamen Rider Specter battle Nova Shocker before a possessed Wolga slays Eagla. Hearing the cries of his niece, Takeshi suddenly emerges from his fiery grave and goes to an old barn to pick up his Neo Cyclone. Takeru and Makoto, along with Ambassador Hell, are outmatched by Wolga and Buffal when Takeshi suddenly rushes in to even the odds. With the help of Kamen Rider 1, Kamen Rider Ghost kills Buffal. Wolga mortally wounds Ambassador Hell, but the three Kamen Riders finish him off with their Rider Kicks. With his dying breath, Ambassador Hell destroys the Alexander Eyecon as Takeshi rides off into the sunset.

Takeshi returns by the cliffs to tell Takeru, Akari, Onari, and Mayu that he must once again leave Japan to continue his fight. Takeru tells him that he will always be his hero.

== Cast ==
- Takeshi Hongo (本郷 猛, Hongō Takeshi): Hiroshi Fujioka (藤岡 弘、, Fujioka Hiroshi)
- Takeru Tenkūji (天空寺 タケル, Tenkūji Takeru): Shun Nishime (西銘 駿, Nishime Shun)
- Mayu Tachibana (立花 麻由, Tachibana Mayu): Natsumi Okamoto (岡本 夏美, Okamoto Natsumi)
- Wolga (ウルガ, Uruga): Tsuyoshi Abe (阿部 力, Abe Tsuyoshi)
- Eagla (イーグラ, Īgura): Nao Nagasawa (長澤 奈央, Nagasawa Nao)
- Buffal (バッファル, Baffaru): Kozo Takeda (武田 幸三, Takeda Kōzō)
- Akari Tsukimura (月村 アカリ, Tsukimura Akari): Hikaru Ohsawa (大沢 ひかる, Ōsawa Hikaru))
- Makoto Fukami (深海 マコト, Fukami Makoto): Ryosuke Yamamoto (山本 涼介, Yamamoto Ryōsuke)
- Onari (御成): Takayuki Yanagi (柳 喬之, Yanagi Takayuki)
- Shocker Combatman (ショッカー戦闘員, Shokkā Sentōin): Udai Iwasaki (岩崎 う大, Iwasaki Udai; Kamomental), Yūsuke Makio (槙尾 ユウスケ, Makio Yūsuke; Kamomental)
- Prime minister: Katsuhiko Yokomitsu (横光 克彦, Yokomitsu Katsuhiko)
- Hermit (仙人, Sennin): Naoto Takenaka (竹中 直人, Takenaka Naoto)
- Shibuya (シブヤ): Takuya Mizoguchi (溝口 琢矢, Mizoguchi Takuya)
- Narita (ナリタ): Reo Kansyuji (勧修寺 玲旺, Kanshūji Reo)
- Ambassador Hell (地獄大使, Jigoku-taishi): Ren Osugi (大杉 漣, Ōsugi Ren)
- Yurusen (ユルセン; Voice): Aoi Yūki (悠木 碧, Yūki Aoi)
- Alexander Eyecon (アレクサンダー眼魂, Arekusandā Aikon; Voice): Shōzō Iizuka (飯塚 昭三, Iizuka Shōzō)
- Shiomaneking (シオマネキング, Shiomanekingu; Voice), Ganikomol (ガニコウモル, Ganikōmoru; Voice), Poison Lizard Man (毒トカゲ男, Dokutokage Otoko; Voice): Tomokazu Seki (関 智一, Seki Tomokazu)
- Mysterious Gamma (謎の眼魔, Nazo no Ganma; Voice): Kōji Ishii (石井 康嗣, Ishii Kōji)

== Theme songs ==
Ending themes

- "Let's Go!! Rider Kick -2016 movie ver.-" (レッツゴー!!ライダーキック -2016 movie ver.-, Rettsu Gō!! Raidā Kikku -Nisenjūroku mūbī bājon-)
  - Lyrics: Shotaro Ishinomori
  - Composition: Shunsuke Kikuchi
  - Arrangement: Cher Watanabe
  - Artist: Rider Chips
- "Sorezore no Toki" (それぞれの時; "Each One's Time")
  - Lyrics: Gorō Matsui
  - Composition & Arrangement: Masaaki Mori
  - Artist: Goro Noguchi & Akane Takayanagi
