= Kamen Rider × Kamen Rider Ghost & Drive: Super Movie War Genesis =

- Theatrical poster

Japanese name
- Kanji: 仮面ライダー×仮面ライダー ゴースト&ドライブ 超MOVIE大戦ジェネシス
Transcriptions
- Revised Hepburn: Kamen Raidā × Kamen Raidā Gōsuto Ando Doraibu Chō Mūbī Taisen Jeneshisu
- Directed by: Osamu Kaneda
- Written by: Makoto Hayashi
- Based on: Kamen Rider Ghost by Takuro Fukuda
- Starring: Shun Nishime; Ryoma Takeuchi; Ryosuke Yamamoto; Taiko Katono; Yu Inaba; Hikaru Ohsawa; Rio Uchida; Takayuki Yanagi
- Music by: Go Sakabe; Shuhei Naruse; Kōtarō Nakagawa
- Production company: Toei Films
- Release date: December 12, 2015 (Japan)
- Running time: 83 minutes
- Country: Japan
- Language: Japanese
- Box office: US$6.5 million

Kamen Rider × Kamen Rider Ghost & Drive: Super Movie War Genesis (仮面ライダー×仮面ライダー ゴースト&ドライブ 超MOVIE大戦ジェネシス, Kamen Raidā × Kamen Raidā Gōsuto Ando Doraibu Chō Mūbī Taisen Jeneshisu) is a 2015 Japanese film in the Kamen Rider Series. It serves as a crossover between the television series Kamen Rider Ghost and Kamen Rider Drive. The film features the series' two lead heroes traveling back in time due to the machinations of an evil monster. The film was released nationally in Japan on December 12, 2015.

== Story ==
Three months after the Roidmude threat has ended and the Drive arsenal sealed away, having brought a wedding ring to propose to Kiriko with, Shinnosuke Tomari attempts to move on with his life when he is "arrested" by Kiriko and taken to Otta's office. Shinnosuke agrees in taking a special assignment to investigate a series of paranormal crimes that have Akari Tsukimura and Onari present at each scene. Reaching the Daitenkū-ji temple, Shinnosuke and Kiriko interview Onari and Akari as they explain they are Ghost Hunters with the latter having a scientific means to confirm their existence. However, the Gamma Superior behind the thefts steals the Musashi Ghost Eyecon and a furious Takeru Tenkūji transforms into Kamen Rider Ghost to attack the ghost. With Kiriko assuming Takeru to be the culprit as neither she nor Shinnosuke can see the Ganma, the misunderstanding worsens when Kamen Riders Mach and Specter join the fray while the former gives Shinnosuke a Mach Driver Honoh and the Deadheat Shift Car to fight as Kamen Rider Deadheat Drive. Luckily, Akari uses the Shiranui to expose the Gamma who is quickly destroyed by the Kamen Riders with Ghost reclaiming his Eyecon. Following Takeru explaining himself to Shinnosuke, a tremor occurs that causes a wormhole to appear on the monolith. Takeru sees an image of his father Ryū Tenkūji before he and Shinnosuke are sucked in with the Condor Denwor.

Finding themselves in Daitenkū-ji 10 years in the past, along with a past version of Mr. Belt, Shinnosuke and Takeru present themselves as eager disciples wanting to become Ghost Hunters under Ryū. After a harsh training in meditation, Takeru spot his childhood self with Akari before the two run off to the museum where an exhibition of Leonardo da Vinci's work is being held. Though the children find the museum closed, they sneak in and find the Mona Lisa which Akari marveled while expressing her wish to become a genius like Leonardo when she grows up. When Takeru says she'll stay the same, Akari scolds him about having no dreams and that he can't became a Ghost Hunter like his dad with the boy not wanting to. When a security guard finds them, a Ganma abducts Akari while possessing the guard before being intercepted by Ryū. Takeru and Shinnosuke arrive as the Ganma reveals himself as the Raffaello Ganma, transforming into Kamen Riders Ghost and Zero Drive. After the Raffaello Ganma is destroyed, Ryū considers the two promising apprentices. The two later get a call on the Condor Denwor from their friends in the future, Kiriko and Go alerting Shinnosuke that the Roidmudes were revived with Heart, Brain, and Medic leading their attack. While this turn of events might be a consequence of him and Shinnosuke coming to Ryu's aid, Takeru is more bothered that the date is December 19: The day Ryū is to die.

After Takeru wakes from a nightmare, told by the latter they should not change the timeline any further, he and Shinnosuke are altered by his past self that Ryū left. The two Kamen Riders find Ryū as he attempted to stop the Michelangelo Gamma from spiriting young Akari. Bringing Ryū back to the temple after taking out Michelangelo, Takeru and Shinnosuke learn the Ganma are incarnations of the actual Renaissance Artisians who seek to create revive Leonardo as a Ganma through Akari's feelings and an Eyecon. When he sees his younger self insisting Ryū to save Akari, Takeru loses it as he tells his younger self to save Akari himself. Ryu gives Young Takeru his book and Musashi's Katana to use. Back in the present, Specter and Mach do their best to deal with the Roidmudes as they are joined by a revived Chase. But the Roidmudes are joined by the Leonardo Gamma, who easily kills Honganji when he attempted to join the fray as Kamen Rider Jun. But Honganji comes to life during a funeral held in Daitenkū-ji, revealing that he saw a Hermit while in limbo who advises him to return to the land of the living as his talents would only go to waste in the afterlife. Suddenly Makoto receive a phone call from Takeru on his Cobra Keitai. Takeru ask Akari if she was held hostage from Gamma 10 years ago. But Akari has no such memory as Rinna decides to find the memory herself using her science.

In the past, after Takeru places the Raffaello and Michelangelo Eyecons in a time capsule along with the wedding ring Shinnosuke intended to give Kiriko with the latter contacting their friends, they learn from Akari of the abandoned cathedral she was held at 10 years ago. The two Kamen Riders, Ryū, and young Takeru reach Akari, but are too late to prevent Da Vinci Ganma's creation as he creates an army of Assault Gammas. As the others deal with the Ganmas, Young Takeru saves Akari before Ryū takes the children to safety as Ghost and Zero Drive seemingly destroy Leonardo. But when young Takeru attempts to claim Da Vinci Gamma Eyecon, the Ganma is revealed to be still active as Ryū takes a deathblow intended for his son. Leonardo then departs for the future with Shinnosuke dragging a reluctant Takeru, learning Ryū knew he is his son's future self, back to their time through the monolith's wormhole as the Young Takeru weeps over his father's dead body. Returning to the present to find the Roidmudes erased with the timeline restored, Masato and Goh having assumed that the Ganma faded with them, Takeru and Shinnosuke reveal that Leonardo is alive as Onari comes in to alert the gang that an army of Ganma led by Leonardo is approaching Daitenkū-ji.

Explaining that he waited 10 years to settle things with Takeru and Shinnosoke, Leonardo revives Raffaello and Michelangelo Gammas to fight by his side. When Mr. Belt makes an unexpected appearance, Shinnosuke joins the others as he becomes Kamen Rider Drive. The Kamen Riders proceed to obliterate the Gamma Army with their friends joining the fray, but Leonardo combines with Raffaello and Michelangelo to transform into the gigantic Renaissance Gamma with the intention of reshaping the world in his image while raining fire down on the Kamen Riders. Things appear helpless when Ryu's spirit appears before Takeru and merges with the Eyecons to form the Toucon Boost Eyecon so Ghost can use to become Kamen Rider Ghost Toucon Boost Damashii while Drive assumes Type Tridoron form. Using the Iguana Ghostriker after it is augmented with the Ride Booster Set, the two Kamen Riders manage to destroy Renaissance Gamma with the world restored to normal. Ryu's spirit then departs with Takeru promising to continue as the group are watched by a mysterious green Kamen Rider. Soon after indirectly asking for her hand in marriage, Shinnosuke and Kiriko marry with their wedding attended by their colleagues, the Daitenkū-ji attendants and the Tokyo Metropolitan Police Department officers.

== Casting and production ==
Japanese comedian Kendo Kobayashi provides the voice for the film's main antagonist, the Da Vinci Gamma. Kobayashi said that he was always a fan of Kamen Rider as a child, having fond memories watching reruns of the original Kamen Rider and watching up to The New Kamen Rider (Skyrider). The film's other new antagonists, the Raphael Gamma and the Michelangelo Gamma, are voiced by Jiro and Shinobu Hasegawa of the owarai comedy duo Sissone, respectively. It was both men's first attempt at doing voiceover work.

The film also briefly features Kamen Rider Ghost's third Kamen Rider character, Kamen Rider Necrom, prior to his debut in the TV series.

== Cast ==
- Takeru Tenkūji (天空寺 タケル, Tenkūji Takeru): Shun Nishime (西銘 駿, Nishime Shun)
- Shinnosuke Tomari (泊 進ノ介, Tomari Shin'nosuke): Ryoma Takeuchi (竹内 涼真, Takeuchi Ryōma)
- Makoto Fukami (深海 マコト, Fukami Makoto): Ryosuke Yamamoto (山本 涼介, Yamamoto Ryōsuke)
- Chase (チェイス, Cheisu): Taiko Katono (上遠野 太洸, Katōno Taikō)
- Go Shijima (詩島 剛, Shijima Gō): Yu Inaba (稲葉 友, Inaba Yū)
- Akari Tsukimura (月村 アカリ, Tsukimura Akari): Hikaru Ohsawa (大沢 ひかる, Ōsawa Hikaru)
- Kiriko Shijima (詩島 霧子, Shijima Kiriko): Rio Uchida (内田 理央, Uchida Rio)
- Onari (御成): Takayuki Yanagi (柳 喬之, Yanagi Takayuki)
- Rinna Sawagami (沢神 りんな, Sawagami Rinna): Rei Yoshii (吉井 怜, Yoshii Rei)
- Kyu Saijo (西城 究, Saijō Kyū), Kenta Hamano (浜野 謙太, Hamano Kenta)
- Genpachiro Otta (追田 現八郎, Otta Genpachirō): Taira Imata (井俣 太良, Imata Taira)
- Shibuya (シブヤ): Takuya Mizoguchi (溝口 琢矢, Mizoguchi Takuya)
- Narita (ナリタ): Reo Kansyuji (勧修寺 玲旺, Kanshūji Reo)
- Young Takeru: Hinata Yamada (山田 日向, Yamada Hinata)
- Young Akari: Chinami Yoshioka (吉岡 千波, Yoshioka Chinami)
- Brain (ブレン, Buren): Shota Matsushima (松島 庄汰, Matsushima Shōta)
- Medic (メディック, Medikku): Fumika Baba (馬場 ふみか, Baba Fumika)
- Heart (ハート, Hāto): Tomoya Warabino (蕨野 友也, Warabino Tomoya)
- Alain (アラン, Aran): Hayato Isomura (磯村 勇斗, Isomura Hayato)
- Chikara Saionji (西園寺 主税, Saionji Chikara): Yoshiyuki Morishita (森下 能幸, Morishita Yoshiyuki)
- Security guard: Taihei Katō (加藤 泰平, Katō Taihei; TV Asahi announcer)
- Sataka (佐高): Taiki Fujioka (藤岡 大樹, Fujioka Taiki)
- Ryū Tenkūji (天空寺 龍, Tenkūji Ryū): Kazuhiko Nishimura (西村 和彦, Nishimura Kazuhiko)
- Hermit (仙人, Sennin): Naoto Takenaka (竹中 直人, Takenaka Naoto)
- Jun Honganji (本願寺 純, Honganji Jun): Tsurutaro Kataoka (片岡 鶴太郎, Kataoka Tsurutarō)

=== Voiceover roles ===
- Mr. Belt (ベルトさん, Beruto-san): Chris Peppler (クリス・ペプラー, Kurisu Pepurā)
- Yurusen (ユルセン): Aoi Yūki (悠木 碧, Yūki Aoi)
- Gamma Superior (眼魔スペリオル, Ganma Superioru): Yasuhiro Takato (高戸 靖広, Takato Yasuhiro)
- Da Vinci Gamma (ダヴィンチ眼魔, Da Vinchi Ganma): Kendo Kobayashi (ケンドーコバヤシ, Kendō Kobayashi)
- Raphael Gamma (ラファエロ眼魔, Rafaero Ganma): Jiro (じろう, Jirō; Sissonne)
- Michelangelo Gamma (ミケランジェロ眼魔, Mikeranjero Ganma): Shinobu Hasegawa (長谷川 忍, Hasegawa Shinobu; Sissonne)
- Ghost Driver Equipment Voice: m.c.A.T

== Theme song ==
- "Hajimari no Hi" (はじまりの日; "The Day of Beginning")
  - Composition: 1 Finger, Takashi Morio
  - Arrangement: Takashi Morio
  - Lyrics & Artist: 1 Finger
