= Ryosuke Yamamoto (actor) =

Japanese actor and model

- 山本 涼介
- Born: May 15, 1995 (age 30); Nara Prefecture, Japan
- Occupations: Actor, model
- Years active: 2010 - present
- Agent: Ken-On

Ryosuke Yamamoto (山本 涼介, Yamamoto Ryōsuke; born May 15, 1995, in Nara Prefecture, Japan) is a Japanese actor and model who is represented by the talent agency Ken-On. He graduated from Horikoshi High School.

== Biography ==
Yamamoto is a football student and he is the goalie. In his junior high school he was elected to be one of the representative players of Nara.

In 2009, Yamamoto was submitted by his mother to the Mitsubishi Pencil Style Fit Boy Contest and won among 1,500 people. He later became a finalist in the 22nd Junon Super Boy Contest. Yamamoto became one of the members of Ken-On's project Ken-On Nikutai Kaizō-bu and appeared in the event Men-On Style in 2012.

In the summer of 2013, he was elected in the nationwide audition for Fuji Television's United States of Odaiba and was placed in charge of Orange. He was also put in the movie "As The Gods Will" as Taira. Yamamoto passed the 29th Men's Non-no Model audition. He became an exclusive model of Men's Non-no.

Yamamoto competed twice in the Obstacle Course contest program Sasuke, however he never completed the First Stage. He was disqualified in the 2014 tournament after failing the Jump Hang Kai and from the 2015 tournament after failing the Orugōru (translated as the Music Box) before he could reach the Jump Hang Kai again.

In 2015, Yamamoto made regular appearances as Makoto Fukami/Kamen Rider Specter in Kamen Rider Ghost

== Filmography ==
=== TV series ===
Year	Title	Role	Network	Notes
2011	Hanazakari no Kimitachi e	Akira Kiyoshikojin	Fuji TV	
2012	Perfect Son		NTV	
2012	My Mommy is a Ghost!	Motojiro Kobayashi	NTV	NTV
2013	Neo Ultra Q	Yuma Honda	WOWOW	Episode 10
2013	Undercover Agent Lizard	Masato Makihara	TBS	
2014	Asunaro Sansan'nanabyōshi	Yoshihiko Sonoda	Fuji TV	
2014	Doctors 3 Saikyō no Meii	Mikio Suda	TV Asahi	Episode 4
2014	Sasuke	Himself	TBS	Competitor, Failed at Jump Hang Kai in Stage 1
2015	3ttsu no Machi no Monogatari		TBS	
2015	Sasuke	Himself	TBS	Competitor, Failed at Orugōru in Stage 1
2015–16	Kamen Rider Ghost	Makoto Fukami/Kamen Rider Specter	TV Asahi	
2017	Rikuoh	Yoshida	TBS	
2018	Investor Z	Shinji Fujita	TV Tokyo	
2018	Kamen Rider Zi-O	Makoto Fukami/Kamen Rider Specter	TV Asahi	Episode 14
2018	Gekiatsu!! Yankee Sakka-bu		TV Asahi	
2018	The Guide to Late Night Bad Love	[Ryo's office colleague]	TV Asahi	Episode 3, 6, 8
2019	Maison de Police	Hideyuki Nurui	TBS	Episode 4
2019	Noble Boys	Date Tatsunari	Tokyo MX	
2019	Our Dearest Sakura	convenient store customer	NTV	Episode 9

=== Filmography ===
Year	Title	Role	Notes
2014	Say "I love you"	Masashi Tachikawa	
2014	Kami-sama no Iu Toori	Mikinori Taira	
2015	Samulife		
2015	Kamen Rider × Kamen Rider Ghost & Drive: Super Movie War Genesis	Makoto Fukami/Kamen Rider Specter	
2016	Kamen Rider 1	Makoto Fukami/Kamen Rider Specter	
2016	Kamen Rider Ghost: The 100 Eyecons and Ghost's Fated Moment	Makoto Fukami/Kamen Rider Specter	
2018	Hold On, Baseball Team!	Natsuki Miyata	
2018	The Travelling Cat Chronicles	Kosuke Sawada	
2018	Neet Neet Neet	Takashi	
2019	JK Rock	Jyo Kodukai	
