= Shun Nishime =

Japanese actor and model (born 1998)

- 西銘 駿
- Nishime in 2019
- Born: February 20, 1998 (age 28); Gushikawa, Okinawa Prefecture, Japan
- Occupations: Actor, model
- Years active: 2014–present
- Agent: G-Star.Pro
- Height: 173 cm (5 ft 8 in)

Shun Nishime (西銘 駿, Nishime Shun; born February 20, 1998, in Gushikawa, Okinawa Prefecture, Japan) is a Japanese actor and model. His nickname is "Shun-Shun" (しゅんしゅん). He won the Grand Prix at the 27th Junon Super Boy Contest.

== Biography ==
Nishime was born in 1998 in Gushikawa, Okinawa Prefecture. He lived in Nagano Prefecture from 3 to 5 years old and returned to Gushikawa. After graduating from junior high school, he moved to Tokyo in order to become an actor. While aiming to be an actor, he lived in his aunt's house and attended a Tokyo high school. In 2014, he won the Grand Prix at the 27th Junon Super Boy Contest while during his second grade high school.

In 2015, he was appointed as the lead role in Kamen Rider Ghost. As starring alone, he is the youngest lead role tying with Takeru Satoh (Kamen Rider Den-O)

== Filmography ==
=== Films ===
Year	Title	Role	Notes
2015	Kamen Rider Drive: Surprise Future	Kamen Rider Ghost (voice)	Acting debut Cameo (uncredited)
2015	Kamen Rider × Kamen Rider Ghost & Drive: Super Movie War Genesis	Takeru Tenkuji/Kamen Rider Ghost	Lead role
2016	Kamen Rider 1	Takeru Tenkuji/Kamen Rider Ghost	Lead role
2016	Kamen Rider Ghost: The 100 Eyecons and Ghost's Fated Moment	Takeru Tenkuji/Kamen Rider Ghost	Lead role
2016	Kamen Rider Heisei Generations: Dr. Pac-Man vs. Ex-Aid & Ghost with Legend Rider	Takeru Tenkuji/Kamen Rider Ghost	Lead role
2017	Kamen Rider Heisei Generations Final: Build & Ex-Aid with Legend Rider	Takeru Tenkuji/Kamen Rider Ghost	Lead role
2018	Kamen Rider Heisei Generations Forever	Kamen Rider Ghost (voice)	Cameo

=== TV series ===
Year	Title	Role	Network	Notes
2015	Kamen Rider Drive	Kamen Rider Ghost (voice)	TV Asahi	Guest (Episodes 47–48)
2015	Kamen Rider Ghost	Takeru Tenkūji / Kamen Rider Ghost	TV Asahi	Lead role
2016	Doubutsu Sentai Zyuohger	Takeru Tenkūji / Kamen Rider Ghost	TV Asahi	Episode 7
2018	Kamen Rider Zi-O	Takeru Tenkūji / Kamen Rider Ghost	TV Asahi	Episodes 12–14
