= Takayuki Yanagi =

Japanese actor (born 1990)

David Takayuki Yanagi
- 柳 喬之
- Born: August 6, 1990 (age 35); Los Angeles, CA, United States
- Occupations: Actor, model
- Years active: 2012 - present
- Agent: Box Corporation
- Height: 1.85 m (6 ft 1 in)
- Website: Box Corporation

David Takayuki Yanagi (柳 喬之, Yanagi Takayuki; born August 6, 1990 in Los Angeles, CA, United States) is a Japanese actor and model, who is represented by Box Corporation.

== Personal life ==
Yanagi is non-binary.

== Filmography ==
=== TV series ===
Year	Title	Role	Network	Notes	Ref.
2013	Kumo no Kaidan		NTV	Episode 5	
2013	Kamen Teacher	Takashi Toda	NTV		
2013	Onmyō-ya e Yōkoso		Fuji TV	Episodes 6 and 7	
2013	Shūmatsu Metro Porishan		Tokyo MX		
2014	Shitsuren Chocolatier		Fuji TV	Episode 1	
2014	Border		TV Asahi	Episode 7	
2014	Kuu Neru Futari Sumu Futari		NHK BS Premium	Episode 8	
2014	ST Aka to Shiro no Sōsa File		NTV	Episode 2	
2014	Saigo ni Dare ka to Darekaga Kisuwosuru		YouTube		
2014	Watashitachi ga Propose sa Renai no ni wa, 101 no Riyū ga Atteda na		LaLa TV		
2014	Mission 001: Minnade Space Invader		TV Tokyo		
2015	Date: Koi to wa Donna Mono Kashira		Fuji TV	Episode 2	
2015	Ningen Kansatsu Meeting Drama Tadaima Kaigi-chū		NHK E TV	Episode 7	
2015	Yokoku-han: The Pain		WOWOW		
2015	Tokyo Nadeshiko		TV Tokyo	Episode 9	
2015	Ōyama Mōde		BS Japan		
2015	Kamen Rider Ghost	Onari	TV Asahi		

=== Films ===
Year	Title	Role	Notes
2013	Ikenie no Dilemma	Shoichiro Fujibayashi	
2014	Wood Job!: Nānā Kamisari		
2015	Kamen Rider × Kamen Rider Ghost & Drive: Super Movie War Genesis	Onari	
2016	Kamen Rider 1	Onari	
2016	Kamen Rider Ghost: The 100 Eyecons and Ghost's Fated Moment	Onari	
2016	Kamen Rider Heisei Generations: Dr. Pac-Man vs. Ex-Aid & Ghost with Legend Riders	Onari	
2017	Kamen Rider Ghost RE:BIRTH: Kamen Rider Specter	Onari	
2017	Kamen Rider Heisei Generations Final: Build & Ex-Aid with Legend Rider	Onari	

=== Advertisements ===
Title	Notes
Sony Computer Entertainment "Kyōtō Sensei"	
Japan Racing Association "The GI Story"	
Circle K Sankusu "+K Rakuten Point Card"	
"Viber"	
"Mini John Cooper Works"	
Mitsuya Fruit Cider "Kaeri no Sōdan"	
Kyocera "Digno M"	

=== Direct-to-video ===
Title	Role	Notes
Shibito no Koiwazurai	Shinjo	

=== Music videos ===
Year	Title	Notes
	Kerakera "Sayonara Daisukidatta yo"	
2013	Uura "Dramatic Cover Tokushū"	
	HY "Kai Itai"	
	Yo Hitoto "Tanin no Kankei feat. Soil & 'Pimp' Sessions"	
2015	Lotte Sweet Films "My Name"	
	Kobukuro "Hana"	

=== Stage shows ===
Year	Title	Role	Notes
2012	Kissa Bogī	Robin Edogawa	
2012	The Night of Christmouse	Yoshio Ogiwara	
2013	14-banme no Tsuki: Bokutachi ga Kijo o Kirei ni Shimasu!!		
2013	Nettai Danshi 2		
2015	Romance 2015		

=== Video games ===
Year	Title	Role	Notes
2023	Wild Hearts	Tamakazura	English version

=== Magazines ===
Year	Title	Notes
2013	Smart Suit Bible	
2013	CM Now Boys Vol. 3	
2013	Cast-Prix Zero Vol. 28	
2013	Gekkan De View	
2014	CM Now Boys Vol. 4	
2014	Shūkatsu Kumamoto 2015	
2015	CM Now Boys	
	Nishino ni Sekai wa Muridarou	Cover model
