= Go Sakabe =

Japanese composer (born 1982)

- 坂部 剛
- Born: 31 January 1982 (age 44); Japan
- Education: Department of Composition, Kunitachi College of Music
- Occupations: Composer; arranger
- Years active: 2005–present
- Musical career
- Genres: Soundtrack; electronic; classical; Orchestral; rock; J-pop; anison
- Instruments: Piano; keyboard
- Label: Ash Bunny
- Website: www.ashbunny.com/artist-go-sakabe

Go Sakabe (坂部 剛, Sakabe Gō; born 31 January 1982) is a Japanese composer and arranger. He has provided the music for several anime series, such as Date A Live and Digimon Adventure tri., as well as television dramas and movies—especially tokusatsu—, such as the Kamen Rider series. His works also include opening and ending theme songs for many series and video games.

== Biography ==
Sakabe was born in Japan, in 1982. He began learning piano in the first grade of elementary school. Around his junior high school, he used to compose songs at home, using the music notation software Finale. In high school, he joined the choir club and became more familiar with music. In the winter of his second year of high school, he decided to go to a music college, and later entered the Department of Composition at Kunitachi College of Music. After that, Sakabe studied under composer Toshihiko Sahashi while working as his assistant.

Sakabe's musician career started in 2005, with him involved in writing songs for other artists.

In 2007, he made his debut as a series composer with the opening theme song "I Say Yes" from the season 2 of the anime The Familiar of Zero.

== Works ==
=== Anime ===
Year	Title	Role(s)	Note(s)
2007	The Familiar of Zero Season 2	Opening theme song composer	
2010	Yumeiro Patissiere SP Professional	Ending theme song composer	
2011	Gosick	Opening and ending theme song composer and arranger	
2012	Strike Witches: The Movie	Theme song composer and arranger	
2013	Date A Live	Composer; Opening theme song composer and arranger	
2013	Chronicles of the Going Home Club	Composer	
2014	SoniAni: Super Sonico the Animation	Composer	
2014	Date A Live II	Composer; Opening theme song composer and arranger	
2014	Wolf Girl and Black Prince	Composer	
2015	World Break: Aria of Curse for a Holy Swordsman	Composer	
2015	Date A Live: Mayuri Judgement	Composer	
2015	Digimon Adventure tri. Part 1: Reunion	Composer	
2016	Digimon Adventure tri. Part 2: Determination	Composer	
2016	First Love Monster	Composer; Ending theme song composer and arranger	
2016	Digimon Adventure tri. Part 3: Confession	Composer	
2016	Cheating Craft	Composer; Opening theme song composer and arranger	
2016	Kiss Him, Not Me	Ending theme song composer and arranger	
2016	Magic-kyun! Renaissance	Composer	
2017	Digimon Adventure tri. Part 4: Loss	Composer	
2017	Digimon Adventure tri. Part 5: Coexistence	Composer	
2018	Basilisk: The Ouka Ninja Scrolls	Composer	
2018	Digimon Adventure tri. Part 6: Future	Composer	
2018	Reizouko no Tsukenosuke!	Composer	
2019	Forest of Piano Season 2	Ending theme song composer and arranger	
2019	Date A Live III	Composer; Opening theme song composer and arranger	
2019	The Idolmaster Cinderella Girls: Climax Season	Ending theme song composer and arranger	
2019	Bakumatsu Crisis	Composer	Other tracks by Ryo Kawasaki
2020	Date A Bullet: Dead or Bullet	Composer; Opening and ending theme song composer and arranger	
2020	Date A Bullet: Nightmare or Queen	Composer; Opening theme song composer and arranger	
2021	LBX Girls	Composer	
2021	Kiyo in Kyoto: From the Maiko House	Composer	
2022	She Professed Herself Pupil of the Wise Man	Composer	
2022	Date A Live IV	Composer; Opening and ending theme song composer and arranger	
2023	Kizuna no Allele	Composer	
2024	Re:Monster	Composer	
2024	Date A Live V	Composer	
2025	I Left My A-Rank Party to Help My Former Students Reach the Dungeon Depths!	Composer	

=== Television dramas ===
Year	Title	Note(s)
2015	Kamen Rider Ghost	
2018	Mob Psycho 100 (television drama)	
2019	4 Week Continuous Special Super Sentai Strongest Battle!!	Other tracks by Koichiro Kameyama, Kousuke Yamashita, Kei Haneoka, Hiroshi Takaki, Kotaro Nakagawa and Eiji Kawamura
2019	Kamen Rider Zero-One	
2021	Ultraman Trigger: New Generation Tiga	
2023	Ohsama Sentai King-Ohger	
2024	Kamen Rider Gavv	
2025	Kamen Rider ZEZTZ	With Hiroshi Takaki

=== Movies ===
Year	Title	Note(s)
2015	Kamen Rider × Kamen Rider Ghost & Drive: Super Movie War Genesis	Other tracks by Shuhei Naruse and Kotaro Nakagawa
2016	Kamen Rider 1	Other tracks by Shuhei Naruse and Kotaro Nakagawa
2016	Kamen Rider Ghost: The 100 Eyecons and Ghost's Fated Moment	
2016	Kamen Rider Heisei Generations: Dr. Pac-Man vs. Ex-Aid & Ghost with Legend Rider	Other tracks by ats-, Takehito Shimizu and Toru Watanabe
2017	Ghost Re:Birth: Kamen Rider Specter	
2017	Hurricane Polymar (2017 movie)	
2019	Kamen Rider Reiwa: The First Generation	Other tracks by Toshihiko Sahashi
2020	Kamen Rider Zero-One the Movie: Real×Time	
2021	Zero-One Others: Kamen Rider MetsubouJinrai	
2021	Zero-One Others: Kamen Rider Vulcan & Valkyrie	

=== Video games ===
Year	Title	Role(s)	Note(s)
2013	Date A Live: Rinne Utopia	Opening and ending theme song composer and arranger	
2014	Date A Live: Ars Install	Composer; Opening theme song composer and arranger	Other tracks by Shigeki Hayashi, Kenichi Sakoh, Yusuke Shirato, and Motoi Sakuraba
2019	Blue Oath	Composer	Other tracks by Yoshiaki Fujisawa, Shigenobu Okawa, Fukuhiro Shuichiro, Akiyuki Tateyama, Mamoru Mori, Makino Tadayoshi, Miao Jinchuan, Shiki, and G-angle
