= Hayato Isomura =

Japanese actor (born 1992)

- 磯村 勇斗
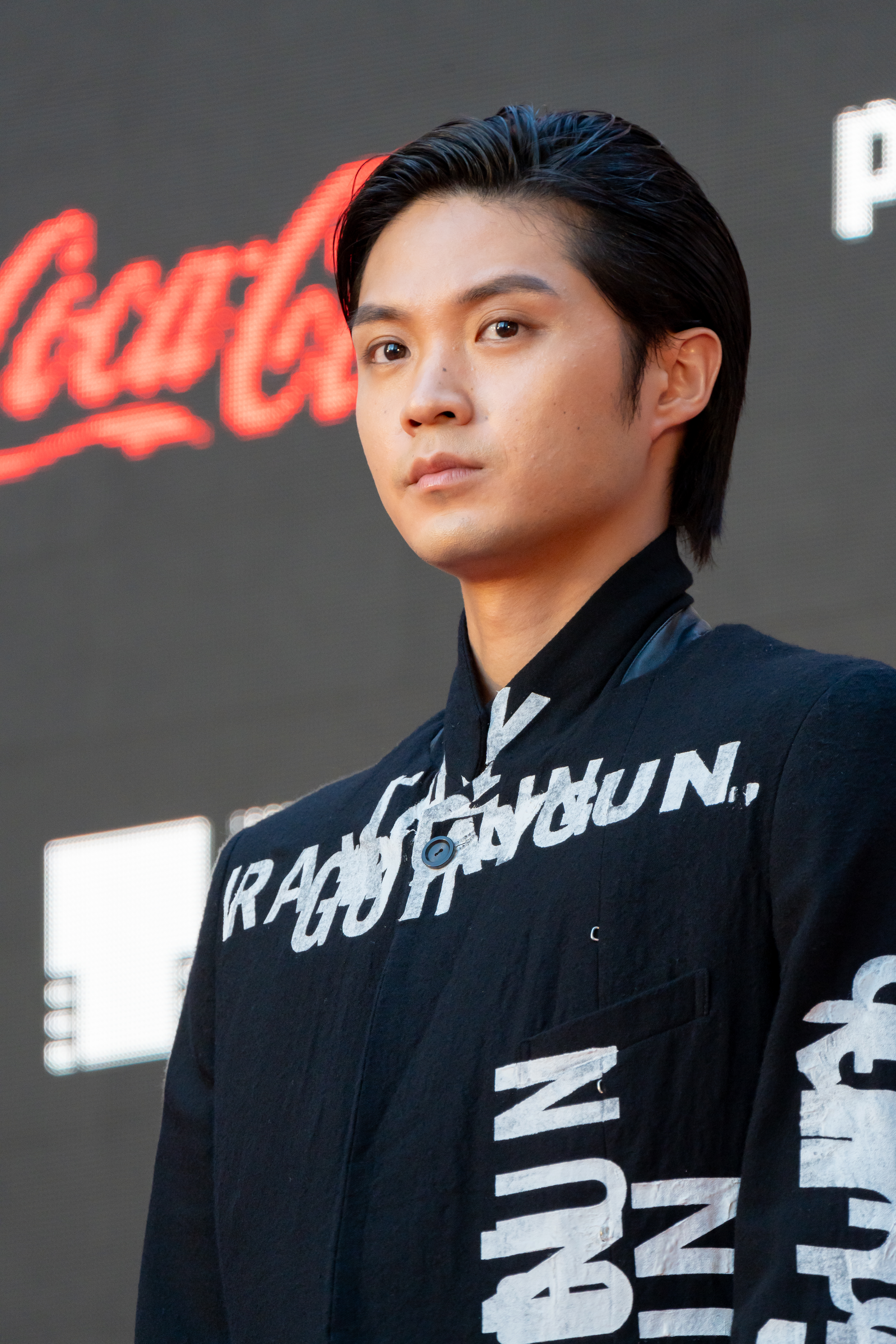
- Isomura at the Tokyo International Film Festival in 2023
- Born: September 11, 1992 (age 33); Numazu, Shizuoka Prefecture, Japan
- Occupation: Actor
- Years active: 2014–present
- Agent: Blue Label
- Website: hayato-isomura.com

Hayato Isomura (磯村 勇斗, Isomura Hayato; born September 11, 1992) is a Japanese actor who is represented by the talent agency Blue Label.

== Filmography ==
=== Films ===
Year	Title	Role	Notes	Ref.
2015	Girls Step	Tamotsu Ikebe		
2015	Kamen Rider × Kamen Rider Ghost & Drive: Super Movie War Genesis	Alain		
2016	Kamen Rider Ghost the Movie: The 100 Eyecons and Ghost's Fated Moment	Alain/Kamen Rider Necrom		
2017	Anonymous Noise	Ayumu Kurose		
2018	You, I Love	Keita Fuji		
2018	After the Rain	Ryosuke Kase		
2018	Waiting for Spring	Kyosuke Wakamiya		
2020	From Today, It's My Turn!! the Movie	Takeshi Sagara		
2020	The Untold Tale of the Three Kingdoms	Xun Yu		
2021	Tokyo Revengers	Atsushi Sendō		
2021	What Did You Eat Yesterday?	Wataru "Gilbert" Inoue		
2021	A Family	Tsubasa Kimura		
2021	What She Likes...	Mr. Fahrenheit		
2022	Plan 75	Hiromu Okabe		
2022	Prior Convictions	Shinji Takimoto		
2022	xxxHolic	Akagumo		
2022	Believers	Operator	Lead role	
2022	The Fish Tale	The leader of bad boys		
2022	Offbeat Cops	Shōta Sakamoto		
2022	A Turtle's Shell Is a Human's Ribs	Erutaka Kaerugawa (voice)		
2023	Tokyo Revengers 2: Bloody Halloween Part 1	Atsushi Sendō		
2023	Tokyo Revengers 2: Bloody Halloween Part 2	Atsushi Sendō		
2023	Ripples	Takuya Sudō		
2023	Hard Days	Oda		
2023	The Dry Spell	Takuji Kida		
2023	(Ab)normal Desire	Yoshimichi Sasaki		
2023	The Moon	Sato-kun		
2024	The Young Strangers	Ayato Kazama	Lead role	
2024	Hakkenden: Fiction and Reality	Takizawa Sōhaku		
2025	The Solitary Gourmet	Nakagawa		
2026	Coffee After All		Special appearance	
2026	Mentor	Ryunosuke	Lead role	

=== Television ===
Year	Title	Role	Notes	Ref.
2014	Fisherman's Blues	Satoru Isogai	Episode 3	
2015	Mare	Hirai	Episode 62; Asadora	
2015	Scapegoat	Kei Misaki		
2015–16	Kamen Rider Ghost	Alain/Kamen Rider Necrom		
2017	Hiyokko	Hidetoshi Maeda	Asadora	
2018	Suits	Yusei Tanimoto		
2018	From Today, It's My Turn!!	Takeshi Sagara		
2019	Hiyokko 2	Hidetoshi Maeda	Miniseries	
2019–23	What Did You Eat Yesterday?	Wataru "Gilbert" Inoue	2 seasons	
2020	Daddy is My Classmate		Episode 1; cameo	
2020	Suits Season 2	Yusei Tanimoto	Episode 8	
2020	Mothers in Love	Go Akasaka		
2021	Reach Beyond the Blue Sky	Tokugawa Iemochi	Taiga drama	
2021	How About Some Coffee?	Sugi "Pei" Sanpei		
2022–25	Alice in Borderland	Sunato Banda	Seasons 2–3	
2024	Extremely Inappropriate!	Mutsumi Akitsu / Masahiko Akitsu		
2025	Who Saw the Peacock Dance in the Jungle?	Takashi Kamii		
2025	School Lawyer: Finding the Colors of the Stars	Kenji Shiratori	Lead role	
2026	Extremely Inappropriate! Special	Mutsumi Akitsu / Masahiko Akitsu	Television film	
2026	Soul Mate	Ryu Narutaki	Lead role	
2026	Did Someone Happen to Mention Me?	Takeru Murai		

=== Japanese dub ===
Year	Title	Role	Notes	Ref.
2024	Blind Willow, Sleeping Woman	Komura		

== Awards and nominations ==
Year	Award	Category	Work(s)	Result	Ref.
2021	46th Hochi Film Awards	Best Supporting Actor	A Family and others	Nominated	
2022	64th Blue Ribbon Awards	Best Supporting Actor	A Family and others	Nominated	
2022	45th Japan Academy Film Prize	Newcomer of the Year	A Family and What Did You Eat Yesterday?	Won	
2022	35th Nikkan Sports Film Awards	Best Supporting Actor	Plan 75, The Fish Tale and others	Nominated	
2022	47th Hochi Film Awards	Best Supporting Actor	Plan 75, The Fish Tale and others	Nominated	
2023	44th Yokohama Film Festival	Best Supporting Actor	Plan 75, The Fish Tale and others	Won	
2023	65th Blue Ribbon Awards	Best Supporting Actor	Plan 75, The Fish Tale and others	Nominated	
2023	36th Nikkan Sports Film Awards	Best Supporting Actor	The Moon and others	Won	
2023	Elle Cinema Awards 2023	Elle Men Award	The Moon and (Ab)normal Desire	Won	
2023	48th Hochi Film Awards	Best Supporting Actor	The Moon	Won	
2024	78th Mainichi Film Awards	Best Supporting Actor	The Moon	Nominated	
2024	45th Yokohama Film Festival	Best Supporting Actor	The Moon, (Ab)normal Desire and others	Won	
2024	66th Blue Ribbon Awards	Best Supporting Actor	The Moon, Ripples and others	Nominated	
2024	97th Kinema Junpo Awards	Best Supporting Actor	The Moon, Ripples and others	Won	
2024	48th Elan d'or Awards	Newcomer of the Year	Himself	Won	
2024	47th Japan Academy Film Prize	Best Supporting Actor	The Moon	Won	
