= Hikaru Ohsawa =

Japanese actress (born 1995)

- 大沢 ひかる
- Born: March 9, 1995 (age 30); Tokyo, Japan
- Occupation: Actress
- Years active: 2010–2019
- Agent: Stardust Promotion（Ended in 2019）
- Height: 167 cm (5 ft 6 in)

Hikaru Ohsawa (大沢 ひかる, Ōsawa Hikaru; born March 9, 1995, in Tokyo, Japan) is a former Japanese actress who was represented by the talent agency Stardust Promotion.

== Biography ==
In 2010, Ohsawa is affiliated with her current office, Stardust Promotion.

Her first starring role is the stage play, Pool Side Story, and later appeared in theater plays, films, and television dramas. In stage, Ohsawa has starring roles in plays such as Jū oni no Kizuna: Sekigahara Kitan Koi Mai.

From January 11, 2014, she served as a reporter of King's Brunch.

== Filmography ==
=== TV series ===
Year	Title	Role	Network	Notes	References
2012	Teen Court: 10-dai Saiban	Ezaki	NTV	Episode 7	
2012	Hōkago wa Mystery to Tomoni	Yuko Ijima	TBS		
2012	Boku-ra ga Ren'ai Dekinai Riyū	Suzuki-san	TV Tokyo		
2013	Neo Ultra Q	Izumi Makino	WOWOW	Episode 10	
2014	Jiken Kyūmei-i 2: IMAT no Kiseki	Rui Yamaguchi	TV Asahi		
2015	Utsukushiki Wana: Zanka Ryōran	Misaki	TBS		
2015	Death Note	Chisato Shomizu	NTV		
2015	Kamen Rider Ghost	Akari Tsukimura	TV Asahi		

=== Films ===
Year	Title	Role	Notes
2011	Anime Fan Tom	Mika	Lead role
2013	Jinrō Game	Hitomi Inaba	
2014	Tokyo Slaves	Julia Katsushika	
2015	Wasurenai to Chikatta Boku ga Ita	Kanae Fujimura	
2015	Attack on Titan	Ibuki	
2015	Kamen Rider × Kamen Rider Ghost & Drive: Super Movie War Genesis	Akari Tsukimura	
2016	Kamen Rider 1	Akari Tsukimura	
2016	Kamen Rider Ghost: The 100 Eyecons and Ghost's Fated Moment	Akari Tsukimura	
2018	Rin		

== Stage play ==
Year	Title	Role	Notes
2014–2016	Danganronpa The Stage	Toko Fukawa / Genocide Jill/Jack	
