= Akihiro Mayama =

Japanese actor

- 真山 明大
- Born: 31 January 1988 (age 37); Miyagi Prefecture, Japan
- Occupation: Actor
- Years active: 2006–2020
- Height: 174 cm (5 ft 9 in)

Akihiro Mayama (真山 明大, Mayama Akihiro; born 31 January 1988, in Miyagi Prefecture, Japan) is a Japanese actor. He is currently a freelancer.

== Biography ==
Mayama graduated from Natori City Midori Junior High School and Miyagi Prefecture Sendai Mukayama High School. In 2004, he won the special prize at the 17th Junon Super Boy Contest. In 2006, Mayama debuted with the drama Regatta: Kimi toita Eien. In 2016, he was cast as Adel, the main villain of the tokusatsu series, Kamen Rider Ghost. On September 1, 2020, he announced his retirement from the entertainment industry. He currently works in real estate.

== Filmography ==
=== TV dramas ===
Year	Title	Role	Network
2006	Regatta: Kimi toita Eien	Mayama	TV Asahi
2007	Himitsu no Hanazono	Ata Kataoka (young)	Fuji TV
2007	Mayonaka no March	Akira	WOWOW
2007	Biyō Shōnen Celebrity	Kei	TV Tokyo
2008	Gokusen: Dai 3 Series	Akira Hara	NTV
2008	Cafe Kichijoji de	Hide Tokumi	TV Tokyo
2009	Mei-chan no Shitsuji	Butler Aoyama	Fuji TV
2010	Indigo no Yoru	Daisuke	THK, Fuji TV
2010	Shukujo		NHK-E
2011	Sakura Shinjū	Ken Kenyama	THK, Fuji TV
2012	Suzuko no Koi	Eiichi Sato	THK, Fuji TV
2013	Shomuni 2013	Sōshoku-kei kanji	Fuji TV
2013	Yamada-kun and the Seven Witches		Fuji TV
2013	Legal High		Fuji TV
2014	Nazo no Tenkōsei	Tsutomu Sonoda	TV Tokyo
2014	Hottokenai Majo-tachi	Mitsuru Shiraishi	Fuji TV, THK
2015	Keishichō Sōsaikka 9 Kakari season 10	Shun Endo	TV Asahi
2015	Tsuribaka Nisshi	Takashi	TV Tokyo
2016	Kamen Rider Ghost	Adel, Ganmiser (voice)	TV Asahi
2016	Okashina Keiji	Yuya Saya	TV Asahi

=== Films ===
Year	Title
2006	Presents: Aikagi
2007	Kōfuku na Shokutaku
2008	Carved 2: The Scissors Massacre
2010	Tsuki to Uso to Satsujin
2012	Watashi no Dorei ni nari nasai
2013	Usotsuki Paradox
2014	Shishunki-gokko
2015	Oedo no Candy

=== Stage ===
Year	Title	Role
2007	switch	Kai Eto
2009	Fruits Basket	Yuki Soma, Juni Odoru
2010	Indigo no Yoru	Daisuke Tsuki
2010	Kokansetsu!	Yuta Hirose
2011	Otakers High!	
2011	Life pathfinder 2011 Tour to the end	
2012	The Radio Show Must Go On –Bareluna Kiken–	
2012	Yō wa mata nobori soshite kurikaesu	
2012	Koisuru Anti Hero	
2012	Anata ga Nemurinitsuku Mae ni	
2012	Ice Cream Man	
2013	Kokka –Giden, Kanmu to Saichō to sono Jidai–	
2013	Poseidon no Mago to Y-Shirts to Watashi	
2013	The Fake Time Machine Story –Uso e no Tobira–	
2013	New Cinema Paradi chu	
2014	Meido In Heaven	
2015	Shinsengumi of the Dead	

=== Advertisements ===
Year	Title
2013	House Wellness Foods C1000

=== DVD ===
Year	Title
2009	Holiday
2010	Teenage -Eiga 'Tsuki to Uso to Satsujin' Spin Off-
