= Megumi Kobashi =

Japanese actress (born 1979)

- 小橋 めぐみ
- Born: 3 July 1979 (age 45); Tokyo, Japan
- Occupation: Actress
- Years active: 1994–
- Agent: FMG
- Notable work: University of Laughs; Marriage Ring; Reunion
- Television: Tokugawa Yoshinobu; Shin Tenmadetodoke series; Kariya Keibu Series; Silent Poor
- Website: Official website

Megumi Kobashi (小橋 めぐみ, Kobashi Megumi, born 3 July 1979) is a Japanese actress who has appeared in a number of television series, feature films and stage productions. She is represented by the agency FMG. She was born in Tokyo.

== Biography, personal life ==
She debuted in 1994 in the television series Hanjuku Tamago. She attracted attention in the series Tokugawa Yoshinobu (as Chikako, Princess Kazu) and the Shin Tenmadetodoke series (as daughter Aki Sugimoto).

Known as a book enthusiast, she writes about many books in her official blog. (Note: Megumi Kobashi official blog "Comment allez-vous?") She also wrote the serial essay "Dokusho Netsu" in the e-book literary magazine Shōsetsu-ya sari-sari of e-book store "Book Walker" (Issues September 2012 to June 2015). It was later made into the book, Koi Doku: Hon ni Koi shita 2-nen 9kagetsu released on 26 September 2015.

== Filmography ==
=== TV dramas ===
| Dates | Title | Role | Network | Series | Notes |
|---|---|---|---|---|---|
| Oct–Dec 1994 | Hanjuku Tamago | | Fuji TV | | |
| Apr–Sep 1995 | Heart ni S | | Fuji TV | | Episode 10 "Hachiko's tail" |
| Jul–Sep 1995 | Kindaichi Shōnen no Jikenbo | Risa Yoshimura | NTV | | Episode 5 "Hanging School Murder Case" |
| 8 Feb 1996 | Mokuyō no Kaidan: Kaiki Club Shōgakusei-hen | Mizuki | Fuji TV | | Episode 11 "Bloody Valentine" |
| Oct–Nov 1996 | Ie e oideyo | | NHK | | |
| 7 Jun 1997 | Itoshi no Mirai-chan | Kyoko | EX | | Episode 9 "New Cinema Paradise" |
| Jul–Sep 1997 | Glass Mask | | EX | | Episodes 8 and 9 |
| 15 Sep 1997 | Kigeki Tokyo Monogatari | | TBS | | |
| Jan–Dec 1998 | Tokugawa Yoshinobu | Chikako, Princess Kazu | NHK | Taiga drama | |
| Apr–Jul 1998 | Shomuni | Hiroko Tachibana | Fuji TV | | Episode 9 |
| Oct–Dec 1998 | Hashire Kōmuin! | | Fuji TV | | Episode 2 |
| 2 Jan 1999 | Akō Rōshi | Oshino | TX | | |
| 1999–2004 | Shin Tenmadetodoke | Aki Kawai | TBS | Ai no Gekijō | |
| 17 Feb 2000 | Hatchōbori no Shichi-nin | Osayo | EX | | Series 1 Episode 6 "A Woman with Multiple Personality - I Have Not Killed!!" |
| 20 Apr 2000 | Abarenbō Shōgun X | Okyo Yamaneko | EX | | Episode 4 "A Woman Caught in a Conspiracy" |
| 1, 8 Mar 2002 | Trick 2 | Emi Tsukamoto | EX | | Episode 8 and 9 |
| 23 Feb 2003 | Kētai Deka: Zenigata Ai | | BS-TBS | | Episode 21 “Berlin Wall Murder Case” |
| 5 Feb 2003 | Hamidashi Keiji Jōnetsukei VII | | EX | | Episode 5 |
| Feb 2003 | Kaidan Shin Mimibukuro | | BS-TBS | | 1st Series Episode 30 "The Backward Suit" |
| Apr–Sep 2003 | Koisuru Nichiyōbi | | BS-TBS | | First Series Episode 6 |
| Apr–Jun 2003 | Kao | | Fuji TV | | Episode 10 |
| Sep–Dec 2003 | Yumemiru Budō: Hon o Yomu Onna | Yaeko Sakata | NHK | | |
| 16 Apr 2004 | Kyoto-Gion Iri-Muko Keiji Jiken-bo | Mayumi Namura | Fuji TV | Friday Entertainment | Episode 11 |
| Jan–Mar 2005 | Girl Meets Girl | | BS Fuji | | |
| Dec 2006 – Mar 2007 | Kekkonshiki e Ikō | Natsuko | TBS | | Episode 6 |
| 6 Feb 2008 | Aibō | Eiko Fujii | | | Season 6 Episode 14 "Amber-colored Murder" |
| 22 Feb 2008 | Kinyō Prestige Doctor Koishi no Jiken Karute 4: Gekiyaku | | Fuji TV | | |
| Jul–Sep 2008 | Here Is Greenwood | Noriko Rokujou | | | |
| Jun–Aug 2009 | Natsu no Himitsu | Fuki Shibayama | THK | | |
| 30 Jun 2010 | Shin Keishichō Sōsaikka 9 Kakari | Mayumi Takahashi | EX | | Season 2 Episode 1 "10 Billion Murders" |
| Apr–Jun 2011 | Good Life: Arigatō, Papa. Sayonara | Yoko Mizushima | KTV | | Episodes 1 and 3 |
| 4 Jun 2011 | Okashina Keiji 7: Sakurasō wa Mite ita! | Shizuka Takamori | EX | | |
| 19 Mar 2012 | Kyoto Buyō Shūmei Murder Case | Rui Sugata | TBS | Kariya Keibu Series | Episode 11 |
| 19 Nov 2012 | Kyoto Kōdō Murder Case | Rui Sugata | TBS | Kariya Keibu Series | Episode 12 |
| 3 Mar 2014 | Kyoto Ningyō Jōruri Murder Case | Rui Sugata | TBS | Kariya Keibu Series | Episode 13 |
| 22 Dec 2014 | Kyoto Bellydance Murder Case | Rui Sugata | TBS | Kariya Keibu Series | Episode 14 |
| 7 Dec 2015 | Kyoto Tapestry Murder Case | Rui Sugata | TBS | Kariya Keibu Series | Episode 15 |
| 26 Apr 2012 | Shin Omiyasan | Yumi Ichimura | EX | | |
| 1 Sep 2012 | Bayside Shakedown | Kumiko Nozoe | Fuji TV | | The Last TV "A police man of salary work and the last difficult case" |
| 1 Dec 2012 | Hōigaku Kyōshitsu no Jiken File 35: Nagasaki - Yokohama, Kame ga Mite ita Satsujin Jiken!? | Satomi Ikushima | EX | | |
| 5 Oct 2013 | Kariya Chichi Musume Series 15: Kyoto Gourmet Tour Satsujin Jiken! | Kayo Yasuda | TV Asahi | | |
| 25 Oct 2013 | Keiji Seiichi Yoshinaga: Namida no Jiken-bo | Rikako Nogami | TX | | Episode 3 |
| 15 Mar 2014 | NHK Special Shūsen Tokushū Drama Tokyo ga Senjō ni natta Hi | | NHK | | |
| Apr–Jun 2014 | Drama 10 Silent Poor | Rumi Hara | NHK | | |
| 30 Aug 2014 | Osoroshi: Mishima-ya Henchō Hyakumonogatari | Okon | NHK BS Premium | | The first night "Manjushage(a spider lily)" |
| 22 Nov – 27 Dec 2014 | Doyō Drama Dark Suits | | NHK G | | |
| 15 Jan 2015 | Dekin no Onna: Jiken Kisha Kurogane | Kaori Nakayama | EX | | Episode 1 |
| 22 Oct 2015 | Kasōken no Onna: Dai 15 Series | Shiho Sato | EX | | Episode 2 |
| 6 Apr 2016 | Keishichō Sōsaikka 9 Kakari | Akiko Adachi | EX | | |
| 28 May 2016 | Garo: Makai Retsuden | Kyoko | TX | | Episode 8 |
| 31 Jul, 7 Aug 2016 | Kamen Rider Ghost | Mitsuko Endo | EX | | Episodes 43 and 44 |
| 16 Aug 2016 | On: Abnormal Criminal Investigator, Hanako Todo | A daughter of Kiyoshi Urasawa | Fuji-TV | | Episode 6 |
| 1 Oct - 10 Dec 2018 | Keishichou Sousa Shiryou Kanrishitsu (Kari) | Kumiko Nozoe | BS Fuji | Keishichou Sousa Shiryou Kanrishitsu | |
| 1 Apr - 10 Jun 2019 | Keishichou Sousa Shiryou Kanrishitsu | Kumiko Nozoe | BS Fuji | Keishichou Sousa Shiryou Kanrishitsu | Season 2 |
| 3 Mar 2020 | Keishichou Sousa Shiryou Kanrishitsu Back to the falling down death accident case in Music class | Sachiko Nozoe | BS Fuji | Keishichou Sousa Shiryou Kanrishitsu | |
| 14 -15 Mar 2020 | Keishichou Sousa Shiryou Kanrishitsu - BS Fuji 20th Anniversary Special the first Program | Kumiko Nozoe | BS Fuji | Keishichou Sousa Shiryou Kanrishitsu | |

=== TV anime ===
| Date | Title | Role | Network | Notes |
|---|---|---|---|---|
| 7 Dec 2014 | Mushishi: Zoku Shou | Shino | Tokyo MX, BS11 | "Episode 18 Thunder" |

=== Travel or Trip programmes ===
| Date | Title | Network | Notes |
|---|---|---|---|
| 30 May 1999 | Sekai Ulrun Taizai-ki | TBS | "Chinese Oolong Tea" |
| Jun 2008 | Watakushi-teki China-Navi(China Navigation of my point) | TBS | Mount Lu;Jingdezhen |
| 24 Aug 2015 | Kiki Komi! Local-sen: Kimagure Gesha no Tabi | BS Japan | Nagano Alpico Kōtsū <Matsumoto Dentetsu> Kamikōchisen no Tabi |
| 19 Oct 2015 | Shuppatsu! Kimamani Shumi Tabi | BS Japan | Aki no Sendai Matsushima Matsuo Bashō Oku no Hosomichi o Meguru Haiku Tabi |
| 20 Jun 2016 | Shuppatsu! Local-sen: Kiki komi Hakken Tabi | BS Japan | Akita Yuri Kōgentetsudō Chōkai Sanrokusen no Tabi |
| 23 Apr 2022 | Neko Tabi Haiku | BS Shochiku Tokyu | Cats Trip Haiku |

=== Book review programmes ===
| Date | Title | Network |
|---|---|---|
| 24 Jul 2010 | Shūkan Book Review | NHK-BS2 |
| 29 Oct 2011 | Shūkan Book Review | NHK-BS Premium |
| 31 Dec 2012 | Hon no Kamisama | NHK-BS Premium |

=== Films ===
| Year | Title | Role | Director | Notes |
|---|---|---|---|---|
| 2004 | University of Laughs | | Mamoru Hoshi | |
| 2006 | Fugaku Hyakkei: Harukanaru Basho | | Masatoshi Akihara | |
| 2006 | Gingatetsudō no Yoru: I carry a ticket of eternity | | Masatoshi Akihara | |
| 2007 | Marriage Ring | Chinami Moriya | Kei Shichiri | Lead role |
| 2012 | Bayside Shakedown The Final | Kumiko Nozoe | Katsuyuki Motohiro | |
| 2013 | Reunion | | Ryoichi Kimizuka | |
| 2013 | Nestle Theater on YouTube Regret | | Katsuyuki Motohiro | |
| 2014 | Maria no Chibusa | | Takahisa Zeze | |
| 2016 | 64 | Toshiko Amemiya | | |
| 2016 | Anniversary | | Katsuyuki Motohiro | |
| 2016 | Gekijō-ban hontō ni atta kowai Hanashi 2016: Dai 5 Kowa Atarashī Hito | | Yasunari Konno | |
| 2016 | Nestle Theater on YouTube Odoru Dai Kūkō #12 | Sorane Shinohara | | |
| 2017 | Koinowa: Konkatsu Cruising | Ayaka Kido | Shûsuke Kaneko | |

=== Stage ===
| Dates | Title | Role | Production | Location | Notes |
|---|---|---|---|---|---|
| Jan–Feb 1999 | Kantaro Terauchi Ikka | Shizue Terauchi | | Shinbashi Enbujō | |
| 11-27 Jun 1999 | Gesshouto Kitan | Sayoko | R.U.P | Ginza Saison Theater | |
| Dec 1999 | Tsuki Umaya oen - Tatta 10ka no Hanayome | | | Meiji-za | |
| Aug–Sep 1999 | Shin Peter Pan | Wendy | | New National Theatre, Tokyo | |
| Jul–Aug 2003 | Stand by Me | Holly | | Tokyo Metropolitan Theatre | |
| 26 Jul – 6 Aug 2006 | Nangoku Pool no Atsui Suna | | Kodomo no Shiro + Nelke Planning | Aoyama Round Theatre | |
| Feb 2007 | Asu ni kakeruhashi | | | Shinjuku Theater Tops | |
| 23 Jun – 1 Jul 2007 | Kamisama no Yoru (Program B "Hitori janai") | | Kakuta to Hiromi Kawakami + Friends | Ebisu Gallery Site | |
| 28 Jan–1 Feb 2009 | Ave Maritarre! | Mirai Asuno | Twin-Beat | Space Zero | |
| 20–29 May 2011 | Sonata | | | Shimokitazawa Theater | |
| 13–17 Jul 2011 | Bijin Zei | | FMG Work Studio 7th Performance | Shimokitazawa Geki Underground Liberty | |
| 8–12 Sep 2011 | Dobu, Giwagiwa no Onna-tachi | Shingetsu Amaya | | AiiA Theater Tokyo | Lead role |
| 5–10 Jun 2013 | Aruteno no Pan | Yoko | Jetlag | Akasak Red Theater | |

=== Advertisements ===
| Year | Product |
|---|---|
| 1993 | Hamaradi (now: Fm Yokohama 84.7) |
| 2007 | Suntory "Furaban Cha" |
| 2010 | Hakone Tensen Garden |

=== Video media ===
| Dates | Title | Website | Ref. |
|---|---|---|---|
| Oct 2014 – | Kitaaoyama Channel Megumi Kobashi no Hon no Megumi | YouTube | |

== Bibliography ==
=== Essays ===
| Date | Title | Publisher | ISBN |
|---|---|---|---|
| Sep 2015 | Koi Doku: Hon ni Koi shita 2-nen 9-kagetsu | Kadokawa Corporation | ISBN 978-4-04-103264-0 |

=== Photo albums ===
| Date | Title | Photographer | Publisher | ISBN |
|---|---|---|---|---|
| May 1996 | 16-Sai no Love Letter | Koji Inomoto | | ISBN 4915939154 |
| Oct 2002 | Fuka | Masashi Hashimoto | Wani Books | ISBN 4847027310 |
