= Kamen Rider Ghost =

Japanese Drama

- Genre: Tokusatsu; Superhero fiction Fantasy action Supernatural fiction Comedy horror
- Created by: Shotaro Ishinomori
- Written by: Takuro Fukuda; Nobuhiro Mouri; Keiichi Hasegawa
- Directed by: Satoshi Morota; Kyohei Yamaguchi; Takayuki Shibasaki; Nobuhiro Suzumura; Katsuya Watanabe; Koichi Sakamoto; Ryuta Tasaki
- Starring: Shun Nishime; Hikaru Ohsawa; Ryosuke Yamamoto; Takayuki Yanagi; Hayato Isomura; Yoshiyuki Morishita; Sotaro; Akihiro Mayama; Hiroshi Yamamoto; Reon Kadena; Seiji Takaiwa; Takuya Mizoguchi; Reo Kansyuji; Mio Kudo; Naoto Takenaka
- Voices of: Aoi Yūki; Tomokazu Seki; Sayaka Ohara
- Narrated by: Kazuya Ichijō; Shun Nishime; Aoi Yūki (Next Episode Preview)
- Opening theme: "Warera Omou, Yue ni Warera Ari" by Kishidan
- Composer: Go Sakabe
- Country of origin: Japan
- Original language: Japanese
- No. of episodes: 50 (list of episodes)

Production
- Producers: Motoi Sasaki (TV Asahi); Ayumi Kanno (TV Asahi); Kazuhiro Takahashi (Toei)
- Running time: 20–25 minutes
- Production companies: Toei Company; Ishimori Productions; TV Asahi Corporation; Asatsu-DK

Original release
- Network: ANN (TV Asahi)
- Release: October 4, 2015 – September 25, 2016

Related
- Kamen Rider Drive; Kamen Rider Ex-Aid

Kamen Rider Ghost (仮面ライダーゴースト, Kamen Raidā Gōsuto) is a Japanese tokusatsu drama serving as the 17th Heisei Kamen Rider Series, and 26th series overall. Takuro Fukuda serves as Ghost's lead screenwriter, with Satoshi Morota as director. It premiered on TV Asahi and affiliate stations throughout Japan on October 4, 2015, one week following its predecessor series Kamen Rider Drive's finale. It joined Shuriken Sentai Ninninger, and later, Doubutsu Sentai Zyuohger in the Super Hero Time programming block.

The motif of the series is centered around ghosts, historical figures, and eye-based themes. The series focuses on the protagonist, Takeru Tenkuji, who becomes Kamen Rider Ghost after dying and being temporarily resurrected. He is tasked with collecting Eyecons, which contain the spirits of famous historical figures such as Thomas Edison, Isaac Newton, Musashi Miyamoto, Ludwig van Beethoven, and more.

== Story ==
Takeru Tenkūji, whose father was a ghost hunter who died 10 years earlier, dies at the hands of an evil monster known as a Ganma (眼魔, Ganma; Eye Demon) while trying to protect his childhood friend Akari Tsukimura from an attack. A mysterious hermit brings Takeru back to life and bestows upon him the Ghost Driver transformation belt and a Ghost Eyecon (ゴースト眼魂, Gōsuto Aikon; Ghost Eye Soul), an orb-shaped device which can see ghostly creatures like spirits of dead creatures, Ganma, and other Riders. The hermit tells Takeru that he has 99 days to gather 15 additional heroic Eyecons to be brought back to life permanently, and must fight the Ganma as Kamen Rider Ghost to obtain them. He is assisted by the Buddhist monk Onari, who previously supported his father as a ghost hunter, and Akari, who tries to find more scientific and logical reasons behind their supernatural encounters. In his way are Makoto Fukami, a mysterious living young man capable of utilizing a Ghost Driver to transform into Kamen Rider Specter (仮面ライダースペクター, Kamen Raidā Supekutā), and the Ganma led by Chikara Saionji, an associate of Takeru's late father, and Alain, the son of the Ganma leader, who later acquires the means to transform into the anti-hero Kamen Rider Necrom (仮面ライダーネクロム, Kamen Raidā Nekuromu).

The Riders of Kamen Rider Ghost use Eyecons to transform and summon the hooded jacket-like spirits called Hoodie Ghosts (パーカーゴースト, Pākā Gōsuto) like the spirits of historical figures such as Miyamoto Musashi, Thomas Edison, Tutankhamun and Isaac Newton to grant them new powers.

== Casting and production ==
The Kamen Rider Ghost trademark was registered by Toei on April 28, 2015.

Shun Nishime is the lead actor of Kamen Rider Ghost, portraying the hero Takeru Tenkūji. At only 17 years old, he is one of the youngest actors to portray the leading role in a Kamen Rider Series, coming after Masaki Suda from Kamen Rider W who was 16 at the time of filming and tying with Takeru Satoh from Kamen Rider Den-O. The rest of the cast includes female lead Hikaru Ohsawa, the rival Kamen Rider Ryosuke Yamamoto, Takayuki Yanagi, Yoshiyuki Morishita, Hayato Isomura, and Naoto Takenaka.

Japanese rock band Kishidan performs the television series' opening theme song. When Kishidan's involvement was announced, lead singer Show Ayanocozey joked that he was very worried about writing the song, but consulted with Takashi Niigaki on how to write songs about ghosts.

== Episodes ==
Much like some of Gaim's earlier episodes, the episode titles for this series are all in the form of an exclamatory sentences, with the first one being exactly two kanji long much like Kuuga's episodes.

No.	Title	Directed by	Written by	Original release date
1	"Eyes Open! It's Me!"; Transliteration: "Kaigan! Ore!" (Japanese: 開眼！俺！)	Satoshi Morota	Takuro Fukuda	October 4, 2015
2	"Shocking! The Invention King!"; Transliteration: "Dengeki! Hatsumeiō!" (Japanese: 電撃！発明王！)	Satoshi Morota	Takuro Fukuda	October 11, 2015
3	"Bull's-eye! Archery of Justice!"; Transliteration: "Hitchū! Seigi no Yumiya!" (Japanese: 必中！正義の弓矢！)	Kyohei Yamaguchi	Takuro Fukuda	October 18, 2015
4	"Amazing! The Castle in the Sky!"; Transliteration: "Kyōgaku! Sora no Shiro!" (Japanese: 驚愕！空の城！)	Kyohei Yamaguchi	Takuro Fukuda	October 25, 2015
5	"Shocking! The Mysterious Kamen Rider!"; Transliteration: "Shōgeki! Nazo no Kamen Raidā!" (Japanese: 衝撃！謎の仮面ライダー！)	Satoshi Morota	Takuro Fukuda	November 8, 2015
6	"Fate! The Comeback Melody!"; Transliteration: "Unmei! Saiki no Merodi!" (Japanese: 運命！再起のメロディ！)	Satoshi Morota	Nobuhiro Mouri	November 15, 2015
7	"Quick Draw! The Legendary Gunman!"; Transliteration: "Hayauchi! Densetsu no Ganman!" (Japanese: 早撃！伝説のガンマン！)	Takayuki Shibasaki	Takuro Fukuda	November 22, 2015
8	"Activation! Another Monolith!"; Transliteration: "Hatsudō! Mō Hitotsu no Monorisu!" (Japanese: 発動！もう一つのモノリス！)	Takayuki Shibasaki	Takuro Fukuda	November 29, 2015
9	"Imposing! The Loyal Man!"; Transliteration: "Dōdō! Chūgi no Otoko!" (Japanese: 堂堂！忠義の男！)	Kyohei Yamaguchi	Nobuhiro Mouri	December 6, 2015
10	"Gathered! Fifteen Eyecons!"; Transliteration: "Shūketsu! Jūgo no Aikon!" (Japanese: 集結！15の眼魂！)	Kyohei Yamaguchi	Nobuhiro Mouri	December 13, 2015
11	"Magnificent! Mysterious Eyes!"; Transliteration: "Shōgon! Shinpi no Me!" (Japanese: 荘厳！神秘の目！)	Satoshi Morota	Takuro Fukuda	December 20, 2015
12	"Heroic! A Man's Resolve!"; Transliteration: "Sōzetsu! Otoko no Kakugo!" (Japanese: 壮絶！男の覚悟！)	Satoshi Morota	Takuro Fukuda	December 27, 2015
13	"Exciting! A Free Man!"; Transliteration: "Gōkai! Jiyū na Otoko!" (Japanese: 豪快！自由な男！)	Nobuhiro Suzumura	Nobuhiro Mouri	January 10, 2016
14	"Superb View! The Dawn of the Earth!"; Transliteration: "Zekkei! Chikyū no Yoake!" (Japanese: 絶景！地球の夜明け！)	Nobuhiro Suzumura	Nobuhiro Mouri	January 17, 2016
15	"Agony! The Stubborn Escape King!"; Transliteration: "Kunō! Ganko na Dasshutsu-ō!" (Japanese: 苦悩！頑固な脱出王！)	Kyohei Yamaguchi	Takuro Fukuda	January 24, 2016
16	"Perfect! The White Kamen Rider!"; Transliteration: "Kanpeki! Shiroi Kamen Raidā!" (Japanese: 完璧！白い仮面ライダー！)	Kyohei Yamaguchi	Takuro Fukuda	January 31, 2016
17	"Gorgeous! The Phantom Queen!"; Transliteration: "Kenran! Maboroshi no Joō!" (Japanese: 絢爛！幻の女王！)	Satoshi Morota	Keiichi Hasegawa	February 7, 2016
18	"Turn-Around! Mysterious Science!"; Transliteration: "Gyakuten! Shinpi na Kagaku!" (Japanese: 逆転！神秘な科学！)	Satoshi Morota	Keiichi Hasegawa	February 14, 2016
19	"Explosion! Paint From Your Heart!"; Transliteration: "Bakuhatsu! E o Kaku Kokoro!" (Japanese: 爆発！絵を描く心！)	Katsuya Watanabe	Takuro Fukuda	February 21, 2016
20	"Eruption! The Flames of Friendship!"; Transliteration: "Sakuretsu! Honō no Yūjō!" (Japanese: 炸裂！炎の友情！)	Katsuya Watanabe	Takuro Fukuda	February 28, 2016
21	"Amazing! The Gamma's World!"; Transliteration: "Kyōi! Ganma no Sekai!" (Japanese: 驚異！眼魔の世界！)	Kyohei Yamaguchi	Keiichi Hasegawa	March 6, 2016
22	"Conspiracy! Adel's Trap!"; Transliteration: "Bōryaku! Aderu no Wana!" (Japanese: 謀略！アデルの罠！)	Kyohei Yamaguchi	Keiichi Hasegawa	March 13, 2016
23	"Possessed! The Giant Eyecon!"; Transliteration: "Nyūkon! Dekkai Aikon!" (Japanese: 入魂！デッカい眼魂！)	Satoshi Morota	Takuro Fukuda	March 20, 2016
24	"Appearance! The Mysterious Warrior!"; Transliteration: "Shutsugen! Nazo no Senshi!" (Japanese: 出現！謎の戦士！)	Satoshi Morota	Nobuhiro Mouri	March 27, 2016
25	"Disaster! The Red Sky!"; Transliteration: "Ihen! Akai Sora!" (Japanese: 異変！赤い空！)	Katsuya Watanabe	Keiichi Hasegawa	April 3, 2016
26	"Conflict! The Terms of Resolution!"; Transliteration: "Kattō! Ketsudan no Jōken!" (Japanese: 葛藤！決断の条件！)	Katsuya Watanabe	Keiichi Hasegawa	April 10, 2016
27	"Do-or-Die! Ready for Infiltration!"; Transliteration: "Kesshi! Kakugo no Sennyū!" (Japanese: 決死！覚悟の潜入！)	Kyohei Yamaguchi	Takuro Fukuda	April 17, 2016
28	"Bursting! The Power of the Abyss!"; Transliteration: "Bakugen! Shin'en no Chikara!" (Japanese: 爆現！深淵の力！)	Kyohei Yamaguchi	Takuro Fukuda	April 24, 2016
29	"Second Coming! Ordeal of the Escape King!"; Transliteration: "Sairin! Dasshutsu-ō no Shiren!" (Japanese: 再臨！脱出王の試練！)	Koichi Sakamoto	Nobuhiro Mouri	May 1, 2016
30	"Forever! Cries of the Heart!"; Transliteration: "Eien! Kokoro no Sakebi!" (Japanese: 永遠！心の叫び！)	Koichi Sakamoto	Nobuhiro Mouri	May 8, 2016
31	"Bizarre! The Power of the Gammisers!"; Transliteration: "Kimyō! Ganmaizā no Chikara!" (Japanese: 奇妙！ガンマイザーの力！)	Katsuya Watanabe	Keiichi Hasegawa	May 15, 2016
32	"Reminiscence! The Hidden Heart!"; Transliteration: "Tsuioku! Himeta Kokoro!" (Japanese: 追憶！秘めた心！)	Katsuya Watanabe	Keiichi Hasegawa	May 22, 2016
33	"Miracle! Infinite Feelings!"; Transliteration: "Kiseki! Mugen no Omoi!" (Japanese: 奇跡！無限の想い！)	Katsuya Watanabe	Keiichi Hasegawa	May 29, 2016
34	"Wandering! The World of Dreams!"; Transliteration: "Meisō! Yume no Sekai!" (Japanese: 迷走！夢の世界！)	Kyohei Yamaguchi	Nobuhiro Mouri	June 5, 2016
35	"Real Worth! The Power of Fun!"; Transliteration: "Shinka! Tanoshisa no Chikara!" (Japanese: 真価！楽しさの力！)	Kyohei Yamaguchi	Nobuhiro Mouri	June 12, 2016
36	"Vehement! Idol Declaration!"; Transliteration: "Mōretsu! Aidoru Sengen!" (Japanese: 猛烈！アイドル宣言！)	Koichi Sakamoto	Keiichi Hasegawa	June 19, 2016
37	"Mastered! Everyone's Paths!"; Transliteration: "Shūtoku! Sorezore no Michi!" (Japanese: 修得！それぞれの道！)	Koichi Sakamoto	Keiichi Hasegawa	June 26, 2016
38	"Return! The Souls of Heroes!"; Transliteration: "Fukkatsu! Eiyū no Tamashii!" (Japanese: 復活！英雄の魂！)	Koichi Sakamoto	Nobuhiro Mouri	July 3, 2016
39	"Opposition! Father and Daughter!"; Transliteration: "Tairitsu! Chichi to Musume!" (Japanese: 対立！父と娘！)	Katsuya Watanabe	Takuro Fukuda	July 10, 2016
40	"Courage! A Tragic Resolution!"; Transliteration: "Yūki! Hisō na Ketsudan!" (Japanese: 勇気！悲壮な決断！)	Katsuya Watanabe	Takuro Fukuda	July 17, 2016
41	"Upheaval! The Secretary's Decision!"; Transliteration: "Gekidō! Chōkan no Ketsudan!" (Japanese: 激動！長官の決断！)	Kyohei Yamaguchi	Keiichi Hasegawa	July 24, 2016
42	"Astonishment! The Truth About the Hermit!"; Transliteration: "Gyōten! Sennin no Shinjitsu!" (Japanese: 仰天！仙人の真実！)	Kyohei Yamaguchi	Keiichi Hasegawa	July 31, 2016
43	"Connection! The Boy Genius!"; Transliteration: "Setsuzoku! Tensai Shōnen!" (Japanese: 接続！天才少年！)	Ryuta Tasaki	Nobuhiro Mouri	August 7, 2016
44	"Activation! The Terror of Demia!"; Transliteration: "Kidō! Demia no Kyōfu!" (Japanese: 起動！デミアの恐怖！)	Ryuta Tasaki	Nobuhiro Mouri	August 14, 2016
45	"Horror! A Disappearing World!"; Transliteration: "Senritsu! Kieyuku Sekai!" (Japanese: 戦慄！消えゆく世界！)	Katsuya Watanabe	Keiichi Hasegawa	August 21, 2016
46	"Duel! Words from the Swordsman!"; Transliteration: "Kettō! Kengō kara no Kotoba!" (Japanese: 決闘！剣豪からの言葉！)	Katsuya Watanabe	Keiichi Hasegawa	August 28, 2016
47	"Concord! Everyone's Resolutions!"; Transliteration: "Koō! Sorezore no Kakugo!" (Japanese: 呼応！それぞれの覚悟！)	Satoshi Morota	Takuro Fukuda	September 4, 2016
48	"End! The Chain of Sorrow!"; Transliteration: "Shūketsu! Kanashimi no Rensa!" (Japanese: 終結！悲しみの連鎖！)	Satoshi Morota	Takuro Fukuda	September 11, 2016
49	"Infinity! The Power of Humanity!"; Transliteration: "Mugen! Hito no Chikara!" (Japanese: 無限！人の力！)	Satoshi Morota	Takuro Fukuda	September 18, 2016
50 (Finale)	"Future! Connected Feelings!"; Transliteration: "Mirai! Tsunagaru Omoi!" (Japanese: 未来！繋がる想い！)	Osamu Kaneda	Takuro Fukuda	September 25, 2016

== Films ==
Kamen Rider Ghost made his first appearance as a cameo in the film Kamen Rider Drive: Surprise Future.

=== Super Movie War Genesis ===
Kamen Rider × Kamen Rider Ghost & Drive: Super Movie War Genesis (仮面ライダー×仮面ライダー ゴースト&ドライブ 超MOVIE大戦ジェネシス, Kamen Raidā × Kamen Raidā Gōsuto Ando Doraibu Chō Mūbī Taisen Jeneshisu) was released in Japanese theaters on December 12, 2015. It featured a crossover between Kamen Rider Ghost and Kamen Rider Drive. The events of the movie take place in an alternate timeline due to a space-time anomaly according to the novel.

=== Kamen Rider 1 ===
Kamen Rider 1 (仮面ライダー1号, Kamen Raidā Ichigō) was released in Japanese theaters on March 26, 2016. It is part of the 45th anniversary of the Kamen Rider Series, featuring the cast from Kamen Rider Ghost and a new form of Kamen Rider 1, with Hiroshi Fujioka reprising his role as his character. The events of the movie take place between Episode 35 and 36.

=== The 100 Eyecons and Ghost's Fated Moment ===
Kamen Rider Ghost the Movie: The 100 Eyecons and Ghost's Fated Moment (劇場版 仮面ライダーゴースト 100の眼魂とゴースト運命の瞬間, Gekijōban Kamen Raidā Gōsuto Hyaku no Aikon to Gōsuto Unmei no Toki) was released in Japanese theaters on August 6, 2016, double-billed with Doubutsu Sentai Zyuohger the Movie: The Exciting Circus Panic!. It introduces the antagonists Kamen Rider Dark Ghost/Extremer, three Kamen Rider Dark Necroms, and the movie's supporting protagonist Kamen Rider Zero Specter. It also features a cameo appearance of the next titular character, Kamen Rider Ex-Aid, who later reappeared in the final episode, along with the appearance of Bugstars, while Kamen Rider Genm only appeared in the two last episodes. The events of the movie take place between Episode 42 and 43.

=== Kamen Rider Heisei Generations ===
A Movie War film, titled Kamen Rider Heisei Generations: Dr. Pac-Man vs. Ex-Aid & Ghost with Legend Rider (仮面ライダー平成ジェネレーションズ Dr.パックマン対エグゼイド&ゴーストwithレジェンドライダー, Kamen Raidā Heisei Jenerēshonzu Dokutā Pakkuman Tai Eguzeido Ando Gōsuto Wizu Rejendo Raidā), was released in Japan on December 10, 2016. The film features Kamen Rider Ghost teaming up with Kamen Rider Ex-Aid, Kamen Rider Drive, Kamen Rider Gaim, and Kamen Rider Wizard as they battle against a virus based on Bandai Namco Entertainment's video game character, Pac-Man. The events of the film took place after the end of the main series.

=== Heisei Generations Final ===
A Movie War film, titled Kamen Rider Heisei Generations Final: Build & Ex-Aid with Legend Rider (仮面ライダー平成ジェネレーションズ FINAL ビルド&エグゼイドwithレジェンドライダー, Kamen Raidā Heisei Jenerēshonzu Fainaru Birudo Ando Eguzeido Wizu Rejendo Raidā) was released on December 9, 2017. Along the casts of Kamen Rider Build and Kamen Rider Ex-Aid, Shu Watanabe and Ryosuke Miura (Kamen Rider OOO), Sota Fukushi (Kamen Rider Fourze), Gaku Sano (Kamen Rider Gaim), and Shun Nishime (Kamen Rider Ghost) reprised their respective roles.

== Specials ==
=== Special episodes ===
- Kamen Rider Ghost: Ikkyu Eyecon Contention! Quick Wit Battle!! (仮面ライダーゴースト 一休眼魂争奪! とんち勝負（バトル）!!, Kamen Raidā Gōsuto Ikkyū Aikon Sōdatsu! Tonchi Batoru!!) is a special Televi-Kun DVD. It features both the Ikkyu Ghost Eyecon and the Pythagoras Ghost Eyecon.
- Kamen Rider Ghost: Ikkyu Intimacy! Awaken, My Quick Wit Power!! (仮面ライダーゴースト 一休入魂! めざめよ、オレのとんち力!!, Kamen Raidā Gōsuto Ikkyū Nyūkon! Mezameyo, Ore no Tonchi-ryoku!!) is Televi-Kun's "Hyper Battle DVD" (超（ハイパー）バトルDVD, Haipā Batoru Dī Bui Dī). It features both Kamen Rider Ghost Ikkyu Damashii and Kamen Rider Specter Pythagoras Damashii.
- Kamen Rider Ghost: Legendary! Riders' Souls! (仮面ライダーゴースト 伝説! ライダーの魂!, Kamen Raidā Gōsuto Densetsu! Raidā no Tamashii!) is a web series released on YouTube. It is connected to Kamen Rider 1 and features Kamen Rider Ghost and Kamen Rider Specter's Legend Rider Damashii confronting villains from past Kamen Rider Series. It comprises seven episodes, but the final episode is exclusive to the DVD.
- The Legend of Hero Alain (アラン英雄伝, Aran Eiyūden) is included as part of the Blu-ray releases of Kamen Rider Ghost. It comprises four episodes and focuses on a side story of Alain. The theme song is "TIMELESS BLUE" performed by SUNAHO.
- Kamen Rider Ghost: Truth! The Secret of Heroic Eyecons! (仮面ライダーゴースト 真相! 英雄眼魂のひみつ!, Kamen Raidā Gōsuto Shinsō! Eiyū Aikon no Himitsu!) is Televi-Kun's "Hyper Battle DVD". It takes place after the end of the series, revealing why Da Vinci wasn't chosen to be among the 15 Heroic Eyecons and closing several plotlines from the show and movies, while also introducing the actual Da Vinci Ghost Eyecon.

=== Ghost Re:Birth ===
Ghost Re:Birth: Kamen Rider Specter (ゴーストRE:BIRTH 仮面ライダースペクター, Gōsuto Ribāsu Kamen Raidā Supekutā) is a V-Cinema release that focuses on a side story of Makoto Fukami as Kamen Rider Specter, it is set after the end of the series and also features a flashback when Makoto first meet Alain. It features both final forms of both Specter and Necrom respectively. The V-Cinema was released on April 19, 2017. The theme song is "NEW WORLD" performed by Bentham. The film is written by Takuro Fukuda, and directed by Kazuya Kamihoriuchi.

=== Kamen Rider Saber × Ghost series ===
Kamen Rider Saber × Ghost (仮面ライダーセイバー×ゴースト, Kamen Raidā Seibā Gōsuto) is a web-exclusive series of Toei Tokusatsu Fan Club serves as a crossover between Kamen Rider Saber and Ghost, with Takeru Tenkūji and Kanon Fukami are recurrently starring characters of the series:

- Kamen Rider Saber × Ghost is the titular first entry of the web series released on May 23, 2021.
- Kamen Rider Specter × Blades (仮面ライダースペクター×ブレイズ, Kamen Raidā Supekutā Bureizu) is a sequel to the titular first entry of the web series released on June 27, 2021, featuring Kanon's transformation into Kamen Rider Kanon Specter.

== Novel ==
Novel: Kamen Rider Ghost: Memories to the Future (小説 仮面ライダーゴースト ～未来への記憶～, Shōsetsu Kamen Raidā Gōsuto ~Mirai e no Kioku~), written by Takuro Fukuda, is part of a series of spin-off novel adaptions of the Heisei Era Kamen Riders. The novel is split into three parts and focuses on the origin of the Ganma World, the history and destiny of Daitenkū-ji, and the events after Ghost Re:Birth: Kamen Rider Specter. The novel was released on November 17, 2017.

== Video game ==
Kamen Rider: Battride War Genesis (仮面ライダー バトライド・ウォー 創生, Kamen Raidā Batoraido Wō Sōsei), is the third installment of the Kamen Rider: Battride War series, was released on February 26, 2016, for the PlayStation consoles (PlayStation 3, PlayStation 4, and PlayStation Vita). It features characters from Kamen Rider Ghost, Kamen Rider Drive, characters in previous versions of the game that were included as NPCs or assistants, as well as the Shōwa era Kamen Riders.

== Cast ==
- Takeru Tenkūji (天空寺 タケル, Tenkūji Takeru): Shun Nishime (西銘 駿, Nishime Shun)
- Akari Tsukimura (月村 アカリ, Tsukimura Akari): Hikaru Ohsawa (大沢 ひかる, Ōsawa Hikaru)
- Makoto Fukami (深海 マコト, Fukami Makoto): Ryosuke Yamamoto (山本 涼介, Yamamoto Ryōsuke)
- Onari (御成): Takayuki Yanagi (柳 喬之, Yanagi Takayuki)
- Alain (アラン, Aran): Hayato Isomura (磯村 勇斗, Isomura Hayato)
- Shibuya (シブヤ): Takuya Mizoguchi (溝口 琢矢, Mizoguchi Takuya)
- Narita (ナリタ): Reo Kansyuji (勧修寺 玲旺, Kanshūji Reo)
- Yasushi Onodera (小野寺 靖, Onodera Yasushi): Yasuomi Sano (佐野 泰臣, Sano Yasuomi)
- Kanon Fukami (深海 カノン, Fukami Kanon): Mio Kudo (工藤 美桜, Kudō Mio)
- Fumi Fukushima (福嶋 フミ, Fukushima Fumi): Hisako Ohkata (大方 斐紗子, Ōkata Hisako)
- Chikara Saionji (西園寺 主税, Saionji Chikara): Yoshiyuki Morishita (森下 能幸, Morishita Yoshiyuki)
- Steve Bills (スティーブ・ビルズ, Sutību Biruzu): Thane Camus (セイン・カミュ, Sein Kamyu)
- Javel (ジャベル, Jaberu): Sotaro (聡太郎, Sōtarō)
- Igor (イゴール, Igōru): Hiroshi Yamamoto (山本 浩司, Yamamoto Hiroshi)
- Gyro (ジャイロ, Jairo): Seiji Takaiwa (高岩 成二, Takaiwa Seiji)
- Adel (アデル, Aderu), Gammisers (ガンマイザー, Ganmaizā; Voice; 35-45 and human form): Akihiro Mayama (真山 明大, Mayama Akihiro)
- Alia (アリア, Aria), Alicia (アリシア, Arishia): Reon Kadena (かでな れおん, Kadena Reon)
- Adonis (アドニス, Adonisu): Hiroshi Katsuno (勝野 洋, Katsuno Hiroshi)
- Ryū Tenkūji (天空寺 龍, Tenkūji Ryū): Kazuhiko Nishimura (西村 和彦, Nishimura Kazuhiko)
- Hermit/Edith (仙人／イーディス, Sennin/Īdisu): Naoto Takenaka (竹中 直人, Takenaka Naoto)

=== Voice cast ===
- Yurusen (ユルセン): Aoi Yūki (悠木 碧, Yūki Aoi)
- Ghost Driver (ゴーストドライバー, Gōsuto Doraibā), Eyecon Driver G (アイコンドライバーG, Aikon Doraibā Jī): m.c.A.T
- Mega Ulorder (メガウルオウダー, Mega Uruōdā): Peter von Gomm
- Hoodie Ghosts (パーカーゴースト, Pākā Gōsuto), Gamma Eyecons (眼魔眼魂, Ganma Aikon): Tomokazu Seki (関 智一, Seki Tomokazu)
- Gasai Gamma (画材眼魔, Gasai Ganma): Taiki Matsuno (松野大紀, Matsuno Taiki)
- Gammisers (ガンマイザー, Ganmaizā; 23-34, 47-49): Sayaka Ohara (大原 さやか, Ōhara Sayaka)
- Narrator: Kazuya Ichijō (一条 和矢, Ichijō Kazuya)

=== Guest cast ===
- Yoshinori Sonoda (園田 義則, Sonoda Yoshinori; 2, 46): Torata Nanbu (南部 虎弾, Nanbu Torata; of Tokyo Shock Boys)
- Mari Shirase (白瀬 マリ, Shirase Mari; 3): Yukari Taki (滝 裕可里, Taki Yukari)
- Nobuyoshi Hashiba (羽柴 信良, Hashiba Nobuyoshi; 4): Takeyuki Yue (湯江 健幸, Yue Takeyuki)
- Hideo Kuroda (黒田 秀夫, Kuroda Hideo; 4): Koichi Sudo (須藤 公一, Sudō Kōichi)
- Kenjiro Igarashi (五十嵐 健次郎, Igarashi Kenjirō; 9, 31–32): Moro Morooka (モロ 師岡)
- Yamato Kazakiri (風切 大和, Kazakiri Yamato; 24): Masaki Nakao (中尾 暢樹, Nakao Masaki)
- Yuki Shirai (白井 ユキ, Shirai Yuki; 29–30, 46): Arisa Komiya (小宮 有紗, Komiya Arisa)
- Honami (ホナミ; 36–37): Makoto Okunaka (奥仲 麻琴, Okunaka Makoto)
- Ako (アコ; 36–37): Rin Honoka (ほのか りん, Honoka Rin)
- Ryōsuke Shinozaki (篠崎 良介, Shinozaki Ryōsuke; 39–40): Takumi Tsutsui (筒井 巧, Tsutsui Takumi)
- Mitsuko Endo (遠藤 ミツコ, Endō Mitsuko; 43–44): Megumi Kobashi (小橋 めぐみ, Kobashi Megumi)
- Miyamoto Musashi (宮本 武蔵; 46): Mitsuru Karahashi (唐橋 充, Karahashi Mitsuru)
- Takeru's mother (49): Tomoka Kurokawa (黒川 智花, Kurokawa Tomoka)
- Kamen Rider Ex-Aid (仮面ライダーエグゼイド, Kamen Raidā Eguzeido; Voice; 50): Hiroki Iijima (飯島 寛騎, Iijima Hiroki)

== International broadcast ==
In Indonesia, the series aired in 2023 on RTV with an Indonesian dub.

== Theme songs ==
Opening theme

- "Warera Omou, Yue ni Warera Ari" (我ら思う、故に我ら在り; "We Think, Therefore We Are")
  - Lyrics & Composition: Show Ayanocozey
  - Arrangement: Takeshi Kiuchi
  - Artist: Kishidan
