= Osamu Kaneda =

- Born: August 31, 1949 (age 77); Japan
- Occupations: Film director, action director, stuntman

Osamu Kaneda (Japanese: 金田 治, born August 31, 1949) is a director, action director and a stuntman. He is the president and CEO of Japan Action Enterprise, and a graduate of Tokyo Designer Gakuin College.

== Filmography ==
Film direction
Year	Work
2016	Kamen Rider 1
2015	Kamen Rider × Kamen Rider Ghost & Drive: Super Movie War Genesis
2015	Gaim Gaiden
2014	Kamen Rider Gaim: Great Soccer Battle! Golden Fruits Cup!
2013	Kamen Rider × Super Sentai × Space Sheriff: Super Hero Taisen Z
2012	Space Sheriff Gavan: The Movie
2012	Kamen Rider × Super Sentai: Super Hero Taisen
2011	OOO, Den-O, All Riders: Let's Go Kamen Riders
2010	Kamen Rider × Kamen Rider × Kamen Rider The Movie: Cho-Den-O Trilogy Episode Red
2009	Kamen Rider Decade: All Riders vs. Dai-Shocker
2008	Saraba Kamen Rider Den-O: Final Countdown
2008	Kamen Rider Den-O & Kiva: Climax Deka
1995	Juukou B-Fighter

Television series direction
Year	Work
2015 -2016	Shuriken Sentai Ninninger
2014-2015	Kamen Rider Drive
2013-2014	Kamen Rider Gaim
2012-2013	Tokumei Sentai Go-Busters
2011	Sengoku Danshi
2010-2011	Kamen Rider OOO
2009	Kamen Rider Decade
2007-2008	Kamen Rider Den-O
2005-2006	Kamen Rider Hibiki
2001-2002	Kamen Rider Agito
2000-2001	Kamen Rider Kuuga
1996	B-Fighter Kabuto
1995	Juukou B-Fighter
1993	Tokusou Robo Janperson

Acting credits
Year	Work	Role
1974	The Street Fighter	
1974	Sister Street Fighter	Konosuke Mayuzumi
1977	J.A.K.Q. Dengekitai	Killer
1978	Spider-Man	Gil's body moth, De-Kanshi-Ban

Other credits
Year	Work	Type	Role
2005	Kamen Rider Hibiki & The Seven Senki	Film	Stunt coordinator
2002	Kamen Rider Ryuki: Episode Final	Film	Action director
1992	Shin Kamen Rider: Prologue	Video	Action director
1991	Choujin Sentai Jetman	Television series	Special effects director
1989	The Mobile Cop Jiban	Television series	Special effects director
1988	Kamen Rider Black RX	Television series	Special effects director
1988	Sekai Ninja Sen Jiraiya	Television series	Special effects director
1987	Kamen Rider Black	Television series	Action director
1986	Jikuu Senshi Spielban	Television series	Action director
1985	Kyojuu Tokusou Juspion	Television series	Action director
1984	Space Sheriff Shaider	Television series	Action coach
1983	Space Sheriff Sharivan	Television series	Action director
1979	Battle Fever J	Television series	Action director
1972	Android Kikaider	Television series	Stunt double
