= Kishidan =

Japanese rock band

Kishidan 氣志團
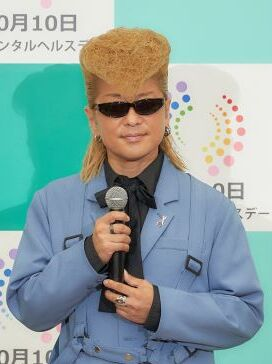
- Vocalist Show Ayanocozey in 2023

Background information
- Origin: Kisarazu, Chiba, Japan
- Genres: Pop rock, comedy rock
- Years active: 1997–present
- Labels: Tinstar (until 2001); EMI Japan (2002 to 2008) 影別苦須 虎津苦須 (Avex Trax) (since 2009)
- Members: Show Ayanocozey; Hikaru Saotome; Hitomi Saionji; Hoshi Grandmarnier; Showchikubai Shiratori; Yukinojoe Shiratori
- Past members: Ai Dokumamushi
- Website: www.kishidan.com

Kishidan (Japanese: 氣志團) is a Japanese rock band, formed in 1997. They have a retro image, wearing gakuran school uniforms and pompadour hairdos in the style of 1980s Japanese yankīs. In 2006, the members had differences of opinions and decided to take a break as being in the band was losing its enjoyment. After three years, during which time lead singer Show Ayanocozey began a solo career as the "DJ Ozma" character that he created at Kishidan shows, Kishidan announced their comeback on January 27, 2009. Their song "Omae Dattanda", released on November 10, 2009, is the 11th ending theme song of Naruto Shippuden. They are signed to Avex Trax (影別苦須 虎津苦須 sub-label) and are managed by Sony Music Artists. Their song "Warera Omou, Yue ni Warera Ari", released on December 9, 2015, is the opening theme song of Kamen Rider Ghost.

== Members ==
- Show "Show-yan" Ayanocozey (綾小路 翔, Ayanokōji Shō) — Vocals, Dragon Voice, Emcee and Guitar; born June 24, 1979
- Hikaru Saotome (早乙女 光, Saotome Hikaru) — Dance and Scream
- Hitomi "Tommy" Saionji (西園寺 瞳, Saionji Hitomi) — Guitar
- Hoshi "Ranma" Grandmarnier (星 グランマニエ, Hoshi Guranmanie) — Guitar. Joined the group in late 1998.
- Showchikubai "Matsu" Shiratori (白鳥 松竹梅, Shiratori Shōchikubai) — Bass guitar. Joined the group January 1999.

=== Currently suspended ===
- Yukinojoe "Yukki" Shiratori (白鳥 雪之丞, Shiratori Yukinojō) — Drums. On February 9, 2013 it was announced via Twitter that Yukki was taking time off to be treated for dystonia. In March 2014 the band's management stated that he would continue to be on an indefinite leave of absence.

=== Former members ===
- Ai "Love-chan" Dokumamushi (毒蝮愛) — Guitar. Member from 1997 to 1998.

== Stage personas ==
Their various uniforms, modeled after the short and long-coat bōsōzoku-preferred versions of old Japanese gakuran (boys' school uniforms), their matching bōsōzoku uniforms (the kind modeled on those worn by kamikaze pilots). Since the band started touring again in 2009, they have started wearing different styles of gakuran, as well as outfits from Tokyo-based fashion group, Saturday Nite.

The group's lyrics are predominantly about motorcycles, friendships, conflicts with school, and adolescent love.

Kishidan's hit songs "One Night Carnival" and "Zoku" were featured in Nintendo's Osu! Tatakae! Ouendan, and Moero! Nekketsu Rhythm Damashii Osu! Tatakae! Ouendan 2, respectively. The song "One Night Carnival" (a cover version) is used for a level that was inspired by one of Kishidan's live performances.

== Controversies ==
A February 2011 appearance on MTV Japan's Mega Vector program was heavily criticized by the Simon Wiesenthal Center after the band appeared in costumes resembling Nazi SS uniforms. The band's agency, Sony Music Artists, issued a statement of apology, noting that the band members "deeply regretted" their attire and that the clothing "was not meant to carry any ideological meaning whatsoever". Avex Group, the band's current record label, also sent an apology through its homepage.

In regards to the costume worn by Kishidan on MTV Network Japan's program, "Megavector", although it was not meant to carry any ideological meaning whatsoever, we deeply regret and apologize for the distress it has caused Simon Wiesenthal Center and all concerned. Members of Kishidan also deeply regret and apologize to you in this matter. We have duly received the words of advice from Simon Wiesenthal Center and take them very seriously. Kishidan will never again use this costume and it will be disposed of immediately. We will not broadcast, transmit, or distribute the video recording of Kishidan's performance with the said costume, and the recording will be disposed of immediately. The companies and artist Kishidan sincerely apologize for the insensitive action.

— Kimikazu Harada and Akira Takahashi, representing Sony Music Artists Inc.; and Shintaro Higuchi, representing Avex Group Holdings Inc.

== Live show ==
Kishidan embraces the theatrics of rock music in their live performance, and make extensive use of pop dancing and theatrics. Members of the band will sometimes pretend to perish mid-concert in battle with rival school gangs. Kishidan is also known to parody current popular Japanese songs, such as Matsudaira Ken's "Matsuken Samba II", and Nakashima Mika's "Glamorous Sky" from the film adaptation of Nana.

== Use of ateji ==
Since transferring to Avex, the band started to use ateji to promote their singles. In every promotional video, the band uses the ateji character for their Avex Trax sub-label, 影別苦須 虎津苦須 (which is pronounced the same as the main label (eibekkusu torakkusu) in the Japanese language).

== Discography ==
=== Albums ===
- 房総与太郎路薫狼琉 (Bousou Yotarou Rock'n'Roll) (2000-10-06)
- One Night Carnival (2001-06-22)
- 1/6 Lonely Night (2002-04-11)
- Boys' Color (2003-03-26)
- Too Fast to Live Too Young to Die (2004-03-17)
- 死無愚流 呼麗苦衝音+3 (Singles Collection +3) (2004-11-25)
- 愛 羅 武 勇 (Ai Ra Bu Yuu / "I Love You")(2005-10-26)
- Six Senses (2007-03-28)
- Kishidan Grateful EMI Years 2001-2008 房総魂: Song for Route 127 (2008-6-11)
- 木更津グラフィティ (Kisarazu Graffiti) (2010-09-15)
- 日本人 (Nipponjin) (2012-04-25)
- 氣志團入門 (Kishidan Nyuumon) (2013-09-11)
- 不良品 (Furyohin) (2016-01-27)
- 万謡集 (Manyoshu) (2017-08-09)
- ONE WAY GENERATION (2021-04-08)
- THE YⒶNK ROCK HERØES (2023-01-01)

=== Singles ===
- "One Night Carnival" (2002-05-29)
- "恋人/Love Balladは歌えない" ("Koibito/Love Ballad wa Utaenai") (2002-09-04)
- "スウィンギン・ニッポン" ("Swingin' Nippon") (2003-06-11)
- "Secret Love Story" (2003-10-29)
- "キラ キラ！" ("Kira Kira!") (2004-02-18)
- "結婚闘魂行進曲「マブダチ」" ("Kekkon Toukon Koushinkyoku "Mabudachi"") (2004-06-16)
- "族" ("Zoku") (2004-09-01)
- "夢見る頃を過ぎても" ("Yumemiru koro o Sugitemo") (2005-03-02)
- "俺達には土曜日しかない" ("Oretachi ni wa Doyoubi Shikanai") (2005-06-15)
- "You & Me Song" (2005-09-07)
- "The アイシテル" ("The Aishiteru") (2006-08-09)
- "さよなら世界/おまえだったんだ" ("Sayonara Sekai/Omae Dattan da") (2009-11-11)
- "愛してナイト!" ("Aishite Night!") (2010-09-01)
- "Super Boy Friend" (2012-09-05)
- "我ら思う、故に我ら在り" ("Warera Omou, Yue Ni Warera Ari") (2015-12-09)
- "No rain, No rainbow" (2020-09-23)

=== DVD ===
- 氣志團現象－外伝－DVD「恋人」 (2002-09-26)

(Kishidan Genshou ~ Gaiden ~ DVD "Koibito")

- 氣志團現象完全版－2000－2002－ (2003-03-05)

(Kishidan Genshou Kanzenban - 2000-2002 -)

- 氣志團万博2003木更津グローバル・コミュニケーション！！～Born in the toki no K-city～ (2003-11-27)

(Kishidan Banpaku 2003 Kisarazu Global Communication!! ~Born in the toki no K-city~)

- 氣志團現象大全: Samurai Spirit Suicide (2004-07-26)

(Kishidan Genshou Daizen -Samurai Spirit Suicide-)

- 氣志團現象最終章"The Last Song"in 東京ドーム (2005-02-23)

(Kishidan Genshou Saishuushou "The Last Song" in Tokyo Dome)

- 氣志團現象番外編 Never Ending Summer (2005-12-07)

(Kishidan Genshou Bangaihen Never Ending Summer)

- 氣志團万博2006 極東 Never Land (2006-12-20)

(Kishidan Banpaku 2006 Kyokutou Never Land)

- 氣志團列島-Japanolomania- NHKスーパーライブRe-edit (2008-6-11)
- 氣志團現象2009 Again and Again (2009-7-4)

(Kishidan Genshou 2009 Again and Again)

=== Other ===
- 氣志團現象（1）～さよならの果実たち～ (VHS 2001-12-06)

(Kishidan Genshou (1) ~Sayonara no Kajitsutachi~)

- 氣志團現象（2）～肌色だけのエンジェル～ (VHS 2002-01-23)

(Kishidan Genshou (2) ~Hadairo Dake no Angel~)

- 氣志團現象（3）～朝日の中のレクイエム～ (VHS 2002-02-27)

(Kishidan Genshou (3) ~Asahi no Naka no Requiem~)

- 族 (Zoku) (2004-09-01)
- 夢見る頃を過ぎても (Yumemiru koro wo Sugitemo) (2005-03-02)
- 俺達には土曜日しかない (Oretachi ni wa Doyoubi Shikanai) (2005-06-15)
- You & Me Song (2005-09-07)
- The アイシテル (The AISHITERU) (2006-08-09)
