= List of Kamen Rider Blade episodes =

This is a list of episodes of the Japanese tokusatsu television drama Kamen Rider Blade. It is the fourteenth installment in the Kamen Rider series and is a joint collaboration between Ishimori Productions and Toei. The series was preceded by Kamen Rider 555 and succeeded by Kamen Rider Hibiki. The plot centers on a group of people, known as "Kamen Riders", that protect humans from creatures known as the "Undead". The four Kamen Riders are portrayed by Takayuki Tsubaki, Kousei Amano, Ryōji Morimoto, and Takahiro Hojo. Kamen Rider Blade originally aired in Japan on Sunday mornings at 8:00 AM on the TV Asahi channel from January 25, 2004 to January 23, 2005. The series has also aired in the Philippines and South Korea. Each episode lasted approximately 23–25 minutes. The episodes were later released on DVD by Toei. Twelve volumes were released with the first eleven having four episodes per DVD and the twelfth volume with five episodes. Related titles include a theatrical release, Kamen Rider Blade: Missing Ace released on September 11, 2004, and a V-cinema release, Kamen Rider Blade: Blade vs. Blade.

== Episodes ==
No.	Title	Directed by	Written by	Original release date
1	"The Indigo Warrior"; Transliteration: "Shikon no Senshi" (Japanese: 紫紺の戦士)	Hidenori Ishida	Shōji Imai	January 25, 2004
Kazuma Kenzaki, rides to meet up with Sakuya Tachibana, who is fighting the Bat Undead in a cave. Meanwhile, Kotaro Shirai is exploring the cave to find information about the Kamen Riders and sees Kenzaki revert to human. The two riders return to BOARD headquarters where Tachibana questions the chief, Kei Karasuma, what BOARD's intentions are. Upon returning home, Kenzaki is evicted and meets Kotaro again who offers Kenzaki a place to stay. That night, the headquarters is attacked by the Locust Undead.
2	"The Mysterious Rider"; Transliteration: "Nazo no Raidā" (Japanese: 謎のライダー)	Hidenori Ishida	Shōji Imai	February 1, 2004
After the Locust Undead destroys the BOARD facilities, Blade fights and seals it. With the facilities destroyed and the chief kidnapped, everyone suspects Garren. Kenzaki and Shiori Hirose collect what equipment they can and set up a temporary headquarters at Kotaro's house. Soon after, the Plant Undead begins terrorizing people and Kotaro's niece, Amane, is trapped by it. Blade goes to find her, but she is saved by Hajime Aikawa, who lives with Amane and her mother.
3	"Their Secret..."; Transliteration: "Karera no Himitsu..." (Japanese: 彼らの秘密…)	Nobuhiro Suzumura	Shōji Imai	February 8, 2004
Once the Plant Undead is sealed by Chalice, Blade asks to join forces, but is rejected. Shiori is able to contact Karasuma and they begin searching for him. When the Deer Undead appears, Garren goes to fight it but is unable it defeat it until Blade shows up. Blade seals the Undead and questions Tachibana's intentions. Tachibana then tells him that the Kamen Rider System is killing them.
4	"Immortality's Mysteries"; Transliteration: "Eien no Inochi no Nazo" (Japanese: 永遠の命の謎)	Nobuhiro Suzumura	Shōji Imai; Sōkichi Imai	February 15, 2004
After Tachibana confirmed that Karasuma and the BOARD researchers released the Undead, Shiori refuses to believe it because her father was a researcher with BOARD. She eventually finds Karasuma and Tachibana, and Tachibana explains his intentions. The Moth Undead begins terrorizing people and Chalice hunts it down because it attacked his home. Shiori brings Kotaro to Karasuma, but Karasuma's body spontaneously combusts when they arrive.
5	"The Challenge to the Past"; Transliteration: "Kako e no Chōsen" (Japanese: 過去への挑戦)	Takao Nagaishi	Shōji Imai	February 22, 2004
Tachibana meets up with Shiori again and informs her that Karasuma's body was fake and set up to burn. Amane insists on going to a cave where people can supposedly hear the voices of the dead. She convinces Kotaro and Kenzaki to take her, but when they get there, she's poisoned by the Centipede Undead. Upon hearing this, Hajime rushes to find the Undead. He tells Kenzaki that they can get the antibody from the Undead but only if it's alive. Garren hunts down the Undead and fights it until Chalice and Blade appear. Chalice fights the Undead while scanning its body for the antibody and Blade fights Garren to prevent him from killing the Undead.
6	"Chalice's True Identity"; Transliteration: "Karisu no Shōtai" (Japanese: カリスの正体)	Takao Nagaishi	Shōji Imai	February 29, 2004
Once Chalice obtained the antibody, he sealed the Centipede Undead. Kenzaki then asks Hajime if he is Chalice, but he admits nothing and tells him that no one wants to know the truth. Kenzaki and Kotaro return home to find a note left by Shori. She left and apologized because she thinks he father released the Undead. Tachibana has been staying at an old friend's, Sayoko's, office to find out what is wrong with him. Karasuma finds her and tells her that Tachibana's problem is only psychological. After Kenzaki and Kotaro find Shiori, they are attacked and Kenzaki is kidnapped.
7	"The Trapped Two"; Transliteration: "Torawareta Ni-gō" (Japanese: 囚われた2号)	Satoshi Morota	Shōji Imai	March 7, 2004
Kenzaki is taken to a facility where he is studied and forced to fight an Undead. Tachibana encounters a mysterious Undead named Isaka, but was forced to retreat. He later meets up with Shiori and Kotaro and goes to find Kenzaki. Hajime finds Isaka and follows him to where Kenzaki is being held. After watching Blade fight, he joins the fight against Blade. Garren shows up to assist Blade but is overcome by the Trilobite Undead.
8	"The Revived People"; Transliteration: "Yomigaetta Mono-tachi" (Japanese: 甦った者たち)	Satoshi Morota	Shōji Imai	March 14, 2004
Karasuma shows up to assist the Riders with a distraction. Blade saves Garren and seals the Undead. Chalice stops fighting to save the Kurihara family from a bomb Isaka left in their restaurant. Karasuma tells everyone the origin of the Rider System. After being unable to overcome his fears, Tachibana decides to try to live a normal life. Kenzaki believes Hajime to be an Undead and after searching for him they fight.
9	"A Fighter's Destiny"; Transliteration: "Tatakau Mono no Unmei" (Japanese: 戦う者の運命)	Hidenori Ishida	Shōji Imai	March 21, 2004
The Zebra Undead begins terrorizing people and Tachibana decides to fight again, revealing his secret to Sayoko. Blade stops his fight with Chalice to assist Garren, but the Undead flees. After leaving the Kurihara family, Hajime meets a poor musician, Jin, and stays with him. Kenzaki informs everyone that he believes Hajime is an Undead and Kotaro rushes to tell his family. When talking to them, he realizes that though Hajime is an Undead, he's saved them twice and decides not to tell them. Garren is later kidnapped by Isaka, the Peacock Undead.
10	"The Manipulated Warrior"; Transliteration: "Ayatsurareta Senshi" (Japanese: 操られた戦士)	Hidenori Ishida	Shōji Imai	March 28, 2004
Isaka tells Tachibana that he is now stronger because of a treatment he gave him. Garren is able to fight again and seals the Zebra Undead. Hajime sends Jin to check up on the Kurihara family. Tachibana meets Sayoko and she finds a strange plant on him. Isaka offers the treatment to Kenzaki but he refuses and fights him. Isaka then calls Tachibana to aid him in his fight against Blade.
11	"The Whereabouts of Each"; Transliteration: "Onoono no Ibasho" (Japanese: 各々の居場所)	Nobuhiro Suzumura	Junichi Miyashita	April 4, 2004
Garren arrives to fight Blade and overpowers him until Shirai intervenes. Hajime hunts down the Jaguar Undead but is unsuccessful. Sayako meets Kenzaki and tells everyone of the plant she found on Tachibana. She is later attacked by the Undead and Blade arrives to save her. While Blade was sealing the Jaguar Undead, Garren goes to fight the Category Ace Spider Undead.
12	"Category Ace"; Transliteration: "Kategorī Ēsu" (Japanese: カテゴリーΑ)	Nobuhiro Suzumura	Junichi Miyashita	April 11, 2004
Blade rushes to help Garren fight the Category Ace but it proves too much for them both. While helping Jin, Hajime begins to miss the Kurihara family. The Shell Undead terrorizes the docks and Chalice fights and seals it. Meanwhile, Blade and Garren attempt to seal the Category Ace Undead again.
13	"The Golden-Threaded Trap"; Transliteration: "Kin'iro no Ito no Wana" (Japanese: 金色の糸の罠)	Takao Nagaishi	Shōji Imai	April 18, 2004
Blade and Garren fight over who will seal the Category Ace and it escapes. Later than night it disperses tiny spiders into the wind. The Lion Undead appears and is kidnapping those that a tiny spider has attached to. Blade saves a young boy named Mutsuki Kamijo from being abducted. Garren and Chalice encounter each other on their way to find the Category Ace. Isaka arrives to help Garren and they send Chalice down a ravine.
14	"Ace Sealed!"; Transliteration: "Ēsu Fūin!" (Japanese: エース封印!)	Takao Nagaishi	Shōji Imai	April 25, 2004
Blade finds Hajime at the bottom of the ravine and tends to his wounds. The Category Ace continues hunt people and spread spiders. Sayoko confronts Tachibana about his treatments from Isaka. While Tachibana seals the Category Ace, Isaka hunts down Sayoko. When Isaka demands the Ace card, Garren refuses and is defeated. Hajime discovers that the Kurihara family is kidnapped by the Dragonfly Undead.
15	"Fate's Conformer"; Transliteration: "Unmei no Tekigōsha" (Japanese: 運命の適合者)	Satoshi Morota	Shōji Imai	May 2, 2004
With the acquisition of a new Ace card, a new Kamen Rider belt was created. Several people were selected to become this new Rider, but none were able to transform. Shirai is greatly troubled since his sister and Amane are in constant danger with Hajime's presence. Tachibana also meets the Peacock Undead and faces him for the last time. As Garren, Tachibana successfully avenged his girlfriend when he defeated and sealed the Peacock Undead.
16	"Leangle's Power"; Transliteration: "Rengeru no Chikara" (Japanese: レンゲルの力)	Satoshi Morota	Shōji Imai	May 9, 2004
After sealing the Peacock Undead, Tachibana decides to return his buckle to Karasuma. After staring at the club change card, Shirai falls under control of the Spider Undead and attempts to transform. Kenzaki stops him but the belt vanishes in the commotion. Karasuma leaves for Tibet to find information to help them. Mutsuki finds the belt and falls under control of the Spider Undead. Chalice finds the Dragonfly Undead and Blade follows him. Chalice fights the Undead while the humans are around, not thinking about them. Blade becomes unsure whether him and Chalice could fight side by side, but after questioning, Chalice refuses as fighting alone is all he knows how to do. After Chalice seals the Undead, they are attacked by Leangle.
17	"The Evil Belt"; Transliteration: "Jaaku na Beruto" (Japanese: 邪悪なベルト)	Hidenori Ishida	Toshiki Inoue	May 16, 2004
During their fight, Leangle unseals one of Blade's and Chalice's cards. Leangle then reseals Blade's card as his own. Kenzaki asks Hajime if he's alright, but he moves away and repeats that he won't join anyone. Kenzaki becomes worried as he realises that the Leangle must be strong as he one sidedly defeated Chalice. After the fight, Leangle faints and Mutsuki is back. He doesn't know what he has done awhile back except that he transformed. Kenzaki tells Kotaro and Shiori about the new Rider (Leangle) as Tachibana walks in. Tachibana says he knows about him and that he's a highschool student. They get worried as they know that the belt is possessed by evil will as their Chief had said. Kenzaki asks Tachibana to search for the boy together, but Tachibana hesitates. Kenzaki runs off to get the elder's belt and gives it to him. Tachibana is unwilling to do so, saying that he doesn't need it and that he still can't fight. Mutsuki's life begins to be positively affected by the new belt and becomes excited about becoming a Kamen Rider. Tachibana sees his old senpai named Kiryu. Kenzaki goes looking for Mutsuki and continues to run into him without realizing who he is until he transforms into Leangle to fight the Boar Undead. Leangle fights Blade.
18	"Spirits That Manipulate Darkness"; Transliteration: "Kurayami o Ayatsuru Tamashii" (Japanese: 暗闇を操る魂)	Hidenori Ishida	Toshiki Inoue	May 23, 2004
While fighting Blade, Leangle unseals three more of Blade's cards. Leangle suddenly reverts to Mutsuki, who was unaware of what he was doing, and Kenzaki takes his belt away. Tachibana meets up with Kiryu and sees what a cruel person he's become. Kiryuu judges and executes people if he thinks he should. The belt suddenly disappears and finds its way back to Mutsuki and he falls even more under the Spider Undead's control. Mutsuki's personality changes, too. Mutsuki tries to throw the belt away but it returns to him and transforms into Leangle. The Boar, Deer, Locust, and Jaguar Undead show up and Leangle, Blade and Chalice go to fight them. While fighting with Blade, Leangle is defeated and Kiryu picks up the belt.
19	"One Who Conquers Darkness"; Transliteration: "Ankoku o Seisu Mono" (Japanese: 暗黒を征す者)	Hidenori Ishida	Toshiki Inoue	May 30, 2004
Kiryu beats Chalice and tells Tachibana to fight. As he leaves, the Undead leave as well. Hajime returns to the Kurihara family wounded. Tachibana finds Kiryu and tries to reason with him. Mutsuki returns to his normal life, but ends up stealing Garren's belt to trade it for Leangle's belt. Kiryu refuses and Blade fights Leangle to get the belt back. Tachibana grabs his belt and transforms into Garren and defeats Kiryu. Mutsuki then picks up the belt, transforms into Leangle, and kills Kiryu. Blade reseals the Undead and the Boar Undead.
20	"The Target is Kotaro"; Transliteration: "Hyōteki wa Kotarō" (Japanese: 標的は虎太郎)	Takao Nagaishi	Shōji Imai	June 6, 2004
Kenzaki and Tachibana try finding Mutsuki to get the belt back, but he escapes them. Mutsuki decides to gain control of Leangle. The Centipede Undead that Leangle unsealed is terrorizing people, but Shiori's detection system is sabotaged. Two new high class Undead show up with a plot to take out Kenzaki. Chalice fights and seals the Centipede Undead.
21	"Battles That Feel for Friends"; Transliteration: "Tomo o Omou Tatakai" (Japanese: 友を思う戦い)	Takao Nagaishi	Shōji Imai	June 13, 2004
Tachibana and Mutsuki arrive as Chalice seals the Undead. As Chalice fights Garren, Leangle takes control of Mutsuki again, but the fight ends quickly. After fighting the Capricorn Undead, Kenzaki brings Kotaro back home. Tachibana decides to train Mustuki so he can control the belt and Tachibana learns about Mutsuki's nightmares. The Orchid Undead traps Kotaro and the Capricorn Undead fights Kenzaki without his belt. Chalice frees Shirai and the Orchid Undead flees. Blade then seals the Capricorn Undead.
22	"The Escape From Darkness"; Transliteration: "Yami Kara no Dasshutsu" (Japanese: 闇からの脱出)	Satoshi Morota	Shō Aikawa	June 27, 2004
Tachibana continues to train Mutsuki to overcome the Spider Undead. A friend of the Kurihara family, Kamioka, takes Hajime on a photo shoot. Garren and Leangle try to seal the Mole Undead, but Mutsuki loses control again and is dragged underground. While on the job at the zoo, Hajime is attacked by the Orchid Undead. The Eagle Undead arrives and drives the Orchid Undead away. While Mutsuki tries to find a reason to face and seal the Undead, Blade and Garren become overwhelmed by the Mole Undead.
23	"Who Are You?"; Transliteration: "Omae wa Dare da?" (Japanese: お前は誰だ?)	Satoshi Morota	Shō Aikawa	July 4, 2004
Mutsuki overcomes his fear and seals the Mole Undead. Kamioka begins questioning Hajime's presence at the Kurihara house. The Eagle Undead kidnaps her to trap Hajime and steals his Change Card. Blade arrives and sees Hajime transform into the Dragonfly Undead. The Orchid Undead attacks Mutsuki but flees. Blade retrieves Hajime's Change Card from the Eagle Undead and seals him. Kamioka discovers Hajime's secret but now believes in his goodness.
24	"Mysterious Hunters"; Transliteration: "Nazo no Hantā" (Japanese: 謎のハンター)	Kenkō Satō	Shō Aikawa	July 11, 2004
The Wolf Undead is changing people into werewolves. While fighting them at an amusement park, Leangle meets a group of human Undead Hunters. Leangle, Blade, and Garren encounter the Wolf, Orchid, and Elephant Undead, but they all escape. The Undead Hunters meet with Kenzaki and Garren to discuss an alliance. They help the Hunters complete a new bike, Black Fang.
25	"A Traitor's Sprint"; Transliteration: "Uragiri no Shissō" (Japanese: 裏切りの疾走)	Kenkō Satō	Shō Aikawa	July 18, 2004
The Wolf Undead steals Black Fang as Garren and Blade try to retrieve it. Chalice chases after the Orchid Undead, but Shirai finds her and heals her wound. Kenzaki and Tachibana find Shinmei, the leader of the Hunter, and discover that he is the Wolf Undead, so they chase him to the docks and seal him. Chalice finds the Orchid Undead and seals her.
26	"The Power Which Moves Me"; Transliteration: "Ore o Ugokasu Chikara" (Japanese: 俺を動かす力)	Takao Nagaishi	Shōji Imai	July 25, 2004
The Elephant Undead arrives and defeats Blade and Garren. A strange man, Noboru Shima, shows up at Kotaro's house with news from Karasuma. The Spider Undead begins to regain control of Mutsuki. The Elephant Undead seeks out Chalice and wounds him. Everyone learns that Shima is actually the Tarantula Undead, though he still wishes to help. While fighting the Elephant Undead, Shima gives Blade a Rouse Absorber, which transforms him into Jack form. He then seals the Undead.
27	"The Trembling Heart..."; Transliteration: "Yureugoku Kokoro..." (Japanese: 揺れ動く心…)	Takao Nagaishi	Shōji Imai	August 1, 2004
Mutsuki begins to falls under the control of the Spider Undead again. The Buffalo Undead appears and Garren and Blade rush to seal it. Shima confronts Leangle about releasing Mutsuki, but the Spider Undead persists. After Tachibana is wounded by Mutsuki, Shima attempts to properly seal the Spider Undead in order to save Mutsuki. While on the way to stop Shima, Blade encounters the Buffalo Undead and seals it.
28	"A Dangerous Gamble!?"; Transliteration: "Kiken na Kake!?" (Japanese: 危険な賭け!?)	Satoshi Morota	Shōji Imai	August 8, 2004
Leangle fights Shima, but Blade arrives to stop them. While Shima and the others think of a plan, Mutsuki continues to struggle against the Spider Undead. While trying to find Mutsuki, the Woodpecker Undead begins attacking people and Garren goes to seal it. Leangle and Shima meet again to fight. Blade arrives to stop them, but is unable to. Shima allows himself to be sealed by Leangle.
29	"The Two Chalices"; Transliteration: "Futari no Karisu" (Japanese: 2人のカリス)	Satoshi Morota	Toshiki Inoue	August 15, 2004
Azumi, the Serpent Undead, finds Hajime and fights him with the help of the Tortoise Undead. Garren and Blade show up to help as Chalice staggers away. Having lost his memory, Hajime encounters Ryo Mikami, a takoyaki vendor that looks like him. After the vendor shakes off his initial shock, Tyo proposes that the two trade identities in order to avoid a life he feels is too difficult. Posing as Hajime, Ryo is found by Amane and taken back to Kenzaki and the others. Meanwhile, Hajime begins to blend into Ryo's life.
30	"Lost Memories"; Transliteration: "Ushinawareta Kioku" (Japanese: 失われた記憶)	Satoshi Morota	Toshiki Inoue	August 22, 2004
The Serpent Undead continues to search for Hajime. Ryo learns about Hajime's identity, and tries to get his life back. Ryo's girlfriend, Michi, learns the truth about Ryo and Hajime, but is happier with Hajime. Michi and Mikami's fathers have a vendor contest which is interrupted by the Serpent Undead. Hajime regains his memory and seals her. The Tortoise Undead intercepts Blade and Garren on their way to the battle. Hajime arrives and gives Garren the Queen card. Garren then transforms into Jack form and seals the Undead.
31	"The 53rd Being"; Transliteration: "Gojū-san-ban-me no Sonzai" (Japanese: 53番目の存在)	Takao Nagaishi	Shō Aikawa	September 5, 2004
While terrorizing people, Leangle is photographed by King, the Caucasus Undead in human guise. Kenzaki asks Hajime to join them, but Tachibana does not trust him. King creates a website to slander the Kamen Riders and everyone seeks him out. Kenzaki encounters King, but has his Blay Buckle stolen by the Scarab Undead, who can stop time. Tachibana finds Mutsuki in a bar and learns of Hajime true identity as the Joker. Kenzaki retrieves his Blay Buckle, but Hajime is abducted by the two other Undead. Kenzaki then encounters Trial D, an Undead that cannot be sealed.
32	"The Destroyer's Secret"; Transliteration: "Hakaisha no Himitsu" (Japanese: 破壊者の秘密)	Takao Nagaishi	Shō Aikawa	September 12, 2004
Garren arrives to assist Blade and drives off the new Undead. Tachibana tells everyone about Hajime's identity as the Joker. Meanwhile, King holds Hajime and forces him to transform into his Joker form, which he uses to escape. Tachibana meets Shiori's father, who is behind the Trials. Kenzaki finds Hajime and learns about how he changed from the Joker to Hajime Aikawa. King and the Scarab Undead appear and fight Blade. Hajime helps Blade seal the Scarab Undead while King flees.
33	"The Targeted Kenzaki"; Transliteration: "Nerawareta Kenzaki" (Japanese: 狙われた剣崎)	Kunio Iki	Shō Aikawa	September 19, 2004
Blade and Garren fight over what should be done about Hajime. Shiori's father contacts Tachibana and shows him the Trials. Kenzaki encounters King and learns that Hajime needs his cards to prevent his transformation into Joker form. Kenzaki is defeated and later ambushed by Trial D.
34	"Category King"; Transliteration: "Kategorī Kingu" (Japanese: カテゴリーK)	Kunio Iki	Shō Aikawa	September 26, 2004
Kenzaki realized what was Trial D's motive. He decided to leave town to avoid further harm to other people. Mutsuki battled Hajime into a battle but was attacked by his Fusion Wolf form instead. King also gave Mutsuki Chalice's cards. King was surprised that his popularity grew but was interfered by Blade instead. Blade finally sealed his final deck card, Evolution Caucasus. He also managed to fuse into King Form and destroyed Trial D with Royal Straight Flush.
35	"A Dangerous Transformation!?"; Transliteration: "Kiken na Henshin!?" (Japanese: 危険な変身!?)	Satoshi Morota	Shō Aikawa	October 3, 2004
Another Trial Undead is hot on Kenzaki's trail, he can also use Kenzaki's moves! Meanwhile, Hajime can no longer control himself and fights assuming his Joker form.
36	"Strongest Form"; Transliteration: "Saikyō Fōmu" (Japanese: 最強フォーム)	Satoshi Morota	Shō Aikawa	October 10, 2004
Hajime has been taken over by his Joker form. No longer in control of himself, he cannot see the differences from humans and Undead and it's Kenzaki's King form to blame.
37	"Towards a New Destiny"; Transliteration: "Arata na Unmei e" (Japanese: 新たな運命へ)	Takao Nagaishi	Shō Aikawa	October 17, 2004
In order to get back Hajime from his Joker form, Kenzaki asks Mutsuki to give him the 5 cards of the Chalice deck that are in Mutsuki's hands, but for that he must let Mutsuki have his Rouse Absorber. Kenzaki makes the deal and with Tachibana, obtains the King of Hearts card. Hajime uses the card to finally suppress the Joker form and defeat the Trial.
38	"One Who Takes Hold of Destiny"; Transliteration: "Unmei o Tsukamu Mono" (Japanese: 運命を掴む者)	Takao Nagaishi	Shō Aikawa	October 24, 2004
Hajime's problem was solved as he can turn back into a human, but the new problem is on Kenzaki as he and Mutsuki have been tricked by Shiori to fight each other, and Leangle forces Blade to change into King Form. But he knows the King Form is fighting like crazy, but then Chalice comes with the Wild Form and suppresses the power of Blade's King Form.
39	"Reunion...Father and Daughter"; Transliteration: "Saikai...Chichi to Musume" (Japanese: 再会…父と娘)	Hidenori Ishida	Junichi Miyashita	October 31, 2004
Yoshido captures Mutsuki to create a new trial named Trial G, based on his Rider data. Meanwhile, Blade was followed by a new Trial, without knowing that it is Yoshito in disguise.
40	"Parting With the Past"; Transliteration: "Kako to no Ketsubetsu" (Japanese: 過去との訣別)	Hidenori Ishida	Junichi Miyashita	November 14, 2004
Shiori uses herself as bait to meet Yoshito (Trial B) so that the Riders can destroy him. Unfortunately, Trial G interfered and they have to stop him before it targets Shiori.
41	"A Desire to Get Stronger"; Transliteration: "Tsuyokunaritai" (Japanese: 強くなりたい)	Nobuhiro Suzumura	Shō Aikawa	November 21, 2004
Mutsuki wishes that he will be the strongest Rider by fighting against the Tiger Undead but loses instead. But while confronting the Giraffa Undead, the Tiger Undead learns the truth behind the "Battle Fight" before facing Tennoji and his creation: The Titan.
42	"Leangle Revives"; Transliteration: "Rengeru Fukkatsu" (Japanese: レンゲル復活)	Nobuhiro Suzumura	Shō Aikawa	November 28, 2004
After being poisoned by the venom of the Scorpion Undead, one of the two Undead fused into the Titan. Mutsuki attacks his friends and turns into the Category Ace. Everyone is not spared even his girlfriend, Nozomi. The Tiger Undead has already been sealed and Mutsuki is forcing himself to fight Blade in his King Form. Will the transformation be complete or a failure?
43	"Foe or Friend?"; Transliteration: "Teki ka Mikata ka?" (Japanese: 敵か味方か?)	Takao Nagaishi	Toshiki Inoue	December 5, 2004
Using the abilities of the Chameleon Undead, the Titan tricks the Riders into fighting each other.
44	"Four of a Kind"; Transliteration: "Fō Kādo" (Japanese: フォーカード)	Takao Nagaishi	Toshiki Inoue	December 12, 2004
All the Riders get together to fight the Titan, and Blade's King form finds a new attack combo, the Four Card.
45	"The New Card"; Transliteration: "Arata na Kādo" (Japanese: 新たなカード)	Satoshi Morota	Shō Aikawa	December 19, 2004
New Undead are born, and its identified as a fifth ace Keroberos, now all 4 Riders must face this powerful new Undead.
46	"The Ruler's Seal"; Transliteration: "Shihaisha no Fūin" (Japanese: 支配者の封印)	Satoshi Morota	Shō Aikawa	December 26, 2004
Though Keroberos was sealed, Tennoji reveals his true plan as he fuses with the sealed Undead to become all powerful. However, once Tennoji is defeated, the Giraffa Undead murders him and takes the Keroberos card, allowing the true Battle Fight to begin.
47	"Garren Eliminated"; Transliteration: "Gyaren Shōmetsu" (Japanese: ギャレン消滅)	Satoshi Morota	Shō Aikawa	January 9, 2005
There are only two Undead left and if it's up to Garren, the Joker goes first, but in the heat of battle, will he change his mind or die trying?
48	"Prologue to Destruction"; Transliteration: "Horobi e no Joshō" (Japanese: 滅びへの序章)	Takao Nagaishi	Shō Aikawa	January 16, 2005
With Garren out of the game and Hajime declared the winner, Blade and Leangle are the world's last hope, to seal the Joker. However, they have to deal with the endless army of Dark Roaches that are systematically destroying the human race.
49 (Finale)	"The Eternal Trump"; Transliteration: "Eien no Kirifuda" (Japanese: 永遠の切り札)	Takao Nagaishi	Shō Aikawa	January 23, 2005
Kenzaki confronts Hajime in an all out battle with the human race's existence on the line. However, can Blade manage to save the world on his own or does the Joker have a plan that will negate the Battle Fight's end game?

== DVD releases ==
Cover of the first Kamen Rider Blade DVD

DVD release	# of episodes	Run time	Release date (Region 2)
Volume 1	4	94 min	2004-08-06
Volume 2	4	93 min	2004-09-21
Volume 3	4	93 min	2004-10-21
Volume 4	4	93 min	2004-11-21
Volume 5	4	93 min	2004-12-10
Volume 6	4	93 min	2005-01-21
Volume 7	4	93 min	2005-02-21
Volume 8	4	90 min	2005-03-21
Volume 9	4	93 min	2005-04-21
Volume 10	4	93 min	2005-05-21
Volume 11	4	93 min	2005-06-21
Volume 12	5	116 min	2005-07-21
