= List of Japanese actors =

This is a list of Japanese actors who have their own Wikipedia articles.

Note: All names must be written in standard [given name] + [family name] order and arranged in alphabetical order by family name.

== A ==
- Hiroshi Abe
- Tsuyoshi Abe
- Osamu Adachi
- Hiroki Aiba
- Masaki Aiba
- Kazuyuki Aijima
- Show Aikawa
- Jin Akanishi
- Eiji Akaso
- Kousei Amano
- Kenji Anan
- Masanobu Andō
- Sota Aoyama
- Hirofumi Arai
- Hirofumi Araki
- Towa Araki
- Tadanobu Asano
- Kai Atō
- Kiyoshi Atsumi
- Gō Ayano

== B ==
- Daisuke Ban
- Eiji Bandō
- Bandō Mitsugorō X
- Bunta Sugawara

== C ==
- Yudai Chiba
- Sonny Chiba (Shinichi Chiba)

== D ==
- Sandayū Dokumamushi
- Koichi Domoto
- Tsuyoshi Domoto

== E ==
- Yōsuke Eguchi
- Eita
- Kenichi Endō
- Yuya Endo
- Ken'ichi Enomoto

== F ==
- Tatsuya Fuji
- Takahiro Fujimoto
- Hiroshi Fujioka
- Makoto Fujita
- Tatsuya Fujiwara
- Mitsuru Fukikoshi
- Sota Fukushi
- Masaharu Fukuyama
- Yuki Furukawa
- Yūta Furukawa
- Akira Fuse

== H ==
- Takashi Hagino
- Masato Hagiwara
- Tatsuomi Hamada
- Yoshio Harada
- Kento Hayashi
- Masahiro Higashide
- Hideo Higashikokubaru (stage name: Sonomanma Higashi)
- Hiroaki Hirata
- Takahiro Hōjō
- Kanata Hongō
- Kei Horie
- Masami Horiuchi
- Shigeki Hosokawa
- Hyde (Hideto Takarai)

== I ==
- Ichikawa Raizō VIII
- Koide Ichijūrō
- Utaemon Ichikawa
- Hiroki Iijima
- Chosuke Ikariya
- Ryō Ikebe
- Sosuke Ikematsu
- Toma Ikuta
- Yu Inaba
- Atsuhiro Inukai
- Tatsuya Isaka
- Yūsuke Iseya
- Renji Ishibashi
- Ryo Ishibashi
- Takuya Ishida
- Yujiro Ishihara
- Saburo Ishikura
- Rihito Itagaki
- Asahi Ito
- Atsushi Itō
- Hayato Ichihara
- Hayato Isomura
- Arata Iura
- Shigeru Izumiya

== K ==
- Takeshi Kaga
- Teruyuki Kagawa
- Shouma Kai
- Masaki Kaji
- Kenta Kamakari
- Kazuya Kamenashi
- Yusuke Kamiji
- Ryunosuke Kamiki
- Fūju Kamio
- Ryuji Kamiyama
- Jun Kaname
- Daichi Kaneko
- Takeshi Kaneshiro
- Mitsuru Karahashi
- Toshiaki Karasawa
- Ryo Kase
- Chiezō Kataoka
- Tsurutaro Kataoka
- Kento Kaku
- Go Kato
- Kazuki Kato
- Keisuke Katō
- Shingo Katori
- Shintaro Katsu
- Ryo Katsuji
- Morio Kazama
- Takuya Kimura
- Yorozuya Kinnosuke
- Renn Kiriyama
- Yūji Kishi
- Shin Kishida
- Eiki Kitamura
- Takumi Kitamura
- Takeshi Kitano
- Taiko Katono
- Akira Kobayashi
- Kaoru Kobayashi
- Keiju Kobayashi
- Kiyoshi Kobayashi
- Masahiro Kobayashi
- Nenji Kobayashi
- Yamato Kochi
- Teppei Koike
- Masahiko Kondō
- Yuta Koseki
- Kane Kosugi
- Yoshikazu Kotani
- Shin Koyamada
- Koyuki
- Kengo Kora
- Yōsuke Kubozuka
- Masataka Kubota
- Yasuaki Kurata

== M ==
- Mackenyu
- Keita Machida
- Gordon Maeda
- Goki Maeda
- Fuyukichi Maki
- Mako (Makoto Iwamatsu)
- Shotaro Mamiya
- Takahisa Masuda
- Kenji Matsuda
- Ryuhei Matsuda
- Shota Matsuda
- Yūsaku Matsuda
- Ken Matsudaira
- Tori Matsuzaka
- Hiroki Matsukata
- Naruki Matsukawa
- Hiroya Matsumoto
- Jun Matsumoto
- Takashi Matsuo
- Yuya Matsushita
- Shinnosuke Mitsushima
- Kenichi Matsuyama
- Takashi Matsuyama
- Toshiro Mifune
- Kensei Mikami
- Kōji Mitsui
- Akifumi Miura
- Haruma Miura
- Tomokazu Miura
- Seiji Miyaguchi
- Yuya Miyashita
- Hiroshi Miyauchi
- Miyavi
- Hio Miyazawa
- Atomu Mizuishi
- Hiro Mizushima
- Ayumu Mochizuki
- Yusaku Mori
- Ryoji Morimoto
- Hisaya Morishige
- Mirai Moriyama
- Masahiro Motoki
- Hiroaki Murakami
- Nijiro Murakami
- Kanako Miyamoto

== N ==
- Masatoshi Nagase
- Akira Nagata
- Kento Nagayama
- Takashi Nagayama
- Tatsuya Nakadai
- Taishi Nakagawa
- Kiichi Nakai
- Masahiro Nakai
- Masaki Nakao
- Taiga Nakano
- Yuto Nakajima
- Yuichi Nakamaru
- Atsuo Nakamura
- Katsuo Nakamura
- Masatoshi Nakamura
- Tomoya Nakamura
- Yūichi Nakamura
- Ichirō Nakatani
- Hiroki Narimiya
- Mikio Narita
- Ryo Narita
- Kazunari Ninomiya
- Toshiyuki Nishida
- Shun Nishime
- Hidetoshi Nishijima
- Ryo Nishikido
- Masahiko Nishimura
- Shunsuke Nishikawa
- Shūhei Nomura

== O ==
- Yūji Oda
- Ryohei Odai
- Joe Odagiri
- Ken Ogata
- Yuuki Ogoe
- Shun Oguri
- Kengo Ohkuchi
- Satoshi Ohno
- Yo Oizumi
- Masi Oka
- Masaki Okada
- Masumi Okada
- Amane Okayama
- Masaya Oki
- Denjirō Ōkōchi
- So Okuno
- Hiroyuki Onoue
- Takao Osawa
- Shugo Oshinari
- Ren Osugi
- Hideji Ōtaki

== R ==
- Abe Ryohei
- Chishū Ryū
- Ryo Ryusei

== S ==
- Kippei Shiina
- Tetsurō Sagawa
- Takumi Saitoh
- Kentaro Sakaguchi
- Tak Sakaguchi
- Masato Sakai
- Sho Sakurai
- Dori Sakurada
- Hiroyuki Sanada
- Hiroyuki Sanada
- Soma Santoki
- Takashi Sasano
- Jiro Sato
- Kōichi Satō
- Yuki Sato
- Takeru Satoh
- Kenta Satoi
- Taichi Saotome
- Kōtarō Satomi
- Tetsu Sawaki
- Ikki Sawamura
- Koreya Senda
- Kōji Seto
- Toshiki Seto
- Jouji Shibue
- Shunya Shiraishi
- Shirō Shimomoto
- Takashi Shimura
- Akihisa Shiono
- Jun Shison
- Yu Shirota
- Joe Shishido
- Takashi Sorimachi
- Masaki Suda
- Kenta Suga
- Takamasa Suga
- Ryōtarō Sugi
- Hiroki Suzuki
- Hiroki Suzuki
- Jin Suzuki
- Yosuke Sugino

== T ==
- Tomorowo Taguchi
- Manpei Takagi
- Shinpei Takagi
- Shinpei Takagi
- Fumiya Takahashi
- Hideki Takahashi
- Ryuki Takahashi
- Yuya Takaki
- Ken Takakura
- Shiho Takano
- Sousuke Takaoka
- Masahiro Takashima
- Masanobu Takashima
- Kaku Takashina
- Mahiro Takasugi
- Kouhei Takeda
- Tetsuya Takeda
- Naoto Takenaka
- Yutaka Takenouchi
- Ryoma Takeuchi
- Hideaki Takizawa
- Hiroshi Tamaki
- Tetsuji Tamayama
- Tetsurō Tamba
- Yoshitaka Tamba
- Masakazu Tamura
- Takahiro Tamura
- Ryō Tamura
- Seiichi Tanabe
- Kei Tanaka
- Koki Tanaka
- Kunie Tanaka
- Min Tanaka
- Minoru Tanaka
- Hayato Tani
- Kei Tani
- Shōsuke Tanihara
- Yuya Tegoshi
- Susumu Terajima
- Hidenori Tokuyama
- Eijirō Tōno
- Etsushi Toyokawa
- Junki Tozuka
- Takayuki Tsubaki
- Kanji Tsuda
- Kenjiro Tsuda
- Keito Tsuna
- Masahiko Tsugawa
- Shinya Tsukamoto
- Masane Tsukayama
- Satoshi Tsumabuki
- Shingo Tsurumi
- Takeshi Tsuruno
- Shinichi Tsutsumi
- Shigeru Tsuyuguchi

== U ==
- Asahi Uchida
- Masato Uchiyama
- Tatsuya Ueda
- Hitoshi Ueki
- Shuhei Uesugi
- Seishū Uragami

== W ==
- Gō Wakabayashi
- Tomisaburo Wakayama
- Ken Watanabe
- Shu Watanabe
- Tetsuya Watari
- Tsunehiko Watase
- Eiji Wentz

== Y ==
- Yūya Yagira
- Kōji Yakusho
- Keaton Yamada
- Takayuki Yamada
- Yūki Yamada
- Kōichi Yamadera
- Shogo Yamaguchi
- Kazuhiro Yamaji
- Koji Yamamoto
- Tarō Yamamoto
- Ryosuke Yamamoto
- Ken Yamamura
- So Yamamura
- Tomohisa Yamashita
- Kento Yamazaki
- Tsutomu Yamazaki
- Kotaro Yanagi
- Tomo Yanagishita
- Norito Yashima
- Ryusei Yokohama
- Ryo Yokoyama
- Kōsuke Yonehara
- Hidetaka Yoshioka
- Ryo Yoshizawa
- Tomohisa Yuge
- Kousei Yuki

== Z ==
- Konparu Zenchiku
- Konparu Zenpō

== See also ==
- List of Japanese actresses
