= List of Kamen Rider Blade characters =

Kamen Rider Blade (仮面ライダー剣(ブレイド), Kamen Raidā Bureido) is a Japanese tokusatsu series that serves as the 14th installment in the Kamen Rider franchise and the fifth entry in the Heisei era.

== Main characters ==
=== Kazuma Kenzaki ===
Kazuma Kenzaki (剣崎 一真, Kenzaki Kazuma) is a kind-hearted BOARD operative who believes in fighting to protect humanity. He was chosen to use the Rider System 02 to seal the Undead as Kamen Rider Blade. While his Rider powers eventually end up turning him into a Joker over the course of the second half of the series, he uses this to force the Battle Fight into a stalemate and allow his friend Hajime to continue living among humans. During the events of Kamen Rider Zi-O, Kenzaki becomes a human again when Amane uses the powers of Another Blade on him. However, during the events of the stage show Kamen Rider Blade 20th Anniversary STAGE&TALK, the Destroyer (破壊者, Hakaisha) turns him into a Joker again.

Utilizing the Change Beetle card in conjunction with the Blay Buckle (ブレイバックル, Burei Bakkuru) belt, Kenzaki can transform into Kamen Rider Blade. While transformed, he wields the Blay Rouzer (ブレイラウザー, Burei Rauzā) sword and carries a deck of spade-themed Rouse Cards that allow him to channel the Category 2–10 Spade Undeads' powers and augment himself with their special abilities. He can also perform Lightning (ライトニング, Raitoningu) finishers via a combination of the Thunder Deer card and up to two other Rouse Cards. His personal vehicle is the Blue Spader (ブルースペイダー, Burū Supeidā) motorcycle, which similar to Blade himself can be augmented with the Category 2–10 Spade Undeads' special abilities via their corresponding Rouse Cards.

Later in the series, Kenzaki acquires the Rouse Absorber (ラウズアブゾーバー, Rauzu Abuzōbā) bracelet, which he can use in conjunction with the Royal Club Undead's cards to assume the following power-up forms:

- Jack Form (ジャックフォーム, Jakku Fōmu): Kenzaki's super form accessed from the Absorb Capricorn and Fusion Eagle cards that fuses him with the Eagle Undead to grant a pair of bird wings. In this form, he wields a blade-extended Empowered Type (強化型, Kyōka-gata) version of the Blay Rouzer, which allows him to perform enhanced versions of his original Lightning finishers with the appropriate Rouse Cards.
- King Form (キングフォーム, Kingu Fōmu): Kenzaki's final form accessed from the Absorb Capricorn and Evolution Caucasus cards that was only intended to fuse him with the Caucasus Undead, but his unusually high fusion rate causes him to instead fuse with all 13 Undead in the Category Spade suit, which ultimately accelerates his transformation into a Joker. In this form, he wields the King Rouzer (キングラウザー, Kingu Rauzā) broadsword, which allows him to perform the Royal Straight Flush (ロイヤルストレートフラッシュ, Roiyaru Sutorēto Furasshu) and Four Card (フォーカード, Fō Kādo) finishers on its own and the Straight Flush (ストレートフラッシュ, Sutorēto Furasshu) finisher with the Blay Rouzer.

During the events of the web series Kamen Sentai Gorider, Kuroto Dan arranges the resurrection of deceased Kamen Riders to lure Emu Hojo into the Game World and kill him. However, Kenzaki arrives to help Emu and the revived Riders stop Kuroto. During the fight, he assumes the form of Aorider (アオライダー, Aoraidā) before the fallen Riders sacrifice themselves to defeat Kuroto and ensure Emu and Kenzaki's escape.

Kazuma Kenzaki is portrayed by Takayuki Tsubaki (椿 隆之, Tsubaki Takayuki).

=== Sakuya Tachibana ===
Sakuya Tachibana (橘 朔也, Tachibana Sakuya) is a BOARD researcher turned field operative who was selected to use the Rider System 01 to seal the Undead as Kamen Rider Garren (仮面ライダーギャレン, Kamen Raidā Gyaren). Unlike Kenzaki, Tachibana fights to seal the Undead to stave off his death from cellular breakdown, which he blames on his superior Karasuma, and displays a rivalry with Kenzaki, who was chosen to provide backup for Tachibana. After learning from a Karasuma body double that his subconscious fears are causing his condition, Tachibana joins forces with Isaka in exchange for Schuld Kestner seaweed to cure himself despite it intensifying his aggression and slowly damaging his nervous system. When Isaka kills his girlfriend, Sayoko Fukasawa, Tachibana overcomes his fear and seals him. Following this, he goes on to take Mutsuki Kamijo under his wing and settle his differences with the Giraffa Undead.

As of the web series Kamen Rider Outsiders, Tachibana has become the president of BOARD.

Utilizing the Change Stag (チェンジスタッグ, Chenji Sutaggu) card in conjunction with the Garren Buckle (ギャレンバックル, Gyaren Bakkuru) belt, Tachibana can transform into Kamen Rider Garren. While transformed, he wields the Garren Rouzer (ギャレンラウザー, Gyaren Rauzā) handgun and carries a deck of diamond-themed Rouse Cards that allow him to channel the Category 2–10 Diamond Undeads' powers and augment himself with their special abilities. He can also perform Burning (バーニング, Bāningu) finishers via a combination of the Fire Fly (ファイアフライ, Faia Furai) card and up to two other Rouse Cards. His personal vehicle is the Red Rhombus (レッドランバス, Reddo Ranbasu) motorcycle, which similar to Garren himself can be augmented with the Category 2–10 Diamond Undeads' special abilities via their corresponding Rouse Cards.

Later in the series, Tachibana acquires his own Rouse Absorber, which he can use in conjunction with the Royal Club Undead's cards to assume the following power-up forms:

- Jack Form: Tachibana's super form accessed from the Absorb Serpent and Fusion Peacock cards that like Kenzaki's version fuses him with the Peacock Undead to grant a pair of bird wings. In this form, he wields a bayonet-equipped Empowered Type version of the Garren Rouzer, which allows him to perform enhanced versions of his original Burning finishers with the appropriate Rouse Cards.
- King Form: Tachibana's final form accessed from the Absorb Serpent and Evolution Giraffa cards that unlike Kenzaki's version works as intended and only fuses him with the Giraffa Undead. As such, it does not carry the risk of transforming into a Joker, though it is still incredibly taxing on his body and can only be used for a short time. In this form, he wields a rifle version of the King Rouzer, which allows him to perform the Four Card. This form appears exclusively in the web series Kamen Rider Outsiders and the stage show Kamen Rider Blade 20th Anniversary STAGE&TALK.

Sakuya Tachibana is portrayed by Kousei Amano (天野 浩成, Amano Kōsei).

=== Hajime Aikawa ===
The Joker (ジョーカー, Jōkā), also known by his human alias of Hajime Aikawa (相川 始, Aikawa Hajime), is a mysterious and infamous longhorn beetle-themed Undead whose victory in the Battle Fight results in the end of all life on Earth. After the Human Undead won the original Battle Fight, he willingly surrendered himself to Joker to help him hide his presence. When the Undead were released two years prior to the series, Joker resealed the Mantis and Human Undead. However, the Royal Club Undead knew of his use of the latter and mounted attempts on Joker's life, with the most recent leading to the death of photographer, Kurihara. Upon learning of the photographer's family, Joker took on the identity of freelance photographer "Hajime Aikawa" and vowed to protect them in atonement. Initially holding a low opinion of humanity, Hajime slowly comes to accept them due to his time with the young Amane Kurihara.

Over the course of the series, Hajime develops rivalries with Kenzaki and Tachibana, though he gradually warms up to them, eventually considering the former a dear friend of his. Once all of the other Undead are sealed, Hajime loses control of his Undead powers until Kenzaki sacrifices his humanity to force the current Battle Fight into a stalemate so Hajime can resume his human life. During the events of Kamen Rider Zi-O, Hajime becomes a true human when Amane uses the powers of Another Blade on him. However, during the events of the stage show Kamen Rider Blade 20th Anniversary STAGE&TALK, the Destroyer turns him back into the Joker.

In an alternate ending depicted in the film Kamen Rider Blade: Missing Ace, Kenzaki seals Hajime, though he eventually frees him four years later to help defeat the Albino Joker. Ultimately, Hajime sacrifices himself to do so, though his spirit continues to watch over Amane.

Unlike the BOARD-sanctioned Kamen Riders, Hajime utilizes one of several Rouse Cards in conjunction with the Chalice Rouzer (カリスラウザー, Karisu Rauzā) belt to transform into any sealed Undead. As such, he can use either the Change Mantis card to transform into the Mantis Undead, which became known as Kamen Rider Chalice (仮面ライダーカリス, Kamen Raidā Karisu) due to its strong resemblance to the Riders, or the Spirit card to transform into the Human Undead, which became his human form. As Kamen Rider Chalice, he wields the bladed Chalice Arrow (カリスアロー, Karisu Arō) bow, which can be reconfigured from Blade Mode (ブレードモード, Burēdo Mōdo) to Rousing Bow Mode (醒弓モード, Seikyū Mōdo) by combining with the Chalice Rouzer's Rouzer Unit (ラウザーユニット, Rauzā Yunitto) belt buckle, and carries a deck of heart-themed Rouse Cards that allow him to channel the Category 2–10 Heart Undeads' powers and augment himself with their special abilities. He can also perform Spinning (スピニング, Supiningu) finishers via a combination of the Tornado Hawk (トルネード・ホーク, Torunēdo Hōku) card and up to two other Rouse Cards. His personal vehicle is the Shadow Chaser (シャドーチェイサー, Shadō Cheisā) motorcycle, which similar to Chalice himself can be augmented with the Category 2–10 Heart Undeads' special abilities via their corresponding Rouse Cards.

Using the Evolution Paradoxa card, Hajime can fuse himself with all 13 Undead in the Category Heart suit to transform into his final form; Kamen Rider Wild Chalice (仮面ライダーワイルドカリス, Kamen Raidā Wairudo Karisu). While transformed, he wields the Wild Slasher (ワイルドスラッシャー, Wairudo Surasshā) kama, which can be reconfigured from its two-piece Rousing Sickle Mode (醒鎌モード, Seiren Mōdo) to its one-piece Rousing Bow Mode by combining with the Chalice Arrow where it allows him to perform the Wild Cyclone (ワイルドサイクロン, Wairudo Saikuron) finisher via a fusion of his Rouse Cards called the Wild (ワイルド, Wairudo) card.

Hajime Aikawa is portrayed by Ryoji Morimoto (森本 亮治, Morimoto Ryōji).

=== Mutsuki Kamijo ===
Mutsuki Kamijo (上城 睦月, Kamijō Mutsuki) is a weak-willed high school student who was chosen by the improperly sealed Spider Undead to reluctantly utilize the Rider System 03 and become Kamen Rider Leangle (仮面ライダーレンゲル, Kamen Raidā Rengeru). While under the monster's control, he battles the other Kamen Riders until the sealed Tiger and Tarantula Undead give him the strength to fight under his own power, overcome the Spider Undead, and seal it properly. Soon after, Mutsuki joins the other Riders in their fight against the remaining Undead.

Utilizing the Change Spider card in conjunction with the Leangle Buckle (レンゲルバックル, Rengeru Bakkuru) belt, Mutsuki can transform into Kamen Rider Leangle. While transformed, he wields the extendable Leangle Rouzer (レンゲルラウザー, Rengeru Rauzā) staff and carries a deck of club-themed Rouse Cards that allow him to channel the Category 2–10 Club Undeads' powers and augment himself with their special abilities. He can also perform Blizzard (ブリザード, Burizādo) finishers via a combination of the Blizzard Polar (ブリザード・ポーラー, Burizādo Pōrā) card and up to two other Rouse Cards. His personal vehicle is the Green Clover (グリンクローバー, Gurin Kurōbā) motorcycle, which similar to Leangle himself can be augmented with the Category 2–10 Club Undeads' special abilities via their corresponding Rouse Cards.

During the events of the stage show Kamen Rider Blade 20th Anniversary STAGE&TALK, Mutsuki acquires his own Rouse Absorber, which he can use in conjunction with the Absorb Tiger and Evolution Tarantula cards to assume his King Form. Like Tachibana's version, Mutsuki's does not carry the risk of transforming into a Joker, as it only fuses him with the Tarantula Undead, but it is highly taxing on his body. In this form, he wields a spear version of the King Rouzer, which allows him to perform the Royal Straight Flush.

Mutsuki Kamijo is portrayed by Takahiro Hōjō (北条 隆博, Hōjō Takahiro).

=== Shiori Hirose ===
Shiori Hirose (広瀬 栞, Hirose Shiori) is a member of BOARD and a survivor of the Undead's initial release who assists the BOARD Riders in detecting Undead.

Shiori Hirose is portrayed by Yumi Egawa (江川 有未, Egawa Yumi).

=== Kotaro Shirai ===
Kotaro Shirai (白井 虎太郎, Shirai Kotarō) is an aspiring writer and milk addict who provides housing for Kenzaki and Shiori.

Kotaro Shirai is portrayed by Terunosuke Takezai (竹財 輝之助, Takezai Terunosuke).

== Recurring characters ==
=== Undead ===
The Undead (アンデッド, Andeddo) are 54 immortal animal/plant-themed monsters who originated several species that inhabit Earth and were created by the Monolith (モノリス, Monorisu) 10,000 years ago to determine which of their descendants would become the dominant species as part of a battle royal called the Battle Fight (バトルファイト, Batoru Faito). While the Human Undead won, allowing humanity to flourish, and the majority were sealed by the Monolith into Rouse Cards (ラウズカード, Rauzu Kādo) upon their defeat, the Undead were released two years prior to the series by Yoshito Hirose, which Hiroshi Tennoji took advantage of to stage his own Battle Fight and steal the Monolith, intending to use both for his own ends.

The Undead are categorized based on card suits, with the Royal Club Undead (上級アンデッド, Jōkyū Andeddo) being the most powerful. The Category Jack (ジャック, Jakku), Queen (クイーン, Kuīn), and King (キング, Kingu) Undead are all capable of disguising themselves as humans and possess higher forms of thought compared to their weaker feral brethren. Additionally, despite possessing an equivalent amount of power as the other Royal Club Undead and being among their kind's greatest warriors, the Category Ace (エース, Ēsu) Undead lack the ability to shapeshift.

==== Isaka ====
The Category Jack of Diamonds: Peacock Undead (ピーコックアンデッド, Pīkokku Andeddo), also known by his human alias of Isaka (伊坂), is the creator of the Rider System 03. He assists the Spider Undead in finding an ideal host for him and deceives Kamen Rider Garren into working for him. After he kills Garren's girlfriend, Sayako Fukasawa, for interfering with his plans, Isaka is sealed into the Fusion Peacock (フュージョンピーコック, Fyūjon Pīkokku) card by Garren.

In his human form, Isaka possesses telekinesis, the ability to create fireballs, and mass hypnosis.

Isaka is portrayed by Yasukaze Motomiya (本宮 泰風, Motomiya Yasukaze).

==== Spider Undead ====
The Category Ace of Clubs: Spider Undead (スパイダーアンデッド, Supaidā Andeddo) is Isaka's accomplice who can produce webbing from his mouth capable of siphoning victims' life forces. Initially working to find ideal hosts for Rider System 03, the Spider Undead eventually allows itself to be partially sealed into the Change Spider (チェンジスパイダー, Chenji Supaidā) card by Kamen Rider Garren so it can possess Mutsuki Kamijo in the hopes of winning the modern Battle Fight. However, Kamijo receives help from the Tarantula and Tiger Undead in overcoming the Spider Undead's influence and properly sealing it.

The Spider Undead is voiced by Katsumi Shiono (塩野 勝美, Shiono Katsumi) in episodes 11-14 and Missing Ace while Kiyoyuki Yanada (梁田 清之, Yanada Kiyoyuki) took over the role in episodes 17-42.

==== Miyuki Yoshinaga ====
The Category Queen of Hearts: Orchid Undead (オーキッドアンデッド, Ōkiddo Andeddo), also known by her human alias of Miyuki Yoshinaga (吉永 みゆき, Yoshinaga Miyuki), is a manipulative individual who becomes the target of Kotaro Shirai's affections. Unable to cope with human emotions, she battles and is sealed into the Absorb Orchid by Kamen Rider Leangle.

Miyuki Yoshinaga is portrayed by Mika Hijii (肘井 美佳, Hijii Mika).

==== Kanai ====
The Category King of Diamonds: Giraffa Undead (ギラファアンデッド, Girafa Andeddo), also known by his human alias of Kanai (金居), is a stoic individual and the first to learn that the modern Battle Fight is being fought under false pretenses. He manipulates the Riders into weakening Hiroshi Tennoji before killing him himself and stealing the Kerberos card to gain the power necessary to seal the Joker. After blackmailing Hajime Aikawa into fighting him, Kanai battles Kamen Rider Garren, who eventually seals him into the Evolution Giraffa (エボリューションギラファ, Eboryūshon Girafa) card.

Kanai is portrayed by Akira Kubodera (窪寺 昭, Kubodera Akira).

==== Minor Undead ====
- Bat Undead (バットアンデッド, Batto Andeddo): The Category Eight of Diamonds Undead who can control its namesake, but is vulnerable to sunlight. It is sealed into the Scope Bat (スコープ・バット, Sukōpu Batto) card by Kamen Rider Garren. The Bat Undead is voiced by Tōru Ōmura (大村 亨, Ōmura Tōru)
- Locust Undead (ローカストアンデッド, Rōkasuto Andeddo): The Category Five of Spades Undead who possesses superhuman jumping and the ability to separate into a swarm of its namesake. It attacks BOARD, killing several of their employees, before it is sealed into the Kick Locust (キック・ローカスト, Kikku Rōkasuto) card by Kamen Rider Blade.
- Plant Undead (プラントアンデッド, Puranto Andeddo): The Category Seven of Hearts Undead who possesses telepathy and vine-like fingers on its right hand. It strangles people at an observatory before challenging Kamen Rider Chalice, who seals the monster into the Bio Plant (バイオ・プラント, Baio Puranto) card.
- Deer Undead (ディアーアンデッド, Diā Andeddo): The Category Six of Spades Undead who possesses electrokinesis. It is sealed into the Thunder Deer (サンダー・ディアー, Sandā Diā) card by Kamen Rider Blade.
- Moth Undead (モスアンデッド, Mosu Andeddo): The Category Eight of Hearts Undead who possesses flammable powder that is fatal to humans. It is sealed into the Reflect Moth (リフレクト・モス, Rifurekuto Mosu) card by Kamen Rider Chalice.
- Centipede Undead (センチピードアンデッド, Senchipīdo Andeddo): The Category Ten of Hearts Undead who possesses fear-inducing poison and the corresponding antidote. It is sealed into the Shuffle Centipede (シャッフル・センチピード, Shaffuru Senchipīdo) card by Kamen Rider Chalice.
- Trilobite Undead (トリロバイトアンデッド, Torirobaito Andeddo): The Category Seven of Spades Undead who possesses armor-like skin. Isaka forces it to help him acquire data on Kamen Riders Blade, Garren, and Chalice so he can create Rider System 03 until the monster is sealed into the Metal Trilobite (メタル・トリロバイト, Metaru Torirobaito) card by Kamen Rider Blade.
- Zebra Undead (ゼブラアンデッド, Zebura Andeddo): The Category Nine of Diamonds Undead who can produce clones of itself. It attacks people at a mall until Isaka forces it to test Kamen Rider Garren, who seals the monster into the Gemini Zebra (ジェミニ・ゼブラ, Jemini Zebura) card.
- Jaguar Undead (ジャガーアンデッド, Jagā Andeddo): The Category Nine of Spades Undead who possesses superhuman speed. It attacks people indiscriminately until it is intimidated by the Spider Undead into attacking Sayako Fukasawa, during which Kamen Rider Blade seals the monster into the Mach Jaguar (マッハ・ジャガー (Mahha Jagā) card.
- Shell Undead (シェルアンデッド, Sheru Andeddo): The Category Five of Hearts Undead who possesses a drill-like spiral shell for a right arm. It attacks Kamen Rider Chalice, who seals the monster into the Drill Shell (ドリル・シェル, Doriru Sheru) card.
- Lion Undead (ライオンアンデッド, Raion Andeddo): The Category Three of Spades Undead. Isaka recruits it to kidnap candidates that the Spider Undead identified for Rider System 03's potential use. While kidnapping Mutsuki Kamijo, the Lion Undead is sealed into the Beat Lion (ビート・ライオン, Bīto Raion) card by Kamen Rider Blade.
- Dragonfly Undead (ドラゴンフライアンデッド, Doragonfurai Andeddo): The Category Four of Hearts Undead who possesses the ability to fly and summon more of its namesake. It abducts Amane and Haruka Kurihara to lure Kamen Rider Chalice into a fight, but is eventually sealed into the Float Dragonfly (フロート・ドラゴンフライ, Furōto Doragonfurai) card by the latter.
- Boar Undead (ボアアンデッド, Boa Andeddo): The Category Four of Spades Undead who was sealed into the Tackle Boar (タックル・ボア, Takkuru Boa) card for Kamen Rider Blade's use.
- Yazawa (矢沢): The Category Queen of Spades: Capricorn Undead (カプリコーンアンデッド, Kapurikōn Andeddo) who possesses a high-pitched scream. He joins forces with Miyuki Yoshinaga to steal the Blay Buckle, but is interrupted by Kamen Rider Chalice and sealed into the Absorb Capricorn (アブゾーブカプリコーン, Abuzōbu Kapurikōn) card by Kamen Rider Blade. Yazawa is portrayed by Atsushi Korechika (是近 敦之, Korechika Atsushi).
- Mole Undead (モールアンデッド, Mōru Andeddo): The Category Three of Clubs Undead. It is sealed into the Screw Mole (スクリュー・モール, Sukuryū Mōru) card by Kamen Rider Blade.
- Takahara (高原): The Category Jack of Spades: Eagle Undead (イーグルアンデッド, Īguru Andeddo) and an ally of the Mantis Undead who can summon feather-like throwing knives. He seeks to avenge the Mantis Undead, only to be sealed into the Fusion Eagle (フュージョンイーグル, Fyūjon īguru) card by Kamen Rider Blade. Takahara is portrayed by Yasufumi Hayashi (林 泰文, Hayashi Yasufumi).
- Shinmei (新名): The Category Jack of Hearts: Wolf Undead (ウルフアンデッド, Urufu Andeddo) who was sealed into the Fusion Wolf (フュージョン・ウルフ, Fyūjon Urufu) card. His personal vehicle is the Black Fang (ブラックファング, Burakku Fangu) motorcycle, which he stole from BOARD. Shinmei is portrayed by Masashi Kagami (加々美 正史, Kagami Masashi).
- Daichi (大地): The Category Jack of Clubs: Elephant Undead (エレファントアンデッド, Erefanto Andeddo) who possesses incredible physical strength and prefers to wait out the Battle Fight, preferably while sunbathing, until he can defeat the winner as he believes that fighting is pointless unless he knows his opponent's limits. He is sealed into the Fusion Elephant (フュージョン・エレファント, Fyūjon Erefanto) card by Kamen Rider Blade. Daichi is portrayed by Kairi Narita (成田 浬, Narita Kairi).
- Noboru Shima (嶋 昇, Shima Noboru): The kind-hearted Category King of Clubs: Tarantula Undead (タランチュラアンデッド, Taranchura Andeddo). He allows himself to be sealed into the Evolution Tarantula (エボリューションタランチュラ, Eboryūshon Taranchura) card by Kamen Rider Leangle to help him overcome the Spider Undead's influence. Noboru Shima is portrayed by Kazunari Aizawa (相澤 一成, Aizawa Kazunari).
- Buffalo Undead (バッファローアンデッド, Baffarō Andeddo): The Category Eight of Spades Undead who possesses magnokinesis. It is sealed into the Magnet Buffalo (マグネット・バッファロー, Magunetto Baffarō) card by Kamen Rider Blade.
- Pecker Undead (ペッカーアンデッド, Pekkā Andeddo): The Category Four of Diamonds Undead. It is sealed into the Rapid Pecker (ラピッド・ペッカー, Rapiddo Pekkā) card by Kamen Rider Garren.
- Azumi (あずみ): The psychotic Category Queen of Diamonds: Serpent Undead (サーペントアンデッド, Sāpento Andeddo) who can change her hair into whip-like snakes. She attempts to eliminate the Joker, only to be sealed into the Absorb Serpent (アブゾーブサーペント, Abuzōbu Sāpento) card by Kamen Rider Chalice. Azumi is portrayed by Mio Fukuzumi (福澄 美緒, Fukuzumi Mio).
- Tortoise Undead (トータスアンデッド, Tōtasu Andeddo): The Category Seven of Diamonds Undead who serves as Azumi's bodyguard before it is sealed into the Rock Tortoise (ロック・トータス, Rokku Tōtasu) card by Kamen Rider Garren.
- King: The trouble-making Category King of Spades: Caucasus Undead (コーカサスアンデッド, Kōkasasu Andeddo) who possesses telekinesis and can raise a shield by clapping his hands. He steals Kamen Rider Chalice's Rouse Cards to make him revert to his monstrous form, only to be eventually sealed into the Evolution Caucasus (エボリューションコーカサス, Eboryūshon Kōkasasu) card by Kamen Rider Blade. King is portrayed by Makoto Kamijo (上條 誠, Kamijō Makoto).
- Scarab Undead (スカラベアンデッド, Sukarabe Andeddo): The Category Ten of Spades Undead who serves as King's subordinate and possesses chronokinesis, though personal items are unaffected. It is sealed into the Time Scarab (タイム・スカラベ, Taimu Sukarabe) card by Kamen Rider Blade.
- Human Undead (ヒューマンアンデッド, Hyūman Andeddo): The Category Two of Hearts Undead and winner of the previous Battle Fight who possesses telepathy. After being unsealed prior to the series, the Human Undead allowed Hajime to reseal him back into the Spirit (スピリット, Supiritto) card to help the latter maintain his disguise. The Human Undead is portrayed by Ryoji Morimoto.
- Mantis Undead (マンティスアンデッド, Mantisu Andeddo): The Category Ace of Hearts Undead who is reputed to be the best fighter among their kind. The Mantis Undead was sealed into the Change Mantis (チェンジマンティス, Chenji Mantisu) card by Hajime Aikawa sometime prior to the series.
- Jellyfish Undead (ジェリーフィッシュアンデッド, Jerīfisshu Andeddo): The Category Seven of Clubs Undead who possesses self-liquefaction capabilities and electrokinesis. It is sealed into the Gel Jellyfish (ゲル・ジェリーフィッシュ, Geru Jerīfisshu) card by Kamen Rider Leangle via Kamen Rider Chalice's Rouse Cards.
- Hikaru Jō (城 光, Jō Hikaru): The prideful yet dignified Category Queen of Clubs: Tiger Undead (タイガーアンデッド, Taigā Andeddo) who possesses superhuman strength and speed. Upon learning that the present day Battle Fight is being held under false pretenses, she infiltrates BOARD, only to learn of Hiroshi Tennoji's intentions. She subsequently and intentionally seals herself into the Absorb Tiger (アブゾーブタイガー, Abuzōbu Taigā) card while fighting Kamen Rider Leangle before later helping him overcome the Spider Undead's influence. Hikaru Jō is portrayed by Akane Hamasaki (浜崎 茜, Hamasaki Akane).
- Lizard Undead (リザードアンデッド, Rizādo Andeddo): The Category Two of Spades Undead who was sealed into the Slash Lizard (スラッシュ・リザード, Surasshu Rizādo) card for Kamen Rider Blade's use sometime prior to the series.
- Squid Undead (スキッドアンデッド, Sukiddo Andeddo): The Category Nine of Clubs Undead who possesses tentacles and superhuman speed. It was sealed in the Smog Squid (スモッグ・スキッド, Sumoggu Sukiddo) card for Kamen Rider Leangle's use sometime prior to the series.

==== Other Undead ====
- Trial (トライアル, Toraiaru): A series of artificial Undead created by BOARD using technology and human DNA to interfere with the Battle Fight. They lack the immortality of regular Undead.
  - Trial B (トライアルB, Toraiaru Bī): A Trial Undead who was infused with the DNA of Yoshito, who copied his memories into the monster while programing him to protect Shiori. Though Trial B is reprogrammed by Tennoji to serve him and remove potential threats, Trial B remembers its base programming and sacrifices itself to save Shiori from Trial G.
  - Trial D (トライアルD, Toraiaru Dī): A Trial Undead tasked with killing Kenzaki before he can attain his King Form, only to be destroyed by the latter.
  - Trial E (トライアルE, Toraiaru Ī): A Trial Undead created from Tachibana's DNA and imprinted with his combat data as Garren. It is destroyed by Kamen Rider Blade. In the DVD special Hyper Battle Video Blade vs. Blade, another Trial E disguises himself as Kenzaki wearing a red scarf. Mimicking the Blay Buckle to transform further into Imitation Blade (偽ブレイド, Nise Bureido), the second Trial E fights the real Kamen Rider Blade until Hajime Aikawa exposes him and Blade eventually destroys him with help from Kamen Riders Garren and Leangle.
  - Trial F (トライアルF, Toraiaru Efu): A Trial Undead created from the DNA of the Paradoxa Undead to capture Kenzaki, only to be destroyed by Kamen Rider Wild Chalice.
  - Trial G (トライアルG, Toraiaru Jī): A Trial Undead imprinted with Kamen Rider Leangle's combat data. It is destroyed by Kamen Riders Wild Chalice and Blade.
- Titan (ティターン, Titān): An artificial Undead who Tennoji created by merging the Scorpion and Chameleon Undead's Rouse Cards into one body with access to the former's poison and the latter's cloaking capabilities. It is deployed to turn the Kamen Riders on each other before they trick the Undead into revealing itself and reseal its components. Titan is voiced simultaneously by Katsumi Shiono and Chika Kobayashi (小林 知佳, Kobayashi Chika).
- Kerberos (ケルベロス, Keruberosu): An uncontrollable artificial Undead who Tennoji made from the DNA of all 53 Undead to surpass the Joker's power with the intention of winning the modern Battle Fight on his behalf. However, it slaughters his staff upon its creation. After Kerberos is defeated by Kamen Rider Blade, Tennoji fuses with it to become Kerberos II. Kerberos is voiced by Katsumi Shiono.
- Darkroaches (ダークローチ, Dākurōchi): Cockroach-themed Undead grunts that serve as extensions of the Monolith, manifest whenever a single Joker wins the Battle Fight, and can re-manifest from the Monolith after being destroyed whose sole purpose is to wipe out all life on Earth.
- Beetle Undead (ビートルアンデッド, Bītoru Andeddo): The Category Ace of Spades Undead who was sealed into the Change Beetle (チェンジビートル, Chenji Bītoru) card for Kamen Rider Blade's use. The Beetle Undead appears exclusively in the film Kamen Rider Blade: Missing Ace.
- Kamata (鎌田): The Category King of Hearts: Paradoxa Undead (パラドキサアンデッド, Paradokisa Andeddo) who was sealed into the Evolution Paradoxa (エボリューションパラドキサ, Eboryūshon Paradokisa) card sometime prior to the series. The Paradoxa Undead appears exclusively in the succeeding series Kamen Rider Decade.

=== BOARD ===
The Board of Archaeological Research Department (人類基盤史研究所, Jinrui Kibanshi Kenkyūjo), abbreviated as BOARD (ボード, Bōdo), is an organization dedicated to combating and sealing the Undead via Rider Systems (ライダーシステム, Raidā Shisutemu) capable of fusing humans with Undead DNA.

==== Kei Karasuma ====
Kei Karasuma (烏丸 啓, Karasuma Kei) is the president of BOARD and a professor who created Kamen Riders Blade, Garren, and Leangle's Rider Systems while under Isaka's control. During his travels, he befriended Noboru Shima, whom he entrusted with the Rouse Absorbers despite knowing he was an Undead.

Kei Karasuma is portrayed by Kazuhiro Yamaji (山路 和弘, Yamaji Kazuhiro).

==== Yoshito Hirose ====
Yoshito Hirose (広瀬 義人, Hirose Yoshito) is Shiori's father who released the Undead in a fit of madness, dying in the process. Prior to this, the former created Undead Trial B in his image to protect Shiori and gave it all of his memories up to that point.

Yoshito Hirose is portrayed by Junichi Haruta (春田 純一, Haruta Jun'ichi).

==== Hiroshi Tennoji ====
Hiroshi Tennoji (天王路 博史, Ten'nōji Hiroshi) is the chairman of BOARD who manipulated the series' events and the creation of the artificial Undead Kerberos to realize his dream of a new world order with himself as its ruler. Despite merging himself with Kerberos, he is defeated by the Kamen Riders and killed by the Giraffa Undead.

Hiroshi Tennoji is portrayed by Kohji Moritsugu (森次 晃嗣, Moritsugu Kōji).

=== Nozomi Yamanaka ===
Nozomi Yamanaka (山中 望美, Yamanaka Nozomi) is Mutsuki's girlfriend who became indirectly involved with and supports his journey as a Kamen Rider.

Nozomi Yamanaka is portrayed by Arisa Miyazawa (宮澤 亜理沙, Miyazawa Arisa).

=== Haruka Kurihara ===
Haruka Kurihara (栗原 遥香, Kurihara Haruka) is Kotaro's older sister and owner of the Jacaranda Cafe.

Haruka Kurihara is portrayed by Kaori Yamaguchi (山口 香緒里, Yamaguchi Kaori).

=== Amane Kurihara ===
Amane Kurihara (栗原 天音, Kurihara Amane) is Haruka's rude nine-year-old daughter and Kotaro's niece who develops feelings for Hajime, which contributes to his changing attitude towards humanity.

Amane Kurihara is portrayed by Hikari Kajiwara (梶原 ひかり, Kajiwara Hikari) as a child and by Miku Ishida (石田 未来, Ishida Miku) as a teenager.

== Guest characters ==
- Sayoko Fukasawa (深沢 小夜子, Fukasawa Sayoko): Tachibana's college girlfriend and nurse who is killed by the Peacock Undead for interfering with his plans. Sayoko Fukasawa is portrayed by Urara Awata (粟田 麗, Awata Urara).
- Go Kiryu (桐生 豪, Kiryū Gō): A former member of BOARD who was originally meant to be the first user of the Garren system, but was deemed incompatible. Due to his warped sense of justice, he uses his prosthetic hand to electrocute petty crooks until he gains ahold of the imperfect Leangle System and joins forces with the Spider Undead. After being defeated, the latter abandons Kiryu and orders the Locust, Deer, and Jaguar Undead to kill him. Go Kiryu is portrayed by Nozomu Masuzawa (増沢 望, Masuzawa Nozomu).
- Tatsuya Yamaguchi (山口 辰也, Yamaguchi Tatsuya): A motorcycle racer who aids the Riders in stopping the Wolf Undead. Tatsuya Yamaguchi is portrayed by himself.
- Ryo Mikami (三上 了, Mikami Ryō): An Iroha clan takoyaki maker who resembles Hajime and is in the midst of a forbidden romance with Michi of the Irohas' rivals, the Hoheta clan. Fed up with his life, he swaps identities with an amnesiac Hajime. However, he later returns to reclaim his place via a Hoheta clan training suit and becomes Taiyaki Master Ultimate Form before aiding Hajime in fighting the Serpent Undead and marrying Michi. Ryo Mikami is portrayed by Ryoji Morimoto, who also portrays Hajime Aikawa.
- Michi (未知): A Hoheta clan takoyaki maker and Ryo's supportive girlfriend who later contributes to reconciling her clan's differences with the Iroha clan and marries Ryo. Michi is portrayed by Michie Kitaura (北浦 実千枝, Kitaura Michie).

== Spin-off exclusive characters ==
=== Junichi Shimura ===
The Albino Joker (アルビノジョーカー, Arubino Jōkā), also known by his human alias of Junichi Shimura (志村 純一, Shimura Jun'ichi), is a secondary Joker who appears exclusively in an alternate ending depicted in the film Kamen Rider Blade: Missing Ace. Following Hajime Aikawa's sealing, Shimura emerged to attack Karasuma and release the other Undead once more. Taking on a human form, the former joins BOARD to reseal the Undead, becoming Kamen Rider Glaive (仮面ライダーグレイブ, Kamen Raidā Gureibu) and recruiting Natsumi Miwa and Shin Magaki to help him in the process. Once the job is complete, Shimura kills his partners, but is eventually exposed by Shiori Hirose. Mutsuki Kamijo unseals Hajime to help the Riders, but Shimura uses the Category King Undeads' Rouse Cards to create the Vanity (バニティ, Baniti) card, seals Amane Kurihara in it, and uses them to summon the monstrous Jashin 14 (邪神14, Jashin Fōtīn) and fuse with it to gain its power. Using his new form, he tries to kill the Riders, but Hajime sacrifices himself to help Kenzaki destroy the Vanity card, freeing Amane and weakening Shimura enough for Kenzaki to kill him.

Utilizing the Change Kerberos (チェンジケルベロス, Chenji Keruberosu) card in conjunction with the Glaive Buckle (グレイブバックル, Gureibu Bakkuru) belt, Shimura can transform into Kamen Rider Glaive. While transformed, he wields the Glaive Rouzer (グレイブラウザー, Gureibu Rauzā) sword, which allows him to perform the Gravity Slash (グラビティスラッシュ, Gurabiti Surasshu) finisher via the Mighty Gravity (マイティ・グラビティ, Maiti Gurabiti) card.

As the Albino Joker, Shimura can summon white-colored versions of the Darkroaches called Albiroaches (アルビローチ, Arubirōchi) to aid him.

Junichi Shimura is portrayed by Yuuki Kuroda (黒田 勇樹, Kuroda Yūki).

=== Natsumi Miwa ===
Natsumi Miwa (三輪 夏美, Miwa Natsumi) is a former officer worker turned BOARD member who appears exclusively in the film Kamen Rider Blade: Missing Ace. At her former job, she was berated by her boss until she had enough and knocked him out. Following this, she was handpicked by Junichi Shimura to join him at BOARD as Kamen Rider Larc (仮面ライダーラルク, Kamen Raidā Raruku) to capture the Undead released by the Albino Joker. She is later killed by Shimura after discovering he was the Albino Joker.

Utilizing her own copy of Shimura's Change Kerberos card in conjunction with the Larc Buckle (ラルクバックル, Raruku Bakkuru) belt, Miwa can transform into Kamen Rider Larc. While transformed, she wields the Larc Rouzer (ラルクラウザー, Raruku Rauzā) crossbow, which allows her to perform the Ray Bullet (レイバレット, Rei Baretto) finisher via the Mighty Ray (マイティ・レイ, Maiti Rei) card.

Natsumi Miwa is portrayed by Yoko Mitsuya (三津谷 葉子, Mitsuya Yoko).

=== Shin Magaki ===
Shin Magaki (禍木 慎, Magaki Shin) is a former waiter turned BOARD member who appears exclusively in the film Kamen Rider Blade: Missing Ace. After being fired from his previous job for yelling at a rude customer, he was handpicked by Junichi Shimura to join him at BOARD as Kamen Rider Lance (仮面ライダーランス, Kamen Raidā Ransu) to capture the Undead released by the Albino Joker. While Magaki is later killed by Shimura, having discovered the latter was the Albino Joker, he is able to provide clues to the other Riders pointing to Shimura's true identity.

Utilizing his own copy of Shimura's Change Kerberos card in conjunction with the Lance Buckle (ランスバックル, Ransu Bakkuru) belt, Magaki can transform into Kamen Rider Lance. While transformed, he wields the Lance Rouzer (ランスラウザー, Ransu Rauzā) spear, which allows him to perform the Impact Stab (インパクトスタッブ, Inpakuto Sutabbu) finisher via the Mighty Impact (マイティ・インパクト, Maiti Inpakuto) card.

Shin Magaki is portrayed by Takao Sugiura (杉浦 太雄, Sugiura Takao).
