= Kamen Rider: Battride War =

- Genres: Action role-playing game, hack and slash
- Developers: Eighting; Bandai Namco Studios
- Publisher: Bandai Namco Games
- Platforms: PlayStation 3, PlayStation 4, PlayStation Vita, Wii U
- First release: Kamen Rider: Battride War; May 23, 2013
- Latest release: Kamen Rider: Battride War Genesis; February 25, 2016

Kamen Rider: Battride War (Japanese: 仮面ライダー バトライド・ウォー, Hepburn: Kamen Raidā Batoraido Wō) is a spinoff video game series of the Kamen Rider Series.

== Games ==
=== Kamen Rider: Battride War ===
Kamen Rider: Battride War
- Packaging artwork for the standard edition
- Developers: Eighting; Namco Bandai Studios
- Publisher: Namco Bandai Games
- Series: Kamen Rider
- Platform: PlayStation 3
- Release: JP: May 23, 2013
- Genres: Action role-playing game, Hack and slash
- Modes: Single-player, multiplayer

Kamen Rider: Battride War (仮面ライダー バトライド・ウォー, Kamen Raidā Batoraido Wō) is a video game based on the Kamen Rider Series, released for the PlayStation 3 on May 23, 2013. Done in the style of Dynasty Warriors, the player controls one of the Kamen Riders as he battles through a series of enemies. The game mainly features the protagonists of the Heisei era of Kamen Rider, starting with 2000's Kamen Rider Kuuga and featuring up to 2013's Kamen Rider Wizard. Showa-era Kamen Riders were originally meant to be released as downloadable content, but only two alternate versions of characters were released instead. A limited edition of the game was released that has a soundtrack that includes the original theme songs from the TV series and films.

The game's story mode known as "Chronicle Mode" ultimately pits the Kamen Riders against their mortal enemies in a final showdown. In this game, many Heisei Riders had their memories sealed and altered by a former member of Foundation X, Callas (voiced by Hōchū Ōtsuka). Only Wizard who manage to survive the seal and alteration thanks to an entity known as Canaria (voiced by Miyuki Sawashiro, who also voiced Kiva-la). It is up to Wizard to break free and restore the Heisei Riders' memories.

The game's theme song is "Go get 'em" by the Kamen Rider Girls. The physical release of the single included a DLC code to access the Kamen Rider Wizard's All Dragon Figure in game.

=== Kamen Rider: Battride War II ===
Kamen Rider: Battride War II
- Packaging artwork for the standard edition
- Developers: Eighting; Bandai Namco Studios
- Publisher: Bandai Namco Games
- Series: Kamen Rider
- Platforms: PlayStation 3, Wii U
- Release: JP: June 26, 2014
- Genres: Action role-playing game, Hack and slash
- Modes: Single-player, multiplayer

Kamen Rider: Battride War II (仮面ライダー バトライド・ウォー II, Kamen Raidā Batoraido Wō II) was released on June 26, 2014, and it features characters from the most recent TV series Kamen Rider Gaim as well as story scenarios based on the various Kamen Rider films, including the Movie Wars series. As with the original game, a limited-edition version with the theme songs from the TV series and films was also released. The game was announced on February 6, 2014 in the Dengeki PlayStation magazine. In addition to the PlayStation 3, Battride War II was released on the Wii U. Kamen Rider Girls performed the game's theme song "Break the shell".

The story sees the Kamen Riders helping brother and sister Reito (レイト; voiced by Aoi Yuki (Younger version)) and Reina (レイナ; voiced by Rie Tanaka) to restore Reito's memories by reliving the events of the Kamen Riders' various movies. The two siblings are assisted by Cinema (シネマ, Shinema; voiced by Keiji Fujiwara), who is ultimately revealed to be the game's main antagonist who is more interested in filming the Kamen Riders for an unknown purpose.

Many original cast members return for this game, including several new characters. Mitsuru Matsuoka of SOPHIA reprises his role as voice Kamen Rider Eternal, Musashi returns to voice Kamen Rider Caucasus, and Hiroyuki Watanabe returns to voice Kamen Rider Gaoh. Ken Matsudaira, who portrayed the historical figure Tokugawa Yoshimune in the film Kamen Rider OOO Wonderful: The Shogun and the 21 Core Medals, appears in the game as a new playable character. Kento Handa, who portrayed Takumi Inui in Kamen Rider 555, reprises his role for this game, having not appeared in the prior version.

Players have the option of setting up custom song playlists for the game's various characters. They can pick songs from their own PlayStation 3 and Wii U libraries or they can pick and choose songs from the game if they have bought the Premium TV & Movie Sound Edition.

A series of downloadable content campaigns were run for the game, featuring various new characters introduced during the broadcast of Kamen Rider Gaim, such as Kamen Rider Zangetsu Shin and Kamen Rider Gaim Kiwami Arms.

=== Kamen Rider: Battride War Genesis ===
Kamen Rider: Battride War Genesis
- Developers: Eighting; Bandai Namco Studios
- Publisher: Bandai Namco Entertainment
- Series: Kamen Rider
- Platforms: PlayStation 3, PlayStation 4, PlayStation Vita/PlayStation TV
- Release: JP: February 25, 2016
- Genres: Action role-playing game, Hack and slash
- Modes: Single-player, multiplayer

The third title called Kamen Rider: Battride War Genesis (仮面ライダー バトライド・ウォー 創生, Kamen Raidā Batoraido Wō Sōsei) was announced in September 2015 to be released on February 25, 2016 for the PlayStation 4, PlayStation 3 and PlayStation Vita. It is part of the anniversary project to celebrate the Kamen Rider franchise's 45th anniversary, and will feature characters from both all Showa Rider TV series, Kamen Rider Drive and Kamen Rider Ghost after a year of hiatus during Kamen Rider Drive's airing, as well as feature characters who were originally only NPCs and Assist Call characters in Battride War II and the Shōwa era Kamen Riders, which were absent from both previous installments of the game.

The game features an original story where the evil Shadow Moon, rival of Kamen Rider Black, makes the first monsters each Kamen Rider has faced much stronger, plotting to kill them before they can even become heroes. He starts off with Kamen Rider 1, and with his death, the history of all Kamen Riders is rewritten. The only ones unaffected are Kamen Rider Ghost, as he is already dead, and Kamen Rider Den-O, who has the Den-Liner that can travel through time. The two work together to save the other Kamen Riders and restore the original timeline.

Kohei Murakami was announced to reprise his role as Masato Kusaka/Kamen Rider Kaixa from Kamen Rider 555.

Hiroshi Fujioka reprises his role as Takeshi Hongo, Kamen Rider 1, in the video game. First edition copies of the game will come with a DLC code to access a special mission pack and a special Shocker costumed version of Takeshi Hongo.

To promote the Kamen Rider Drive Saga: Chaser V-Cinema's release, Kamen Rider Chaser was announced to be a downloadable character, followed by Ghost's Kamen Rider Specter and Kamen Rider Ghost Toucon Boost Damashii to be released around Thursday, each weeks on March after two weeks of the game's release.

The game's theme is Tourbillon's song "Colorless Images", from their upcoming album The Decade: 10th Anniversary Best.

== Gameplay ==
The gameplay is similar those of Dynasty Warriors series. The player chooses a Kamen Rider protagonist and fights various mobs through levels in the form of a beat 'em up hack and slash game. The game features boss fights against powerful foes from the various Kamen Rider series, as well as their underlings which make up the majority of enemies in the game. The Kamen Rider: Battride War series made itself unique in that the player can change their characters' forms during battle, mimicking how the protagonists can change forms in Kamen Rider, as well as allowing the player to traverse the stage on their motorcycles or other methods of transportation. Player characters can also gather energy from fighting mobs throughout the levels in order to activate special finishing moves that transform the character into their more powerful Final Form (known as the "Strongest Final Form" in the later games) for limited periods of time.

In Battride War II, a tag team system called Assist Call was introduced to allow the player to temporarily summon an NPC character to join them for a special team attack. The second game also introduces the Ultimate Final Form Gauge, which can be filled mostly through the player's attacks while the player is in a Strongest Final Form state to transform into their most powerful Final Form.

In Battride War Genesis, the Final Form gauge system was changed such that it has two tier levels; at 50%, the player can only access the Strongest Final Form, and at 100%, the player can transform from Strongest Final Form to Ultimate Final Form. Genesis also updates the vehicle system, now called the Attack Blast system, allowing character to attack while on their motorcycle, car, or other mode of transportation (except the character uses flight and super running transportation mode) in the air, after riding straight through a ramp the character encountered. The Assist Call system was also updated into the Tag Partner system such that it summons an NPC controlled ally that stays around for a set period of time, instead of just being used in a single special move as in Battride War II.

== Characters ==
Playable Character	Battride War	Battride War II	Battride War Genesis
Takeshi Hongo/Kamen Rider #1	✗	✗	✓
Takeshi Hongo (Shocker Combatant Disguise)	✗	✗	✓ (Note: Available as downloadable content)
Kamen Rider #2	✗	✗	✓
Kamen Rider V3	✗	✗	✓
Kamen Rider X	✗	✗	✓
Kamen Rider Amazon	✗	✗	✓
Kamen Rider Stronger	✗	✗	✓
Skyrider	✗	✗	✓
Kamen Rider Super 1	✗	✗	✓
|	✗ |	✗ |	✓ |
Kamen Rider Black	✗	✗	✓
Kamen Rider Black RX	✗	✗	✓
Kamen Rider Shin	✗ |	✗ |	✓ |
Kamen Rider ZO	✗ |	✓ |	✓ |
Kamen Rider J (Koji Segawa)	✗ |	✓ |	✓ |
Kamen Rider Kuuga (Yūsuke Godai)	✓	✓	✓
Kamen Rider Agito	✓	✓	✓
Kamen Rider G3-X	NPC	Support only	✓
Kamen Rider Ryuki	✓	✓	✓
Kamen Rider Knight	NPC	Support only	✓
Kamen Rider Faiz	✓	✓	✓
Kamen Rider Kaixa	NPC	Support only	✓
Kamen Rider Blade	✓	✓	✓
Kamen Rider Garren	NPC	Support only	✓
Kamen Rider Hibiki	✓	✓	✓
Kamen Rider Ibuki	NPC	Support only	✓
Kamen Rider Kabuto	✓	✓	✓
Kamen Rider Gatack	NPC (as Rider Form)	Support only (as Rider Form)	✓
Kamen Rider Den-O	✓	✓	✓
Kamen Rider Zeronos	NPC (as Zero Form)	Support only (as Zero Form)	✓
Kamen Rider Kiva	✓	✓	✓
Kamen Rider Ixa (Keisuke Nago/2000s)	NPC	Support only	✓
Kamen Rider Decade	✓	✓	✓
Kamen Rider Decade Violent Emotion	✗ (Note: Form used by a different person/counterpart)	✓	✓
Kamen Rider Kuuga (Yūsuke Onodera)	NPC	✗	✓
Kamen Rider Diend	NPC	Support only	✓
Kamen Rider Double	✓	✓	✓
Kamen Rider Double FangJoker	✓	✓	✓
Kamen Rider Joker	✗	✗	✓
Kamen Rider Accel	✓	✓	✓
Kamen Rider Eternal	✗	NPC	✓
Kamen Rider OOO	✓	✓	✓
Kamen Rider Birth (Akira Date)	✓	✓	✓
Tokugawa Yoshimune	✗	✓ (Note: Playable in two certain missions only)	✗
Kamen Rider Fourze	✓	✓	✓
Kamen Rider Meteor	✓	✓	✓
Kamen Rider Wizard	✓ (Note: Has a separate downloadable content final form prior merging in a sequel)	✓	✓
Kamen Rider Beast	✓	✓	✓
Kamen Rider Gaim	✗	✓	✓
Kamen Rider Baron	✗	✓	✓
Kamen Rider Zangetsu Shin	✗	✓	✓
Kamen Rider Drive	✗	✗	✓
Kamen Rider Mach	✗	✗	✓
Kamen Rider Chaser	✗	✗	✓
Kamen Rider Ghost	✗	✗	✓
Kamen Rider Specter	✗	✗	✓

== Voice actors ==
The Kamen Rider: Battride War video games feature the voice over roles of the actors who portrayed the characters in the television series and films.

=== From Battride War ===
- Kamen Rider Wizard: Shunya Shiraishi
- Kamen Rider Beast: Tasuku Nagase
- Phoenix: Atsumi Kanno
- Kamen Rider Fourze: Sota Fukushi (Battride War - Battride War II)
- Kamen Rider Meteor: Ryo Yoshizawa
- Sagittarius Zodiarts: Shingo Tsurumi
- Kamen Rider OOO: Shu Watanabe
- Kamen Rider Birth (Akira Date): Hiroaki Iwanaga
- Ankh: Ryosuke Miura
- Kyoryu Greeed: Yu Kamio
- Kamen Rider Double's left-half/Kamen Rider Joker (in Battride War Genesis - onwards) (Shotaro Hidari): Renn Kiriyama
- Kamen Rider Double's right-half (Philip): Masaki Suda (reused voice clips in Battride War - Battride War II)
- Kamen Rider Accel: Minehiro Kinomoto
- Weather Dopant: Tomoyuki Dan (achieved gameplay voices and credits only in Battride War II - onwards)
- Kamen Rider Decade: Masahiro Inoue
- Kamen Rider DiEnd: Kimito Totani
- Kiva-la: Miyuki Sawashiro
- Super Apollo Geist: Kazuhisa Kawahara
- Kamen Rider IXA (Keisuke Nago/2000s): Keisuke Kato
- Kamen Rider Dark Kiva (Taiga Nobori): Shouma Yamamoto
- Kivat-Bat the 3rd, Kivat-bat the 2nd: Tomokazu Sugita
- Tatsulot: Akira Ishida
- Bat Fangire: Keikō Sakai
- Kamen Rider Den-O Sword Form (Momotaros): Toshihiko Seki
- Kamen Rider Den-O Rod Form (Urataros): Kōji Yusa
- Kamen Rider Den-O Ax Form (Kintaros): Masaki Terasoma
- Kamen Rider Den-O Gun Form (Ryutaros): Kenichi Suzumura
- Kamen Rider NEW Den-O: Dori Sakurada
- Teddy: Daisuke Ono
- Albinoleo Imagin: Takaya Kuroda
- Kamen Rider Gatack: Yuki Sato
- Cassis Worm: Tak Sakaguchi
- Kamen Rider Blade: Takayuki Tsubaki
- Kamen Rider Garren: Kousei Amano
- Black Joker Undead: Ryoji Morimoto
- Kamen Rider Ryuki: Takamasa Suga
- Kamen Rider Odin: Tsuyoshi Koyama
- Kamen Rider Agito: Toshiki Kashu
- El of the Water: Kiyoyuki Yanada

=== From Battride War II ===
- Kamen Rider Gaim: Gaku Sano
- Kamen Rider Baron: Yutaka Kobayashi
- Kamen Rider Ryugen: Mahiro Takasugi
- Kamen Rider Zangetsu Shin (Takatora Kureshima): Yuki Kubota
- Kamen Rider Bujin Gaim: Rikiya Koyama
- Kamen Rider Sorcerer: Takanori Jinnai
- Groundain: Kohki Okada
- Skydain: Ayumi Kinoshita
- Tokugawa Yoshimune: Ken Matsudaira
- Kamen Rider Eternal: Mitsuru Matsuoka
- Kamen Rider IXA (Otoya Kurenai/1986): Kouhei Takeda
- Kamen Rider Den-O Wing Form (Sieg): Shin-ichiro Miki
- Kamen Rider Gaoh: Hiroyuki Watanabe
- Kamen Rider Caucasus: Musashi
- Kamen Rider Faiz: Kento Handa
- Kamen Rider Ryuga: Takamasa Suga

=== From Battride War Genesis ===
- Kamen Rider Ghost: Shun Nishime
- Kamen Rider Specter: Ryosuke Yamamoto
- Yurusen: Aoi Yuki
- Kamen Rider Drive: Ryoma Takeuchi
- Kamen Rider Mach: Yu Inaba
- Kamen Rider Chaser: Taiko Katono
- Heart Roidmude: Tomoya Warabino
- Mr. Belt: Chris Peppler
- Kamen Rider Wiseman: Toshitsugu Takashina
- Libra Zodiarts: Kousei Amano
- Kamen Rider Kuuga (Yusuke Onodera): Ryouta Murai
- Kamen Rider Zeronos (Yuto Sakurai): Yuichi Nakamura
- Kamen Rider Zeronos Vega Form/Denebick Buster (Deneb): Hōchū Ōtsuka
- Ryo Murasame/Kamen Rider ZX: Shun Sugata
- Kamen Rider Shin: Shin Ishikawa
- Kamen Rider Hibiki: Shigeki Hosokawa
- Kamen Rider Ibuki: Jouji Shibue
- Kamen Rider ZO: Kou Domon
- Kamen Rider Kaixa: Kohei Murakami
- Kamen Rider Knight: Satoshi Matsuda
- Pantheras Luteus: Jin Yamanoi
- Kamen Rider BLACK/Kamen Rider BLACK RX: Tetsuo Kurata
- Shadow Moon: Masaki Terasoma
- Takeshi Hongo/Kamen Rider 1: Hiroshi Fujioka
- Great Leader of Shocker: Tomokazu Seki
- Koji Segawa/Kamen Rider J: Yūta Mochizuki

== Reception ==
Famitsu gave the first game rating of 33/40. The game also managed to debut at the second spot of the Japanese Game Ranking for the week of May 20 to 26, 2013, selling 128,659 copies on its first week.

4Gamer.net reported that Kamen Rider: Battride War Genesis was one of the top selling video games for the week of February 22 to February 28, 2016, taking first, third, and fourth place in the week's sales on PlayStation 4, PlayStation Vita, and PlayStation 3, respectively, having sold over 77 thousand copies combined.
