= Super Hero Taisen GP: Kamen Rider 3 =

- Theatrical poster

Japanese name
- Kanji: スーパーヒーロー大戦GP 仮面ライダー3号
Transcriptions
- Revised Hepburn: Supā Hīrō Taisen Guranpuri: Kamen Raidā Sangō
- Directed by: Takayuki Shibasaki
- Written by: Shōji Yonemura
- Based on: Kamen Rider Drive by Riku Sanjo Kamen Rider Den-O by Yasuko Kobayashi Kamen Rider by Shotaro Ishinomori
- Produced by: Ishimori Productions; Toei
- Starring: Ryoma Takeuchi; Yuichi Nakamura; Yu Inaba; Rio Uchida; Kento Handa; Kousei Amano; Tetsuo Kurata; Nobuhiko Takada; Mitsuhiro Oikawa
- Narrated by: Tomokazu Seki
- Cinematography: Goro Miyazaki
- Edited by: Naoki Osada
- Music by: Shuhei Naruse; Kōtarō Nakagawa
- Production company: Toei
- Distributed by: Toei Company
- Release date: March 21, 2015
- Running time: 95 minutes
- Country: Japan
- Language: Japanese
- Box office: $45,911

Super Hero Taisen GP: Kamen Rider 3 (スーパーヒーロー大戦GP 仮面ライダー3号, Supā Hīrō Taisen Guranpuri Kamen Raidā Sangō) is the 2015 entry of the Super Hero Taisen film series, featuring the cast of Kamen Rider Drive and the appearance of Kamen Rider 3, which was originally created by Shotaro Ishinomori for the one-shot 1972 manga Rider #3 VS. General Black (3ごうライダーたい ブラックしょうぐんのまき, Sangō Raidā Tai Burakku Shōgun no Maki). Tetsuo Kurata, (Kamen Rider Black, Kamen Rider Black RX), Yuichi Nakamura (Kamen Rider Den-O), Kousei Amano, Takayuki Tsubaki, Ryoji Morimoto and Takahiro Hojo (Kamen Rider Blade), and Kento Handa (Kamen Rider 555) reprise their roles in the film, which opened in theaters on March 21, 2015. A new actor Mitsuhiro Oikawa, confirmed to perform his role as Kamen Rider 3, as well as the cast of Shuriken Sentai Ninninger will also appear.

== Plot ==
The film begins on February 10, 1973, when the final episode of the original Kamen Rider series was aired on television, but just after Kamen Riders 1 and 2 destroy Shocker for good, they are attacked and defeated by another Rider who calls himself Kamen Rider 3, triggering a green shockwave.

In the present, just after Shinnosuke Tomari as Kamen Rider Drive defeats a Roidmude, the shockwave hits the city and all the scenery around turns into an alternate reality where Shocker rules Japan and the Kamen Riders are treated as rebels except by those who sided with them, who are now named as Shocker Riders instead, with only Kiriko Shijima, protected by the Signal Legend Faiz, realizing the change, but everyone else, including Shinnosuke, believing that nothing is odd. Some time later, Kotaro Minami as Kamen Rider Black fights some members of Shocker to rescue some children, but Shinnosuke, now a Shocker Rider, appears to assist them against Kotaro. When the members of Shocker attack the children to distract Kotaro and defeat him, Kiriko realizes that Kotaro is an ally and takes him away, pretending that she is taking him under custody. After a short encounter with Kamen Rider 3, Shinnosuke confronts Kiriko for harboring a fugitive, and Kotaro explains to him that history was changed after Kamen Rider 3 defeated Kamen Riders 1 and 2, creating an alternate future where Shocker triumphed, and that he himself was a Shocker Rider until his righteousness awakened his true memories, just before Shocker attacks them, and Kotaro apparently sacrifices himself to allow Shinnosuke and Kiriko to escape.

Back to their base, Shinnosuke and Kiriko discover that their boss Jun Honganji was killed by officer Genpachiro Otta after he defended them, and awakens as a Kamen Rider. While Drive confronts Genpachiro, transformed into a Shocker monster, Kiriko is kidnapped and their captors demand Drive to surrender, but Kiriko urges him to keep fighting instead and falls from atop a building to her death, much to Shinnosuke's despair, until Kamen Rider 3 appears and rescues him. After escaping, Kamen Rider 3 reveals himself to Shinnosuke as Kyoichiro Kuroi, and that like him, he awakened as a Kamen Rider. He also affirms that despite having their bodies destroyed, Kamen Riders 1 and 2's souls are contained in artificial brains at Rider Town, where all the Riders who oppose Shocker gather. Accompanied by Kiriko's brother Go, they set off to Rider Town, joined on the way by Yuto Sakurai, while Shinnosuke leaves the group midway to make his own investigation about the situation, assisted by his friends Kyu Saijo and Rinna.

Evading capture from the Shocker Riders on some occasions, Go, Yuto and Kyoichiro end up in an ambush just before reaching Rider Town. In the occasion, one of the Shocker Riders, Takumi Inui affirms to Go that Kyoichiro is lying, while Kyoichiro holds the Shocker Riders to allow Yuto to proceed and meet the brains of Kamen Rider 1 and 2, just to discover that he fell into a trap by the Great Leader of Shocker. Kyoichiro then reveals that he was always a Shocker Rider since the beginning, and that he joined the organization by his own volition, instead of being kidnapped like his predecessors. Having realized Kyoichiro's intention by his own investigation, Shinnosuke appears, but when Kiriko, who is revealed to be still alive, is used as a hostage against him, Shinnosuke challenges the Shocker Riders on a race, promising to surrender if he loses, but demanding them to release Kiriko and the children in their custody should he wins. Taking advantage of Kyoichiro's pride, Shinnosuke convinces him to accept the challenge.

In the next day, Shinnosuke has a race against Kyoichiro and several other Shocker Riders in their vehicles, in front of a huge audience, including Shocker and the captives Yuto and Kiriko. During the race, he is attacked by the other competitors, including Mashin Chaser, who appears to fight him, but Kotaro, now able to transform into Kamen Rider Black RX, Go and a reformed Takumi step in to help him. In the end, Shinnosuke wins against Kyoichiro by a small margin, but Shocker refuses to keep their part of the bargain, and when they decide to attack the children who, inspired by the Kamen Riders, cheer for them, the adults rebel against Shocker as well. Shinnosuke then attempts to convince Kyoichiro to reform as well, but the Great Leader of Shocker's brain appears and absorbs Kyoichiro, creating the massive Rider Robo, and proceeds to use the machine created to alter the world to erase all Kamen Riders from history, until Kyoichiro forces himself out of it. Soon after, the Ninningers appear and with help from Yoshitaka Igasaki, Shinnosuke transforms his car, Tridoron into an Otomonin, which combines with the Ninningers' Otomonin to form Shurikenzin Tridoron and together, they destroy the Rider Robo, reverting history to its original course, but soon after, Go is killed while fighting the remaining Shocker members which inspire the restored Kamen Riders to defeat them.

After everything returns to normal, Yuto reveals to Shinnosuke that Kyoichiro still exists even after history was restored, giving him a little relief while he and Kiriko mourn Go's death.

== Cast ==
Kamen Rider Series cast

- Shinnosuke Tomari (泊 進ノ介, Tomari Shin'nosuke): Ryoma Takeuchi (竹内 涼真, Takeuchi Ryōma)
- Kiriko Shijima (詩島 霧子, Shijima Kiriko): Rio Uchida (内田 理央, Uchida Rio)
- Go Shijima (詩島 剛, Shijima Gō): Yu Inaba (稲葉 友, Inaba Yū)
- Rinna Sawagami (沢神 りんな, Sawagami Rinna): Rei Yoshii (吉井 怜, Yoshii Rei)
- Kyu Saijo (西城 究, Saijō Kyū): Kenta Hamano (浜野 謙太, Hamano Kenta)
- Genpachiro Otta (追田 現八郎, Otta Genpachirō): Taira Imata (井俣 太良, Imata Taira)
- Jun Honganji (本願寺 純, Honganji Jun): Tsurutaro Kataoka (片岡 鶴太郎, Kataoka Tsurutarō)
- Yuto Sakurai (桜井 侑斗, Sakurai Yūto): Yuichi Nakamura (中村 優一, Nakamura Yūichi)
- Takumi Inui (乾 巧, Inui Takumi): Kento Handa (半田 健人, Handa Kento)
- Sakuya Tachibana (橘 朔也, Tachibana Sakuya): Kousei Amano (天野 浩成, Amano Kōsei)
- Kotaro Minami (南 光太郎, Minami Kōtarō): Tetsuo Kurata (倉田 てつを, Kurata Tetsuo)

Ninninger cast

- Takaharu Igasaki (伊賀崎 天晴, Igasaki Takaharu): Shunsuke Nishikawa (西川 俊介, Nishikawa Shunsuke)
- Yakumo Kato (加藤 八雲, Katō Yakumo): Gaku Matsumoto (松本 岳, Matsumoto Gaku)
- Nagi Matsuo (松尾 凪, Matsuo Nagi): Kaito Nakamura (中村 嘉惟人, Nakamura Kaito)
- Fuka Igasaki (伊賀崎 風花, Igasaki Fūka): Yuuka Yano (矢野 優花, Yano Yūka)
- Kasumi Momochi (百地 霞, Momochi Kasumi): Kasumi Yamaya (山谷 花純, Yamaya Kasumi)
- Yoshitaka Igasaki (伊賀崎 好天, Igasaki Yoshitaka): Takashi Sasano (笹野 高史, Sasano Takashi)

Super Hero Taisen GP cast

- Kyoichiro Kuroi (黒井 響一郎, Kuroi Kyōichirō): Mitsuhiro Oikawa (及川 光博, Oikawa Mitsuhiro)
- General Black (ブラック将軍, Burakku Shōgun): Nobuhiko Takada (高田 延彦, Takada Nobuhiko)
- Tobei Tachibana (立花 藤兵衛, Tachibana Tōbei): Rakkyo Ide (井出 らっきょ, Ide Rakkyo)
- Mitsuru (ミツル): Masahiro Ezaki (江崎 政博, Ezaki Masahiro)
- Naoki (ナオキ): Mitsumasa Sato (佐藤 光将, Satō Mitsumasa)
- Shigeru (シゲル): Daikichi Sano (佐野 代吉, Sano Daikichi)

Voice Cast

- Mashin Chaser (魔進チェイサー, Mashin Cheisā): Taiko Katono (上遠野 太洸, Katōno Taikō)
- Mr. Belt (ベルトさん, Beruto-san), Drive Driver Equipment Voice: Chris Peppler (クリス・ペプラー, Kurisu Pepurā)
- Kamen Rider Blade (仮面ライダーブレイド, Kamen Raidā Bureido): Takayuki Tsubaki (椿 隆之, Tsubaki Takayuki)
- Kamen Rider Chalice (仮面ライダーカリス, Kamen Raidā Karisu): Ryoji Morimoto (森本 亮治, Morimoto Ryōji)
- Kamen Rider Leangle (仮面ライダーレンゲル, Kamen Raidā Rengeru): Takahiro Hōjō (北条 隆博, Hōjō Takahiro)
- Deneb (デネブ, Denebu): Hōchū Ōtsuka (大塚 芳忠, Ōtsuka Hōchū)
- Kamen Rider 1 (仮面ライダー1号, Kamen Raidā Ichigō): Tetsu Inada (稲田 徹, Inada Testu)
- Kamen Rider 2 (仮面ライダー2号, Kamen Raidā Nigō): Kunihiro Kawamoto (河本 邦弘, Kawamoto Kunihiro)
- Riderman (ライダーマン, Raidāman): Hideo Ishikawa (石川 英郎, Ishikawa Hideo)
- Faiz Driver Equipment Voice: Takehiko Kano (假野 剛彦, Kano Takehiko)
- Rouzer Voice: Takeshi Sasaki (佐々木 健, Sasaki Takeshi)
- Kabuto Zecter Voice: Surage Gajria (スラージ・ガジリア, Surāji Gajiria)
- Sengoku Driver Equipment Voice: Seiji Hiratoko (平床 政治, Hiratoko Seiji)
- Ninninger Equipment Voice: Tsutomu Tareki (垂木 勉, Tareki Tsutomu)
- Narration, Great Leader of Shocker (ショッカー大首領, Shokkā Daishuryō), Kamen Rider V3 (仮面ライダーV3, Kamen Raidā Bui Surī), Kamen Rider Amazon (仮面ライダーアマゾン, Kamen Raidā Amazon), Kamen Rider Stronger (仮面ライダーストロンガー, Kamen Raidā Sutorongā), Kamen Rider Super-1 (仮面ライダースーパー1, Kamen Raidā Sūpāwan), Kamen Rider Double (仮面ライダーダブル, Kamen Raidā Daburu), Girizames (ギリザメス, Girizamesu), Shiomaneking (シオマネキング, Shiomanekingu), Kame Bazooka (カメバズーカ, Kame Bazūka), Marshal Machine (マシーン大元帥, Mashīn Daigensui): Tomokazu Seki (関 智一, Seki Tomokazu)

== Theme song ==
- "Who's That Guy"
  - Lyrics: Shoko Fujibayashi
  - Composition & Arrangement: SAKOSHIN
  - Artist: Mitsuhiro Oikawa

== Kamen Rider 4 ==
The first million ticket buyers received a special DVD featuring the first episode of the three episode series, titled Kamen Rider 4 (仮面ライダー4号, Kamen Raidā Yongō) that is a sequel to Super Hero Taisen GP: Kamen Rider 3. d-Video began distribution of the first two episodes on March 28, 2015 and the final episode on April 4, 2015. Mitsuru Karahashi (Kamen Rider 555) reprises his role in the series. Mitsuru Matsuoka performs his voice role as Kamen Rider 4 and also performs the series's theme song "time" under the special band Mitsuru Matsuoka EARNEST DRIVE. The series is directed by Kyohei Yamaguchi and written by Nobuhiro Mouri.

1. Deathmatch! The Kamen Rider Died Three Times!! (死斗！仮面ライダーは三度死ぬ！！, Shitō! Kamen Raidā wa Sando Shinu!!)
2. Fighting!! The Airstrike of Sky Cyclone (対決！！スカイサイクロン空襲, Taiketsu!! Sukai Saikuron Kūshū)
3. Duel! The True Identity of the Great Leader of Shocker (決斗！ショッカー首領の正体, Kettō! Shokkā Shuryō no Shōtai)

== Reception ==
Super Hero Taisen GP: Kamen Rider 3 grossed $45,911 at the box office.
