= Sakuya Tachibana =

Sakuya Tachibana may refer to:

- Sakuya Tachibana, a character in the television series Kamen Rider Blade
- Sakuya Tachibana, a character in the video game God Eater
