= Takayuki Tsubaki =

Japanese actor

- 椿隆之
- Tsubaki at Japan World Heroes 2019, doing Kamen Rider Blade's transformation pose
- Born: Takayuki Tsubaki; June 28, 1982 (age 44); Chiba prefecture, Japan
- Occupations: Actor, YouTuber
- Years active: 2001–present
- Height: 185 cm (6 ft 1 in)

Takayuki Tsubaki (Japanese: 椿隆之, Hepburn: Tsubaki Takayuki; born June 28, 1982) is a Japanese actor and YouTuber best remembered for his role as Kazuma Kenzaki, the protagonist in the tokusatsu series Kamen Rider Blade.

On November 9, 2016, Tsubaki was seriously beaten and injured by a motorcyclist's younger brother with a golf club on his face during an argument with the motorcyclist at 9:00 PM. However, his Kamen Rider Blade co-stars Ryoji Morimoto and Takahiro Hojo confirmed that Tsubaki's condition is in good condition the following day.

== Filmography ==
=== Television ===
- Kamen Rider Blade (2004) as Kazuma Kenzaki/Kamen Rider Blade
- Kamen Rider Decade (2009) as Kazuma Kenzaki/Kamen Rider Blade (ep. 30–31)
- Kamen Rider Zi-O (2019) as Kazuma Kenzaki/Kamen Rider Blade (ep. 29–30)

=== Film ===
- Go (2001)
- Kamen Rider Blade: Missing Ace (2004) as Kazuma Kenzaki/Kamen Rider Blade
- Master of Thunder (2006) as Tooru
- Kamen Rider × Kamen Rider W & Decade: Movie War 2010: Decade: The Last Story (2009) as Kazuma Kenzaki/Kamen Rider Blade (voice only)
- Super Hero Taisen GP: Kamen Rider 3 (2015) as Kazuma Kenzaki/Kamen Rider Blade (voice only)
- Kamen Sentai Gorider (2017) as Kazuma Kenzaki/Kamen Rider Blade

=== Video games ===
- Kamen Rider Blade as Kamen Rider Blade
- All Kamen Rider: Rider Generation 2 as Kamen Rider Blade
- Kamen Rider: Super Climax Heroes as Kamen Rider Blade
- Kamen Rider: Battride War as Kamen Rider Blade
