= Akira Kubodera =

Japanese actor (1977–2020)

- 窪寺 昭
- Born: January 20, 1977; Tokyo, Japan
- Died: November 13, 2020 (aged 43); Nakano, Tokyo, Japan
- Occupation: Actor
- Years active: 1995–2020
- Agent: Hirata Office
- Spouse: Hiroko Ōmori (m. 2007)
- Website: www.hirata-office.jp/talent_profile/men/kubodera_akira.html

Akira Kubodera (窪寺 昭, Kubodera Akira; January 20, 1977 – November 13, 2020) was a Japanese actor.

== Personal life ==
On January 23, 2011, Kubodera announced at his 15th anniversary fan meeting that he had been married to actress Hiroko Ōmori since 2007.

== Death ==
On November 13, 2020, shortly after noon, Kubodera was found unresponsive at his home in Nakano, Tokyo and was taken to a hospital, where he was pronounced dead. The cause of his death is believed to be suicide.

== Filmography ==
=== Television ===
Year	Title	Role	Network	Notes	Ref(s)
2003	Pretty Guardian Sailor Moon	Kunzite	CBC		
2004	Kamen Rider Blade	Kanai	TV Asahi		
2008	Kamen Rider Kiva	Aberu	TV Asahi	Episode 29-31, 38, 39, 46-48	
2020	M: Aisubeki Hito ga Ite		Abema TV	Episode 4	

=== Theater ===
Year	Title	Role	Notes	Ref(s)
2015	Musical Hakuōki: Shinsengumi Kitan	Kamo Serizawa		
2017	Osomatsu-san	Iyami	Supporting role	
2019	Mobile Suit Gundam 00 Re:Build	Ali al-Saachez		
2020	Mobile Suit Gundam 00 Re:(in)novation	Ali al-Saachez		
