= Kamen Rider Blade =

Japanese superhero television series

- Also known as: Masked Rider Blade; Masked Rider ♠
- Genre: Tokusatsu; Superhero fiction Action; Fantasy; Psychological drama
- Created by: Shotaro Ishinomori
- Written by: Shōji Imai; Sho Aikawa
- Directed by: Hidenori Ishida
- Starring: Takayuki Tsubaki; Ryoji Morimoto; Kousei Amano; Takahiro Hōjō; Yumi Egawa; Terunosuke Takezai; Hikari Kajiwara; Kaori Yamaguchi; Kazuhiro Yamaji
- Narrated by: Jūrōta Kosugi
- Opening theme: "Round ZERO~BLADE BRAVE" by Nanase Aikawa; "ELEMENTS" by Rider Chips featuring Ricky
- Composer: Kazunori Miyake
- Country of origin: Japan
- No. of episodes: 49 (list of episodes)

Production
- Producers: Saeko Matsuda (TV Asahi); Jun Hikasa (Toei); Naomi Takebe (Toei); Takaaki Utsunomiya (Toei)
- Running time: 20–25 minutes
- Production companies: Toei Company; Ishimori Productions; TV Asahi Corporation; Asatsu-DK

Original release
- Network: TV Asahi
- Release: January 25, 2004 – January 23, 2005

Related
- Kamen Rider 555; Kamen Rider Hibiki

Kamen Rider Blade (仮面ライダー剣(ブレイド), Kamen Raidā Bureido) is a Japanese tokusatsu superhero television series. It is the 14th installment in the Kamen Rider Series. It aired on TV Asahi from January 25, 2004 to January 23, 2005. It is a joint collaboration between Ishimori Productions and Toei. Along with the standard insect motif of the Kamen Rider series, Kamen Rider Blade also uses a playing card motif. Each Rider is assigned one of the suits from a deck of cards. It aired as a part of TV Asahi's 2004 Super Hero Time block with Tokusou Sentai Dekaranger.

Blade was later released on DVD by Toei. There were twelve volumes released with the first eleven having four episodes per DVD and the twelfth volume with five episodes.

== Story ==
Ten thousand years ago, a massive battle known as the Battle Royal was fought by fifty-two Undead, each representing a species fighting for dominance over all others. The winner was the Human Undead, known as Category Two of Hearts, giving dominion of the Earth to humanity. In the present day, archaeologists discover the sealed Undead, and accidentally set them free. Thus, a new Battle Royal begins.

Having developed the Rider System, based on the Joker's ability to copy sealed Undead, the organization BOARD (Board Of Archaeological Research Department) equips two young men, who become Kamen Riders: Kazuma Kenzaki and Sakuya Tachibana fight together as Kamen Rider Blade and Kamen Rider Garren to protect humans from Undead and seal them. Also fighting Undead is the mysterious Hajime Aikawa as Kamen Rider Chalice, whose purpose is unknown. In addition, a young man named Mutsuki Kamijo struggles to free himself from the control of the sealed Undead powering his own Undead-made Rider System, fighting as Kamen Rider Leangle.

== Episodes ==
No.	Title	Directed by	Written by	Original release date
1	"The Indigo Warrior"; Transliteration: "Shikon no Senshi" (Japanese: 紫紺の戦士)	Hidenori Ishida	Shōji Imai	January 25, 2004
2	"The Mysterious Rider"; Transliteration: "Nazo no Raidā" (Japanese: 謎のライダー)	Hidenori Ishida	Shōji Imai	February 1, 2004
3	"Their Secret..."; Transliteration: "Karera no Himitsu..." (Japanese: 彼らの秘密…)	Nobuhiro Suzumura	Shōji Imai	February 8, 2004
4	"Immortality's Mysteries"; Transliteration: "Eien no Inochi no Nazo" (Japanese: 永遠の命の謎)	Nobuhiro Suzumura	Shōji Imai; Sōkichi Imai	February 15, 2004
5	"The Challenge to the Past"; Transliteration: "Kako e no Chōsen" (Japanese: 過去への挑戦)	Takao Nagaishi	Shōji Imai	February 22, 2004
6	"Chalice's True Identity"; Transliteration: "Karisu no Shōtai" (Japanese: カリスの正体)	Takao Nagaishi	Shōji Imai	February 29, 2004
7	"The Trapped Two"; Transliteration: "Torawareta Ni-gō" (Japanese: 囚われた2号)	Satoshi Morota	Shōji Imai	March 7, 2004
8	"The Revived People"; Transliteration: "Yomigaetta Mono-tachi" (Japanese: 甦った者たち)	Satoshi Morota	Shōji Imai	March 14, 2004
9	"A Fighter's Destiny"; Transliteration: "Tatakau Mono no Unmei" (Japanese: 戦う者の運命)	Hidenori Ishida	Shōji Imai	March 21, 2004
10	"The Manipulated Warrior"; Transliteration: "Ayatsurareta Senshi" (Japanese: 操られた戦士)	Hidenori Ishida	Shōji Imai	March 28, 2004
11	"The Whereabouts of Each"; Transliteration: "Onoono no Ibasho" (Japanese: 各々の居場所)	Nobuhiro Suzumura	Junichi Miyashita	April 4, 2004
12	"Category Ace"; Transliteration: "Kategorī Ēsu" (Japanese: カテゴリーΑ)	Nobuhiro Suzumura	Junichi Miyashita	April 11, 2004
13	"The Golden-Threaded Trap"; Transliteration: "Kin'iro no Ito no Wana" (Japanese: 金色の糸の罠)	Takao Nagaishi	Shōji Imai	April 18, 2004
14	"Ace Sealed!"; Transliteration: "Ēsu Fūin!" (Japanese: エース封印!)	Takao Nagaishi	Shōji Imai	April 25, 2004
15	"Fate's Conformer"; Transliteration: "Unmei no Tekigōsha" (Japanese: 運命の適合者)	Satoshi Morota	Shōji Imai	May 2, 2004
16	"Leangle's Power"; Transliteration: "Rengeru no Chikara" (Japanese: レンゲルの力)	Satoshi Morota	Shōji Imai	May 9, 2004
17	"The Evil Belt"; Transliteration: "Jaaku na Beruto" (Japanese: 邪悪なベルト)	Hidenori Ishida	Toshiki Inoue	May 16, 2004
18	"Spirits That Manipulate Darkness"; Transliteration: "Kurayami o Ayatsuru Tamashii" (Japanese: 暗闇を操る魂)	Hidenori Ishida	Toshiki Inoue	May 23, 2004
19	"One Who Conquers Darkness"; Transliteration: "Ankoku o Seisu Mono" (Japanese: 暗黒を征す者)	Hidenori Ishida	Toshiki Inoue	May 30, 2004
20	"The Target is Kotaro"; Transliteration: "Hyōteki wa Kotarō" (Japanese: 標的は虎太郎)	Takao Nagaishi	Shōji Imai	June 6, 2004
21	"Battles That Feel for Friends"; Transliteration: "Tomo o Omou Tatakai" (Japanese: 友を思う戦い)	Takao Nagaishi	Shōji Imai	June 13, 2004
22	"The Escape From Darkness"; Transliteration: "Yami Kara no Dasshutsu" (Japanese: 闇からの脱出)	Satoshi Morota	Shō Aikawa	June 27, 2004
23	"Who Are You?"; Transliteration: "Omae wa Dare da?" (Japanese: お前は誰だ?)	Satoshi Morota	Shō Aikawa	July 4, 2004
24	"Mysterious Hunters"; Transliteration: "Nazo no Hantā" (Japanese: 謎のハンター)	Kenkō Satō	Shō Aikawa	July 11, 2004
25	"A Traitor's Sprint"; Transliteration: "Uragiri no Shissō" (Japanese: 裏切りの疾走)	Kenkō Satō	Shō Aikawa	July 18, 2004
26	"The Power Which Moves Me"; Transliteration: "Ore o Ugokasu Chikara" (Japanese: 俺を動かす力)	Takao Nagaishi	Shōji Imai	July 25, 2004
27	"The Trembling Heart..."; Transliteration: "Yureugoku Kokoro..." (Japanese: 揺れ動く心…)	Takao Nagaishi	Shōji Imai	August 1, 2004
28	"A Dangerous Gamble!?"; Transliteration: "Kiken na Kake!?" (Japanese: 危険な賭け!?)	Satoshi Morota	Shōji Imai	August 8, 2004
29	"The Two Chalices"; Transliteration: "Futari no Karisu" (Japanese: 2人のカリス)	Satoshi Morota	Toshiki Inoue	August 15, 2004
30	"Lost Memories"; Transliteration: "Ushinawareta Kioku" (Japanese: 失われた記憶)	Satoshi Morota	Toshiki Inoue	August 22, 2004
31	"The 53rd Being"; Transliteration: "Gojū-san-ban-me no Sonzai" (Japanese: 53番目の存在)	Takao Nagaishi	Shō Aikawa	September 5, 2004
32	"The Destroyer's Secret"; Transliteration: "Hakaisha no Himitsu" (Japanese: 破壊者の秘密)	Takao Nagaishi	Shō Aikawa	September 12, 2004
33	"The Targeted Kenzaki"; Transliteration: "Nerawareta Kenzaki" (Japanese: 狙われた剣崎)	Kunio Iki	Shō Aikawa	September 19, 2004
34	"Category King"; Transliteration: "Kategorī Kingu" (Japanese: カテゴリーK)	Kunio Iki	Shō Aikawa	September 26, 2004
35	"A Dangerous Transformation!?"; Transliteration: "Kiken na Henshin!?" (Japanese: 危険な変身!?)	Satoshi Morota	Shō Aikawa	October 3, 2004
36	"Strongest Form"; Transliteration: "Saikyō Fōmu" (Japanese: 最強フォーム)	Satoshi Morota	Shō Aikawa	October 10, 2004
37	"Towards a New Destiny"; Transliteration: "Arata na Unmei e" (Japanese: 新たな運命へ)	Takao Nagaishi	Shō Aikawa	October 17, 2004
38	"One Who Takes Hold of Destiny"; Transliteration: "Unmei o Tsukamu Mono" (Japanese: 運命を掴む者)	Takao Nagaishi	Shō Aikawa	October 24, 2004
39	"Reunion...Father and Daughter"; Transliteration: "Saikai...Chichi to Musume" (Japanese: 再会…父と娘)	Hidenori Ishida	Junichi Miyashita	October 31, 2004
40	"Parting With the Past"; Transliteration: "Kako to no Ketsubetsu" (Japanese: 過去との訣別)	Hidenori Ishida	Junichi Miyashita	November 14, 2004
41	"A Desire to Get Stronger"; Transliteration: "Tsuyokunaritai" (Japanese: 強くなりたい)	Nobuhiro Suzumura	Shō Aikawa	November 21, 2004
42	"Leangle Revives"; Transliteration: "Rengeru Fukkatsu" (Japanese: レンゲル復活)	Nobuhiro Suzumura	Shō Aikawa	November 28, 2004
43	"Foe or Friend?"; Transliteration: "Teki ka Mikata ka?" (Japanese: 敵か味方か?)	Takao Nagaishi	Toshiki Inoue	December 5, 2004
44	"Four of a Kind"; Transliteration: "Fō Kādo" (Japanese: フォーカード)	Takao Nagaishi	Toshiki Inoue	December 12, 2004
45	"The New Card"; Transliteration: "Arata na Kādo" (Japanese: 新たなカード)	Satoshi Morota	Shō Aikawa	December 19, 2004
46	"The Ruler's Seal"; Transliteration: "Shihaisha no Fūin" (Japanese: 支配者の封印)	Satoshi Morota	Shō Aikawa	December 26, 2004
47	"Garren Eliminated"; Transliteration: "Gyaren Shōmetsu" (Japanese: ギャレン消滅)	Satoshi Morota	Shō Aikawa	January 9, 2005
48	"Prologue to Destruction"; Transliteration: "Horobi e no Joshō" (Japanese: 滅びへの序章)	Takao Nagaishi	Shō Aikawa	January 16, 2005
49 (Finale)	"The Eternal Trump"; Transliteration: "Eien no Kirifuda" (Japanese: 永遠の切り札)	Takao Nagaishi	Shō Aikawa	January 23, 2005

== Films ==
=== Missing Ace ===
Kamen Rider Blade the Movie: Missing Ace (劇場版 仮面ライダー剣 MISSING ACE, Gekijōban Kamen Raidā Bureido Misshingu Ēsu) is a film released in theaters on September 11, 2004, double-billed with Tokusou Sentai Dekaranger The Movie: Full Blast Action.

Deviating from the series finale, Kazuma was forced to seal away Hajime during their final battle. Four years later, the characters have moved on with their lives: Kazuma is a garbage man, Mutsuki has graduated from high school, and Kotarō has published a book about the Kamen Riders to great success, but on Amane's upcoming birthday, it was revealed that she has become a delinquent without the emotional support of Hajime. The Undead have been re-released, and a new trio of Kamen Riders—Glaive, Larc and Lance—have emerged from BOARD, now led by Tachibana. After recapturing two of the Category Aces, Kazuma and Mutsuki join with the new Riders. When all the Undead are sealed once more, Glaive reveals himself to be the Albino Joker, a white version of the original Joker, and seals Amane in the Vanity Card in his scheme to obtain ultimate power. In order to free Amane from the card, Hajime is unsealed from the Joker Card and the four Riders are again united, intent on saving Amane and stopping the Albino Joker.

=== Super Hero Taisen GP ===
Super Hero Taisen GP: Kamen Rider 3 (スーパーヒーロー大戦GP 仮面ライダー3号, Supā Hīrō Taisen Guranpuri Kamen Raidā Sangō) is the 2015 entry of the "Super Hero Taisen" film series, featuring the cast of Kamen Rider Drive and the appearance of Kamen Rider 3, which was originally created by Shotaro Ishinomori for the one-shot 1972 manga Rider #3 VS. General Black (3ごうライダーたい ブラックしょうぐんのまき, Sangō Raidā Tai Burakku Shōgun no Maki). Kousei Amano, Takayuki Tsubaki, Ryoji Morimoto and Takahiro Hojo reprised their roles in this film, which opened in theaters on March 21, 2015.

== V-Cinema ==
It was reported from the people who had attended Kamen Rider Blade Special Off Meeting in 2016 had reported that the members have announced the production of V-Cinema for Kamen Rider Blade. Ryoji Morimoto had said that the V-Cinema is just one step away. Takayuki Tsubaki had also told there since there was demand of Kamen Rider Garren's King form in various social networks, there are chances that this form may appear in the V-Cinema.

== Specials ==
Kamen Rider Blade: Blade vs. Blade (仮面ライダー剣（ブレイド） ブレイドVSブレイド, Kamen Raidā Bureido: Bureido Buiesu Bureido) is a Hyper Battle Video, wherein a Trial-series cyborg pretends to be Kenzaki and copies the Blay Rouzer, starting a fight with the real Kenzaki. During their battle, Tachibana and Mutsuki are unable to tell the two apart, which results in their humorously attacking the real Kenzaki (shooting him in the rear end and bashing him over the head), before Hajime steps in and reveals the impostor. As with all Hyper Battle Videos, this serves as a device to exposit the Rider's various powers and abilities.

Kamen Rider Blade: New Generation is a television special made of a collection of vignettes which aired following certain episodes of Kamen Rider Blade, following the history of Kamen Riders Glaive, L'arc, and Lance. This is a direct tie-in to the movie Missing Ace.

== Production ==
The Kamen Rider Blade trademark was registered by Toei on November 10, 2003.

== S.I.C. Hero Saga ==
The S.I.C. Hero Saga side story for Blade is titled Masked Rider Blade: Day After Tomorrow (MASKED RIDER BLADE -DAY AFTER TOMORROW-) follows the story of the series after the finale and features characters from Missing Ace. The new character introduced in the story is Joker (Kazuma Kenzaki ver.) (ジョーカー（剣崎一真ver.）, Jōkā (Kenzaki Kazuma ver.)). Two other special editions of the Hero Saga stories also feature Blade characters: Hero Saga Special Edition: King featuring Kamen Rider Garren King Form (仮面ライダーギャレン・キングフォーム, Kamen Raidā Gyaren Kingu Fōmu) and Hero Saga Special Edition: Clover featuring Kamen Rider Leangle Jack Form (仮面ライダーレンゲル・ジャックフォーム, Kamen Raidā Rengeru Jakku Fōmu). Day After Tomorrow ran in the February through May 2007 issues of Monthly Hobby Japan magazine. King was featured in the May 2008 issue and Clover was featured in the June 2008 issue.

Chapter titles

1. The Melancholy of Mutsuki Kamijo (上城睦月の憂鬱, Kamijō Mutsuki no Yūutsu)
2. The Howl of Hajime Aikawa (相川始の咆哮, Aikawa Hajime no Hōkō)
3. The Blunder of Sakuya Tachibana (橘朔也の失策, Tachibana Sakuya no Shissaku)
4. The Mentality of Kazuma Kenzaki (剣崎一真の心情, Kenzaki Kazuma no Shinjō)

== Novel ==
Novel: Kamen Rider Blade (小説 仮面ライダーブレイド, Shōsetsu Kamen Raidā Bureido), written by Junichi Miyashita, is part of a series of spin-off novel adaptations of the Heisei Era Kamen Rider Series. This sequel to the TV series takes place 300 years following the television series finale. It chronicles Kenzaki's quest to end his life as the Navy Joker after three centuries. In one instance, Kenzaki is captured by a criminal organization and is tortured, but still does not die.

Later in the novel, he becomes a war photographer, and all he sees is death. He then enlists in the army for a foreign country, steps on landmines and explodes. Also named are the new Garren and Leangle, Tachihara and Satsuki.

The only returning characters are Kenzaki and Hajime. Kenzaki has a weaker personality compared to the TV series due to living for a long time and seeing a lot of horrible things. Satsuki, the new Leangle's treated the same like the original Leangle, Mutsuki.

The novel was released on February 28, 2013.

== Cast ==
- Kazuma Kenzaki (剣崎 一真, Kenzaki Kazuma): Takayuki Tsubaki (椿 隆之, Tsubaki Takayuki)
- Sakuya Tachibana (橘 朔也, Tachibana Sakuya): Kousei Amano (天野 浩成, Amano Kōsei) (Played as "Hironari Amano")
- Hajime Aikawa (相川 始, Aikawa Hajime), Ryo Mikami (三上 了, Mikami Ryō; 29, 30): Ryoji Morimoto (森本 亮治, Morimoto Ryōji)
- Mutsuki Kamijo (上城 睦月, Kamijō Mutsuki): Takahiro Hōjō (北条 隆博, Hōjō Takahiro)
- Shiori Hirose (広瀬 栞, Hirose Shiori): Yumi Egawa (江川 有未, Egawa Yumi)
- Kotaro Shirai (白井 虎太郎, Shirai Kotarō): Terunosuke Takezai (竹財 輝之助, Takezai Terunosuke)
- Haruka Kurihara (栗原 遥香, Kurihara Haruka): Kaori Yamaguchi (山口 香緒里, Yamaguchi Kaori)
- Amane Kurihara (栗原 天音, Kurihara Amane): Hikari Kajiwara (梶原 ひかり, Kajiwara Hikari)
- Nozomi Yamanaka (山中 望美, Yamanaka Nozomi): Arisa Miyazawa (宮澤 亜理沙, Miyazawa Arisa)
- Kei Karasuma (烏丸 啓, Karasuma Kei): Kazuhiro Yamaji (山路 和弘, Yamaji Kazuhiro)
- Yoshito Hirose (広瀬 義人, Hirose Yoshito): Junichi Haruta (春田 純一, Haruta Jun'ichi)
- Hiroshi Tennoji (天王路 博史, Ten'nōji Hiroshi): Kohji Moritsugu (森次 晃嗣, Moritsugu Kōji)
- Sayoko Fukasawa (深沢 小夜子, Fukasawa Sayoko): Urara Awata (粟田 麗, Awata Urara)
- Isaka (伊坂): Yasukaze Motomiya (本宮 泰風, Motomiya Yasukaze)
- Miyuki Yoshinaga (吉永 みゆき, Yoshinaga Miyuki): Mika Hijii (肘井 美佳, Hijii Mika)
- Noboru Shima (嶋 昇, Shima Noboru): Kazunari Aizawa (相澤 一成, Aizawa Kazunari)
- King (キング, Kingu): Makoto Kamijo (上條 誠, Kamijō Makoto)
- Hikaru Jō (城 光, Jō Hikaru): Akane Hamasaki (浜崎 茜, Hamasaki Akane)
- Kanai (金居): Akira Kubodera (窪寺 昭, Kubodera Akira)

=== Voice cast ===
- Rouzers (ラウザー, Rauzā): Takeshi Sasaki (佐々木 健, Sasaki Takeshi)
- Rouse Absorber (ラウズアブゾーバー, Rauzu Abuzōbā), King Rouzer (キングラウザー, Kingu Rauzā), Wild Slasher (ワイルドスラッシャー, Wairudo Surasshā): Fumihiko Tachiki (立木 文彦, Tachiki Fumihiko)
- Narrator: Jūrōta Kosugi (小杉 十郎太, Kosugi Jūrōta)

=== Guest cast ===
- Yu Ichinose (一之瀬 優, Ichinose Yū; 11–12): Takashi Inoue (井上 高志, Inoue Takashi)
- Rei Kamioka (神丘 令, Kamioka Rei; 22–23): Toko Fujita (藤田 瞳子, Fujita Tōko)
- Takahara (高原; 22–23): Yasufumi Hayashi (林 泰文, Hayashi Yasufumi)
- Shinmei (新名; 24–25): Masashi Kagami (加々美 正史, Kagami Masashi)
- Himself (24–25): Tatsuya Yamaguchi (山口 辰也, Yamaguchi Tatsuya)
- Azumi (あずみ; 29–30): Mio Fukuzumi (福澄 美緒, Fukuzumi Mio)
- Saburo Tako (蛸 三郎, Tako Saburō; 29–30): Taro Suwa (諏訪 太朗, Suwa Tarō)
- Police officer (48): Yuuki Kuroda (黒田 勇樹, Kuroda Yūki)

== Songs ==
Opening themes

- "Round ZERO~BLADE BRAVE"
  - Lyrics: Shoko Fujibayashi
  - Composition: Katsuya Yoshida
  - Arrangement: Akio Kondō
  - Artist: Nanase Aikawa
  - Episodes: 1–30
- "ELEMENTS"
  - Lyrics: Shoko Fujibayashi
  - Composition: Miki Fujisue
  - Arrangement: RIDER CHIPS + Cher Watanabe
  - Artist: RIDER CHIPS Featuring Ricky
  - Episodes: 31–49
  After his performance in "ELEMENTS," Ricky was made RIDER CHIPS' permanent vocalist.

Insert themes

- "Kakusei" (覚醒; "Awakening")
  - Lyrics: Shoko Fujibayashi
  - Composition: Cher Watanabe
  - Arrangement: Akio Kondō
  - Artist: Ricky
  - Episodes: 2–23
- "rebirth"
  - Lyrics: Shoko Fujibayashi
  - Composition: Yukari Aono
  - Arrangement: Cher Watanabe
  - Artist: Sakuya Tachibana (Kousei Amano)
  - Episodes: 23–30, 47
- "take it a try"
  - Lyrics: Shoko Fujibayashi
  - Composition & Arrangement: Cher Watanabe
  - Artist: Hajime Aikawa (Ryoji Morimoto)
  - Episodes: 31–49

== Video game ==
A video game based on the series was produced by Bandai for the PlayStation 2. It is an action game that featured many of the characters from the TV series. It was released only in Japan near the end of the TV series on December 9, 2004.

== International broadcasts ==
Country	Network(s)	Airing Date(s)	Note(s)
Republic of Korea	CHAMP TV; ANIONE; ANIBOX	2007	It was aired with a Korean dub.
Thailand	iTV (Thailand)	Unknown	It was aired with a Thai dub.
Philippines	GMA Network; TV5	2007 (GMA Network); 2008-2009 (TV5)	It was aired with a Tagalog dub.
Malaysia	NTV7	Unknown	It was aired with a Malay dub.
Hong Kong	TVB	Unknown	It was aired with a Chinese dub.
Indonesia	ANTV	Unknown	It was aired with an Indonesian dub.
