= Kamen Rider Blade: Missing Ace =

Kamen Rider Blade the Movie: Missing Ace
- Cover art of DVD.

Japanese name
- Kanji: 劇場版 仮面ライダー剣 MISSING ACE
Transcriptions
- Revised Hepburn: Gekijōban Kamen Raidā Bureido Misshingu Ēsu
- Directed by: Hidenori Ishida; Katsuya Watanabe
- Written by: Toshiki Inoue
- Based on: Kamen Rider Blade by Shoji Imai
- Produced by: Ishimori Productions; Toei
- Starring: Takayuki Tsubaki; Ryoji Morimoto; Kousei Amano; Takahiro Hōjō; Yumi Egawa; Terunosuke Takezai; Yuuki Kuroda; Yoko Mitsuya; Takao Sugiura; Miku Ishida
- Cinematography: Masao Inokuma
- Edited by: Naoki Osada
- Music by: Kazunori Miyake
- Production company: Toei
- Distributed by: Toei Co. Ltd
- Release date: September 11, 2004
- Running time: 75 minutes 90 minutes (Director's Cut)
- Country: Japan
- Language: Japanese

Kamen Rider Blade the Movie: Missing Ace (劇場版 仮面ライダー剣 MISSING ACE, Gekijōban Kamen Raidā Bureido Misshingu Ēsu) is the theatrical superhero film adaptation of the Japanese 2004 Kamen Rider series, Kamen Rider Blade, directed by Hidenori Ishida and Katsuya Watanabe and written by Toshiki Inoue.

The film is produced by Ishimori Productions and Toei, the producers of all the previous television series and films of the Kamen Rider series. Following the tradition of all Heisei Kamen Rider movies, it is a double bill with the movie for 2004's Super Sentai series Tokusou Sentai Dekaranger, Tokusou Sentai Dekaranger The Movie: Full Blast Action, both of which premiered on September 11, 2004. The film's title is translated into English as Masked Rider Blade The Movie: Missing Ace.

The Director's Cut was released on DVD on May 21, 2005, and peaked at number 13 in the weekly Oricon chart, remaining in the list for 5 weeks. A Blu-Ray reissue of the movie was released on June 13, 2010.

== Plot ==
Four years after an alternate ending to the series, in which Blade seals the Joker, the characters have moved on with their lives: Kenzaki is a garbage man which in comparison to the chaos he went through was a huge change of pace, Mutsuki has graduated high school, and Kotarō has published a book about the Kamen Riders to great success, but on Amane's upcoming birthday, it was revealed that she has become a delinquent without the emotional support of Hajime. The Undead have been re-released, and a new trio of Kamen Riders—Glaive, Larc and Lance—have emerged from BOARD, now led by Tachibana. After recapturing two of the Category Aces, Kenzaki and Mutsuki join with the new Riders. When all the Undead are sealed once more, Glaive reveals himself to be the Albino Joker, a white version of the original Joker, and captures Kotarō's niece to obtain the ultimate power, sealing her in the Vanity Card. In order to free Amane from the card, Hajime is unsealed from the Joker Card and the four Riders are again united, intent on saving Amane and stopping the Albino Joker. In the end, Hajime swaps his life for Amane in the Vanity Card and allows himself to be destroyed by Blade to weaken Jashin 14. Blade uses his King Form to cut Jashin 14 in half, putting an end to the Undead.

== Cast ==
- Kazuma Kenzaki (剣崎 一真, Kenzaki Kazuma): Takayuki Tsubaki (椿 隆之, Tsubaki Takayuki)
- Hajime Aikawa (相川 始, Aikawa Hajime): Ryoji Morimoto (森本 亮治, Morimoto Ryōji)
- Sakuya Tachibana (橘 朔也, Tachibana Sakuya): Kousei Amano (天野 浩成, Amano Kōsei) (Played as "Hironari Amano")
- Mutsuki Kamijo (上城 睦月, Kamijō Mutsuki): Takahiro Hōjō (北条 隆博, Hōjō Takahiro)
- Shiori Hirose (広瀬 栞, Hirose Shiori): Yumi Egawa (江川 有未, Egawa Yumi)
- Kotaro Shirai (白井 虎太郎, Shirai Kotarō): Terunosuke Takezai (竹財 輝之助, Takezai Terunosuke)
- Haruka Kurihara (栗原 遥香, Kurihara Haruka): Kaori Yamaguchi (山口 香緒里, Yamaguchi Kaori)
- Young Amane (幼い天音, Osanai Amane): Hikari Kajiwara (梶原 ひかり, Kajiwara Hikari)
- Kei Karasuma (烏丸 啓, Karasuma Kei): Kazuhiro Yamaji (山路 和弘, Yamaji Kazuhiro)
- Junichi Shimura (志村 純一, Shimura Jun'ichi): Yuuki Kuroda (黒田 勇樹, Kuroda Yūki)
- Natsumi Miwa (三輪 夏美, Miwa Natsumi): Yoko Mitsuya (三津谷 葉子, Mitsuya Yoko)
- Shin Magaki (禍木 慎, Magaki Shin): Takao Sugiura (杉浦 太雄, Sugiura Takao)
- Amane Kurihara (栗原 天音, Kurihara Amane): Miku Ishida (石田 未来, Ishida Miku)
- Satoko Kanemitsu (金満 里子, Kanemitsu Satoko): Yoneko Matsukane (松金 よね子, Matsukane Yoneko)
- Fortune Teller (占い師, Uranaishi): Shungicu Uchida (内田 春菊, Uchida Shungiku)
- Wedding Hall Staff (結婚式場スタッフ, Kekkonshikijō Sutaffu): Delcea Mihaela Gabriela (デルチャ・ミハエラ・ガブリエラ, Derucha Mihaera Gaburiera)
- Rider Chips
- Baba (馬場): Masayuki Izumi (泉 政行, Izumi Masayuki; Cameo)
- Hanada (花田): Katsuyuki Murai (村井 克行, Murai Katsuyuki; Cameo)
- Department Store Security Guard (デパートの警備員, Depāto no Keibiin): Mitsuru Karahashi (唐橋 充, Karahashi Mitsuru; Cameo)
- Rouzer Voice: Takeshi Sasaki (佐々木 健, Sasaki Takeshi)
- King Rouzer Voice: Fumihiko Tachiki (立木 文彦, Tachiki Fumihiko)

== Songs ==
Theme song

- "ELEMENTS"
  - Lyrics: Shoko Fujibayashi
  - Composition: Miki Fujisue
  - Composition: Rider Chips, Cher Watanabe
  - Artist: Rider Chips featuring Ricky
  After his performance in "ELEMENTS," Ricky was made Rider Chips' permanent vocalist.
