= Takahiro Hōjō =

Japanese actor

- 北条 隆博
- Born: 小嶋 隆浩 (Takahiro Kojima); 25 May 1986 (age 40); Aichi, Japan
- Occupation: Actor
- Years active: 2000–2013,2015
- Height: 177 cm (5 ft 10 in)

Takahiro Hōjō (北条 隆博, Hōjō Takahiro; born May 25, 1986, in Aichi, Japan) is a Japanese restaurant staff and retired actor. He is known for portraying Mutsuki Kamijo / Kamen Rider Leangle in Kamen Rider Blade. According to his Blade co-star Ryoji Morimoto, Takahiro has retired from his acting career and currently moves to work at a restaurant in Nagoya. However, despite the cases, he reprised his role as Kamen Rider Leangle in Super Hero Taisen GP: Kamen Rider 3, though only providing his voice.

== Filmography ==
=== Televition ===
- Mayonaka wa Betsu no Kao (2002)
- Water Boys (2003) as Chiba
- Kamen Rider Blade (2004-2005) as Mutsuki Kamijo / Kamen Rider Leangle
- Kamen Rider Blade: Missing Ace (2004) as Mutsuki Kamijo / Kamen Rider Leangle
- H2 ~ Kimi to Ita Hibi (2005) as Shūji Sagawa
- Life (2007) as Yūki Sonoda
- Q.E.D. (2009) as Kunihiko Sendagawa
- Drifting Net Cafe (2009) as Takashi Matsuda

=== Video games ===
- Kamen Rider Blade (2004) as Kamen Rider Leangle
- Kamen Rider: Super Climax Heroes (2012) as Kamen Rider Leangle
- Kamen Rider Summon Ride! (2014) as Kamen Rider Leangle
