= Kousei Amano =

Japanese actor

- 天野 浩成
- Born: Hironari Yokosawa (横澤 浩成, Yokosawa Hironari); April 9, 1978 (age 48); Kasugai, Aichi, Japan
- Other name: Hironari Hinagata (Real name)
- Occupation: Actor
- Years active: 1995–present
- Spouse: Akiko Hinagata

Hironari Amano (天野 浩成, Amano Hironari; born April 9, 1978 in Kasugai, Aichi) is a Japanese actor. In 2008 he changed his name to Kousei Amano (天野 浩成, Amano Kōsei), maintaining the kanji in his name. In 2013, he married actress Akiko Hinagata.

== Filmography ==
=== Television ===
Year	Title	Role	Notes
2002	First Love	Kohsaku Nioka	
2003	Good Luck!!	Shimamura Takashi	
2003	Namahoso wa Tomaranai		
2004–2005	Kamen Rider Blade	Sakuya Tachibana / Kamen Rider Garren	
2005	Designer		
2005	Sh15uya	Ginkôin fû no otoko	
2006	Oishii Proposal		
2007	Ai no Uta!		
2007	ChocoMimi	Mimi's father	
2007	Shinjuku Swan		1 episode
2007	Delicious Gakuin	Ken Kodou	
2007	Hyakki Yakosho		
2008	Koi no Kara Sawagi Drama Special Love Stories V		
2008	Shichinin no Onna Bengoshi 2		1 episode
2008	Hisho no Kagami		1 episode
2008	Sasaki Fusai no Jingi Naki Tatakai		3 episodes
2010	Indigo no Yoru		
2012	Great Teacher Onizuka	Yaku Okuchi	1 episode
2011–2012	Kamen Rider Fourze	Kouhei Hayami / Libra Zodiarts	
2023–2024	Ohsama Sentai King-Ohger	Glodi Leucodium	
2026	Kamen Rider ZEZTZ	Sieg / Kamen Rider DAWN	

=== Films ===
Year	Title	Role	Notes
2004	Kamen Rider Blade: Missing Ace	Sakuya Tachibana / Kamen Rider Garren	
2004	My Lover is a Sniper	Policeman	Cameo
2005	Happy Birthday		
2005	min.Jam - Yamanote Desu Game		
2005	Hi! Jack!		
2005	Yurei Yori Kowai Hanashi Vol.2		
2005	Yoshitsune to Benkei		
2006	Prisoner No. 07: Reina		
2007	Wanna be FREE! Tokyo Girl		
2009	Koganeyuki		
2010	Together		
2012	Kamen Rider Fourze the Movie: Everyone, Space Is Here!	Kouhei Hayami / Libra Zodiarts	
2015	Super Hero Taisen GP: Kamen Rider 3	Sakuya Tachibana / Kamen Rider Garren	
2018	Does the Flower Bloom?	Kazuaki Sakurai	
2020	The Dignified Death of Shizuo Yamanaka	Dr. Kobayashi	
2024	Teppen no Ken		

=== Stage ===
Year	Title	Role	Notes
1999	Sailormoon Kaguya Shima Densetsu + Kaiteban	Mamoru Chiba / Tuxedo Kamen	Musical
2010	VitaminX ～Legend Of Vitamin～		

=== Video games ===
Year	Title	Role	Notes
2004	Kamen Rider Blade	Sakuya Tachibana / Kamen Rider Blade	
2008	428: Shibuya Scramble	Shinya Kano	
2012	All Kamen Rider: Rider Generation 2	Sakuya Tachibana / Kamen Rider Garren	
2012	Kamen Rider: Super Climax Heroes	Sakuya Tachibana / Kamen Rider Garren	
2013	Kamen Rider: Battride War	Sakuya Tachibana / Kamen Rider Garren	

=== Music videos ===
Year	Title	Role	Notes
2008	"Sekai wa Sore demo Kawari wa Shinai"	Shinya Kano	Theme song to 428: Shibuya Scramble

== Discography ==
- Eikyu Hozon Ban: Kamen Rider Zen Shudaika Shu (2007)
- Another (2006)
- A day in the life (2005)
- DEPARTURE (2005)
- TV Size! Saishin Kamen Rider Zen Shudaika Shu (2005)
- Kibogaoka (2005)
- Kamen Rider Blade The Last Card Complete Deck (2005)
- Kamen Rider Blade Song Collection (2004)
- Rebirth (2004) Kamen Rider Blade Theme Song

Preceded by Yuuta Enomoto	Mamoru Chiba/Tuxedo Mask in Sailor Moon musicals 1999	Succeeded by Hidemasa Edo
