= Ryoji Morimoto =

Japanese actor (born 1982)

- 森本 亮治
- Born: July 11, 1982 (age 44); Moriguchi, Osaka Prefecture, Japan
- Education: Osaka Municipal Sakuranomiya High School
- Occupation: Actor
- Years active: 2002-present
- Height: 172 cm (5 ft 8 in)

Ryoji Morimoto (森本 亮治, Morimoto Ryōji; born July 11, 1982, in Moriguchi, Osaka Prefecture, Japan) is a Japanese actor who is affiliated with both Artist Box and Fireworks. He graduated from Osaka Municipal Sakuranomiya High School's Physical Education.

== Filmography ==
=== TV series ===
Year	Title	Role	Network	Other notes
2002	Season of the Sun	Takao Omori	TBS	
2003	Sky High	Satoshi Minami	TV Asahi	
2004	Kamen Rider Blade	Hajime Aikawa/Kamen Rider Chalice/Joker Undead/Human Undead /Mantis Undead, Ryo Mikami	TV Asahi	
2005	Attack No. 1	Yuji Mitamura	TV Asahi	
2006	Toritsu Mizusho!	Daichi Nagasawa	NTV	
2008	Aibō	Ryoya Hatori	TV Asahi	Season 6, New Year's Day Special
2009	Meitantei no Okite	Tatsuya Kabekami	TV Asahi	
2019	Kamen Rider Zi-O	Hajime Aikawa/Kamen Rider Chalice	TV Asahi	Episode 29-30

=== Films ===
Year	Title	Role	Other notes
2004	Kamen Rider Blade: Missing Ace	Hajime Aikawa / Kamen Rider Chalice / Joker Undead	
2006	Gigolo Wannabe	Keita	
2008	Kamen Rider Den-O & Kiva: Climax Deka	Kazuma Suzuki	
2009	Gokusen: The Movie	Ryoji Horibe	
2015	Super Hero Taisen GP: Kamen Rider 3	Kamen Rider Chalice (Voice)	
