= Kamen Rider Drive: Surprise Future =

Kamen Rider Drive the Movie Surprise Future
- Theatrical poster

Japanese name
- Kanji: 劇場版 仮面ライダードライブ サプライズ・フューチャー
Transcriptions
- Revised Hepburn: Gekijōban Kamen Raidā Doraibu Sapuraizu Fyūchā
- Directed by: Takayuki Shibazaki
- Written by: Riku Sanjo
- Based on: Kamen Rider Drive by Riku Sanjo
- Starring: Ryoma Takeuchi; Rio Uchida; Yu Inaba; Mackenyu; Taiko Katono; Shota Matsushima; Fumika Baba; Tomoya Warabino
- Cinematography: Koji Kurata
- Edited by: Hiroshi Sunaga
- Music by: Shuhei Naruse; Kōtarō Nakagawa
- Production company: Toei
- Release date: August 8, 2015 (Japan)
- Running time: 63 minutes
- Country: Japan
- Language: Japanese
- Box office: $7.1 million

Kamen Rider Drive the Movie: Surprise Future (劇場版 仮面ライダードライブ サプライズ・フューチャー, Gekijōban Kamen Raidā Doraibu Sapuraizu Fyūchā) is a 2015 Japanese superhero film, serving as the film adaptation of the 2014-2015 Kamen Rider Series television series Kamen Rider Drive. It was released on August 8, 2015, in a double billing with Shuriken Sentai Ninninger the Movie: The Dinosaur Lord's Splendid Ninja Scroll!. The film is written by television series screenwriter Riku Sanjo.

The film features the debut of the protagonist of Kamen Rider Ghost.

== Story ==
A mysterious black car arrives through a wormhole revealing an enigmatic black Kamen Rider that resembles Drive as it dispatches three black shift cars throughout Downtown Tokyo. Two of the shift cars take on Roidmude forms as they hijacked a truck as the mysterious black car showed up with a police car and a monster-like construction vehicle driving from behind.

The next day, Shinnosuke Tomari, Kiriko Shijima and Krim Steinbelt aka "Mr. Belt" are seen cruising in the Tridoron. Shinnosuke takes out an envelope that is specifically given to him and Kiriko by Krim telling him not to open it until August 8. The trio respond to a police dispatch via radio communication as there is sightings of a Roidmude attack near downtown. As the opening title roles, Shinnosuke quickly transform into Kamen Rider Drive and is fighting the Roidmude with Tridoron equipped with the Ride Boosters. He then transforms into Drive Type Formula and is about to finish off the Roidmude until he is interrupted by a mysterious young man dressed in white shouting out to him, "Dad don't fire!" Confused at hearing someone calling him "dad," Shinnosuke tried to ignore the mysterious young man. When all of a sudden, Mr. Belt shouted out in a mysterious rage, "Shoot, SHOOT! Destroy everything!!" This triggered Drive into blasting a power plant causing collateral damage. Kiriko is then joined by her brother, Go Shijima as they try to figure out what is going on. Meanwhile, the Metropolitan Police declares Shinnosuke Tomari as the culprit, and sentenced him to die. The young man stated that he is too late to change the past and so he and Shinnosuke tried to run away knowing that they will be blamed for the incident. The two of them are attacked by the mysterious dark Rider, now revealed as Kamen Rider Dark Drive, who is targeting the young man but suddenly recognizes Drive as the father of Eiji Tomari. Shinnosuke tries to fight off Dark Drive but is having difficulties in battling his evil counterpart because Mr. Belt stated that he can't control the Drive Driver's functions. The mysterious young man appears driving the Tridoron rescuing Shinnosuke and evading the Dark Drive, alike a group of armed S.W.A.T. officers who tried to execute Shinnosuke.

Eiji tries to fix the problem with Mr. Belt, only for being killed by Dark Drive. Later, Chase joins Shinnosuke and Go for fighting the Future Roidmudes, one of them controlling an Astaco, which's destroyed by Chaser over the Booster Ride Crosser. Later, Drive and Mach proceed to fight against Dark Drive, defeating him. But later, Drive again gets out of control due to the problem with Mr. Belt, and almost kills Mach; but Shinnosuke discards the belt, and punches him, getting free from its control, and later destroying it with the Shingou-Ax. At that moment, Eiji comes back again, but he reveals he's actually the Roidmude 108, who after killing Eiji, he took his form, stolen his Drive Driver, and went to the past for fusionating with his other self. He proceeds to transform into Dark Drive, and plans to kill Shinnosuke, who's saved by Chase, who lends him his Mach Driver. Meanwhile, Kiriko tries to prove Shinnosuke's innocence, but the councilman rejects to believing in them.

Later, that night, Shinnosuke, hidden from Dark Drive and the police alike, proceeds to read the letter from Mr. Belt.

That day, Shinnosuke arrives to the place said by Mr. Belt in the letter, and discovers his amazing collection of cars. At that moment, he finds himself with Kiriko, who's desperate for proving his innocence. At that moment, the place is attacked by Dark Drive, and both proceed to escape. Shinnosuke rides the Proto-Tridoron, but its destroyed. Shinnosuke tries to transform using Chaser's Signal Bike, but he can't, forcing him to use the Tridoron Key to transform into Super Deadheat and fighting the Roidmudes, destroying one of them.

Meanwhile, Kiriko arrives at the Tokyo Metropolitan Police Department Headquarters with the evidences about the Roidmude 108, and everybody at the Unit proceed to help Drive, but at that moment, Shinji Koba tries to stop them, arguing that it couldn't contribute to their reputation. By this, enraged to the tears, Kiriko proceeds to confront Koba, telling him about Shinnosuke's personality and duty as an officer. Later, a group of S.W.A.T. Officers come to saving Drive from a Roidmude, as a signal Koba changed of thoughts.

Drive proceeds to arrive the place where 108 tries to revive his past-self. Both transform and start to fight. Meanwhile, when a Roidmude starts an attack, Kamen Rider Ghost appears to destroy it, to the astonishment of Kiriko and Genpachiro.

Drive is defeated by Dark Drive. When he was almost near of killing Shinnosuke, the present-108 appeared. Both iterations of Roidmudes fuse into a single Roidmude known as Paradox, who starts a new Global Freeze, and proceeds to kill Shinnosuke. But Shinnosuke is saved by Go, who fights against Paradox. Later, at that moment, Shinnosuke remembers about the Tridoron Key, and gets an idea; so, he recovers the Future Drive Driver, and, alongside the Tridoron Key, he gets success in reviving Mr. Belt, who actually had this plan on mind. Later, Shinnosuke proceeds to transforming in Drive, for fighting Paradox, but he gets the effect of the Heavy Acceleration. But, at that moment, Kiriko throws him Eiji's Shift Car, saving Shinnosuke, and he proceeds to transforming in Drive Type Special. He fights Paradox again, and after attacking him, he destroys him with a Rider Kick.

Later, with Mr. Belt back again, and himself being exonerated, Shinnosuke is talking with Kiriko about what happened. At that moment, Shinnosuke remembers a thing said by 108 disguised as Eiji about his mother, making Shinnosuke realizing his mother was actually Kiriko, which Shinnosuke thinks it's a joke.

== Production and casting ==
Mercedes-Benz partnered up with the film to create a special Mercedes-AMG GT to serve as Kamen Rider Dark Drive's NexTridoron car.

Mackenyu, son of Sonny Chiba, portrays Eiji Tomari, the son of Shinnosuke Tomari (Ryoma Takeuchi). Although he grew up in the United States, he did watch Kamen Rider as a child, and is excited to be a part of the movie. His uncle, Jiro Chiba, previously portrayed Kazuya Taki during the original Kamen Rider.

== Cast ==
- Shinnosuke Tomari (泊 進ノ介, Tomari Shin'nosuke): Ryoma Takeuchi (竹内 涼真, Takeuchi Ryōma)
- Kiriko Shijima (詩島 霧子, Shijima Kiriko): Rio Uchida (内田 理央, Uchida Rio)
- Chase (チェイス, Cheisu): Taiko Katono (上遠野 太洸, Katōno Taikō)
- Go Shijima (詩島 剛, Shijima Gō): Yu Inaba (稲葉 友, Inaba Yū)
- Rinna Sawagami (沢神 りんな, Sawagami Rinna): Rei Yoshii (吉井 怜, Yoshii Rei)
- Kyu Saijo (西城 究, Saijō Kyū): Kenta Hamano (浜野 謙太, Hamano Kenta)
- Genpachiro Otta (追田 現八郎, Otta Genpachirō): Taira Imata (井俣 太良, Imata Taira)
- Krim Steinbelt (クリム・スタインベルト, Kurimu Sutainberuto), Mr. Belt (ベルトさん, Beruto-san; Voice), Drive Driver Equipment Voice, Narration: Chris Peppler (クリス・ペプラー, Kurisu Pepurā)
- Eiji Tomari (泊 エイジ, Tomari Eiji): Mackenyu (真剣佑, Makkenyū)
- Miku Hanasaki (花咲 未来, Hanasaki Miku): Miwako Kakei (筧 美和子, Kakei Miwako)
- Truckers: Muga Tsukaji (塚地 武雅, Tsukaji Muga; of Drunk Dragon), Kenichi Takahashi (高橋 健一, Takahashi Ken'ichi; of King of Comedy)
- Miku's manager: Taihei Katō (加藤 泰平, Katō Taihei; of TV Asahi announcer)
- Brain (ブレン, Buren): Shota Matsushima (松島 庄汰, Matsushima Shōta)
- Medic (メディック, Medikku): Fumika Baba (馬場 ふみか, Baba Fumika)
- Heart (ハート, Hāto): Tomoya Warabino (蕨野 友也, Warabino Tomoya)
- Shinji Koba (古葉 進次, Koba Shinji): Shingo Yanagisawa (柳沢 慎吾, Yanagisawa Shingo)
- Jun Honganji (本願寺 純, Honganji Jun): Tsurutaro Kataoka (片岡 鶴太郎, Kataoka Tsurutarō)
- Paradox Roidmude (パラドックスロイミュード, Paradokkusu Roimyūdo; Voice): Rikiya Koyama (小山 力也, Koyama Rikiya)
- Kamen Rider Ghost (仮面ライダーゴースト, Kamen Raidā Gōsuto; Voice): Shun Nishime (西銘 駿, Nishime Shun; Uncredited)
- Ghost Driver Equipment Voice: m.c.A.T

== Theme song ==
- "re-ray"
  - Lyrics & Composition: Mitsuru Matsuoka
  - Arrangement: tatsuo (of everset), Shuhei Naruse
  - Artist: Mitsuru Matsuoka EARNEST DRIVE
  The song's title is short for "Reflective Ray".

== 1 Minute Stories ==
Roadshow Commemoration! 1 Minute Stories (公開記念! 1分間ストーリー, Kōkai Kinen! Ippunkan Sutōrī) is a set of short movies to promote the movie that aired following episodes 38-41 of the series. It comprises four episodes and features Eiji Tomari.

1. What Is the Real Intention of Krim Steinbelt? (クリム・スタインベルトの真意はなにか, Kurimu Sutainberuto no Shini wa Nani ka)
2. What Is the World Like in 2035? (2035年の未来はどんな世界なのか, Nisensanjūgo-nen no Mirai wa Donna Sekai na no ka)
3. Who Will Open the Road of Time? (時間の道を開くのはだれか, Jikan no Michi o Hiraku no wa Dare ka)
4. Which Era Did Eiji Tomari Arrive in? (泊エイジはいつの時代にたどり着いたのか, Tomari Eiji wa Itsu no Jidai ni Tadoritsuita no ka)

== Reception ==
Kamen Rider Drive: Surprise Future grossed $7.1 million at the Japanese box office despite the strong competition from Jurassic World, Mission: Impossible – Rogue Nation, Minions and Inside Out.
