= Sanctuary (Japanese TV series) =

2023 Japanese sports drama television series

- Promotional release poster
- Japanese: サンクチュアリ -聖域-
- Genre: Sports drama
- Created by: Kan Eguchi
- Written by: Kanazawa Tomoki
- Directed by: Kan Eguchi; Takeshi Amitani(Sumo Battle Torikumi)
- Starring: Wataru Ichinose; Pierre Taki; Shioli Kutsuna; Shōta Sometani; Hiroki Sumi; Koyuki; Kakuso
- Composer: Hideoki Mogi
- Country of origin: Japan
- Original language: Japanese
- No. of episodes: 8

Production
- Executive producer: Sakamoto Kaata
- Producer: Fujita Daisuke
- Cinematography: Yasushi Naoi (photography); Norifumi Ataka (artworks); Jun Tanaka (lighting)
- Editor: Takeshi Wada
- Running time: 32–65 minutes
- Production company: Slow Tide

Original release
- Network: Netflix
- Release: 4 May 2023 – present

Sanctuary (Japanese: サンクチュアリ-聖域-, Hepburn: Sankuchuari: Seiiki) is a Japanese sports drama television series created by Kan Eguchi that premiered on Netflix on 4 May 2023. The series consists of eight episodes, all first released in May 2023. In August 2026, Tokyo Sports reported that a second season was set to begin production in fall 2026.

The show stars Wataru Ichinose in the role of Kiyoshi Oze, an outspoken and violent young man who joins the world of professional sumo under the shikona, or ring name, Enno for the sake of money. The name of the series was chosen to represent the dohyō, a place where wrestlers bet on their future and which is forbidden to outsiders.

== Synopsis ==
The series portrays a rookie wrestler, Enno, a debt-ridden delinquent who lives in violence and with a broken family, as he tries to make his way in the world of professional sumo. As he is scouted by the master of Ensho stable for his talent and physique, and climbs the ranks only for the money with no interest for sumo, he becomes the target of criticism from the sumo executives for his over-the-top personality and his lack of respect for the traditions of the sport.

== Cast and characters ==
=== Main ===
- Wataru Ichinose as Kiyoshi Oze, an outspoken and violent young man who joins the world of professional sumo under the shikona, or ring name, Enno for the sake of money and fame.
- Pierre Taki as Ensho-oyakata, a toshiyori who used to be an ōzeki under the name Enfu. He recruited Kiyoshi within his stable after he saw his talent during a judo competition.
- Shioli Kutsuna as Asuka Kunishima, a progressive journalist who grew up abroad and finds herself transferred from the political department to the highly confidential sumo correspondents' department.
- Shota Sometani as Shimizu, a fan of sumo who joined the same stable as Kiyoshi. Although he aspires to be a great wrestler, he fails to build weight by eating and shows his limitations as a wrestler during his matches.
- Hiroki Sumi as Shizuuchi, a low-ranking wrestler from Kose stable with a bright future but also perceived as a monster because of his strength and the scar on his face.
- Koyuki as Hana, the wife of Ensho and okami-san at Ensho stable.
- So Kaku as Ryuki, a sekiwake of the prestigious Ryukoku stable. Seen as the "Kakukai Prince", he promotes an ethic in sumo that Kiyoshi upsets.
- Suzuki Matsuo as Inushima-oyakata, a former ōzeki under the name Kenga. He is an ambitious toshiyori who seeks to take over the chairmanship of the Sumo Association at the next elections and a rival of Ensho within the Sumo Association. His relation with him is the illustration of the Japanese expression Ken'en no naka (犬猿の仲), meaning "being like dog (ken/inu) and monkey (en)".

=== Supporting ===
- Tomorowo Taguchi as Tokitsu, the head of Kunishima's Sumo department at the Kanto Shimbun.
- Kitaro as Koji, the father of Kiyoshi. A sushi restaurant earnest owner who, saddled with debt, lost his business.
- Kimiko Yo as Sanae, Kiyoshi's depressed and alcoholic mother who fled the family home after Koji's restaurant went bankrupt.
- Onigiri as Umayama-oyakata, a toshiyori who helps Inushima on his quest to power.
- Akira Nakao as Kumada-oyakata, a toshiyori and current chairman of the Sumo Association.
- Kensho Sawada as Enya, a member of Ensho stable and former komusubi who seeks to regain his lost rank.
- Goro Kishitani as Ryukoku-oyakata, a former yokozuna and an expecting and straight-laced master. Father of Ryuki.
- Nobuko Sendo as Yayoi, mother of Ryuki and ōkami-san at Ryukoku stable.
- Rio Teramoto as Nanami, a lounge girl in a hostess club who takes advantage of Kiyoshi.
- Katsuya Maiguma as Yasui, a sensationalist journalist looking for a scandal in sumo.
- Daichi Kaneko as Murata, the CEO of an IT company who will become Kiyoshi's patron.
- Kazuya Yoshie as Enga, a senior member of Ensho stable who constantly represses Kiyoshi.

== Episodes ==
No.	Title	Directed by	Written by	Original release date	Viewers (millions)
1	"Episode 1"	Kan Eguchi	Kanazawa Tomoki	4 May 2023	N/A
Kiyoshi Oze leads a mediocre life in Moji (Kitakyūshū), Fukuoka Prefecture. He hustles other petty thugs and takes care of his father in a small, old house. His mother, living apart from his father since their divorce and the closing of the family sushi restaurant, accumulates debts, preventing Kiyoshi from saving money. He then decides to join a sumo stable at the invitation of Ensho, a toshiyori who wants to restore his stable to greatness. Meanwhile, Asuka Kunishima, a young journalist who has lived in the United States, is transferred to the sumo news department after conducting an overly critical interview with a politician. While covering a 1,500-year-old sport, she is shocked by the old-fashioned customs and practices that persist in the sumo world. Confronted with rules that are beyond them and projects that are dear to them, the two protagonists decide to persevere in the world of professional sumo.
2	"Episode 2"	Kan Eguchi	Kanazawa Tomoki	4 May 2023	N/A
As Ryuki is promoted to ōzeki, he expresses his desire to see the new generation of wrestlers, led by Shizuuchi, come to the top of sumo to gradually change it. Nevertheless, his father and master harshly reprimands him. In the meantime, Kiyoshi adapts to the training of his stable and is invited by Ogawa, the patron of his stable, to go to a hostess bar with Enga, a wrestler he can't stand. At the bar, he meets hostess Nanami, but the outing was an excuse by his stablemates to throw away his personal belongings. The next day at training he tries to take revenge but fails. However, he gains Asuka's respect for trying. After a date with Nanami, Kiyoshi learns from Hana a short time later that his father, Koji, is in hospital. This episode motivates him and, while training in a park, he meets Shizuuchi, a wrestler who entered professional sumo two months before him.
3	"Episode 3"	Kan Eguchi	Kanazawa Tomoki	4 May 2023	N/A
While Shizuuchi trains at Kose stable and demonstrates that he stands up to even a makuuchi wrestler, Kiyoshi trains against Enya. In order to pay for his father's hospitalization expenses, Kiyoshi decides to sell stolen photos of one of his stablemates (Engaku) to a gay fan who buys them for a high price. However, when Kiyoshi is about to pay the hospital bills, he receives a call from Nanami who offers him a restaurant. Giving in to temptation, Kiyoshi accepts but is robbed of his wallet by Nanami along with all his money. In order to earn back the money thanks to his matches, Kiyoshi trains even harder. Later, his stable master gives him his shikona: Enno (猿桜), with the kanji for 'monkey' (猿) from his Ensho stable and the kanji for 'cherry blossom' (桜) expressing his master's wish that he should mature and bloom, like cherry blossom, on the dohyō. As Kiyoshi's first jonidan match in the May tournament approaches, he meets Shimizu who, having left the stable as a wrestler, has become a yobidashi on the advice of their ōkami-san, Hana. Enno wins his first match but shows arrogance in celebrating his victory in the ring and is reprimanded by his master Ensho. Later, Shizuuchi easily wins his fight in the sandanme division. In the evening, Inushima-oyakata and Umayama-oyakata go to the Ensho stable to demand Enno's retirement.
4	"Episode 4"	Kan Eguchi	Kanazawa Tomoki	4 May 2023	N/A
As Ōzeki Ryuki wins his first match, but he once again faces the displeasure of his father, Ryukoku-oyakata, who is increasingly demanding of him. In the evening, Enno invites himself to the meeting between his master, Inushima-oyakata and Umayama-oyakata. In order to put on a good face, he tries to flatter the toshiyori by asking Inushima if he is a former yokozuna. This was a fatal mistake as Inushima was still resentful of never having been promoted to sumo's highest rank. A failure that he has always blamed on Ensho. As the situation is about to escalate, Hana, the ōkami-san, enters and manages to negotiate for Enno to remain a wrestler by pressing a well-kept secret on Inushima. Later that night Ensho punished Enno by hitting him with a shinai. During the May tournament, both Enno and Shizuuchi scores wins in their respective divisions. On Day 11, Enya gets injured while winning his last match and secures his return to jūryō. On the thirteenth day of the May tournament, Enno is placed against a wrestler from the Umayama stable. In an attempt to discredit Enno, it is understood that the Umayama wrestler makes several false starts. Nevertheless, using several headbutts and throwing his opponent right on his master who was on shimpan duty, Enno manages to win the match and wins the jonidan division. Later, Shizuuchi also manages to win the sandanme tournament and is congratulated backstage by Enno and Ryuki. Shizuuchi, however, shows defiance towards Ryuki. As Enno celebrates his victory at a nightclub with a businessman named Murata, Asuka notices the violence of the social media comments against Enno. On their way home, Murata tells Enno that he will become his patron. Four months later, Shizuuchi is still undefeated (28 wins) and is on the verge of equalling the unbeaten record set by Ryuki (31 wins). While the wrestlers continue to train, Yasui, a sensationalist journalist, seeks to learn about Shizuuchi's past, who allegedly killed his family.
5	"Episode 5"	Kan Eguchi	Kanazawa Tomoki	4 May 2023	N/A
Shizuuchi is not the only wrestler to accomplish feats on the dohyō as Enno also wins the sandanme championship on his own and is at 21 consecutive wins, a feat that promotes him to the rank of makushita. As he flies from victory to victory, Enno shows great arrogance and provokes Enga, who has remained in the sandanme division. Asuka starts working on a story about Enno, but she still finds it hard to admit that she admires him. In the editorial office, she is once again the target of taunts. Enya, on the other hand, missed his return to jūryō following the aggravation of his knee injury and is back in makushita. He is faced with a dilemma: continue sumo wrestling and aggravate his injury at the risk of becoming disabled, or undergo surgery and not be able to get back into the ring. After a night spent with his family, he finally makes the decision to retire after the next tournament. Meanwhile, Murata pushes Enno to a game of dares and brings up the idea of "purchasing the sumo world". The next day, the shimpan who decide on the matchups decide to have him face Shizuuchi on Inushima's recommendation. During training, Enno accidentally injures Enya. In the hospital, Enya begs the doctor to let him fight Shizuuchi. Shizuuchi defeats Enya and wins his twenty-ninth consecutive victory and Enno feels guilty about it. Yasui confronts Shizuuchi about his past and against all odds, asks him to lose to Enno in his next match.
6	"Episode 6"	Kan Eguchi	Kanazawa Tomoki	4 May 2023	N/A
The match between Enno and Shizuuchi is getting a lot of attention as both wrestlers are undefeated since their debut. Despite Yasui's request, Shizuuchi fights hard and wins with his tsuppari strikes which break Enno's teeth and pull out his right ear. His injuries were so severe that he had to be evacuated from the dohyō. To everyone's surprise, Shizuuchi pulls out of the tournament, with only one win away from equalling the record for consecutive wins set by Ryuki. Yasui goes to the Ryukoku stable and accuses Ryuki of orchestrating the match-fixing attempt. But now convinced that it was Ryukoku who planned the match, Yasui decides to shadow him and convinces the editor of a tabloid magazine to help him with his investigation. Yasui is eventually trapped by a patron of the Ryukoku stable named Ito, who pressures him by threatening his daughter and his ex-wife. In reality Yayoi, the ōkami-san at Ryukoku stable, is acting behind the scenes to ensure a bright future for her son. While Enno returns to the Ensho stable, he loses his usual mood, traumatised by his fight against Shizuuchi. Enno cuts ties with Murata. This is when Umayama stable offers a degeiko to Ensho stable. During the ensuing training Enno is humiliated as he is still in shock from his fight against Shizuuchi. Meanwhile, Shizuuchi (whose real name is Kunihiko) goes to his home village in Rausu, Hokkaido and recalls his childhood with his abusive and alcoholic mother.
7	"Episode 7"	Kan Eguchi	Kanazawa Tomoki	4 May 2023	N/A
Ryukoku, who has discovered the truth, confronts Yayoi in the presence of Ryuki and sends her away. Ensho is summoned to Kumada-oyakata, the chairman of the Sumo Association because during the degeiko Enno assaulted one of Umayama's wrestlers who had provoked him. Enno is therefore dismissed. Asuka tries to change Inushima's mind without success but Hana calls in a favour owed to her by Ryukoku. The latter managed to convince Inushima to suspend Enno rather than dismiss him. Enno discovers that Nanami was having an affair with Murata and decides to break up. Motivated by Sanae, Enno decides to continue sumo and starts training harder. His mood also changes and he becomes humble and conscientious. At the same time Shizuuchi remembers his mother's suicide after she killed his little brother.
8	"Episode 8"	Kan Eguchi	Kanazawa Tomoki	4 May 2023	N/A
Enya holds his danpatsu-shiki at Ensho stable. Both Enno and Shizuuchi prepare for their return to the ring during the January tournament. Both have been demoted because they did not fight in the last tournament and are supposed to compete in the sandanme division. From day one Enno and Shizuuchi are announced as opponents. They fight, and the screen cuts to black as they collide.

== Production ==
=== Development ===
The series is the first collaboration between Kan Eguchi and Kanazawa Tomoki since Riding Uphill in 2018. Director Kan Eguchi began working on a series centred on professional sumo after the release of The Fable in 2019. He described the series was first and foremost conceived to put forward the story of young wrestlers in clash of desire, ego, and stubbornness that can be seen in professional sumo "by peeling off [the] thin skin [of the sport]" and the "soul-shaking" master-student relationship wrestlers develop throughout their career. During the audition process for the wrestlers, a hundred or so actors were selected and put through a series of physical tests to ensure that only actors who were both physically fit and able to follow the training in real-life situations were retained.

In order to prepare for the roles, the entire cast playing wrestlers underwent more than a year of thorough physical transformation under the guidance of Hollywood experts and Olympic athlete trainers and nutritionists, and engaged in more than six months of sumo training under the supervision of former jūryō wrestler Ishinriki Kōji. The series is also the first filming experience for several former professional wrestlers, among them Kensho Sawada (formerly known under his shikona of Chiyonoshin), a former makushita wrestler from Kokonoe stable and older brother of Chiyonokuni. Although he owns a restaurant, he still auditioned for the role thinking it would be good publicity for his business.

=== Filming ===
Production of the film began with the renting of Toho studio facilities in Setagaya, Tokyo. This was the first time Netflix established a production base in Japan as part of a strategy to develop original live-action works.

According to the Yomiuri Shimbun, Kan Eguchi asked Wataru Ichinose for a different acting style, focusing on "mental armour" to set him apart from other actors playing wrestlers. Eguchi also forbade Ichinose to interact with the other actors and members of the technical team before certain scenes.

== Reception ==
The series got off to a popular start, ranking first in Japan's "Today's Series TOP 10" for five days in a row, ranked 6th in Netflix's weekly global TOP 10 (non-English series), and was ranked #1 in "Today's Series" in more than 50 countries and regions around the world. The series is regularly compared to the film Sumo Do, Sumo Don't and the Disney+ series that rebooted it since these works are among the most popular adaptations of sumo on television and cinema. The reboot series itself was aired 7 months before Sanctuary. The series has also been compared to Heels or GLOW, in that it shows what goes on behind the scenes of an extremely opaque sport.

The series' discourse was criticised in the Shukan Shincho, suspecting it of sportswashing by underplaying the impact of the physical and psychological violence endured by the wrestlers by categorising them as "necessary evils." In the same newspaper, researcher Ryō Aizawa also warns about the way the series looks at the preservation of professional sumo traditions, considering reprehensible behaviour as part of a whole with sport. He also criticises the series' portrayal of sport as "prejudicial", presenting it as "a relic of a bygone era". Tokyo Weekender also criticised the series for its lack of criticism of sumo, in particular for regularly portraying Asuka Kunishima (Shioli Kutsuna) as a "nuisance who needs to shut up."

In international reviews, media columnist James Hardfield described the series as an "anticlimactic sumo bout", ending abruptly after colossal efforts. He regrets that the series struggles to take off and loses itself throughout its first half in Kiyoshi's "boorish antics". The second half of the season is also criticised for its acceleration, leaving many subplots abandoned. Nevertheless, the series is also known for its very satisfying training and tournament scenes and the detail with which the rituals are portrayed. Collider also criticises the series for its desire to be both a comedy and to tackle the serious subjects of sport, never finding a balance and giving the impression of being both overstretched and underdeveloped. Sports journalist and sumo columnist John Gunning highlighted the series lack of correlation with the reality of professional sumo mentioning scenes where characters bite, punch, give the middle finger in interviews and disrespect superiors. However he also praised the series’ entertainment value and "Quentin Tarantino-esque feel".

The series did not go unnoticed by those involved in professional sumo, not least the chairman of the Japan Sumo Association, Hakkaku. On the occasion of the commemoration of his sixtieth birthday, the former yokozuna criticised the former wrestlers appearing in the series for the weakness of the training shown on screen. He acknowledged, however, that the series offered a gateway for most viewers, and expressed his satisfaction at the opportunity it provided to spread sumo, particularly abroad.

On 14 May 2023, a statue of Enno was installed at Ryōgoku Station, not far from the Ryōgoku Kokugikan, in preparation for the sumo summer tournament.

== See also ==
- Heels, an American show with a similar premise involving wrestling as the main focus.
- Hinomaru Sumo, a manga/anime with Sumo as the main focus.
