= Taiko Katono =

Japanese actor and model (born 1992)

- Born: October 27, 1992 (age 33); Sendai, Miyagi Prefecture, Japan
- Occupations: Actor, Model
- Years active: 2011 - present
- Height: 171 cm (5 ft 7 in)
- Children: 1

Taiko Katono (上遠野 太洸, Katōno Taikō; born October 27, 1992) is a Japanese actor and model who was affiliated with Evergreen Entertainment. He left the agency in March 2019 after 8 years and is now a freelancer. He is best known for his role as the character, Chase/Mashin Chaser/Kamen Rider Chaser from the Kamen Rider series Kamen Rider Drive.

== Early life ==
Katono was born in Sendai, Miyagi Prefecture, Japan. While in high school Katono entered the 23rd Junon Super Boy Contest. At the final selection meeting, he was awarded the Grand Prix from among the 5,132 applicants.

== Career ==
In March 2011, Katono's debut in the compilation album Tokyo Ragga Lovers2 as a jacket model. In the same year in May, his acting debut in raising army performance came alongside the Junon Super Boy Contest. He appeared in television dramas, films, and stage plays. In 2012, Katono was selected in the magazine The Television Zoom!! Vol. 7 The Year the Expectation of the U-22 Actor as number one.

In 2014, he starred in the Japan tour of New York City's transvestite ballet Grand Diva. He had no ballet experience and received training in New York for the role.

== Personal life ==
On July 20, 2024, Katono announced his marriage to actress and former Kamen Joshi member Misa Kubota. On December 18, 2024, he announced his son's birth.

== Filmography ==
=== TV series ===
Year	Title	Role	Network	Other notes
2011	Hanazakari no Kimitachi e	Nao Kawachimori	Fuji TV	
2012	Shiawase no Jikan	Ryosuke Asakura	Tōkai TV	
2013	35-sai no Koukousei	Ryota Otake	NTV	
2014	Kamen Rider Drive	Chase (Koichi Kano)/Mashin Chaser/Proto Zero/Kamen Rider Chaser	TV Asahi	
2014	The File Of Young Kindaichi Neo	Uosumi	NTV	Episode 7
2019	Kamen Rider Zi-O	Chase/Mashin Chaser	TV Asahi	Episode 47–48
2020	Akudama Drive	Execution Division Junior	AT-X	Episode 8–12

=== Films ===
Year	Title	Role	Other notes
2012	Kyō, Koi o Hajimemasu		
2013	Little Maestra	Masaya Ono	
2014	Gaki Rock	Gen Shimura	Main Role
2014	Kamen Rider × Kamen Rider Drive & Gaim: Movie War Full Throttle	Chase/Mashin Chaser	
2015	Super Hero Taisen GP: Kamen Rider 3	Mashin Chaser (Voice)	
2015	Kamen Rider Drive: Surprise Future	Chase/Kamen Rider Chaser	
2015	Kamen Rider × Kamen Rider Ghost & Drive: Super Movie War Genesis	Chase/Kamen Rider Chaser	
