= Ringo no Kuni no Jona =

Japanese manga series

- First tankōbon volume cover

林檎の国のジョナ
- Manga
- Written by: Arare Matsumushi
- Published by: Shogakukan; Futabasha
- Imprint: Action Comics
- Magazine: Monthly Big Comic Spirits; (September 27 – November 27, 2023); Web Comic Action; (June 14, 2024 – present)
- Original run: September 27, 2023 – present
- Volumes: 2

Ringo no Kuni no Jona (林檎の国のジョナ) is a Japanese manga series written and illustrated by Arare Matsumushi. It was initially serialized in Shogakukan's seinen manga magazine Monthly Big Comic Spirits from September to November 2023. After disagreements between Matsumushi and the magazine's editorial board, the series was transferred to Futabasha's Web Comic Action manga website in June 2024.

== Synopsis ==
The series focuses on Alice Kato, a 25-year-old woman who is insecure about her appearance and name. After leaving her parents' home in Saitama, she moves to Aomori to stay close to her relatives and meets a man named Masaichi. Masaichi's presence gives Alice comfort that she's never experienced before.

== Publication ==
Written and illustrated by Arare Matsumushi, Ringo no Kuni no Jona was initially serialized in Shogakukan's seinen manga magazine Monthly Big Comic Spirits from September 27 to November 27, 2023. After disagreements between Matsumushi and the magazine's editorial board, the series was transferred to Futabasha's Web Comic Action on June 14, 2024. Its chapters have been collected in two tankōbon volumes as of October 2025.

No.	Release date	ISBN
1	November 28, 2024	978-4-575-44067-6
2	October 23, 2025	978-4-575-44100-0
3	November 26, 2026	978-4-575-44137-6

== Reception ==
The series was ranked seventh in the 2026 edition of Takarajimasha's Kono Manga ga Sugoi! guidebook's list of the best manga for female readers. The series won the 5th Crea Late Night Manga Award in 2026.

== See also ==
- Takahashi from the Bike Shop, another manga series by the same creator
