= Accomplishment of Fudanshi Bartender =

Japanese manga series

- Cover of vol. 1 of the Japanese version, released on April 25, 2019

腐男子バーテンダーの嗜み (Fudanshi Bātendā no Tashinami)
- Genre: Comedy, slice of life
- Manga
- Written by: Naruko
- Published by: Ichijinsha
- Imprint: Zero Sum Comics
- Magazine: Zero Sum Online
- Original run: October 19, 2018 – present
- Volumes: 2
- Television drama
- Directed by: Junya Ikeda
- Produced by: Masahiko Asakura; Kōichi Tezuka
- Written by: Junya Ikeda
- Studio: Hakuhodo DY Media Partners
- Licensed by: GagaOOLala
- Original network: Fuji TV
- Original run: May 31, 2022 – May 31, 2022
- Episodes: 2
- icon

Accomplishment of Fudanshi Bartender (Japanese: 腐男子バーテンダーの嗜み, Hepburn: Fudanshi Bātendā no Tashinami) is a Japanese manga series by Naruko. It was serialized in the josei digital manga magazine Zero Sum Online since October 19, 2018.

A live-action television drama adaptation was broadcast on Fuji TV and its online streaming service, Fuji TV On Demand, on May 31, 2022.

== Plot ==
Sōichirō Hibiki works as a bartender in Shōnan, where he is known to be mysterious and cool. However, he is secretly a fanatical otaku and fudanshi (a fan of boys' love) who spends the daytime drawing boys' love doujinshi, watching anime, and buying anime goods. At his bartender job, he observes and imagines wild, fantastical scenarios of his male patrons and co-workers falling in love.

== Characters ==
Sōichirō Hibiki (響 惣一郎, Hibiki Sōichirō)
Voiced by: Kōsuke Kiminarita (voice comic), Portrayed by: Takuma Wada
Hibiki is a skilled bartender who maintains a cool appearance in public. He is secretly an otaku and fudanshi who often daydreams scenarios about his male patrons and co-workers falling in love. He bases his characters in his boys' love doujinshi on his customers.
Kanemitsu Hakushū (白州 兼三, Hakushū Kanemitsu)
Voiced by: Shouhei Tokiwa (voice comic), Portrayed by: Takeshi Masu
Referred to as "manager" (店長, tenchō), he is the owner of the bar.
Hokuto (北杜)
Voiced by: Maiko Akahoshi (voice comic), Portrayed by: Miona Hori
Hokuto is a part-time apprentice bartender who is in love with Hibiki. She is a masochist and gets excited when Hibiki is cruel to her. She was given the first name Yuri (百合) in the television drama adaptation.
Yūto Chita (知多 悠斗, Chita Yūto)
Portrayed by: Kenta Suga
Chita is a young and recent hire at the bar. Hibiki initially suggests to Hakushū to hire a male bartender in order to give Hakushū a love interest; however, after Hibiki determines both Hakushū and Chita are uke, he dedicates himself into finding a "prince charming" for Chita instead.
Torii (鳥井, Torī)
Voiced by: Yūto Ishida (voice comic), Portrayed by: Tomohisa Yuge
A frequent patron of the bar, Torii is a manager of a company. Hibiki ships him with Yamazaki as his "OTP".
Yamazaki (山崎)
Voiced by: Junichi Kuroi (voice comic), Portrayed by: Masaki Nakao
A frequent patron of the bar, Yamazaki is Torii's young subordinate. Hibiki ships him with Torii.
Obuchizawa (小淵沢)
Portrayed by: Kazuhiro Yamaji
Nicknamed Buchi (ブッチー, Bucchī), Obuchizawa is Hakushū's childhood friend who cares a lot about him. Hibiki ships him with Hakushū.
Hibiki's older sister
Hibiki's older sister is a popular doujinshi artist who publishes comics under the pen name Shōko Kotsushō (骨粗鬆 症子, Kotsushō Shōko).
Chihiro Kubota (久保田 千尋, Kubota Chihiro)
Kubota is Hibiki's good-looking classmate from high school. Kubota has started to become casually interested in anime and video games and befriends Chita.
Unnamed patron
A patron of the bar, he is enchanted by Hibiki and often attempts to seduce him, despite Hibiki trying to set him up with the manager. He and Hokuto see themselves as rivals for Hibiki's affections. He is bisexual and has a sadistic personality.

== Media ==
=== Manga ===
Accomplishment of Fudanshi Bartender was written and illustrated by Naruko. It is serialized in the josei digital manga magazine Zero Sum Online since October 19, 2018. The chapters were later released in two bound volumes by Ichijinsha under the Zero Sum Comics imprint. To promote it, Monthly Comic Zero Sum released a voice comic adaptation of the first chapter on their YouTube channel.

No.	Japanese release date	Japanese ISBN
1	April 25, 2019	978-4758034234
2	April 25, 2020	978-4758035064

=== Television drama ===
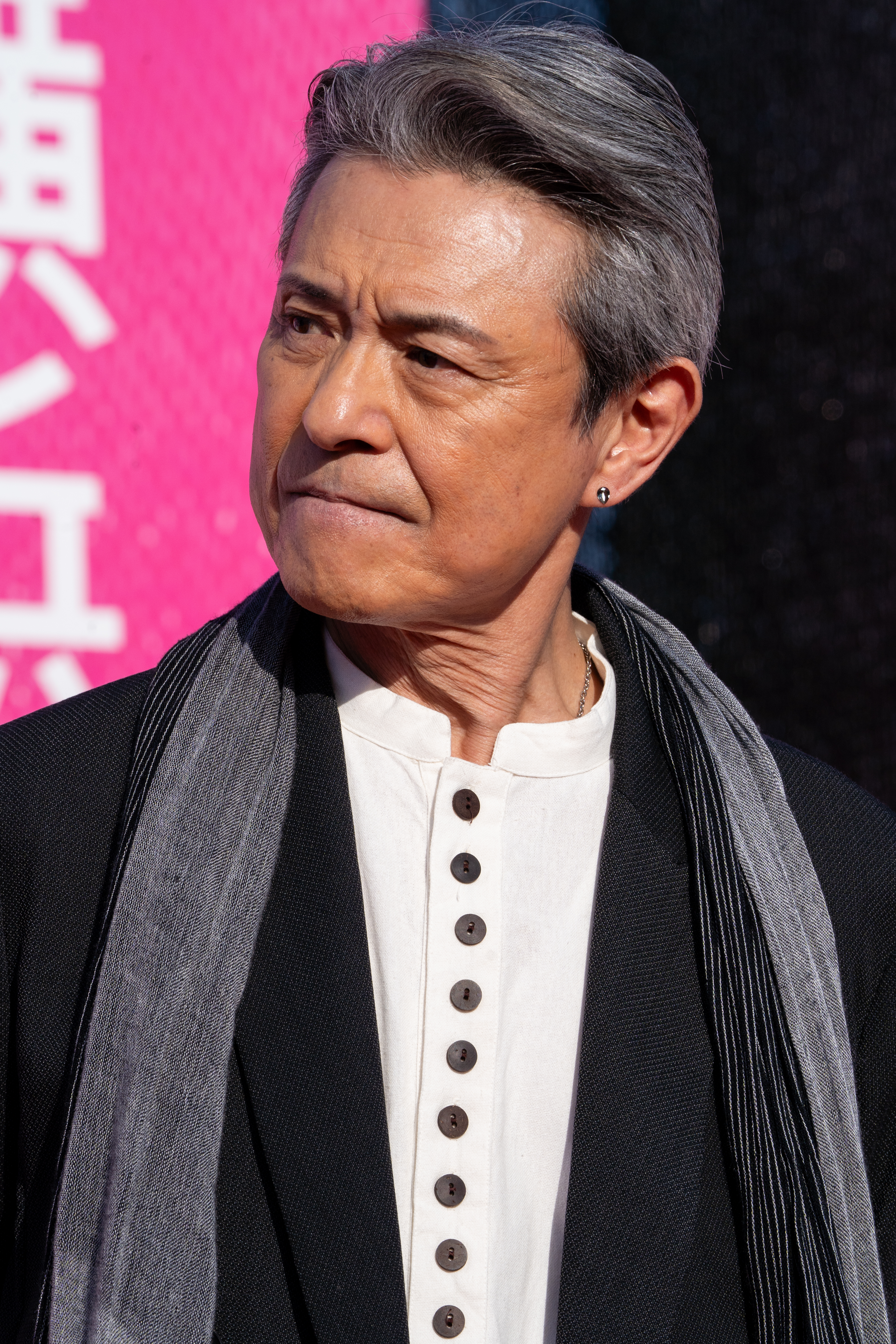
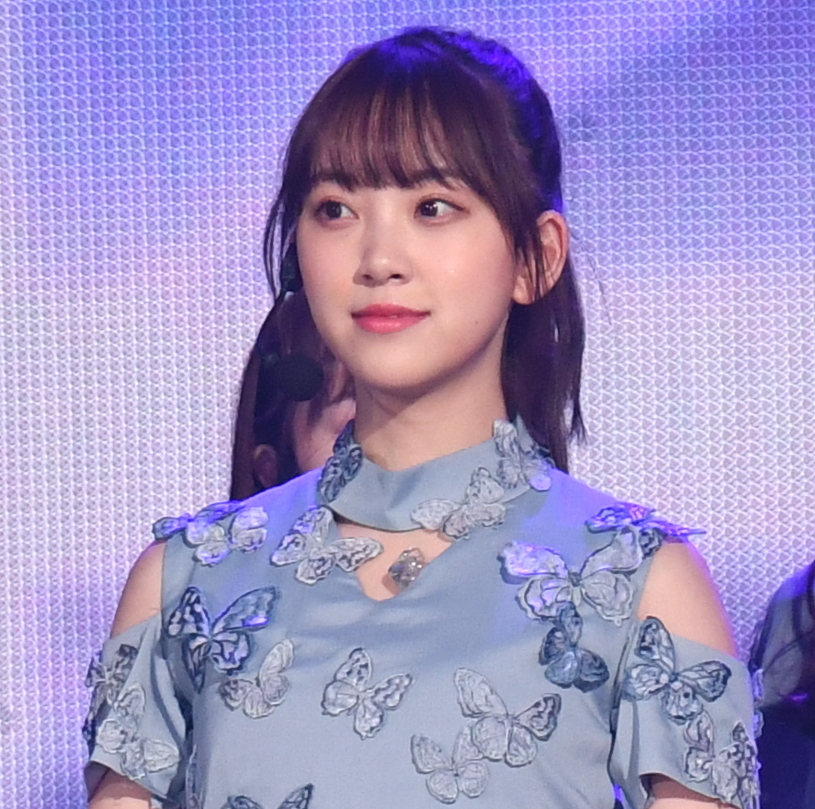
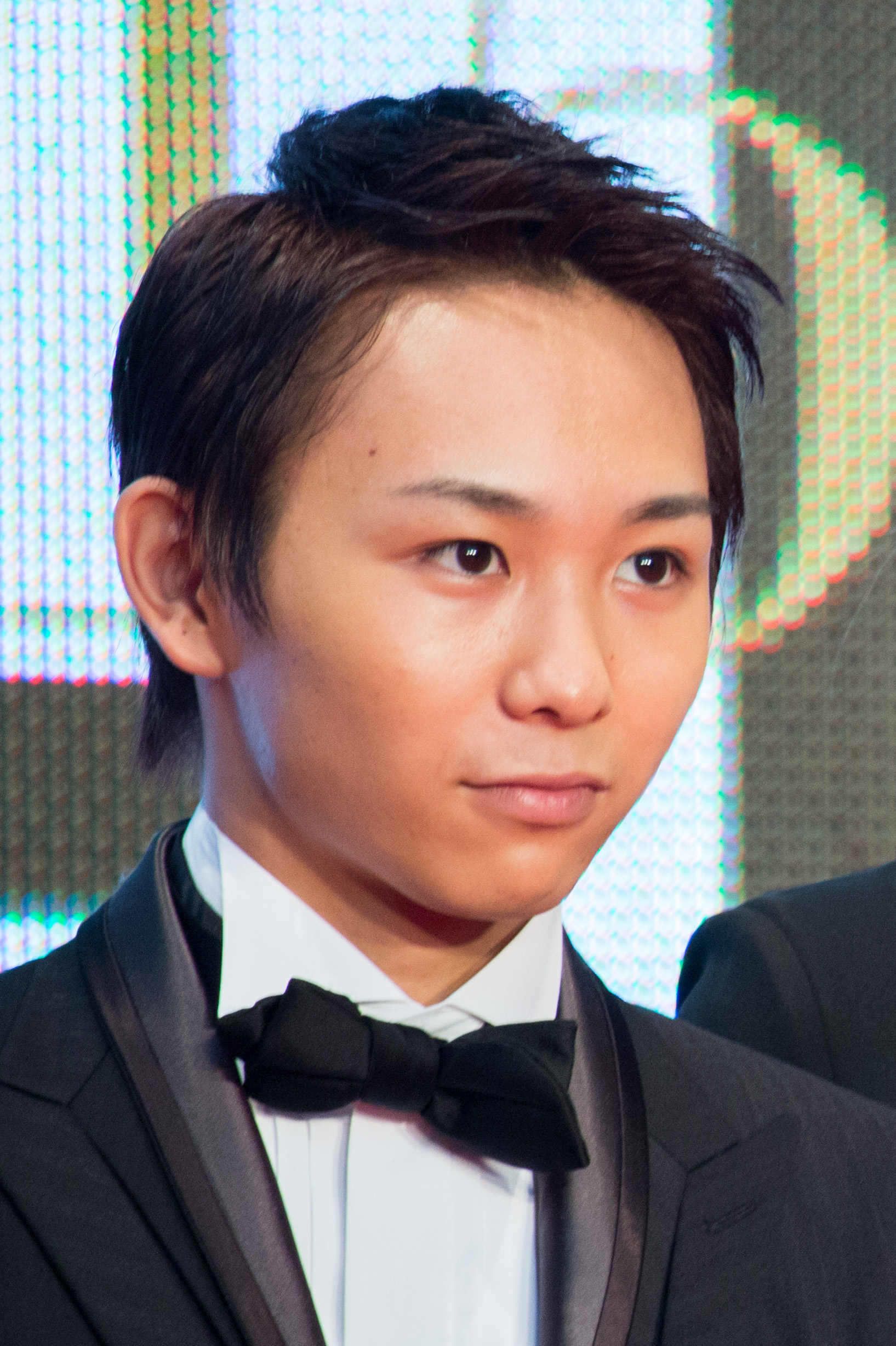
(From left to right) Takeshi Masu (2024), Miona Hori (2019), and Kenta Suga (2015) appeared in the 2022 live-action drama adaptation.

A live-action television drama adaptation of Accomplishment of Fudanshi Bartender was produced by Hakuhodo DY Media Partners. It premiered on WakuWaku Japan in Taiwan in December 2021. It was later broadcast in Japan on May 31, 2022, on Fuji TV for their M Night programming block, (Note: Fuji TV lists the broadcast date as May 30, 2022, at 26:20, which is May 31, 2022, at 2:20 AM.) as well as their online streaming service, Fuji TV On Demand, for a total of two episodes. It was streamed internationally outside of Japan and South Korea through GagaOOLala.

The series stars Takuma Wada as Hibiki. The supporting cast includes Takeshi Masu as Hakushū, Miona Hori as Hokuto, and Kenta Suga as Chita. Additional cast appearances include Tomohisa Yuge as Torii, Masaki Nakao as Yamazaki, Kazuhiro Yamaji as Obuchizawa, Shogo Suzuki as Iwai, and Shota Matsushima as Taketsuru. The television drama adaptation is directed and written by Junya Ikeda. It was produced by Masahiko Asakura and Kōichi Tezuka. Ikeda stated on his Twitter account that he was interested in producing a sequel for the series.

==== Episodes ====
No.	Title (Note: All English titles are taken from GagaOOLala.)	Directed by	Written by	Original release date
1	"Order 01: A Certain Bartender's Secret"; Transliteration: "Order 01: Toaru Bātendā no Himegoto" (Japanese: Order01「とあるバーテンダーの秘め事」)	Junya Ikeda	Junya Ikeda	May 31, 2022
2	"Order 02: Your Destined Pair"; Transliteration: "Order 02: Unmei no Tsugai" (Japanese: Order02「運命のつがい」)	Junya Ikeda	Junya Ikeda	May 31, 2022

== Reception ==
Da Vinci stated that people who have "the experience of having a bias" will "empathize with Hibiki's actions and feelings" and recommended the manga to anyone who has been an idol fan or part of the boys' love fandom.
