= Chris Peppler =

Japanese-American radio personality

- クリス・ペプラー
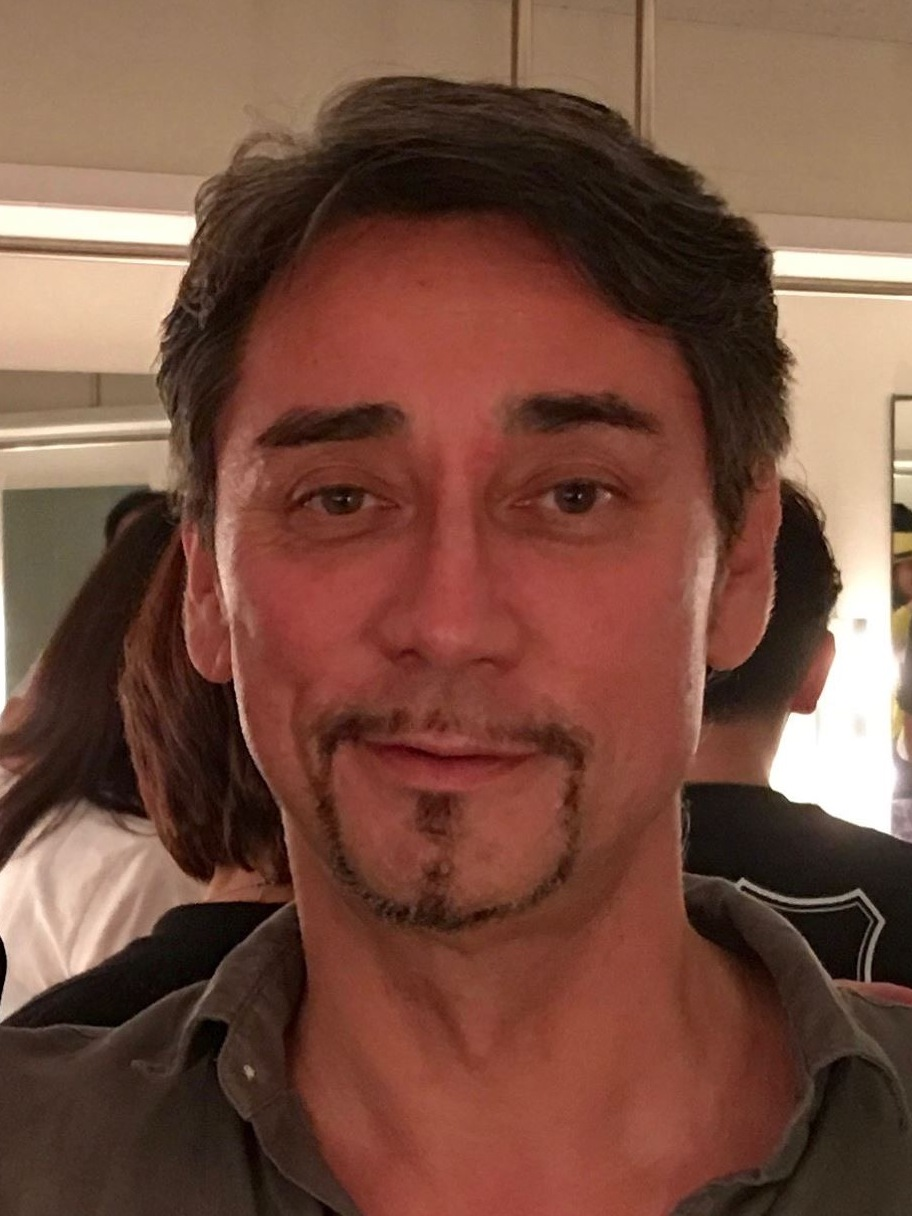
- Born: Christopher Daniel Peppler; October 22, 1957 (age 68); Tokyo, Japan
- Occupation: Radio personality
- Spouse: Yukari Kimijima (2006 - )
- Relatives: Alan J (Alan John Peppler) (brother)
- Website: Official website

Christopher Daniel Peppler (born October 22, 1957, in Tokyo, Japan), simply known as Chris Peppler (クリス・ペプラー, Kurisu Pepurā), is a Japanese-American radio personality.

Peppler is a navigator for J-Wave's Tokio Hot 100 and the host of Tokyo Eye 2020.

== Personal life ==
Peppler was born to a German-American father and a Japanese mother in Seibo Hospital. There isn't any Japanese in his name due to the request of his mother, who wanted to name her son Chris. Through his grandmother, he is a descendant of Akechi Mitsuhide.

After graduating from St. Mary International School, he moved to California. He later moved back to Japan to begin his DJ career. Shortly after in 2006, he met and married fellow DJ Yukari Kimishima.

He is also fluent in French as his third language.

== Filmography ==
=== Radio and TV series ===
- J-Wave

Title	Notes
Tokio Hot 100	
Otoajito	
Rock Alive	
Night Stories	navigator for Tuesday
Future Trax	
J's Calling	
Tokyo Eye 2020	host

- NHK

Year	Title	Role	Notes
2006	Eigo de Shabera Night		
	World Premium Live		Navigator
	Tokyo Eye		English broadcast program navigator
	Godzilla Umiwowataru Sekai Seiha e no Scenario		Narrator
	Kaze ni Maiagaru Vinyl Sheet	Ed	Acting debut
	Akiba no Kyūjitsu		
	Romes / Kūkō Bōgyo System		Narrator
2010	Yōgaku Club 80's		Guest
2010	37th Japan Prize Award Ceremony "Kagayake! Kyōiku Content Sekaiichi"		Moderator
2011	NHK Special "Sekai o Kaeta Otoko Steve Jobs"		Navigator
2012	Angela Aki no Song Book in English		Moderator
2012	Asadora Satsujin Jiken	Multi-channel fairy	

- Nippon TV

Title	Notes
Minna no TV	
Pride & Spirit Nihon Pro-Yakyu	Sub-audio track DJ

- Tokyo Broadcasting System

Title	Notes
Niji-ciao!	
Discovery of the World's Mysteries	Semi-regular respondent

- TV Asahi

Title	Role	Notes
Tamori Club		
Moero! Atlanta-ō		Navigator
Kamen Rider Drive	Krim Steinbelt / Mr. Belt, Roidmude #004, Narration	
Shuriken Sentai Ninninger vs. Kamen Rider Drive: Spring Break Combined 1 Hour Special	Mr. Belt (voice)	

- Tokyo MX

Title	Notes
Saturday Live	MC
Weekend Hips	MC

- BS Asahi

Year	Title	Notes
2010	DeLonghi presents "Bono Espresso"	Navigator

- Fox Network

Title	Notes
American Idol	Facilitator in Japan

=== Advertisements ===
Title	Notes
Konami Sound trademark	
Intel	
Pacific Residence	
ExxonMobil	

=== Video games ===
Year	Title	Role	Notes
1994	Formula One World Championship: Beyond the Limit	Commentary, Commercial narration of circuit course	
1999	Cookie's Bustle	Narrator	
1999	Crazy Taxi	Gus	Re-releases on later platforms
2002	Nichibeikan Pro-Yagu Final League		
2014	Kamen Rider Battle: Ganbarizing	Mr. Belt	
2014	Kamen Rider Summonride!	Mr. Belt	

=== Anime ===
Year	Title	Role	Network	Notes	References
2014	Space Dandy	Flower Rock Hoshi-jin	Tokyo MX		

=== Films ===
Year	Title	Role	Notes
2014	Miracle Debikuro-kun no Koi to Mahō		
2014	Kamen Rider × Kamen Rider Drive & Gaim: Movie War Full Throttle	Krim Steinbelt, Mr. Belt	
2015	Super Hero Taisen GP: Kamen Rider 3	Mr. Belt (voice)	
2015	Kamen Rider Drive: Surprise Future	Krim Steinbelt, Mr. Belt	
2015	Kamen Rider × Kamen Rider Ghost & Drive: Super Movie War Genesis	Mr. Belt (voice)	
2016	Kamen Rider Heisei Generations : Dr. Pac-Man vs. Ex-Aid & Ghost with Legend Riders	Krim Steinbelt, Mr. Belt	
2019	Kamen Rider Zi-O the Movie: Over Quartzer	Krim Steinbelt	

=== Musicals ===
Title	Role	Notes
Anri Summer Farewells Cafe 25 Vingt Cinq	DJ	
M-Flo Expo Bōei Robot Gran Sonik Cosmicolor Cafe 25 Vingt Cinq	Interlude narrator	
Kome Kome Club Mata(C)Tana	DJ	Special guest
Tomoyasu Hotei Guitarhythm V	Narration	

=== Others ===
Year	Title	Role
2013	The 53rd Miss International Beauty Pageant 2013	Host
