= Shōta Matsushima =

Japanese actor (born 1990)

Shota Matsushima
- 松島 庄汰
- Born: December 26, 1990 (age 35); Amagasaki, Hyōgo Prefecture, Japan
- Occupation: Actor
- Years active: 2009–present
- Agent: Amuse, Inc.
- Height: 1.80 m (5 ft 11 in)
- Website: Official profile at Amuse

Shōta Matsushima (松島 庄汰, Matsushima Shōta; born December 26, 1990 in Amagasaki, Hyōgo Prefecture, Japan) is a Japanese actor. He is currently under contract with Amuse, Inc.

== Filmography ==
=== TV series ===
Year	Title	Role	Network	Notes	Ref.
2009	GodHand Teru		TBS		
2010	Q10		NTV		
2011	Hanazakari no Kimitachi e (2011)	Masafumi Katsura	Fuji TV		
2012	Resident 5-nin no Kenshui	Makoto Hasegawa	TBS		
2014	Yoru no Sensei	Lulu Sanjo	TBS	Episode 6	
2014	Kamen Rider Drive	Brain / Brain Roidmude / Mitsuharu Kineta	TV Asahi		
2014	The Empress of China	Motsube Amamori	Hunan Television	Episode 11	
2019	Kamen Rider Brain	Brain	Web episodes	2 Episode	
2019	Sherlock: Untold Stories	Yohei Tsuzaki	Fuji TV	Episode 10	
2022	Accomplishment of Fudanshi Bartender	Taketsuru	Fuji TV	Episode 2	

=== Films ===
Year	Title	Role	Notes	Ref.
2010	Softboys			
2010	Ohoku	Tomoya Wakatsuki		
2011	Drucker in the Dug-Out	Daisuke Niimi		
2014	Kujira no Ita Natsu	J		
2014	Kamen Rider × Kamen Rider Drive & Gaim: Movie War Full Throttle	Brain / Brain Roidmude		
2015	Ao Oni ver.2.0	Takuro		
2015	Kamen Rider Drive: Surprise Future	Brain		
2015	Kamen Rider × Kamen Rider Ghost & Drive: Super Movie War Genesis	Brain / Brain Roidmude		
2023	As Long as We Both Shall Live	Kensuke Miyata		
