= Taira Imata =

Japanese actor

- 井俣 太良
- Born: September 24, 1975 (age 50); Aichi Prefecture, Japan
- Occupation: Actor
- Agents: Shōnen Shachu; Ace Agent

Taira Imata (井俣 太良, Imata Taira; born September 24, 1975) is a Japanese actor who is represented by the talent agencies Shōnen Shachu and Ace Agent.

== Biography ==
Taira went to Toho Koto Gakko in Nagoya, Aichi Prefecture, and was later a member of the Waseda University Theatre Research Society (also known as Gekken). He founded the troupe Shōnen Shachu with Nobuhiro Mori. He was also later affiliated with Ace Agent.

== Filmography ==
=== TV series ===
Year	Title	Role	Network	Notes
2014	Kamen Rider Drive	Genpachiro Otta	TV Asahi	

=== Films ===
Year	Title	Role	Notes
2014	Kamen Rider × Kamen Rider Drive & Gaim: Movie War Full Throttle	Genpachiro Otta	
2015	Super Hero Taisen GP: Kamen Rider 3	Genpachiro Otta, Cheetah Snail (voice)	
2015	Kamen Rider Drive: Surprise Future	Genpachiro Otta	
