= Nicole Fujita =

Japanese model (born 1998)

- 藤田 ニコル
- Born: 20 February 1998 (age 28); Milford, Auckland, New Zealand
- Occupations: Model; tarento
- Years active: 2009–present
- Agent: Oscar Promotion
- Height: 167 cm (5 ft 6 in)
- Spouse: Yu Inaba (m. 2023)

Nicole Fujita (藤田 ニコル, Fujita Nikoru; born 20 February 1998) is a New Zealand-born Japanese model and tarento. She is represented by the talent agency Oscar Promotion and is currently active in Tokyo. She is an exclusive model for the fashion magazine ViVi.

== Career ==
In 2012, Fujita won the 13th Nicola Model Audition, then became an exclusive model for that magazine. She switched to the magazine Popteen from the July 2014 issue. In April 2015, she was appointed as a fashion reporter for the news magazine show Mezamashi TV. The same year she was the most searched new model on Yahoo! Japan and won a special award for it. In July 2016, she made her drama debut in Fuji Television's spin-off drama Suki na Hito ga Irukoto: Sama Sama Kyun Kyun Daisakusen, playing the lead role. She made her debut as a singer on August 3, 2016.

In August, 2017, Fujita left Popteen and joined Vivi as one of their exclusive models just 2 months after. The following year, she voice acted in the anime, Pokémon: Sun & Moon. She appeared in over 330 TV programs in 2017.

Her own fashion brand NiCORON was launched in 2018.

On February 23, 2019, Fujita started her YouTube channel. She began uploading videos in August of the same year and has over 500,000 followers as of September, 2019.

In March 2024, to commemorate the 65th anniversary of International Women's Day, Fujita was one of a number of female celebrities had their likeness turned into Barbie dolls.

== Personal life ==
She was influenced by late 2000s / early 2010s era Popteen models (such as Kumiko Funayama). She is of Polish and Russian descent on her father's side.

In August 2023, she married actor Yu Inaba.

In December 2025, she announced her pregnancy.

== Discography ==
=== Singles ===
- Bye Bye (3 August 2016, Sony Music)

== Appearances ==
=== Film ===
- You Are Mine! (2024)
- My Special One (2025), herself

=== Television ===
- Is There a Vet in the House? (NTV, 2014) as a guest appearance
- Pokémon the Series (Sun & Moon Season 3, voice roles), Female Pikachu (Kurin) (EP93), Stufful (since EP96)

=== Web dramas ===
- Suki na Hito ga Irukoto: Sama Sama Kyun Kyun Daisakusen (Fuji TV on demand, 2016)

=== Commercials ===
- Datsumō Labo (2016)

=== Music videos ===
- Sonar Pocket - Hero/Good Bye Taisetsu na Hito. (2015)

=== Events ===
- Shizuoka Collection (2015 A/W)
- Tokyo Girls Collection (2015 A/W, 2016 S/S)
- Girls Award (2015 A/W, 2016 S/S)

== Bibliography ==
=== Magazines ===
- Nicola, Shinchosha 1997-, as an exclusive model from 2009 to April 2014
- Popteen, Kadokawa Haruki Corporation 1980-, as an exclusive model since June 2014

=== Books ===
- Nikorun Desu (Kadokawa Haruki Corporation, 1 December 2015) ISBN 9784758412742

== Awards ==
- Nicola Model Audition (2009): Grand Prix
- Yahoo! Japan Search Award 2015: Won (Model Category)
