= Little Maestra =

- DVD cover
- Directed by: Toshiro Saiga
- Written by: Riko Sakaguchi
- Produced by: Osamu Fujita; Kaori Otsuka; Takahiro Sunazuka
- Starring: Kasumi Arimura; Yumiko Shaku; Matsu (Exile)
- Cinematography: Takahiro Hyakusoku
- Edited by: Satoko Obara
- Music by: Ryō Utasato
- Distributed by: Argo Pictures
- Release date: 1 December 2012 (Japan)
- Running time: 108 minutes
- Country: Japan
- Language: Japanese

Little Maestra (Japanese: リトル・マエストラ) is a 2012 Japanese film directed by Toshiro Saiga.

== Plot ==
It is set in a small fishing village in Shika municipality, Ishikawa Prefecture, who depend on the local amateur orchestra as their favorite source of entertainment. When the conductor dies unexpectedly, the townspeople recruit the man's granddaughter, a high school student with a talent for conducting.

The song "Land of Hope and Glory" features in the movie.

== Cast ==
- Kasumi Arimura as Misaki Yoshikawa
- Yumiko Shaku as Midori Mimura
- Keizo Kanie as Genji Arasawa
- Mariko Tsutsui as Youko Isaka
- Eisuke Sasai as Iwao Ono
- Taiko Katono Masaya Ono
- Matsu (Exile) (Toshio Matsumoto) as Masaru Arasawa
- Gin Maeda as Tatsuji Minatogawa, aka Tatsu-jiji
- Michiyoshi Inoue as Maestro Orfenstein
- Hisahiro Ogura as Hiroshi Taniguchi

== Release ==
It got an early release at select theaters in Ishikawa Prefecture on December 1, 2012, and was then released theatrically throughout Japan on February 1, 2013. The DVD was released in Japan on August 23, 2013.
