= Gaki Rock =

Manga series and live-action film

ガキ☆ロック (Gaki Rokku)
- Manga
- Written by: Daiju Yamauchi
- Published by: Akita Shoten
- Magazine: Young Champion
- Published: 2003
- Volumes: 1
- Live-action film
- Directed by: Yūji Nakamae
- Written by: Kōki Yamamoto
- Released: June 28, 2014

Gaki Rock (ガキ☆ロック, Gaki Rokku; "Brat Rock") is a Japanese manga written and illustrated by Daiju Yamauchi. It was adapted into a live action film in 2014.

== Characters ==
- Gen Shimura (Taiko Katono)
- Makoto (Kōki Maeda)
- Jimmy (Yōsuke Kawamura)
- Mattsun (Ryōji Nakamura)
