= Takahashi from the Bike Shop =

Japanese manga series

- First tankōbon volume cover

自転車屋さんの高橋くん (Jitenshaya no Takahashi-kun)
- Genre: Romance
- Manga
- Written by: Arare Matsumushi
- Published by: Leed Publishing
- English publisher: NA: Yen Press
- Imprint: Torch Comics
- Magazine: Torch Web
- Original run: April 3, 2019 – present
- Volumes: 9
- Television drama
- Directed by: Isamu Ohta; Fuga Yaegashi; Hisayoshi Yamashita
- Produced by: Isamu Ohta; Kyohei Morinaga; Kazuhiro Goto
- Written by: Ayako Kitagawa
- Studio: LesPros Entertainment
- Original network: TV Tokyo
- Original run: November 3, 2022 – December 22, 2022
- Episodes: 8
- icon

Takahashi from the Bike Shop (自転車屋さんの高橋くん, Jitenshaya no Takahashi-kun) is a Japanese manga series written and illustrated by Arare Matsumushi. It began serialization on Leed Publishing's Torch Web manga website in April 2019. A live-action television drama adaptation aired from November to December 2022.

== Characters ==
Tomoko Hanno (飯野朋子, Hanno Tomoko)
Portrayed by: Rio Uchida
Ryōhei Takahashi (高橋遼平, Takahashi Ryōhei)
Portrayed by: Nobuyuki Suzuki

== Media ==
=== Manga ===
Written and illustrated by Arare Matsumushi, Takahashi from the Bike Shop began serialization on Leed Publishing's Torch Web manga website on April 3, 2019. Its chapters have been collected into nine tankōbon volumes as of September 2025.

In August 2024, Yen Press announced that they had licensed the series for English publication beginning in January 2025.

No.	Original release date	Original ISBN	North American release date	North American ISBN
1	November 22, 2019	978-4-8458-6033-3	January 21, 2025	979-8-8554-0445-6
Chapter 1-8; Bonus Comic: Miwa-kun and Takahashi-kun
2	May 22, 2020	978-4-8458-6057-9	May 27, 2025	979-8-8554-0447-0
Chapter 9-14; Bonus Comic: Sayo-chan and Takahashi-kun; Bonus Comic: In a World Where They Were Dating a Decade Earlier...; Bonus Comic: Miwa-kun, Takahashi-kun, and Mom
3	January 22, 2021	978-4-8458-6074-6	October 28, 2025	979-8-8554-0449-4
Chapter 15-20; Bonus Comic: Takahashi-kun Hits the Big City; Extra: Behind the Scenes During Chapter 17; Afterword
4	August 27, 2021	978-4-8458-6100-2	May 26, 2026	979-8-8554-0451-7
5	May 26, 2022	978-4-8458-6124-8	December 15, 2026	979-8-8554-0453-1
6	February 24, 2023	978-4-8458-6153-8	—	—
7	November 24, 2023	978-4-8458-6605-2	—	—
8	November 28, 2024	978-4-8458-6773-8	—	—
9	September 30, 2025	978-4-8458-6979-4	—	—

=== Drama ===
A live-action television drama adaptation was announced on August 10, 2022. The drama aired on TV Tokyo from November 3 to December 22, 2022, starred Nobuyuki Suzuki and Rio Uchida in lead roles, and featured Rio Teramoto, Mari Hamada, and others in supporting roles.

== Reception ==
The first volume featured a recommendation from manga artist Peko Watanabe.

The series was ranked tenth in the Nationwide Publishers' Recommended Comics of 2021. The series was ranked thirteenth in the 2022 edition of Takarajimasha's Kono Manga ga Sugoi! guidebook list of the best manga for female readers. The series was nominated for the 15th Manga Taishō and was ranked 10th with 32 points.

By July 2023, the series had over 1.5 million copies in circulation.

== See also ==
- Ringo no Kuni no Jona, another manga series by the same creator
