= Rio Uchida =

Japanese actress and gravure idol (born 1991)

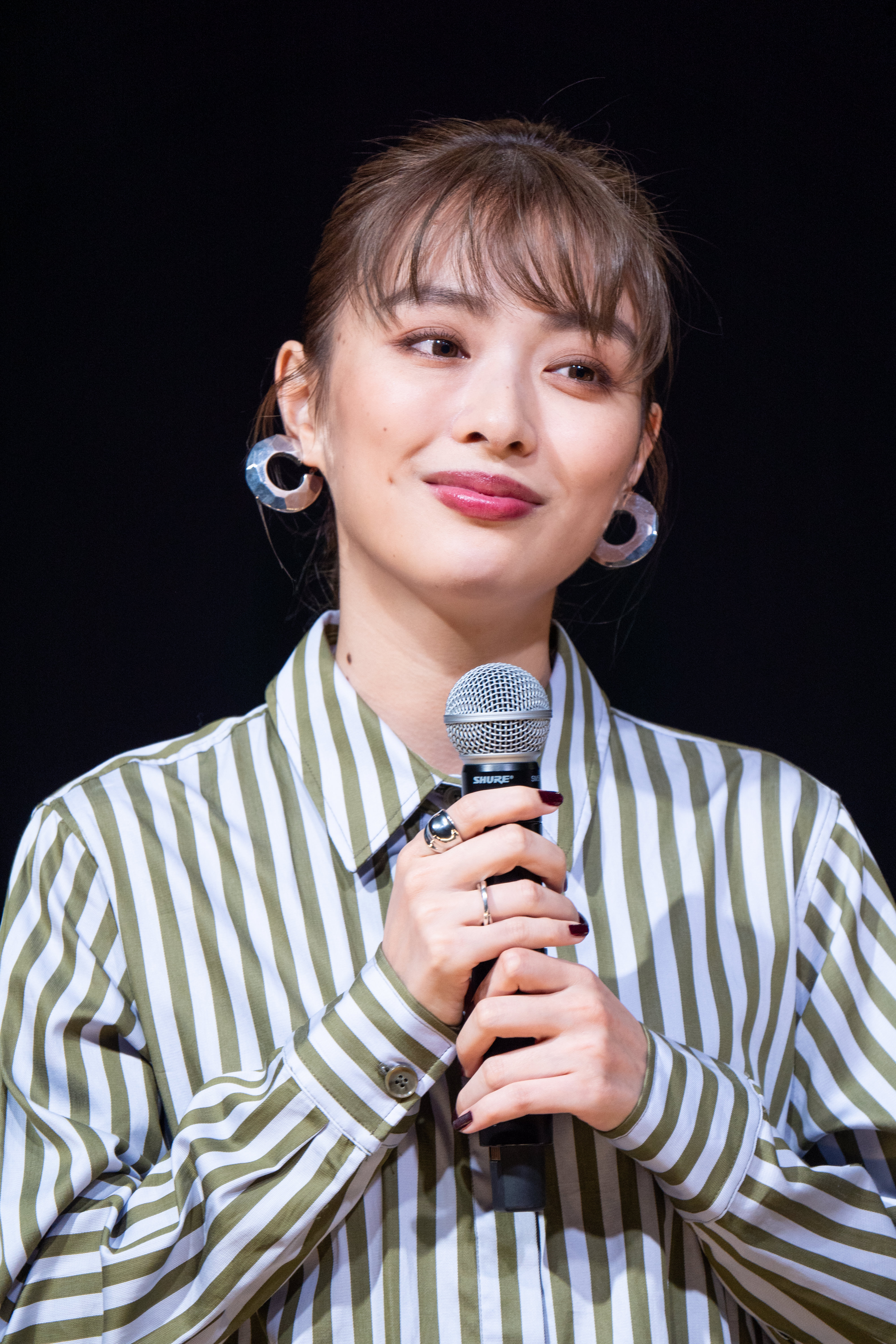
- Uchida in 2019
- Born: September 27, 1991 (age 35); Hachiōji, Tokyo, Japan
- Occupations: Gravure idol; Actress
- Years active: 2010–present

Rio Uchida (内田 理央, Uchida Rio; born September 27, 1991, in Hachiōji, Tokyo, Japan) is a Japanese actress and gravure idol who is affiliated with LesPros Entertainment. She is best known for her role as Kiriko Shijima, the main heroine of the Kamen Rider series Kamen Rider Drive.

== Biography ==
Uchida debuted in April 2010. In June 2010, she was selected at the NTV Transgenic 2010. In September 2010, Uchida was a member of Beautiful Lady & Television's BLTravel Fan Event Bust Tour non-certified office unit that was formed in the wake LesPros Entertainment. On November 27, 2013, she was chosen for the selection members of the office certified LesPros Entertainment events Vol.1 to be held on January 25, 2014. On March 21, 2014, Uchida was selected to the regular member one graduating class of the theater company Matsumoto Kazumi. From October 2014, she starred in the TV Asahi tokusatsu series, Kamen Rider Drive as the main heroine, Kiriko Shijima.

== Filmography ==
=== TV series ===
Year	Title	Role	Other notes	Ref.
2013	Public Affairs Office in the Sky	Guest		
2014–15	Kamen Rider Drive	Kiriko Shijima		
2015	Okitegami Kyōko no Bibōroku	Makuru Makuma		
2017	Tomodachi Game	Shiho Sawaragi	Lead role	
2017	Meals Shogi Player Loved	Nayuta Tōge	Lead role	
2018	Princess Jellyfish	Mayaya		
2018–24	Ossan's Love	Chizu Arai	3 seasons	
2021	Thus Spoke Kishibe Rohan	Naoko Osato	Episode 6	
2022	Takahashi from the Bike Shop	Tomoko Hanno	Lead role	
2024	1122: For a Happy Marriage	Young woman at a bar		

=== Film ===
Year	Title	Role	Other notes	Ref.
2014	Kamen Rider × Kamen Rider Drive & Gaim: Movie War Full Throttle	Kiriko Shijima		
2015	Super Hero Taisen GP: Kamen Rider 3	Kiriko Shijima		
2015	Kamen Rider Drive: Surprise Future	Kiriko Shijima		
2015	Mr.Maxman	Rina Igarashi		
2015	Kamen Rider × Kamen Rider Ghost & Drive: Super Movie War Genesis	Kiriko Shijima		
2016	Chimamire Sukeban Chainsaw	Gīko Nokomura	Lead role	
2016	Kamen Rider Drive Saga: Chaser	Kiriko Shijima		
2018	The Name			
2018	It's Boring Here, Pick Me Up	Akane Morishige		
2018	That Girl's Captives of Love			
2019	Ossan's Love: The Movie	Chizu Arai		
2020	Masked Ward	Sasaki		
2021	Remain in Twilight			
2021	Rika: Love Obsessed Psycho			
2022	Whisper of the Heart	25-year-old Yūko Harada		
2023	Undercurrent	Mina Fujikawa		

== Awards and nominations ==
Year	Award	Category	Work(s)	Result	Ref.
2019	22nd Nikkan Sports Drama Grand Prix	Best Supporting Actress	Ossan's Love	Won	
