= Rio Teramoto =

Japanese actress and gravure model (born 2001)

- 寺本 莉緒
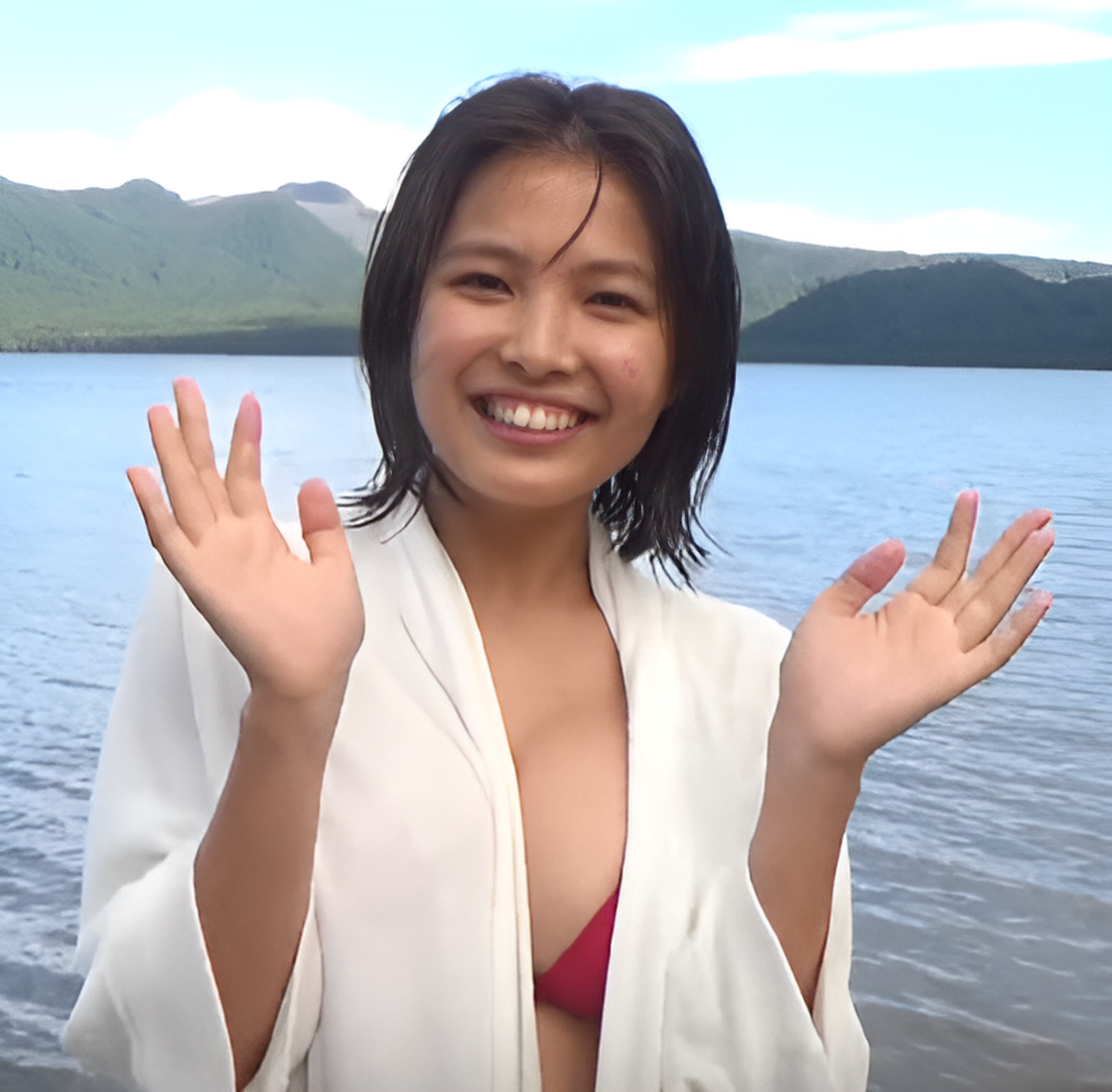
- Teramoto in 2019
- Born: 5 November 2001 (age 24); Hiroshima City, Hiroshima Prefecture, Japan
- Other names: Riorio (りおりお); Rārio (らーりお)
- Occupations: Actress; gravure model
- Years active: 2015–present
- Modeling information
- Height: 154 cm (5 ft 1 in)
- Hair color: Black
- Eye color: Brown
- Agency: Meteora
- Website: www.fansnet.jp

Rio Teramoto (寺本 莉緒, Teramoto Rio; born 5 November 2001) is a Japanese actress and gravure model.

== Biography ==
Teramoto was born on 5 November 2001 in Hiroshima City, Hiroshima Prefecture. She has two older brothers. Her hobbies include dancing and playing the piano, she began dancing at 3 years old and playing the piano at 5. Teramoto did her first modeling as a child, saying it inspired her to continue pursuing it as a career.

== Career ==
After the "Dream Girl Audition 2015" competition, Teramoto was signed to the LesProsEntertainment talent agency. She worked promoting other performers at the 2016 Tokyo Idol Festival. In 2017, Teramoto worked on a various theatrical productions, including a role in Fiddler on the Roof. In 2018, she entered the "Miss Magazine" contest, which was revived for the first time in 7 years, taking the runner-up "Miss Young Magazine" title while being called "The Treasure of the Next Generation of Weekly Young Magazine." Along with the other nine contest finalist, Teramoto formed the Miss Magazine Theater Company, putting on a stage version of the popular manga Are You Lost? for which she cut her hair.

Teramoto attended AICJ Junior High school and High School in Hiroshima for much of her education but decided to transfer schools and move to Tokyo for career. She did appear in a 2019 episode of the television show Koi toka Ai toka (恋とか愛とか（仮）) filmed at the school before her departure. That same year, a private swimsuit photo of Teramoto posted to social media went viral, attracting attention in Japan and abroad and dramatically raising her online profile. The attention earned her first of many appearances in Weekly Playboy.

On 1 March 2020, her first photo book, Curiosity, was released, the same month she graduated high school. The photo shoots were done in Los Angeles, Teramoto's first visit to the United States. Teramoto said, "[The book] was completely self-produced, and I made it with particular attention to costumes, makeup, and how it looks!" The book was the number one book in the "Women's Talent Photobook Sales Ranking" by the end of the month and had already exceeded four reprints by July of that year. She entered college in April 2020 but, as of early 2021, had yet to attend classes due to the COVID-19 pandemic.

Teramoto is a baseball fan and supporter of the Hiroshima Toyo Carp, saying in an interview that Ryosuke Kikuchi is her favorite player. She eats up to 15 cups of ramen a week. Her nominal measurements according to her official profile are 88G-60-88 cm (35G-24-35 in).

On July 1, 2025, Teramoto announced the expiration of her contract with LesPros Entertainment. In September 13, in an interview with Kodansha, she expressed her desire to resume gravure modeling after being on hiatus. In October of the same year, she shared on her Instagram that she had joined the agency Meteora. In early 2026, she announced the release of her second gravure photo book to mark the fifth anniversary of the first.

== Filmography ==
=== Film ===
| Year | Title | Role | Notes | Ref. |
|---|---|---|---|---|
| 2020 | We're Not Friends | Ema Shirota | Lead role | |
| 2022 | Ah, The Pasture is so Green | Hana | Lead role | |
| 2026 | Tokyo Strayers | Asuka | Lead role | |

=== Television drama ===
| Year | Title | Role | Notes | Ref. |
|---|---|---|---|---|
| 2021 | Girl Gun Lady | Bianca | | |
| 2021 | Women's War: The Bachelor Murders | Rio Ichinose | | |
| 2021 | Welcome to Toei Murder Studio | Kaho | Web series | |
| 2022 | Tonight, I Will Fall in Love with My Body | Akari Kurata | Episode 2 | |
| 2022 | Chatter About Love | Yui Meri | | |
| 2022 | Takahashi from the Bike Shop | Sayuri Kawamura | | |
| 2023 | Shuojo Love | Rio Komachi / Riopi | Web series | |
| 2023 | Sanctuary | Nanami | | |
| 2023 | Subscription Girlfriend | Na-chan | | |
| 2023 | Something's Wrong 2 | Erika Takamiya | Episode 7 | |
| 2023 | The Best Teacher | Kurumi Nakazono | Web series | |
| 2023 | Mr. Mitazono the Housekeeper | Mao Funaki | | |
| 2023 | The Truth | as Herself | | |
| 2024 | RoOT/Route of Odd Taxi | Kanon | | |
| 2024 | The Song of the Outcast | Mai Sakuma | Web series | |
| 2024 | Shinjuku Field Hospital | Ririka | | |
| 2024 | Qros's Woman: Madness Called Scoop | Mona | Episodes 1 & 10 | |
| 2024 | Omusubi | Asuka Ōkōchi | Asadora | |
| 2025 | Kaze no Fukushima | Mayu | Episode 12 | |
| 2026 | Share | Nene Tsukaji | | |
| 2026 | Return The Gift | Yoshiko Muto | Web series | |
| 2026 | First Cry | Asuka Sanada | | |

== Bibliography ==
=== Photo book ===
- 1st photo book "Curiosity" (March 25, 2020, Kodansha)
