= Tomoya Warabino =

Japanese actor

- 蕨野 友也
- Born: August 4, 1987 (age 38); Miyakonojō, Miyazaki Prefecture, Japan
- Occupation: Actor
- Years active: 2006–present
- Agent: A-Team
- Height: 187 cm (6 ft 2 in)
- Website: www.ateam-japan.com

Tomoya Warabino (蕨野 友也, Warabino Tomoya; born August 4, 1987, in Miyakonojō, Miyazaki Prefecture, Japan) is a Japanese actor who is represented by the talent agency, A-Team. He is best known for his roles in various Tokusatsu shows such as Heart in Kamen Rider Drive and Ultraman Blazar's main character, Gento Hiruma.

== Biography ==
Warabino graduated from Miyazaki Prefectural Miyakonojō Technical High School. He debuted in 2006. In the year-end special of All-Star Thanksgiving, Warabino won the "Akasaka 5-chrome Mini Marathon" during his first appearance. On September 22, 2010, he was appointed as ambassador of Miyazaki Prefecture and served until March 31, 2012.

== Filmography ==
=== TV series ===
Year	Title	Role	Network	Notes
2007	First Kiss	Takeo Shohata	Fuji TV	
2010	Kurohyō: Ryū ga Gotoku Shinshō			
2012	Teen Court: 10-dai Saiban	Toru Shinohara	NTV	
2014–15	Kamen Rider Drive	Heart / Heart Roidmude / Businessman	TV Asahi	
2015	Masshiro	Tetsuro Suenaga	TBS	Episode 4
2018	Segodon	Ebihara Shigekatsu	NHK	Taiga drama
2023–24	Ultraman Blazar	Gento Hiruma	TV Tokyo	

=== Films ===
Year	Title	Role	Notes
2009	Crows Zero II	Hayato Shibayama	
2009	Gokusen: The Movie	Tomoya Wakatsuki	
2010	Real Gonigokko 2	Akira Sato	
2011	Keibetsu	Satoru Yokota	
2011	Miss Boys! Kessen wa Kōshien!? Hen	Shigeru Sakurai	
2012	Miss Boys! Yūjō no Yukue-hen	Shigeru Sakurai	
2013	A Story of Yonosuke		
2014	Kamen Rider × Kamen Rider Drive & Gaim: Movie War Full Throttle	Heart / Heart Roidmude	
2015	Good Stripes	Yamon	
2015	Kamen Rider Drive: Surprise Future	Heart	
2015	Kamen Rider × Kamen Rider Ghost & Drive: Super Movie War Genesis	Heart / Heart Roidmude	
2024	Ultraman Blazar The Movie: Tokyo Kaiju Showdown	Gento Hiruma	
