= Shigenori Yamazaki =

Japanese actor and voice actor

- 山崎 樹範
- Born: February 26, 1974 (age 52); Tokyo, Japan
- Occupations: Actor; voice actor
- Years active: 1995–present
- Spouse: Rei Yoshii (m. 2016)

Shigenori Yamazaki (山崎樹範, Yamazaki Shigenori; born February 26, 1974 in Tokyo, Japan) is a Japanese actor and voice actor. He has been married to actress Rei Yoshii since November 11, 2016.

== Filmography ==
=== Film ===
- Kōfuku no Alibi (2016)
- Hibana: Spark (2017)

=== Television drama ===
- Densha Otoko (2005)
- Last Friends (2008), Tomohiko Ogura
- Totto-chan! (2017), Kiyoshi Atsumi
- Kamen Rider Geats (2022), Chirami
- Silent (2022), Yoshihiko Koga

=== Television animation ===
- Eureka Seven (2005) as Dominic Sorel
- Medabots (xxxx) as Iwanoi
- Ouran High School Host Club (xxxx) as Kazukiyo Souga (ep 21)
- Sadamitsu the Destroyer (xxxx) as Kuron
- The Prince of Tennis (xxxx) as Satoshi Horio

=== Original video animation ===
- The Prince of Tennis: A Day on Survival Mountain (xxxx) as Satoshi Horio
- The Prince of Tennis: The National Tournament (xxxx) as Junpei Horio; Satoshi Horio
- Time Stranger Kyoko (xxxx) as Subordinate A

=== Stage ===
- Prince of Tennis Live (xxxx) as Satoshi Horio

=== Radio ===
- SCHOOL OF LOCK! (TOKYO FM/JFN)

=== Dubbing ===
- The Sorcerer's Apprentice, Dave Stutler (Jay Baruchel)
