= Takeshi Masu =

Japanese actor (born 1955)

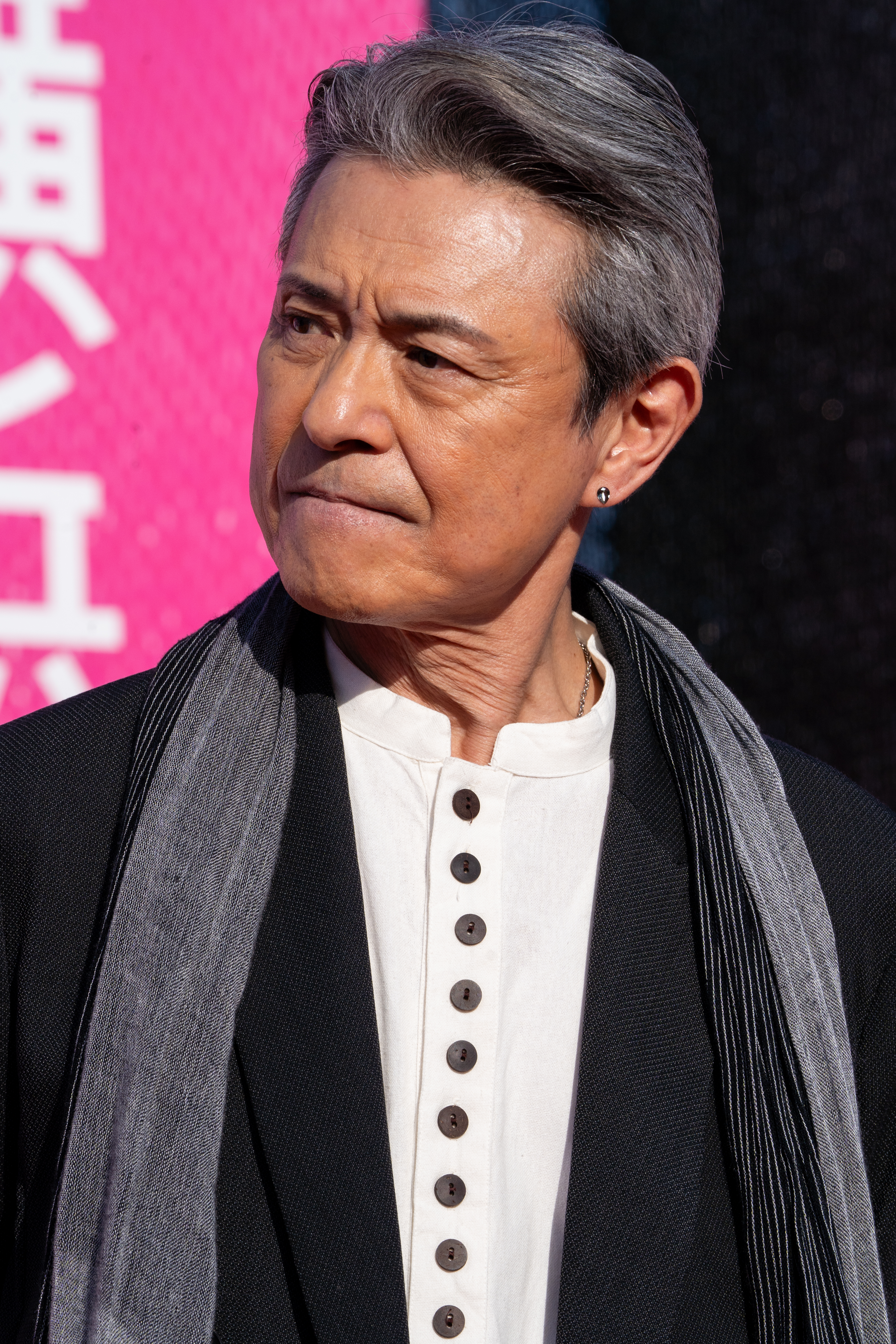
- Born: 9 December 1955 (age 70); Tokyo, Japan
- Occupation: Actor
- Years active: 1975–present

Takeshi Masu (升毅, Masu Takeshi; born December 9, 1955) is a Japanese actor. He appeared in more than 80 films since 1981.

== Filmography ==
=== Film ===
| Year | Title | Role | Notes | Ref. |
|---|---|---|---|---|
| 1981 | Gaki Teikoku | Ashita no Joe | | |
| 2016 | A Sower of Seeds 3 | | | |
| 2017 | Humming of Yaeko | Seigo Ishizaki | Lead role | |
| 2017 | Ankoku Joshi | Itsumi's father | | |
| 2020 | Beautiful Dreamer | Himself | | |
| 2021 | Love and the Grand Tug-of-war | | | |
| 2023 | We Make Antiques! Osaka Dreams | | | |
| 2023 | Confess to Your Crimes | | | |
| 2024 | Let It Rain | | | |
| 2024 | Aimitagai | | | |
| 2024 | Shinji Muroi: Not Defeated | Masayuki Sakamura | | |
| 2025 | Miharu ni Kasa o | | Lead role | |
| 2025 | A Sower of Seeds 5 | | | |
| 2026 | Agito: Psychic War | Yoshihiko Misugi | | |
| 2026 | Bayside Shakedown: N.E.W | Masayuki Sakamura | | |

=== Television ===
| Year | Title | Role | Notes | Ref. |
|---|---|---|---|---|
| 2001-2002 | Kamen Rider Agito | Yoshihiko Misugi | | |
| 2004 | Pretty Guardian Sailor Moon | Ryuuji Hino | Episodes 33 and 34 | |
| 2010 | Ryōmaden | Abe Masahiro | Taiga drama | |
| 2014 | Gunshi Kanbei | Ishikawa Gengo | Taiga drama | |
| 2015 | Here Comes Asa! | Tadaoki Imai | Asadora | |
| 2022 | Accomplishment of Fudanshi Bartender | Kanemitsu Hakushū | | |
| 2023 | Boogie Woogie | Ōkuma | Asadora | |
