= Sadamitsu the Destroyer =

Japanese manga series

破壊魔定光 (Hakaima Sadamitsu)
- Manga
- Written by: Masahiko Nakahira
- Published by: Shueisha
- Magazine: Ultra Jump
- Original run: 1999 – 2005
- Volumes: 12
- Anime television series
- Directed by: Koichi Ohata
- Written by: Chiaki J. Konaka; Satoru Nishizono; Shin Yoshida
- Music by: Taku Iwasaki
- Studio: Studio Deen
- Licensed by: NA: Media Blasters
- Original network: WOWOW
- Original run: January 17, 2001 – March 21, 2001
- Episodes: 10

Sadamitsu the Destroyer (破壊魔定光, Hakaima Sadamitsu) is a manga series by Masahiko Nakahira. It was adapted into a 10 episode anime series. The series was licensed in North America by Media Blasters in 2003.

== Plot ==
The story stars Tsubaki Sadamitsu, a young delinquent and leader of the Corpse Gang, who has a chance encounter with an alien robot working to capture banished intergalactic criminals who are arriving on Earth named Ryūkei-dai (流刑台; lit. "Exiled One"). When he ends up causing the robot's body to be destroyed, Sadamitsu discovers that its head can operate independently without the body, and wear the head as a helmet to gain some of the robot's powers. Ever-chivalrous, Sadamitsu becomes determined to make up for the mess his actions have caused, and accepts using these powers and working with the robot's computer to take up its mission. Though he receives other outside assistance, his job is made harder with the appearance of the Vulture, a last-ditch effort to keep the Ryūkei-dai under control.

== Main characters ==
Sadamitsu Tsubaki (椿 定光, Tsubaki Sadamitsu)
Voiced by: Yuji Ueda (Japanese); Wayne Grayson (English)
The hot-headed, fight-enjoying main character. While he loves a good fight, he detests pointless cruelty and never kills, even if his own life is threatened. His preferred weapon is a bokken (wooden sword). In combat, he wears the sentient helmet nicknamed 'Junk' and wields an energy weapon that seals the Ryūkei-dai away.
Junk (ポンコツ, Ponkotsu)
Voiced by: Kazuhiro Yamaji (Japanese); Sean Schemmel (English)
A robotic entity that identifies itself as Pursuer 7706983, Junk's body was destroyed during an encounter with a Ryūkei-dai. His severed head called out to Sadamitsu and, once worn as a helmet, empowered the youth enough to stand up to the superhuman strength of the Ryūkei-dai. While severely damaged towards the end of the anime, the Vulture's energy transfer revives him and Junk increases Sadamitsu's strength even further, adding new weapons to his arsenal. Sadamitsu refers to him as 'Junk' while other characters refer to him as 'Helmet', 'Helmet-san' (Mr. Helmet) and the like.
Aside from being capable of unassisted flight based on anti-gravity and commandeering nearby electronic equipment, Junk is capable of temporarily bonding with a person who wears his head as a helmet, enveloping the wearer in an impact-resistant material similar in appearance to Junk's original body; after the suit is upgraded, it gains a bulkier exoskeleton and a cape-like armor plate that can be jettisoned. His main weapon is the Activator, a palm-mounted energy pulse emitter that launches "inverse gravitational spheres" in order to safely Recover Ryūkei-dai by compressing their body in an immense gravitational field then launching the target into space, unharmed. After analyzing Sadamitsu's fighting style, Junk uses the Activator's gravity field to compress a lightning rod's boson particles into a metal bokken called a Boson Carried Terminator Outfit; this weapon is capable of initiating a Recovery with a single hit on the target. The destructive power of Junk's Activator can be increased with the sufficient application of energy up to a blast radius of thousands of kilometers, enough to shatter an Earth-sized planet.
Yayoi Kamishiro (神代やよい, Kamishiro Yayoi)
Voiced by: Rie Tanaka (Japanese); Mena Roberts (English)
A strange girl in Sadamitsu's class, Yayoi has many secrets about her. She also knows something about Sadamitsu's past and appears to be attracted to him, though she weirds him out. She is also a controller of Vulture, a humanoid that appears as an ornamental suit of golden armor but is actually a fully sentient miniature interstellar battleship. It is later revealed that she and Sadamitsu were childhood friends until the Vulture accidentally killed her upon arrival on Earth. Because the Vulture also lost its host body, it revived and possessed Yayoi, erasing Sadamitsu's memories about her. Meanwhile, it kept Yayoi's memories, ultimately resulting in the Vulture proceeding to hunt down the Ryūkei-dai rather than simply destroying the entire planet with its military-grade Activator, due to its new host's affection towards Sadamitsu. At first, Yayoi is shown to positively relish slaughtering Ryūkei-dai until Sadamitsu's angry protest awoke feelings of regret, escalating to the point where Yayoi attempts to heal a Ryūkei-dai she injured earlier and brutally massacres the humans who subject the creature to electric torture. Afterwards, the Vulture only kills Ryūkei-dai in self-defense.
Near the end of the anime, it is revealed that Vultures react to emergency requests by using a time dilation field in order to arrive on-site as soon as needed. Yayoi's Vulture appeared ahead of time due to an accident; by analyzing the data surrounding the event, Junk realized that he himself called for the Vulture's assistance in the future in reaction to a Ryūkei-dai infecting Yayoi's Vulture and overpowering Sadamitsu. With no alternate way to undo the infection, Yayoi is Recovered along with the Ryūkei-dai in order to undo the Vulture's initial arrival on Earth (since there is no reason to request its deployment). As a result, Yayoi is reset into a normal girl who never encountered the Vulture but retains childhood memories of Sadamitsu.
Kulon (クロン, Kuron)
Voiced by: Shigenori Yamazaki (Japanese); Sean Elias-Reyes (English)
Falsely banished as a criminal, Kulon landed on Earth among the other Ryūkei-dai. Being a speedster, stated to being the fastest in the universe, he caused some ruckus while being chased by the police. He was arrested in the first place because he enjoyed giving other beings the same feeling he had with his speed, but unknowingly gave a ride to criminals. Ultimately, he was taken in by Sadamitsu, where he served a role similar to that of a sidekick's, usually being used as a motorcycle. He proves to be very loyal, as he addresses Sadamitsu as Bro (兄貴, Aniki) and obeys his requests even when he is obviously frightened.
