= Riding Uphill =

- Directed by: Eguchi Kan
- Written by: Kanazawa Tomoki
- Produced by: Morikawa Koji; Setojima Masaaki
- Cinematography: Konomi Takahiro
- Distributed by: Magnetize
- Release date: 26 May 2018
- Country: Japan
- Language: Japanese

Riding Uphill (Japanese title Gachi Boshi ガチ★星) is a 2018 "local drama" Japanese film created by Nishi-Nihon Television. Directed by Kan Eguchi and starring Kenichi Abe, it shows the life of a downtrodden man who turns to competitive cycling to succeed.

== Overview ==
This is the second film in Nishi Nihon Television's "local drama" genre (which is designed to bring a spotlight to more local areas of the country and different walks of life in each said area). The first was the 2013 television drama Mentai Piriri (めんたいぴりり), also directed by Kan Eguchi. Mentai Pririri showed the life of a struggling actor living in the Fukuoka Prefecture area. Riding Uphill, too, focuses on the Fukuoka Prefecture lifestyle, and much of the promotional materials and events take place there.

After the success of the 2016 television drama, the footage was re-edited into a 90-minute feature film, which is set to be released in May 2018 by the distribution company Magnetize.

== Cast ==
- Koji Hamashima as Kenichi Abe
- Hisamatsu Takaaki as Fukuyama Shota
- Hamashima Yao as Hayashi Mari
- Uesugi Akira as Funasaki Ryo
- Iwashita Yoichiro as Morisaki Kengo
- Irie Kensuke as Ito Koichi
- Fukuda Kenji as Yoshizawa Shogo
- Yayama Shusaku as Nishihara Seigo
- Ramen patron as Hakata Hanamaru
- Konoshita Kazuhide as Moro Morooka
- Matsunaga Mami as Furusaki Hitomi
- Hamashima Kenta as Kimura Sei

== Summary ==
The story takes place a Kokura Cycling Stadium in Kita-Kyushu.
