= Yu Inaba =

Japanese actor

- Born: January 12, 1993 (age 33); Sagamihara, Kanagawa Prefecture, Japan
- Occupation: Actor
- Years active: 2009 – present
- Known for: Go Shijima/Kamen Rider Mach in Kamen Rider Drive (2015）
- Spouse: Nicole Fujita (m. 2023)
- Website: yu-inaba.lespros.net

Yu Inaba (稲葉 友, Inaba Yū; born January 12, 1993) is a Japanese actor, best known for his role as Go Shijima/Kamen Rider Mach in the Kamen Rider series Kamen Rider Drive.

== Biography ==
Inaba was born in Sagamihara, Kanagawa Prefecture. In November 2009, when he was a 16-year-old high school sophomore, he won the 22nd Junon Super Boy Contest Grand Prix. Inaba was awarded from among the largest number of 15,491 people. In 2010, he debuted in the TV drama Clone Baby. In 2011, Inaba first starred in the stage play Sanada Ten Braves: Boku-ra ga mamoritakatta mono.

On August 4, 2023, he announced his marriage with model Nicole Fujita on Instagram.

== Filmography ==
=== TV series ===
Year	Title	Role	Other notes	Ref.
2017	Naotora: The Lady Warlord		Taiga drama	
2021	Given	Ugetsu Murata		
2022	Harem Marriage	Ryunosuke Date		
2022–23	Minato's Laundromat	Shu Sakuma		
2025	Futari Solo Camp	Akihito Takigawa		
2027	Golden Kamuy: Karafuto Pursuit Arc	Tokishige Usami		

=== Films ===
Year	Title	Role	Other notes	Ref.
2016	Mars	Tatsuya Kida		
2020	Hotel Royal			
2021	Will I Be Single Forever?			
2022	Koi Kogare Utae	Kiritani	Lead role	
2023	#Mito	Kiyoshi Tanabe		
2026	Golden Kamuy: The Abashiri Prison Raid	Tokishige Usami		
