= Rei Yoshii =

Japanese actress and gravure idol (born 1982)

- Born: March 18, 1982 (age 44); Tokyo, Japan
- Occupations: Gravure idol; actress
- Years active: 1998–present
- Spouse: Shigenori Yamazaki (since 2016)

Rei Yoshii (吉井 怜, Yoshii Rei; born March 18, 1982) is a Japanese actress and gravure idol. She married actor Shigenori Yamazaki on November 11, 2016.

== Filmography ==
=== Musicals ===
- Rock Musical Bleach as Orihime Inoue
- Rock Musical Bleach Saien as Orihime Inoue

=== Movies ===
- Love My Life (????) as Ichiko Izumiya
- Mieruko-chan (2025)

=== Television ===
- Rosetta: The Masked Angel (1998) as Asuka Jin / Masked Angel Rosetta
- Ultraman Nexus (2004) as Nanaka
- Garo: Makai no Hana (2014) as Akari
- Kamen Rider Drive (2014) as Rinna Sawagami
- Kishiryu Sentai Ryusoulger (2019) as Kyōko Taniguchi
