= Kamen Rider Drive =

Television series

- Also known as: Kamen Driver
- Genre: Tokusatsu; Superhero fiction Action; Police drama Comedy; Slapstick
- Created by: Shotaro Ishinomori
- Written by: Riku Sanjo; Keiichi Hasegawa; Junko Komura; Nobuhiro Mouri
- Directed by: Ryuta Tasaki; Takayuki Shibasaki; Satoshi Morota; Kyohei Yamaguchi; Osamu Kaneda; Hidenori Ishida; Nobuhiro Suzumura; Shojiro Nakazawa; Kenzo Maihara
- Starring: Ryoma Takeuchi; Rio Uchida; Yu Inaba; Taiko Katono; Tomoya Warabino; Shota Matsushima; Fumika Baba; Tsurutaro Kataoka; Rei Yoshii; Kenta Hamano; Taira Imata
- Voices of: Chris Peppler; Masakazu Morita
- Narrated by: Chris Peppler
- Opening theme: "SURPRISE-DRIVE" by Mitsuru Matsuoka EARNEST DRIVE
- Composers: Shuhei Naruse; Kōtarō Nakagawa
- Country of origin: Japan
- Original language: Japanese
- No. of episodes: 48 (list of episodes)

Production
- Producers: Motoi Sasaki (TV Asahi); Takahito Ōmori (Toei); Taku Mochizuki (Toei)
- Running time: 20–25 minutes
- Production companies: Toei Company; Ishimori Productions; TV Asahi Corporation; Asatsu-DK

Original release
- Network: ANN (TV Asahi)
- Release: October 5, 2014 – September 27, 2015

Related
- Kamen Rider Gaim; Kamen Rider Ghost

Kamen Rider Drive (仮面ライダードライブ, Kamen Raidā Doraibu) is a Japanese tokusatsu television series serving as the 16th Heisei Kamen Rider Series, and 25th series overall. Riku Sanjo returns to the Kamen Rider Series to serve as Drive's lead screenwriter, with Ryuta Tasaki as director. It premiered on TV Asahi and affiliate stations throughout Japan on October 5, 2014, one week following its preceding series Kamen Rider Gaim's finale. The series joined Ressha Sentai ToQger, then Shuriken Sentai Ninninger in the Super Hero Time programming block until its conclusion on September 27, 2015. Drive is peculiar among the heroes in the Kamen Rider franchise, as his motif and main mode of transportation is a car, rather than the signature motorcycles used by his predecessors.

== Story ==
Shinnosuke Tomari is a former elite police officer in the Metropolitan Police, who, after an event that crippled one of his colleagues, has been "demoted" into the Special Investigations Division. This division looks into the stranger happenings in the city, particularly the recent "Density Shift" events. These events, termed "Slowdown" by the public, leave people unable to move. When he is chosen by the Drive Driver and Tridoron, Shinnosuke transforms into Kamen Rider Drive and is tasked with battling the Roidmudes who plan to rise against humanity and take over the world. He is aided by Kiriko Shijima and her brother Go, who transforms into Kamen Rider Mach. Chase, a special Roidmude with a strange past who was then known as Proto Drive and later became an evil warrior known as Machine Chaser, also reassumes his Rider identity and reclaims his 'justice' to protect humanity as he transforms into Kamen Rider Chaser. However, a greater threat later appears in the form of Kiriko and Go's father, Tenjuro Banno, the scientist who created the Roidmudes, who despite having long lost his human body, revives in the form of the evil Gold Drive, intending to make use of the remaining Roidmudes in his plan to bring down the whole world at his mercy.

== Production and development ==
The Kamen Rider Drive trademark was registered by Toei on April 17, 2014.

The series marks the first time that a Kamen Rider's main vehicle is a car rather than a motorcycle, which has been remarked upon by entertainment news as a shock and a major change from previous Kamen Rider television series.

== Episodes ==
No.	Title	Directed by	Written by	Original release date
1	"Why Has My Time Stopped?"; Transliteration: "Ore no Jikan wa Naze Tomatta no ka" (Japanese: 俺の時間はなぜ止まったのか)	Ryuta Tasaki	Riku Sanjo	October 5, 2014
2	"What Is a Kamen Rider?"; Transliteration: "Kamen Raidā to wa Nani ka" (Japanese: 仮面ライダーとはなにか)	Ryuta Tasaki	Riku Sanjo	October 12, 2014
3	"Who Stole Her Smile?"; Transliteration: "Dare ga Kanojo no Egao o Ubatta no ka" (Japanese: だれが彼女の笑顔を奪ったのか)	Takayuki Shibasaki	Riku Sanjo	October 19, 2014
4	"What Is the Proud Chaser Thinking About?"; Transliteration: "Hokoritakaki Tsuisekisha wa Nani o Omou no ka" (Japanese: 誇り高き追跡者はなにを思うのか)	Takayuki Shibasaki	Riku Sanjo	October 26, 2014
5	"What Are the Steel Robbers After?"; Transliteration: "Hagane no Gōtōdan wa Nani o Nerau no ka" (Japanese: 鋼の強盗団はなにを狙うのか)	Satoshi Morota	Riku Sanjo	November 9, 2014
6	"Who Does the Warrior Fight For?"; Transliteration: "Senshi wa Dare no Tame ni Tatakau no ka" (Japanese: 戦士はだれのために戦うのか)	Satoshi Morota	Riku Sanjo	November 16, 2014
7	"How Was That Decisive Moment Captured?"; Transliteration: "Ketteiteki Shunkan wa Ika ni Satsuei-sareta no ka" (Japanese: 決定的瞬間はいかに撮影されたのか)	Kyohei Yamaguchi	Keiichi Hasegawa	November 23, 2014
8	"What Is the Secret That Dwells in the Heart?"; Transliteration: "Sono Mune ni Yadoru Himitsu to wa Nani ka" (Japanese: その胸に宿る秘密とはなにか)	Kyohei Yamaguchi	Keiichi Hasegawa	November 30, 2014
9	"How Can I Get Used to the Cool Body?"; Transliteration: "Dō Sureba Kūru Bodi ni Nareru no ka" (Japanese: どうすればクールボディになれるのか)	Osamu Kaneda	Riku Sanjo	December 7, 2014
10	"What Is in the Belt's Past?"; Transliteration: "Beruto no Kako ni Nani ga Atta no ka" (Japanese: ベルトの過去になにがあったのか)	Osamu Kaneda	Riku Sanjo	December 14, 2014
11	"Who Can Prevent the Dark Eve?"; Transliteration: "Ankoku no Ibu o Fusegu no wa Dare ka" (Japanese: 暗黒の聖夜を防ぐのはだれか)	Osamu Kaneda	Riku Sanjo	December 21, 2014
12	"Where Did the White Kamen Rider Come From?"; Transliteration: "Shiroi Kamen Raidā wa Doko kara Kita no ka" (Japanese: 白い仮面ライダーはどこから来たのか)	Hidenori Ishida	Riku Sanjo	December 28, 2014
13	"Why Won't My Little Brother Put On the Brakes?"; Transliteration: "Watashi no Otōto ni wa Naze Burēki ga Nai no ka" (Japanese: 私の弟にはなぜブレーキがないのか)	Hidenori Ishida	Riku Sanjo	January 11, 2015
14	"Who Is the Black Shadow Chasing Her?"; Transliteration: "Kanojo o Nerau Kuroi Kage wa Dare ka" (Japanese: 彼女を狙う黒い影はだれか)	Satoshi Morota	Keiichi Hasegawa	January 18, 2015
15	"When Will These Feelings Reach You?"; Transliteration: "Sono Omoi ga Todoku no wa Itsu ka" (Japanese: その想いが届くのはいつか)	Satoshi Morota	Keiichi Hasegawa	January 25, 2015
16	"Why Is Rinna Sawagami Fidgeting?"; Transliteration: "Sawagami Rinna wa Naze Sowasowa Shiteita no ka" (Japanese: 沢神りんなはなぜソワソワしていたのか)	Kyohei Yamaguchi	Riku Sanjo	February 1, 2015
17	"Who Will Control the Deadheat?"; Transliteration: "Deddohīto o Seisuru no wa Dare ka" (Japanese: デッドヒートを制するのはだれか)	Kyohei Yamaguchi	Riku Sanjo	February 8, 2015
18	"Why Is Lieutenant Otta Following That Guy?"; Transliteration: "Naze Otta Keibuho wa Soitsu o Otta no ka" (Japanese: なぜ追田警部補はそいつを追ったのか)	Hidenori Ishida	Keiichi Hasegawa	February 15, 2015
19	"What Can Judge a Detective?"; Transliteration: "Nani ga Keiji o Sabaku no ka" (Japanese: なにが刑事を裁くのか)	Hidenori Ishida	Keiichi Hasegawa	February 22, 2015
20	"When Did Kyu Saijo Become a Roidmude?"; Transliteration: "Saijō Kyū wa Itsu kara Roimyūdo Datta no ka" (Japanese: 西城究はいつからロイミュードだったのか)	Osamu Kaneda	Riku Sanjo	March 1, 2015
21	"What Do the Unusual Dead Speak About?"; Transliteration: "Fuzoroi no Shisha-tachi wa Nani o Kataru no ka" (Japanese: 不揃いの死者たちはなにを語るのか)	Osamu Kaneda	Riku Sanjo	March 8, 2015
22	"How Do I Fight With the F1 Body?"; Transliteration: "Efu Wan Bodi de Dō Yatte Tatakaeba Ii no ka" (Japanese: F1ボディでどうやって戦えばいいのか)	Osamu Kaneda	Riku Sanjo	March 15, 2015
23	"Who Can Stop the Mischievous Smile?"; Transliteration: "Itazura na Emi o Tomeru no wa Dare ka" (Japanese: 悪戯な笑みを止めるのはだれか)	Nobuhiro Suzumura	Junko Komura	March 22, 2015
SP	"Shuriken Sentai Ninninger vs. Kamen Rider Drive: Spring Break Combined 1 Hour Special"; Transliteration: "Shuriken Sentai Ninninjā Tai Kamen Raidā Doraibu Haruyasumi Gattai Ichijikan Supesharu" (Japanese: 手裏剣戦隊ニンニンジャーVS仮面ライダードライブ 春休み合体1時間スペシャル)	Shojiro Nakazawa	Riku Sanjo	March 29, 2015
24	"What Is Making Mach Run?"; Transliteration: "Nani ga Mahha o Hashiraseru no ka" (Japanese: なにがマッハを走らせるのか)	Nobuhiro Suzumura	Junko Kōmura	April 5, 2015
25	"Why Has a New Battle Begun?"; Transliteration: "Aratanaru Tatakai wa Naze Hajimatta no ka" (Japanese: 新たなる闘いはなぜ始まったのか)	Satoshi Morota	Riku Sanjo	April 12, 2015
26	"Where Will Chaser Proceed?"; Transliteration: "Cheisā wa Doko e Mukau no ka" (Japanese: チェイサーはどこへ向かうのか)	Satoshi Morota	Riku Sanjo	April 19, 2015
27	"What Is Go Shijima's Reason to Fight?"; Transliteration: "Shijima Gō ga Tatakau Riyū wa Nani ka" (Japanese: 詩島剛が戦う理由はなにか)	Hidenori Ishida	Keiichi Hasegawa	April 26, 2015
28	"Why Were the Families Targeted?"; Transliteration: "Naze Kazoku wa Nerawareta no ka" (Japanese: なぜ家族は狙われたのか)	Hidenori Ishida	Keiichi Hasegawa	May 3, 2015
29	"What Really Happened During the Robbery?"; Transliteration: "Gōtō Jiken de Hontō wa Nani ga Atta no ka" (Japanese: 強盜事件で本当はなにがあったのか)	Ryuta Tasaki	Junko Kōmura	May 10, 2015
30	"Who Will Reveal the True Culprit?"; Transliteration: "Shin Hannin o Kataru no wa Dare ka" (Japanese: 真犯人を語るのは誰か)	Ryuta Tasaki	Junko Kōmura	May 17, 2015
31	"Why Did the Important Memories Disappear?"; Transliteration: "Taisetsu na Kioku wa Dōshite Kesareta no ka" (Japanese: 大切な記憶はどうして消されたのか)	Kyohei Yamaguchi	Keiichi Hasegawa	May 24, 2015
32	"What Is Waiting at the End of Evolution?"; Transliteration: "Shinka no Hate ni Matsu Mono wa Nani ka" (Japanese: 進化の果てに待つものはなにか)	Kyohei Yamaguchi	Keiichi Hasegawa	May 31, 2015
33	"Who Claimed the Life of Shinnosuke Tomari?"; Transliteration: "Dare ga Tomari Shin'nosuke no Inochi o Ubatta no ka" (Japanese: だれが泊進ノ介の命を奪ったのか)	Satoshi Morota	Riku Sanjo	June 7, 2015
34	"Who Claimed the Life of Eisuke Tomari?"; Transliteration: "Dare ga Tomari Eisuke no Inochi o Ubatta no ka" (Japanese: だれが泊英介の命を奪ったのか)	Satoshi Morota	Riku Sanjo	June 14, 2015
35	"Why Did the Besiege Incident Happen?"; Transliteration: "Rōjō Jiken wa Naze Okita no ka" (Japanese: ろう城事件はなぜ起きたのか)	Kyohei Yamaguchi	Keiichi Hasegawa	June 28, 2015
36	"Where Will the Bullet Guide Justice?"; Transliteration: "Jūdan wa doko ni Seigi o Michibiku no ka" (Japanese: 銃弾はどこに正義を導くのか)	Kyohei Yamaguchi	Keiichi Hasegawa	July 5, 2015
37	"Who Is Searching for the Ultimate Flavor?"; Transliteration: "Kyūkyoku no Mikaku o Nerau no wa Dare ka" (Japanese: 究極の味覚を狙うのはだれか)	Kenzo Maihara	Riku Sanjo	July 12, 2015
38	"Why Does the Devil Still Want to Evolve?"; Transliteration: "Akuma wa Naze Shinka o Motometsuzukeru no ka" (Japanese: 悪魔はなぜ進化を求め続けるのか)	Kenzo Maihara	Riku Sanjo	July 19, 2015
39	"Where Will the Whirlwind Kidnappers Strike Next?"; Transliteration: "Senpū no Yūkaihan wa Itsu Osottekuru no ka" (Japanese: 旋風の誘拐犯はいつ襲って来るのか)	Takayuki Shibasaki	Riku Sanjo	July 26, 2015
40	"Why Did the Two Genius Researchers Clash?"; Transliteration: "Futari no Tensai Kagakusha wa Naze Shōtotsu Shita no ka" (Japanese: 2人の天才科学者はなぜ衝突したのか)	Takayuki Shibasaki	Riku Sanjo	August 2, 2015
41	"How Was the Golden Drive Born?"; Transliteration: "Ōgon no Doraibu wa Dō Yatte Umareta no ka" (Japanese: 黄金のドライブはどうやって生まれたのか)	Kyohei Yamaguchi	Keiichi Hasegawa	August 9, 2015
42	"Where Is the Goddess' Truth?"; Transliteration: "Megami no Shinjitsu wa Doko ni Aru no ka" (Japanese: 女神の真実はどこにあるのか)	Kyohei Yamaguchi	Keiichi Hasegawa	August 16, 2015
43	"When Will the Second Global Freeze Start?"; Transliteration: "Dai Ni no Gurōbaru Furīzu wa Itsu Okiru no ka" (Japanese: 第二のグローバルフリーズはいつ起きるのか)	Hidenori Ishida	Riku Sanjo	August 23, 2015
44	"Who Had Loved Heart the Most?"; Transliteration: "Dare ga Hāto o Ichiban Aishiteita ka" (Japanese: だれがハートを一番愛していたか)	Hidenori Ishida	Riku Sanjo	August 30, 2015
45	"What Is the Roidmudes' Final Dream?"; Transliteration: "Roimyūdo no Saigo no Yume to wa Nani ka" (Japanese: ロイミュードの最後の夢とはなにか)	Takayuki Shibasaki	Riku Sanjo	September 6, 2015
46	"Why Did They Have to Fight?"; Transliteration: "Karera wa Naze Tatakawanakereba Naranakatta no ka" (Japanese: 彼らはなぜ戦わなければならなかったのか)	Takayuki Shibasaki	Riku Sanjo	September 13, 2015
47	"Who Will You Entrust the Future to, My Friend?"; Transliteration: "Tomo yo, Kimi wa Dare ni Mirai o Takusu no ka" (Japanese: 友よ、君はだれに未来を託すのか)	Takayuki Shibasaki	Riku Sanjo	September 20, 2015
48	"The Case of Ghost"; Transliteration: "Gōsuto no Jiken" (Japanese: ゴーストの事件)	Osamu Kaneda	Nobuhiro Mouri	September 27, 2015

== Films ==
=== Movie War Full Throttle ===
The Kamen Rider × Kamen Rider Drive & Gaim: Movie War Full Throttle (仮面ライダー×仮面ライダードライブ&鎧武 MOVIE大戦フルスロットル, Kamen Raidā × Kamen Raidā Doraibu Ando Gaimu Mūbī Taisen Furu Surottoru) was released in Japanese theaters on December 13, 2014. It features a crossover with the previously aired Kamen Rider series Kamen Rider Gaim. The Kamen Rider Drive portion of the film guest stars Yūji Ayabe of the owarai duo Piece as the antagonist Kamen Rider Lupin (仮面ライダールパン, Kamen Raidā Rupan). The events of the movie took place between episodes 9 and 10.

The first million ticket buyers would also receive a special DVD featuring Type Zero Episode 0: Countdown to Global Freeze, one of the Secret Mission series of Drive.

=== Super Hero Taisen GP ===
Super Hero Taisen GP: Kamen Rider 3 (スーパーヒーロー大戦GP 仮面ライダー3号, Supā Hīrō Taisen Guranpuri Kamen Raidā Sangō) is the 2015 entry of the "Super Hero Taisen" film series, featuring the cast of Kamen Rider Drive and the appearance of Kamen Rider 3, which was originally created by Shotaro Ishinomori for the one-shot 1972 manga Rider #3 VS. General Black (3ごうライダーたい ブラックしょうぐんのまき, Sangō Raidā Tai Burakku Shōgun no Maki). Tetsuo Kurata, (Kamen Rider Black, Kamen Rider Black RX), Yuichi Nakamura (Kamen Rider Den-O), Kousei Amano, Takayuki Tsubaki, Ryoji Morimoto and Takahiro Hojo (Kamen Rider Blade), and Kento Handa (Kamen Rider 555) reprised their roles in the film, which opened in theaters on March 21, 2015. A new actor Mitsuhiro Oikawa, confirmed to perform his role as Kamen Rider 3, as well as Shuriken Sentai Ninninger cast also appeared. The events of the movie took place between Episode 22 and 23.

=== Surprise Future ===
Kamen Rider Drive the Movie: Surprise Future (劇場版 仮面ライダードライブ サプライズ・フューチャー, Gekijōban Kamen Raidā Doraibu Sapuraizu Fyūchā)) was released in Japanese theaters on August 8, 2015, double-billed with Shuriken Sentai Ninninger the Movie: The Dinosaur Lord's Splendid Ninja Scroll!. It features a new enemy Rider known as Kamen Rider Dark Drive, driving a Rider Machine labeled the "NexTridoron", based on a real life Mercedes-AMG GT car. It also featured the first on-screen appearance of the 17th Heisei Kamen Rider: Kamen Rider Ghost, who later reappeared in two last episodes of this TV series, followed by the appearance of some Gamma Assaults and Yurusen in the final/special episode. The events of the movie took place between episodes 40 and 41, with the flashback scene in the final/special episode shown was after this movie event is over and before episode 41 starts.

=== Super Movie War Genesis ===
Kamen Rider × Kamen Rider Ghost & Drive: Super Movie War Genesis (仮面ライダー×仮面ライダー ゴースト&ドライブ 超MOVIE大戦ジェネシス, Kamen Raidā × Kamen Raidā Gōsuto Ando Doraibu Chō Mūbī Taisen Jeneshisu) was released in Japanese theaters on December 12, 2015. It featured a crossover between Kamen Rider Drive and Kamen Rider Ghost.

=== Heisei Generations ===
A Movie War film, titled Kamen Rider Heisei Generations: Dr. Pac-Man vs. Ex-Aid & Ghost with Legend Rider (仮面ライダー平成ジェネレーションズ Dr.パックマン対エグゼイド&ゴーストwithレジェンドライダー, Kamen Raidā Heisei Jenerēshonzu Dokutā Pakkuman Tai Eguzeido Ando Gōsuto Wizu Rejendo Raidā), was released in Japan on December 10, 2016. The film features Kamen Rider Drive teaming up with Kamen Rider Ex-Aid, Kamen Rider Ghost, Kamen Rider Gaim, and Kamen Rider Wizard as they battle against a virus based on Bandai Namco Entertainment's video game character, Pac-Man. The professional wrestler Hiroshi Tanahashi was announced to be one of the main antagonists of the movie.

=== Kamen Rider Zi-O the Movie: Over Quartzer ===
Kamen Rider Zi-O the Movie: Over Quartzer (劇場版 仮面ライダージオウ Over Quartzer, Gekijōban Kamen Raidā Jiō Ōvā Kwōtsā) was released on July 26, 2019. The film features Go Shijima and Krim Steinbelt teaming up with Time Riders to stop Quartzers from erasing Krim's family ancestors from 1575 of the Sengoku period.

== Secret Missions ==
The Secret Missions (シークレット・ミッション, Shīkuretto Misshon) are a series of special episodes.

- Type TV-Kun Hunter & Monster! Chase the Mystery of the Super Thief! (type TV-KUN ハンター&モンスター! 超怪盗の謎を追え!, Taipu Terebi-kun Hantā Ando Monsutā! Chō Kaitō no Nazo o Oe!) is a special DVD packaged with the January 2015 issue of the Televi-Kun magazine. It is connected to the Kamen Rider Drive portion of Movie War Full Throttle and Type Zero and features Roidmude 005. The events of the episode took place between episodes 4 and 5.
- Type Zero Episode 0: Countdown to Global Freeze (type ZERO 第0話 カウントダウン to グローバルフリーズ, Taipu Zero Dai-zero-wa Kauntodaun to Gurōbaru Furīzu) is a special DVD given to the first million ticket buyers for Movie War Full Throttle. It serves as a prequel episode to the Kamen Rider Drive series and features Kamen Rider Proto Drive.
- Type Tokujo (type TOKUJO) is included as part of the Blu-ray releases. It comprises four episodes and features the origin of the Special Investigations Division. The events of the episode took place between episodes 22 and 23.
1. How Were the Members of the Special Investigations Division Selected? (特状課はどうやって集められたのか, Toku-jō-ka wa Dō Yatte Atsumerareta no ka)
2. Just What Is the Anima System? (アニマシステムとは一体なにか, Anima Shisutemu to wa Ittai Nani ka)
3. Who Killed Professor Odagiri? (だれが小田桐教授を殺したのか, Dare ga Odagari-kyōju o Koroshita no ka)
4. Why Did Professor Banno Aim for Global Freeze? (なぜ蛮野博士はグローバルフリーズを狙ったのか, Naze Banno-hakase wa Gurōbaru Furīzu o Neratta no ka)
- Type High Speed! The True Power! Type High Speed Is Born! (type HIGH SPEED! ホンモノの力! タイプハイスピード誕生!, Taipu Hai Supīdo! Honmono no Chikara! Taipu Hai Supīdo Tanjō!) is a "Hyper Battle DVD" (超(ハイパー)バトルDVD, Haipā Batoru Dī Bui Dī) special. While investigating reports of counterfeit Televi-Kun magazines, Shinnosuke finds himself outmatched by a Roidmude that replicates his Kamen Rider Drive Type Speed form and overpowers him. To counter the fraud Kamen Rider, Shinnosuke has the Speed Shift Car remodeled to fight back as Kamen Rider Drive Type High Speed.
- Type Lupin! ~Lupin, the Last Challenge~ (type LUPIN! ～ルパン、最後の挑戦状～, Taipu Rupan! Rupan, Saigo no Chōsenjō) is a "Hyper Battle DVD" special. It features the return of Kamen Rider Lupin, since his last appearance in Movie War Full Throttle.

== Drive Saga ==
Drive Saga (ドライブサーガ, Doraibu Sāga) is a hybrid set with the combination of V-Cinema, CD audio drama and web releases that serve as spin-offs of characters from the Kamen Rider Drive series.

- Kamen Rider Chaser (仮面ライダーチェイサー, Kamen Raidā Cheisā) focuses on a side story of Chase as Kamen Rider Chaser. The V-Cinema was released on April 20, 2016. The events of the episode take place between Kamen Rider Drive: Surprise Future and episode 41. In addition, Minehiro Kinomoto reprised his role as Ryu Terui/Kamen Rider Accel from Kamen Rider W in a crossover with Drive. The theme song is "good bye little moon" performed by Mitsuru Matsuoka EARNEST DRIVE. It is written by Riku Sanjo, with Hidenori Ishida as director of the film.
- Kamen Rider Mach/Kamen Rider Heart (仮面ライダーマッハ／仮面ライダーハート, Kamen Raidā Mahha/Kamen Raidā Hāto) focuses on side stories of Go Shijima as Kamen Rider Mach and Heart, fighting as Kamen Rider Heart against a new enemy that is threatening individuals who served as models for the other Roidmudes. The V-Cinemas were released on November 16, 2016. The events of the episodes take place after the events of Kamen Rider Drive: Mach Saga and Kamen Rider Heisei Generations. The theme song is "eternity (~from SURPRISE-DRIVE)" performed by Mitsuru Matsuoka EARNEST DRIVE. It is written by Sanjo (Heart) and Keiichi Hasegawa (Mach), while Ishida directed both films.
- The Story of Kamen Rider Mach's Dream (仮面ライダーマッハ夢想伝, Kamen Raidā Mahha Musōden) focuses on a side story of Go Shijima as Kamen Rider Mach. The CD audio drama was released on November 25, 2016. The events of the episode take place between Mach Saga and Kamen Rider Heart.
- Kamen Rider Brain (仮面ライダーブレン, Kamen Raidā Buren) focuses on a side story of Brain, becoming Kamen Rider Brain. Originally announced as an April Fool's joke in 2017, the web series comprises two episodes and was released on Toei Tokusatsu Fan Club on April 28, 2019. It is written by Riku Sanjo and directed by Kyohei Yamaguchi.

== Novel ==
Novel: Kamen Rider Drive: Mach Saga (小説 仮面ライダードライブ マッハサーガ, Shōsetsu Kamen Raidā Doraibu Mahha Sāga), written by Takahito Ōmori and supervised by Keiichi Hasegawa, is part of a series of spin-off novel adaptions of the Heisei Era Kamen Riders. The events of the episode take place two years after the final episode, Kamen Rider x Kamen Rider Ghost & Drive: Super Movie War Genesis, along with the final episode of Kamen Rider Ghost in 2018. The novel was released on April 20, 2016.

== Video game ==
Kamen Rider: Battride War Genesis (仮面ライダー バトライド・ウォー 創生, Kamen Raidā Batoraido Wō Sōsei), a third installment of the Kamen Rider: Battride War series, was released in 2016 for the PlayStation consoles (PlayStation 3, PlayStation 4, and PlayStation Vita). It features characters from Kamen Rider Drive, Kamen Rider Ghost, characters in previous versions of the game that were included as NPCs or assistants, as well as the Shōwa era Kamen Riders.

== Cast ==
- Shinnosuke Tomari (泊 進ノ介, Tomari Shin'nosuke): Ryoma Takeuchi (竹内 涼真, Takeuchi Ryōma)
- Kiriko Shijima (詩島 霧子, Shijima Kiriko): Rio Uchida (内田 理央, Uchida Rio)
- Chase (チェイス, Cheisu), Koichi Kano (狩野 洸一, Kano Kōichi; 47): Taiko Katono (上遠野 太洸, Katōno Taikō)
- Go Shijima (詩島 剛, Shijima Gō): Yu Inaba (稲葉 友, Inaba Yū)
- Rinna Sawagami (沢神 りんな, Sawagami Rinna): Rei Yoshii (吉井 怜, Yoshii Rei)
- Kyu Saijo (西城 究, Saijō Kyū), Roidmude 072 (ロイミュード072, Roimyūdo Zero Nana Ni; 20): Kenta Hamano (浜野 謙太, Hamano Kenta)
- Genpachiro Otta (追田 現八郎, Otta Genpachirō): Taira Imata (井俣 太良, Imata Taira)
- Heart (ハート, Hāto), Businessman (40): Tomoya Warabino (蕨野 友也, Warabino Tomoya)
- Brain (ブレン, Buren), Mitsuharu Kineta (杵田 光晴, Kineta Mitsuharu; 43): Shota Matsushima (松島 庄汰, Matsushima Shōta)
- Medic (メディック, Medikku), Misuzu Hatori (羽鳥 美鈴, Hatori Misuzu; 41–42): Fumika Baba (馬場 ふみか, Baba Fumika)
- Akira Hayase (早瀬 明, Hayase Akira): Yukihiro Takiguchi (滝口 幸広, Takiguchi Yukihiro)
- Harley Hendrickson (ハーレー・ヘンドリクソン, Hārē Hendorikuson): Ulf Ōtsuki (大月 ウルフ, Ōtsuki Urufu)
- Eisuke Tomari (泊 英介, Tomari Eisuke): Tareyanagi (たれやなぎ)
- Mitsuhide Nira (仁良 光秀, Nira Mitsuhide): Kisuke Iida (飯田 基祐, Iida Kisuke)
- Soichi Makage (真影 壮一, Makage Sōichi): Masami Horiuchi (堀内 正美, Horiuchi Masami)
- Jun Honganji (本願寺 純, Honganji Jun): Tsurutaro Kataoka (片岡 鶴太郎, Kataoka Tsurutarō)

=== Voice cast ===
- Krim Steinbelt (クリム・スタインベルト, Kurimu Sutainberuto)/Mr. Belt (ベルトさん, Beruto-san)/Drive Driver (ドライブドライバー, Doraibu Doraibā), Narrator, Roidmude 004 (ロイミュード004, Roimyūdo Zero Zero Yon; 43–44): Chris Peppler (クリス・ペプラー, Kurisu Pepurā)
- Tenjuro Banno (蛮野 天十郎, Banno Tenjūrō)/Banno Driver (バンノドライバー, Banno Doraibā), Sigma Circular (シグマサーキュラー, Shiguma Sākyurā; 46–47): Masakazu Morita (森田 成一, Morita Masakazu)

=== Guest cast ===
- Niina Kisaragi (如月 仁奈, Kisaragi Niina; 2, 13–14): Hitomi Isaka (井坂 仁美, Isaka Hitomi; of Kamen Rider Girls)
- Satsuki Yamabuki (山吹 沙月, Yamabuki Satsuki; 2, 13–14): Mitsuki Endo (遠藤 三貴, Endō Mitsuki; of Kamen Rider Girls)
- Kazuhiro Asaya (浅矢 一広, Asaya Kazuhiro; 3–4): Lou Oshiba (ルー大柴, Rū Ōshiba)
- Crush (クラッシュ, Kurasshu; 4-6): HIRO (of Yasuda Dai Circus)
- Roidmude 060 (ロイミュード060, Roimyūdo Zero Roku Zero; 5): Danchō Yasuda (団長安田; of Yasuda Dai Circus)
- Roidmude 074 (ロイミュード074, Roimyūdo Zero Nana Yon; 5–6): Kuro-chan (クロちゃん; of Yasuda Dai Circus)
- Mitsuru Kuramochi (倉持 満, Kuramochi Mitsuru; 5–6): Tomonori Mizuno (水野 智則, Mizuno Tomonori)
- Yuzo Ichikawa (市川 勇蔵, Ichikawa Yūzō; 5–6): Kohei Yamamoto (山本 康平, Yamamoto Kōhei)
- Kenta Takasugi (高杉 憲太, Takasugi Kenta; 6-8): Kenta Uchino (内野 謙太, Uchino Kenta)
- Shunsuke Kusaka (久坂 俊介, Kusaka Shunsuke; 6-8): Takuya Nagaoka (永岡 卓也, Nagaoka Takuya)
- Koya Nishihori (西堀 光也, Nishihori Kōya; 11): Toru Nomaguchi (野間口 徹, Nomaguchi Tōru)
- Gunman (ガンマン, Ganman; 12–13): Bernard Ackah (ベルナール・アッカ, Berunāru Akka)
- Rira Nanao (七尾 リラ, Nanao Rira; 14–15): Haruka Suenaga (末永 遥, Suenaga Haruka)
- Hiroki Nikaido (二階堂 弘樹, Nikaidō Hiroki; 15): Masashi Mikami (三上 真史, Mikami Masashi)
- Shu Amagi (甘城 秀, Amagi Shū; 16): Hiroshi Matsunaga (松永 博史, Matsunaga Hiroshi)
- Makoto Asamura (浅村 誠, Asamura Makoto; 18–19) Takaya Aoyagi (青柳 尊哉, Aoyagi Takaya)
- Takuro Mogi (茂木 拓郎, Mogi Takurō; 23–24): Naoki Takeshi (武子 直輝, Takeshi Naoki)
- Yu Itagaki (板垣 祐, Itagaki Yū; 37–38): Shugo Nagashima (永嶋 柊吾, Nagashima Shūgo)
- Kazuya Igarashi (五十嵐 一也, Igarashi Kazuya; 41–42): Ren Yagami (八神 蓮, Yagami Ren)
- Kamen Rider Ghost (仮面ライダーゴースト, Kamen Raidā Gōsuto; Voice; 47–48): Shun Nishime (西銘 駿, Nishime Shun)
- Yurusen (ユルセン; Voice; 48): Aoi Yūki (悠木 碧, Yūki Aoi)
- Keisuke Okamura (岡村 敬助, Okamura Keisuke; 48): Hassei Takano (高野 八誠, Takano Hassei)

== Theme songs ==
Opening theme

- SURPRISE-DRIVE
  - Lyrics: Shoko Fujibayashi
  - Composition & Arrangement: tatsuo (of everset)
  - Artist: Mitsuru Matsuoka EARNEST DRIVE
  SOPHIA's vocalist Mitsuru Matsuoka performs the series' theme song "SURPRISE-DRIVE" under the name "Mitsuru Matsuoka EARNEST DRIVE". This is his third song performed for the Kamen Rider Series, following his song "W" for the theme song of the film Kamen Rider W Forever: A to Z/The Gaia Memories of Fate and performing vocals in SOPHIA on "cod-E ~E no Angō~" for Kamen Rider W Returns. The other members of the Mitsuru Matsuoka EARNEST DRIVE band are everset's guitarist tatsuo, session bassist IKUO, and Siam Shade drummer Jun-ji (IKUO and Jun-ji are also members of BULL ZEICHEN 88).

Insert themes

- "Full throttle"
  - Lyrics: Shoko Fujibayashi
  - Composition & Arrangement: tatsuo (of everset)
  - Artist: S.S.P.D. ~Steel Sound Police Dept~
  - Episodes: 13–14, 16–17, 19, 24, 46
  "Full throttle" is the theme for Kamen Rider Mach.
- "Don't lose your mind"
  - Lyrics: Shoko Fujibayashi
  - Composition & Arrangement: tatsuo (of everset)
  - Artist: S.S.P.D. ~Steel Sound Police Dept~
  - Episodes: 15–16, 18, 30
  "Don't lose your mind" is the theme for Kamen Rider Drive Type Speed.
- "UNLIMITED DRIVE"
  - Lyrics: Shoko Fujibayashi
  - Composition: DJ Hurrykenn
  - Arrangement: Ryo (of defspiral)
  - Artist: Kamen Rider Girls
  - Episodes: 33–34
  "UNLIMITED DRIVE" is the theme for Kamen Rider Drive Type Tridoron.
- "Spinning Wheel"
  - Lyrics: Shoko Fujibayashi
  - Composition & Arrangement: Shuhei Naruse
  - Artist: Shinnosuke Tomari, Go Shijima, & Chase (Ryoma Takeuchi, Yu Inaba, & Taiko Katono)
  - Episodes: 36, 38, 40, 45
