= List of Kamen Rider Drive episodes =

This is a list of episodes of the 2014–2015 Kamen Rider Series Kamen Rider Drive. Reflecting the detective-investigative quality of the show, each episode's title is a question.

== Episodes ==
| No. | Title | Directed by | Written by | Original release date |
|---|---|---|---|---|
| 1 | "Why Has My Time Stopped?"; Transliteration: "Ore no Jikan wa Naze Tomatta no ka" (Japanese: 俺の時間はなぜ止まったのか) | Ryuta Tasaki | Riku Sanjo | October 5, 2014 |
One night in Japan, a sudden strange phenomenon called Global Freeze occurs where worldwide time surroundings become slower saves the human consciousness. New breed of monsters who declared themselves Roidmudes go on a killing spree. Some of the citizens cannot save themselves due to the slowdown period. An unknown warrior appeared out of nowhere and battled the Roidmudes with his Shift Cars companions. At the same time, police officer Shinnosuke Tomari and Akira Hayase were apprehending criminals. Hayase was cornered between a flammable generator and one of the two criminals. Panicking, Shinnosuke pulled out his gun and tried to aim at the criminal, but due to the Slowdown effect, he accidentally shot the generator, causing it to explode and in the process, causing some pipes to collapse. As he tried to save Hayase from the falling pipes, the Slowdown effect happened once again, causing him to be unable to save his partner from being crushed. Half a year later, while Shinnosuke was slacking at Kuruma Park, Kiriko dragged him to the Special Investigation Unit base, hearing that the team would investigate the Heavy Acceleration cases with Lieutenant Otta. Shinnosuke went to Tridoron, recalling the incident back then had broken his fighting spirit. After another Heaviness detected, the team was sent Kiriko and Shinnosuke (being forced by Mr. Belt) to the location. While investigating, the victim shown was drained, with his body turned red. Shinnosuke picked a sample and Mr. Belt warned him that the culprit is still nearby. Soon the Heaviness started again and Roidmude 029 appeared and attacked Shinnosuke until three Shift Cars attacked him. The Roidmude retreated from the area while cancelling his Heaviness. After composing how the depicted culprit looked like, Shinnosuke straightened his tie and began his search of the culprit, whom also known as Nobou Masuda but with a hair. He went to a nearby gym where Nobou/Roidmude 029 had just plan an attack on an unsuspecting gym member out on a jog. Roidmude 029 initiate the Heaviness again but Mr. Belt managed to summon Max Flare Shift Car to help Shinnosuke adapting into the Heaviness. The Roidmude summon his aides, Roidmude 042 and Roidmude 088 until Kiriko and Tridoron appeared to help. She assisted Shinnosuke to transform into Drive and the latter managed to turn the tables until 029 take the lead and throw him in a warehouse. It wasn't long until Kiriko sent all of her Shift Cars, Funky Spike and Midnight Shadow Shift Cars battering 029 enough to help out Drive. 029 was soon pelted by a discarded Type Speed Tire as Drive went Type Speed Flare. Annoyed, 029 tried to attack Drive, only for the strong fiery attacks of Drive to make him fall flat on his back, and was soon jettisoned out of the warehouse thanks to his Flare Stream attack. 042 and 088 got back their bearings when 029 was ejected out of a warehouse by the Flare Stream attack from Drive's Max Flare Tire, and it and 088 briefly fight Drive until Drive equips the Funky Spike Tire, and mortally wounds 042 with its Spike Tornado attack, reverting it to its soul form. The Rider switches to the Midnight Shadow Tire, and mortally wounds 088 with its special attack, reverting it to its soul form. 042's soul eventually succumbs to death when 088 was destroyed. Now alone, 029 tried to attack Drive, only for him to reassume Type Speed and pelted the Roidmude with the All Tire Attack, leaving the Roidmude wide open to be destroyed by Drive's SpeeDrop finisher. Shinnosuke felt relieved after he was able to save a life for the first time after his traumatic failure. At night, Kiriko took him to a secret lair, Drive Pit where she and Mr. Belt acted secretly to assist Drive. Despite all red colored victims were reverted to normal, but Shinnosuke knew that the case isn't over. Meanwhile, 029's soul manages to escape the battle. Returning to the Roidmude lair very much exhausted, he is given a Viral Core by Heart to form a new body.
| 2 | "What Is a Kamen Rider?"; Transliteration: "Kamen Raidā to wa Nani ka" (Japanese: 仮面ライダーとはなにか) | Ryuta Tasaki | Riku Sanjo | October 12, 2014 |
Mr. Belt dreamed himself on the night of his death. As three Roidmudes approach him, one of them transformed into a human and begin to kill Belt's human identity, Krim Steinbelt. Kiriko caught a slacking Shinnosuke with the help of Justice Hunter. Shinnosuke begins to doubt himself that using Mr. Belt's power, he could fight the Roidmudes, meaning all of them including the Shift Cars are from the same source. Heart met the Roidmude Commander Brain in a cafe and reported him of his deed: granting Roidmude 029 a new body. In an office, a Cobra Viral Core search through several people in the computer and remorphed back to Roidmude 029 once he got what he needed. Mr. Belt spied on Shinnosuke via Shift Speed Shift Car, whom visited his old friend Akira Hayase and still bore the guilt for the accidents 6 months prior. But Akira never minded it, instead told him to use that guilt as a motivation in his job. After Akira accidentally dropped his packet of painkiller pills, Shinnosuke finally identify the Roidmude's main goal. Returning to the Special Investigation Unit, Shinnosuke revealed that the victims are all mistake from the murder cases. The Roidmude's target was Nobou Masuda, and his main goal is to get healthy human bodies and the victims that turned red was all failures, evident by their medicine packets. Shinnosuke realised the first victim of the Roidmude had his girlfriend missing. With the help of the Special Investigation Unit members, they managed to search the Roidmude's base in a closed amusement park. Roidmude 029 appeared again, revealing that his desire is to collect ideal human parts to create his ideal human body. He evolved into the Iron Roidmude and sent a wave of Heavy Acceleration. Realizing his evolution, Heart and Brain quickly went to the scene. As Iron Roidmude went away, Shinnosuke chased them but stopped by Roidmude 093 and Roidmude 071 until Mr. Belt arrived and Shinnosuke transformed into Drive. He drove the Tridoron and chased them where they blocked him with several obstacles which he managed to get past. With the help from Shift Cars Max Flare, Funky Spike and Midnight Shadow, they destroy 093 and 071. Drive pursued Iron easily with Type Speed Shadow and Type Speed Hunter, blocking his attacks with the Justice Cage and killing him with the JustiSmash Full Throttle. Iron asked him either he is a Kamen Rider before exploded and his Core vanished. Heart and Brain realized that 029/Iron was terminated and called Chase to find out the problem. In the Special Investigation Unit, Shinnosuke asked Kiriko what is the title Kamen Rider meant. She smiled, but try to deny the fact due to her known cold personality. Mr. Belt overheard the argument and decided to call it as Kamen Rider Drive. At night, a woman distraught to find several ghosts flying in the sky and a mysterious Roidmude attack the woman.
| 3 | "Who Stole Her Smile?"; Transliteration: "Dare ga Kanojo no Egao o Ubatta no ka" (Japanese: だれが彼女の笑顔を奪ったのか) | Takayuki Shibasaki | Riku Sanjo | October 19, 2014 |
A new case reported in the Joutoku Museum of Modern Art where Heavy Acceleration waves reported with two female students kidnapped. While Shinnosuke and Kiriko at the cafetaria, a new Shift Car appeared which surprised Kiriko. After investigating the kidnapping at the museum, Genpachiro dismissed it as a normal kidnapping until Kyu related it with a haunted atelier case a week ago. A local housewife reported that she saw a group of female ghosts devoured by a monster. He suspected that same monster might have relation to the current kidnapping case. Soon, Shinnosuke, Kiriko and Kyu went to the atelier and met Kazuhiro Asaya, an artist, whom desired to have Kiriko as his latest model. Nonetheless, he dismissed such fact that his atelier is haunted. As the three went out, an evolved Roidmude appeared out of nowhere and attacked them. The Roidmude slowly turned Kiriko into data stripes until the new Shift Car Dream Vegas came and save her. As Shinnosuke transformed to Drive, he used the new Shift Car. Though he managed to gain the upper hand, but to no avail as his Full Throttle only launched one small coin. The Roidmude escaped while Mr. Belt revealed that Dream Vegas was after the Roidmude that attacked Kiriko during the Global Freeze. The three Roidmude commanders chased one rogue Roidmude that made a wrong attempt of robbery until Chase transformed into Mashin Chaser and destroyed him with Break Up attack. His core was preserved but he managed to tell them to keep an eye on Paint. After a stressed Kiriko left the Drive Pit, Mr. Belt explained her history during the Global Freeze. One night, while on her routine, she was attacked by Roidmude 010 whom nearly converted her into data. She believed Paint Roidmude is the same one she faced sometime ago. It wasn't until Kamen Rider Protodrive saved her. But unlike Shinnosuke, he lacked the ability to destroy their Cores and so he lost his life. Kiriko was later lured by Fujimiya (Kazuhiro's student) into his atelier to reveal the truth. With Kyu's help, Shinnosuke finally solve the case. Kiriko entered Kazuhiro's atelier and discovered that his paintings are converted versions of female victims. As the artist came into his art gallery, Kiriko was dragged away by Fujimiya, before he revealed himself as Roidmude 084 and converted Kiriko into a data for his drawings. Shinnosuke revealed that the faces of the missing women are accurate to Kazuhiro's drawings. The haunted atelier case was about the abducted women tried to escape until 084 recapture them. Yet, the man named Fujimiya never existed and when Kiriko cannot be contacted, this means she was in danger. Shinnosuke transforms into Drive and battle the Roidmude with Spin Mixer Shift Car. Both his body and Core destroyed but several paintings remained meaning he wasn't the only culprit. Mashin Chaser introduce himself and challenged Drive to fight.
| 4 | "What Is the Proud Chaser Thinking About?"; Transliteration: "Hokoritakaki Tsuisekisha wa Nani o Omou no ka" (Japanese: 誇り高き追跡者はなにを思うのか) | Takayuki Shibasaki | Riku Sanjo | October 26, 2014 |
Mashin Chaser easily overpowered Drive as he struggled to protect Kiriko and the captured painting. In the end, they escaped from the battle with Tridoron. The Roidmudes held a meeting in a restaurant to discuss Paint's refusal in his mission. Paint leaves and assure of his success while Brain sent Chase to spy him. As Special Investigation Unit members Shinnosuke and Genpachiro investigate Asaya's atelier, his paintings disappeared, with Asaya revealed that they had been "stolen". Shinnosuke spot several cables in the back and entered his Top Gear state again. Asaya denies all fact that the paintings were kidnapped women but with one that Kiriko stole sometime ago, she sent Rinna to analyse it. The analyse result revealed that the material for the paintings's canvas isn't made from cloth but a conductive compound. To keep the captives in the paintings, electrical charges were made as a barrier. Shinnosuke had witness his cables back on the studio and he was sent to search Asaya while the Unit would search for his paintings. While waiting for Asaya, Shinnosuke witnessed Dream Vegas Shift Car await him too. Back in the Global Freeze, Dream Vegas and Dimension Cab tried to protect Kiriko but Dimension Cab badly hurt and forced to temporarily resigned, much like Shinnosuke and Akira's history. Paint Roidmude was soon spotted and ran away. As Drive chased him, Mashin Chaser stopped the Rider and duel him for a rematch. Mr. Belt summoned a sword which Shinnosuke named Handle-Ken and finally overpowered Chaser. Meanwhile, Rinna and Kyu were patrolling in the street, Asaya revealed himself to Kiriko in a warehouse as Paint/Roidmude 010. He threw Justice Hunter from her and slowly digitized her. Dimension Cab appeared after Drive's Handle Ken unintentionally healed his injuries and assist the Rider. Drive mounted Tridoron and raced to Kiriko after avoiding Chaser. Shinnosuke snuck into Paint's warehouse and smuggled away Paint's drawings into Tridoron while Funky Spike rescued Kiriko. Shinnosuke as Drive outsmarted Paint with Type Speed Cab and Type Speed Vegas. Finally, he destroyed Paint with Turn Slash attack. All of the paintings reverted to their original forms as well as the real Kazuhiro Asaya that Paint imprisoned and imposed as. At night, a muscular man appeared to the Roidmudes and volunteered himself as the Kamen Rider's next opponent.
| 5 | "What Are the Steel Robbers After?"; Transliteration: "Hagane no Gōtōdan wa Nani o Nerau no ka" (Japanese: 鋼の強盗団はなにを狙うのか) | Satoshi Morota | Riku Sanjo | November 9, 2014 |
One day, three Roidmudes ambushed a delivery truck. While the others search in the truck, the leading one, Crush tried to attack its driver until Drive appeared and save him. Drive quickly assumed Type Speed Dump and drove them away despite having little control of it and was secretly spied by Rinna. The previous case is the seventh attack the trio Roidmudes made on delivery trucks and Eiji Kirihara was sent to assist the Special Investigation Unit, at the same time the whole public security seemed to have interest on Kamen Rider. While Crush and his comrades decided to go ambush another delivery truck, Chase stopped them but Brain permit them and in turn hire Chase as their bodyguard. Meeting the Font-R Inc. president, Mitsuru Kuramochi, asking him for the relations of Roidmude's attack. While Kiriko was analysing the number of companies and trucks attack, suddenly a Heavy Acceleration wave was detected from a nearby area. Tomari as Drive and Kiriko rushed to the scene with Tridoron but Mashin Chaser stopped them in the midway. Max Flare appeared and assist Drive but quickly snatched by Chaser and his powers exploited to attack Drive. Mr. Belt analyse that Mashin Chaser seemed to have copied almost all of Protodrive's skill and Drive managed to regain Flare from Chaser. Chaser left while stating that his job was done. Realised this, they quickly rushed to a wrecked delivery truck and found an injured driver. As Chase witnessed this, Heart appeared and present Chase three silver-colored Viral Cores as a gift from him and Brain. At the Unit's base, Eiji wondered the reason for Drive's disappearance for the recent truck attack and how did he even appeared in all Roidmude cases, figuring the latter as someone close to the unit. Furious at Eiji, Genpachiro and Shinnosuke decided to take on the job to guard oncoming delivery trucks. In Tridoron, Kiriko and Shinnosuke grew suspicious of the case since Font-R trucks were more targeted than any others. They received a contact from Eiji of a recent Roidmude attack on a Font-R truck. Shinnosuke as Drive successfully saved Genpachiro and fought the Roidmudes. While his men were fighting, Crush managed to get a strange object hidden in the truck. With this, their objective was done and they were called for a retreat. Drive however managed to kill one of them, Roidmude 060 until Mashin Chaser arrived for a rematch. In order to get himself overpower Drive, Chaser equipped the Spider Viral Core but evenly matched again when their finishers collided. The impact of their finishers ignited Crush's stolen item and threw it off to the sea as it exploded. Drive and Mr. Belt finally realised that the Font-R company tried to smuggle an explosive item. Nonetheless, he picked another bottle of explosive from the stolen briefcase and empowered himself to attack Drive. Drive finally understand the gravity of the situation: the Roidmude trios originally target medical supplement trucks for food but after they discovered and consumed the explosives, they became addicted to it, explaining the reason behind burned marks of the Font-R trucks. Brain appeared and dripped the Rider with a dangerous neurotoxin, causing him to struggle from its effects.
| 6 | "Who Does the Warrior Fight For?"; Transliteration: "Senshi wa Dare no Tame ni Tatakau no ka" (Japanese: 戦士はだれのために戦うのか) | Satoshi Morota | Riku Sanjo | November 16, 2014 |
After being poisoned by Brain, Drive struggles with himself to resist the poison's effect. Kiriko sent Dream Vegas to help him escape from the villains. Drive was washed to a nearby shore and received a painful medical treatment from Mad Doctor Shift Car. He found himself at Kotoha Hospital and since the Font-R company was found with the explosives, the Special Investigation Unit is currently interrogate him. In the Unit's office, Eiji officially disbanded the team and took over their office while Rinna still retained her position. Crush and 074 went out, bringing along a large number of Viral Cores as they pursue the Font-R president Kuramochi for more explosives. At the cafeteria, Genpachiro finally accepted the existence of Roidmudes to Kyu and Kiriko came in to ask for their help. While Shinnosuke doubted Chase's claim that justice never existed, Captain Honganji gave Shinnosuke Yuuzou Ichikawa's number, the man that saved him from the shore. Contacting Ichikawa, Shinnosuke thanked him for the rescue but Ichikawa instead said his heroic deed earlier was from his inspiration on Drive, revealing him to be the driver that Drive saved before thus restoring Shinnosuke's faith in humanity. Ichikawa however spotted the president being attacked by the same Roidmude gang from before and caught himself in a Heavy Acceleration wave. Shinnosuke entered "top-gear" state, and rushed to the Unit's office, where he ordered Rinna to restart the program as she agreed. While Shinnosuke off to Font-R building, Eiji tried to protest but Kiriko, Genpachiro and Kyu stopped him, revealing that Eiji was all along bribed by Kuramochi to protect the smuggled explosives via the Unit and Kamen Rider Drive. But when the unit found his secret, Eiji tried to shut the team. Rinna revealed her tricks to Eiji and played along with his plans while instructed Kiriko to investigate the latter's relation with Font-R. As Shinnosuke drove to the building, Chase stopped him in the midway and criticize his desire to protect humans but Shinnosuke said otherwise and gained his passion to assume Type Wild and fight. Using Type Wild Dump, he execute DriRumble to defeat Mashin Chaser and continue his journey to Font-R. Meanwhile, several portion of Font-R building was severely destroyed and the Roidmudes took their supply of explosives. Drive appeared and saved the president from being killed. Roidmude 074 devoured three Viral Cores and transformed into a Giant Cobra Roidmude. With Tridoron changed into Type Wild, Drive used it to attack the giant cobra before eliminating it with Rumble Dump. With Crush left, Rinna appeared and gave Drive Type Wild the Handle-Ken which Mr. Belt left and finished the Roidmude with Drift Smasher. At Drive Pit, Mr. Belt revealed Rinna as his secret assistant which further angered Shinnosuke. In a newspaper office, the higher faculties thanked Kusaka for a new scoop for their newspaper article: exposure of Font-R's crimes and their factory's destruction. As Kusaka was praised, a newspaper staff envied the man.
| 7 | "How Was That Decisive Moment Captured?"; Transliteration: "Ketteiteki Shunkan wa Ika ni Satsuei-sareta no ka" (Japanese: 決定的瞬間はいかに撮影されたのか) | Kyohei Yamaguchi | Keiichi Hasegawa | November 23, 2014 |
Three cases of building collapse was reported with no casualties. Yet, all of them were still under construction by the Kaishima City Construction. Since Shinnosuke currently visiting his former partner Hayase in a hospital, Genpachiro and Kiriko departed with Honganji realised that the Special Investigation Unit's budget had been cut, true to his fortune telling him that he would face financial problems. After visiting Hayase, Shinnosuke was tailed by Kenta, a reporter from Touto Times newspaper office and hold him. The reporter wanted to tail Shinnosuke to get a scoop for the rumoured Kamen Rider if he tracked a Special Investigation Unit member. Shinnosuke released him and warned to keep away for his own safety. After a report that a current building in construction collapsed, Shinnosuke rushed to the scene and investigate. Meeting the reporter again, he tried to dissipate him until a Roidmude appeared and attack the site. Shinnosuke transformed into Drive and assumed Type Wild to fight him. The Roidmude materialize a steel beam to fall on Genpachiro to distract Drive while he escaped. As Shinnosuke exited the site, he witnessed a photographer from a top of the building. While Shinnosuke and Burning Solar Shift Car lay down under the sun, the Kenta thanked Shinnosuke for his reports while showing him the recent newspaper. Watching the snapshot of the collapsed building, the reporter revealed its photographer as Kusaka, the finest one whom recently getting better by time. He went away, but not before he thanked Shinnosuke for the info and swear to catch the scoop of Kamen Rider. While Kiriko appeared, she used Burning Solar's solar panel to dazzle him on revenge for rejecting her flowers during his "Top Gear" state. With Kyu's help, he investigated all of the snapshots of the destroyed buildings. They were taken by Kusaka, the photographer from Touto Times and the pictures were accurate shots made on right time and setting, meaning the case was no coincidence. They went to the Totou Times office and asked him but he denied all the facts. As he left, Kiriko sent Midnight Shadow to trail him. Kenta revealed himself and offered their help as they tracked him to Towall Corporation building. Finding Yoshida, Kenta and Kusaka's mentor and a former worker of Totou Times (now a security guard) whom Kenta met in the past, Kenta revealed to the policemen that a year ago, Kusaka and Kenta were chasing an exclusive story, which related to Kaishima Buildings' shoddy construction method. They managed to gather strong evidence but their stories were rejected and Kusaka's photos were labelled fake. To ensure their innocence, Yoshida took the blame and quit his job. Kenta denied the fact that Towall Corporation's building would be his target since would never sacrifice Yoshida for a scoop. Eventually, Shinnosuke managed to gather all the clues and found the answer which Kenta knew but suddenly a Heavy Acceleration Wave was released. As warned by Mr. Belt, the enemy is on the top of the building. The duo policemen reached up and found Kusaka trying to take a snapshot of a destroyed building but he wasn't the Roidmude, but instead, the real one appeared as Roidmude 033/Scooper Roidmude. He revealed that his method of evolution was only made by fuelling himself with human desires. Scooper took a picture of a neighbouring building and pinpoint its weak spot to destroy it until Drive and the Shift Cars stopped him. Chase stopped him and took over Scooper's role as he and Kusaka escaped and Mashin Chaser fought Drive with Chaser Spider and Chaser Cobra. Before he would finish Shinnosuke with Chaser Bat, Kiriko stepped in and tried to shield him.
| 8 | "What Is the Secret That Dwells in the Heart?"; Transliteration: "Sono Mune ni Yadoru Himitsu to wa Nani ka" (Japanese: その胸に宿る秘密とはなにか) | Kyohei Yamaguchi | Keiichi Hasegawa | November 30, 2014 |
Chaser Bat fired his arrow, but as it is about to hit Kiriko, he mentally navigated it to miss his target, left them unharmed in the end. Furious of his actions earlier, he yelled under his anger for somehow remember Kiriko. In the Drive Pit, Shinnosuke awakened after 15 hours of losing consciousness. While Kiriko leaves, Shinnosuke wondered the reason behind her stoic personality which he suddenly realise it was because of him restricting Kiriko to come along in his visit to Hayase. Midnight Shadow Shift Car was tailing Kusaka when suddenly Roidmude 033/Scooper fired him to prevent Drive's interference. As Shinnosuke returned to the Special Investigation Unit's base, he was shocked to discover Kenta taking photographs of the office. Honganji revealed that he purposely let him doing it since they had low budgets recently. Kiriko reported Midnight Shadow had lost sight of him. At Touto Times office, Kenta revealed Kusaka's earliest work, the explosion of the Font-R factory. Ever since that, he became obsessed with fame. Kenta admitted that he was trying to search Kamen Rider so that he can save his friend, Kusaka, whom was under influence of Scooper. He also believed the whole event was his fault since he had given up the Kaishima Building case a year ago and no matter how much photos they took, they would be accused for fraud. Kyu contacted them and revealed several infos. All of the collapse buildings belonged to politicians that affiliated with Kaishima City Construction. All were destroyed in the order they were built and the final target is an international sport stadium. While Shinnosuke drove them to the place, Chase stopped them. Shinnosuke ordered Kiriko to take his place while he fought Chase. As Mr. Belt arrived, Shinnosuke and Chase transformed to fight, using Drive Type Wild and Chaser Tune Chaser Spider. Arriving at the stadium, Kenta apologized to Kusaka but he refused and had Scooper terminated them before he revealed Kusaka as his victim as well. Rinna appeared in the battle and gave Drive a new gun, Door-Ju. The fight continues but as Chaser sees Kiriko's illusion, he retreated. Arriving at the sport stadium, Drive first overwhelmed him with Tridoron Type Wild and finished him as Type Speed via Full Throttle Rider Shooting. Before Kusaka was brought to custody, he redeemed his actions and along with Kenta decided to uncover Kamen Riders' mystery for their next article project. Kiriko finally able to meet Hayase in person which Shinnosuke promised to Hayase but never fulfilled it. Hayase finally figured out that he didn't wanted Kiriko to find out Shinnosuke's secret. Mashin Chaser began questioning himself of the Kamen Rider and his true identity.
| 9 | "How Can I Get Used to the Cool Body?"; Transliteration: "Dō Sureba Kūru Bodi ni Nareru no ka" (Japanese: どうすればクールボディになれるのか) | Osamu Kaneda | Riku Sanjo | December 7, 2014 |
In Mr. Belt's hideout, he presents to Shinnosuke, Kiriko, and Rinna three new Shift Cars; Fire Braver, Rolling Gravity, and Shift Technic (whom Mr. Belt communicates through), declaring that it's time for Drive to use a new form again. Under direction of Mr. Belt, Shinnosuke must feel "cool" to use the Shift Car, but fails. According to both Fire Braver and Special Investigation Unit, a lot of house fire accidents reported with a Slowdown effect occurring at the same time. The team arrived at the recent accident place and made several investigation. There, Shinnosuke and others met a child residence named Teruhiko whom claimed that he heard a siren noise around 8 pm. As Shinnosuke and Kiriko tried to ask nearby civilians, they released a Slowdown wave and tried to flee until the two cops chased them, revealing to be two Roidmudes 037 and 103. Mr. Belt arrived and Shinnosuke transformed into Drive to fight the Roidmudes until 024 joined the fray and evolved into Volt Roidmude. Drive summoned the Door-Ju but Volt's electricity gave him a hard time. Under the advice of Mr. Belt, Drive tried to assume Type Technic while still using his cool outlook but failed again. In the end, he used Type Wild to finish off 037 via Handle-Ken. The remaining Roidmudes escaped and Drive used Mad Doctor to cure injured civilians. Mashin Chaser tried to execute the two for their failures but Volt managed to think of an excuse, leaving them unharmed though Chase was sceptical that his little change in attitude might caused by his encounter from Kiriko. Teruhiko spied the whole event and tried to flee but he was quickly caught. The Investigation Unit discovered that the house fire tragedies were came from electrical fire due to battery overload. Using the Slowdown reports, Kyu managed to track the Slowdown source. Shinnosuke and Kiriko found Teruhiko at the location, only to discover that the boy was trapped to a strange machine. Roidmude 103 appeared out of nowhere and grabbed the machine's main component. Volt introduced himself to them, revealing his intention to create a city-wide fire with the device. Angry at his plan, Shinnosuke managed to bond with the Shift Car Technic and gain access to Drive Type Technic. Using Technic's mastery in technology, he release Teruhiko from his electric prison and destroy the machine while outsmarted the two Roidmudes. They tried to flee but Drive and Tridoron cornered them, though unaware that 103 escaped carrying the important part of Volt's device. Drive used Rolling Gravity's 10-ton Weight to imprison Volt inside a gravity field before finishing him with the Door-Ju. Despite Volt's destruction along with his Core, but a restrained 103 brought an important part of the device to Heart before fading away with his Core. Teruhiko agreed to keep Shinnosuke's identity a secret and was given Drive's insignia with his fixed robot model as a gift.
| 10 | "What Is in the Belt's Past?"; Transliteration: "Beruto no Kako ni Nani ga Atta no ka" (Japanese: ベルトの過去になにがあったのか) | Osamu Kaneda | Riku Sanjo | December 14, 2014 |
Special Investigation Unit discovered that Shinnosuke's birthday is around the Christmas Eve, December 24 but he didn't excited about it due to receiving only one gift that represent both birthday and Christmas gift each year. While debating for Shinnosuke's gift, suddenly a strange blackout occur within the city which even affected several cars and even backup electricity supplies. Mr. Belt and Tridoron seemed unaffected due to their Core Driviars. Somewhere in the location of Volt Roidmude's demise, Volt was revived again when several lightning bolts struck his device. Back at the Unit's base, they realised that Volt was seen again by several citizens in his human form, Goro Minami. According to Genpachiro, the real Goro Minami died three months earlier and Volt also supposedly met his demise after Drive killed him. Searching for clues regarding the late author in a library, they found his final works, The Dark Eve which was about a mad revolutionist creating a city-wide blackout, hinting Volt's plan but the story remained unfinished since he had died sometime later. Chase appeared in the library and challenged Shinnosuke to a fight. When Heart tried to join the fray, Mr. Belt orders them to retreat. At the Drive Pit, he revealed to Shinnosuke that Heart was his murderer during his final days as a human named Krim Steinbelt. Bringing Shinnosuke to his mansion's ruin he revealed his history. Fifteen years ago, his friend Dr. Banno made three advanced androids called Roidmudes. However, when his development had hit the dead end, he pleaded Krim's help as he gave the Core Driviars but soon it made the first three Roidmudes rebel and kill Dr. Banno as well as Krim Steinbelt. Fortunately, he uploaded consciousness into the Drive Driver. Before Global Freeze, he managed to call forth Protodrive and beginning the operation to destroy all Roidmudes. Revisiting Volt Ridmude's hideout, Kiriko stumbled upon Goro Minami's magazine when suddenly a Heavy Acceleration wave released. Volt communicated Kiriko via a phone, telling that he had "no longer existed" in this world but his creation would exist to relaunch the Dark Eve and cancelled the Heavy Acceleration wave. She passed the information to Shinnosuke but as he went out, Heart stopped him and revealed that he was the first Roidmude to evolve and "killed" Protodrive. Refusing Mr. Belt's orders, Shinnosuke as Drive fighting Heart even with the help of Shift Cars and Tridoron but he resisted and became stronger compared to his earlier days when killing Protodrive. Heart lifts Drive and prepared to initiate Dead Zone but Drive as Type Technic pumped electricity to accelerate the process, willing to sacrifice his own life as he ordered Belt to leave.
| 11 | "Who Can Prevent the Dark Eve?"; Transliteration: "Ankoku no Ibu o Fusegu no wa Dare ka" (Japanese: 暗黒の聖夜を防ぐのはだれか) | Osamu Kaneda | Riku Sanjo | December 21, 2014 |
Drive Type Technique continuously pumped electricity into Heart, trying to sacrifice himself to destroy the Roidmude before Chase used Execution Spider and separated them. Heart was saved in the nick of time while Drive was seemingly killed from the explosion. Members of the Special Investigation Unit figured out Volt's plan is to create a mass blackout. With the police forces refuse to believe Genpachiro, the team decided to seek out the Volt Roidmude while in his civilian form. In Krim's underground base, Shinnosuke was revealed to have survived the explosion while being spirited away by three Shift Cars; Deco Traveler, Road Winter and Colorful Commercial (this Shift Car also creates a decoy to cover up their operation). Shinnosuke realised that Volt's blackout plan was based on one of the late author Goro Minami's works and search for clues which lead him to one of the writer's acquaintances, Koya Nishihori, the same criminal that Shinnosuke encountered back in the day before Global Freeze happened. With the help of Jun Honganji, he managed to gain access to Koya's prison cell and get the story's ending. Shinnosuke picked up Kiriko and explained that Volt's plan would be staged on the Electro Mall. Once they arrived, they witnessed Volt and tried to stop him. However, the Roidmude revealed himself not to be the real Volt, but instead a recreation of the original template. Before Shinnosuke as Drive would face Volt, Brain and Chase interfere, leaving Kiriko to deal with Volt. After setting up his plan, Volt consumed three Spider Viral Cores and morphed into a giant Spider to battle Tridoron. Touched by Drive's plea to step aside for the good of many, Chase releases him but in return having himself attacked by a mad Brain. As Kiriko is about to be killed by Volt, an unknown figure saved her before Drive Technique appeared. Drive used Tridoron to reduce Volt back to his original state and destroy him while Kiriko destroys his device. With the two celebrated their victory, Chase discovers his Roidmude form and number, 000 after receiving damage from Brain's attack. Nonetheless from their defeat, the Roidmudes' main goal was accomplished: to revive one of their comrades, Medic. When Shinnosuke arrived at a dinner that Kiriko reserved in a restaurant, he realized that his birthday party, Christmas party and the Special Investigation Unit's year end party were all combined into one celebration much to his distraught though he accepted it much later. While Mr. Belt and all of the Shift Cars watched the party from afar, Chase/Roidmude Proto-Zero witnessed his own number designation in disbelief.
| 12 | "Where Did the White Kamen Rider Come From?"; Transliteration: "Shiroi Kamen Raidā wa Doko kara Kita no ka" (Japanese: 白い仮面ライダーはどこから来たのか) | Hidenori Ishida | Riku Sanjo | December 28, 2014 |
A police meeting was held where Kinzo Hanamura, a 64-year-old victim, was shown to have a blown on his head. Said victim is a real estate speculator who gained the reputation as bad as a gangster. Yet, a lot of people seemed to hold grudges upon his showing numerous suspects could be the convict. Genpachiro Otta revealed that Heavy Acceleration reports also concluded meaning the case involved in a Roidmude attack but his words became a laughing material to police forces since Genpachiro is currently affiliated with the Special Investigation Unit. He express his anger at the unit and swears to prove his theory to the police. Two of the team's members, Captain Honganji and Kiriko took a day off since Kiriko is frantically made preparations for her little brother's comeback from America. Genpachiro and Shinnosuke investigate the crime scene but no sense of Density Shift particles even numerous peoples in Kinzo's house claimed its presence. A strange photographer appeared out of nowhere and took an embarrassing picture of Shinnosuke while declaring a competition to catch the culprit first. He quickly disappeared via numerous jumps and back-flips. Genpachiro managed to found an eyewitness whom claimed to spot a figure moving in a Heavy Acceleration at Kinzo's house. The figure himself is Naoki Todagawa, a Kuradawa Industry worker as he run from the two police after being spotted. Todagawa armed himself with a metal pipe and runs after emitting a Heavy Acceleration wave. Todagawa runs into a hiding spot and later approached as a Roidmude while firing multiple bullet shots. As Genpachiro about to fall from a higher ground, Shinnosuke managed to get down safely by Shift Cars' tracks, transform into Drive Type Technique, and fought the Roidmude before he escaped. Despite falling from a great height, the Heavy Acceleration's effect slows the impact time for Genpachiro to land safely though he manages to get a glimpse of Drive before losing consciousness. As Shinnosuke de-transformed, the mysterious photographer capture silently took a picture of him. Back at the Special Investigation Unit's base, Genpachiro excitedly shared his news of the Roidmude's identity and his glimpse of the Kamen Rider. His depictions however a combination of Drive's Type Speed and Type Technique, since he can't clearly get a full view of the Rider's full appearance in all of the Roidmude cases. Shinnosuke and Rinna however quietly relieved since his false depiction didn't blown his cover. Outside, with Kyu's help, he searched an article of Naoki Todagawa, where the man firstly worked for Kinzo Hanamura before he was remained homeless. It was odd since a Roidmude tried to impersonate an average civilian. The mysterious photographer appeared again and toys with Kyu by turning his Roidmude snapshot into a paper plane, causing him to chase all over to the sea. He leaves while knowing Shinnosuke's identity while his paper planed-Roidmude snapshot turned into a teasing note. Genpachiro reported to Shinnosuke that he found Todagawa's hiding spot as Shinnosuke and the mysterious photographer rushed to the scene. While Todagawa was snacking, Genpachiro appeared and tried to arrest him. The man released another Heavy Acceleration through his bracelet but Genpachiro seemed unaffected thanks to Rinna's anti Density Shift backpack. His bracelet broke down and the Heavy Acceleration stopped. Shinnosuke arrived in his "top gear" mode, revealing that Todagawa and the Roidmude were not the same person by judging their hand usage: Todagawa is right handed and the Roidmude is left handed. But before he would go to the next conclusion, the mysterious photographer knocked away all his flashbacks. He revealed that Todagawa turned down Hanamura's offer to do some dirty work and in conclusion, his home was burned, resulted him taking refuge in an abandoned hall. He wanted revenge and one day, given a bracelet that able to release Heavy Acceleration wave by a Roidmude. A Heavy Acceleration Wave was released, slowing everyone but Shinnosuke and the mysterious photographer escaped. Mr. Belt arrived in Tridoron and Shinnosuke transform to battle the threat. The Roidmude claimed that Japan's Kamen Rider was worthless, meaning that Shinnosuke is not the only one. Kiriko appeared after being called by someone and the photographer revealed himself with a graceful introduction by Amazing Circus, an American Shift Car. He revealed his belt with multiple Shift Cars like devices appeared out of nowhere and transformed, declaring himself as Kamen Rider Mach. Mach fought the newly arrived Gunman Roidmude easily with his features and his Zenrin Shooter. After Gunman took cover, he assumed Mach Magarl and blow him out. Finally, he used Full Throttle to execute Kick Macher on Gunman, ending his threat. His Core survived and Medic, a new Roidmude managed to regain it back while disappeared into thin air. After a brief reunion, Kiriko and Mr. Belt revealed his name as Go Shijima, Kiriko's younger brother much to Shinnosuke's shock. At the Roidmude's base, Medic gave Gunman a new body and Heart assist him in his new plan by sending Chase and Brain as his teammate. Gunman even introduce his younger brother, Roidmude 018, whom also gave them a warm welcoming.
| 13 | "Why Won't My Little Brother Put On the Brakes?"; Transliteration: "Watashi no Otōto ni wa Naze Burēki ga Nai no ka" (Japanese: 私の弟にはなぜブレーキがないのか) | Hidenori Ishida | Riku Sanjo | January 11, 2015 |
At the Drive Pit, Mr. Belt contacted his mentor, Professor Harley Hendrickson where he asked why Go returned to Japan. Harley furiously revealed that Go went out in the middle of his training and requested the team to look after him. According to Rinna, Mach is Harley's new system which was said to surpass Krim's Drive system. Kiriko furiously kicked the whole pit and yelled at Mr. Belt for hiding the fact that he planned to use her brother as his new candidate without her knowledge. Go even teases her sister and Shinnosuke (much to Rinna's jealousy) and ended up with both of them argued. The two siblings visited their father's memorial, Go resolved not to live with Kiriko due to his own behaviour and for her sister's safety, since they only had each other after their parents' death. At the Special Investigation Unit, a group of robbers broadcast their next robbery Kuruma Credit Union and challenged the police forces to stop them since they had the same Slowdown bracelet which previously worn by Naoki Todagawa. Combined with Kyu's mentions that no Slowdown detections on radar lately, this means that Naoki's case was an example. About half an our before the robbery, Genpachiro and Shinnosuke interrogate Naoki on the information for whom had selling the Slowdown wristbands. Naoki revealed that he had no idea on who sold him the item, meaning those wristbands will automatically trigger a memory eraser to assure its secret. In the Roidmude's hideout, Medic revealed that Gunman and Roidmude 018 impersonated as a pair of major underworld traffickers. 018 sells the device and Gunman acted as his bodyguard. Heart sent Chase to guard 018 until he evolves. Chase agreed but he grew skeptical with his number and the point of him had no memories of Global Freeze. Genpachiro hired SWAT officers at Kuruma and the robbers on their way. But Go/Mach stopped them, released his own Heavy Acceleration and rob them of their Slowdown wristbands. Shinnosuke/Drive arrived and stopped him. Go surrenders as he switch off the Heavy Acceleration. He angrily scolded Go for using it despite his good intentions but Go calmly question him that they were even with the Roidmudes since both are powered by the same source. Captain Honganji returned from his vacation and Go appeared in the Special Investigation Unit by revealing his snapshot of Mach. Shinnosuke and the Drive Pit crews brought him away as Go explained that he got his Signal Bikes to capture his picture. Mr. Belt explained that, Mach Driver Honoh was made based on the aspects of Drive Driver but it also had its own AI much like Krim's role in Drive Driver. Shinnosuke suddenly realised something and sent the Shift Cars in a search for Go. Go at the same time quickly infiltrated the Roidmudes' base and destroy their Slowdown wristbands. As Gunman, 018 and Chase about to kill him, he was saved by Kiriko and Shinnosuke. The latter revealed that Go/Mach used Heavy Acceleration to remove the trio robbers' bracelet to interrogate their secrets before they lost their memory, since he had familiar with their operations back at America. Shinnosuke as Drive transformed and battle Mashin Chaser while the Roidmude brothers attempted to attack the Shijima siblings. Mr. Belt realised that Mashin Chaser's number is 000/Protozero, hinting an upcoming secret. Signal Bikes came to aid Go and remove 018's Slowdown wristbands, figuring out that 018 had produced them. Go transformed into Mach and outsmart the two brothers. He assumed Mach Kikern and summon a demon beast to attack them. He switched to Mach Tomarle and finally Mach Kaksarn. He used Full Throttle to destroy their bodies followed by their Core as Mach Magarl. Before Mashin Chaser could attack Mach, Medic appeared and spirited him away. At the cafetaria, Shinnosuke started to accept Go's friendship along with the term big brother.
| 14 | "Who Is the Black Shadow Chasing Her?"; Transliteration: "Kanojo o Nerau Kuroi Kage wa Dare ka" (Japanese: 彼女を狙う黒い影はだれか) | Satoshi Morota | Keiichi Hasegawa | January 18, 2015 |
One night, popular model Lira Nanao was walking on a street when a mysterious person contacted her, claims to be her biggest fan. The caller released Heavy Acceleration waves and a hooded Roidmude appears in front of her. At the same time, Chase approaches Kiriko with Shinnosuke and Go sensing her in danger as the latter rushing to her. With memories of Kiriko appearing in Chase's mind, he demanded her answers as to why but Go arrived and stopped Chase, who then left the scene. Lira visited the Special Investigation Unit with her manager and reported the event that happened last night. Worried of her safety from the stalker/Roidmude, she asked for their help which the team happily obliged. With another rogue Roidmude reported, Brain sent Chase to deal after him. Chase agreed while struggling with several memories from the Global Freeze. Medic warned Brain that Chase would regain his past memories anytime, which Brain assured to keep an eye on. While Lira was filming a commercial at her studio, Go reveals to the Unit another suspicious stalker, Tadashi Sunahara, which might have been the key to solving the case. Shinnosuke and Go then spot a man wearing a fedora secretly stalking on them and chased after him while Genpachiro and Kiriko found Tadashi and arrested him under suspicion of being a Roidmude. As the stalker hides from Go and Shinnosuke, a Heavy Acceleration wave was released, slowing everyone but the Riders. At that time, a cloaked Roidmude appears and poisons Tadashi with his talons before getting away. Shinnosuke checked on Tadashi and spotted a tarot card beside him marked "The Fool". Go pursued the cloaked Roidmude as Mach, changing into Mach Kaksarn but lost him while finishing his roll call. To ensure her safety, Lira was given a day off by her manager. At the Special Investigation Unit's base, Kyu gained the suspect's information: the stalker is Koichi Sakaki, a former make-up artist who began stalking women after losing his job. Genpachiro and Shinnosuke found Koichi, who was jailed after he was caught stalking again. Shinnosuke however suspected that Koichi had purposely lured them here to give his doppelgänger, a Bat-Class Roidmude, some time to search for her, to which Koichi confirmed to be correct. Furious, they rushed out quickly to find Lira. Koichi's Roidmude counterpart pursued Lira at her apartment, revealing his true form as Roidmude 069. Go and Kiriko arrived at the apartment, but before they could take any action, the previous cloaked Roidmude, Roidmude 096, protected her from the maniac. It was revealed that Roidmude 096 was trying to protect her last night from 069. Lira quickly realised something about him but he retreated after Kiriko and the Shift Cars attacked him. Shinnosuke joined the fray and transformed into battle. Drive used Type Technic Winter and froze 069. But before they could finished 069 off, Chase appeared and fought them while struggling with Mr. Belt's voice in his memories. Brain arrived and unfroze 069 to evolve him into a Giant Bat Roidmude. 069 flew away and took Kiriko hostage. While Drive Type Wild Wrecker hooked himself on the monster, Mach and Chaser mounted their bikes and chased him. A combination system was activated, ejecting Chase from his bike, which combined with Mach's to form the Ride Crosser. Mach drove the Ride Crosser and attacked the Roidmude, saving Drive and Kiriko. He finally finished the Roidmude and his Core in an aerial combat. As Ride Crosser splits back into the two bikes, Chase wonders how it was able to link with Ride Macher. Brain appeared and revealed the truth: Chase was Proto-Zero, the Roidmude that aided the humans during the Global Freeze, and was also what the villain Roidmudes named the "Kamen Rider": Protodrive. Kiriko and Chase receive this news with shock.
| 15 | "When Will These Feelings Reach You?"; Transliteration: "Sono Omoi ga Todoku no wa Itsu ka" (Japanese: その想いが届くのはいつか) | Satoshi Morota | Keiichi Hasegawa | January 25, 2015 |
Traumatized by the fact that Chase was once Protodrive, he reverted to his Roidmude form and screamed in pain. Nonetheless, Mach pursued him in their bikes but he escaped. Shocked by the twisted turn of events, Kiriko tried to figure out a way to get him to their side but Go disagrees, saying that all Roidmudes are the enemies of humanity. As Kiriko asked Lila about her connection with Roidmude 096, Shinnosuke was called by Genpachiro to the prison after an attack happened, where Koichi was held in suspended animation like Sunahara earlier, along with a Tarot card marked "The Chariot" left there. Lila's manager discovered that she and Kiriko had gone missing thus he and Go went to search for them. Go tried to use his Signal Bikes to help look for Kiriko but they are stuck to their abilities(Magarl can't stop curving and Tomarle stops whenever a "stop" sign appears in front of him), all while Roidmude 096 overseers him. Lila and Kiriko, who were previously suspected to be missing, were actually at a park. Lila suspected that Roidmude 096 might have been a fortuneteller who saved her from suicide from a long time ago. Meanwhile at the Special Investigation Unit's base, Honganji recognized the two cards earlier from Hiroki Nikaido, a fortuneteller whose prediction is 100% accurate, and disappeared a year ago. Lila revealed that she and Hiroki were in a relationship once. However, as her acting career became more successful, they hardly saw each other. Her manager then arrived and tried to escort her back to work but Roidmude 096 interfered and poisoned him. Go quickly dashed into the scene and transformed into Mach. Before he could end 096's life, the Heavy Acceleration stopped, enabling Lila to stop Mach in time for the Roidmude to escape. Another Tarot card was left at the scene, marked The Hierophant. Shinnosuke arrived at the scene and deduced that 096 is Hiroki. Kiriko tried to use this to prove that humans could possibly co-exist peacefully with Roidmudes, which Go disagreed with again. Meanwhile, Chaser was about to be disposed of by Brain. Brain stated that another reset of his Roidmude form would not be possible, as he was the one who previously reset Chase, who however managed to regain a portion of his past memories. Medic then offered to reset Chase herself, but in a more risky and dangerous way, along with Heart's approval of the plan. Shinnosuke and Kiriko investigated Hiroki's abandoned room to search for clues. According to the apartment's landlady, sometime ago while she was sweeping the stairs, Lila's manager argued with Hiroki and wanted to end their relationship, saying that it was to ensure Lila's success in her career. Finding a key that led to Lila's old apartment, they found Hiroki's sets of Tarot cards and Lila's diary which revealed a shocking truth. Shinnosuke, Kiriko and Go called Lila to the same park that Lila and Hiroki first met and showed her her old diary. The truth was that, sometime ago at their old meeting spot, Hiroki decided to end their relationship under orders of her manager. She wasn't able to accept it and attempted suicide but accidentally threw Hiroki into the sea. Traumatized from her actions, Roidmude 096 absorbed her trauma and her memories as a data for his human form. Roidmude 096 appeared as Shinnosuke and Go transformed to fight him. Both Riders finished him with Double Rider Kick. As the whole event seemed to be over, Chase appeared in front of them, seemingly appearing more twisted than before and mercilessly attacked the Riders. Kiriko tried to make him remember his old memories but her actions were futile. Medic and Brain appeared, with the latter ordering Chase to kill Kiriko, however Drive interfered, saving Kiriko's life. As Brain was about to finish Mach, the Rider took Shift Max Flare that Drive dropped and transformed into Mach Moerl. Mach successfully burnt Brain and got the upper hand of the battle until Medic teleported the Roidmudes back to their base. Picking up the fallen cards from 096, Kiriko realised that there was one card missing and that was the card marked The World. This represented Hiroki's true feelings towards Lila. As Shinnosuke explains to Go that Kiriko will not give up on Chase, the missing card marked The World floats underneath the sea.
| 16 | "Why Is Rinna Sawagami Fidgeting?"; Transliteration: "Sawagami Rinna wa Naze Sowasowa Shiteita no ka" (Japanese: 沢神りんなはなぜソワソワしていたのか) | Kyohei Yamaguchi | Riku Sanjo | February 1, 2015 |
Ever since last month, 8 women had lost their money from their bank accounts. At first, the case is dismissed as a fraud case until all of the victims were hospitalized in comatose state and for some reason, they would awaken and go crazy. All of the victims were clients to an entrepreneur Shu Amagi (the man that Shinnosuke, Genpachiro and Detective Misaki tracked earlier), who runs a popular matchmaking service called Lover's Castle. Despite this, no evidence has been found proving Shu to be a Roidmude. At the same time, Honganji takes a day off to strengthen relations with his daughter after a small family issue. While Shinnosuke, Kiriko and Mr. Belt notice that Rinna is acting very suspiciously, Go dashes in and reveals an interesting piece of information: members of Lover's Castle hold a huge ceremony each month, with the next one going to be held the next day. After getting Shu to let them join in the ceremony, Shinnosuke and Kiriko drive out when Chase jumped in front of Tridoron and battles Shinnosuke. Even with Mach's assistance, the two were easily outmatched. Heart appeared, as Mr. Belt expressed his anger for turning Proto-Zero into a killing machine but Chaser thought it as "freedom" from being used as humanity's tool. Just as Heart was about to transform, Deco Traveler comes in and keeps Chaser busy for the Riders to escape. Brain gives Heart the data for the Special Investigation Unit, suspecting that one of them is Drive and plots to eliminate and/or expose his human identity. But with none of his comrades agreeing with his plan, he gets pretty nervous until Heart calms him. Meanwhile, Kiriko is testing out modified bullets that can penetrate Roidmude skin, along with boots that have similar kicking powers to Drive's, both developed by Rinna. Rinna quickly fled away, leaving the Shift Deadheat (a new Shift Car/Signal Bike hybrid) that Prof. Harley ordered her to finish incomplete. Detective Misaki furiously coerced the whole Unit to investigate Lover's Castle when a metal spoon dropped, making her crazy which made her comatose and hospitalized. Genpachiro deduced that all the earlier victims turned crazy after hearing a metallic sound. While the party at the Lover's Castle began, Kiriko and Shinnosuke followed the act to find their "partner". Shinnosuke met a woman, who was surprisingly revealed to be Rinna. Both of them reacted in shock, with Rinna running away while Shinnosuke tries to explain the situation. While searching for clues, Kiriko hears a voice leading her to Chase. But as she speaks his name, "Chase" wondered why she would mention the Grim Reaper, exposing his true identity, the Voice Roidmude. She used her special boots to attack Voice, with the sound of her gun loud enough for Shinnosuke and Go to come for her. Shinnosuke explained that Voice/Shu Amagi hypnotized women with his hypnotic voice to make them see him as their ideal man while taking advantage of this to rob their money. Anyone who is affected by his voice would be sensitive to metal clattering sounds, with Detective Misaki being one of the victims affected. The reason why Kiriko was not affected as much was because she was wearing ear plugs. Despite it seeming easy for Mach Kikern to handle Voice alone, but when two other Roidmudes join him, Shinnosuke/Drive assists Mach in the battle. Before Mach could destroy Voice, Heart, having reached his Dead Zone, arrives and overpowers Mach. Drive had no choice but to summon the unfinished Shift Deadheat and assume Type Deadheat, knowing the risk that he would likely become like Heart. Using this form, he surpassed Heart and throws Voice into a wall. After that, he finishes Roidmude 046 and 085 while unaware of Voice's escape. After the battle, Type Deadheat becomes haywire which causes Drive to enter Dead Zone and go out of control, as Shinnosuke begs Mach to stop him. Elsewhere, Rinna falls victim to Voice's ability, and sees a young man, seemingly from her past, staggering and clutching his chest in pain. She walks forward, oblivious to the danger she is putting herself in.
| 17 | "Who Will Control the Deadheat?"; Transliteration: "Deddohīto o Seisuru no wa Dare ka" (Japanese: デッドヒートを制するのはだれか) | Kyohei Yamaguchi | Riku Sanjo | February 8, 2015 |
With Drive Type Deadheat gone haywire, he remembers how his previous battle with Heart ended, so he requests Mach to use a finisher to stop him. Mach inserts Signal Tomarle into Zenrin Shooter and performs a Full Throttle to put an end to it. Kiriko removes Shift Deadheat from the Shift Brace, cancelling Drive's transformation, with Shinnosuke lying on the ground, laughing. Elsewhere, Heart is also lying on the ground, with Chase offering to call Medic. As Go and Kiriko escorted an exhausted Shinnosuke, they spotted Rinna with an unknown man, whom turned out to be Voice Roidmude and escaped. Under the assumption that she had fallen under Voice's trance, Rinna was chained to a chair at the Special Investigation Unit's office for a while. Rinna protested to this, while asking Kiriko to free her from the chains. Shinnosuke found it odd that Voice appeared as someone other than Shu Amagi to him, Kiriko and Go when his illusion should only work on women, hence he deduced that Voice had copied a second human form. Shinnosuke proceeded to ask Rinna, but she had escaped. At the Roidmude's base, while healing Heart, Medic revealed that instead of erasing/resetting Proto-Zero's memory like Brain, she altered his main programming code to defend Roidmudes rather than humans, given that Proto-Zero's memory code is difficult to erase. The only downside was that Chase could no longer perform his original duty of eliminating unruly Roidmudes whilst preserving their cores. Brain, who silently eavesdropped on them, becomes jealous of Medic for performing a better job than him, and gets awkwardly nervous. In the Drive Pit, with Rinna still on the run, Mr. Belt is worried about the development of Shift Deadheat. He also can't contact Prof. Harley in America either. Shinnosuke let Go, the Signal Bikes, and Shift Cars to find Rinna while the rest of the unit focused to search the mysterious man which Voice impersonated. While Rinna meets Voice at a landfill area, Mach ambushes Voice until Chase interferes, allowing the two to escape. Both Mach Arabull and Chaser Bat clashed their Rider Kicks, ending their battle with a tie. At the same time, an old man riding a sidecar motorcycle enters the Drive Pit. After gathering information from the public, the mystery man was revealed to be Kisaburo Sasamoto, a physicist and former college mate of Rinna, as well as her boyfriend back in America. However, his whereabouts were unknown after he graduated. Genpachiro stated that it was possible that Rinna was not under Voice's control, but acted on her own accord. Sasamoto was researching on controlling organisms with soundwaves, which Voice made use of in his dating scam incidents. Trying to find his relationship with the Roidmude, Shinnosuke took out Go's photo and finally figured it out. At the same time, his Shift Brace received a message from Rinna. Bringing Rinna to a secret laboratory, Voice reunites her with the real Sasamoto. In the past, Sasamoto was forced to end his relationship with Rinna over his research, which deeply affected her. Not letting Voice misuse Sasamoto's research anymore, Rinna took out Shift Rolling Gravity and trapped Voice in a small gravitational field for Sasamoto to escape but instead, he betrays her, knocking the Shift Car off her hand. It wasn't until Shinnosuke, Kiriko and the Shift Cars arrive and turn the tables that Rinna was freed from Sasamoto's clutches. Based on Go's picture, which Sasamoto and Amagi both appear in, he concluded that Sasamoto was guilty of aiding and abetting a Roidmude. Voice revealed that prior to his arrival, Amagi was originally funding Sasamoto's research, thinking that it would be useful for the matchmaking business. Later, Amagi was disposed of by Voice who then copied his identity. Sasamoto then asked to join Voice in his plans, hence Voice copied him as well. As Shinnosuke, Kiriko, Rinna and Sasamoto escape from the lab from Voice, two other Roidmudes ambushed them until Tridoron and Go appeared as they transform to battle them and Voice. As Drive was about to deliver a blow to Voice, female victims under Voice's control came in and held them off. Voice was about to take advantage of this to eliminate the Riders and all the female victims when the previous old man riding a sidecar motorcycle appeared, revealing himself as Harley Hendrickson and handed over to Mach the completed Shift Deadheat. As Deadheat Mach, he quickly overpowers all three Roidmudes and finished the two combatmen. Just as Drive Type Wild Wrecker tied all of the female slaves, Voice revealed their hidden bombs until Mach destroys him, freeing the female victims from Voice's control. But their victory was cut short when Mach's Rider System entered its berserker state, nearly attacking Drive Type Technic who was disarming the bombs until Kiriko stopped him with a kick. While Genpachiro arrests Kisaburo, he finally realizes that Rinna is important to him. However it was too late, as Rinna chooses not to forgive him, with Chase watching from afar. After cheering up a heartbroken Rinna, Harley gave a present for Rinna and Krim to share before departing in his sidecar motorcycle.
| 18 | "Why Is Lieutenant Otta Following That Guy?"; Transliteration: "Naze Otta Keibuho wa Soitsu o Otta no ka" (Japanese: なぜ追田警部補はそいつを追ったのか) | Hidenori Ishida | Keiichi Hasegawa | February 15, 2015 |
When a trio of scammers had been deliberated by a Roidmude under the name of justice, police forces come to investigate the matter, as the case is similar to what happened to Heaven's Finance, a loan shark company. The Special Investigation Unit detected Heavy Acceleration particles, confirming the Roidmude's involvement in that case. With Kyu and Captain Honganji absent (Honganji supposedly returned to duty two weeks earlier after his vacation is over), Go appeared and showed them a website, Judge Time, giving services to eliminate criminals. Hearing the word "Judge", Genpachiro turned serious and decided to take the case on his own. Visiting Shingo Tachibana, a retired police officer and his old mentor, Genpachiro delivered him the bad news of "Judge", a criminal from 5 years ago rising again, meaning that he is still alive. Shingo is unable to cooperate with Genpachiro again after retirement but wished him luck in the case. After exposing Shinnosuke for tailing him, he revealed his past as well as Tachibana's background as a policeman. There was one case involving someone running a website that offered his clients to eliminate those whom they found guilty, using a taser as a main weapon. They finally tracked a man, who was suspected as the culprit but just as they began to get an upper hand in the case, the suspect fell from the bridge, seemingly committing suicide thus matching Judge's note saying that he would do the same if he was hunted by police forces. Tachibana still believes that the true Judge is still on the loose and tried to find him but only to retire two years later. Genpachiro swore to catch him and retire if he fails. Using that website, they deduced that his new target would be another land shark, Tenkawa Angel Real Estate and Black Candle, a street gang that picked their victims on road, and Go had already arrived at their meeting spot. Spotting another victim being bullied by them, he waited for Judge but was forced to save the victim out of heroism. At Tenkawa Angel Real Estate, Judge slowed them with a Heavy Acceleration wave and assaulted them until Genpachiro and Shinnosuke (both who were unaffected by the wave) race to the scene. However, Genpachiro was easily incapacitated, leaving Shinnosuke/Drive to handle him but also overpowered by his Kendo prowess until he vanished. After saving the victim from Black Candle members, he revealed that he was trying to film Judge's fight but seeing Go had made him interested with the latter instead and desire him to star in his film. Kiriko appeared and the two siblings had a short argument before leaving with the man. Kiriko sent Colorful Commercial to look after him. At the unit's office, the still-electrified Genpachiro requested a brand new version of his Anti-Heavy Acceleration backpack with voltage resistance which Rinna happily rushed to build. While Go is busy filming a scene, Genpachiro brought Shinnosuke to a bridge, where Judge's "death" took place. Both him and Tachibana realized that Judge used a man named Toma Okajima to cover up his death. Toma himself had evidence that he was not Judge, having pulled a button from Judge's jacket. Genpachiro and Tachibana tried to search for it but the results were fruitless. Visiting Akie, the victim's sister, she revealed that Tachibana always went to the same spot each date in every month of Toma's death. Genpachiro swears to assure Toma's innocence just as he finishes the case. Brain realized that Judge (the Roidmude's name) had been acting like Chase back on his days as Protodrive. He demanded Judge to be reset but all of his companions disagree, thinking that he has another ulterior motive. Exhausted after a whole night building the device, Rinna presented Genpachiro the Blinky Mark 3 and an insulator vest as she sleeps. Now, Judge targets Black Candle as they prepare for their battle. Go arrived at the scene and a Heavy Acceleration wave was released, as Judge electrified all of Black Candle members save for their leader. Go as Mach tried his best to stop him but was overpowered by his combination of Kendo skills and electric-based powers. Before the gang leader is about to be eliminated, Special Investigation Unit members rushed with Genpachiro striking him first but fainting after his Kendo technique triggered a shock within his memory. Drive and Mach once again faced him but as Drive Type Deadheat gained the upper hand, Mashin Chaser rushed in and saved Judge. As Judge dragged himself away, Genpachiro unmasked him as Tachibana much to everyone's disbelief, as he turned to his human form and reverted to escape. Mashin Chaser triggered the Ride Crosser combination on his own and resorted to eliminate the Riders. Filled with rage for having his bike stolen, an untransformed Go rushes to him, putting aside his own life.
| 19 | "What Can Judge a Detective?"; Transliteration: "Nani ga Keiji o Sabaku no ka" (Japanese: なにが刑事を裁くのか) | Hidenori Ishida | Keiichi Hasegawa | February 22, 2015 |
As Chaser uses the Ride Crosser to his advantage, Tridoron arrives, allowing Drive to use it to forcibly separate the Ride Crosser. Genpachiro goes to Tachibana's house to question his reasons for committing acts of revenge. Tachibana said that it was to lure out the true Judge, who was afraid that his fake suicide would be found out after 5 years. Genpachiro disapproves of his former mentor's actions, while Shinnosuke thinks there is more to it than just revenge. Tachibana then reveals to him that Akie lost her parents at a very young age. Her brother, who was her only living family, was killed and framed. It seemed that she had found her true happiness when she found her ideal partner, but when he found out about her past, he called off the wedding which was to take place two days later. Tachibana was filled with contempt, not only due to his inability to solve the case on his own, but also due to the one that had caused everything. The Judge Roidmude synchronized with his feelings and evolved into its current form. Meanwhile, Go finds himself being mistaken to be the real Judge. The Judge Roidmude also falls for this lie as well, and attacks Go, who transforms into Mach. However, Mach ends up getting overpowered by Judge. Mach recalls this event to Shinnosuke and Mr. Belt back at the Drive Pit. Kiriko explains this mistake by showing a news report, which depicts the clip that Go had filmed with the victim of the Black Candle gang, dubbed with a different voice that claims to be the real Judge. Go realizes he has been used as a red herring to his anger. He told Shinnosuke that the one who filmed him was a guy named Utsugi. The bad thing is, they had not any leads to track him, as the meeting between Go and Utsugi was by chance. However, Kiriko picks up Colorful Commercial, which she had sent after Go earlier on, and they manage to get a picture of Utsugi. At the Special Investigation Unit, Shinnosuke, Kiriko and Genpachiro were discussing how to track down Utsugi when Kyu suddenly appeared out of nowhere, speculating that "Utsugi" may be an alias, as that name was not found inside his database. Honganji also returns from his vacation, believing that Go would not commit such acts of revenge. He tells Shinnosuke that while his family were about to leave for Hawaii at the airport, he realized that he had lost his passport, infuriating his daughter. They had no choice but to travel around the whole of Japan. As Honganji wishes he could find his passport, Shinnosuke was reminded of the button that Toma Okajima pulled from Judge before his death, and rushes to look for it. Kiriko and Genpachiro follow as well to comb for evidence. Kyu searches in his database to find that Utsugi has opened a new website, named "True Judge Time". Mr. Belt tells this to Shinnosuke as well, adding that Utsugi is going to commit an act of "righteous vengeance" at 4pm. The Shift Cars arrive to assist Shinnosuke in finding the button. Just then, Akie calls out to Shinnosuke, revealing that she quit her job and will be moving away soon. Shinnosuke begs her to stay for a little while longer, as he and his friends are on the trail of the real Judge, and requests her to have faith in the police. While Genpachiro is searching for evidence, he finds Deco Traveler at the middle of the road. He notes that it resembles a dekotora. He is able to relate to Traveler as both of them can be considered relics. Traveler cheers him up as it drives away. It then arrives at where Shinnosuke is, feeling hot-blooded after witnessing an officer's pride. Gen goes back to the Unit's base, as Kyu finds out there are over a hundred requests for revenge on Judge's new website. With only one hour left till 4pm, it will be hard to narrow down which request he will fulfill. Honganji checks his book on fortune, to find that his passport was in there all along. An idea hits Gen, who drags Kiriko along with him. Utsugi has decided he will fulfill his 72nd request, whose target is a woman. As said woman returns to her home, Utsugi as Judge appears before her, only for his plan to be foiled as the woman was actually Kiriko in disguise. Gen arrives and handcuffs Utsugi, revealing that he found a pattern in the victims he had attacked in the past, thus narrowing down the list of targets to two. The rest was all a gamble based on his intuition. He then asks Utsugi why he killed Toma, with him replying that he has no proof. Just then, Shinnosuke arrives with the missing button, containing Toma's and Utsugi's fingerprints. He was able to find it thanks to Deco Traveler. Tachibana arrives, with Judge Roidmude appearing behind him, planning to dispose of both Utsugi and Tachibana and take over as "Judge" the avenger. Shinnosuke transforms into Drive and battles the Roidmude. However, Chase joins the fray, but is then interrupted by Go, who transforms into Mach. While Chase gets the upper hand at first, Mach overpowers him with Deadheat Mach. Chase attempts to activate the Ride Crosser combination but to no avail, as Mach did not bring his Ride Macher along with him. Drive also defeats Judge Roidmude with Type Wild Dump. Gen demanded Utsugi again why he chose Toma as his decoy. Utsugi revealed that he was helped by Toma once, which angered him, as he felt that Toma was acting like a big hero, when Utsugi himself was the avenger. Gen prepares to punch Utsugi, but is stopped by Go who thinks that he is not worth being punched. As Utsugi is being led away, Tachibana offers himself to be arrested. However, Shinnosuke explains that Tachibana's only crime of giving in to his torment has already been dealt with, and advises him to tell Akie that her brother has been proven innocent. Tachibana commends Gen for having such a good team to work with.
| 20 | "When Did Kyu Saijo Become a Roidmude?"; Transliteration: "Saijō Kyū wa Itsu kara Roimyūdo Datta no ka" (Japanese: 西城究はいつからロイミュードだったのか) | Osamu Kaneda | Riku Sanjo | March 1, 2015 |
Shinnosuke, Kiriko, and Go are on their way to Kyu's autograph session when a Heavy Acceleration wave was released and a giant television screen on a building exploded. Go quickly transformed into Mach and rushed to the scene. As Roidmude 072 was about to drop a female victim from a height, Mach and Drive appear, causing him to feel amazed as he had finally seen the two Kamen Riders. Drive notes that he sounds familiar. However, he ran away after two half-evolved cockroach-like Roidmudes attacked him and overpowered the Riders. Mr. Belt gets Kiriko and the Shift Cars to track 072, only to end up at Kyu's apartment. Shinnosuke and Go arrive there as well, and the three hear what seems to be Kyu arguing with himself. They barge inside to find two Kyu Saijos inside, and arrests them both. Meanwhile, Medic introduces Heart to her Reaper Legion Roidmudes that were tasked to carry out Chase's former duty as a Grim Reaper as Brain gets jealous of her overwhelming success. At the Special Investigation Unit office, both Kyus were distinguished by wearing different colored shirts, one known as Black-Saijo, and the other, White-Saijo. Black-Saijo tries to lie that both of them are twin brothers, but none of the other unit members fall for it. They end up being interrogated at separate rooms. White-Saijo tells Kiriko and Shinnosuke that he met Roidmude 072 on New Years' Eve. As he was unable to kill Kyu, the two stayed together, with 072 taking over Kyu's place in the Unit at times, trying to gather information about the Kamen Rider. As both Kyus exit the Kuruma Driving Office, Gen threatens to force a confession out of them with a fake rifle but fails. Shinnosuke arrives and brings out a limited edition of a commemorative plate (a replica made by Shift Cars Colorful Commercial and Spin Mixer) of the anime Murmur Mansion. He throws it into the air, and both Kyus rush towards it. White-Saijo catches the plate, exposing his true identity as Roidmude 072, as the real Kyu is less athletic. Shinnosuke figures that Kyu was not coerced into living with 072, he chose to live with 072 on his own accord. The real Kyu reveals that before 072 was about to kill him, Kyu requested that 072 let him watch the final episode of his favourite anime before his death. Both Kyu and 072 watched the anime, and were touched by it. Ever since then, Kyu and 072 lived together. At the day of Kyu's autograph session, 072 went to the press conference for the movie edition of Kyu's favourite anime, Murmur Mansion. However, once he hears that the movie will be dubbed over by voice actors and actresses, one of them being the victim from earlier in the episode, he went berserk and released the Heavy Acceleration wave, and went on to punish the voice actress, as the anime is better with subtitles and using voice actors would ruin the anime. Shinnosuke sees 072 as a good guy, affirming his belief that Roidmudes and humans can coexist in harmony. Kiriko is reminded of Chase after hearing this. As 072 tells his wish of continuing to stay with Kyu, he is killed by Medic. As he dies, 072 instructs Shinnosuke to lie to Kyu that 072 went berserk and was defeated by the Kamen Rider, in order not to affect Kyu emotionally too much. While Go as Mach attacks the Reaper Legion, Medic claims herself and the others as the new Reapers and says that no matter how many times they reset rogue Roidmudes, those Roidmudes would get out of the line again. To solve this, she and her Reapers secretly eliminate their Cores. Drive objects to her explanation and labels her a demon compared to Chase, the former Reaper, who gave rogue Roidmudes a chance to live again by retaining their Cores, and assumes Type Deadheat to attack her. After assuming Type Deadheat Flare, he initiates a Deadheat Drop while Medic uses her Reapers to cover her escape. Drive screams loudly in anger after the battle. Kyu was deeply affected by his loss after Shinnosuke told him the lie but still, Honganji comforted him. Shinnosuke quickly ran away while Kiriko was forced to help Honganji filling in his reports. Standing at a ship, Medic is disgusted at Drive for being able to lay an injury on her. She transforms into her Advanced form.
| 21 | "What Do the Unusual Dead Speak About?"; Transliteration: "Fuzoroi no Shisha-tachi wa Nani o Kataru no ka" (Japanese: 不揃いの死者たちはなにを語るのか) | Osamu Kaneda | Riku Sanjo | March 8, 2015 |
Five cases of murders are reported at the same time at different parts of the city, but each victim is killed in a different way. While Kyu leaves for home to search some clues regarding the case, Genpachiro remembers that a security camera captured a picture of the suspect and his bike which surprisingly reveals to be Chase. At the Drive Pit, Go decides to hunt him down on his own while Shinnosuke and Mr. Belt agree that Chase has to be killed. Shinnosuke decides to stick to Kiriko's ideals, but promises to kill him if Chase is truly the cause of the murders. At a ship, Medic lies about Roidmude 072 and her Reapers' demise at the hands of Drive and decides to take matters seriously. After Chase fully heals, he receives a report that he is followed. After incapacitating Gen and his policeman accomplice, he traps them in a Heavy Acceleration wave. Shinnosuke and Kiriko rush to the scene as Mach appears and fights Mashin Chaser. Shinnosuke as well transforms into Drive, bringing Genpachiro and his accomplice to safety via Dimension Cab and fights Chaser. After Chaser traps Deadheat Mach in a Super Heavy Acceleration, he easily overpowers him until Drive Type Technic stops him and tries to reason with his actions for killing humans. Chaser however reveals that he only defends his own kind and thinks of nothing else, fearing Kiriko and Mr. Belt. Medic orders Chaser to retreat and let her Reapers fight the Riders. She uses her Roidmude form combined with her ballet performances for her attacks. With her Reapers having joined the brawl, she modifies Roidmude 104's right hand into an arm cannon, which explains the creation of Reaper Legion Roidmudes while Brain watches from afar, now knowing her to be the reason behind Chase's increasing power. She orders her minions to retreat while leaving 104 to handle the rest. 104 uses his newfound weapon in an aerial fight until he is destroyed by Mach's Beat Macher Full Throttle. At the Unit's office, Genpachiro has revealed the Riders' true appearances and deduces the green and black ones as two other unnamed Riders until he is corrected. Remembering previous cases, Shinnosuke reviews the victims as templates for previous Roidmudes used as human disguises, having spotted one from the picture as Roidmude 037's human form, meaning that the original ones were disposed so that Roidmudes could take their places. Kyu quickly arrived and revealed that Roidmudes can travel through computers using their Cores and 072 from prior went into Kyu's blog. Kyu used his method to track Roidmudes via computer network. Mr. Belt sends the Shift Cars to gather the relation without knowing that all of them have been captured by Medic. Brain meets Chase in his room and gives him "something" to help Chase in his later confrontation against Drive. While Shinnosuke and Kiriko are patrolling in Tridoron, they pick up Justice Hunter's SOS sign. Mach tails Chase on his bike, but is quickly interrupted by Medic, who has Heart take care for Mach. They arrive at Hunter's spot but the Shift Car attacks Shinnosuke and leads him to Chase, where all 18 known Tire Exchange Shift Cars had been placed under Medic's control. It was revealed that all those murders were nothing but baits as she staged Drive's defeat by stripping him of his subordinates, while Mach is confronted by Heart. Before the slow-motioned Kiriko and Shinnosuke are about to be killed, Shift Wild and Technic quickly docked themselves into their Shift Car Holders to save their lives. Shinnosuke as Drive Type Wild tries to fight, but is overpowered by the improved Mashin Chaser as well as the enslaved Shift Cars. In the end, Mashin Chaser traps him in a Super Heavy Acceleration, slowing Drive's movements greatly and having the advantage. Mach decides to risk his own safety by delivering Shift Deadheat to Drive but even as Type Deadheat, the Super Heavy Acceleration reduces his high combat capabilities. Drive tries to remind Chaser of his old life as Protodrive which succeeds, but he regains his sense and assumes Triple Tune. Mr. Belt is forced to reveal another secret: he had stored a Type Change Shift Car, but was forced to hide its existence due to the danger it carried. Nonetheless, Drive allows for the Shift Car's arrival, having no longer begrudging Mr. Belt for keeping secrets. The Triple Tune Mashin Chaser deliberates Drive with his attack by using the enslaved Shift Cars to ram into him. However, a strange new Shift Car enters the blaze and gives Drive a new form: Type Formula.
| 22 | "How Do I Fight With the F1 Body?"; Transliteration: "Efu Wan Bodi de Dō Yatte Tatakaeba Ii no ka" (Japanese: F1ボディでどうやって戦えばいいのか) | Osamu Kaneda | Riku Sanjo | March 15, 2015 |
Shinnosuke arrives at the Special Investigation Unit with an injured neck, as he confirms his theory that the five homicides are linked to the Roidmudes. However, that still leaves the question of why all five cases occurred at the same time. At the Drive Pit, Rinna is removing Medic's control on the Shift Cars, which are currently out of commission. Mr. Belt recalls Drive's first fight as Type Formula, whose power saved Kiriko and the Shift Cars from destruction. However, its Full Throttle finisher placed a strain on Shinnosuke's neck. Shinnosuke also thanked Go for passing Shift Deadheat to him in the nick of time. Go, still not feeling at ease about Chase, leaves. Mr. Belt figures that they need to find a way to finish off the battle as Type Formula without any self-inflicting injury. Rinna states that she has made a new weapon that can handle the issue, but she is still stuck on the finishing touches. She is then reminded of the gift she received from Prof. Harley, believing that he left a hint inside. The gift turns out to be the Professor's home-made Harley Pies. At a medical inspector's office in eastern Kanto, dead bodies begin crawling out of their beds. Back at the Unit, five men appear in the office. Honganji thinks that they want to get a driver's licence, but Kyu recognises them as the victims from the five homicides. Go and Kiriko try to fend off the victims, but Kiriko gets knocked out and carried away by two of them. As a victim attacks Honganji, he throws all sorts of things at the victim, including Shift Wild, allowing Mr. Belt to sense the danger. The Shift Car penetrates the victim's body, causing it to burn and disintegrate into dust. Go chases another victim and throws his Signal Bike at him, doing the same thing to its body as well. Shinnosuke arrives at the Unit's office and inspects the scene. Mr Belt deduces that the bodies were copies created by Medic, which was how forensics believed that they died at the same time. Rinna is still fretting over her creation at the Drive Pit. Beneath a highway, one of the "victims" passes Kiriko to Chase, who then disintegrates all the remaining three victims. He is stopped by Go, who transforms into Mach. As Mach asks Chase how could he toy with human life, it undoes part of Chase's reprogramming back to its original state, causing Chase to put down Kiriko on the ground and step back in shock. As a confused Chase wonders what he has done, Medic appears and renders him unconscious. She sends her Reapers after Mach, who fights them as Deadheat Mach. After the fight, he collapses in exhaustion. He wakes up to find Shinnosuke and Kiriko, and tells Shinnosuke that Chase wants to fight him fair and square. Brain finds himself cornered by Chase at the Roidmudes' base. Medic exposes Brain's action of weakening Chase's firewall, as she reveals that she has increased Chase's destructive impulses to their highest level, allowing him to kill anyone that she tells him to. Brain begs Medic to forgive him, while Medic sends Chase after Drive. Medic reveals that she only let Brain live only out of consideration for Heart. Brain searches for his handkerchief, only to find that it has been taken by Medic, who throws it into the fireplace, causing him to suffer a nervous breakdown. Chase is on a killing spree, demanding to find Drive. Shinnosuke transforms into Drive and fights him, but is overpowered by Chase's Super Heavy Acceleration. Even with Type Deadheat, Drive cannot match up to Chase's high speed. As Chase is about finish Drive off with Triple Tune, Rinna's new weapon appears and disrupts his attack, delivering Shift Formula to Drive. Drive dubs the new weapon the "Trailer-Hou". With the Trailer-Hou, Drive easily overpowers Chase and defeats him, resulting in his core being destroyed. The Ride Chaser is left at the Drive Pit's possession. As Rinna, Kyu, and Honganji clean up the mess at the Unit's office, Kyu chides Shinnosuke for playing around with his new "toys". Honganji stops Kyu from picking on the Shift Cars, dubbing them the Unit's guardian spirits. Meanwhile, on a rainy night, Kiriko finds Chase in a corner struggling with his injuries, much to her shock.
| 23 | "Who Can Stop the Mischievous Smile?"; Transliteration: "Itazura na Emi o Tomeru no wa Dare ka" (Japanese: 悪戯な笑みを止めるのはだれか) | Nobuhiro Suzumura | Junko Komura | March 22, 2015 |
Heart was given the bad news that Chase is now "destroyed", while holding the former's Shift Speed Prototype Car in a memorial. Brain fakes his crying, stating that the tragedy wouldn't happen if his reprogramming was made in a proper way. Medic tells Heart that he was not a part of the "Promised Number", so his loss would be nothing, but Heart keeps mourning his death, so much that Brain take this opportunity to get close to Heart. Unknown to them too, Chase survived but is secretly resting at an abandoned building while Kiriko and Shift Car Mad Doctor secretly heal him. At the Tsukushiyama shopping mall in April 2, SWAT units had safely evacuated the building with the courtyard's monument exploding, based on a bombing notice. This was the third case of serial bombings which led to the Special Investigation Unit's interference in the next day. Oddly enough, all bombing spots were marked clean by SWAT forces before the explosion happened. For now, only Kyu, Shinnosuke and Genpachiro were the available members with Honganji on business, Rinna doing research and Kiriko just arriving after she "overslept". Suddenly, a new bombing notice was sent, which stated a bomb would explode at the Kuruma Leisure Amusement Park. After the evacuation of the amusement park, Drive and Mach searched for the bombs until Drive spotted a suspicious man recording the Ferris Wheel with his smartphone. The man ran away after being caught by Shinnosuke. As the time strikes, Mach mysteriously blew up and fell from the Ferris Wheel. It turned out to be Shoot Roidmude, wondering why the Ferris Wheel didn't explode. As Drive battled Shoot, he mysteriously attacked for unknown reasons. Shoot escaped, while leaving a purple dart which falls from Mach's Tomarle shield. At the Drive Pit, Mr. Belt noticed that Mad Doctor disappeared. As Go leaves, Shinnosuke wondered why the Ferris Wheel didn't explode along with Go. Reminded of Scooper Roidmude's photographic manipulation technique, he suddenly thinks of the suspect earlier. Takuro Mogi, the suspect, was interrogated for the bombings as he appeared past bombing places like Midorigaya East High School (his school), the train station and the Tsukushiyama shopping mall. He said that he wanted to witness the bombings while claiming that recording the Ferris Wheel was a mere coincidence. A reported from Metropolitan Police Department reached Genpachiro, revealing that four separate places (Industrial Building 6, City Cultural Hall, Midorigaya Park and Tsukushiyama Aquarium will be bombed at 3 PM. Takuro wanted to watch the bombings but preferred to stay to prove his innocence. As he commented if he would capture the scenes with light speed, Shinnosuke thought of something and entered Top Gear again. He called Go, whom was in the middle of training. Shoot Roidmude stands on the top of a building and was about to make some explosions before Shinnosuke and Go appeared. Shinnosuke revealed that his ability was to fire missiles and darts at a great speed so much that it cannot be detected by the naked eye. Deadheat Mach fought Shoot while Drive Type Formula stopped the warheads. Just as he chased the fourth warhead, his body suddenly fell from mechanical shock, with the Pit Crew Shift Cars fixing him and Drive assumes Type Formula Mantarn to boost his speed and stopped the final warhead. Followed by his berserk state, Deadheat Mach was defeated by Shoot, causing his belt to be damaged which cancels his transformation. Drive made it just in time, using Jacky and Sparner to outmatch Shoot before destroying him with Trailer Impact. Takuro was finally released after no evidence found on his relation with the Roidmude. While Kiriko made her visit to Chase, he awakened and pull her, asking if she was the one who rescued him.
| SP | "Shuriken Sentai Ninninger vs. Kamen Rider Drive: Spring Break Combined 1 Hour Special"; Transliteration: "Shuriken Sentai Ninninjā Tai Kamen Raidā Doraibu Haruyasumi Gattai Ichijikan Supesharu" (Japanese: 手裏剣戦隊ニンニンジャーVS仮面ライダードライブ 春休み合体1時間スペシャル) | Shojiro Nakazawa | Riku Sanjo | March 29, 2015 |
When the Roidmudes and the Kibaoni Army Corps join forces in a shady scheme, Drive and Mach must team up with the Ninningers to stop them.
| 24 | "What Is Making Mach Run?"; Transliteration: "Nani ga Mahha o Hashiraseru no ka" (Japanese: なにがマッハを走らせるのか) | Nobuhiro Suzumura | Junko Kōmura | April 5, 2015 |
Brain had just finished making adjustments to Shoot Roidmude's body, and ensured that the Roidmude would help him win Heart. Kiriko was asked by Chase if she was the one whom saved him, as she confirms. Chase felt guilt of her kindness, even after he had nearly killed her multiple times. Exactly two days after his interrogation from the police officers, Takuro walked out from his school and met Shinnosuke again, as he noticed Takuro's change of behaviour compared to the last time they met. The boy becomes more serious and ordered Shinnosuke to get away from him. Rinna had just finished repairing the Mach Driver Honoh, but Go desperately wanted a new upgrade after his previous defeat from Shoot. While on the sidewalk, Takuro received a message, stating that a bus stop near him would exploded at 1.13 pm and it exploded a minute later. Takuro ran away from the scene, only to bump into Shoot Roidmude. Shoot declared that his role in sending bomb threats is over, and now he's targeting him. Takuro tried to run away from him but he received a new message that the bicycle parking lot he stand in would explode in 1.44 pm. Fortunately, Shinnosuke saved him from the explosion. Mach arrived and battled Shoot but quickly incapacitated by his neurotoxins until Kiriko saved him with Mad Doctor. At the Unit's office, Takuro revealed that it originally started as a prank. After going through his mundane life for days, he came across a bombing case. Shoot appeared to him while he's alone, and struck a deal for Takuro to send bomb threats and him bombed said locations. However, after his first destruction, he instead had decided to eliminate Takuro. Mr. Belt and Kiriko discovered that ever since Mashin Chaser upgraded himself, Drive would do the same to counter him but in the end, that makes Go leaving behind despite Mach's system supposedly made even more advanced than Drive System. While Honganji had cuffed himself to Takuro, Kyu just received a new bombing threat on Takuro's phone that stated to eliminate him. Shinnosuke went out, followed by Otta (whom stated to "evacuate nearby citizens") and Kyu (since he's "not" a police officer), leaving Honganji trapped with Takuro. Kiriko comforted Go and reminded him that he is always confident ever since their childhood, as well as him becoming what remained for her after they were orphaned. With one minute left, Drive and Mach transform where Mach incapacitate his missiles at first before attacking Shoot. However, once fallen into his toxin's effect, Mach forced himself into the berserker state, saving him at the same time mastering the Dead Zone's side effects. Drive Type Formula joined the battle and they destroy Shoot with Trailer Impact and Heat Kick Macher. Takuro was freed once again, with Honganji giving him several words of encouragement before he left. Go decided to call off his upgrade, having already strong on himself. Meanwhile, Chase left his hideout and decided to walk on his own while bringing along some of Kiriko's flowers.
| 25 | "Why Has a New Battle Begun?"; Transliteration: "Aratanaru Tatakai wa Naze Hajimatta no ka" (Japanese: 新たなる闘いはなぜ始まったのか) | Satoshi Morota | Riku Sanjo | April 12, 2015 |
While the Special Investigation Unit play poker, Mitsuhide Nira, the leader of the 1st Division pays a visit, poorly criticize them and the Unit as a needless division and threatens to shut it down if he didn't get a recent report on them. Shinnosuke spaces out at a park, looking at his old photo with his late father and wished to tell him about all of the cases he solved as a Kamen Rider. He even wanted Drive to fully become a part of the police forces but Mr. Belt (through Shift Speed) denies it, fearing that Roidmudes will infiltrate the police forces and eliminate Drive from within. Shinnosuke received a phone call that a wave of Heavy Acceleration just detected. At said location, Roidmude 007 had just break free Hajime Taga, a prisoner and offered him an absolute power by combining with him. Accepting 007's offer, he becomes the Sword Roidmude and tried to attack the decelerated police forces before Kamen Riders Drive and Mach stopped him. Sword flees from them, having known whom he will after next. While the police forces approached Drive in astonishment, Kiriko spotted Chase and sent Justice Hunter after him. Heart and Medic discuss the news of 007 fusing with a human to evolve. Knowing Brain won't be too smart to create the new Viral Core, Heart suddenly knows who is the true mastermind. Now knowing a new type of evolution 007 has gone through, the Drive Pit crews discuss this matters and debating on how to eliminate 007 without killing the human. As Go decided to track Sword on his own, Rinna offered herself to modify the Drive Driver to set it to killing Roidmudes, though still needed a sample of an Advanced Roidmude. Shinnosuke suddenly realised that he's late for meeting with Kiriko decided to go off while getting the sample of an Advanced Roidmude. During the meeting at the Unit's office, 1st Division officers expressed their apology to Genpachiro for not believing the existence of Kamen Rider and Roidmudes, revealing that they were the ones whom laughed him in one episode. Nira stopped them and tried to claim back his men while urging the unit to apprehend Hajime. While patrolling with Gen via Tridoron, Shinnosuke quietly excited that the whole division had at least tried to give the Kamen Riders their support, despite being unable to transform into Drive when nearby. Shinnosuke suddenly stopped the car remembering Hajime clearly. Sometime before the Global Freeze, Hajime had just killed a police officer. He was quickly arrested by Shinnosuke's former partner, Akira Hayase. This makes Hayase as his current target. As Shinnosuke phoned and warned Hayase at his hospital, the latter agreed but urged Shinnosuke to come faster as he doesn't want more patients to become victims. Kiriko approached to Chase and asked him for his help. Chase confused, since he is a Roidmude, followed by multiple of his assassination attempt on her and Drive but she still trust him, even Kyu Saijo revealed himself, having sent by Shinnosuke to spy on Kiriko and told that he even believed that Roidmudes were not so evil since he encountered one. Chase transformed into Mashin Chaser and rips off one of his Violet Guard to Kiriko as a sign of cooperation before leaving. Kiriko phoned Rinna later on much to Saijo's shock. Sword started to attack the hospital and nearly killed Hayase until Tridoron appeared and for Shinnosuke and Gen saved him. Kamen Rider Mach appeared and fights him but still unable to fully kill Sword due to being partially human. As Rinna arrived with the Drive Driver, Shinnosuke forced to transform into Drive in front of multiple onlookers, including Gen and Kyu. Drive fights Sword in Type Speed, followed by Type Formula Sparner before reverting and separated 007 from Hajime with SpeeDrop. As 007 tried to get away, Drive jump into the ejected Tridoron cabin and eliminated him with Drift Slash. Luckily, his Core was saved by Roidmude 001. Shinnosuke quickly arrested Hajime for escaping custody and attempted murder. Mach approached Gen and Kyu, revealing him as Go much to their shock. News of Hajime's apprehension reached Nira, even surprising him with the fact that Shinnosuke is Kamen Rider Drive. Shinnosuke showed Gen and Kyu the Drive Pit. Honganji appeared, having known Krim as his former colleague and that the Special Investigation Unit's formation was his plan all along to help Drive. Shinnosuke relieved over the fact that he will never stressed over his double life as Drive but Honganji even made Drive's secret identity to the public much to their shock.
| 26 | "Where Will Chaser Proceed?"; Transliteration: "Cheisā wa Doko e Mukau no ka" (Japanese: チェイサーはどこへ向かうのか) | Satoshi Morota | Riku Sanjo | April 19, 2015 |
Passing by the multitude of reporters attempting to talk to him, Shinnosuke meets Nira, who warns him to be careful in order to not end up sharing his father's fate, hinting that his death was not as officially reported. The Special Investigation Unit then holds a meeting where Honganji reveals that he had the Kamen Riders' existence leaked to the public in response to Roidmude 001's appearance, and because as he finds too odd that the Roidmudes are being mostly ignored by the authorities after all the chaos they caused during the Global Freeze, implying that they are somehow infiltrated within the police, and Shinnosuke wonders if it could be connected with his father's death as well. In the occasion, Kiriko also reveals that Chase is still alive thanks to her aid and Go gets himself upset about it, as he still refuses to trust him. Elsewhere, Chase is approached by Kiriko and Shinnosuke, who thank him for his assistance and Mr. Belt asks him to rejoin their side, when Heart, guided by the signal emitted by Proto Drive's Shift Car appears to attempt to persuade him as well. In the occasion, Heart hints Shinnosuke that 001 must be linked with his father's death, enraging him. Ignoring Kiriko's warn that 007 is still alive and looking for Taga, Shinnosuke transforms into Kamen Rider Drive Type Deadheat and attacks Heart furiously, demanding for answers, until Chase, transformed into Masshin Chaser intervenes, wounding him in the process. Perceiving that Chase is still indecisive, Heart returns him Proto Drive's Shift Car and retreats. Back to the Special Investigation Unit's headquarters, Nira mocks Shinnosuke for his failure and reveals that he had Taga moved to a secret location before 007 attacked, refusing to reveal it. After Nira leaves, Genpachiro decides to use his connections to discover where Taga's being held and both Mr. Belt and Jin assure Shinnosuke that they are investigating 001's involvement with his father's death and tell him to calm down, while Go is angry that Kiriko is still defending Chase after he wounded Shinnosuke, but Rinna then appears to deliver Kiriko a case with something she was working on for Chase by her request, and have Ride Chaser deliver it to him. Meanwhile, 007 discovers where Taga is being detained and appears to rescue him, but thanks to Gen's info, Shinnosuke, Go and Kiriko arrive just as Taga fuses with 007 into Sword Roidmude once more. With Kamen Rider Mach knocked down by the enemy and Shinnosuke unable to transform due to his wound, Kiriko attempts to fight him alone, but just as she is about to be killed, Chase arrives to rescue her. Using a spare Mach Drive and the Signal Chaser Bike sent by her, Chase transforms into Kamen Rider Chaser and fights the Sword Roidmude, separating Taga from 007 before finishing the Roidmude with his new weapon, the Shingo Ax's Full Throttle attack. As Taga is arrested by Shinnosuke, Chaser takes his leave, while Heart, watching from a distance, realizes that Chase had chosen his side and bids farewell to him. Nira then reports what happened to his superior, Secretary Soichi Makage from the National Defense Agency, and after leaving, Brain approaches the secretary, who is revealed to be no other than Roidmude 001 in disguise.
| 27 | "What Is Go Shijima's Reason to Fight?"; Transliteration: "Shijima Gō ga Tatakau Riyū wa Nani ka" (Japanese: 詩島剛が戦う理由はなにか) | Hidenori Ishida | Keiichi Hasegawa | April 26, 2015 |
While several citizens playing at the neighborhood, a strange Roidmude throws a Neo Spider Viral Core. At the Kuruma Driving License Centre, Rinna introduced the Ride Booster Set that would be useful for all three Kamen Riders. Go however finds it irritating to count Chase as their ally, shoves Kiriko, and gets slapped by her. As Go left them with Kiriko in guilt, Genpachiro called them that the First Division wanted the cooperation with Special Investigation Unit. Yoriko Soma tried to call for the Unit's help but find Go instead and call for his help that his little brother had been kidnapped by a Roidmude. During the meeting, it was reported that 37 citizens of Yumemigayama Village had been injured from serious attack and Mitsuhide Nira decided to hand over the case to Shinnosuke, being the son of the late officer Eisuke. They were even introduced to Noumi, whom obviously to Kiriko and Shinnosuke is none other than Brain in disguise. The Yoriko told Go of her brother's background as a real estate agent of a town while he secretly relate it to his relationship with Kiriko. Go decided to take the case on his own and promise to save the woman's little brother. At outside, Shinnosuke as Drive tried to force Brain Roidmude to reveal all of the secrets of 001. Though Brain only reveal several small details, however, he quickly take this as an opening to frame Drive. While Brain express his success to 001/Makage, an officer entered his office and demanded answer of a recent monster attack but 001 altered his memory to thought this as an accident. Shinnosuke was suspended from being Drive and the Tridoron has been towed away. While Shinnosuke decided to quit as an officer, Honganji hold him off, telling that his father would died in vain. Go and the woman realized that recent cases of household areas being attacked are related to his brother's disappearances. The Unit founded its real estate agent, Ryo Soma, and both Gen and Rinna pose themselves as new neighbors with Shift Colorful Commercial covers Shinnosuke's disappearances while Shinnosuke went undercover quietly. Shinnosuke even bumped into the similarly undercover Go and Yoriko, while noticing the woman's relation to Ryo and Kiriko visited Chase, having required his help and him as well wanted the Shift Speed Prototype to be fixed in hopes of recovering his lost memory. Suddenly, some of the residents turned wild, with Genpachiro as well being hold off by Shinnosuke and realised a logo on his hand, as well as those affected. The true culprit appeared, Seeker Roidmude, whose true motif is to amplify humanity's negative emotions to find the one worthy of fusing with him. After Seeker knocked the affected victims for deeming the unworthy, an angry Go transformed into Mach. While fighting Seeker, two other Roidmudes showed up and assist him in fighting Mach. As he about to be finished, the Ride Booster Set appeared and saved him. Mr. Belt ordered Shinnosuke to transform but hesitated after remembering Honganji's words. Chase appeared and allow himself to take over for Shinnosuke, transforming into Chaser and defeated the two Low Classes with Shingou Ax. However, Mach furiously attacked Chase, where Seeker revealed that it was all a part of the plan and leaves. As an untransformed Chase is about to be killed, Shinnosuke stepped in and stopped Mach. As Chase leaves and the injured citizens being carried by several paramedics, Go tearfully revealed that his motive for destroying Roidmudes is because they were his father's creation, and many people died in the Global Freeze because of his mistake. He desired to destroy them to atone for what his father had done.
| 28 | "Why Were the Families Targeted?"; Transliteration: "Naze Kazoku wa Nerawareta no ka" (Japanese: なぜ家族は狙われたのか) | Hidenori Ishida | Keiichi Hasegawa | May 3, 2015 |
Go can't still forgive the mistakes his father had made, even if it turns out to be an accident. His wish is to destroy all Roidmudes before Kiriko would found out. At the Drive Pit, while Shinnosuke and Mr. Belt discuss the matters, Kiriko enters and reveals the Shift Speed Prototype Car in repair. At the Special Investigation Unit's office, Shinnosuke deduced that the Roidmude's goal is to find a perfect candidate to fuse with and all rejected victims are currently in suspended animation. Strangely enough, Rinna was the only one remained unaffected. Mitsuhide Nira visits the office again, gleefully mocking over the team's ineffective ever since Shinnosuke was suspended before leaving. An idea hits Shinnosuke, where he and Kiriko visits Chase as they asks him for his help. While Chase agrees as a gift for saving him, he notes that Go's hatred for him earlier was unusual compared to before in addition with Seeker having anticipated/planned Go's ascending hatred so much that he wants to fight Chase. Kiriko tries to call Go but to no avail as he focuses in his client's help. Yoriko suddenly receives a call from Ryo, with his voice is shrouded but knows where the exact location he is as they rush there. The Unit now knows that Go is the main target of Seeker Roidmude, while Honganji speculates a greater force (presumably 001) is behind this threat. As 001 and Brain decide to launch the biggest move of all, Go and Yoriko arrives at an apartment area to search Ryo, where the whole residents descent into madness. Back at the Unit's office, Kyu reveals that Yoriko was never mentioned in one of Ryo's relatives. However, he finds the data about Ryo in his working area. Rinna enters and has upgraded the Heavy Acceleration detector to detect the smallest particle in a larger radius, even from the sky with same upgrades had been fitted to the Ride Booster Set. What's left was for Shinnosuke's liberation, where Proto-Zero rampages in the Unit's office when Nira makes another visit, forcing him to lift the ban on Shinnosuke's transformation as Drive. Proto-Zero and Drive goes out of the office, where Tridoron awaits as the Ride Booster Set fuses with Tridoron and Drive and Chaser aboard. Brain witness their departure, sending three Giant Bat Roidmudes to attack the Riders; Drive and Chaser eliminate them before resuming their journey. After eliminating the Neo Viral Cores and knocking out the victims, Mach finds Ryo and awakes him but is surprised when learns that Yoriko is not her sister. Yoriko appears and reveals that she only uses Go's family relationship to target the population by spreading the madness infection that would cause them to go berserk, spreading through touch with Go affected as well. While 050/"Yoriko"'s plan indeed is to search for ideal hosts for the Neo Viral Cores, the other plan they constructed is to draw his inner darkness. "Yoriko" as Seeker willingly had herself injured by Mach in order to escalate his anger until Chaser tried to stop him from his rage that would end up killing "Yoriko", but eventually gets himself retaliated by Mach until Drive comes in and knocks Mach. Enraged by Drive's interference, Seeker tries to attack him, but is overpowered by Type Formula and gets separated, splitting into "Yoriko" and 050. In the end, Drive Type Formula Mantarn finishes 050 with Trailer Impact. After the battle, Shinnosuke reveals that "Yoriko" is Reiko Nishihori, the daughter of Koya Nishihori, 005's host, whom Chase destroyed during his time as Protodrive with Shinnosuke at that same time arrested Koya for attempted robbery and murder. Reiko was never Ryo's sister, but she was one of his customers. Reiko's reason for committing such act is not to avenge her dad, but to make Go commit the greatest crime from her death is to make the Kamen Rider commit the most heinous crime by killing her. Go quickly compare his situation to Reiko in his mind, having their fathers turned them into what they become now. At the hospital, Seeker's suspended animation effect on Genpachiro has worn off, with Rinna visits him and grew flirtatious after their earlier act as husband-wife pair in one of their undercovers. Meeting the Roidmudes Heart and Medic, they amaze 001 for handing over his power to Roidmude 050 (the ability to induce madness in a population) with 001 decides to make use of Go Shijima/Kamen Rider Mach as their ultimate weapon. At night, while Go is wandering around with suffering hallucinations of Shinnosuke, Kiriko and Banno, Brain appears out of nowhere and approaches him.
| 29 | "What Really Happened During the Robbery?"; Transliteration: "Gōtō Jiken de Hontō wa Nani ga Atta no ka" (Japanese: 強盜事件で本当はなにがあったのか) | Ryuta Tasaki | Junko Kōmura | May 10, 2015 |
Brain offers Go to join him in the Roidmudes and met 001. Go refuses and transforms as Mach to deal with Brain until Brain shows an important information on his tablet, stopping Mach. The next day, three series of robbery and murder happened with each bank had one of his workers killed. When the fourth bank under attack, Shinnosuke/Drive was deployed by the First Division. Drive arrives at the bank, where the robber first appears as a human before he reveals as a Fusion Evolution State Roidmude, Open Roidmude, where he displays the ability to open any doors and locks. One of the victims of the bank robbery that had escaped and witness Drive's battle with Open suddenly reminded of her past, which also takes place in a robbery. The girl faints as Drive manages to catch her but instead, leaving an opening for Open to escape. At the First Division office, the robber is revealed as Itsurou Negishi. As First Division members sent to arrest him, Shinnosuke requests Nira to involve him in this case, since Itsurou had killed his father 12 years ago. Nira allows the Special Investigation Unit members to help the First Division, only as office assistants. Kiriko asks Honganji on the history of Eisuke Tomari's death, as he narrates the story: 12 years ago, a robbery happened at the South Kuruma Eitou Bank where Itsurou and one of his subordinate held several victims in said bank as hostages. Eisuke happens to be there at the same time, waiting to act but when a robber targets a crying girl, Eisuke shielded her at the cost of his own life with the police forces arrived late and got the robbers arrested. However, actually that was how the story told by several officers at that time, with Honganji does sense something suspicious in it, as well as Mr. Belt theorizing 001's involvement in that case. While Shinnosuke on his way to deliver the First Division's lunches, he comes across Soichi Makage, whom commends him to work harder as a Kamen Rider. Shinnosuke suddenly realizes whom that person is, unaware of Makage's full identity. Heart visits Brain and asks of 001's progress but Brain refuses to return to Heart, as long as Medic keeps clinging into him. While the Special Investigation Unit arranges the First Division's files, Shinnosuke finds the truth behind the previous three victims: they were former workers of South Kuruma Eitou Bank. The previous bank had its worker, Tomoko Sannomaru being one of the former workers of said previous bank. Brain later enlists Open to eliminate everyone that becomes hostages from the South Kuruma Bank and that they are running out of time. Shinnosuke wanted to find Tomoko but she is currently interrogated by the First Division. Soon, he comes across one of the previous victims, Yukari Karasawa, the same girl he saved yesterday. He and Kiriko visits Yukari, but she yells at them to get away from her for unknown reasons. Genpachiro founded Shinnosuke and reveal some important information: according to Shingo Maruya, a former accomplice of Itsurou, who was freed six years ago after being reformed told that Itsurou didn't kill Eisuke, but it was somebody else, though his mind somehow clouded. An idea hits Shinnosuke and runs away. Rinna calls Kiriko and presents her the repaired Shift Speed Prototype. Shinnosuke tried to coerce Maruya to tell what happened in the past robbery but Maruya himself also had no idea. As Maruya cries, Shinnosuke notices a small snowflake scar behind his right ear. Shinnosuke returns to Tridoron and realises that Maruya's snowflake scar and its position is the similar one he saw on his late father sometime ago. Itsuro approaches Maruya and becomes Open Roidmude with the intent on killing him. Chase appears and wants to fight but still troubled over family relations involved in this situation again. Brain appears and presents Go as he transforms into Mach and fights Drive and Chaser. Chaser manages to save Maruya from Open while Drive and Mach fights in their strongest forms. Chaser manages to make an opening for him, Kiriko, Drive and Maruya get to safety.
| 30 | "Who Will Reveal the True Culprit?"; Transliteration: "Shin Hannin o Kataru no wa Dare ka" (Japanese: 真犯人を語るのは誰か) | Ryuta Tasaki | Junko Kōmura | May 17, 2015 |
Medic discusses with Heart the event of Go Shijima joining forces with them. While they did know that it was Brain's deed all along, but Heart somehow knows who is the true mastermind. At the same time, Brain gives Itsurou the list of eyewitnesses from the robbery that happened during 12 years ago. The day after Go betrays his team, Shinnosuke visits Chase, thanking him for opening his eyes to protect the people rather than seeking vengeance. Chase asks Shinnosuke about the importance of family members which Shinnosuke answers. With Kiriko unable to contact Go, she calls Chase and Shinnosuke and tells them that Maruya seems to have gained some part of his memory. Maruya reveals to the Special Investigation Unit that during the robbery, he, Itsurou and the hostages did feel the Heavy Acceleration effect, confirming a Roidmude activity at that time. As Chase looks into the snowflake scar at the back of Maruya's ear, he revealed a vital clue: Roidmude 001 has the ability to create ice threads that allows him to rewrite human memories, leaving behind said scar. Meaning that Go's turncoat and Maruya's inability to remember his past was all to conceal the event from 12 years ago. But Yukari had no scar, meaning that she may remember the event. While Chase, Kiriko and Shinnosuke exit the office, Honganji orders Rinna and Kyu to protect Maruya. Kiriko visits Yukari at the hospital and tries to force her to remember what happened in her past but she gets traumatized. Shinnosuke arrives and tells Kiriko to stop, realizing that 001's case had made them leave behind the police's number one priority: to protect the civilians. Chase calls Go as they get into a fight again, but after Chase wins, he looks behind Go's ear, revealing that Go has also fallen victim to 001's memory manipulation. At the Unit's office, Nira once again tries to bring Maruya away from them so that the First Division can grant him protection instead but thanks to Colorful Commercial, he witnesses a lot of Maruya's clones and gets confused. At the hospital's cafeteria, Yukari's mother reveals to Kiriko and Shinnosuke that Eisuke had protected her daughter and husband 12 years ago in that robbery and with Shinnosuke saving her yesterday, she can't help but to express her thanks to him. At Yukari's ward, Itsurou reveals himself and tries to kill her as Open Roidmude. Shinnosuke races himself to her ward and quickly saves her from Open as they escape. Once outside the hospital, Open tries to attack them again and as he fires at Yukari, Shinnosuke quickly shields her, triggering some of her past memory. Kamen Rider Chaser joins the battle, where both Riders performs Full Throttle finishers that separates Itsurou and kills Roidmude 067, ending his life. After arresting Itsurou, Shinnosuke realizes that he also became a victim of the brainwashing, evidenced by the snowflake scar behind his ear. Chase wanted to tell Kiriko what happened to Go but knowing how much she would be affected, he lies that Go has not fallen for 001's trance. Kiriko quickly remembers and gives him the fixed Shift Speed Prototype Car. Yukari thanks Shinnosuke and reveals that Roidmude 001 was indeed present at the robbery. After inserting the Shift Car, Chase regains his memories, but due to overload, it displays some of his final moments before being brainwashed by the first three Roidmudes, 001, 002 (Heart) and 003 (Brain). Much to Shinnosuke's surprise, 001 was revealed to be the Secretary of National Defense Bureau, Soichi Makage.
| 31 | "Why Did the Important Memories Disappear?"; Transliteration: "Taisetsu na Kioku wa Dōshite Kesareta no ka" (Japanese: 大切な記憶はどうして消されたのか) | Kyohei Yamaguchi | Keiichi Hasegawa | May 24, 2015 |
Shinnosuke met Brain, where he revealed that he now know who 001 is. As Brain in his Roidmude form fights Shinnosuke, the Shift Cars and Mr. Belt appear to his aid but even as Drive, Go/Mach interferes and attacks Drive again, in the end Drive fells into the sea as Mach and Brain walk away. At the Unit's office, Mr. Belt expressed his anger at Shinnosuke for putting his life in a gamble. As he leaves, Genpachiro enters and reveals their recent client, Toru Fujuki. His family runs a small factory and he always gets into a fight with his father. One day, he feels guilt of what he had done before when witnessing his father suffering from old age working. He wanted to apologize by taking over his work. However, his dad doesn't seem to know him and when Toru returns with his dad's favorite food, he vanished. He asked his mother and his workers where his father had gone but all of them replied that he had been gone for 10 years. The Unit suspects 001 behind this case. At the factory, Shinnosuke and Kiriko senses Heavy Acceleration particles. Toru confirms that he did sensed its presence while out to buy some dorayaki. Shinnosuke wonders what 001 wanted to do with Toru's father. 001 met Medic and asked her for some of her Reaper Legion soldiers. 001 commences that it is time for them to achieve evolution by using human emotions. He also noted that all of the executives had their corresponding emotion: Brain has envy, Medic has adoration, Heart has joy and 001, still unspecified but if these emotions had been spiked up, they will gain their final evolution. 001 later changed into his Advanced Form, Freeze Roidmude. Freeze states that Shinnosuke would become the catalyst to achieve his final evolution and Heart states that he had already found his desired person. Chase witnessed his memory and theorizes that if they achieve Super Evolution, it might as well related to the Promised Number. Kiriko visited Mr. Belt, where he was still recovering from the fear of losing Shinnosuke, having dreamt of Protodrive's defeat every night. While Shinnosuke spends the late night searching for clues, he received an e-mail from Mister X. The next day, Shinnosuke had finally get the bottom of the case, using Mister X's mail which reveals the medical record which from 2005 where at that year, the whole country had been alarmed of a huge epidermic. The National Defense Bureau released the information of the virus and mandated the test. The one in charge of that was Soichi Makage and in the end, no one was ever infected, meaning that a large agenda was hidden in there. Genpachiro phoned Shinnosuke, where he revealed that Toru had forgotten about them. Shinnosuke witnessed a snowflake scar behind his ear, meaning that Toru had also fallen victim to 001. Meeting Nira, Shinnosuke asked to arrange a meeting with Soichi Makage as he even revealed the truth about Makage but Nira refuses to believe even ripping off the evidence. As Tomari goes to the Tokyo Central Forum and meets Makage, exposing his true identity and fights with two Reaper Legion soldiers. Chase appears and attacks the Reapers while Shinnosuke confronts 001, asking what is he after but 001 shoots an energy snowflake that render him unconscious, with Kiriko and Mr. Belt arrived too late. 001 later freezes the whole place, wiping out the public's memory of him as a Roidmude. While Chaser fights the Reapers, Mach comes to aid them though he was later outmatched again and the Reapers were killed. Shinnosuke awakens, having retained his memory and approaches Makage again despite Mr. Belt's protest. As Shinnosuke and the others approach 001 again, the latter reveals his evolved form and how his ability works: it freezes the human memory and shatters it from inside. But other than Shinnosuke, he also had met one person whom also proved immune from the effect: Eisuke Tomari. Long ago, Eisuke suspected the police activity somehow being manipulated from inside. He suspected Makage and unmasked his true identity but even when 001 tried to erase it, it had no effect on Eisuke. Fearing the latter, it had awakened his corresponding emotion: humiliation. Shinnosuke as Drive Type Formula tried to attack him but proven futile due to his enormous ice power, even the Pit Crews being incapacitated.
| 32 | "What Is Waiting at the End of Evolution?"; Transliteration: "Shinka no Hate ni Matsu Mono wa Nani ka" (Japanese: 進化の果てに待つものはなにか) | Kyohei Yamaguchi | Keiichi Hasegawa | May 31, 2015 |
After Drive forcefully de-transformed from Freeze's snowstorm attack, Freeze decides to retreat, given that his strength is still incomplete. Chaser still fights Mach and the latter escapes after exchanging firepowers. At the Unit's office again, Mr. Belt gets into an argument again with Shinnosuke, as Honganji broke their fight and brings Krim away to cool him down. While Kiriko calms down Shinnosuke, Honganji brings Krim to his favourite scenery at the rooftop and calms him as well. In the Unit's discussion, the team try to figure out how to counter the memory manipulation effects made by Freeze. Chase reveals that another method of Freeze's memory manipulation was by replacing his target's memories related to a certain keyword with forged ones. Genpachiro and the First Division officers were among the victims, with his inability to pronounce Roidmude being unintentional. Kyu also reveals that other than Iwao Fujiki, there are other 20 serial kidnappings that happened using the mail sent in by Mister X, which started to happen since 12 years ago, the same year of Eisuke Tomari's death. Genpachiro tried to tell his employer Mitsuhide Nira that Makage is guilty for a lot of cases but as always, he turn on deaf's ears. Nira tried to report this to Makage since the Special Investigation Unit would eventually find the truth later on but Makage has no worries in his sight and even dismisses Nira, having no further use of him. Shinnosuke seeks Mr. Belt's help, wanting to remove Freeze's needles that injected to him so that they can create a cure to counter it. But even with Mad Doctor's help, Shinnosuke needs to be in the same condition he was injected with the needle, meaning that he has to be in his human state, which incredibly dangerous without Drive's armor. Chase in the other hand deals with Heart to get an answer the meaning behind the Roidmude's Super Evolution. But for Heart to achieve it, he has to find a worthy opponent. After the extraction of Freeze's needles ended, Genpachiro reveals that all of the abduction is truly Makage's work, as the victim's families had no memories of them. But even with that piece of evidence, only one clue left to find (the reason for Makage to kidnap Iwao). Rinna brings the finished antidote and sprays on Genpachiro, finally enabling him to pronounce Roidmude correctly for the first time. Shinnosuke deduces that Freeze is conducting a huge experiment and Nira arrives, as he delivers a list of unused buildings with large consumptions of electricity. Nira apologises to them for what he had done in the past, thus confirming the fact that 001 indeed manipulating the police officers. Chase visits Mr. Belt and advises to help Shinnosuke under the duty of a Kamen Rider. Shinnosuke first visits Toru and tries to help him get his memories back but fails until the dorayaki he bought sometime ago had helped him. When Honganji reads Shinnosuke's prediction of the day, he realises that it was the same one back in the day where his father died: Super Unlucky. Finding the location of an abandoned building with large electricity consumptions, Shinnosuke, Kiriko and Genpachiro storm in and finds all of the kidnapped victims in stasis. Freeze, Brain and Go appears as he reveals that this place is a hidden experiment facility. Ever since 12 years ago, Freeze tries to find the source of his humiliation so he kidnaps people that can withstand his memory manipulation ability like Shinnosuke. Also noted that the great nationwide pandemic that happened 10 years ago was a setup. Shinnosuke and his father was gifted but he wasn't capable of finding the reason why other humans like them can withstand his ability. Toru soon appears and reveals that it was his father's dream that allows him to retain his memories. After Toru reunites with his father, Shinnosuke concludes that no matter how strong his ability is, they will never reach a person with a higher spirit, awakening Mr. Belt's senses and finally allows Shinnosuke to transform and fights Freeze. Chaser joins the battle as well and fights Deadheat Mach and Brain. While it seems that Drive Type Formula successfully kills Freeze, but his Core survives and creates a new body, which evolves him into Super Evolution State, defeating Drive with a single attack. While Mr. Belt appears to be shut down, Genpachiro checks on Shinnosuke's heart, confirming that he is dead.
| 33 | "Who Claimed the Life of Shinnosuke Tomari?"; Transliteration: "Dare ga Tomari Shin'nosuke no Inochi o Ubatta no ka" (Japanese: だれが泊進ノ介の命を奪ったのか) | Satoshi Morota | Riku Sanjo | June 7, 2015 |
After Shinnosuke is defeated, Freeze, Mach and Brain make their leave. While the public is informed of Shinnosuke's death, his colleagues from the Special Division mourn his body at the morgue, where they learned that by some reason, both the Shift Brace and Mr. Belt are attached to his body and can't be removed, while Kiriko remains at her apartment. Willing to at least rescue Go for his sister's sake, Chase obtains a sample of the antidote and invades the Roidmude's hideout but is stopped from using it on him by Freeze, who attacks in sequence. However, Go takes the opportunity to steal Brain's tablet computer and escapes with Chase. Once in a safe place, Go reveals that he had the same resistance to Freeze's brainwashing as Shinnosuke's and was pretending to be under his control all this time in order to spy on the Roidmudes and obtain the tablet, which contains crucial info on them, but blames himself for not protecting Shinnosuke in order to not expose his cover and believes that all his efforts were useless because of it, knowing that Kiriko is suffering with his death, but Chase insists for him to not give up, sharing with him what he learned about Shinnosuke's condition. After Chase leaves, Go opens the tablet, which was revealed to contain the memories of his late father, and asks for its help. Go later pays a visit to Kiriko and apologizes to her, giving her a small notebook he believes will help her revive Shinnosuke. Back at the Drive pit, Rinna informs the others that Shinnosuke's body is still preserved and that somehow Mr. Belt must be acting as a life support system for him, and has an idea of using the Shift Cars and Tridoron to revive Shinnosuke using the newly completed Shift Tridoron Shift Car and when Kiriko arrives with the formulas contained in the Notebook from Go, which Rinna uses to complete her calculations, Go's undercover mission is revealed, and the others conclude that Mister X was none other than Go himself. However, for the plan to work, Tridoron, containing Shinnosuke, must be acclelerated to 200 Km/h and Kiriko offers herself to pilot it. The members of the division then relocate to a long roadtrack, where Kiriko starts driving Tridoron with Shinnosuke inside, but Freeze appears to interfere. Kamen Rider Chaser confronts Freeze, but fails to prevent him from stopping Tridoron. However, the experiment is a success and a revived Shinnosuke emerges, with Mr. Belt's consciousness now fused with his, and able to briefly take over his body as well, and transforms into Kamen Rider Drive Type Tridoron, using his new feature, the "Tire Blending" to transform into Type Tridoron Attack 1-2-3, defeating the enemy with certain ease. Shinnosuke then rejoices with the others, certain that he finally managed to avenge his father, but before perishing, Freeze reveals that he was not the one responsible for Eisuke Tomari's death, and affirms that Shinnosuke will fall into despair upon knowing all the truth.
| 34 | "Who Claimed the Life of Eisuke Tomari?"; Transliteration: "Dare ga Tomari Eisuke no Inochi o Ubatta no ka" (Japanese: だれが泊英介の命を奪ったのか) | Satoshi Morota | Riku Sanjo | June 14, 2015 |
Kiriko reports to Shinnosuke of another case, where they are tasked to scan Heavy Acceleration particles at the Metropolitan Police Forensic Science Lab. Forensic Technician Mariko Minowa (a fan of Shinnosuke/Kamen Rider Drive) reports that while she was eating at the lab, a Heavy Acceleration wave was released and several files had been stolen though she had no idea of whom it belonged to. Suddenly, the Shift Cars have track the culprit as they are fighting it, whom turns out to be the Fusion Evolution State Roidmude Thief Roidmude. Thief tries to run but forces to fight Drive and during the conflict, a file that was stolen ejected from his body. Panicked, Thief endangers several civilians and Drive assumes Type Tridoron People Saver, capturing Thief in Justice Cage, saving an injured victim with Cure Quicker and rescued a nearly fallen one with Ladder Expander. Brain appears and saves Thief from his imprisonment. Brain lashes Thief for being clumsy, having depressed after the theft of his tablet and his favourite senior's demise. Brain assures that he will achieve Super Evolution and become a member of the Promised Number. As revealed by Genpachiro, Shizuo Shigeta, the head of forensics lab physical department had been reported missing a few weeks ago. Kiriko suspects him as a host for the Fusion Evolution State but Mariko denies it, knowing him as an honest person. She suddenly knows what was stolen which is the evidence Shizuo was looking for. Witnessing one of the files that dropped by Thief Roidmude, Shinnosuke realizes that the cases are the ones that related to his father's death from 12 years ago. At the Unit's office, Nira decided that they need to keep this a secret for a while. Those who had recovered from Freeze's memory manipulation start to regain their true memories. Nira is at wit's end as he was forced to hold the responsibility for Makage's death. Captain Shizuo coincidentally was investigating the robbery from 12 years ago, thus being targeted by Thief. Shinnosuke remembers the gun that killed his father may have a piece of evidence, and Nira gives him a list of facilities that used by Makage and theorizes that one of them may be secretly affiliated to him. As Shinnosuke and Kiriko storms one of the facility listed, Heart appears and challenges Shinnosuke. He demonstrates his Super Heavy Acceleration ability, with Shift Deadheat and Formula come to rescue Kiriko and Drive. To make up for his failures, Brain offers himself to attack Kiriko, but finds himself facing Chaser. Chaser calls Drive for a retreat as Drive cancels Heart's Super Heaviness and escapes. Go at the same time tries to find a place to house Dr. Banno's A.I., and for the first time acknowledge him as a father. Shinnosuke wonders how Heart is capable of finding him in the facility, thus sensing something else. At the Unit's office, Honganji presents Shinnosuke, Kiriko and Nira a new batch of antidotes manufactured by Rinna. In somewhere else, Thief orders the captured Capt. Shizuo to solve the case, giving him the stolen evidences. Shizuo realises that the bullet is from a different gun than the one that shot Eisuke. Brain and Thief forces him to remember back the gun that he hid 12 years ago while he was under Makage's spell. Honganji appears and reveals that the gun has his fingerprints, making Thief's host as the murderer of Eisuke. With Makage died, he feared that the erased memories will appear and thus fused with the Roidmude to destroy the evidence. Drive appears and separates Thief, revealing Roidmude 106 and worst, Mitsuhide Nira. He was the only one knew which facility Shinnosuke and Kiriko were after and they put up an act to track him with the antidote bottle that placed with a tracker. Nira reveals that he and Eisuke are partners and he grew jealous of Eisuke's escalating success. He tried various ways to get famous but Eisuke outsmarted him and advice not to take shortcut in solving cases. What happened in the robbery from 12 years ago is a coincidence. Makage/001 lured Eisuke to the bank with an anonymous tip. He and Nira entered the bank in disguise of ordinary customers and when the robbery happened, Eisuke covered a little girl when she cried. Itsuro Negishi eas just pointing his gun to Eisuke and when his acquaintance, Maruya stepped back, Nira secretly knocked him. Negishi decided to dropped his gun but while doing so, Nira, whom was targeted him switched to Eisuke and instead killed him out of jealousy. It was then 001 appeared and erase the memories of everyone from the robbery but ordered Nira to obey him for the price. He hid the gun as long as Nira had his loyalty for 001. Makage soon orders Shizuo to hide the real gun and the shooter's identity while erased the latter's memory from it. Nira's jealousy spiked and Brain orders 106 to re-merge with him to become Thief Roidmude. Drive as Type Tridoron fights Thief and managed to separate him from Nira but once did so, Brain brings Nira away and turns 106 into a Giant Bat Roidmude. Drive rides Booster Tridoron and finishes 106 with Rider Break. Shinnosuke tries to search the gun but realises it has been taken away. The forensics decided to help him from inside by finding other evidences as alternatives. At the rooftop, Brain absorbs Nira's jealousy and finally gains his Super Evolution.
| 35 | "Why Did the Besiege Incident Happen?"; Transliteration: "Rōjō Jiken wa Naze Okita no ka" (Japanese: ろう城事件はなぜ起きたのか) | Kyohei Yamaguchi | Keiichi Hasegawa | June 28, 2015 |
The episode begins with the Special Investigation Division's Building surrounded by the police, and Nira holding Shinnosuke at gunpoint. 20 hours before, as his colleagues discuss about Nira's whereabouts, Shinnosuke and Chase stand guard to protect Yukari, who is an important witness against Nira, when Nira himself appears to attack her as the Thief Roidmude. During the fight, Kamen Riders Drive and Chaser realize that the Roidmude Nira is now fused with is actually Brain, and the enemy attempts to kidnap Yukari, but Mach appears to save her and force them to retreat. Chase asks Go about the tablet in his possession and its connection with his father, but he urges him to not reveal anything about it to Kiriko, and Chase replies that he will do so as long as he uses it to help her, just like he did when he assisted in Shinnosuke's revival. Elsewhere, Medic inquires Brain about his plans and he reveals to her that he attained the Super Evolution. Brain then attacks Medic, who is powerless before his new form, until Heart appears to stop him and congratulate him for his feat. While escorting Yukari home, Chase has a glimpse of something strange in her right wrist, where she was attacked by the Thief Roidmude, thus he sends Shift Speed Prototype to watch over her. Later at night, Nira and Brain hold a press conference revealing that Makage was in fact a Roidmude, but falsely accusing the Special Investigation Division of collaborating with him, misleading the public using the info regarding all previous cases in which the members of the Division were personally involved, and the fact that Chase was once Masshin Chaser. With the police and the public opinion suddenly turned against them, Kiriko and the others cover for Shinnosuke to escape before he is arrested with them as well, and spends all night running from the cops until reuniting with Mr. Belt, who was brought to him by the Shift Cars, just as the Thief Roidmude appears to fight him. Transforming into Kamen Rider Drive, Shinnosuke fights Nira, with assistance from Chaser, who arrives soon after to separate Nira and Brain. Shinnosuke then chases after Nira, while Chaser is impeded by Brain, who easily defeats him with his new powers. Meanwhile, Heart appears before Go asking him to return the tablet, but he refuses and prepares to fight him as well. Shinnosuke follows Nira to the Special Investigation Division Building, leading to the current situation at the beginning of the episode. Yukari watches the siege on the building at a TV when she collapses in the middle of the street, and imprisoned with the others, Kiriko prays for the safety of Go, who is about to face Heart as Deadheat Mach, Chase who lies uncounscious and Shinnosuke who finds himself at Nira's mercy.
| 36 | "Where Will the Bullet Guide Justice?"; Transliteration: "Jūdan wa doko ni Seigi o Michibiku no ka" (Japanese: 銃弾はどこに正義を導くのか) | Kyohei Yamaguchi | Keiichi Hasegawa | July 5, 2015 |
Brain enters the room and both Nira and Brain reveal that their ultimate objective is to force Shinnosuke to throw away his pride as an officer and as a Kamen Rider by killing Nira. The pair then show him an image of Yukari lying down under effect of Brain's neurotoxin and reveal that she will die in less than an hour unless Shinnosuke kills Nira with his gun, threatening to use the poison in her body to kill her instantly if Shinnosuke attempts to resist. Chase, who was warned about her condition by Shift Speed Prototype, attempts to save her with Mad Doctor to no avail and then flees away with her. Meanwhile, Heart defeats Deadheat Mach but just as he is about to retrieve the tablet, Prof. Banno attacks him and knocks him down. When Medic appears to awaken him, Go had already fled with the tablet. Back to the office, Nira and Brain steal Mr. Belt and all of the Shift Cars in Shinnosuke's possession and put them in a bag. Brain then leaves the building, claiming to the police that Shinnosuke is holding Nira hostage and intends to kill him, while Chase takes Yukari to Go for Banno to use its powers to treat her. Brain watches through a monitor as Nira keeps provoking Shinnosuke into killing him, when the video feed is briefly cut, and after the video is restored, the time limit set by Brain ends and Shinnosuke decides to pull his gun and shoot at Nira, but he ends up missing the target by purpose. Nira then shoots at Shinnosuke with the same gun he used to kill Eisuke and apparently kills him. Some time later, Nira and Brain hold another press conference claiming that Nira shot Shinnosuke at self-defense and that Yukari was a victim of the Kamen Riders, when both Yukari and Shinnosuke arrive, much to their surprise, to expose their lies. It is then revealed that Prof. Banno saved Yukari by digitizing her body inside the tablet and then returning her back, free from the poison, and that afterwards Go and Chase sent a message to Shinnosuke showing that she was fine when the video feed was briefly cut. It is also revealed that Shinnosuke hinted Mr. Belt to send him Dimension Cab, which he used to stop the bullet when Nira shot at him. Shinnosuke then shows a rifling exam comparing the bullet he took and the one that killed his father twelve years before, confirming that both came from the same gun and proving that Nira is the true culprit. Nira and Brain then fuse to attack the Kamen Riders, sending some other Roidmudes as well, but Drive Type Tridoron, Deadheat Mach and Chaser easily defeat them. Brain then decides to face all three Riders in his Super Evolved form, just to be defeated by a triple Rider Kick, albeit his core survives and escapes. As Nira is arrested for his crimes, Shinnosuke rejoices as he finally has brought his father's murderer to justice, while a defenseless Brain is tortured by Medic for all the humiliation he caused to her, and Heart realizes that the tablet containing Prof. Banno's conscience is a threat that can't be ignored.
| 37 | "Who Is Searching for the Ultimate Flavor?"; Transliteration: "Kyūkyoku no Mikaku o Nerau no wa Dare ka" (Japanese: 究極の味覚を狙うのはだれか) | Kenzo Maihara | Riku Sanjo | July 12, 2015 |
A person suddenly starts burning into flames, while walking through a flea market, revealing himself as a Roidmude. Kamen Rider Drive Type Tridoron appears in sequence and destroys it using the People Saver Tire Blending while tending to the civilians. After the battle, Shinnosuke retrieves some burn pieces of paper and returns to the Special Unit Headquarters, where the officers rejoice as their efforts are finally recognized by the main force and state that there are only forty-five Roidmudes left to be defeated, including Brain, who barely survived the last fight thanks to his Over-Evolution. While discussing the recent fights with Roidmudes whose bodies were also in fire, the team is informed by Kyu that he tracked down the traces of paper Shinnosuke found to a mysterious restaurant called Suprême, which is known for their famous "Golden Sauce". While Shinnosuke, Kiriko, Genpachi and Kyu inquire the restaurant's chef Masatarou Okumura and enjoy the food, Heart greets the Roidmudes 006 and 008 who had just returned from overseas and gives him three instructions; to deal with the Kamen Riders; to achieve the Over-Evolution in order to help reach the Promised Number; and to retrieve the tablet containing Prof. Banno, or destroy it. However, they also warn Heart about the Roidmude immolating incidents and claim that someone is plotting behind his back. Meanwhile, Chase approaches Go and Banno, thanking for their help, and asking for them to join Shinnosuke and Krim's side but they refuse, as Go still wants to prevent Kiriko from learning the truth and Banno claims that he and Krim will never see eye to eye, when Roidmude 006 appears to attack them, and when he and his entourage prove themselves too strong for Kamen Riders Chaser and Mach, Chaser covers for Mach and Banno to escape. Back to the Drive Pit, despite Shinnosuke and the others still find themselves ecstatic with the food from Suprême, Krim did not find anything strange on it, but the team discovered during their stay that there are some missing names from the reservation list, and return in the next day to investigate further.
| 38 | "Why Does the Devil Still Want to Evolve?"; Transliteration: "Akuma wa Naze Shinka o Motometsuzukeru no ka" (Japanese: 悪魔はなぜ進化を求め続けるのか) | Kenzo Maihara | Riku Sanjo | July 19, 2015 |
Shinnosuke tries to stop the Cook Roidmude before it can create something to make Heart even stronger.
| 39 | "Where Will the Whirlwind Kidnappers Strike Next?"; Transliteration: "Senpū no Yūkaihan wa Itsu Osottekuru no ka" (Japanese: 旋風の誘拐犯はいつ襲って来るのか) | Takayuki Shibasaki | Riku Sanjo | July 26, 2015 |
A series of kidnapping happens where Roidmude 008 approaches in every couple's car and kidnaps the woman. The Special Investigation Unit decides to take the case. Go wants to participate but forced to withdraw due to lack of driving licence and forced to sit in for the test along with Chase. As Rinna, Genpachiro, Kiriko and Shinnosuke disguise themselves as couples and get into action, Mr. Belt (in possession of Shift Formula) visits Go, as the latter introduces him to Banno, which makes Krim feel uneasy, to the point of him imprisoned in a tablet further "steals" Krim's concept as the Drive Driver. Rinna and Genpachiro meets 008 in their, alerting Shinnosuke, Kiriko, Mr. Belt and Go. As Go about to leave his test, he faces 006 and his goons again, fighting them as Mach. Chase halts his test for a while and helps Mach as 006 escapes again, leaving his goons destroyed. As 008 abouts to kidnap Rinna, he leaves her as he had "made a mistake", infuriating her until Shinnosuke arrives. 008 express his gratitude to meet Drive and reveals his evolved form, Tornado. Drive Type Formula fights Tornado, but finds Tornado is stronger than him due to the Roidmude stating he is approaching his Super Evolution, forcing Mr. Belt to take over as Type Tridoron. After a brief fight, Tornado escapes. Drive then cancels his transformation while another Krim Stienbelt from a future time is watching them from a distance. Go checks his bag but finds Banno has left it and Chase resumes his driving test. At the Unit's office, Rinna can't stop grieving after Tornado calls her "a mistake" with Genpachiro resting at the hospital. Kyu finally finds the man Tornado copied: George Shirogane, a globe throttling fashion designer but not much information specified about him. Krim suggests the Unit to visit the Drive Pit to analyze Tornado's abilities and as the enter, Banno is in the Drive Pit analyzing the blueprints of Drive's gear and equipment. He then reveals himself to the team and his details as Kiriko and Go's birth father, as well as the creator of Roidmudes. Banno offers them his help but Krim rejects the offer, calling Banno a "devil". Banno presents the Unit Tornado's base after he manages to analyze his movements. Arriving at the hideout, Shinnosuke, Go and Kiriko finds the victims and Heart and Tornado reveals themselves, allowing the three to take them back since none of them are catalysts for his Super Evolution. As the Kamen Riders fight against the Roidmudes, Tornado sees Kiriko as his perfect woman and kidnaps her but before Drive and Mach about to save her, Banno in Ride Booster Red attacks the Riders and the blast of its gunfire made Drive fall off the cliff. This leaves Mach struggling to fight Heart, who stops the Rider from trying to rescue Drive. With Shinnosuke weakened and badly injured, Roidmude 004 reveals himself and kidnaps Mr. Belt.
| 40 | "Why Did the Two Genius Researchers Clash?"; Transliteration: "Futari no Tensai Kagakusha wa Naze Shōtotsu Shita no ka" (Japanese: 2人の天才科学者はなぜ衝突したのか) | Takayuki Shibasaki | Riku Sanjo | August 2, 2015 |
With Deadheat Mach is in a pinch, Chase appears and allows him to handle Tornado. Soon, Mach entered Burst State and attacks Heart long enough to escape. Go reunites with the injured Shinnosuke, and Heart appears as he reveals that Banno was just using them to get Krim and begins to tell them of his past. At the Drive Pit, Rinna discovers that Banno had rampaged on the base and had hijacked a Ride Booster. Using the stolen data and Krim, Banno and 004 constructs a new Drive Driver for him to host so that he can live freely by taking over any host. Meanwhile, Banno also prepares a "special gift" for Krim. As narrated by Heart, in 1999, the Roidmude development was a small success, as they had develop sentience. 002 was forced to copy an entrepreneur that Banno hate for refusing to fund his project and being tortured as if the entrepreneur was in his place. Krim found the madness Banno was in and declared an end to their partnership. After Krim left, Banno placed a chip with evil programming into the three Roidmudes, the very object that allows them to achieve evolution in the modern days. Even Shinnosuke confirms that Heart was right because of Kiriko's early testimony, stating that whenever she asked her mother about Banno, she had a gloomy face. Go becomes heartbroken when he realized himself being used. Using the Ride Booster Red's trace, Shinnosuke dashes into Banno's hideout and rescues Mr. Belt but he realized that he's too late as Banno has uploaded his mind into his new Drive Driver body and escapes with 004. Back at the Drive Pit, the team wonders why did Tornado wants to Super Evolve with a woman's beauty, and at that time Kyu arrives with the answer. George's dream is to put a necklace into a woman it fits the best and marries her at a church nearby a beach. Shinnosuke storms the church, now knows that the real George Shirogane is dead before Tornado copied him. Drive tries to attack Tornado but trapped in a storm created by him. Mach frees him and declares that he will destroy any evil on Earth, even if it his own father. Chase rescues Kiriko and now with his new driving license, he drives Booster Tridoron in Type Wild for Mach and Drive to finish Tornado. Heart watches from afar as he congratulates Go for being "strong". Go finally gets his driving license and decides to surpass his father instead of running away. Kiriko and Shinnosuke comfort him, with Chase finally calls him by his first name. Brain jumps happily after getting on his feet again. 006 appears and reveals 008's demise as he declares himself going to achieve Super Evolution. Medic whispers to herself that she wants to become a part of the Promised Number.
| 41 | "How Was the Golden Drive Born?"; Transliteration: "Ōgon no Doraibu wa Dō Yatte Umareta no ka" (Japanese: 黄金のドライブはどうやって生まれたのか) | Kyohei Yamaguchi | Keiichi Hasegawa | August 9, 2015 |
Shinnosuke investigates a hospital where people are collapsing without reason, and that all of the young women patients are saying they want to meet someone named "Sho". On top of that, Shinnosuke discovers that one of the patients in the hospital is the young woman Medic is masquerading as.
| 42 | "Where Is the Goddess' Truth?"; Transliteration: "Megami no Shinjitsu wa Doko ni Aru no ka" (Japanese: 女神の真実はどこにあるのか) | Kyohei Yamaguchi | Keiichi Hasegawa | August 16, 2015 |
Shinnosuke's investigation leads him to find out that the life of the girl is in danger, while Medic seeks Banno's help in her desperate pursue to reach the Over-Evolution.
| 43 | "When Will the Second Global Freeze Start?"; Transliteration: "Dai Ni no Gurōbaru Furīzu wa Itsu Okiru no ka" (Japanese: 第二のグローバルフリーズはいつ起きるのか) | Hidenori Ishida | Riku Sanjo | August 23, 2015 |
Shinnosuke is distraught with the idea that Chase claims to be in love with Kiriko and realizes his own feelings for her. Meanwhile, Banno takes control of the remaining Roidmudes in order to move on towards his master plan, which involves drawing the world to a second Global Freeze.
| 44 | "Who Had Loved Heart the Most?"; Transliteration: "Dare ga Hāto o Ichiban Aishiteita ka" (Japanese: だれがハートを一番愛していたか) | Hidenori Ishida | Riku Sanjo | August 30, 2015 |
Kiriko is wounded in the fight with Gold Drive, and while Drive takes her to the hospital, Chaser and Mach take on the evil Kamen Rider and Roidmude #004. Elsewhere, Brain investigates Medic's body and discovers something shocking hidden inside her mind concerning Heart.
| 45 | "What Is the Roidmudes' Final Dream?"; Transliteration: "Roimyūdo no Saigo no Yume to wa Nani ka" (Japanese: ロイミュードの最後の夢とはなにか) | Takayuki Shibasaki | Riku Sanjo | September 6, 2015 |
Gold Drive attacks the Drive Pit, preventing the Kamen Riders from being able to fight him off as he prepares to create the second Global Freeze.
| 46 | "Why Did They Have to Fight?"; Transliteration: "Karera wa Naze Tatakawanakereba Naranakatta no ka" (Japanese: 彼らはなぜ戦わなければならなかったのか) | Takayuki Shibasaki | Riku Sanjo | September 13, 2015 |
Using the Signal Bike from the now deceased Chase, Go transforms into Kamen Rider Chaser Mach to keep fighting in his honour, while Drive, Heart and Medic come across Banno's ultimate creation, Sigma.
| 47 | "Who Will You Entrust the Future to, My Friend?"; Transliteration: "Tomo yo, Kimi wa Dare ni Mirai o Takusu no ka" (Japanese: 友よ、君はだれに未来を託すのか) | Takayuki Shibasaki | Riku Sanjo | September 20, 2015 |
Shinnosuke destroys Sigma and saves the world with the help of Heart, who dies from his wounds soon after. With the Roidmudes all but defeated, the time for the Special Investigation Division to be disbanded is at hand, as well as the moment for Shinnosuke and Mr. Belt to part ways.
| 48 | "The Case of Ghost"; Transliteration: "Gōsuto no Jiken" (Japanese: ゴーストの事件) | Osamu Kaneda | Nobuhiro Mouri | September 27, 2015 |
The Metro Police Department gets involved with a dangerous organization that Shinnosuke and Hayase were investigating one year ago, assisted by a mysterious Kamen Rider who appears to help them.
