= List of Kamen Rider Decade characters =

Kamen Rider Decade (仮面ライダーディケイド(ＤＣＤ), Kamen Raidā Dikeido) is a Japanese tokusatsu series that serves as the 19th installment in the Kamen Rider franchise and the 10th entry in the Heisei era. These characters exist amongst various iterations of reality within the series referred to as an A.R. World (Another Rider's/Alternate Reality World).

== Main characters ==
=== Hikari Studio ===
The Hikari Studio (光写真館, Hikari Shashinkan) is the photography studio that the Hikari family owns and where Tsukasa Kadoya develops his photographs. The various backdrops located in the studio allow it to transport its occupants to a multitude of parallel worlds. Its interior and exterior automatically transform to blend into the surroundings when moving across dimensions.

==== Tsukasa Kadoya ====
Tsukasa Kadoya (門矢 士, Kadoya Tsukasa) is a hypocritical and self-righteous man whose had no memory of his past, having a strong desire to "catch the world" using his photos. But the fact that Tsukasa's photos never develop well hint him to be from another world while unaware of the effect as prelude of a convergence of the alternate dimensions known as A.R. Worlds that threaten the main universe. Approached by Wateru Kurenai while acquiring the DecaDriver, Tsukasa begins a journey to other Kamen Riders' worlds to save the prime universe as Kamen Rider Decade. But as Decade, besides exhibiting in-depth knowledge of a world he is in, Tsukasa faces both threats that endanger the worlds and the interference of Narutaki who spreads rumors of him as a "devil" (悪魔, akuma). But Tsukasa soon understands what Narutaki meant upon learning that he was originally the Great Leader of the Dai-Shocker organization which sought to take all dimensions and that his true mission is to destroy the other A.R. World Riders and their worlds. Tsukasa undertakes the role, sealing the A.R. World Riders in cards before being fatally wounded by Natsumi when she becomes Kamen Rider Kiva-la. His death being the catalyst for the restoration of all the A.R. Worlds and those who died during the Rider War, Tsukasa is revived by his friends' memories as he, the revived Kamen Riders, and Kamen Rider W defeat the newly formed Super Shocker and the revived Neo Organism. Afterwards, Tsukasa and his friends return to the Hikari Studio to continue their journey across the A.R. Worlds.

Tsukasa utilizes the DecaDriver (ディケイドライバー, Dikeidoraibā) belt and Rider Cards (ライダーカード, Raidā Kādo) to transform into Kamen Rider Decade. While transformed, he wields the Ride Booker (ライドブッカー, Raido Bukkā), which can switch between Book Mode (ブックモード, Bukku Mōdo), Gun Mode (ガンモード, Gan Mōdo), and Sword Mode (ソードモード, Sōdo Mōdo). He can also use the Kamen Ride Cards (カメンライドカード, Kamen Raido Kādo) to assume the form of a past Kamen Rider and the Form Ride Cards (フォームライドカード, Fōmu Raido Kādo), Attack Ride Cards (アタックライドカード, Atakku Raido Kādo), and/or Final Attack Ride Cards (ファイナルアタックライドカード, Fainaru Atakku Raido Kādo) to access their arsenal as well as the Final Form Ride Cards (ファイナルフォームライドカード, Fainaru Fōmu Raido Kādo) to transform another Kamen Rider into a new form for a combo attack. His personal vehicle is the Machine Decader (マシンディケイダー, Mashin Dikeidā) motorcycle, which similar to Decade himself can assume the form of a past Kamen Rider's motorcycle via the Attack Ride Cards.

While in the World of Negatives, Tsukasa acquires the K-Touch (ケータッチ, Kētatchi) cellphone that attaches onto the DecaDriver, replacing the card slot which is moved to his right hip, to enable him to assume Complete Form (コンプリートフォーム, Konpurīto Fōmu) where he gains the ability to manipulate the power of his nine Heisei Kamen Rider predecessors' final forms, whom he can summon through the K-Touch, for powerful combo attacks. A stronger variation of the form is Strongest Complete Form (最強コンプリートフォーム, Saikyō Konpurīto Fōmu), which has the Kamen Ride Cards of his predecessors' final forms on his armor.

During the events of the crossover film Kamen Rider × Kamen Rider W & Decade: Movie War 2010, Tsukasa assumes the destructive embodiment of his Rider form known as Violent Emotion (激情態, Gekijōtai), which allows him to use any Attack Ride Card without having to transform into the associated Rider, until he is defeated by Natsumi as Kamen Rider Kiva-la.

During the events of the crossover film Kamen Rider × Super Sentai: Super Hero Taisen, Narutaki restores Dai-Shocker and enters an alliance with the Super Sentai villains that formed the Dai-Zangyack. Tsukasa, feigning to resume his role as Dai-Shocker's leader, declares war on the Super Sentai and battled Captain Marvelous of the Gokaigers to an epic standstill before faking their deaths to catch the villains off guard once they reveal their actual plan to take over the world. Tsukasa also appears in the Kamen Rider Wizard finale when summoned by the sorcerer Amadum to attack Haruto Soma, only to aid his successor in defeating the villain before departing for points unknown.

Tsukasa later returns in Kamen Rider Zi-O to help change Sougo Tokiwa's destiny and ensure he becomes a hero instead of a tyrant, using an upgraded version of the DecaDriver called the Neo DecaDriver (ネオディケイドライバー, Neo Dikeidoraibā) to access the forms and powers of his successors up to Kamen Rider Zi-O. During the events of the special episode Rider Time: Kamen Rider Zi-O vs. Decade: Seven Of Zi-O!, he acquires an upgraded version of the K-Touch called the K-Touch 21 (ケータッチ21, Kētatchi Toenti Wan) that allows him to assume an evolution of Complete Form called Complete Form 21 (コンプリートフォーム21, Konpurīto Fōmu Tuenti Wan), which grants access to the powers of his successors' final forms up to Kamen Rider Zero-Two.

Tsukasa Kadoya is portrayed by Masahiro Inoue (井上 正大, Inoue Masahiro). As a child, Tsukasa is portrayed by Riku Ichikawa (市川 理矩, Ichikawa Riku).

==== Natsumi Hikari ====
Natsumi Hikari (光 夏海, Hikari Natsumi), referred to as "Natsumikan" (夏蜜柑, Natsumikan; Summer Mikan) by Tsukasa, is a young woman who works at the photo studio under her grandfather, having lived with him since her childhood. Prior to the series, Natsumi was a member of the Taigaku Club (退学クラブ, Taigaku Kurabu), or TG Club (TGクラブ, Tī Jī Kurabu) for short, a group of dropouts who got bored with school and wanted to find out their own answers. But they never carry out their intent and return to school, promising to meet again years later. At the start, Natsumi begins to have nightmares of Decade prior to finding Decade's belt and giving it to Tsukasa. Fully aware of world's endangerment, Natsumi decides to accompany Tsukasa on his journey to prevent her dream from coming true.

She occasionally keeps Tsukasa in line with the Hikari Family Secret Technique: Laughing Pressure Point (光家秘伝・笑いのツボ, Hikari-ke Hiden - Warai no Tsubo) but she had also used the technique on other people such as Yusuke and her grandfather. She also appears to have feelings for Tsukasa, or at least cares for his well-being, which is hinted during her conversation with Yusuke Onodera. Despite Narutaki's offer to save her, she refuses and chooses to see Decade's journey to the end.

However she starts worrying during the time in the World of Hibiki after hearing from Narutaki that Decade's action is actually destroying the world. While in the World of Shinkenger, Natsumi assures Tsukasa that the Photo Studio is his home before her near-death experience by Apollo Geist in the World of RX, learning that Tsukasa used some of his life to save her later. It is only after their adventures in the World of Amazon that Natsumi ponders if there's a point behind their journey.

In Kamen Rider Decade: The Last Story, Natsumi becomes Kamen Rider Kiva-la (仮面ライダーキバーラ, Kamen Raidā Kibāra) with the use of Kiva-la, but unlike Kiva the belt does not materialize first and it does not require Kiva-la's bite. Instead, it is a kiss to the user's forehead, which then creates a heart-shaped emblem and she becomes the Kiva-la Belt (キバーラベルト, Kibāra Beruto) after transformation. Also different is that Kiva-la does not perch on her belt during the transformation. As Kamen Rider Kiva-la, Natsumi wields the Kiva-la Saber (キバーラサーベル, Kibāra Sāberu), with which she can use the butt to perform a variation of her trademark "Laughing Pressure Point". Natsumi transforms into Kamen Rider Kiva-la to stop Decade Violent Emotion's rampage, being described as the only one able to do so. She later transforms to help Decade, Kuuga, and Diend defeat the rest of Super Shocker, as well as rescue her grandfather from the Super Crisis Fortress. Like Kiva, Kamen Rider Kiva-la's motif is that of a bat.

Natsumi Hikari is portrayed by Kanna Mori (森 カンナ, Mori Kanna).

==== Eijiro Hikari ====
Eijiro Hikari (光 栄次郎, Hikari Eijirō) is the owner of the Hikari Studio and Natsumi's grandfather. When he discovers that his photo studio is the means of accessing the A.R. Worlds by accident, he is not surprised but amused at the fact and is glad to assist Tsukasa in his mission. Whenever they arrive to a different world, he cooks a different meal each time. Eijiro is also the most easygoing of the group and gets along well with Kiva-la.

In the World of Decade, Eijiro is revealed to be a guise assumed by Shocker's Doctor Death (死神博士, Shinigami Hakase), an executive member of Dai-Shocker from Switzerland. Doctor Death has the ability to assume the form of the squid-like cyborg Ikadevil (イカデビル, Ikadebiru), which he claims is his greatest creation. Though seemingly killed in the final battle by Decade, Diend, and Momotaros using several other Riders as weapons, Doctor Death resumes his Eijiro guise, who seemingly forgets ever being Doctor Death to begin with.

In Kamen Rider × Kamen Rider W & Decade: Movie War 2010, the black ShinigamiHakase Memory, given to him by his longtime friend, Ryubee Sonozaki, transforms him into Super Doctor Death (スーパー死神博士, Sūpā Shinigami-hakase), though his official name is the ShinigamiHakase Dopant (死神博士・ドーパント, Shinigami-hakase Dōpanto), the leader of Super Shocker against his will due to the influence of the Gaia Memory. That is also the explanation for Eijiro becoming Doctor Death in the previous movie. He revives the Neonoid to defeat Kamen Rider Decade once and for all. However, Super Doctor Death reverts to Eijiro as the Memory ejects out of him caused by Kamen Rider W Heat Metal's HardMammother Maximum Drive and he is saved by Natsumi in her Kamen Rider Kiva-la form. Afterwards he returns to the studio with the others once Ultimate D is destroyed by Decade and W.

Eijiro Hikari and Doctor Death are portrayed by Renji Ishibashi (石橋 蓮司, Ishibashi Renji) while Ikadevil is voiced by Tomokazu Seki (関 智一, Seki Tomokazu).

==== Yusuke Onodera ====
Yusuke Onodera (小野寺 ユウスケ, Onodera Yūsuke) is a young man with a friendly but immature personality who has the power to become Kamen Rider Kuuga (仮面ライダークウガ, Kamen Raidā Kūga). Although originally from the World of Kuuga, he eventually joins up with the Hikari Studio group having rid his home world of the Gurongi.

Unlike his original counterpart, Yusuke is not shown to have access to the Rising versions of his four main forms. However, during the events of the film Kamen Rider Decade: All Riders vs. Dai-Shocker, he is forcefully transformed into Kamen Rider Kuuga Rising Ultimate (ライジングアルティメット, Raijingu Arutimetto) when High Priestess Bishium uses the Earth Stone on him. Yusuke initially lacks control of himself in this form, which is signified by having the black-colored Dark Eyes (ダークアイ, Dāku Ai), but once he breaks free of Bishium's control the eyes change to red.

While in the World of Agito, Yusuke briefly wears the Kamen Rider G3-X (仮面ライダーG3-X(ジースリーエックス), Kamen Raidā Jī Surī Ekkusu) suit. In the World of Den-O, he is possessed by Momotaros, who uses his body to become Kamen Rider Den-O (仮面ライダー電王, Kamen Raidā Den Ō).

Yusuke Onodera is portrayed by Ryouta Murai (村井 良大, Murai Ryōta).

==== Kiva-la ====
Kiva-la (キバーラ, Kibāra) is a white-colored female Kivat originally from the World of Kiva, where she is Kivat-bat the 3rd's younger sister. She is extremely tiny, small enough to be hidden in an adult's closed fist. She learns of Decade from Narutaki, and uses her power to bring Yusuke into her world, and then sends Tsukasa into another to do battle with Kaixa. She later ends up traveling with the Hikari Studio, though remaining in contact with Narutaki with only Natsumi aware of it. She seems to like Yusuke the most out of the traveling group as she is delighted when he returns to travel with them after they leave the World of Agito. In the World of Hibiki, she assists Ouja in summoning a Bakegani to be used on Decade as Gyuki was not getting the job done, placing her overall goals further into question.

In Kamen Rider × Kamen Rider W & Decade: Movie War 2010, Kiva-la is revealed to be the means for Natsumi to assume her Kamen Rider form: Kamen Rider Kiva-la.

Kiva-la is voiced by Miyuki Sawashiro (沢城 みゆき, Sawashiro Miyuki).

=== Daiki Kaito ===
Daiki Kaito (海東 大樹, Kaitō Daiki) is a mysterious young man who travels through the Kamen Riders' worlds in the hunt for their treasures as Kamen Rider Diend (仮面ライダーディエンド, Kamen Raidā Diendo), possessing the power to summon Riders to serve him. He seems to know more about Tsukasa than Tsukasa himself does, being an ally one minute and an enemy the next when it suited his thieving needs. He first reveals himself to Tsukasa during his travels to the World of Blade, and reveals that he is Diend while in the World of Faiz, following Tsukasa and the Hikari Studio ever since. Prior to the beginning of the series, Daiki had left his home world (World of Diend) for crimes he committed there, only to return when the Hikari Studio group finds its way there.

Daiki utilizes the DienDriver (ディエンドライバー, Diendoraibā) firearm, which like the Decadriver was created by Dai-Shocker, and Rider Cards to transform into Kamen Rider Diend. While transformed, he gains superhuman speed. He can also use the Kamen Ride Cards to summon up to three copies of past Kamen Riders, typically secondary and auxiliary Riders, for combat assistance.

While in the World of Agito, Daiki briefly wears the Kamen Rider G3-X suit as part of a scheme to steal the G4 Chip.

During the events of Kamen Rider × Kamen Rider × Kamen Rider The Movie: Cho-Den-O Trilogy: Episode Yellow: Treasure de End Pirates, Daiki receives a K-Touch from Reiji Kurosaki, allowing him to assume his own Complete Form that represents eight movie-exclusive villainous Kamen Riders (G4, Ryuga, Orga, Glaive, Kabuki, Caucasus, Arc, and Skull).

Daiki later returns in Kamen Rider Zi-O wielding an upgraded version of the DienDriver called the Neo DienDriver (ネオディエンドライバー, Neo Diendoraibā), which allows him to summon Riders up to those originating from Kamen Rider Build. At one point, he is forcefully transformed into Another Zi-O II (アナザージオウII, Anazā Jiō Tsū).

Daiki Kaito is portrayed by Kimito Totani (戸谷 公人, Totani Kimito).

== Recurring characters ==
=== Narutaki ===
Narutaki (鳴滝) is the central antagonist of the series, a mysterious man who refers to himself as a prophet and is able to freely travel the worlds with immunity to the convergence of the 10 worlds. He also has the ability to move freely between the worlds and summon Riders from other worlds. He firmly believes that Decade should not exist in any world, tending to say "curse you Decade!" (おのれディケイド!, Onore Dikeido!) while tricking the Riders of various worlds to kill him. Arranging a meeting with Natsumi, Narutaki proceeds to tell her that her dreams are tied to the Rider War that will awaken Decade's true nature. After Decade defied his premonitions of doom in the previous nine worlds, Narutaki decides to personally deal with him in the World of Hibiki by summoning a Bakegani, revealing to Natsumi that Tsukasa's actions are actually destroying the worlds rather than saving them as they were told, and that only she can stop the madness now. However at the World of Negatives, Narutaki expresses his joy over Decade finding himself a world which he can exist in. In the World of the Rider War, he asks for Tsukasa's help to stop Apollo Geist from speeding up the destruction of all worlds, but this doesn't change his belief that Tsukasa is the true cause of the destruction, or his desire to see Tsukasa killed.

In Kamen Rider Decade: The Last Story, Narutaki poses as Colonel Zol (ゾル大佐, Zoru Taisa), an executive member of the evil Super Shocker organization. The original Zol is the leader of Shocker's German branch and has the ability to transform into the cyborg Golden Wolf Man (黄金狼男, Ōgon Ōkami Otoko), but Narutaki as Zol does not transform in the movie. However, when Doras fell from the Super Crisis Fortress and knocks him out of his way, he reverts to Narutaki and curses Decade for causing a new calamity born from the Neonoid's antics before running off into another dimension.

Narutaki resurfaces again during the events of the crossover film Kamen Rider × Super Sentai: Super Hero Taisen as Doktor G (ドクトルG, Dokutoru Gē), a knight armored general of the newly reformed Dai-Shocker based on the real Doktor G of Destron's Germany branch. Like the original Doktor G, he wields an axe in battle and is able to assume the form of the cyborg Kani Laser (カニレーザー, Kani Rēzā). He was defeated by the card-based Kamen Riders using the Goseigers' Gosei Cards before he reverts to normal where he curses Decade again before departing into another dimension.

Narutaki appeared once again during the crossover special between Kamen Rider Gaim and Ressha Sentai ToQger. He gives Kota Kazuraba a Rainbow Pass, tells him to give the Conductor and Ticket his regards, and leaves, but not before cryptically warning him and Right about an inevitable war between Kamen Riders.

Narutaki is portrayed by Tatsuhito Okuda (奥田 達士, Okuda Tatsuhito).

=== Dai-Shocker ===
The mysterious Dai-Shocker (大ショッカー, Dai Shokkā; "Great Shocker") organization is a conglomeration of all villain organizations who set into motion a plan to take over all dimensions due to someone providing the means to do so. Based on the World of Decade, their insignia is a double-headed version of Shocker's eagle crest, but with the "DCD" written on it that hints at Decade's ties to them. In addition to Doctor Shinigami and Doktor G, there are many other members of Dai-Shocker that come from previous Kamen Rider Series. They sent their agents out across the worlds for universal domination. During the events of the crossover film Kamen Rider × Super Sentai: Super Hero Taisen, Tsukasa Kadoya reforms Dai-Shocker and becomes their Great Leader once more in order to take down the Super Sentai teams and the Dai-Zangyack group led by Captain Marvelous. However, it is revealed that it was a plot between Dai-Shocker and Dai-Zangyack all along to have the Super Sentai and the Kamen Riders wipe out each other. Both groups of villains are defeated after Tsukasa and Marvelous reveal to them that they knew about their scheme all the time, having the heroes they supposedly "destroyed" sent to an alternate dimension and summoned back all together for the final battle with them.

==== Apollo Geist ====
The first member of Dai-Shocker Tsukasa confronts, Apollo Geist (アポロガイスト, Aporo Gaisuto) is the Security Chief of Dai-Shocker, hastening the worlds' convergence to make invasion easy for his organization. He normally assumes the form of a man called Guy (ガイ, Gai) until he invokes "Apollo Change" (アポロチェンジ, Aporo Chenji). Originally from the World of X-Rider (Xライダーの世界, Ekkusu Raidā no Sekai), he was revived by the Government Of Darkness after being killed by X-Rider. However, his lifespan is short as a result and thus uses the Perfecter to take the life force out of people to augment his own. When the Perfecter is stolen from him by Diend and then destroyed by Decade, Apollo Geist eventually comes up with the plan to marry Yuki, the Fangire Queen, becoming a Fangire as a result. As a result of his transformation, he now becomes Super Apollo Geist (スーパーアポロガイスト, Sūpā Aporo Gaisuto) with the ability to remove other realities from existence. Using his power to revive the monsters from the Nine Worlds and attempting to make Natsumi his bride after Yuki is destroyed by Decade Complete Form, Super Apollo Geist fights Decade and Diend until help arrives in the form of Hibiki and Kiva. Kiva and Hibiki distract Super Apollo Geist long enough for him to be mortally wounded by Decade Complete Form with Diend's power, Geist swearing that he will "revive as the greatest nuisance in the universe" before he is destroyed. Later revived during the events of Super Hero Taisen, Apollo Geist is destroyed again by Kamen Rider Fourze in Magnet States.

Guy is portrayed by Kazuhisa Kawahara (川原 和久, Kawahara Kazuhisa). In Super Hero Taisen, Apollo Geist is voiced by Kimito Totani who portrays Daiki Kaito.

==== Llumu Qhimil ====
Ten-Faced Demon Llumu Qhimil (十面鬼ユム・キミル, Jūmenki Yumu Kimiru) is the leader of Geddon and Dai-Shocker's designated ruler of the World of Amazon, developing the mindset that Kamen Riders are the enemies of the human race, rather than Geddon. He has the GaGa Armlet and seeks Amazon's GiGi Armlet to gain their full power and use the unlimited ancient Inca powers to complete his master plan of converting humans into monsters. He normally resembles a torso attached to a large boulder, but he can also assume a humanoid form adorned with the faces of the 10 Heisei Kamen Riders from which he can access their powers and counter any of the 10 Heisei Kamen Riders' attacks. Though he gains the GiGi Armlet, he loses both it and the GaGa Armlet to the Kamen Riders with Decade Complete Form weakening him with Faiz Blaster Form before Amazon destroys him with the Super Dai Setsudan.

Llumu Qhimil is voiced by Hideo Ishikawa (石川 英郎, Ishikawa Hideo).

==== Dai-Shocker Combatmen ====
The Dai-Shocker Combatmen (大ショッカー戦闘員, Dai Shokkā Sentōin) are footsoldiers of Dai-Shocker, resembling the Shocker Combatmen and tending to scream out "Yeee" (イーッ, Ī). They are able to assume missile-like forms.

== Guest characters ==
=== Nine Worlds ===
The Nine Worlds (9つの世界, Kokonotsu no Sekai) are the A.R. Worlds that are based on the previous entries of the Kamen Rider Series that have aired during the Heisei period of Japanese history. Each differs in some way from the series on which it was based.

=== New Worlds ===
The New Worlds (新たな世界, Aratana Sekai) are the A.R. Worlds that are not based on a previous entry of the Kamen Rider Series from the Heisei period. They range from Daiki Kaito's homeworld to a crossover with Samurai Sentai Shinkenger to reimaginations of Kamen Rider Black & Kamen Rider Black RX to an alternate Kamen Rider Amazon to the World of the Rider War and Tsukasa's home A.R. World.

=== Cameo appearances ===
Various characters in Kamen Rider Decade are directly from their original Kamen Rider Series and are portrayed, or voiced, by the original actors. These characters do not appear to be affiliated with any side, as some assist Tsukasa, while others seek to fight Decade.

==== Wataru Kurenai ====
Wataru Kurenai (紅 渡, Kurenai Wataru) is the original Kamen Rider Kiva (仮面ライダーキバ, Kamen Raidā Kiba) who represents the others by giving Tsukasa his mission while they freeze Natsumi's world in place to give him time to stop its destruction. He later appears in the World of the Rider War to fight Decade after explains to him about his true goal was to destroy the Riders in the Nine Worlds.

Koji Seto (瀬戸 康史, Seto Kōji) reprises his role as Wataru Kurenai from Kamen Rider Kiva.

==== Kamen Rider Kick Hopper ====
Kamen Rider Kick Hopper (仮面ライダーキックホッパー, Kamen Raidā Kikku Hoppā), whose true identity is Sou Yaguruma (矢車 想, Yaguruma Sō), is a former member of ZECT and the first user of TheeBee Zecter to become Kamen Rider TheBee (仮面ライダーザビー, Kamen Raidā Zabī) until he went insane after the Zecter abandoned him and kicked out of ZECT for his failures. In Decade, Kick Hopper is a wild card Kamen Rider who uses a fighting style themed around kicking attacks. He and his partner Punch Hopper appear in the World of Kuuga during a dimensional distortion caused by Narutaki to fight Decade. However, when they start focusing their rage on Kuuga, Narutaki causes another dimensional distortion that sends the two to another world. Kick Hopper later appears in the World of Decade to prevent Dai-Shocker from taking over, but soon defects to the side of Dai-Shocker.

Hidenori Tokuyama (徳山 秀典, Tokuyama Hidenori) reprises his voice as Kamen Rider Kick Hopper from Kamen Rider Kabuto.

==== Kamen Rider Punch Hopper ====
Kamen Rider Punch Hopper (仮面ライダーパンチホッパー, Kamen Raidā Panchi Hoppā), whose true identity is Shun Kageyama (影山 瞬, Kageyama Shun), is a former member of ZECT and the last user of TheBee Zecter. In Decade, Punch Hopper is a wildcard Kamen Rider who uses a fighting style themed around punching attacks.

Masato Uchiyama (内山 眞人, Uchiyama Masato) reprises his voice as Kamen Rider Punch Hopper from Kamen Rider Kabuto.

==== Kamen Rider Kaixa ====
Kamen Rider Kaixa (仮面ライダーカイザ, Kamen Raidā Kaiza), whose true identity is Masato Kusaka (草加 雅人, Kusaka Masato), is the main wearer of the Kaixa Gear, a selfish, manipulative young man with an extreme hatred for all Orphnochs. In Decade, Kaixa is a wildcard Kamen Rider who attacks Decade after he is taken to another world by Kiva-la. He is under the impression that Decade is a hindrance to his own agenda and seeks to take the DecaDriver from him. He eventually concedes when Decade is returned to the World of Kiva.

Kamen Rider Kaixa reappears briefly in later airings of the series finale, using his Side Basshar to attack Decade and Wataru's group. He is seemingly killed in the chaos afterwards alongside many other Riders. In Kamen Rider Decade: The Last Story, Decade is shown to hold a Side Basshar card, labeled as a Kaixa card.

Kohei Murakami (村上 幸平, Murakami Kōhei) reprises his voice as Kamen Rider Kaixa from Kamen Rider 555.

==== Kamen Rider Ouja ====
Kamen Rider Ouja (仮面ライダー王蛇, Kamen Raidā Ōja), whose true identity is Takeshi Asakura (浅倉 威, Asakura Takeshi), is a bloodthirsty, sadistic criminal who was hand picked by Shiro Kanzaki to escalate the Rider War by killing many of its participants. In Decade, Ouja is summoned in the World of Hibiki by Kiva-la, wielding a kanabō which he uses to summon a Bakegani from the mountain side after knocking Kiva-la aside. Ouja later appears in the World of Decade to prevent Dai-Shocker from taking over, but soon defects to the side of Dai-Shocker.

Takashi Hagino (萩野 崇, Hagino Takashi) reprises his voice as Kamen Rider Ouja from Kamen Rider Ryuki.

==== Kotaro Minami ====
Kotaro Minami (南 光太郎, Minami Kōtarō) is the original Kamen Rider Black (仮面ライダーBLACK, Kamen Raidā Burakku), who was transformed into a Century King mutant cyborg by the cult Gorgom during his 19th birthday and later evolved into Kamen Rider Black RX (仮面ライダーBLACK RX, Kamen Raidā Burakku Āru Ekkusu) during his battles against alien invaders known as the Crisis Empire. In addition to his appearances as separate alternate beings in the World of Black RX and World of Black episodes, he also appears untransformed at the end of Kamen Rider Decade: All Riders vs. Dai-Shocker.

Tetsuo Kurata (倉田 てつを, Kurata Tetsuo) reprises his role as Kotaro Minami from Kamen Rider Black and Kamen Rider Black RX.

==== Shoichi Tsugami ====
Shoichi Tsugami (津上 翔一, Tsugami Shōichi), born Tetsuya Sawaki (沢木 哲也, Sawaki Tetsuya), is the original Kamen Rider Agito (仮面ライダーアギト, Kamen Raidā Agito). He appears untransformed at the end of Kamen Rider Decade: All Riders vs. Dai-Shocker along with Kotaro Minami.

Toshiki Kashu (賀集 利樹, Kashū Toshiki) has a cameo appearance reprising his role as Shoichi Tsugami from Kamen Rider Agito.

==== Kamen Rider W ====
Kamen Rider W (仮面ライダーW(ダブル), Kamen Raidā Daburu) is the duo of Detective Shotaro Hidari (左 翔太郎, Shōtarō Hidari) and his partner Philip (フィリップ, Firippu), two young private investigators from the city of Futo that fights the Dopant menace. In Kamen Rider Decade: All Riders vs. Dai-Shocker, W has a cameo appearance where he fights Shadow Moon. W also appears in Kamen Rider × Kamen Rider W & Decade: Movie War 2010|Movie War 2010 to battle Super Shocker with Decade.

Kamen Rider W is voiced by both Renn Kiriyama (桐山 漣, Kiriyama Ren; Shotaro Hidari) and Masaki Suda (菅田 将暉, Suda Masaki; Philip), making their debut in All Riders vs. Dai-Shocker in their cameo appearance ahead of their proper debut in Kamen Rider W.

==== Kazuma Kenzaki ====
Kazuma Kenzaki (剣崎 一真, Kenzaki Kazuma) is the original Kamen Rider Blade (仮面ライダーブレイド, Kamen Raidā Bureido) as well as the second Joker who appears about 5 years after the series original ending in the World of Rider War as the A.R. Worlds continue to fuse. He is first seen with Natsumi Hikari, pointing out to her that Dai-Shocker isn't the real enemy. As Natsumi asks in question, he had already left the scene. He then appears before Asumu, Wataru, Yusuke Onodera, and Daiki Kaito and says that their true enemy is Tsukasa, using them to force him to leave while he can or destroy him if he refuses. It is noteworthy that Kenzaki is able to transform directly to King Form using just the Change Beetle card alone as the belt now uses Kamen Rider Leangle's "Open Up!" feature, rather than the original "Turn Up!" feature, projecting a gold-colored version of the transformation screen that depicts the Evolution Caucasus beetle. As Kenzaki attempts to force Tsukasa to leave the world, he refuses, transforming into Kamen Rider Decade. But Tsukasa proved no match as Kenzaki overpowers him throughout the entire fight. Kenzaki then directly uses The Royal Straight Flush to finish the fight as he severely injures Tsukasa. He then assumes King Form and teams up with Wataru Kurenai and the rest of the Kamen Riders to fight Tsukasa in the Rider War.

In Kamen Rider × Kamen Rider W & Decade: Movie War 2010: Decade: The Last Story, Kenzaki in his regular form teams up with Shinji Kido, Kamen Rider Ryuki, to fight Tsukasa. But Tsukasa gains the upper hand as he transforms into Decade Violent Emotion. As he overpowers both of them, Tsukasa turns Kenzaki into the Blade Blade (ブレイドブレード, Bureido Burēdo) broadsword and kills Shinji. With Kenzaki stunned, Tsukasa finally activates his "Final Attack Ride" and kills Kenzaki as well, resulting in both Kamen Riders being turned into cards. He is later revived, as well as the rest of the Kamen Riders after Tsukasa is voluntarily destroyed. But Kenzaki mysteriously disappears as he did not take part in the final battle against Super Shocker. Instead, it would be Kazuma Kendate, Kenzaki's alternate reality version to help Tsukasa and the rest of the Kamen Riders in the battle against Super Shocker, assuming King Form with Decade's K-Touch.

Takayuki Tsubaki (椿 隆之, Tsubaki Takayuki) reprises his role as Kazuma Kenzaki from Kamen Rider Blade.

== Spin-off characters ==
=== World of Decade ===
The World of Decade (ディケイドの世界, Dikeido no Sekai) is the version of reality that is the true home of Tsukasa Kadoya. It is the primary setting of Kamen Rider Decade: All Riders vs. Dai-Shocker. The backdrop used to enter this world depicts an old mansion that is the home of the Kadoya family. This A.R. World is neither one of the Nine Worlds nor the New Worlds. This is the world where Daiki got his first treasure, the DienDriver.

==== Sayo Kadoya ====
Sayo Kadoya (門矢 小夜, Kadoya Sayo) is Tsukasa's younger sister. She is a pianist and is protected by Nobuhiko Tsukikage due to her possession of the Stone of the Earth, which is the source of Dai-Shocker's travel between the A.R. Worlds. This allows her to become High Priestess Bishium (大神官ビシュム, Daishinkan Bishumu), whom Shadow Moon manipulated to hate Tsukasa and turn Yusuke into her puppet. After realizing that she has been used, she destroys the Stone of the Earth and later makes amends with Tsukasa before he leaves.

Sayo Kadoya is portrayed by Moe Arai (荒井 萌, Arai Moe). As a child, Sayo is portrayed by Momoka Ishii (石井 萌々果, Ishii Momoka).

==== Joji Yuki ====
Joji Yuki (結城 丈二, Yūki Jōji; read as "Joji Yu-ki" in "The Next Decade" PV) is a mysterious young man with a prosthetic arm. He was a scientist who worked for Dai-Shocker and was involved in the production of the DecaDriver and the DienDriver. For unknown reasons, Yuki rebels against Dai-Shocker and is punished when the organization's leader at the time, Tsukasa Kadoya, orders the amputation of his arm. This has made him a wanted man in the World of Decade. Though he attempts to get his revenge on Tsukasa when he returns and is dethroned by Shadow Moon, Joji spares Tsukasa's life after seeing him no longer as the man he hated and encourages him to fight Dai-Shocker. He is able to remove his prosthetic arm to attach a powerful laser cannon.

The original Joji Yuki is the alter ego of Riderman (ライダーマン, Raidāman), who appears later in the All Riders vs. Dai-Shocker film. The Joji Yuki of the World of Decade does not transform into Riderman.

Joji Yuki is portrayed by musical artist Gackt, a character also portrayed in his music video for "The Next Decade". A redesigned Riderman costume was planned for the film (akin to the redesigns found in Kamen Rider The First and The Next), but was left out due to time constraints, with only the laser cannon made.

==== Nobuhiko Tsukikage ====
Nobuhiko Tsukikage (月影 ノブヒコ, Tsukikage Nobuhiko) is a butler who takes care of Sayo and convinces her to become Bishium as part of his plan take over Dai-Shocker. Through his Shadow Charger belt, Nobuhiko can transform into Shadow Moon (シャドームーン, Shadō Mūn). Once he ousts the former leader of Dai-Shocker, Tsukasa Kadoya, Nobuhiko becomes its leader as he leads the group to hunt down every Kamen Rider. In the end, though he overpowers Decade and Kuuga, Shadow Moon is defeated by W and destroyed by the All Rider Kick. While shares the same name with Nobuhiko Akizuki, the original Shadow Moon from Kamen Rider Black, his surname "Tsukikage" means "Moon Shadow".

Nobuhiko Tsukikage is portrayed by Ryuichi Oura (大浦 龍宇一, Ōura Ryūichi).

==== Ambassador Hell ====
Ambassador Hell (地獄大使, Jigoku-taishi) is an executive member of the terrorist organization Shocker, originally from the World of Kamen Rider (仮面ライダーの世界, Kamen Raidā no Sekai) and donning a new black armor. He is able to assume the form of the Inhumanoid Garagaranda (ガラガランダ), a rattlesnake monster. In the final battle, he fights Kamen Riders 1, 2, Black RX, and Kabuto. He is killed when Riders 1 and 2 use a Rider Double Kick on him after being stabbed by Kabuto and impaled by Black RX, he praises Dai-Shocker before finally succumbing to his wounds and dying in a huge explosion.

Ambassador Hell is portrayed by Ren Osugi (大杉 漣, Ōsugi Ren) while Garagaranda is voiced by Kenichi Suzumura (鈴村 健一, Suzumura Ken'ichi).

==== General Jark ====
General Jark (ジャーク将軍, Jāku-shōgun) is a supreme commander of the Crisis Empire from the World of Black RX. He is killed by Diend. Jark reappears in Super Hero Taisen as part of the new Dai-Shocker assembled by Tsukasa. After Dai-Shocker's alliance with Dai-Zangyack is revealed, Jark is once again defeated along Shadow Moon by the combined forces of Kamen Rider Black and the Maskmen.

Seizō Katō (加藤 清三, Katō Seizō) reprises his role as the voice of General Jark.

==== King Dark ====
King Dark (キングダーク, Kingu Dāku) is a giant robot and the mastermind behind the Government Of Darkness (GOD) from the World of X-Rider. He is killed by Decade Complete Form Jumbo Formation.

==== Dai-Shocker members in the World of Decade ====
Kaijin from the Shōwa Kamen Rider Series

- Shiomaneking (シオマネキング, Shiomanekingu): A monstrous fiddler crab-like member of Shocker.
- Ganikomol (ガニコウモル, Ganikōmoru): A member of Gelshocker that is the combination of a crab and a bat.
- Destron Combatmen (デストロン戦闘員, Desutoron Sentōin): The footsoldiers of Destron.
- Doras (ドラス, Dorasu): A grotesque Kamen Rider-like form that is the aspect of the Neonoid.
- Cobra Man Garai (コブラ男ガライ, Kobura Otoko Garai): An armored cobra-like monster who is the child of the Fog Mother.

Gurongi from Kamen Rider Kuuga

- Zu-Mebio-Da (ズ・メビオ・ダ, Zu Mebio Da) A leopard Gurongi.
- Me-Bajisu-Ba (メ・バヂス・バ, Me Bajisu Ba): A wasp Gurongi.
- Me-Ginoga-De (メ・ギノガ・デ, Me Ginoga De): A mushroom Gurongi.
- Go-Gadoru-Ba (ゴ・ガドル・バ, Go Gadoru Ba): A rhinoceros beetle Gurongi.

Lords from Kamen Rider Agito

- Leiurus Acutia (レイウルス・アクティア, Reiurusu Akutia): A scorpion Lord.
- Formica Pedes (フォルミカ・ペデス, Forumika Pedesu): A black carpenter ant Lord.
- Formica Regia (フォルミカ・レギア, Forumika Regia): A queen ant Lord.

Mirror Monsters from Kamen Rider Ryuki

- Sheerghost (シアゴースト, Shiagōsuto): A dragonfly larva Mirror Monster.
- Raydragoon (レイドラグーン, Reidoragūn): A dragonfly Mirror Monster.
- Psycorogue (サイコローグ, Saikorōgu): A robotic cricket Mirror Monster.

Orphnoch from Kamen Rider 555

- Butterfly Orphnoch (バタフライオルフェノク, Batafurai Orufenoku): A butterfly Orphnoch.
- Giraffe Orphnoch (ジラフオルフェノク, Jirafu Orufenoku): A giraffe Orphnoch.
- Longhorn Orphnoch (ロングホーンオルフェノク, Ronguhōn Orufenoku): A longhorn beetle Orphnoch.
- Slug Orphnoch (スラッグオルフェノク, Suraggu Orufenoku): A slug Orphnoch.
- Wild Boar Orphnoch (ワイルドボアオルフェノク, Wairudo Boa Orufenoku): A wild boar Orphnoch.
- Pelican Orphnoch (ペリカンオルフェノク, Perikan Orufenoku): A pelican Orphnoch.
- Stinkbug Orphnoch (スティンクバグオルフェノク, Sutinkubagu Orufenoku): A stinkbug Orphnoch.
- Arch Orphnoch (アークオルフェノク, Āku Orufenoku): A grasshopper Orphnoch.

Undead from Kamen Rider Blade

- Elephant Undead (エレファントアンデッド, Erefanto Andeddo): The Jack of Clubs Undead.
- Giraffa Undead (ギラファアンデッド, Girafa Andeddo): The King of Diamonds Undead.
- Darkroach (ダークローチ, Dāku Rōchi): A cockroach Undead.

Makamou from Kamen Rider Hibiki

- Kappa (カッパ): A snapping turtle/frog Makamou.
- Bakeneko (バケネコ): A cat Makamou.
- Hitotsumi (ヒトツミ): A Futakuchi-onna Makamou.

Worms from Kamen Rider Kabuto

- Coleoptera Worm Aeneus (コレオプテラワーム・アエネウス, Koreputera Wāmu Aeneusu): A scarab Worm.
- Coleoptera Worm Croceus (コレオプテラワーム・クロセウス, Koreputera Wāmu Kuroseusu): A scarab Worm.
- Coleoptera Worm Argentum (コレオプテラワーム・アージェンタム, Koreputera Wāmu Ājentamu): A scarab Worm.
- Geophilid Worm (ジオフィリドワーム, Jiofirido Wāmu): A centipede kaijin.
- Subst Worm (サブストワーム, Sabusuto Wāmu): A crayfish Worm.
- Cassis Worm Gladius (カッシスワーム・グラディウス, Kasshisu Wāmu Guradiusu): A horseshoe crab Worm.

Imagin from Kamen Rider Den-O

- Albinoleo Imagin (アルビノレオイマジン, Arubinoreo Imajin): A white lion Imagin.
- Mole Imagin (Axe Hand) (モールイマジン（アックスハンド）, Mōru Imajin (Akkusu Hando)): A mole Imagin who wields an axe.
- Mole Imagin (Drill Hand) (モールイマジン（ドリルハンド）, Mōru Imajin (Doriru Hando)): A mole Imagin who wields a drill.
- Mole Imagin (Cross Hand) (モールイマジン（クロスハンド）, Mōru Imajin (Kurosu Hando)): A mole Imagin who wields a claw.

Fangire from Kamen Rider Kiva

- Rat Fangire (ラットファンガイア, Ratto Fangaia): A rat Fangire.
- Sungazer Fangire (サンゲイザーファンガイア, Sangeizā Fangaia): A giant girdled lizard Fangire.
- Bat Fangire (バットファンガイア, Batto Fangaia): A bat Fangire.

Other Kaijin from Kamen Rider Decade

- Taurus Ballista (タウルス・バリスタ, Taurusu Barisuta): The Buffalo Lord who appeared previously in Kamen Rider Decade.

=== World of the Rider War (Movie War 2010) ===
In Kamen Rider × Kamen Rider W & Decade: Movie War 2010, the World of the Rider War takes on its true purpose and is home to the evil Super Shocker organization. The backdrop for this world now depicts the destruction of the Nine Worlds. Tsukasa is dressed in the same clothes from the first episode with a different hairstyle, but now transforms into Decade Violent Emotion. Daiki's treasure in this world is Tsukasa's rider deck.

==== Yuriko Misaki ====
Yuriko Misaki (岬 ユリコ, Misaki Yuriko) is a girl who lives in this A.R. World who meets Tsukasa during his rampage against the Kamen Riders. She follows Tsukasa, urging him along in his mission to be the destroyer of worlds. Like her namesake from Kamen Rider Stronger, Yuriko has the ability to transform into Electro-Wave Human Tackle (電波人間タックル, Denpa Ningen Takkuru). It is said that she died in a fight with Wasp Woman years in the past but due to having never found her place in the world, she still searches for it even in death. She finds her place with Tsukasa, the only one who cared for her. In the end, she sacrifices herself to mortally wound Wasp Woman with her Ultra Cyclone attack and save Natsumi from her. Now able to rest in peace having finally found her place and avenged her death, she disappears.

Yuriko Misaki is portrayed by Alice Hirose (広瀬 アリス, Hirose Arisu).

==== Super Shocker ====
The evil Super Shocker (スーパーショッカー, Sūpā Shokkā) organization is formed from the last remnants of Dai-Shocker, with the destruction of the Nine Worlds and the destruction of Dai-Shocker. In addition to the high-ranking members Super Doctor Shinigami and Colonel Zol, other villains from the Kamen Rider Series make up the ranks of Super Shocker. They utilize the Super Crisis Fortress (スーパークライス要塞, Sūpā Kuraisu Yōsai) as their base.

===== Wasp Woman =====
Wasp Woman (蜂(ハチ)女, Hachi Onna) was a bee/wasp-like cyborg who wields the Wasp Fleuret (ワスプフルーレ, Wasupu Furūre) rapier, and previously a member of Shocker in Kamen Rider, being the one who killed Tackle while a member of Dai-Shocker. She is now one of the high-ranking members of Super Shocker, going after Natsumi until she is mortality wounded by Electro-Wave Human Tackle's Ultra Cyclone. Wasp Woman releases the Neonoid to make her more powerful, only to be engulfed by it.

This iteration of Wasp Woman is portrayed by Nao Oikawa (及川 奈央, Oikawa Nao).

===== Neonoid =====
The Neonoid (ネオ生命体, Neo Seimeitai) of Kamen Rider ZO is a pool of living fluid that relies on the very container its dwells in as its life support and create a grotesque Kamen Rider-like incarnation known as Doras (ドラス, Dorasu). Its personality is extremely childish and somewhat sadistic, though it appears it doesn't realize the true nature of what its doing, referring to its attacking the Kamen Riders as 'playing'. Super Doctor Shinigami seeks to revive the Neonoid in order to destroy Kamen Rider Decade. But once revived, it is beyond Super Shocker's control as it consumes Wasp Woman and creates Doras to fight the Kamen Riders. Though Doras is destroyed by the combined finishers of the Nine World Riders' most powerful forms, the Neonoid takes control of the Super Crisis Fortress until it is destroyed. However, it survives and absorbs the Dummy Dopant to become the strongest monster Ultimate D (アルティメットD, Arutimetto Dī; The letter D stands for "Doras" and "Dummy Dopant") before quickly meeting its end through Decade and W's Triple Extreme.

The Neonoid is voiced by Yūtarō Honjō (本城 雄太郎, Honjō Yūtarō), while Doras's vocal effects are provided by Keikō Sakai (酒井 敬幸, Sakai Keikō). As Ultimate D, he is also voiced by Toru Tezuka (手塚 とおる, Tezuka Tōru).

===== Super Shocker Combatmen =====
The Super Shocker Combatmen (スーパーショッカー戦闘員, Sūpā Shokkā Sentōin) are remodeled versions of the Dai-Shocker's footsoldiers, resembling the Shocker Combatmen and tending to scream out "Yeee" (イーッ, Ī). Like the Dai-Shocker Combatmen they are also able to assume missile-like forms.

===== Other Super Shocker members =====
Kaijin from the Shōwa Kamen Rider Series

- Zanjioh (ザンジオー, Zanjiō): A salamander kaijin of Shocker.
- Jaguar Man (ジャガーマン, Jagā Man) A jaguar kaijin of Shocker.
- Poison Lizard Man (毒トカゲ男, Dokutokage Otoko): A giant girdled lizard kaijin of Shocker.
- Hilchameleon (ヒルカメレオン, Hirukamereon): A member of Gelshocker that is the combination of a leech and a chameleon.
- Cobra Man Garai (コブラ男ガライ, Kobura Otoko Garai): An armored cobra kaijin of Fog.

Kaijin from the Heisei Kamen Rider Series

- Xu-Goma-Gu (ズ・ゴオマ・グ, Zu Gōma Gu): A vampire bat Gurongi in Ultimate Form.
- Go-Jalaji-Da (ゴ・ジャラジ・ダ, Go Jaraji Da): A porcupine Gurongi.
- Volucris Falco (ウォルクリス・ファルコ, Worukurisu Faruko): A falcon Lord.
- Solospider (ソロスパイダー, Sorosupaidā): A armored tetragnatha praedonia Mirror Monster.
- Scorpion Orphnoch (スコーピオンオルフェノク, Sukōpion Orufenoku): A scorpion Orphnoch.
- Titan (ティターン, Titān): A scorpion/chameleon Undead.
- Kodama (コダマ): A tree Makamou.
- Sectio Worm Acuere (セクティオワーム・アクエレ, Sekutio Wāmu Akuere): A mantis Worm.
- Cobra Imagin (コブライマジン, Kobura Imajin): A cobra Imagin.
- Gecko Imagin (ゲッコーイマジン, Gekkō Imajin): A gecko Imagin.
- Sungazer Fangire (サンゲイザーファンガイア, Sangeizā Fangaia): A giant girdled lizard Fangire.

==== Alternate Kamen Rider Decade ====
In the director's cut of the film, Natsumi has a dream where she sees Tsukasa being attacked by an evil doppelgänger of himself which transforms into a version of Kamen Rider Decade Complete Form which has a series of Decade Complete Final Kamen Rider Cards instead of the Kamen Ride Cards of the Nine Worlds' Kamen Riders. This other Kamen Rider Decade attacks the original Tsukasa, shortly before Natsumi wakes from her dream. The scene featuring this encounter originally appeared in the teaser for the film in the television series' finale.
