= Masahiro Inoue =

Japanese actor (born 1989)

- 井上 正大
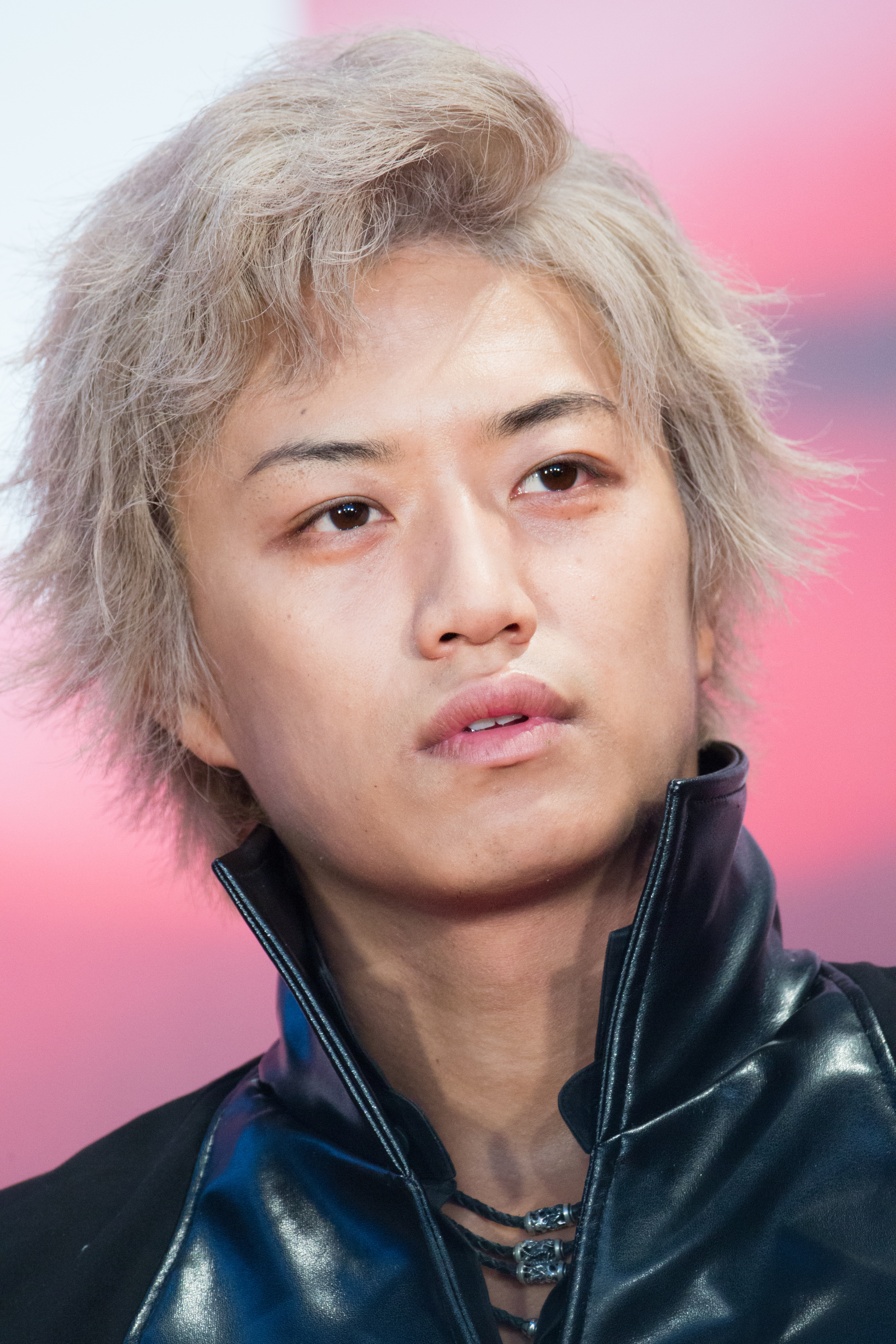
- Inoue at Opening Ceremony of the Tokyo International Film Festival, 2017.
- Born: March 20, 1989 (age 37); Midori-ku, Yokohama, Kanagawa, Japan
- Years active: 2008–present
- Spouse: Jaimie Natsuki (m. 2016; div. 2020)
- Children: 1

Masahiro Inoue (井上 正大, Inoue Masahiro; born March 20, 1989) is a Japanese actor and representative director of AIC RIGHTS. He got his start in acting portraying Keigo Atobe in Musical: The Prince of Tennis: The Imperial Presence, Hyotei as part of the Hyoutei B Cast. In 2009, he portrayed the lead role in Kamen Rider Decade, Tsukasa Kadoya, who had the ability to transform into the title character and in the music videos for Gackt's "Journey Through the Decade" and "Stay the Ride Alive" as the series' main character. He later appears in the Garo series Garo: Goldstorm Sho. In January 2023, he was appointed as the representative director of AIC RIGHTS.

== Personal life ==
Inoue is a 1st dan black belt in Taekwondo and in 2013, he was one of the protagonists of the film "Taekwondo Damashii: Rebirth", in which he plays Toshimichi Isshiki, a Taekwondo champion and the youngest son of a legendary Taekwondo grandmaster.

== Filmography ==
=== Television ===
Year	Title	Role	Notes	Ref.
2009	Kamen Rider Decade	Tsukasa Kadoya/Kamen Rider Decade	Lead role	
2009	Kamen Rider G	Kamen Rider Decade (voice)	Cameo	
2009	Samurai Sentai Shinkenger	Tsukasa Kadoya/Kamen Rider Decade	Episode 21	
2013	Kamen Rider Wizard	Tsukasa Kadoya/Kamen Rider Decade	Episodes 52 and 53	
2018–19	Kamen Rider Zi-O	Tsukasa Kadoya/Kamen Rider Decade		
2023	Kamen Rider Gotchard vs. Kamen Rider Legend	Kamen Rider Decade	Episode 2	

=== Films ===
Year	Title	Role	Notes	Ref.
2009	Cho Kamen Rider Den-O & Decade Neo Generations: The Onigashima Warship	Tsukasa Kadoya/Kamen Rider Decade		
2009	Kamen Rider Decade: All Riders vs. Dai-Shocker	Tsukasa Kadoya/Kamen Rider Decade	Lead role	
2009	Kamen Rider × Kamen Rider W & Decade: Movie War 2010	Tsukasa Kadoya/Kamen Rider Decade	Lead role	
2012	Kamen Rider × Super Sentai: Super Hero Taisen	Tsukasa Kadoya/Kamen Rider Decade	Lead role	
2014	Heisei Rider vs. Shōwa Rider: Kamen Rider Taisen feat. Super Sentai	Tsukasa Kadoya/Kamen Rider Decade		
2017	Cosmetic Wars	Shunsuke Takatō		
2018	Kamen Rider Heisei Generations Forever	Kamen Rider Decade (voice)		
2018	Garo: Fang of God	Jinga		
2024	Kamen Rider Gotchard: The Future Daybreak	Tsukasa Kadoya/Kamen Rider Decade		
2026	Mr. Hoshino Runs Again Today	Hirokazu Ito		
