= Kamen Rider Decade: All Riders vs. Dai-Shocker =

Kamen Rider Decade the Movie: All Riders vs. Dai-Shocker
- Film poster for both Kamen Rider Decade the Movie: All Riders vs. Dai-Shocker and Samurai Sentai Shinkenger The Movie: The Fateful War

Japanese name
- Kanji: 劇場版 仮面ライダーディケイド オールライダー対大ショッカー
Transcriptions
- Revised Hepburn: Gekijōban Kamen Raidā Dikeido: Ōru Raidā tai Daishokkā
- Directed by: Osamu Kaneda
- Written by: Shōji Yonemura
- Based on: Kamen Rider Decade by Shō Aikawa
- Produced by: Ishimori Productions; Toei
- Starring: Masahiro Inoue; Ryota Murai; Kanna Mori; Kimito Totani; Moe Arai; Ryuichi Oura
- Music by: Shuhei Naruse; Kōtarō Nakagawa
- Distributed by: Toei Company, Ltd
- Release date: August 8, 2009
- Running time: 66 minutes; 79 minutes (Director's Cut)
- Language: Japanese
- Box office: ¥2,148,805,950 (US$19,418,091)

Kamen Rider Decade the Movie: All Riders vs. Dai-Shocker (劇場版 仮面ライダーディケイド オールライダー対大ショッカー, Gekijōban Kamen Raidā Dikeido Ōru Raidā Tai Daishokkā; Masked Rider Decade the Movie: All Riders vs. Dai-Shocker) is a superhero film adaptation of the 2009 Kamen Rider series Kamen Rider Decade. The main protagonists of Kamen Rider W make their debut in the film.

The film was released in Japanese theaters on August 8, 2009, in a double-bill with the Samurai Sentai Shinkenger film, Samurai Sentai Shinkenger the Movie: The Fateful War. In its first week in theaters, it opened at the #1 spot, edging out Harry Potter (#2) and Pokémon (#3), earning ¥2,148,805,950 (US$19,418,091) in box office revenues as of September 2021. It is the highest grossing Kamen Rider film to date.

== Production and casting ==
As Decade is billed as the 10th anniversary series of the Heisei period run of the Kamen Rider Series, the film features all ten of the lead Heisei Kamen Riders, as well as all of the Shōwa period Kamen Riders, leading to a total of 25 Riders (with three secondary Riders and three Diend-summoned Riders). Tetsuo Kurata reprises his role as Kotaro Minami and Toshiki Kashu reprises his role as Shoichi Tsugami. New actors portraying old redesigned characters include Renji Ishibashi as Doctor Shinigami and Ren Osugi as Ambassador Hell. The film also features Moe Arai as Tsukasa's sister Sayo Kadoya and Ryuichi Oura as Nobuhiko Tsukikage, Decade's incarnation of Shadow Moon. Filming began in May 2009.

Gackt, also celebrating his 10th anniversary as a solo artist, released "The Next Decade" for the film's theme song, as he had released "Journey through the Decade" as the theme song for the television series. Gackt also appears in the film as Joji Yuki.

The film also features the debut appearances of Kamen Rider Kuuga Rising Ultimate and the 11th Heisei Kamen Rider: Kamen Rider W.

To promote the film, Ren Osugi and Renji Ishibashi appeared as their characters in Tokyo promoting themselves as members of the Dai-Shocker Party, tying in with the House of Representatives of Japan election of 2009. Also for the film, 7-Eleven stores in Japan have contests to win All Riders vs. Dai-Shocker collectibles, in addition to selling special Kamen Rider Decade merchandise with Ganbaride cards and Heisei Rider 10th Anniversary merchandise.

== Plot ==
The Hikari Studio arrives in a new A.R. World where, after seeing that Tsukasa's photos of this world are coming out perfectly, Natsumi realizes they may be in Tsukasa's home world. Tsukasa realizes he remembers the mansion depicted on the backdrop that took them here. Finding the manor, Tsukasa opens the door as he Natsumi and Yuusuke meet a girl named Sayo, who identifies Tsukasa as her older brother. As Sayo learns that Tsukasa lost his memories, revealing how he left her a year ago, her caretaker Nobuhiko Tsukikage arrives and confronts him about leaving his sister alone for so long. But when the Nine Worlds fusion starts to influence the World of Decade, Tsukikage reveals that Tsukasa's journey has now enabled a solution to the crisis by determining the strongest Kamen Rider in existence: The Rider Battle. When his memories return, Tsukasa gives Tsukikage the clearance to make it happen. Three days later, after numerous matches, it comes down to a 6-man tag team match between the team of Decade, Kuuga, and Diend vs. V3, BLACK, and Super-1. With Diend running off and Kuuga wounded, Decade is forced to defeat all three on his own. Upon victory, a castle emerges from the stadium with Yusuke and Natsumi finding themselves in the throne room surrounded by various monsters as they are welcomed to Dai-Shocker before Eijiro appears as he suddenly reveals himself to be Doctor Shinigami, toasting to their leader's return: Tsukasa. Revealing all of their actions were to ensure Dai-Shocker would achieve its goal of dominion of all the saved worlds, Tsukasa sends the horrified Natsumi and Yusuke into the sewers.

The two escape to the Kadoya mansion, learning of Tsukasa's childhood from Sayo before learning that she and Tsukikage are with Dai-Shocker as the latter becomes Shadow Moon while the former uses her Stone of the Earth on Yusuke, unleashing the greatest and most dangerous of Kuuga's powers within him. Yusuke tells Natsumi to run away before the powers are unleashed. At Dai-Shocker's castle, seeing the worlds still gathering, Tsukasa learns from Tsukikage that the Battle Fight was a farce as Sayo arrives, declaring herself High Priestess Bishium as Tsukikage reveals he outlived his purpose before dropping himself into the sewers, where he is attacked by Yusuke as Kuuga Rising Ultimate Form, under the control of Sayo. Tsukasa goes to the Hikari Studio to try to reconcile with Natsumi, who can no longer trust him for using her to achieve his ends. Tsukasa pleads with her as the Hikari Studio is now his only home, but Natsumi still refuses, as she is now alone in the world. The next day, Dai-Shocker begins its attack across the worlds starting with the World of Decade. Finding herself in the middle of it, Natsumi is saved by Narutaki into another conquered world before they run into Daiki who had disguised himself as one of the attacking Dai-Shocker Soldiers. Seeing hope in Daiki's ability to travel across worlds, Narutaki sees the only way to possibly save the worlds is to gather the Kamen Riders.

Elsewhere, with no one to turn to, Tsukasa is confronted by Jōji Yūki who attempts to get revenge on him for having lost his arm while working for Dai-Shocker. He is about to finish Tsukasa off until he realizes that Tsukasa has changed and that he is now Dai-Shocker's target. Yūki pulls off his arm, revealing its robotic replacement and allows Tsukasa to escape as he prepares his transformation into Riderman. Elsewhere, after an attempt to recruit Kamen Riders Ouja and Kick Hopper ends bad, Diend and Natsumi are attacked by a Dai-Shocker platoon under General Jark. Though he summons Raia, Gai and Punch Hopper to distract their new enemies as he flees the area with Natsumi, Diend is cornered by Jark as Tsukasa arrives, now intent on fighting Dai-Shocker and saving his friends. With Diend's help, Decade drives off the monsters as Jark is destroyed by Diend.

Making their way to Dai-Shocker's castle, Natsumi and the two Kamen Riders are confronted by the entire Dai-Shocker army led by Doctor Shinigami and Ambassador Hell as Ikadevil and Garagaranda respectively. Things seem bleak until all of the other Riders arrive to help. After Garagaranda and Ikadevil are destroyed, the Bishium-controlled Rising Ultimate Kuuga arrives to kill Decade. Attempting to get to his sister, he convinces her that she can fly like him and realize that Tsukikage is only using her to further his goals. Sayo realizes the error of her ways, and destroys the Stone of the Earth, freeing Yusuke from its control as Shadow Moon decides to finish them off himself. Before Shadow Moon could move in for the kill after defeating Decade and Kuuga, however, the unexpected arrival of Kamen Rider W tips the scales as he takes out Shadow Moon on their own before taking his leave, pinning Shadow Moon into the castle. All of the other Riders join Decade in an All Rider Kick, destroying Shadow Moon and the Dai-Shocker castle. The resulting shock awakens King Dark as Diend arrives with Kamen Rider J. Using the DecaDriver Final FormRide card, he turns Decade into the Jumbo DecaDriver which then turns J into Decade Complete Form Jumbo Formation and he destroys King Dark with a variation of the Dimension Kick, using the other Riders as giant Kamen Ride Cards. After parting ways with the Riders, and making amends with Sayo as she begins her own journey, Tsukasa begins his true journey within the Hikari Studio, his true home, where Eijiro reappears as if nothing happened.

== Characters ==
The film primarily takes place within the A.R. World that is the true home of Tsukasa Kadoya and the center of Dai-Shocker's operations, whose symbol connects Tsukasa to them. Tsukasa is reunited with his sister Sayo, who is somehow involved in Dai-Shocker as she is protected by Nobuhiko Tsukikage who can transform into Shadow Moon.

== Internet spin-off films ==
Much like with the Kamen Rider Kiva film Kamen Rider Kiva: King of the Castle in the Demon World, Kamen Rider Decade the Movie: All Riders vs. Dai-Shocker will had a series of Internet and cellphone spin-off films titled Net Edition Kamen Rider Decade: All Riders Super Spin-off (ネット版仮面ライダーディケイド オールライダー超スピンオフ, Nettoban Kamen Raidā Dikeido Ōru Raidā Sūpā Supin'ofu). Thirty of these short films are made, taking place on the World of Net (ネットの世界, Netto no Sekai), with the first aired on July 17, 2009. There were main five different formats for the web movies:

- Petition! (陳情!, Chinjō!) where topics like should Tackle count as a Kamen Rider are brought up to Toei to make it so.
- Check! (チェック!, Chekku!) to show off a Kamen Rider's suit and explanation behind the design.
- For Real! Heisei/Shōwa Rider Athletic Meet!! (ガチ!平成/昭和ライダー運動会!!, Gachi! Heisei/Shōwa Raidā Undōkai!!) sports competitions between the Kamen Riders.
- Which One! (どれだ!, Dore da!) and Quiz! (クイズ!, Kuizu!) quiz shows with Tsukasa, Natsumi, Yusuke, Daiki as contestants while Kenichi Suzumura and Narutaki are the hosts with suit actor interviews.
- Transform! (変身!, Henshin!) where Decade teaches a random person how to assume a Rider transformation pose.

== Cast ==
- Tsukasa Kadoya (門矢 士, Kadoya Tsukasa): Masahiro Inoue (井上 正大, Inoue Masahiro)
- Yusuke Onodera (小野寺 ユウスケ, Onodera Yūsuke): Ryota Murai (村井 良大, Murai Ryōta)
- Natsumi Hikari (光 夏海, Hikari Natsumi): Kanna Mori (森 カンナ, Mori Kanna)
- Daiki Kaito (海東 大樹, Kaitō Daiki): Kimito Totani (戸谷 公人, Totani Kimito)
- Sayo Kadoya (門矢 小夜, Kadoya Sayo): Moe Arai (荒井 萌, Arai Moe)
- Nobuhiko Tsukikage (月影 ノブヒコ, Tsukikage Nobuhiko): Ryuichi Oura (大浦 龍宇一, Ōura Ryūichi)
- 10-year-old Tsukasa: Riku Ichikawa (市川 理矩, Ichikawa Riku)
- 5-year-old Sayo: Momoka Ishii (石井 萌々果, Ishii Momoka)
- Joji Yuki (結城 丈二, Yūki Jōji): Gackt
- Narutaki (鳴滝): Tatsuhito Okuda (奥田 達士, Okuda Tatsuhito)
- Shoichi Tsugami (津上 翔一, Tsugami Shōichi): Toshiki Kashu (賀集 利樹, Kashū Toshiki)
- Kotaro Minami (南 光太郎, Minami Kōtarō): Tetsuo Kurata (倉田 てつを, Kurata Tetsuo)
- Ambassador Hell (地獄大使, Jigoku-taishi): Ren Osugi (大杉 漣, Ōsugi Ren)
- Eijiro Hikari/Doctor Death (光 栄次郎／死神博士, Hikari Eijirō/Shinigami-hakase): Renji Ishibashi (石橋 蓮司, Ishibashi Renji)
- Kamen Rider W (仮面ライダーW（ダブル）, Kamen Raidā Daburu; Voice): Renn Kiriyama (桐山 漣, Kiriyama Ren), Masaki Suda (菅田 将暉, Suda Masaki)
- Kamen Rider Ouja (仮面ライダー王蛇, Kamen Raidā Ōja; Voice): Takashi Hagino (萩野 崇, Hagino Takashi)
- Kamen Rider KickHopper (仮面ライダーキックホッパー, Kamen Raidā Kikku Hoppā; Voice): Hidenori Tokuyama (徳山 秀典, Tokuyama Hidenori)
- Momotaros/Kamen Rider Den-O (モモタロス／仮面ライダー電王, Momotarosu/Kamen Raidā Den'ō; Voice): Toshihiko Seki (関 俊彦, Seki Toshihiko)
- Kiva-la (キバーラ, Kibāra; Voice): Miyuki Sawashiro (沢城 みゆき, Sawashiro Miyuki)
- Kamen Rider X (仮面ライダーX, Kamen Raidā Ekkusu; Voice), Garagaranda (ガラガランダ; Voice): : Kenichi Suzumura (鈴村 健一, Suzumura Ken'ichi)
- Kamen Rider Amazon (仮面ライダーアマゾン, Kamen Raidā Amazon; Voice), Ikadevil (イカデビル, Ikadebiru; Voice): Tomokazu Seki (関 智一, Seki Tomokazu)
- General Jark (ジャーク将軍, Jāku-shōgun; Voice): Seizō Katō (加藤 清三, Katō Seizō)
- Kamen Rider 1 (仮面ライダー1号, Kamen Raidā Ichigō; Voice): Tetsu Inada (稲田 徹, Inada Tetsu)
- Kamen Rider 2 (仮面ライダー2号, Kamen Raidā Nigō; Voice): Takahiro Fujimoto (藤本 たかひろ, Fujimoto Takahiro)
- Kamen Rider V3 (仮面ライダーV3, Kamen Raidā Bui Surī; Voice): Hirofumi Tanaka (田中 大文, Tanaka Hirofumi)
- Kamen Rider Super-1 (仮面ライダースーパー1, Kamen Raidā Sūpā Wan; Voice), Kamen Rider J (仮面ライダーJ, Kamen Raidā Jei; Voice): Cota Nemoto (根本 幸多, Nemoto Kōta)
- Kamen Rider ZX (仮面ライダーZX, Kamen Raidā Zekurosu; Voice): Masahiro Yoshino (吉野 正裕, Yoshino Masahiro)
- Kamen Rider Ixa (仮面ライダーイクサ, Kamen Raidā Ikusa; Voice), Shocker Combatman (ショッカー戦闘員, Shokkā Sentōin; Voice): Yoshimasa Tanno (丹野 宜政, Tanno Yoshimasa)
- Tournament Announce, DecaDriver Voice, DienDriver Voice: Mark Okita (マーク・大喜多, Māku Ōkita)
- Gaia Memory Voice: Fumihiko Tachiki (立木 文彦, Tachiki Fumihiko)
- Voice of other Kamen Riders and other Dai-Shocker members: Katsuyuki Konishi (小西 克幸, Konishi Katsuyuki), Toru Omura (大村 亨, Ōmura Tōru), Yuuki Anai (穴井 勇輝, Anai Yūki), Toru Itakura (板倉 徹, Itakura Tōru), SATOSHI

== Theme song ==
- "The Next Decade"
  - Lyrics: Shoko Fujibayashi
  - Composition: Ryo (of defspiral)
  - Arrangement: Kōtarō Nakagawa, Ryo
  - Artist: Gackt
