= Nozomi Kawasaki =

Japanese tarento and gravure idol (born 1987)

Nozomi Kawasaki 川崎 希
- Also known as: Nozofis; Non-chan (のんちゃん)
- Born: 23 August 1987 (age 38); Kanagawa Prefecture, Japan
- Genres: J-pop
- Occupations: Singer; actress; tarento; gravure idol
- Years active: 2005–present
- Labels: Defstar Records
- Website: Official website

Nozomi Kawasaki (川崎 希, Kawasaki Nozomi; born 23 August 1987, in Kanagawa Prefecture) is a Japanese tarento and gravure idol who is a former member of the idol group AKB48 under Team A. Kawasaki is the representative director of the Anti Minns Corporation. Kawasaki's husband is tarento and model Alexander.

== As an AKB48 member ==
=== Single A-sides participated in ===
Title
"Sakura no Hanabiratachi"
"Skirt, Hirari"

=== Other songs participated in ===
Title
"Baby! Baby! Baby!"
"Ōgoe Diamond"

=== Stage units ===
Title	Song	Notes
Team A 1st Stage: Party ga Hajimaru yo	"Classmate"	2nd Unit
Team A 1st Stage: Party ga Hajimaru yo	"Hoshi no Ondo"	1st Unit
Team A 2nd Stage: Aitakatta	"Koi no Plan"	
Team A 2nd Stage: Aitakatta	"Leo no Kakumei"	
Team A 3rd Stage: Dareka no tame ni	"Rider"	
Team A 4th Stage: Tadaima Renai-chū	"Faint"	
Himawari-gumi 1st Stage: Boku no Taiyō	"Boku to Juliet to Jet Coster"	Yuko Oshima's standby
Himawari-gumi 2nd Stage: Yume o Shina seru wake ni ikanai	"Confession"	Tomomi Itano's standby
Team A 5th Stage: Renai Kinshi Jōrei	"Heart Kata Virus"	

== Publications ==
=== Videos ===
(Her works with AKB48 are excluded)

Year	Title
2008	Nozomin chu!
2009	Himitsu: Boku no Kanojo wa Onna Spy!?
2009	Big Love
2010	Anti Minss×@misty Sexy Collab! mis*dol Nozomi Kawasaki: Moto AKB48 Nozofis no Shōgeki Roshutsu!!
2010	Nozomi Kawasaki in: Wasurerarenai, ano Natsu

== Filmography ==
=== TV programmes ===
Current appearances

Title	Network	Notes
Ōsama no Brunch	TBS	"Ōsama no Desert"

Former appearances

Year	Title	Network	Notes
2008	AKB 1-ji 59 fun!	NTV	
2008	AKB 0-ji 59 fun!	NTV	
2008	AKB48 Neshin TV	Family Gekijo	
2008	Natsu Sacas' 08 Akasaka Premier Yatai-mura! Uriage No. 1 Kettei-sen!!	TBS	
2008	AKBingo!	NTV	
2009	Card Gakuen	TBS	
2010	Love kawasaki	TVK	
2010	Sengoku Nabe TV: Nantonaku Rekishi ga Manaberu Eizō	TVK	As Gō
2011	Shikaku habataku	NHK-E	As a student along with Yuta Nakano
2014	Nara Kon	NTV	Irregular appearances

=== Films ===
Year	Title
2010	Wasurerarenai, ano Natsu

=== Stage ===
Year	Title	Role
2011	Shinshun Sengoku Nabe-sai: Anmari Chika sugi chauto Kira re chau yo	Gō

=== Radio ===
Year	Title	Network
2007	AKB48 Ashita made mō chotto.	NCB
2010	Madamada Gocha maze'! Atsumare Yan Yan	MBS Radio

=== Advertisements ===
Year	Title
2008	Hanasaku Project "AKB48"

=== Internet ===
Title	Website
mis*dol Nozomi Kawasaki @misty Gravure Dai 1-dan – Dai 3-dan	@misty

== Bibliography ==
=== Photobooks ===
Year	Title
2008	AKB48 Visual Book – featuring team A
2008	Nozofis

=== Essays ===
Year	Title	ISBN
2011	"AKB48" Sotsugyō Yokujitsu ni 40 Man-en de Kigyō shimashita. Idol Shachō!	ISBN 978-4-19-863106-2
2015	Non-chan no Dameo no Aishi-kata	ISBN 978-4-8002-3647-0

=== Trading cards ===
Year	Title
2009	Nozomi Kawasaki Official Card Collection: dulce secreto
