= Alexander (actor) =

Japanese-Peruvian actor and model

- アレクサンダー
- Born: December 3, 1982 (age 43); Trujillo, Peru
- Other names: Enrique; Enrique Sakamoto; Alec
- Occupations: Actor, model
- Years active: 1999–present
- Agent: Watanabe Entertainment
- Height: 1.875 m (6 ft 2 in) (2013)
- Spouse: Nozomi Kawasaki (m. 2013)
- Children: 2

Alexander (アレクサンダー, Arekusandā; sometimes stylized as ALEXANDER, born December 3, 1982) is a Japanese-Peruvian actor and model. His old stage names were Enrique (エンリケ, Enrike) and Enrique Sakamoto (坂本 エンリケ, Sakamoto Enrike). He is nicknamed Alec (アレク, Areku). His wife is former AKB48 member Nozomi Kawasaki.

== Filmography ==
Year	Title	Role	Network	Notes
	Hey! Hey! Hey! Music Champ		Fuji TV	
2009	Kamen Rider Decade	Amazon (Daisuke Yamamoto) / Kamen Rider Amazon	TV Asahi	Episodes 28 and 29
2009	Shuzo Matsuoka no Jōnetsu Carge Nekketsu! Honki Ōen-dan		TV Asahi	
	Sanma's Karakuri-TV		TBS	
2014	5-ji ni Muchū!		Tokyo MX	
2014	High Noon TV Viking!		Fuji TV	
2015	Run for Money Tōsō-chū		Fuji TV	

=== Films ===
Year	Title	Role	Notes
2001	So Faraway	Kanata	
