= Jaimie Natsuki =

Japanese actress and tarento (born 1992)

- ジェイミー 夏樹
- Born: 6 August 1992 (age 33); Chiba Prefecture
- Occupations: Actress; tarento
- Agent: Asia Business Partners
- Spouse: Masahiro Inoue (m. 2016; div. 2020)

Jaimie Natsuki (ジェイミー 夏樹, Jeimī Natsuki; born 6 August 1992, in Chiba Prefecture) is a Japanese actress and tarento. She is formerly represented with Asia Business Partners. Her husband was actor Masahiro Inoue.

== Biography ==
In 2003, Natsuki was selected as the young Nala in the musical The Lion King of Shiki Theatre Company.

From April 2015, she made regular appearances in the Nippon TV informational programme Zip!

From October in the same year, Natsuki became the main caster of Asahi Satellite Broadcasting's news programme CNN Saturday Night.

On December 19, 2016, on her own Instagram, she announced that she is married with actor Masahiro Inoue and became pregnant with her first child.

Natsuki left her agency in 2017, and currently became a freelancer.

It was announced on Instagram on 15 May 2020 that Natsuki and Inoue have now divorced.

== Filmography ==
=== Stage ===
Year	Title	Role
2003	The Lion King	Young Nala
2013	Pretty Guardian Sailor Moon –La Reconquista–	Queen Serenity
2013	The Count of Monte Cristo	Valentine
2014	Akai Kutsu –Dream Dream–	Karen
2015	Snow White	Snow White
2015	Danganronpa 2 The Stage –Goodbye Despair–	Sonia Nevermind

=== Informational-variety programmes ===
Year	Title	Network	Ref.
2012	Osekkyō Idol: Shikaru Genji	ABC	
2015	Zip!	NTV	
2015	CNN Saturday Night	BS Asahi	

=== TV dramas ===
Year	Title	Role	Network
2005	Renai Naika 25-ji	Tomo-chan	TBS

=== Films ===
Year	Title	Role
2003	Tenshi no Kiba B.T.A.	Tsugumi

=== Advertisements ===
Year	Title
2014	Morinaga Milk Industry "Tropicoco"
2015	Unilever "Lipton Asa no Kōcha"
