= Kamen Rider Decade =

Japanese TV series

- Also known as: Masked Rider Decade; Masked Rider DCD; Kamen Rider DCD
- Genre: Tokusatsu; Action-adventure; Crossover fiction Superhero fiction Science fiction
- Created by: Shotaro Ishinomori
- Written by: Shō Aikawa; Shōji Yonemura
- Directed by: Ryuta Tasaki
- Starring: Masahiro Inoue; Kanna Mori; Ryota Murai; Kimito Totani; Tatsuhito Okuda; Renji Ishibashi
- Voices of: Miyuki Sawashiro
- Narrated by: Eiichiro Suzuki
- Theme music composer: Shuhei Naruse
- Opening theme: "Journey Through the Decade" by Gackt
- Composer: Kōtarō Nakagawa
- Country of origin: Japan
- Original language: Japanese
- No. of episodes: 31 (list of episodes)

Production
- Producers: Atsushi Kaji (TV Asahi); Kengo Motoi (TV Asahi); Shinichiro Shirakura (Toei); Naomi Takebe (Toei); Kenichi Wasano (Toei)
- Running time: 20–25 minutes
- Production companies: Toei Company; Ishimori Productions; TV Asahi Corporation; Asatsu-DK

Original release
- Network: TV Asahi
- Release: January 25 – August 30, 2009

Related
- Kamen Rider Kiva; Kamen Rider W

Kamen Rider Decade (仮面ライダーディケイド, Kamen Raidā Dikeido) is a Japanese television show and the 2009 installment of the long-running Kamen Rider series of tokusatsu dramas. As its title suggests, Decade is the 10th anniversary series of Kamen Rider's Heisei era, and the final installment of its first phase. It began broadcasting the week following Kamen Rider Kiva's finale and was featured in Super Hero Time alongside the 2009 edition of the Super Sentai series, Samurai Sentai Shinkenger. Kamen Rider Zi-O, the last Heisei era series, broadcast in 2018–2019, acts as a spiritual sequel, where both Decade and Diend play prominent roles as re-occurring side characters who are directly involved in that series's plotline.

== Production and Casting ==
The Kamen Rider Decade trademark was registered by Toei on July 29, 2008.

Masahiro Inoue, who portrayed Keigo Atobe in the Prince of Tennis musicals, was cast in the lead role for Decade as Tsukasa Kadoya/Kamen Rider Decade. Also involved were Kanna Mori as Natsumi Hikari/Kamen Rider Kiva-la, and Renji Ishibashi as Natsumi's grandfather Eijiro Hikari. Another member of the cast was Tatsuhito Okuda as the mysterious Narutaki. The world of Kamen Rider Kuuga, as well as most of the other Rider Worlds, sport several characters who have been renamed and cast with different actors. Ryota Murai was cast as Yusuke Onodera who is the series' version of Kamen Rider Kuuga. Rounding up the cast was Kimito Totani who portrayed the thief Daiki Kaito/Kamen Rider Diend.

== Synopsis ==
The story follows Tsukasa Kadoya, an amnesiac photographer in the World of Natsumi. During an attack of many different Kaijin from throughout the Heisei Kamen Rider history Tsukasa becomes Kamen Rider Decade. He then learns that he needs to save the World of Natsumi by traveling to the nine AR worlds, meaning Another Rider’s world or alternate reality worlds. He begins traveling through the worlds with his friend Natsumi and her grandfather. However, he later begins traveling with Yusuke Onodera from the World of Kuuga, Kiva-la from the World of Kiva, and Daiki Kaito from the World of Diend, who can transform into Kamen Rider Diend. While journeying through the worlds Tsukasa and his companions meet Narutaki, a man who believes Tsukasa is the destroyer of worlds. They also begin running into Dai-Shocker, an alliance of terrorist organizations from across the many worlds. Will Tsukasa and his companions save the many worlds and stop Dai-Shocker, or will Tsukasa become the prophesied destroyer of worlds?

To fit with the printing motif of the series, the main Kamen Riders of the series follow the CMYK color model: Decade is magenta, Diend is cyan, and Kuuga (Rising Ultimate Form) is black and yellow. In the Cho-Den-O Trilogy film Episode Yellow: Treasure de End Pirates, Diend is the primary character, emphasizing the yellow accents on his DienDriver and the enhanced Kamen Rider Diend card.

=== Rider War ===
The Rider War (ライダー大戦, Raidā Taisen), first revealed in Natsumi Hikari's dream, is a predestined event composed of many Kamen Riders called the Rider Army (ライダー軍, Raidā Gun), all of whom were seemingly defeated by Decade. However, Kuuga survived the initial battle, assuming Ultimate Form to confront Decade once again with the two seemingly destroying each other in the ensuing battle. As Narutaki explains to Natsumi, the dream is a predestined event in which Decade will destroy all the worlds.

== Episodes ==
Generally, episodes of Decade are titled similarly to the episodes of the series that they reference. Kamen Rider Kuuga's episodes were titled with only two kanji and episodes of Kamen Rider Kiva have a musical reference and musical notation in the title. For the World of Hibiki story arc, the episode title cards are stylized in calligraphy similar to the styles featured in Kamen Rider Hibiki. For the World of Amazon story arc, the episode title had a reference from Kamen Rider Amazon episode 3. An episode arc also features a crossover with Samurai Sentai Shinkenger.

In an interview in the March 2009 issue of Kindai Magazine, Masahiro Inoue stated that Decade was slated as having only 30 episodes. A subsequent interview in Otonafami magazine confirmed that only 30 episodes were filmed, with 31 episodes airing in total.

No.	Title	Directed by	Written by	Original release date
1	"Rider War"; Transliteration: "Raidā Taisen" (Japanese: ライダー大戦)	Ryuta Tasaki	Shō Aikawa	January 25, 2009
2	"The World of Kuuga"; Transliteration: "Kūga no Sekai" (Japanese: クウガの世界)	Ryuta Tasaki	Shō Aikawa	February 1, 2009
3	"Transcendence"; Transliteration: "Chōzetsu" (Japanese: 超絶)	Ryuta Tasaki	Shō Aikawa	February 8, 2009
4	"Second Movement ♬ Prince Kiva"; Transliteration: "Dai Ni Gakushō ♬ Kiba no Ōji" (Japanese: 第二楽章♬キバの王子)	Osamu Kaneda	Shō Aikawa	February 15, 2009
5	"The Biting King's Qualifications"; Transliteration: "Kamitsuki Ō no Shikaku" (Japanese: かみつき王の資格)	Osamu Kaneda	Shō Aikawa	February 22, 2009
6	"Battle Trial: Ryuki World"; Transliteration: "Batoru Saiban Ryūki Wārudo" (Japanese: バトル裁判・龍騎ワールド)	Takao Nagaishi	Shō Aikawa	March 1, 2009
7	"Super Trick of the Real Criminal"; Transliteration: "Chō Torikku no Shinhannin" (Japanese: 超トリックの真犯人)	Takao Nagaishi	Shō Aikawa	March 8, 2009
8	"Welcome to Blade Cafeteria"; Transliteration: "Bureido Shokudō Irasshaimase" (Japanese: ブレイド食堂いらっしゃいませ)	Hidenori Ishida	Shōji Yonemura	March 15, 2009
9	"Blade Blade"; Transliteration: "Bureido Burēdo" (Japanese: ブレイドブレード)	Hidenori Ishida	Shōji Yonemura	March 22, 2009
10	"Faiz High School's Phantom Thief"; Transliteration: "Faizu Gakuen no Kaitō" (Japanese: ファイズ学園の怪盗)	Takayuki Shibasaki	Shō Aikawa	March 29, 2009
11	"555 Faces, 1 Treasure"; Transliteration: "Faizutsu no Kao, Hitotsu no Takara" (Japanese: 555つの顔、１つの宝)	Takayuki Shibasaki	Shō Aikawa	April 5, 2009
12	"Reunion: Project Agito"; Transliteration: "Saikai Purojekuto Agito" (Japanese: 再会 プロジェクト・アギト)	Takao Nagaishi	Shō Aikawa	April 12, 2009
13	"Awakening: Tornado of Souls"; Transliteration: "Kakusei Tamashii no Torunēdo" (Japanese: 覚醒 魂のトルネード)	Takao Nagaishi	Shō Aikawa	April 19, 2009
14	"Cho-Den-O Beginning"; Transliteration: "Chō Den'ō Biginingu" (Japanese: 超・電王ビギニング)	Hidenori Ishida	Yasuko Kobayashi	April 26, 2009
15	"Here Comes Super Momotaros!"; Transliteration: "Chō Momotarosu, Sanjō!" (Japanese: 超モモタロス、参上!)	Hidenori Ishida	Yasuko Kobayashi	May 3, 2009
16	"Warning: Kabuto Running Amok"; Transliteration: "Keikoku: Kabuto Bōsōchū" (Japanese: 警告：カブト暴走中)	Naoki Tamura	Kenji Konuta	May 10, 2009
17	"The Grandma Way of Taste"; Transliteration: "Obaachan Aji no Michi" (Japanese: おばあちゃん味の道)	Naoki Tamura	Kenji Konuta	May 17, 2009
18	"Idle Hibiki"; Transliteration: "Saboru Hibiki" (Japanese: サボる響鬼)	Takayuki Shibasaki	Shōji Yonemura	May 24, 2009
19	"Ending Journey"; Transliteration: "Owaru Tabi" (Japanese: 終わる旅)	Takayuki Shibasaki	Shōji Yonemura	May 31, 2009
20	"The World of Negatives' Dark Riders"; Transliteration: "Nega Sekai no Yami Raidā" (Japanese: ネガ世界の闇ライダー)	Ryuta Tasaki	Toshiki Inoue	June 7, 2009
21	"The Walking All-Rider Album"; Transliteration: "Aruku Kanzen Raidā Zukan" (Japanese: 歩く完全ライダー図鑑)	Ryuta Tasaki	Toshiki Inoue	June 14, 2009
22	"Wanted: Diend"; Transliteration: "Diendo Shimei Tehai" (Japanese: ディエンド指名手配)	Hidenori Ishida	Toshiki Inoue	June 28, 2009
23	"End of Diend"; Transliteration: "Endo Obu Diendo" (Japanese: エンド・オブ・ディエンド)	Hidenori Ishida	Toshiki Inoue	July 5, 2009
24	"The Arrival of the Samurai Sentai"; Transliteration: "Kenzan Samurai Sentai" (Japanese: 見参侍戦隊)	Takayuki Shibasaki	Yasuko Kobayashi	July 12, 2009
25	"Heretic Rider, Go Forth!"; Transliteration: "Gedō Raidā, Mairu!" (Japanese: 外道ライダー、参る！)	Takayuki Shibasaki	Yasuko Kobayashi	July 19, 2009
26	"RX! Dai-Shocker Attack"; Transliteration: "Āru Ekkusu! Dai Shokkā Raishū" (Japanese: RX！大ショッカー来襲)	Osamu Kaneda	Shōji Yonemura	July 26, 2009
27	"Black × Black RX" (Japanese: BLACK×BLACK RX)	Osamu Kaneda	Shōji Yonemura	August 2, 2009
28	"Amazon, Friend"; Transliteration: "Amazon, Tomodachi" (Japanese: アマゾン、トモダチ)	Takao Nagaishi	Shōji Yonemura	August 9, 2009
29	"The Strong, Naked, Strong Guy"; Transliteration: "Tsuyokute Hadaka de Tsuyoi Yatsu" (Japanese: 強くてハダカで強い奴)	Takao Nagaishi	Shōji Yonemura	August 16, 2009
30	"Rider War: Prologue"; Transliteration: "Raidā Taisen Joshō" (Japanese: ライダー大戦・序章)	Hidenori Ishida	Shōji Yonemura	August 23, 2009
31 (Finale)	"The Destroyer of Worlds"; Transliteration: "Sekai no Hakaisha" (Japanese: 世界の破壊者)	Hidenori Ishida	Shōji Yonemura	August 30, 2009

== Films ==
=== The Onigashima Warship ===
Cho Kamen Rider Den-O & Decade Neo Generations the Movie: The Onigashima Warship (劇場版 超・仮面ライダー電王&ディケイド NEOジェネレーションズ 鬼ヶ島の戦艦, Gekijōban Chō Kamen Raidā Den'ō Ando Dikeido Neo Jenerēshonzu Onigashima no Senkan) was released on May 1, 2009. The film takes place between episodes 15 and 16 of Decade and primarily features the cast characters from Kamen Rider Den-O in their new media franchise, the Cho-Den-O Series.

=== All Riders vs. Dai-Shocker ===
The film Kamen Rider Decade the Movie: All Riders vs. Dai-Shocker (劇場版 仮面ライダーディケイド オールライダー対大ショッカー, Gekijōban Kamen Raidā Dikeido Ōru Raidā Tai Daishokkā) opened in Japanese theaters on August 8, 2009, double-booked with Samurai Sentai Shinkenger the Movie: The Fateful War. The film is billed as featuring twenty-six Kamen Riders: the original ten Showa Riders, Black, Black RX, Shin, ZO, J, the previous nine titular Heisei Riders, Decade, and Diend, serving as a tribute to the entire Kamen Rider franchise as a whole. It also features the first on-screen appearance of the 11th Heisei Kamen Rider: Kamen Rider W. The film provides light to Tsukasa's past and Decade's relation with the mysterious Dai-Shocker organization, whose membership is composed of the various villains and monsters that previous Kamen Riders battled with. The events of the movie take place between episodes 29 and 30.

=== Movie War 2010 ===
As part of the Kamen Rider × Kamen Rider W & Decade: Movie War 2010 (仮面ライダー×仮面ライダー W（ダブル）&ディケイド MOVIE大戦2010, Kamen Raidā × Kamen Raidā Daburu Ando Dikeido Mūbī Taisen Nisenjū) triple feature, Decade's film Kamen Rider Decade: The Last Story (仮面ライダーディケイド～完結編～, Kamen Raidā Dikeido ~Kanketsuhen~) tells the story of what happens following the television series' cliffhanger finale, and was released in Japanese theaters on December 12, 2009 (initially hinted during a post credits trailer after All Riders vs. Dai-Shocker). Kamen Rider W was also featured in the sequence. The October issue of TV-Kun also makes reference to this movie, stating that "All of the mysteries [about Decade] will be answered by the movie coming out in December!!" (すべての謎は、12月公開の映画で明らかに!!, Subete no nazo wa, jūnigatsu kōkai no eiga de akiraka ni!!). Gackt once again performed the film's theme song, "Stay the Ride Alive" that was released on January 1, 2010.

=== Super Hero Taisen ===
Kamen Rider × Super Sentai: Super Hero Taisen (仮面ライダー×スーパー戦隊 スーパーヒーロー大戦, Kamen Raidā × Sūpā Sentai Sūpā Hīrō Taisen) is a film which features a crossover between the characters of the Kamen Rider and Super Sentai Series, including the protagonists of Kamen Rider Decade and Kaizoku Sentai Gokaiger alongside the casts of Kamen Rider Fourze, Kamen Rider OOO, and Tokumei Sentai Go-Busters. Masahiro Inoue and Kimito Totani reprised their roles as Tsukasa Kadoya and Daiki Kaito, along with Tatsuhito Okuda as Narutaki and Doktor G.

=== Kamen Rider Taisen ===
Heisei Rider vs. Shōwa Rider: Kamen Rider Taisen feat. Super Sentai (平成ライダー対昭和ライダー 仮面ライダー大戦 feat.スーパー戦隊, Heisei Raidā Tai Shōwa Raidā Kamen Raidā Taisen Fīcharingu Sūpā Sentai) made its theater debut on March 29, 2014. Masahiro Inoue, playing Kamen Rider Decade, alongside many other lead actors of other series appear in the film, including Gaku Sano of Kamen Rider Gaim, Renn Kiriyama of Kamen Rider W, Kohei Murakami and Kento Handa of Kamen Rider 555, Shunya Shiraishi from Kamen Rider Wizard, Ryo Hayami of Kamen Rider X, and Hiroshi Fujioka of the original Kamen Rider. The Sentai teams' Ressha Sentai ToQger and Ryo Ryusei as Daigo Kiryu from Zyuden Sentai Kyoryuger are also in the movie. Shun Sugata playing Kamen Rider ZX from the Birth of the 10th! Kamen Riders All Together!! TV special returns, also performing as Ambassador Darkness. Itsuji Itao of Kamen Rider The First plays Ren Aoi, Kamen Rider Fifteen, a main antagonist of the film.

== Kamen Rider G ==
In addition to commemorating the 10th anniversary of the Heisei Kamen Rider Series, Kamen Rider Decade was broadcast during the 50th anniversary of TV Asahi broadcasting. In a collaboration with popular band SMAP, TV Asahi and Ishimori Productions put forward a special production for SMAP's SmaSTATION talk show titled Kamen Rider G (仮面ライダーG, Kamen Raidā Jī). It premiered on January 31, 2009.

Kamen Rider G featured several actors from previous Kamen Rider programs in cameos. Kohei Murakami of Kamen Rider 555 fame played a medical experiment subject. Mitsuru Karahashi (also from 555) and Kenji Matsuda (from Hibiki and Kiva) portrayed members of the Shade terrorist cell. Kazutoshi Yokoyama and Eitoku, two suit actors commonly used by the Kamen Rider production team portrayed security guards in the TV Asahi building. Voice actor Katsumi Shiono provides vocal effects for the Phylloxera Worm, as he often does for Kamen Rider monsters. Popular TV Asahi announcer Yoko Ooshita also makes an appearance in Kamen Rider G as herself.

The original characters for Kamen Rider G are all wine-themed. The titular character's transformation requires a bottle of wine to be inserted into a transformation belt that acts as a wine opener, and he is armed with a sword that resembles a corkscrew as well as a sommelier knife. His Rider Kick finisher is also wine-based, as it is called the Swirling Rider Kick (スワリング・ライダーキック, Suwaringu Raidā Kikku). The letter "G" in the title is taken to either meaning "Good", referring to the actor Goro Inagaki, or as an onomatopoeia of the sound of wine being poured out of a bottle (gū gugū (グ〜ググ〜)). The antagonist of the piece is a Worm called the Phylloxera Worm (フィロキセラワーム, Firokisera Wāmu); the phylloxera fly is a grapevine pest. The Phylloxera Worm would later be used as the antagonist for the Kamen Rider Kabuto episodes of Decade.

Within the small production, a terrorist organization known as Shade (シェード, Shēdo) takes over the TV Asahi studios in Tokyo. The group led by Daidō Oda (Yusuke Kamiji) demands that the Japanese government release their leader Seizan Tokugawa (Show Aikawa), who was arrested after the group's human experimentations came to light. The Shade cell is assisted by the brainwashed Goro (SMAP's Goro Inagaki), but when he sees that his girlfriend Eri Hinata (Yumiko Shaku) is amongst the hostages, he regains his memories and turns on the Shade terrorists. Oda is forced to reveal himself as the Phylloxera Worm, and reveals that several other Shade members have been converted into Worms. Goro transforms into Kamen Rider G to take on the Worms, defeating them all save for Phylloxera who is much too strong for him. Just then, Kamen Rider Decade and the other Heisei Kamen Riders appear to give Kamen Rider G the confidence he needs to destroy the Phylloxera Worm with his Swirling Rider Kick. As the Phylloxera Worm says in his last breath that the war is not over, Goro reunites with Eri before proclaiming he will protect the world from Shade's evil influence.

== Super Adventure DVD ==
The Super Adventure DVD (超アドベンチャーDVD, Chō Adobenchā Dī Bui Dī) called Kamen Rider Decade: Protect! The World of Televikun (仮面ライダーディケイド 守れ！<てれびくんの世界>, Kamen Raidā Dikeido Mamore! <Terebikun no Sekai>) is the Hyper Battle DVD for Decade. Like Kiva's DVD, it is another "Choose Your Own Adventure" style story. The viewer's choices throughout the DVD affect how Decade and Diend's fight against Dai-Shocker's Televi Bae-Kun (てれびバエくん, Terebibaekun) as well as Yusuke Onodera's completion of the Decade Bazooka weapon from a punch out sheet in the back of a Televi-Kun magazine. The events of the specials take place between episodes 29 and 30.

== World of Stronger ==
For Decade's S.I.C Hero Saga side story Masked Rider Decade: World of Stronger (MASKED RIDER DECADE ─ストロンガーの世界─, 'Masked Rider Decade -Sutorongā no Sekai-) tells of how Tsukasa and the Hikari Studio crew enter the reality in which Kamen Rider Stronger takes place and meet up with the characters within, such as the original Yuriko Misaki. The first episode was published in Hobby Japan, June 2010.

1. Delza Army! Staff Officer Steel Appears!! (デルザー軍団！鋼鉄参謀現る！！, Deruzā Gundan! Kōtetsu Sanbō Arawaru!!)
2. The Rhinoceros Beetle Riders Appear!! (カブト虫ライダー登場！！, Kabutomushi Raidā Tōjō!!)
3. Arrival! Rider Diend!! (出現！ライダーディエンド！！, Shutsugen! Raidā Diendo!!)
4. Doctor Kate's Defeat (ドクターケイトの最期, Dokutā Keito no Saigo)
5. Kabuto War (カブト大戦, Kabuto Taisen)
6. The Chaotic World! (混沌とする世界！, Konton Tosuru Sekai!)
7. The Kamen Riders vs. Great Leader Rock! (仮面ライダー対岩石大首領！, Kamen Raidā Tai Ganseki Daishuryō!)
8. Arrival! Kamen Rider Kuuga!! (出現！仮面ライダークウガ！！, Shutsugen! Kamen Raidā Kūga!!)
9. Stronger Great Reconstruction!! (ストロンガー大改造！！, Sutorongā Daikaizō!!)
10. Riders Captured! Long Live Delza!! (ライダー捕らわる！デルザー万才！！, Raidā Torawaru! Deruzā Banzai!!)
11. Tackle, the Final Embrace (タックル、最後の抱擁, Takkuru, Saigo no Hōyō)
12. Farewell! The Glorious Kamen Riders! (さようなら！栄光の仮面ライダー！, Sayōnara! Eikō no Kamen Raidā!)

== Novel ==
Novel: Kamen Rider Decade: The World of Tsukasa Kadoya ~The Garden Inside the Lens~ (小説 仮面ライダーディケイド 門矢士の世界 ～レンズの中の箱庭～, Shōsetsu Kamen Raidā Dikeido Kadoya Tsukasa no Sekai ~Renzu no Naka no Hakoniwa~), written by Aki Kanehiro and supervised by Toshiki Inoue, is part of a series of spin-off novel adaptions of the Heisei Era Kamen Riders. The novel was released on April 12, 2013.

== Cast ==
- Tsukasa Kadoya (門矢 士, Kadoya Tsukasa): Masahiro Inoue (井上 正大, Inoue Masahiro)
- Natsumi Hikari (光 夏海, Hikari Natsumi): Kanna Mori (森 カンナ, Mori Kanna)
- Yusuke Onodera (小野寺 ユウスケ, Onodera Yūsuke): Ryota Murai (村井 良大, Murai Ryōta)
- Daiki Kaito (海東 大樹, Kaitō Daiki): Kimito Totani (戸谷 公人, Totani Kimito)
- Narutaki (鳴滝): Tatsuhito Okuda (奥田 達士, Okuda Tatsuhito)
- Guy (ガイ, Gai): Kazuhisa Kawahara (川原 和久, Kawahara Kazuhisa)
- Eijiro Hikari (光 栄次郎, Hikari Eijirō): Renji Ishibashi (石橋 蓮司, Ishibashi Renji)

=== Voice cast ===
- Kiva-la (キバーラ, Kibāra): Miyuki Sawashiro (沢城 みゆき, Sawashiro Miyuki)
- DecaDriver (ディケイドライバー, Dikeidoraibā), DienDriver (ディエンドライバー, Diendoraibā), K-Touch (ケータッチ, Kētatchi): Mark Okita (マーク・大喜多, Māku Ōkita)
- Narrator: Eiichiro Suzuki (鈴木 英一郎, Suzuki Eiichirō)

=== Guest cast ===
- Wataru Kurenai (紅 渡, Kurenai Wataru; 1, 31): Kōji Seto (瀬戸 康史, Seto Kōji)
- Detective (2–3): Taro Suwa (諏訪 太朗, Suwa Tarō)
- Ai Yashiro (八代 藍, Yashiro Ai; 2–3), Toko Yashiro (八代 淘子, Yashiro Tōko; 12–13): Hiroko Sato (佐藤 寛子, Satō Hiroko)
- Kamen Rider Kick Hopper (仮面ライダーキックホッパー, Kamen Raidā Kikku Hoppā; Voice; 2–3): Hidenori Tokuyama (徳山 秀典, Tokuyama Hidenori)
- Kamen Rider Punch Hopper (仮面ライダーパンチホッパー, Kamen Raidā Panchi Hoppā; Voice; 2–3): Masato Uchiyama (内山 眞人, Uchiyama Masato)
- Wataru (ワタル; 4–5, 30-31): Arashi Fukasawa (深澤 嵐, Fukasawa Arashi)
- Kivat-bat the 3rd (キバットバットIII世, Kibattobatto Sansei; Voice; 4–5): Tomokazu Sugita (杉田 智和, Sugita Tomokazu)
- Ryo Itoya (糸矢 僚, Itoya Ryō; 4): Sohto (創斗, Sōto)
- Kamen Rider Kaixa (仮面ライダーカイザ, Kamen Raidā Kaiza; Voice; 4–5): Kōhei Murakami (村上 幸平, Murakami Kōhei)
- Shinji Tatsumi (辰巳 シンジ, Tatsumi Shinji; 6–7): Momosuke Mizutani (水谷 百輔, Mizutani Momosuke)
- Kazuma Kendate (剣立 カズマ, Kendate Kazuma; 8–9, 30): Hiroki Suzuki (鈴木 拡樹, Suzuki Hiroki)
- Takumi Ogami (尾上 タクミ, Ogami Takumi; 10–11): Syunsuke Seino (制野 峻右, Seino Shunsuke)
- Momose (百瀬; 10–11): Ryosuke Miura (三浦 涼介, Miura Ryōsuke)
- Shoichi Ashikawa (芦河 ショウイチ, Ashikawa Shōichi; 12–13): So Yamanaka (山中 聡, Yamanaka Sō)
- Naomi (ナオミ; 14–15): Rina Akiyama (秋山 莉奈, Akiyama Rina)
- Kohana (コハナ; 14–15): Tamaki Matsumoto (松元 環季, Matsumoto Tamaki)
- Owner (オーナー, Ōnā; 14–15): Kenjirō Ishimaru (石丸 謙二郎, Ishimaru Kenjirō)
- Momotaros (モモタロス, Momotarosu; Voice; 14–15, 18): Toshihiko Seki (関 俊彦, Seki Toshihiko)
- Urataros (ウラタロス, Uratarosu; Voice; 14–15): Kōji Yusa (遊佐 浩二, Yusa Kōji)
- Kintaros (キンタロス, Kintarosu; Voice; 14–15): Masaki Terasoma (てらそま まさき, Terasoma Masaki)
- Ryutaros (リュウタロス, Ryūtarosu; Voice; 14–15): Kenichi Suzumura (鈴村 健一, Suzumura Ken'ichi)
- Ryotaro Nogami (野上 良太郎, Nogami Ryōtarō; 15): Takuya Mizoguchi (溝口 琢矢, Mizoguchi Takuya)
- Kotaro Nogami (野上 幸太郎, Nogami Kōtarō; 15): Dori Sakurada (桜田 通, Sakurada Dori)
- Sieg (ジーク, Jīku; Voice; 15): Shin-ichiro Miki (三木 眞一郎, Miki Shin'ichirō)
- Souji (ソウジ, Sōji; 16–17), Sou Otogiri (弟切 ソウ, Otogiri Sō; 16, 17): Daijiro Kawaoka (川岡 大次郎, Kawaoka Daijirō)
- Mayu (マユ, Mayu; 16–17): Rio Kanno (菅野 莉央, Kanno Rio)
- Arata (アラタ, Arata; 16–17): Tetsuya Makita (牧田 哲也, Makita Tetsuya)
- Asumu (アスム; 18–19, 30-31): Kazuki Koshimizu (小清水 一揮, Koshimizu Kazuki)
- Hibiki (ヒビキ; 18–19): David Ito (デビット伊東, Debitto Itō)
- Ibuki (イブキ; 18–19): Jouji Shibue (渋江 譲二, Shibue Jōji)
- Todoroki (トドロキ; 18–19): Shingo Kawaguchi (川口 真五, Kawaguchi Shingo)
- Zanki (ザンキ; 18–19): Kenji Matsuda (松田 賢二, Matsuda Kenji)
- Akira (アキラ; 18–19): Nana Akiyama (秋山 奈々, Akiyama Nana)
- Kamen Rider Ouja (仮面ライダー王蛇, Kamen Raidā Ōja; Voice; 19): Takashi Hagino (萩野 崇, Hagino Takashi)
- Otoya Kurenai (紅 音也, Kurenai Otoya; 20–21): Kouhei Takeda (武田 航平, Takeda Kōhei)
- Junichi Kaito (海東 純一, Kaitō Jun'ichi; 22–23): Yuuki Kuroda (黒田 勇樹, Kuroda Yūki)
- Haruka Miwa (三輪 春香, Miwa Haruka; 22–23): Yoko Mitsuya (三津谷 葉子, Mitsuya Yōko)
- Shin Magaki (禍木 慎, Magaki Shin; 22–23): Takao Sugiura (杉浦 太雄, Sugiura Takao)
- Takeru Shiba (志葉 丈瑠, Shiba Takeru; 24–25): Tori Matsuzaka (松坂 桃李, Matsuzaka Tōri)
- Ryunosuke Ikenami (池波 流ノ介, Ikenami Ryūnosuke; 24–25): Hiroki Aiba (相葉 弘樹, Aiba Hiroki)
- Mako Shiraishi (白石 茉子, Shiraishi Mako; 24–25): Rin Takanashi (高梨 臨, Takanashi Rin)
- Chiaki Tani (谷 千明, Tani Chiaki; 24–25): Shogo Suzuki (鈴木 勝吾, Suzuki Shōgo)
- Kotoha Hanaori (花織 ことは, Hanaori Kotoha; 24–25): Suzuka Morita (森田 涼花, Morita Suzuka)
- Genta Umemori (梅盛 源太, Umemori Genta; 24–25): Keisuke Sohma (相馬 圭祐, Sōma Keisuke)
- Hikoma Kusakabe (日下部 彦馬, Kusakabe Hikoma; 24–25): Goro Ibuki (伊吹 吾郎, Ibuki Gorō)
- Shitari of the Bones (骨のシタリ, Hone no Shitari; Voice; 24): Chō (チョー)
- Chinomanako (チノマナコ; Voice; 24–25): Ryūzaburō Ōtomo (大友 龍三郎, Ōtomo Ryūzaburō)
- Kotaro Minami (南 光太郎, Minami Kōtarō; 26–27): Tetsuo Kurata (倉田 てつを, Kurata Tetsuo)
- Amazon (アマゾン; 28–29): Enrique Sakamoto (坂本 エンリケ, Sakamoto Enrike)
- Yuki (ユウキ, Yūki; 30): Yuria Haga (芳賀 優里亜, Haga Yuria)
- Kazuma Kenzaki (剣崎 一真, Kenzaki Kazuma; 30–31): Takayuki Tsubaki (椿 隆之, Tsubaki Takayuki)

== Songs ==
Opening theme

- "Journey Through the Decade"
  - Lyrics: Shoko Fujibayashi
  - Composition: Ryo (of defspiral)
  - Arrangement: Kōtarō Nakagawa, Ryo
  - Artist: Gackt
  - Episodes: Nine Worlds arc (first verse), New Worlds arc (second verse)
  In its first week on the Oricon Weekly Charts, "Journey Through the Decade" reached the #2 spot, having sold approximately 51,666 records in that time.

Insert themes

- "Ride the Wind"
  - Lyrics: Shoko Fujibayashi
  - Composition & Arrangement: Shuhei Naruse
  - Artist: Tsukasa Kadoya (Masahiro Inoue)
  - Episodes: 10–22, 28
  Masahiro Inoue had been recording "Ride the Wind" with Shuhei Naruse released on April 22, 2009. Prior to its appearance in the series, Inoue announced the song on his blog and that he would record it under his character's name.
- "Treasure Sniper"
  - Lyrics: Shoko Fujibayashi
  - Composition & Arrangement: Ryo
  - Artist: Daiki Kaito (Kimito Totani)
  - Episodes: 23–27, 29–31
  On June 23, 2009, Kimito Totani announced on his personal blog that he was recording a new song for Decade. The Toei blog for Decade announced its title was "Treasure Sniper". Although "Treasure Sniper" did not have a release as a single, it and its instrumental are included on the MASKED RIDER DECADE COMPLETE CD-BOX boxed set. It was later released as the B-side to the single "Climax-Action ~The Den-O History~", the theme song for the Cho-Den-O Trilogy film in which Kamen Rider Diend is the main character.

Avex Group, as part of Decade's soundtrack, released a series of albums featuring the songs of the previous nine Heisei Rider series titled the Masked Rider series Theme song Re-Product CD SONG ATTACK RIDE series. Each album features the original opening theme song, as well as a rearrangement of each by "Kamen Rider's official band" Rider Chips and by "Climax Jump" composer Shuhei Naruse. The first album, released on May 20, 2009, features "Kamen Rider Kuuga!" (仮面ライダークウガ！, Kamen Raidā Kūga!) originally performed by Masayuki Tanaka for Kamen Rider Kuuga, "Break the Chain" originally performed by Tourbillon for Kamen Rider Kiva, and "Alive A life" originally performed by Rica Matsumoto for Kamen Rider Ryuki. The second album, released on June 24, 2009, features "Round ZERO~BLADE BRAVE" originally performed by Nanase Aikawa for Kamen Rider Blade, "Justiφ's" originally performed by Issa of Da Pump for Kamen Rider 555, and "Kamen Rider AGITO" (仮面ライダーAGITO, Kamen Raidā AGITO) originally performed by Shinichi Ishihara for Kamen Rider Agito. The third album was released on July 22, 2009, and features the "Climax Jump" by AAA DEN-O form for Kamen Rider Den-O, "NEXT LEVEL" by YU-KI for Kamen Rider Kabuto, and "Shōnen yo" (少年よ) by Akira Fuse for Kamen Rider Hibiki.

Gackt performed the theme to the film Kamen Rider Decade: All Riders vs. Dai-Shocker. The song is titled "The Next Decade", and was released on August 11, 2009.
