= Stay the Ride Alive =

- CD-only version cover

Single by Gackt
- Released: January 1, 2010
- Recorded: 2009
- Genre: Pop/rock
- Length: 13:29
- Label: Avex Entertainment
- Songwriter(s): Shoko Fujibayashi (lyricist); Ryo (composer, arranger); Kōtarō Nakagawa (arranger)

Gackt singles chronology
"Setsugekka (The End of Silence)/Zan" (2009)	"Stay the Ride Alive" (2010)	"Ever" (2010)

Kamen Rider Series theme song singles chronology
"W-B-X (W-Boiled Extreme)" (2009)	"Stay the Ride Alive" (2010)	"Anything Goes!" (2010)

Alternative cover
- Two-disk (CD & DVD) version cover

Alternative cover
- Limited edition "special memorial single" Digipak cover

"Stay the Ride Alive" is the thirty-seventh single released by Japanese musical artist Gackt on January 1, 2010. The song was originally titled "Stay the Decade Alive" before being renamed "Stay the Ride Alive" in late November.

== Summary ==
Like "Journey through the Decade" and "The Next Decade", Gackt recorded this song for the Kamen Rider Decade television series. It serves as the theme song for the Kamen Rider × Kamen Rider W & Decade: Movie War 2010 films.

In addition to the CD release, a version including a DVD of the music video was also made available, along with a "special memorial single" version. This version features a Digipak with a special cover, a third disc, and a booklet describing Gackt's collaboration with the Kamen Rider Decade production.

The music video for the single features Masahiro Inoue, who plays the title character inKamen Rider Decade, and Kamen Rider Double.

The theme of "Stay the Ride Alive" is that of "Eternity" (永遠, Eien).

== CD ==
All lyrics are written by Shoko Fujibayashi; all music is composed by Ryo and arranged by Kōtarō Tanaka

No.	Title	Length
1.	"Stay the Ride Alive"	4:38
2.	"Stay the Ride Alive Classic Edit."	4:05
3.	"Stay the Ride Alive instrumental"	4:36

== DVD ==
No.	Title	Length
1.	"Stay the Ride Alive Music Film"
2.	"Stay the Ride Alive multi angle ver"

== Special memorial single ==
No.	Title	Length
1.	"Journey through the Decade Music Film"
2.	"The Next Decade Music Cinema Film"
3.	"Stay the Ride Alive Music Film ～Real Edit～"
4.	"Making of "Stay the Ride Alive""

== Charts ==
Oricon

Release	Provider(s)	Chart	Peak position	Sales total
January 1, 2010	Oricon	Weekly Singles	3	29,421
January 1, 2010	Oricon	Monthly Singles	7	34,832

Billboard Japan

Chart (2010)	Peak position
Billboard Japan Hot 100	79
