= Kimito Totani =

Japanese actor

- 戸谷 公人
- Born: May 7, 1990 (age 36); Tokyo, Japan
- Education: Horikoshi High School
- Occupations: Actor; voice actor
- Years active: 2007–2025
- Agent: Freelance (Former office Aoni Production)
- Height: 181 cm (5 ft 11 in)
- Father: Kōji Totani

Kimito Totani (戸谷 公人, Totani Kimito; born May 7, 1990) is a Japanese actor and voice actor from Tokyo. He made his acting debut in the 2007 remake of Tsubaki Sanjuro. He is currently known for his portrayal of Daiki Kaito/Kamen Rider Diend in the Kamen Rider Series Kamen Rider Decade and its films.

== Filmography ==
=== TV dramas ===
Year	Title	Role	Network	Notes
2008	Kyō wa Shibuya de Rokuji	Kimito	Fuji TV	
2008	Gokusen	Kimito Takahashi	Nippon TV	Season 3
2008	Scrap Teacher		Nippon TV	Episode 2
2009	Kamen Rider Decade	Daiki Kaito/Kamen Rider Diend	TV Asahi	
2009	Gokusen: Graduation Special '09	Kimito Takahashi	Nippon TV	
2009	Samurai Sentai Shinkenger	Daiki Kaito	TV Asahi	Episode 20
2010	Momi no Ki wa Nokotta	Tanzaburō Shiozawa	TV Asahi	
2012	Perfect Blue	Masafumi Akisue	Tokyo Broadcasting System Television	Episode 4
2013	Hogokan	Takeshi Yoshioka	TV Asahi	
2013	Woman of the Crime Lab	Katsunari Yazu	TV Asahi	Episode 7
2014	Dr. DMAT	Kōji Kubo	TBS Television	Episode 10
2015	Keishichō Sōsa Ichikachō 4	Shinsuke Kōchi	TV Asahi	
2016	AKB Love Night: Love Factory	Kenta	TV Asahi	Episode 1
2017	Five	Tōru Yamachika	Fuji TV	
2019	Kamen Rider Zi-O	Daiki Kaito/Kamen Rider Diend	TV Asahi	Episodes 28–30, 42, 43, 47–49

=== Films ===
Year	Title	Role	Notes
2007	Tsubaki Sanjuro	Hironoshin Morishima	
2009	Cho Kamen Rider Den-O & Decade Neo Generations: The Onigashima Warship	Daiki Kaito/Kamen Rider Diend	
2009	Last Operations Under the Orion	Kanji Yamashita	
2009	Kamen Rider Decade: All Riders vs. Dai-Shocker	Daiki Kaito/Kamen Rider Diend	
2009	Kamen Rider × Kamen Rider W & Decade: Movie War 2010	Daiki Kaito/Kamen Rider Diend	
2010	Kamen Rider × Kamen Rider × Kamen Rider The Movie: Cho-Den-O Trilogy	Daiki Kaito/Kamen Rider Diend	Episode Yellow: Treasure de End Pirates
2012	Train Brain Express	Nichirin	
2012	Kamen Rider × Super Sentai: Super Hero Taisen	Daiki Kaito/Kamen Rider Diend, Apollo Geist	
2012	Ima, Yari ni Yukimasu	Satoru	
2013	Work Shop	Kashiwagi	
2014	Tokyo Legends II: Distorted City of Anomalies	Shingo	
2016	No Yō na Mono no Yō na Mono		
2016	Shūkatsu		Episode 1
2018	Shūkatsu 2		Episode 1
2020	Kamen Rider Zi-O Next Time: Geiz, Majesty	Daiki Kaito/Kamen Rider Diend	

=== Anime ===
Year	Title	Role	Notes
2016	Dream Festival!	Keigo Kazama	
2017	King's Game The Animation	Yusuke Kawakami	
2018	Working Buddies!	Kameda, Polar bear	
2019	B-Project: Zecchō Emotion	Toshima	

=== CD ===
- "Treasure sniper" as Daiki Kaito, 2009
