= Toshiki Kashu =

Japanese actor (born 1979)

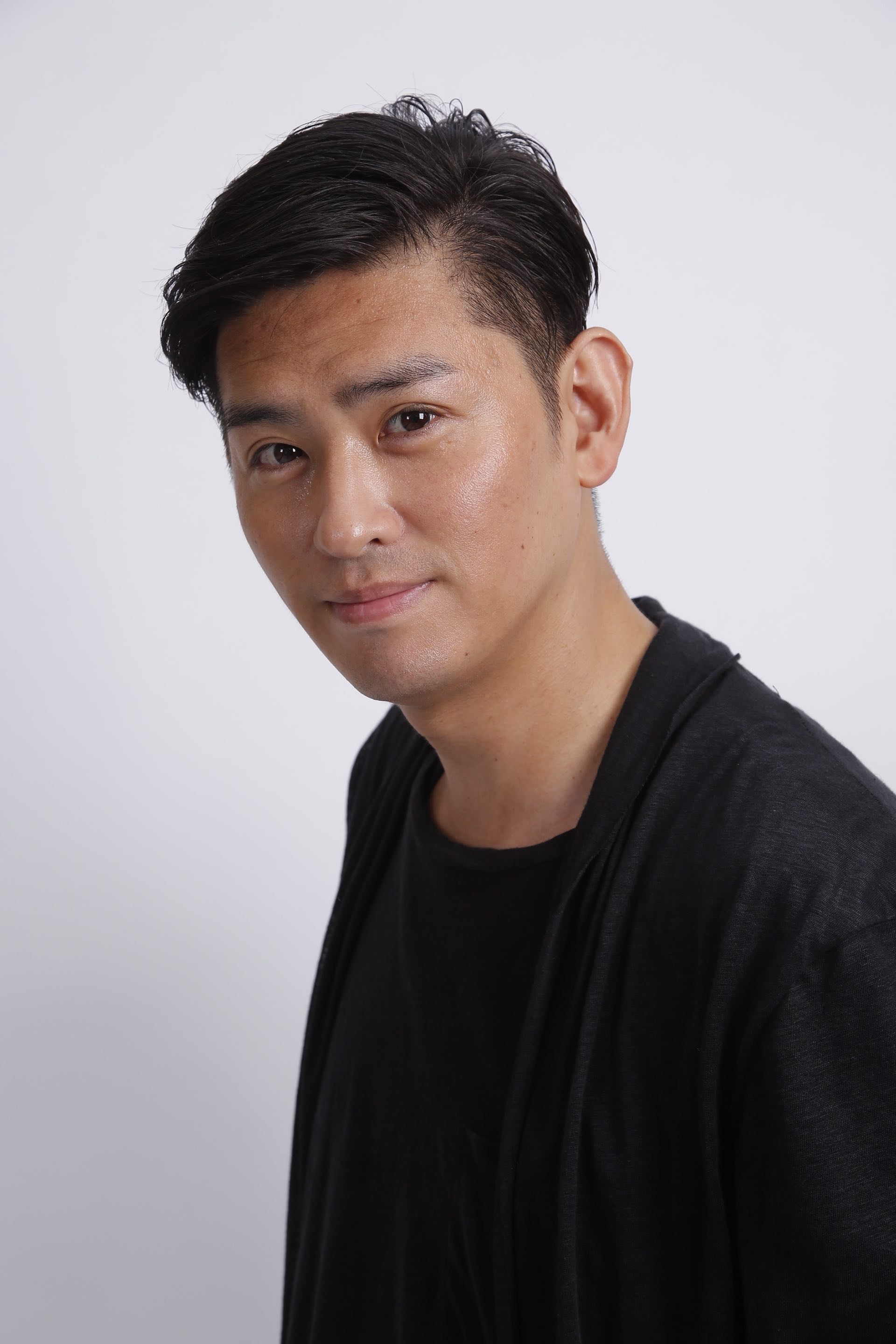
- Born: January 16, 1979 (age 47); Amagasaki, Hyōgo Prefecture, Japan
- Education: Kokugakuin University
- Occupation: Actor
- Years active: 2001 - present
- Agent: Platinum Production

Toshiki Kashu (賀集 利樹, Kashū Toshiki; born January 16, 1979) is a Japanese actor, best known for his role as Shouichi Tsugami, the main character of the Kamen Rider series Kamen Rider Agito.

== Biography ==
He graduated from the Hyōgo Prefectural Amagasaki North High School. Although he was originally a model in magazines, he showed interest in acting and was cast in the 2001 TV Asahi series Kamen Rider Agito. Kashu's role was the protagonist Shouichi Tsugami/Kamen Rider Agito, which raised his profile. In 2009, he reprised his role as Shouichi Tsugami/Kamen Rider Agito in the film Kamen Rider Decade: All Riders vs. Dai-Shocker.

His other notable role is playing Kazuya Kuroki in the first four seasons of the popular police procedural series Honcho Azumi from 2009 to 2011.

In 2009, Kashu began studying at Kokugakuin University's Faculty of Shinto culture department. and graduated in 2014.

On April 3, 2019, the day after shooting for his on-screen reprisal in Kamen Rider Zi-O, Kashu married a woman who worked for a real estate where they met at izakaya.

== Filmography ==
=== TV series ===
Year	Title	Role	Other notes	Ref.
2001	Kamen Rider Agito	Shouichi Tsugami/Kamen Rider Agito		
2005	Yoshitsune	Taira no Koremori	Taiga drama	
2024	Sugar Dog Life	Ichirō Sakuraba		

=== Films ===
Year	Title	Role	Other notes	Ref.
2001	Kamen Rider Agito: Project G4	Shouichi Tsugami		
2026	Agito: Psychic War	Shouichi Tsugami		
