= Ryota Murai =

Japanese actor

Ryouta Murai
- 村井 良大
- Born: June 29, 1988 (age 38); Tokyo, Japan
- Years active: 2006–present
- Height: 171 cm (5 ft 7 in)
- Website: Official Website

Ryouta Murai (村井 良大, Murai Ryōta) is a Japanese actor best known for his roles as Kojirō in Fūma no Kojirō, Kazuya Suzuki in Kamen Rider Den-O & Kiva: Climax Deka, Takuya Yano in Osananajimi and Yusuke Onodera in Kamen Rider Decade.

== Filmography ==
=== TV series ===
- 2007 - Fūma no Kojirō (Tokusatsu series, TV Asahi) as Kojirō
- 2009 - Kamen Rider Decade (Tokusatsu series, TV Asahi) as Kamen Rider Kuuga/Yusuke Onodera
- 2009 - Kamen Rider: Dragon Knight (Tokusatsu series, Toei Channel) voice as Albert Cho/Kamen Rider Spear
- 2014 - Kanpai Senshi After V (Tokusatsu parody sitcom), as Red
- 2022 - Invisible (TBS), as Sotaro Noma

=== Film ===
- 2008 - Kamen Rider Den-O & Kiva: Climax Deka (Movie) as Kazuya Suzuki
- 2008 - Osananajimi (Movie) as Takuya Yano
- 2009 - Kamen Rider Decade: All Riders vs. Dai-Shocker as Kamen Rider Kuuga/Yusuke Onodera
- 2009 - Kamen Rider × Kamen Rider W & Decade: Movie War 2010 as Kamen Rider Kuuga/Yusuke Onodera
- 2009 - Battle of Demons as Hibiki Horikawa
- 2016 - Sanada 10 Braves
- 2021 - Rider Time: Kamen Rider Decade VS Zi-O as Yusuke Onodera (A.R. World), Kamen Rider Kuuga/Yusuke Onodera

=== TV shows ===
==== Sengoku Nabe TV(2010-12) ====
· Kato Yoshiakira from SHICHIHON-Yari
· Miguel Chijiwa from Tenshō Kennō Shōnen Shisetsu
· Tsuda Sōgyū from Sakaishū
· Oda Nobunaga from Nobunaga and Ranmaru
· Ōishi Kuranosuke from Forty-seven rōnin
· Ōyano Yoshiemon from Amakusa Shirō and Shimabara DE midaretai
· Kobayakawa Takakage at Sengoku Support Center 3

=== Anime ===
- 2016 - Sengoku Chōjū Giga as Toyotomi Hideyoshi

=== Game ===
- 2016 - Kamen Rider: Battride War Genesis (PS4, PS3, PS Vita) as Kamen Rider Kuuga (Yusuke)
- 2019 - Kamen Rider Battle GANBARIZING (Arcade Game) as Kamen Rider Kuuga(Onodera)

=== CD ===
- "Wind and Blaze" as Kojirō, 2007
