= Kanna Mori =

Japanese actress and fashion model (born 1988)

- 森 カンナ
- Born: June 22, 1988 (age 38); Toyama Prefecture, Japan
- Other name: Kanna Moriya
- Occupation: Actress
- Years active: 2007–present
- Height: 1.68 m (5 ft 6 in)
- Spouse: Yudai Baba (m. 2021)

Kanna Mori (森 カンナ, Mori Kan'na; born June 22, 1988 in Toyama Prefecture, Japan) is a Japanese actress. She is best known as Natsumi Hikari, the female lead in the Kamen Rider Decade television series and films.

She worked under the stage name Kanna Moriya (森矢 カンナ, Moriya Kan'na) from June 2017 to June 2021.

== Early life and career ==
Although she was born in Toyama, she actually grew up in the Kansai region, having lived in Moriguchi, Osaka from age two until the fifth grade, and in Kyoto from the fifth grade until the second year of junior high school. When she moved to Tokyo due to her father's work, she began modeling for women's fashion magazines at the recommendation of a relative. Later, after gaining an interest in acting through an audition for a commercial, she was introduced to Hirata Office and began her acting career. She graduated from Tokyo Metropolitan Tamagawa High School. After appearing in films such as "Utatama", she began her full-fledged acting career in 2009, playing the heroine Hikari Natsumi in " Kamen Rider Decade ".

She won the audition for the role of a female detective partner to the lead actor, Ikki Sawamura, in the drama Tokyo Metropolitan Police Department Missing Persons Investigation Unit from among 2,298 other candidates. In June 2017, she moved from Hirata Office to Sony Music Artists and changed her stage name to Kanna Moriya.

On July 1, 2021, after her marriage to Yudai Baba, she also announced that she had left her agency, Sony Music Artists, and had changed her stage name back to her real name, Kanna Mori.

As of January 2024, she is listed as an artist affiliated with GATE, and in July of the same year, she co-starred with Shiho Kato in the MBS / TBS drama series Ayaka Is In Love with Hiroko, marking her first lead role in a television drama.

== Personal life ==
On July 1, 2021, Mori announced her marriage to Japanese basketball player Yudai Baba.

== Filmography ==
=== Television ===
- Kamen Rider Decade (2009) - Natsumi Hikari
- Samurai Sentai Shinkenger episode 21 (2009-2010) - Natsumi Hikari
- Indigo no Yoru (2010) - Tetsu/Momoko Kawamura
- Keishichō Shissōnin Sōsaka (2010) - Megumi Myōjin
- Kasonsuke no Onna Season 10 episode 10 (2010) - Nami Asaba
- The Fugitive: Plan B episode 3 (2010) - Kieko's stalker
- Keishichō Shissōnin Sōsaka Special (2011) - Megumi Myōjin
- Shitsure Hoken (2011) episode 6-7 - Yuuki Kazuki
- Nazotoki wa Dinner no Ato de episode 8 (2011) - Natsuki Miyamoto
- Beginners! episode 8 (2012) - Machiko Kosaka
- Tōkyō Zenryoku Shōjo (2012) - Haruka Kubo
- Dinner episode 5 (2013) - Minami Natsuno
- Kodomo Kenshi episode 6-10 (2013) - Arisa Arisugawa
- Mischievous Kiss: Love in Tokyo episode 6-16 (2013) - Yuko Matsumoto
- Meshibana Keiji Tachibana episode 6 (2013) - Yoyogi
- Shomuni 2013 (2013) - Misuzu Kojima
- Keishichou Sousa Ikka 9-Gakari Season 6 episode 9 (2014) - Misuzu Akimoto
- Tokyo Scarlet ~ Keishichou NS Kakari episode 6 - Rin Suzuki
- Borderline (2014) - Akemi Harada
- Tamagawa Kuyakusho Of The Dead episode 1-3 (2014) - Mayu Yamashita
- Dear Sister (2014) - Kazuko Satō
- Itazura na Kiss: Love In Tokyo 2 - Yuko Matsumoto
- Bittare!!! (2015) - Eiko Sugiyama
- Neko Zamurai Season 2 (2015) - Kikuno
- Konkatsu Deka (2015) - Yayoi Konishi
- Itsuka Tiffany de Chōshoku o (2015) - Noriko Akutsu
- Itsuka Tiffany de Chōshoku o Season 2 (2016) - Noriko Akutsu
- Omukae Desu episode 6 (2016) - Mari Uehara
- Rent-a-Rescue episode (2016) - Hirako
- Osaka Kanjousen Part 3 episode 3 (2016) - Hatomi
- Seigi no Se episode 1 - Miori Mukai
- Kaishi was Gakkou jane-n da yo (2018) - Reiko
- Iryu Sousa 5 episode 4 (2018) - Sanami Shikura
- Cheer Dan (2018) - Ichiko Matsui
- Sousa Kaigi wa Living de! episode 1 (2018) - Kanako Sakuragi
- Chuzai Keiji episode 4 (2018) - Risa Tsuyama
- Kioku Sosa - Shinjuku Higashi-sho Jiken Fairu episode 1-7 (2019) - Mori Chinatsu
- One Page Love (2019) - Risa Kawana
- Radiation House episode 1 (2019) - Yumi Kikushima
- Alibi Kuzushi episode 1 (2020) - Kasumi Nakajima
- My Ex-Boyfriend's Last Will (2022) - Asahi Haraguchi
- Ayaka Is in Love with Hiroko! (2024) - Hiroko Kanō
- A Calm Sea and Beautiful Days with You (2025) - Harue Sekiya
- Madoka 26-sai, Kenshui Yattemasu! (2025) - Uchida Manami

=== Films ===
- Utatama (2008) - Natsumi Shindō
- Cho Kamen Rider Den-O & Decade Neo Generations: The Onigashima Warship (2009) - Natsumi Hikari
- Kamen Rider Decade: All Riders vs. Dai-Shocker (2009) - Natsumi Hikari
- Kamen Rider × Kamen Rider W & Decade: Movie War 2010 (2009) - Natsumi Hikari/Kamen Rider Kiva-la
- Bread of Happiness (2012) - Kaori Saitō
- Taiyō no Suwaru Basho (2014) - Yuki Minakami
- The Next Generation: Patlabor (2015) - Rei Haibara
- Hero (2015) - Saeko Miki
- Rain Tree no Kuni (2015) - Misako
- Bittare!!! (2015) - Eiko Sugiyama
- Erased (2016) - Kayo Hinazuki
- Will You Marry My Wife? (2016) - Yoshiko Kataoka
- Your Eyes Tell (2020)
- Awake (2020) - Hiromi Yamauchi
- Every Trick in the Book (2021)
- Owari ga Hajimari (2021)
- Yudo: The Way of the Bath (2023) - Sara Yamaoka

=== Videogames ===
- Kamen Rider Battle: Ganbarizing (2019) - Kamen Rider Kiva-la (Voice)
