= Journey Through the Decade =

- The cover of the standard CD release featuring Gackt in the foreground

Single by Gackt
- Released: March 25, 2009
- Genre: Alternative rock, symphonic rock, techno
- Length: 19:15
- Label: Avex Mode
- Songwriters: Shoko Fujibayashi (lyricist); Ryo (composer, arranger); Kōtarō Nakagawa (arranger)

Gackt singles chronology
"Ghost" (2009)	"Journey Through the Decade" (2009)	"Koakuma Heaven" (2009)

Kamen Rider Series theme song singles chronology
"Break the Chain" (2008)	"Journey Through the Decade" (2009)	"The Next Decade" (2009)

Alternative cover
- The cover of the CD+DVD combo pack featuring Kamen Rider Decade in the foreground

"Journey Through the Decade" (stylized "Journey through the Decade") is a song by Japanese pop singer Gackt, serving as his thirtieth single released on March 25, 2009. It is his first song performed for Kamen Rider Decade, used as the television series' theme song.

== Summary ==
It was used as the opening theme song for the 2009 Kamen Rider Series Kamen Rider Decade. It was released as a single CD and as a CD coupled with a DVD with the music video. The theme of "Journey Through the Decade" is that it describes the "Journey" (旅, Tabi).

== CD ==
No.	Title	Length
1.	"Journey Through the Decade"	4:35
2.	"J.t.D. Re-Mix RIDE "Distort""	4:16
3.	"J.t.D. Re-Mix RIDE "Symphony""	5:52
4.	"Journey Through the Decade (Instrumental)"	4:32

== DVD ==
The music video of "Journey Through the Decade" was later released in Stay the Ride Alive, "special memorial single" version which is a Digipak with a special cover, a third disc and a booklet describing Gackt's collaboration with the Kamen Rider Decade production.

No.	Title	Length
1.	"Journey Through the Decade music video"

== Charts ==
On its first day of release, it sold 15,000 copies and weekly reached #2 with 50,000 copies sold on the Oricon Singles Chart. By the release of its follow up single "The Next Decade", "Journey Through the Decade" had sold 94,000 copies. It stayed 25 weeks on the music charts. In June 2009, the Recording Industry Association of Japan certified it as gold. In December 2012, it was certified as platinum for sales of over 250,000 copies.

Oricon

Release	Provider(s)	Chart	Peak position	Sales total
March 25, 2009	Oricon	Daily Singles	1	15,441
March 25, 2009	Oricon	Weekly Singles	2	51,666
March 25, 2009	Oricon	Monthly Singles	4	74,117
March 25, 2009	Oricon	Yearly Singles	63	97,616

Billboard Japan

Chart (2009)	Peak position
Billboard Japan Hot 100	6
