= The Next Decade =

Single by Gackt
- Released: August 11, 2009
- Genre: Hard rock, Symphonic rock
- Length: 13:44
- Label: Avex Entertainment
- Songwriters: Shoko Fujibayashi (lyricist); Ryo (composer, arranger)

Gackt singles chronology
"Flower" (2009)	"The Next Decade" (2009)	"Setsugekka (The End of Silence)/Zan" (2009)

Kamen Rider Series theme song singles chronology
"Journey Through the Decade" (2009)	"The Next Decade" (2009)	"W-B-X (W-Boiled Extreme)" (2009)

Alternative cover
- CD+DVD

"The Next Decade" is the thirty-fifth single by Japanese musical artist Gackt, released on August 11, 2009.

== Summary ==
It was used as the theme song for the Kamen Rider Series film Kamen Rider Decade: All Riders vs. Dai-Shocker in which Gackt portrays Riderman. It was released as a CD single and a CD single coupled with a DVD of the music video.

The theme of "The Next Decade" is that of the "War" (戦, Ikusa).

== CD ==
No.	Title	Length
1.	"The Next Decade"	5:03
2.	"T.N.D.Orchestra Attack Ride"	3:38
3.	"The Next Decade (Instrumental)"	5:03

== DVD ==
The music video of "The Next Decade" was later released in Stay the Ride Alive, as a "special memorial single" version which is a Digipak with a special cover, a third disc and a booklet describing Gackt's collaboration with the Kamen Rider Decade production.

1. "The Next Decade" music cinema film

== Charts ==
On its first day of release, it hit #3 on the Oricon Daily Charts after selling 13,000 copies.

Oricon

Release	Provider(s)	Chart	Peak position	Sales total
August 11, 2009	Oricon	Daily Singles	3	13,534
August 11, 2009	Oricon	Weekly Singles	4	37,033
August 11, 2009	Oricon	Monthly Singles	12	51,041
August 11, 2009	Oricon	Yearly Singles	103	56,335

Billboard Japan

Chart (2009)	Peak position
Billboard Japan Hot 100	11
