= List of Kamen Rider Kiva episodes =

This is a list of episodes of the 2008 Japanese television series Kamen Rider Kiva. Each episode title combines a word or phrase relating to music and a phrase more directly related to the episode. A symbol from musical notation is used to separate these two-halves of the episodes' titles (an exception is the finale, which uses the music end barline at the end of the title).

== Episodes ==
No.	Title	Directed by	Written by	Original release date
1	"Fate: Wake Up!"; Transliteration: "Unmei Weiku Appu!" (Japanese: 運命・ウェイクアップ！)	Ryuta Tasaki	Toshiki Inoue	27 January 2008
In 1986, at a funeral, a recently deceased man wakes up from his coffin and transforms into a monster known as a Fangire. After attacking a young woman, draining her of her Life Energy and leaving a glass-like husk behind, the newly-awakened Spider Fangire is confronted by a woman named Yuri Aso, who attempts to destroy him before he escapes. Later, at the Café mald'amour, Yuri's employer Mamoru Shima tells her to target a young businessman named Kaoru Tsugami, who actually is the Horse Fangire. She finds Tsugami as he is about to eat his sixth secretary, but he calls his bodyguards to hold her off. Though she manages to give them the slip, she is too late to save the woman as she fights the Horse Fangire. However, before the fight could go any further, she is stopped by the man she met while escaping Tsugami's bodyguards: Otoya Kurenai. This little distraction allowed Tsugami to escape. Twenty-two years later in 2008, a young man named Wataru Kurenai is gathering fish bones to create the ultimate violin varnish, attracting the attention of Yuri's daughter, Megumi Aso, who makes him realize he is not allergic to the world. Megumi soon attracts Tsugami's attention, inviting her to model for his studio as an excuse to feed on her. However, Megumi uses Tsugami's scheme to get to him to finish what her mother started. Angry for being tricked, Tsugami assumes his true form and attempts to kill Megumi until Wataru arrives, with Kivat-bat the 3rd allowing him to transform into Kamen Rider Kiva and battle the Horse Fangire. After Kiva shatters the Fangire with his Darkness Moon Break, Castle Doran emerges to devour the Horse Fangire's soul before it can escape. Once the fight ends, however, Megumi attempts to take Kiva down.
2	"Suite: Father/Son Violin"; Transliteration: "Kumikyoku Oyako no Baiorin" (Japanese: 組曲・親子のバイオリン)	Ryuta Tasaki	Toshiki Inoue	3 February 2008
In 1986, Yuri is ordered by Shima to protect a beautiful violinist named Hitomi Miyazawa, as she may be targeted by a mysterious Fangire who is attacking female violinists. To Yuri's surprise, Hitomi happens to be a student under Otoya Kurenai, learning that he is a master violinist who quit his profession for reasons unknown. After her concert performance, Hitomi disappears; in trying to find her, Yuri discovers that Hitomi is in fact the Fangire responsible for killing her "competition", just as Otoya arrives. When Yuri damages her violin, Hitomi reveals her true form as the Octopus Fangire, attacking Yuri before escaping with her broken violin. Otoya, after taking Yuri's weapon in a fake-wooing, confronts his ex-student soon after for her disrespect of the musical arts; she escapes him as well. In 2008, after countering Megumi's attempt on his life and walking away from her, Wataru returns home and fails to create the ultimate violin varnish, again, until Shizuka Nomura presents him with a violin that needs to be repaired. After reporting to Shima of Kiva's appearance and given orders not to tell "him" of the encounter, Megumi encounters Wataru again as he and Shizuka are looking for suitable wood to repair the violin. After getting Kido's permission, Wataru uses a table from the café to use as wood to finish the repairs and gives the violin back to its owner: Hitomi, who resumes her feeding starting with Megumi for her mother's acts against her in the past. After being alerted by his father's violin, the Bloody Rose, Kiva arrives and fights the Octopus Fangire. In the ensuing battle, the Fangire's violin is completely destroyed. The Octopus Fangire attempts to outrun Kiva, only to be dragged around by him on the Machine Kivaa. After Kiva defeats her, Castle Doran arrives to ingest the Octopus Fangire's soul; the camera then follows into the interior of Castle Doran, showing a trio of figures, two of whom are playing chess.
3	"Heroic: Perfect Hunter"; Transliteration: "Eiyū Pāfekuto Hantā" (Japanese: 英雄・パーフェクトハンター)	Hidenori Ishida	Toshiki Inoue	10 February 2008
In 1986, Yuri finds Otoya while he is flirting with a young lady, intent to get her weapon back from him. Suddenly, the Moth Fangire attacks Otoya until Yuri regained her weapon, forcing the Fangire to retreat. After reporting to Shima at the Café mald'amour, Yuri is told to investigate Otoya to see if he is an ideal candidate to join the Fangire Hunters. Following him, Yuri sees Otoya ruin the lives of two men, leaving them bankrupt. In 2008, after telling Shima of Kiva and reminded that he could be a bigger threat to humans than the Fangire themselves, Megumi prefers to handle Kiva herself. Later, Wataru gives Akira Kido a present for giving him the table. It is then that Wataru formally introduces himself, with Kido learning that he is the son of Otoya. Later, a female lawyer named Aya Natsukawa arrives at Wataru's home with a list of the various people that Otoya had victimized with his antics. Confused about this revelation, Wataru meets the two men whose lives Otoya had ruined, feeling devastated by the acts his father caused with Natsukawa telling him that the victims will forgive Otoya if Wataru does a good deed for them each. It is then that a German criminal takes Shizuka hostage that Wataru meets the "ally of justice" Keisuke Nago, an elite member of the Fangire Hunters. When he ponders the new information he obtained, Wataru senses the Bloody Rose's vibrations, arriving to a baseball field to find Megumi struggling against the Moth Fangire. Though he easily overpowers the Moth Fangire, Kiva is distracted by the thoughts about his father, with the Moth Fangire managing to escape him. By nightfall, Keisuke arrives to check on Megumi, realizing that Kiva has returned. Upon learning this new information, Keisuke makes it his goal to kill Kiva.
4	"Reverie: Wild Blue"; Transliteration: "Musō Wairudo Burū" (Japanese: 夢想・ワイルドブルー)	Hidenori Ishida	Toshiki Inoue	17 February 2008
In 1986, Yuri continues her investigation of Otoya, witnessing him ruin the life of another man named Yūji Tachikawa. She later presents the results of her investigation to Shima, whom he decides is not a potential Fangire Hunter. In 2008, Wataru is still saddened about his father's actions, with Shizuka unable to cheer him up as Natsukawa tells him that a redeeming act would make up for Otoya's actions, with Wataru deciding to see Keisuke and ask him to mentor him. While this occurs, Keisuke asks Shima why he was holding the information of Kiva's reappearance from him as well as request to use his Rider System to kill Kiva, but is turned down and told to get along with Megumi instead. During their meeting, Keisuke arrests Yūji Tachikawa, reduced to a swindler because of Wataru. On Keisuke's advice, Wataru helps those his father had hurt in the past much to the dismay of Megumi and Shizuka. Things get worse as the Moth Fangire resurfaces and feeds on the two men as Wataru arrives and transforms. During the battle, the Moth Fangire reveals herself to be Aya Natsukawa, who fell in love with Otoya 22 years ago and had her heart broken by him for ignoring her love for him. When Kiva is unable to fight the scornful Moth Fangire, Kivat uses a new Fuestle that summons one of the three mysterious residents of Castle Doran, Garulu, who gives Kiva a new power: Garulu Form. Now in a feral state of mind, Kiva overpowers the Moth Fangire, shattering her with his Garulu Howling Smash so Castle Doran can devour her soul. Later, Wataru plays the violin with a desire to truly understand his father, feeling Otoya's melody in his heart.
5	"Duet: Stalker Panic"; Transliteration: "Nijūsō Sutōkā Panikku" (Japanese: 二重奏・ストーカーパニック)	Kenzo Maihara	Toshiki Inoue	24 February 2008
In 1986, Otoya stalks Yuri, following her to Café mald'amour, attempting to woo her until a mysterious man, Jiro, tosses him out before having coffee. The next day, Otoya arrives at the café as Yuri comes out, intent on fighting Jiro as they duke it out in a fist fight with Yuri leaving in a huff. By the time they stop fighting, Yuri is captured by the Spider Fangire. In 2008, after using egg shells in another varnish experiment, Wataru tries to hold a mini-concert and play his violin to his neighbors so he can stop being a recluse. However, it ends horribly with Wataru's nervousness effecting his playing, scaring everyone away. Needing to build up his confidence, Wataru finds Keisuke, who is using his position as Megumi's bodyguard, much to her annoyance, to find Kiva. Hearing Wataru's pleas, Keisuke accepts, having Wataru follow Megumi in his stead. When he starts to follow Megumi, Wataru meets another man named Noboru, an obsessive fan who lies that Keisuke also gave him orders to follow her. Following her to the Make R modeling studio, Noboru has Wataru enter Megumi's dressing room and go into her purse just as Megumi finds him. At the Café, Megumi gives Keisuke a piece of her mind as Wataru learns the truth behind Noboru. The next day, Megumi is later encountered by Noboru, who asks for Megumi's autograph and then her, revealing himself as the Sheep Fangire. Following her at the time, Wataru becomes Kiva and battles the Sheep Fangire, countering the Fangire's speed in Garulu Form, with Megumi offering her aid. Before the fight could progress any further, Keisuke arrives and was about to fight Kiva when the Sheep Fangire escapes with Megumi in his grasp.
6	"Replay: Humans Are All Music"; Transliteration: "Ripurei Ningen wa Minna Ongaku" (Japanese: リプレイ・人間はみんな音楽)	Kenzo Maihara	Toshiki Inoue	2 March 2008
In 1986, Ryo Itoya, the Spider Fangire, abducts Yuri, taking her to a fun house to have her as his bride after giving her a makeover. Otoya meets Shima, who reveals himself as head of the Aozora, a group dedicated to defeating the Fangire Race, offering Otoya a position in the Fangire Hunters in return for Yuri's safety. Jiro offers his aid to Otoya, using his accurate sense of smell to point Otoya to the amusement park Yuri is being held captive. However, Otoya ends up being captured himself with Yuri losing her pendant as Ryo presents the dress she would be wearing for the wedding, where he would take her soul. Otoya manages to break free in time to interrupt the ceremony, but is soundly defeated by the Spider Fangire. However, Jiro arrives and battles the Spider Fangire, revealing himself to be Garulu of the Wolfen Race, who forces the Fangire to retreat. In 2008, Wataru blames himself for Megumi being kidnapped by the Sheep Fangire, saddened after learning of Keisuke's hatred for Kiva. Thanks to a love-sick Noboru revealing her whereabouts, Wataru arrives to the very same fun house that Yuri was brought to 22 years ago. The kidnapping was planned by Ryo himself, who thinks Megumi is her daughter. Infuriated at Noboru's treachery, the Spider Fangire drives him away before binding Wataru he pleas for Megumi's freedom. Fortunately, Megumi found her mother's pendant and uses it to break herself and Wataru free, but at the last second, the Sheep Fangire arrives to drive Ryo away so he can have her to himself. After breaking free, Wataru follows the sound of Megumi's music and transforms into Kiva to battles the Sheep Fangire, but he is still overpowered by the Fangire's speed and strength. Kivat summons another of Castle Doran's residents, the child-like Basshaa, who allows Kiva to assume Basshaa Form and have an advantage, ending with the Sheep Fangire's soul devoured by Castle Doran. Later, at the Kasel University Hospital, Wataru plays his violin for Megumi without messing up, adapting the same ideology as his father of "humans' music".
7	"Hymn: Three Star Full Course of Darkness"; Transliteration: "Sanka Mitsuboshi Yami no Furu Kōsu" (Japanese: 讃歌・三ツ星闇のフルコース)	Ryuta Tasaki	Toshiki Inoue	9 March 2008
In 1986, after attempting to know Jiro, Yuri receives orders from Shima to investigate mysterious disappearances of regulars customers of the Café mald'amour, believing it to be a Fangire's doing. To help her, Shima allows Otoya to assist her, giving the young man another chance to join Aozora if he helps. After Otoya tells Shima that Jiro helped him saving Yuri from Ryo, Shima offers Jiro a place in Aozora as well. Though he promises to catch the culprit, Jiro turns out to be responsible for the attacks. Meanwhile, the Count Inukai, the Prawn Fangire, grows fearful for his brethren dying and decides to do something about it.. In 2008, after seeing Megumi as she checks out of the hospital after the previous battle, Wataru finds Keisuke visiting her as he tells her to stay in bed, which offends her. Later, Shima sends the two to investigate the Maison Cercueil owned by Count Inukai. While searching for flower petals for his violin varnish, Megumi calls Wataru for a date and to use him as a cover to investigate the Maison Cercueil in secret. However, Keisuke uses Wataru to take a job at the restaurant as a waiter, much to Megumi's dismay. Later that night, after telling Keisuke that nothing seems odd with the restaurant, Wataru decides to question Keisuke's reasons for wanting to kill Kiva, though Keisuke tells him to trust him. The next day, Megumi follows the couple who attended the restaurant yesterday as they are attacked by Inukai as he reveals his true form and devours their souls. After Megumi loses consciousness fighting the Prawn Fangire, Wataru transforms and battles him in Garulu Form. Though Kiva has the upper hand, Keisuke's interference allows the Prawn Fangire to retreat as Kiva runs off rather than fight back at Keisuke. Meanwhile, Inukai returns to his base, gathering the life energy he needs to revive the remains of his Fangire servants.
8	"Soul: The Angered Dragon Castle"; Transliteration: "Sōru Doragon-jō, Ikaru" (Japanese: ソウル・ドラゴン城、怒る)	Ryuta Tasaki	Toshiki Inoue	16 March 2008
In 1986, after Shima briefs Jiro on the latest victim, Yuri is assigned to follow Jiro in case he is attacked. However, Otoya's blundering interference allows Jiro to run off and feed on another victim. Seeing a link between the attacks, Otoya drinks as much coffee as humanly possible to test his theory and to also impress Yuri. While on her way home that night, Yuri confronts Basshaa of the Merman Race, believing him to be responsible for the attacks. When Basshaa was able to beat her, Jiro arrives and tells Basshaa not to harm the girl as the Merman questions Jiro's reasons while assuming his human form: Ramon. Soon after, Jiro encounters Yuri as she thanks him for saving her life with feelings of love. In 2008, Megumi is a bit upset of Wataru trusting Keisuke, revealing that he drove his father to suicide. When he asks of this truth, Keisuke reveals what really happened between him and his father. Later, after getting fired for stealing a bit of Inukai's strange sauce for varnish, Wataru and Megumi decide to go the Maison Cercueil in disguise, though Shizuka sneaks Wataru away to be his date instead. Once at the restaurant, Inukai reveals his scheme and true form as Megumi arrives to cover Wataru and Shizuka's escape. Once getting Shizuka to safety, Wataru becomes Kiva as Megumi is thrown into the water, easily overpowering the Prawn Fangire. The Prawn Fangire is then forced to sacrifice his soul, augmented with the Life Energy he collected, to recreate his Fangire servants, causing the reborn monsters' souls to merge into a giant aura-based Fangire known as a Sabbat. Kiva then summons Castle Doran and Shoo Doran to battle the Sabbat, allowing Kiva to destroy it for Castle Doran and Shoo Doran to devour the scattered souls.
9	"Symphony: Ixa, Fist On"; Transliteration: "Kōkyō Ikusa, Fisuto On" (Japanese: 交響・イクサ・フィストオン)	Hidenori Ishida	Toshiki Inoue	23 March 2008
In 1986, for saving Yuri's life a second time, Shima makes Jiro an official Fangire Hunter much to Otoya's dismay. The next day, Shima tells Otoya of a mysterious killer targeting violinists playing the Black Star violin that may be a Fangire. He assigns Yuri and Jiro to get the violin at an auction, finding Otoya attempting to get the Black Star himself until Jiro knocks him out so Yuri can bid for it. After winning the auction at a much higher price than she expected to pay for it, Yuri horribly plays the Black Star to Otoya's dismay. Yuri faces the mysterious killer, the Frog Fangire, who wants his violin back as Jiro arrives. During the fight, Otoya witnesses Jiro assume his true form as Garulu, who engages in battle with the Frog Fangire. After the Fangire escapes, Ramon chides Jiro for choosing to live alongside humans, arriving with another mysterious man: Riki. But the two soon understand Jiro's intent—to use humans to get revenge on the Fangires. In 2008, after another failed attempt to create the ultimate violin like his father's Bloody Rose, Wataru seeks help from a violin expert named Takeo Ōmura whom Shizuka brings with her, hoping he would help out Wataru. Though Wataru refuses his help at first, he becomes Ōmura's student after being advised to make a violin in his own image. But while learning from Ōmura, Wataru sees something off with Ōmura after he runs off in agony when Shizuka accidentally drops a tea set. The strangeness increases when Ōmura attacks a rock band in a fit of rage, with Keisuke forcing him into his true form: the Frog Fangire. When Kiva Basshaa Form bests the Frog Fangire, Wataru is shocked that the Fangire is Ōmura. But after running off in shock, Ōmura encounters Keisuke, who transforms into another Kamen Rider using the Ixa System and overpowers the Frog Fangire.
10	"Sabre Dance: Glassy Melody"; Transliteration: "Tsurugi no Mai Garasu no Merodi" (Japanese: 剣の舞・硝子のメロディ)	Hidenori Ishida	Toshiki Inoue	30 March 2008
In 1986, after learning that Jiro is not human, Otoya tries to tells Yuri, though she does not believe him. Later, Yuri confronts Ōmura as he was about to attack her to regain the Black Star with Otoya attempting to protect her. However, once Jiro arrives, the Frog Fangire escapes and Otoya steals the Black Star to have Ōmura follows him. After talking and listen to his music, Ōmura sees Otoya as a true successor to the Black Star, but Otoya does not accept it. Later, Ōmura encounters Jiro and Yuri, who thrash him around until Otoya intervenes to Jiro's dismay, allowing Ōmura to escape so he can dispose of the Black Star in a nearby lake and start fresh. In 2008, Keisuke almost kills the Frog Fangire when Wataru intervenes, losing Keisuke's respect for saving Ōmura. Later at Wataru's place, Ōmura reveals the events of 22 years ago, revealing his promise to Otoya that would never feed on humans again. Unfortunately, Ōmura later enters another berserk phase as Keisuke arrogantly provokes him even further. Reluctantly, Wataru arrives and tries to restrain the maddened Frog Fangire until he is forced to use the Darkness Moon Break. Deliberately missing him, the astonished Frog Fangire returns to his senses as he runs off in shame. Unfortunately, Keisuke tracks him down and mercilessly attacks him. By the time Wataru arrives, Ōmura gives him final words of encouragement before he dies on the lake, his shattered remains reunited with the Black Star below.
11	"Rolling Stone: Door of Dreams"; Transliteration: "Rōringu Sutōn Yume no Tobira" (Japanese: ローリングストーン・夢の扉)	Kenzo Maihara	Toshiki Inoue	6 April 2008
In 1986, Yuri is visiting the grave site of her mother Akane when Shima arrives to tell her that Ixa System, which Akane created, is completed. Yuri pleads to use it so she can finally avenge her mother, who was murdered by a Fangire with a rook tattoo on his hand two years prior. Yuri's intent is intensified while she saves a young woman from the Earwig Fangire, only to be manhandled by him. Later, Yuri is accompanied by Otoya as they are ambushed by the Earwig Fangire in a garage, with Otoya knocked unconscious. But at the last second, Ixa arrives and destroys the Earwig Fangire as Yuri is confused to see Ixa to be Jiro. In 2008, Megumi visits Yuri's grave as Shima comforts her before she walks off. Meanwhile, pondering on what kind of violin he can make, Wataru meets a young guitarist named Kengo Eritate, whose music catches Wataru's attention. Kengo allows Wataru to borrow his bass guitar to learn how to play, as Kengo intends to draft Wataru into his new band "Ikemens" with Shizuka joining as the drummer. Later, at the café, Wataru apologizes to Keisuke, who asks Wataru to help him find Kiva to earn his forgiveness. Later, while jogging with Megumi, Keisuke encounters Ryo who is stalking Megumi, fighting the Spider Fangire as Ixa. When Wataru arrives as Kiva to fight the Spider Fangire, he gets a nasty surprise when Ixa finally makes his move, wounding Kiva as he falls into the river.
12	"First Live: Golden Speed"; Transliteration: "Hatsu Raibu Ōgon no Supīdo" (Japanese: 初ライブ・黄金のスピード)	Kenzo Maihara	Toshiki Inoue	13 April 2008
In 1986, Yuri demands to know why Shima chooses Jiro to become Ixa's user, reminding him that the Ixa System is all she has left of her mother. But Shima, though he sympathizes, explains that Ixa is for all humanity and not a tool for one person's revenge. After Jiro states that he will keep the Ixa System, a maddened Yuri runs off in a huff with thoughts of quitting the Organization. Later, she finds Otoya and goes on a date with him, running him ragged before he leaves out of not liking Yuri's new attitude. Intent to get the Yuri he loves back, Otoya begs the Ixa from Jiro before Yuri arrives to beg for the Ixa System herself. After hearing Yuri's reasons, Jiro refuses to give Ixa to her as he collapses to Yuri and Otoya's shock. Once at the hospital, Shima reveals that Jiro's condition is the result of the Ixa prototype's flaws. Though still weak from the strain, Jiro pleads Yuri to aid him, intent on destroying the Fangire Race until the Ixa suit is perfected enough for Yuri herself to use. In 2008, after being injured in his fight against Ixa, Wataru washes up on shore where Ryo, the Spider Fangire, happens to be at. Ryo tries to kill Kiva while he was unconscious, but runs off in fright when Kiva starts to move before he loses consciousness. During this time, Keisuke reports his success at defeating Kiva to Shima, as well as suggest to recruit more Fangire Hunters to aid them. With his elbow wounded from the fight, Wataru is unable to play bass for Kengo. Kengo is curious about the injury until Keisuke arrives and notices a bruise on Wataru's shoulder, bandaging it before scolding Kengo for his loud music. However, Keisuke's bad mood worsens when he encounters Ryo, who reveals that Kiva still lives. Ryo then goes after Megumi again, managing to attract Kiva's attention. Once Kiva arrives to fight the Spider Fangire, Keisuke becomes Ixa and joins the fray with the Spider Fangire running away. Though still injured, Kiva uses the Buroon Fuestle to summon Buroon, who combines with the Machine Kivaa to create Buroon Booster and battles Ixa along the highway. After being defeated by Kiva, Keisuke become mentally unstable. Later, with Megumi taking his place as the bass player, Wataru is made the lead singer of IKEMENS as he sings "Destiny's Play."
13	"Unfinished: Daddy Fight"; Transliteration: "Mikansei Dadi Faito" (Japanese: 未完成・ダディ・ファイト)	Naoki Tamura	Toshiki Inoue	20 April 2008
In 1986, after visiting Ramon and Riki to discuss their current issues as the last members of their respective kinds, Jiro tells them not to compare himself to them as he vows to restore the Wolfen Race to its former glory and rule the world. The next day, he is about to attack a young lady for nourishment when Otoya interferes, provoking Jiro to beat him to a bloody pulp before he witnesses Garulu devour the woman. Jiro laughs Otoya's insults off and reveals himself as the last of the Wolfen and his plans to make Yuri his mate to repopulate the world with his kind, infuriating Otoya. Otoya is nearly strangled by Jiro but reveals he had secretly lifted the Ixa Knuckle that Jiro dropped in the earlier beating. Transforming into Ixa in front of the shocked and angry Wolfen, Otoya vows that he will never let Jiro near Yuri again as he calmly beats a fighting-mad Garulu into submission; launching the Ixa Knuckle's Broken Fang attack at him. In 2008, after his defeat by Kiva, Keisuke becomes mentally disturbed to the point of brutally taking out his rage on a criminal named Yayoi Matsuda, and ends up being arrested himself. Meanwhile, after the IKEMENS band practice, Wataru visits Kengo's home to understand his dream to be a rock star. No sooner does Wataru leave, he encounters Tohru Miyake, a talent agent who witnessed the practice and offers Wataru a professional debut, only to be turned down and suggests Kengo to Miyake's annoyance. The next day, Kengo visits Wataru's place, though unimpressed with Wataru's dream until he is moved by him playing the Bloody Rose. Later, as he ponders his future, Kengo encounters Miyake who offers Kengo the big break he has been looking for, providing Kengo with some needed funding. However, it turns out that Miyake is actually the Rhinoceros Fangire who enjoys feeding on young humans who are working towards their dreams. When Miyake feeds on one of his victims, Wataru arrives and becomes Kiva to fight him. However, the Rhinoceros Fangire proves to be too strong for even Kiva's Basshaa Form to take on as he leaves after giving Kiva a beating.
14	"Pomp and Circumstance: Thunderstrike Purple Eye"; Transliteration: "Ifūdōdō Raigeki Pāpuru Ai" (Japanese: 威風堂々・雷撃パープルアイ)	Naoki Tamura	Toshiki Inoue	27 April 2008
In 1986, using the stolen Ixa Knuckle to fight Jiro, Otoya calmly beats a fighting-mad Garulu into submission; driving the Wolfen away with the Broken Fang attack before experiencing the Ixa System's painful side effects. Learning that he took the Ixa Knuckle, Yuri attempts to take it back from Otoya. In spite of the painful strains, Otoya intends to keep it instead of Jiro by putting up a tough front in of Yuri. Seeing her and Otoya while attending the massage parlor, Ramon finally understands Jiro's plan as he asks the Merman for a favor. Later, when Otoya runs off into the woods so Yuri cannot see him in pain, Jiro arrives to take it back and offers a painless death. But Otoya refuses with intent to kill him instead as he and Jiro resume their fight to the death. But before Otoya can land the deathblow, Basshaa arrives to aid Garulu before Otoya finally collapses from the Ixa System's strain, with Garulu intent on taking advantage of Otoya's predicament. In 2008, Wataru aids Kengo in his part time job as a construction worker to provide the funding needed to launch Kengo's rock career. However, Megumi tells Wataru to quit this back-breaking job after learning that the people Miyake had been scouting have mysteriously disappeared, suggesting that he may be a Fangire. Though he pleads Kengo leave Miyake, Wataru only makes Kengo think he is jealous of his upcoming success and tells Wataru to leave. Deciding to take matters in his own hands, Wataru follows Miyake to his lair, finding the Dream Graveyard that is composed of pictures and items of his past victims, with Kengo to be Miyake's latest victim. Assuming his true form, Miyake beats Wataru to a bloody pulp until Kivat arrives. Vowing to make Miyake pay for his methods, Wataru becomes Kiva and fights the Rhinoceros Fangire, protecting Kengo from him. But when he is unable to handle the Fangire's brute strength, Kiva enlists the aid of his final Arms Monster, Dogga. Once he assumes Dogga Form, Kiva manages to overpower the Rhinoceros Fangire before destroying him so Castle Doran can feed on the Fangire's soul. While this all occurs, after bailing Keisuke from jail, Shima takes him to the site of Ixa's latest weapon: the Powered Ixer—a dinosaur-styled hovercraft vehicle.
15	"Resurrection: Checkmate Four"; Transliteration: "Fukkatsu Chekkumeito Fō" (Japanese: 復活・チェックメイトフォー)	Takao Nagaishi	Toshiki Inoue	4 May 2008
In 1986, when Otoya is rendered unconscious from the Ixa System's strain, Garulu is about to kill him when Yuri runs in, resuming his guise while claiming that Otoya may have been attacked by a Fangire before taking the Ixa Knuckle back. While Yuri stays with Otoya at the hospital to understand how he could use the Ixa System for that long with suffering its side effects, enduring his advances on her, Jiro thanks Ramon for his aid. But when Ramon and Riki tell him to get them involved because of their endangered status, Jiro thinks back to his Race's slaughter and his intent to kill the one responsible: the mysterious the Rook of the Checkmate Four, the elite branch of the Fangire Race. Jiro gets his chance when the Rook arrived to the city, feeding during his Time Play hunt for people in pink. When he starts a new Time Play to go after Lottery winners, he encounters Yuri, recognizing him as the one who murdered her mother. Seeking vengeance, Yuri attacks him, provoking him as he knocked her unconscious as Jiro arrives. Recognizing each other, Jiro assumes his true form to battle the Rook when he becomes the Lion Fangire. However, Garulu is powerless against the stronger monster, being forced to use the Ixa System to attempt to turn the tables. In 2008, Wataru and Shizuka encounter a childish man who is drowning in a river, saving him. Asking how he is, the man asks for their help as he has no memory of who he is. Deciding to help him, Wataru brought the man home, only for him and Shizuka to deal with re-teaching the man how to eat before naming him "Dai-Chan". Overtime, after yelling at Dai-Chan for accidentally breaking a violin, Wataru apologizes after seeing Dai-Chan fixing the bike of a young girl named Eriko. However, Dai-Chan runs off and Wataru answers the Bloody Rose's call to fight the resurfaced Lion Fangire, fighting him as Kiva using the Garulu Saber. However, he is overwhelmed by the Lion Fangire's brute force.
16	"Player: The Rules of Cruelty"; Transliteration: "Pureiyā Hijō no Rūru" (Japanese: プレイヤー・非情のルール)	Takao Nagaishi	Toshiki Inoue	11 May 2008
In 1986, Jiro is forced to retreat after being unable to fight the Lion Fangire as both Garulu and as Ixa. In the aftermath, Yuri finds the Ixa Knuckle that Jiro had dropped to get her revenge as the Rook resumes his Time Play with a group of skateboarders. Waiting for Otoya to leave the hospital, Jiro reluctantly asks Otoya for them to work together to keep Yuri from the Lion Fangire, with Otoya agreeing to the one-time truce. After finding Yuri, who refuses their help, Otoya knocks her unconscious to ensure she does not get involved before Jiro takes the Ixa Knuckle. The two manage to find the Rook while he is in the middle of his Time Play for people with balloons, with Jiro going at the Rook as Ixa and losing as Otoya takes the Ixa Knuckle. But Yuri arrives during the fight as she gets her vengeance, enraging Otoya as he becomes Ixa so he and Garulu can double-team the Lion Fangire. However, the Fangire proves too strong for the two and is about to kill them when his watch goes off, forcing him to leave for his penalty. In 2008, though having the upper hand against Kiva in Garulu Form, the Lion Fangire is suddenly in pain and forced to retreat. Later, Wataru and Shizuka play with Dai chan before Eriko Hoteiya, the girl whose bike Dai-chan fixed, treats them to her family's restaurant where Dai-chan receives a job to help regain his memories. Though worried at first, Wataru sees that Dai-chan seems to be doing well, in both his job and his relation to Eriko. However, upon seeing a fountain, Dai-chan starts to regain a bit of his memory of a red tiled fountain, which Wataru found from Megumi's profiling unsolved cases from 1986. Once he is taken to the site where Jiro and Otoya fought the Lion Fangire, Dai-chan collapses from the pain as Eriko takes him away. However, Dai-chan fully awakens as the Rook and devours Eriko and everyone in her restaurant home as Wataru runs in. Though horrified, Wataru becomes Kiva and fights the Rook until the Lion Fangire summons a golden Sabbat to finish Kiva off for him. Though Kivat summons Castle Doran, it is tossed aside by the Powerd Ixer in its inaugural battle, destroying the Sabbat as Castle Doran devours Kiva and flies off.
17	"Lesson: My Way"; Transliteration: "Ressun Mai Wei" (Japanese: レッスン・マイウェイ)	Hidenori Ishida	Shōji Yonemura	18 May 2008
In 1986, Otoya was playing his violin when Yuri comes looking for him, asking him to take on a girl named Mami Kurasawa as his violin student to have her overcome her slump and pass the audition. Though he refused at first, he accepts under the condition that Yuri goes on with him on a date. After reasoning with the spoiled girl over the fact they both have a lot to gain, Otoya treats her to the Café mald'amour, having the girl scrub toilets to pay for both their meal and his overdue tabs. When Jiro arrives, Otoya demands the Ixa system back from him, with the two deciding to settle the Ixa matter once and for all in a game of pool with Mami as their witness. In 2008, after being eaten by Castle Doran, Wataru is taken by Jiro into a chamber to treat his injuries from the Lion Fangire, Rook. Hearing the voices of the Arms Monsters as Jiro tells Ramon and Riki to let him live to honor their vow to Otoya, Wataru wakes up to find himself at his house but curious about his father's mentioning in his dream. While this occurred, Keisuke pursued a maniacal criminal named Sakichi Sakaguchi for most of the day, exhausted from the chase when Sakaguchi assumes his true form, the Seastar Fangire, and manhandles Keisuke. The next day, still troubled from the events surrounding Dai-chan/Rook, Wataru questions his reason for fighting the Fangire and leaves the house to clear his head. It was at that time that Wataru meets an adult Mami Kurasawa, who takes him under her wing. Upon learning of his profession, Mami takes him with her to the gym, getting into a confrontation with Megumi over who gets to teach Wataru until she nearly collapses, revealing that she had an encounter with a Fangire. When Wataru hears the Bloody Rose responding to the Seastar Fangire's attack, he runs to fight the monster as Kiva until Keisuke arrives to take out Kiva, using the Garulu Fake Fuestle to take the Garulu Saber for his own use.
18	"Quartet: Listen to Your Heart's Voice"; Transliteration: "Karutetto Kokoro no Koe o Kike" (Japanese: カルテット・心の声を聴け)	Hidenori Ishida	Shōji Yonemura	25 May 2008
In 1986, in spite of Jiro's having the advantage, Otoya wins full use of the Ixa Knuckle by sheer dumb luck. But Jiro refuses to accept the win and calls it a pocket match as Yuri arrives to scold Otoya for lying to Mami at the café, with the girl running off. After tailing Mami that she is in a slump because she does not perform from the heart, Otoya manages to convince her to go to the audition and play from the heart. With Yuri and Otoya watching her performance at her first audition, Mami wins the praise of her audience. Later, after learning that his outing with Mami and Yuri is the date with Yuri, Otoya's violin playing touches Mami as she admits she never wanted to play the violin. Otoya offers her his final teaching to do things one really wants to do: Listen to the voice in your heart. In 2008, just Ixa is about to kill him with the Garulu Saber, the Seastar Fangire's interference allows Kiva to escape with Keisuke losing it. The event also scarred Wataru as he no longer wants to fight the Fangires, almost smashing the Bloody Rose and forcing Kivat to attempt to head to the site himself were it not for his cold. However, unknown to Wataru, Mami is being attacked by the Seastar Fangire with Megumi attempting to protect her until a maddened Keisuke arrives to get revenge on the Seastar Fangire. However, after the Fangire is forced into human form, Keisuke ends up being arrested by the police again with Sakaguchi's smirk the final straw, as Keisuke goes insane to the point of attacking the police to bust Sakaguchi out just to finally get a button from him. When Wataru goes to Mami after learning of the attack, he finds her practicing archery in spite of her injury. After giving him the very same advice Otoya gave her long ago, to listen to the voice in his heart, Wataru decides to follow his heart as the Bloody Rose reacts. The Seastar Fangire once again attacks Mami, with Kiva arriving to her aid. But with Kivat's cold, Kiva has a disadvantage against the Seastar Fangire, forcing him to summon all three of the Arms Monsters and trust his feelings to assume a new form: DoGaBaKi Form. After the Seastar Fangire's soul is devoured by Castle Doran, Mami resumes her archery with Wataru and Megumi watching as Wataru is unaware of Mami's relation to his father.
19	"Fusion: Aura Storm"; Transliteration: "Fyūjon Ōra no Arashi" (Japanese: フュージョン・オーラの嵐)	Kenzo Maihara	Toshiki Inoue	1 June 2008
In 1986, after attacking a woman for being rude to him, the Rook decides to target brides in their wedding dresses as part of his Time Play. However, Yuri was attending a wedding at time as the Rook crashes it, attempting to take her revenge as the Fangire spares her and simply walks off to Yuri's dismay. Later at the café, Yuri begs Jiro to give her the Ixa Knuckle to get her revenge, with Jiro refusing to her request as he wishes to kill the Rook himself. However, Otoya manages to dupe Jiro out of the Ixa Knuckle with a fake Susan Kumiko autograph. After giving the item to Yuri out of sympathy, she slugged him to keep him from interfering. Though she finds Rook, Yuri could not bring herself to use the Ixa System as the Rook simply walks past her again without a second glance. In 2008, while gathering snails with Shizuka for his latest varnish experiment, Wataru gets harassed by some bullies until Kengo arrives to the boy's aid. Later at the café, Kengo reveals that since his encounter with the Rhinoceros Fangire, he has become a fan of Kiva much to Keisuke's annoyance. When Megumi arrives, she and Kengo suggest that they find out who Kiva is much to Wataru's dismay and Keisuke's approval. To that end, the four go to a fortune teller who conducts a seance to track down Kiva. Before it can even start and reveal Kiva's secret, the fortune teller loses consciousness along with Wataru, who, upon waking up, starts acting more confident and eccentric to everyone's shock before returning to normal. Once regaining control after a momentary possession, Wataru is alerted to the Ladybug Fangire as he begins his attack on the bullies that harassed Wataru earlier. Kiva arrives and drives the Fangire away in Basshaa Form, but under the influence of another as the battle ended. The escaping Ladybug Fangire encounters Keisuke and Kengo, knocking the Ixa Knuckle out of Keisuke's hands as Megumi arrives to get it. However, Megumi was unable to bring herself to use the Ixa System as the Ladybug Fangire takes Keisuke and Kengo away as hostages, only to encounter Wataru who reveals that he is spiritually possessed from beyond the grave by his father, Otoya.
20	"Nocturne: The Lovely Messiah"; Transliteration: "Yasōkyoku Ai no Kyūseishu" (Japanese: 夜想曲・愛の救世主)	Kenzo Maihara	Toshiki Inoue	8 June 2008
In 1986, Otoya catches up to Yuri as she lies about bringing herself to use the Ixa System when she encountered the Rook earlier. However, when Otoya tries to find her at another wedding to assist her, he encounters a beautiful woman in black, Maya, before the Rook arrives to devour the bride, knocking Otoya out. Before the Rook could kill the bride, he is stopped by Maya, whom he knew as the Queen of the Checkmate Four. After telling the Rook to leave, Maya kills the bride herself after revealing her to be a Fangire who betrayed their kind by falling in love with a human. While this all had happened, Yuri only watched before running off in fear. Otoya found her and gave her a shoulder to cry on, much to Jiro's dismay. Meanwhile, Maya can be seen walking under a red moon, with a Kivat flying around her. In 2008, the Ladybug Fangire manages to escape the Otoya-possessed Wataru, taking both Keisuke and Kengo with him as his hostages to force Megumi to fight him as her leg was injured from the fight. "Otoya" arrives to teach Megumi how to overcome her anxiety, with Megumi refusing to listen to him. She was also confused of his knowledge of her mother's name and annoyed with Wataru's constant harassment. When he threatens to toss the Ixa Knuckle into a fire, and ultimately the Ixa system with it, Megumi manages to overcome her injuries before the device is incinerated. "Otoya" follows Megumi to where Keisuke and Kengo are being held, with Megumi holding her own against the Ladybug Fangire before releasing the hostages. Keisuke becomes Ixa as he and Megumi double-team the Ladybug Fangire. Wataru walks off and returns to normal. Once Ixa kills the Ladybug Fangire, his soul expands and transforms itself into a Sabbat. Upon witnessing the Sabbat, Wataru transforms into Kiva to summon Castle Doran as Ixa calls the Powerd Ixer, who promptly arrives. After a short wait, the dragon eventually emerges from beneath the ground and picks up Powerd Ixer to Ixa's shock as the Riders combine their attacks to shatter the Sabbat. Afterwards, as Wataru recuperates at home with no memory of his possession, he wonders who was making a violin in his workshop, amazed at the framework he did under Otoya's influence.
21	"Rhapsody: The Fate of the Ring"; Transliteration: "Rapusodī Yubiwa no Yukue" (Japanese: ラプソディー・指輪の行方)	Takao Nagaishi	Toshiki Inoue	22 June 2008
In 1986, Yuri treats Otoya to a ramen shack after the Lion Fangire wedding incident to Jiro's dismay as Ramon and Riki become worried about him. The next day, Jiro takes Yuri to the park and offers his hand to her in marriage, leaving her with the engagement ring. With Shima's hands tied and Otoya stating his annoyance at Jiro's dirty trick, Yuri sets up a gōkon with Otoya, Jiro, Riki and two girls, Ayumi and Kumi. It is then that Otoya meets his old childhood sweetheart Kumi from kindergarten. After secretly feeding on Ayumi for refusing to bear his children, Riki takes his leave from the mixer finding the Chameleon Fangire as he is about to feed. Riki fights him in his true form as Dogga of the Franken Race before feeding on the escaping Fangire's victim. In 2008, since the Ladybug Fangire incident, Kengo pleads to Keisuke to become his pupil. To gain Keisuke's approval to be his pupil of his learning harsh training, Kengo treats him, Wataru, and Megumi to a gōkon with two other girls named Sachie and Keiko. However, the mixer goes sour when Keisuke gets their waitress in trouble with Wataru's following her. As Wataru and the waitress see that they have a lot in common, Keisuke intercepts the Chameleon Fangire to take him out. However, the Fangire uses his cloaking ability to escape Ixa and then later Kiva.
22	"Overture: Fateful Intersection"; Transliteration: "Jokyoku Unmei no Kōsaten" (Japanese: 序曲・運命の交差点)	Takao Nagaishi	Toshiki Inoue	29 June 2008
In 1986, Otoya starts working at a construction site at Kumi's request to help her hospitalized brother out of a jam, in hopes to finally get his "18-year old due" kiss. Later, Jiro takes Yuri to the Luxur clothing store owned by a man named Yamashita, where Yuri learns that Kumi is actually playing him to play the must expensive outfit there. When Shima reveals that Luxur is tied to the recent Fangire attacks, Yuri manages to pay the best outfit Luxur had and Otoya disguise himself as a woman to lure out Yamashita, who reveals himself as the Chameleon Fangire as he attempts to kill Otoya out of craze rage as Yuri and Otoya arrive and force the Fangire to retreat. Later, Yuri explains to Jiro that she is not ready for a commitment, with Otoya taking Yuri's engagement ring and tossing it into the lake, along with Jiro's ring. In 2008, Wataru learns from Kengo that the waitress they met is named Mio Suzuki, who Kengo has feelings for. But after Mio's date with Kengo goes horribly wrong, Megumi pairs her with Wataru to Kengo's dismay. The two later go to the Casuar clothing store owned by Yamashita, before Wataru later buys her a ring. But after being fired from her job, Mio runs off only to encounter Yamashita as Kiva to fight the Chameleon Fangire, whose cloaking abilities catch Kiva off guard. To counter this, Kiva uses the Dogga Hammer to expose the Chameleon Fangire before shattering him. Later, Mio puts on Wataru's ring as the two fall in love with each other.
23	"Variation: Fugitives Forever"; Transliteration: "Hensōkyoku Eien no Tōbōsha" (Japanese: 変奏曲・永遠の逃亡者)	Hidenori Ishida	Toshiki Inoue	6 July 2008
In 1986, finding Ramon and Riki's massage parlor closed down for lacking a permit, Jiro gets Ramon and Riki jobs at the Café mald'amour to the surprise of Otoya. The next day, Otoya provides Riki with his advice on love. While this occurs, Shinji Takeuchi saves the relationship with his wife Ryōko, and later is followed by Maya, who recognizes him as another traitor Fangire trying to live with humans. Before she can kill anyone, she encounters Otoya, whose interference allows Shinji and Ryōko to escape as she runs off to find them. When Jiro feels that Otoya is once more getting too close to Yuri, he assumes his true form and beats Otoya unconscious. Garulu throws Otoya's body into a river, asserting that Yuri is his to take as his mate. In 2008, Megumi tries to make Wataru and Mio more of a couple and convinces her photographer and agent to bring Mio onto the next photo shoot when her friend Leona cannot attend the shoot. Once there, Mio is unable to smile until she sees Wataru watching them. However, when Shinji steals a pearl necklace from the photoshoot, Wataru chases after him until he encounters the Grizzly Fangire. Kiva is unable to defeat the Fangire, even after transforming into Garulu Form. The Grizzly Fangire escapes and resumes his guise as Shinji, entering a hospital to present the pearl necklace to a hospitalized Ryōko.
24	"Emperor: Golden Fever"; Transliteration: "Kōtei Gōruden Fībā" (Japanese: 皇帝・ゴールデンフィーバー)	Hidenori Ishida	Toshiki Inoue	13 July 2008
In 1986, after being attacked by Garulu and thrown into a river, Otoya is saved by Shinji and Ryōko. Yuri arrives to meet Riki who takes Otoya's advice to ask for her love, as Jiro arrives to tell her that Otoya has been killed by a Fangire. Refusing to accept it, Jiro abducts her as she demands to know Otoya's location. While this occurs, Shinji encounters Maya as she is about to kill him for his betrayal for trying to live among humans. But Otoya's influence allows the Grizzly Fangire to run off as Maya berates him for his meddling, with him running into Riki who reveals Jiro's actions. Once Otoya arrives to Yuri's aid, a crazed Jiro reveals his true nature as a Wolfen in front Yuri. Once breaking free, Yuri pleas for Garulu to stop and refuses to ever love him as she admits her feelings for Otoya. The enraged Wolfen threatens to kill her if he cannot have her, but he cannot follow through and takes his leave in shame as Yuri is happy that Otoya is still alive. In 2008, Shinji learns that the deadly illness Ryōko is suffering from has taken a turn for the worse. While this takes place, the relationship between Mio and Wataru grows stronger to the point that Megumi finds her task complete. While Wataru talks to Kengo, Shinji is chased down by Keisuke and is forced to reveal himself as the Grizzly Fangire before escaping to give the ring he stole to Ryōko, with Wataru following him. After explaining himself to Wataru, Shinji runs to Ryōko as she asks him for a final request: to be taken to the site where they planted the silk tree years ago. After Mio provides the use of her bento delivery van, Wataru gets Shinji and Ryōko to the tree, where Ryōko reveals that she always knew that Shinji is a Fangire and loves him still. However, once Ryōko finally dies, Keisuke arrives and a devastated Shinji savagely attacks Ixa. During the fight, the Grizzly Fangire realizes who Mio really is once seeing the Queen's crest on her, and seeks to kill her with Wataru begging him to come to his senses. Once Mio is knocked unconscious, Wataru loses his composure and becomes Kiva to take revenge on the Grizzly Fangire. Kiva's rage calls forth Tatsulot who transforms Kiva into Emperor Form. With his full power realized, Kiva mortally wounds the Grizzly Fangire with the Emperor Moon Break. As Shinji crawls back to Ryōko before he dies, Wataru tries to find Mio, who walks off acting strangely.
25	"Fanfare: The Queen's Awakening"; Transliteration: "Fanfāre Joō no Mezame" (Japanese: ファンファーレ・女王の目醒め)	Shojiro Nakazawa	Toshiki Inoue	20 July 2008
In 1986, after giving Otoya a wrist watch to thank him, Yuri learns that Jiro has disappeared since revealing his true nature and has mailed the Ixa Knuckle back to Shima. Shima decides to induct Otoya into the Wonderful Blue Sky Organization as the Ixa System's official user with Yuri warmly welcoming it though a bit worried before Otoya promises to help Yuri find her mother's ring. After killing another Fangire traitor, Maya encounters Otoya as the Rook has a new Time Play, attacking Otoya because of the flower on his person. Otoya grabs Maya and tries to give the Rook the slip before looking for an escape route. Once the Rook recognizes Maya, she admits that she is curious as to why Fangires are attracted to humans and allows the Rook to continue his game to understand humans as Otoya returns and becomes Ixa to battle the Lion Fangire. Otoya is no match for the stronger opponent as the Ixa System overloads. When Maya checks to see if he is alright, Otoya wakes up with no memory of who he is, only knowing that he loves someone named Yuri, with Maya taking advantage by claiming herself to be "Yuri." In 2008, Wataru is happy to see Mio after the Grizzly Fangire incident and doing well with her job, with Megumi urging the two to on another date much to Keisuke's dismay as he tells them not go slow with their relationship. However, while on the job, Mio sees people mysteriously die around her and freaks out. Afraid that whatever is going on may kill him as well, Mio distances herself from Wataru without explaining why. She encounters the Bishop of the Checkmate Four, who reveals to Mio her true identity as the new Queen and tells her to stop fighting her urges and embrace her true self. Refusing to carry out the task of killing Fangire traitors, Mio later is attacked by Ryo and the Shark Fangire, who is the one behind the mysterious deaths. Megumi and Keisuke arrive and hold the two Fangires off as Mio run away. During the fight, Ryo manages to steal the idle Ixa System Keisuke dropped as the Shark Fangire drags him off to pursue Mio. The two run into Wataru as he becomes Kiva and battles the two Fangires, outmatched by them until Tatsulot arrives and changes Kiva into Emperor Form to shatter the Shark Fangire with the Emperor Moon Break as the Spider Fangire escapes.
26	"Metronome: Miraculous Memory"; Transliteration: "Metoronōmu Kioku no Kiseki" (Japanese: メトロノーム・記憶のキセキ)	Shojiro Nakazawa	Toshiki Inoue	27 July 2008
In 1986, Maya takes advantage of Otoya's memory loss by pretending to be Yuri, ordering the Rook to halt his Game out of her curiosity for human love. Later, after playing his violin for Maya, Otoya remembers his promise to Yuri as he makes his way to Saihama to takes a dive in the sea to fetch the ring of Yuri's mother for her. By that time, Yuri arrives to see Maya who asks her the meaning of "love", with Yuri's answering before seeing Otoya and saving him from nearly drowning, regaining his memories from the near-death experience. As Otoya gives Yuri her mother's ring, Maya had taken her leave with a red rose on Otoya's violin and increase of curiosity about human love. In 2008, Wataru is worried about Mio's whereabouts, as she is unable to willingly accept being the Queen to the Bishop's dismay as he kills a Target Fangire traitor and his human girlfriend to Mio's dismay as a warning to her. Turning to Wataru for help, Mio apologizes for running off before she leaves without goodbye. She is then ambushed by Ryo with the Bishop watching in hopes Mio will awaken as the new Queen. However, Keisuke arrives to reclaim the Ixa system as Ryo uses it against him. However, by taking advantage of the Fangire's obsession with her, Megumi lowers Ryo's guard down so she can knock the Ixa Knuckle back to Keisuke. Though Ryo escapes Ixa, he makes an attempt to kill Mio for ruining his love life, attacking Wataru when he intervenes before accidentally provoking Mio into a full-awakening as the new Queen. Though the Spider Fangire attempts to flee her, Kiva blocks his escape in Emperor Form using the Garulu Saber to wound him before Mio personally kills Ryo herself later. As for Keisuke, in spite of his earlier decision, Shima decides to let him keep the Ixa Knuckle and the eventual upgrade that goes with it when Keisuke fakes admitting his flaws.
27	"80's: Angry Rising Blue"; Transliteration: "Eitīzu Ikareru Raijingu Burū" (Japanese: 80's・怒れるライジングブルー)	Takao Nagaishi	Toshiki Inoue	3 August 2008
In 2008, Keisuke receives the upgraded Ixa Knuckle and the Ixariser while working out. Later, Megumi is arrested on suspicion of armed robbery while Shima has been arrested on suspicion of murder. With only Keisuke free, he recruits Kengo to help him investigate the meaning behind the arrests before the Crab Fangire appears, having Ixa use Ixariser to become Rising Ixa. However, the new form proved too powerful to handle as the Fangire escapes. After almost being arrested by the police, losing the Ixa Knuckle in the ensuing escape, Keisuke encounters the man responsible for the framings, a former painter named Tanahashi. At his former studio, Tanahashi reveals that use his position as chief of police to set up the framings to get back at the Blue Sky Organization for Ixa ruining his life in the past when a Fangire attack that ends up with him being coma for a year with his model, Maya, nowhere to be found. After revealing what occurred to Wataru and Kengo, Keisuke is forced to run until he has a chance encounter with Jiro, who offers the means to stop these current events: Castle Doran's Time Door. While this occurred, after remembering his first friend, Taiga, Wataru goes to Kengo's aid when he is attacked by the Crab Fangire while looking for Keisuke. In 1986, Otoya and Yuri encounter Keisuke on the day Yuri moves in with Otoya, who is annoyed with them living together as he comes to the realization that he is in the past and can alter it to ensure Tanahashi is never harmed and set up warrants for the Blue Sky Organizations' arrests. When Keisuke arrives to Tanahashi's studio to wait out the previous Ixa, as Tanahashi is painting his portrait of Maya with Otoya providing musical atmosphere, he sees the Cicada Fangire and keeps him from entering the house until Otoya arrives and becomes Ixa to Keisuke's shock. Seeing Otoya as the result for the present crisis, Keisuke demands the past Ixa Knuckle from him.
28	"Request: Time-Altering Battle"; Transliteration: "Rikuesuto Toki o Kaeru Tatakai" (Japanese: リクエスト・時を変える戦い)	Takao Nagaishi	Toshiki Inoue	17 August 2008
In 1986, after a failed attempt to take the past Ixa Knuckle from Otoya, Keisuke goes to Shima to explain himself from being the future though Otoya thinks he is lying. When he attempts to confront Otoya at Tanahashi's Studio, Keisuke meets Maya and falls in love with her to his shock. After an attempt to blackmail Otoya by kidnapping Yuri, Maya saves him and questions him about the feeling of love. Although Keisuke cannot answer directly, he gives her his good luck charm, the first button he received from bounty hunting. The Cicada Fangire arrives, revealing Maya as a Fangire as he pleads with her to stop being with humans. When the Fangire arrives to kill Tanahashi, Otoya arrives as Keisuke is witness to crucial fight between Otoya and the Cicada Fangire had already begun, with the Fangire taking Tanahashi as a hostage. Keisuke manages to intervene before Tanahashi is wounded in the crossfire as Castle Doran's Time Door closes on Keisuke's time in 1986, with the Cicada Fangire escaping his predestined demise as a result while Maya looks after her infant son, Taiga. In 2008, while visiting Shima, Wataru and Kengo are temporary deputized as Fangire Hunters to counter the Crab Fangire as he goes on a feeding frenzy. However, once Keisuke made the changes, Megumi joins the fray as Wataru manages to transform into Kiva behind a pillar and support the two until the Cicada Fangire arrives to aid the Crab Fangire in double teaming Kiva. By then, Keisuke arrives and takes out the Cicada Fangire as Rising Ixa while Kiva shatters the Crab Fangire in Emperor Form with the Garulu Saber. Back at the café, Keisuke is shocked to find out that Wataru is in possession of what he referred to as an heirloom from his mother; the very same button that Keisuke gave to Maya in 1986.
29	"When the Saints Go Marching In: I Am King"; Transliteration: "Seija no Kōshin Ware koso Kingu" (Japanese: 聖者の行進・我こそキング)	Hidenori Ishida	Toshiki Inoue	24 August 2008
In 1986, as Yuri cleans Otoya's home, she admits she still desires to get revenge on the Rook and questions if it is alright to be happy at the present time. While having a Time Play to target sunglasses-wearing people, the Rook is confronted by Jiro, with the Wolfen wanting to end his affairs with the Fangire. After losing the fight and his sunglasses to Rook, Jiro enlists Otoya's aid along with Ramon and Riki as they reveal their true identities, with Otoya agreeing on the condition that Yuri is left in the dark about their plan. Jiro and Otoya until the Rook arrives with to continue the Time Play. Otoya assumes Ixa to battle the Lion Fangire and loses to him as Yuri arrives and attempts to get her revenge. In 2008, while going on a jog, Wataru meets Megumi as he was training himself until he receives a call from Mio. Meeting her, the two finally reconcile things between them as both Shizuka and the Bishop take offense to this turn of events, as the Bishop reminds Mio of her fate to be with the new King once he is found. While this all occurred, Shima bring his group to meet their benefactor and Megumi, Mitsuhide Aso, who solely attempts to force her to keep her word to leave the Wonderful Blue Sky Organization, but Megumi wishes to finish his mother's unfinished business, Rook. While Shizuka attempts to sabotage his relation to Mio, Wataru senses the Warthog Fangire Abel, and runs off to face him. After learning Aberu's goal intent to become the new King of the Checkmate Four, Kiva assumes Emperor Form to battle. Meanwhile, Megumi encounters Rook, who now is doing good deeds in place of his Time Play in the past, fighting the Fangire.
30	"Curtain Raising: Kiva's Identity"; Transliteration: "Kaien Kiba no Shōtai" (Japanese: 開演・キバの正体)	Hidenori Ishida	Toshiki Inoue	31 August 2008
In 1986, the Rook nearly kills Yuri when Jiro intervenes to finish their game, mocking the Rook with a new pair of sunglasses before Yuri is taken to the hospital. Otoya visits her with flowers and advises her not to get back to work so quickly, but she remains adamant as she cannot rest until she avenges her mother. After Otoya & Jiro trick her to go to Ryokuchi Park, with Riki acting as a decoy Rook, Otoya tracks down the Rook and summons Jiro, Ramon, and Riki to battle, becoming Ixa as the trio assume their true forms. Using sunglasses as bait, Ixa and the Arms Monsters fight the Lion Fangire as Yuri arrives, with the Rook winning the game. In 2008, after the Warthog Fangire walks off after defeating Kiva, vowing to kill him once he becomes the King, Wataru is depressed that Mio is not answering his calls, due to Shizuka's meddling. Things get worse as his friendship with Kengo also gets strained when Wataru learned that Kengo could never play guitar again and hid the truth until Kengo left. Keisuke decides to offer his aid to excuse to investigate his thoughts on Wataru, as Shizuka realizes the consequences of her actions, setting Wataru and Mio on a date. While this all occurred, after Megumi is wounded from her own fight with Rook, Mitsuhide pleas his sister to leave the Fangire Hunters with Megumi refusing as she vows to finish what her mother started. However, Mitsuhide goes over his sister's head to have Shima relieve her of her duties. But refusing to let that stop her, Megumi poses as an assistant to Red Man, a potential Fangire target. Though the Rook arrived to offer his aid, he knocked Megumi out as Aberu arrives to kill Red Man, resulting with a battle between the two Fangires. Keisuke arrives to intervene, becoming Rising Ixa until Wataru shows up to even the odds. While Keisuke deals with Aberu, Wataru battles the Rook in Emperor Form. But during the fight, the Fangires take their leave as Keisuke witnesses Kiva regress back to Wataru, with the Bishop showing interest in the revelation.
31	"Applause: Motherly Dedicated Transformation"; Transliteration: "Kassai Haha ni Sasageru Henshin" (Japanese: 喝采・母に捧げる変身)	Hidenori Ishida	Toshiki Inoue	7 September 2008
In 1986, as the Rook enjoys his award for beating Otoya and company, the guys mope until Yuri steals the Ixa Knuckle. As Otoya and Jiro run after her, she finds Rook, showing the "awesome item" as he takes the Ixa Knuckle instead and uses it to battle Otoya and Jiro. Ramon and Riki arrive, but the three (Arms Monsters, Otoya, and Yuri) are not a match for Rook. Fortunately, Ixa's side-effects manage to weaken the Rook as Yuri intended. The Lion Fangire snaps into a berserker rage as Otoya increases his power by wearing Ixa suit,. In the middle of the fight, Otoya gives Yuri the Ixa Knuckle to finish the job, allowing her to fulfill her desire to defeat the Rook with the Ixa Knuckle at the right shoulder. But though she was still unable to kill him, she could finally put the past behind her as the Rook fades away to rest until he reawakens to start a new game. In 2008, after learning that he is Kiva, Keisuke is shocked as he decides to takes Wataru on his apprentice to the dismay of Kengo, who runs off in rage before being found by Shima who tells him to consider . Wataru later meets up with Mio, as he tells her about how and his friend Taiga got separated. But the Bishop spirits Mio away to the Checkmate Four's base of operations, assigning her the task to destroy Kiva before introducing her to the King. While this all occurred, after reporting to Shima the new turn of events relating to the King, Megumi reveals to Mitsuhide that she was fighting in his place for their mother. After the siblings apologize to each other and finally understood each other. Later, Megumi, researches on 1st generation Blue Sky Organization report her mother wrote and finds the Rook's weakness, which her mother created during her final fight with Rook. Though she asks him for the Ixa Knukcle, Keisuke attempts to reason with her not to fight for another. Later, while telling her brother that she is staying, Aberu arrives to kill Mitsuhide after learning that he strangely won the lottery twice, with Megumi fighting off the Fangire to protect her brother from him until Keisuke arrives in Rising Ixa Form. But the Rook arrives to demand Megumi to kill him, attacking her when she failed to do it as Kiva arrives to fight the Lion Fangire off in Emperor Form. After the two Fangires switch opponents, with the Rook now intent to kill Ixa, Keisuke accepts Megumi's wish and allows her to use the Ixa System to finish off the Rook for good by targeting his shoulder with Ixa Calibur. While Megumi is relieved that one of her mother's unfinished affairs has been resolved, Keisuke oversees Kiva shattering the Warthog Fangire as Mio arrives to witness it before she assumes her true form to kill Kiva, the Pearlshell Fangire.
32	"New World: Another Kiva"; Transliteration: "Shinsekai Mō Hitori no Kiba" (Japanese: 新世界・もう一人のキバ)	Ryuta Tasaki	Toshiki Inoue	14 September 2008
In 1986, after she succeeded in defeating the Rook and avenging her mother's death, Yuri questions her next step and consider marriage to Otoya, as he got himself burned by the iron. Otoya later finds Maya with a violin, drawing him in with her amazing ability to play like him before she leaves him with a question for her ability to copy his playing and goes into Castle Doran to see Taiga. Later, Maya goes to Otoya to see if he could answer her question as Riki arrives to fight her, forcing Maya to reveal her true identity as the Pearlshell Fangire before a shocked Otoya. In 2008, after an intense battle with the Pearlshell Fangire as Kiva, a wounded Wataru finds Mio equally wounded with neither aware of the other's true identity as they treat each other and lie about their injuries. Mio later encounters the Bishop as he explains of her and the King's place as Fangire Clan's protectors after she vows to kill Kiva. Meanwhile, at the D&P company, after a successful trial test of a corporation requesting funding for a newly developed metal, the company's CEO takes his leave. He later rescues Wataru when Keisuke had him catch a crook as part of his training. After driving the crook off, Wataru eventually recognizes the man as his childhood friend, Taiga. He later meets Mio for dinner as he explains his role as the King while his aide Kurosawa murders the corporation scientist. The next day, after Wataru learns that Taiga has a fiance, he arrives to find a pharmacist murdered by the Moose Fangire for creating a medicine that would revolutionize mankind. As Kiva battles the Moose Fangire in Emperor Form, a new figure arrives with intent to oversee the fight, Kamen Rider Saga.
33	"Supersonic: Saga's Fight"; Transliteration: "Sūpāsonikku Tatakai no Saga" (Japanese: スーパーソニック・闘いのサガ)	Ryuta Tasaki	Toshiki Inoue	21 September 2008
In 1986, after defeating Dogga for attacking her, Maya is surprised to see Otoya remaining in spite of knows her true identity as a Fangire. Walking with her, rather than fight her, Otoya asks Maya for the answer Maya asked him. Revealing that it is the violin meant for the violinist that brings out the talent, Otoya remembers his encounter with Ōmura and his Black Star, as Maya offers to teach him the violin-making arts before leaving to see Taiga with Kurosawa worried about his mistress' interest in humans. Maya then heads to Otoya's house as they begin their work on the "ultimate violin", with Yuri looking on with a broken heart before walking off. In 2008, Kiva's fight with the Moose Fangire is watched by Saga, who takes his leave after the Fangire retreats and Kiva reverts as he walks into Mio, who pleas him not to let her go as Wataru promises her that he'll stay by her side. After Taiga finishes a meeting with a young man named Numakawa, he sees Wataru and invite him out to dinner for him to meet his fiance. When Wataru finds out the fiance is Mio, Wataru is shocked as he gets down in the dumps that his girlfriend is seeing his best friend. Later after a talk with Keisuke, who wishes to know more about Maya, Mio arrives to explain that the engagement was arranged and she has no choice in the matter. But her words fall on deaf ears as Shizuka escorts Mio out, with the heart-broken girl running into Kurosawa who attempts to kill Mio when Taiga interferes, disowning the Fangire's aid for his attempt. The next day, clueless of the feelings of Wataru and Mio, Taiga helps Mio with a second chance to execute Numakuwa, who is a Fangire she let go in a previous confrontation. But Mio could not do it as the Tortoise Fangire runs into Kurosawa who attempts to clean up her mess just as Wataru arrives and fights the Moose Fangire. However, as Kiva assumes Emperor Form and uses the Dogga Hammer to destroy the Moose Fangire, a weakened Numakuwa runs into Taiga who reveals himself as the new King of the Checkmate Four, Kamen Rider Saga, who slays the Tortoise Fangire with Kiva's insignia in the sky.
34	"Noise: Melody of Destruction"; Transliteration: "Noizu Hakai no Senritsu" (Japanese: ノイズ・破壊の旋律)	Takao Nagaishi	Toshiki Inoue	28 September 2008
In 1986, Otoya and Maya continue to craft the "ultimate violin" together as Yuri suffers in silence about the heartbreak of seeing Otoya with another woman until she had enough. In 2008, Wataru is still in a depression since learning that Mio is engaged to Taiga yet wishes the best for her. After Keisuke and Megumi try to cheer him up, Taiga shows up and cluelessly invites Wataru to join Mio and himself in going to an amusement park. There, Wataru and Mio discuss Taiga, with Mio trying to admit her love to him. Then, a fugitive named Tatsu Murakawa takes hostages at the funhouse with Keisuke attempting to catch the man. When Kengo shows up and beats the escaping criminal he expresses his hatred towards Keisuke and Wataru, now a changed man after being under Shima's wing and member of the Blue Sky Organization. Both of these new issues eventually cause the Bloody Rose to crack in response to Wataru's stress. Meanwhile, Dr. Kanda, a former member of Blue Sky Organization, kidnaps a mysterious girl named Kaede and uses her for his research on Fangires by having her feed on them in experiments and becoming one herself. Later, Mio admits to the Bishop that she cannot take being the Queen anymore, with the Fangire learning from Taiga that he realizes Mio is in love with another. This leads the Bishop to personally attack Wataru in his true form, as the Swallowtail Fangire, demanding to learn the identity of his parents. Keisuke arrives to Wataru's aid as Rising Ixa, until Kaede arrives to attack him as the Horsefly Fangire under Kanda's orders while Wataru battles the Bishop in Emperor Form. However, the Fangires escape with Keisuke severely wounded from his fight. While Taiga starts to punish Kaede for her actions against their kind, after being advised by the Bishop, Mio manages to make her way to a cave where she finds the one who can help her: Maya, the former Queen of the Checkmate Four.
35	"New Arrangement: Flying Rose"; Transliteration: "Nyū Arenji Hishō no Bara" (Japanese: ニューアレンジ･飛翔のバラ)	Takao Nagaishi	Toshiki Inoue	5 October 2008
In 1986, as Otoya makes the finishing touches on the "Ultimate Violin", Yuri runs off into Jiro, who learns of the man's relation to Maya and sees him, only to be shut out by him. Once he gives it a first play for Maya, after giving it his deepest desire to preserve all music for all time, Otoya christens his creation the Bloody Rose. In 2008, Wataru attempts to repair the Bloody Rose while Mio asks Maya to release her from being Queen, only to be told that it is the power of the Queen that determines that. While this all occurred, as the Bishop talks to Taiga about the mysterious Fangire and her relation to Kanda, Keisuke is relieved of his duties due to his injuries from his fight with the Horsefly Fangire as Kengo taking his place as Ixa's user to Keisuke's dismay. However, though Wataru finishes the repairs, he feels something is missing from the Bloody Rose after playing it. By then, Jiro appears to offer his advice to Wataru, revealing Otoya's deepest desires within the violin. While this occurs, in spite of Shima's warning, Kanda is murdered by Kaede who had no more need for him. Later, while making her way to meet Taiga, Mio is captured by the Horsefly Fangire as she intends to feed on her and become even more powerful. Wataru, being by Taiga's side at the time, revealing his feelings for Mio to Taiga as he offers his aid to save her. Wataru manages to find Mio and break her free while holding the Horsefly Fangire off for her to escape before he transforms into Kiva to take their fight outside. In the middle of their battle, Kiva is removed from the area by a Kukulkan conjured by Taiga so he can personally execute the Horsefly Fangire for her crimes against their kind. Realizing Wataru's in danger when it responses to his pain, Tatsulot flies in to give Wataru the Bloody Rose. Playing the instrument, understanding the desire hidden within it and putting in his desire to find his very own music, Wataru turns into Kiva Emperor Form, assuming Flight Style to destroy the Kukulkan. However, the new power causes aftershocks as Kiva's awakening has unearthed a mysterious blade within Castle Doran as Maya felt the presence of her son, Wataru.
36	"Revolution: Sword Legend"; Transliteration: "Kakumei Sōdo Rejendo" (Japanese: 革命・ソードレジェンド)	Shojiro Nakazawa	Toshiki Inoue	12 October 2008
In 1986, as Otoya and Maya toast to the crafting of the Bloody Rose completed, with Otoya telling her this will be their last time together before playing a song he made for her, Yuri battles a Rat Fangire to vent her feelings about Otoya being with the other woman before the monster eludes her. Later, while seeing her son, Maya is visited by her husband, the Checkmate Four's King, lord of all Fangires. In 2008, as Shizuka notices Wataru no longer the shy person he was, the Bishop tells Taiga he'll begin the wedding preparations as Taiga meets with Mio to help him choose the designs for her wedding dress. However, though Mio admits to him that she loves another and cannot go through with it, Taiga refuses to accept it and asks Wataru to find out the one she truly is in love with. When the two spy on Mio as she is approached by Kengo, who Mio called for help in admitting her feelings. However, Kengo attempts to make out with her before Taiga comes in, with Wataru arrives as Taiga drags her off just before Kengo punches Wataru for his interference. He is then taken by Jiro into Castle Doran in an attempt to see if he can pull the unearthed legendary sword of the Fangires' King, the Zanvat Sword. After failing to pull it out, Wataru finds Mio running towards him as a Rat Fangire knocks her out. Assuming Emperor Form to kill the monster, Kiva is ambushed by two more Rat Fangires until Saga arrives to personally kill him to vent his anger, with Kiva managing to evade the stronger opponent. While searching for Kiva, a shocked Taiga overhears Mio admitting her true feelings to Wataru.
37	"Triangle: Behead the King"; Transliteration: "Toraianguru Kingu ga Kiru" (Japanese: トライアングル・キングが斬る)	Shojiro Nakazawa	Toshiki Inoue	19 October 2008
In 1986, Yuri manages to find the Rat Fangire and takes the Ixa Knuckle from Otoya to slay the monster. However, even as Ixa, Yuri is no match for the Fangire as she succumbs to the side-effects. But at the last second, Maya arrives to save the unconscious Yuri for her own reasons to the Rat Fangire's shock as he vows to make her regret it. Later, the King learns of Maya's affairs with Otoya, jams his sword into the wall of Castle Doran in act of expressing his inability to love her. In 2008, after seeing Mio's feelings for him are real, an upbeat Wataru resumes his training to get stronger. However, he feels bad about Taiga who later gives him an invitation to the wedding, telling him it will continue as planned to Wataru's dismay as he takes him he is too weak to protect her. On his way to tell Mio his feelings for her, he finds her about to be ambushed by the Rat Fangire. As Kiva is overwhelmed by the multiplying Rat Fangires, Taiga arrives to see Mio and ordering her to forget Wataru or he'll execute her personally. But the Rat Fangires arrive to kill her to settle their grudge against Maya with Wataru attempting to protect Mio from him, touching her heart as the Fangires knock him out. Once Saga takes Mio away to protect her from her pursuers, Wataru is again brought to Castle Doran and successfully draws the Zanvat Sword with the Arms Monsters creating the Zanvat-bat to limit the power the zanvat sword actually has. Arriving to Mio's aid as Saga is distracted, Wataru assumes Kiva's Emperor Form to shatter the numerous Rat Fangires with the Zanvat Sword. With the Fangires all gone, Kiva and Saga battle each other until Mio reveals herself as the Pearlshell Fangire to protect a defeated Saga, exposing Kiva as Wataru while Saga reverts to Taiga with all three in utter shock.
38	"Erlking: Mother and Child Reunion"; Transliteration: "Maō Haha to Ko no Saikai" (Japanese: 魔王・母と子の再会)	Ryuta Tasaki	Toshiki Inoue	26 October 2008
In 1986, Otoya visits Yuri after her injuries from her fight with the Rat Fangire, telling him he intends to find Maya and settle things. Meanwhile, Maya is threatened by an annoyed the King as he reveals that the Bishop told him of her affair with Otoya and wishes to kill him though Maya tells him she'll be the one to kill him. As Maya visits the Bishop who tells her actions are crimes against their kind and hopes that the King sentences her to a living hell for her sins, Jiro is confronted by the King as he summons Kivat-bat the 2nd and transforms into Dark Kiva to finish what the Rook started with the Wolfen Race. In 2008, Wataru, Taiga, and Mio all learn the other's alternate identities. Wataru, in self-denial over the startling revelations, runs off before collapsing. Jiro takes him back to his house where he helps him cope and snap out of his hysterics. Meanwhile, Taiga demands why the Bishop did not tell him about Wataru with the Bishop telling him and Mio not to bother with Wataru and strive to be the King and Queen. However, Taiga manages to find Maya, demanding answers from the actions of her affair with Otoya. Later, when Wataru and Mio meet to discuss what will happen now as they know the other's identity, Taiga arrives to bring the two to meet Maya so they too can learn the truth. While this occur, Keisuke attempts to coach Kengo into using the Ixa System during a fight with the resurrected Warthog Fangire before getting knocked out. Once in the cave, Wataru recognizes her as his mother as Taiga reveals that he is Wataru's half brother and that Wataru is of Fangire blood, leaving him speechless. The Mantis Fangire then arrives at that time to kill Maya for her past betrayals. Mio takes her to safety while Taiga and Wataru fight off the Fangires resurrected by the Mantis Fangire.
39	"Shout: Targeted Brother"; Transliteration: "Shauto Nerawareta Kyōdai" (Japanese: シャウト・狙われた兄弟)	Ryuta Tasaki	Toshiki Inoue	9 November 2008
In 1986, Garulu manages to escape Dark Kiva after being brutally manhandled by the Fangire King, who then finds Ramon and Riki and attempts to kill them. But even with Jiro's aid, the Arm Monsters were powerless against the King and barely escaped with their lives. Elsewhere, Yuri manages to find Maya, despite Otoya's attempts to stop the confrontation. Once she finds Maya, Yuri questions Maya's relation to him as the Arms Monsters arrive with intent to capture Maya to use her as a hostage to keep the King away from them. Maya reveals herself as a Fangire in front of Yuri as she easily defeats the trio. When Otoya admits that he knew Maya's identity the entire time, Yuri slaps him and leaves. In 2008, after defeating the revived Fangire with his older half-brother, Wataru questions what would do since knowing his nature as a half Fangire as Maya appears to him and tells him that the blood of his father running through him is what truly matters, telling him to suppress Otoya's kindness before she departs. He later meets with Keisuke to join the Blue Sky Organization as an ally, in hopes it would be for the betterment for both sides by revealing his identity to them as well as his nature as a half-Fangire. After learning of Wataru's relation to Otoya, Shima learns Wataru's intent to be the bridge between both races. Though he claims to offer his aid, Shima disagrees with Wataru's intention from personal experience. Things get worse when Taiga offers Wataru a place among the Fangires by his side, which Wataru refuses. Mio later admits she is glad Wataru's a Fangire, asking him to kill Taiga and replace him as the King so they can be together; Wataru also refuses this request. The next day, Shima gives Kengo the order to eliminate Wataru to Keisuke and Megumi's dismay. While Wataru is told about the order on his life and Keisuke apologizing for killing Wataru the next time they meet, Maya is chased down by the Mantis Fangire's gang. With many thoughts running in his head, Wataru arrives to save his mother in Emperor Form with the Zanvat Sword. Once he slays the Mantis Fangire, Kiva is ambushed by Kengo who attacks him as Rising Ixa as Megumi and Keisuke set up from a distance to snipe down their friend with specially-made bullets. The two refuse to do so as Megumi puts down her rifle and Keisuke shoots at Kengo instead, claiming as an accident. Taiga and the Bishop arrive soon thereafter, with the later using his power to awaken the Fangire blood in Wataru, causing Kiva to go berserk and attack his friends as Kengo is pinned down and forced to watch.
40	"Encore: Nago Ixa Explosively Returns"; Transliteration: "Ankōru Nago Ikusa Bakugen" (Japanese: アンコール・名護イクサ爆現)	Hidenori Ishida	Toshiki Inoue	16 November 2008
In 1986, after learning the truth behind Maya and Otoya hiding it from her, Yuri encounters the Fangire queen and resolves to kill her until Otoya tries to stop her. Later, Maya takes Yuri's place in the picnic Otoya planned as she promises not to fight her. When Otoya leave, he is briefly encountered by the King, who witnessed the man's meeting with Maya before he resumes his hunt for the Arms Monsters, offering to spare their lives if they kill Otoya for him. While this occurs, Yuri finally finds Maya and challenges her in Ixa form, with the Fangire managing to defeat her without fighting her. In 2008, after coming to his senses in the aftermath when the Bishop causes his Fangire nature to surface, Wataru runs off in horror of what he almost done to Megumi. After Kengo reports of what occurred, Shima scolds Keisuke as he explains that Wataru's torn heart might do the job of killing the young man for them, though he secretly wants to help Wataru. Taiga, confident that Wataru would fight for him, confronts Shima who attempted to ask him to help him kill Kiva. However, as Keisuke pointed out, the events caused Wataru to relapse back into isolation, even refusing to let Shizuka in as Keisuke arrived. Later, when the Seamoon Fangire attacks, Kengo takes out all his frustration on the Fangire to redeem himself as Ixa's user. However, the Bishop arrives to personally kill Ixa while Wataru ignores the Bloody Rose. But at the last second, Kiva arrives to stop the Swallowtail Fangire from killing Kengo before walking off to resume his isolation with intent to never fight again for the sake of those he cares about. After leading an attempt to storm Wataru's home for a forced intervention on his behalf, Keisuke uses the Ixa Knuckle to battle both the Seamoon Fangire and the Bishop, however Taiga arrives to kill Keisuke while Wataru still ignores the Bloody Rose.
41	"Lullaby: Release the Heart"; Transliteration: "Rarabai Kokoro o Tokihanate" (Japanese: ララバイ・心を解き放て)	Hidenori Ishida	Toshiki Inoue	23 November 2008
In 1986, to save themselves, the Arms Monsters make their attempt to kill Otoya. However, the trio are unable to actually do it to Jiro's shock and decide to leave town and run as fast as they can by taking different paths. However, the King manages to catch up to Ramon and Riki, sealing the two into the Basshaa Magnum and Dogga Hammer so they would serve as decorations in Castle Doran. Later, Yuri attempts to play the Bloody Rose as Maya arrives to tell her not to play, resulting in Yuri using the violin to force Maya to fight her as Ixa. But in Yuri's losing battle with the Pearlshell Fangire is interrupted by the King as Otoya arrives. After Otoya admits that he loves Maya regardless that she's a Fangire, hearing the music of each other's her souls, the King attacks Otoya mercilessly after realizing that Maya had chosen a human over him. But just as the King was about to kill them when Maya ran to Otoya's side, Jiro intervened and the King transforms into Dark Kiva to seal Garulu into the Garulu Saber. Angered to see Jiro sealed, Otoya transforms into Ixa against a tearful Maya's wishes and runs at Dark Kiva with intent to fight him to the death. In 2008, after being saved from his near death encounter with Saga by Kengo, whom he learn Shima was testing and saw as a failure. After Shima chides him for trusting Wataru, Keisuke wonders how he and the girls can attempt to reason with Wataru to reconsider his choice to stop being Kiva. But while it seems hopeless with Mio's attempt to convince Wataru to kill Taiga, Wataru is visited by Kengo as he attempts to beg Wataru not to give up and apologizes for his recent behavior. Later that night, Wataru has dream of meeting Maya as she comforts Wataru to believe in himself regardless of his nature and he'll find his music. The next day, the Seamoon Fangire goes on rampage as Keisuke transforms into Rising Ixa to fight the Fangire. But the Bishop interferes. Keisuke fights and defeats the Swallowtail Fangire with a frontflip Ixa Judgement. After seeing the Bishop flee, Keisuke attempts to follow him, only to be stopped by the Seamoon Fangire. Wataru appears, telling Taiga that he will fight the Fangires to protect humans from them as himself, changing into Kiva Emperor Form to fight the Seamoon Fangire. Shocked, an irate Taiga becomes Saga to educate Wataru by calling forth a Mother Sagarc and its offspring to kill the Seamoon Fangire and then have them discipline Kiva. After slaying the giant Sagarcs, Saga and Kiva stare each other down.
42	"The Power of Love: The King's Anger"; Transliteration: "Pawā Obu Rabu Ō no Ikari" (Japanese: パワー・オブ・ラブ・王の怒り)	Kenzo Maihara	Toshiki Inoue	30 November 2008
In 1986, Otoya transforms into Ixa to do battle with Dark Kiva, only to painfully lose as the King takes him prisoner with the intent to personally feed the man to Castle Doran as Maya fakes not caring for it. However, Yuri finds Maya at the church and begs the queen to help her save Otoya after revealing her feelings of love for him. Maya accepts Yuri's offer as she suits up, taking her to the Lost Woods where Castle Doran rests. However, the two women are confronted by the forest's guardian, the Silkmoth Fangire. In 2008, Taiga is distraught with Wataru's choice to fight for the humans, walking off to Wataru's dismay as he points out that they would have to fight each other eventually. As the café, Megumi, Keisuke, and Kengo try to cheer him up as their way of thanking him for not giving up. As Wataru and Kengo renew their friendship, Shima is annoyed as Keisuke tries to convince him that Kiva's an ally. But later that night, as Mio kills another Fangire traitor and confronts Maya that she'll marry Wataru, Shima meets Taiga who accepted his offer to help him with Wataru in spite of their history, only to turn him down as he leaves. While visiting Yuri's grave, Shima is ambushed by the Sungazer Fangire who hospitalizes him as Keisuke and Megumi arrives on the scene. When Wataru visits Shima while he is near death, the man tells him it is his fault that Taiga hates humans and begs Wataru to save him. By then, Taiga arrives and offers to aid Shima. However, though Shima is healthy as an ox thanks to Taiga, strange things are happening to the man while Taiga is met by Mio as she finally takes Taiga's hand in marriage. Later, Megumi and Keisuke pursue the Sungazer Fangire with Shima joining the search for him as well. However, the Fangire manages to knock his two pursuers out with Shima nowhere to be found. When confronted by Kiva in Emperor Form, the Sungazer Fangire flees after Kiva wounds him as Saga interferes with intent to force Kiva into submission after he refuses his final offer. As this fight occurs, the Sungazer Fangire runs off until he reverts to Shima, both confused and horrified of what he has become.
43	"Wedding march: Time of Parting"; Transliteration: "Kekkon Kōshinkyoku Wakare no Toki" (Japanese: 結婚行進曲・別れの時)	Kenzo Maihara	Toshiki Inoue	7 December 2008
In 1986, after Yuri loses to the godly Silkworm Fangire, Maya forces the forest guardian back into her stone form with Yuri annoyed about being saved by a Fangire. The two women resume their search for Otoya, whose Life Energy is being sucked out of him with Kivat-bat the 2nd keeping an eye on him. Otoya pleads with Kivat-bat the 2nd, making his final request to play his violin one last time. Using the violin music as a beacon, Maya and Yuri manage to make it in time as Maya and the King fight each other. While the escaping Otoya and Yuri are encountered by the Silkworm Fangire which Otoya destroys with the Ixa system, Dark Kiva defeats the Pearlshell Fangire as she finally admits that she does love Otoya, forcing the King to strip Maya of her Fangire title and powers as punishment for her betrayal. In 2008, Saga nearly kills Kiva but stops their fight due his younger brother being unable to fight back seriously. Shima, keeping what happened to him a secret, assigns Wataru to be his bodyguard against the Sungazer Fangire the Fangire Hunters presumed are hunting down. However, while on a jog, Shima suddenly runs off and becomes the Sungazer Fangire with Keisuke fighting him as Rising Ixa, exposing him as Shima, leaving everyone confused as he runs off. Confronting Taiga as Shima arrives, Wataru learns that Taiga saved his life by transplanting into the man's body a bit of Fangire power. Making a visit to the café, Shima is found by Keisuke who attempts to kill him on command, but couldn't do it. The next day, Shima apologizes to Wataru for his mistrust before running off as the Fangire power that's to manifest. Elsewhere, Taiga and Mio begin the Fangire marriage ritual until Mio attempts to kill him. The Bishop blocks her path until ordered to let her go while denying her intent to kill him. Taiga later finds Shima as he finally got used to his Fangire body. Attempting to kill him, Shima is shattered by Saga, provoking Wataru in fighting his brother without restraint as Mio and the Bishop watch the half brothers' battle from afar. Kiva has the upper hand over Saga until Mio intervenes at the last second and receives the Emperor Moon Break intended for Saga. Finding Mio near death, Wataru receives the ring he gave her and places it on her finger before she crystallizes and shatters in his arms.
44	"Punk: Back to Father"; Transliteration: "Panku Bakku Tu Fāzā" (Japanese: パンク・バックトゥ・ファーザー)	Takao Nagaishi	Toshiki Inoue	14 December 2008
In 2008, in the aftermath of Mio's death from her interference between the battle between Saga and Kiva, a devastated Wataru confronts an enraged Taiga until Jiro intervenes, taking him to the Time Door in hopes that the young man may regain his composure by visiting the past to help the ones there. However, Wataru decides to use this to alter the past by keeping Otoya and Maya apart, negating his own existence and thus saving Mio's life. Meanwhile, as a heartbroken Taiga vows that he will kill Wataru for taking Mio from him, Keisuke takes over the Blue Sky Organization for Shima's sake. Keisuke later runs into Bishop who sees him as the only remaining threat to the Fangire, defeating the Swallowtail Fangire as Rising Ixa before he escapes. In 1986, after being saved from the King by Yuri and Maya, Otoya leaves his hospital to save the Arms Monsters. However, Wataru in the guise of a doctor, advises him to stay in bed for a year. When that fails, Wataru assumes the guise of an old fortune teller, and warns Otoya that his life is in danger if he meets Maya, but he still does not believe it and recognizes him before Wataru is forced to run for it. When Yuri starts moving out of Otoya's house, she encounters Wataru as he tells her to express her feelings for Otoya, but she uses the date Wataru setup for her to end it properly between them. Later, the powerless Maya is targeted by the Polar Bear Fangire until Yuri saves her as Otoya arrives and she sets them up to Wataru's dismay, forced to reveal that he is Maya's and Otoya's child. Otoya still does not believe it and sees it as a Fangire plot, even after Wataru reveals the button he got from his mother. Once in his father's house, Wataru manages to convince Otoya that he is his son but not to help him. Wataru later is visited by Maya as the Polar Bear Fangire returns, when Kivat and Tatsulot arrive. They hold off the monster's attack, giving Maya the chance to escape. However, as Wataru attempts to steal the Bloody Rose from Otoya to keep him from his date with Maya, the Polar Bear Fangire arrives to kill him for meddling as Wataru becomes Kiva Emperor Form with Kivat-bat the 2nd watching the change with Otoya joining in the fight as Ixa. After the father/son team shatters the Polar Bear Fangire, the two start to fight each other since Otoya was going to see Maya against Wataru's will until the King arrives with an interest in the future Kiva, offering to help him by killing Otoya as Dark Kiva.
45	"With You: Final Transformation"; Transliteration: "Wizu Yū Saigo no Henshin" (Japanese: ウィズユー・最後の変身)	Takao Nagaishi	Toshiki Inoue	21 December 2008
In 1986, during their brief encounter with Dark Kiva, Otoya is rescued by Wataru from the grips of King, only to invoke his wrath and reveal his true form as the Bat Fangire. Escaping the monster and later Wataru, Otoya encounters Kivat-bat the 2nd who delivers a message from Maya telling them they cannot meet again. She reveals that the King is using their son Taiga as leverage against her, vowing to kill the baby if she ever comes in contact with Otoya again. In light of his nemesis' cruel methods, Otoya offers to rescue Taiga; an equally disgusted Kivat-bat the 2nd proposes to enter a pact with him that would allow Otoya to use the power of Kiva, even though it would endanger the man's life. Wataru, who overhears the discussion, is requested by Maya to save Taiga; however, Otoya refuses to let Wataru something he wants to do. Overwhelmed by the situation, Wataru excuses himself only to encounter King, escalating into full-blown combat between the two Kivas, until Otoya arrives. The situation soon turns dire as Wataru is injured intercepting an attack meant for his father. Facing imminent danger, Otoya enters the pact with Kivat-bat the 2nd and becomes Dark Kiva and forces the King to retreat. With the Bat Fangire gone, Otoya is left to brave the pains of his pact, knocking Wataru unconscious. Found by Yuri, she offers advice to Wataru not to continue his plan as it would mean Mio would never know him. Finding Maya, Wataru learns that Otoya is making a rescue attempt to Castle Doran to save the Arms Monsters and Taiga. Once inside Castle Doran, Otoya manages to free the Arms Monsters, but he is discovered by King. Narrowly escaping, Wataru meets with Otoya in the manor's halls and is told the only way to honor Mio is to live a strong life for her. When the King finds them, Otoya covers for Wataru to find Taiga as he transforms into Dark Kiva to fight the Bat Fangire, freeing the Arms Monsters in the process. The Bat Fangire summons a red Sabbat to control Castle Doran, but Wataru assumes Emperor Form to free the dragon from the creature. Meanwhile, the battle between Otoya and the Bat Fangire reaches its climax as Otoya collapses from the strain of Kiva's power. In 2008, Taiga agonizes over his loss of Mio, with the Bishop only offering harsh words about his King's treasonous fiancée's actions against their race, before revealing himself as Mio's true executioner and had allowed Wataru to take the blame so he would be too distraught to interfere in their affairs again. However, in spite of the Bishop's confidence that their kind would be unchallenged, Taiga turns his wrath towards him in a violent rage from which the Bishop barely escapes with his life. This act angers the Bishop as he starts attacking human to gather the necessary life energy to exact his revenge against Taiga for his unkingly behavior, only to be interrupted by Keisuke as he assumes Rising Ixa to stop the Swallowtail Fangire.
46	"Full stop: Farewell, Otoya"; Transliteration: "Shūshifu Saraba Otoya" (Japanese: 終止符・さらば音也)	Hidenori Ishida	Toshiki Inoue	4 January 2009
In 1986, after seeing his father hurt, Wataru battles the Bat Fangire as Kiva and loses to him. Enraged, Otoya uses the Ixa System to take on the King. After his father loses as Ixa and the Ixa Knuckle ends up in the river, Wataru continues the fight until Otoya becomes Dark Kiva despite Wataru and Maya's pleas. The two Kivas battle the Bat Fangire together with a terrified Maya watching. At first the King has the upper hand of the Kivas. But after realizing his father's passion and embracing his father's ideology, Wataru and his father defeat the King with a double Rider Kick. The wounded King attempts to kill Maya and Taiga before he dies, only for his attack to be reflected back at him by the infant. The King realizes that the title has changed hands, and vows that Taiga would avenge him before shattering to pieces. After the battle was over, Wataru begins to fade back into 2009, but not before a dying Otoya gives him final advice to make his own choices for a better tomorrow. Later, Otoya visits Yuri while she is looking for Buruman, asking her to teach him how to make an omrice and expressing his gratitude in having met her. He then finds the Arms Monsters with the masterless Castle Doran as they decide to enter the beast to keep it from causing trouble, asking the trio to do him a favor for everything he did for them by having them promise to protect his future son, Wataru. He spends the end of the afternoon on a final date with Maya, playing her favorite song on the Bloody Rose before ultimately dying in her arms. In 2008, a saddened Wataru returns, taking his father's words to heart and becomes a new person from it. At the Cafe mal'damour, Keisuke tries to convince Megumi to officially back him as the new president of the Wonderful Blue Sky Organization to her annoyance. Elsewhere, the Bishop has started his revenge coup, reviving an entire army of Fangires with the Life Energy he amassed to attack the populace and gather even more Life Energy needed for his plan to succeed. Wataru charges into battle, rescuing Shizuka from a Warthog Fangire as himself. Upon seeing Wataru's face, the Fangire runs off in fear. While talking to Shizuka who was amazed by his new outlook, Wataru notices two Fangires in human form and follow them as they attack Keisuke and Megumi while the two at odds; the Moose Fangire runs off in fear after seeing him. Keisuke manages to slay the Horsefly Fangire as Rising Ixa before running into the Bishop, who assumes his Fangire form as the two decide to finally settle things. Megumi intervenes and is nearly killed, but Keisuke manages to take the blow in her place, severely injuring him with the blow causing him to gradually lose his eyesight. At Mio's grave site, Taiga and Wataru encounter each other as they pay their respects before the two transform and battle each other to finish what they started. However, their battle is interrupted by the Bishop's small Fangire squad ambushing the two, with the Bishop leaving Taiga with an ominous revelation that he will be replaced by more ideal King of his own creation.
47	"Break the Chain: Obey Me!"; Transliteration: "Bureiku Za Chēn Ware ni Shitagae!" (Japanese: ブレイク・ザ・チェーン・我に従え！)	Hidenori Ishida	Toshiki Inoue	11 January 2009
In the present day (2009), Taiga and Wataru resume their battle to the death upon dispensing of the Fangires that the Bishop had revived. The two battle each other in both Rider and human forms; Wataru overpowers Taiga before walking off, tired of fighting him and telling him he will embrace his Fangire nature but not to help his older brother. As the Bishop has his Fangire army gather more Life Energy by the masses, Wataru helps Keisuke in supporting Megumi from a Fangire attack until they get unexpected support from Shima. After Shima reveals Keisuke's condition, Keisuke accepts the notion of resigning from the Wonderful Blue Sky Organization to Megumi's dismay as she offers to help him. Meanwhile, after losing his position as D&P's president due to his defeat by Kiva, a ruined Taiga later encounters the Bishop, who attempts to kill him with the aid of his minions. Keisuke and Megumi arrive to aid him with Megumi giving directions to Keisuke as to where to attack, but all three are defeated as Wataru arrives. He slays all the Fangires as Kiva, declaring himself as the Fangire King to everyone's shock. The Bishop is most offended by this and attempts an attack on Kiva, but is easily driven off as Taiga's mind snaps. Wataru later meets Shima who reveals that Taiga pretended to kill him and took him away to purge the Fangire energy from his body while being healed implying that Taiga had a degree of kindness within him. Elsewhere, a distraught Taiga demands the power of Dark Kiva from Maya; she refuses and Taiga seeming kills her out of rage to obtain the power of Dark Kiva to regain his title and birthright. As Wataru takes the throne of King to the Arms Monsters' dismay, Bishop is close to resurrecting the previous King, the Bat Fangire.
48	"Finale: The Inheritors of Kiva"; Transliteration: "Fināre Kiba o Tsugu Mono" (Japanese: フィナーレ・キバを継ぐ者)	Hidenori Ishida	Toshiki Inoue	18 January 2009
After Wataru has proclaimed himself the new King of the Fangires, Taiga confronts him and claims to have killed their mother to acquire the powers of Dark Kiva. This drives Wataru to attack his half-brother, only to be interrupted by the Bishop and his new army of revived Fangires. With the Arms Monsters' aid, the Kivas dispatch of the Fangires before resuming their fight as the Bishop is stopped from meddling by Keisuke, who trained with Megumi to perfect their teamwork. As Rising Ixa, Keisuke initially is disadvantaged against the Swallowtail Fangire until his drive to succeed allows him to mortally wound the Fangire while regaining his vision. Though dying, the Bishop uses his own soul to complete the Bat Fangire's rebirth. While this occurred, Shima arrives and reveals to Taiga that Wataru took the title of King to save him from being a target. But the Bat Fangire uses this moment to attack, easily beating the two Kivas single-handedly before throwing Wataru off a cliff. However, Wataru is saved by Otoya's spirit, telling his son that he lives on within him and not to give up. This encourages Wataru to muster the strength as he and Taiga combine their signature attacks to destroy the former King once and for all. Though the battle ended, Wataru and Taiga get a surprise visit by Maya, who revealed she was only knocked unconscious by Taiga. The reunion ends with the two brothers resuming their fight to determine who will be the new King. A few days later, as Taiga returns to D&P to begin a new venture to find an alternate means for the Fangire race to survive, Wataru attends Megumi's wedding to Keisuke. Just as Wataru prepares to play his violin for the newly weds, a young man resembling Otoya bursts into the reception. Calling himself Masao, he claims to be Wataru's son from 22 years in the future. He has come to get Wataru to help him fight the Neo-Fangire menace who have started to appear in 2009, showing up as a vortex in the sky above the church as Taiga arrives to the wedding late. Wataru, Keisuke, Taiga, Masao, Jiro, Ramon, and Riki transform into Emperor Form, Rising Ixa, Dark Kiva, Kiva Form, Garulu, Basshaa, and Dogga to face this new threat.
