= Tourbillon (band) =

Musical group

- Origin: Japan
- Genres: Pop rock; alternative rock
- Years active: 2005–2008; 2015–2016; 2023; 2025
- Label: Avex Trax
- Members: Ryuichi Kawamura; Inoran; H. Hayama
- Website: Official site

Tourbillon (Japanese: トゥールビヨン, Hepburn: Tūrubiyon; French for "whirlwind") are a Japanese rock trio formed in 2005 by Luna Sea members Ryuichi Kawamura (vocals) and Inoran (guitar), and D-Loop member Hiroaki "H. Hayama" Hayama (keyboards). They reached number three on the Oricon Singles Chart with "Break the Chain", the opening theme of the TV series Kamen Rider Kiva. The group ended activities in 2008 shortly after its release. Tourbillon reunited in 2015, and again in 2023.

== History ==
Although their band Luna Sea had disbanded in 2000, vocalist Ryuichi Kawamura and guitarist Inoran kept in touch and talked about doing something together again someday. In October 2003, supported by D-Loop keyboardist Hiroaki "H. Hayama" Hayama, the two performed covers together at a 20th anniversary concert for Aion at Shibuya La Mama. The three musicians announced the formation of Tourbillon in May 2005. The announcement included the date of their first official concert to be held at the Nippon Budokan on July 2, 2005. The 10,000 tickets sold-out immediately. For the show, they were supported by Masami Tsuchiya on guitar, Tokie (Rize) on bass, Masayuki Muraishi on drums, and Yukarie (The Thrill) on saxophone. Tourbillon's first single, "Heaven", was released on September 7. It was followed by the release of "Your Place" on October 5, 2005. Third single "Mouichido Kimi ni" was released on November 2 and used as the theme to the anime film Black Jack: The Two Doctors of Darkness. Their first album Heaven followed on November 30, and was supported by their first tour of 12 performances throughout December. "Ageha/Selfish", the band's first double A-side single, was released on August 2, 2006. Tourbillon's second album, A Tide of New Era, was released on November 8. Their fifth single "Break the Chain" was released on March 26, 2008 and used as the opening theme song of the TV series Kamen Rider Kiva.

Tourbillon reunited for a 10th anniversary concert at the Tokyo International Forum on November 27, 2015, and a three-date tour at different Zepp venues throughout December. The compilation album The Decade - 10th Anniversary Best was previously released on November 25, and includes three new songs. One of these new songs, "Colorless Images", was released as a single on February 24, 2016, and used as the theme song of Kamen Rider: Battride War Genesis. The band's third studio album, Life Is Beautiful, followed on October 12 and was supported by a four-date Zepp tour that month. Tsuchiya, Tokie and Yukarie returned as support musicians for the tour, with Takashi Numazawa (Theatre Brook) on drums.

In 2023, Ryuichi, Inoran and Hayama reunited again to celebrate Tourbillon's 20th anniversary. They held two concerts, titled 20 Years Since Time Began, on August 5 and 25 at Zepp Haneda, and released the new song "I'm Going to Love" digitally on August 26. The 20th anniversary continued with the release of Tourbillon's fourth studio album, Boundless, on June 18, 2025, and a three-date Zepp tour in June and July. Their supporting band included Yukarie, Numazawa, Yuya Komoguchi (Trix) on guitar, Tomoko Nakanishi (Allergy) on bass and Yumi Kawamura as a backup singer.

== Discography ==
=== Albums ===
- Heaven (November 30, 2005), Oricon Albums Chart Peak Position: #13
- A Tide of New Era (November 8, 2006) #15
- The Decade - 10th Anniversary Best (November 25, 2015, compilation album) #39
- Life Is Beautiful (October 12, 2016) #25
- Boundless (June 18, 2025) #19

=== Singles ===
- "Heaven" (September 7, 2005), Oricon Singles Chart Peak Position: #12
- "Your Place" (October 5, 2005) #13
- "Mouichido Kimi ni" (もう一度君に; November 2, 2005) #15

Theme song of the anime film Black Jack: The Two Doctors of Darkness.

- "Ageha/Selfish" (アゲハ/selfish; August 2, 2006) #21
- "Break the Chain" (March 26, 2008) #3

The theme song for the TV series Kamen Rider Kiva.

- "Colorless Images" (February 24, 2016) #61

The theme song for the video game Kamen Rider: Battride War Genesis.

=== Home videos ===
- Frame of Heaven (March 23, 2006), Oricon DVDs Chart Peak Position: #45
- 10th Anniversary Tour 2015 in Zepp Tokyo (March 23, 2016) #132
