= Kamen Rider Kiva =

Japanese TV series

- Also known as: Masked Rider Kiva
- Genre: Tokusatsu; Superhero fiction; Supernatural; Gothic fiction; Dark fantasy
- Created by: Shotaro Ishinomori
- Written by: Toshiki Inoue; Shōji Yonemura
- Directed by: Ryuta Tasaki; Hidenori Ishida; Kenzo Maihara; Naoki Tamura; Takao Nagaishi; Shojiro Nakazawa
- Starring: Kōji Seto; Kouhei Takeda; Keisuke Kato; Rina Koike; Nana Yanagisawa; Yu Takahashi; Shouma Yamamoto; Kazuhiko Kanayama; Houka Kinoshita; Kenji Matsuda; Yuuki Ogoe; Eiji Takigawa; Yuria Haga; Mitsu Murata; Saki Kagami; Kohei Kumai; Shinya Niiro; Tomohide Takahara
- Voices of: Tomokazu Sugita
- Narrated by: Tomokazu Sugita; Akira Ishida (30–48)
- Theme music composer: Shuhei Naruse
- Opening theme: "Break the Chain" by Tourbillon
- Composer: Tsuneyoshi Saito
- Country of origin: Japan
- No. of episodes: 48 (list of episodes)

Production
- Producers: Atsushi Kaji (TV Asahi); Naomi Takebe (Toei); Takaaki Utsunomiya (Toei); Takahito Ōmori (Toei)
- Running time: 20–25 minutes
- Production companies: Toei Company; Ishimori Productions; TV Asahi Corporation; Asatsu-DK

Original release
- Network: TV Asahi
- Release: January 27, 2008 – January 18, 2009

Related
- Kamen Rider Den-O; Kamen Rider Decade

Kamen Rider Kiva (仮面ライダーキバ, Kamen Raidā Kiba) (Note: Kiva (キバ, Kiba) is an abrreviation for "King of Vampire". It also translates from the word kiba (牙, "fang").) is the 2008 Kamen Rider Japanese tokusatsu television series produced by Toei Company and Ishimori Productions. It is the series' ninth series in its Heisei era, and 18th series overall since the debut of Kamen Rider in 1971. It premiered on January 27, 2008, following Kamen Rider Den-O's finale, and aired as a part of TV Asahi's 2008 Super Hero Time block with Engine Sentai Go-onger. The series was advertised to have horror film themes, such as Kamen Rider Kiva being a vampire. The first episode began with a commemoration of the series in honor of the seventieth anniversary of Shotaro Ishinomori's birthday.

== Synopsis ==
22 years after the disappearance of his father, Wataru Kurenai lives in an infamous "haunted house" where he is destined as Kamen Rider Kiva to fight Fangires, a species of life force-draining vampires who can assume stained glass-like monster bodies that his father fought years ago before his disappearance. He also deals with Kamen Rider Ixa, who is part of an organization seeking to destroy the Fangire menace, and Kamen Rider Saga, Wataru's half-brother who later becomes the present-day Kamen Rider Dark Kiva in the finale. The story is split between Wataru in the present (2008–09) and his father Otoya in the past (1986–87), slowly revealing the link between the Fangire race and Kiva.

The characters of Kamen Rider Kiva are found in two related periods where the heroes fight the Fangires and protect a few of them who are non-hostile:

- From 1986 until 1987, Otoya Kurenai, Fangire Hunter Yuri Aso, and the three respective sole surviving monster races who will become Wataru's familiars (Jiro the Wolfen, Ramon the Merman, and Riki the Franken) use Kamen Rider Ixa Ver. I system to fight against the newly-born Fangires, while also being able to redeem a few of them to live with humanity, such as the former Fangire Queen, Maya. Following the defection of Kivat III's father Kivat II from the Fangire King, the original Dark Kiva, Otoya sacrifices his life by transforming himself into the second Dark Kiva to destroy the misanthropist Fangire leader.
- From 2008 until 2009, Otoya's son Wataru (as Kamen Rider Kiva), Keisuke Nago (as Kamen Rider Ixa Ver. X), and Yuri's daughter Megumi (also a Fangire Hunter), as well as their new and old allies fight against the remaining hostile Fangires, including the resurrected Fangire King. After being joined by their former enemy Taiga Nobori, Wataru's half-brother at the finale, the Fangire King is permanently destroyed and the heroes maintain peace between human and non-human races aside from the surviving non-hostile Fangires, followed by Keisuke and Megumi's marriage.

== Episodes ==
Each episode's title is a word or phrase relating to music and a phrase describing the episode separated by a symbol from musical notation. For example, the second episode's title is written in Japanese as "組曲♪親子のバイオリン". From episode 2 onward, Kivat begins the majority of episodes by stating a piece of trivia about music, art, chess, and other subjects. From episode 30 onward, Tatsulot joins the opening statement as he and Kivat provide recaps of the previous episode.

No.	Title	Directed by	Written by	Original release date
1	"Fate: Wake Up!"; Transliteration: "Unmei Weiku Appu!" (Japanese: 運命・ウェイクアップ！)	Ryuta Tasaki	Toshiki Inoue	27 January 2008
2	"Suite: Father/Son Violin"; Transliteration: "Kumikyoku Oyako no Baiorin" (Japanese: 組曲・親子のバイオリン)	Ryuta Tasaki	Toshiki Inoue	3 February 2008
3	"Heroic: Perfect Hunter"; Transliteration: "Eiyū Pāfekuto Hantā" (Japanese: 英雄・パーフェクトハンター)	Hidenori Ishida	Toshiki Inoue	10 February 2008
4	"Reverie: Wild Blue"; Transliteration: "Musō Wairudo Burū" (Japanese: 夢想・ワイルドブルー)	Hidenori Ishida	Toshiki Inoue	17 February 2008
5	"Duet: Stalker Panic"; Transliteration: "Nijūsō Sutōkā Panikku" (Japanese: 二重奏・ストーカーパニック)	Kenzo Maihara	Toshiki Inoue	24 February 2008
6	"Replay: Humans Are All Music"; Transliteration: "Ripurei Ningen wa Minna Ongaku" (Japanese: リプレイ・人間はみんな音楽)	Kenzo Maihara	Toshiki Inoue	2 March 2008
7	"Hymn: Three Star Full Course of Darkness"; Transliteration: "Sanka Mitsuboshi Yami no Furu Kōsu" (Japanese: 讃歌・三ツ星闇のフルコース)	Ryuta Tasaki	Toshiki Inoue	9 March 2008
8	"Soul: The Angered Dragon Castle"; Transliteration: "Sōru Doragon-jō, Ikaru" (Japanese: ソウル・ドラゴン城、怒る)	Ryuta Tasaki	Toshiki Inoue	16 March 2008
9	"Symphony: Ixa, Fist On"; Transliteration: "Kōkyō Ikusa, Fisuto On" (Japanese: 交響・イクサ・フィストオン)	Hidenori Ishida	Toshiki Inoue	23 March 2008
10	"Sabre Dance: Glassy Melody"; Transliteration: "Tsurugi no Mai Garasu no Merodi" (Japanese: 剣の舞・硝子のメロディ)	Hidenori Ishida	Toshiki Inoue	30 March 2008
11	"Rolling Stone: Door of Dreams"; Transliteration: "Rōringu Sutōn Yume no Tobira" (Japanese: ローリングストーン・夢の扉)	Kenzo Maihara	Toshiki Inoue	6 April 2008
12	"First Live: Golden Speed"; Transliteration: "Hatsu Raibu Ōgon no Supīdo" (Japanese: 初ライブ・黄金のスピード)	Kenzo Maihara	Toshiki Inoue	13 April 2008
13	"Unfinished: Daddy Fight"; Transliteration: "Mikansei Dadi Faito" (Japanese: 未完成・ダディ・ファイト)	Naoki Tamura	Toshiki Inoue	20 April 2008
14	"Pomp and Circumstance: Thunderstrike Purple Eye"; Transliteration: "Ifūdōdō Raigeki Pāpuru Ai" (Japanese: 威風堂々・雷撃パープルアイ)	Naoki Tamura	Toshiki Inoue	27 April 2008
15	"Resurrection: Checkmate Four"; Transliteration: "Fukkatsu Chekkumeito Fō" (Japanese: 復活・チェックメイトフォー)	Takao Nagaishi	Toshiki Inoue	4 May 2008
16	"Player: The Rules of Cruelty"; Transliteration: "Pureiyā Hijō no Rūru" (Japanese: プレイヤー・非情のルール)	Takao Nagaishi	Toshiki Inoue	11 May 2008
17	"Lesson: My Way"; Transliteration: "Ressun Mai Wei" (Japanese: レッスン・マイウェイ)	Hidenori Ishida	Shōji Yonemura	18 May 2008
18	"Quartet: Listen to Your Heart's Voice"; Transliteration: "Karutetto Kokoro no Koe o Kike" (Japanese: カルテット・心の声を聴け)	Hidenori Ishida	Shōji Yonemura	25 May 2008
19	"Fusion: Aura Storm"; Transliteration: "Fyūjon Ōra no Arashi" (Japanese: フュージョン・オーラの嵐)	Kenzo Maihara	Toshiki Inoue	1 June 2008
20	"Nocturne: The Lovely Messiah"; Transliteration: "Yasōkyoku Ai no Kyūseishu" (Japanese: 夜想曲・愛の救世主)	Kenzo Maihara	Toshiki Inoue	8 June 2008
21	"Rhapsody: The Fate of the Ring"; Transliteration: "Rapusodī Yubiwa no Yukue" (Japanese: ラプソディー・指輪の行方)	Takao Nagaishi	Toshiki Inoue	22 June 2008
22	"Overture: Fateful Intersection"; Transliteration: "Jokyoku Unmei no Kōsaten" (Japanese: 序曲・運命の交差点)	Takao Nagaishi	Toshiki Inoue	29 June 2008
23	"Variation: Fugitives Forever"; Transliteration: "Hensōkyoku Eien no Tōbōsha" (Japanese: 変奏曲・永遠の逃亡者)	Hidenori Ishida	Toshiki Inoue	6 July 2008
24	"Emperor: Golden Fever"; Transliteration: "Kōtei Gōruden Fībā" (Japanese: 皇帝・ゴールデンフィーバー)	Hidenori Ishida	Toshiki Inoue	13 July 2008
25	"Fanfare: The Queen's Awakening"; Transliteration: "Fanfāre Joō no Mezame" (Japanese: ファンファーレ・女王の目醒め)	Shojiro Nakazawa	Toshiki Inoue	20 July 2008
26	"Metronome: Miraculous Memory"; Transliteration: "Metoronōmu Kioku no Kiseki" (Japanese: メトロノーム・記憶のキセキ)	Shojiro Nakazawa	Toshiki Inoue	27 July 2008
27	"80's: Angry Rising Blue"; Transliteration: "Eitīzu Ikareru Raijingu Burū" (Japanese: 80's・怒れるライジングブルー)	Takao Nagaishi	Toshiki Inoue	3 August 2008
28	"Request: Time-Altering Battle"; Transliteration: "Rikuesuto Toki o Kaeru Tatakai" (Japanese: リクエスト・時を変える戦い)	Takao Nagaishi	Toshiki Inoue	17 August 2008
29	"When the Saints Go Marching In: I Am King"; Transliteration: "Seija no Kōshin Ware koso Kingu" (Japanese: 聖者の行進・我こそキング)	Hidenori Ishida	Toshiki Inoue	24 August 2008
30	"Curtain Raising: Kiva's Identity"; Transliteration: "Kaien Kiba no Shōtai" (Japanese: 開演・キバの正体)	Hidenori Ishida	Toshiki Inoue	31 August 2008
31	"Applause: Motherly Dedicated Transformation"; Transliteration: "Kassai Haha ni Sasageru Henshin" (Japanese: 喝采・母に捧げる変身)	Hidenori Ishida	Toshiki Inoue	7 September 2008
32	"New World: Another Kiva"; Transliteration: "Shinsekai Mō Hitori no Kiba" (Japanese: 新世界・もう一人のキバ)	Ryuta Tasaki	Toshiki Inoue	14 September 2008
33	"Supersonic: Saga's Fight"; Transliteration: "Sūpāsonikku Tatakai no Saga" (Japanese: スーパーソニック・闘いのサガ)	Ryuta Tasaki	Toshiki Inoue	21 September 2008
34	"Noise: Melody of Destruction"; Transliteration: "Noizu Hakai no Senritsu" (Japanese: ノイズ・破壊の旋律)	Takao Nagaishi	Toshiki Inoue	28 September 2008
35	"New Arrangement: Flying Rose"; Transliteration: "Nyū Arenji Hishō no Bara" (Japanese: ニューアレンジ･飛翔のバラ)	Takao Nagaishi	Toshiki Inoue	5 October 2008
36	"Revolution: Sword Legend"; Transliteration: "Kakumei Sōdo Rejendo" (Japanese: 革命・ソードレジェンド)	Shojiro Nakazawa	Toshiki Inoue	12 October 2008
37	"Triangle: Behead the King"; Transliteration: "Toraianguru Kingu ga Kiru" (Japanese: トライアングル・キングが斬る)	Shojiro Nakazawa	Toshiki Inoue	19 October 2008
38	"Erlking: Mother and Child Reunion"; Transliteration: "Maō Haha to Ko no Saikai" (Japanese: 魔王・母と子の再会)	Ryuta Tasaki	Toshiki Inoue	26 October 2008
39	"Shout: Targeted Brother"; Transliteration: "Shauto Nerawareta Kyōdai" (Japanese: シャウト・狙われた兄弟)	Ryuta Tasaki	Toshiki Inoue	9 November 2008
40	"Encore: Nago Ixa Explosively Returns"; Transliteration: "Ankōru Nago Ikusa Bakugen" (Japanese: アンコール・名護イクサ爆現)	Hidenori Ishida	Toshiki Inoue	16 November 2008
41	"Lullaby: Release the Heart"; Transliteration: "Rarabai Kokoro o Tokihanate" (Japanese: ララバイ・心を解き放て)	Hidenori Ishida	Toshiki Inoue	23 November 2008
42	"The Power of Love: The King's Anger"; Transliteration: "Pawā Obu Rabu Ō no Ikari" (Japanese: パワー・オブ・ラブ・王の怒り)	Kenzo Maihara	Toshiki Inoue	30 November 2008
43	"Wedding march: Time of Parting"; Transliteration: "Kekkon Kōshinkyoku Wakare no Toki" (Japanese: 結婚行進曲・別れの時)	Kenzo Maihara	Toshiki Inoue	7 December 2008
44	"Punk: Back to Father"; Transliteration: "Panku Bakku Tu Fāzā" (Japanese: パンク・バックトゥ・ファーザー)	Takao Nagaishi	Toshiki Inoue	14 December 2008
45	"With You: Final Transformation"; Transliteration: "Wizu Yū Saigo no Henshin" (Japanese: ウィズユー・最後の変身)	Takao Nagaishi	Toshiki Inoue	21 December 2008
46	"Full stop: Farewell, Otoya"; Transliteration: "Shūshifu Saraba Otoya" (Japanese: 終止符・さらば音也)	Hidenori Ishida	Toshiki Inoue	4 January 2009
47	"Break the Chain: Obey Me!"; Transliteration: "Bureiku Za Chēn Ware ni Shitagae!" (Japanese: ブレイク・ザ・チェーン・我に従え！)	Hidenori Ishida	Toshiki Inoue	11 January 2009
48	"Finale: The Inheritors of Kiva"; Transliteration: "Fināre Kiba o Tsugu Mono" (Japanese: フィナーレ・キバを継ぐ者)	Hidenori Ishida	Toshiki Inoue	18 January 2009

== Films ==
=== Climax Deka ===
A movie titled Kamen Rider Den-O & Kiva the Movie: Climax Deka (劇場版 仮面ライダー電王&キバ クライマックス刑事（デカ）, Gekijōban Kamen Raidā Den'ō Ando Kiba Kuraimakkusu Deka) opened in theaters on April 12, 2008. It is a crossover between the characters of Kiva and Kamen Rider Den-O, who join forces to fight a new evil Imagin who has teamed up with the Fangire Clan. Alongside Climax Deka, a short film titled Momotaros's Let's Go Kiva! (モモタロスのキバっていくぜ！, Momotarosu no Kibatte Ikuze!) was shown as a double feature.

=== King of the Castle in the Demon World ===
Kamen Rider Kiva the Movie: King of the Castle in the Demon World (劇場版 仮面ライダーキバ 魔界城の王, Gekijōban Kamen Raidā Kiba Makaijō no Ō) opened in Japanese theaters on August 9, 2008, and was double-billed with Engine Sentai Go-onger: Boom Boom! Bang Bang! GekijōBang!!. It featured two new Riders who have been shown in silhouettes in Japanese children's magazines: Kamen Rider Rey (仮面ライダーレイ, Kamen Raidā Rei), who is a monster hunter named Takato Shiramine (白峰 天斗, Shiramine Takato) portrayed by Shouma Yamamoto, and is partnered Rey Kivat (レイキバット, Rei Kibatto; voiced by Norio Wakamoto). The villain of the movie is Takashi Sugimura (杉村 隆, Sugimura Takashi) portrayed by Ken Horiuchi of the comedy troupe Neptune, a death-row inmate who transforms into Kamen Rider Arc (仮面ライダーアーク, Kamen Raidā Āku) with Arc Kivat (アークキバット, Āku Kibatto; voiced by Norio Wakamoto). The movie takes place in an alternate universe, as trying to place the story of the movie anywhere within the story of the series always leaves events out of place and would cancel out other events. Furthermore, Shouma Yamamoto portrays Takato Shiramine in the Kamen Rider Kiva movie, but he also portrays Taiga Nobori in the actual series.

== "Den-Liner, Into Space!" ==
"Kamen Rider Kiva & Den-O: Den-Liner, Into Space!" (仮面ライダーキバ&電王 デンライナー、宇宙へ！, Kamen Raidā Kiba Ando Den'ō Denrainā, Uchū e!) is a planetarium show that featured the cast of Kiva and Den-O to teach children about the universe. It was shown at the Kagoshima Municipal Science Hall's planetarium between January 2 and March 30, 2009.

== Adventure Battle DVD ==
In the Hyper Battle DVD Kamen Rider Kiva: You Can Also Be Kiva (仮面ライダーキバ キミもキバになろう, Kamen Raidā Kiba Kimi mo Kiba ni Narō), Wataru Kurenai, Keisuke Nago, and Otoya Kurenai introduce themselves to a boy (the viewer) who has wandered into the Café mald'amour and offer to teach him how he can be like each of them. This DVD is referred to as an Adventure Battle DVD (アドベンチャーバトルDVD, Adobenchā Batoru Dī Bui Dī) and it takes on the form of a Choose Your Own Adventure story. After having an "Ixa-cise" with Nago and a special lesson from Otoya, a Fangire attacks and the viewer can choose to transform Kiva into Garulu Form, Basshaa Form, Dogga Form, or the secret DoGaBaKi Emperor Form.

== Production ==
The Kamen Rider Kiva trademark was registered by Toei on October 10, 2007.

== King of Vampire ==
Kiva's S.I.C. Hero Saga side story Masked Rider Kiva: King of Vampire (MASKED RIDER KIVA -KING OF VAMPIRE-) follows the life of the characters after the finale while expanding on moments in the history of the 1986 storyline. The story had begun running in the January 2010 issue of Monthly Hobby Japan magazine. Like the series' episode titles, the titles of the first three chapters of the S.I.C. Hero Saga follow a similar format, but feature two musically themed titles separated by an item from musical notation (the former is an opera while the latter is a song from said opera, the third names the composer and one of his songs). The last chapter is a retelling of the final scene of the TV series, except instead of Masao and the Neo-Fangires, Kiva-la comes to warn them about the Lion Fangire having turned into a giant Sabbat.

Chapter titles

1. A Midsummer Night's Dream: Wedding March (夏の夜の夢・結婚行進曲, Natsu no Yoru no Yume: Kekkon Kōshinkyoku)
2. Lohengrin: Bridal Chorus 2 (ローエングリン・結婚行進曲2, Rōengurin: Kekkon Kōshinkyoku 2)
3. Saint-Saëns: Marche Héroïque (サン・サーンス・英雄行進曲, San Sānsu: Eiyū Kōshinkyoku)
4. The Last Scene Again (ラストシーンをもう一度, Rasuto Shīn o Mō Ichido)

== Novel ==
Novel: Kamen Rider Kiva (小説 仮面ライダーキバ, Shōsetsu Kamen Raidā Kiba), written by Kenji Konuta and supervised by Toshiki Inoue, is part of a series of spin-off novel adaptions of the Heisei Era Kamen Riders. The novel was released on March 18, 2013.

== Cast ==
2008 side

- Wataru Kurenai (紅 渡, Kurenai Wataru): Kōji Seto (瀬戸 康史, Seto Kōji)
- Keisuke Nago (名護 啓介, Nago Keisuke): Keisuke Kato (加藤 慶祐, Katō Keisuke)
- Megumi Aso (麻生 恵, Asō Megumi): Nana Yanagisawa (柳沢 なな, Yanagisawa Nana)
- Kengo Eritate (襟立 健吾, Eritate Kengo): Kohei Kumai (熊井 幸平, Kumai Kōhei)
- Shizuka Nomura (野村 静香, Nomura Shizuka): Rina Koike (小池 里奈, Koike Rina)
- Taiga Nobori (登 太牙, Nobori Taiga): Shouma Yamamoto (山本 匠馬, Yamamoto Shōma)
- Mio Suzuki (鈴木 深央, Suzuki Mio): Yuria Haga (芳賀 優里亜, Haga Yuria)

1986 side

- Otoya Kurenai (紅 音也, Kurenai Otoya): Kouhei Takeda (武田 航平, Takeda Kōhei)
- Yuri Aso (麻生 ゆり, Asō Yuri): Yu Takahashi (高橋 優, Takahashi Yū)
- King (キング, Kingu): Shinya Niiro (新納 慎也, Niiro Shin'ya)

No side

- Mamoru Shima (嶋 護, Shima Mamoru): Kazuhiko Kanayama (金山 一彦, Kanayama Kazuhiko)
- Akira Kido (木戸 明, Kido Akira): Houka Kinoshita (木下 ほうか, Kinoshita Hōka)
- Riki (力): Eiji Takigawa (滝川 英治, Takigawa Eiji)
- Jiro (次狼, Jirō): Kenji Matsuda (松田 賢二, Matsuda Kenji)
- Ramon (ラモン): Yuuki Ogoe (小越 勇輝, Ogoe Yūki)
- Maya (真夜): Saki Kagami (加賀美 早紀, Kagami Saki)
- Rook (ルーク, Rūku): Tomohide Takahara (高原 知秀, Takahara Tomohide)
- Bishop (ビショップ, Bishoppu): Mitsu Murata (村田 充, Murata Mitsu)
- Ryo Itoya (糸矢 僚, Itoya Ryō): Sohto (創斗, Sōto)

=== Voice cast ===
- Kivat-bat the 3rd (キバットバットIII世, Kibattobatto Sansei), Kivat-bat the 2nd (キバットバットII世, Kibattobatto Nisei): Tomokazu Sugita (杉田 智和, Sugita Tomokazu)
- Tatsulot (タツロット, Tatsurotto): Akira Ishida (石田 彰, Ishida Akira)
- Fangires (ファンガイア, Fangaia; Vocal effects): Katsumi Shiono (塩野 勝美, Shiono Katsumi)

=== Guest cast ===
- Kaoru Tsugami (津上 カオル, Tsugami Kaoru; 1): Nobuo Kyo (姜 暢雄, Kyō Nobuo)
- Hitomi Miyazawa (宮澤 ひとみ, Miyazawa Hitomi; 2): Masako Umemiya (梅宮 万紗子, Umemiya Masako)
- Takeo Ōmura (大村 武男, Ōmura Takeo; 9–10): Katsuyuki Murai (村井 克行, Murai Katsuyuki)
- Tohru Miyake (三宅 徹, Miyake Tōru; 13–14): Satoshi Jinbo (神保 悟志, Jinbo Satoshi)
- Mami Kurasawa (倉沢 マミ, Kurasawa Mami; 17–18): Ryoko Yui (遊井 亮子, Yūi Ryōko)
- Pyschic (19): Ben Hiura (樋浦勉, Hiura Ben)
- Doctor (20): Junichi Kubozono (窪園 純一, Kubozono Junichi)
- Yamashita (山下, Yamashita; 21–22): Yūrei Yanagi (柳 憂怜, Yanagi Yūrei)
- Kumi (久美, Kumi; 21–22): Manami Hashimoto (橋本 愛実, Hashimoto Manami)
- Shinji Takeuchi (竹内 伸二, Takeuchi Shinji; 23–24): Kenji Mizuhashi (水橋 研二, Mizuhashi Kenji)
- Tanahashi (棚橋; 27–28): Atsushi Ogawa (小川 敦史, Ogawa Atsushi)
- Aberu (阿鐘; 29–31): Akira Kubodera (窪寺 昭, Kubodera Akira)
- Mitsuhide Aso (麻生 光秀, Asō Mitsuhide; 29–31, 48): Masei Nakayama (中山 麻聖, Nakayama Masei)
- Kurosawa (黒沢; 32–33): Kazuoki (和興)
- Numakawa (沼川; 32–33): Makoto Sakamoto (坂本 真, Sakamoto Makoto)
- Kaede (楓; 34–35): Tomomi Miyashita (宮下 ともみ, Miyashita Tomomi)
- Dr. Kanda (神田博士, Kanda Hakase; 34–35): Kisuke Iida (飯田 基祐, Iida Kisuke)
- Masao Kurenai (紅 正夫, Kurenai Masao; 48): Kouhei Takeda

== Songs ==
Opening theme

- "Break the Chain"
  - Lyrics: Shoko Fujibayashi
  - Composition: Shuhei Naruse
  - Arrangement: Tourbillon, Shuhei Naruse
  - Artist: Tourbillon
  The single "Break the Chain" was released on March 26, 2008. In its first day of sales, it made No. 3 on the Oricon daily charts for singles before becoming No. 3 on the weekly charts. In the finale, "Break the Chain" is used as a true ending theme, playing over the end credits instead of over the battle.

Insert themes

- "Destiny's Play"
  - Lyrics: Shoko Fujibayashi
  - Composition: NKMD
  - Arrangement: Shuhei Naruse
  - Artist: Tetra-Fang
  - Episodes: 8–14, 17–18, 22
  The single "Destiny's Play" was released on April 23, 2008. A special edition CD/DVD single was also released containing the music video. Unlike with Den-O, Kiva does not have a different ending arrangement of Destiny's Play for each of Kiva's different forms. It entered at No. 15 on the Oricon Daily Charts on its release date and reached No. 44 in its second week in the Oricon Weekly Charts. On the Kamen Rider Kiva Original Soundtrack was an included track titled "Destiny's Play IKEMENS Ver. ~feat. Kengo Eritate~ (Destiny's Play イケメンズVer.～feat.襟立健吾～, Destiny's Play Ikemenzu Ver. ~feat. Eritate Kengo~), the performance from episode 12.
- "Individual-System"
  - Lyrics: Shoko Fujibayashi
  - Composition & Arrangement: Shuhei Naruse
  - Artist: TETRA-FANG
  - Episodes: 15–16, 20–21
  "Individual-System" is described as having a blend of 1980s pop music and contemporary music. It was initially revealed to be the second ending theme when a posting on the Avex blog for Kiva mentioned that an ending theme song for Kamen Rider Ixa was to be arranged by Naruse with lyrics by Fujibayashi, initially called "Individual System". The single was released on June 25, 2008. "Individual-System" is still performed by TETRA-FANG with KOJI on vocals, but there were multiple versions of the song to reflect the different users of the Ixa System.
- "Innocent Trap"
  - Lyrics: Shoko Fujibayashi
  - Composition & Arrangement: Shuhei Naruse
  - Artist: TETRA-FANG
  - Episodes: 19
  Toei's website for Kiva lists "Innocent Trap" as Basshaa Form's ending theme.
- "Shout in the Moonlight"
  - Lyrics: Shoko Fujibayashi
  - Composition & Arrangement: Ryo (of defspiral)
  - Artist: TETRA-FANG
  - Episodes: 23
  "Shout in the Moonlight" is Garulu Form's ending theme.
- "Supernova"
  - Lyrics: Shoko Fujibayashi
  - Composition: NAOKI MAEDA
  - Arrangement: Shuhei Naruse
  - Artist: TETRA-FANG
  - Episodes: 24–27, 29, 31–33, 37–39, 41–42, 45, 48
  "Supernova" is Emperor Form's ending theme.
- "Fight for Justice"
  - Lyrics: Shoko Fujibayashi
  - Composition & Arrangement: Shuhei Naruse
  - Artist: Keisuke Nago (Keisuke Kato)
  - Episodes: 28, 30, 40, 44
  This arrangement of "Individual-System" is the first ending theme to be performed by someone other than TETRA-FANG. The single was released on July 30, 2008, with Keisuke Kato providing the vocals. This version was initially titled "Individual-System～Fight for justice～", however the single has since been renamed "Fight for Justice" on the single "Fight for Justice ~Individual-System NAGO ver.~" The song was sampled for a preview in the "Individual-System NAGO advance fist" track on the "Individual-System" single. In its first week on the charts, "Fight for Justice ~Individual-System NAGO ver.~" peaked at 28 on the Oricon Charts.
- "Roots of the King"
  - Lyrics: Shoko Fujibayashi
  - Composition & Arrangement: Shuhei Naruse
  - Artist: TETRA-FANG
  - Episodes: 34–36, 43
  "Roots of the King" is the theme song for Kamen Rider Dark Kiva and his son Kamen Rider Saga. On September 13, 2008, Naruse announced on the Avex Movie blog for Kiva that the next single to be released by TETRA-FANG was to be titled "Roots of the KING." He also refers to the song as "Roots of the King" on his personal blog, which has since become the title of the song.

Avex's blog for Kiva mentions a song entitled "Bite There Soul" that was written by Naruse and YUJI as a heavy metal song played by street musicians in episode 9 which was planned to be released at a future date, and was subsequently put on the final CD box set as "Bite Their Soul" then released on January 21, 2009. A mini-album released on August 6, 2008, titled SUPERNOVA features the theme songs for Kiva's four additional forms performed by TETRA-FANG. The tracks include "Innocent Trap", "Shout in the Moonlight", and "Supernova", which has a music video included in a special DVD edition of SUPERNOVA. An unfeatured song from SUPERNOVA titled "Silent Shout" is Dogga Form's theme. Another track from the album "Message" is a tribute song for the character Otoya Kurenai.

Kouhei Takeda has recorded a song titled "This love never ends" as the theme song for Otoya as Ixa. Nana Yanagisawa and Yu Takahashi have also provided their voices for tracks to be included on an album for all characters who have become Kamen Rider Ixa. This song has since been revealed to be titled "Feel the same" on an album titled Inherited-System. Other songs on this album include "Don't Lose Yourself" performed by Keisuke Kato as Keisuke Nago and "Inherited-System" performed by the Wonderful Blue Sky Organization (素晴らしき青空の会, Subarashiki Aozora no Kai). Kenji Matsuda as Jiro performs the song "Keep alive" for the album. For a TETRA-FANG album titled DESTINY, Koji Seto has recorded the vocals for a song titled "Mind garden." Several songs from this album are theme songs for the members of the Checkmate Four group: "Lightning to Heaven" for the Rook, "Exterminate Time" for the King (Kamen Rider Dark Kiva), "Eternity Blood" for the Bishop, and "Rainy Rose" for the Queen (Maya). Also on the album is "Prayer~Message 2", another tribute to Otoya.

An album titled Masked Rider Kiva Re-Union was released on June 24, 2009, with some original Kiva songs rearranged. "Destiny's Play" has been rearranged, Koji Seto & Shouma Yamamoto sang "Roots of the King" together, Koji Seto gave his own rendition of "This love never ends", and Kouhei Takeda gave his own rendition of "Supernova".
