= Break the Chain =

Single by Tourbillon
- Released: March 26, 2008
- Recorded: 2008
- Genre: Alternative rock, hard rock, gothic rock
- Length: 4:18
- Label: Avex Trax
- Songwriters: Shoko Fujibayashi, Shuhei Naruse

Tourbillon singles chronology
"Ageha/Selfish" (2006)	"Break the Chain" (2008)

Kamen Rider Series theme song singles chronology
"Climax Jump" (2007)	"Break the Chain" (2008)	"Journey Through the Decade" (2009)

"Break the Chain" is a song by Japanese rock band Tourbillon, and was the band's fifth and final single. It was released a year-and-a-half following the release of their second album A Tide of New Era, and was used as the opening theme for the 2008 television series Kamen Rider Kiva. Ryuichi Kawamura stated that the song was not just the "let's beat up the bad guys!" kind of Kamen Rider Series opening theme, but a song that both children and adults can enjoy.

"Break the Chain" reached the number 3 position of the Oricon Weekly Charts on the week of its release, the highest ranked single the band ever released. The song was not included on any of their albums. It would later be included in the Kamen Rider Kiva soundtracks and it was also featured on the "Song Attack Ride" album series during the broadcast of the successor to Kiva, Kamen Rider Decade, where it was remixed by Rider Chips and Shuhei Naruse.

== Track listing ==
All lyrics are written by Shoko Fujibayashi; all music is composed by Shuhei Naruse, all music arranged by Naruse and Tourbillon.

No.	Title	Length
1.	"Break the Chain"	4:18
2.	"Break the Chain" (TV size edit)	1:18
3.	"Break the Chain" (I.MIX)	2:27
4.	"Break the Chain" (H.MIX)	4:33
5.	"Break the Chain" (instrumental)	4:17
Total length:		16:54
