= Kenji Tominaga =

Japanese suit actor (born 1970)

Kenji Tominaga (富永 研司, Tominaga Kenji, born May 9, 1970) is a Japanese suit actor who played Kamen Rider Kuuga in all his forms, in Kamen Rider Kuuga. He returned to do suit work for the A.R. World Kuuga in episodes 25 and 26 of Kamen Rider Decade and in Kamen Rider Decade: All Riders vs. Dai-Shocker.

He also played an angry instructor in episode 21 of Kamen Rider W. He once again served as suit actor for Kamen Rider Kuuga in Kamen Rider × Super Sentai: Super Hero Taisen.

== Stunt/suit actor roles ==
=== Kamen Rider Series ===
- Kamen Rider Kuuga (2000-2001) - Kamen Rider Kuuga
- Kamen Rider Decade (2009) - Kamen Rider Kuuga
- Kamen Rider Decade: All Riders vs. Dai-Shocker (2009) - Kamen Rider Kuuga
- Kamen Rider × Super Sentai: Super Hero Taisen (2012) - Kamen Rider Kuuga
- Kamen Rider Gaim (2013-2014) - Kamen Rider Duke
- Kamen Rider × Kamen Rider Gaim & Wizard: The Fateful Sengoku Movie Battle (2013) - Kamen Rider Bujin Gaim, Ogre
- Heisei Riders vs. Shōwa Riders: Kamen Rider Taisen feat. Super Sentai (2014) - Kamen Rider Fifteen

== Non-suit actor roles ==
- Kamen Rider W (2009-2010) - angry instructor (Episode 21)
- Heisei Riders vs. Shōwa Riders: Kamen Rider Taisen feat. Super Sentai (2014)
