= List of Samurai Sentai Shinkenger episodes =

This is a list of Samurai Sentai Shinkenger episodes. Each episode is called an Act (幕, Maku). Each episode is also titled entirely in kanji, with furigana readings given for each.

On August 6, 2010, TV Asahi aired special editions of episodes 1 and 2 of Shinkenger with some previously unseen footage cut from the original airing of the two episodes, referring to these two episodes as "Special Versions" (特別版, Tokubetsuban).

== Episodes ==
No.	Title	Written by	Original release date
1	"The Gallant Appearance of the Five Samurai"; Transliteration: "Date Sugata Go Samurai" (Japanese: 伊達姿五侍)	Yasuko Kobayashi	February 15, 2009
When the Gedoushu are revived and begin to attack the mortal realm, Takeru Shiba of the Shiba House takes arms to fight them as Shinken Red. After defeating a company of Nanashi, Takeru becomes annoyed when his retainer, Hikoma Kusakabe, affectionately called "Jii", implores him to find his four vassals to fight alongside him, instead of fighting on his own. Meanwhile, on the Sanzu River, Doukoku finally awakens, and upon learning that the Shinkengers still exist, becomes enraged and sends the Akayashi Kagekamuro to attack the humans with an army of Nanashi. Against Takeru's wishes, Jii summons the vassals: kabuki actor Ryunosuke Ikenami, kindergarten teacher Mako Shiraishi, carefree Chiaki Tani, and pure-hearted Kotoha Hanaori. Upon meeting the four, Takeru gives each one a chance to back out of his service, and when all four decline, he gives each one a Shodo Phone. Takeru, Ryunosuke, Chiaki, Mako, and Kotoha then take on Kagekamuro and his numerous Nanashi. Shinken Red slays Kagekamuro, but in spite of that, he tells his vassals to remain on their guard. Sure enough, the Ayakashi is reborn as a giant, so the Shinkengers enlarge their Origami to confront and destroy him. After the battle, Jii arrives to bring everyone to the Shiba House.
2	"The Stylish Combination"; Transliteration: "Kiwametsuki Ikina Gattai" (Japanese: 極付粋合体)	Yasuko Kobayashi	February 22, 2009
After being summoned to serve Takeru as his vassals, Ryunosuke, Mako, Chiaki, and Kotoha begin their transition into Shinkengers. However, while practicing their kanji to perfect their Modikara abilities, Chiaki shirks it off and has Ryunosuke and Mako start to question Takeru until Kotoha is nowhere to be found, finding her practice as reveals her reasons for becoming a vassal. When the Ayakashi Ootsumuji appears, the vassals deal with the Nanashi while Shinken Red fights Ootsumuji. But when the vassals took the blow meant for him, Shinken Red seem cold to Kotoha being heavily wounded as he runs after the Ayakashi. But when they learn their master was cold in order to save a little girl the monster was heading towards, the vassals fully realize their mission and join their master in executing the deathblow. But when Ootsumuji revives into a giant, the Shinkengers combine their Origami to form Shinkenoh, after the vassals' own Oden combination attempt under Ryunosuke did not work. After dealing with the Ōnanashi summoned to hinder it, Shinkenoh slays Ootsumuji. After Ryunosuke apologizes for forsaking him and his combination blunder, he disciplines himself as Takeru and the other vassals leave him behind.
3	"An Extermination Skill Contest"; Transliteration: "Udetaiji Udekurabe" (Japanese: 腕退治腕比)	Yasuko Kobayashi	March 1, 2009
The vassals train as Chiaki is being chewed out by Takeru for over sleeping and his lack of training as a Shinkenger. This does not sit well with Chiaki, and he ditches training to go hang out with his friends Masato and Kouji. While they're out, they are attacked by the Ayakashi Rokuroneri as Chiaki runs at the monster. However, due to his lack of training, Shinken Green is easily defeated by Rokuroneri and his extending arms prior to his friends being attacked before the others arrives to cover their escape. Telling Chiaki that he is to blame for his friends ending up in the hospital, Takeru tells him he should quit if he cannot find a means to counter Rokuroneri's talent by the next day. After giving it thought, Chiaki gets an idea and starts to train himself as Takeru undergoes his own training. The next day, Rokuroneri resumes his attack until the Shinkengers arrive with Chiaki following to take on the Ayakashi on his own while the others deal with the Nanashi. With his training, Shinken Green manages to uses Rokuroneri's arrogance against him to disable his arms and execute the deathblow. When Rokuroneri is revived, despite Shinken Green's intent to finish him off himself, Shinkenoh is formed and slays the Ayakashi after Shinken Red's own training pull off. After the fight, Chiaki finally accepts being Takeru's vassal and vows to surpass him in skill.
4	"Nightly Tears of Sympathy"; Transliteration: "Yowanasake Namidagawa" (Japanese: 夜話情涙川)	Yasuko Kobayashi	March 8, 2009
After confronting the Ayakashi Namiayashi who eludes them, The Shinkengers search for the young boy whom the monster made a promise to, a little leaguer named Ryota. Ryunosuke and Mako manage to find him and attempt to talk to Ryota, but the boy refused to answer them and pedals off. Following him to his home to learn whatever secret he has, the two get into a discussion of Ryunosuke's personal regret of his life-long dream that he has been keeping to himself before Mako comforts him, later giving him poorly made muffler and meal as they spend the night at the stake out. The next day, they find Ryota on the move as he suddenly disposes of his baseball stuff and calls Namiayashi as he performs his end of the promise, hurting himself so he cannot play baseball in order to get his grandfather back. However, Namiayashi revealed it to be a lie as part of his plan to make the boy cry to overflow the Sanzu River. Vowing to make the Ayakashi pay, Ryunosuke and Mako transform to fight him as the others arrive. While the others deal with the Nanashi, Shinken Blue and Shinken Pink defeat Namiayashi as he revives into a giant. After the Ryu and the Kame Origami get a shot at him, Shinkenoh is formed and finishes the Ayakashi off. Later, after Takeru uses his Modikara to ease Ryota as he stands by the sidelines, Ryunosuke is confused when Mako turns him down.
5	"The Kabuto Origami"; Transliteration: "Kabuto Origami" (Japanese: 兜折神)	Yasuko Kobayashi	March 15, 2009
While the vassals spend their leisure time at an amusement park, Takeru trains to master the use of the Kabuto Secret Disk by making his Modikara twice as strong. While he attempts this, the vassals attack the Ayakashi Yanasudare whose attacks have no effect on his flexible body and are no match for his marksmanship. Once Shinken Red arrives, the Shinkengers are no match for Yanasudare who falls back when he begins to dry up. While at the Shiba House, Jii instills hope in the vassals as Takeru reveals the Kabuto Disk to them and it may be the key to defeat the Ayakashi once he masters doubling his Modikara. Takeru keeps training into the night, nearly destroying himself with Jii watching with worry. The next day, a rehydrated Yanasudare resumes his attack with the vassals arriving to fight him as Takeru arrives to challenge him. Though reluctant at first, Takeru channels enough Modikara to use the Kabuto Disk, allowing his Rekka Daizantou to assume Ōzutsu Mode in order to fire the Kabuto Five Rings Bullet to kill Yanasudare. When Yanasudare resurrects into a giant, he overwhelms Shinkenoh until Shinken Red uses the Kabuto Disk to summon the Kabuto Origami. To counter the Ōnanashi Yanasudare summons, Kabuto-Shinkenoh is formed to take them out before slaying Yanasudare. After the fight, a nearly exhausted Takeru returns home as Jii helps him up.
6	"The Abusive King"; Transliteration: "Waruguchiō" (Japanese: 悪口王)	Yasuko Kobayashi	March 22, 2009
During training, Kotoha accidentally injures Chiaki and insists on tending to him. When she succeeds only at unnerving him and making a mess of the room, Kotoha takes full responsibility and apologizes for being clumsy and stupid. The Ayakashi Zuboshimeshi appears and subjects his victims to insults that hurt their feelings so deeply that the verbal abuse actually becomes a physical assault. The Shinkengers are also struck down by Zuboshimeshi's attacks, save for Shinken Yellow; when the Ayakashi calls her "stupid," she is unaffected and continues fighting, forcing Zuboshimeshi to retreat. When the Shinkengers wonder why Kotoha was apparently immune to Zuboshimeshi's attacks, Kotoha simply says that everything it said about her was mostly true. Chiaki berates Kotoha for believing herself to be so lowly, and she runs out. When Chiaki catches up to her, Kotoha tells him that the one person who could always comfort her when she felt low was her sister, so when her sister became ill, Kotoha resolved to be strong for the both of them. Chiaki apologizes to Kotoha for his outburst, and they join their teammates to face Zuboshimeshi. While the others deal with the Nanashi, Shinken Yellow and Shinken Green team up and successfully disable Zuboshimeshi. After destroying Zuboshimeshi with the Rekka Daizantou Ōzutsu Mode, the Shinkengers assemble Kabuto-Shinkenoh to finish off his second life. Once the battle is over, Kotoha collapses from exhaustion. Having gained significant respect for her, Chiaki carries Kotoha on his back when everyone returns to the Shiba home.
7	"Marlin Fishing"; Transliteration: "Kajiki Ippontsuri" (Japanese: 舵木一本釣)	Yasuko Kobayashi	March 29, 2009
While having breakfast, the Shinkengers learn that the Kajiki Origami has been sighted at the Funabuta Coast as the Ayakashi Yamiororo appears. While the others go after Yamiororo, Ryunosuke is sent to acquire the Origami itself by fishing for it. But after failed attempts to catch it, Ryunosuke receives the aid of a mysterious fisherman named Sakutaro Komatsu before being contacted by Jii that the others got poisoned by Yamiororo and the Kajiki Origami is needed to cure them. Though Sakutaro questions the point of his endeavor, Ryunosuke resumes fishing as Takeru leaves to slow Yamiororo down in spite of the pain from the poison. Motivated by his lord's determination, Ryunosuke finally manages to fish the Kajiki Origami out with aid from Sakutaro. With the Kajiki Disk in hand, Ryunosuke makes his way to Takeru as the other vassals came to his aid, using the disk's power to cure everyone before they change to use the Rekka Daizantou's Kajiki Five Rings Bullet to kill Yamiororo, destroying him again with the newly formed Kajiki-Shinkenoh. As Sakutaro secretly resumes his duty as a kuroko, a mysterious figure who witnessed the Shinkengers' fight with Yamiororo walks off.
8	"The Brides are Spirited Away"; Transliteration: "Hanayome Kamikakushi" (Japanese: 花嫁神隠)	Yasuko Kobayashi	April 5, 2009
The Nanashi are kidnapping brides from weddings all over the city. In order to figure out why, Takeru and his vassals disguise themselves as a wedding party, hoping to bait the Nanashi. After their last effort proves unsuccessful, Takeru manages to get all upcoming weddings cancelled, save for one, in order to improve their chances of confronting the Nanashi. Takeru and Mako stand in for the bride and groom and put up little resistance against the Nanashi, allowing Mako to be kidnapped. Mako is brought before Dayu Usukawa, who has been kidnapping the brides, hoping to use their tears to finish the brocade on her uchikake. Dayu reveals that she knew that the Shinkengers would try to stop her, so she dispatched a second set of Nanashi to kidnap the real bride. She then forces Mako to call Takeru and the others and lure them into an ambush and poises to strike Mako down. The Shinkengers arrive to rescue Mako, and Shinken Red reveals that he had his own counter-plan; the real bride turns out to be Ryunosuke in disguise and Modikara-based clones were used to make Dayu think that her plan succeeded. After the Shinkengers free the captive brides, they battle Dayu and her Nanashi. Before they can finish her off with the Kabuto Five Rings Bullet, however, a new enemy, Juzo Fuwa, counters the attack. Juzo spirits Dayu away, with the Ōnanashi providing cover for them. Shinkenoh, using both the Kabuto and the Kajiki Origami, destroys the remaining grunts. Afterwards, as the vassals head to a cake shop to celebrate, Takeru is troubled by Juzo's parting shot about testing his abilities soon.
9	"The Tiger's Rebellion"; Transliteration: "Tora no Hankōki" (Japanese: 虎反抗期)	Yasuko Kobayashi	April 12, 2009
As Shinken Red and Shinken Blue spar with the others watching, amazed at the latter's abilities, Doukoku commends Juzo for saving Dayu as he reveals he is interested in taking on Shinken Red himself. As Juzo leaves, the Ayakashi Hitomidama offers his services. The Shinkengers arrive to face Hitomidama who reveals to possess the Tora Origami before launching his attack on Shinken Green. But Shinken Blue takes the intended hit only to be brought under Hitomidama's control as well. As the fight continues with Shinken Red fighting Hitomidama, the other vassals fight Shinken Blue and lose to him, leading Shinken Red to take the others in retreat. When Hitomidama resumes his attack later, Takeru goes ahead to challenge Shinken Blue to a duel. Though the Shinkengers worry for Takeru and Ryunosuke, a mysterious figure arrives to reveal that Takeru is the winner in the fight. As Takeru defeats Ryunosuke and breaks the Ayakashi's spell, an angered Hitomidama summons the Tora Origami to take out the Shinkengers. While Shinken Red uses the Sisi Origami to reclaim the Tora Origami, the vassals kill Hitomidama. When Hitomidama revives as a giant, the Tora Origami overwhelms its former master as Shinkenoh is formed, combining with it to become Tora-Shinkenoh to finish the Ayakashi off. As the others help a wounded Ryunosuke who is distraught about nearly destroying Takeru, they are shocked when Takeru apologizes to him, explaining that the technique he used to break Hitomidama's spell could have killed Ryuunosuke. Takeru tells his vassal to never mention it again as the mysterious man, Juzo in human form, watches them leave.
10	"The Great Sky Combination"; Transliteration: "Daitenkū Gattai" (Japanese: 大天空合体)	Yasuko Kobayashi	April 19, 2009
After Takeru reveals to his vassals that the three support Origami can be combined into DaiTenku, the Kabuto Disk is entrusted to Mako as the Kabuto Origami's official user to the dismay of Chiaki, who feels he is lacking and proceeds to train himself. When the Ayakashi Okakurage arrives and uses his power to conjure despair-inducing rain, the Shinkengers arrive to fight him. During the fight, Shinken Green attempts to use the Kabuto Disk to fight, only to be unable to use its power as Okakurage escapes. Soon after, an irate Jii chews out Chiaki as the two start to argue while the other vassals attempt to stop the fight. Later, after talking to Takeru of his actions, Jii takes Chiaki to a bamboo forest to explain the true nature of Modikara and must embrace his character to access its full power. By the time the two apologize to each other, Chiaki runs to his team's aid when they are overwhelmed by Okakurage. Mastering his Modikara, Shinken Green manages to kill Okakurage as the revived Ayakashi proceeds to overpower Shinkenoh. After Shinken Pink gives Shinken Green the Kabuto Disk, the three male Shinkengers summon the support Origami and combine them all into DaiTenku. With Shinkenoh providing back up, DaiTenku manages to destroy Okakurage. Soon after, in spite of coming to terms, Chiaki and Jii get into another fight.
11	"A Threefold Strife"; Transliteration: "Mitsudomoe Ōsōdō" (Japanese: 三巴大騒動)	Yasuko Kobayashi	April 26, 2009
After learning the meaning behind Juzo's words from Shitari, an enraged Doukoku sends the entire Nanashi Company to the mortal realm with the Shinkengers managing to drive Nanashi back into the land of the dead as another wave takes their place as they all start going after Shinken Red on Doukoku's command. After Shinken Red takes them all out, the vassals learn that the Gedoushu are now after Takeru as his death would ensure the Rokumon Junk would never be resealed. While Doukoku takes a nap from drinking too much sake, Shitari summons the Ayakashi Ushirobushi who uses the Shiba House's detection system to lure the Shinkengers into a trap and call Takeru out. Not wanting the vassals to risk their lives for him, Takeru changes and fights the Ayakashi by himself. Losing to Ushirobushi, Shinken Red is horrified when Shinken Blue and Shinken Yellow take a hit meant for him. But then, Juzo arrives to personally kill Shinken Red himself, leading to an explosive three-way sword fight with a wounded Mako and Chiaki forced to watch. With the fight ending in a stalemate as he drys up, Ushirobushi takes his leave as Juzo follows after seeing Takeru not ready for their fight. Later that night, as Kotoha and Ryunosuke have their wounds tended to, a torn Takeru ran off into the night in spite of his own injuries.
12	"The Very First Super Samurai Combination"; Transliteration: "Shijō Hatsu Chō Samurai Gattai" (Japanese: 史上初超侍合体)	Yasuko Kobayashi	May 3, 2009
Burdened by the newfound pressure of his vassals risking their lives to protect him, Takeru leaves the Shiba House to think. While this occurred, after hearing of his meddling, Doukoku sics the Nanashi after Juzo before he himself arrives to clash blades over who has the right to kill Shinken Red. After Juzo is driven off in human form, Shitari tells Ushirobushi to resume his mission. The next day, as Jii pretends not to show concern for his master's disappearance, Chiaki and Mako see through him as they are discuss the troubles Takeru goes as Ryunosuke and Kotoha overhearing them. While sitting on a dock bench, Takeru meets a young boy named Hiroki who he learned from his teacher lost his father during a Gedoushu attack. When the Gedoushu begin attacking the district to flush out their quarry, Ushirobushi attempts to kill Hiroki when Takeru returns to save them before the vassals arrives to hold off the Nanashi as Takeru is convinced to return to them as they manage to counter Ushirobushi's signature attack with their Tora Five Rings Bullet, destroying him. When he resurrects a giant, Ushirobushi summons the Ōzorananashi to overwhelm Shinkenoh. On Ryunosuke's suggestion, the Shinkengers summon DaiTenku and have it combine with Shinkenoh to form Tenku-Shinkenoh. Taking out the Ōzorananashi, Tenku-Shinkenoh slays Ushiroboshi with its Tenku Bamboo Slice. Soon after, Takeru receives a warm Kodomo no Hi welcome to the Shiba House.
13	"Heavy Cries"; Transliteration: "Omoi Nakigoe" (Japanese: 重泣声)	Yasuko Kobayashi	May 10, 2009
Mako goes out to buy groceries for a meal she is cooking for the Shinkengers, while the guys fear what she will be cooking for dinner. While she is out, she finds several children crying due to creatures known as the Shiro-Oniko, created by the Ayakashi Nakinakite to replace them in their parents' eyes. She begins fighting Nakinakite as the other Shinkengers arrive to assist, only for the guys to end up with Nakinakite's Aka-Oniko latching on as they begin to weigh them down the longer they cry. The guys and Jii do their best to keep the Aka-Oniko happy while the girls go out to cheer up the crying children, until the injuries Mako receive from the fight take their toll. As Kotoha comforts Mako, their work with the children caused the Sanzu River to dry up as Nakinakite resurfaced to get them. Though the two were at a disadvantage against the Ayakashi by themselves, Shinken Pink and Shinken Yellow combine their Modikara to destroy Nakinakite, with his creations fading away. When Nakinakite resurrects as a giant, the group forms Shinkenoh before two Aka-Oniko latch onto them. With Shinken Blue's urging, the guys form DaiTenku and land on the back of Nakinakite, giving him a taste of his own medicine. While he is berated for having a bad idea, the girls in Shinkenoh finish off Nakinakite as DaiTenku flies off, dissolving the Aka-Oniko. After reuniting the children with their parents, Mako returns and finishes cooking everyone's dinner with help from the kuroko.
14	"The Foreign Samurai"; Transliteration: "Ikoku no Samurai" (Japanese: 異国侍)	Akatsuki Yamatoya	May 17, 2009
Ryunosuke is having a good day when he meets a man named Mister Brown. Mister Brown was one of the innocent bystanders poisoned by Yamiororo during his battle with the Shinkengers. After seeing the Shinkengers transform and rescue the city, Mister Brown dubs himself their number one fan and begs to be taught the ways of Bushidō. The group decides to have Ryunosuke run Mister Brown through a grueling training regimen, hoping that Mister Brown will quit out of frustration. Ryunosuke feels guilty about the deliberate intent, deciding to encourage him not to give up. Mister Brown, feeling that he is learning well, is so encouraged by his supposed progress that he places himself in harm's way when the other Shinkengers take on the Ayakashi Hachouchin. Hachouchin is on the brink of defeating the Shinkengers when he retreats, needing to rehydrate. Later, when Mister Brown meets up with Ryunosuke for his next training session, Ryunosuke tells him that he cannot train Mister Brown anymore and leaves. Mister Brown misinterprets Ryunosuke's words, thinking that he has mastered his training, and joins the Shinkengers as they prepare to confront Hachouchin the next day. After Hachounin's sucker punch nearly kills Mister Brown, Shinken Blue launches the first assault against Hachouchin, and the other Shinkengers follow suit before Hachouchin takes all five down easily. Mister Brown implores the Shinkengers to keep fighting, which revitalizes their fighting spirit. Shinken Red hands off the Rekka Daizanto Oozutsu Mode to Shinken Blue, who, alongside Mister Brown, uses the Kajiki Five Rings Bullet to destroy Hachouchin's first life with Tenku-Shinkenoh destroying the Ayakashi for good. Afterwards, Mister Brown announces that he is returning to his home country to teach Bushidō to his fellow citizens, and Ryunosuke and the other Shinkengers wish him good luck.
15	"The Imposter and the Real Deal's Arrest"; Transliteration: "Nisemono Honmono Ōtorimono" (Japanese: 偽物本物大捕物)	Daisuke Ishibashi	May 24, 2009
Frustrated with being unable to perform Shirahadori like Ryunosuke and Takeru, Chiaki goes off to train on his own. The Ayakashi Narisumashi appears close to where Chiaki is training, so Chiaki confronts him. Shinken Green makes short work of the Nanashi, but he is knocked out by Narisumashi and depowered. While the Shinkengers are battling the Nanashi, Narisumashi assumes Chiaki's appearance and taunts them. When Chiaki comes to, he finds his teammates angry with him, though Takeru thinks something is amiss. Narisumashi continues his plan of ostracizing Chiaki from the Shinkengers by pulling pranks on them using Chiaki's appearance, and, having done so successfully, assumes Kotoha's appearance to get close enough to kill Chiaki while his guard is down. However, Chiaki discovers the Ayakashi's deception, so he tricks Narisumashi into going after the other Shinkengers at Mt. Kurogane. When Narisumashi arrives at Mt. Kurogane, Chiaki exposes him. During one-on-one combat with Narisumashi, Shinken Green successfully disarms the Ayakashi, then joins Shinken Red in landing the deathblow with the Kabuto Five Rings Bullet. Tenku-Shinkenoh then destroys the resurrected Narisumashi. As they return home, the other Shinkengers apologize to Chiaki. Meanwhile, Dayu finds Juzo's body washed up on the shores of the Sanzu River.
16	"The Power of the Kuroko"; Transliteration: "Kuroko no Chikara" (Japanese: 黒子力)	Akatsuki Yamatoya	May 31, 2009
Some time after the working on their Modikara training, on Jii's suggestion after causing a priceless vase to break, Ryunosuke, Chiaki, and Kotoha become curious about the kurokos' helpful nature as Takeru reveals they even help everyone in the city. Inspired, Ryunosuke, Chiaki, and Kotoha attempt to be of help to the community, only causing trouble with a kuroko outdoing them at every time. Their intent to help others hampers their abilities when they go up against the shy Ayakashi Marigomori before he runs off. After talking to the three that the kuroko also support them by ensuring they can fight without any one getting in the cross fire, the Shinkengers respond to Marigomori resuming his attack. Using a combination of Modikara element attacks, the Shinkengers weaken Marigomori's shell before destroying him with the Tora Five Rings Bullet as the kuroko cheer them on. When Marigomori is resurrected, Shinkenoh uses the Kabuto and the Kajiki Origami to re-weaken the Ayakashi's shell for the Tora-Shinkenoh to finish him off. Later, the gang watch the kuroko working hard as one of them gets on Jii's bad side for breaking a priceless heirloom.
17	"The Sushi Samurai"; Transliteration: "Sushi Samurai" (Japanese: 寿司侍)	Yasuko Kobayashi	June 7, 2009
Returning after what seemed to be a false detection of an Ayakashi attack on the Gap Sensor, the Shinkengers find an arrow with a note on it that says "Coming Soon" with Takeru sensing something from before within the house as it starts to haunt him. Deciding to investigate the Gap Sensor, the vassals encounter a sushi-selling man whose hand writing matches the note. After the seller gives them the slip with spicy sushi, Ryunosuke and Mako go to Shojo Valley to find Takeru while Chiaki and Kotoha track down the sushi seller. By the time they find him, ShinkenBlue and ShinkenPink find Shinken Red confronting the Ayakashi Isagitsune who was spying on Takeru to find out the Shiba sealing character. With his mirror medium destroyed, Isagitsune overwhelms the 3 with his magic as Chiaki and Kotoha coming with the sushi seller following. But even all 5 Shinkengers are no match for Isagitsune as they revert to normal as the seller arrives to their aid, transforming into Shinken Gold. After taking out the Nanashi in blinding speed, Shinken Gold battles Isagitsune and destroys him. When Isagitsune revives, he overpowers Tenku-Shinkenoh until Shinken Gold enters the fight in the Ika Origami to weaken the Ayakashi so Tenku-Shinkenoh can land the deathblow. After the fight, Takeru reveals to his vassals that he already knows the sushi seller, Genta Umemori.
18	"Samurai Promotion"; Transliteration: "Samurai Shūmei" (Japanese: 侍襲名)	Yasuko Kobayashi	June 14, 2009
After the appearance of Shinken Gold, the vassals learn from Jii that Genta was a childhood friend of Takeru whom he obtained Ika Origami from. Before Takeru could explain why, Genta arrives late to declare himself a samurai under Takeru. As Takeru takes a step out, Genta reveals that he has been training himself for this moment before Jii takes the Sushi Changer from him. As the Shinkengers take their leave upon the Gedoushu making their move, Takeru breaks his friend's heart by refusing to accept him as an ally. After nearly losing to the vengeful Ayakashi Hyakuyappa before he falls back into the Sanzu River, Takeru is confronted by the Vassals and Genta confront Takeru on his reasons for turning Genta before Hyakuyappa resumes his attack. Remembering the promise he made with Genta years ago, Takeru acknowledges his friend as a Shinkenger. While the vassals deal with the Nanashi, Shinken Red and Shinken Gold combine their signature moves to destroy Hyakuyappa. After Hyakuyappa revives, Shinkenoh has a hard time until Ika Origami arrived and combines onto Shinkenoh to form Ika-Shinkenoh who freezes the Ayakashi before destroying him. Soon after the fight, the gang celebrates their newest ally by eating out at the Gold Sushi cart.
19	"Learning the Samurai Disposition"; Transliteration: "Samuraigokoro Tenaraichū" (Japanese: 侍心手習中)	Yasuko Kobayashi	June 28, 2009
While introducing Ebi Origami, which he created with his Sushi Changer, Genta gets into a fight with Ryunosuke who sees him as the opposite of what a samurai is supposed to be. Later, after talking to the other vassals on how to win his acceptance, Genta poses as a kuroko to spy on Ryunosuke and learn to be more like him. While following Ryunosuke on his early morning jog, Genta is exposed when they hear the scream of schoolgirls that were gathered by the Ayakashi Oinogare as part of Shitari's plan to sacrifice them to open up a permanent point between the two realms. Unable to contact the others due to the barrier that Shitari set up around the area, Shinken Blue and Shinken Gold were disarmed as they are unable to fight against the slippery Oinogare with Shitari blasts the two off and sending the Nanashi after them. After taking out their pursuers, and settling their differences, Shinken Blue and Shinken Gold save the schoolgirls as they battle Oinogare before the other Shinkengers arrive. With Shitari taking his leave and ignoring his warning, Oinogare is destroyed by Shinken Gold and Shinken Blue before he resurrects and is destroyed by Ika-Shinkenoh. After the fight, they return to Genta's stand as Ryunosuke argues with Genta after calling Ebi Origami "Ebizo", considering it an insult.
20	"The Ebi Origami's Transformation"; Transliteration: "Ebi Origami Henge" (Japanese: 海老折神変化)	Yasuko Kobayashi	July 5, 2009
While Takeru and the other vassals are preparing a surprise birthday party for Kotoha, Genta sees that the Ebi Origami is almost ready to be mobilized. The party preparations are interrupted by the Ayakashi Utakasane attacks the city and devours people's souls. Genta arrives late to the battle after encountering Juzo, who he believes to be a food critic. By the time he reaches the battle, Kotoha's soul has been stolen by the Ayakashi, leaving her comatose, with just one day left to live. Despite the male Shinkengers' attempt to stop him, Utakasane retreats into the Sanzu River. The next day, Kotoha regains consciousness just long enough to acknowledge her impending death. An enraged Chiaki tries to force Utakasane to return, but he is unsuccessful. As Takeru, Mako, and Ryunosuke catch up to Chiaki, Juzo arrives and tells them that they can enter the Sanzu River by giving up their humanity and becoming Gedonin, just as he had. The four are tempted with the idea if it means saving Kotoha and the other victims, but Genta arrives with an alternate plan to both drag out Utakasane and bring Ebi Orgami to life. Using Modikara, the group manages to bring Utakasane back into their world to destroy him before he has the chance to escape. When the Ayakashi revives as a giant, Genta enters the Ebi Origami to battle against the giant Utakasane and his Ōnanashi minions. He transforms the Ebi Origami into Daikaioh and, with assistance from DaiTenku, destroys Utakasane, freeing all of the souls to return to their bodies. That evening, Kotoha's birthday party goes on without a hitch. After the party, Genta goes out to his sushi cart and finds a mysterious young man stealing the Ika Origami. When Genta asks who he is, the young man replies that he is "...just a Kamen Rider passing through".: The first part of Kamen Rider Decade: World of Shinkenger as crossover special with Kamen Rider Decade.
21	"The Father and Son Bears"; Transliteration: "Oyakoguma" (Japanese: 親子熊)	Yasuko Kobayashi	July 19, 2009
The Shinkengers battle a group of Nanashi Company with no accompanying Ayakashi. Because the attack seems so random, Takeru is concerned and has the Shinkengers search the area. An unusual Kuroko lifts his veil as the Shinkengers leave the scene. After searching and not finding anything, Chiaki talks Mako into not returning to the mansion to train. Instead, they go into a family restaurant where they talk about Jii's hip until they run into Chiaki's father Kurando Tani. When another patron of the restaurant takes a woman as his hostage, Chiaki manages to get everyone out with him but Mako, Kurando, and a mother with her baby. Finding similar humans, Chiaki attempts to stop them as he realizes they all have red eggs on their heads. While the others deal with the Ayakashi Sasamatage who is to blame, Chiaki and Mako manage to set up a plan to free everyone while Kurando fights some Nanashi Company members by himself. By the time they arrive, the other Shinkengers successfully destroy Sasamatage who revives in his giant form. The group use Tenku-Shinkenoh to fight Sasamatage with Shinken Gold arriving in Daikaioh to quickly destroy the Ayakashi as a young woman witnesses the battle. After the fight, Takeru encounters a strange man who warns him of that his world is endangered by the presence of a person known as Decade. He later crosses paths with a strange kuroko who reveals his true identity.: The third part of Kamen Rider Decade: World of Shinkenger as crossover special with Kamen Rider Decade.
22	"Lord Butler"; Transliteration: "Tono Shitsuji" (Japanese: 殿執事)	Yasuko Kobayashi	July 26, 2009
One of Genta's best customers, the wealthy Yoshihisa Matsumiya, asks him for a favor; he asks if Genta can convince Kotoha, who Matsumiya had met once before, to masquerade as Matsumiya's fiancée at a high society party. Not only does Kotoha agree, but Takeru also agrees to pose as her butler. Meanwhile, the Ayakashi Urawadachi appears, looking for a "sweet" life to consume. Ryunosuke alerts Takeru, who leaves the party abruptly with Kotoha and Genta to join their teammates and engage Urawadachi, who summons the Nanashi to keep the Shinkengers occupied as he retreats. Takeru still senses the Ayakashi's presence as he and Kotoha, still keeping up the charade, leave for her dinner with Matsumiya. Smitten with Kotoha's kindness and pure heart, Matsumiya is about to confess his feelings when Urawadachi is revealed to be hiding in his jacket. The Ayakashi begins to suck the life out of him, declaring that the only way to free Matsumiya is to kill him. Thinking quickly, Kotoha pretends to be extremely shallow, making sure that Matsumiya hears and sees her slapping and berating Takeru, who quickly catches on to Kotoha's ruse and plays along. Matsumiya is heartbroken, severing Urawadachi's hold on him. The other Shinkengers arrive to offer assistance, and Shinken Yellow takes down Urawadachi before he is destroyed with the Tora Five Rings Bullet. While Tenku-Shinkenoh deals with the Ōzorananashi, the Ebi Origami and Ika Origami combine into Ika-Daikaioh to destroy Urawadachi's second life. After the fight, Matsumiya thanks Kotoha for saving his life and, seeing that she cares deeply for Takeru, parts ways with her amicably.
23	"The Rampaging Gedoushu"; Transliteration: "Bōsō Gedōshū" (Japanese: 暴走外道衆)	Yasuko Kobayashi	August 2, 2009
As Doukoku attempts to gain control of his summer-induced power boost, a legion of Ōnanashi attack with Tenku-Shinkenoh and Ika-Daikaioh destroying them off as the Sanzu River begins to flood into the mortal realm. With the Gedoushu becoming stronger during the summer, Jii reveals that the Shinkengers need the Inromaru to counter the increasing threat. Arriving at the Tengen Temple, the burial grounds of the Shiba House, the Shinkengers are given the Inromaru after Takeru visited the tombstone of his father. While the Shinkegers have tea, the rogue Ayakashi Gozunagumo makes his move as Takeru has been poisoned by Shitari. While the vassals are overpowered by Gozunagumo, Shitari appears and offers Takeru the antidote if he tells him the sealing character so Gozunagumo can use it on Doukoku. After attempting to get Juzo to sample his sushi, Genta arrives and fights Shitari and loses to him. At the last second, Juzo arrives and takes Takeru while exposing himself to Genta. Back on the Rokumon Junk, Doukoku awakens and drags Gozunagumo back to the boat as he punishes the Ayakashi for acting behind his back by infusing him with some of his new-found power.
24	"The True Samurai Combination"; Transliteration: "Shin Samurai Gattai" (Japanese: 真侍合体)	Yasuko Kobayashi	August 9, 2009
Entrusted with the Inromaru after Takeru gave it to Jokan prior to Shitari's attack, Genta has to complete the Inromaru while the vassals have their wounds tended to. On the Rokumon Junk, Shitari gains Doukoku's forgiveness as he gives Dayu the task of destroying Juzo while Gozunagumo loses his mind from being consumed by Doukoku's power. Meanwhile, Juzo forcefully cures Takeru of Shitari's poison, revealing his reasons were so he can fight Takeru at his full strength. From there, Juzo reveals how he became a Gedounin, and how he and Takeru are very much alike: acting outside of the norms of bushido to further their personal goals. The next day, Genta struggles in creating the Inromaru, having been given the Origami Disks of the other vassals, who head out to fight Gozunagumo to give Genta more time. It is just enough to allow him to complete it, getting Takeru and he bringing him to the fight with the Ayakashi, giving his friend the Inromaru. Takeru transforms and uses the Inromaru to transform into Super Shinken Red, slaying all of the Nanashi Company and Gozunagumo. When Gozunagumo resurrects with Ōnanashi, the Shinkengers use the Inromaru and the new True Samurai Gattai Disk to combine all of their personal Origami into Daikai-Shinkenoh to take out the Ōnanashi. When Gozunagumo uses two Ōnosakamata to blast them, the Shinkengers counter with Daikai-Shinkenoh using the IkaTenku Buster to destroy the Ayakashi. Takeru later returns to Tengen Temple to visit the tombstone of the Fuwa clan, thinking of Juzo's words about himself.
25	"The Dream World"; Transliteration: "Yume Sekai" (Japanese: 夢世界)	Yasuko Kobayashi	August 16, 2009
As Takeru prepares to duel with Juzo, Doukoku, furious with Dayu for not killing Juzo as he had commanded her to do, setting fire to her beloved shamisen when she was provoking him to kill her. A devastated Dayu flees into the mortal realm to search for ideal victims with which to repair her damaged instrument. She runs into Mako, and the two battle until the Ayakashi Yumebakura arrives. Yumebakura attempts to put Dayu into a deep sleep, but when the Shinkengers arrive, Dayu escapes. Shinken Pink and Shinken Yellow give chase. Genta arrives, but Yumebakura puts him to sleep, then uses him as a gateway to Dayu's location. This time, Yumebakura succeeds in sending Dayu, as well as Shinken Pink, into the Dream World. There, Mako discovers Dayu's past; she was once a human woman named Usuyuki. Obsessed with a man named Shinsa, who spurned her for another, Usuyuki crashed his wedding reception and set fire to the building, killing herself and everyone inside. Enraged that the dying Shinsa still favored his bride over her, Usuyuki pulled him to her, determined to have him be hers in death. As she fell to the Gedoushu, Usuyuki was reborn as Dayu and Shinsa was transformed into her shamisen. Meanwhile, Shinken Blue and Shinken Green enter the Dream World to bring Yumebakura back into the real world to awaken his victims and break his hold on them. Now that Mako knows her past, Dayu moves to kill her. Mako hesitates, so Kotoha jumps in to defend her and is injured. Shitari summons the Ōnanashi and Ōnosakamata, so Shinken Red and Shinken Gold form Daikai-Shinkenoh to fight them. Though victorious, the two Shinkengers are thoroughly exhausted from their battle. To make matters worse, Juzo shows up, intent on fighting Takeru, right then and there.
26	"Decisive Match Number One"; Transliteration: "Kessen Ōichiban" (Japanese: 決戦大一番)	Yasuko Kobayashi	August 23, 2009
After wounding Kotoha, Dayu takes her leave as Yumebakura retreats during his fight with Shinken Blue and Shinken Green. Juzo arrives for his duel with the worn out Takeru, though Genta attempts to reason with him. A company of Nanashi emerges and Juzo promptly slains them all before they can lay a hand of the humans, leaving to give Takeru time to heal, telling him that he'll go on a killing spree that it they don't fight him. While a debate occurs at the mansion over if Takeru should accept Juzo's challenge or not, with Ryunosuke the only one against it, Juzo talks with Dayuu, striking a nerve as she decides to live with her suffering to maintain her existence. The next day, with Ryunosuke finally understanding his reasons, Takeru heads out to duel Juzo when Yumebakura resurfaces. Given the Inromaru, Ryunosuke leads the Shinkengers in battle before becoming Super Shinken Blue to defeat the Ayakashi and use Daikai-Shinkenoh to destroy him with the IkaTenku Buster. While this occurs, Shinken Red and Juzo begin their duel to the death: despite being grievously injured, Shinken Red prevails as Juzo falls off a cliff. Takeru is taken back home by the vassals to celebrate their victory and tend to his injuries.
27	"The Switched Lives"; Transliteration: "Irekae Jinsei" (Japanese: 入替人生)	Yasuko Kobayashi	August 30, 2009
Chiaki and Kotoha go to pick up some sushi from Genta and tell him that Takeru is healing well from his fight against Juuzo. The Ayakashi Abekonbe, who transfers people's souls into inanimate objects, appears to terrorize the city. Shinken Green and Shinken Yellow engage him and are joined by their teammates. Afterwards, Chiaki and Kotoha discover that their teammates' souls have been imprisoned inside a Maneki Neko statue (Takeru), a piece of sushi (Genta), an electric fan (Mako), and a cheeky figural (Ryunosuke). Faced with the task of figuring out how to undo Abekonbe's curse without killing him, Chiaki and Kotoha devise a risky strategy for their next encounter with the Ayakashi. Shinken Green and Shinken Yellow successfully trick Abekonbe into switching bodies with Shinken Green and eventually force him to undo his curse; this comes just in the nick of time for Genta, who, as the piece of sushi, was about to be eaten by a hungry cat. Using the Inromaru, Super Shinken Green and Shinken Yellow use Daikai-Shinkenoh to destroy the enlarged Abekonbe. Afterwards, Genta remains traumatized by his brush with death, and Abekonbe's master emerges from the Sanzu River.
28	"The Lantern Samurai"; Transliteration: "Chōchin Samurai" (Japanese: 提灯侍)	Yasuko Kobayashi	September 6, 2009
Because of the events of the previous chapter, Genta has developed a paralyzing fear of sushi, rendering him unable to help his teammates when they are battling the Nanashi. The other Shinkengers try to encourage Genta to get past his phobia by each braving their own worst fears. Doukoku and Shitari receive a visit from Akumaro Sujigarano, who offers his aid; Doukoku is not impressed. Genta quits the Shinkengers, promising to provide his team with a replacement. The Shinkengers deal with two Nosakamata before Akumaro destroys the monsters and personally tests the Shinkengers' fighting skills. Confused that the Shinkengers are weaker than their predecessors, Akumaro intensifies the odds by creating a Kirigami which Takeru battles in Tenku-Shinkenoh as the vassals are overpowered by Akumaro. At the last second, Shinken Gold arrives with his newly created DaiGoyou to drive Akumaro off before enlarging DaiGoyou to take out the Kirigami. As the Shinkengers celebrate, Genta reveals that he had originally created DaiGoyou to replace him on the team and that he was nearly finished when Jii force-fed him sushi and cured him of his phobia. Ryunosuke points out that DaiGoyou acts more like an okapikki than like a samurai, causing DaiGoyou and Genta to start bickering.
29	"The Runaway Lantern"; Transliteration: "Iede Chōchin" (Japanese: 家出提灯)	Akatsuki Yamatoya	September 13, 2009
After getting into a fight with Genta over his methods resulting in him being fired for being too honest, a frustrated DaiGoyou runs away though Genta expects him to come back. After failing almost every interview because he's a lantern to show Genta up, DaiGoyou is found by Mako who tries to talk some sense into him. But after he flies off upon refusing to accept Genta's words about him, Mako is forced to join the others when the Ayakashi Dokurobou begins his attack with the team overwhelmed by the monster's shadow clones before real Dokurobou is forced to fall back as he was about to finish them off. After having her wounds tended to with the others, though Genta tells her not to meddle in his affairs, Mako finds a depressed DaiGoyou working at a yakitori cart. She then consoles him with the others watching nearby as Genta arrives and apologizes to DaiGoyou for not understanding. Once the two bury the hatchet, the Shinkengers and DaiGoyou confront Dokurobou and take all the clones with DaiGoyou's light with the real one being weakened by Shinken Gold before Super Shinken Pink finishes him off. Daikai-Shinkenoh and DaiGoyou battle the enlarged Ayakashi and overwhelm him with their teamwork before using the IkaTenku Buster to destroy him. The next day as they celebrate his return, though he attempted to control his impulses, DaiGoyou gets into another fight with Genta for not being honest with his feelings.
30	"The Manipulated Academy"; Transliteration: "Ayatsuri Gakuen" (Japanese: 操学園)	Daisuke Ishibashi	September 20, 2009
While fighting the Nanashi, the Shinkengers are astonished to find high school students interfering with the battle. Afterwards, Takeru notices that all the students attend the private Takashiro Academy, so he sends Ryunosuke and Kotoha, posing as a teacher and student respectively, and DaiGoyou to the school to investigate possible Gedoushu activity. The next day, Ryunosuke, drawing from previous experience, suspects that a couple of teachers are Gedoushu in disguise, but is proven wrong when he finds them in a trance just like the students from before. Ryunosuke soon suspects that Kotoha's new friend, Eri Takahashi, is the Gedoushu until she, too, becomes entranced. As Kotoha feels guilty about not being able to keep Eri safe, she suddenly notices that Eri has a thin white band around her wrist that was not previously there. Kotoha and Ryunosuke soon discover that all the affected students and teachers have the white bands on their wrists. DaiGoyou's light shows that all the bands are connected to a network of strings. When Ryunosuke tries to cut the strings, the Ayakashi Kugutsukai reveals himself. Shinken Blue and Shinken Yellow engage him as their teammates arrive to assist. Kugutsukai, however, summons the entranced students and teachers to serve in holding the Shinkengers off. Shinken Yellow uses her Modikara to help Super Shinken Blue take out Kugutsukai and free everyone from the trance. Shinken DaiGoyou and Ika-Daikaioh double team Kugutsukai before DaiGoyou destroys him. With the school saved, Ryunosuke and Kotoha say goodbye to everyone in Takashiro Academy.
31	"The Kyoryu Origami"; Transliteration: "Kyōryū Origami" (Japanese: 恐竜折神)	Yasuko Kobayashi	September 27, 2009
While Shitari worries about the recent events at the Rokumon Junk, he senses a presence and sees that the Kusare Gedoushu are still thriving. The next day in the mortal world, as Genta opens for business, he encounters a young nurse named Aya Yamasaki who pleas for the Shinkengers' aid. Taking her to the others when they were in the middle of a card game, the Shinkengers learn that a group of Gedoushu have taken a young hospitalized boy named Tatsuya Sakai hostage within the hospital. Upon their arrival, Genta stays outside the building with Aya as she eventually reveals it to be a trap. The Shinkengers make their way through the hospital's basement before being ambushed by the Kusare Nanashi. As Genta reveals that they expected the trap, the Shinkengers proceed to defeat the Kusare Nanashi when Shinken Red uses the Dinosaur Disk to transform into Hyper Shinken Red, battling with the Kyoryumaru. Being a step ahead of the Shinkengers, Azemidoro arrives with Tatsuya to force Aya to take Genta's Sushi Changer from him, kidnapping both Genta and Aya as extra insurance. Aya apologizes for helping Azemidoro, but Genta understands why she had done so as DaiTenku arrives to decimate the Kusare Gedoushu. Regaining his Sushi Changer, Shinken Gold joins Hyper Shinken Red in fighting Azemidoro while the other Shinkengers finish off the Kusare Nanashi. When Azemidoro assumes his second life, Shinkenoh and Daikaioh battle the Kusare Ayakashi and lose to him. Holding Daikaioh hostage, Hyper Shinken Red summons the Kyoryu Origami and forms Kyoryu-Shinkenoh to destroy Azemidoro. Soon after, as Aya and Tatsuya lose sight of them in an attempt to thank them, the Shinkengers head home.
32	"The Ushi Origami"; Transliteration: "Ushi Origami" (Japanese: 牛折神)	Yasuko Kobayashi	October 4, 2009
Waking up to find their Origami gone, Takeru and company find them with a boy who identifies himself as Hiro Sakakibara and reveals he has come from Mount Tsunobue to see Takeru. Recognizing the name of the place, Jii reveals it to be the site where Modikara came to be and also the birthplace of the first Origami: the Ushi Origami. But as it was too powerful to control, the Origami was sealed away within the mountain and gauarded by the Sakikibara clan. Hiro then presents to Takeru the disk that he believes can tame the Ushi Origami, but Takeru turns him down as there's a chance it won't work. When the Ayakashi Happouzu arrives to track down Hiro to undo the Tsunobue seal under Akumaro's orders, accidentally attacking a boy who found hid missing wallet, the Shinkengers arrive to fight him and the Nanashi with Shinken Gold's aid. After Happouzu escapes, the Shinkengers realize that the Gedoushu are after Hiro and decide to take Hiro to his home. At the Sakakibara residence, they learn from Touji Sakikibara, that Hiro is acting against his grandfather's orders before he runs off again with Genta sent to look after him. As Takeru and his vassals attempt to learn more about the Ushi Origami, Happouzu manages to get Hiro to release the Ushi Origami from its seal. When Hiro finds his disk has no effect, the Ushi Origami goes on a rampage. The Ōnanashi attempt to capture it, but the Shinkengers use Shinkenoh and Daikaioh to strike them down before attempting to restrain the Ushi Origami themselves. However, the Ushi Origami is too powerful for Shinkenoh to contend with as the Origami charges away with Hiro still trapped inside. While this occurs, Dayu finds a shattered piece of Juzo's katana Uramasa at the site of his defeat by Shinken Red.
33	"The Great Bull King"; Transliteration: "Mōgyūdaiō" (Japanese: 猛牛大王)	Yasuko Kobayashi	October 11, 2009
As the Ushi Origami continues its rampage, Dayu prepares to throw the broken blade of Juzo's Uramasa into the sea when Akumaro reveals that Juzo is still alive and he wishes the former samurai to work for him. He promises to repair her shamisen and Juzo's Uramasa in return. Later that night, Dayu finds Juzo to relay Akumaro's message to him. Meanwhile, after having no luck in finding the Ushi Orgami, Kotoha suggests to Takeru and the others to send the Origami to find Hiro who is still inside the Ushi Origami. By daybreak, the Origami return to Shinkengers as Toji gives Takeru a special Secret Disk to destroy the Ushi Origami. Sending the others ahead of him, Takeru learns that the old man sees the Ushi Origami to be responsible for the death of Hiro's parents. As he expresses his guilt that it is partly his fault that they died and that Hiro is in trouble, Takeru tells him otherwise and returns the Secret Disk to Toji. On their way to find Hiro, the Shinkengers are ambushed by Happouzu and several Nanashi. Takeru joins the battle and when both Dayu and Juzo arrive to hold the Shinkengers back, Shinken Red goes forward to find Happouzu ready to kill Hiro who tries to tame the Ushi Origami. However, the Origami begins its rampage again as Toji arrives to reveal that he too wished to control the Ushi Origami. Together, Hiro and Toji absorb the excess Modikara that drives the Ushi Origami wild before it destroys a nearby city. Super Shinken Red also destroys Happouzu, who has the intent to destroy the Ushi Origami now that it cannot be under his control. Given the reigns of the Ushi Origami, Super Shinken Red turns the Ushi Origami into Mougyudaioh, who slays the Ayakashi as Juzo and Dayu take their leave. Parting ways with the Sakakibara clan, Takeru and his vassals make their way home with a new Origami.
34	"Fatherly Love, Girlish Innocence"; Transliteration: "Oyagokoro Musumegokoro" (Japanese: 親心娘心)	Yasuko Kobayashi	October 18, 2009
The Shiba home has a visitor: Mamoru Shiraishi, Mako's father, and husband of Kyoko Shiraishi, the previous Shinken Pink. Mamoru asks Mako to quit the Shinkengers and move to Hawaii with him. Before Mako can answer, the Shinkengers must head to Takekuni to confront the Nanashi, who are attacking an elementary school and kidnapping children. During the melee, Shinken Pink manages to plant a gap sensor on a little boy before the Nanashi spirit him away. The Shinkengers learn more about Mako's childhood before Mamoru again tries to convince Mako to quit the team and move to Hawaii. The Shinkengers soon learn that Akumaro is holding the children in Yamai, where he intends to use them to help create dry riverbeds to receive the Sanzu River in the mortal realm. One of the children escapes, chased by a group of Nanashi. Mako rescues the boy, but is injured in the process. Shinken Red, Shinken Blue, and Shinken Green arrive to fight the Gedoushu while Shinken Gold and Shinken Yellow help the children to safety. Akumaro easily beats the five Shinkengers by himself. Mako wants to join the battle, but Mamoru is reluctant to let her. When Mako berates him for not being a good parent, Mamoru tells her exactly why he and Kyoko left Japan years ago, leaving Mako in the care of her grandmother. Mako firmly tells her father that she won't quit the Shinkengers and bears no grudge against her parents before she transforms and slays the Nanashi present and, after becoming Super Shinken Pink, defeats Akumaro. Enraged, Akumaro summons a Kirigami with an army of Ōnanashi and a pair of Ōnosakamata. Super Shinken Pink, piloting Shinkenoh, rides aboard Ushi Origami to defeat the Nanashi, and Daikaioh joins Shinkenoh and Mougyudaioh to destroy the Kirigami and the Ōnosakamata. Afterwards, Mamoru reunites Mako with Kyoko; mother and daughter embrace and let go of the past before Mamoru and Kyoko bid Mako goodbye and return to Hawaii.
35	"The Eleven Origami, The Complete Combination"; Transliteration: "Jūichi Origami Zen Gattai" (Japanese: 十一折神全合体)	Yasuko Kobayashi	October 25, 2009
As Genta points out the possible yet risky combination of their Origami with the Ushi Origami, Ryunosuke visits his old kabuki theater, reminiscing about his life before becoming a Shinkenger. On his way back to the Shiba House, he comes across the Ayakashi Futagawara terrorizing people and eating everything in sight. When he tries to transform, his Shodo Phone is eaten, leaving him to watch his comrades fight Futagawara and get overpowered before the Ayakashi takes his leave. Without his Shodo Phone, Ryunosuke goes back to the kabuki theater to watch his friend Shintaro practice for an upcoming performance that both were supposed to perform together until Ryunosuke became a Shinkenger. The next day, Futagawara resumes his feeding frenzy as the Shinkengers arrive to face him and attempt to regain Ryunosuke's Shodo Phone, However, Juzo and Dayu arrive to prevent the Shinkengers from defeating Futagawara, allowing the Ayakashi to eat even more. Elsewhere, Ryunosuke (in disguise) approaches Shintaro to inspire him to perfect the dance, and to make amends for what he feels is leaving his best friend to fight the Gedoushu. Having succeeded, Ryunosuke joins the others as Juzo and Dayu destroy Futagawara themselves to unleash his full power, with Shinken Red barely retrieving Ryunosuke's Shodo Phone before the Ayakashi grows to immense proportions and gains a shield to defend and attack with. The Shinkengers form Daikai-Shinkenoh, but they cannot break through Futagawara's shield. Shinken Blue uses this opportunity to convince Super Shinken Red to take out the All Samurai Gattai Disk and combine all of the Origami. As the Secret Disk is placed into the Inromaru, Shinken Blue activates its Modikara, allowing all of the Origami to combine into Samuraihaoh. With their newfound power, the Shinkengers break through Futagawara's wall-like shield and destroy him. After the battle, Ryunosuke watches Shintaro prepare for the kabuki performance and he intents to keep a vow to his friend that he will return to kabuki once the Gedoushu are finally defeated.
36	"The Curry Samurai"; Transliteration: "Karē Samurai" (Japanese: 加哩侍)	Akatsuki Yamatoya	November 1, 2009
When the Shinkengers go to have lunch at Gold Zushi, Kotoha asks Genta for curry. Genta is taken aback, but he prepares the dish and serves it. Kotoha finds the curry delicious, and it begins to attract attention and, more importantly, customers to Gold Zushi. When the Ayakashi Sogizarai attacks, Genta must leave the cart to help the Shinkengers battle him. Sogizarai's spinning attacks completely overwhelm the Shinkengers, but he dries out and is forced to retreat. After the battle, Takeru and the vassals visit Genta when a businessman offers to move him from the sushi cart to an actual restaurant. Genta thinks about the proposal, which causes Kotoha to feel guilty. The next day, Kotoha apologizes to Genta for mentioning curry in the first place, and the two talk about Genta's dream to have his own sushi restaurant. The businessman returns with the plans for the restaurant, which would sell only curry. Genta firmly rejects the offer just as Sogizarai returns to resume his assault on the city. The Shinkengers engage him, but are still unsure of how to deal with his spinning attacks until Shinken Yellow uses the Inromaru to become Super Shinken Yellow, countering Sogizarai's attacks with her own spinning attack. Shinken Gold then injures Sogizarai, and Super Shinken Yellow finishes him off. DaiGoyou then battles the enlarged Sogizarai, holding off the Ayakashi so Samuraihaoh can be assembled to destroy him. After the battle, Genta posts "no more curry" signs on his sushi cart, losing all of his new customers, to return to his true passion: making sushi.
37	"The Epic Glue Battle"; Transliteration: "Setchaku Daisakusen" (Japanese: 接着大作戦)	Daisuke Ishibashi	November 8, 2009
Responding to a Gedoushu attack, the Shinkengers encounter the Ayakashi Mochibetori. During the fight, Shinken Blue and Shinken Green get their hands glued together by the Ayakashi before Shinken Gold drives him off. After a few attempts to cut the glue off, the Shinkengers realize that defeating Mochibetori is the only way to separate Ryunosuke and Chiaki. Though the two men attempt to prove that they are able to fight in light of the literal sticky situation, they are told to stay behind. While Ryunosuke and Chiaki eventually get along, the others train to deflect Mochibetori's glue until the Ayakashi returns to glue every person he comes across to something or to each other. Following the others, Ryunosuke and Chiaki watch their teammates fall into Mochibetori's trap. With Ryunosuke following Chiaki, the two transform and manage to slay Mochibetori, negating the Ayakashi's glue. Daikaioh and Mougyudaioh arrive to hold back Mochibetori with DaiGoyou's support before they destroy him. Soon after, Ryunosuke and Chiaki are treated to an all you can eat buffet, unaware of how in synch they became from the ordeal.
38	"Showdown with the Rifle Squad"; Transliteration: "Taiketsu Teppōtai" (Japanese: 対決鉄砲隊)	Yasuko Kobayashi	November 15, 2009
Takeru tells his vassals that Hikoma will be leaving them for his yearly day off to visit the resting place of his wife and visit his daughter and granddaughter. But because the fight with the Gedoushu has gotten worse, Hikoma may not take his day off. Deciding to make sure Hikoma will have a good day, the Shinkengers replace the real Gap Sensor with a fake so Hikoma can enjoy himself. The next day, the Ayakashi Ikusazure appears with his gun squad for target practice as the Shinkengers arrive to fight them. Managing to drive the Gedoushu back, after getting Hikoma to leave, the Shinkengers carry out Hikoma's daily responsibilities until Ikusazure resumes his target practice. The Shinkengers use their speed to get close enough the Nanashi to take them out until Shinken Gold gets gunned down by the Nanashi reinforcements who overwhelm the rest of the team. At the last second, Hikoma arrives with the Mougyu Bazooka which Super Shinken Red uses to turn the tables, revealing that he knew of their attempt to give him a worry-free day off. Upgrading it to the Super Mougyu Bazooka, Super Shinken Red destroys Ikusazure. When the Ayakashi revives, Mougyudaioh and Shinken DaiGoyou fight him and his cannon wielding Ōnanashi. After enlarging the Mougyu Bazooka, Mougyudaioh dispatches the Ōnanashi before finally destroying Ikusazure. Later, Takeru brings Hikoma to see his daughter and her family.
39	"The Very Urgent First Aid Emergency"; Transliteration: "Kyūkyū Kinkyū Daishikyū" (Japanese: 救急緊急大至急)	Yasuko Kobayashi	November 22, 2009
After learning of possible Gedoushu activity on an island, the Shinkengers travel to investigate. After splitting up into three groups, Takeru and Mako and Genta and Chiaki are ambushed by villagers driven insane. Ryunosuke and Kotoha encounter a young boy who tells them of an ash causing an illness amongst the villagers, making them paranoid and blood-thirsty. When the two go to warn the others, they are ambushed by Dayu and knocked out. Elsewhere, Akumaro ambushes Genta and Chiaki, placing them under the influence of the ash that he has created, and Juzo attacks Shinken Red and Pink, noting that Takeru has become weaker upon valuing his life over that of fighting. This distracts him and allows Juzo to injure him until Mako takes him out of the battle and into safety. Still angered, he runs off to fight Juzo, again, with Mako in tow. They arrive at a mountain guarded by Juzo and Dayu that is producing the ash infecting the village. While Mako fights Dayu as Shinken Pink, Takeru transforms into Super Shinken Red to fight Juzo and free the island from the ash's influence. After destroying the source of the ash and breaking Akumaro's hold on the island, Akumaro takes Juzo and Dayu away, leaving a Kirigami and a pair of Ōnosakamata to keep the Shinkengers at bay. The group forms Daikai-Shinkenoh to fight the monsters and to destroy the Ōnosakamata, eventually needing to use Samuraihaoh to destroy the Kirigami. Having freed the island, the Shinkengers head back home, with Juzo's words still burning in Takeru's mind as Mako keeps a worried eye on her lord.
40	"The General Heads to the Front Lines"; Transliteration: "Ontaishō Shutsujin" (Japanese: 御大将出陣)	Yasuko Kobayashi	November 29, 2009
While training, Takeru almost hurts Chiaki while remembering Juzo's words from their last encounter. While this occurs, Doukoku has Shitari demand Dayu's shamisen from Akumaro. Akumaro takes Shitari to where he placed the instrument and then attacks him, revealing that he had allied himself with Doukoku as part of his plans. This causes Shitari to fall back and cause the Gap Sensor to detect his movement. Sensing her shamisen's cries, Dayu makes her way to Akumaro's location just as the Shinkengers arrive to fight him and are outmatched. Using the shamisen as a shield, Akumaro overpowers Dayu until an enraged Doukoku arrives in the mortal world to kill him and the Shinkengers even if he dies in the process from rapid dehydration. Akumaro loses the shamisen and escapes, leaving the Shinkengers to fight Doukoku. Super Shinken Red summons the Mougyu Bazooka to attack Doukoku, but the Gedoushu resists the attack long enough to defeat Super Shinken Red. After repairing Dayu's shamisen, the nearly dead Doukoku is dragged back into the realm of the dead by Shitari, who leaves an Ōnanashi Ōzutsu Squad to finish off the Shinkengers. Shinken Yellow tends to Takeru's wounds, leaving Super Shinken Blue in Daikai-Shinkenoh and Shinken Gold in Mougyudaioh to defeat the Ōnanashi. As a near-death Takeru is taken to the Shiba House, Doukoku is dropped into the depths the Sanzu River to regain his strength, leaving Akumaro to take over the Rokumon Junk with no opposition.
41	"The Sent Words"; Transliteration: "Okuru Kotoba" (Japanese: 贈言葉)	Yasuko Kobayashi	December 6, 2009
After surviving Doukoku's attack, and realizing the sealing character's importance, the vassals wonder how to deal with him and Akumaro. While this occurs, while looking over Takeru's condition and knowing that something is wrong, Kotoha receives a letter from her sister. The other vassals find her as they head out to get some sushi, though Kotoha now has doubts being dependant on the others. The Ayakashi Sunasusuri arrives, attacking people and inducing an insatiable appetite in those hit by his sand. After fighting the Nanashi, Shinken Yellow battles the Ayakashi by herself and loses as the others end up being affected by Sunasusuri's sand. Later that night, after the others are restrained so they do not eat everything in sight, Takeru wakes up and overhears Kotoha talking to Jii about him. The next day, Sunasusuri resumes his mission as Takeru heads off on his own. After Jii explains to Kotoha that her sister is encouraging her to be true Shinken Yellow, Kotoha arrives to aid Shinken Red, transforming into Shinken Yellow to battle Sunasusuri. She is unable to defeat him, but she uses the Inromaru to transform into Super Shinken Yellow and slays him to break his hold on the other Shinkengers. After Sunasusuri enlarges, the other Shinkengers arrive and form Samuraihaoh and destroy the Ayakashi while Saru Origami holds him off. Soon after, as Kotoha accepts her role as Shinken Yellow and, because of her, Takeru starts opening up again to the others.
42	"The Two-Hundred Year Long Ambition"; Transliteration: "Nihyakunen no Yabō" (Japanese: 二百年野望)	Yasuko Kobayashi	December 13, 2009
After Jii notices that the places that Akumaro attacked prior all form a straight line, Takeru becomes concerned as he and the others go through the Shiba archives for any clues. On the Rokumon Junk, Akumaro gives the Ayakashi Tsubotoguro the means to create the final marker. By then, Shitari realizes Akumaro's goal and attempts to reason with him as it would destroy them all. However, Akumaro shows no fear as he reveals that Juzo is an important tool in his plan. Unable to help out, Genta decides to make some sushi for the others as he finds DaiGoyou a tree for Christmas. When contacted by a Gedoushu attack, Genta arrives first to watch Tsubotoguro making people suffer with his pain insects and fights him until the others arrive and fight off the Nanashi. Akumaro arrives as Super Shinken Red charges at him. After being found out and sending Tsubotoguro to continue the plan, Akumaro fights the male Shinkengers as Super Shinken Red pursues Tsubotoguro with the female Shinkengers. As Super Shinken Red slays Tsubotoguro, an annoyed Juzo arrives to demand his Uramasa from Akumaro. As the enlarged Tsubotoguro's platoon are vanquished by Shinkenoh's armaments and the Ayakashi himself is destroyed by Daikai-Shinkenoh with the Ikatenku Buster, Akumaro reveals his plan to open the Gates of Hell by invoking the ancient Urami Gandōgaeshi spell that only a person like Juzo, a Gedounin, can complete. Though Juzo is reluctant at first, Akumaro reveals that Uramasa is made from the souls of the Fuwa clan and that only when the sword serves its purpose will their souls be freed. By then, a massive explosion of energy from the ceremony destroys the block that separates Earth and Hell, wounding the Shinkengers and Juzo with Dayu barely escaping as Akumaro makes his way to the slit that opens up the way to Hell.
43	"One Last Sword Stroke"; Transliteration: "Saigo no Hitotachi" (Japanese: 最後一太刀)	Yasuko Kobayashi	December 20, 2009
Coming to after the six shockwaves, Genta ponders killing Juzo to stop Akumaro and to ensure Takeru's safety. However, he changes his mind upon learning of the souls of Juzo's family sealed within Uramasa's blade. At the Shiba House, after Takeru suggests that slaying Juzo is the only way to keep, Genta reveals his actions to them before he takes his leave. The next day, the Shinkengers learn that Genta went out to track down Juzo, and Ryunosuke and Chiaki going after him as the others face Akumaro. Confronting Juzo yet not intending to fight him, Genta pleads with him not to take back Uramasa. However, as Juzo tries to kill him, Ryunosuke and Chiaki come to his aid. Chasing after Juzo as he regains Uramasa from Akumaro, the regrouped Shinkengers are unable to stop him with Akumaro in their way. But at the last second, Juzo strikes down Akumaro instead of the final marker. Akumaro is shocked as Juzo reveals that he knew the sword's true nature the entire time, and he thanks Akumaro for repairing it. Realizing his plans are ruined now that Juzo was now a true Gedoushu, Akumaro takes his rage on the Shinkengers as they slay him with the Rekka Daizantou and the Mougyu Bazooka. Akumaro enlarges and battles Mougyudaioh and DaiGoyou while Shinkenoh and Daikaioh destroy Kirigami Akumaro summoned. The Shinkengers then form Samuraihaoh to finish of Akumaro, only for the Modikara Great Shot Circle to have no effect against him. On Shinken Gold's suggestion, Super Shinken Red summons the Kyoryu Origami, with Samuraihaoh using the Kyoryuto to destroy Akumaro with the Twelve Origami Great Samurai Slash. After, the battle Genta now knows the true nature of the Gedoushu. When they all return to the Shiba House to find Jii and the Kuroko in the middle of decorating for Christmas, they help with the finishing touches.
44	"The Eighteenth Head of the Shiba House"; Transliteration: "Shiba Ke Jūhachidaime Tōshu" (Japanese: 志葉家十八代目当主)	Yasuko Kobayashi	January 3, 2010
At the Shiba House, everyone gathers for a New Years party, the first lively one in years. But while Jii provides calligraphy pens as his Otoshidama, he sees a strange Kuroko with a letter bearing the Shiba House crest. As the others practice, Takeru reads the letter and tells Jii that they will continue as planned and that he will handle it when the time comes. Meanwhile, at the deserted Rokumon Junk, Shitari is glad to see Dayu returning as he confirms to her that Doukoku sank into the Sanzu River and that he shall return once he finally fills up in the water. Until then, Shitari summons the Ayakashi Yomotsugari to kill off the eighteenth head of the Shiba House, giving her the Onibidama bullets to fight Shinken Red's Fire Modikara. When she attacks with a group of Nanashi to bring the Shinkengers into the open, Shinken Red is protected by the others against his wishes. Having had enough of his vassals getting in his way, Shinken Red uses the Inromaru to finish the fight, barely surviving as he slays the Ayakashi with the Mougyu Bazooka. Shitari is perplexed as to how Takeru has endured the Onibidama attacks as Shinken Red gives Shinken Blue the Inromaru to battle the revived Yomotsugari. The Shinkengers form Daikai-Shinkenoh to fight until Yomotsugari manages to disrupt the combination. The Sisi Origami suddenly attacks the Ayakashi on its own as the others realize that Takeru is not the one piloting it. After Yomotsugari is destroyed, the vassals help Takeru before seeing another Shinken Red, whose retainer Toshizo Tanba appears as well. That Shinken Red ends the transformation and is introduced by Tanba as the eighteenth head of the Shiba House: Kaoru Shiba.
45	"The Impersonator"; Transliteration: "Kagemusha" (Japanese: 影武者)	Yasuko Kobayashi	January 10, 2010
Finding Takeru wounded from his fight with Yomotsugari, Jii is shocked when Genta and the vassals arrive, demanding answers relating to Kaoru. With Jii not answering, Mako realizes that Takeru is a kagemusha as Kaoru enters and assumes her position as the true head of the Shiba House. Her retainer Tanba explains the full story behind Takeru being a lord and the eighteenth head of the Shiba House, while Kaoru is given the items belonging to Shinken Red, as she does not wish to hide anymore. The vassals refuse to serve anyone but Takeru, as he arrives and apologizes to them for all the suffering he caused and tells them to follow Kaoru before he takes his leave. The next day, Kaoru leads the Shinkengers against the Gedoushu and the four are barely able to cope with fighting on without Takeru. Genta finds Takeru who tells him that he has nothing left in his life before he walks away while Genta is not looking. As Genta calls Jii about his new attitude, Takeru makes his way to his father's grave where Juzo finds him. As he never cared who Takeru was, Juzo demands that they fight. Takeru accepts without hesitation.
46	"The Showdown Clash"; Transliteration: "Gekitotsu Ōshōbu" (Japanese: 激突大勝負)	Yasuko Kobayashi	January 17, 2010
As Takeru fights Juzo now that he has no more purpose in life as a stand in for Kaoru, Genta tells Jii as they attempt to find Takeru. Though the vassals offer to help, Jii apologizes for deceiving them and explains to an annoyed Tanba that he will see Takeru as his Lord. Jii finds him as he watches Shinken Red fighting Juzo and attempts to intervene. On the Rokumon Junk, Shitari risks his own life to empower Oborojime in order to increase the human suffering to speed up Doukoku's reawakening. Alerted to his presence, the Shinkengers arrive as Shinken Gold is overpowered by Oborojime. After managing to slay him with the Super Mougyu Bazooka, as Genta looks on in frustration, the Shinkengers use Tenku-Shinkenoh to destroy the powered-up Oborojime. However, the Ayakashi is revived into a more powerful form and Samuraihaoh is formed to battle it. Elsewhere, Jii explains to Takeru that while he raised him to be the kagemusha, he refuses to break his word to Takeru's father that he would look after his son. By then, Juzo arrives as Takeru resumes the fight against Jii's pleas. After the Shinkengers finally manage to destroy Oborojime, the vassals learn from Genta and Jii about Takeru's duel against Juzo. As the others run off, with a confused Ryunosuke remaining behind, Shinken Red and Juzo's duel reaches its climax.
47	"Bonds"; Transliteration: "Kizuna" (Japanese: 絆)	Yasuko Kobayashi	January 24, 2010
The epic duel between Shinken Red and Juzo reaches its climax. Dayu senses the conflict, as well as a premonition that Doukoku may soon reawaken. The vassals leave to find Takeru, but Ryunosuke stays behind, plagued with self-doubt. The kuroko Sakutaro Komatsu reveals himself to Ryunosuke and reminds him that only he can truly decide his own fate. By nightfall, a badly injured Shinken Red manages to deliver what seems to be a mortal blow to Juzo, but the Gedoushu revives, stating his ideology to Takeru. The other Shinkengers, sans Ryunosuke, arrive and tell Takeru that he has more to live for than he thinks. Juzo prepares to fight, but is shocked to discover that Uramasa has pinned his foot to the ground and will not budge. Ryunosuke arrives and helps his teammates take Takeru to safety as Juzo dies, lamenting that he's been denied his only pleasure. Uramasa remains planted upright in the ground as Juzo's body dissipates. Back onboard the Rokumon Junk, after learning of Juzo's death, Dayu realizes that her repaired shamisen may complete Doukoku's reawakening. The next day, as Uramasa fades away, Takeru tells his former vassals to leave him. Chiaki strikes him, much to the others' shock, and Ryunosuke reminds Takeru that he and the others had sworn their loyalty to him, not Kaoru. Mako then reminds Takeru that despite him not being the 18th Head of the Shiba House, everything Takeru built up as himself properly exists. Takeru, looking back at his memories with his vassals, explained that he feels the same, then starts to shed a tear. Suddenly, they receive a call that a group of Ōnanashi have appeared, and Kaoru, with Genta at her side, has already engaged them in Daikai-Shinkenoh. While the other vassals fight the Nanashi Company, and while an untransformed Takeru helps the kuroko bring civilians to safety, Shinken Pink confronts Dayu. Shinken Pink engages Dayu, and apparently strikes her down, but Dayu reveals that her shamisen had taken the killing blow and had been destroyed. Shinza's anguished soul, now finally free from its confinement within Dayu's shamisen, allows Doukoku to arise and invade the mortal realm.
48	"The Final Great Decisive Battle"; Transliteration: "Saigo no Daikessen" (Japanese: 最後大決戦)	Yasuko Kobayashi	January 31, 2010
Once awakened, after killing Dayu for no longer being the player whose music he loved, Doukoku demands to face Kaoru as she appears. As Kaoru readies the sealing character, Super Shinken Blue, Hyper Shinken Green, and the other Shinkengers keep Doukoku from her. Just as the vassals are defeated, Kaoru successfully unleashes the Sealing Character Gedou Seal on Doukoku. But the sealing character fails as Doukoku reveals that he absorbed Dayu's human aspect to protect himself. Doukoku nearly kills Kaoru, but Takeru covers their escape. Later that night, Kaoru requests a private audience with Takeru. Admiring him for having such loyal friends and seeing that the plan she was brought on for failed, Kaoru adopts Takeru as her son and successor, resigning as head of the Shiba House. This makes Takeru the nineteenth head of the Shiba House, and once more leader of the Shinkengers. Meanwhile, after Doukoku pays his final respects to Dayu, he begins his attack on the mortal realm as the Sanzu River overflows into the living world. With Takeru announcing a strategy of all-out battle, the Shinkengers march towards their final confrontation with renewed confidence.
49 (Final)	"A Samurai Sentai Eternally"; Transliteration: "Samurai Sentai Eien ni" (Japanese: 侍戦隊永遠)	Yasuko Kobayashi	February 7, 2010
As the Shinkengers battle thousands of Nanashi, Doukoku decides to break the Shinkengers' fighting spirit. While Shinken Gold and the vassals hold off the Gedoushu forces, Shinken Red attempts to use the Shiba House Disk on Doukoku. But Doukoku resists and becomes enraged that they refuse to show weakness to him. He then leaves the battle to attack and to kill Kaoru directly. Jii arrives to hold off the Nanashi, allowing the Shinkengers to recover and defeat them. Leaving DaiGoyou with Jii, the Shinkengers chase after Doukoku. They encounter Tanba, who gives them another Shiba House Disk, which Kaoru risked her well being to create, along with his own Twin Disk. Shinken Red uses the Twin Disk to summon a second Rekka Daizantou, and the Shinkengers manage to overpower Doukoku as Shinken Blue uses the Shiba House Disk to deliver the deathblow. Assuming his second life, an enlarged Doukoku overpowers the Shinkengers in Samuraihaoh. Under Takeru's guidance, Samuraihaoh charges Doukoku head-on, as he breaks off the Origami combinations until only Shinkenoh remains. Takeru then takes the opportunity to remind his vassals that no matter what happens, he is glad to have fought alongside them (a sentiment that the vassals return). The Shinkengers use all their Modikara in one grand finale attack, successfully destroying Doukoku for good. With Doukoku's demise, the Sanzu River withdraws from the mortal realm as Shitari goes down with the Rokumon Junk. Later, after Kaoru leaves him with the task of continuing the Shiba House's fight against the Gedoushu, Takeru bids farewell to his friends: Genta heads to Paris to make a name for himself in the cooking world; Kotoha returns home to Kyoto to take care of her sister; Chiaki leaves for college; Mako goes to live with her parents in Hawaii; and Ryunosuke resumes his kabuki career. Until the Gedoushu resurface, Takeru will remain on watch for them while Jii attempts to give his lord a hobby outside of being a samurai.
