= List of Kamen Rider Decade episodes =

This is a list of Kamen Rider Decade episodes. Following the first episode, every two episodes have taken place in an alternate dimension. The first nineteen episodes feature storylines based on the Heisei Kamen Rider Series. The latter half of the series features two story arcs that are original stories, a story arc serving as a crossover with Samurai Sentai Shinkenger, and two story arcs based on the Shōwa Kamen Rider Series. In addition to the 31 episodes, the story of Decade is also told in the films Kamen Rider Decade: All Riders vs. Dai-Shocker and Kamen Rider × Kamen Rider W & Decade: Movie War 2010.

On October 4, 2009, TV Asahi began a re-broadcast of the series from beginning to end at 6:30 am timeslot. When episodes 30 and 31 were rebroadcast on May 2 and 9, 2010, respectively, they were recut with some scenes extended and others cut, labeled as "Special Edition" (特別編, Tokubetsuhen) versions.

== Episodes ==
No.	Title	Directed by	Written by	Original release date
1	"Rider War"; Transliteration: "Raidā Taisen" (Japanese: ライダー大戦)	Ryuta Tasaki	Shō Aikawa	January 25, 2009
After Natsumi Hikari has a nightmare of every Kamen Rider being defeated by a figure called Decade, she helps her grandfather Eijiro deal with unsatisfied customers. The photographer, Tsukasa Kadoya, seems to be at fault, but he simply tells Natsumi the photos are bad because he does not belong in this world. After the argument, various holes in reality open, allowing the Orphnochs, Undead, Makamou, Worms, Imagin, and Fangires to start terrorizing their world. In the bedlam, she finds a corroded belt and book, recalling it as Decade's from her dream. She gives Tsukasa the belt and book, allowing him to transform into Kamen Rider Decade by using a card from the book and inserting it into the belt. Using other cards, he fights the various monsters that have invaded his reality by transforming into Kamen Riders Kabuto, Faiz, and Hibiki. Back in his own reality, Tsukasa is warned by Wataru Kurenai that his reality is being superseded by the nine previous Kamen Riders' realities. He must go to their worlds and defeat the other Kamen Riders to save his own world, while Wataru keeps it frozen in place. Back in the Hikari Studio, Eijiro reveals a large photo that shows another world. Stepping outside, Tsukasa finds himself in this world as a police officer while Kamen Rider Kuuga appears to aid the police against two Gurongi.
2	"The World of Kuuga"; Transliteration: "Kūga no Sekai" (Japanese: クウガの世界)	Ryuta Tasaki	Shō Aikawa	February 1, 2009
Arriving in the World of Kuuga, Tsukasa takes the guise of a policeman and watches Kuuga destroy a pair of Gurongi, La·Doldo·Gu and Me·Garido·Gi, before reverting to his human form, Yusuke Onodera. Tsukasa later destroys Go·Babel·Da as Decade, but is mistaken for a Gurongi by Yusuke and Ai. When Yusuke and Ai arrive at the Hikari Studio to discuss this strange Gurongi, Tsukasa offers Ai his help in solving the mystery behind the Gurongi's female targets and the location of their lair. On the foot of Mount Hitoki, the Gurongi's Lair, Tsukasa reveals he used Ai as bait to lure out the remaining Gurongi, revealing their plan to revive their leader before ruining their game. While attempting to destroy the Gurongi, Decade is attacked by Kuuga, who reveals he knows about Decade's mission and will stop him at all costs. Natsumi pleads for them to stop, recalling her dream in which Decade and Kuuga seemingly destroy each other. A dimensional rift occurs, and their fight is interrupted by the appearance of Kamen Riders KickHopper and PunchHopper.: This episode is a tribute to Kamen Rider Kuuga.
3	"Transcendence"; Transliteration: "Chōzetsu" (Japanese: 超絶)	Ryuta Tasaki	Shō Aikawa	February 8, 2009
After fending off the Hoppers who disappeared into another dimensional rift, Yusuke reveals he was told of Decade by a mysterious man. When Ai and her task force go to investigate Mount Hitoki, a black mist begins to rise from within, signaling the revival of N·Gamio·Zeda. Resurrected by the dimensional chaos, he uses his miasma to convert humans into Gurongi. While Yusuke saves Ai and takes her to the hospital, Tsukasa fights the Gurongi alone. A dying Ai requests Yusuke to overcome his angst and fight to protect everyone's smiles, and so Kuuga and Decade work together to destroy the remaining Gurongi. N·Gamio·Zeda, in a last effort, absorbs all the Gurongi to power himself up, but he is ultimately overpowered by both Decade and Kuuga, who destroy him with a combo attack. After returning to the hospital, Yusuke finds that Ai has died and vows to honor her dying wish, setting off on his own journey with a mysterious white bat following him. Meanwhile, Tsukasa and Natsumi return to the photo studio, preparing to leave for the next world in their journey.: This episode is a tribute to Kamen Rider Kuuga, continuing the events of Episode 2.
4	"Second Movement ♬ Prince Kiva"; Transliteration: "Dai Ni Gakushō ♬ Kiba no Ōji" (Japanese: 第二楽章♬キバの王子)	Osamu Kaneda	Shō Aikawa	February 15, 2009
Arriving in the World of Kiva, Tsukasa and company discover that the Fangires of this world have made a truce with the humans. However, when Tsukasa finds the Lion Fangire attacking a young woman, he transforms into Decade to fight him. Wataru, the King of the Fangire Race, witnesses this and becomes Kamen Rider Kiva to fight him with the aid of his Arms Monsters, forcing Decade to assume Kamen Rider Kuuga's Mighty, Titan, and Dragon Forms to counter. Yusuke manages to stop the fight, and the Swallowtail Fangire reveals that the young woman was actually a renegade Fangire. Yusuke reveals he has promised to help Wataru because he is uncomfortable with being the King. After meeting a mysterious man who is disgusted with the human/Fangire treaty, Tsukasa later encounters Kiva-la, who uses her power to send him into another world where he is attacked by Kamen Rider Kaixa. Back in the World of Kiva, after having fed on many humans, the Beetle Fangire arrives at Castle Doran with the intent to kill Wataru and take his place as the King.: This episode is a tribute to Kamen Rider Kiva.
5	"The Biting King's Qualifications"; Transliteration: "Kamitsuki Ō no Shikaku" (Japanese: かみつき王の資格)	Osamu Kaneda	Shō Aikawa	February 22, 2009
As Tsukasa is fighting against Kaixa in another dimension, the Beetle Fangire defeats Wataru and becomes the new Fangire king, claiming Kivat. After the new King dissolves the truce, Yusuke arrives to protect Wataru before the boy runs off. After Yusuke expresses his reasons for helping the dethroned boy, Wataru takes refuge in the Hikari Studio. After being caught up on current events, Tsukasa makes his way to Castle Doran to save Yusuke as the Beetle Fangire absorbs the Arms Monsters into himself. After destroying the Swallowtail Fangire, Decade encounters the Beetle Fangire, who assumes Kiva's DoGaBaKi Form. When their fight makes its way to Yusuke and Wataru, the boy finds his courage to overcome his Fangire impulses and declares himself the King once more. He takes back the Kiva power and helps Decade battle the Beetle Fangire, mortally wounding him with a Darkness Moon Break/Dimension Kick combo. Later, Tsukasa pays a final visit to the Kurenai manor to play a final song for the dying Beetle Fangire, whom he knew was the man he met earlier and is Wataru's father. Soon after, as Yusuke moves into the Hikari Studio with Kiva-la sneaking in, the group prepares to enter yet another world.: This episode is a tribute to Kamen Rider Kiva, continuing the events of Episode 4.
6	"Battle Trial: Ryuki World"; Transliteration: "Batoru Saiban Ryūki Wārudo" (Japanese: バトル裁判・龍騎ワールド)	Takao Nagaishi	Shō Aikawa	March 1, 2009
Upon arriving in the World of Ryuki, Natsumi goes to the Atashi Journal headquarters to learn about the world's Kamen Riders from its editor, Reiko Momoi. After Natsumi's arrival at the journal's offices, Reiko is mysteriously murdered, leaving Natsumi as the culprit as she had a small fork in her hand. Natsumi is arrested under suspicion of murder, and is to be sentenced with a Kamen Rider Trial: a system where Kamen Riders fight in the Mirror World to determine the outcome of criminal cases. Natsumi calls upon Tsukasa to be her lawyer, who meets with Shinji Tatsumi to hear what he knows of what happened to Reiko. As Shinji reveals that he is Kamen Rider Ryuki and he believes Natsumi was framed, his former friend Kamen Rider Knight is fighting in the Kamen Rider Trial, defeating several opponents. Shinji suggests to Tsukasa that he should fight as Decade in the Kamen Rider Trial to clear Natsumi's name. At the scene, he finds that Ren Haguro was also at the scene of the crime before he is brought into the Mirror World along with the sub-editor of the Atashi Journal: Kamata. Decade and Abyss' fight, however, is interrupted by Kamen Rider Impaler, and Abyss leaves to watch Decade's abilities. Elsewhere, Shinji confronts Ren, believing he is Reiko's real murderer, and he challenges him as Kamen Rider Ryuki. Their fight is also interrupted by Decade, having just defeated Impaler and now turning his sights on Knight, easily overwhelming him in Kiva's various forms with Shinji watching.: This episode is a tribute to Kamen Rider Ryuki.
7	"Super Trick of the Real Criminal"; Transliteration: "Chō Torikku no Shinhannin" (Japanese: 超トリックの真犯人)	Takao Nagaishi	Shō Aikawa	March 8, 2009
After defeating Knight, Decade is about to finish him off when Ryuki pleads with him not to deliver the final blow, as he feels Knight must answer for his crime by his hand. However, Abyss uses this time to make his move to take out all three Riders at once, forcing them to retreat with Ren refusing to answer Shinji as he leaves. After her brief encounter with Narutaki, Natsumi learns that Shinji and Tsukasa are convinced that Ren is Reiko's murderer, although Yusuke sees otherwise. Meanwhile, a wounded Ren battles Kamen Rider Odin and defeats him, emerging from Mirror World with Odin's Time Vent as Shinji and Yusuke find him. Learning that Ren obtained the card to save Reiko, Shinji uses the card to go back in time as Tsukasa holds Abyss off. Arriving seconds before Reiko's death, Shinji and Tsukasa manage to save Reiko with the latter cornering her true murderer, Kamata. Despite this, Kamata arrives and absorbs his past self before becoming Abyss and unleashing his monsters on Decade. After learning the truth behind Ren coming to the Atashi Journal and why he left, a relieved Shinji runs to Tsukasa's aid. Though the two manage to defeat Abyss together, they learn from Narutaki that Kamata is actually an Undead as the two depart. After he receives Shinji's photo of himself and Yusuke, Tsukasa and company enter the World of Blade.: This episode is a tribute to Kamen Rider Ryuki, continuing the events of Episode 6.
8	"Welcome to Blade Cafeteria"; Transliteration: "Bureido Shokudō Irasshaimase" (Japanese: ブレイド食堂いらっしゃいませ)	Hidenori Ishida	Shōji Yonemura	March 15, 2009
Arriving in the World of Blade, Tsukasa assumes the disguise of the Chief Waiter of the BOARD Corporation, an organization whose agents become Kamen Riders to battle the Undead. When the Elephant Undead goes on the attack, Sakuya Hishigata battles the Undead as Kamen Rider Garren as Kazuma Kendate arrives and transforms into Kamen Rider Blade. When the Capricorn Undead joins the fray, Tsukasa joins the fight, dispatching the Elephant Undead using Ryuki's powers. Afterwards, Natsumi and Yusuke meet BOARD's president Hajime Shijo, who decides to promote Tsukasa to the rank of King while Kazuma Kendate is demoted from Ace to 7 and Mutsuki Kuroba is promoted from King to Ace, thereby becoming Kamen Rider Leangle. As a result, he is forced to work under Tsukasa in the cafeteria. When he is forced to give up the Blay Buckle after being demoted a second time, Kazuma refuses and runs off. Just as Tsukasa tries to convince Kazuma to do the right thing, Kamata arrives and attacks them as the Paradoxa Undead. As Decade battles the Paradoxa Undead with the Capricorn Undead backing him up, Kazuma becomes Blade and fights Garren and Leangle. However, both fights are interrupted with the appearance of Kamen Rider Chalice, who takes the Blay Buckle off of Kazuma and takes out the other Riders before fighting Decade one-on-one.: This episode is a tribute to Kamen Rider Blade.
9	"Blade Blade"; Transliteration: "Bureido Burēdo" (Japanese: ブレイドブレード)	Hidenori Ishida	Shōji Yonemura	March 22, 2009
Decade continues his fight with Chalice, with Garren losing his Garren Buckle in the process. The fight comes to a sudden halt when Kamen Rider Todoroki shows up. Back at BOARD, Hishigata is demoted to Rank 3 while Kazuma is fired from BOARD. After he understands Tsukasa's intent to help him, Kazuma stays on in the kitchen as he opens the Ace Lunch to all BOARD members. Meanwhile, Mutsuki and Hishigata search for Chalice to get back the Rider systems, and are subsequently ambushed by Chalice, who knocks them out after they find out his true identity. After hearing that the two have supposedly resigned from the company, Kazuma decides to find Hajime with Yusuke's help. As Tsukasa meets a mysterious figure who recognizes him, Kazuma and Yusuke arrive too late to save Hishigata and Mutsuki as Hajime uses the created card from the Rider Systems to become the Joker, revealing his reasons to Kazuma. Decade arrives as Ryuki with the Blay Buckle and gives Kazuma the resolve to fight back. Once Kazuma becomes Blade, he and Decade destroy the two Undead together. Soon after parting ways with Kazuma, Tsukasa and company begin their next venture into the World of Faiz.: This episode is a tribute to Kamen Rider Blade, continuing the events of Episode 8.
10	"Faiz High School's Phantom Thief"; Transliteration: "Faizu Gakuen no Kaitō" (Japanese: ファイズ学園の怪盗)	Takayuki Shibasaki	Shō Aikawa	March 29, 2009
Upon arriving in the World of Faiz and once more encountering the mysterious Daiki Kaito, Tsukasa finds himself in a school uniform and enrolled at Smart Brain High School. He learns that the high school is attacked on a nightly basis by beings called the Orphnoch, with only Faiz to protect the school. Daiki challenges Tsukasa to find out who Faiz is, and Tsukasa then challenges the Lucky Clover clique to a tennis match to see if any of them are Faiz. He beats them, learning that they are Orphnoch who are also after Faiz, and is forced to become Decade, using Blade's power against them. However, Decade is outclassed when Momose appears as the Tiger Orphnoch and warns him to back off. Daiki then confronts the group, giving them a hint as to who Faiz is before going off. Then, the Lucky Clover members target Yuri Tonoda and Takumi Ogami, believing Yuri is Faiz until Takumi transforms and fights them off. When Tsukasa learns that Yuri is the target, he goes off to fight the Orphnoch, watching Faiz get defeated and losing the belt. The fight is then interrupted by Daiki Kaito who transforms into Kamen Rider Diend while revealing he used the Lucky Clover to take the belt for himself. Once the Centipede Orphnoch is destroyed, Decade and Diend have a stand off over the Faiz Belt as Momose attacks Yuri as the Tiger Orphnoch only to meet his match with Takumi who transforms into the Wolf Orphnoch to protect his friend.: This episode is a tribute to Kamen Rider 555.
11	"555 Faces, 1 Treasure"; Transliteration: "Faizutsu no Kao, Hitotsu no Takara" (Japanese: 555つの顔、１つの宝)	Takayuki Shibasaki	Shō Aikawa	April 5, 2009
After Tsukasa recovers the Faiz Gear, he learns Diend's reasons for wanting the belt before Takumi regains it so he and a shocked Yuri can escape on the Autovajin. However, as he exposed himself as the Wolf Orphnoch to protect her only to be forsaken, a saddened Takumi attempts to dispose of the Faiz Gear into the river. Managing to save the Gear while following him, Tsukasa returns to the photo studio where he put Yuri's confusion at ease. The next day, Daiki attacks Takumi to get the belt from him, nearly killing him when Tsukasa arrives with it. Refusing to take Tsukasa's words of something more precious than the Faiz Gear seriously, Daiki takes Decade's Ride Booker, and Narutaki takes advantage of the situation as he takes Tsukasa into another dimension to be killed by Kamen Rider Ryuga. However, after interrogating Kiva-la on the whereabouts, Daiki intervenes while claiming it was to get the Faiz Gear as he gives Tsukasa back the Ride Booker. While this occurs, the remaining Lucky Clover members start taking over the school to sire more of their kind until Takumi arrives to fight them in Orphnoch form. Though no match, Takumi attempts to protect Yuri's camera until Tsukasa arrives as he regains Faiz's Ride Cards. Decade and the Wolf Orphnoch are outmatched until Daiki arrives with the Faiz Gear and gives it to Takumi. The two transform and destroy the Dragon and Lobster Orphnoch. However, the Tiger Orphnoch revives his followers, and Decade counters with the Final Attack Ride Faiz Blaster, destroying him and his followers in one shot. As Takumi and Yuri rekindle their friendship, Daiki steals the Orga Belt from the ruins of the school, and Tsukasa follows him to the World of Agito.: This episode is a tribute to Kamen Rider 555, continuing the events of Episode 10.
12	"Reunion: Project Agito"; Transliteration: "Saikai Purojekuto Agito" (Japanese: 再会 プロジェクト・アギト)	Takao Nagaishi	Shō Aikawa	April 12, 2009
Upon arriving in the World of Agito, Yusuke is shocked that there are Gurongi in the world which are being dealt with by Kamen Rider G3-X. He is further shocked when he sees an interview with Toko Yashiro, who is physically identical to the Ai Yashiro that died back in the World of Kuuga. Arriving at the police station, Yusuke offers to be the new user of the G3-X suit, but loses the position to Kaito. While this occurs, finding himself in a mailman outfit with a letter to Shoichi Ashikawa, Tsukasa and Natsumi find the man before they are attacked by what they think to be a Gurongi. But during the fight, Tsukasa realizes he is fighting an Unknown, an Ant Lord called Formica Pedes. After destroying the Ant Lord, Shoichi refuses the letter before he and Tsukasa dodge an attack meant for him by a mysterious Unknown. Later that night, as Tsukasa reads the letter's contents, Yusuke leaves the Hikari Studio to remain in the World of Agito with Toko. The next day, Kaito is deployed as G3-X to take out the Gurongi with Yusuke supporting him. During the fight, Kaito takes off the armor to finish the Gurongi off as Diend, revealing that he only became G3-X for his own agenda. Though he destroys Me·Ginoga·De, Xu·Mevio·Da attempts to run off only to destroyed by a couple of Formica Pedes. While this occurs, Tsukasa finds Shoichi and offers protection, only to see him transform into Kamen Rider Exceed Gills. Tsukasa attempts to restrain him as Kiva in Garulu Form. Gills, in pain of sensing the Ant Lords' attack, runs off and destroys them both before Yusuke's eyes. When Diend targets Gills, Decade tries to protect him, only to have his belt stolen by Gills with no defense against Diend's summoned Delta's Lucifer's Hammer finisher.: This episode is a tribute to Kamen Rider Agito.
13	"Awakening: Tornado of Souls"; Transliteration: "Kakusei Tamashii no Torunēdo" (Japanese: 覚醒 魂のトルネード)	Takao Nagaishi	Shō Aikawa	April 19, 2009
After Yusuke saves Tsukasa from Delta's attack, Gills is about to fight when he's overcome with pain as the Unknown shows up to kill him. As Shoichi escapes, Toko recognizes him via G3-X's camera. While Tsukasa insists on protecting an annoyed Shoichi, Yusuke reports the defeat of the Gurongi and the emergence of the Unknown. He finds Toko saddened, but has little time to help her as Kaito takes the G4 chip stored within his locker. Yusuke demands the chip back, but during the struggle, Toko blasts the chip to bits and a disappointed Kaito leaves. The next day, as Tsukasa continues to keep Shoichi safe from the Unknowns' attack, Yusuke learns that Shoichi was the original user of the G3 suit when he receives the letter for Shoichi from Toko. As Gills fights the Buffalo Lord Taurus Ballista, Yusuke arrives in the G3-X suit to make Shoichi realize that Toko knew the truth and it was the reason for creating the G3-X suit. Diend arrives to selfishly aid them with Blade's power until Ballista arrives. But Tsukasa shows up to state the Buffalo Lord's ideological flaws as Shoichi awakens as Agito. As Diend takes his leave, Decade, Agito, and G3-X battle Ballista and Formica Regia before the latter is destroyed by Agito. After turning Agito into the Agito Tornador, Decade and G3-X ride on the hoverboard to finish the Lord off. Soon after, Yusuke gives Toko his thanks as he says goodbye to her, and Shoichi returns to resume his place by Toko's side as Agito. As Kiva-la is happy to see Yusuke returning to the Studio, the gang ends up in another world: the World of Den-O.: This episode is a tribute to Kamen Rider Agito, continuing the events of Episode 12.
14	"Cho-Den-O Beginning"; Transliteration: "Chō Den'ō Biginingu" (Japanese: 超・電王ビギニング)	Hidenori Ishida	Yasuko Kobayashi	April 26, 2009
When the Hikari Studio appears in the World of Den-O, Tsukasa finds himself dressed in a strange detective-like attire with possession of a Rider Pass. He is then suddenly possessed by an Imagin, who battles a Mole Imagin as Kamen Rider Den-O. After taking out the Imagin, the possessed Tsukasa walks off until Natsumi uses her pressure point move to drive the Imagin out of him. When the Imagin known as Momotaros tries to possess Tsukasa, again, he throws Yusuke in front of him and Yusuke becomes possessed. After easily overcoming M-Yusuke and treating him to pudding for answers, Tsukasa learns that the Imagin lost his physical form some time before they arrived. The possessed Yusuke then runs out of the Hikari Studio to go after the other Mole Imagin with Tsukasa and Natsumi close behind as they look for the DenLiner to solve the mystery. However, Urataros, Kintaros, and Ryutaros possess Tsukasa and chase after Natsumi for answers. When Tsukasa forces the three out and they enter Natsumi to fight him, Decade uses Agito's power on each form while a mysterious Kamen Rider-like figure and his lackies attack a group of delivery men, with the Alligator Imagin taking advantage of the chaos. When a dimensional rift sends Decade and Den-O into the dimension where Natsumi saw the Rider War, the two Kamen Riders reach a stalemate as they are picked up by the DenLiner. While the DenLiner's Owner realizes that they have to work together, Yusuke and Momotaros as Den-O are in a losing battle against Diend with Narutaki as witness.: This episode is a tribute to Kamen Rider Den-O.
15	"Here Comes Super Momotaros!"; Transliteration: "Chō Momotarosu, Sanjō!" (Japanese: 超モモタロス、参上!)	Hidenori Ishida	Yasuko Kobayashi	May 3, 2009
After getting on the DenLiner, Tsukasa takes pictures of the DenLiner's gang before the Taros. But after Kohana sets the three Imagin in their place, they suddenly find the Hikari Studio as the front car. Kohana explains to Natsumi about the Imagin's new attack pattern as well as Momotaros, who Tsukasa decides to find. After surviving his confrontation with Diend and taking out another Mole Imagin, M-Yusuke tends to his injuries as Tsukasa finds him and scolds him for being an idiot. M-Yusuke senses the Imagin boss, and he and Tsukasa chase after the Alligator Imagin until he reveals himself. Using the Mole Imagin to cover his escape into the past, the Alligator Imagin battles Den-O and Decade, using the former's own DenGasher against him. After Decade saves Den-O's life and attempt, Diend makes his presence known with his Riotroopers holding the Alligator Imagin at bay as he once more offers Momotaros a physical form as a DenLiner. But Decade takes the card, poorly defending Momotaros and giving him back his sense of self as he regains access to Den-O's powers. As the Alligator Imagin destroys the Riotroopers, Decade uses the modified Den-O Final Form card to give Momotaros back his original physical form. After a misunderstanding from Yusuke, Decade gives Momotaros the power to execute his Decade Version Extreme Slash with Kuuga Gouram. As Momotaros returns to the DenLiner, only to receive a violent welcome back from the gang, Tsukasa and company were about to enter the World of Kabuto when they get an unexpected visit from the Imagin Sieg. With a manuscript on Sieg's person, it appears that the adventures in the World of Den-O are far from over.: This episode is a tribute to Kamen Rider Den-O, continuing the events of Episode 14, and leading up to the events of Cho Kamen Rider Den-O & Decade Neo Generations: The Onigashima Warship.
16	"Warning: Kabuto Running Amok"; Transliteration: "Keikoku: Kabuto Bōsōchū" (Japanese: 警告：カブト暴走中)	Naoki Tamura	Kenji Konuta	May 10, 2009
After helping the DenLiner gang in the past, Tsukasa and company begin their venture in the World of Kabuto. Posing as a ZECT Trooper, Tsukasa is deployed to aid Bright Troopers in the containment of a Worm as Kamen Riders Gatack and TheBee manage to exterminate it with the unseen aid of Kabuto. Soon after, Tsukasa brings Arata to the Studio to explain about his world, only to find a Worm had mimicked Tsukasa's form. After Natsumi uses the pressure point to expose one of the Tsukasas as a Worm, Decade fights it before it attacks a girl and is destroyed by Kabuto. Deciding to investigate the girl Mayu, they host a photo shoot for her, and Natsumi learns of Mayu's older brother who was supposedly killed by Kabuto. At ZECT's headquarters, TheBee's user, Sou Otogiri, tells Arata that the final prepation for the plans to capture Kabuto are nearly done. Tsukasa talks with Mayu more about her brother after attempting to help at her grandmother's oden shop, the Heaven House, and when walking back to the Hikari Studio they are attacked by a Geophilid Worm. Tsukasa destroys it as Kuuga Pegasus Form, and is then attacked by TheBee and Gatack. After being unable to use Den-O's powers against the Riders, Decade is eventually assisted by Diend who fights Gatack to gain his Clock Up system while TheBee and Decade battle, eventually becoming Faiz in Axel Form to match TheBee's Clock Up. When Decade realizes Mayu is in the same area being attacked by Worms, he goes off to save her but is intercepted by an attack from TheBee. Just as TheBee's stray shots are within inches of Mayu, Kabuto arrives to save her from both the attack and the Worms, disappearing as everyone's transformations end. However, when Mayu sees Sou, she recognizes him as her brother.: This episode is a tribute to Kamen Rider Kabuto, taking place after the events of Cho Kamen Rider Den-O & Decade Neo Generations: The Onigashima Warship.
17	"The Grandma Way of Taste"; Transliteration: "Obaachan Aji no Michi" (Japanese: おばあちゃん味の道)	Naoki Tamura	Kenji Konuta	May 17, 2009
Believing that TheBee's user is her brother, Mayu attempts to look for him with Natsumi's aid until they are attacked by a Worm. Counting on Kabuto to save them, Diend fights him to acquire his Clock Up system, summoning Ixa and Psyga to hold him down before Kabuto defeats them and runs off. By the time Tsukasa finds Natsumi and Mayu, the latter is shocked that she became a Worm as she runs off. She runs into Sou who reveals himself as the Phylloxera Worm and brings her to ZECT HQ as part of the Kabuto Capture plan, much to Arata's dismay before he is beaten to a bloody pulp questioning the plan. After escaping, Arata makes his way to Tsukasa and reveals the plan to him, confirming Tsukasa's notion. Kabuto falls for the trap as the Clock Down takes effect while the Worms reveal themselves among the ZECTroopers, with Sou exposing Kabuto as Mayu's real brother Souji. Tsukasa arrives and reveals the truth behind the Phylloxera Worm to Mayu while explaining that Souji and Mayu are still family regardless of the latter being a Worm. But believing he has the advantage, the Phylloxera Worm sics his Worm minions on Tsukasa. Souji frees Mayu and joins Tsukasa as they assume their Rider forms to finish off the Salis Worms before forcing the Phylloxera Worm into the open. Decade and Kabuto finish him off, but the tower projecting the Clock Down waves is destroyed in the process, forcing Souji to fade back into Clock Up space with Mayu watching. After taking Mayu home and giving Daiki a "treasure" for his trouble, Tsukasa and company begin the final phase of their journey. But as they deal with two Kiva-las fighting over which of them is fake, the real Kiva-la is with Narutaki as he decides to personally deal with Decade in the final world, the World of Hibiki.: This episode is a tribute to Kamen Rider Kabuto, continuing the events of Episode 16.
18	"Idle Hibiki"; Transliteration: "Saboru Hibiki" (Japanese: サボる響鬼)	Takayuki Shibasaki	Shōji Yonemura	May 24, 2009
Arriving in the last world, the World of Hibiki, Tsukasa and company begin the search for Kamen Rider Hibiki when they are ambushed by the Makamou Kappa. An Oni in training named Asumu battles the monster until Decade uses Kabuto's powers to destroy it. On learning he is Hibiki's pupil, Tsukasa has Asumu bring him to his mentor. Upon seeing Tsukasa, Hibiki, who is shirking off from his duties as an Oni, believes him to be the legendary Ongekidō Grand Master. Meanwhile, Zanki slays a band of Bakeneko as Ibuki arrives to take them out as well. But when the last Bakeneko escapes them, Decade destroys it with the two groups as witness. Tsukasa visits Ibuki's school afterwards and talks with Ibuki and Akira about three special scrolls. Meanwhile, after failing to rob Hibiki as he takes his leave, Daiki is forced into becoming Asumu's mentor. Like Tsukasa, Daiki learns of the three scrolls of the Oni classes, and he convinces Asumu to become Hibiki's pupil again, before taking his leave to Zanki's dojo where he offers a proposition. Returning to find Hibiki and Asumu attacked by a Tengu, Kuuga attempts to battle the Makamou. At the same time, Natsumi encounters Narutaki as he reveals Tsukasa's actions actually doomed the worlds rather than saved them. When Kuuga is nearly killed, Hibiki assumes his Oni form to destroy the Tengu before he suddenly transforms into the monstrous Gyuki. While this occurs, the Ibuki School and Tsukasa receive a challenge from Zanki's School and Daiki with the scrolls on the line. With them representing the two Oni schools, Decade and Diend do battle. But once Diend reveals his intentions to steal both scrolls, he summons Momotaros who attacks the Oni Kamen Riders until Gyuki storms in and overwhelms the Oni. The episode ends with Decade using Ryuki's powers to take on the Makamou.: This episode is a tribute to Kamen Rider Hibiki.
19	"Ending Journey"; Transliteration: "Owaru Tabi" (Japanese: 終わる旅)	Takayuki Shibasaki	Shōji Yonemura	May 31, 2009
Using Ryuki's powers, Decade battles Gyuki while Ibuki and Zanki argue whose fault this was. When Akira and Todoroki join the fray in their Oni forms to save Asumu as he tries to protect them, with Decade joining them by using Den-O's Ax Form, they manage to defeat Gyuki. He runs off before regressing to Hibiki, and Yusuke and Natsumi find him shortly after. Later that night, after talking to Asumu, Akira and Todoroki confront their mentors to put aside their differences, with Tsukasa supporting them. Ibuki and Zanki promote them to the role of new teachers of their respective schools. Meanwhile, Hibiki reveals the nature of Gyuki to Yusuke and Natsumi as Daiki arrives to claim the last scroll. Hibiki stops him and gives Daiki his Onsa to give to Asumu with a final request. The next day, after suffering a Narutaki-induced vision of the future resulting from their actions, Natsumi finds Daiki, who uses Asumu as his cover to steal the final scroll. But as Tsukasa arrives, Daiki evokes Hibiki's final change into Gyuki to Asumu's horror, and the thief leaves them. After learning the secret of the three scrolls to be all schools as one, Daiki returns to give Asumu the Onsa. Asumu becomes Kamen Rider Hibiki in order to honor his mentor's final request: slay the Makamou to free Hibiki's soul. However, Narutaki arrives on a giant Bakegani (summoned with the help of Kamen Rider Ouja), with Todoroki and Amaki showing up shortly after. Once Diend destroys the scrolls, revealing that the true Ongekidō is all three styles in harmony, Decade regains Hibiki's powers. Decade, Diend, and the Oni all finish the Makamou off together. After Asumu and company thank Daiki for uniting the schools, Tsukasa and company return to Natsumi's world with Natsumi a bit worried.: This episode is a tribute to Kamen Rider Hibiki, continuing the events of Episode 18.
20	"The World of Negatives' Dark Riders"; Transliteration: "Nega Sekai no Yami Raidā" (Japanese: ネガ世界の闇ライダー)	Ryuta Tasaki	Toshiki Inoue	June 7, 2009
With their tour of the nine Kamen Rider Worlds complete, the Hikari Studio group returns to their home world, finding it as it was before the monsters appeared. Tsukasa is the only one who feels something is not right and questions the reason for the journey. Before Yusuke or Natsumi can attempt to answer, they encounter the violinist Otoya Kurenai, who thanks them for saving the world and tells Tsukasa that he earned a world of his own for his journey. As Natsumi goes out to see her TG Club friends and teacher for a high school reunion, Tsukasa and Yusuke have a short encounter with Narutaki who congratulates him on getting his own world. Later, Tsukasa becomes the ten-thousandth customer in a restaurant and wins both a free meal as well as a vast fortune. Tsukasa enjoys the upper class lifestyle until he takes his leave during an arranged marriage meeting. Yusuke is forced to take his place, but he runs off upon realizing that the women are actually monsters in disguise. Elsewhere, while hanging out with her TG Club friends, Natsumi tries to figure out where her friend Chinatsu is, and the TG Club members take the opportunity to run off, with the teacher attacking a couple as Alternative. Tsukasa runs into Otoya who mentions a treasure before transforming into Dark Kiva and challenging him, along with the other members of the TG Club who become Ryuga, Dark Kabuto, and Orga. With Diend arriving to back him up for this treasure, Decade battles Dark Kiva. When Decade attempts to use his Final Attack Ride against Dark Kiva, the attack suddenly cancels as he falls and reverts to human. As the dark Riders leave, Tsukasa realizes that all of his Rider cards have turned black. Elsewhere, Natsumi is still searching for Chinatsu when she passes by someone in dirty and ragged clothing who turns out to be another Natsumi.: This episode is a tribute to various Dark Riders from throughout the Heisei era.
21	"The Walking All-Rider Album"; Transliteration: "Aruku Kanzen Raidā Zukan" (Japanese: 歩く完全ライダー図鑑)	Ryuta Tasaki	Toshiki Inoue	June 14, 2009
After Tsukasa suddenly loses his powers, he learns from Kaito that he is actually in the World of Negatives. He later is seen by a talent agent and is offered to be signed onto his agency to become an idol. Although Yusuke acts as the voice of reason, he gets caught up in the fame seeking as well. Meanwhile, after her school friends return while waiting for Chinatsu, Natsumi that suggests that they should dig up the "treasure" they buried together, only to find that a parking lot was built over it and learning that Chinatsu moved their treasure prior. Once, Tsukasa finds Natsumi, he attempts to tell her that they are not in the real world, but Natsumi refuses to accept this as she runs off to the TG Club's hideout where she also meets the World of Negatives's Natsumi. Confirming that Tsukasa is right and revealing that the world is a heaven for monsters with only a few survivors left in hiding. Furthermore, the Dark Riders had murdered the real TG Club members' Negative counterparts and assumed the males' identities with the other Natsumi the only survivor. It is then that the Dark Riders arrive to further prove the other Natsumi's words as they force her to dig up the Dark Riders' treasure she buried: the K-Touch. Otoya is prepared to give it to Tsukasa so he can become the Ultimate Rider until Diend intervenes by attacking the Dark Riders. Though Otoya offers him the world on a silver platter, Tsukasa refuses and he regains his powers. Using the K-Touch, Tsukasa transforms into Decade Complete Form, destroying Ryuga, Orga and Dark Kabuto with the powers of Ryuki Survive, Faiz Blaster Form, and Kabuto Hyper Form, respectively, as Otoya escapes destruction. After the other Natsumi bids farewell to her counterpart and Tsukasa, to whom she gives the K-Touch, the group returns to the Hikari Studio to resume their journey home with their next stop being Daiki Kaito's home world.: This episode is a tribute to various Dark Riders from throughout the Heisei era, continuing the events of Episode 20.
22	"Wanted: Diend"; Transliteration: "Diendo Shimei Tehai" (Japanese: ディエンド指名手配)	Hidenori Ishida	Toshiki Inoue	June 28, 2009
Arriving in Kaito's homeworld, the World of Diend, Tsukasa finds the world in peace and harmony, but with Kaito a wanted man. As Tsukasa assumes the role of a traveling salesman, he meets Kamen Riders Larc and Lance as they battle a Darkroach. After destroying the monster, Tsukasa learns that the world's residents kill Kamen Riders. As Tsukasa and company meet the head of area management committee, Junichi Kaito, Larc and Lance battle the Darkroaches until they receive aid from Diend. Saving them from reinforcements, Tsukasa learns from Haruka and Shin that the world is ruled by the mysterious Fourteen who uses his Roaches to manipulate humans. Cornered by the Bossroach and his Darkroaches, the Kamen Riders battle the Roaches before Lance goes after Diend. While this occurs, Yusuke is kidnapped by the Roaches to be conditioned into being a normal member of the World of Diend's society.: This episode is a tribute to Kamen Rider Blade: Missing Ace.
23	"End of Diend"; Transliteration: "Endo Obu Diendo" (Japanese: エンド・オブ・ディエンド)	Hidenori Ishida	Toshiki Inoue	July 5, 2009
Nearly killed by Lance, Kaito is spared when Larc stops her partner as he reminds her that he is the reason that Junichi is under Fourteen's control. After escaping the angry mob, parting from Haruka and Shin, Kaito and Tsukasa find Natsumi who tells them that Yusuke has been kidnapped by the Roaches before Junichi arrives. After remembering the events leading to his brother's enslavement, Kaito is reluctant to fight as he and Tsukasa transform to follow Junichi, leaving the brain-washed Yusuke behind and taking Natsumi to undergo the process as well. The next day, finding himself a wanted man as well, Tsukasa decides to help Kaito in spite of him refusing his aid at first. Using Kaito as bait to trade for the now brain-washed Natsumi, Tsukasa lures out Fourteen. While Lance and Larc battle Kamen Rider Glaive and the Darkroaches, Diend and Decade battle Fourteen as he reveals his true form as Jashin 14. Though overwhelmed, Decade assumes Complete Form and uses Armed Hibiki's power to destroy him. Though the Roaches fade away and the brainwashed humans return to normal, Glaive attacks Diend and reveals that he willingly served Fourteen. With Decade holding Larc and Lance back, Diend battles Glaive on his own in a heated battle with neither wanting to kill the other. Tsukasa ends the battle, telling the brothers that Daiki now has faith in himself. Junichi leaves and Tsukasa and Kaito go off to the next world, a strange one that Narutaki hopes will overwhelm Decade.: This episode is a tribute to Kamen Rider Blade: Missing Acecontinuing the events of Episode 22.
24	"The Arrival of the Samurai Sentai"; Transliteration: "Kenzan Samurai Sentai" (Japanese: 見参侍戦隊)	Takayuki Shibasaki	Yasuko Kobayashi	July 12, 2009
Arriving in the new world with a strange card in hand, Tsukasa finds himself in the costume of a kuroko before running into Daiki who just stole a squid-like artifact. Daiki mentions that this world is not like the other A.R. Worlds before running off prior to the appearance of mysterious red fish-like monsters. Tsukasa is about to transform before several other Kuroko show up along with five young men and women who transform into the Shinkengers to fight drive them back into the Sanzu River. Yusuke and Natsumi return to the Hikari Studio after losing sight of Tsukasa, with Natsumi worried about not being in an A.R. World. Tsukasa, however, is at the Shiba Clan household, listening in on a discussion between Takeru Shiba and his caretaker, Hikoma Kusakabe, over the latter's need to go to the hospital. Elsewhere, sushiman Genta Umemori catches up to Daiki, ready to fight him for stealing the Ika Origami. Both transform, and Diend summons both Kamen Riders Scissors and Raia to fight Shinken Gold. Unbeknownst to them, Shitari of the Bones sends the Ayakashi Chinomanako to investigate Diend out of dread of his appearance. Chinomanako arrives just as Shinken Gold takes out the summoned riders and steals the DienDriver from Daiki, knocking out Shinken Gold in the process. Chased by the Ayakashi, Daiki makes his way to Tsukasa who laugh at the irony before using Den-O's power as Decade to fight Chinomanako. The Ayakashi escapes at the last minute, and is suddenly compelled to use the DienDriver, inserting the Diend Kamen Ride Card and shooting it above him. Transformed into a monstrous version of Kamen Rider Diend, Chinomanako summons a mass of Nanashi to attack the mortal realm to Narutaki's horror of the newly born abomination.: The second part of Kamen Rider Decade: World of Shinkenger, a crossover special with Samurai Sentai Shinkenger.
25	"Heretic Rider, Go Forth!"; Transliteration: "Gedō Raidā, Mairu!" (Japanese: 外道ライダー、参る！)	Takayuki Shibasaki	Yasuko Kobayashi	July 19, 2009
After Tsukasa reveals himself, Takeru realizes that Tsukasa is the "Decade" Narutaki warned him about. Before the two can fight, Narutaki arrives to tell Tsukasa he is to blame for the terror brought unto the world by the Ayakashi Chinomanako who now has the powers of Diend, and that the only way to save the worlds he entered if he ceases to exist. After Takeru takes out the Nanashi and drives off Chinomanako as Shinken Red, Genta attacks Tsukasa believing that he is in league with Daiki until Natsumi takes him to the Hikari Studio, where Hikoma Kusakabe is hiding. When the other Shinkengers arrive, Daiki uses their fears to cause a fight to break out and escapes with Genta not far behind, leaving Natsumi to break it up before going to a room where all of Tsukasa's photos are kept. When Chinomanako attacks again, Genta ends his chase and contacts the Shinkengers who go off to fight the Ayakashi Rakider alone. Tsukasa, troubled by Narutaki's words, stays behind with Yusuke trying to convince him to help before he goes off on his own. By then, Hikoma comes forward and convinces Tsukasa to continue to find his place, regardless of what Narutaki has said to him. Tsukasa joins the battle just as Chinomanako and his summoned Eagle Undead and Moose Fangire have overpowered the Shinkengers and Kuuga. Decade and Shinken Red fight Chinomanako, who has summoned Kamen Rider Blade to fight with him. The other Shinkengers and Kuuga manage to destroy the Eagle Undead and Moose Fangire as Decade becomes Complete Form and uses the powers of Blade King Form to attack Chinomanako. Using the Blade Final Form Ride Card, he transforms Chinomanako's Blade into the Blade Blade before switching weapons with Shinken Red to use active Rekka Daizantou Attack Ride Card to destroy Chinomanako, saving the world. Daiki shows up just in time to snatch the DienDriver back, only to be thwarted by Shinken Gold who forces him to give back the Ika Origami in exchange for the DienDriver, and then everyone goes their separate ways. As Tsukasa and Yusuke are welcomed home by Eijiro and Natsumi, assuring Tsukasa that the photo studio is his home no matter what, they enter a new A.R. World.: The final part of Kamen Rider Decade: World of Shinkenger, a crossover special with Samurai Sentai Shinkenger.
26	"RX! Dai-Shocker Attack"; Transliteration: "Āru Ekkusu! Dai Shokkā Raishū" (Japanese: RX！大ショッカー来襲)	Osamu Kaneda	Shōji Yonemura	July 26, 2009
Tsukasa finds himself wearing strange clothes with another strange card as he, Natsumi, and Yusuke find themselves attacked by the Strange Demon Robot Schwarian and his Chaps as Kamen Rider Black RX battles them, with both sides believing Tsukasa to be Joe the Haze. When the Seamoon Fangire and Scorpion Imagin suddenly appear, Tsukasa becomes Decade to help RX out against the monsters with Agito's power as Schwarian runs off. After Natsumi stops RX from attacking Decade, RX takes her words to heart and sees Tsukasa as an ally. From there, he introduces himself as Kotaro Minami and says that has been fighting the Crisis Empire. Everyone is confused at the sudden appearance of Imagin and Fangires in this A.R. World with Tsukasa reluctant to fight, once more. While Tsukasa takes pictures, after Natsumi offers him to embrace her world as his home, they confront a man named Guy who is behind the attacks. Introducing himself as Dai-Shocker's Apollo Geist, he knocks the DecaDriver out of Tsukasa's hand as Natsumi takes an attack meant for him as the villain and his attendants leave. Natsumi is hospitalized beyond medical aid and Tsukasa is upset by Narutaki telling him that he is a danger to himself and those around him. Daiki visits Tsukasa and Natsumi, telling Tsukasa about Apollo Geist being from the World of X-Rider and possessing the Perfecter, which is the key to returning Natsumi to normal. Tsukasa goes off to confront Apollo Geist on his own, not wanting anyone else to get hurt, finding Schwarian as Apollo Geist attacks him for refusing to deleiver his offer to Grand Lord Crisis to join Dai-Shocker. With RX's support, Decade battles Apollo Geist before Diend interferes with his own Riders to steal the Perfecter. When Apollo Geist summons the Rhino Mutant, he convinces Schwarian to accept his offer of joining his group as Decade assumes Complete Form to use Kabuto Hyper Form's power to take out the summoned Riders. Apollo Geist escapes into another dimension with Decade in pursuit as RX holds off the monsters. Arriving at the other end, Decade finds Kotaro Minami who transforms into Kamen Rider Black to attack him.: This episode is a tribute to Kamen Rider Black and Kamen Rider Black RX.
27	"Black × Black RX" (Japanese: BLACK×BLACK RX)	Osamu Kaneda	Shōji Yonemura	August 2, 2009
Following Apollo Geist into another A.R. World, Decade is attacked by Kamen Rider Black until Diend arrives and summons Femme to hold him off. The next day, after learning that he is in the World of Black and seeing that he is on his own in saving Natsumi, Decade ambushes Guy as Ryuki and fights him until he uses a little girl as his hostage. When Decade takes a hit from Diend to save the child, Black watches and has second thoughts about him as Apollo Geist escapes. After explaining that Apollo Geist came to the world before and recruited the cult Gorgom into Dai-Shocker, Kotaro reveals that Joe the Haze ended up in his world and has been helping him fend off Dai-Shocker's endless army. Schwarian arrives and sends the Scorpion Imagin and Mantis Fangire after Decade and Black. Using Faiz's power, Decade destroys the two monsters as Schwarian summons the Chaps, allowing Tsukasa to make it back to World of Black RX as Apollo Geist summons a pack of Orphnoch and Worms. The numbers even out as Daiki arrives and use Decade's card to summon the World of Black's Kotaro. With Black and Black RX fighting with them, Decade and Diend battle the monsters as Decade assumes Complete Form and uses Agito Shining Form's power to destroy Schwarian. After getting the Perfecter from Apollo Geist, Diend steals it as Yusuke arrives to tell Tsukasa that Natsumi is about to die. Once there, Daiki shows up to give the Perfecter to Tsukasa, who uses a bit of his life force to revive Natsumi and bring her back to life. Black and Black RX continue their battle Apollo Geist until he is escapes into another A.R. World with Narutaki comments that Decade is to blame for Dai-Shocker. After checking up on Kotaro and telling him that Joe is aiding his other self, Tsukasa returns to the Hikari Studio where he and his friends venture into the next world.: This episode is a tribute to Kamen Rider Black and Kamen Rider Black RX, continuing the events of Episode 26.
28	"Amazon, Friend"; Transliteration: "Amazon, Tomodachi" (Japanese: アマゾン、トモダチ)	Takao Nagaishi	Shōji Yonemura	August 9, 2009
Arriving in a new A.R. World, finding himself in a baseball uniform, Tsukasa notices the people are acting strange while saluting each other before he, Natsumi and Yusuke are singled out as rebels against Dai-Shocker with Propheta Cruentis, Go-Jaraji-Da, and Camponotus Worm Maxilla appearing to exterminate them. Amazon arrives to their aid, fighting the monsters with Decade backing him up as the people back up the surviving monsters under a boy named Masahiko. After briefly escaping them, they encounter Daiki who and reveals that Dai-Shocker is controlling this world with the Ten-Faced Demon of Geddon as its ruler. Evading the military police, Tsukasa and company find Masahiko being attacked by Dai-Shocker Soldiers as Amazon and Yusuke come to his aid. Getting Amazon's trust, in spite of Tsukasa's feelings about the boy's sudden change of heart, Masahiko is brought to the Hikari Studio as he contacts Dai-Shocker to their location, with the Ten-Faced Demon Llumu Qhimil appearing with Apollo Geist and monsters. While Decade battles Apollo Geist, Kuuga and Amazon deal with the monsters until Llumu Qhimil joins the fray, overpowering the riders single-handedly. Taking advantage, Apollo Geist attempts to kill Decade, only for Decade to dodge it with Amazon protecting Masahiko from the stray shot as the boy takes the GiGi Armlet from him.: This episode is a tribute to Kamen Rider Amazon.
29	"The Strong, Naked, Strong Guy"; Transliteration: "Tsuyokute Hadaka de Tsuyoi Yatsu" (Japanese: 強くてハダカで強い奴)	Takao Nagaishi	Shōji Yonemura	August 16, 2009
Evading Apollo Geist and Llumu Qhimil with Diend's attempt to get the GaGa Armlet, Tsukasa has his wounds tended to by Natsumi in Dai-Shocker's school before Yusuke and a weakened Amazon join them, revealing that Masahiko took the GiGi Armlet as Ritsuko arrives and calls in the Dai-Shocker Soldiers after them despite Tsukasa questioning her faith in Dai-Shocker. Later after finding the Hikari Photo Studios in ruins, Amazon ponders if he should join them. The gang meets Daiki as he reveals that Masahiko delivered the GiGi Armlet to Llumu Qhimil who awarded the boy to be the first to be subjected to Dai-Shocker's monster conversion plan. After being saved and telling his sister that Dai-Shocker are not the good guys, and learning that Amazon's leaving because of him, Masahiko runs off to get the GiGi Armlet as Decade battles Llumu Qhimil. Regaining the GiGi Armlet, Amazon assumes his Rider form and helps Decade in driving off Apollo Geist as Diend manages to take the GaGa Armlet from Llumu Qhimil. However, Decade Complete Form gets the GaGa Armlet through an Attack Ride Card and knocks Llumu Qhimil down with Faiz Blaster Form's power and Diend before giving the armlet to Amazon to destroy the Ten Faced Demon. As Amazon finally finds a home with Masahiko and Ritsuko, Tsukasa and company get a new member on their team in Daiki as they end up in the A.R. World from Natsumi's dream: the site of the Rider War.: This episode is a tribute to Kamen Rider Amazon, continuing the events of Episode 28, and leading up to the events of Kamen Rider Decade: Protect! The World of Televikun and Kamen Rider Decade: All Riders vs. Dai-Shocker at the same time.
30	"Rider War: Prologue"; Transliteration: "Raidā Taisen Joshō" (Japanese: ライダー大戦・序章)	Hidenori Ishida	Shōji Yonemura	August 23, 2009
When Natsumi realizes that this is the world from her nightmares, she becomes wary for Tsukasa's well-being. Finding him in a tuxedo and feeling that this is the final chapter to their journey, they witness Wataru and Kazuma leading their respective Rider/monster groups against each other. After Rising Ixa and Leangle are killed off in the fight, Tsukasa makes his way to Wataru as he grieves over Ixa's death. Meeting the Fangire Queen Yuki, they learn from Wataru that the Riders are fighting each other to maintain the existence of their worlds. Returning to Hikari Studio after refusing to take sides, Natsumi reveals her dreams as Narutaki appears and reveals it to be the work of Apollo Geist and asks Tsukasa to stop Dai-Shocker. Tsukasa and Yuusuke attempt to set up peace between Wataru and Kazuma so they can stop Dai-Shocker together, but the two are too focused on protecting their worlds to listen. While this occurs, Natsumi finds the young riders of the World of Hibiki being overpowered by Saga and the Fangires until only Hibiki remains. After killing Saga with Daiki's aid, Asumu mourns over his friends as he shows Daiki that there some treasures that should never be taken. Learning that Apollo Geist is to marry Yuki, Tsukasa heads to the wedding to investigate. Coming with Garren to his aid, Blade and Decade destroy the Fangires and the Undead with Diend's help. But Guy assumes his new Super Apollo Geist form and quickens the merging of the Nine Worlds into the World of the Rider War, completely eliminating the World of Blade and causing Blade and Garren to disappear. Elsewhere, another man arrives in this A.R. World, identified by Daiki as Kazuma Kenzaki, who points out Dai-Shocker is not their true enemy.: This episode takes place after the events of Kamen Rider Decade: Protect! The World of Televikun and Kamen Rider Decade: All Riders vs. Dai-Shocker at the same time.
31 (Finale)	"The Destroyer of Worlds"; Transliteration: "Sekai no Hakaisha" (Japanese: 世界の破壊者)	Hidenori Ishida	Shōji Yonemura	August 30, 2009
After fighting off the Riders, Super Apollo Geist takes Natsumi to be his new bride as he flees. Kazuma Kenzaki appears, saying that Tsukasa's existence is the real cause of the worlds blending before confronting him as Kamen Rider Blade in King Form in order to force him to leave the world at once with Asumu keeping Yusuke and Wataru from interfering as Decade is easily defeated. After returning to the Hikari Studio, Tsukasa is recuperating while learning that all of his photos are starting to vanish as a result of the worlds' fusion; Eijiro gives him hope with a photo of Natsumi and tells him not to give up. Following Kiva-la, Tsukasa is attacked by Wataru and Asumu, whom Kenzaki recruited so they can save their worlds, after he refuses to leave. Kuuga gets Tsukasa to run off so he can save Natsumi while he holds Kiva and Hibiki off, though briefly torn by his loyalities. Meanwhile, Super Apollo Geist resurrects the Beetle Fangire, Paradoxa Undead, Tiger Orphnoch, Taurus Ballista, Alligator Imagin, and the Phylloxera Worm. The next day, Tsukasa finds Super Apollo Geist's base as he meets Daiki who warns about the trap arranged for him. After promising the world to Daiki if he dies, Tsukasa arrives to stop Guy as he is about to consume Natsumi's life energy, fighting both Super Apollo Geist and the monsters with aid from Kuuga and Diend. With Kiva and Hibiki joining the fight, the Riders take out the monsters. After Yusuke gets injured protecting him, Decade uses Diend's Final Attack Ride card to kill Super Apollo Geist. With the battle over, Natsumi soon recognizes that she is in the exact place where her dream takes place as Kiva and Hibiki fade away with the Nine Worlds destroyed, with only Yusuke surviving. Tsukasa is suddenly transported to the dimension where he had spoken with Wataru Kurenai then explains Tsukasa that his true goal is to defeat all of the Heisei Kamen Riders. Tsukasa finds himself back in the World of the Rider War, confronted by the eight of the nine other Heisei Kamen Riders. Kiva-la then bites Yusuke, turning him into a black-eyed Kamen Rider Kuuga Ultimate Form. With Narutaki overseeing it, the Rider War commences with Diend suddenly firing the DienDriver at an very concerned Decade at point blank range. In Special Version, Natsumi knows Decade was the Destroyer of Worlds after Wataru told Tsukasa.: This episode leads to the events of Decade: The Last Story as the series' epilogue.
