= List of Kamen Rider Black characters =

This is a character list for the eighth and ninth Kamen Rider series Kamen Rider Black (仮面ライダーBLACK(ブラック), Kamen Raidā Burakku) and Kamen Rider Black RX (仮面ライダーBLACK RX(ブラック アールエックス), Kamen Raidā Burakku Āru Ekkusu), respectively. This character list also includes characters seen in the series reboot/reimagining Kamen Rider Black Sun (仮面ライダーBLACK SUN, Kamen Raidā Burakku San).

The hero of the series is Kotaro Minami, the alter ego of Kamen Rider Black. He later rises from a fiery explosion as Kamen Rider Black RX. The RX series also sees the return of the antagonist Shadow Moon.

== Main characters ==
=== Kotaro Minami ===
Kotaro Minami (南 光太郎, Minami Kōtarō) is a 19-year-old man who became a mutant cyborg called the Batta Mutant (バッタ怪人, Batta Kaijin) after the Gorgom captured him and his best friend, Nobuhiko. Both are kidnapped for the sake of turning them into the Century Kings by having them compete for the right of succeeding the Creation King and command Gorgom to rule the world, but just as his memories were about to be erased, Kotaro manages to escape. Since then, using the power ot the King Stone of the Sun in his transformation belt, he transforms into the Century King Black Sun (ブラックサン, Burakku San), who re-dubbed himself as Kamen Rider Black, to stop Gorgom and attempt to rescue Nobuhiko from them.

As Kamen Rider Black, Kotaro specializes in hand-to-hand combat to finish his enemies, although he once wields Shadow Moon's weapon, the Satan Saber, for his final battle against the Creation King. He also uses two motorcycles during the series, which are as follows:

- Battle Hopper (バトルホッパー, Batoru Hoppā): A living motorcycle created by Gorgom, made specifically for the next Creation King. Used by Black during the series, it is temporarily hijacked by Shadow Moon once he is chosen by the Creation King as his true successor, but is destroyed by him once it manages to break free of his control and rejoin Black's side. It is later revived as Acrobatter when Kotaro evolves into Black RX.
- Road Sector (ロードセクター, Rōdo Sekutā): Black's secondary motorcycle originally created by Yoichi Daimon for Gorgom before he defects from the organization. Yoichi's son Akira Daimon lends it to Kotaro until the end of his fight against Gorgom.

During the events of Black RX, Kotaro lives with the Sahara Family and is captured by the Crisis Empire who ask him to join their side. When Kotaro refuses, they shatter his King Stone into two pieces, thus rendering him unable to transform into Kamen Rider Black. They throw him into outer space, where the sun's radiation mutated his King Stone, allowing him to evolve into the "Child of the Sun" (太陽の子, Taiyō no Ko), Kamen Rider Black RX, to fight the Crisis Empire and the Kaima Soldiers.

As Kamen Rider Black RX, Kotaro wields the Revolcane (リボルケイン, Riborukein) rapier, which allows him to perform the Revol Crash (リボルクラッシュ, Riboru Kurasshu) finisher. During the series, he gains access to two additional forms, which are as follows:

- Robo Rider (ロボライダー, Robo Raidā): An auxiliary form, also known as the "Prince of Sadness" (悲しみの王子, Kanashimi no Ōji), that grants superhuman strength. In this form, Kotaro wields the Vortech Shooter (ボルティックシューター, Borutikku Shūtā) handgun, which allows him to perform the Hard Shot (ハードショット, Hādo Shotto) finisher.
- Bio Rider (バイオライダー, Baio Raidā): An auxiliary form, also known as the "Prince of Anger" (怒りの王子, Ikari no Ōji), that grants self-liquefaction capabilities. In this form, Kotaro wields the Bio Blade (バイオブレード, Baio Burēdo) sword, which allows him to perform the Spark Cutter (スパークカッター, Spāku Kattā) finisher.

Like his previous form, Black RX has two different vehicles at his disposal, which are as follows:

- Acrobatter (アクロバッター, Akurobattā): Battle Hopper's upgraded form, created once Kotaro evolves from Black to Black RX which subsequently triggers its resurrection. Unlike its previous form, it is capable of speaking with its owner. Like Black RX, it can assume two different forms: Roboizer (ロボイザー, Roboizā), driven by Robo Rider, and Mach Jabber (マックジャバー, Makku Jabā), driven by Bio Rider.
- Ridoron (ライドロン, Raidoron): A car created by Kotaro using some blueprints given to him by Prof. Wald, a scientist in one of the colonies the Crisis Empire set up. It's also the first car used as a vehicle by a Kamen Rider and was the sole exception until Kamen Rider Drive 25 years later.

In the series reboot Kamen Rider Black Sun, Kotaro is a former member of the Gorgom movement that originally advocated for peaceful coexistence between humans and Kaijin. Born in 1952 on the day of a solar eclipse, he and Nobuhiko Akizuki are the sons of scientists who were studying the Creation King. As children, they were chosen to be the Creation King's successors and were implanted with the Kingstones, which transformed them into Migratory Locust Kaijin. Kotaro, alongside Nobuhiko, Yukari Shinjo, and Bilgenia, eventually defects from Gorgom, kidnapping the Creation King and Shinichi Donami in the process as a means to gain leverage. His time with the splinter group changes his views on the future of Kaijin, agreeing that killing the Creation King and ending Kaijin-kind altogether is the only path to peace. After attempting to kill the Creation King and being grievously wounded in the process, Kotaro goes into hiding for 50 years, becoming a freelance "debt collector" to fund his ketamine addiction. Because he has not consumed Heat Heaven in the intervening years, he has visibly aged, looking like a middle-aged man despite being chronologically in his 70s by 2022. Utilizing the Century King Sun Driver (世紀王サンドライバー, Seiki Ō San Doraibā) belt, Kotaro is initially able to transform into the Black Locust Kaijin, but his rage at Aoi Izumi being transformed into a Kaijin allows him to evolve into the Century King Kamen Rider Black Sun (仮仮面ライダーBLACK(ブラック) SUN(サン), Kamen Raidā Burakku San). In his transformed state, Kotaro is able to forcefully remove the two leglike appendages on his torso to use as makeshift weapons known as the Century King Black Blade (世紀王ブラックブレード, Seiki Ō Burakku Burēdo). However, these appendages do not regrow after being removed. After defeating Nobuhiko and killing the original Creation King, he is forcibly assimilated by the Creation King's still-living heart, which also merges his body with Nobuhiko's remains. This mutates his Kaijin form into a new Creation King and suppresses his will, forcing Aoi to cut him down with the broken Satansaber.

Kotaro Minami is portrayed by Tetsuo Kurata (倉田 てつを, Kurata Tetsuo). The Kamen Rider Black Sun incarnation of the character is portrayed by Hidetoshi Nishijima (西島 秀俊, Nishijima Hidetoshi).

=== Nobuhiko Akizuki ===
Nobuhiko Akizuki (秋月 信彦, Akizuki Nobuhiko) was born on the day of a solar eclipse alongside his best friend, Kotaro Minami, revered by the Gorgom as the heirs to their leader's throne: the Century Kings "Shadow Moon" and "Black Sun". Raised together, the two were like brothers. Once the two were of the ideal age, Gorgom captured them and infused them each with a King Stone. While Kotaro manages to escape with his memory intact, Nobuhiko was turned completely into a Batta Mutant with his mind wiped clean while left in a comatose state on life support due to the injuries he sustained during Kotaro's escape before being finally reborn as Shadow Moon (シャドームーン, Shadō Mūn) through the Stones of Earth, Heaven, and Sea. Shadow Moon sets up his regime as a general of Gorgom, serving as Black's nemesis and forcing him to fight him so he can become the new Creation King. In their final battle, Shadow Moon is weakened by Kamen Rider Black after the Satan Saber is used to slash his King Stone. Though he appears to die after being left inside the Gorgom headquarters when it explodes, Shadow Moon returns years later to seek revenge against Kotaro, who is now Black RX. However, he lost all of his memories related to Gorgom after its destruction. He is finally defeated by Black RX when he thrust the Revolcane through Shadow Moon's King Stone, destroying it once more. He turns back into Nobuhiko, renouncing his evil ways as he saved two children trapped in the explosive lava, shortly before he dies.

Due to the critical injuries he sustained during Kotaro's escape, Nobuhiko was further upgraded with cybernetics during his hibernation period under Gorgom's clutches before he fully awakens as Shadow Moon. As such, his overall strength increases compared to his counterpart:

- The Shadow Charger (シャドーチャージャー, Shadō Chājā) is Shadow Moon's belt-like cell nucleus reactor. Embedded upon the center of his belt is a green King Stone called the Stone of the Moon (月の石, Tsuki no Seki). Through this stone, Shadow Moon can telepathically communicate with Kotaro via his own King Stone.
- The Satan Saber (サタンサーベル, Satan Sāberu) is a weapon created for use by the Century Kings. Though Bilgenia took it, Shadow Moon reclaimed the weapon and took it as his own. He lost it to Black during their final battle before the weapon was slowly evaporated upon Gorgom's destruction.
- The Shadow Sabers (シャドーセイバー, Shadō Seibā) are a pair of long and short swords manifested by the King Stone. These weapons were used as a replacement for the Satan Saber.

In the series reboot, Kamen Rider Black Sun, Nobuhiko was born in 1952 on the day of a solar eclipse. Kotaro and Nobuhiko's fathers were scientists studying the Creation King and chose them to succeed the Creation King, implanting the boys with the Kingstones and transforming them into Migratory Locust Kaijin, with Nobuhiko becoming the Silver Locust Kaijin. During the 70s, falling in love with a human named Yukari Shinjou who sought equality between their peoples, Nobuhiko aided Yukari's splinter faction of Gorgom in the kidnapping of Shinichi Donami before it fell apart and was incarcerated in complex where he is interrogated on the whereabouts of the Kingstones while being force-fed Heaven made from Yukari's remains. In the present, Nobuhiko escapes and plots his revenge on the Gorgom party before Shinichi reveals that Yukari was a government agent his grandfather assigned to acquire the Kingstones. The revelation drives Nobuhiko over the edge and he fully awakens as the Century King Kamen Rider Shadowmoon (仮面ライダーSHADOWMOON(シャドームーン), Kamen Raidā Shadōmūn), changing his plans to convert the Gorgom Party into a supremacist group under his leadership with aspirations of creating an utopia for Kaijin as the new Creation King. Nobuhiko transforms into both his Kaijin and Kamen Rider forms using the Century King Moon Driver (世紀王ムーンドライバー, Seiki Ō Mūn Doraibā) belt. In his transformed state, Nobuhiko is able to forcefully remove the two leg-like appendages on his torso to use as makeshift weapons known as the Century King Shadow Blade (世紀王シャドーブレード, Seiki Ō Shadō Burēdo). However, these appendages do not regrow after being removed.

Nobuhiko Akizuki is portrayed by Takahito Horiuchi (堀内 孝人, Horiuchi Takahito) in the original series with his Shadow Moon form voiced in most of his appearances by Masaki Terasoma, including the 3D short film Kamen Rider World as the main antagonist and the 40th anniversary film OOO, Den-O, All Riders: Let's Go Kamen Riders as a member of Shocker. Shadow Moon also appears in crossover films Kamen Rider × Super Sentai: Super Hero Taisen as a member of Dai Shocker and Kamen Rider × Super Sentai × Space Sheriff: Super Hero Taisen Z as a leading figure in Space Shocker. The Kamen Rider Black Sun incarnation of Nobuhiko is portrayed by Tomoya Nakamura (中村 倫也, Nakamura Tomoya).

== Black characters ==
=== Kyoko Akizuki ===
Kyoko Akizuki (秋月 杏子, Akizuki Kyōko) is Nobuhiko's younger sister and is eventually Kotaro's stepsister, targeted a number of times by the High Priests as her life force could awaken Shadow Moon. At first she was not aware of Kotaro being Black himself until his fight to save her from the clutches of Bilgenia. Once Nobuhiko emerges as Shadow Moon, she and Katsumi are terrified of his new appearance as she eagerly refuses his offer to join him in making a new world without violence. After the defeat of Black at the hands of Shadow Moon, she and Katsumi left Japan to start a new life abroad. However, when Katsumi heard the news about Black's revival, Kyoko attempts to return to Japan to see Kotaro again.

Kyoko Akizuki is portrayed by Akemi Inoue (井上 明美, Inoue Akemi).

=== Katsumi Kida ===
Katsumi Kida (紀田 克美, Kida Katsumi) is Nobuhiko's girlfriend, like Kyoko she is not aware of Kotaro being Black himself until Kyoko tells her the truth about Kotaro. Once Nobuhiko emerges as Shadow Moon, she was also terrified of his new appearance. After the defeat of Black at the hands of Shadow Moon, she and Kyoko left Japan to start a new life abroad.

Katsumi Kida is portrayed by Ayumi Taguchi (田口 あゆみ, Taguchi Ayumi).

=== Soichiro Akizuki ===
Soichiro Akizuki (秋月 総一郎, Akizuki Sōichirō) is an archaeologist and friend of Kotaro's father. Soichiro joined Gorgom to financially support his archaeological projects. He is the father of Nobuhiko and Kyoko and soon became the stepfather to Kotaro when he learned his parents were killed by Gorgom through an accident since he was three years old. He was assassinated by Golgom's mutant, Spider Mutant for disobeying their orders, for all he realized that they were an organization of evil.

Soichiro Akizuki is portrayed by Kantaro Suga.

=== Masaru Todo ===
Masaru Todo (東堂 勝, Tōdō Masaru) is Kotaro's senior at the university who owns the Capitola bar shop where Kyoko and Katsumi work part-time.

Masaru Todo is portrayed by Sent (セント, Sento).

=== Yoko ===
Yoko is a Kotaro's Close Friend & Katsumi Kida's Friend. She is Good at Maths Exam in High School.

=== Ryusuke Taki ===
Ryusuke Taki (滝 竜介, Taki Ryūsuke) is a Special Agent from America who helped Kotaro in bad situations. He had been Nobuhiko's senior in soccer and taught him a technique called the Dragon Shot. Kotaro would learn this technique later on as well and use it as Black. He is aware of Kotaro's identity as Black.

Masaki Kyomoto (京本 政樹, Kyōmoto Masaki) guest stars as Ryusuke Taki in episodes 16 & 30.

=== Kujira Mutant ===
Kujira Mutant (クジラ怪人, Kujira Kaijin; 46 & 48-50) is a sperm whale Mutant able to emit sticky foam from his blowhole and use a sonic attack. Unlike the others members of Gorgom, the Kujira Mutant was concerned for the oceans after overhearing Baraom and Darom talking about Gorgom's rise to power and that they might pollute the oceans, so he rebelled as a result. Recruited by Baraom to defeat Black, the Kujira Mutant overpowered Black when Baraom arrived to take his King Stone. But learning the Mutant's intent, Baraom attempted to kill the Mutant along with Black. As a result, the Kujira Mutant became an ally of Kamen Rider Black before retreating into the sea. Upon learning of Black's defeat, the Kujira Mutant searched the ocean and found his body, using a revival ceremony of his clan within his cave home to bring him back to life. Darom and the Komori Mutant then went after the Kujira Mutant until Kotaro revived and came to his aid. However, the Kujira Mutant was forced to turn himself in to Gorgom to save a child's life. Darom used him as bait for Black, only for the Kujira Mutant to help Black defeat Darom. Though still wounded from the Kōmori Mutant's attack, the Kujira Mutant guides Black to the cave that is Gorgom's Shrine before being attacked by the Togeuo Mutant. Kotaro catches up as the Togeuo Mutant starts to overwhelm Kujira Mutant but is forced to the Creation King's palace with the Kujira Mutant telling Black to protect the oceans before he died. The Kujira Mutant's cave would later serve to give life to Rideron before it caved in as a result.

Kujira Mutant is voiced by Eisuke Yoda (依田英助, Yoda Eisuke).

== RX characters ==
=== Reiko Shiratori ===
Reiko Shiratori (白鳥 玲子, Shiratori Reiko) is Kotaro's girlfriend who is a photographer, helping him before and after learning he is Black RX. After learning that Kotaro is Black RX, she begins to train herself in order fight Crisis' minions.

Reiko Shiratori is portrayed by Makoto Sumikawa (澄川 真琴, Sumikawa Makoto), or Jun Koyamaki, who previously portrayed Diana Lady in Jikuu Senshi Spielban alongside fellow JAC actor Hiroshi Watari, who portrayed Yousuke Jou/Spielban.

=== Sahara Family ===
The Sahara Family (佐原家, Sahara-ke) are the ones who took in Kotaro and gave him a job in their helicopter business Sahara Airlines. Shunkichi (俊吉) and Utako (唄子) are the parents who are always arguing with each other, Shigeru (茂) is their son, and Hitomi (ひとみ) is their daughter. The parents are murdered by Jark Midla in episode 46. Shigeru is the first person in the series to know that Kotaro is Black RX.

Makoto Akatsuka (赤塚 真人, Akatsuka Makoto), Eri Tsuruma (鶴間 エリ, Tsuruma Eri), Go Inoue (井上 豪, Inoue Gō), and Shouko Imura (井村 翔子, Imura Shōko) portray Shunkichi, Utako, Shigeru, and Hitomi respectively.

=== Joe the Haze ===
Joe the Haze (霞のジョー, Kasumi no Jō; 15-18, 20-26 & 37-47) is a master of the fighting style Haze Kenpo (霞拳法, Kasumi Kenpō). He is one of Kotaro's closest friends and considered just as close as he was to Nobuhiko. Joe was originally a human from Earth who willingly allowed the Crisis Empire to convert him into a cyborg, losing all memory of his past and actual name. Under the control of Necksticker, Joe attacked Kotaro during his attempt to save Hitomi, becoming his ally once he regained his mind. He ended up injured by Bosgan during RX's fight with Gynagingam. He soon recovered and came back to help Kotaro.

Joe the Haze is portrayed by Rikiya Koyama (小山 力也, Koyama Rikiya).

=== Kyoko Matoba ===
Kyoko Matoba (的場 響子, Matoba Kyōko; 29, 30, 38-41 & 43-47) is an ESP girl who is skilled with a bow and can manipulate ground water. Her parents were murdered by the Crisis Empire monster Mundayganday, helping RX fight the Crisis Empire. Before specifically manipulating water, she was able to control all sorts of things in nature such as plants and rocks.

Kyoko Matoba is portrayed by Megumi Ueno (上野 めぐみ, Ueno Megumi).

=== Goro ===
Goro (吾郎, Gorō; 6, 14, 20, 26, 35, 37, 40 & 45-47) is a chef who works at Sahara Airlines.

Goro is portrayed by Jo Onodera (小野寺 丈, Onodera Jō), the son of Kamen Rider Series creator Shotaro Ishinomori.

=== Hayato Hayamizu ===
Hayato Hayamizu (速水 隼人, Hayamizu Hayato; 2, 6, 7 & 12) is an inspector who pursues Kotaro, believing he's a troublemaker. He was last seen knocked unconscious by Maribaron when she uses him to arrest Kotaro for her.

Hayato Hayamizu is portrayed by Minoru Sawatari (佐渡 稔, Sawatari Minoru).

=== Ten Veteran Kamen Riders ===
The original Ten Veteran Kamen Riders are composed of Kamen Riders 1 to ZX. They help Black RX in defeating the Crisis Empire. They appear at their base in the Arizona Desert in episodes 41-43 and help RX in episodes 44-47.

The appearance of the previous 10 Kamen Riders in the last 7 episodes of the series was their last in the franchise history, up until Kamen Rider Decade: All Riders vs. Dai-Shocker, not counting the remake versions of Kamen Riders 1, 2, and V3 in recent movies Kamen Rider: The First and Kamen Rider: The Next.

== Black Sun characters ==
=== Aoi Izumi ===
Aoi Izumi (和泉 葵, Izumi Aoi) is a teenage Kaijin rights activist. At a young age, her birth parents abandoned her to the care of Misaki Izumi, a family friend, and gave her a necklace with a red gemstone. At some point during her childhood, she befriended Shunsuke Komatsu, a Sparrow Kaijin, which inspired her to become an advocate for coexistence between humans and Kaijin. After giving an anti-discrimination speech at the United Nations that brings her international attention, Gorgom realizes the necklace her birth parents gave her is actually the red Kingstone and targets her. Kotaro finds her being attacked by the Spider Kaijin and protects her, reluctantly taking her under his wing and teaching her some martial arts and self-defense skills. She experiences many personal tragedies, including the deaths of her adoptive mother, birth parents, and Shunsuke over the course of the conflict with Gorgom and increasing tension between humans and Kaijin. These experiences make her jaded and more willing to use violence and force to fight back against those who would harm Kaijin.

After falling into a trap set by Bilgenia, Aoi is forcibly transformed into a Mantis Kaijin (蟷螂(カマキリ)怪人, Kamakiri Kaijin). She is initially horrified by her transformation, but learns to accept and control it. Her Kaijin form eventually matures to the point that she manifests her own Driver, which signifies that she has the potential to become a Creation King. As the Mantis Kaijin, Aoi possesses superhuman speed and agility as well as razor-sharp blades resembling mantis forelegs on her wrists.

Aoi Izumi is portrayed by Kokoro Hirasawa (平澤 宏々路, Hirasawa Kokoro)

=== Shunsuke Komatsu ===
Shunsuke Komatsu (小松 俊介, Komatsu Shunsuke) is a Sparrow Kaijin (スズメ怪人, Suzume Kaijin) and Aoi's childhood friend. Aoi often had to defend him from anti-Kaijin harassment as they were growing up because of his gentle and non-confrontational nature. Inspired by Nobuhiko Akizuki, he joins Nobuhiko's resistance group and learns how to fight, becoming addicted to Heat Heaven in the process. Emboldened, Shunsuke eventually confronts Wataru Igaki's anti-Kaijin extremists, which leads to him being lynched. Shunsuke's death is ultimately what drives Nobuhiko over the edge, causing his evolution into Kamen Rider Shadowmoon and fueling a new desire to have Kaijin subjugate humanity.

Shunsuke Komatsu is portrayed by Genki Kimura (木村 舷碁, Kimura Genki)

=== Nick ===
Nick (ニック, Nikku) is a close friend of Aoi's, a Black youth who acts as an informant regarding government and Gorgom activities. He envies Kaijin and wishes to become one himself despite the discrimination they face. He betrays Aoi by leading her into a trap set by Bilgenia in exchange for being transformed into a Kaijin, but regrets his actions after Bilgenia goes back on his word. Aoi later forgives him after he assists Kotaro's group. It is eventually revealed that Oliver Johnson was his father and he holds Shinichi Donami in deep contempt for his hand in Oliver's death. Nick is later voluntarily transformed into a Cricket Kaijin (コオリギ怪人, Koorogi Kaijin), using his new powers to kill Donami and avenge his father.

Nick is portrayed by Jua.

=== Oliver Johnson ===
Oliver Johnson (オリバー・ジョンソン, Oribā Jonson) is a human founding member of the Gorgom Party. Though not a Kaijin, he strongly relates with their cause as a Black man, having faced discrimination himself. He took and hid the Kingstones for many years, becoming the leader of a church and fathering Nick. He is killed when Shinichi Donami tracks him down to find the Kingstones.

Oliver Johnson is portrayed by Moctar.

=== Yukari Shinjo ===
Yukari Shinjo (新城 ゆかり, Shinjō Yukari) is a leading member of the Gorgom Party. After Kotaro and Nobuhiko join, Nobuhiko develops feelings for her despite her being a normal human. Multiple failed attempts to get government recognition lead to Yukari proposing a plan to kidnap Shinichi Donami to give Gorgom leverage. After doing so, she, Bilgenia, Kotaro, and Nobuhiko form a splinter faction, hiding in the jungle with the Creation King. She reveals to Nobuhiko that she actually intends to kill the Creation King to ensure that no more Kaijin could be born, reasoning that it would be the only way for current Kaijin to live in peace as Gorgom would not be around forever to protect them. Kotaro and Nobuhiko are convinced by this reasoning and give the Kingstones to her for safekeeping, but the plan ultimately fails when Shinichi reports their location, leading to her death and Nobuhiko's imprisonment. Nobuhiko is later force fed her remains, which had been turned into a batch of Heat Heaven. Shinichi later claims to Nobuhiko that Yukari was actually a government spy sent to retrieve the Kingstones, though it is never confirmed if this claim was true.

Yukari Shinjo is portrayed by Haruka Imou (芋生 悠, Imō Haruka).

== Antagonists ==
=== Gorgom ===
The main villains from Kamen Rider Black, Dark Society Gorgom (暗黒結社ゴルゴム, Ankoku Kessha Gorugomu) is a criminal cult group primarily based in Japan. Members of Gorgom consist of both human and non-humans. The group is notorious for its terrorist activities in the name of world domination. For every 50,000 years, Gorgom chooses two men who were born on a solar eclipse to be converted into their cyborg Century Kings (世紀王, Seiki Ō) and pitted them in a battle to the death, with the winner claims the defeated Century King's King Stone and become the succeeding Creation King.

In the series reboot, Kamen Rider Black Sun, the Gorgom Party (ゴルゴム党, Gorugomu-tō) was originally a minority movement during the 70s that sought for their fellow Kaijins to have the right to exist, before ending up a shadowy influential institution in bed with corrupt government officials while seeking the continued existence of the Kaijins.

==== Creation King ====
The Creation King (創世王, Sōsei Ō; 50 & 51) is the almost omnipotent leader of Gorgom. He appears as a giant evil heart that communicates with the High Priests and the two Century Kings via telepathy. The Creation King also had monstrous strength that could destroy the entire universe. The Creation King pulled Kamen Rider Black away from where the Stickleback Mutant was attacking Whale Mutant. He made itself known to Kamen Rider Black and Shadow Moon. The Creation King then transported Black and Shadow Moon to the battle field to determine who will become his successor. After Shadow Moon was ultimately defeated, Black confronted the Creation King who threatened him to take the Kingstone from Shadow Moon's body unless he wants the Creation King to jump into the hole he created to lead him to the Earth's core and destroy it from within. The Creation King was killed by Black when the Satan Saber was stabbed into him.

In the series reboot, Kamen Rider Black Sun, the Creation King was originally a giant grasshopper Kaijin that was a product of Imperial Japan's superhuman experiments to create living weapons for military application. The Creation King's bodily fluids are used to both prolong Kaijin lives while converting humans into Kaijins, resulting in him being revered as a living deity. At the start of the series, the Creation King was dying before Kotaro rips out his heart in an attempt to kill the monster. However, the Creation King's heart survives before turning Kotaro into its host prior to being killed for good by Aoi Izumi.

The Creation King is voiced in the original series by Takeshi Watabe (渡部 猛, Watabe Takeshi).

==== High Priests ====
The Three High Priests (三大神官, San Daishinkan) are second only to the Creation King, and they carry out his will. Upon their sacrificing their Stones to revive Shadow Moon, the dying High Priests undergo a transformation into new physical forms called the Grand Mutants (大怪人, Daikaijin), reborn as Shadow Moon's emissaries. Setting up for his final battle with Kotaro, Shadow Moon sends the Grand Mutants to attack the city, overpowering the police as everyone runs out of Tokyo. Kotaro arrives to fight them all before they fallback, telling Kotaro he cannot stop the rise of Gorgom. Eventually, the three are killed off one by one.

In the series reboot, Kamen Rider Black Sun, the High Priests are leading members of the Gorgom Party who were forced to associate themselves with corrupt government officials for the sake of their race. But the group ceases to be with Darom and Baraom killed while Bishium survived and formed an alliance with the new prime minister Isao Nimura.

===== Darom =====
High Priest Darom (大神官ダロム, Daishinkan Daromu; 1-36) is the leader of the High Priests, having a pale ancient face and able to manipulate others by pointing at them. After sacrificing his "Stone of Heaven" to revive Shadow Moon, Darom is reborn as Grand Mutant Darom (大怪人ダロム, Daikaijin Daromu; 36-49), a trilobite-like creature. In this form, he can discharge laser beams from his fingers and use his feelers like ropes. Following Baraom and Bishium's death, Darom attacked the ex-Shonen Warriors until Kotaro arrives and fights Darom until Shadow Moon arrives, killing Black and sending Darom to find his corpse to obtain the King Stone. Darom finds the Kujira Mutant's cave and learns that Kotaro had been revived. Darom and the Komori Mutant then had some Gorgom worshippers capture the Kujira Mutant as bait for Kotaro. After Black threw himself in front of the Kujira Mutant, he then used his King Stone Flash to deflect Darom's attack before killing him with the Rider Kick.

Darom is voiced by Shōzō Iizuka (飯塚 昭三, Iizuka Shōzō).

===== Baraom =====
High Priest Baraom (大神官バラオム, Daishinkan Baraomu; 1-36) is one of the High Priests and has a stone-like green face. Baraom can discharge deadly laser beams from his robotic hands. He is usually in charge of the deployment of Gorgom's Mutants. After sacrificing his "Stone of Ocean" to revive Shadow Moon, Baraom is reborn as Grand Mutant Baraom (大怪人バラオム, Daikaijin Baraomu; 36-46), a smilodon-like creature with tusks. In this form, Baraom can wield tusk-shaped weapons along with his natural abilities. After Bishium's destruction, Baraom trained himself to avenge her and even got the Kujira Mutant to help him. Baraom started to use his superhuman speed to overwhelm Black before the Kujira Mutant betrays him. Before succumbing to the Rider Kick, Baraom mentions that Shadow Moon will finish him off.

Baraom is voiced by Toshimichi Takahashi (高橋 利道, Takahashi Toshimichi).

===== Bishium =====
High Priestess Bishium (大神官ビシュム, Daishinkan Bishumu; 1-36) is a High Priestess having her face divided between black and white, and a clear film covers most of her face. She can discharge laser beams from her eyes. After sacrificing her "Stone of Earth" to revive Shadow Moon, Bishium is reborn as Grand Mutant Bishium (大怪人ビシュム, Daikaijin Bishumu; 36-45), a white-haired pterosaur-like creature. In this form, she still has her usual powers and she can spin around to create twisters. When it came to the final confrontation with Black, she tried to get the King Stone from Kotaro by taking control of the mothers and capturing Kyoko. In the conflict, Bishium held Black so that Shadow Moon can shoot a beam that will rip out Kotaro's King Stone. It failed as Bishium is destroyed by that beam.

Bishium is portrayed by Hitomi Yoshii (好井 ひとみ, Yoshii Hitomi).

==== Komouri Mutant ====
Koumori Mutant (コウモリ怪人, Kōmori Kaijin; 1-49, 1st Movie) is a bat monster and main Gorgom Mutant servant of Gorgom's High Priests. It is a good expert at trailing specific people. This monster uses Echolocation to seek out its targets.

==== Bilgenia ====
Kensei Bilgenia (剣聖ビルゲニア, Kensei Birugenia; 18-35) is the legendary warrior among the Gorgom clad in a birkenia-themed armor. Bilgenia was born 30,000 years ago on a day of the solar eclipse like Kotaro Minami and Nobuhiko Akizuki. However, the Creation King did not favor him and therefore did not give him a King Stone. He was then sealed in a coffin for almost trying to revolt against him. The three High Priests awakened him when the Creation King reprimanded them for not doing their job in killing Black, ordering them to release the curse on the coffin Bilgenia was imprisoned in. He was both a pain for Kamen Rider Black as well as to Gorgom. In episode 22, he turned his face white from 30,0000 years ago, making him more powerful and more arrogant. In episode 25, he had Yoichi Daimon's pupil Egami create the Hellshooter: an equivalent to Road Sector. He used it to challenge Kamen Rider Black and Road Sector only for the Hellshooter to be destroyed. During Gorgom's latest attempt to use Kyoko's life force to awaken Shadow Moon, Bilgenia stole the Satan Saber and attacked the High Priests before running off with Kyoko and going after Black to take his King Stone for himself. However, Kotaro and Kyoko manage to hide from Bilgenia as he decides to attack the city to flush Kotaro out by using his Satan Cross to cause anarchy with a group of young men. Arriving to the scene, Black battles Bilgenia until Shadow Moon finally awakens and he claims the Satan Saber, forcing Bilgenia to retreat as his influence wears off. Returning to the Gorgom shrine, Bilgenia fought Shadow Moon who disarmed and then killed him.

In Kamen Rider Black Sun, Bilgenia is an Ancient Armored Fish Kaijin (古代甲冑魚怪人, Kodai Katchū-gyo Kaijin). Originally a prominent member of the Gorgom movement in the 1970s, he grew dissatisfied with the Three High Priests' submission to Michinosuke Donami and forms a splinter faction of Gorgom alongside Kotaro, Nobuhiko, and Yukari, with the group stealing the Satansaber and kidnapping both Shinichi Donami and the Creation King. He soon betrays the group when he learns their true goal is to kill the Creation King and end Kaijin-kind and is imprisoned when the High Priests track the group down. Several years later, a now-adult Shinichi offers him a job as an enforcer and tasks him with tracking down the missing Kingstones. In his search, he becomes directly responsible for the deaths of Aoi Izumi's birth parents as well as forcibly transforming Aoi into a Kaijin. Aoi's transformation enrages Kotaro and allows him to evolve into his Kamen Rider form, with Bilgenia losing an arm in the ensuing fight. After failing numerous times to kill Aoi, Bilgenia resolves to follow her instead, giving her the film reel that reveals the truth about the origin of Kaijin and defending her from Donami's hit squad as she addresses the United Nations with the evidence. The battle costs Bilgenia his life and he dies standing up, with the broken Satansaber later being taken up by Aoi to slay Kotaro, who has become a new Creation King.

Bilgenia is portrayed by Jun Yoshida (吉田 淳, Yoshida Jun). His Kamen Rider Black Sun counterpart is portrayed by Takahiro Miura (三浦 貴大, Miura Takahiro).

==== Mara and Kara ====
The Handmaiden Mutants were created by Shadow Moon and are high ranks than the Three High Priests, consists of the silvery Mara (マーラ, Māra) and the golden Kara (カーラ, Kāra). Both handmaidens died during the collapse of Gorgom's base.

==== Human members ====
Gorgom allows any humans to join them, making them appealing offers that include being made into Kaijins as they can live for 5,000 years. In the series reboot, Kamen Rider Black Sun, these humans are masterminds that oversaw the Kaijin experiment and embedded themselves within the government's ruling party with Gorgom subservient to them before Nobuhiko took over the party. Other than Soichiro Akizuki, these are the additional human members of Gorgom.

Professor Hideomi Kuromatsu (黒松 英臣, Kuromatsu Hideomi; 1, 2, 4, 10, 14 & 19)
A scientist, Nobel Peace Prize winner, and Tohto University professor. He was Gorgom's chief scientist in converting humans (willing or not) into various mutants. He also has interchangeable hands for him to experiment on said humans, along with a cybernetic monocle that attaches over his right eye and back of his head. He uses his Tohto University job as a sanctuary for Gorgom's mutants and as a laboratory for conducting conversions for humans and for Mutant-related experiments. He was later killed for his repeated failures to eliminate Black with Bilgenia briefly assuming his appearance, after killing him
Ryuzaburo Sakata (坂田 龍三郎, Sakata Ryūzaburō; 2, 6, 8 & 38)
A politician who used his political and non-political connections in performing tasks that Gorgom could not expose themselves into, such as kidnapping or assassination. He was responsible for leading a pro-Gorgom political party known as the EP Party with Omiya. His current status is unknown.
Koichi Omiya (大宮 幸一, Ōmiya Kōichi; 2, 7 & 38)
The head of Omiya Konzern, he used his business connections in finance Gorgom's criminal and terrorist activities. Omiya is one of the EP Party's leaders with Sakata. His current status is unknown.
Yukari Tsukikage (月影 ゆかり, Tsukikage Yukari; 1 & 2)
One of Japan's most famous actresses. She was assassinated by the Hyō Mutant when she unintentionally mentioned that Kotaro and Nobuhiko were becoming Century Kings on their 19th birthday party.
Shigeru Sugiyama (杉山 茂, Sugiyama Shigeru; 10)
Believed to be a former JGSDF (Japanese Ground Self-Defense Forces) soldier, he uses his training to raise the Gorgom Destruction Team as a commando task force for Gorgom before Kotaro forced him to come to his senses.
Yoichi Daimon (大門 洋一, Daimon Yōichi; 12)
A scientist who was recruited by Gorgom to create Road Sector before the High Priests gave orders for mass production for their plans of world conquest. Convinced that the bike should not be used for evil means, he hid it in a safe place. When Gorgom discovered it, they sent the Kōmori Mutant to kill him and Hotaru, wife of his son Akira Daimon. Akira hid in the mountains and trained his son Kenichi on how to ride a motorbike in order to master Road Sector. Akira gave possession of Road Sector to Black to use for the good of mankind after he defeated the Kamikiri Mutant and saved Kenichi from Baraom and the Koumori Mutant.
Professor Takayama (高山教授, Takayama-kyōju; 24, 42)
Katsumi's biology teacher in the university. He is secretly the Coelacanth Mutant (シーラカンス怪人, Shīrakansu Kaijin), using his medicine to keep him from changing into his monstrous form when not on one of Gorgom's missions. As the Coelacanth Mutant, he can shoot electricity from its fingers, emit laser balls from his hands, and turn into an electrical ball. His research lab, known as the Takayama Research Laboratories, has an android staff and is where he takes the female college students he abducts to use his "Coelacanth DNA Injection" to turn them into female Gorgom soldiers. When Katsumi becomes the next target, Kotaro was attacked by Katsumi until he brought the Coelacanth Mutant out and escaped during the first battle with Katsumi in his clutches. With the help of some children (whom were really adults turned into children by de-aging medicine), Kotaro found the captive female college students just as Professor Takayama assumed his mutant form to a surprised Katsumi. The surviving kids got the captives out so Kotaro can fight. Once Kamen Rider BLACK destroyed Takayama/Coelacanth Mutant with the Rider Kick, the explosion destroyed Takayama Research Lab. Coelacanth Mutant was later revived as a Phantom Mutant.

===== Shinichi Donami =====
An antagonist exclusive to Kamen Rider Black Sun, Shinichi Donami (堂波 真一, Dōnami Shin'ichi) is the Gorgom Party's human liaison and Prime Minister of Japan in 2022. Shinichi inherited his role from his grandfather, the previous Prime Minister who oversaw the Kaijin experiments during the Second World War. Having played an indirect role in his grandfather forcing the Three High Priests into serving under him when they kidnapped him as a teen during the 1970s, Shinichi uses his connections in the present to abduct his country's undesirables for both Kaijin experimentation and exploitation. Eventually, forced to step down after his party and grandfather's ties to the Kaijin experiments were made public, Shinichi is murdered in an alleyway by Koumori and Nick.

Shinichi Donami is portrayed by Lou Ohshiba (ルー 大柴, Rū Ōshiba), while his younger self is portrayed by Oshiro Maeda (前田 旺志郎, Maeda Ōshirō).

==== Michinosuke Donami ====
Michinosuke Donami (堂波 道之助, Dōnami Michinosuke) is Prime Minister of Japan in 1972. During World War II, Michinosuke led a team of scientists in conducting human experimentation with the goal of creating living weapons of war. These experiments led to the birth of the first Creation King, making Michinosuke ultimately responsible for the existence of Kaijin. He effectively controls the Gorgom Party, forcing them to bend to his will.

Michinosuke Donami is portrayed by Lou Oshiba, who also portrays the present day Shinichi Donami.

==== Allies ====
- Doctor Takuya Ishida (石田 タクヤ博士, Ishida Takuya-hakase; 1 & 6): The head of the Ishida Psychiatric Lab. He turned several kidnapped artists into psychics and sent them to infiltrate various corporations in order to conduct economic sabotage. After the Eagle Mutant was destroyed, it is assumed that he was arrested by the police for his role in the kidnappings.

==== Gorgom Mutants ====
Gorgom Mutants (ゴルゴム怪人, Gorugomu Kaijin) are genetically altered half-beast humans possessing long life that lasts 5,500 years. For Gorgom's human members, being transformed into a Mutant is the ultimate reward for their loyalty. Each Mutant is based on an animal or plant lifeform. Among those Mutants were:

- Kumo Mutants (クモ怪人, Kumo Kaijin; 1): 5 spider monsters.
- Hyou Mutant (ヒョウ怪人, Hyō Kaijin; 2): A leopard monster.
- Kuwago Mutant (クワゴ怪人, Kuwago Kaijin; 3): A silkworm monster.
- Nomi Mutant (ノミ怪人, Nomi Kaijin; 4): A flea monster.
- Yagi Mutant (ヤギ怪人, Yagi Kaijin; 5): A goat monster.
- Oowashi Mutant (オオワシ怪人, Ōwashi Kaijin; 6): A Steller's sea eagle monster.
- Sai Mutant (サイ怪人, Sai Kaijin; 7): A rhinoceros monster.
- Semi Mutant (セミ怪人, Semi Kaijin; 8): A cicada monster.
- Hachi Mutant (ハチ怪人, Hachi Kaijin; 9): A bee monster.
- Tokage Mutant (トカゲ怪人, Tokage Kaijin; 10): A lizard monster.
- Saboten Mutant (サボテン怪人, Saboten Kaijin; 11): A cactus monster.
- Kani Mutant (カニ怪人, Kani Kaijin; 11 & 13): A crab monster.
- Mammoth Mutant (マンモス怪人, Manmosu Kaijin; 11 & 14): A mammoth monster said to be the strongest of Gorgom's monsters.
- Iwagame Mutant (イワガメ怪人, Iwagame Kaijin; 15): A tortoise monster.
- Hasamimushi Mutant (ハサミムシ怪人, Hasamimushi Kaijin; 16): An earwig monster.
- Baku Mutant (バク怪人, Baku Kaijin; 17): A tapir monster.
- Kuroneko Mutant (クロネコ怪人, Kuroneko Kaijin; 18): A black cat monster.
- Onizaru Mutant (オニザル怪人, Onizaru Kaijin; 19): An aye-aye monster.
- Anemone Mutant (アネモネ怪人, Anemone Kaijin; 20): An anemone monster.
- Tamamushi Mutant (タマムシ怪人, Tamamushi Kaijin; 21): A jewel beetle monster.
- Tsurugibachi Mutant (ツルギバチ怪人, Tsurugibachi Kaijin; 22): A wasp monster that has a wasp's abdomen for a right hand.
- Chameleon Mutant (カメレオン怪人, Kamereon Kaijin; 1st Movie): A chameleon monster.
- Ammonite Mutant (アンモナイト怪人, Anmonaito Kaijin; 23): An ammonite monster with two brains: a telekinetic brain and a fighting brain.
- Kamakiri Mutant (カマキリ怪人, Kamakiri Kaijin; 25): A mantis monster.
- Buffalo Mutant (バッファロー怪人, Baffarō Kajin; 26): A buffalo monster.
- Iraga Mutant (イラガ怪人, Iraga Kaijin; 11, 27): A slug moth monster.
- Koganemushi Mutant (コガネムシ怪人, Koganemushi Kaijin; 28): A scarab beetle monster.
- Armadillo Mutant (アルマジロ怪人, Arumajiro Kaijin; 29): An armadillo monster.
- Ika Mutant (イカ怪人, Ika Kaijin; 30): A squid monster.
- Yamaarashi Mutant (ヤマアラシ怪人, Yamaarashi Kaijin; 31): A porcupine monster.
- Kinoko Mutant (キノコ怪人, Kinoko Kaijin; 32): A mushroom monster.
- Benizake Mutant (ベニザケ怪人, Benizake Kaijin; 33): A red salmon monster with salmon-like heads for hands.
- Kera Mutant (ケラ怪人, Kera Kaijin; 36 & 37): A mole cricket monster.
- Nezumi Mutant (ネズミ怪人, Nezumi Kaijin; 36 & 38): A rat monster.
- Tsunozame Mutant (ツノザメ怪人, Tsunozame Kaijin; 2nd Movie): A dogfish monster.
- Phantom Mutants (亡霊怪人, Bōrei Kaijin; 2nd Movie & 42): Phantom monsters who assisted the Tsunozame Mutant. The Gorgom Mutants revived as phantoms in movie 2 are Nomi, Yagi, Sai, Oowashi, Iwagame, Anemone, Tsurugibachi, Ammonite, Coelacanth, and Kamakiri Mutant. Another set of phantom monsters who assist Hae Mutant are Kumo, Kuwago, Sai, Saboten, Kamikiri, Coelacanth, Iraga, Kinoko, Benizake and Nezumi Mutant.
- Mukade Mutant (ムカデ怪人, Mukade Kaijin; 36 & 39): A centipede monster.
- Sanshouuo Mutant (サンショウウオ怪人, Sanshōuo Kaijin; 40): A salamander monster.
- Cobra Mutant (コブラ怪人, Kobura Kaijin; 41): A cobra monster.
- Hae Mutant (ハエ怪人, Hae Kaijin; 42): A fly monster.
- Kuwagata Mutant (クワガタ怪人, Kuwagata Kaijin; 36 & 43): A stag beetle monster.
- Togeuo Mutant (トゲウオ怪人, Togeuo Kaijin; 11, 36, 50 & 51): A stickleback monster.
- Fleeing Mutants (50): These three unspecified monsters tried to escape from Gorgom's headquarters when they heard that Kamen Rider Black was coming. They were killed by Stickleback Mutant. (Note: Parts of their costumes were recycled and altered versions of the Mole Cricket Mutant, the Rat Mutant, and the Salamander Mutant with the Mole Cricket Mutant's costume being recolored green and given a one-eyed head, the Rat Mutant's costume having its bucktooth removed and a hairless part added to the top of its head, and the Salamander Mutant's costume being given larger red lips.)

=== Crisis Empire ===
The main villains from Kamen Rider Black RX, the Crisis Empire (クライシス帝国, Kuraishisu Teikoku) are a group of mutants and cyborg lifeforms who attempt to invade Earth. They always attempted to justify their invasion and their plans to exterminate the human race. They also claimed that their home planet was being sucked into a black hole. Since they thought that humans do not really care about their planet, the Crisis Empire thought it was right for them to take over Earth. The group under Jark are based on the Crise Fortress (クライス要塞, Kuraisu Yōsai) battleship.

Based on the Kaima World (怪魔界, Kaimakai; lit. "Strange Demon World"), the original dimensional world where the great Crisis Empire resided. It used to be connected to Earth through a dimensional portal in the distant peaceful past until the rise of Grand Lord Crisis. The portal were sealed off by the people of Kaima World who opposed the rule of the Emperor. With the dimensional connection severed, the two worlds drifted apart and the past was forgotten. The finale reveals that the kaima World is an exact 'mirror' world of Earth itself.

Grand Lord Crisis blames the dying of their world as an effect coming from the pollution of Earth's environment by mankind, contradicting Professor Walter's explanation that the world's condition was caused by the evil ways of the Crisis Emperor. In the end of the battle, Grand Lord Crisis claimed that as long as mankind lives on "the pollution they caused", there would always be another Kaima World. - hinting the possible existence of parallel worlds. His death causes the Kaima World to explode as well.

==== Emperor Crisis ====
Emperor Crisis (クライシス皇帝, Kuraishisu-kōtei; 42, 46 & 47) is the ruling dictator of the Crisis Empire, a giant head with tendrils and three small faces on his forehead, who is not seen but mentioned several times throughout the series yet based on Crisis City at the Empire's home world. His voice was first heard where Gedorian eventually appeased his wrath, later appearing in the shadows to give General Jark the power he requested to have. He eventually offered Black RX the chance to become his new right hand by offering him Earth. But, he was destroyed by RX's Revolcane, with his dimension ceasing to exist as a result while claiming his immorality ensured his return as long as evil exists.

Emperor Crisis is voiced by Gorō Naya (納谷 悟朗, Naya Gorō).

==== General Jark ====
General Jark (ジャーク将軍, Jāku-shōgun; 1-46) is a military leader of the empire and supreme commander of the invasion army. Wearing a golden face mask and a black cape, Jark has the loyalty of most under him as he initially leading the attacks until Crisis arrived. He actually does care about his subordinates even to save Maribaron from being killed by Dasmader. Towards the end of the series, he was forcefully transformed by Crisis into a stronger warrior called Jark Midla (ジャークミドラ, Jāku Midora) to kill RX. In the process, Jark Midla easily murdered the Sahara parents and defeated V3 and Riderman while X and Amazon rescued the Sahara children from his grasp. When he was in the middle of battle, the Sahara kids attacked him before RX as Robo Rider shielded them and transformed into Bio Rider. After Dasmader abandoned him for his failures, he was killed by RX using his Revolcane. Regressed to his normal form and near death, he proclaimed Crisis was too powerful even for RX.

General Jark is voiced by Seizō Katō (加藤 精三, Katō Seizō). In episodes 45 and 46, he is voiced by Hidekatsu Shibata (柴田 秀勝, Shibata Hidekatsu), who then voices Evil Eye in Kamen Rider Seigi no Keifu.

==== Four Officers ====
The Four Officers (四大隊長, Yondai Taichō) are Jark's four followers who carry out the attacks on Earth.

===== Maribaron =====
Intelligence Staff Officer Maribaron (諜報参謀マリバロン, Chōhō Sanbō Maribaron; 1-47) is the sorceress of the State, a human-looking officer in black and red armor from a noble family outside the Crisisians with feelings for Jark. She uses the yellow feather on her helmet as a weapon or to send messages, along with using a laser whip and breathe fire. She cares for her comrades, displaying it when Lord Crisis' living heir Garonia dies in a freak accident on their watch and she attempts to cover it up by kidnapping Hitomi to take her place. Though Jark learned the truth, he allows Maribaron to take the girl to the Miraculous Valley to complete her plan. But when Kotaro saves Hitomi, Maribaron is advised by Jark to make a false report that the princess was killed by Black RX. When Granzyrus arrives, Maribaron revived the spirits of 10 soldiers Kotaro killed to finish off the other riders. She was eventually shocked to learn that Dasmader was Grand Lord Crisis' mobile body, killed by Crisis when she objected to his decision to have Black RX join them after all the trouble he caused them.

Maribaron is portrayed by Atsuko Takahata (高畑 淳子, Takahata Atsuko).

===== Bosgun =====
Naval Commander Bosgun (海兵隊長ボスガン, Kaihei Taichō Bosugan; 1-44) is a Crisisian dressed in a blue-green naval coat and white tights who wields a jagged sword and dagger. He wears a white helmet with a red visor and a tiny face on his forehead, which seems to be his actual face. He is in charge of the Man-Beast/Mutant unit, occasionally flaunting his Crisisian heritage to the other officers as he sees them to be inferior to him. He once plotted to take over General Jark but his plans were foiled when one of his swords was destroyed by General Jark himself upon discovering his treachery when he lost to RX twice. He died fighting when he was stabbed by the Revolcane during the arrival of Granzyrus.

Bosgun is voiced by Shōzō Iizuka (飯塚 昭三, Iizuka Shōzō), who also voiced High Priest Darom as seen above.

===== Gatezone =====
Armored Officer Gatezone (機甲隊長ガテゾーン, Kikō Taichō Gatezōn; 1-43) is a blue robotic biker in a leather jacket, slack, and one red eye on his face. In charge of the Robot unit, he took to fight Black RX occasionally. He wields a blaster and a powerful motorcycle called the Storm Dagger. Gatenzone had the ability to detach his own head from his body. His body could still move on its own without his head. In his final episode, He died fighting Black RX while attempting a suicide bomb (with his head separated from his body) attack, with only his head remaining before it was shattered by his own laser beams reflected by Black RX.

Gatezone is voiced by Toshimichi Takahashi (高橋 利道, Takahashi Toshimichi), who also voiced High Priest Baraom as seen above.

===== Gedorian =====
Fanged Captain Gedorian (牙隊長ゲドリアン, Kiba Taichō Gedorian; 1-42) is a small, unusual creature who owed his life to Jark and is one of his most loyal minions. He is constantly hopping about and annoying everyone else. He is the most cowardly and is quick to ditch a battle before it's even over. He was soon targeted by Dasmader, Gatezone and Bosgun when Grand Lord Crisis was about to destroy them all, but he soon gave his life to ensure the others avoid Crisis' wrath when he transferred his life energy into Gedolridol before his monster died at Black RX's hands.

Gedorian is voiced by Kazunori Arai (新井 一典, Arai Kazunori).

==== Colonel Dasmader ====
Sent by Lord Crisis, Colonel Dasmader (ダスマダー大佐, Dasumadā-taisa; 28-30 & 33-47) is an inspector whose task is to put the invasion party back on track, receiving utter contempt by his peers due to his arrogance. Dasmader could fire a green laser, with a shape of a tiger's head from his helmet for combat. He was almost killed by both General Jark and Black RX. He later leads Gatezawn and Bosgun in the attempt to kill Gedorian to appease Crisis' anger. In episode 47, he was killed along with Crisis Fortress by Black RX.

Colonel Dasmader is portrayed by Tetsuya Matsui (松井 哲也, Matsui Tetsuya).

==== Kaima Soldiers ====
The monsters used by the Crisis Empire are referred to as Kaima Soldiers (怪魔戦士, Kaima Senshi; "strange demon"). There are four branches each led by an Officer. While Granzyrus appears on Earth, Maribaron uses her power to revive members of each other armies.

===== Kaima Supernatural Clan =====
The Kaima Supernatural Clan (怪魔妖族, Kaima Yōzoku) unit consists of supernatural-powered Kaimas that are used by Maribaron and possess supernatural abilities.

- Skullma (スカル魔, Sukaruma; 1, 2 Movie & 45): A horned Grim Reaper-style monster with a scythe and assisted by two Skullmastars.
  - Skullmastars (スカル魔スター, Sukarumasutā; 1, 2, 9, 19, Movie, 32 & 42): Hornless versions of Skullma. Following Skullma's self-destruction, the Skullmastars live on to serve the Crisis Empire on different occasions.
- Bujin (武陣; 7): A silver-armored warlord with ability to harness the sun's rays and use them a weapon as well as move through anything that's reflective.
- Zunojin (ズノー陣, Zunōjin; 12 & 45): A dream-manipulating elf/alien-like monster.
- Byakki (ビャッ鬼; 20): A green and white-furred Demonic shaman monster with bat wings for ears.
- Ganma (岩魔; 32): A plant-covered soil-manipulating rock monster.
- Wilki (ウィル鬼, Wiruki; 35): A one-horned bluish demon/imp monster who wields a pitchfork.
- Tenku (天空, Tenkū; 38): An unspecified baboon-faced Yōkai monster. She appeared in the form of a powerful fortune teller and miracle healer that lured people to help build a city for Crisis.
- Hundred-Eyed Hag (百目婆ァ, Hyakume Babaa; 41): A multi-eyed Hyakume monster who is Maribaron's aunt and a somewhat very powerful witch.

===== Kaima Robot =====
The Kaima Robot (怪魔ロボット, Kaima Robotto) unit is led by Gatezawn and composed of various androids built by Gatezawn.

- Cublican (キューブリカン, Kyūburikan; 2): A robot Gatezawn sent after Kotaro in the guise of man after stealing some of Hayami's clothes.
- Gungadin (ガンガディン, Gangadin; 4): A large robot with tank treads instead of legs.
- Scryde (スクライド, Sukuraido; 11): A mummy-like robot that was originally destroyed by Lord Crisis years ago for being too powerful for the Crisis Empire to control.
- Deathgaron (デスガロン, Desugaron; 14, 15 & Movie): An insectoid robot.
- Triplon (トリプロン, Toripuron; 15-17 & Movie): A crab-like robot that first appeared in its splintered form: Triplon Unit 1 (トリプロン1号, Toripuron Ichigō) and the humanoid Triplon Unit 2 (トリプロン2号, Toripuron Nigō) and Triplon Unit 3 (トリプロン3号, Toripuron Sangō). Triplon is deployed to the Desert of Death to execute Deathgaron for his incompetence before serving as an escort to Maribaron. When Nexticker is destroyed, the Triplon Units capture Shigeru and overwhelm Kotaro and Joe before they are captured. But when RX achieves the form of Bio Rider, the Triplon Units dock into United Triplon (合体トリプロン, Gattai Toripuron) which Bio Rider destroys with his Bio Blade. He returned in the Kamen Rider Black RX movie to assist Deathgaron, Gynagiskhan, and Musarabisara into attacking the Kamen Riders only to be destroyed by a team Rider Kick.
- Nexticker (ネックスティッカー, Nekkusutikkā; 16): A blue scorpion-like robot sent to attack Kotaro while he was looking for Hitomi.
- Croyzel (クロイゼル, Kuroizeru; 19): An insectoid robot that can manipulate heat.
- Metaheavy (メタヘビー, Metahebī; 30 & 45): A pyrokinetic insectoid robot.
- Elgitron (エレギトロン, Erugitoron; 31 & 45): An electrokinetic cattle-headed robot.
- Schraigin (シュライジン, Shuraijin; 34): An Asura-like robot.
- Spingrey (スピングレー, Supingurē; 39): A robotic race car-resembling monster.
- Helgadem (ヘルガデム, Herugademu; 43): A silver demonic samurai robot.

===== Kaima Beast-Man =====
The Kaima Beast-Man (怪魔獣人, Kaima Jūjin) unit is led by Bosgun, composed of mutants and animal-like humanoid aliens.

- Gynagiskhan (ガイナギスカン, Gainagisukan; 3 & Movie): Known as the "Knight of Wind" (風の騎士, Kaze no Kishi), Gynagiskhan was an insectoid-like horseman. He brought Kotaro and his friends into the Desert of Fierce Winds where Walter and followers were exiled. After killing Walter, Gynagiskhan battles RX with Reiko's musical necklace disrupted Gynagiskhan enough for RX to kill him with the Revolcane. He returned in the Kamen Rider Black RX movie to assist Deathgaron, United Triplon, and Musarabisara into attacking the Kamen Riders only to be destroyed by a team Rider Kick.
- Gynagamoth (ガイナガモス, Gainagamosu; 5): A three-eyed green moth monster.
- Gynamite (ガイナマイト, Gainamaito; 8): A black-haired crab monster.
- Gynabalas (ガイナバラス, Gainabarasu; 23): An unspecified monster with long horns and blue black and white spot over his body.
- Gynakamakil (ガイナカマキル, Gainakamakiru; 25 & 45): A black-haired mantis monster.
- Gynagingam (ガイナギンガム, Gainagingamu; 26): A long-necked turtle monster.
- Gynaninpo (ガイナニンポー, Gainaninpō; 37 & 45): An Japanese macaque monster that leads the Devil Beastman Ninja Corps.
- Gynajagram (ガイナジャグラム, Gainajaguramu; 40): A tiger-like monster.

===== Kaima Alien Lifeforms =====
The Kaima Alien Lifeforms (怪魔異生獣, Kaima Iseijū) unit is led by Captain Gedorian, mostly consisting of alien lifeform/Earth organism hybrids.

- Culculten (キュルキュルテン, Kyurukyuruten; 6 & 45): Three toad-like alien parasites.
- Atchpetchy (アッチペッチー, Atchipetchī; 9): A cactus-like alien monster composed of jaw-like pincers.
- Dogmalogma (ドグマログマ, Dogumaroguma; 10): A slithering grayish-white blob-like alien monster with tentacles for arms.
- Flarmiglarmi (フラーミグラーミ, Furāmigurāmi; 13): A jellyfish/squid-like alien monster.
- Musalabisala (ムサラビサラ, Musarabisara; 18): A flying squirrel-like alien monster.
- Bang-Gong (バングゴング, Bangugongu; 21): A blue slug-like alien monster who can shapeshift and transform into a shadow.
- Antront (アントロント, Antoronto; 22 & 45): A white-haired ant-like alien monster.
- Lickback (リックバック, Rikkubakku; 24): A water flea-like alien monster with scythe-blades for hands and water flea-like legs between its upper back and shoulders.
- Matbot (マットボット, Mattobotto; 27): A white-haired elephant-like alien monster with crab claws for hands.
- Gimelagomela (ギメラゴメラ, Gimeragomera; 28): An alien monster that had small dragon-like heads for hands, an ostrich/chicken head and neck, a snake's tail, and an extra humanoid mouth on its belly.
- Mundayganday (ムンデガンデ, Mundegande; 29): A cicada-like alien monster with a centipede-like parasite on it.
- Gazolagezola (ガゾラゲゾラ, Gazoragezora; 33): A brown crayfish-like alien monster with octopus tentacles on his hips and smaller ones for hair.
- Balunbolun (バルンボルン, Barunborun; 36): A cyclopean alien monster with an elephant-like trunk for a mouth.
- Gedolridol (ゲドルリドル, Gedoruridoru; 42): A caterpillar/louse-like alien monster with his mouth-like hands. Gedorian sacrificed his life energy to power it up. He was destroyed by RX's Revolcane.

==== Others ====
- Chief Cabinet Secretary Robo Chakram (官房長ロボ・チャックラム, Kanbōchō Robo Chakkuramu; 1, 2, 4, 5, 8, 12-15, 21, 37 & 47): A small robot that announces Jark's arrival before his subordinates and transmits messages from Crisis himself. He was destroyed by Kamen Rider Black RX before the final battle with Dasmader. Voiced by Atsuo Mori (森 篤夫, Mori Atsuo).
- Chaps (チャップ, Chappu): The Crisis Empire's foot soldiers. They come in three colors: gray, brown and black. They later wear capes for the final four episodes of the series. The last of them were finished by the original 10 Kamen Riders before Black RX battles Dasmader.
- Devil Beastman Ninja Corps (悪魔獣人忍者隊, Akuma Jūjin Ninja-tai; 37): A group of ape monsters in ninja attire that serve Gynaninpo. Destroyed by Black RX as Bio Rider.
- Strongest Monster Granzyrus (最強怪人グランザイラス, Saikyō Kaijin Guranzairasu; 44 & 45): A cyborg Styracosaurus-like Kaima Soldier which was Emperor Crisis' best soldier and worked with Bosgun when summoned to Earth. The 10 veteran Kamen Rider team arrived to help fight Granzyrus. After killing Bosgun, RX became Bio Rider upon being doused by the water summoned by Kyoko. Bio Rider turned into water and rode the water summoned by Kyoko into Granzyrus. Once inside, Bio Rider brought out his BioBlade and destroyed the monster from the inside out. Though Bio Rider managed to get out in time as revealed when he aided the 11 veteran Kamen Rider team against the Spirit World Inhumanoid Army that Maribaron summoned.
- Spirit World Monster Army (霊界怪人軍団, Reikai Kaijin Gundan; 45): When Kotaro was thought dead following Granzyrus' destruction, Maribaron revived some of the monsters as ghosts where they resembled greyed versions of themselves because of this appearance. The monsters revived are Skullma, Zunojin, Metaheavy, Elgitron, Gynakamakil, Gynaninpo, the lead Culculten, and Antront. Maribaron unleashed the Spirit World Inhumanoid Army to attack the 10 veteran Kamen Rider team. The Spirit World Inhumanoid Army was destroyed by Bio Rider.

=== Evil Eye ===
Evil Eye (邪眼, Jāgan) is the main antagonist of PlayStation 2-exclusive survival horror action game, Kamen Rider: Seigi no Keifu, which starred the cast from Kamen Rider (1971), Kamen Rider V3, Kamen Rider BLACK, and guest starring two Heisei Kamen Riders from Kamen Rider Agito. Fifty thousand years ago, he was once a competitor for who lost the contest of becoming one of the co-founding Century King of Golgom. He is later resurrected in 2001 in response to the power of unknown darkness originating from Shocker's time machine. Immediately align with Shocker and Destron, then kidnapped a doctor from V3's timeline, Tadokoro, he gains the moniker "Evil Eye" and abilities to both alter time or create distortions through a form of purple aurora. Among the era that got affected into a collision by his power are in November 1972 (during original Double Riders' fight against Gel Shocker), January 1974 (during V3 and Riderman's fights against Marshal Armor's Destron army), August 1988 (two months after Shadow Moon's resurgence) and April 2004 (take place three months after the defeat of Lord/Unknown race, and nine months before the ending segment of Kamen Rider Agito run-in). Its goal is to steal two fragments of Kingstones from Kamen Rider BLACK or Shadow Moon, to obtain a humanoid-sized Kamen Rider-like ultimate form and earn the Creation King title for himself, in additions to dispose his greastest threat, the Agito's Seed. Despite this, he is destroyed by both Kamen Rider 1, V3, BLACK and Agito, restoring the timelines back to normal.

Evil Eye is voiced by Hidekatsu Shibata, who also voices General Jark in episode 45 and 46 of Kamen Rider BLACK.
