= Kamen Rider Black =

Tokusatsu superhero-drama television series

- Also known as: Masked Rider Black; Black Kamen Rider
- Genre: Tokusatsu; Superhero fiction Science fiction Action/Adventure; Dark Fantasy; Drama; Conspiracy
- Created by: Shotaro Ishinomori
- Based on: Have You Seen The Kamen Rider?! by Shotaro Ishinomori
- Written by: Shōzō Uehara (1-12); Noboru Sugimura (13-51)
- Directed by: Yoshiaki Kobayashi
- Starring: Tetsuo Kurata; Takahito Horiuchi; Akemi Inoue; Ayumi Taguchi; Hitomi Yoshii; Jun Yoshida
- Voices of: Shōzō Iizuka; Toshimichi Takahashi; Masaki Terasoma
- Narrated by: Kiyoshi Kobayashi; Issei Masamune
- Music by: Eiji Kawamura
- Country of origin: Japan
- No. of episodes: 51

Production
- Running time: 20–25 minutes
- Production companies: Ishimori Productions; Toei Company; Mainichi Broadcasting System

Original release
- Network: JNN (MBS, TBS)
- Release: October 4, 1987 – October 9, 1988

Related
- Kamen Rider Super-1; Kamen Rider Black RX

Kamen Rider Black (仮面ライダーBLACK, Kamen Raidā Burakku) is a Japanese tokusatsu superhero-drama television series. It is the eighth installment in the Kamen Rider series and a co-production between Mainichi Broadcasting System and Toei. The series aired on all Japan News Network affiliates from October 4, 1987, to October 9, 1988. For distribution purposes, Toei refers to this television series as Masked Rider Black.

The series has spawned a manga adaptation that ran in Shōnen Sunday during its broadcast; a direct sequel, Kamen Rider Black RX, in 1988; and a reboot, Kamen Rider Black Sun, in 2022.

== Synopsis ==
The Creation King is the pinnacle of the evil cult Gorgom. As his life begins to extinguish, the elected Creation King will inherit his power. On the night of their 19th birthday, stepbrothers Kotaro Minami and Nobuhiko Akizuki were kidnapped by Gorgom and submitted to a mutant cyborg surgery to become the candidates for the next Gorgom Creation King. Both of them are called Century Kings and are destined to best each other in a final battle - whoever wins will become the next Creation King. Kotaro escaped before getting brainwashed (which is the final step in the surgery), with help from his foster father, and turned against Gorgom. He soon finds out the horrific truth from his stepfather: Gorgom originally killed his true parents and, since both Kotaro and Nobuhiko were born on the day of a solar eclipse, are referred to as "Black Sun" and "Shadow Moon". Kotaro, taking on the name of Kamen Rider Black, was determined to rescue his stepbrother from Gorgom while protecting Japan. However, later in the series, Nobuhiko emerged as Shadow Moon to fight Kotaro with the survivor becoming the next Creation King.

== Episodes ==
1. Black!! Transform (BLACK！！変身, Burakku!! Henshin) (Original Airdate: October 4, 1987)
2. The Mutant Party (怪人パーティ, Kaijin Pātī) (Original Airdate: October 11, 1987)
3. Strange? Strange Cyborgs (怪？怪・改造人間, Kai? Kai Kaizō Ningen) (Original Airdate: October 18, 1987)
4. The Devil's Laboratory (悪魔の実験室, Akuma no Jikkenshitsu) (Original Airdate: October 25, 1987)
5. Run Through the Maze, Kotaro (迷路を走る光太郎, Meiro o Hashiru Kōtarō) (Original Airdate: November 1, 1987)
6. Riddle Of The Secret Espers (秘密透視のなぞ, Himitsu Tōshi no Nazo) (Original Airdate: November 8, 1987)
7. The Regenerated Bio-Machine (復元する生体メカ, Fukugen Suru Seitai Meka) (Original Airdate: November 15, 1987)
8. The Devil's Trill (悪魔のトリル, Akuma no Toriru) (Original Airdate: November 22, 1987)
9. Bishum's Red Lips (ビシュムの紅い唇, Bishumu no Akai Kuchibiru) (Original Airdate: November 29, 1987)
10. Where's Nobuhiko? (信彦はどこに？, Nobuhiko wa Doko ni?) (Original Airdate: December 6, 1987)
11. The Starving Mutants (飢えた怪人たち, Ueta Kaijin-tachi) (Original Airdate: December 13, 1987)
12. Birth Of The Super Machine Legend (超マシン伝説誕生, Chō Mashin Densetsu Tanjō) (Original Airdate: December 20, 1987)
13. My Mom Is A Mutant Nanny (ママは怪人養育係, Mama wa Kaijin Yōikugakari) (Original Airdate: December 27, 1987)
14. The Day The Tuna Disappeared (マグロが消えた日, Maguro ga Kieta Hi) (Original Airdate: January 10, 1988)
15. The Targeted Ghoul School (狙われた怪奇学園, Newareta Kaiki Gakuen) (Original Airdate: January 17, 1988)
16. My Friend! Go Beyond The Sea (友よ！海を越えて, Tomo yo! Umi o Koete) (Original Airdate: January 24, 1988)
17. Kyoko's Strange Dream (杏子の不思議な夢, Kyōko no Fushigi na Yume) (Original Airdate: January 31, 1988)
18. Sword Saint Bilgenia!! (剣聖ビルゲニア！！, Kensei Birugenia!!) (Original Airdate: February 7, 1988)
19. The Suffocating Trap Of Hell (息づまる地獄の罠, Ikidzumaru Jigoku no Wana) (Original Airdate: February 14, 1988)
20. Rider's Grave (ライダーの墓場, Raidā no Hakaba) (Original Airdate: February 21, 1988)
21. Clash! The Two Super Machines (激突！二大マシン, Gekitotsu! Ni Dai Mashin) (Original Airdate: February 28, 1988)
22. The Shadow That Stalks Dad (パパを襲う黒い影, Papa o Osō Kuroi Kage) (Original Airdate: March 6, 1988)
23. Marumo's Magical Powers (マルモの魔法の力, Marumo no Mahō no Chikara) (Original Airdate: March 13, 1988)
24. The Female College Student's Nightmare (女子大生の悪夢, Joshidaisei no Akumu) (Original Airdate: March 20, 1988)
25. The Roaring Armed Machine (爆走する武装メカ, Bakusō Suru Busō Meka) (Original Airdate: April 3, 1988)
26. Rescue The Psychic Girl (超能力少女を救え, Chōnōryoku Shōjo o Sukue) (Original Airdate: April 10, 1988)
27. Fire Breathing Danger Road (火を噴く危険道路, Hi o Fuku Kiken Dōro) (Original Airdate: April 17, 1988)
28. Scarab Beetle's Invitation To Hell (地獄へ誘う黄金虫, Jigoku e Sasō Koganemushi) (Original Airdate: April 24, 1988)
29. The Targeted Death Mask (獲物はデスマスク？, Emono wa Desu Masuku?) (Original Airdate: May 1, 1988)
30. Aloha to an Assassin! (暗殺者にアロハ！, Ansatsusha ni Aroha!) (Original Airdate: May 8, 1988)
31. Burn! Boy Warriors (燃えよ！少年戦士, Moe yo! Shōnen Senshi) (Original Airdate: May 15, 1988)
32. Dream Girl Yuki (夢少女・ユキ, Yume Shōjo Yuki) (Original Airdate: May 22, 1988)
33. Father, Son And The River Of Love (父と子の愛の河, Chichi to Ko no Ai no Kawa) (Original Airdate: May 29, 1988)
34. Revival?! The Prince of Hell (復活？！地獄王子, Fukkatsu?! Jigoku Ōji) (Original Airdate: June 5, 1988)
35. Showdown! The Two Princes (対決！二人の王子, Taiketsu! Futari no Ōji) (Original Airdate: June 12, 1988)
36. The War Declaration of Love and Death (愛と死の宣戦布告, Ai to Shi no Sensen Fukoku) (Original Airdate: June 19, 1988)
37. Memories of Yubari's Sky (想い出は夕張の空, Omoide wa Yūbari no Sora) (Original Airdate: June 26, 1988)
38. Mystery!? The EP-Party Boy Squad (謎！？ＥＰ党少年隊, Nazo!? Ī Pī Tō Shōnentai) (Original Airdate: July 3, 1988)
39. The Idol's Poison Fangs (アイドルの毒牙, Aidoru no Dokuga) (Original Airdate: July 10, 1988)
40. Secret Of The Karate Master (カラテ名人の秘密, Karate Meijin no Himitsu) (Original Airdate: July 17, 1988)
41. The Dangerous Time Thief (あぶない時間泥棒, Abunai Jikan Dorobō) (Original Airdate: July 24, 1988)
42. Tokyo Mutant Gathering (東京-怪人大集合, Tōkyō - Kaijin Daishūgō) (Original Airdate: July 31, 1988)
43. Battle at the Mutant Farm! (怪人牧場の決闘！, Kaijin Bokujō no Kettō!) (Original Airdate: August 7, 1988)
44. An Ocean Inside The Closet (タンスの中は海！, Tansu no Naka wa Umi) (Original Airdate: August 14, 1988)
45. Death Of Flower Mutant Bishum (妖花ビシュムの死, Yōka Bishumu no Shi) (Original Airdate: August 21, 1988)
46. Baraom's Fierce Death (壮絶バラオムの死, Sōzetsu Baraomu no Shi) (Original Airdate: August 28, 1988)
47. Death of the Rider! (ライダー死す！, Raidā Shisu!) (Original Airdate: September 4, 1988)
48. Bouquet of Reminiscence, Into The Ocean (海に追憶の花束を, Umi ni Tsuioku no Hanataba o) (Original Airdate: September 11, 1988)
49. Fierce Battle! Death Of Darom (激闘！ダロムの死, Gekitō! Daromu no Shi) (Original Airdate: September 18, 1988)
50. The Creation King's True Form? (創世王の正体は？, Sōsei Ō no Shōtai wa?) (Original Airdate: October 2, 1988)
51. Gorgom's Last Day (ゴルゴム最期の日, Gorugomu Saigo no Hi) (Original Airdate: October 9, 1988)

== Related media ==
=== TV specials ===
- 1987: This is Kamen Rider Black!! (これが仮面ライダーＢＬＡＣＫだ!!, Kore ga Kamen Raidā Burakku da!!) - It was broadcast one week before the first episode, and introduces the character Kamen Rider Black.
- 1988: Kamen Rider 1 Through RX: Big Gathering (仮面ライダー１号～ＲＸ大集合, Kamen Raidā Ichigō~Āru Ekkusu Daishūgō) - It covers all the heroes, from Kamen Rider 1 until ZX, and introduces Kamen Rider Black RX.

=== Films ===
- Kamen Rider Black: Hurry to Onigashima (仮面ライダーＢＬＡＣＫ 鬼ヶ島へ急行せよ, Kamen Raidā Burakku Onigashima e Kyūkō seyo)

Released on March 12, 1988 (between episodes 22 and 23) as part of the Toei Manga Matsuri film festival. Originally known simply as Kamen Rider Black during its theatrical release. Children all over Tokyo mysteriously disappear without warning. Kotaro suspects that the Gorgom are behind the abductions and follows a suspicious-looking tour bus with children on it, only to lose its trail off a cliff. With the help of a fisherman (played by Ishinomori himself), Kotaro travels to a remote island and uses his abilities as Kamen Rider Black to save the kids and foil Gorgom's latest evil scheme.

- Kamen Rider Black: Terrifying! The Phantom House of Devil Pass (仮面ライダーＢＬＡＣＫ 恐怖!悪魔峠の怪人館, Kamen Raidā Burakku Kyōfu! Akumatōge no Kaijinkan)

Released on July 9, 1988 (between episodes 38 and 39) as part of the Toei Manga Matsuri film festival. The city of Yūbari, Hokkaidō has become a ghost town following the presence of Shadow Moon and his minions of Gorgom. Makino, a scientist working on Gorgom's top-secret robot experiment, escapes from the evil organization and returns to Tokyo, only to find out that his wife and daughter have been abducted. As Kamen Rider Black, Kotaro travels to Yubari to save Makino's family and liberate the town from Shadow Moon's evil grasp.

- Kamen Rider Decade: All Riders vs. Dai-Shocker (劇場版 仮面ライダーディケイド オールライダー対大ショッカー, Gekijōban Kamen Raidā Dikeido: Ōru Raidā tai Daishokkā)

Tetsuo Kurata reprised his role as Kotaro Minami in 2009's Kamen Rider Decade The Movie: All Riders vs. Dai-Shocker.

- Super Hero Taisen GP: Kamen Rider 3 (スーパーヒーロー大戦GP 仮面ライダー3号, Supā Hīrō Taisen Guranpuri: Kamen Raidā Sangō)

Kurata also returned as Kotaro Minami in 2015's Super Hero Taisen GP: Kamen Rider 3.

=== Video games ===
- Kamen Rider Black: Taiketsu Shadow Moon (仮面ライダーBLACK 対決シャドームーン, Kamen Raidā Burakku: Taiketsu Shadō Mūn; "Kamen Rider Black: Showdown With Shadow Moon")

A side-scrolling action game released by Bandai for the Family Computer Disk System on April 15, 1988. The player takes control of Kamen Rider Black, who must defeat numerous Gorgom mutants. The player got to ride Battle Hopper in addition to controlling Black on foot.

- Kamen Rider: Seigi no Keifu (仮面ライダー 正義の系譜, Kamen Raidā Seigi no Keifu; "Kamen Rider: Genealogy of Justice")

Kamen Rider Black appears as the main character of the 1988 storyline in this 3D action game for the PlayStation 2. Black's timeline takes place in August, two months after Shadow Moon's resurgence. Lead to an old Shocker hideout believing it to be Gorgom, Kotaro is forced to fight various kaijin and Gel-Shocker soldiers, only to learn the game's true villain is after the King Stone inside of him. Eventually, Kamen Rider 1, Kamen Rider V3 and Kamen Rider Agito travel to 1988 to assist him in the game's final battle. Tetsuo Kurata returns to voice the character. Shadow Moon makes a brief cameo as a non-playable character as well.

=== Kamen Rider Black Sun ===
Kamen Rider Black Sun (仮面ライダーBLACK SUN, Kamen Raidā Burakku San) is a political drama reboot of Kamen Rider Black, broadcast as part of the Kamen Rider 50th Anniversary Project.

The reboot was announced at a press conference on April 3, 2021, with Kazuya Shiraishi heading the project as director. The series was announced to release in spring 2022, with a worldwide release being considered. The show's staff was confirmed in October 2021, with Izumi Takahashi as a screenwriter, Shinji Higuchi as a concept designer, and Kiyotaka Taguchi as special effects director. The first visual of the show was slated to be revealed the following month. The show's two leading actors were confirmed in November 2021, with Hidetoshi Nishijima as Kotaro Minami/Kamen Rider Black Sun and Tomoya Nakamura as Nobuhiko Akizuki/Kamen Rider Shadow Moon.

=== In other media ===
- Kamen Rider Black is pictured on the cover art of Powerman 5000's 1994 EP, True Force.

== Cast ==
- Tetsuo Kurata as Kotaro Minami (南 光太郎, Minami Kōtarō)
- Takahito Horiuchi as Nobuhiko Akizuki (秋月 信彦, Akizuki Nobuhiko)
- Akemi Inoue as Kyoko Akizuki (秋月 杏子, Akizuki Kyōko)
- Ayumi Taguchi as Katsumi Kida (紀田 克美, Kida Katsumi)
- Hitomi Yoshii as High Priestess Bishium (大神官ビシュム, Daishinkan Bishumu)
- Susumu Kurobe as Hideomi Kuromatsu (黒松 英臣, Kuromatsu Hideomi)
- Jun Yoshida as Kensei Bilgenia (剣聖ビルゲニア, Kensei Birugenia)

=== Voice cast ===
- Masaki Terasoma as Shadow Moon (シャドームーン, Shadō Mūn)
- Takeshi Watabe as Creation King (創世王, Sōsei Ō)
- Shōzō Iizuka as High Priest Darom (大神官ダロム, Daishinkan Daromu)
- Toshimichi Takahashi as High Priest Baraom (大神官バラオム, Daishinkan Baraomu)
- Kiyoshi Kobayashi (1–39) and Issei Masamune (40–51) as Narrator

=== Guest cast ===
- Kantarō Suga as Soichiro Akizuki
- Sent Hoshi as Masaru Todo (東堂 勝, Tōdō Masaru)
- Yutaka Hirose as Hayami
- Ryōsuke Sakamoto as Morita
- Miyuki Nagato as Gorgom Henchwoman
- Jōji Nakata as Shigeru Sugiyama
- Masaki Kyomoto as Ryusuke Taki (滝 竜介, Taki Ryūsuke)
- Kouji Unogi as Buffalo Mutant (Human Form)
- Hiroko Nishimoto as Kimie Tadokoro
- Mayumi Yoshida
- Masashi Ishibashi as Saburo Takasugi
- Shun Ueda as Kuwagata Mutant (Human Form)
- Eisuke Yoda as Kujira Mutant (クジラ怪人, Kujira Kaijin; Voice)

=== Suit cast ===
- Jiro Okamoto as Kamen Rider Black
- Tokio Iwata as Century King Shadow Moon

== Songs ==
Opening theme

- "Kamen Rider Black" (仮面ライダーBLACK, Kamen Raidā Burakku)
  - Lyrics: Yoko Aki (阿木 燿子, Aki Yōko)
  - Composition: Ryudo Uzaki (宇崎 竜童, Uzaki Ryūdō)
  - Arrangement: Eiji Kawamura (川村 栄二, Kawamura Eiji)
  - Artist: Tetsuo Kurata

Ending theme

- "Long Long Ago, 20th Century"
  - Lyrics: Yoko Aki
  - Composition: Ryudo Uzaki
  - Arrangement: Eiji Kawamura
  - Artist: Norio Sakai

== International Broadcast, Home Video and Streaming ==
- In its home country of Japan from August 1992 to August 1993, the full series was released on VHS by Toei Video and spread across 13 volumes with four episodes on each tape, with the last volume containing only three episodes. Then from December 10, 2004, to April 21, 2005, the series was released in full on DVD in five volumes. Each volume contains 2 discs (1 disc for Vol.5) and 12 episodes (11 episodes for Vol.1, 6 episodes for Vol.5). Then from December 5, 2014, to April 8, 2015, the series was released on Blu-Ray and spread in three volumes. Each release containing three discs with 17 episodes. The Official Toei Tokusatsu YouTube channel also broadcast the series online from August 1, 2011, to January 22, 2012, then December 23, 2013 to June 15, 2014, then May 6, - November 4, 2017 and June 16, 2021. The Toei Tokusatsu Nico Nico Official Channel also broadcast it online from May 6, 2012 – April 14, 2013. Re-runs of the series aired on the Toei Channel during the frames of June–December 2001, January–April 2004, February–August 2013 and February–August 2015.
- It aired in Thailand in 1990 on Saturday before noon on Channel 3, dubbed as weera burut nakak dam. ("วีรบุรุษหน้ากากดำ", lit. 'Black Masked Hero').
- In the Chinese-speaking world, Cantonese, Mandarin (Taiwan dialect) and Hmong dubs were produced and aired in Hong Kong, Taiwan and in the Hmong-speaking regions and respectively.
  - In Hong Kong, the series aired with a Cantonese Chinese dub aired from July 2, 1990, and finished on September 5, 1991. Originally, it aired from July 2 to October 1990 at first on Asia Television. At the time, it was titled: "Kamen Rider 1990." (幪面超人1990) The broadcast time was initially at 8:00pm every Monday to Friday, about half an hour, and later changed to an irregular time slot. Later on, the same channel premiered the sequel series, Kamen Rider Black RX from July 1 to August 1, 1991, and then renamed this series, Kamen Rider Black (假面騎士BLACK) for re-runs from August 2 to September 6, 1991, which was the only time this happened. After the re-run, the channel combined both shows into naming it Kamen Rider 1991. (幪面超人1991)
  - In Taiwan, the series aired from December 1996 to December 1997 as Masked Rider Black (假面超人BLACK) on the Star Chinese Channel with a Taiwanese Mandarin dub, along with its sequel series, Kamen Rider Black RX. This was the very first Kamen Rider series to air in Taiwan.
  - For the Hmong-speaking regions, A Hmong dub was produced and titled under Ntsaum Nab and was released direct to video.
- It was initially the first of the two series of the Kamen Rider franchise to be broadcast in Brazil (the other being its sequel Kamen Rider Black RX), by the now-extinct network Rede Manchete from April 22, 1991, to July 15, 1994, and was also released on home video. This series debuted on the same channel on the same day as two other Toei Tokusatsu shows being Hikari Sentai Maskman (aired as Defensores da Luz Maskman (Maskman - Defenders of Light)) and Jikuu Senshi Spielban (which was renamed Jaspion 2 after the success of Juspion (Jaspion in the dub) had there). Even with the title of Black Kamen Rider adopted by the dubbing and early TV promos, the series was announced later as Blackman, which was also used for the toy line and the Brazilian soundtrack album. It also aired reruns in 2010 on the channel Ulbra TV and also returned briefly on August 30, 2020, on the Band network. Originally, The last episode (51 - Gorgom's Last Day) was never shown, as Toei only shipped 50 out of 51 episodes for cost reasons. In 2020, that last episode was finally dubbed and was supposed to air on Band. However, after a dispute with Sato Company over the license towards dubbing rights, the series was pulled from re-runs in the following week from after only showing the first two episodes. On July 16, 2023, the final episode finally made its debut held at theater chains ran by the company, and all 51 episodes in dubbed format are now available for streaming. On November 7, 2023, a Brazilian Portuguese dub of Kamen Rider Build was confirmed to be in the making, thus making that the third series to officially be displayed with a dub in the region.
- In the Philippines, Kamen Rider Black was aired on IBC-13 from 1991 to 1998 under the title Masked Rider Black with a Tagalog dub every Sunday. It has become one of the highest-rated TV shows of that time.
- In Indonesia, this series has been dubbed in Indonesian three times. The first dub aired was broadcast as Ksatria Baja Hitam which means The Black Steel Knight and aired from 1993 to 1994 on RCTI with a cult status earned. A second dub aired from 2004 to 2006 on Indosiar as Masked Rider Black. Then the series returned in 2020 on RTV and for YouTube also under the title Masked Rider Black (which is the title used by Toei for international distribution as well) with a third dub being shown.
- In Malaysia, the series has been dubbed in Malaysian and first aired on TV1 in 1990 under Suria Perkasa Hitam and it recently previously aired on RTM TV1 in 2021.
- In the Latin American Spanish speaking regions, it is currently being streamed on Pluto TV with subtitles in the original Japanese audio.
- The series was licensed by Discotek Media for Blu-Ray in the US. It was announced during the Spooktacular” Discotek Day stream on October 25, 2022, and was released on February 28, 2023.
