= Hiroki Konno =

Japanese comedian and actor (born 1978)

- 今野 浩喜
- Born: December 12, 1978 (age 47); Niiza, Saitama, Japan
- Other names: Hiroki Sumiyoshi (住吉 浩喜, Sumiyoshi Hiroki; real name)
- Education: Seiritsu Gakuen High School; School JCA
- Occupations: Comedian, actor
- Years active: 1997–present
- Agent: Production Jinrikisha

Hiroki Konno (今野 浩喜, Konno Hiroki; born December 12, 1978 in Niiza, Saitama, Japan) is a Japanese comedian and actor who was a member of the comedy duo King of Comedy.

Konno lives in Saitama, Saitama.

== Filmography ==
=== Television ===
Year	Title	Role	Notes	Ref.
2015	Shitamachi Rocket	Shigeru Sakoda		
2016	Omukae desu	Ho	Episodes 3 and 4	
2018	Black Forceps	Fuminori Sekikawa		
2022	The Sunflower Disappeared in the Rain	Yūta Okumura	Miniseries	
2022	Kamen Rider Black Sun	Wataru Igaki		
2023	Ranman	Shōzaburō Ōkubo	Asadora	

=== Films ===
Year	Title	Role	Notes	Ref.
2022	Life in the Fast Lane			
2023	Detective of Joshidaikoji			
2024	A Conviction of Marriage	Shigeo Ide		
2025	Dollhouse			
2026	Love≠Comedy	Iwao Takami		
2026	The Village of Eight Gravestones			
2026	My Crazy Feminist Girlfriend			

=== Anime ===
Year	Title	Role	Notes	Ref.
2011	Fujirogu	Hiroko Konno, Hiroki Konno		
