= Kamen Rider Black RX =

1988 Japanese TV series or program of the Kamen Rider series

- Genre: Tokusatsu; Superhero fiction Science fiction Action/Adventure; Fantasy
- Created by: Shotaro Ishinomori
- Developed by: Takashi Edzure
- Directed by: Yoshiaki Kobayashi
- Starring: Tetsuo Kurata; Jun Koyamaki; Makoto Akatsuka; Eri Tsuruma; Rikiya Koyama; Megumi Ueno; Jo Onodera; Go Inoue; Shoko Iruma; Atsuko Takahata; Tetsuya Matsui
- Voices of: Seizō Katō; Shōzō Iizuka; Toshimichi Takahashi; Kazunori Arai; Atsuo Mori
- Narrated by: Issei Masamune
- Music by: Eiji Kawamura
- Country of origin: Japan
- No. of episodes: 47

Production
- Running time: 20–25 minutes
- Production companies: Ishimori Productions; Toei Company; Mainichi Broadcasting System

Original release
- Network: JNN (MBS, TBS)
- Release: October 23, 1988 – September 24, 1989

Related
- Kamen Rider Black; Shin Kamen Rider: Prologue; Kamen Rider ZO; Kamen Rider J; Kamen Rider Kuuga

Kamen Rider Black RX (仮面ライダーBLACK RX, Kamen Raidā Burakku Āru Ekkusu) is a Japanese tokusatsu superhero television series produced as part of the Kamen Rider series. The ninth show in the franchise, it was produced by Toei Company, and aired on the MBS, TBS and other JNN affiliates from October 23, 1988, to September 24, 1989. The series is a direct sequel to Kamen Rider Black and the first to feature a team-up with the past Riders since the 1984 TV special Birth of the 10th! Kamen Riders All Together!!. For distribution purposes, Toei refers to this television series as Black Masked Rider RX.

This was also the last installment of the Kamen Rider series to be produced in the Shōwa era and the first to be produced in the Heisei one — Episode 11 was delayed by one week following Emperor Hirohito's death.

In 1995 Black RX was adapted into the American television series Masked Rider by Saban. The show featured a heavily altered story and all-new characters, in an attempt to fit the series in as a spin-off of Power Rangers.

== Story ==
Following the Fall of Gorgom, Kotaro Minami tries to live a normal life with the Sahara family. However, this brief moment of peace is soon shattered by the arrival of the Crisis Empire-an evil alien menace that aims to eradicate humanity and claim dominion over Earth. After refusing to aid them in their nefarious goals, Kotaro is thrown hurtling back towards the planet with his transformation belt shattered. However, when he awakens, Kotaro discovers that the sun's rays have blessed him with new power-the power of Kamen Rider Black RX!

== Episodes ==
1. The Child of the Sun! RX (太陽の子だ！ＲＸ, Taiyō no Ko Da! Āru Ekkusu) (Original Airdate: October 23, 1988)
2. Bask in Light! RX (光を浴びて！ＲＸ, Hikari o Abite! Āru Ekkusu) (Original Airdate: October 30, 1988)
3. RX vs. the Knight of the Wind (ＲＸ対風の騎士, Āru Ekkusu Tai Kaze no Kishi) (Original Airdate: November 6, 1988)
4. The Car of Light, Rideron (光の車ライドロン, Hikari no Kuruma Raidoron) (Original Airdate: November 13, 1988)
5. The Cave Exploration's Falling Hole (洞窟探検の落し穴, Dōkutsu Tanken no Otoshiana) (Original Airdate: November 20, 1988)
6. The Kaima Extraterrestrials' Great Riot! (怪魔ＥＴ大暴れ！, Kaima Ī Tī Ōabare!) (Original Airdate: November 27, 1988)
7. SOS! The Circle of Friendship (ＳＯＳ！友情の輪, Esu Ō Esu! Yūjō no Wa) (Original Airdate: December 4, 1988)
8. Dad's And Mom's Secret (パパとママの秘密, Papa to Mama no Himitsu) (Original Airdate: December 11, 1988)
9. Maribaron's Witchcraft (マリバロンの妖術, Maribaron no Yōjutsu) (Original Airdate: December 18, 1988)
10. Surprised With Replicas (ニセ者でドッキリ, Nisemono de Dokkiri) (Original Airdate: December 25, 1988)
11. The Scraps' Revolt (スクラップの反乱, Sukurappu no Hanran) (Original Airdate: January 15, 1989)
12. The Assassin in Dreams (夢の中の暗殺者, Yume no Naka no Ansatsusha) (Original Airdate: January 22, 1989)
13. The Targeted Kaima Girl (狙われた怪魔少女, Nerawareta Kaima Shōjo) (Original Airdate: January 29, 1989)
14. The Kidnapped Hitomi-chan (ひとみちゃん誘拐, Hitomi-chan Yūkai) (Original Airdate: February 5, 1989)
15. Robo Rider Is Born (ロボライダー誕生, Robo Raidā Tanjō) (Original Airdate: February 12, 1989)
16. The Miraculous Valley's Princess (奇跡の谷の姫君, Kiseki no Tani no Himegimi) (Original Airdate: February 19, 1989)
17. Bio Rider! (バイオライダー！, Baio Raidā!) (Original Airdate: February 26, 1989)
18. The Mystery! Swimming in the Air of Dreams (怪！夢の空中遊泳, Kai! Yume no Kūchū Yūei) (Original Airdate: March 5, 1989)
19. The Artificial Sun of Terror! (恐怖の人工太陽！, Kyōfu no Jinkō Taiyō) (Original Airdate: March 12, 1989)
20. The Banana Eating Ogre (バナナを喰う鬼, Banana o Kū Oni) (Original Airdate: March 19, 1989)
21. The Front of Love And Friendship (愛と友情の戦線, Ai to Yūjō no Sensen) (Original Airdate: March 26, 1989)
22. Shadow Moon! (シャドームーン！, Shadō Mūn!) (Original Airdate: April 2, 1989)
23. RX Became a Pig (ブタになったＲＸ, Buta ni Natta Āru Ekkusu) (Original Airdate: April 9, 1989)
24. Dad Is Dracula (パパはドラキュラ, Papa wa Dorakyura) (Original Airdate: April 16, 1989)
25. The Bride of Scorpio (さそり座の花嫁, Sasoriza no Hanayome) (Original Airdate: April 23, 1989)
26. Bosgan's Revenge (ボスガンの反撃, Bosugan no Hangeki) (Original Airdate: April 30, 1989)
27. Huge Counterattack! The Prince of Shadows (大逆襲！影の王子, Daigyakushū! Kage no Ōji) (Original Airdate: May 7, 1989)
28. The Agent of the Majestic Emperor (皇帝陛下の代理人, Kōtei Heika no Dairinin) (Original Airdate: May 14, 1989)
29. A World Without Water (水のない世界, Mizu no Nai Sekai) (Original Airdate: May 21, 1989)
30. Tokyo Desert Without a Tomorrow (明日なき東京砂漠, Asu Naki Tōkyō Sabaku) (Original Airdate: May 28, 1989)
31. The Woman Who Saw the Kaima World (怪魔界を見た女, Kaimakai o Mita On'na) (Original Airdate: June 4, 1989)
32. The Sky of Love And Hope (愛と希望の大空, Ai to Kibō no Ōzora) (Original Airdate: June 11, 1989)
33. Decisive Battle on the Great Seto Bridge (瀬戸大橋の大決戦, Seto Ōhashi no Daikessen) (Original Airdate: June 18, 1989)
34. Making a Plan For The Shikoku Aircraft!! (四国空母化計画！！, Shikoku Kūboka Keikaku!!) (Original Airdate: June 25, 1989)
35. Kotaro Not Wanted!! (光太郎いらない!!, Kōtarō iranai!!) (Original Airdate: July 2, 1989)
36. Who's the Hero!? (ヒーローは誰だ！？, Hīrō wa Dare Da!?) (Original Airdate: July 9, 1989)
37. Skinning With Tusks, the Beastman Ninja Troop (牙むく獣人忍者隊, Kiba Muku Jūjin Ninja Tai) (Original Airdate: July 16, 1989)
38. The Wicked Dance Troop of the White Bone Field (白骨ケ原の妖舞団, Hakkotsugahara no Yōbudan) (Original Airdate: July 23, 1989)
39. A Running Explosion! Mini 4WD (爆走！ミニ４ＷＤ, Bakusō! Mini Yon Daburu Dī) (Original Airdate: July 30, 1989)
40. The Trap of the Ghostly Housing Development (ユーレイ団地の罠, Yūrei Danchi no Wana) (Original Airdate: August 6, 1989)
41. The Terror of the 100 Eyed Hag (百目婆ァの恐怖, Todome Babā no Kyōfu) (Original Airdate: August 13, 1989)
42. The 4 Commanders Are Banished (四隊長は全員追放, Yon Taichō wa Zen'in Tsuihō) (Original Airdate: August 20, 1989)
43. Defeated! RX (敗れたり！ＲＸ, Yaburetari! Āru Ekkusu) (Original Airdate: August 27, 1989)
44. Fight! All Riders (戦え！全ライダー, Tatakae! Zen Raidā) (Original Airdate: September 3, 1989)
45. The Fake Rider's Last Days (偽ライダーの末路, Nise Raidā no Matsuro) (Original Airdate: September 10, 1989)
46. The Riders' All Out Charge (ライダーの総突撃, Raidā no Sōtotsugeki) (Original Airdate: September 17, 1989)
47. A Shining Tomorrow! (輝ける明日, Kagayakeru Ashita) (Original Airdate: September 24, 1989)

=== TV special ===
- 1988: Kamen Rider 1 Through RX: Big Gathering (仮面ライダー１号～ＲＸ大集合, Kamen Raidā Ichigō~Āru Ekkusu Daishūgō) - It covers all the heroes, from Kamen Rider 1 until ZX and introduces Kamen Rider Black RX.

== Films ==
Kamen Rider: Run All Over the World (仮面ライダー 世界に駆ける, Kamen Raidā Sekai ni Kakeru) is a short 3D film originally screened in the Coal History Village in Yubari between April 29 throughout October 31, 1989. The film involves a team-up between Kotaro Minami's four Kamen Rider alter-egos (Black, RX, Robo Rider and Bio Rider) to fight against the Crisis Empire. Tetsuo Kurata plays Kotaro Minami and voices all four of his Kamen Rider alter-egos. General Jark, the four commanders of Crisis, and three high priests of Gorgom also appear in the movie, all played by their original actors with the exception of Bosgan (who is unvoiced) and Darom (who is voiced by Eisuke Yoda). The movie was written by Yoshio Urasawa and directed by series director Yoshiaki Kobayashi.

In the film, the Crisis Empire devises a plan to defeat Kotaro by reverting him back to his old form of Kamen Rider Black and sending out several revived monsters after him. However, Kamen Rider Black is assisted by another Black RX, who used a time warp to help his past self. The two are joined by Black RX's alternate forms of Robo Rider and Bio Rider, and the four Riders combine their powers to defeat the revived monsters.

The film is included as a bonus on the Region 2 DVD release of Kamen Rider Black RX Vol. 2. The DVD versions lack the original 3D effects of the theatrical release. A bonus Blu-ray 3D disc containing the movie is included in the "Kamen Rider: The Movie Blu-ray Box 1972-1988" set.

- Kamen Rider Decade: All Riders vs. Dai-Shocker (劇場版 仮面ライダーディケイド オールライダー対大ショッカー, Gekijōban Kamen Raidā Dikeido: Ōru Raidā tai Daishokkā)

Tetsuo Kurata reprised his role as Kotaro Minami in 2009's Kamen Rider Decade The Movie: All Riders vs. Dai-Shocker.

- Super Hero Taisen GP: Kamen Rider 3 (スーパーヒーロー大戦GP 仮面ライダー3号, Supā Hīrō Taisen Guranpuri: Kamen Raidā Sangō)

Kurata also returned as Kotaro Minami in 2015's Super Hero Taisen GP: Kamen Rider 3.

== After 0 ==
The S.I.C. Hero Saga story for Black RX ran in Monthly Hobby Japan in the December 2002 through March 2003 issues. Titled Kamen Rider Black RX: After 0 (MASKED RIDER BLACK RX -After 0-, Kamen Raidā Burakku Āru Ekkusu: Afutā Zero), it tells the story of what happened after the finale of Black RX. It features the original characters the White RX (Another RX) (白いRX（アナザーRX）, Shiroi Āru Ekkusu (Anazā Āru Ekkusu)), Shadow Moon with RX powers, and the Creation King (Another Shadow Moon) (創生王（アナザーシャドームーン）, Sōseiō (Anazā Shadō Mūn)), the result of Shadow Moon absorbing both King Stones.

Chapter titles

1. Ceremonial Day (式日, Shikijitsu)
2. Dazzling (眩惑, Genwaku)
3. Earth's Demise (終焉の地, Shūen no Chi)
4. King of Dreams (夢幻の王, Mugen no Ō)

== Cast ==
- Tetsuo Kurata as Kotaro Minami (南 光太郎, Minami Kōtarō)
- Makoto Sumikawa as Reiko Shiratori (白鳥 玲子, Shiratori Reiko)
- Makoto Akatsuka as Shunkichi Sahara (佐原 俊吉, Sahara Shunkichi)
- Eri Tsuruma as Utako Sahara (佐原 唄子, Sahara Utako)
- Rikiya Koyama as Joe of Haze (霞のジョー, Kasumi no Jō)
- Megumi Ueno as Kyoko Matoba (的場 響子, Matoba Kyōko)
- Joe Onodera as Goro (吾郎, Gorō)
- Go Inoue as Shigeru Sahara (佐原 茂, Sahara Shigeru)
- Shoko Imura as Hitomi Sahara (佐原 ひとみ, Sahara Hitomi)
- Maho Maruyama as Princess Garonia (Teenager Hitomi)
- Minoru Sawatari as Hayato Hayami (速水 隼人, Hayami Hayato)
- Seizō Katō (1–44) and Hidekatsu Shibata (45–46) as General Jark (ジャーク将軍, Jāku Shōgun)
- Atsuko Takahata as Maribaron (マリバロン, Maribaron)
- Tetsuya Matsui as Dasmader (ダスマダー, Dasumadā)

=== Voice cast ===
- Goro Naya as Grand Lord Crisis (クライシス皇帝, Kuraishisu Kōtei)
- Shōzō Iizuka as Bosgan (ボスガン, Bosugan)
- Toshimichi Takahashi as Gatezone (ガテゾーン, Gatezōn)
- Kazunori Arai as Gedorian (ゲドリアン, Gedorian)
- Atsuo Mori as Chakram (チャックラム, Chakkuramu)
- Masaki Terasoma as Shadow Moon (シャドームーン, Shadō Mūn)
- Teiji Ōmiya as King Stone (キングストーン, Kingu Sutōn)
- Issei Masamune as Narrator

== Songs ==
Opening theme

- "Kamen Rider Black RX" (仮面ライダーBLACK RX, Kamen Raidā Burakku Āru Ekkusu)
  - Lyrics: Kang Jin-hwa
  - Composition & Arrangement: Eiji Kawamura
  - Artist: Takayuki Miyauchi

Ending theme

- "Dareka ga Kimi o Aishiteru" (誰かが君を愛してる; "Someone Loves You")
  - Lyrics: Kang Jin-hwa
  - Composition: Tetsuji Hayashi
  - Arrangement: Eiji Kawamura
  - Artist: Takayuki Miyauchi

== International Broadcast, Home Video and Streaming ==
- In its home country of Japan from August 1993 to September 1994, the full series was released on VHS by Toei Video and spread across 12 volumes with four episodes on each tape, with the last volume containing only three episodes. Six volumes of the series were released on Laserdisc from March 21, 1999, to January 21, 2000, with all episodes. Then from May 21 to August 5, 2005, a total of 4 volumes were released with each holding two discs with 12 episodes, the last volume holding only 11. Then from June 10 to October 7, 2015, the full series was released on Blu-Ray in three volumes, with each one containing 3 discs and 16 episodes (15 for Volume 3). The Official Toei Tokusatsu YouTube channel also broadcast the series online from January 23 to July 1, 2012, then from June 16 to November 29, 2014, November 4, 2017, to April 21, 2018, and December 15, 2021, to May 25, 2022. The Toei Tokusatsu Nico Nico Official Channel also broadcast it online from April 21, 2013, to March 9, 2014.
- It aired in Thailand on Channel 3, dubbed as weera burut nakak dam. ("วีรบุรุษหน้ากากดำ", literally: Black Mask Hero) and this along with the previous series was also released on VCD by Dream Vision and later again by TIGA Company under Rāchạny̒phlạng s̄uriyạnn ("ราชันย์พลังสุริยัน", literally: Sun Power King).
- In the Chinese-speaking world, Cantonese, Mandarin, and Hmong dubs were produced and aired in Hong Kong, Taiwan, and Hmong-speaking regions respectively.
  - In Hong Kong, the series aired with a Cantonese Chinese dub aired from July 1, 1991, and finished by around 1992. Originally, it aired from July 1 to August 1991 at first on Asia Television. Then that same channel re-broadcast the previous series, Kamen Rider Black at that time, from August 2 to September 6, 1991, and the two dramas were collectively called "Kamen Rider 1991" (幪面超人1991). The first rebroadcast was from June 14, 1992, to January 10, 1993. The name was changed to "Kamen Rider RX" (幪面超人RX), and the broadcast time was every Saturday night or every Sunday night. The finale was broadcast on the evening of January 10, 1993, on a Sunday. The last episode gave the series' title a renamed "Kamen Rider RX Final Battle" (幪面超人RX終極之戰). Due to the high ratings at that time, many rebroadcasts were scheduled until March 31, 2002. The program name was still "Kamen Rider RX" and the broadcast time was every Sunday morning at 7:00. Therefore, the program was broadcast a total of 5 times, overall, with four re-runs throughout 11 years. On the contrary, because the ratings of the previous series Kamen Rider BLACK in Hong Kong were lower than that of this one, Asia Television Hong Kong has not arranged to rebroadcast the original series again. However, when Kamen Rider Decade was first broadcast on the TVB Jade Channel, it was translated as Kamen Rider BLACK RX (幪面超人BLACK RX) directly translated from the original Japanese.
  - In Taiwan, the series aired from December 1997 to November 1998 as Masked Rider RX (假面超人RX) on the Star Chinese Channel with a Taiwanese Mandarin dub, alongside its previous series that came before.
  - For the Hmong-speaking regions, A Hmong dub was produced and titled under Hnub Leej Tub Black RX and was released direct to video.
- In Malaysia, the series received a Malay dub and aired from 1996-1997 on TV2. Nippon Vision also licensed and released a Malay dub of the series on VHS and VCD in addition. It also was released with an English dub on VCD by Speedy Video as simply Masked Rider Black RX.
- Spain has aired a Castilian Spanish dub of the series on Antena 3.
- In Indonesia, the series aired on RCTI as Ksatria Baja Hitam RX (Black Metal Knights RX) with an Indonesian dub on August 14, 1993. They also aired the Saban adaptation Masked Rider on Indosiar in 1997, as a separate series.
- It was initially the second of the two series of the Kamen Rider franchise to be broadcast in Brazil (the other being the previous series which was Kamen Rider Black) with a Brazilian Portuguese dub, by the now-extinct network Rede Manchete debuting on the network on July 24, 1995, airing as Black Kamen Rider RX in the region. Like the previous series, the last episode (Episode 47 - A Shining Tomorrow!) did not air initially. However, the episode was still dubbed and was eventually shown on TV Diário in the state of Ceará when the series was rebroadcast. However, it was only shown once. InterMovies Action released the series on home video as well. On November 7, 2023, a Brazilian Portuguese dub of Kamen Rider Build was confirmed to be in the making.
  - As of 2024, this is the only entry in the Kamen Rider series to have dubbed versions of both itself and its American adaptation Masked Rider as two separate shows in Brazil.
- The series was licensed by Discotek Media for Blu-Ray in the US and released on August 29, 2023.
