= Kamen Rider Black Sun =

Japanese superhero series

- Title card
- Genre: Tokusatsu; Superhero fiction Science fiction Dark fantasy Conspiracy; Alternate history Political drama
- Based on: Kamen Rider Black by Shotaro Ishinomori
- Written by: Izumi Takahashi
- Directed by: Kazuya Shiraishi
- Starring: Hidetoshi Nishijima; Tomoya Nakamura; Kokoro Hirasawa; Kengo Kimura; Nakamura Baijaku II; Yō Yoshida; Pretty Ohta; Takahiro Miura; Takuma Otoo; Gaku Hamada; Daisuke Kuroda; Lou Ohshiba; Toshinori Omi; Hiroki Konno; Jua; Haruka Imou; Mochtar
- Composer: Kenta Matsukuma
- Country of origin: Japan
- No. of episodes: 10

Production
- Production companies: Toei Company, Ltd.; Kamen Rider Black Sun Project

Original release
- Network: Amazon Prime Video
- Release: October 28, 2022

Kamen Rider Black Sun (仮面ライダーBLACK SUN, Kamen Raidā Burakku San) is a Japanese tokusatsu web political drama reboot of the 1987 television series Kamen Rider Black. Produced by Toei Company, the series is directed by Kazuya Shiraishi and was released worldwide through Amazon Prime Video on October 28, 2022. The series is part of the celebrations of the 50th anniversary of the Kamen Rider Series, also celebrating the 35th anniversary of Kamen Rider Black.

It received a 16+/18+ rating from Amazon Prime Video.

== Plot ==
In 2022, Japan is divided by tensions between humans and kaijin, people transformed through government-sponsored experiments who continue to face widespread discrimination. Aoi Izumi, a young activist campaigning for kaijin rights, encounters Kotaro Minami, a reclusive kaijin known as Black Sun. Initially hired to assassinate her, Kotaro instead protects Aoi after discovering that her necklace contains a Kingstone, one of two objects needed to determine the successor to the dying Creation King.

Flashbacks to 1972 reveal that Kotaro and his childhood friend Nobuhiko Akizuki, both implanted with Kingstones as children, participated in Gorgom, a movement advocating equal rights for kaijin. Alongside fellow activist Yukari Shinjo, they opposed a government agreement that would grant kaijin limited rights while placing them under government control. The agreement divides Gorgom, with one faction eventually establishing the Gorgom Party. Yukari plans to destroy the Creation King but is killed by Bilgenia, another member of the movement. Nobuhiko is subsequently imprisoned, while Kotaro withdraws from the conflict.

In the present, Prime Minister Shinichi Dounami maintains ties with the Gorgom Party and profits from the exploitation of kaijin. The party seeks the Kingstones to produce a successor to the Creation King, whose body supplies substances used to create and sustain kaijin. Meanwhile, Nobuhiko escapes captivity and establishes a resistance movement against Gorgom. Although he initially seeks equality between humans and kaijin, his experiences increasingly lead him to advocate kaijin supremacy.

Aoi is captured by Gorgom and forcibly transformed into a mantis kaijin. Kotaro joins Nobuhiko in an assault on the organization's headquarters to rescue her. During the attack, Kotaro confronts the Creation King and removes its heart, but the creature remains alive. Aoi escapes alongside her childhood friend Shunsuke Komatsu, who is subsequently beaten to death by an anti-kaijin group. His death further intensifies Nobuhiko's hostility toward humanity. Nobuhiko transforms into Shadow Moon and seizes control of Gorgom, intending to establish a society ruled by kaijin.

After recovering from injuries sustained in his confrontations with the Creation King and Nobuhiko, Kotaro prepares to stop his former friend. Meanwhile, Aoi obtains evidence of the government's involvement in the experiments that created kaijin and publicly reveals the findings in a speech to the United Nations.

Kotaro confronts Nobuhiko in a final battle and defeats him. Before dying, Nobuhiko entrusts his Kingstone to Kotaro, who uses both stones to destroy the original Creation King's surviving heart. However, their combined power transforms Kotaro into the new Creation King. Retaining enough of his consciousness to recognize Aoi, he asks her to kill him. She reluctantly complies, using the Satan Saber to end his life.

Despite the exposure of the government's activities and a change in political leadership, discrimination against kaijin continues. Aoi subsequently organizes a new resistance movement, training young activists to fight against their persecution.

== Production ==
In 2019, director Kazuya Shiraishi was approached about plans for an adult-oriented Kamen Rider production. While completing work on his 2019 film One Night, Shiraishi met producer Taisuke Furuya of ADK, who mentioned the proposed project. Shiraishi expressed interest, and approximately one to two months later, Furuya arranged a meeting at Toei's headquarters, where producer Shinichiro Shirakura offered Shiraishi the opportunity to direct a reboot of Kamen Rider Black. The reboot was subsequently announced as part of the Kamen Rider franchise's 50th-anniversary projects.

Because Shiraishi had limited experience in tokusatsu productions, Shirakura sought an experienced collaborator to assist with the series' visual concepts and fictional setting. Shiraishi recommended Shinji Higuchi, whom he had previously met at the Japonismes 2018 cultural festival in Paris. Higuchi initially assumed that he would not be involved in a Kamen Rider production after learning that his longtime collaborator Hideaki Anno was developing Shin Kamen Rider. However, he accepted the opportunity to work on Black Sun after learning of Shiraishi's involvement. Higuchi subsequently invited Kiyotaka Taguchi to serve as special effects director, and Taguchi accepted.

In preparation for the production, Shiraishi rewatched the original Kamen Rider Black television series. He identified its underlying sadness and the relationship between Kotaro Minami and Nobuhiko Akizuki as elements he wanted to emphasize in the reboot. Shiraishi also sought to incorporate contemporary social issues into the narrative. Although the project was conceived for an adult audience, he expressed a desire to create a series that children could also enjoy.

=== Announcement and marketing ===
The project was announced at a press conference on April 3, 2021, the 50th anniversary of Kamen Rider's first broadcast. Shiraishi was confirmed as director during the conference, stating "the thought of being in charge of this amazing reboot of Kamen Rider Black gives me the shivers." The logo, designed by calligrapher Souun Takeda, was also unveiled. The series was given a release date of Spring 2022, with Toei "considering" a simultaneous worldwide release.

Higuchi and Taguchi's involvement was confirmed on October 4, 2021, with the pair and Shiraishi appearing in a special interview on the program's website. A crowdfunding campaign was also announced, with rewards including a limited re-issue of the original Kamen Rider Black transformation belt toy and the chance to appear on the show as an extra.

A press conference was announced on October 4 and held on November 20, posted on Toei's YouTube channel. The casting of leads Hidetoshi Nishijima as Kohtaro Minami / Kamen Rider Black Sun and Tomoya Nakamura as Nobuhiko Akizuki / Kamen Rider Shadow Moon was revealed.

At a Tamashii Nations event on November 21, Toei released the first concept images of the titular character as well as teasing upcoming toys for the series. A redesigned version of Kamen Rider Black's bike, the Battle Hopper, was also unveiled, later being put on display at the 2021 Yokohama Hot Rod Show on December 5 to further promote the series.

On March 19, 2022, it was announced that filming had wrapped and a new release date of Fall 2022 was given. The official website also revealed the first photographs of Kamen Rider Black Sun and Kamen Rider Shadow Moon, as well as their respective motorcycles, Battle Hopper and Road Sector.

The first teaser trailer and posters were revealed on June 12, 2022, along with the announcement that the series would premiere through Amazon Prime Video. The same day, the official website was updated with additional staff information. A Bandai Spirits livestream on June 16 unveiled the SH Figuarts figure of the title character and an extended version of the teaser.

== Cast ==
- Kotaro Minami (南 光太郎, Minami Kōtarō): Hidetoshi Nishijima (西島 秀俊, Nishijima Hidetoshi)
- Nobuhiko Akizuki (秋月 信彦, Akizuki Nobuhiko): Tomoya Nakamura (中村 倫也, Nakamura Tomoya)
- Young Kotaro Minami: Aoi Nakamura (中村 蒼, Nakamura Aoi)
- Aoi Izumi (和泉 葵, Izumi Aoi): Kokoro Hirasawa (平澤 宏々路, Hirasawa Kokoro)
- Shunsuke Komatsu (小松 俊介, Komatsu Shunsuke): Kengo Kimura (木村 舷碁, Kimura Kengo)
- Darom (ダロム, Daromu): Nakamura Baijaku II (中村 梅雀)
- Young Darom: Nao Okabe (岡部 尚, Okabe Nao)
- Bishium (ビシュム, Bishumu): Yō Yoshida (吉田 羊, Yoshida Yō)
- Young Bishium: Mana Sakurai (櫻井 麻七, Sakurai Mana)
- Baraom (バラオム, Baraomu): Pretty Ohta (プリティ 太田, Puriti Ōta)
- Bilgenia (ビルゲニア, Birugenia): Takahiro Miura (三浦 貴大, Miura Takahiro)
- Bat Kaijin (コウモリ怪人, Kōmori Kaijin): Takuma Otoo (音尾 琢真, Otoo Takuma)
- Whale Kaijin (クジラ怪人, Kujira Kaijin): Gaku Hamada (濱田 岳, Hamada Gaku)
- Flea Kaijin (ノミ怪人, Nomi Kaijin): Daisuke Kuroda (黒田 大輔, Kuroda Daisuke)
- Anemone Kaijin (アネモネ怪人): Miwako Kakei (筧 美和子, Kakei Miwako)
- Spider Kaijin (クモ怪人, Kumo Kaijin): Issei Okihara (沖原 一生, Okihara Issei)
- Shinichi Donami (堂波 真一, Dōnami Shin'ichi): Lou Ohshiba (ルー 大柴, Rū Ōshiba)
- Young Shinichi Donami: Oshiro Maeda (前田 旺志郎, Maeda Ōshirō)
- Isao Nimura (仁村 勲, Nimura Isao): Toshinori Omi (尾美 としのり, Omi Toshinori)
- Secretary-General: Minori Terada (寺田 農, Terada Minori)
- Wataru Igaki (井垣 渉, Igaki Wataru): Hiroki Konno (今野 浩喜, Kon'no Hiroki)
- Kazuya Kurokawa (黒川 一也, Kurokawa Kazuya): Junichi Kawanami (川並 淳一, Kawanami Jun'ichi)
- Nick (ニック, Nikku): Jua (ジュア)
- Hideo Kawamoto (川本 英夫, Kawamoto Hideo): Hiroshi Yamamoto (山本 浩司, Yamamoto Hiroshi)
- Rino Kawamoto (川本 莉乃, Kawamoto Rino): Chika Uchida (内田 慈, Uchida Chika)
- Misaki Izumi (和泉 美咲, Izumi Misaki): Fusako Urabe (占部 房子, Urabe Fusako)
- Sachi Komatsu (小松 佐, Komatsu Sachi): Akie Namiki (並木 愛枝, Namiki Akie)
- Shigeo Komatsu (小松 茂雄, Komatsu Shigeo): Takamitsu Nonaka (野中 隆光, Nonaka Takamitsu)
- Yukari Shinjo (新城 ゆかり, Shinjō Yukari): Haruka Imou (芋生 悠, Imō Haruka)
- Oliver Johnson (オリバー・ジョンソン, Oribā Jonson): Mochtar (モクタール, Mokutāru)
- 11-year-old Kotaro Minami: Ryusei Iwata (岩田 琉聖, Iwata Ryūsei)
- 11-year-old Nobuhiko Akizuki: Kanaru Suzuki (鈴木 奏晴, Suzuki Kanaru)
- Kozo Minami (南 光三, Minami Kōzō): Kou Maehara (前原 滉, Maehara Kō)
- Soichiro Akizuki (秋月 総一郎, Akizuki Sōichirō): Shusaku Kamikawa (上川 周作, Kamikawa Shūsaku)

== Theme song ==
- "Did you see the sunrise?"
  - Lyrics & Composition: Kenta Matsukuma (松隈 ケンタ, Matsukuma Kenta)
  - Arrangement: Scrambles
  - Artist: Chogakusei (超学生, Chōgakusei)
