= Tetsuo Kurata =

Japanese actor, singer and model

Tetsuo Kakimoto
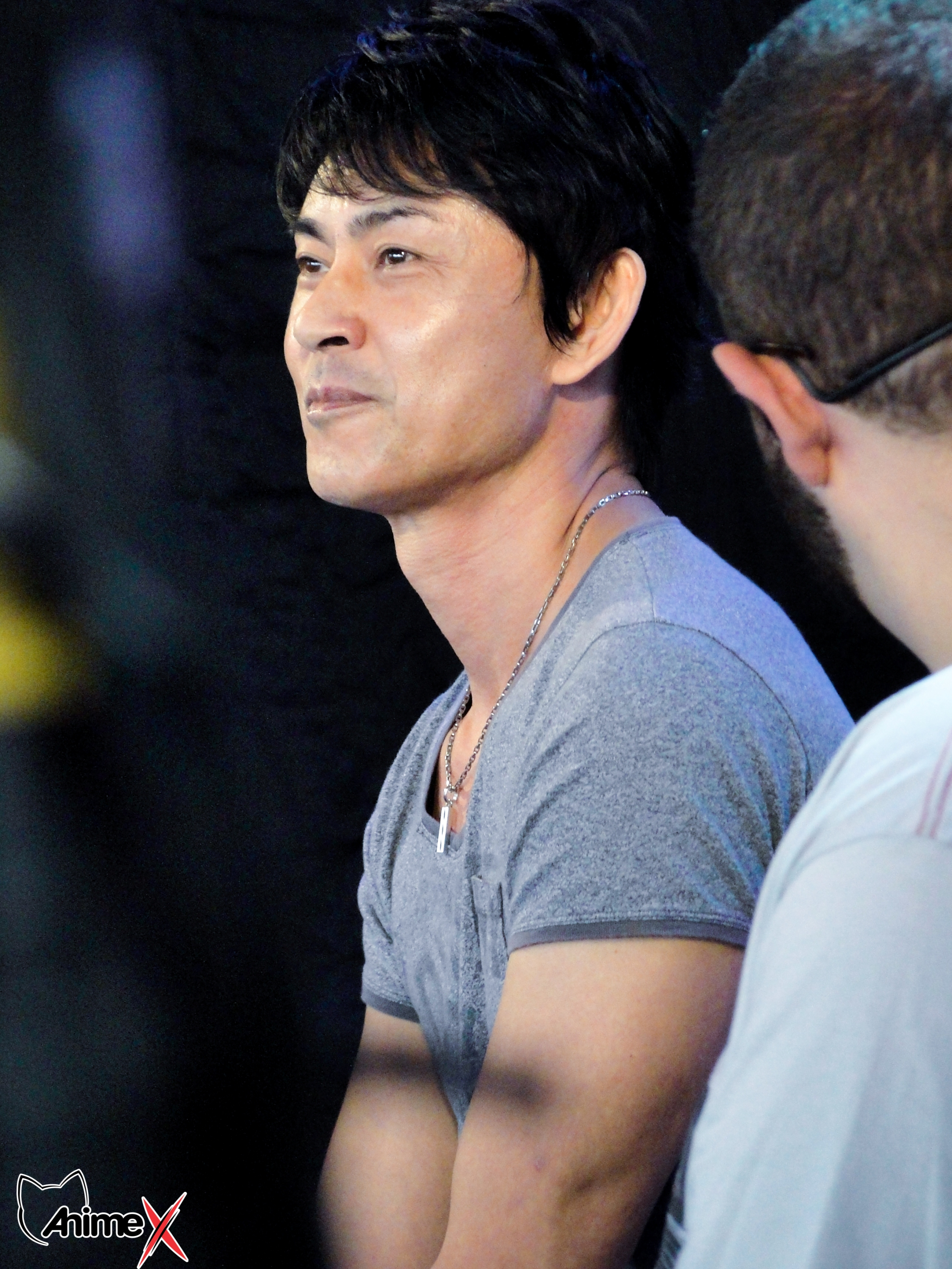
- Tetsuo Kurata at Anime Friends (2015)
- Born: Tetsuo Kakimoto; September 11, 1968 (age 57); Kōtō-ku, Tokyo, Japan
- Occupations: Actor, vocalist, model
- Years active: 1987–present
- Children: 2 (Kotaro Kakimoto / Yutaro Kakimoto)

Tetsuo Kakimoto (柿本 哲夫, Kakimoto Tetsuo; born September 11, 1968), known professionally as Tetsuo Kurata (倉田 てつを, Kurata Tetsuo), is a Japanese television, stage film actor singer restaurateur and model. He is best known for portraying Kotaro Minami, the main character in the tokusatsu television series Kamen Rider Black and its sequel, Kamen Rider Black RX. At the age of 19, Kurata made his acting debut in Black, and has since appeared in many other television series and Japanese doramas. He was Playgirl Magazine's Man of the Year for its September 1988 issue. His centerfold was photographed by Naoko Yamaguchi.

== Biography ==
Kurata auditioned for the role of Kotaro Minami in January 1987, when he had just graduated from high school. In a 2006 interview, Kurata had stated that, during the audition, he had not been able to portray the character appropriately, and did not think he would get the role. To his surprise, he was chosen by Shōtarō Ishinomori himself to play the lead role, beating some 8,000 other contestants. During this period, Kurata underwent intense training that included stage combat techniques, physical exercise sessions and acting and singing lessons.

On October 4, 1987, Kamen Rider Black premiered on TBS to public and critical acclaim. The success of the series, which ran for 51 episodes, generated enough interest from Toei Company executives to persuade them to produce a sequel, something unprecedented in the Kamen Rider Series franchise. After finishing his work on Black, Kurata was approached by Toei and renewed his contract for one more year in exchange for a salary raise to work on Black's sequel, Kamen Rider Black RX. This second series was less successful than its predecessor due to its witty and comical style, which differed deeply from the shadowy, darker tone of the original. In a 1989 magazine interview, Kurata said that although he preferred Black over Black RX (labeling the humor in the latter as "excessive"), he was glad the character enjoyed a positive and happy turn of events after Black's sad ending. However, it is rumored that Kurata declined later invitations to reprise the role in fear of being typecast, as his stigma as a Kamen Rider was almost as strong as Hiroshi Fujioka's Takeshi Hongo in the first series, but such rumors remain unconfirmed. In 2009, Kurata returned as Kotaro Minami in the movie Decade: All Riders vs. Dai-Shocker and also made a guest appearance in Kamen Rider Decade. He further reprised his role in 2015 for Super Hero Taisen GP.

Following the end of Black RX, Kurata has appeared in various television series and dramas as supporting characters. He has apparently been out of the public spotlight after taking a hiatus from the entertainment industry, but came back to voice Kotaro Minami/Kamen Rider Black in Kamen Rider: Seigi No Keifu, as well as appearing in Battle of the Cooking Iron (Ore Gohan), pitting himself against Takayuki Tsubaki, known for his role as the title character of Kamen Rider Blade. As model As Man of the Month for Playgirl magazine, he was photographed wearing only jeans by Naoko Yamaguchi.

== TV shows and Movies appearances ==
- Kamen Rider Black (1987–1988) – Kotaro Minami/Kamen Rider Black
- Kamen Rider Black RX (1988–1989) – Kotaro Minami/Kamen Rider Black RX
- Ranpo Edogawa: The Dark Light (1990)
- Kimi no Na Wa (1991)
- Men Who Fight (1992) – Syoji Matsuoka
- Abare Hasshū Goyō Tabi (1992)
- Wataru Seken wa oni Bakari (Season 3~) (1996~) – Akiba Kazuo
- Kamen Rider: Seigi no Keifu (2003) – Kotaro Minami/Kamen Rider Black
- Nogaremono Orin (2007) – Tokugawa Munetake
- Kamen Rider Decade (2009) – Kotaro Minami(RX)/Kamen Rider Black RX, Kotaro Minami(Black)/Kamen Rider Black
- Kamen Rider Decade: All Riders vs. Dai-Shocker (2009) – Kotaro Minami/Kamen Rider Black RX (cameo)
- Super Hero Taisen GP: Kamen Rider 3 (2015) – Kotaro Minami/Kamen Rider Black/Kamen Rider Black RX
- Satria Garuda BIMA-X (2015) – Ko/Satria Naga (Episodes 40 & 41)
- Kamen Rider: Battride War (2016) – Kotaro Minami/Kamen Rider Black/Kamen Rider Black RX
- Kamen Rider: Climax (2017–2018) – Kotaro Minami/Kamen Rider Black

== Tokusatsu Songs ==
(1987) Kamen Rider Black

- Kamen Rider Black Opening Theme
- Ore no Seishun Insert Theme/ closing Theme Only Spain Dub. 1st Movie Closing Theme

(1988) Kamen Rider Black RX

- Kuroi Yuusha Insert Theme
