= Jule Styne =

British-American songwriter (1905–1994)

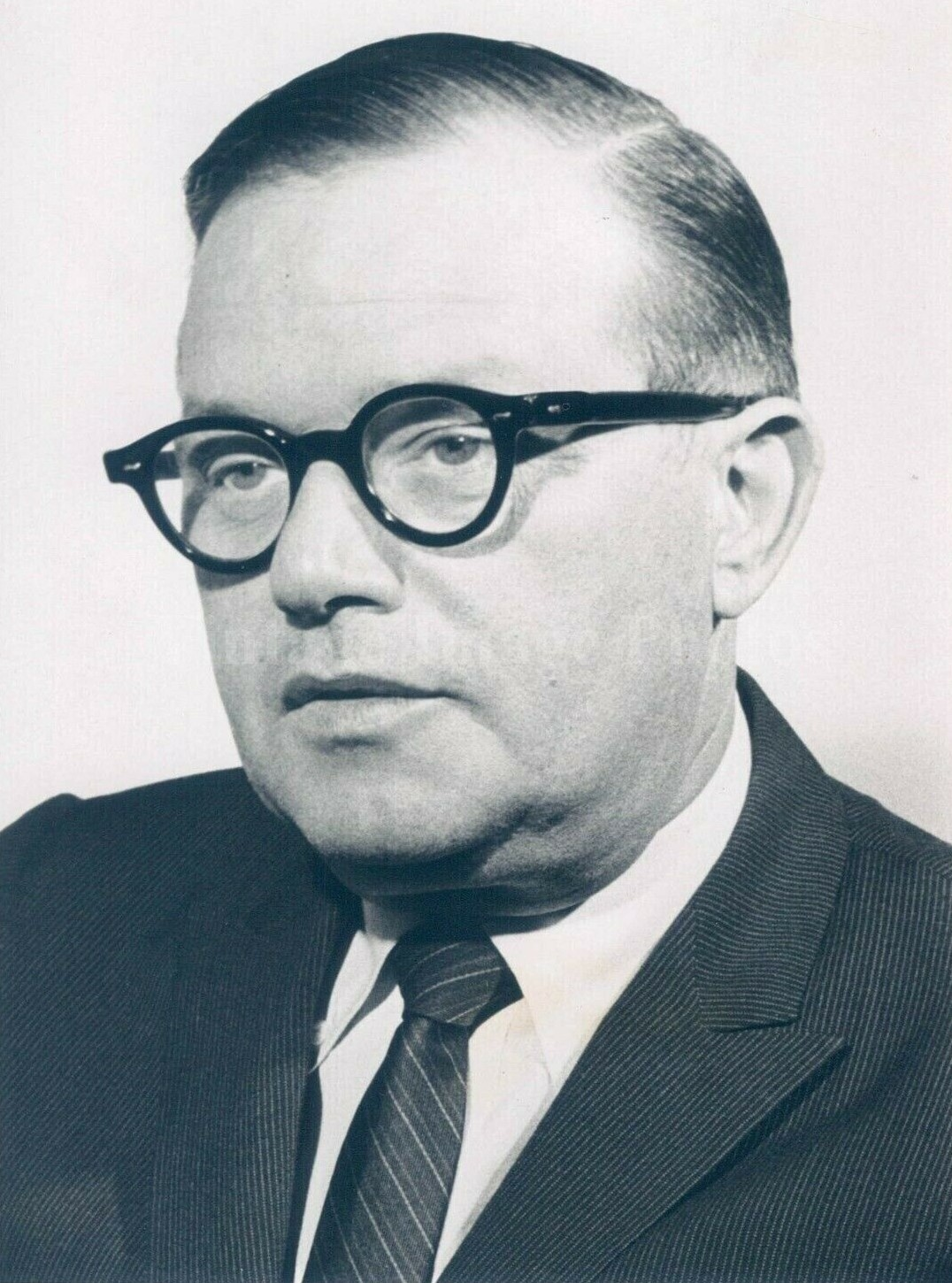
- Styne in 1961

Background information
- Born: Julius Kerwin Stein; December 31, 1905; London, England
- Died: September 20, 1994 (aged 88) Manhattan, New York City, U.S.
- Occupations: Song writer, composer
- Years active: 1926–1994
- Spouse(s): Ethel Styne; Margaret Styne

Jule Styne (/ˈdʒuːli/ JOO-lee; born Julius Kerwin Stein; December 31, 1905 – September 20, 1994) was a British-American songwriter and composer widely known for a series of Broadway musicals, including several famous frequently-revived shows that also became successful films: Gypsy, Gentlemen Prefer Blondes, and Funny Girl.

== Early life ==
Styne was born in Bethnal Green, London, England, on December 31, 1905. His parents, Anna Kertman and Isadore Stein, were Jewish emigrants from Ukraine (then part of the Russian Empire) who operated a butter and egg shop in London. Even before his family left Britain, the young Styne performed vocal impressions on London stages of well-known music hall entertainers, including legendary Scottish singer Sir Harry Lauder, who reportedly watched him perform and advised him to pursue formal piano studies. At the age of eight, he immigrated with his family to Chicago, Illinois, where he began intensive piano training at the Chicago Musical College. He quickly proved to be a musical prodigy, performing as a featured soloist with the Chicago, Detroit, and St. Louis symphony orchestras before turning ten years of age. When his parents insisted he pursue a career as a classical concert pianist, Styne rebelled in his teens, drawn instead to popular jazz rhythms, ragtime, and speakeasy dance bands—a path that led him to legally alter the spelling of his surname to "Styne" in 1932 to avoid confusion with MCA talent agency founder Doctor Jules Stein.

== Career ==
Before Styne attended Chicago Musical College, he had already attracted the attention of another teenager, Mike Todd, later a successful film producer, who commissioned him to write a song for a musical act that he was creating. It was the first of over 1,500 published songs Styne composed in his career. His first hit, "Sunday", was written in 1926.

In 1929, Styne was playing with the Ben Pollack band. Styne was a vocal coach for 20th Century Fox, until Darryl F. Zanuck fired him because vocal coaching was "a luxury, and we're cutting out those luxuries." Zanuck told him he should write songs because "that's forever". Styne established his own dance band, which got him noticed in Hollywood, where he was championed by Frank Sinatra and began a collaboration with lyricist Sammy Cahn. He and Cahn wrote many songs for the movies, including "It's Been a Long, Long Time" (No. 1 for three weeks for Harry James and His Orchestra in 1945), "Five Minutes More", and the Oscar-winning title song for Three Coins in the Fountain (1954). Ten of his songs were Oscar-nominated, many of them written with Cahn, including "I've Heard That Song Before" (No. 1 for 13 weeks for Harry James and His Orchestra in 1943), "I'll Walk Alone", "It's Magic" (a No. 2 hit for Doris Day in 1948), and "I Fall In Love Too Easily". He collaborated with Leo Robin on the score for the 1955 musical film My Sister Eileen.

In 1947, Styne wrote his first score for a Broadway musical, High Button Shoes, with Cahn, and over the next several decades wrote the scores for many Broadway shows, most notably Gentlemen Prefer Blondes, Peter Pan (additional music), Bells Are Ringing, Gypsy, Do Re Mi, Funny Girl, Lorelei, Sugar (with a story based on the movie Some Like It Hot, but all new music), and the Tony-winning Hallelujah, Baby!.

Styne wrote original music for the short-lived themed amusement park Freedomland U.S.A. that opened on June 19, 1960.

His collaborators included Sammy Cahn, Leo Robin, Betty Comden and Adolph Green, Stephen Sondheim, Bob Hilliard, and Bob Merrill. He wrote career-altering Broadway scores for a wide variety of major stars, including Phil Silvers, Carol Channing, Mary Martin, Judy Holliday, Ethel Merman, and an up-and-coming Barbra Streisand.

== Personal life and death ==
Styne was married to Ethel Pauline Rubenstein from 1927 until their divorce in 1952; they had two sons, Stanley and Norton. Outside of the theater, he struggled with a lifelong compulsive gambling habit on horse races and craps, which often wiped out his royalties and drove intense periods of songwriting to clear his debts. In June 1962, Styne married his second wife, British model Margaret Ann Bissett Brown ("Maggi", born in Torquay, Devon), with whom he had two children, Nicholas and Katherine (Chloë); the couple remained married until his death.

Styne died of heart failure November 20, 1994,six weeks after open-heart surgery at Mount Sinai Hospital in Manhattan. He was 88. On the evening after his passing, Broadway theaters dimmed their marquee lights in his honor. He was buried at Mount Ararat Cemetery in Farmingdale, New York.

In February 1995, an all-star ASCAP memorial tribute was held in Manhattan featuring eulogies and performances by longtime collaborators, including Stephen Sondheim, Betty Comden, and Adolph Green. His archive—including original handwritten scores, letters, and production materials—is housed at the Harry Ransom Center at the University of Texas at Austin.

== Awards ==
Styne was elected to the Songwriters Hall of Fame in 1972 and the American Theatre Hall of Fame in 1981, and he was a recipient of a Drama Desk Special Award and the Kennedy Center Honors in 1990. Additionally, Styne won the 1955 Oscar for Best Music, Original Song for "Three Coins in the Fountain", and "Hallelujah, Baby!" won the 1968 Tony Award for Best Original Score.

== Songs ==
A selection of the many songs that Styne wrote:

- "The Christmas Waltz"
- "Conchita Marquita Lolita Pepita Rosita Juanita Lopez"
- "Don't Rain on My Parade" (from Funny Girl)
- "Diamonds Are a Girl's Best Friend" (from Gentlemen Prefer Blondes)
- "Everything's Coming Up Roses" (from Gypsy)
- "Every Street's a Boulevard in Old New York" (from Hazel Flagg)
- "Fiddle Dee Dee"
- "Guess I'll Hang My Tears Out to Dry"
- "How Do You Speak to an Angel"
- "I Don't Want to Walk Without You"
- "I Fall in Love Too Easily" (from Anchors Aweigh)
- "I Still Get Jealous" (High Button Shoes)
- "I'll Walk Alone"
- "It's Been a Long, Long Time"
- "It's Magic" (from Romance on the High Seas)
- "It's You or No One"
- "I've Heard That Song Before"
- "Just in Time" (from Bells Are Ringing)
- "Let Me Entertain You" (from Gypsy)
- "Let It Snow! Let It Snow! Let It Snow!"
- "Long Before I Knew You"
- "Make Someone Happy" (from Do Re Mi)
- "Money Burns a Hole in My Pocket" (from Living It Up)
- "Neverland"
- "Papa, Won’t You Dance with Me?"
- "The Party's Over" (from Bells Are Ringing)
- "People" (from Funny Girl)
- "Pico and Sepulveda"
- "Saturday Night (Is the Loneliest Night of the Week)" sung by Frank Sinatra
- "Small World", from Gypsy, which became a moderate hit when sung by Johnny Mathis in 1959
- "Sunday" with Ned Miller
- "The Things We Did Last Summer"
- "Time After Time" (from It Happened in Brooklyn)
- "Three Coins in the Fountain", Oscar-winning song from the film of the same name
- "Together (Wherever We Go)" (from Gypsy)
- "Winter Was Warm" (from Mr. Magoo's Christmas Carol)

=== Credits ===
- Ice Capades of 1943 (1942) – Styne contributed one song
- Glad to See You! (1944) – closed in Philadelphia, Pennsylvania, during tryout
- High Button Shoes (1947)
- Gentlemen Prefer Blondes (1949)
- Michael Todd's Peep Show (1950) – Styne contributed 2 numbers
- Two on the Aisle (1951)
- Hazel Flagg (1953)
- Peter Pan (1954) -additional music by Styne
- My Sister Eileen (1955)
- Bells Are Ringing (1956)
- Say, Darling (1958)
- A Party with Betty Comden and Adolph Green (1958)
- First Impressions (1959) -Produced by Styne
- Gypsy (1959)
- Do Re Mi (1960)
- Subways Are for Sleeping (1961)
- Mr. Magoo's Christmas Carol (1962)
- Arturo Ui (1963) – Styne contributed incidental music to this Bertolt Brecht play
- Funny Girl (1964)
- Wonderworld (1964) – lyrics by Styne's son, Stanley
- Fade Out – Fade In (1964)
- Something More! (1964) – directed by Styne
- The Dangerous Christmas of Red Riding Hood (1965)
- Hallelujah, Baby! (1967)
- Darling of the Day (1968)
- Look to the Lilies (1970)
- The Night the Animals Talked (1970)
- Prettybelle (1971) – closed in Boston
- Sugar (1972) -revised as Some Like It Hot: The Musical for a 2002–03 national US tour starring Tony Curtis as Osgood Fielding, Jr.
- Lorelei (1974) – essentially a sequel/revival of Gentlemen Prefer Blondes
- Hellzapoppin'! (1976) – closed in Baltimore during pre-Broadway tryout
- Side by Side by Sondheim (1976) - included songs from Gypsy.
- Bar Mitzvah Boy (1978)
- One Night Stand (1980) – closed during preview period
- Pieces of Eight (1985)
- The Red Shoes (1993)
