= Do Re Mi =

Do Re Mi, Doremi, Do, Re, Mi, Fa, Sol, La, Si, Do-re-mi-fa-so-la-ti-do, or similar may refer to:

- Solfège, a system of learning musical scales (commonly: Do, Re, Mi, Fa, Sol, La, Ti)

== Music ==
=== Songs ===
- "Do-Re-Mi", a 1959 song by Rodgers and Hammerstein from the musical and film The Sound of Music
- "Do Re Mi" (Woody Guthrie song), a folksong by American songwriter Woody Guthrie
- "Do Re Mi" (Jahn Teigen song), the Norwegian entry in the Eurovision Song Contest 1983
- "Do Re Mi" (Nirvana song), a 1994 song by Nirvana from the 2004 box set, With the Lights Out
- "Doremi", a 2008 single by Verka Serduchka from Doremi Doredo
- "Do Re Mi" (Blackbear song), 2017
- "Do-re-mi-fa" (Korean: 도레미파), a 2024 single by Park Eun-bin from Present
- "Doremifa", written by Jang Dae-hyeon, Jo Yuri (Jam Factory), and Kim Yo-han, on Identity: First Sight by WEi, 2020
- "Do Re Mi Fa Sol" (Korean: 도레미파솔), a 2021 single by Park Bom featuring Changmo, written by Vivian Cha
- "Do Re Mi Fa Sol" (Korean: 도레미파솔), by Lee Seung-hoon My Type, 2024
- "Do-Ré-Mi-Fá-Sol-Lá-Si", an alternate name for "O Sapo Não Lavar o Pé", a song by Eliana on Os Dedinhos, 1993
- "Do-re-mi-fa-so-la-ti-do" (song), by Porter Robinson on Nurture, 2021
- "Do Re Mi Fa So La Shi Do", a 2000 single by Noriko Shiina

=== Albums ===
- Do-Re-Mi (June Christy and Bob Cooper album), 1961
- Do-Re-Mi (EP), a 1982 EP by Australian band Do-Re-Mi
- DoReMiFa, a 2007 album by Uri Nakayama
- Doremi Fasol Latido, a 1972 album by Hawkwind

=== Other uses in music ===
- Do-Re-Mi (band), an Australian band
- "Do re mi fa" for choir a cappella, an 1818 secular choir composition by Antonio Salieri
- Do, Re, Mi, Fa, Sol (petites pièces faciles), a piano duet chamber music work by André Caplet, 1901

== Arts and media businesses ==
- Doremi Labs (founded 1985; acquired 2014), an American audio/video product developer and manufacturer
- Doremi Entertainment, a South Korean management and production company

== Movies ==
- Do Re Mi (1966 film), a Malaysian comedy film, and two sequels
- Do Re Mi (1996 film), a Filipino musical comedy film
- Do Re Mi Fa, a 2016 film wherein Matthew Scurfield played Bozo's Conscience
- Do, Re, Mi, Fa, Sol, La, Si, o La vida privada de un tenor, a 1934 film by Edgar Neville
- Do Re Mi Fa So La Ti Do (film) (Korean: 도레미파솔라시도), a 2008 South Korean romantic drama film
- Do ré mi fa sol la si do, les Kummer, by Christophe de Ponfilly, which was awarded the UNESCO prize, International film and art festival, 1994

== Television ==
- Do-Re-Mi (TV series), a Czech amateur singer contest TV show
- Do, Re & Mi, an animated musical children's TV series
- Doremi Harukaze (Japanese: 春風どれみ), the title character of 1999 anime series Ojamajo Doremi
- Do-Re-Mi-Fa! (Japanese: ドレミでふぁ~!), a 1997–1998 Satellaview broadcast magazine
- DoReMiFa (Korean: 도레미파), a team on One Team Mission (Episode 8) of Build Up: Vocal Boy Group Survival
- Doremifa Otama, a character played by Hiroko Maruyama in 1981 anime Yattodetaman
- Do Ré Mi Fá Sol Lá Si, a children's program broadcast by SBT, 1988–1991
- Do Re Mi Fa So La Ti Do (Chinese: 哆唻咪发嗦啦嘻哆), a team competing on Produce 101 China

== Theater and literature ==
- Do Re Mi (musical), a 1960 musical by Betty Comden, Adolph Green and Jule Styne
- Do re ma fa – Sa re ni sa (also cited as Doremifa and Sarenisa), plays written by Mukesh Thali
- Do Re Mi Fa So La Ti Do, a manhua by Guiyeoni

== Other uses ==
- Do Re Mi Fa Sol, in the 2016 Prix de Malleret and 2018 Brontë Cup horse races
- "Do-re-mi-fa Inverter" (Japanese: ドレミファインバータ), nickname for the propulsion system used by the first two batches of the Keikyu N1000 series of trains

== See also ==
=== Similar-sounding terms ===
- Dough Re Mi, an American game show
- Adore Me, a direct-to-consumer women's intimate apparel brand based in New York City
- Doremy Sweet, a fictional character in Legacy of Lunatic Kingdom from the Touhou Project video game franchise

=== Prefix matches ===
Sorted alphabetically by suffix

- DoReMiFa Beat, a fictional rhythm game in 2016–2017 television show Kamen Rider Ex-Aid — see list of Kamen Rider Ex-Aid episodes and list of Kamen Rider Ex-Aid characters
- Doremifa Bridge, depicted in File:Hidaka Kinchakuda Doremifa Bridge 1.JPG
- Do Ré Mi com Vovó Mafalda, a children's program broadcast by SBT, 1991–1992
- Do Re Mi Fa So Cow, a 2019 album by So Cow
- "Do Re Mi Fa Daijōbu" (Japanese: ドレミファだいじょーぶ), a 1991 single by B.B.Queens, the opening theme to Old Enough!
- Do Re Mi Fa Densetsu, a Sega Pico game by Yamaha, released in 1993
- Do-Re-Mi-Fa Donuts, wherein Ryūsei Nakao voiced Resshi
- "Do Re Mi Fa Dōshite?" (Japanese: ドレミファどうして？), a song on 2010 album More Friends by Erina Mano
- DoReMi Fantasy: Milon's DokiDoki Adventure, a 1996 platformer video game
- Do-Re-Mi-Fa Girls' Blood is Roaring, which was filmed at the former Tokyo Industrial Laboratory in Hatsudai, as was The Sea and Poison (film)
- Do Re Mi Kong Kong Kong (Korean: 도레미 콩콩콩), a corner featuring the Do Re Mi 7 Siblings in Happy Together (talk show), season 1
- "Do-Re-Mi-Fa Lullaby" by Emiko Shiratori, the ending theme to Unico in the Island of Magic (1983)
- DoReMi Market (Korean: 도레미 마켓), a South Korean variety show
- Doremifa Nikki, a 1968 television show directed by Noriaki Yuasa
- "Do-Re-Mi-Fa-So oder so" by duo Mess (Elisabeth Engstler and Michael Scheickl)
- "Doremifa Onchi" (Japanese: ドレミファ音痴), a song by Next Girls on the Type A B-side of 2012 single "Gingham Check" by AKB48
- "Do-Re-Mi-Fa Party" (Japanese: ドレミファParty), the main theme of the anime adaptation of Show by Rock!!
- Do Re Mi Fa Sol La Si Do Piano Man, stage name of Joo Woo-jae in episode 89 of King of Mask Singer, 2016
- "Do Re Mi Fa Remi", episode 7 of Nobody's Boy: Remi, 1977
- "Doremifa Rondo" (Japanese: ドレミファロンド), a song produced by 40meterP and performed by Hatsune Miku in 2013 video game Hatsune Miku: Project Mirai 2
- Do-Re-Mi-Fa-So-La-{Ti/Shi}-Do-Shi-Shi-Do-Ru-Mi, a 1990 album by Rumi Shishido, which led to her role as Mikako in Neighborhood Story
- "Doremifa Ship", a song on 2008 album Panic Fancy by Orange Range
- "Do-Re-Mi-Fa Slider", a Prism Jump used by Mion in episode 12 of Pretty Rhythm: Aurora Dream, 2011
- Do Ré Mi Fá Sol Lá Simony, a television show presented by Simony (singer), 1988–1989
- Do Re Mi Fa Soldier, SSG Bonito Lamdag in S1 E15 of Philippine game show I Can See Your Voice, 2017
- "DoReMiFa-Soul" (Japanese version), a song on Fantasia (Hi-Fi Un!corn album), 2024
- "Do Re Mi Fa STARS!!" (Japanese: ドレミファSTARS!!), the opening theme to Show By Rock!! Stars!! (2021), the fourth season of rhythm video game Show by Rock!!
- Doremifa Summers, a 2012 special program on TX starring Megumi Ohori

=== Non-prefix matches ===
Sorted alphabetically

- Captain Doremifa, 1964–1966 television show on NHK Educational, wherein Natsue Washizu played Onē-san
- Japanese: COME ON！/ ドレミファソライロ, romanized: COME ON! / Doremifa-sorairo, a 2013 single by Dream5
- The Excitement of the Do-Re-Mi-Fa Girl, 1985 film by Kiyoshi Kurosawa starring Yoriko Dōguchi, and Juzo Itami as Professor Hirayama, included in the 1999 Toronto International Film Festival's "Spotlight: Kiyoshi Kurosawa" — see also Kandagawa Pervert Wars § Background, Million Film § 1980s
- Go! Anpanman: The Amazing Naganegiman and Princess Doremi (Japanese: それいけ!アンパンマン 怪傑ナガネギマンとドレミ姫), a 2003 animated short in the Anpanman franchise
- Let's Go! Anpanman: Doremifa Island's Christmas (それいけ!アンパンマン ドレミファ島のクリスマス), a 2012 Christmas special in the Anpanman franchise
- Miss You - Do Re Mi Fa, a 2018 Tamil music album produced by Muzik247
- "Pink Boushi no "Do Re Mi Fa So"" (Japanese: ピンク帽子の "ドレミファソ"), a 2010 digital single from The Heart Song Collection by Minmi
- Quiz! Do-re-mi-fa-don!, a quiz show television program on which Tadao Takashima appeared
- Quiz Do Re Mi Fa Grand Prix, a quiz arcade game developed by Konami, released in 1994
- Quiz! Kazoku Doremifa Taishō, a 1976 television show on CX, moderated by Aki Mizusawa and Takeaki Kashimura
- "Showa Ondo/Do-Re-Mi-Fa Ondo" (Japanese: 昭和音頭/ドレミファ音頭), a 1965 single by Katsuko Kanai
- "The secret of the rainbow is Do Re Mi Fa So?" (Japanese: 虹のひみつはドレミファソ？), episode 9 of Marie & Gali, 2009
- Variety Do Re Mi Fa So La Ti Do, a television show hosted by Yasuha, 1979–1982
