= List of Kamen Rider Ex-Aid episodes =

Kamen Rider Ex-Aid is a Japanese tokusatsu drama in the Kamen Rider series. It is the 18th installment of the franchise in the Heisei era, and the 27th overall. The series tells the story of a group of doctors who become Kamen Riders and use their power to fight the Bugsters, monsters created from a digital infection that originated from the video games that threaten the entire human race. It premiered on TV Asahi on October 2, 2016 with the last episode airing on August 27, 2017.

Like in most Japanese video game covers, each episode's title is written part in English, part in kanji. All of the episodes were written by Yuya Takahashi.

== Episodes ==
No.	Title	Directed by	Original release date
1	"I'm a Kamen Rider!"; Transliteration: "Aimu A Kamen Raidā!" (Japanese: I'm a 仮面ライダー！)	Shojiro Nakazawa	October 2, 2016
In the year 1999, an eight-year-old boy named Emu is rushed to the hospital after a supposed traffic accident. The surgery is a success, and the surgeon and future Minister of Health gives Emu a WonderSwan as a reward for being brave and holding onto life throughout the surgery. Emu begins preparing to become a doctor to save lives just like the surgeon; sixteen years later, Emu has grown to become a clumsy, but dedicated pediatrics intern at Seito University Hospital while spending his free time playing video games. One day, a disrespectful patient, a young boy named Sōta Suyama who is suffering from fainting spells due to an unknown ailment, flees. Emu encounters Asuna Karino, who is searching for M, known as the Mysterious Genius Gamer, who has apparently arrived back in Japan. They plan on giving him the Gamer Driver after the compatibility surgery, so that they can fight the threat of the returning Bugster Virus. After Sōta suddenly collapses and the Intern notices strange bumps on his neck, Asuna and the Intern bring Sōta to a special department in the hospital. Remembering the gesture the doctor gave to him as a child, Emu attempts to raise Sōta's spirits by bringing him to the launch of the much anticipated Mighty Action X. At the event, he runs into Asuna again, who was looking for M; she scolds him, reminding him that Sōta has surgery scheduled on the same day. A giant monster made out of pixels emerges from Sōta. While escaping, Asuna explains that Sōta has been afflicted with the Game Disorder, a computer virus which has mutated to infect humans. For this reason, it is called the Bugster Virus, which, much like a real computer virus or cancer in a body, will multiply in its host until it completely takes over. The only way to save those who have been infected is by using the Gamer Driver, but only those who have had the Compatibility Surgery performed on them can use it. Without permission, Emu takes the Gamer Driver Asuna was planning to give to M and uses it to become a Kamen Rider, revealing that he is M during the fight. He manages to extract the Salty Bugster from Sōta and defeat it. Asuna takes Emu to Cyber Research, which serves as the base of operations for the fight against Bugster, before revealing herself to be Poppy Pipopapo, a video game character from the fictional rhythm game DoReMifaBeat, who acts as a navigator. She explains to Emu that he will have to destroy the Bugsters from nine other games, labeling him Kamen Rider Ex-Aid, or Extreme Aid.
2	"Another Prodigy With No Thank You?"; Transliteration: "Tensai Futari wa Nō Sankyū?" (Japanese: 天才二人は no thank you？)	Shojiro Nakazawa	October 9, 2016
Now a member of the CR, Emu is introduced to his co-worker: the genius surgeon Hiiro Kagami, also known as Kamen Rider Brave, but Emu's disapproval of Hiiro's detached attitude towards the patients leads to professional difficulties between the Pedatrics Intern and the Genius Surgeon. They also encounter a mysterious Kamen Rider, one whom uses the power of Mighty Action X Beta appears during surgery, and beats them up.
3	"The Man Who Arrives With a Bang!"; Transliteration: "Ban Shita Aitsu ga Yattekuru!" (Japanese: BANしたあいつがやって来る！)	Koichi Sakamoto	October 16, 2016
License-less Doctor Taiga buys a Gamer Driver from Genm Corp., using the unfinished game Bang Bang Shooting to transform into Masked Rider Sniper. However, conflict inevitably erupts between the heroes when Hiiro chooses to be an obsessed revenge seeker, intent on 'dealing' with Taiga due to Taiga's failed excision of the Bugster known as Graphite from Saki Momose, Hiiro's girlfriend from medical school and the only woman he ever loved romantically, which resulted in her death. Taiga challenges Emu to a competition to defeat the latest Bugster, with their Games as the prize in a winner takes all ante.
4	"The Name of the Operation Is Dash!"; Transliteration: "Operēshon no Na wa Dasshu!" (Japanese: オペレーションの名はDash！)	Koichi Sakamoto	October 23, 2016
Emu meets Seito University Hospital Medical Examiner Kiriya Kujo, who brings him a friend who has been infected with the Bugster Virus. However, with Emu having lost his Game when Taiga destroyed the Bugster instead of Ex-Aid, Kiriya approaches Emu in CR and surprises him, offering a chance to recover the lost Game from Taiga if he will just oblige Kiriya some help.
5	"Everyone Is Here to Clash and Crash!"; Transliteration: "Zen'in Shūketsu, Gekitotsu Kurasshu!" (Japanese: 全員集結、激突Crash！)	Kyohei Yamaguchi	October 30, 2016
When a runaway criminal is infected with the Bugster Virus from Gekitotsu Robots, Emu and Hiiro clash over whether to save his life or not.
6	"The Pulse Is Pounding in the Heart!"; Transliteration: "Kodō o Kizame In Za Hāto!" (Japanese: 鼓動を刻め in the heart!)	Kyohei Yamaguchi	November 13, 2016
Emu and Hiiro help a young woman who not only was infected with the last Bugster Emu defeated, but is still infected with a second one that now threatens her life. Meanwhile, more details are revealed regarding Hiiro's feud with Taiga, and the reason why Taiga is eager to get revenge on the Graphite Bugster.
7	"The Essence of Some Lie!"; Transliteration: "Samu Rai no Gokui!" (Japanese: Some lieの極意！)	Shojiro Nakazawa	November 20, 2016
Kiriya Kujo is still in the hospital recovering, but when the elderly man in the next bed displays symptoms of Game Disease, he brings him and his daughter to CR. Emu and Poppy discover that the man is infected with Bugsters containing the two remaining stolen Gashats: the Samurai game Giri Giri Chambara, and the jet fighter game Jet Combat. However, due to Black Ex-Aid's interference, they both escape. When Kiriya breaks into the CR, he reveals to Emu that his friend was infected with the Bugster Virus on Zero Day and died shortly after. However, Hiiro refuses to trust him, as he has often lied. When the Samurai Bugster returns, Kiriya asks Emu to trust him to be honest so they can team up to defeat him. Emu gives the new Gashat to Kiriya, unlocking his Level 3. Lazer Chambara Bike then reveals Black Ex-Aid's identity as Kuroto Dan, Head of Genm Corp., and proceeds to beat him. However, when the smoke clears, Parado takes the Gamer Driver and Gashat and pretends to be Black Ex-Aid to hide Kuroto's identity. Hiiro then explains that Kiriya's friend didn't die from the Bugster Virus, but was killed in a traffic accident after panicking when Kiriya told him of his incurable infection. This causes everyone to believe that Kiriya cannot tell the truth, and therefore cannot be trusted.
8	"Fly High, Gentlemen!"; Transliteration: "Otoko-tachi yo, Furai Hai!" (Japanese: 男たちよ、Fly high！)	Shojiro Nakazawa	November 27, 2016
Taiga Hanaya/Kamen Rider Snipe locates the escaped Bugster and obtains the Jet Combat Gashat; however, rather than destroy the Bugster to cure the patient, he takes it hostage, leaving Emu unable to cure the old man. With all four Kamen Riders having access to Level 3 and on a level playing field, he decides that only he is needed to fight the Bugster, and draws Ex-Aid and Brave out to fight. He manages to beat them both, retrieving the DoReMiFa Beat and Gekitotsu Robots Gashats in the process before taking his leave. Meanwhile, Kiriya calls out Kuroto to battle under a bridge, commending him for his quick moves in replacing him with Parado, meaning that no one trusts him anymore. It is revealed that Kuroto's motivations for fighting are to find the source of Bugsters. He also reveals that, of the five Kamen Riders, the four had to undergo serious surgery to be compatible enough to use the Gamer Drivers and Gashats, whereas the remaining one, Emu, appears to naturally be able to do so. Graphite steals a Proto Gashat, an unrefined Gashat, from Genm's offices, and, despite the warnings of its uncontrollable power, fuses with it.
9	"Slay the Dragon!"; Transliteration: "Doragon o Buttobase!" (Japanese: Dragonをぶっとばせ！)	Satoshi Morota	December 4, 2016
Graphite infects Kyotaro Hinata, the same doctor who saved Emu's life sixteen years ago, with the Bugster Virus. With the life of his benefactor at risk, Emu desperately races against time to defeat the Bugster, while Graphite starts a mass infection that threatens to expose the truth of the Bugster Virus to the public. After obtaining a Level 5 Gashat, Drago Knight Hunter Z, Emu uses it to fight Graphite. However he loses control and falls unconscious.
10	"An Odd Party of Doctors!"; Transliteration: "Fuzoroi no Dokutāzu!" (Japanese: ふぞろいのDoctors！)	Satoshi Morota	December 11, 2016
Unable to control the powers of the new Drago Knight Hunter Z Gashat by himself, Emu realizes that he must work together with the other three Kamen Riders to fully control it and defeat Graphite. However, no one among them wants to cooperate with him, until he comes up with an idea.
11	"Who's the Kamen Rider in Black?"; Transliteration: "Fūzu Kuroi Kamen Raidā?" (Japanese: Who's 黒い仮面ライダー？)	Kyohei Yamaguchi	December 18, 2016
With Emu only a week away from completing his internship, a new Bugster escapes from a young boy about to be discharged from the hospital. Emu is shocked to find its Salty, the first Bugster he defeated, who has been revived and leveled up. Emu nearly defeats him using his Level 3 mode, but Genm arrives and helps Salty escape. Kuroto is close to completing his next stage of the plan, but to do that he needs data on something he hasn't had: Death. He informs the Kamen Riders that the only Gashat to complete is Shakariki Sports, the one used by Genm, and orders them to retrieve it. Using his position, he tricks Emu and Asuna to bring the boy to a skatepark, and Emu is forced to defend them when Genm arrives instead. Emu nearly loses his trust in his hero when Genm explains that Kyotaro Hinata is responsible for the Bugster's existence. However, Kiriya, haunted by Emu's earlier remarks about trust, saves him. With the four Kamen Riders united again using the Drago Knight Hunter Z Gashat, they easily overpower Genm. With his health bar falling dangerously close to zero, he loads an unmarked Gashat into his Gashacon Bugvisor and launches a finisher at the boy, but Emu deflects the attack. However, it turns out that this was all part of his plan, as the mysterious Genm uses his own death to create a new Gashat, revealing his identity as Kuroto Dan and proving Lazar's suspicions to be the truth. Kuroto taunts them, saying that the game has only just begun as he escapes, though the four Kamen Riders point out that, as his health zeroed, he will soon die. In their secret hideout, Parado applauds him for his terrifying tactic of using his own death to gather data, before Kuroto reveals the completed Gashat: Dangerous Zombie.
12	"Christmas Special: The Silver Xmas Threat!"; Transliteration: "Kurisumasu Tokubetsuhen Nerawareta Hakugin no Kurisumasu!" (Japanese: クリスマス特別編 狙われた白銀のXmas！)	Kyohei Yamaguchi	December 25, 2016
Emu is still hoping to save Shūhei and understand why he hates Christmas and cakes, despite his mother's insistence to the contrary. Investigating where he fell, Emu discovers the truth. The Salty Bugster makes a move by kidnapping Shūhei's mother, and Emu fights as Ex-Aid Sports Action Gamer while she escapes. She then returns to Shūhei, having been told by Emu what he found. Ex-Aid, Brave and Poppy then use limited-time Christmas power-ups and. using DoReMiFa Beat's rhythm, easily defeat the Bugster, with his data being collected by a departing Parado. The CR discuss the latest outbreak, and realise that the Bugster Virus is mutating to combat them. Meanwhile, Kiriya continues his investigation, visiting the former Genm Corp. CEO, Masamune Dan, also known as Kuroto's father, in prison. He then calls the three Kamen Riders and Poppy to a meeting. However, Kuroto gets there first, and, realising Kiriya knows too much, tricks him into using the Dangerous Zombie Gashat, which drains Kiriya's life bar dangerously low. He then takes the Gashat, using it to reveal his new form: Zombie Gamer Level 10. Lazer is easily overpowered, and his Rider Gauge zeroes out. The others arrive as the battle ends, with Genm taking the Gashacon Sparrow and the Giri Giri Chambara Gashat and leaving. Kiriya passes his Gamer Driver and Bakusou Bike Gashat to Emu before fading away. Just before the battle, Taiga is approached by a young girl named Nico Saiba, who asks him to fight Genius Gamer M.
13	"A Preordained Destiny"; Transliteration: "Sadamerareta Desutinī" (Japanese: 定められたDestiny)	Shojiro Nakazawa	January 8, 2017
In response to the recent outbreak, the Ministry of Health is forced to hold a press conference, where they reveal the existence of the Bugster Virus, as well as that of the CR and their two surgeons: Ex-Aid and Brave. The Kamen Riders are still mourning over losing Kiriya, while Taiga is hounded by Nico, who refuses to leave him alone until he agrees to beat up M. Kuroto decides to end the other Kamen Riders and reveals to Parado a blank Gashat riddled with the Bugster Virus, explaining that, if the Kamen Riders try to use it, they will be killed in seconds. Emu has begun his surgery internship with Hiiro as his teacher, who does not approve of Emu's time taken and him being distracted by Kiriya in surgery and in battle, and so takes away his Gashats and tells him to consider his future. Parado then approaches Emu, and after a deep conversation, gives him the blank Gashat as a way to defeat Genm. Meanwhile, the Bugster Alhambra, who had previously been defeated by Brave, is revived. The patient is another doctor, who reveals he has no intention of fighting the Bugster, as his cancer will soon kill him. Brave and Snipe are easily beaten by Alhambra and Genm, until Emu arrives and loads the new Gashat, which infects him with massive amounts of virus. To everyone's shock, Emu survives and creates a new Game: Mighty Brothers XX. Which, when unlocked to level up, creates two Ex-Aids.
14	"We're Kamen Rider!"; Transliteration: "Wīā Kamen Raidā!" (Japanese: We're 仮面ライダー！)	Shojiro Nakazawa	January 15, 2017
After levelling up, Ex-Aid is split into two mirror Ex-Aids, with one orange and the other green. However, they both claim to be the real one: each one respectively calls himself M and Emu. During their argument, Genm and the Alhambra Bugster leave. After powering down, a reformed Emu is stricken with a headache and passes out. Kuroto is angry at Parado for passing on the Gashat, but more so at Emu for creating a new "illegal" game, and vows to delete the game forever. Emu decides the best way to save the patient is for two operations: one on the Bugster, performed by him, and one on the cancer, which Hiiro initially refuses to do. However, Emu then calls him out on being scared of tarnishing his reputation as a genius surgeon if he fails his surgery, so he agrees to operate. Taiga is still being harassed by Nico, who refuses to explain her grudge against M. However, when discussing Emu's personality change when he plays games, he realises something. The Alhambra Bugster tries to call Hiiro out to fight, but Emu reveals Hiiro is busy operating. Using Kiriya's power, he starts to beat Alhambra, until Genm arrives. Declaring himself the "Game Master", he wants to destroy the illegal game. Emu levels up to Double Action Gamer Level XX and realises the truth: they are both him, as his two personalities have split into the Genius Gamer and the patient-concerned Doctor. With both sides in harmony using co-op gameplay, they easily defeat the Bugster. Genm then retrieves the data and leaves. When he powers down, he faints again as a watching Taiga approaches from behind, and takes a sample of Emu's blood. The surgery is a success. Meanwhile, Taiga, uncertain why Ex-Aid could split, runs an analysis on the blood sample collected, and learns that Emu is infected with Game Disease.
15	"Here Comes a New Challenger!"; Transliteration: "Arata na Charenjā Arawaru!" (Japanese: 新たなchallenger現る！)	Satoshi Morota	January 22, 2017
Furious that Taiga has still not beaten Emu up, Nico steals Taiga's Gamer Driver and tries to use it against Emu. Unaware that it requires compatibility surgery to work, she becomes infected with the Game Disease instead, spawning the Revol Bugster. Despite Ex-Aid, Snipe, and Brave's attempts, Kuroto's interference allows it to escape. He is then intercepted by Taiga, and reveals the secret behind Emu's infection. Six years ago, one year before Zero Day, Emu was kidnapped by the Next Genome Institute after winning a game tournament, and became Bugster Virus Patient Zero. After the staff members disappeared, Emu was returned to his normal life with no memory of what happened. Having overheard the conversation, both Taiga and the eavesdropping Hiiro decide to fight Ex-Aid to clear it. They call Emu to a warehouse and, without telling him out of fear of forcing the stress to activate the virus, attack him mercilessly, with Snipe claiming the Drago Knight Hunter Z Gashat. However, using data collected from Genm's fights with Ex-Aid Double Action Gamer, Parado makes his move and reveals his new form: Kamen Rider Para-DX Level 50. He easily trounces the Kamen Riders, claiming that he is simply playing, and leaves. The Kamen Riders fall back with Asuna helping Emu, whose headache is getting worse.
16	"The Paradox of Defeating M"; Transliteration: "Datō Emu no Paradokkusu" (Japanese: 打倒MのParadox)	Satoshi Morota	January 29, 2017
Nico has practically moved into the CR, but refuses to let Emu get near her, seemingly getting more angry when he explains that he cannot remember ever meeting her. Hiiro asks Emu why he became a doctor. Emu explains that, six years earlier, he was more focused on playing games, so he stayed up for three days and nights straight to win a tournament. After winning, he passed out from exhaustion, during which he had a dream about the operation when he was a child. However, Hiiro realises that he actually remembers the Next Genome Institute's experiments. Worried about his future, he decided to focus his entire efforts on becoming a doctor. Trying again to force the Bugster out without alerting Emu to his infection, Hiiro then takes him outside and attacks him. The Revol Bugster reappears and, to Emu's surprise, stands up to defend him against Hiiro. Emu realises that the reason for this, and why he could not hurt Revol, is because he is the source of Nico's stress, despite not knowing why she is, as she will not tell him. While they are fighting, Taiga breaks into the CR and takes Nico back to his hospital, claiming that he cares about her, but in reality, he is setting a trap for Ex-Aid. Genm interferes on the battlefield and quickly defeats both the Kamen Riders, taking the Taddle Quest and DoReMiFa Beat Gashats. As he moves to take Emu's Gashats, the Bugster inside takes over and forces him back. However to both Genm and Hiiro's shock, Emu still seems to be in control. Parado then arrives, chastizing Genm for trying to ruin his fun as they leave. Following Nico and Taiga, Emu and Asuna find them, where Emu reveals that he finally remembers who she is and why she hates him - Nico Saiba, also known as Genius Gamer N. Years earlier, Champion Gamer M (Emu) was in a final showdown on Tekken against twelve year old upcomer Genius Gamer N (Nico). M won and, despite the occasion, enjoyed the competition and looked forward to playing again. However, as Nico made a career from playing in game tournaments and Emu was the only person she lost to, her only goal is to avenge her only loss in any way she can, to the point of seeking to become a Kamen Rider herself. Taiga rightfully chastises her, saying that being Kamen Riders is not just another game, as they are there for a reason: fighting with their only lives. While Asuna deals with a fleeing Nico, Taiga lures Emu away to fight him again. Before the fighting can begin, Revol and his forces appear to defend Emu. As Snipe fights them, Emu finds Kuroto and Parado arriving, and takes them on to protect the operation. Asuna has dragged an uncooperative Nico to the fight to show her how they are putting their lives on the line to save people from infection, not just to play games. As Snipe Hunter Shooting Gamer battles Genm, with help from Nico and a mop, Para-DX battles Ex-Aid Double Action Gamer, and uses his power-up combination ability to knock Ex-Aid down to just Emu. However, before he can finish it, Revol attacks Para-DX to defend Emu. Para-DX quickly turns on Revol and defeats him in a single blow, clearing the game and Nico of her infection, claiming that he will destroy anyone, friend or foe, who gets in the way of his fun. After the battle, Emu's headache returns. Nico, despite everything, explains she still intends to avenge her defeat, and follows Taiga, leading everyone to assume she will be around more.
17	"A Burgster Unlike Any Other?"; Transliteration: "Kikaku-gai no Bāgusutā?" (Japanese: 規格外のBURGSTER?)	Kyohei Yamaguchi	February 5, 2017
A lovable new Bugster styled after a Hamburger appears, and Emu begins to suspect this is different from the other Bugsters encountered so far. He learns that a new game, Ju Ju Burger, has been under development and that the Bugster is from the game. How will they respond to this unusual Bugster? Time to break out Ex-Aid Level 4?!
18	"The Truth Comes Out!"; Transliteration: "Abakareshi Turūsu!" (Japanese: 暴かれしtruth！)	Kyohei Yamaguchi	February 12, 2017
As revenge for creating an illegal game without the permission of the "Game Master", Kuroto infects Tsukuru with the Bugster Virus. The Bugster is revealed to be Motors, of Bakusou Bike. Taiga transforms to Snipe Hunter Shooting Gamer, but is beaten by Genm Zombie Gamer, who takes Taiga's Gashats and leaves, promising that Emu would lose his in their next encounter. Parado chastises Genm for this, reminding him that Ex-Aid is for him to fight. When they next fight, Kuroto reveals a new weapon, the Gashat Gear Dual β – one Gashat with two games: Taddle Fantasy and Bang Bang Simulations. Using the Taddle Fantasy mode, he summons the Fantasy Gama support robot, which forces Emu out of his transformation. Genm then destroys Motors without a second thought, reiterating that the Bugsters and Kamen Riders are both his pawns. Parado becomes enraged by this and Genm's attempt to destroy Ex-Aid despite their earlier conversation, and becomes Para-DX Knock Out Gamer, defeating Genm as Para-DX Puzzle Gamer. Angered by this betrayal, Kuroto announces that he will get revenge on Parado by crushing his wish. Kuroto then calls out to Emu, and offers him the answer to why he can transform, create Gashats and suffers headaches. Taiga, Hiiro and Parado rush Kuroto to stop him, but he beats them to it. He reveals the truth: Emu is not only infected with Game Disease, but is Patient Zero – the first person ever infected. Emu then suffers a massive stress attack, causing the Bugster to activate and dissolving Emu in light, ripping his body apart. While Kuroto laughs at his final victory, Parado, Hiiro, Taiga, Asuna, and Nico watch in horror as Emu starts to fade away.
19	"Suddenly Fantasy!?"; Transliteration: "Fantajī wa Totsuzen ni!?" (Japanese: Fantasyは突然に!?)	Shojiro Nakazawa	February 19, 2017
Emu awakens in the CR a few days after his stress-induced outbreak, having been told that he is Bugster Patient Zero, and seems fine. Hiiro and Asuna recall that as Emu started to fade away, he quickly returned to normal and collapsed. However, after a brief talk with Emu, they see that his personality is different, quickly realising he is now Genius Gamer M, despite not playing games. Kuroto is livid that Emu did not vanish and die as he was supposed to, and decides to collect the six remaining Bugsters as fast as possible to complete his masterpiece. Hiiro realises that the Bugster Virus inside Emu took the form of the personality that likes playing games - Genius Gamer M, the personality that took control of Emu's body when the stress forced the outbreak. They then receive word of a new patient, and Emu takes a break from Poppy's dancing game to go play the "Bugster-busting game". Finding the patient to be under the control of the Gatton Bugster, Emu begins to transform to play the game. As he does, Hiiro is horrified as Emu's eyes flash red, showing the Bugster is at full power. Becoming Ex-Aid Robot Action Gamer, Emu is easily overpowered by the level gap, so uses the power-up items around him to overcome and beat the Bugster into suppression, forcing it back into the human. Hiiro is shocked by how Emu shows no care or feeling for his patient anymore, and berates him at how he was supposed to make his patients smile again. Emu is then stricken by a massive headache as the Bugster momentarily starts losing control, but he shakes it off. Hiiro then takes the Mighty Action X Gashat and dismisses Emu, who consoles himself by playing games. While talking to the patient, the Bugster reactivates, and Hiiro chases it into town. With no other choice, Hiiro decides to use the Mighty Action X Gashat, but just before he can insert it, Emu snatches it back and transforms. Ex-Aid seems to be stronger than normal, but shows no remorse or care for his actions. However, he is knocked down by the combined effect of Genm and Gatton. Genm then summons the Fantasy Gama to finish Ex-Aid, however Hiiro swipes the Mighty Action X Gashat out of Emu's Gamer Driver, and goads Genm into attacking him. The Fantasy Gama attacks Hiiro. However, Hiiro remembers how Emu used the power-ups in his environment earlier, and lures the robot into a confusion power-up, which forces it to attack Genm, knocking the Gashat Gear Dual β out of his hand and into Hiiro's. Genm says that because Hiiro only mastered at Level 5, he will never be able to handle the power of the Level 50 Gashat. Hiiro becomes Kamen Rider Brave Fantasy Gamer Level 50, but the dark power quickly overwhelms his body, forcing him to attack Ex-Aid. However, Hiiro cites how he is the greatest doctor in the world because of the willpower he has to do anything to save his patients, and takes control of the power. Hearing how Hiiro uses willpower to become a great doctor, Emu collapses to the floor in pain with a headache, as his personality returns to the normal Emu, who has no idea how he got there. Hiiro quickly masters the powers of the Taddle Fantasy Demon King, and trounces Genm and Gatton. Genm loads the Taddle Quest Gashat into the Gashacon Sword, and the Drago Knight Hunter Z Gashat into the Gashacon Sparrow for a final attack, but the Level 2 and 5 attacks are no match for the Level 50 strike, after which Hiiro reclaims the two Gashats and destroys Gatton, curing the patient. Genm gathers the Bugster data and departs. Hiiro is severely weakened by his use of the Gashat Gear Dual β, but helps the patient home. Later, Emu apologises for his actions, even though he does not know or understand why he did them. Hiiro returns the Mighty Action X Gashat, and tells Emu that he needs to learn to increase his mental fortitude. From a distance, a gleeful Parado welcomes Emu back.
20	"Take Off Against the Wind!"; Transliteration: "Gyakufū kara no Teiku Ofu!" (Japanese: 逆風からのtake off！)	Shojiro Nakazawa	February 26, 2017
Taiga is angry at Nico for tricking him into going to an amusement park, as Nico had lied about a patient so that Taiga can unwind after losing his Gashats and threatens to tell the others about his fear of ghosts if he does not back off. While there, they come across a high school boy showing the early signs of outbreak. At Seito University Hospital, Hiiro and Emu prepare for the operation to remove the Bugster from Emu. However, when Hiiro activates the Taddle Quest Gashat, the Bugster does not emerge. Emu realizes that the reason his personality changes when he plays games is because the Bugster takes control, and admits that he is scared of himself. Meanwhile, Parado visits Kuroto to gloat about his recent loss of his Level 50 Gashat. Emu, Hiiro and Asuna arrive at the location of the call about a new patient and learn Taiga and Nico made the call. Taiga has identified the source as the Jet Combat Bugster, but a sly remark from Nico to the boy about how girls do not like wimps forces the Vernier Bugster out. Hiiro becomes Brave Fantasy Gamer, but Emu hesitates about becoming Ex-Aid. Parado arrives and challenges Ex-Aid, but Emu refuses. Brave forces the Bugster to retract into the boy, and accepts Parado's challenge. Brave manages to wound Para-DX Puzzle Gamer, however Parado uses power-ups to turn the tide and knock Brave down. Rather than finish him, he remarks that Level 50 is too much for him, and will look him up later. Hiiro then powers down, and faints from exhaustion as Taiga and Nico take him back to their hospital. Back at CR, Emu reveals to Asuna that he is afraid to use his Gashats, in case the Bugster takes control and he cannot return to normal. The boy reveals that a girl in his class he likes asked him to the amusement park, but he does not like thrill rides and does not want to seem bad because of it, and so unsuccessfully went alone to get over his fear. The three then go to the park to ride rollercoasters and thrill rides, but the boy is still worked up, Emu has lost the appeal of rides, and Asuna is enjoying herself at the expense of everyone else. However, when two passing girls laugh at the boy because he had a panic attack riding a ferris wheel, the Bugster takes control again. Hiiro goes to answer the call for help, but Taiga stops him because he is injured and weak. Taiga explains that the Gashat Gear Dual β's two games are updated versions of their own, meaning he has half-ownership of the Gashat. Hiiro says that despite treating him, he can never forgive the man who let his girlfriend die. Taiga explains that Hiiro and Emu both have bright and prosperous careers ahead of them, and want neither to them to make the same mistake he made. Moved by this truth, Hiiro lets Taiga take the Gashat Gear Dual β and join the battle. Genm transports Emu, Asuna and the Bugster to a battlefield, where Emu refuses to transform, having lost the will to fight. Taiga arrives and transforms into Kamen Rider Snipe Simulation Gamer Level 50. He easily defeats the air-fleet summoned by the Bugster while telling Emu to leave, as he will only ever care about himself now. Realising that this is not who he is or wants to be, Emu declares that he is a doctor, casts off his doubts and, with his will to fight stronger than ever, activates the Mighty Brothers XX Gashat. The double team take on Genm, whilst Snipe destroys the Bugster, curing the boy. The Ex-Aids use the Gashacon Key Slasher's Critical Finish to Genm, who uses the smoke from the blast to collect the Bugster data and disappear. The boy is declared clear, and vows to man up and overcome his fear to meet the girl. Taiga chastises Emu for not listening to him, but Emu reaffirms his commitment to being a doctor, taking care of both his patients and himself. Kuroto returns to his hideout weakened and finds Parado there, remarking that he needs to stop causing fights and finish his master game instead. Kuroto then reveals that the reason he chose his power to be Dangerous Zombie is because the Gashat is not only Level 10, but also Level X (unknown).
21	"Pursue the Mystery!"; Transliteration: "Misuterī o Tsuiseki seyo!" (Japanese: mysteryを追跡せよ！)	Satoshi Morota	March 5, 2017
The latest CR patient who is investigating the Bugster Virus' origin and its ties to two missing people: Genm Corp. CEO Kuroto Dan and Medical Examiner Kiriya Kujo. This leaves the doctors with the difficult choice to uncover the truth of why Kuroto killed Kiriya, with Emu visiting Kuroto's father Masamine at prison. Upon recognizing Emu and explaining that the Bugster Virus first appeared just after Y2K, Masamune reveals that he was actually a scapegoat and the real mastermind of the Zero Day epidemic was Kuroto, the owner of the laptop that the virus first appeared on. Taiga manages to recover his Bang Bang Shooting Gashat from Genm, and when Nico asks how he intends to defeat an immortal zombie, he reveals he has a plan. He goes to Tsukuru, and offers him a vast sum of money to cope with Burgermon's death and create a new Gashat that can be used against undead opponents. While Emu and Asuna are learning the truth, the Kaiden Bugster in the detective reactivates, and Hiiro operates as Brave Hunter Quest Gamer. Genm arrives to silence Emu, and they find their way onto the same battlefield. After Brave cures the detective, Ex-Aid Double Action Gamer lands a fatal blow on Genm which forces him out of transformation. However, he reveals they have all played into his hand: the death data frmo his defeats has powered up the Dangerous Zombie to Level X, which Hiiro recognises as the unknown variable, meaning his power could now be limitless. He also reveals his goal of creating his ultimate game: Kamen Rider Chronicle - where ordinary people become Kamen Riders and fight for their lives. Enraged by how Kuroto plays with peoples' lives and vowing to avenge everyone who has died because of him, Ex-Aid delivers a crushing blow to the now super-charged Genm, who mysteriously disappears. Having overheard Kuroto's rant and the truth of his actions, the detective tells Emu he will pass his findings to his superiors and the ministry so a manhunt for Kuroto can commence.
22	"The Conspired History!"; Transliteration: "Shikumareta Hisutorī!" (Japanese: 仕組まれたhistory！)	Satoshi Morota	March 12, 2017
Kuroto reviews that only clearing the refined data of DoReMiFa Beat, Shakariki Sports and Drago Knight Hunter Z is needed to complete Kamen Rider Chronicle. However, when the Ministry of Health storm his hideout to take him in for his involvement in Zero Day, Kuroto is revealed to have become infected. Meanwhile, prior to a receiving a callout, Hiiro is going through Kiriya's belongings at the Medical Examiners Office when he finds a laptop containing a "Reprograming" program. Emu and Asuna arrive at a skatepark to find a group of people, the team from the Ministry of Health, being hounded by a Bugster on a mountain bike, which Emu recognises as Charlie from Shakariki Sports. Transforming into Ex-Aid Double Action Gamer, the two halves work together to ensnare him as Hiiro and Taiga arrive and note Genm is nowhere to be seen, with only Parado waiting for them. Ex-Aid manages to get the Bugster to withdraw into the host's body, revealed to be Kuroto. All the fighting stops and Parado leaves. Before they can get answers, the Ministry officials come to take Kuroto away. However, Emu steps in and tells them that Kuroto has Game Disease, and so will be taken to the CR to be treated. The officials tell him to let them leave, but Hiiro unexpectedly supports Emu, telling the officials that if the Bugster breaks out again in their custody, it would place both them and any civilians in danger, asking if they are prepared to run this risk. The lead official tells them that he will report to his superiors that they stopped them, which will possibly result in the doctors receiving administrative punishment. Kuroto is then taken by Emu to the CR, with Taiga remarking that he will defeat Genm. At the CR, expressing his plans are ruined and blaming his actions on Emu, Kuroto reveals that he was once a top game designer in his father's company while attending middle school in the 200s. Creating best sellers one-after-another overinflated his ego. This was to the point that he was jealous of Emu when he received a fan-mail letter of game ideas that exceed his own and deliberately send the child a Mighty Action demo riddled with the Bugster Virus. A decade later, Kuroto abducted Emu following his win at a gaming competition to hand over to the Next Genome Institute as a favor, using a sample of the harvested virus as base code for the Zero Day outbreak. Taiga and Nico visit Genm Corp. to get an update on the new Gashat, but the team are struggling with a visual concept to base it on. Hiiro then arrives, bringing Kiriya's computer. He tells them that on it is the "Reprogramming" virus, a data stream which can rewrite the coding of a Bugster and a possible means to counter Genm's immortality. As the data is uploaded to the blank Gashat, a swarm of Bugsters invade the office, led by Genm. Taiga gives the Gashat Gear Dual β to Hiiro, meaning he will use the new one once complete. Brave Fantasy Gamer fights off the Bugsters, but is no match for Genm. Snipe arrives and loads the Gashat, but when he tries to use it, it fails to work, instead knocking Taiga out of his transformation. Emu realises that Kuroto is trying to force him to lash out, but calmly tells an awestruck Kuroto that cannot hold a grudge against a patient, but will still treat him so can be punished for his crimes. As Charlie reemerges, Ex-Aid Double Action Gamer takes him on and swiftly defeats him. But as the smoke clears, Kuroto is capturing the data on the Gashacon Bugvisor, and laughs maniacally at Emu's gullibility. Kuroto reveals that he deliberately infected himself to buy more time and lied about his feelings of remorse, revealing that he saw Emu as nothing more than an ideal guinea pig. He then transforms into Genm, unleashing its latent power to create clones of himself to swarm Ex-Aid and corrode his Gamer Driver beyond function. Kuroto spares Emu for his cooperation, later turning up in a suit and new look at Genm Corp., shocking Hiiro and Taiga to learn they have been fighting a copy. With Genm Corp. tower cleared and now under his control, he is one step closer to unleashing his ultimate plan. Parado watches from afar, quipping that the game is now entering its final stage.
23	"Extreme Dead or Alive!"; Transliteration: "Kyokugen no Deddo oa Araibu!" (Japanese: 極限のdead or alive！)	Kyohei Yamaguchi	March 19, 2017
As Kuroto has turned the Genm Corp. headquarters into a fortress, Kyotaro calls Emu, Hiiro, Taiga, Poppy, and Nico to the CR, and informs them that they have 48 hours to take down Kuroto or Project Kamen Rider will be shut down. While discussing how to take him down, Taiga and Hiiro reveal the blank Gashat to Emu, explaining it to be based on a program Kiriya created that alters a Bugster's coding. They then learn that the police blockade outside Genm Corp. is under attack. Hiiro swaps the Gashat Gear Dual β for the blank one with Taiga, and while he looks into making it work, Taiga and Emu leave. Arriving at the blockade, Kuroto gloats that it is pointless Emu until realizing that Emu is using Kiriya's Gamer Driver. As Ex-Aid Double Action Gamer and Snipe Simulation Gamer tackle the grunts and Nico clears the wounded police and Ministry officials, they find themselves outgunned because the grunts share Genm's immortality. Hiiro then arrives and gives the blank Gashat to Emu, saying he is the only one who can make it work, as he created Mighty Brothers XX as a product of his childhood dream realized. While going through Kiriya's notes, Hiiro realized that Kiriya was killed to keep him from devising a means to eliminate the Bugster Virus. Furthermore, Hiiro theorized that Emu's possession of the original Bugster Virus strain enables him to create new Gashats like the Mighty Brothers XX Gashat. When Emu appeared to be unable to activate the Gashat, Hiiro then asks Emu if he is going to accept the fate of Kuroto destroying the Gashat. This triggers a memory of Kiriya's dying words that causes Emu to consciously activate his Bugster Virus and empowers the blank Gashat to create a new game, Maximum Mighty X. Emu transforms into Ex-Aid Maximum Gamer Level 99 to trounce the grunts while reprograming the Dangerous Zombie Gashat to render Genm mortal. Taiga hears this and blasts Genm, with Emu smashing him across the field, reducing his health to one bar. Emu then reverts, telling Taiga that he is a doctor first and will not take a life as Kuroto escapes. Angered at how he has no Bugsters to call for support, Kuroto infects a large crowd with the Bugster Viruses to amass data on DoReMiFa Beat and Drago Knight Hunter Z and complete his final game. As Hiiro and Taiga confront Genm, Parado approaches Emu and reveals that Kuroto is technically dead and must be out of his misery so Emu can finish the game with his ideal ending. Emu then arrives as Genm discards the DoReMiFa Beat and Jet Combat Gashats, proceeding to fight him without restraint while Snipe and Brave deal with the clones Genm created. Genm uses the Giri Giri Chambara Gashat for a finisher, but it is easily knocked away by Ex-Aid, who then uses a finisher on Genm. This knocks the four out of the stage back to the real world, where they all power down. Kuroto goes to transform again, only to learn that Emu neutralized his Bugster Virus antibody and rendered him unable to transform. Parado then shows up, giving Kuroto a lethal Bugster viral infection while taking Gashacon Bugvisor and Dangerous Zombie Gashat to take Kamen Rider Chronicle for himself. Back at CR, the team revels that Genm has been defeated, and that all ten original Gashats are in their possession: Hiiro has the DoReMiFa Beat Gashat back, Taiga has the Jet Combat Gashat, and Emu has claimed the Giri Giri Chambara Gashat. As Kyotaro congratulates them, Emu is sad that he could not save Kuroto. Hiiro comforts him, saying that learning to deal with a patient's death, and how they cope with it, is a massive part of being a doctor. Alone on the roof, Emu slowly cries.
24	"Embracing Ambitions, Go Together!"; Transliteration: "Taishi o Idaite Gō Tugezā!" (Japanese: 大志を抱いてgo together！)	Kyohei Yamaguchi	March 26, 2017
Part 2 of "Kamen Rider × Super Sentai: Ultra Super Hero Taisen Movie Roadshow Commemoration Special". After Kuroto's death, Parado moves on with his ambition to complete "Kamen Rider Chronicle", and when multiple individuals become infected with the Bugster Virus, a warrior from outer space appears to lend Ex-Aid and the others a hand. Meanwhile, the new Genm Corp. CEO makes an impression on Poppy when he hypnotises her and brings her back to Parado, who revives all the other Bugsters along with Graphite to complete the base coding for the ultimate game: Kamen Rider Chronicle.
25	"A New Game Starts!"; Transliteration: "Nyū Gēmu Kidō!" (Japanese: New game起動！)	Shojiro Nakazawa	April 2, 2017
Still worried about Poppy's disappearance, Emu and Hiiro are dispatched to attend multiple occurrences around the city and discover that not only has Parado completed "Kamen Rider Chronicle", but has released it commercially and it is taking the country by storm. As civilians transform into Ride-Players to fight the Bugsters, things get worse when Poppy shows up as the game's guide and turns the Ride-Players against the Kamen Riders, saying they have special power-up weapons. Despite the danger, Emu tries to help, and it is only after a group of Ride-Players are defeated by Parado that they realise he is using it to drag the population into the conflict.
26	"Players Who Bet on Survival"; Transliteration: "Seizon o Kaketa Pureiyāzu" (Japanese: 生存を賭けたplayers)	Shojiro Nakazawa	April 9, 2017
Amidst the chaos caused by "Kamen Rider Chronicle", the CR has its activities suspended by the government, as, whenever a Kamen Rider arrives on the battlefield, the civilians attack them believing they are special players. Things get worse when Poppy herself joins the battle using a new Driver and Gashat to transform into a Kamen Rider. Parado explains that she was not hypnotised - her memory was erased, so she does not remember being a hero. The CR's newest patient, ignoring the ministries warning takes to social media, smears the CR and organises a group of Ride-Players to work together to fight the Bugsters, but they are still overwhelmed. Despite the orders to stand down, Emu goes to fight and save the patients he can, motivating Hiiro and Taiga to remember that being a doctor is more than having a licence to operate - it is about saving people. Ex-Aid Maximum Gamer, Brave Hunter Quest Gamer and Snipe Simulation Gamer work together to destroy Salty and Alhambra, while Parado is weakened and retreats. The patient admits he was wrong, and vows to use social media to champion the CR.
27	"Love & Peace for the Winner!"; Transliteration: "Shōsha ni Sasagu Rabu Ando Pīsu!" (Japanese: 勝者に捧ぐlove＆peace！)	Satoshi Morota	April 16, 2017
Ren Amagasaki reveals to the public that anyone who disappeared after getting a "Game Over" will be revived once the final boss of Kamen Rider Chronicle has been defeated, thus drawing people to ignore the Ministry of Health's ban of the game and play. While Hiiro dismisses this as a lie to entice people, Emu wonders if it might be true. Their discussion is interrupted by a new patient, and they arrive on scene to find a Ride-Player being beaten by Revol and his troops. Confirming she is now infected with Revol's Game Disease, Kamen Riders Ex-Aid and Brave transform to Level 2. Nico uses the Kamen Rider Chronicle Gashat to become a Ride-Player, naming herself Ride-Player Nico. She easily defeats Revol, earning a Gashatrophy clear emblem of Bang Bang Shooting. Poppy explains that they are proof of the Bugsters' defeat, and that Nico is the first in the nation to get a Gashatrophy. However, by using Chronicle, she is once again infected with Game Disease. While Hiiro tends to her, Emu talks to the woman they just saved, who explains she only entered the game to get her boyfriend back. Emu dodges her question about the validity of Ren's words and asks her to leave the rest to the CR. Taiga arrives at CR as Emu and Hiiro confirm Nico has Game Disease from Vernier. When asked why she joined the fight, Nico says that she was tired of watching the three of them being the heroes, and now that she can become a hero, her skill as a Genius Gamer allows her to clear the games faster than anyone else. After Taiga's yelling causes her symptoms to get worse, Hiiro hypothesises that the stress of not playing games is the cause of her infection. When word reaches the CR of more Bugsters, Emu, Hiiro and Nico arrive to find Vernier on the move. The three are then attacked by Ren Amagasaki, who reveals he is Loverica, a Bugster from Toki Meki Crisis. Nico attacks Vernier while Ex-Aid and Brave, with help from a late arriving Snipe, take on Loverica, who uses the power of words and charm to trounce the three Kamen Riders, explaining the purpose of his game is to win the affection of an entourage of female Bugsters, including Poppy. Nico is also defeated and untransforms. Lovrica berates Taiga for caring for Nico with his cold attitude to everyone. Taiga reveals that he is cold because it is who he needs to be, so that no one gets close to him. He believes the only one who can defeat the Bugsters is someone with nothing to lose, and while the others have their careers, their families and lives at stake, he does not. However, when Nico forced herself into his life, he was happy being called a Doctor again, and tells her that as long as she vows to fight and as long as she is his patient, he will cure her. The affection turns from Loverica towards Taiga, who becomes Snipe Simulation Gamer and easily defeats Vernier. When Loverica talks again, Nico calls him lame, which causes him to be critically hit and fly off as he is defeated. Emu asks Nico and Taiga to join them, saying that the best way forward is for the four of them to work together; however, they brush him off, with Taiga saying that they will clear the game. As they take their leave, Hiiro muses that despite his best efforts, Emu is not the one who will make Nico smile. As he locks up the CR later that night, Emu remembers that when Nico and Taiga made up, Poppy smiled.
28	"Beyond the Identity"; Transliteration: "Aidentiti o Koete" (Japanese: Identityを超えて)	Satoshi Morota	April 23, 2017
Emu tells Hiiro that, when Nico and Taiga made up after Vernier and Loverica's defeat, she smiled and said "thank goodness", which he thinks means that she remembers her past, despite Parado claiming that her memory was erased. Hiiro dismisses this, saying that she is now sided with the enemy. When they find Para-DX attaching a Ride-Player to draw them out, Ex-Aid Maximum Gamer takes him on while Brave Beat Quest Gamer tries to tell the Ride-Player to leave. Poppy arrives, disqualifies Hiiro, and attacks the Ride-Player who attacks her first. She reveals that, although she is a navigator, she is also the Bugster for DoReMiFa Beat. Ex-Aid tries to reason with her, ignoring Para-DX's attacks and hers. He then uses a finisher on her, reprogramming the evil Bugster in her to return her to normal; however, Parado takes her away again. At the CR, Emu tells Taiga that, although he knows she must be defeated to cure the patient of his Game Disease, he wants to save her as well. Hiiro reminds him that she has already taken a life: the person whose body she consumed to give birth to her. Meanwhile, Poppy remembers things she did not before as a result of the reprogramming, and Graphite explains that she is remembering her host's memories that she carries, like he carries those of Hiiro's girlfriend. Parado confronts her alone, and says that Bugsters are the scourge of humanity and exist only to further the game to defeat the humans. Poppy runs off to be alone, while Taiga is ignoring calls for help and is instead helping Nico clear the game, resulting in them collecting the Gashatrophy for Salty and Alhambra in one morning. With the three easiest down, he reminds her the real battle begins soon. While watching a dance group practice, Poppy is attacked by two Ride-Players trying to cure themselves. When the others arrive, Ex-Aid Maximum Gamer takes on Parado while Brave Beat Quest Gamer, Snipe Simulation Gamer, and Ride-Player Nico attack Poppy, scaring off the two Ride-Players. Ex-Aid barely pays attention to his fight, seeing that Poppy is not defending herself. As the three prepare to deal the final blow, Ex-Aid ejects from his armor, which he leaves restraining Para-DX, and stands between the Riders and Poppy, saying they cannot destroy her even though it is the only way to cure the patients. Poppy tells him to let them, repeating Parado's words and saying she will destroy humanity. Emu untransforms, and tells her to prove it. He holds her Gashacon Bugvisor II to his heart and tells her to destroy him, but she cannot, saying all she wants to do is play her game. Emu promises her that they will both do what she wants, and clears the game, curing the patient. Taiga hypothesises that he cleared it by making her smile, like he did with Burgermon. Parado, who was freed when Emu powered down, is fed up that Emu will not play with him and fuses with Emu, taking over his body.
29	"We're Me!?"; Transliteration: "Wīā Ore!?" (Japanese: We're 俺!?)	Kyohei Yamaguchi	April 30, 2017
After possessing Emu's body, Parado flees, leaving the others wondering about why the Bugster is so obsessed with him. Back at his hideout, Graphite urges Parado to take the chance to kill Emu but he refuses, claiming that dealing with the doctor is something he must do himself. After taking Emu to a park, Parado reveals that he is actually the Bugster who infected his body, and both were separated during the operation performed by Michihiko Zaizen under Kuroto's request. Back at the CR, Hiiro and the others also come to the same conclusion, and Nico realizes that the "M" who defeated her six years ago was actually Parado in Emu's body. She concludes that she was wrong for blaming Emu, but is still determined to take back at Parado. Meanwhile, Parado possesses Emu and both transform into Ex-Aid Double Action Gamer, with Parado possessing the R side and demanding Emu, residing on the L side, to fight him, but he refuses. When Hiiro and Taiga arrive to help, Parado also reveals that he once saved his body when he was about to be killed by the virus by possessing him. Emu then decides to fight Parado and attacks him with the Gashacon Key Slasher charged with the Maximum Mighty X Gashat. However, Parado reveals that the attack imprinted Emu's DNA in him, allowing him to use Kuroto's Gamer Driver to transform into Kamen Rider Para-DX Perfect Knock Out Gamer Level 99. In his new form, Para-DX easily overpowers Brave and Snipe in their Level 50 forms and defeats Ex-Aid in his Level 99 form. When the others attempt to escape with Emu, Parado instead possesses his body and leaves with him. Meanwhile, Poppy, guided by the memories of the woman she infected who somehow met Kuroto, arrives at his old office, and finds a hidden Gamer Driver and a Proto Mighty Action X Gashat with different colors.
30	"Strongest vs. Strongest!"; Transliteration: "Saikyō Bāsasu Saikyō!" (Japanese: 最強VS最強！)	Kyohei Yamaguchi	May 7, 2017
Parado still has Emu under his control, and is trying to force him to fight him properly. Meanwhile, the CR Team are still reeling from their defeat. Poppy brings in the box she found and shows her discovery: a 6th Gamer Driver, a variant of Proto Mighty Action X, coloured black rather than purple and the Level 0 Manual, which explains the "Origin Gashat" can suppress the Bugster Virus, meaning they might be able to separate Emu and Parado. However, because it likely came before the other Proto Gashats, its power is too dangerous and uncontrollable. They then go to rescue a patient: a Ride-Player fighting Motors. Poppy and Nico transform and drive Motors off, but because he used the Kamen Rider Chronicle Gashat, he is infected. Emu then arrives, claiming to have escaped, but Taiga quickly realises that it is really Parado controlling him. Separating and transforming to Perfect Knock Out Gamer, Parado attacks the four. He has realised that Emu will not fight him seriously to save his own life, but will to save someone else's. Saying his goodbyes, Emu and Parado leave to find a suitable location for their showdown. Admiring his bravery and professionalism to operate by himself, Taiga and Hiiro agree the best thing they can all do, rather than interfere, is to honour Emu's requests of them all. Nico and Taiga go off to clear Kamen Rider Chronicle while Hiiro goes to fight Motors and save the patient. Poppy decides to "do what she must" and tries to use the Proto Mighty Action X Origin Gashat. However, it will not activate beyond the loading screen behind her, so she enters it. After fleeing some grunt Bugsters, she finds one which is different. Parado has taken Emu to the ruins of the Next Genome Research Institute – the place where they were separated six years earlier. Para-DX knocks Ex-Aid out of transformation and gloats that he is the true Genius Gamer M, the original that made his reputation, and the original cannot be defeated. But before he can finish him, Hiiro, Taiga and Nico arrive, having all realised in their own way that they all need to defeat Parado to save the world. But the level gap is to great, and they are knocked away. Para-DX moves in for the kill, only to be blasted from behind. Everyone looks and, to their horror, see a familiar sight: the Black Ex-Aid. Poppy introduces it as Kamen Rider Genm Level 0, and to everyone;s shock, the voice is that of Kuroto Dan. Parado is driven off and tries to take over Emu again, but cannot, as Level 0 nullifies Bugster abilities on the Game Area. So Parado leaves alone. Back at CR, Poppy explains the unusual Bugster she found was Kuroto Dan's body hidden in the game, and, by equipping it with the 6th Gamer Driver and the Gashat, she uploaded his consciousness. This means that Kuroto Dan has succeeded in bridging the gap to immortality, and has been resurrected as a Bugster.
31	"The Forbidden Continue!?"; Transliteration: "Kindan no Kontinyū!?" (Japanese: 禁断のContinue!?)	Kazuya Kamihoriuchi	May 14, 2017
Kuroto Dan has cheated death, and been resurrected as a Bugster with traces of human DNA, making him a compatible user again, though everyone is still shocked and upset over his revival. Poppy tries to convince them they need his help, but they do not listen, and explains she only brought him back to help free Emu from Parado's control. Emu is angry at Kuroto's lack of care over the lives lost in the name of Kamen Rider Chronicle, though Kuroto quips that the "data" is not gone. They then get word of a new Bugster and prepare to leave, with Hiiro staying behind due to having an operation to perform. However, he secretly leaves the hospital by a different door. Emu arrives to find Charlie attacking a woman Ride-Player, but is distracted by Parado's arrival. Poppy unleashed Kuroto from her Gashacon Bugvisor II to help Emu, but he instead attacks Parado. As they fight, Emu manages to draw Charlie away, but before he can end it, Nico and Taiga arrive to stop him, letting Nico make the finishing move to collect the Gashatrophy for Shakariki Sports. Para-DX grabs Genm by the throat, allowing Genm to touch him. Genm's ability to nullify Bugster Virus lowers Para-DX's level by touch, dropping him from Level 99 to Level 75. Para-DX pushes away and gives Genm a game over, laughing as Genm once again fades away. However, to everyone's shock, Kuroto stands behind Para-DX seconds later, alive. He explains his Gashat is the alpha Gashat, the very first one he ever developed, and he gave it the ability to continue, meaning Para-DX only cost him the first of 99 lives. While consoling the patient, who explains she was trying to get her son back, Poppy remembers her life came from Sakurako Dan, Kuroto's mother. Six years ago, she was a terminally ill patient at the hospital, but disappeared with no record of her death. Poppy reveals that Kuroto infected her with the Bugster Virus, and as she died, she gave birth to Poppy. This means that Kuroto only created Kamen Rider Chronicle to preserve his mother;s data and save her life; however, he denies this, saying that he created Kamen Rider Chronicle to preserve his own genius. Emu states he cannot work with someone who does not understand the value of a single life. On the roof, Taiga and Nico confront Hiiro, who they realise is hoping to bring his girlfriend back, and had earlier defeated Motors and gained the Bakusou Bike Gashatrophy. Taiga explains that having Kuroto back means they have a better chance at ending the Bugster threat, with Nico showing her collection of seven Gashatrophies. They begin the realise the only way forward is to work together. Parado is found at a dam hustling some Ride-Players, where Genm takes him on. Poppy is angry that he is ignoring her instructions, transforms and uses a finisher on him, knocking him out of transformation. She tells him that thanks to him, she was born and has a life to live, and that, in a way, he is her father. Parado, tired of her helping humans, moves to delete her. At the last second, Kuroto pushes her out of the way and takes the blast himself, using another of his lives. Vowing to protect the life he created, Emu realises that Kuroto is trying to atone for his sins, and though he can never forgive him for his actions, agrees to work together. The two Ex-Aids work together, dragging down Para-DX's level and using a joint finisher to drive him away, with Kuroto reclaiming the Dangerous Zombie Gashat in the process. Back at CR, as a token of good will, Kuroto has presents for everyone. For Emu, the DoReMiFa Beat Gashatrophy for freeing Poppy from her brainwashing, a second Gashat Gear Dual β for Taiga, meaning he and Hiiro have one each, a large lollypop for Nico and for Hiiro, an answer to a question: all the data from people who vanished is stored on the Proto Gashats of the viruses that infected them, meaning, once the game has been won, they could be saved. With the team agreeing to work together, and the first nine Gashatrophies gathered, it is time to move to the high-rank stage.
32	"Judgement Passed!"; Transliteration: "Kudasareta Jajjimento!" (Japanese: 下されたJudgement！)	Kazuya Kamihoriuchi	May 21, 2017
Having been cleared of all charges against him, Masamune Dan is released from prison. Meanwhile, Hiiro learns from Kuroto that all the Proto Gashats were seized by the Ministry of Health, and Saki's data must be stored on Proto Drago Knight Hunter Z. Their conversation is interrupted by news of Parado attacking one of the Ride-Players and Emu and co. rush to rescue him. After a brief skirmish with Parado, Graphite and Lovrica, the doctors discover that the Ride-Player is actually Hiiro's father Haima and bring him back to CR, where they discover that he is infected with Toki Meki Crisis. Haima then confesses that he was playing Kamen Rider Chronicle for Saki's sake and Hiiro asks him to contact the Ministry of Health to give them the Proto Gashats in their possession. At Genm Corp., Masamune confronts Ren and threatens to use the Buggle Driver II on him, but the Bugster reveals that the Driver was created for Busgter use and humans will be infected and killed should they try to use it. Back at the CR, Kuroto reveals that once all thirteen Bugsters are defeated, the final boss of Kamen Rider Chronicle, Gamedeus will appear, and the only one that can defeat it is Kamen Rider Cronus. Despite being unaware of Gamedeus's identity, Parado decides that the time has come to defeat the doctors once and for all, while Haima informs Hiiro that the Proto Gashats were mysteriously stolen from the Ministry of Health. The next day, Emu, Hiiro, Taiga and Kuroto set out to fight Parado, Graphite, and Lovrica in what appears to be the decisive battle. During the fight, Ex-Aid uses his powers to erase the Lovely Girls around Lovrica, rendering vulnerable to Brave's attacks, and just when Nico and Asuna decide to enter the fray, time suddenly stops and shifts to nighttime. Masamune Dan appears before them, revealing that he was the true creator of Kamen Rider Chronicle, having used Parado and Kuroto to complete it while he was in jail. He also reveals that he infected himself with the Bugster virus sixteen years ago in order to achieve the perfect antibody, allowing him to use the Buggle Driver II and transform into Kamen Rider Cronus. The Riders and Bugsters then attack Masamune, who stops time to easily defeat them, and destroy Lovrica for good, rendering him unable to revive and healing Haima in the process. After stating his objective of passing judgment on everyone, Masamune takes his leave.
33	"Company Restructuring!"; Transliteration: "Kanpanī Saihen!" (Japanese: Company再編！)	Naoki Tamura	May 28, 2017
As the members of CR discuss the recent developments, Parado is unexpectedly shaken with the fact that Bugsters can be killed for good. Masamune appears before them, claiming that he wishes them no harm, but views them as precious products that take part in Kamen Rider Chronicle, and that they must do his bidding if they do not want to suffer the same fate as Lovrica. Some time later, another Ride-Player is being attacked by Salty and Graphite. The doctors appear to fight them, when Kamen Rider Cronus appears and freezes time around them with his Buggle Driver II's "pause" function. When time resumes, Emu and the others realize that Hiiro is missing. Away from the others, Masamune offers Hiiro a proposal to join his side. While Emu tries to treat the Ride-Player they rescued, Hiiro reappears and informs the others that Masamune has stolen the Proto Gashats that were in possession of the Ministry of Health. Emu then decides to talk directly with Masamune to dissuade him, but fails. Emu also learns from him that he intends to distribute Kamen Rider Chronicle worldwide and as a token of good will, erases Salty from the game's programming, effectively killing him while healing the patient they had just rescued. Back at the CR, Emu and Kuroto devise a plan to defeat Cronus despite his ability to pause. Kuroto then meets his father to confront him, with Parado and Graphite watching at the sidelines, but is easily defeated. Emu and Hiiro arrive to confront Cronus in sequence, and when he pauses, Kuroto emerges from his Buggle Driver II and reveals that he hid himself there, as the pause function affects everything except its user. After unpausing, Kuroto holds his father for Emu to rewrite his DNA, but Hiiro stops him. Masamune then reveals that Hiiro is now his ally and both leave together, much to Emu's astonishment, while Parado regains his composure after having an idea.
34	"Accomplished Rebirth!"; Transliteration: "Hatasareshi Ribāsu!" (Japanese: 果たされしrebirth！)	Naoki Tamura	June 4, 2017
Still astonished by Hiiro's betrayal, the members of the CR conclude that Masamune must be using Saki's data as leverage against him when Parado and Graphite demand Kuroto to reveal more information about Gamedeus. Poppy instead tells them that Gamedeus is Kamen Rider Chronicle, the ultimate boss that is supposed to be defeated by Cronus' power. Realizing that the opposite must also be true, the two Bugsters leave. Meanwhile, Hiiro demands Masamune to liberate Saki as he has already proven his loyalty, but before that, he gives him another task. When Emu and Asuna arrive to rescue a patient infected with Gekitotsu Robots, Brave appears to defeat Ex-Aid and steal Kiriya's Gamer Driver in his possession. Before leaving, Hiiro apologizes to Taiga for blaming him for Saki's fate and states that he must restore her, even if he is banned from being a Kamen Rider or a doctor. Meanwhile, Parado and Graphite encounter Gamedeus in the Game World and obtains a sample of it. Graphite volunteers to test the sample in his body and is surprised by its power. The two then turn to Emu, asking for his cooperation against Hiiro and Masamune, but he refuses. However, Kuroto restores Emu's old Gamer Driver for him and continues with his work on a new Gashat to fight Cronus. Meanwhile, Masamune restores Saki's body from the Proto Drago Knight Hunter Z as promised, but Hiiro realizes that she lacks her memories. Masamune claims that he will do so once Hiiro works for him more, and to prove that he can do it, he brings back another person. At his hospital, Taiga confesses to Nico that it was his intention to have Hiiro blaming him for what happened to Saki for his sake. When Emu returns to confront Gatton and save the patient, Hiiro appears once again to stop him, but this time, Emu fights back and defeats him, destroying Gatton in the process. Parado and Graphite uses Gamedeus' sample to negate Cronus' pause function when Kamen Rider Lazer Turbo arrives and erases the sample with his Level 0 ability, allowing Masamune to pause and singlehandedly defeat Parado, Graphite and Emu. Emu then becomes surprised upon knowing that Kiriya has returned.
35	"Rescue the Partner!"; Transliteration: "Pātonā o Kyūshutsu seyo!" (Japanese: Partnerを救出せよ！)	Kyohei Yamaguchi	June 11, 2017
Dissatisfied with the current user base of Kamen Rider Chronicle, Masamune confides to Hiiro his intention to take control of the lives of the players in order to render the practice of clinical medicine obsolete and take over the world. Meanwhile at CR, Emu refuses to believe that the Kamen Rider Lazer who is working with Cronus is Kiriya, before he, Kuroto and Asuna are dispatched to help a Ride-Player fighting Alhambra. In the occasion, they meet Kamen Rider Lazer Turbo again, who reveals himself to be Kiriya and that Kamen Rider Chronicle changed the rules of life to the point that doctors will not be needed anymore before leaving. As Graphite suffers from the multiplication of the Gamedeus virus in his body, Parado approaches Emu, asking for his cooperation in deleting Kiriya so that they can defeat Cronus. However, Emu refuses him again, claiming that he still has not learned the value of people's lives even after losing Lovrica. Back at CR, Emu concludes that Kiriya must have his mind reprogrammed to do Masamune's bidding and they form a plan to bring him back. Upon fighting Alhambra and Kiriya again, Emu's plans to reprogram Kiriya are hindered by Cronus' appearance, but Taiga and Nico appear and distract him, allowing Ex-Aid to defeat Alhambra and use the reprogramming on Kiriya. However, Kiriya reveals that he was not reprogrammed and is working with Masamune out of his own volition. Claiming that Emu betrayed his expectatives upon failing to stop the Bugsters and the advent of Kamen Rider Chronicle, Kiriya attacks him while whispering something to him that enrages him. After leaving with Kiriya, Masamune approaches Hiiro and orders him to defeat Emu for good in exchange to fully restore Saki, entrusting him with the Taddle Legacy Gashat, while Kuroto rejoices upon completing his masterpiece, the Hyper Muteki Gashat.
36	"Perfect Invincible Gamer!"; Transliteration: "Kanzen Muteki no Gēmā!" (Japanese: 完全無敵のGAMER！)	Kyohei Yamaguchi	June 25, 2017
Genm Corp. announces a special event where players will have the chance to fight Kamen Rider Cronus and obtain the power to complete Kamen Rider Chronicle and revive =the lost players. Eager to stop Masamune's new scheme, Kuroto gives Emu the Hyper Muteki Gashat. Less than two hours before the event begins, Emu, Kuroto and Taiga arrive to face Cronus, accompanied by Hiiro and Kiriya. Hiiro attempts to use the Taddle Legacy Gashat, but fails, and Masamune claims that it must be because he still lacks the resolve to do so. Hiiro than fights using Taddle Fantasy instead. During the fight, when Cronus is about to pause, Ex-Aid attempts to use the Hyper Muteki Gashat, but also fails and Genm uses it instead to break through Cronus' pause and fight him. However, Genm's invincibility lasts only for ten seconds and he is easily defeated, with Hyper Muteki stolen. Back to the CR, Kuroto concludes that Emu did not manage to use Hyper Muteki, as his "M" personality was deleted when he reprogrammed Parado. Meanwhile, Masamune confides to Kiriya that the event is a trap to defeat and increase the number of players in his custody to bolster Kamen Rider Chronicle's popularity, and as a reward for his services, awards him with the Proto Giri Giri Chambara Gashat. Kiriya then asks for the Hyper Muteki Gashat as a reward should he defeat Ex-Aid. At Emu's request, Asuna calls for Parado and Emu asks for his collaboration by entering into Poppy's Gashacon Bugvisor II and wait for Cronus to pause in order to catch him by surprise, just as Kuroto did once, to which he agrees. As the event begins and players gather to fight Cronus, Emu and his friends appear to fight him and Lazer Turbo. Lazer Turbo defeats Ex-Aid and Cronus grants him the Hyper Muteki Gashat as promised, when Emu, instead of sending Parado to Cronus' Driver as they planned, uses the Gashacon Bugvisor to infuse him into his body and reclaim his "M" personality. Kiriya then reveals that he was not by Masamune's side and was waiting for the right chance to betray him. He gives the Hyper Muteki Gashat to Emu, who transforms into his ultimate form, Muteki Gamer, and defeats Cronus with his unlimited invincibility. As Masamune escapes, Parado emerges from Emu's body and commends him for his deception, as he believes things will be more interesting now. Back at CR, Kiriya reveals that he stole the other Proto Gashats from Masamune, and despite resenting Kuroto for killing him, accepts Emu's judgement of having him around. Meanwhile, an enraged Masamune orders Hiiro to destroy Emu once and for all, threatening to delete Saki's data for good should he refuse.
37	"Resolution of the White Knight!"; Transliteration: "Howaito Naito no Kakugo!" (Japanese: White knightの覚悟！)	Satoshi Morota	July 2, 2017
Hiiro is astonished with Masamune's demand to destroy Emu, but Masamune comes up with another idea; to destroy Parado instead and cure Emu of his game disease, thus rendering him unable to transform into a Kamen Rider anymore. Meanwhile, Kazuo Momose, Saki's father, is admitted into the CR after getting himself infected with Kaiden while using Kamen Rider Chronicle in an attempt to rescue his daughter. As Emu is about to confront Kaiden, Parado appears to challenge him, but Hiiro arrives as well, this time succeeding in using Taddle Legacy to transform into Kamen Rider Brave Legacy Gamer Level 100. As Ex-Aid Muteki Gamer destroys Kaiden, Brave overpowers Para-DX, but just when he is about to destroy him for good, Nico intervenes, wanting to deal the final blow in order to have her revenge, but giving Parado the chance to flee instead. Back at CR, Kazuo is discharged after being healed, but confides in Emu and Haima that Hiiro should forget about Saki and move forward for her sake. Soon after, Kiriya and Poppy return from the Game World and reveal that the data of the defeated players contained in the Proto Gashats is strongly encrypted, and can be accessed only with the master version of the Kamen Rider Chronicle Gashat in Masamune's possession. Emu then decides to confront Masamune to retrieve it, accompanied by them. Meanwhile, Hiiro is approached by Parado and Graphite, who decided to face him together, and Taiga arrives to confront Graphite, leaving Hiiro to face Parado himself. However, when he is confronted by Ex-Aid, Lazer Turbo and Poppy, Cronus reveals his plan to them, and they decide to rush after Hiiro instead. Taiga is defeated by Graphite, but he refuses to give up, and is critically injured, leading Hiiro to stop fighting and give the Bugsters the chance to escape. Emu, Kiriya and Asuna arrive soon after to take the critically injured Taiga to be treated, as a disoriented Hiiro also leaves the scene.
38	"Period With Tears"; Transliteration: "Namida no Piriodo" (Japanese: 涙のperiod)	Satoshi Morota	July 9, 2017
Taiga is brought to the hospital in critical condition, with the doctors concluding that only Hiiro can successfully operate on him. Haima calls for him on phone to perform the operation, but Masamune cuts off their conversation. Just when Nico and the others are about to lose hope, Hiiro appears to operate on Taiga. Meanwhile, Masamune attacks Parado and Graphite to dispose of them, when Graphite uses Gamedeus' virus to disable his pause function, but Cronus then uses his ability to freely use Energy Items to defeat them. Kuroto and Kiriya appear to help them escape, but Masamune reveals that he ordered Hiiro to sabotage the operation and kill Taiga, threatening to delete Saki's data should he refuse. Kuroto then keeps Masamune occupied to allow Kiriya to warn the others. Upon hearing about Hiiro's deal with Masamune, Nico panics, but Haima and the others calm her down, claiming that they believe in him. Upon hearing of the situation, Emu leaves the operation room and confronts Masamune himself, allowing Kuroto to retreat after losing more than 20 of his continues against his father. Using Saki's data as leverage, Masamune forbids Emu from transforming and starts beating him until Hiiro arrives, revealing that he did not kill Taiga as ordered, and Masamune deletes Saki's data. Emu and Hiiro then transform into Ex-Aid Muteki Gamer and Brave Legacy Gamer to easily defeat Cronus, but he flees. Emu then returns to CR while Hiiro stays behind, crying over losing Saki for good. The next day, Taiga awakens, much to everybody's joy, and Hiiro and Taiga set aside their differences and reconcile.
39	"Goodbye Me!"; Transliteration: "Gubbai Ore!" (Japanese: Goodbye俺！)	Kazuya Kamihoriuchi	July 16, 2017
Masamune attacks Parado and Graphite again and during their fight, he discovers that Pause does not work against Graphite thanks to Gamedeus' power. Despite this, Cronus easily defeats the two, but Emu and Asuna appear to protect them. Masamune reveals that he infected Nico with the Gamedeus virus, and the only way to cure her is by defeating Gamedeus himself. However, both Graphite and Parado must be defeated to assemble all Gashatrophies and summon Gamedeus, and if Parado is destroyed, Emu loses his powers. Forced to choose between Nico and Parado, Emu receives the Toki Meki Crisis Gashatrophy from Masamune, who promises to give him the trophy for Perfect Knock Out after disposing of Parado. After leaving, Masamune mocks Parado, claiming that as a video game villain, he was just created with the purpose of being destroyed. Back at his office, Masamune is informed that Johnny Maxima, the CEO of Machina Vision, asked for one Gamer Driver in exchange for their cooperation in manufacturing Kamen Rider Chronicle for worldwide distribution. Meanwhile, at CR, Kuroto claims that, with Nico's data safely stored inside Kamen Rider Chronicle, they should not worry about leaving Nico to die as she can be reborn as a Bugster. However, Emu and the others lash out at him for considering such option. After taking Graphite's Gashacon Bugvisor, Parado sets out to confront Cronus, but Emu meets him first, challenging him to a decisive fight. As Parado is overpowered by Emu, Emu reveals to Parado that his inherent fear of death comes from the time when Emu was infected and nearly died after being involved in a car accident. In the end, Emu destroys Parado and loses the ability to transform into a Kamen Rider, despite Kuroto's protests.
40	"Reboot of Fate!"; Transliteration: "Unmei no Ribūto!" (Japanese: 運命のreboot！)	Kazuya Kamihoriuchi	July 23, 2017
With Emu unable to transform anymore, Hiiro, Taiga, Kiriya and Kuroto set out to confront Masamune. They initially have the upper hand using the Hyper Muteki Gashat, but, fearing that Masamune could steal it from him, Kuroto retreats, allowing Cronus to steal the other three's Gamer Drivers and Gashats before leaving. Meanwhile, Emu confesses to Poppy that, before Parado was destroyed, he absorbed him into his body once more, reviving him successfully using the Mighty Brothers XX Gashat. Still confused, Parado flees and meets Graphite, but Poppy follows him, and states that, despite his claims, he actually looked up to Emu. Meanwhile, Masamune informs Johnny Maxima that he had prepared one Gamer Driver to give him as he asked. Graphite attempts to convince him of the contrary, but he leaves instead and meets Emu. Emu reveals that his intention was to have Parado realize the importance of human life and that he will help him atone for his errors, as they are both parts of the same person. Parado then agrees, and joins forces with Emu to confront Masamune. Together, Ex-Aid and Para-DX not only defeat Cronus, but destroy the master version of the Kamen Rider Chronicle Gashat. However, a furious Masamune triggers the infection in his body and attains a new power, Reset, that not only restores his Gashat, but also erases the Hyper Muteki Gashat from existence.
41	"Reset Game!"; Transliteration: "Risetto Sareta Gēmu!" (Japanese: Resetされたゲーム!)	Kyohei Yamaguchi	July 30, 2017
With the world reset to before Emu received the Hyper Muteki Gashat, the deal between Masamune and Johnny Maxima falls apart as he no longer has a Gamer Driver to provide, Nico was never infected with Gamedeus' virus strain, Kuroto regained most of his lost lives, and the stolen Drivers and Gashats have been returned. Now, only Graphite stands in the way of clearing Kamen Rider Chronicle, and while Hiiro and Taiga are ready for a showdown, Emu, Parado, and Poppy try to get Graphite to join them, as he is the only one who could fight Cronus, but he refuses. Desperate to find a way to counter Cronus' reset function, Kuroto wires Emu up to his computer and has him create new game concepts, using several lives in the process, but none seem to work. Meanwhile, the final fight between Graphite, Brave, and Snipe takes place, before Graphite concedes defeat after the Riders manage to knock him down. As Nico goes to deliver the final blow to earn the Gashatrophy, Cronus, refusing to allow Kamen Rider Chronicle to end, arrives to stop them. However, Graphite is enraged that he refuses to let them win fairly and attacks Cronus to unpause the game, taking Nico's attack and destroying him. With the thirteen Gashatrophies gathered, they are used to access the final level, but Cronus tries to reset the game again. Ex-Aid arrives and uses the new Energy Item "Save" to nullify the reset function, and with the newly modified and re-created the Hyper Muteki Gashat, defeats Cronus. As Gamedeus, the final boss of Kamen Rider Chronicle, arrives, Johnny Maxima sneaks away unnoticed with Graphite's Gashacon Bugvisor.
42	"God Arrives!"; Transliteration: "Goddo Kōrin!" (Japanese: God降臨!)	Kyohei Yamaguchi	August 6, 2017
With the advent of Gamedeus, the Bugster Virus is spreading among the population. The Riders must join forces to defeat him and put an end to Kamen Rider Chronicle.
43	"White Coat License"; Transliteration: "Hakui no Raisensu" (Japanese: 白衣のlicense)	Shojiro Nakazawa	August 13, 2017
Absorbing Gamedeus to become Gamedeus Cronus, Masamune targets Nico and tempts her into using the Kamen Rider Chronicle Gashat to enter the Game World. The Kamen Riders attempt to stop him, but are powerless before the combined powers of Cronus and Gamedeus.
44	"The Last Smile"; Transliteration: "Saigo no Sumairu" (Japanese: 最期のsmile)	Shojiro Nakazawa	August 20, 2017
Gamedeus Cronus evolves into his ultimate form and starts a pandemic. To stop him once and for all, Poppy and Parado come up with a desperate plan.
45 (Finale)	"Endless Game"; Transliteration: "Owarinaki Gēmu" (Japanese: 終わりなきGAME)	Shojiro Nakazawa	August 27, 2017
Though Gamedeus is destroyed, Emu cannot transform into Ex-Aid Muteki Gamer anymore now that Parado is gone. Masamune capitalizes on this by overwhelming the other Riders before freezing time to take his leisure in killing Emu first. Emu manages to overcome the time freeze and heavily damages Masamune's Bugvisor to restore the flow of time before joining the Kamen Riders in defeating Cronos. However, Masamune refuses to accept his death as he reinserts his Kamen Rider Chronicle Gashat into his Bugvisor, which exposes him to a lethal virus that destroys him along with his knowledge on how to restore the Game Disease victims. Later, with Genm Corp. now under Tsukuru Koboshi, who gives the CR the Proto Gashats, a press conference is held to assure the public that the Bugster epidemic has been resolved. However, Emu, still dealing with the loss of Poppy and Parado, explains that the CR will now attempt to find a way to restore those who died from the Game Disease. Some time later, after examining a patient, Emu learns that Kuroto restored Poppy from the fragment of data he obtained from her demise. He also learns that a fragment of Parado entered his body, allowing him to reconstitute the Bugster. Emu, glad to see his Bugster friends again, soon gets a call.
