= List of I Can See Your Voice (Philippine game show) season 1 episodes =

Television game show season list

The first season of the Philippine television mystery music game show I Can See Your Voice premiered on ABS-CBN on September 16, 2017 and ended on January 6, 2019. It is also the longest-running season in ICSYV franchise by episode count, with 128. (Note: The 1st season has originally scheduled to air for 26 episodes (at 13 weeks), with Moira Dela Torre playing on its tentative [26th episode] finale on December 10, 2017. Due to "unprecedented high ratings", it was later added by 102 episodes (at 54 weeks) until the formal conclusion on January 6, 2019.) This article is a list of episodes that the program had aired, as well as most details about each episode.

== Episodes ==
Legend:
Good singer
Bad singer

=== 2017 ===
Episode		Guest artist (Note: Players' notes: For the returning guest artists (who also include foreigners and former good singers), names are displayed in italics.; For the mixed groups, names who identified as bad singers are displayed in italics.)	SEE-cret songers (In their respective numbers and aliases)					
#	Date	Guest artist	Elimination order					Winner
#	Date	Guest artist	Stop, Looks and Listen	The Voice is Syncing		I Like to Prove It! Prove It!		Winner
1	September 16, 2017	Gary Valenciano	5. JC Flores; (Mensa-hero)	2. Joshua Talusig; (Nyoy Gising!)	6. Kane Carandang; (Triple Treat)	1. Guil Sanchez; (OK Pines, Whatever)	4. Andrei Osano; (Tiyaga Teatro)	3. Christian Tugado; Ma-bandang Buhay
2	September 17, 2017	Ogie Alcasid	2. Michelle Kholoma; (La Luma Song-re)	5. Diane Griar; (Momnime)	4. Ericka Jacinto; (Ma Ma Ma My Sharonian)	1. Vincent Corsanes; (Gitara Geronimo)	6. JP Soliva; (Bulgogi Alcasid)	3. Jerson Balabat; Train to Bosesan
3	September 23, 2017	Lea Salonga	5. Honey Grace Salvador; (Hair Majesty)	4. JR Nobleza; (Teen King Out Loud)	6. Rachel Anne Figueroa; (Hello Katy)	3. John Raymundo; (Rock-a-bae)	1. Rossini Mae Navarro; (Inay Will Always Love You)	2. MJ Cayabyab; Be My Best Friend
4	September 24, 2017	Lani Misalucha	4. Ken Gonzales; (Dasma Boy!)	3. Neo Domingo; (Apo-gi Mo Naman!)	1. Dexter Lopez; (Dance-former)	5. Robert Barretto; (DJ Chop-chop)	2. Sarita Janapin; (Asia's Inay-tingale)	6. Yunan Ramos; Funny Batungbakal
5	September 30, 2017	Randy Santiago	2. Aeldred Burgos; (Rayver 'Cuz)	1. Hazel Cruz; (Ukay Na Me)	5. Rodney Arriesgado; (Gold Pedalist)	6. Francis Lituania; (Tutor Consequence)	3. Tonton Leonando; (Graba Siya Oh!)	4. Szai Apostol; Through the Choir
6	October 1, 2017	Jolina Magdangal	1. Ken Tuanio; (Mestizo Cruz III)	5. Billy Gandoza; (Condo Patola)	2. Julian Nicholas Viñeza; (Chuva Crew-crew)	4. Jane Geocadin; (Remember My Name, Game!)	6. Harold Estampador; (Harry Supporter)	3. Lovely Joy Corpuz; Fight Attendant
7	October 7, 2017	Martin Nievera	2. Sonx Estrella; (Leader Big Shot)	1. Aura Balington; (If the Giling is Gone)	4. Jayshie Aya; (Boom Pa-nurse)	5. Ian Placio; (And Now the Engineer...)	3. Janjay Coquilla; (I Can See Your Boss)	6. Agnes Jolo; Guro Old With You
8	October 8, 2017	Yeng Constantino	6. Jenna Roque; (Sa Hiphop at Ligaya)	5. Jay Estrella; (Wild Fellower)	1. Rem Mutoc; (It’s Shy-time)	4. Edgardo Tejada; (Dad’s Entertainment)	3. Steven Fermin; (Where Isla Love?)	2. Joyce Macapagal; When USA Nothing at All
9	October 14, 2017	Jessa Zaragoza	2. Marvin Nazzaro; (I Sing Dead People)	5. Rodmar Carreon; (Roving Padilla)	6. Sephy Francisco; (Tigil Patrol)	3. Katrina Pastor; (Promo-donna)	1. Efren Memije; (Tahi Na Me)	4. Nicole Parada; Ready, Headset, Go
10	October 15, 2017	Zsa Zsa Padilla	6. Lira Layron; (Curl, Boy, Bakla, Tomboy)	2. Roi Alvarez; (Hilot-hilot Lang)	4. Sheena Ching; (Daughter Ocampo)	3. Beth Callanta; (Kuh Loud-esma)	1. Charles Rodriguez; (May Balat sa Pet)	5. Marjorie Balasabas; Clothes Open
11	October 21, 2017	Jed Madela	2. Jovert Leovido; (Door-an Door-an)	3. Danielle Reyes; (Chinoy Boyband Superstar)	6. Roselle Bautista; (Gi-gig si Acoe)	4. John Lee Diaz; (Kimchi Nadal)	5. Jen Reyes; (Extra-si Extra-no)	1. Erwin Madrona; I Saw Design
12	October 22, 2017	Eva Eugenio	6. Ramil Permigones; (Cup Model)	1. Cha Perez; (Dance-sing Queen)	4. Rye Real; (Lako sa Layaw)	2. Jerwin Nicomedez; (Go Go Power Arranger)	3. Shen Apillado; (Meal or No Meal?)	5. Kristel Jumayao; A-naks Naman!
13	October 28, 2017	Jake Zyrus	5. Mc Lym Amansec; (Tupok Too Furious)	4. Jocel Salavaria; (Video Karir-ra)	6. Jaika Ricote; (Tina Planner)	3. Mavel Bernadez; (Raket Labis Kitang Mahal)	2. Ryan Tamondong; (Shy-yang na Shy-yang Talaga)	1. Sidony Calleja; The Mommy Returns
14	October 29, 2017	Mike Hanopol (Juan de la Cruz Band)	1. Diane Ting; (Lemon Akong Ano?!)	2. Lorelie Floren; (Asya Pero 'di Kinaya)	5. Julie Grace Mateo; (Ate Guide)	6. Erickson Agco; (Maki Manzano)	4. Jenika Louisse Duran; (In Fair-nurse)	3. Christian Grey; Net Pangan
15	November 4, 2017	APO Hiking Society (Note: Season highlights: APO Hiking Society (ep. 15) designated as a group, in which different members playing on subsequent games are actually returned; Danny Javier, Boboy Garrovillo, and Jim Paredes have been played.; Freestyle designated as a group, in which different members playing on subsequent games are actually returned; Top Suzara and Jinky Vidal have been played.)	1. Hannah Joy Wenceslao; (Pray Valera)	5. Jayson Gigantone; (Interior de Singer)	3. Celine Orbillo; (Mic Puhunan)	4. Mico Acedera; (Wacky Kilay)	2. SSG Bonito Lamdag; (Do Re Mi Fa Soldier)	6. Will Castro; Do You Wanna Know a Circuit?
16	November 5, 2017	KZ Tandingan	1. Alex Custodio; (Menu Po)	2. Elben Digamon; (Band-nana Sundae)	4. Angelique Chua; (Beijing, the Mother of a Lost Boy)	6. Amuel Banta; (Kahit Contest Pagtingin)	3. Rospel Gonzales; (Stage Doesn't Matter)	5. Mara Santos; Baby Shark Dutdut Dutdut
17	November 11, 2017	Nina	2. Sarrah Costan; (Divide Diva)	1. Echo Ayco; ('Di Volley na Lang)	5. Dexter Aala; (Only Tinda Philippines)	4. Hyde Termeteet; (Gerald Dancer-son)	3. Vanessa Celestial; (Bruno March)	6. Vilmark Viray; Adam Libing
18	November 12, 2017	Jaya	3. Kristel Estepa; (All Out of Lounge)	5. MJ Balingit; (Piano Na Kaya)	6. Francis Madronero; (No to Violins)	1. Zandra Duritan; (Blog Beauty)	2. Julie Bongcales; (A-yaya Pag-ibig)	4. John Robert Angeles; Son ka Man Naroroon
19	November 18, 2017	Toni Gonzaga	1. Jason Paver; (Alok-alike)	6. Hank Galvez; (The Food Son)	4. Gioanna Martin; (Liza Soprano)	2. Janus Guevara; (Unli Calls and Techs)	5. Che Aleshire; (Hiking ka na Lang)	3. Camille Peñaverde; Kopya, Mani, Popcorn
20	November 19, 2017	Erik Santos	2. Mark Lester Rait; (Bi-cool Express)	4. Jessa Santos; (Emo Magalona)	1. Mike Ediezca; (Photo't Kutsinta)	5. Eevan "DJ Lyka" Salazar; (How DJ Know?)	6. Lynlyn Rodrigo; (And They Call it Papel Love)	3. Joshua Talaue; Enrique Heal
21	November 25, 2017	Angeline Quinto	2. May Masculino; (Serbedora Aunor)	3. Jam Ocampo; (Gym Keri)	4. Jazper Tiongson; (Host Sweetie Host)	6. Myka Cloma; (Brush-ta't Kasama Kita)	1. Annabelle Jimenez; (Single Bells)	5. Allan Ang; Becky Nemen!
22	November 26, 2017	Dingdong Avanzado	2. Arvin Cahipo; (King and Queen of Carts)	1. Jovie Boiser; (Karao-king)	5. Ana Marie Alforte; (Ramen Talent)	4. RG Mia; (Sport Santiago)	6. Coleen Dela Paz; (Anna Veggie)	3. Mike Arabia; Martin Nie-pera
23	December 2, 2017	Karla Estrada	6. Alcor Pilapil; (Star for All Scissors)	1. Jhay Buenaflor; (Jack Empoy)	4. Haiza Madrid; (Ver-sexy on the Floor)	5. Richard Manuel; (Shake Daddy Daddy Dancer)	3. Erika Buensuceso; (Miss Uni-verse, Refrain, Chorus)	2. Myka Basco; Sis is the Moment
24	December 3, 2017	Richard Poon	6. Coleen de Guzman; (Gandang Gabi Voice)	1. Grace Olea; (I-chef I-chef Muna)	5. Trojan Earl Lim; (Legally Blend)	2. Nelson Perez; (Jeep of Staff)	4. Ana Katrina Merro; (Korea Sanchez)	3. Love Joy Javier; Eh Cashier Bata!
25	December 9, 2017	Jamie Rivera	6. Danilo Correche; (Moves Like Bagger)	3. Jeff Alagar Jr.; (Brad Fit)	2. Jake Martinez; (Piano Gibbs)	4. Marjorie Lojo; (Promo Distance)	5. Marianne Manliclic; (A Law and Lasting Love)	1. Mary Jane Jaldo; Wash me Whip, Wash me Nae Nae
26	December 10, 2017	Moira Dela Torre	6. Eunice Pajantoy; (Kath-run Bernardo)	3. Oreo Orio; (Bawal na Pag-bibig)	1. Christopher Sarez; (Regal Soccer)	5. Mae Quisel; (Nekememetey na Lesson)	4. Niell Mariano; (Lord Kagawad)	2. Emily Peralta; Mommy Mong Alam
Season break: December 16 and 17 episodes were pre-empted to give way for the airing of Just Love: 2017 ABS-CBN Christmas Special.
27	December 23, 2017	Vice Ganda	1. Michael Hermogenes; (Bike Test, Bike Test)	2. Jes Cabral; (Pulis Don't Ask Me)	3. Malvin Gacutan; (Book Car-a-karaka)	4. Giovanni Guillermo; (Muay Thai, Bakit N'yo Ako Iniwan?)	6. Herbie Pultan; (Scoops Kirri Scoops)	5. John Andrew Manzano; I'm Ballin' For You
28	December 24, 2017	Jett Pangan (The Dawn)	5. Marvin Petros; (Humanap ka ng Bonnet)	4. Keith Tobias; (I Should be Lalaki)	1. Nics Maggay; (38, 39, Sporty)	2. Vic Pingca, Jr.; (Barko Sison)	3. Joyce Tarray; (Buy and Sail)	6. JC Pagtalunan; Wake me Up Before You Coco
29	December 30, 2017	Kyla	1. Ella Leyson; (Beauty-ball Girl)	3. Manuel Dula, Jr.; (Paypay Rizal)	5. Kayette Gatchalian; (Crinkle, Crinkle, Little Star)	4. Daryl Reynes; (Do You Hair What I Hair?)	6. Manuel Horca; (Steel I Met You)	2. Alex Francisco; Tina Tourner
30	December 31, 2017	Jenine Desiderio	1. Encel Mena; (Cook Ako na Lang Sana)	2. Patricia Rodriguez; (I'm a Serve-vivor)	5. Czarina Sarmiento; (Himig Hotdog)	6. Ronald Cadiz; (Wag Kang Gamot)	4. Kim Etulle; (Bongga ka Dine)	3. Zenaida Bustos; Mumu Dionesia

=== 2018 and 2019 ===
Episode		Guest artist	SEE-cret songers (In their respective numbers and aliases)					
#	Date	Guest artist	Elimination order					Winner
#	Date	Guest artist	Stop, Looks and Listen	The Voice is Syncing		I Like To Prove It! Prove It!/Play it by Hear		Winner
31	January 6, 2018	Roselle Nava	5. Arman Amarillo; (Liars Go to Health)	2. Welmar dela Cruz; (See You Letter)	3. Rose Marie Magpantay; (Gretchen Ba-retro)	4. Rinz Geraldez; (Send in the Crowns)	1. Abby Canaria; (Anyeong Petsa Na?)	6. Roniel Mendoza; F.A. Sing You a Love Song
32	January 7, 2018	Ito Rapadas (Neocolours)	6. Love Diaz; (Curly Shells)	2. Edrick Velasco; (Mr. Mahiyain)	1. Rona Mae Mahinay; (Goat Buster)	3. Bernie Asperin; (Julius Davao)	4. Jeziel Calma; (Prito Pimentel)	5. Aljon Gaza; Boundary-to, Banda Roon
33	January 13, 2018	Frenchie Dy	2. Kevin Carl Marquez; (Juan Ta-med)	5. Romar Jhon Roque; (Archie Muñoz)	1. Odessa España; (Vocal sa Kalooban)	6. Arze Pallarco; (Take Care Kiosk I Care)	4. Isay Subarba; (Wag mo Akong Ma-secretary Terry)	3. Arvin John Miranda; Cover my Dead Body
34	January 14, 2018	Alex Gonzaga	6. Veronica Malabanan; (Pulis Lonely People in the World)	5. Mark Anthony Escano; (Bukid ba Ganyan?)	3. Kenneth Asis; (Volts 5)	1. Jamie Morales; (Bride Chicken)	2. Ken San Miguel; (Sell me When It Hurts)	4. Fe Lontabo; Isang Librong Pag-ibig
35	January 20, 2018	Juris	5. Jon Racimo; (Spa Takraw)	3. April Garcia; (Larawang Kumpas)	1. Vince Rodriguez; (Sobre ka Naman)	6. James Estropia; (Tint Eastwood)	4. Daday Decena; (Street to the Point)	2. Beng Lopez; Mukha Like This
36	January 21, 2018	James Reid	3. Jessa Laude; (Help Help Hooray!)	2. Sha-sha Buenaventura; (Alex Gon-sana)	6. Jancel Trono; (Daddy Concepcion)	1. CJ Peralta; (Tats What Friends Are For)	5. Danilo Cap-atan; (Quarry V.)	4. Trixie Shane Maningding; Wala Nang Iibigin Pang Diva
37	January 27, 2018	Morissette	5. Joshua Salas; (Mechanic Ka Pa Sa Labi)	2. Duane David; (First Come, First Curve)	6. Erwin Ruetas; (Rico Bangko)	1. Isko Labrillazo; (Barong Long Time Ago...)	3. Alexie Rose La Madrid; (Ang Babae sa Benta-na)	4. Jake Portugal; Uncle-ling Galing Mong Sumayaw
38	January 28, 2018	Billy Crawford	2. Jaja Alueta; (Lodi Sta. Maria)	1. Rem Lajarca; (Vest in Talent)	6. Will Aputi; (Sash Aguas)	5. Smile Empleo; (Cleaning me Softly)	4. Sahlee Velasco; (My Eggs and Whys)	3. Ramel Awi; Zumbang Preso
39	February 3, 2018	Richard Yap	2. Francis Acosta, Jr.; (Cargo Versoza)	1. Christine Lo-on; (Gas the Way Aha Aha I Like It)	4. Jade Pinca; (It's a Tay!)	3. Rhein Caunceran; (Tokyo't Baboy)	6. Lei Panajon; (Sorry-sorry Store)	5. Ernest Albarida; To the Ref, To the Ref
40	February 4, 2018	Claire dela Fuente	3. Joy Gervacio; (Siyanse Supsup)	2. Yahweeh Ravina; (Malalim ang Inii-chip)	4. Joniel Anico; (Kung Maibabalik Kalan)	1. Joymayca Abadiez; (Braid of Chucky)	6. Rene Antonio; (Folk-er Face)	5. Manuel Macapugay, Jr.; Math Ranillo III
41	February 10, 2018	Jona Viray	5. Jelly Bangadon; (May Polish sa Ilalim ng Tulay)	1. Yom Lallana; (Got to Bili in Magic)	6. Ryan Galvez; (Chat's my Boy!)	4. Roma Princena; (The One Dagat Away)	2. Yangyang Gonzales; (A B Kiddie E F G)	3. Clary Mangaring; Granny Misalucha
42	February 11, 2018	Piolo Pascual	4. Arriane Nuñez; (What's Shop, Madlang People?)	2. Leonor Vizoro; (Mommy Perez)	5. AJ Peralta; (Maputi pa Sila)	1. Piolo Visda; (P. Yolo Pascual)	6. Minette Infante; (Teeth me Baby One More Time)	3. Andrea Montealto; Vlogging Naroon Ka
43	February 17, 2018	Salbakuta	5. Vane Mendoza; (P.E. Wurtzbach)	3. Haidee Urtal; (Hose That Girl?)	6. Anj Prieto; (Fan-geline Quinto)	2. Jun Janapin; (Please Lang, Ayoko ng Gulong)	4. Bop Roa; (Naipit Ako sa Graphic)	1. Kyran Oliver; Italian, Baka Makawala
44	February 18, 2018	Vina Morales	4. AJ Almonte; (E.R. E.R. Oh!)	1. Dodong Purgatorio, Jr.; (Taho New World)	2. Nicah Saberon; (Ahas is Not a Home)	3. Cathy Loayon; (Gulong and Winding Road)	5. Jerrod Rivera; (Chem You Feel the Love Tonight?)	6. Belle Hernandez; Free-tong Hotdog
45	February 24, 2018	Iñigo Pascual	1. Ian Etcobañez; (Sinetch I-teach?)	6. John Ryan Magalona; (Jams Reid)	3. Mary Rose Apaya; (Laguna Matata)	2. Lyn Eguia; (Arjo A-tidy)	4. Charles Boricano; (Son Ka Pa?)	5. Patricia Ivy Peñano; Baa Baa Black Shift
46	February 25, 2018	Jay R	1. MC Corpuz; (Plant Curtis)	2. Rustom Cister; (Who Cars?)	4. Christyne Garcia; (Gold me Maybe)	5. Yhiel Madula; (Cheering the Night Together)	3. Tawin Ybañez; (Tuloy Marine ang Awit ng Buhay Ko)	6. Andrew dela Cruz; Tirik Santos
47	March 3, 2018	Gino Padilla	2. SNI Genebeth C. Amato, M.D.; (Navy This Time)	1. Rene Ellazar; (Guess Abelgas)	4. Marion Angelo Lozano; (Inom Raymundo)	5. Elay Tolentino; (Choose ko 'Day!)	3. Lovely Flores; (Single Pay-rent)	6. Elvin Astillero; Starting Order Again
48	March 4, 2018	Darren Espanto	5. Jackie Conchada; (Taylor Sweep)	2. Tantan Castro; (Bise As a Bee)	4. Jerson Tecson; (Get the Patty Started)	6. Korina Omega; (Kuya Ko na Lang Sana)	3. Tofu Sibug; (Kape-Paste)	1. Ella Joy de Guzman; Past Sis Past
49	March 10, 2018	Jovit Baldivino	3. Blue Lualhati; (Edit Wow)	1. Reyven Martinez, Jr.; (Tamis ng Unan Halik)	2. Paloma Machado; (Anong Wacky mo sa Long Hair Ko)	5. Michelle Victoriano; (Act Ganern)	4. Kitty Velez; (The Tooth Will Set You Free)	6. Venz Bait-it; Mop-star Royalty
50	March 11, 2018	Rey Valera	4. Mel Poquiz; (Electro Move It! Move It!)	3. MM Gigante; (May Teatrong Bibe)	2. Cathy Motil; (I Will Palau Him)	6. Jerry Lapitan; (Animal Love so Sweet)	1. Mico Salazar; (Write, Camera, Action!)	5. Tina Erbon; Quail Egg to the Bones
51	March 17, 2018	Lilet	2. Jasmin Evangelista; (Jeans Lister)	1. Emily Ampoloquio; (Melanie Markets)	4. Mamon Llavore; (Hanga Muhlach)	5. Ben Mascariñas; (Games Ingram)	3. Mimi Dicen; (Kids my Life)	6. Lirah Bermudez; The Mighty Tour
52	March 24, 2018	Marc Tupaz (Shamrock)	4. Edz Zamora; (A Tapa, A Tao, di A Takbo)	5. Boy Matalipne; (Oven-minded ka Ba?)	1. Mary Jane Alanguilan; (Kalye Lily)	6. Badette Santos; (Alamang Girl)	2. Roel Aldana; (Follow Avelino)	3. Kate Gabriel; Gown to Earth
53	March 25, 2018	K Brosas	6. Shy Garrido; (Pilipinas... Game Canada?)	3. Katsumi Lee; (Red, Red, White)	2. Kixie Maranon; (Vlog Sisters)	4. Mhany Arvez; (Care dela Fuente)	1. Irene Jolovelo; (Crew or False)	5. Lyn Sultan; Pera, Mama, Dito na Lang!
54	April 1, 2018	BoybandPH	3. Janro Padil; (Jowa-no Gibbs)	6. Venneth Flores; (He Was a Cater Boi)	5. Gelo Dinapo; (Idalangin mo sa Make-up-al)	4. Nene Miralles; (Craft, Craft, Craft... Champion!)	1. Chelle Estrada; (Air Suklay)	2. Darwin Moreto; Lumaban ka ng Patatas
55	April 7, 2018	Jason Dy	1. Jackie Oira; (Pera Usog)	6. Jinky Butlay; (A Moment Like Dish)	3. AC Suarez; (An-draw E.)	5. Oliver Yumol; (Tawad ng Tanghalan)	2. Merwyn Abel; (I Did It my Weight)	4. Mark Daniel Brian; Mga Galawang PC
56	April 8, 2018	Hajji Alejandro	5. Alki Dignos; (Ang Buhay ay Waiter Waiter Lang)	4. Echo Abenoja; (Don't K-pop on Us Baby)	2. Sarah Bangcaray; (Des-pastillas)	1. Candy Garcia; (Ulam Mae Saison)	6. Loyd Rodica; (Laging Tapa at Laging Totoo)	3. Mark Velasco; Wag Mong Buhayin ang Bantay
57	April 14, 2018	Nadine Lustre	3. Deo Ramirez; (Say Chess!)	1. Josie Lorcha; (Maruya Carey)	5. Sky Atienza; (Ex in Line)	6. Jam Magno; (Pinilakang Toppings)	4. Mark Valido; (Disband's in Love With You, Pare)	2. Bimmy de Guia; Laugh Moves in Mysterious Ways
58	April 15, 2018	Jugs and Teddy	5. Moises Llamas; (E-bully and Ivory)	3. Kaye Mirandilla; (I Said Hiya... Hiya Ha)	6. Jhosen Barcelon; (Love me Like You Dude)	4. Jean Velasco; (Bank Bank! Into the Room)	1. Grasya Tumacas; (Gig Girls Don't Cry)	2. Rainier Natividad; Wake up Little Sushi
59	April 21, 2018 April 22, 2018	Luis Manzano (Note: Despite not singing, they were still counted as guest artists.) and Vilma Santos-Recto	2. Jess Toralba; (Palo the Leader)	6. Jean Carey Nasayad; (Bigas Loser)	3. Nazarene Baluran; (Mall, Medium, Large)	5. Diboy Alcano; (Besh Seller)	4. Roi Abellana; (Suki Serna)	1. Venisse Siy; Ikaw Foreign Ang Iibigin Ko
60	April 28, 2018	Sharon Cuneta	1. TJ Apostol; (Quotable Clothes)	3. Jah Ansano; (Lupa Gutierrez)	4. Rico Alejandro; (Toda and Handsome)	5. Nica Reyes; (Hip-half)	6. Jaeirus de Vera; (Nasa Huli ang Pagsi-sisig)	2. Willy Lorenzo; Sabong mga Daliri
61	April 29, 2018	Kim Chiu	6. Renard Bugash; (App, App and Away!)	3. Luis Gragera; (Look-so ng Dugo)	2. Neng Mondragon; (Athlete You Tried)	4. AE Afurong; (Philip Serbedor)	5. Chat Wellington; (Aral Mina)	1. Dyvez Entenal; Sport-ahan Ta Ka
62	May 5, 2018	Wency Cornejo	4. Beet Holgado; (Offer, Disappear, ½, ¼)	1. TJ Armada; (Wine Not?!)	2. Ian Ancheta; (Coach Mom-boo)	6. Mark Carunungan; (The Singing Me)	5. Jelly Balasabas; (Zamboanga ka 'Day)	3. Jan Pedracio; Dogs and Teddy
63	May 6, 2018	Arci Muñoz	5. Angelica de Asis; (K-pop the Good Work)	3. Michael Tinoy; (Fashion Your Seatbelts)	4. Al Toraja; (Cajon Davila)	2. Albert Aguilar; (Jack and Jail)	6. JL Luzuriaga; (Lesson Paksiw)	1. Raffy Roque; Lito Lapis
64	May 12, 2018	Nyoy Volante	6. Karl Redola; (Na-sayaw na ang Lahat)	1. Sai Mendoza; ('Nay in Shining Armor)	4. Jeff Amparo; (Bro, Bro, Bro Your Boat)	3. Dianne Dahilan; (Clean on Me)	2. Resie Bartolay; (Hero mga Bata!)	5. Abba Castillo; Your Bass Sounds Familiar
65	May 13, 2018	Rachel Alejandro	2. Benok Valderama; (Sa Coco ng Agila)	1. Morrie Simpron; (No Youth-turn)	3. Shiela Franco; (Chem Chiu)	4. Pauleen Salvador; (Tela Padilla)	5. Nishan Santos; (Hot Encode)	6. Pamela Vertus; Paa, Tuhod, Balikat, Solo
66	May 19, 2018	Top Suzara (Freestyle)	2. Phil Magbutay; (The Kwek Brown Fox)	6. Em Saldana; (All the Jingle Ladies)	4. Arlyn Bijis; (Fish That You, Lola?)	3. Maldo Sabrida; (I Can Make it Toda Rain)	5. Bianca Nethercott; (Shock and Jill)	1. Mitchie Membrebe; Lettuce Pray
67	May 20, 2018	Janella Salvador	1. Angel Bayoca; (Singular and Floral)	2. April Tolentino; (Haha Salvador)	5. Vhon Ruiz; (To the Highest Label)	4. CJ Abueg; (Crime Me a River)	3. Josh Marquina; (Chef of My Heart)	6. Ayang Tenorias; A Round of Upload
68	May 26, 2018	Shanti Dope	3. Julia San Diego; (Hey, Gig Spender)	2. Mylene Jabonete; (Kahera Shy)	5. Dhel Delantar; (Koro Plata Mata)	1. Luis Philip Yumang; (Doug Gamer)	4. Jonas Taguiam; (Before Toilet You Go)	6. Jaira Valido III; Hikaw Na!
69	May 27, 2018	Karylle and Yael Yuzon	5. Kevin Gumarao; (Solo Lamay)	1. Ramjun Mangubat; (Ka-usher Ka!)	2. Raymond Alamis; (Na-goyo, Japan)	3. Moymoy Macalos; (Dressy Mendiola)	4. Britt Abayon; (Buto Mo, I-patrol Mo!)	6. Daniel Diaz; Bowling in the Deep
70	June 2, 2018	Anne Curtis	2. Ella Mae de Guzman; (Wans-kampanya-taym)	6. Justin Rieta; (Denied Natuto)	5. Janjan Bandojo; (Tula Hihina Rin ang Ulan)	1. Bianca Garcia; (So Shift of Love Songs)	4. Ryan Casabon; (Banaue Vice Terraces)	3. Katelyn Hao; I've Benta Paradise...
71	June 3, 2018	Jay Durias (South Border)	5. Gocora Raymundo; (Concert Citizen)	1. Angelic Bernante; (One Flash One)	3. Gabriel Bucton; (Orphan Gangnam Style)	6. Warren Sapinit; (Right Here Waiter For You)	4. Tata Suan; (Penoy Pride)	2. Juan Fernando Bago; Jam-one to Watch Over Me
72	June 9, 2018	Kean Cipriano	3. Ace Academia; (Track Obama)	2. Joseph Garcia; (I See Your True Scholar)	5. AJ Diaz; (Scout for Joy)	6. Faith Alsen Perez; (Rock-gabay Baby)	1. Tin Tin Chua; (Uy Kumusta, Housewife?)	4. Victoria Perez; Jona, Jongalawa, Jongatlo
73	June 10, 2018	Maymay Entrata	4. Gladys Flores; (A, Your Idol-able)	3. Chudi Marcos; (Don't Rap Believin')	1. Kila Mae Gallo; (Let's Get Musical... Musical!)	5. Donna Ricafrente; (Wedding ka Bang Makilala?)	2. Jeijei Tayactac; (King Kopra)	6. JR Nueva; Meter Pan
74	June 16, 2018	Marco Sison	2. Judy Vinas; (Troupe to Jerusalem)	1. Bettina Nabiula; (Attendant is a Must)	3. Nards Roque; (May The Pest Man Win)	5. Luis Gerzon; (Jam Milby)	4. Camille Conde; (Isang Tanong, Isang Sago)	6. Marvin Calanoc; Counting Kaalaman
75	June 17, 2018	Pokwang	3. Ching Misa; (Enroll That Jazz)	1. Thalia Casonete; (Lotion Deep)	5. Darlyn Aldunar; (Educ Manzano)	4. John Rhey Brazil; (Lulong ng Palad)	2. Jersey Fajardo; (Demo Moore)	6. Neil Lopez; Jazz Once
76	June 23, 2018	Maja Salvador	2. Paul de Vera; (Bilin Crawford)	4. Moana Alena; (Nanny Pacquiao)	1. Aki Manganti; (Store-rete)	6. Clement Castillano; (Sandy An-tulong)	3. Marvin Castillo; (Pride and Seek)	5. Red Lat; Science na Science Talaga
77	June 24, 2018	The Voice Teens alumni (Jona Soquite, Jeremy Glinoga, and Isabella Vinzon)	5. Shai Murillo; (So Car Away)	2. Nasilyn Dojillo; (Ka-post Palad)	6. Riri Limgas; (Kung Pedi Lang Sana)	4. Mar Manansala; (Fish Volts)	1. Lhen Ebora; (Body and Shawl)	3. PFT Bryan Decemer C. Legados; Service Presley
78	June 30, 2018	Wacky Kiray	3. Edz Medina; (Apoy ay Pilipino)	1. Marites Estrellado; (Peek-a-book)	6. Lorraine Joyce Moscoso; (Winnie the Push)	2. MJ Matias; (Oh My Grad!)	5. Layla Adriatico; (Walang Katulad, I-Bahrain)	4. Emmanuel Espino; Nerd of the Rings
79	July 1, 2018	Aegis	3. Lyn Ravelo; (Swing Umuulan at Kapiling Ka)	2. Dexter Ruano; (Uwi Ocampo)	5. Auriz Judavar; (Jump and Marsha)	6. Chine Ticoy; (Ta-vape Ta-vape Po)	4. Pia Camacho; (Reco Blanco)	1. Revo Torrichiva; John Frats
80	July 7, 2018	Mitoy Yonting	5. Ryan Mark Sapiandante; (Box to The Future)	2. Babes Antique; (Have I Told You Leyte That I Loved You)	6. Onad Dronas; (A-linis Morissette)	3. Anne Davis; (Kahit Cutting Pagtingin)	4. Jas Balbero; (Friends Verano)	1. Cesar Salcedo; Don't Blues Hope
81	July 8, 2018	Ethel Booba	2. Donna Maturingan; (One Day, Isang Arrow)	6. Lester Dela Peña; (I Old Yah!)	5. Jhay-ar Victorio; (Persia, Second Ako)	1. Melody Pajo; (Salmon to Watch Over Me)	4. Howard Fuertes; (Volley, Indonesia)	3. Marjorie Silvestre; A Long Time Agaw
82	July 14, 2018	Janine Berdin	2. Rodjie Recalde; (Bigas Abelgas)	1. Ponji Candelaria; (Injure Abrenica)	4. Angela Fernandez; (Front Sinatra)	5. Jaybee Abeja; (Swim Tamis ng Wine, Swim Tatag ng Sunshine)	6. Mhor Tonic Jr.; (Baril Espanto)	3. Leslie Ordinario; Bread of Roses
83	July 15, 2018	Lloyd Umali	2. Manuel Jao; (I-clown ang Lahat sa Akin)	1. Mira Maquiling; (Alis Dixon)	6. Mae Laforteza; (Toll at Once)	5. Lors Endangal; (Cherry Pie Pi-kotse)	4. Jeff Pelen; (Trike and Trike Until You Succeed)	3. Ervhin Pastrado; One Last Crime
84	July 21, 2018	The Day After Valentine's cast (JC Santos and Bela Padilla)	2. Ernest Delos Reyes; (Ibong Pi-fit)	1. Monara Maglaya; (Jaya Mo Ba 'To?)	3. Macky Gravador; (Joey Markets)	4. Chan Tulabing; (Pedia de Peligro)	5. Ian Navarro; (Guy and Pep)	6. Jeck Jeck Olayvar; Ice Ice Baby! Building Di-di-ding Di-di-ding-ding
85	July 22, 2018	Imelda Papin	3. Jaira Alvida; (Tsikot-tsikot Lang)	1. Macky Sosa; (Sa 'kin ang Huling Alak-hak)	6. Harold Reyes; (Insert Swim Card)	5. Arline del Mundo; (Bango Sentral ng Pilipinas)	4. Lommer Lualhati; (Bunot, Dos, Tres)	2. Rozette Kaey Pablo; Film-a Santos
86	July 28, 2018	Andrew E.	2. Jed Diaz; (Bata-Bata-Pick)	5. Vince Dichoso; (Smell but Terrible)	3. Retchel Retes; (Bakit Casino Pa?)	4. Rome Trinidad; (Sipa at Tiyaga)	6. Celso Macapagal; (Ni Hao na Manok)	1. Vincess Esparza; Jeep the Faith
87	July 29, 2018	Michael Pangilinan	4. Darlyn Portallo; (Gitara, ang Munting Princesa)	3. Arra Acenita; (Pimples Romana)	5. Alfred Bautista; (I.T. Atihan)	2. Dann Lina; (Muhammad Volley)	6. Lara Mercado; (Trio Locsin)	1. Joseph Rosendal; Brad Influence
88	August 4, 2018	Rico J. Puno	3. Francis Barrameda; (Baga ka 'Day)	6. Maris Faller; (Med Madela)	4. Princess Gerald Billano; (Copy Yippy Yehey!)	5. Kaye Uchi; (Pilit Ako-rales)	1. Jeffrey Buena; (You Gotta Repeat, Before we Kick It)	2. Dennise Rauto; Malaysia Keys
89	August 5, 2018	Isay Alvarez and Robert Seña	2. Bea Imperial; (KZ For You)	3. Ann Pascua; (Beaucon Pandan)	5. Jewel Reyes; (Fast, Foster, Fostest)	6. Gelo Papa; (Maki-Back Out! Huwag Matakot!)	4. Lyn Cleofas; (Malapit na Ako, Wake ka Lang)	1. Neurie Talaman; Pasyal Return
90	August 11, 2018	Pilita Corrales	1. Rubs Valencia; (Mall but Terrible)	5. Yang Torres; (Na-nice, Tatay, Gusto kong Tinapay)	3. Francis Javier; (Trash ng Bayan)	6. Lois Manuel; (Tiangge-line Quinto)	4. Claudz Moreno; (Vroom Panes)	2. Prince Castellano; Tsaa-tsaa Padilla
91	August 12, 2018	Jericho Rosales	6. Jam Avenilla; (The Cold Never Brother me Anyway)	5. Migz Lim; (Pinsan Lang Kita Iibigin)	4. Gena Satorre; (Plays Lang, Wag Ako)	3. Rorenz Cortez; (Ama o Mali?)	1. Kim Cardona; (Caution! Wet Flour)	2. Eco Ramota; Rolling Tinda Deep
92	August 18, 2018	Melai Cantiveros	2. Ching Oriel; (Momma Cum Laude)	6. Jay Quidlat; (Bros Lee)	1. Giah Silva; (I Believe I Can Pie)	4. MJ Delos Santos; (Seoul, South Choreo)	3. Mikee Corvera; (And It's Toilet, Baby Now, It's Toilet)	5. Sendo Floresca; Album Abrenica
93	August 19, 2018	Sam Milby	4. John Arcenas; (Nasa Huni ang Pagsisisi)	3. Danna Betchanicha; (Pik Pak Broom)	2. Lexy Lizaso; (Gay-bigan Lang Pala)	1. EJ Valeras; (Ako'y Psycho at Ika'y Akin Lamang)	5. Choco Bagatsing; (Dubai... I Hate to See You Go)	6. Rey Enano; Ligo Lapid
94	August 25, 2018	Miss Granny cast (Sarah Geronimo, Xian Lim, and James Reid)	6. Joren Crisologo; (Breakfast in Vid)	1. Mics Castillote; (Cruise Maryosep)	3. Manil Cornista; (Laundry Hepburn)	5. Jefferson Baculi; (Switch Child o' Mine)	4. Blu Palomo; (Kapag May Katwiran, Ipaglaba Mo!)	2. Kevin Troqueña; Demo Lang Alam
95	August 26, 2018	SoulJa (Jaya and Jason Dy)	5. John Cedrick Perez; (Walo, Siyam, Shot Put)	4. Kate Meneses; (Don Room-antiko)	2. Precious Ann Banzon; (Lako ang Nagwagi)	3. Erwin Salvador; (Tambay Kiss Me, Tambay Hug Me)	6. Justin Geronimo; (Token for Granted)	1. Koronoy Brillantes; A Buchi-tsek Ek-ek-ek
96	September 1, 2018	Ice Seguerra	5. Patrick de Leon; (Chess Dating a Gangster)	1. Manny Vergara; (Sushi ng Tagumpay)	2. Mar Bendal; (Butcher Hands Up in the Air!)	6. Rhia Acbay; (It's Not Your Float)	3. Anjz Santos; (Zayn Balik)	4. Carissa Encarnacion; As a Mata of Fact
97	September 2, 2018	Dulce	2. Mark Castañeda; (Bread and Potter)	4. Edith Pinili; (Watch me Whip, Watch me Nanay)	1. Gerald Navarro; (I Snatch You, It's Me)	3. Tracy Paquit; (Jon Bun Jovi)	5. Jake Jerald Liguit; (News-i Balasi)	6. Arron Legaspi; Dance With my Powder
98	September 8, 2018	Celeste Legaspi	2. Kareena Totaan; (How Code You Say You'll Love Me?)	3. Eco Estanislao; (Dance and Roses)	5. Angie Castillo; (Police Navidad)	6. Ash Aguirre; (Ulam sa Pansin)	1. Jam Luna; (Please Re-fly)	4. Aira Christine Garcia; Fish Don't Ask Me
Special	September 9, 2018	Best Mode: See details						
Special	September 15, 2018	Daniel Padilla	6. Santie Felix Celso; (Cardo de Konsensya)	1. Michael Angelo Lasac; (Mr. Bean Love, But It's Over Now)	2. Ricky Luzano; (Manny my Love so Sweet)	3. Isra Jeron Ysmael; (Sarah sa Init, Sarah sa Lamig)	4. Carissa Viaje; (Iba Kathryn Eh!)	5. Jonathan Garcia; Kung Nagtitipid ka, Don't Boyet!
Special	September 16, 2018	TNT Boys	5. Donna Cariaga; (Kalma... Donna Panic!)	1. Moi Bien; (Moi Gising!)	4. Elsa Droga; (How Much Elsa Droga in the Window?)	6. Gerard Acao; (Acao ay may Lobo)	2. Matet de Leon; (Matet Ngayon ka Lang)	3. Mel Feliciano; Mel Me... Where Did I Go Wrong?
99	September 22, 2018 September 23, 2018	Sharon Cuneta	3. Nicole Calinawan; (Aray ang Sketch!)	1. TJ Reyes; (Kampanerang Scuba)	5. Allan dela Cruz; (Baha, Tuhod, Balikat, Ulo)	4. Rodgel Pesado; (Love Isda Answer)	6. Popoy Liray; (Winter, Spring, Samar, Fall)	2. Marlon Paniki; Tat's up, Madlang People?
Special	September 29, 2018	Marcelito Pomoy	1. Pau and Haydee Mañosca; (Yassi Stress-man)	4. Izza and Kakaye dela Cruz; (Just Birit!)	5. Dexter and Denver Santos; (Tatlong Bente Sirko)	3. Jayhuan and Jaythu Behagan; (Manikang Bagong Taon)	2. JB and Rhea Abalos; (Ulam Ako Kung Wala Ka)	6. Francis Roy Lazana and Arra Joy Mag-isa; Manok po Ninong, Manok po Ninang
100	September 30, 2018	Yassi Pressman and Sam Concepcion	3. Raven Capili; (Harana Oh Na Na)	4. Eljay Villafuerte; (Patayin sa Indak si Barbara)	5. She Vailoces; (Lady in Thread)	2. Betchay Padilla; (Wag Kang Bibitaw... Café Lang!)	1. Waliah Lampo; (Syanong Cuneta)	6. Ernie Paredes; I'm Taxi and I Know It
101	October 6, 2018	Gloc-9	1. Jirome Cutamora; (Shoes That Ball)	4. Gudo Dalafu; (Andrew Board Medina)	3. Warren Santos; (Walk Dyan... May Kiliti Ako Dyan)	6. Nitz Calamba; (Lady Ga-guard)	2. Neri Fabella; (Mahal Kita... Arab You)	5. Jenelyn Refulgente; Re-wax ka Lang, Sagot Kita
102	October 7, 2018	Jinky Vidal (Freestyle)	3. David Jung; (Korean Cipriano)	1. Jaycee Ganaden; (Bilang Ikaw)	4. Jaymar Macapuno; (Sana Dangwa ang Puso Ko)	6. Zell Decutido; (Pwede ka Bang Ma-KTV?)	2. Mark Perez; (Du-run Du-run)	5. Yazee Baronda; I-Cowboy Nalulungkot at Walang Makausap
103	October 13, 2018	Bea Alonzo and Aga Muhlach	2. Son Dizon; (Ngayon at Kainan-man)	1. Macmac Quiero; (Be My Leyte)	5. Ara Dayate Ricafort; (Bagets Nga ba Mahal Kita)	6. Aike Albeso; (Bituin na Bituin Ako)	3. Yang Magana; (4:30 na... Anghang TV Na!)	4. JM Santos; Igib Love on Christmas Day
104	October 14, 2018	Nikki Valdez and John Lapus	3. Arjhay Jumao-as; (Luke's Can be Deceiving)	6. Danmar Cunanan; (Bora the Explorer)	4. Ernie Joquilon; (Hello? Is Iniwan Home?)	1. Ardee Asadon; (Tapat Mo, Kinis Mo)	2. Cristelle Joy Ollano; (The Shoe Must Go On)	5. Julie Campollo; Babalita Muli
105	October 20, 2018	Joey Generoso (Side A)	2. Jay Lopez; (Muscle-lito Pomoy)	6. Jasmine Tabañag; (Bi-cleaning Itim)	1. Beng dela Cruz; (Duh as Ship)	4. Adrian Valle; (Hele Buendia)	5. Rolando Millan; (Barber Streisand)	3. Nikka Artuz; What Tokyo so Long
106	October 21, 2018	Janno Gibbs	4. Jerrel Mercader; (Labi ng Lagim)	1. Jovic Nudalo; (Wag Kang Kabibe)	6. Clyde Eric Capeniares; (I'm Ronda Top of the World)	5. Haz Caridad; (The Grad-est Showman)	2. JL Guevarra; (Guide and Seek)	3. Ardie Espiritu; Kastilang Buhangin
107	October 27, 2018	Pepe Herrera	4. Marvin Briones; (I'm Bully-proof, Nothing to Lose)	3. Kaleb Cruz; (Mr. Olon-gwapo City)	6. Kate Tiongson; (Kadilim-diliman ng Lola)	5. JJ de Rosas; (Yemang mga Daliri)	2. Mary Anne Lopez; (I Can Pilit!)	1. Joy Lozano; Here, There, and Underwear
108	October 28, 2018	Kuh Ledesma	1. Art Mabag; (Lechon Learned)	3. Onyok dela Cruz; (Appeal.de.ap)	4. Yeng Trinchera; (Ba-granny Agbayani)	6. Angel Dinoso; (Pakpak Oom Momow)	5. Mark Eballa; (Draw, A Deer A Female Deer)	2. Maria Angelica Santos; Law Meija
109	November 3, 2018	ASAP G! (Darren Espanto, Kyle Echarri, and Jayda Avanzado)	3. Germi Salcon; (Baril Manilow)	4. Jeff Reotan; (Paki-hubby na Lang na Mahal ko Siya)	5. Ed Tugahan; (Laki sa Lanao)	2. JB Uytingco; ('Tol You So!)	1. Raffy Rabia; (Never Gonna Gift You Up)	6. Maweng Amor; Okay sa O-light
110	November 10, 2018	Jodi Sta. Maria	3. Roman Pascual; (Laro Laro Sinta)	2. Donn Torres; (Kontra-hontas)	6. Jerwinn Miñas; (Mosquito kung Christmas)	4. Pao Bonifacio; (Freddie A-guitar)	5. Bonnie Faith Gutierrez; (Hangin by a Moment)	1. Camae Espaldon; Shop ba ang Dahilan?
111	November 11, 2018	Bugoy Drilon and Liezel Garcia	6. Julz Era; (Habang may Bahay)	2. Japjap Talania; (Sayaw Mo't sa Hindi)	1. Kaye Babiera; (Dos Floor Dos)	3. RJ Mateo; (Squid Playing Games)	4. Kiraray Gando; (Direk Cathy Garcia-Jolina)	5. Belmar Guro; Not Once, Not Twice, But Fries
112	November 17, 2018	Regine Velasquez	2. John Mark Pomada; (Hanga Ko)	5. Noel Pe; (Sister Disco Man)	3. Cath Antonio; (Say Dad You Love Me)	6. Izza Mae Cruz; (In Your Rice)	4. Rechiel Nepales; (Sa Aking Pag-gig-isa)	1. Russel Lee; High-langan ko'y Ikaw
113	November 18, 2018	Kris Lawrence	6. Carlo Talidong; (You Give Love Babad Name)	2. Mark Benoy; (Let the Spain Remain)	4. Joanne Zaquita; (Prom This Moment On)	3. Roxy Montero; (Rumba Gutierrez)	5. Xian Bilaza; (Mano Phone)	1. Manuel Dajes; Pinoy Big Breader
114	November 24, 2018	DIVAS (Kyla and Yeng Constantino)	4. Maricel Palaming; (A-kyla mo Hindi ko Pansin)	5. Arvin Misalang; (Walang Pork-ever)	1. Mabeth Salangani; (Bakit Kung Sino Spa?)	6. Sara Shane Suante; (Let it Gold)	2. Mon Cos; (I Spear Believe in Lovin' You)	3. Renz Ruther Robosa; Hubby Cheeks
115	November 25, 2018	Noven Belleza and Sam Mangubat	2. Jayson Cabanes; (As Long as You Laugh Me)	5. Reybem Randrup; (O... Lumipat Ka)	1. Ron de Leon; (Araw-gabi Walang Party)	6. Katkat Heramis; (No One Else Comes Clothes)	3. Raquel Bohol; (Auntie-unting Mararating)	4. Myk Bristol; Knock Knock! Host There?
116	December 1, 2018	Birit Queens (Jona Viray, Klarisse de Guzman, and Morissette)	2. Daisy Falcon; (Load Patawad)	1. Benj Bermudez; (Minamasdan Party Pagtulog Mo)	4. Pao Velasco; (Play Me To the Moon)	6. Bernard Orevillo; (Oops... Tech-a Lang)	5. Ace Beroy; (Tinda Navy)	3. Jen Barrantes; Kailangan Corn Ikaw
117	December 2, 2018	Louie Heredia	2. Lovely Agapay; (Si Fi-limot)	1. Rose dela Isla; (Ex Cortez)	3. Shen Malaca; (Dumb and Drummer)	6. Nicole Victoria; (I Love You Jordan You'll Ever Know)	4. Ian Bermundo; (Alien Adarna)	5. Nathan Dimayuga; Lead Between the Lines
118	December 8, 2018	Abrenica Duo (Aljur and Vin Abrenica)	1. Paul Paris; (We are Next Online)	5. Grace Silva; (Say That You Lomi)	3. Angelo Saavedra; (Birit-ney Spears)	2. Ky de Guzman; (K-sick Tandingan)	4. Angel Regalado; (Ogie Al-cashier)	6. Wyeth Cadavan; Don't Turo it All Away
119	December 9, 2018	Jessa Zaragoza and Dingdong Avanzado	3. Lady Lava Haganos; (The Sun Will Come Out Toma-row)	2. John Mark Ani; (See You Leyte, Alligator)	6. Chezka Ibarreta; (Feedings, Nothing More Than Feedings)	1. Totoy Omas-as; (Paki-sabong na Lang na Mahal ko Siya)	5. Nell Lambino; ('Di Mo Lang Ulam)	4. Archie Dumalagan; Tweety Beard
Season break: December 15 and 16 episodes were pre-empted to give way for the airing of Family is Love: 2018 ABS-CBN Christmas Special.
Special	December 22, 2018	TJ Monterde and KZ Tandingan	3. Fraction Dancers; (Formed This Moment On)	1. Whapakz Group; (Niyog na Niyog mong Sasabihin)	5. Holy Voices; (School me Maybe)	4. Power Dangerz; (I Want to Suspend my Lifetime Loving You)	6. DMRJ 5k; (Quezon Learned)	2. Boys Impact; The Unkabogable Boys Ganda
120	December 23, 2018	Gonzaga Sisters (Toni and Alex Gonzaga)	3. Learsi Gomez; (June, Julia, August)	5. Ever Banania; (Bag Dyan! May Kiliti Ako Dyan)	2. Lovelyn Supreno; (Supplies! Gulat ka Noh?)	6. Mich Lemi; (Singkit-ta'y Nakikita Ako'y Natutunaw)	4. Mhyang Dalawampo; (Pulis be Careful With my Heart)	1. Matthew Gatmaitan; Barako Sa'yo
121	December 29, 2018	Nikki Valdez, Roselle Nava, and Desiree del Valle	1. Jay Raffy Mercader; (A-ngipin Ako)	6. Isang Alsree; (Langit, Lumpia, Impyerno)	2. Marialyn Cerbito; (Brushing Through the Snow)	5. Lucky Charles Historia; (Yeng Pasko ay Sumapit)	4. Claire Bricenio; (SK Fine, Whatever)	3. Jorell Canuel; Hike Hanopol
122	January 5, 2019	Bayani Agbayani and Edu Manzano	6. Aries Colinares; (Copy Birthday to You)	3. Bona Llacer; (Walang Labis, Walang Ulam)	4. Arnold Añana; (Linis and Gentlemen)	5. Remelan Nepomuceno; (Pool ka Lang)	1. Noel Siazon; (Taiwan ko ba Kung Bakit Type Kita)	2. Cris de Mesa; Glutang Itim
123	January 6, 2019	Gary Valenciano	2. Niño Crisostomo; (Tool, Dark and Handsome)	3. Gellie Badong; (Nurse Love Never Dies)	4. Raine Orca; (Timbang Gabi)	5. Joje Ariego; (Pest Song Ever)	6. Jerrymae Obo; (A Store is Born)	1. Dharrel Monsirat; Ta-coat ka ba sa Dilim?

=== SING-vestigators ===
Legend:
Regular SING-vestigator
Additional SING-vestigator
Guest SING-vestigator

Apps		Panelists in attendance (Sorted by first appearance, with episode designations)
g#	p#	Panelists in attendance (Sorted by first appearance, with episode designations)
119	1	Wacky Kiray (1–16, 18–19, 21–23, 25–77, 79–111, 113, 115–116, 118, 120–123; sp. 1–4)
114	1	Alex Gonzaga (1–33, 35–52, 55–97, 101, 103–108, 110–112, 115–119, 121–123; sp. 3–4)
113	2	Kean Cipriano (1–4, 8–53, 55–69, 71, 74, 80, 83–88, 90–101, 104–111, 115–116, 118, 121–123; sp. 1–3); Bayani Agbayani (5–9, 14–60, 62–65, 67, 70–121, 123; sp. 3–4)
110	2	Andrew E. (1–85, 87–97, 101, 103, 105, 111–112, 114–121; sp. 4); Angeline Quinto (1–18, 20, 22–72, 74–79, 90–115 117–119, 121–122; sp. 1–3)
11	1	KaladKaren (99, 102, 112–114, 117, 119, 122–123; sp. 1–2)
9	1	Juliana Segovia (84, 86, 88, 90–93, 96–97)
8	1	Long Mejia (66, 68–69, 80, 83, 104, 106, 109)
6	1	Brod Pete (98–99, 102, 113; sp. 1–2)
5	2	Negi (120, 122–123; sp. 1–2); Randy Santiago (100, 107–108, 110; sp. 3)
4	1	K Brosas (81–82, 89, 100)
2	1	Pooh (53–54)
1	8	Yeng Constantino (21); Toni Gonzaga (34); Empoy Marquez (72); Pokwang (78); Ruffa Mae Quinto (86); Zanjoe Marudo and Angelica Panganiban (98); Jessy Mendiola (sp. 4)
