= List of Kamen Rider Ex-Aid characters =

Kamen Rider Ex-Aid (仮面ライダーエグゼイド, Kamen Raidā Eguzeido) is a Japanese tokusatsu series that serves as the 27th installment in the Kamen Rider franchise and the 18th entry in the Heisei era, also commemorating the 45th anniversary of the franchise. The series centers on a conflict between humans and Bugsters, a form of computer virus that infects humans playing Genm Corporation (Genm Corp.) video games. Genm Corp. and the Ministry of Health counter the threat by developing Gamer Drivers and Rider Gashats for doctors to save their patients from the Bugster Viruses.

== Main characters ==
=== Emu Hojo ===
Emu Hojo (宝生 永夢, Hōjō Emu), also known by his gaming tag of "Genius Gamer M" (天才ゲーマーM, Tensai Gēmā Emu), is a master gamer and pediatrics intern, later surgical intern, who had been inspired to become both after receiving a life-saving surgery and a WonderSwan handheld console from Kyotaro Hinata. Emu is well-meaning and friendly, but also clumsy and absent-minded, which often gets him into trouble with nurses. As the series progresses, however, he matures and becomes less naive, picks up Kiriya Kujo's lying habit, and becomes a master manipulator comparable to Kuroto and Masamune Dan.

16 years prior to the series, the antisocial Emu had found solace in designing video game characters. After sending his concepts to Genm Corp. game designer, Kuroto, Emu received a prototype game that infected him with and turned him into patient zero for the Bugster Virus. As a result, an alternate persona called Parado manifested from Emu's desire for a playmate and assumed control, leading to the latter becoming "M" and being kidnapped by Next Genome scientists who had sought to extract the Bugster Virus for Kuroto. However, Parado had turned into a Bugster and separated himself from Emu, allowing the latter to pursue his desire to become a doctor and earn an internship at Seito University Hospital. Despite being separated from Parado, trace amounts of the Bugster's data causes Emu to maintain his gamer persona, become a Kamen Rider, and later grant him the ability to create Gashats from his imagination. After being recruited by CR, Emu has several encounters with Parado, discovers what had happened to him, and joins forces with Parado and other Gamer Riders to defeat the Bugsters and Masamune.

Utilizing the Mighty Action X (マイティアクションX, Maiti Akushon Ekkusu) Gashat in conjunction with the Gamer Driver, Emu can transform into Kamen Rider Ex-Aid Action Gamer (アクションゲーマー, Akushon Gēmā) Level 1. In this form, he gains superhuman jumping and can transform further into Action Gamer Level 2. In both forms, he wields the Gashacon Breaker (ガシャコンブレイカー, Gashakon Bureikā), which can switch between Hammer Mode (ハンマーモード, Hanmā Mōdo) and Blade Mode (ブレードモード, Burēdo Mōdo). Moreover, activating Mighty Action X generates a Game Area with several Energy Items randomly hidden inside chocolate block-like containers. He can also combine Mighty Action X with additional Gashats to achieve stronger forms, which are as follows:

- Robot Action Gamer Level 3 (ロボットアクションゲーマーレベル3, Robotto Akushon Gēmā Reberu Surī): An auxiliary form accessed from the Mighty Action X and Gekitotsu Robots (ゲキトツロボッツ, Gekitotsu Robottsu; Clash Robots) Gashats that equips Emu with the self-propelling Gekitotsu Smasher (ゲキトツスマッシャー, Gekitotsu Sumasshā) gauntlet.
- Hunter Action Gamer Level 5 (Dragon Fang) (ハンターアクションゲーマーレベル5 (ドラゴンファング), Hantā Akushon Gēmā Reberu Faibu [Doragon Fangu]): An auxiliary form accessed from the Mighty Action X and Drago Knight Hunter Z (ドラゴナイトハンターZ, Dorago Naito Hantā Zetto) Gashats along with up to three other Gamer Riders that equips Emu with the pyrokinetic Drago Knight Fang (ドラゴナイトファング, Dorago Naito Fangu) helmet.
  - Hunter Action Gamer Level 5 (Full Dragon) (ハンターアクションゲーマーレベル5 (フルドラゴン), Hantā Akushon Gēmā Reberu Faibu (Furu Doragon)): An enhanced version of Hunter Action Gamer Level 5 (Dragon Fang) that equips Emu with the Drago Knight Blade and Gun.
- Sports Action Gamer Level 3: An auxiliary form accessed from the Mighty Action X and Shakariki Sports Gashats that grants similar capabilities as Kuroto's version.
- Burger Action Gamer Level 4 (バーガーアクションゲーマーレベル4, Bāgā Akushon Gēmā Reberu Fō): An auxiliary form accessed from the Mighty Action X and Ju Ju Burger (ジュージューバーガー, Jū Jū Bāgā; Sizzling Burger) Gashats that equips Emu with a pair of roller skate-like DD Inliner (DDインライナー, Dī Dī Inrainā; Dash and Deliver) sabatons and the forearm-mounted Redchap Launcher (レッドチャップランチャー, Reddochappu Ranchā) and Yellowstard Launcher (イエロースタードランチャー, Ierōsutādo Ranchā) condiment bottles.
- Pac Action Gamer (パックアクションゲーマー, Pakku Akushon Gēmā): A special form accessed from the Mighty Action X and Pac Adventure (パックアドベンチャー, Pakku Adobenchā) Gashats that equips Emu with a pair of PAC Fight Glove (PACファイトグローブ, Pakku Gaito Gurōbu) gauntlets. This form appears exclusively in the web special Kamen Rider Genm: Legend Gamer Stage.
- Bike Action Gamer Level 0 (バイクアクションゲーマーレベル0, Baiku Akushion Gēmā Reberu Zero): A special form accessed from the Mighty Action X and Proto Bakusou Bike (Combi Fukkatsu Version) (プロト爆走バイク [コンビ復活バージョン], Puroto Bakusō Baiku [Konbi Fukkatsu Bājon]; Proto Burnout Bike [Combi Revival Version]) Gashats that grants superhuman speed. In this form, Emu wields the Front and Rear Armed Units. This form appears exclusively in the Kamen Rider Lazer Hyper Battle DVD special.

Additionally, Emu can assume the following forms by using unique Gashats in place of Mighty Action X:

- Double Action Gamer Level X (ダブルアクションゲーマーレベルX, Daburu Akushon Gēmā Reberu Ten/Ekkusu) and Level XX (レベルXX, Reberu Tuenti/Daburu Ekkusu): A chibi-like evolution of the Action Gamer forms and its subsequent sleeker upgrade, both of which are accessed from the double-sized Mighty Brothers XX (マイティブラザーズXX, Maiti Burazāzu Daburu Ekkusu) Gashat. The latter form splits Emu into the azure-colored Double Action Gamer Level XX L, which represents his level-headed doctor personality who prioritizes his patient's safety, and the orange-colored Double Action Gamer Level XX R, which represents his and/or Parado's hot-blooded gamer personality who prioritizes defeating their opponent to ensure victory. In this and all subsequent forms, he wields the Gashacon Key Slasher (ガシャコンキースラッシャー, Gashakon Kī Surasshā), which can switch between Blade Mode, Axe Mode (アックスモード, Akkusu Mōdo), and Gun Mode (ガンモード, Gan Mōdo). Double Action Gamer Level XX first appears in the crossover film Kamen Rider Heisei Generations: Dr. Pac-Man vs. Ex-Aid & Ghost with Legend Rider.
- Maximum Gamer Level 99 (マキシマムゲーマーレベル99, Makishimamu Gēmā Reberu Nainti Nain): Emu's super form accessed from the double-sized Maximum Mighty X (マキシマムマイティX, Makishimamu Maiti Ekkusu) Gashat that transforms him into his Action Gamer Level 2 form clad in the Maximum Gama (マキシマムゲーマ, Makishimamu Gēma) exosuit, which is capable of flying, extending its limbs, and grants the ability to rewrite a Bugster's coding, depower most other Gamer Riders, and heal any Game Disease victims. He can also separate from and put the Maximum Gama on autopilot while maintaining his Level 99 power. His finisher in this form is the Critical Break (クリティカルブレイク, Kuritikaru Bureiku).
  - Muteki Gamer (ムテキゲーマー, Muteki Gēmā): An evolution of Maximum Gamer Level 99 and Emu's final form accessed from the Maximum Mighty X Gashat combined with the adapter-like Hyper Muteki (ハイパームテキ, Haipā Muteki; Hyper Invincible) Gashat that grants warp speed capabilities and immunity to negative status effects and/or abilities, such as Kamen Rider Cronus' chronokinesis. His finisher in this form is the Critical Sparking (クリティカルスパーキング, Kuritikaru Supākingu). Alternatively, any one of the Gamer Riders can combine Hyper Muteki with their personal Gashats to gain invincibility via the former's Muteki Mode (ムテキモード, Muteki Mōdo), which has a 10 second time limit.
- Ghost Gamer (ゴーストゲーマー, Gōsuto Gēmā) Levels 1 and 2: A chibi-like special form and its subsequent sleeker upgrade, both of which are accessed from the Kaigan Ghost (カイガンゴースト, Kaigan Gōsuto; Eyes Open Ghost) Gashat, that grants flight capabilities. These forms appear exclusively in the crossover film Kamen Rider Heisei Generations: Dr. Pac-Man vs. Ex-Aid & Ghost with Legend Rider and the web special Kamen Rider Genm: Legend Rider Stage.
- Drive Gamer (ドライブゲーマー, Doraibu Gēmā) Level 2: A special form accessed from the Full Throttle Drive (フルスロットルドライブ, Furu Surottoru Doraibu) Gashat that grants the use of Kamen Rider Drive's Handle-Ken. This form appears exclusively in the web special Kamen Rider Genm: Legend Rider Stage.
- Gaim Gamer (ガイムゲーマー, Gaimu Gēmā) Level 2: A special form accessed from the Toukenden Gaim (刀剣伝ガイム, Tōken-den Gaimu; Swords Legend Gaim) Gashat that grants the use of Kamen Rider Gaim's Daidaimaru. This form appears exclusively in the web special Kamen Rider Genm: Legend Rider Stage.
- Creator Gamer (クリエイターゲーマー, Kurieitā Gēmā): A special form accessed from the Mighty Creator VRX (マイティクリエイターVRX, Maiti Kurieitā Bui Āru Ekkusu) Gashat that grants the ability to materialize weapons, obstacles, and traps. Emu's finisher in this form is an enhanced version of his original Critical Strike. This form appears exclusively in the film Kamen Rider Ex-Aid the Movie: True Ending.
- Novel Gamer Level X (ノベルゲーマー レベルX, Noberu Gēmā Reberu Ekkusu): A special form accessed from the Mighty Novel X (マイティノベルＸ, Maiti Noberu X) Gashat that grants reality warping capabilities. Emu's finisher in this form is the Critical Destiny (クリティカルデスティニー, Kuritikaru Desutinī). This form appears exclusively in the sequel novel Novel: Kamen Rider Ex-Aid: Mighty Novel X.

During the events of the crossover film Kamen Rider × Super Sentai: Ultra Super Hero Taisen, Emu temporarily assumes the form of Akarider where he commands the Gorengers' Variblune.

Emu Hojo is portrayed by Hiroki Iijima (飯島 寛騎, Iijima Hiroki). As a child, Emu is portrayed by Rai Takahashi (髙橋 來, Takahashi Rai).

=== Hiiro Kagami ===
Hiiro Kagami (鏡 飛彩, Kagami Hiiro) is a genius surgeon who recently returned from America, is described as a tsundere, displays a liking for sweets due to his late girlfriend Saki Momose, and can transform into Kamen Rider Brave (仮面ライダーブレイブ, Kamen Raidā Bureibu). A prodigy in the medical field, Hiiro is initially passive-aggressive towards Emu due to their differing beliefs. However, the former slowly grows to respect the intern over time, even adopting some of his beliefs. Despite appearing callous, Hiiro does care for others.

During the first Zero Day incident, Momose was infected with the Bugster Virus, but she had kept it secret from Hiiro due to his aloof attitude until he eventually learned what had happened when Graphite manifested from her. When Taiga Hanaya fails to defeat the Bugster, Momose dies and Hiiro develops a grudge against Taiga and Graphite despite harboring guilty feelings for himself. With Emu's help, Hiiro eventually accepts that he had partially contributed to Momose's death and reconciles with him. Amidst the Kamen Rider Chronicle crisis, Hiiro discovers Momose is among the Bugster Virus-infected victims whose life forces are stored in the Proto-Gashats and is blackmailed into joining Masamune Dan, who threatens to delete her data unless Hiiro serves him. After remembering Momose's last words however, Hiiro rejoins CR to defeat Masamune, guide new interns, and make peace with his past.

During the events of the V-Cinema Kamen Rider Ex-Aid Trilogy: Another Ending, Hiiro reconciles with Taiga before joining forces with him to defeat Lovrica, who had brainwashed a temporarily resurrected Momose. Before she dies once more, Hiiro comes to terms with her first death.

Utilizing the Taddle Quest (タドルクエスト, Tadoru Kuesuto) Gashat in conjunction with the Gamer Driver, Hiiro can transform into Kamen Rider Brave Quest Gamer (クエストゲーマー, Kuesuto Gēmā) Level 1. In this form, he wields the Reversal Shield (リバーサルシールド, Ribāsaru Shīrudo), can perform flaming dash attacks, and transform further into Quest Gamer Level 2. In both forms, he wields the Gashacon Sword (ガシャコンソード, Gashakon Sōdo), which can switch between Fire Mode (炎モード, Honō Mōdo) and Ice Mode (氷モード, Kōri Mōdo). Moreover, activating Taddle Quest generates a Game Area with several Energy Items randomly hidden inside treasure chest-like containers. He can also combine Taddle Quest with additional Gashats to achieve stronger forms, which are as follows:

- Beat Quest Gamer Level 3 (ビートクエストゲーマーレベル3, Bīto Kuesuto Gēmā Reberu Surī): An auxiliary form accessed from the Taddle Quest and DoReMiFa Beat (ドレミファビート, Doremifa Bīto) Gashats that equips Hiiro with the right forearm-mounted DoReMiFa Turntable (ドレミファターンテーブル, Doremifa Tāntēburu) phonograph and the left shoulder-mounted Watts Up Sounder (ワッツアップサウンダー, Wattsu Appu Saundā) speaker. To compensate for his lack of experience in rhythm games, he incorporates CPR techniques into his attacks.
- Hunter Quest Gamer Level 5 (Dragon Blade) (ハンタークエストゲーマーレベル5 (ドラゴンブレード), Hantā Kuesuto Gēmā Reberu Faibu (Doragon Burēdo)): An auxiliary form accessed from the Taddle Quest and Drago Knight Hunter Z Gashats alongside up to three other Gamer Riders that equips Hiiro with the right forearm-mounted Drago Knight Blade (ドラゴナイトブレード, Dorago Naito Burēdo).
  - Hunter Quest Gamer Level 5 (Full Dragon) (ハンタークエストゲーマーレベル5 (フルドラゴン), Hantā Kuesuto Gēmā): An enhanced version of Hunter Quest Gamer Level 5 (Dragon Blade) that equips Hiiro with the Drago Knight Fang and Gun.
- Famista Quest Gamer (ファミスタクエストゲーマー, Famisuta Kuesuto Gēmā): A special form accessed from the Taddle Quest and Famista (ファミスタ, Famisuta) Gashat that equips Hiiro with the Braver Grab (ブレイバーグラブ, Bureibā Gurabu) baseball glove and the left shoulder-mounted Play Ball Shooter (プレイボールシューター, Purei Bōru Shūtā) pitching machine. This form appears exclusively in the web special Kamen Rider Genm: Legend Gamer Stage.
- Safari Quest Gamer Level 4 (サファリクエストゲーマーレベル4, Safari Kuesuto Gēmā Reberu Fō): A special form accessed from the Taddle Quest and Night of Safari (ナイトオブサファリ, Naito Obu Safari) Gashat that equips Hiiro with the sonokinetic Safari Night Fang (サファリナイトファング, Safari Naito Fangu) helmet, the right forearm-mounted Safari Night Blade (サファリナイトブレード, Safari Naito Burēdo), and the left forearm-mounted Safari Night Gun (サファリナイトガン, Safari Naito Gan). This form appears exclusively in the web special Kamen Rider Brave: Survive! The Revived Beast Rider Squad.
- Galaxian Quest Gamer (ギャラクシアンクエストゲーマー, Gyarakushian Kuesuto Gēmā): A special form accessed from the Taddle Quest and Galaxian (ギャラクシアン, Gyarakushian) Gashats that equips Hiiro with the chest-mounted Beam Galashooter (ビームギャラクシューター, Bīmu Gyarakushūtā) laser cannon. This form appears exclusively in the crossover film Kamen Rider × Super Sentai: Ultra Super Hero Taisen.

Additionally, Hiiro can assume the following forms by using unique Gashats in place of Taddle Quest:

- Fantasy Gamer Level 50 (ファンタジーゲーマーレベル50, Fantajī Gēmā Reberu Fifuti): Hiiro's super form accessed from the Gashat Gear Dual β's Taddle Fantasy (タドルファンタジー, Tadoru Fantajī) mode that grants telekinesis, levitation capabilities, and the ability to open portals, create magical sword projections, and nullify the effects of Energy Items. His finisher in this form is the Critical Slash (クリティカルスラッシュ, Kuritikaru Surasshu).
- Legacy Gamer Level 100 (レガシーゲーマーレベル100, Regashī Gēmā Reberu Handoreddo): Hiiro's final form accessed from Another Hiiro's Taddle Legacy Gashat that grants the use of healing spells, which he can use on either himself or any of his allies, and the ability to create homing energy arrows. His finishers in this form are enhanced versions of his original Critical Strike and Finish, which increase in power if one of his allies is defeated in battle.

Hiiro Kagami is portrayed by Toshiki Seto (瀬戸 利樹, Seto Toshiki).

=== Poppy Pipopapo ===
Poppy Pipopapo (ポッピーピポパポ, Poppī Pipopapo) is a Bugster based on a video game character from the fictional rhythm game DoReMiFa Beat who is able to assume a human guise called Asuna Karino (仮野 明日那, Karino Asuna), (Note: Her name is an anagram for the Japanese word Kari no Nāsu (仮のナース, "temporary nurse").) works as a nurse for CR, and as a navigator for the Gamer Riders. She was born from Kuroto Dan's mother, Sakurako Dan (檀 櫻子, Dan Sakurako), who had helped him during his youth before he infected her with the Bugster Virus in an attempt to save her from an unknown regular illness.

Following Kuroto's first death, Poppy falls under Lovrica's sway and helps him and Parado complete the Kamen Rider Chronicle Gashat before serving as the Kamen Rider Chronicle crisis' referee and navigator. After Masamune kills Lovrica, Emu saves her from the latter's brainwashing. Wishing to redeem herself, Poppy revives Kuroto as a Bugster to help the Gamer Riders defeat Masamune. While she later sacrifices herself to do so, Kuroto uses a fragment of her data to restore her.

As a Bugster, Poppy is able to turn cutlery into energy weapons, utilize Energy Items' powers, and enter a level selected by the Kamen Riders. While working for Lovrica, she receives the Bugster Buckle II (バグスターバックルII, Bagusutā Bakkuru Tsubai; Bugster Buckle Zwei) belt and the Gashacon Bugvisor II (ガシャコンバグヴァイザーII, Gashakon Baguvaizā Tsubai; Gashacon Bugvisor Zwei), which she can combine to form the Buggle Driver II (バグルドライバーII, Baguru Doraibā Tsubai; Buggle Driver Zwei) and utilize in conjunction with the Toki Meki Crisis (ときめきクライシス, Toki Meki Kuraishisu; Heart Beat Crisis) Gashat to transform into Kamen Rider Poppy (仮面ライダーポッピー, Kamen Raidā Poppī). While transformed, she possesses immunity to conventional attacks. Her finisher is the Critical Crews-Aid (クリティカルクルセイド, Kuritikaru Kuruseido).

Poppy Pipopapo/Asuna Karino is portrayed by Ruka Matsuda (松田 るか, Matsuda Ruka).

=== Taiga Hanaya ===
Taiga Hanaya (花家 大我, Hanaya Taiga) is an unlicensed radiologist who is known as the "dark doctor" (闇のドクター, Yami no Dokutā) and can transform into Kamen Rider Snipe (仮面ライダースナイプ, Kamen Raidā Sunaipu). Five years prior to the series, while working for the Seito University Hospital's radiology department, he had been chosen by CR to become a Kamen Rider after detecting the Bugster Virus in one of his patients. He initially refused due to his many responsibilities until his partner, Jiro Maki (牧 治郎, Maki Jirō), made an attempt to take his place and suffered grievous injuries due in part to not being immunized against the Bugster Virus. Taiga begrudgingly accepted CR's offer, but failed to defeat the Bugster, Graphite, and save his patient, Saki Momose. After leaving CR and having his medical license revoked, he opened an illegal medical practice in an abandoned hospital and trained to protect himself from the side effects of becoming a Gamer Rider.

In the present, Taiga receives Rider equipment from Kuroto Dan with the intention of taking the other Gamer Riders' equipment and the burden of being a Rider for himself. While he gradually comes to accept his fellow Riders, Taiga also grapples with his guilt and shame for failing to save Saki. Because of this, he deliberately attempts to antagonize Saki's boyfriend, Hiiro, believing he deserves the latter's scorn, though the two eventually reconcile. Prior to and during the Kamen Rider Chronicle crisis, he reluctantly takes on Nico Saiba as an apprentice and works with the Gamer Riders to stop its mastermind, Masamune Dan. Following this, Taiga regains his medical license and opens a hospital to treat the Bugster Virus.

Utilizing the Bang Bang Shooting (バンバンシューティング, Ban Ban Shūtingu) Gashat in conjunction with the Gamer Driver, Taiga can transform into Kamen Rider Snipe Shooting Gamer (シューティングゲーマー, Shūtingu Gēmā) Level 1. In this form, he can turn into an energy bullet to perform a projectile attack and transform further into Shooting Gamer Level 2. In both forms, he wields the Gashacon Magnum (ガシャコンマグナム, Gashakon Magunamu), which can switch between Handgun Mode (ハンドガンモード, Handogan Mōdo) and Rifle Mode (ライフルモード, Raifuru Mōdo). Moreover, activating Bang Bang Shooting generates a Game Area with several Energy Items randomly hidden inside drum-like containers. He can also combine Bang Bang Shooting with additional Gashats to achieve stronger forms, which are as follows:

- Combat Shooting Gamer Level 3 (コンバットシューティングゲーマーレベル3, Konbatto Shūtingu Gēmā Reberu Surī): An auxiliary form accessed from the Bang Bang Shooting and Jet Combat (ジェットコンバット, Jetto Konbatto) Gashats that equips Taiga with the Air Force Winger (エアフォースウィンガー, Ea Fōsu Wingā) jetpack and the twin Gatling Combat (ガトリングコンバット, Gatoringu Konbatto) rotary guns.
- Hunter Shooting Gamer Level 5 (Dragon Gun) (ハンターシューティングゲーマーレベル5 (ドラゴンガン), Hantā Shūtingu Gēmā Reberu Faibu (Doragon Gan)): An auxiliary form accessed from the Bang Bang Shooting and Drago Knight Hunter Z Gashats along with up to three other Gamer Riders that equips Taiga with the left forearm-mounted Drago Knight Gun (ドラゴナイトガン, Dorago Naito Gan).
  - Hunter Shooting Gamer Level 5 (Full Dragon) (ハンターシューティングゲーマーレベル5 (フルドラゴン), Hantā Shūtingu Gēmā Reberu Faibu (Furu Doragon)): An enhanced version of Hunter Shooting Gamer Level 5 (Dragon Gun) that equips Taiga with the Drago Knight Fang and Blade.
- Xevious Shooting Gamer (ゼビウスシューティングゲーマー, Zebiusu Shūtingu Gēmā): A special form accessed from Bang Bang Shooting and the Xevious (ゼビウス, Zebiusu) Gashat that equips Taiga with the Solval Wing (ソルバルウィング, Sorubaru Wingu) jetpack and the twin Gatling Zapper (ガトリングザッパー, Gatoringu Zappā) rotary guns. This form appears exclusively in the web special Kamen Rider Genm: Legend Gamer Stage.

Additionally, Taiga can assume the following forms by using unique Gashats in place of Bang Bang Shooting:

- Simulation Gamer Level 50 (シミュレーションゲーマーレベル50, Shimyurēshon Gēmā Reberu Fifuti): Taiga's final form accessed from the Gashat Gear Dual β's Bang Bang Simulations (バンバンシミュレーションズ, Ban Ban Shimyurēshonzu) mode that equips him with the twin forearm-mounted Overblast Cannons (オーバーブラストキャノン, Ōbāburasuto Kyano) and the twin shoulder-mounted Scramble Gun Unit (スクランブルガンユニット, Sukuranburu Gan Yunitto) turrets. His finisher in this form is the Critical Fire (クリティカルファイヤー, Kuritikaru Faiyā).
- Kamen Rider Proto Snipe (仮面ライダープロトスナイプ, Kamen Raidā Puroto Sunaipu): Taiga's chibi-like original Rider form accessed from the Proto Bang Bang Shooting (プロトバンバンシューティング, Puroto Ban Ban Shūtingu) Gashat, which he discontinued usage of after its negative side effects nearly killed him.

Amidst the Kamen Rider Chronicle crisis, Taiga acquires two Kamen Rider Chronicle Gashats and uses them in conjunction with the Gamer Driver to transform into Kamen Rider Cronus. While his incomplete Bugster Virus antibodies prevent him from accessing Cronus' full power, Taiga instead gains access to his teammates' Gashacon Weapons. In the V-Cinema Kamen Rider Ex-Aid Trilogy: Another Ending, he acquires Poppy's Buggle Driver II and uses it with the Kamen Rider Chronicle Master Gashat in order to properly access Cronus' full power.

Taiga Hanaya is portrayed by Ukyo Matsumoto (松本 享恭, Matsumoto Ukyō).

=== Kuroto Dan ===
Kuroto Dan (檀 黎斗, Dan Kuroto) is the cold-blooded, manipulative, and narcissistic CEO and founder of the Genm Corp. (幻夢コーポレーション, Genmu Kōporēshon; Fantasy Dream Corporation) game company and son of previous CEO Masamune who believes his intelligence is something to be feared. Despite himself, Kuroto puts on a calm and polite front in public and select individuals he requires for his plans. Having created games for Masamune as a teenager and believing only he was capable of making great games, Kuroto develops a grudge against a young Emu, who had submitted game ideas that the former perceived as better than his. After becoming one of the first people to discover the Bugster Virus 16 years prior to the series, he infects Emu with it and studies him over the course of a decade before extracting the virus and using it to create the Bugsters. However, Kuroto's mother Sakurako also became infected with the Bugster Virus while helping him and died, leading to him losing his sanity, causing Zero Day via Proto Gashats (プロトガシャット, Puroto Gashatto), and framing Masamune for it five years prior to the series.

Following the epidemic, Kuroto contributes to the Ministry of Health's CR division and Rider systems to combat the Bugsters using his polite facade while also helping the monsters battle the Riders as Kamen Rider Genm (仮面ライダーゲンム, Kamen Raidā Genmu) (Note: Before his identity was exposed, Kuroto was referred to as "Black Ex-Aid" (黒いエグゼイド, Kuroi Eguzeido).) in order to collect the Gashats' data and create one for the "Ultimate Game" Kamen Rider Chronicle (仮面ライダークロニクル, Kamen Raidā Kuronikuru), a global augmented reality, massively multiplayer online game death battle with him as the "Game Master", all in an attempt to resurrect Sakurako. Upon manipulating the Gamer Riders into "clearing" 10 Gashats' data, Kuroto allows Emu to give him a "game over" so the former can use the death data to create the Dangerous Zombie Gashat before killing Kiriya Kujo for nearly exposing his identity. Despite this, Kuroto's machinations are revealed and he becomes a fugitive, stealing the Riders' Gashats along the way, such as Taddle Quest and Bang Bang Shooting to create the double-sized Gashat Gear Dual β (ガシャットギアデュアルβ, Gashatto Gia Dyuaru Bēta), until Emu defeats Kuroto and Parado kills him.

When the Bugsters take over Gemn Corp. and attempt to use Kamen Rider Chronicle to replace humanity with more of their kind, Poppy discovers she was born from Sakurako, who had hidden a Gamer Driver and the Proto Mighty Action X Origin Gashat as a failsafe, and uses the equipment to revive Kuroto as a Bugster with 99 lives. With his new lease on life, he christens himself "New Kuroto Dan" (新檀 黎斗, Shin Dan Kuroto) and joins forces with the Gamer Riders to exact revenge on Parado, revive Kiriya as a Bugster as well, and stop the Bugsters, with Poppy using Sakurako's memories to keep him in line. In the process, Kuroto discovers Masamune had manipulated him from the beginning and helps CR develop the Hyper Muteki Gashat so Emu can defeat Masamune and the Doctor Mighty XX Gashat to cure Bugster Virus victims and weaken Kamen Rider Chronicle's final boss, Gamedeus, losing a majority of his lives in the process. While Kiriya has Kuroto arrested, the latter changes his name to "Kuroto Dan Shin" (檀 黎斗 神, Dan Kuroto Shin) (Note: In this case, Shin (神) is used as a Sino-Japanese reading of the kanji Kami (神, "god").) to reflect his god complex and continues to advise CR until Masamune and Gamedeus are defeated.

During the events of the web series Kamen Sentai Gorider, which takes place before Kuroto's revival as a Bugster, a backup of him disguises himself as Kazuma Kenzaki to lure the deceased Kiriya, Kaoru Kino, Kaito Kumon, and Yoko Minato into a Game World and use their despair to resurrect himself. However, Emu, the real Kenzaki, and the fallen Riders foil him via the Goriders' power.

During the events of the V-Cinema Kamen Rider Ex-Aid Trilogy: Another Ending, Kuroto uses his last life to initiate a universal apocalypse through a multiplayer survival horror game called Zombie Chronicle (ゾンビクロニクル, Zonbi Kuronikuru). While he is ultimately defeated by Kamen Rider Lazer X, Kuroto regains his sanity before disappearing.

During the events of the two-part web special Kamen Rider Genms: The Presidents, which takes place after the series, an artificial intelligence called the Ark digitally revives Kuroto, who infects Gai Amatsu with a unique strain of the Bugster Virus in order to materialize himself in the physical world and regain control of Gemn Corp. so he can use it for malicious means. While a revived Masamune interrupts Kuroto's plans, Amatsu convinces the Dans to reconcile before the father-and-son pair return to the digital world. Despite this, Kuroto vows to return.

During the events of the web special Kamen Rider Genms: Smart Brain and the 1000% Crisis, Kuroto is revived as a Humagear and manipulates Amatsu into transferring control of the latter's company, Thouser-Intellion, to him under the Ark's orders.

As of the web series Kamen Rider Outsiders, Kuroto created a new company, Genm Musou Corp. (幻夢無双コーポレーション, Genmu Musō Kōporēshon). During the events of the web series, his Humagear body is destroyed by Kamen Rider Zein before Kamen Rider Zero-Three learns Tsumuri's power of creation and revives him as a human.

Utilizing the Proto Mighty Action X (プロトマイティアクションX, Puroto Maiti Akushon Ekkusu) Gashat in conjunction with the Gamer Driver, Kuroto can transform into Kamen Rider Gemn Action Gamer Level 1. In this form, he gains superhuman jumping and can transform further into Action Gamer Level 2. In both forms, he possesses greater power than Emu as Ex-Aid due to Kuroto's Proto Gashat having unlimited powers, though prolonged usage of it will harm him, and wields the Gashacon Bugvisor (ガシャコンバグヴァイザー, Gashakon Baguvaizā), which can switch between Pad Mode (パッドモード, Paddo Mōdo), Beam Gun Mode (ビームガンモード, Bīmu Gan Mōdo), and Chainsaw Mode (チェーンソーモード, Chēnsō Mōdo) as well as absorb Bugsters' data and trap them within it. Moreover, activating Proto Mighty Action X generates a Game Area with several Energy Items randomly hidden inside chocolate block-like containers. He can also combine Proto Mighty Action X with additional Gashats to achieve stronger forms, which are as follows:

- Sports Action Gamer Level 3 (スポーツアクションゲーマーレベル3, Supōtsu Akushon Gēmā Reberu Surī): An auxiliary form accessed from the Proto Mighty Action X and Shakariki Sports (シャカリキスポーツ, Shakariki Supōtsu; Enthusiastic Sports) Gashats that grants the use of the twin Trick Flywheel (トリックフライホイール, Torikku Furaihoīru) throwing discs. The Shakariki Sports Gashat first appears in episode 49 of Kamen Rider Ghost.

After creating the Dangerous Zombie (デンジャラスゾンビ, Denjarasu Zonbi) Gashat, Kuroto combines the Gashacon Bugvisor and the Bugster Buckle (バグスターバックル, Bagusutā Bakkuru) belt to form the Buggle Driver (バグルドライバー, Baguru Doraibā), which he uses in conjunction with the aforementioned Gashat to assume his super form; Zombie Gamer Level X (ゾンビゲーマーレベルX, Zonbi Gēmā Reberu Ten/Ekkusu). In this form, he can command zombie-themed Bugster Viruses created upon Dangerous Zombie's activation, regenerate from injuries, and circumvent death. He also wields the Gashacon Bugvisor, as well as other Gashacon Weapons so long as he possesses the corresponding Gashats. His finishers in this form are the Critical End (クリティカルエンド, Kuritikaru Endo) and the Critical Dead (クリティカルデッド, Kuritikaru Deddo). Using this form, Kuroto allows the other Riders to defeat him in order to absorb more death data and evolve his Rider form into Kamen Rider Genm X (仮面ライダーゲンムX, Kamen Raidā Genmu Ekksu) until Emu uses Maximum Mighty X to remove most of his power.

After being revived as a Bugster, Kuroto utilizes the Proto Mighty Action X Origin (プロトマイティアクションXオリジン, Puroto Maiti Akushon Ekkusu Orijin) Gashat in conjunction with a Gamer Driver to transform into Kamen Rider Gemn Action Gamer Level 0 (Proto Origin) (レベル0 [プロトオリジン], Reberu Zero [Puroto Orijin]). While transformed, he possesses the ability to use his extra lives, nullify the Bugster Virus' effects, weaken Gamer Riders, and wields the Gashacon Bugvisor II and Gashacon Breaker. He can also combine Proto Mighty Action X Origin with additional Gashats to achieve stronger forms, which are as follows:

- Zombie Action Gamer Level X-0 (ゾンビアクションゲーマーレベルX-0, Zonbi Akushon Gēmā Reberu Ekkusu Zero): Kuroto's final form accessed from the Proto Mighty Action X Origin and Dangerous Zombie Gashats that grants increased power compared to his original Zombie Gamer form due to the former Gashat negating the latter's negative side effects.
- Proto Sports Action Gamer Level 0 (プロトスポーツアクションゲーマーレベル0, Puroto Supōtsu Akushon Gēmā Reberu Zero): A special form accessed from the Proto Mighty Action X Origin and Proto Shakariki Sports Gashats that grants similar capabilities as Kuroto's Sports Action Gamer Level 3. This form appears exclusively in the Kamen Rider Lazer Hyper Battle DVD special.

Additionally, Kuroto can assume the following forms by using unique Gashats in place of his regular Gashats:

- Wizard Gamer (ウィザードゲーマー, Wizādo Gēmā) Levels 1 and 2: A chibi-like special form and its subsequent sleeker upgrade, both of which are accessed from the Magic the Wizard (マジックザウィザード, Majikku Za Wizādo) Gashat, that grants increased leg strength. These forms appear exclusively in the web special Kamen Rider Genm: Legend Rider Stage.
- God Maximum Gamer Level Billion (ゴッドマキシマムゲーマーレベルビリオン, Goddo Makishimamu Gēmā Reberu Birion): A special form accessed from the double-sized God Maximum Mighty X (ゴッドマキシマムマイティX, Goddo Makishimamu Maiti Ekkusu) Gashat that transforms Kuroto into his Action Gamer Level 0 form clad in the God Maximum Gama (ゴッドマキシマムゲーマ, Goddo Makishimamu Gēma) exosuit, which is capable of flying, extending its limbs, and grants the ability to summon a horde of his Zombie Gamer form capable of turning people into zombie-themed Bugster Viruses, celestial body manipulation, acidic breath capabilities, and immunity to Kamen Rider Cronus' chronokinesis. He can also separate from and put the God Maximum Gama on autopilot while maintaining his Level Billion power. His finisher in this form is the Critical Blessing (クリティカルブレッシング, Kuritikaru Buresshingu). This form appears exclusively in the V-Cinema Kamen Rider Ex-Aid Trilogy: Another Ending.
- Musou Gamer (無双ゲーマー, Musō Gēmā): A special form accessed from the double-sized Genm Musou (幻夢無双, Genmu Musō; Peerless Illusion) Gashat after absorbing the Ark's data on malice that grants similar capabilities as Kamen Rider Cronus. Kuroto's finisher in this form is the Critical Finale (クリティカルフィナーレ, Kuritikaru Fināre). This form appears exclusively in the web special Kamen Rider Genms: Smart Brain and the 1000% Crisis and the web series Kamen Rider Outsiders.
- Hyper Fumetsu Gamer (ハイパー不滅ゲーマー, Haipā Fumetsu Gēmā): A special form accessed from the double-sized Maximum Zombie (マキシマムゾンビ, Makishimamu Zonbi) Gashat combined with the adapter-like Hyper Fumetsu (ハイパー不滅, Haipā Fumetsu; Hyper Immortal) Gashat that grants immortality. Kuroto's finisher in this form is the Hyper Critical Dead End (ハイパークリティカルデッドエンド, Haipā Kuritikaru Deddo Endo). This form appears exclusively in the web series Kamen Rider Outsiders.

Kuroto Dan is portrayed by Tetsuya Iwanaga (岩永 徹也, Iwanaga Tetsuya). As a teenager, Kuroto is portrayed by Mitsumasa Sato (佐藤 光将, Satō Mitsumasa). Iwanaga's portrayal of Kuroto throughout the series, especially after his character's descent to insanity and eventual revival as a comical maniac, proved highly popular among audiences.

=== Parado ===
Parado (パラド) is a leading Bugster and the first to manifest after Kuroto infected Emu 16 years prior to the series. Unlike the other Bugsters, Parado lacks a monstrous form and is the physical manifestation of Emu's childhood desire for a playmate. As such, the former enjoys fighting his host, though he is also protective of his kind and hateful of humanity's pride. While he was a part of Emu's body, Parado dominated his "Genius Gamer M" persona and helped him enjoy popularity as a gamer.

Five years prior to the series however, Kuroto tasked the Next Genome Institute with extracting the Bugster Virus in Emu's body for his plans. As a result, Parado manifested to protect Emu, with the resulting separation causing the latter to pursue his dream of becoming a doctor while maintaining aspects of his gamer personality due to traces of Parado still being in him.

In the present, Parado joins forces with Kuroto to help him complete the Kamen Rider Chronicle project while occasionally helping Emu. After using Kuroto to become Kamen Rider Para-DX (仮面ライダーパラドクス, Kamen Raidā Paradokusu), Parado eventually abandons and kills him to take over Kamen Rider Chronicle to help the Bugsters eliminate humanity. During this time, Parado re-possesses Emu to obtain a DNA sample to upgrade his Rider powers and force Emu to fight the other Riders until a revived Kuroto defeats the Bugster while seeking revenge. When Masamune Dan reveals he had manipulated everyone involved in Kamen Rider Chronicle and kills one of his fellow Bugsters, Parado becomes fearful of suffering the same fate and confronts Emu, who defeats and reabsorbs him. Acknowledging his fear of death and feeling remorse over his actions, Parado works with Emu to stop Masamune. While he sacrifices himself in order to do so, a fragment of him remained in Emu's body, which he later uses to revive Parado.

In addition to the standard Bugster abilities, Parado possesses the ability to teleport and project force fields. Being Emu's Bugster, Parado can also assume control of the right half of the former's Double Action Gamer Level XX form.

Utilizing the double-sized Gashat Gear Dual (ガシャットギアデュアル, Gashatto Gia Dyuaru), which generates a Game Area with several exposed Energy Items, Parado can transform into Kamen Rider Para-DX. While transformed, he can switch between two Level 50 (レベル50, Reberu Fifuti) forms, which are as follows:

- Puzzle Gamer (パズルゲーマー, Pazuru Gēmā) Level 50: Parado's blue-colored primary form accessed from the Gashat Gear Dual's Perfect Puzzle (パーフェクトパズル, Pāfekuto Pazuru) mode that grants the ability to combine the powers of two or three Energy Items for enhanced attacks, generate energy shields, and nullify other Riders' abilities. His finisher in this form is the Critical Combo (クリティカルコンボ, Kuritikaru Konbo).
- Fighter Gamer (ファイターゲーマー, Faitā Gēmā) Level 50: Parado's red-colored secondary form accessed from the Gashat Gear Dual's Knock Out Fighter (ノックアウトファイター, Nokku Auto Faitā) mode that grants superhuman strength. In this form, he is equipped with a pair of pyrokinetic Materialize Smasher (マテリアライズスマッシャー, Materiaraizu Sumasshā) gauntlets. His finisher in this form is the Critical Smash (クリティカルスマッシュ, Kuritikaru Sumasshu).

After killing Kuroto and taking possession of his Gamer Driver, Parado can use the Gashat Gear Dual in conjunction with the aforementioned belt to assume his final form; Perfect Knock Out Gamer Level 99 (パーフェクトノックアウトゲーマーレベル99, Pāfekuto Nokku Auto Gēmā Reberu Nainti Nain). In this form, he gains the combined powers of his Level 50 forms. He also wields the Gashacon Parabragun (ガシャコンパラブレイガン, Gashakon Parabureigan), which can switch between Axe Mode and Gun Mode. After becoming Emu's partner, Parado can use the Mighty Brothers XX Gashat in conjunction with the Gashacon Parabragun to temporarily split himself into his Level 50 forms. His finishers in this form are the Critical Bomber (クリティカルボンバー, Kuritikaru Bonbā) and enhanced versions of his original Critical Combo and Smash.

During the events of the Kamen Rider Para-DX Hyper Battle DVD special, Parado and Emu use the Knock Out Fighter 2 (ノックアウトファイター2, Nokku Auto Faitā Tsū) Gashat in conjunction with the latter's Gamer Driver to both assume Double Fighter Gamer Level 39 (ダブルファイターゲーマーレベル39, Daburu Faitā Gēmā Reberu Sāti Nain). Their finisher in this form is the Critical Knuckle (クリティカルナックル, Kuritikaru Nakkuru).

Parado is portrayed by Shouma Kai (甲斐 翔真, Kai Shōma).

=== Kiriya Kujo ===
Kiriya Kujo (九条 貴利矢, Kujō Kiriya) is a cunning medical examiner who investigates the Bugsters and their origins as Kamen Rider Lazer (仮面ライダーレーザー, Kamen Raidā Rēzā) both out of curiosity and after losing his friend Jungo Aihara (藍原 淳吾, Aihara Jungo) during Zero Day. In pursuit of his goal, the former discovers Kuroto is Kamen Rider Gemn and reveals his identity to the other Riders, but is eventually killed for it. Prior to this, Kiriya left research for a cure to the Bugster Virus with his colleague, Yoshitaka, who later gives it to Kiriya's allies.

During the events of the web series Kamen Sentai Gorider, Kuroto arranges the resurrection of Kiriya, among other deceased Kamen Riders, to lure Emu into the Game World and kill him. However, Kazuma Kenzaki arrives to help Emu and the revived Riders stop Kuroto. During the fight, Kiriya assumes the form of Kirider before joining the other fallen Riders in sacrificing themselves to defeat Kuroto and ensure Emu and Kenzaki's escape.

Amidst the Kamen Rider Chronicle crisis, Masamune Dan revives Kiriya as a Bugster to serve him. However, the latter secretly works against him before eventually rejoining the Gamer Riders to stop Masamune. Following this, Kiriya is nominated to become an official member of CR and collaborates with Tsukuru Koboshi to develop Bugster Virus vaccines.

During the events of the V-Cinema Kamen Rider Ex-Aid Trilogy: Another Ending, a dying Masamune tasks Kiriya with foiling Kuroto's plot to destroy the universe and nearly dies again, though Hiiro is able to revive Kiriya and restore his humanity.

Prior to his revival in the series, Kiriya's death had become a popular hashtag in Japan's Twitter feed under the slogan, "Why did Kiriya have to Die So Soon?" (なんできりやすぐ死んでしまうん, Nande Kiriya sugu shinde shimaun), based on the advertising slogan of the animated film Grave of the Fireflies. Toei Company took note of this and quickly issued an apology.

Utilizing the Bakusou Bike (爆走バイク, Bakusō Baiku; Burnout Bike) Gashat in conjunction with the Gamer Driver, Kiriya can transform into Kamen Rider Lazer Bike Gamer (バイクゲーマー, Baiku Gēmā) Level 1. In this form, he wields the Front Armed Unit (フロントユニット, Furonto Āmudo Yunitto) brass knuckles and the Rear Armed Unit (リアアームドユニット, Ria Āmudo Yunitto) handgun, can perform spin attacks, and transform further into his motorcycle-like Bike Gamer Level 2 form. Moreover, activating Bakusou Bike generates a Game Area with several Energy Items randomly hidden inside trophy stand-like containers. While he is capable of moving in his Level 2 form and switching back to his Level 1 form on his own, Kiriya requires a partner to help him initiate his finishers. He can also combine Bakusou Bike with additional Gashats to achieve stronger humanoid forms, which are as follows:

- Chambara Bike Gamer Level 3 (チャンバラバイクゲーマーレベル3, Chanbara Baiku Gēmā Reberu Surī): An auxiliary form accessed from the Bakusou Bike and Giri Giri Chambara (ギリギリチャンバラ, Giri Giri Chanbara; Slash Slash Sword Fight) Gashats that grants the use of the Gashacon Sparrow (ガシャコンスパロー, Gashakon Suparō), which can switch between its one-piece Bow Mode (弓モード, Yumi Mōdo) and its two-piece Sickle Mode (鎌モード, Kama Mōdo).
- Hunter Bike Gamer Level 5 (Dragon Claw) (ハンターバイクゲーマーレベル5 [ドラゴンクロー], Hantā Baiku Gēmā Reberu Faibu [Doragon Kurō]): An auxiliary form accessed from the Bakusou Bike and Drago Knight Hunter Z Gashats alongside up to three other Gamer Riders that equips Kiriya with a pair of Drago Knight Claw (ドラゴナイトクロー, Dorago Naito Kurō) sabatons as well as the Drago Knight Blade and Gun.

After being revived by Masamune, Kiriya utilizes the Gamer Driver and Bakusou Bike Gashat to transform into the humanoid Kamen Rider Lazer Turbo (仮面ライダーレーザーターボ, Kamen Raidā Rēzā Tābo) Bike Gamer Level 0 (レベル0, Reberu Zero). While transformed, he gains the ability to nullify the Bugster Virus. He can also wield the Gashacon Sparrow if he is in possession of Giri Giri Chambara. Additionally, Kiriya can combine Bakusou Bike with Proto-Gashats to achieve stronger forms, which are as follows:

- Proto Sports Bike Gamer (プロトスポーツバイクゲーマー, Puroto Supōtsu Baiku Gēmā) Level 0: An auxiliary form accessed from Bakusou Bike and the Proto Shakariki Sports (プロトシャカリキスポーツ, Puroto Shakariki Supōtsu; Proto Enthusiastic Sports) Gashat that grants similar capabilities as Kuroto's Sports Action Gamer Level 3.
- Proto Combat Bike Gamer (プロトコンバットバイクゲーマー, Puroto Konbatto Baiku Gēmā) Level 0: An auxiliary form accessed from Bakusou Bike and the Proto Jet Combat (プロトジェットコンバット, Puroto Jetto Konbatto) Gashat that grants similar capabilities as Taiga's Combat Shooting Gamer Level 3.

During the events of the V-Cinema Kamen Rider Ex-Aid Trilogy: Another Ending, Kiriya utilizes the Giri Giri Chambara Gashat in conjunction with the Buggle Driver II to transform into his humanoid final form; Kamen Rider Lazer X (仮面ライダーレーザーX, Kamen Raidā Rēzā Ekkusu). His finisher in this form is the Critical Crews-Aid.

Kiriya Kujo is portrayed by Hayato Onozuka (小野塚 勇人, Onozuka Hayato).

=== Masamune Dan ===
Masamune Dan (檀 正宗, Dan Masamune) is the original CEO of Genm Corp., the husband of Sakurako, and the father of Kuroto who orchestrated his son's schemes in an attempt to revive his wife after she had been infected with the Bugster Virus. Six years prior to the series, Masamune participated in Emu's life-saving surgery. He developed a god complex before secretly infecting himself with the Bugster Virus, allowed Kuroto to frame him for Zero Day, and willingly went to prison to incubate his virus in peace.

After being cleared of all charges and Kuroto and the Bugsters complete Kamen Rider Chronicle in the present, Masamune reclaims his position as Genm Corp.'s CEO and commercially releases the game so he can mass-produce its Gashats, release them worldwide, and turn its players into data. To further his plans, he also reprograms Kamen Rider Chronicle's final boss, Gamedeus, to obey him. When CR develop the means to defeat Gamedeus and end Kamen Rider Chronicle, Masamune absorbs the Bugster, transforms into Gamedeus Cronus (ゲムデウスクロノス, Gemudeusu Kuronosu), and causes a citywide epidemic, but Poppy and Parado sacrifice themselves to extract Gamedeus from Masamune and allow the Gamer Riders to defeat them. Despite this, Masamune commits suicide by subjecting himself to the Kamen Rider Chronicle Master Gashat's virus, taking it with him to prevent the Riders from freeing the game's victims.

In the V-Cinema Kamen Rider Ex-Aid Trilogy: Another Ending, Kuroto revives Masamune to force him to help the former develop Zombie Chronicle in order to destroy the universe and serve as a host for Black Parado. Masamune later frees himself and attempts to stop Kuroto, but is fatally wounded in battle against his son. Before he dies, Masamune tells Kiriya the truth of how the former and Kuroto were driven to madness before giving Kiriya his Buggle Driver II.

During the events of the two-part web special Kamen Rider Gemn: The Presidents, after an artificial intelligence called the Ark revives Kuroto, who infects ZAIA Enterprise CEO Gai Amatsu with the Bugster Virus, Masamune emerges from Amatsu as a Bugster and fights Kuroto to stop him from using Gemn Corp. for malicious intent. However, Amatsu convinces the Dans to reconcile and the pair return to the digital world in peace.

Utilizing the Kamen Rider Chronicle Master Gashat in conjunction with the Buggle Driver II, Masamune can transform into Kamen Rider Cronus (仮面ライダークロノス, Kamen Raidā Kuronosu). While transformed, he gains the use of the chronokinetic Pause (ポーズ, Pōzu) and Reset (リセット, Risetto) abilities. His finishers are the Critical Crews-Aid, the Critical Judgment (クリティカルジャッジメント, Kuritikaru Jajjimento), & the Critical Sacrifice (クリティカルサクリファイス, Kuritikaru Sakurifaisu). Additionally, his Master Gashat allows him to manipulate Bugsters' lives and control Ride-Player casualties.

As Gamedeus Cronus, he wields Gamedeus' DeuSlasher and Deus Rampart and can transform into the Bugster's Super Gamedeus (超ゲムデウス, Chō Gemudeusu) form, which possesses the extendable Deus Fafnir (デウスファーブニル, Deusu Fābuniru) arms and the sword-like Deuscalibur (デウスカリバー, Deusukaribā) leg.

Masamune Dan is portrayed by Hiroyuki Takami (貴水 博之, Takami Hiroyuki).

== Recurring characters ==
=== Seito University Hospital ===
The Seito University Hospital (聖都大学附属病院, Seito Daigaku Fuzoku Byōin) is a prestigious medical facility that contains the Cyberbrain Room (電脳救命センター, Den'nō Kyūmei Sentā), abbreviated as CR, which operates under the authority of the Ministry of Health (衛生省, Eisei-shō) to isolate and rescue Bugster Virus victims. CR was formed five years prior to the series during Zero Day (ゼロデイ, Zero Dei), before the Bugster infection was made public.

To combat the Bugsters, CR developed Gamer Driver (ゲーマドライバー, Gēma Doraibā) belts and Rider Gashat (ライダーガシャット, Raidā Gashatto) cartridges from technology provided by Gemn Corp. to allow doctors who have been immunized against the Bugster Virus to transform into Kamen Riders. While transformed, they start out in chibi-like armored Level 1 (レベル1, Reberu Wan) forms before they can upgrade into their sleeker and more combat-oriented Level 2 (レベル2, Reberu Tsū) forms via the Level Up (レベルアップ, Reberu Appu) function, change locations via the Stage Select (ステージセレクト, Sutēji Serekuto) function, and perform Critical Strike (クリティカルストライク, Kuritikaru Sutoraiku) finishers via the Kimewaza Slot Holder (キメワザスロットホルダー, Kimewaza Surotto Horudā; Finishing Move Slot Holder) device. They also each carry unique multiform Gashacon Weapons (ガシャコンウェポン, Gashakon Uepon; Special Weapon), which allow them to perform Critical Finish (クリティカルフィニッシュ, Kuritikaru Finisshu) finishers. Moreover, activating their personal Gashats generates a Game Area (ゲームエリア, Gēmu Eria) digital field with several Energy Item (エナジーアイテム, Enajī Aitemu) medals, which possess unique power-ups, randomly hidden inside varying containers.

==== Haima Kagami ====
Haima Kagami (鏡 灰馬, Kagami Haima) is Hiiro's father and the director of the hospital who is in charge of CR.

Haima Kagami is portrayed by Hanamaru Hakata (博多 華丸, Hakata Hanamaru).

==== Kyotaro Hinata ====
Kyotaro Hinata (日向 恭太郎, Hinata Kyōtarō) is the Deputy Director-General of the Ministry of Health and a former doctor. 16 years prior to the series, he performed a life-saving surgery on Emu.

Kyotaro Hinata is portrayed by Hironobu Nomura (野村 宏伸, Nomura Hironobu).

=== Bugsters ===
The Bugsters (バグスター, Bagusutā), also known as Bugster Viruses (バグスターウイルス, Bagusutā Uirusu), are sentient, monstrous, microscopic computer viruses born from the Year 2000 problem that aim to destroy humanity and rule the world. After Kuroto discovered them during the millennium turnover, his father Masamune infected himself with the original Bugster Virus before he manipulated Kuroto into doing the same to Emu in order to breed the Bugsters themselves.

Following Zero Day, the Bugsters are developed from humans infected with the Bugster Virus. Using their host's negative emotions, the monsters are able to take control of them and transform them into giant Bugster Union (バグスターユニオン, Bagusutā Yunion) monsters. Once a Rider extracts the Bugster from the host, the former will manifest in their complete form alongside a group of Bugster Virus foot soldiers while the host will revert to their human form and suffer from the effects of Game Disease (ゲーム病, Gēmu-byō). Unless their corresponding Bugster is destroyed or dealt with quickly, the host will turn into data and the former fully manifests with additional powers, such as the ability to assume human forms. Due to negative emotions fueling the Bugster Virus and Game Disease, stressors can potentially cause the host to spawn additional Bugster Virus foot soldiers or duplicates of the original Bugster monster. If a Bugster's physical body is destroyed without someone absorbing their essence, they will die permanently, though fully manifested Bugsters possess immortality and can be revived multiple times. Despite all of this, a person afflicted with the Bugster Virus or Game Disease can overcome their condition via positive emotions.

After Graphite attempts to cause a second Zero Day, the Bugsters evolve to the point where they can attain their monstrous forms without assuming Bugster Union forms, retain memories from past battles, "level up" along with the Gamer Riders, take over their host's body by killing their mind, and eventually, the ability to manifest without a host.

Being born from video games, the Bugsters behave similarly to artificial intelligences and follow their corresponding games' rules. As such, some take on an antagonistic role and fight their hosts while others behave like support characters and aid their hosts. Regardless of whether they are in opposition or cooperation with each other, they all follow the rules and treat each other fairly.

==== Graphite ====
The Graphite Bugster (グラファイトバグスター, Gurafaito Bagusutā), or simply Graphite (グラファイト, Gurafaito), is a draconic warrior-themed leading Bugster who was born from the Drago Knight Hunter Z Gashat's data and Saki Momose five years prior to the series. Due to her death, Graphite formed a rivalry with Hiiro, her boyfriend, and Taiga, the doctor who failed to save her.

In the present, Graphite emerges to monitor Bugster Virus infection rates and battle the Gamer Riders. After losing face with Kuroto, Graphite steals the Proto Drago Knight Hunter Z Gashat to evolve himself and attempts to spread the Bugster Virus on a larger scale, only to be defeated by Kamen Riders Ex-Aid, Brave, Snipe, and Lazer. A year later, Parado resurrects Graphite and evolves him further so he can help the Bugsters use Kamen Rider Chronicle to replace humanity with more of their kind. When Masamune takes over Kamen Rider Chronicle for himself, Graphite obtains a sample of the game's final boss, Gamedeus, and infects himself with it to cultivate the virus. Graphite eventually faces Hiiro and Taiga in a final battle amidst Masamune's attempts to keep him alive and prolong Kamen Rider Chronicle, and allowing Nico Saiba to defeat him as she had earned the right to do so while playing Kamen Rider Chronicle. Before he dies, Graphite thanks his allies and enemies for allowing him to fulfill his role as a video game character.

In addition to the standard Bugster abilities, Graphite wields the double-bladed Graphite Fang (グラファイトファング, Gurafaito Fangu) naginata, which allows him to perform the Dragon Fang of Rage (激怒竜牙, Gekido Ryūga) finisher. He initially starts the series in a green-colored form via the Gashacon Bugvisor, which allows him to switch between his human and Bugster forms and infect people with the Bugster Virus. As the series progresses, he evolves into the following forms:

- Dark Graphite Bugster (ダークグラファイトバグスター, Dāku Gurafaito Bagusutā): A black-colored evolution Graphite achieved from the Proto Drago Knight Hunter Z (プロトドラゴナイトハンターZ, Puroto Dorago Naito Hantā Zetto) Gashat after Kuroto revoked his Bugvisor that grants increased power. His finisher in this form is the Do-Do-Do Dark Dragon Sword (ドドド黒龍剣, Dododo Kokuryū-ken).
- Guren Graphite Bugster (グレングラファイトバグスター, Guren Gurafaito Bagusutā) Level 99: A crimson-colored evolution Graphite achieved following his resurrection that grants significantly increased power compared to his previous form, pyrokinesis, and the use of the Guren Graphite Fang (グレングラファイトファング, Guren Gurafaito Fangu). After exposing himself to Gamedeus' Bugster Virus, Graphite gains immunity to Kamen Rider Cronus' chronokinesis. His finisher in this form is the (Do-Do-Do-Do-Do-Do-) Do-Do-Do-Do-Do Crimson Exploding Dragon Sword ((ドドドドドド) ドドドドド紅蓮爆龍剣, (Dodododododo) Dododododo Guren Bakuryū-ken).

Graphite is portrayed by Shouma Machii (町井 祥真, Machii Shōma).

==== Lovrica ====
The Lovrica Bugster (ラヴリカバグスター, Ravurika Bagusutā), or simply Lovrica (ラヴリカ, Ravurika), is a manipulative Bugster born from the data of the Toki Meki Crisis Gashat who assumes the human identity of Ren Amagasaki (天ヶ崎 恋, Amagasaki Ren) to take over Gemn Corp. on the Bugsters' behalf and help them use Kamen Rider Chronicle to replace humanity with their kind. He brainwashes Poppy to assist them further, but Masamune negates Lovrica's powers and kills him.

During the events of the V-Cinema Kamen Rider Ex-Aid Trilogy: Another Ending, Lovrica is revived amidst CR's attempts to revive Bugster Virus victims and infects an American gamer named Luke Kidman (ルーク＝キッドマン, Rūku Kiddoman). After manipulating a similarly revived Saki Momose, however, he is killed once more by Kamen Riders Brave and Snipe.

In addition to the standard Bugster abilities, Lovrica can alter other Bugsters' minds and breathe fire in his human form. In his Bugster form, he can create Bugster Virus groupies called Lovely Girls (ラヴリーガールズ, Ravurī Gāruzu) to support him and possesses immunity against conventional attacks due to Toki Meki Crisis lacking a combat mechanic. Despite this, he becomes vulnerable if he is rejected by the woman or women he is flirting with or his Lovely Girls are deleted. In both forms, he wields the Gashacon Bugvisor, which he can use to switch between his two forms and infect people with the Bugster Virus.

The Lovrica Bugster is voiced by Junichi Suwabe (諏訪部 順一, Suwabe Jun'ichi), who also serves as the series' narrator, while Ren Amagasaki is portrayed by Shinya Kote (小手 伸也, Kote Shinya). In his initial cameo as Amagasaki, Lovrica is portrayed by an unidentified stand-in.

==== Gamedeus ====
The Gamedeus Bugster (ゲムデウスバグスター, Gemudeusu Bagusutā), or simply Gamedeus (ゲムデウス, Gemudeusu), is the final boss of Kamen Rider Chronicle who only appears once all of the game's Gashatrophies (ガシャットロフィー, Gashattorofī) are collected and is reputed to be so powerful that only Kamen Rider Cronus can defeat him. Masamune reprograms Gamedeus to spread the Bugster Virus across Japan, but the former's son Kuroto and Kiriya create the Doctor Mighty XX Gashat to negate Gamedeus' effects via an antivirus. In response, Masamune merges with the Bugster to become Gamedeus Cronus, only for the latter to be freed by Poppy and destroyed by Parado.

In addition to the standard Bugster abilities, Gamedeus possesses all of the other Bugsters' powers and wields the DeuSlasher (デウスラッシャー, Deusurasshā) sword and the Deus Rampart (デウスランパート, Deusu Ranpāto) shield.

Gamedeus is voiced by Masashi Sugawara (菅原 正志, Sugawara Masashi).

==== Minor Bugsters ====
- Salty Bugster (ソルティバグスター, Soruti Bagusutā): A Bugster born from the Mighty Action X Gashat's data who is equipped with the Salty Knuckle (ソルティナックル, Soruti Nakkuru) gauntlet. He infects Emu's patient Sōta Suyama (須山 颯太, Suyama Sōta) and manifests in his Level 1 form before Salty is destroyed by Kamen Rider Ex-Aid. Salty later returns in his Level 3 form after infecting eight-year old Shūhei Yamanaka (山中 周平, Yamanaka Shūhei), only to be destroyed once more by Kamen Riders Ex-Aid and Brave and Poppy before Parado absorbs Salty's essence into a Gashacon Bugvisor. Amidst the Kamen Rider Chronicle crisis, Salty returns in his Level 10 form as part of the game, only to be destroyed by Brave and Ride-Player Nico and later permanently deleted by Masamune. The Salty Bugster is voiced by Takeshi Maeda (前田 剛, Maeda Takeshi).
- Alhambra Bugster (アランブラバグスター, Aranbura Bagusutā): A Bugster born from the Taddle Quest Gashat who wields the Alhambra Staff (アランブラスタッフ, Aranbura Sutaffu). He infects Rensuke Natori (名取 蓮介, Natori Rensuke) before manifesting in his Level 1 form and attempts to kidnap Natori's fiancé, Asami Gōda (豪田 麻美, Gōda Asami), only to be destroyed by Kamen Riders Ex-Aid and Brave. After infecting Kazuki Shirakawa (白河 一樹, Shirakawa Kazuki), a surgeon who is dying of cancer, Alhambra manifests in his Level 10 form to take revenge on Brave, only to be destroyed by Ex-Aid before Kamen Rider Gemn downloads the Bugster's essence into a Gashacon Bugvisor. Amidst the Kamen Rider Chronicle crisis, Alhambra returns in his Level 50 form, but is destroyed by Ride-Player Nico. The Alhambra Bugster is voiced by Dai Matsumoto (松本 大, Matsumoto Dai).
- Revol Bugster (リボルバグスター, Riboru Bagusutā): A Bugster born from the Bang Bang Shooting Gashat who is equipped with the right arm-mounted Revol Arm (リボルアーム, Riboru Āmu) machine gun and can produce clones of and camouflage himself. He infects Yūki Kitami (北見 勇樹, Kitami Yūki) before manifesting in his Level 1 form to act on the latter's fear of doctors by killing them, only to be destroyed by Kamen Rider Snipe. After Nico Saiba steals Snipe's Rider equipment to fight Ex-Aid, unaware of its requirements, she becomes infected by Revol, who immediately manifests in his Level 5 form. Due to him fighting the Riders and Bugsters alike while acting on Nico's desire, Kamen Rider Para-DX destroys Revol before Kamen Rider Gemn downloads his essence into a Gashacon Bugvisor. Revol briefly returns amidst the Kamen Rider Chronicle crisis, but is destroyed by Ride-Player Nico. The Revol Bugster is voiced by Tetsu Inada (稲田 徹, Inada Tetsu).
- Motors Bugster (モータスバグスター, Mōtasu Bagusutā): A Bugster born from the Bakusou Bike Gashat who possesses the Motors Viper (モータスヴァイパー, Mōtasu Vaipā) motorcycle. He infects Yoshitaka Nishiwaki (西脇 嘉高, Nishiwaki Yoshitaka) and manifests in his Level 1 form, but is destroyed by Kamen Rider Gemn to impede Kamen Rider Lazer's investigation into the Bugsters. Gemn later infects Tsukuru Koboshi with Motors, who manifests in his Level 5 form to attack Gemn Corp. employees who support Koboshi and accelerate Ex-Aid's Game Disease. With his task complete, Gemn destroys Motors. Motors later infects rock musician Sora Iwamoto (岩本 ソラ, Iwamoto Sora) and manifests in his Level 20 form, only to be destroyed by Kamen Rider Ex-Aid. Motors briefly returns during the Kamen Rider Chronicle crisis, but is destroyed by Kamen Rider Brave. The Motors Bugster is voiced by Shintarō Ōhata (大畑 伸太郎, Ōhata Shintarō).
- Collabos Bugsters (コラボスバグスター, Korabosu Bagusutā): A series of Bugsters born from Armor-type Gashats, which they house in a slot on their heads to acquire armor and weaponry.
  - The first Collabos Bugster infects music college student Yōko Horiuchi (堀内 曜子, Horiuchi Yōko) and uses the Gekitotsu Robots Gashat to equip himself with the CollaboSmasher (コラボスマッシャー, Korabosumasshā) gauntlet after manifesting. He is destroyed by Kamen Rider Ex-Aid, who retrieves the Gashat for his own use.
  - The second Collabos Bugster also infects and manifests from Horiuchi before using the DoReMiFa Beat Gashat to equip himself with the shoulder-mounted CollaboSounder (コラボサウンダー, Korabosaundā) speakers. He is destroyed by Kamen Rider Brave, who retrieves the Gashat for his own use.
  - The third Collabos Bugster infects restricted elderly parent, Yoshio Okada (岡田 誉士夫, Okada Yoshio) before manifesting and using the Giri Giri Chambara Gashat to gain the use of the CollaboSword (コラボスウォード, Korabosuwōdo) katana. He is destroyed by Kamen Riders Ex-Aid and Lazer, who retrieve the Gashat for the latter's use.
  - The fourth Collabos Bugster also infects and manifests from Okada before using the Jet Combat Gashat to equip himself with the CollaboStraJet (コラボストラジェット, Korabosutorajetto) jetpack. After defeating him and retrieving the Gashat for his own use, Kamen Rider Snipe uses the weakened Collabos Bugster as bait to lure in Kamen Riders Ex-Aid and Brave before destroying the Bugster while attempting to kill the former.
  - During the events of the Kamen Rider Gemn web series, the titular character summons a fifth Collabos Bugster and has them use the Proto Gekitotsu Robots and Proto Giri Giri Chambara Gashats to transform into the Robol and Giril Bugster respectively to collect data on legendary Kamen Riders. After Kamen Rider Ex-Aid defeats it twice, Gemn uses the Bugster to summon digital copies of Kamen Riders W, OOO, and Fourze to fight Ex-Aid, though he is able to overcome them and destroy the Bugster.
- Burgermon Bugster (バガモンバグスター, Bagamon Bagusutā): A Bugster born from the Ju Ju Burger Gashat's data. Despite infecting the game's creator, Tsukuru Koboshi, Burgermon proves friendly and harmless so long as he is fed large quantities of burgers. After Kamen Rider Ex-Aid satisfies Burgermon's appetite, Koboshi's Game Disease subsides. However, Kamen Rider Gemn attacks Koboshi for using his personal terminals, leading to Burgermon sacrificing himself to save the latter. After Koboshi becomes the CEO of Gemn Corp., he posthumously makes Burgermon a company mascot. The Burgermon Bugster is voiced by Tsuyoshi Koyama (小山 剛志, Koyama Tsuyoshi).
- Gatton Bugster (ガットンバグスター, Gatton Bagusutā): A Bugster born from the Gekitotsu Robots Gashat who is equipped with the Gatton Smasher (ガットンスマッシャー, Gatton Sumasshā) gauntlet. He infects a buyō dancer named Mai Yamato (山戸 舞, Yamato Mai) before manifesting around her in his Level 30 form, only to be separated from his host and destroyed by Kamen Rider Brave. Gatton briefly returns amidst the Kamen Rider Chronicle crisis, but is destroyed by Ride-Player Nico. The Gatton Bugster is voiced by Yūichi Iguchi (井口 祐一, Iguchi Yūichi).
- Vernier Bugster (バーニアバグスター, Bānia Bagusutā): A Bugster born from the Jet Combat Gashat's data who is equipped with the VerniAassault Jet (バーニアサルトジェット, Bāniasaruto Jetto) jetpack. He infects acrophobic high school student Daisuke Egami (江上 大介, Egami Daisuke) before manifesting around him in his Level 30 form, only to be separated from his host and destroyed by Kamen Rider Snipe. Vernier later infects a rock musician named Shido (シド) and manifests around him in his Level 40 form before he is separated from his host once more and destroyed by Kamen Rider Brave. Vernier briefly returns amidst the Kamen Rider Chronicle crisis, but is destroyed by Snipe and Ride-Player Nico. The Vernier Bugster is voiced by Kenichirou Matsuda (松田 健一郎, Matsuda Kenichirō).
- Kaiden Bugster (カイデンバグスター, Kaiden Bagusutā): A Bugster born from the Giri Giri Chambara Gashat's data who dual wields the twin Kaiden Sword - Sou (カイデンスウォード・双, Kaiden Suwōdo Sō) katanas. He infects a stubborn detective named Heiji Uesugi (上杉 平次, Uesugi Heiji) before manifesting around him in his Level 30 form, only to be separated from his host and destroyed by Kamen Rider Brave. Kaiden later infects a rock musician named Shishido (シシド) and manifests around him in his Level 40 form, but is separated from his host once more and destroyed by Kamen Rider Snipe. Kaiden briefly returns amidst the Kamen Rider Chronicle in his Level 60 form, but is destroyed by Kamen Rider Ex-Aid. The Kaiden Bugster is voiced by Otoya Kawano (かわの をとや, Kawano Otoya).
- Charlie Bugster (チャーリーバグスター, Chārī Bagusutā): A Bugster born from the Shakariki Sports Gashat's data who possesses the Charlie's Cycle (チャーリーズサイクル, Chārīzu Saikuru) bicycle and built-in springs that grant enhanced agility. To escape police custody, Kuroto infects himself with Charlie, who manifests around the former in his Level 30 form before being separated from his host and destroyed by Kamen Rider Ex-Aid. Charlie briefly returns amidst the Kamen Rider Chronicle crisis, but is destroyed by Ride-Player Nico. The Charlie Bugster is voiced by Yuuki Anai (穴井 勇輝, Anai Yūki).

=== Saki Momose ===
Saki Momose (百瀬 小姫, Momose Saki) is a deceased medical student at Seito University and Hiiro's girlfriend. Five years prior to the series, Kuroto secretly infected her with the Bugster Virus and provoked her into worsening her condition, which she kept secret from Hiiro so as not to distract him from his work and due to him treating her coldly. Taiga attempted to save her, but due to being weakened from his use of a Proto Gashat, he was unable to save her nor stop the emerging Graphite. Before she died and turned into data stored in the Proto Drago Knight Hunter Z Gashat, she asked Hiiro to become the greatest doctor in the world.

In the present, Masamune steals the Proto Gashats from the Ministry of Health and bribes Hiiro into helping him maintain Kamen Rider Chronicle by promising to restore Saki. After the former threatens to delete her data unless the latter willfully botches a surgery meant to save Taiga however, Hiiro chooses to maintain his integrity as a doctor and refuses, leading to Masamune seemingly deleting Saki's data.

During the events of the V-Cinema Kamen Rider Ex-Aid Trilogy: Another Ending, Kuroto temporarily resurrects Momose, but a similarly revived Lovrica subsequently brainwashes her. Hiiro and Taiga succeed in defeating the Bugster and freeing her, only to learn of what Kuroto did. Despite this, Momose tells Hiiro she had forgiven him for how he treated her and gives him the strength to come to terms with her death before she dies once more.

Saki Momose is portrayed by Kana Nakagawa (中川 可菜, Nakagawa Kana).

=== Nico Saiba ===
Nico Saiba (西馬 ニコ, Saiba Niko), also known by her gaming tag "N", is a young tomboy and professional fighting game player who holds a grudge against Emu for defeating her in a Tekken tournament six years prior to the series. In pursuit of getting revenge on him, she appears before and latches onto Taiga, much to his annoyance. Amidst the Kamen Rider Chronicle crisis, Saiba becomes Ride-Player Nico (ライドプレイヤーニコ, Raido Pureiyā Niko) to clear the game using her gaming strategies and discovers Emu's Bugster Parado is her real rival. After being nearly killed by the crisis' mastermind Masamune, however, she resumes her high school education, graduates, and goes on to become Taiga's assistant.

Nico Saiba is portrayed by Reina Kurosaki (黒崎 レイナ, Kurosaki Reina). As a 12-year-old girl, she is portrayed by Noa Miyano (宮野 叶愛, Miyano Noa).

=== Tsukuru Koboshi ===
Tsukuru Koboshi (小星 作, Koboshi Tsukuru) is a video game developer for Gemn Corp.'s development team who spent five years developing the Rider Gashats. Following the apparent death of company CEO, Kuroto Dan, and Gemn Corp. suffering financial problems, Koboshi attempts to keep the company afloat by developing a new game called Ju Ju Burger. With support from his coworkers on the development team and the new CEO, Ren Amagasaki, they complete the game using Kuroto's private terminals, though Koboshi is infected with the Bugster Virus. The Burgermon Bugster emerges from Koboshi as a result, but he embraces it as a friend after seeing the monster is based on one of Ju Ju Burger's characters. When Burgermon inadvertently causes panic outside Gemn Corp. Koboshi and Emu intervene, but Kuroto kills Burgermon and confiscates the Ju Ju Burger Gashat in retaliation for someone creating a game without his permission. While mourning Burgermon, Koboshi is recruited by Taiga to develop the Maximum Mighty X Gashat so Emu can defeat Kuroto. Following this, Koboshi eventually becomes the new CEO of Gemn Corp. and posthumously makes Burgermon a company mascot.

Tsukuru Koboshi is portrayed by Shohei Uno (宇野 祥平, Uno Shōhei).

=== Ride-Players ===
The Ride-Players (ライドプレイヤー, Raido Pureiyā) are civilians infected with the Bugster Virus who transform using mass-produced Kamen Rider Chronicle Gashats and initially wield Ride Weapons (ライドウエポン, Raido Uepon), which can switch between Sword Mode (ソードモード, Sōdo Mōdo) and Gun Mode, until they steal the Gamer Riders' Gashats to access the corresponding Gashacon Weapon. As participants of the Kamen Rider Chronicle event however, defeated players face the risk of being turned into data saved on Proto Gashats and fueling the Bugsters' plot to eliminate humanity or dying from the Bugster Virus if they quit the event without having defeated an opponent.

== Guest characters ==
- Mizuki Nishikikōji (錦小路 みずき, Nishikikōji Mizuki) and Satsuki Ōgimachi (正親町 さつき, Ōgimachi Satsuki): Nurses who work as assistants to Hiiro at Seito University Hospital after he saved their lives following an accident. Mizuki Nishikikōji and Satsuki Ōgimachi are portrayed by Megumi Mizoguchi (溝口 恵, Mizoguchi Megumi) and Mayuna Saburi (佐分利 眞由奈, Saburi Mayuna) respectively.
- Lucky (ラッキー, Rakkī): An interstellar traveler with incredible luck and field leader of the Kyurangers who can transform into Shishi Red (シシレッド, Shishi Reddo). He briefly arrives on Earth to help Emu defeat the Motors, Gatton, and Kaiden Bugsters. Lucky and his fellow Kyurangers would later join forces with the Gamer Riders again to defeat the terrorist organization Shocker during the events of the crossover film Kamen Rider × Super Sentai: Ultra Super Hero Taisen. Lucky is portrayed by Takumi Kizu (岐洲 匠, Kizu Takumi), who reprises his role from Uchu Sentai Kyuranger.
- Kamen Rider Build (仮面ライダービルド, Kamen Raidā Birudo): A Kamen Rider from an alternate universe whose true identity is the "demon scientist" Takumi Katsuragi (葛城 巧, Katsuragi Takumi) before he became involved in an alien conspiracy and had his memories and face altered into the amnesiac genius scientist Sento Kiryu (桐生 戦兎, Kiryū Sento). In episode 44 of the series and the film Kamen Rider Ex-Aid the Movie: True Ending, Katsuragi traveled to Emu's universe to steal his Rider powers in the hopes of stopping Kaisei Mogami from destroying both of their universes. Two years later, after becoming Sento and during the events of the crossover film Kamen Rider Heisei Generations Final: Build & Ex-Aid with Legend Rider, he temporarily uses Emu's powers to battle Mogami's Nebula Bugsters before he is confronted by Parado. Sento eventually returns Emu's powers to him before joining forces with him and both of their allies to stop Mogami. Kamen Rider Build is voiced by Atsuhiro Inukai (犬飼 貴丈, Inukai Atsuhiro), ahead of his appearance in his self-titled TV series.

== Spin-off characters ==
=== Next Genome Institute ===
The Next Genome Institute (ネクストゲノム研究所, Nekusuto Genomu Kenkyūjo) is a transhumanist institute that conducted groundbreaking and innovative research on genomes via the Genome Project (ゲノムプロジェクト, Genomu Purojekuto), though their methods are considered unethical and rumors of them committing horrific experiments have spread. Six years prior to the series, the group was approached by Kuroto to extract the Bugster Virus from Emu's body. However, this resulted in the creation of Parado while the scientists were infected with Game Disease, sent to the Game World to be reborn as Bugsters, and presumed missing. The group resurfaces in the crossover film Kamen Rider Heisei Generations: Dr. Pac-Man vs. Ex-Aid & Ghost with Legend Rider to steal the Proto-Gashats from a compliant Kuroto in order to create the ultimate life form.

==== Michihiko Zaizen ====
Michihiko Zaizen (財前 美智彦, Zaizen Michihiko) is an authority on gene therapy and the director of the Next Genome Institute. Assuming the identity of Dr. Pac-Man (Dr.パックマン, Dokutā Pakkuman), Zaizen uses a Gashacon Bugvisor he stole from Genm Corp. to spread the Pac-Man Virus (パックマンウイルス, Pakkuman Uirusu) and identify carriers of a new strain of the Bugster Virus. Once he captures Tōgo Kiyomiya, Zaizen splices the youth's Bugster strain with his digitized DNA to transform into the ultimate lifeform, Genomes (ゲノムス, Genomusu), before attempting to turn Tōgo into another Genomes, intending to repeat the process and turn all humans into disease-resistant beings. However, he is killed by Kamen Rider Ex-Aid.

Michihiko Zaizen is portrayed by Shirō Sano (佐野 史郎, Sano Shirō).

==== Sōji Kuruse ====
Sōji Kuruse (来瀬 荘司, Kuruse Sōji) is a former doctor and member of the Next Genome Institute who uses the Proto Gekitotsu Robots (プロトゲキトツロボッツ, Puroto Gekitotsu Robottsu; Proto Clash Robots) Gashat to transform into the Robol Bugster (ロボルバグスター, Roboru Bagusutā). He is defeated by Kamen Rider Drive.

Sōji Kuruse is portrayed by Hiroshi Tanahashi (棚橋 弘至, Tanahashi Hiroshi).

==== Kazushige Ryūzaki ====
Kazushige Ryūzaki (竜崎 一成, Ryūzaki Kazushige) is a former doctor and member of the Next Genome Institute who uses the Proto Drago Knight Hunter Z Gashat to transform into the Doral Bugster (ドラルバグスター, Doraru Bagusutā). He is defeated by Kamen Rider Wizard.

Kazushige Ryūzaki is portrayed by Suzunosuke (鈴之助).

==== Ageha Takeda ====
Ageha Takeda (武田 上葉, Takeda Ageha) is a former doctor and member of the Next Genome Institute who uses the Proto Giri Giri Chambara (プロトギリギリチャンバラ, Puroto Giri Giri Chanbara; Proto Slash Slash Sword Fight) Gashat to transform into the Giril Bugster (ギリルバグスター, Giriru Bagusutā). She is defeated by Kamen Rider Gaim.

Ageha Takeda is portrayed by Chihiro Yamamoto (山本 千尋, Yamamoto Chihiro).

=== Tōgo Kiyomiya ===
Tōgo Kiyomiya (清宮 東吾, Kiyomiya Tōgo) is a high school student and computer programming prodigy who developed the Hate Sate Puzzle (ハテサテパズル, Hate Sate Pazuru; Well Well Puzzle) video game and appears exclusively in the crossover film Kamen Rider Heisei Generations: Dr. Pac-Man vs. Ex-Aid & Ghost with Legend Rider. Due to his being a carrier of a new strain of the Bugster Virus, the Next Genome Institute kidnap Kiyomiya, but the latter is rescued by Kamen Riders Ex-Aid, Ghost, Drive, Gaim, and Wizard.

Tōgo Kiyomiya is portrayed by Akira Takano (高野 洸, Takano Akira).

=== Hatena ===
The Hatena Bugster (ハテナバグスター, Hatena Bagusutā) is a Bugster born from the data of the Hate Sate Puzzle video game who wields the Puzzle Rod (パズルロッド, Pazuru Roddo). First appearing in the crossover film Kamen Rider Heisei Generations: Dr. Pac-Man vs. Ex-Aid & Ghost with Legend Rider, he infects and manifests from Tōgo Kiyomiya before he is killed by Kamen Rider Ghost.

During the events of the Kamen Rider Para-DX Hyper Battle DVD special, Kuroto recreates the Hatena Bugster to serve as a boss for his adventure game, Nazotoki Labyrinth (ナゾトキラビリンス, Nazotoki Rabirinsu; Riddle-Solving Labyrinth). However, the latter is killed by Kamen Riders Ex-Aid and Para-DX.

The Hatena Bugster is voiced by Hiroshi Naka (中 博史, Naka Hiroshi) in Heisei Generations and by Katsuyuki Konishi (小西 克幸, Konishi Katsuyuki) in Kamen Rider Para-DX.

=== Foundation X researcher ===
An unidentified Foundation X researcher who appears exclusively in the web special Kamen Rider Brave: Survive! The Revived Beast Rider Squad. He visits the Seito University Hospital to secretly provide them the Night of Safari Gashat in order to see how Emu would use its power. While Hiiro ends up finding and using it instead, the researcher eventually recovers the Gashat and deems the experiment a success before contacting his superiors to begin conducting research into other Gashats.

The Foundation X researcher is portrayed by suit actor Kazuya Okada (岡田 和也, Okada Kazuya).

=== Another Hiiro ===
Another Hiiro (もう一人の飛彩, Mō Hitori no Hiiro) is a version of Hiiro born from the latter's guilt over failing to save Eito Kirino capable of traveling back and forth between the world of the Ultra Super Hero Taisen video game and the real world who appears exclusively in the crossover film Kamen Rider × Super Sentai: Ultra Super Hero Taisen.

Utilizing the Taddle Legacy (タドルレガシー, Tadoru Regashī) Gashat in conjunction with the Gamer Driver, Another Hiiro can transform into Kamen Rider True Brave (仮面ライダートゥルーブレイブ, Kamen Raidā Turū Bureibu). While transformed, he wields the Flamber Saber (フランベルセイバー, Furanberu Seibā).

Like the original Hiiro Kagami, Another Hiiro is also portrayed by Toshiki Seto.

=== Eito Kirino ===
Eito Kirino (霧野 エイト, Kirino Eito) is a closed-minded boy and programming prodigy who appears exclusively in the crossover film Kamen Rider × Super Sentai: Ultra Super Hero Taisen. Born without emotions, he was infected with a disease that slowly digitized him and came into Hiiro's care, but died after refusing to allow Hiiro to operate on him. Failing to see anything beautiful about the real world, Kirino created the Ultra Super Hero Taisen video game in order to destroy it. Through Hiiro, Emu, Poppy, and the similarly emotionless Naga Ray's efforts however, Kirino is able to experience emotions and smile for the first time.

Eito Kirino is portrayed by Riku Ōnishi (大西 利空, Ōnishi Riku).

=== Shocker Leader III ===
Shocker Leader III (ショッカー首領三世, Shokkā Shuryō Sansei) is the new leader of Shocker who can transform into his true form, the Oogumo Great Leader (大蜘蛛大首領, Ōgumo Daishuryō), and appears exclusively in the crossover film Kamen Rider × Super Sentai: Ultra Super Hero Taisen. After being defeated off-screen by past Kamen Riders, he takes refuge in the Game World before resurfacing in the present as a boss for the Ultra Super Hero Taisen video game's Ultra Shocker Taisen (超ショッカー大戦, Chō Shokkā Taisen) bonus stage. He is defeated by an enlarged Kamen Rider Ex-Aid and two duplicates of the Kyurangers' mecha KyurenOh.

Shocker Leader III is portrayed by Diamond Yukai (ダイアモンド✡ユカイ, Daiamondo Yukai).

=== Goriders ===
Kamen Sentai Gorider (仮面戦隊ゴライダー, Kamen Sentai Goraidā) is a Kamen Rider/Super Sentai hybrid team who appear in the crossover film Kamen Rider × Super Sentai: Ultra Super Hero Taisen and a self-titled web series. Consisting of the red-colored Akarider (アカライダー, Akaraidā), the blue-colored Aorider (アオライダー, Aoraidā), the yellow-colored Kirider (キライダー, Kiraidā), the pink-colored Momorider (モモライダー, Momoraidā) and the green-colored Midorider (ミドライダー, Midoraidā), they incorporate aspects of the first Sentai team Himitsu Sentai Gorenger and the Double Riders from the original Kamen Rider series and transform via Gorider cards. In battle, the team wields a finned, multicolored grenade called the Rider Hurricane (ライダーハリケーン, Raidā Harikēn), (Note: Alternatively known as the Gorider Ball (ゴライダーボール, Goraidā Bōru).) which they primarily use to perform finishers.

- In Ultra Super Hero Taisen, Team Ex-Aid (チーム・エグゼイド, Chīmu Eguzeido) members Emu Hojo, Yakumo Kato, Masato Jin, Momotaros, and Shuichi Kitaoka become Akarider, Aorider, Kirider, Momorider, and Midorider respectively upon winning the Ultra Super Hero Taisen tournament.
- In the Kamen Sentai Gorider series, Emu transforms Kaito Kumon, Kazuma Kenzaki, Kiriya Kujo, Yoko Minato, and Kaoru Kino into Akarider, Aorider, Kirider, Momorider, and Midorider respectively to assist him in defeating a backup copy of Kuroto and his monstrous ally Totema.

=== Totema ===
Totema (トーテマ, Tōtema) is a mysterious monster who appears in the web series Kamen Sentai Gorider. He was developed by Kuroto to serve as the invincible final boss for his unbeatable game as well as lure in five deceased Kamen Riders so Kuroto can use them to revive himself. Despite possessing the ability to reconstruct himself if he is destroyed, Totema is destroyed by Kamen Rider Ex-Aid and Kamen Sentai Gorider.

Totema is voiced by Kazuki Yao (矢尾 一樹, Yao Kazuki) while Ruka Matsuda, who also portrays Poppy Pipopapo, portrays his maid NPC disguise.

=== Machina Vision ===
Machina Vision (マキナビジョン, Makina Bijon) is a foreign video game company that develops advanced VR technology and cooperated with Genm Corp. in the distribution of Kamen Rider Chronicle in exchange for a Gamer Driver from Masamune. However, their deal fell through after Masamune discovered Machina Vision CEO Johnny Maxima had no intention of upholding his end. A year after Masamune's death, Machina Vision hacks Genm Corp.'s servers to steal data on the Gamer Driver and Rider Gashats.

==== Kagenari Nagumo ====
Kagenari Nagumo (南雲 影成, Nagumo Kagenari) is a Machina Vision executive who seeks to integrate humanity with virtual reality to create an "eternal heaven" for his daughter Madoka Hoshi and appears exclusively in the film Kamen Rider Ex-Aid the Movie: True Ending. To achieve his goal, he infects people with a new type of virus to trap their consciousnesses in a virtual reality world and attempts to destroy the real world. After being foiled by Kamen Rider Ex-Aid and his allies, Nagumo chooses to stay in the VR world with Madoka.

Utilizing the Hurricane Ninja (ハリケーンニンジャ, Harikēn Ninja) Gashat in conjunction with the Gamer Driver, Nagumo can transform into Kamen Rider Fuma (仮面ライダー風魔, Kamen Raidā Fūma). While transformed, he gains the ability to throw energy shuriken. He also dual wields the twin Fuma Souzantou (風魔双斬刀, Fūma Sōzantō; Fuma Dual Slashing Swords) ninjatō and the Gashacon Bugvisor.

Kagenari Nagumo is portrayed by Yoshikuni Dōchin (堂珍 嘉邦, Dōchin Yoshikuni) of Chemistry.

==== Ninja-Players ====
The Ninja-Players (忍者プレイヤー, Ninja Pureiyā) are Nagumo's henchmen consisting of individuals that he infected who appear exclusively in the film Kamen Rider Ex-Aid the Movie: True Ending. Similarly to the Ride-Players and Nagumo, they all wield a short ninjatō called Genin Weapons (ゲニンウエポン, Genin Uepon; Lower Ninja Weapon) and virus-loaded energy shurikens respectively.

==== Johnny Maxima ====
Johnny Maxima (ジョニー・マキシマ, Jonī Makishima) is the mysterious CEO of Machina Vision who aligned himself with Masamune amidst the Kamen Rider Chronicle crisis. After stealing Graphite's Gashacon Bugvisor near the end of the crisis during the series, Maxima returns in the film Kamen Rider Ex-Aid the Movie: True Ending to assist his employee Kagenari Nagumo. In the process, Maxima infects himself with the Gamedeus virus and absorbs three Gashatrophies that Madoka Hoshi created to transform into Gamedeus Machina (ゲムデウスマキナ, Gemudeusu Makina), only to be defeated by Kamen Rider Ex-Aid.

As Gamedeus Machina, he can utilize the Bugster's abilities and wields the Machina Slasher (マキナスラッシャー, Makina Surasshā) sword and the Machina Rampart (マキナランパート, Makina Ranpāto) shield. Additionally, he can transform into the gigantic Super Gamedeus Machina (超ゲムデウスマキナ, Chō Gemudeusu Makina), a form that possesses the extendable Machina Fafnir (マキナファーブニル, Makina Fābuniru) arms and the sword-like Machinacalibur (マキナカリバー, Makinakaribā) leg.

Johnny Maxima is portrayed by Brother Tom (ブラザー・トム, Burazā Tomu).

=== Madoka Hoshi ===
Madoka Hoshi (星 まどか, Hoshi Madoka) is a 7-year-old girl who requires daily treatments for her brain tumor, was transferred to the Seito University Hospital's care, and appears exclusively in the film Kamen Rider Ex-Aid the Movie: True Ending. Her father, Kagenari Nagumo, intends to save her by infecting her with the Gamedeus virus in order to transfer her consciousness to a virtual reality world in cyberspace. Despite Kamen Rider Ex-Aid's attempts to save her, she chooses to stay in the VR world with her father.

Madoka Hoshi is portrayed by Noel Moriyama (森山 のえる, Moriyama Noeru).

=== Akemi Hoshi ===
Akemi Hoshi (星 朱美, Hoshi Akemi) is Madoka's mother and Kagenari Nagumo's ex-wife who raised the former on her own.

Akemi Hoshi is portrayed by Miki Fujimoto (藤本 美貴, Fujimoto Miki).

=== Nebula Bugsters ===
The Nebula Bugsters (ネビュラバグスター, Nebyura Bagusutā) are Bugster/Smash hybrids that Kaisei Mogami created using Bugster Virus and liquid Nebula Gas samples.

=== Luke Kidman ===
Luke Kidman (ルーク＝キッドマン, Rūku Kiddoman) is an American esports professional who appears exclusively in the V-Cinema Kamen Rider Ex-Aid Trilogy: Another Ending. He sees Nico as a rival despite being a fan of her.

Luke Kidman is portrayed by Harry Sugiyama (ハリー 杉山, Harī Sugiyama).

=== Black Parado ===
Black Parado (ブラックパラド, Burakku Parado), also known as Another Parado (アナザーパラド, Anazā Parado), is an alternate version of Parado that Kuroto created after using his revived father, Masamune, as a host incubator who appears exclusively in the V-Cinema Kamen Rider Ex-Aid Trilogy: Another Ending. Upon Black Parado's creation, Kuroto has Saiko Yaotome reprogram the former to support him in acquiring human DNA and stopping CR from reviving Bugster Virus victims by replacing the original Parado. After fighting the original Parado, Black Parado is absorbed by Kuroto, who uses him to create the God Maximum Mighty X Gashat.

Utilizing the double-sized Gashat Gear Dual Another (ガシャットギアデュアルアナザー, Gashatto Gia Dyuaru Anazā) in conjunction with the Gamer Driver, Black Parado can transform into Kamen Rider Another Para-DX (仮面ライダーアナザーパラドクス, Kamen Raidā Anazā Paradokusu).

Like the original Parado, Black Parado is portrayed by Shouma Kai.

=== Saiko Yaotome ===
Saiko Yaotome (八乙女 紗衣子, Yaotome Saiko) is a researcher of the Seito University Hospital's Regenerative Medicine Center, an authority on gene therapy, and the daughter of Michihiko Zaizen who researches methods for reviving Bugster Virus victims and appears exclusively in the V-Cinema Kamen Rider Ex-Aid Trilogy: Another Ending. Using the Bugvisor G (バグヴァイザーG, Baguvaizā Jī) belt and its built-in Bugster o Tsukuru ze! (バグスターを作るぜ!, Bagusutā o Tskuru ze!; I Will Make Bugster!) game, she intends to continue her father's work and avenge his death by working with Kuroto to kill Bugsters in order to revive Bugster Virus victims. Upon learning Kuroto had used her however, she experiences remorse and helps the Gamer Riders develop a cure for Kuroto's victims during his attempt to destroy the universe and contribute to restoring Kiriya's humanity.

Saiko Yaotome is portrayed by Yurina Yanagi (柳 ゆり菜, Yanagi Yurina).

=== Kiyonaga Hojo ===
Kiyonaga Hojo (宝生 清長, Hōjō Kiyonaga) is Emu's father, the former president of a medical equipment manufacturing company, and the accidental creator of the Bugster Virus who appears exclusively in the tie-in novel Novel: Kamen Rider Ex-Aid: Mighty Novel X. Kiyonaga attempted to counteract the Bugster Virus before the Year 2000 problem, but Masamune discovered his secrets and blackmailed him into turning Emu into a carrier for the virus. As a result, a guilt-ridden Kiyonaga severed all ties with his family. Following the events of Kamen Rider Ex-Aid Trilogy: Another Ending, Kiyonaga resurfaces as Kamen Rider Gemn to face and apologize to Emu as part of Kuroto's Mighty Novel X game before Kuroto kills him.
