= Kamen Rider Heisei Generations Final: Build & Ex-Aid with Legend Rider =

Kamen Rider Heisei Generations FINAL: Build & Ex-Aid with Legend Riders
- Theatrical poster

Japanese name
- Kanji: 仮面ライダー平成ジェネレーションズ FINAL ビルド&エグゼイドwithレジェンドライダー
Transcriptions
- Revised Hepburn: Kamen Raidā Heisei Jenerēshonzu Fainaru Birudo Ando Eguzeido Wizu Rejendo Raidā
- Directed by: Kazuya Kamihoriuchi
- Written by: Shogo Muto; Yuya Takahashi
- Based on: Kamen Rider Build by Shogo Muto Kamen Rider Ex-Aid by Yuya Takahashi
- Starring: Atsuhiro Inukai; Hiroki Iijima; Shu Watanabe; Sota Fukushi; Gaku Sano; Shun Nishime; Eiji Akaso; Kaho Takada; Toshiki Seto; Ukyo Matsumoto; Tetsuya Iwanaga; Ruka Matsuda; Hayato Onozuka; Shouma Kai; Ryosuke Miura; Kensei Mikami; Yasuyuki Maekawa; Kenji Ohtsuki
- Cinematography: Kōji Kurata
- Edited by: Ren Satō
- Music by: Kenji Kawai; ats-; Takehito Shimizu; Toru Watanabe; Kōtarō Nakagawa
- Production companies: Ishinomori Productions; Toei TV Production Co., Ltd.
- Distributed by: Toei Company
- Release date: December 9, 2017
- Running time: 91 minutes
- Country: Japan
- Language: Japanese
- Box office: $10.2 million

Kamen Rider Heisei Generations Final: Build & Ex-Aid with Legend Riders (仮面ライダー平成ジェネレーションズ FINAL ビルド&エグゼイドwithレジェンドライダー, Kamen Raidā Heisei Jenerēshonzu Fainaru Birudo Ando Eguzeido Wizu Rejendo Raidā) is a 2017 Japanese film in the Movie War line of the Kamen Rider Series. It serves as a crossover between the television series Kamen Rider Build and Kamen Rider Ex-Aid. The film features the series' two lead heroes and their allies, with assistance from Kamen Rider OOO, Kamen Rider Fourze, Kamen Rider Gaim and Kamen Rider Ghost.

== Plot ==
Waking up from a strange dream where he extracted Kamen Rider Ex-Aid's power, Sento and Ryūga are alerted to a Smash attack and find themselves instead encountering Bugsters immune to their attacks until Sento uses the newly created Doctor and Game Fullbottles to transform into Ex-Aid. But a blue-armored figure called Kaiser appears and steals the bottles which Sento retrieves while Ryūga is thrown into a machine that sends him to a parallel world where the Skywall does not exist. Suddenly, Sento's world shifts between dimensions and appears next to the other world, spreading hordes of Bugsters in both. With Emu unable to transform into Ex-Aid, his fellow Riders take the initiative against the Bugsters before they are confronted by the red-armored Kaiser Reverse, revealing that the Bugsters epidemic is fuel for his machine Enigma as it and its counterpart in Sento's world seals the powers of the Gamer Drivers and Gashats. Kaiser Reverse then attempts to kill Emu's group when he is driven off by Kamen Rider Ghost, who reveals their world will be destroyed in 24 hours.

Meanwhile, Sento is attacked by Parado, who affirms that he spent the last two years looking for Build in his world to get back Ex-Aid's essence. Their fight is stopped by Sōichi, who reveals that the culprit must be Kaisei Mogami, a researcher who once published a paper about the development of a trans-dimensional machine called Enigma. Parado uses Game Fullbottle to contact Emu and inform him about the situation while Sōichi gives the Phoenix and Robot Fullbottles to Sento. Kuroto, having developed a new Gashat with data from his previous fight against Build to briefly regain his powers, is convinced by Onari to create more for the other Doctor Riders, while Sento and Sawa discover that Mogami once worked under Takumi Katsuragi on Enigma while also developing the Kaiser System and synthesizing the Nebula Bugsters by exposing the Bugster Virus to Nebula Gas. Sento while concludes that Takumi was the one who extracted Ex-Aid's essence, but its perplexed over how the event appeared in his dreams.

As Sento and Parado fight the Nebula Bugsters to protect the population, Kaiser attempts to stop them before being driven away by Build PhoenixRobo Form. The two then track down his hideout with Misora's help and Sento concludes that Takumi stole Ex-Aid's powers to prevent them from being sealed as well, as a countermeasure against Enigma. With the new Kamen Rider Build Gashat created by Kuroto, Taiga, Hiiro and Kiriya join Takeru against the Nebula Bugsters, while a cliff suddenly opens and Ryūga is about to fall on it, when Eiji Hino appears and assists Emu in rescuing him. Eiji then reveals that Foundation X is working with their reality's Kaisei Mogami to develop their side's Enigma and the three set out to confront him at his base, while Sento confronts his world's Mogami who is rendered a cyborg after Takumi's attempt to stop him. Mogami is then joined by his dimensional counterpart, the two revealing their intention to cause a convergence between the worlds while merging into a single god-like being: Bi-Kaiser. Bi-Kaizer uses Core Medals developed by Foundation X to create replica Greed to hold off the Kamen Riders, Eiji using an Ankh clone to revive the original and regain his ability to fight as Kamen Rider OOO while Kamen Riders Fourze and Gaim help Sento and Emu reach the Enigma machines on their respective worlds. Sento concludes that the best way to solve the situation is by prematurely activating the Enigmas with Bi-Kaiser left at only a fraction of his power, restoring Emu's powers while their allies face Bi-Kaiser's forces. Build and Ex-Aid confront and destroy Bi-Kaiser along with the Enigma machines, stopping the convergence and parting ways once the dimensional barrier is restored. After the battle, Onari is welcomed back in the Daitenkū-ji temple while Ankh's vessel fades away with Eiji promising that they will meet again.

In the post credits, Sento and Ryūga confront several Guardians from Faust when a mysterious Rider appears and steals the Phoenix and Robot Fullbottles from Sento, as he flees, he claims that the Bottles belonged to Hokuto in the first place, and affirms that he will soon return.

== Cast ==
Build cast

- Sento Kiryū (桐生 戦兎, Kiryū Sento): Atsuhiro Inukai (犬飼 貴丈, Inukai Atsuhiro)
- Ryūga Banjō (万丈 龍我, Banjō Ryūga): Eiji Akaso (赤楚 衛二, Akaso Eiji)
- Misora Isurugi (石動 美空, Isurugi Misora): Kaho Takada (高田 夏帆, Takada Kaho)
- Sawa Takigawa (滝川 紗羽, Takigawa Sawa): Yukari Taki (滝 裕可里, Taki Yukari)
- Takumi Katsuragi (葛城 巧, Katsuragi Takumi): Yukiaki Kiyama (木山 廉彬, Kiyama Yukiaki)
- Gentoku Himuro (氷室 幻徳, Himuro Gentoku): Kensei Mikami (水上 剣星, Mikami Kensei)
- Sōichi Isurugi (石動 惣一, Isurugi Sōichi): Yasuyuki Maekawa (前川 泰之, Maekawa Yasuyuki)

Ex-Aid cast

- Emu Hojo (宝生 永夢, Hōjō Emu): Hiroki Iijima (飯島 寛騎, Iijima Hiroki)
- Hiiro Kagami (鏡 飛彩, Kagami Hiiro): Toshiki Seto (瀬戸 利樹, Seto Toshiki)
- Taiga Hanaya (花家 大我, Hanaya Taiga): Ukyo Matsumoto (松本 享恭, Matsumoto Ukyō)
- Kuroto Dan (檀 黎斗, Dan Kuroto): Tetsuya Iwanaga (岩永 徹也, Iwanaga Tetsuya)
- Asuna Karino (仮野 明日那, Karino Asuna): Ruka Matsuda (松田 るか, Matsuda Ruka)
- Kiriya Kujo (九条 貴利矢, Kujō Kiriya): Hayato Onozuka (小野塚 勇人, Onozuka Hayato)
- Nico Saiba (西馬 ニコ, Saiba Niko): Reina Kurosaki (黒崎 レイナ, Kurosaki Reina)
- Parado (パラド): Shouma Kai (甲斐 翔真, Kai Shōma)

Returning cast

- Eiji Hino (火野 映司, Hino Eiji): Shu Watanabe (渡部 秀, Watanabe Shū)
- Ankh (アンク, Anku): Ryosuke Miura (三浦 涼介, Miura Ryōsuke)
- Gentaro Kisaragi (如月 弦太朗, Kisaragi Gentarō): Sota Fukushi (福士 蒼汰, Fukushi Sōta)
- JK (ジェイク, Jeiku): Shion Tsuchiya (土屋 シオン, Tsuchiya Shion)
- Chuta Ohsugi (大杉 忠太, Ōsugi Chūta): Takushi Tanaka (田中 卓志, Tanaka Takushi; of Ungirls)
- Kota Kazuraba (葛葉 紘汰, Kazuraba Kōta): Gaku Sano (佐野 岳, Sano Gaku)
- Takeru Tenkūji (天空寺 タケル, Tenkūji Takeru): Shun Nishime (西銘 駿, Nishime Shun)
- Onari (御成): Takayuki Yanagi (柳 喬之, Takayuki Yanagi)

Heisei Generations Final cast

- Kaisei Mogami (最上 魁星, Mogami Kaisei): Kenji Ohtsuki (大槻 ケンヂ, Ōtsuki Kenji)

=== Voiceover roles ===
- Kamen Rider Grease (仮面ライダーグリス, Kamen Raidā Gurisu): Kouhei Takeda (武田 航平, Takeda Kōhei)
- Hoodie Ghosts (パーカーゴースト, Pākā Gōsuto): Tomokazu Seki (関 智一, Seki Tomokazu)
- Build Driver and Nebula Steam Gun Voices: Katsuya Kobayashi (小林 克也, Kobayashi Katsuya)
- Rider Gashat Voice: Hironobu Kageyama (影山 ヒロノブ, Kageyama Hironobu)
- Ghost Driver Equipment and Eyecon Driver G Voices: m.c.A.T
- Sengoku Driver Equipment Voice: Seiji Hiratoko (平床 政治, Hiratoko Seiji)
- O-Scanner Voice: Akira Kushida (串田 アキラ, Kushida Akira)

== Production ==
The script was co-written by Shogo Muto and Yuya Takahashi, the head writers for Kamen Rider Build and Kamen Rider Ex-Aid respectively.

=== Theme song ===
- "Kamen Rider Heisei Generations Final Special Medley" (仮面ライダー平成ジェネレーションズFINAL スペシャル・メドレー, Kamen Raidā Heisei Jenerēshonzu Fainaru Supesharu Medorē)

A medley of the opening theme songs from Kamen Rider Build, Kamen Rider Ex-Aid, Kamen Rider Ghost, Kamen Rider Fourze, Kamen Rider Gaim and Kamen Rider OOO.

== Release ==
The film was released nationally in Japan on December 9, 2017.

A tie-in web series called Legend rider in 3 minutes (3分でわかるレジェンドライダー, San-bu de Wakaru Rejendo Raidā) was released on Toei's official Youtube channel where the characters Kiryu Sento and Ryuga Banjou introduces the audience to the returning characters from past series that appeared in this film.

The movie was released on DVD and blu-ray on May 9, 2018.

== Reception ==
Kamen Rider Heisei Generations Final: Build & Ex-Aid with Legend Rider earned $10.2 million at the Japanese box office.
