= Tetsuya Iwanaga =

Tetsuya Iwanaga may refer to:

- Tetsuya Iwanaga (model) (born 1986), Japanese fashion model
- Tetsuya Iwanaga (voice actor) (born 1970), Japanese voice actor
