= Hiroki Iijima =

Japanese actor and model

- 飯島 寛騎
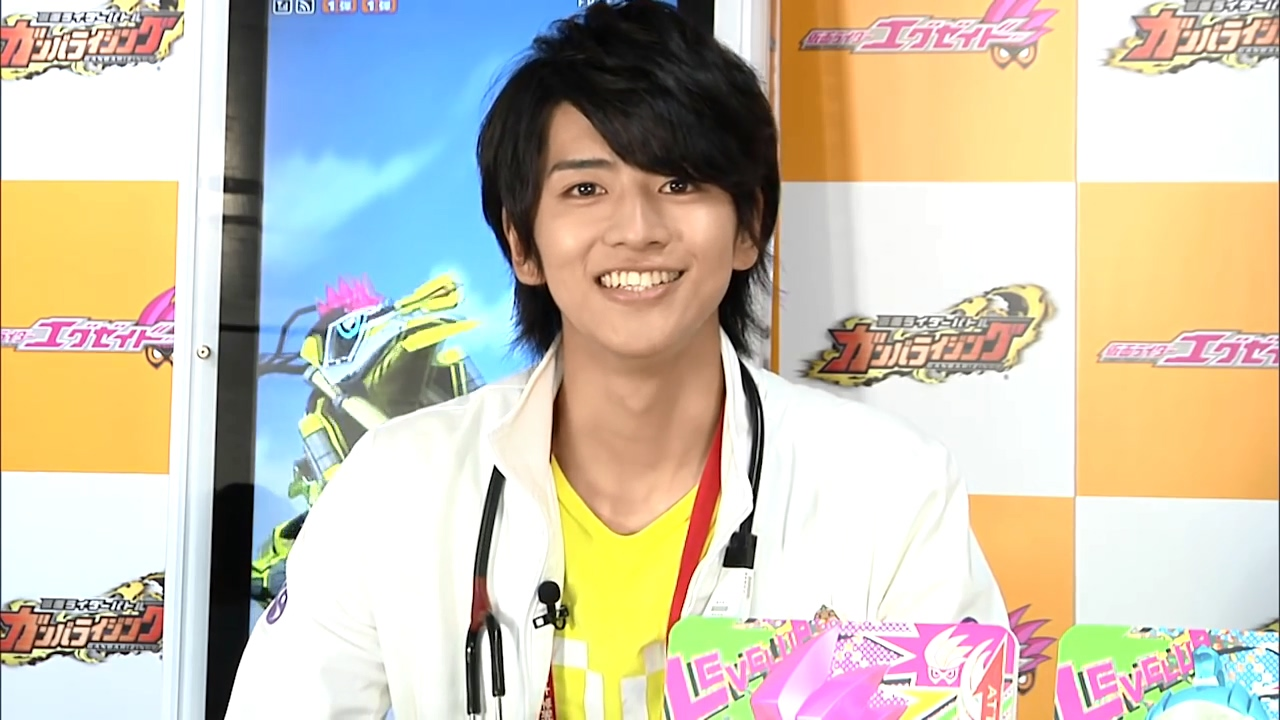
- Iijima in 2016 in a promotional video for Kamen Rider Ex-Aid
- Born: August 16, 1996 (age 30); Asahikawa, Hokkaido, Japan
- Education: Sapporo Shiroishi High School; Ōtani University
- Occupation: Actor
- Years active: 2015–present
- Agent: Oscar Promotion
- Awards: 28th Junon Super Boy Contest Grand Prix
- Website: Official profile

Hiroki Iijima (飯島 寛騎, Ījima Hiroki; born 16 August 1996, in Hokkaido, Japan) is a Japanese actor.

Iijima is represented by Oscar Promotion.

== Biography ==
• Iijima graduated from Sapporo Shiroshi Elementary School. He played basketball, and once part of a volleyball circle at Osaka High School . While working on a part-time job at an apparel store on 2015, Iijima won the Grand Prix at the 28th Junon Super Boy Contest and he is currently attending Ōtani University.

• It was announced in August 2016 that he would play the lead role in the TV Asahi series Kamen Rider Ex-Aid as Hojo Emu that began airing of October of that year.

• In August 2020, it was announced that Iijima had tested positive for COVID-19.

• Ijiima played as Minoru Ueda in Famous Japanese boys love, Our Dining Table.

== Filmography ==
=== TV series ===
| Year | Title | Role | Notes | Ref. |
|---|---|---|---|---|
| 2016 | Kamen Rider Ghost | Emu Hōjō/Kamen Rider Ex-Aid (voice) | Episode 50 | |
| 2016–17 | Kamen Rider Ex-Aid | Emu Hōjō/Kamen Rider Ex-Aid | Lead role | |
| 2017 | Uchu Sentai Kyuranger | Emu Hōjō/Kamen Rider Ex-Aid | Episode 7 | |
| 2017 | Kamen Sentai Gorider | Emu Hōjō/Kamen Rider Ex-Aid | Web mini-series | |
| 2018 | Holiday Love | Shun Koizumi | | |
| 2018 | Kamen Rider Zi-O | Emu Hōjō/Kamen Rider Ex-Aid | Episode 3-4 | |
| 2023 | Our Dining Table | Minoru Ueda | Lead role | |

=== Films ===
| Year | Title | Role | Notes | Ref. |
|---|---|---|---|---|
| 2016 | Kamen Rider Ghost: The 100 Eyecons and Ghost's Fated Moment | Emu Hōjō/Kamen Rider Ex-Aid (voice) | Cameo | |
| 2016 | Kamen Rider Heisei Generations: Dr. Pac-Man vs. Ex-Aid & Ghost with Legend Rider | Emu Hōjō/Kamen Rider Ex-Aid | Lead role | |
| 2017 | Kamen Rider × Super Sentai: Ultra Super Hero Taisen | Emu Hōjō/Kamen Rider Ex-Aid | Lead role | |
| 2017 | Kamen Rider Ex-Aid the Movie: True Ending | Emu Hōjō/Kamen Rider Ex-Aid | Lead role | |
| 2017 | Kamen Rider Heisei Generations Final: Build & Ex-Aid with Legend Rider | Emu Hōjō/Kamen Rider Ex-Aid | Lead role | |
| 2021 | Brave: Gunjō Senki | Yūta Naruse | | |
| 2021 | The Bonds of Clay | Takeshi Murakami | | |
| 2023 | Dependence | | | |
| 2025 | Aosho! Voices in Bloom | Arata Negishi | | |
