= Atsuhiro Inukai =

Japanese actor (born 1994)

- 犬飼 貴丈
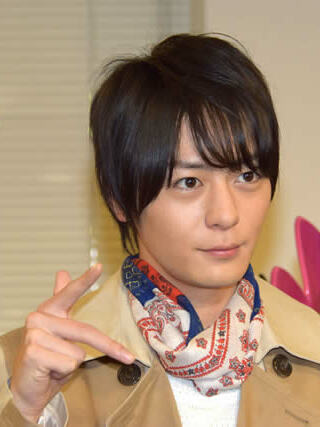
- Inukai promoting Kamen Rider Build in 2017
- Born: June 13, 1994 (age 32); Tokushima Prefecture, Japan
- Occupation: Actor
- Years active: 2012–present
- Agent: Burning Production
- Television: Ao no Umi: Long Summer; Kamen Rider Build
- Awards: 25th Junon Super Boy Contest Grand Prix
- Website: Atsuhiko Inukai official site

Atsuhiro Inukai (犬飼 貴丈, Inukai Atsuhiro; born June 13, 1994) is a Japanese actor. He is represented with Burning Production.

== Biography ==
In the 25th Junon Super Boy Contest in 2012, he won the Grand Prix from among 13,816 total applicants.

He made his acting debut in 2014, in the daytime band drama Ao no Umi: Long Summer.

In 2017, he starred in his first main character role in a television drama Kamen Rider Build., which is also the second time he would work alongside fellow actor Kouhei Takeda, whom appeared alongside him in TBS drama Hotel Concierge.

== Personal life ==
His hobbies are listening to music and watching DVDs.

His special skills are 110 meters hurdle and playing the guitar. In hurdling, he won 6th place in the prefecture in a newcomer match.

For the audition to play the main character in "Kamen Rider Build", he obtained a motorcycle license but producers prevented him from riding one during filming over safety concerns. He also has experience in shoot boxing, and in Kamen Rider Build he incorporates these fighting pose elements into his transformation poses.

He graduated from Tokushima Prefectural Tomioka Nishi High School.

== Filmography ==
=== TV dramas ===
Year	Title	Role	Notes	Ref.
2014	Ao no Umi: Long Summer	Kota Aragaki (aged 17)		
2016	Our House	Junichi Kagami		
2017	Kamen Rider Ex-Aid	Kamen Rider Build (voice)	Episode 44, cameo	
2017	Kamen Rider Build	Sento Kiryu/Kamen Rider Build	Lead role	
2018	Kamen Rider Zi-O	Sento Kiryu/Kamen Rider Build	Episode 1-2	
2019	Natsuzora: Natsu's Sky	Yōhei Yamada	Asadora	
2020	24 Japan	Tsuyoshi Samejima		
2021	Reach Beyond the Blue Sky	Fukuchi Gen'ichirō	Taiga drama	
2021-2025	A Man Who Defies the World of BL	Protagonist/Mob	Lead role	
2022	Fishbowl Wives	Sota		
2022	New Nobunaga Chronicle: High School Is a Battlefield	Kenshin Uesugi		
2023	Our Dining Table	Yutaka Hozumi	Lead role	
2025	Omusubi	Satoshi Sugisawa	Asadora	

=== Film ===
Year	Title	Role	Notes	Ref.
2017	Kamen Rider Ex-Aid the Movie: True Ending	Kamen Rider Build (voice)	Cameo	
2017	Kamen Rider Heisei Generations Final	Sento Kiryu/Kamen Rider Build	Lead role	
2018	Kamen Rider Build the Movie: Be the One	Sento Kiryu/Kamen Rider Build	Lead role	
2018	Kamen Rider Heisei Generations Forever	Sento Kiryu/Kamen Rider Build	Lead role	
2019	Kamen Rider Build New World: Kamen Rider Cross-Z	Sento Kiryu/Kamen Rider Build		
2019	Kamen Rider Build New World: Kamen Rider Grease	Sento Kiryu/Kamen Rider Build		
2021	No Call No Life	Kousuke Sakura		
2023	Once Upon a Crime	Staircase guard		
2025	Black Showman	Kaito Sugishita		
2025	Romantic Killer			
