= Bull Doctor =

- Genre: Drama
- Written by: Atsuko Hashibe
- Directed by: Mitsuru Kubota; Makoto Naganuma; Miyuki Honma
- Starring: Makiko Esumi; Satomi Ishihara; Goro Inagaki; Mirai Shida
- Ending theme: Far as the Sky by Charice Pempengco
- Country of origin: Japan
- Original language: Japanese
- No. of seasons: 1
- No. of episodes: 11

Production
- Producers: Kazuya Toda; Masahiro Kunimoto; Eiji Ōtsuka; Yoshiki Tanaka
- Running time: 54 minutes

Original release
- Network: NTV
- Release: 6 July – 14 September 2011

Bull Doctor (ブルドクター, Buru Dokutā) is a Japanese television drama series that aired on NTV from 6 July to 14 September 2011.

== Cast ==
- Makiko Esumi as Tamami Ōdate
- Goro Inagaki as Junnosuke Nakura
- Fumiyo Kohinata as Nobuo Takeda
- Sakura as Ayame Matsuoka
- Bro.TOM as Kōhei Narumi
- Magy as Kengo Yashiro
- Mirai Shida as Mia Takeda
- Takurō Ōno as Shunsuke Fujimura
- Satomi Ishihara as Chika Kamatsuda
- Narushi Ikeda as Kōji Izumi
- Kenji Anan as Yoshihiko Kamioka

Preceded by Rebound (27/04/2011 - 29/06/2011)	Nippon TV Wednesday Dramas; Wednesdays 22:00 - 22:54 (JST)	Succeeded by Kaseifu no Mita (12/10/2011 - 21/12/2011)
