= Our Dining Table =

Japanese manga series by Ori Mita

- Cover of the Japanese version, released on January 24, 2017

僕らの食卓 (Bokura no Shokutaku)
- Genre: Cooking, drama, boys' love
- Manga
- Written by: Ori Mita
- Published by: Gentosha
- English publisher: NA: Seven Seas Entertainment
- Imprint: Birz Comics Rutile Collection
- Magazine: Rutile
- Original run: November 21, 2015 – January 21, 2017
- Volumes: 1
- Television drama
- Directed by: Yuho Ishibashi; Kashō Iizuka; Naho Kamimura
- Written by: Yuho Ishibashi; Kashō Iizuka; Naho Kamimura; Ayumi Shimo
- Studio: The Room
- Licensed by: GagaOOLala
- Original network: BS-TBS
- Original run: April 6, 2023 – June 15, 2023
- Episodes: 11
- icon

Our Dining Table (Japanese: 僕らの食卓, Hepburn: Bokura no Shokutaku) is a Japanese manga series by Ori Mita. It is serialized in the boys' love manga magazine Rutile from November 21, 2015, to January 21, 2017. A live-action television drama adaptation was broadcast from April 6, 2023, to June 15, 2023, on BS-TBS.

== Plot ==
Yutaka Hozumi is a lonely salaryman who is estranged from his family and finds it difficult to eat with other people. One day in the park, he meets brothers Minoru and Tane Ueda. Minoru and Tane find his cooking delicious and ask him to visit and teach them how to cook. Soon, Yutaka begins visiting and eating with the Ueda family. At the same time, Yutaka and Minoru's relationship begins to grow deeper as the two confront each other's past loneliness.

== Characters ==
Yutaka Hozumi (柳瀬 淳, Hozumi Yutaka)
Portrayed by: Atsuhiro Inukai
Yutaka is a salaryman. He was adopted into a family as a young child, and because his stepsiblings would tell him they were disgusted to eat with him, eventually, he found it difficult to eat with other people.
Minoru Ueda (上田 穰, Ueda Minoru)
Portrayed by: Hiroki Iijima
Minoru is a freeter who is Yutaka's age. He often acts as Tane's caretaker.
Tane Ueda (上田 種, Ueda Tane)
Portrayed by: Kūga Maeyama
Tane is Minoru's 4-year-old younger brother.

== Media ==
=== Manga ===
Our Dining Table is written and illustrated by Ori Mita. It is serialized in the boys' love manga magazine Rutile from the January 2016 issue released on November 21, 2015, to the March 2017 issue released on January 21, 2017. The chapters were later released in one bound volume by Gentosha under the Birz Comics Rutile Collection imprint.

On May 23, 2019, Seven Seas Entertainment announced that they had licensed the series for English-language distribution in North America.

No.	Original release date	Original ISBN	English release date	English ISBN
1	January 24, 2017	978-4-04-065846-9	December 17, 2019	978-1642757569

=== Television drama ===
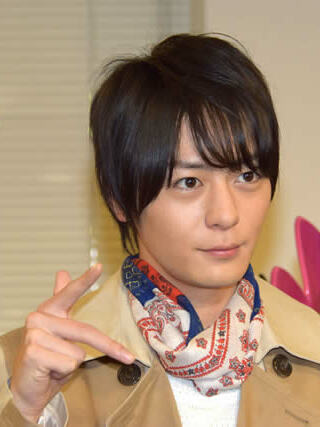
Atsuhiro Inukai (pictured in 2017) starred in the live-action drama adaptation as Yutaka Hozumi.

On November 23, 2021, a live-action television drama series adaptation was announced through Rutile's Twitter account. The series was broadcast from April 6, 2023, to June 15, 2023, on BS-TBS. During BS-TBS's press conference on March 8, 2023, the company highlighted Our Dining Table as one of the serial dramas meant to target the adult demographic, following the channel's Q2 programming's theme of "Let's enjoy being adults." In addition to BS-TBS, the series was also streamed digitally on Lemino beginning on April 12, 2023. It was streamed internationally with English subtitles on GagaOOLala.

The adaptation starred Atsuhiro Inukai as Yutaka, Hiroki Iijima as Minoru, and Kūga Maeyama as Tane. The supporting cast includes Ryuji Harada as Kōji Ueda, Minoru and Tane's father; Seika Furuhata as Rei Ohata, Yutaka's co-worker; and Tomohiro Ichikawa as Yuki Hozumi, Yutaka's older stepbrother. Additional cast members include Tetsuji from the comedy duo Shampoo Hat as Gotō, the owner of the ramen shop where Minoru works; Shiori Tamada as Nao, Minoru's ex-girlfriend, and Yo Hasegawa as Mika Ueda, Minoru and Tane's mother. The series is produced by The Room. It is directed by Yuho Ishibashi, Kashō Iizuka, and Naho Kamimura. The three, along with Ayumi Shimo, were also in charge of the script. Filming took place in Mima in Tokushima Prefecture, which is also Inukai's hometown. The opening theme song is "Andante no Sunadokei" by Beverly, and the ending theme song is "Tooi Kuni" by Daiki Ueno.

No.	Title	Directed by	Written by	Original release date
1	"Episode 1"; Transliteration: "Dai-ichi-wa" (Japanese: 第1話)	Yuho Ishibashi	Ayumi Shimo	April 6, 2023
2	"Episode 2"; Transliteration: "Dai-ni-wa" (Japanese: 第2話)	Kashō Iizuka	Ayumi Shimo	April 13, 2023
3	"Episode 3"; Transliteration: "Dai-san-wa" (Japanese: 第3話)	Naho Kamimura	Naho Kamimura	April 20, 2023
4	"Episode 4"; Transliteration: "Dai-yon-wa" (Japanese: 第4話)	Yuho Ishibashi	Yuho Ishibashi	April 27, 2023
5	"Episode 5"; Transliteration: "Dai-go-wa" (Japanese: 第5話)	Kashō Iizuka	Kashō Iizuka	May 4, 2023
6	"Episode 6"; Transliteration: "Dai-roku-wa" (Japanese: 第6話)	Naho Kamimura	Naho Kamimura	May 11, 2023
7	"Episode 7"; Transliteration: "Dai-nana-wa" (Japanese: 第7話)	Yuho Ishibashi	Yuho Ishibashi	May 18, 2023
8	"Episode 8"; Transliteration: "Dai-hachi-wa" (Japanese: 第8話)	Kashō Iizuka	Kashō Iizuka	May 25, 2023
9	"Episode 9"; Transliteration: "Dai-kyū-wa" (Japanese: 第9話)	Yuho Ishibashi	Ayumi Shimo	June 1, 2023
10	"Episode 10"; Transliteration: "Dai-jū-wa" (Japanese: 第10話)	Yuho Ishibashi	Ayumi Shimo	June 8, 2023
11	"Episode 11"; Transliteration: "Dai-jūichi-wa" (Japanese: 第11話)	Naho Kamimura	Naho Kamimura	June 15, 2023

== Reception ==
Our Dining Table came in 3rd place for Best Comic at the 9th BL Awards in 2018. Anime News Network reviewed Our Dining Table favorably, calling the series "charming."

For the television drama adaptation, The Television called the series "heart-warming."
