= Reina Kurosaki =

Japanese actress (born 1998)

- 黒崎 レイナ
- Born: 11 November 1998 (age 27); Aichi Prefecture, Japan
- Occupations: Actress; model
- Years active: 2011–present
- Agents: Lucolort (present) Hori Agency; Ken-On
- Height: 161 cm (5 ft 3 in)
- Website: Official profile

Reina Kurosaki (黒崎 レイナ, Kurosaki Reina; born 11 November 1998, in Aichi Prefecture) is a Japanese actress, tarento and fashion model who is represented by Lucolort.

== Biography ==
- In April 2011, Kurosaki made her debut in the drama Hagane no Onna season 2.
- Kurosaki worked as an exclusive model for the fashion magazine Nicola from December 2011 (the January 2012 issue) to April 2015 (the May 2015 issue). She only appeared in the cover once. She later worked as an exclusive model for the fashion magazine Seventeen from August 2015 (the September 2015 issue) to March 2018 (the May 2018 issue).
- Kurosaki's hobbies are drawing manga and singing songs. Her special skill is drawing illustrations.
- Kurosaki's favourite film is Iron Man and her favourite novel is Baccano!

== Filmography ==
=== TV dramas ===
Year	Title	Role	Network	Ep.
2011	Hagane no Onna season 2	Tao Vincent	TV Asahi	1 and 5
2011	Bull Doctor	Yuka Taguchi	NTV	1
2011	Doctors: Saikyō no Meii	Hiroko Miyoshi	TV Asahi	1
2013	Kasukana Kanojo	Ayano Honma	KTV	1
2013	35-sai no Koukousei	Ryo Akutsu's sister	NTV	Final
2015	Kurosaki-kun no Iinari ni Nante Naranai	Aya Nishino	NTV	
2016	Kamen Rider Ex-Aid	Nico Saiba	TV Asahi	
2018	Chūgakusei Nikki	Akira's ex-girlfriend	TBS	6
2019	A Story to Read When You First Fall in Love	Tajima Sakura		
2019	Watashi, Teiji de Kaerimasu	Asako	TBS	8
2019	Sign: Houigakusha Yuzuki Takashi no Jiken	Nakazono Yu	TV Asahi	2, 6-9
2024	Sora Wataru Kyoshitsu	Koshikawa Reina		2
2025	I, Kill	Aoba		
2025	Marry My Husband	Miku Suzuki	Prime	

=== Films ===
Year	Title	Role	Notes
2016	Kurosaki-kun no Iinari ni Nante Naranai	Aya Nishino	
2017	Kamen Rider Ex-Aid the Movie: True Ending	Nico Saiba	
2017	Kamen Rider Heisei Generations Final: Build & Ex-Aid with Legend Rider	Nico Saiba	
2018	The World's Longest Photograph	Erika Ando	

=== Advertisements ===
Year	Title
2016	Ajinomoto Cook Do Hoikōrō Nakunaru yo

=== Music videos ===
Year	Title
2014	Funky Kato "Kagayake"
2018	Sonar Pocket "Kimi no Namae"
2023	yukaDD "WRONG"

== Bibliography ==
=== Magazine serialisations ===
Year	Title	Notes
2011	Nicola	Exclusive model
2015	Seventeen	Exclusive model

== See also ==
- List of Japanese actresses
