= Kamen Rider Ex-Aid the Movie: True Ending =

- Kanji: 劇場版 仮面ライダーエグゼイド トゥルー・エンディング
- Revised Hepburn: Gekijōban Kamen Raidā Eguzeido Turū Endingu
- Directed by: Shojiro Nakazawa
- Written by: Yuya Takahashi
- Produced by: Takahito Ohmori; Ayumi Kanno; Taisuke Furuya
- Starring: Hiroki Iijima; Toshiki Seto; Ukyo Matsumoto; Tetsuya Iwanaga; Ruka Matsuda; Hayato Onozuka; Shouma Kai; Reina Kurosaki; Miki Fujimoto; Noel Moriyama; Shohei Uno; Brother Tom; Hanamaru Hakata; Yoshikuni Dōchin
- Cinematography: Kōji Kurata
- Edited by: Ren Satō
- Music by: Takehito Shimizu; Toru Watanabe
- Production companies: Toei Company; TV Asahi; Toei Video; Toei Agency; Bandai
- Distributed by: Toei Company
- Release date: August 5, 2017
- Running time: 61 minutes
- Country: Japan
- Language: Japanese
- Box office: $5,107,923

Kamen Rider Ex-Aid the Movie: True Ending (劇場版 仮面ライダーエグゼイド トゥルー・エンディング, Gekijōban Kamen Raidā Eguzeido Turū Endingu) is a 2017 Japanese superhero film, serving as the film adaptation of the 2016-2017 Kamen Rider Series television series Kamen Rider Ex-Aid, serving as the show's "true ending" to conclude its final story arc, and featuring the debut of the protagonist of Kamen Rider Build. It was released in Japan on August 5, 2017, in a double billing with Uchu Sentai Kyuranger the Movie: Gase Indaver Strikes Back. The PlayStation VR Movie was released on July 13, 2017.

== Plot ==
The film is set a few days after the end of the TV Series. A new strain of the Bugster Virus spreads among the population and a group of Ninja Players led by Kamen Rider Fuma invades the Seito University Hospital. Emu, Poppy, Hiiro and Taiga transform into Kamen Riders to fight back, but are defeated, and everybody except for Emu is infected and put into a coma, with Fuma using his Gashacon Bugvisor on a child patient with a brain tumor called Madoka Hoshi and rendering her also unconscious before leaving. Once she awakes, Poppy is surprised to see her friends participating in a School Festival, as if nothing had happened. Meanwhile, Kiriya and Kuroto start to investigate the origin of this new virus and discover through Genm Corp's new president Tsukuru Koboshi that Masamune once negotiated with Johnny Maxima, the CEO of the game company Machina Vision regarding the contents of Kamen Rider Chronicle, but the deal was never completed, and both a Rider Gashat and Gamer Driver was stolen a few days later, along with part of the company's data.

Kiriya then confronts both Maxima and Fuma who is revealed as Kagenari Nagumo, Madoka's father. Kagenari then reveals that he sent Madoka and the others to the VR world for her sake, and does the same with Maxima and Kiriya. Kuroto then instructs Emu to enter the VR world to rescue them using a special VR system he developed and gives him a new Gashat called "Mighty Creator VRX". As Emu enters the game, Kuroto creates a distraction for Fuma with Parado's help. Once learning their plans, Kagenari chases after Emu to the VR world but is defeated by him. Emu then uses his new powers to create an exit for everybody to escape, but Madoka refuses to leave with them and stays alone in the VR world, until Maxima appears before her and uses the power she obtained for himself.

Back in the real world, the riders confront Kagenari about his actions and learn that his intention was to let Madoka live happily in the VR world as there was little chance for her to survive her treatment and even if she does, she would suffer from complications afterwards. Maxima then appears before them, revealing that he acquired trace data remains of Gamedeus and infects himself to transform into Gamedeus Machina so he can destroy the world. The riders are over powered by Maxima until Kuroto and Parado sacrifice themselves to restrain his powers with their own, forcing him to flee. Back at the CR, Emu and the others learn that Madoka's condition had worsened, and Hiiro, Emu and Asuna perform an emergency operation to save her. Meanwhile, Taiga and Kiriya decide to storm Machina Vision. Kagenari confronts them just to be defeated, and Maxima appears to attack them. Emu and Hiiro join the battle after the operation is completed and Emu reveals to Kagenari that he realized that Madoka's true wish was his own happiness. He also informs him that the operation was a success but she needs him by her side for her consciousness to return to the real world. As Kiriya leaves with Kagenari, Maxima ejects both Parado and Kuroto from his body to regain his full powers as Gamedeus and proceeds to destroy the world, until Emu transforms into Hyper Muteki to destroy him for good, while Kagenari, once reunited with his daughter, greets her as she wakes up.

With the incident solved, and the Bugster threat eradicated from Earth, the riders then return to their daily lives. In the post-credits, Emu and Parado confront a group of Bugsters when they are intercepted by Kamen Rider Build, who defeats Parado and extracts Ex-Aid's essence from Emu before leaving.

== Cast ==
- Emu Hojo (宝生 永夢, Hōjō Emu): Hiroki Iijima (飯島 寛騎, Iijima Hiroki)
- Hiiro Kagami (鏡 飛彩, Kagami Hiiro): Toshiki Seto (瀬戸 利樹, Seto Toshiki)
- Taiga Hanaya (花家 大我, Hanaya Taiga): Ukyo Matsumoto (松本 享恭, Matsumoto Ukyō)
- Kuroto Dan (檀 黎斗, Dan Kuroto): Tetsuya Iwanaga (岩永 徹也, Iwanaga Tetsuya)
- Asuna Karino (仮野 明日那, Karino Asuna): Ruka Matsuda (松田 るか, Matsuda Ruka)
- Kiriya Kujo (九条 貴利矢, Kujō Kiriya): Hayato Onozuka (小野塚 勇人, Onozuka Hayato)
- Parado (パラド): Shouma Kai (甲斐 翔真, Kai Shōma)
- Nico Saiba (西馬 ニコ, Saiba Niko): Reina Kurosaki (黒崎 レイナ, Kurosaki Reina)
- Akemi Hoshi (星 朱美, Hoshi Akemi): Miki Fujimoto (藤本 美貴, Fujimoto Miki)
- Madoka Hoshi (星 まどか, Hoshi Madoka): Noel Moriyama (森山 のえる, Moriyama Noeru)
- Tsukuru Koboshi (小星 作, Koboshi Tsukuru): Shohei Uno (宇野 祥平, Uno Shōhei)
- High school girl: Narumi Kuranoo (倉野尾 成美, Kuranoo Narumi; of AKB48)
- Ginko Yumita (弓田 吟子, Yumita Ginko): Chiaki Kawamoto (河本 千明, Kawamoto Chiaki)
- Nurse: Nanami Ishimaru (石丸 奈菜美, Ishimaru Nanami)
- Anesthesiologist: Tamio Satoh (佐藤 太三夫, Satō Tamio)
- Johnny Maxima (ジョニー・マキシマ, Jonī Makishima): Brother Tom (ブラザー・トム, Burazā Tomu)
- Haima Kagami (鏡 灰馬, Kagami Haima): Hanamaru Hakata (博多 華丸, Hakata Hanamaru)
- Kagenari Nagumo (南雲 影成, Nagumo Kagenari): Yoshikuni Dōchin (堂珍 嘉邦, Dōchin Yoshikuni)
- Kamen Rider Build (仮面ライダービルド, Kamen Raidā Birudo; Voice): Atsuhiro Inukai (犬飼 貴丈, Inukai Atsuhiro)
- Rider Gashat and Gashacon Weapon Voices: Hironobu Kageyama (影山 ヒロノブ, Kageyama Hironobu)
- Mighty Creator VRX Gashat and Gashacon Bugvisor II/Buggle Driver II Voices: Junichi Suwabe (諏訪部 順一, Suwabe Jun'ichi)
- Build Driver Voice: Katsuya Kobayashi (小林 克也, Kobayashi Katsuya)

== Theme song ==
- "Life is Beautiful"
  - Lyrics: Kanata Okajima
  - Composition: Daichi Miura, Kanata Okajima, UTA
  - Arrangement: UTA
  - Artist: Daichi Miura

== Reception ==
Kamen Rider Ex-Aid the Movie: True Ending grossed $5,107,923 at the box office.
