= Hayato Onozuka =

Japanese Actor

- 小野塚勇人
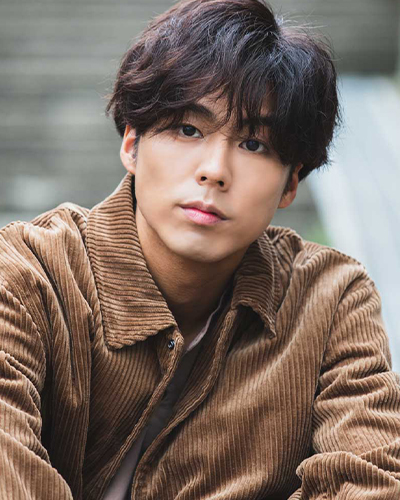
- Born: 29 June 1993 (age 32); Chiba Prefecture, Japan
- Occupations: Actor, dance
- Years active: 2010–present
- Agent: LDH
- Height: 174 cm (5 ft 9 in)

Hayato Onozuka (小野塚 勇人, Onozuka Hayato; born 29 June 1993, in Chiba Prefecture) is a Japanese actor. He is a member of Gekidan Exile.

Onozuka is represented with LDH.

== Biography ==
Onozuka entered Funabashi Senior High School by a football recommendation and was active in the football club, but he was aiming for a singer and transfer to a high school with the communication system.

He participated in the Vocal Battle Audition 2 in February 2010 but also failed in the second screening. Onozuka later participated in 3rd Gekidan Exile Audition which was held from August the same year, he became a finalist but lost.

In September 2012, he joined Gekidan Exile as a result of the performance of the stage play Attack No. 1.

== Filmography ==
=== Stage ===
Year	Title	Role	Notes	Ref.
2010	Gekidan Exile Hana-gumi×Kaze Kumiai Dō Kōen Rokudenashi Blues	Ikegami		
2011	Gekidan Exile W-Impact Red Cliff –Sen–			
2012	Hōnan-gumi×Gekidan Exile Attack No. 1	First Class Soldier Yokokawa		
2012	BS-TBS Harvest Festival Danshi Rakugo			
2012	BS-TBS Harvest Festival Otoko Nichibu			
2013	Sorao no Sekai			
2013	Wagahai wa Bōsandearu		Lead role	
2013	Gekidan Exile Kōen Attack No. 1	First Class Soldier Yokokawa		
2014	Yorozuya Kinnosuke Ichiza The Yorokin Ni Rei Ichi Shi-nen: Shinshun Hon Kōen: Hikeshi Aika –Fuyuzora no Kiyari-uta–			
2014	Gekidan Exile Attack No. 1 Spin-off Rōdoku Geki Mayuge Ichizoku no Inbō			
2014	Gripper Produce Kōen Amamitsutsuki no Neko		Lead role	
2014	Gekidan Exile Kōen The Mensetsu			
2014	Gekidan Exile Kōen Soreike Ko Gekijō!!			
2015	Gekidan Exile Kōen Tomorrow Never Dies –Yattekonai Ashita wa nai–			
2015	Bomber-Man / Shoka no Asakusa no Himitsu			

=== TV dramas ===
Year	Title	Role	Notes	Ref.
2016	Kamen Rider Ex-Aid	Kiriya Kujo/Kamen Rider Lazer (voice)/Kamen Rider Lazer Turbo (voice)	Episodes 1-12, 34-	
2022	Harem Marriage	Joe		
2025	Masked Ninja Akakage	Ikkan Oboro		

=== Films ===
Year	Title	Role	Notes	Ref.
2015	Hyō to Ura	Hata		
2015	Hyō to Ura: Dai 2-shō	Hata		
2015	Ushi Koku Ni San Ru	Kenji	Lead role	
2016	Road To High & Low	Kirinji		
2016	High & Low: The Movie	Kirinji		
2016	Kamen Rider Heisei Generations: Dr. Pac-Man vs. Ex-Aid & Ghost with Legend Riders	Kiriya Kujo/Kamen Rider Lazer (voice)		
2017	Kamen Rider × Super Sentai: Ultra Super Hero Taisen	Kiriya Kujo/Kamen Rider Lazer (voice)		
2017	Kamen Rider Ex-Aid the Movie: True Ending	Kiriya Kujo/Kamen Rider Lazer Turbo (voice)		
2018	Koi no Shizuku	Kanji Nogami		
2019	Gozen			
2019	Tokyo Wine Party People			
2023	Till We Meet Again on the Lily Hill			

=== Direct-to-video ===
Year	Title	Role	Publisher
2017	Kamen Sentai Gorider	Kiriya Kujo/Kamen Rider Lazer (voice)/Ki-Rider (voice)	au Video Pass
2017	Terevi-kun Hyper Battle DVD Kamen Rider Ex-Aid "Tricks" Kamen Rider Lazer	Kiriya Kujo/Kamen Rider Lazer (voice)	

=== Radio dramas ===
Year	Title	Role	Network	Reference
2016	Saturday Drama House "Binanshi Gekijō" Dai Jū Roku-dan Story Hajikeru Otoko	Takada-san, conductor, cinema employee, cinema guest	JFN	

=== Advertisements ===
Year	Product
2014	Mizuho Financial Group

=== Music videos ===
Year	Artist	Song
2010	Love	"Kataomoi"
