= Tetsuya Iwanaga (model) =

Japanese pharmacist and model

- 岩永 徹也
- Born: 16 October 1986 (age 39); Sasebo, Nagasaki, Japan
- Other names: Ōji; Shachō (社長); Kami (神)
- Education: Fukuoka University School of Pharmaceutical Sciences
- Occupations: Model; tarento; singer; actor
- Years active: 2009–present
- Style: Fashion
- Height: 186 cm (6 ft 1 in)

Tetsuya Iwanaga (岩永 徹也, Iwanaga Tetsuya; born 16 October 1986) is a Japanese pharmacist, male fashion model, tarento, and actor. He is a member of Japan Mensa. He is a member of Iwanaga Kyōdai.

== Biography ==
Iwanaga was born in Sasebo, Nagasaki. He graduated from Fukuoka University School of Pharmaceutical Sciences. Iwanaga also graduated from Keio University Graduate School of Pharmaceutical Sciences.

He worked as an exclusive model of the magazine Men's Non-no from July 2009, he also worked as a pharmacist since April 2012. Together with the same magazine models, Tomokane Osugi, and Hirokazu Akatsuka Iwanaga participated as a voice actor in the released film One Piece Film: Z in December 2012.

From February 2013 to July, he appeared in the Fuji TV series Terrace House under the nickname of Ōji (王子). After graduating from the same programme, Iwanaga appeared on the Yakyū-ken Corner of the broadcast Mecha-Mecha Iketeru! on 24 August the same year and became a topic on the internet. In November of the same year, he received membership of Japan Mensa, an organization of people with IQ with the world's top 2%. Broadcast on the same day of the same month Iwanaga appeared as a member of the "Ikemen Intelli Army" on Otameshika'! & Q-sama!! Gattai 2-jikan SP.

March 2014 After Men's Non-no exclusive model graduation (magazine publication up to the June issue) appears as a free model Baila, JJ, and other women's magazines. Iwanaga appeared in several advertisements including the Walkman F series. In addition, he participated in the writing of the medical part of Chapter 2 of "Science and Technology Explaining in English" written by Ichizo Ueda and Toshiko Ueda. His fields to be active are diverse.

Iwanaga's role of Kuroto Dan (檀 黎斗, Dan Kuroto) of Kamen Rider Ex-Aid broadcast in October 2016 is his first television drama appearance.

On March 31, 2022, Iwanaga left his talent agency, LesPros Entertainment.

== Personal life, favourites ==
- He has no full-fledged study abroad experience, he mastered self-taught English. Iwanaga speaks fluent English.
- Studying is his hobby. Iwanaga had acquired many licenses and qualifications.
- In the past, he was in charge of lyrics, music composition, vocals, guitar in an amateur band.
- Iwanaga loves space. He received a JAXA astronaut qualification test and received an all triple A rating.
- As long as Iwanaga uses the word "One Piece addict" he heard that he liked the Weekly Shōnen Jump serial manga One Piece. He was raised to one person to respect the same comic author Eiichiro Oda. Iwanaga also collects overseas manga. One Piece Film: Z talks about the impression of participating in a voice actor and a commemoration event One Piece Award held before the film release on his official blog. In addition, the blog also shows full-fledged illustrations Iwanaga drawn. His favourite manga other than One Piece are Doraemon, Slam Dunk, Black Jack and other Osamu Tezuka manga, Tobaku Haō-den Rei and other Nobuyuki Fukumoto manga, Case Closed, Basara, and Kare Kano.
- His Men's Non-no exclusive model period belongs to the Run department, participated in the December 2011 reggae marathon held in Jamaica. Iwanaga belong to the football club when he was in elementary school, and belong to basketball club after middle school. In addition, he was good at general sports other than baseball and baseball fist such as kendo, swimming etc.
- Iwanaga's favourite celebrities and artists are Rahmens, Airi Taira, B'z, Mr. Children, L'Arc-en-Ciel, Vamps, Radwimps, Masaharu Fukuyama, Hikaru Utada, Linkin Park, Eric Clapton, and Ayumi Hamasaki.
- His favourite food are strawberry sandwich and stew.
- Iwanaga's favourite character is Cheburashka.
- When he was a child, he learned the piano, the abacus, swimming, calligraphy, boy scouting.
- Along with Tatsuya Iwanaga, whom he has the same family name and similar names, formed a unit called Iwanaga Kyōdai and is active on YouTube programmes, Instagram etc.
- On May 18, 2022, Iwanaga finished Liberal Arts exam.

== Filmography ==
=== TV programmes ===
Run	Title	Network	Notes	Ref.
22 February – 5 July 2013	Terrace House: Boys × Girls Next Door	CX		
24 August 2013	Mecha-Mecha Iketeru!	CX		
12 October 2013 – 23 March 2015	Yuru Tele	CX	Ikemen Bridge Corner	
18 November 2013	Otameshika'! & Q-sama!! Gattai 2-jikan SP	EX		
31 August – 21 September 2015	Kokohore! Onē Mesen	TX		
22 April – 26 August 2016	Kinyōbi no Kikitai Onna-tachi	CX		

=== TV dramas ===
Run	Title	Role	Network	Notes	Ref.
2 October 2016 – 19 March 2017, 7 May – 27 August 2017	Kamen Rider Ex-Aid	Kuroto Dan/Kamen Rider Genm	EX	Episodes 1-23, 30-45	
21 October 2018 – 11 November 2018	Kamen Rider Zi-O	Kuroto Dan (Ep. 8-10)/Another OOO (Ep. 9-10)	EX	Episodes 8-10	

=== Films ===
Date	Title	Role	Notes	Ref.
December 2012	One Piece Film: Z		Seiyuu	
December 2016	Kamen Rider Heisei Generations: Dr. Pac-Man vs. Ex-Aid & Ghost with Legend Riders	Kuroto Dan		
March 2017	Kamen Rider × Super Sentai: Ultra Super Hero Taisen	Kamen Rider Genm (voice)		
August 2017	Kamen Rider Ex-Aid the Movie: True Ending	Kuroto Dan/Kamen Rider Genm		

=== Stage ===
Run	Title	Role	Ref.
April 2013	Blood Heaven–Dainana Tengoku Sad wings	Priest	
December 2015 – January 2016	Lemming –Sekai no Gai Made Tsuretette–		

=== Advertisements ===
Year	Brand	Product	Advert	Ref.
2013	Sony	Walkman F series		
2013	Calbee	Jagabee	Office	
2013	Calbee	Pokémon X and Y		
2014	Nissin Foods	Cup Noodles	Shūshoku Hyōgaki	
2014	Kao Corporation	Men's Biore		
2014	Seibu Shinjuku PePe			
2014	Lipton			
2015	Nikon			
2016	Kao Corporation	Nivea 8x4		

=== Internet programmes ===
Run	Title	Website	Ref.
2 May 2014 –	Iwanaga Kyōdai TV	YouTube	

=== Internet contents ===
Run	Title	Role	Website	Ref.
25 March – 8 April 2017	Kamen Sentai Gorider	Kuroto Dan / Kamen Rider Genm (voice)	au Video Pass Original Drama	

=== DVD & Blu-ray ===
Date	Title	Role
12 April 2017	Kamen Rider Snipe: Episode Zero	Kuroto Dan / Kamen Rider Genm (voice)

=== Video games ===
Year	Title	Role	Publisher
2016	Kamen Rider Battle: Ganbarizing	Kamen Rider Genm	Data Carddass

=== Magazines ===
Run	Title	Publisher	Notes
2009–14	Men's Non-no	Shueisha	Exclusive model

=== Fashion shows ===
Run	Title	Ref.
2013–14	Girls Award Terrace House Stage	
2013–14	Tokyo Girls Collection	
2013–14	Sendai Collection	

== Discography ==
=== Internet singles ===
Title	Ref.
Orpheus Aftermath of the 2011 Tōhoku earthquake and tsunami Fukkō Shien Omnibus "The Cherry Blossoms"	
