= Junon (magazine) =

Japanese magazine

- Categories: Fashion
- Frequency: Monthly
- First issue: June 1973
- Company: Shufu to Sekaitsusha
- Country: Japan
- Based in: Tokyo
- Language: Japanese
- Website: http://www.shufu.co.jp/magazine/junon/index.html

Junon is a monthly Japanese fashion magazine primarily directed towards teenage girls and women. The magazine began circulation in June 1973. In 1999 the circulation of the magazine was 380,000 copies. It is part of Shufu to Sekaitsusha company. The headquarters is in Tokyo.

Since 1988, the magazine has held the Junon Super Boy Contest, an annual contest that scouts for new magazine models.
