= Brother Tom =

Japanese singer and tarento

- Born: Tomu Koyanagi; February 23, 1956 (age 70); Maui, Hawaii, United States
- Other names: Thomas Akiona Akima Junior
- Education: Graduate of Kumagaya Industrial Senior High School
- Occupation: Singer
- Children: Shin Koyanagi; Yu Koyanagi

Brother Tom (ブラザー・トム, Burazā Tomu) (born February 23, 1956) is a Japanese singer and tarento. His birth name and former stage name is Tomu Koyanagi (小栁 富, Koyanagi Tomu), though he also goes by the English-language name of Thomas Akiona Akima Junior (トーマス・アキオナ・アキマ・ジュニア, Tōmasu Akiona Akima Junia). He is the father of two actor sons, Shin and Yu Koyanagi.

== Filmography ==
=== Films ===
- Fly Me to the Saitama (2019)
- The Memory Eraser (2020)
- Tonkatsu DJ Agetarō (2020)

=== Television ===
- Kamen Rider Ex-Aid (2017), Johnny Maxima
