= Super Hero Taisen (franchise) =

Japanese name
- Kanji: スーパーヒーロー大戦
Transcriptions
- Revised Hepburn: Supā Hīrō Taisen
- Written by: Shōji Yonemura
- Production companies: Toei Company; TV Asahi; Asatsu DK; Bandai; Kinoshita Group
- Distributed by: Toei Company
- Country: Japan
- Language: Japanese

Super Hero Taisen (スーパーヒーロー大戦, Supā Hīrō Taisen; Super Hero War) is a tokusatsu superhero film series that serves as crossovers between Toei Company's superhero productions.

In the run-up to the first film, producer Shinichiro Shirakura said he would like to make this type of movie the norm for spring films.

Currently, all five movies have been written by Shoji Yonemura. For the directors, the first two films are directed by Osamu Kaneda, the third and fourth were directed by Takayuki Shibasaki and the fifth was again directed by Osamu Kaneda.

Following the production of short films named "Net Movies" to accompany the release of OOO, Den-O, All Riders: Let's Go Kamen Riders on 2011, both Super Hero Taisen and Super Hero Taisen Z had their own series of Net Movies, Super Hero Taihen: Who Is the Culprit? and Super Hero Taisen Otsu!: Heroo! Answers respectively. While a tradition for the Kamen Rider summer movies since Kamen Rider Kiva, these Net Movies featured a new chance for Super Sentai characters to participate following their own attempt at Engine Sentai Go-onger: Boom Boom! Bang Bang! GekijōBang!! alongside Kiva failing to start the tradition for their own summer movies. However, Net Movies were not made to accompany any movie, starting with Kamen Rider Taisen.

Since their beginning, the franchise releases a film, at the very most, two weeks after their magical girl counterpart Pretty Cure All Stars.

== Films ==
Film	Release date	Director	Writer	Status
Kamen Rider × Super Sentai: Super Hero Taisen	April 21, 2012	Osamu Kaneda	Shōji Yonemura	Released
Kamen Rider × Super Sentai × Space Sheriff: Super Hero Taisen Z	April 27, 2013	Osamu Kaneda	Shōji Yonemura	Released
Heisei Rider vs. Shōwa Rider: Kamen Rider Taisen feat. Super Sentai	March 29, 2014	Takayuki Shibasaki	Shōji Yonemura	Released
Super Hero Taisen GP: Kamen Rider 3	March 21, 2015	Takayuki Shibasaki	Shōji Yonemura	Released
Kamen Rider × Super Sentai: Ultra Super Hero Taisen	March 25, 2017	Osamu Kaneda	Shōji Yonemura	Released
Saber + Zenkaiger: Super Hero Senki	July 22, 2021	Ryuta Tasaki	—N/a	Released
