= Bittomo × Heroine Kirameki Powers! =

Japanese drama

- Second promotional poster
- ビッ友x戦士 キラメキパワーズ！
- Genre: Tokusatsu, magical girl
- Created by: TOMY; OLM
- Written by: Yoichi Kato; Mao Aoki; Kana Matsui; Yuya Nakazono
- Directed by: Takashi Miike
- Starring: Tsubaki Nagayama; Hiiro Fukasawa; Yuwa Higa; Kanna Sato
- Narrated by: Atsuko Maeda
- Theme music composer: Koji Endo
- Opening theme: Fun! Fun! Fun! ~Yume∞~ by Lucky² (Ep 1-25); Brand New World by Lucky² (Ep 26-50)
- Ending theme: Kimi Suki by Lucky² (Ep 1-25); Kimi wa Darling by Lucky² (Ep 26-50)
- Country of origin: Japan
- Original language: Japanese
- No. of episodes: 50

Production
- Running time: 24 minutes (Ep 1-38); 12 minutes (Ep 39-50)
- Production companies: TV Tokyo; Dentsu; OLM

Original release
- Network: TXN (TV Tokyo)
- Release: July 11, 2021 – June 26, 2022

Related
- Police × Heroine Lovepatrina!

Bittomo × Heroine Kirameki Powers! (ビッ友x戦士 キラメキパワーズ！, Bittomo Senshi Kirameki Pawāzu!) is a Japanese tokusatsu TV drama series that began airing on July 11, 2021. It is the fifth and final installment for the Girls × Heroine Series produced by Takara Tomy and OLM, Inc. (with the assistance of Shogakukan and EXPG Studio).

The series stars Tsubaki Nagayama and Hiiro Fukasawa. Additional cast members include Kurea Masuda, Ukyo Matsumoto and Nonoka Yamaguchi. The series is also narrated by Atsuko Maeda. The plot centers around the Kirameki Powers, a duo who protect the world from the Makkura Empire, with the help of the Kirapawa Kingdom. The series celebrates the franchise's fifth anniversary.

The show launched a brief idol career for the main cast members. It was the first Girls × Heroine Series installment to be shown in Okinawa via Ryukyu Broadcasting Corporation since July 25, 2021.

On August 22, during Ciao Fest, Yuwa Higa and Kanna Sato were confirmed as the two new heroines.

From episode 39 until the series finale, the episode length was reduced from 30 to 15 minutes.

Following the show's end in 2022, it was succeeded by RizSta -Top of Artists!-.

== Plot ==
5th grade elementary school student, Kirari Momose, encounters a fairy who jumps out of a game console. The fairy, Himenyan, is actually the Princess of the Kirapawa Kingdom, a kingdom that is located inside popular sword and magic game "Kirapawa Morimori Adventure". The Princess, who was afraid of the enemy, ran away but was chased by those from the Makkura Empire. Becoming friends with Kirari, Kirari transforms into the "Heroine of the Sun, Kirapawa Sunny" where she fights the Makkura Empire. Joining with Yuzuki Shimori, Honoka Akashiro and Koyuki Aoba along the way, the four collect the Kirapawa Memories in order to win against the Witch of Darkness, Makkulala.

== Characters ==
=== Kirameki Powers ===
The Kirameki Powers is a group of four girls who fight against the Makkura Empire, in order to stop them from turning the world dark. To fight, they own the Kirapawa Memory (キラパワメモリー, Kirapawa Memorī) and transform using the brace-like Kirapawa Change (キラパワチェンジ, Kirapawa Chenji) and attack with the baton-like sceptre, the Kirapawa Baton (キラパワバトン). The Kirapawa Memory give them various abilities that they can use with the Kirapawa Change, which they can store in the Kirapawa Memory Book. As the series goes on, they are using Max Memory and Girls × Heroine Memories, which allow them to transform into Bibitto Max.

Kirari Momose (桃瀬キラリ, Momose Kirari)
Played by: Tsubaki Nagayama
An energetic 5th grade elementary school student who loves to make friends. She transforms into the "Heroine of the Sun, Kirapawa Sunny" (太陽の勇者・キラパワサニー, Taiyō no Yūsha, Kirapawa Sanī) and uses sunlight-themed attacks. Her catchphrase is, "The be-beep has come! Clear the Darkness with a Heated heart!"

Yuzuki Shimori (紫守ユヅキ, Shimori Yuzuki)
Played by: Hiiro Fukasawa
A kind and gentle hearted 2nd year middle-school student who always wants to help others. She transforms into the "Healer of the Moon, Kirapawa Moon" (月の癒し手・キラパワムーン, Tsuki no Iyashite, Kirapawa Mūn) and uses moon-themed attacks. Her catchphrase is "If I were to be of any Help! Clear the Darkness with a Healing Heart!"

Honoka Akahoshi (赤星ホノカ, Akahoshi Honoka)
Played by: Yuwa Higa
Originally a fairy named Pippii, she transforms into a human to save Kirari and Yuzuki. A bright and competitive girl who hates to lose, she is skilled in flexibility and martial arts. She holds a Kirapawa Phone to transform into the "Battle Master of Flames, Kirapawa Fine" (炎のバトルマスター・キラパワファイン, Honō no Batoru Masutā, Kirapawa Fain) and uses fire-themed attacks. Her catchphrase is "Burning Brilliantly! Clear the Darkness with a Powerful Heart!"

Koyuki Aoba (青羽コユキ, Aoba Koyuki)
Played by: Kanna Sato
Originally a fairy named Hamurii, she transforms into a human to save Kirari and Yuzuki. A mature and cool girl, she holds a Kirapawa Phone to transform into the "Witch of Snow, Kirapawa Snow" (雪の魔法使い・キラパワスノー, Yuki no Mahō Tsukai, Kirapawa Sunō) and uses snow-themed attacks. Her catchphrase is "Now is the Time to Decide! Clear the Darkness with a Sparkling Heart!"

=== Kirapawa Kingdom ===
Princess (プリンセス)

Played by: Kurea Masuda
Princess of the Kirapawa Kingdom. She ran away from the Makkura Empire and turns into the fairy, Himenyan.

Mr. Shiny (シャイニーさん, Shainī-san)

Played by: Ukyo Matsumoto
The Princess' butler. He goes to earth due to worrying about the Princess.

Himenyan (ひめにゃん)

Voiced by: Sakura Namiki
The Princess of the Kirapawa Kingdom in fairy-form. She assists the Kirameki Powers.

Pippii (ぴっぴい)

Voiced by: Saki Miyashita
A chick-like fairy and one of Himenyan's friends from the Kirapawa Kingdom. When fighting, Pippii likes to peck at people, but doesn't hurt them when she does this.

Hamurii (はむりぃ)

Voiced by: Sayumi Watabe
A hamster-like fairy and one of Himenyan's friends from the Kirapawa Kingdom. When fighting, Hamurii likes to bite people, but instead just tickles them.

=== Makkura Empire ===
Makkulala (マックララ, Makkurara)

Played by: Nonoka Yamaguchi
The Witch of Darkness who rules over the Makkura Empire.

Makkurakurasuke (マックラクラスケ)

Played by: Shion Suzuki
One of the Four Kings of the Makkura Empire.

Yamijirou (ヤミジロウ)

Played by: Satoshi Uekiya

Yamisaburou (ヤミサブロウ)

Played by: Kentaro Tamura

Claris (クラリス)

Played by: Ayumu Miyazaki

== Production ==
The series was first revealed in March 2021 after a trademark had been published, before being officially announced through news outlets on May 21, 2021, upon the release of Police × Heroine Lovepatrina!: The Movie: Challenge from a Phantom Thief! Let's Arrest with Love and a Pat!. Along with the official logo, the series released the logo for their 5th anniversary.

On Oha Suta, May 31, 2021, the Bittomo × Heroine Kirameki Powers! cast and visuals were revealed for the first time. The show stars Tsubaki Nagayama and Hiiro Fukasawa were named as the main characters. In addition to the main cast, the show's supporting cast includes Kurea Masuda from "Magical x Heroine Magimajo Pures!" and Ukyo Matsumoto from Ultraman X and Kamen Rider Ex-Aid. Nonoka Yamaguchi and Shion Suzuki were also included as part of the main cast. The cast also featured the voices of Sakura Namiki, Saki Miyashita and Sayumi Watabe, with Atsuko Maeda revealed to be the narrator. Yuwa Higa and Kanna Sato, members of idol group Lucky², were later confirmed to play the roles of Honoka and Koyuki.

== Media ==
=== Episodes ===
Bittomo × Heroine Kirameki Powers! is broadcast weekly from July 11, 2021 on TV Tokyo at 9:00 AM.

No.	Title	Directed by	Written by	Original release date
1	"B-Beep Bittomo! Kirameki Powers!" "Bibiitto Bittomo! Kirameki Pawaazu!" (ビビーッとビッ友！キラメキパワーズ！)	Takashi Miike	Yōichi Katō	July 11, 2021
Kirari Momose is a 5th grade elementary school student with a heated dancing heart that always beeps. One day she meets Himenyan, the princess who transformed into a cat after jumping out of the popular game “Kiramori”. The enemy, the Witch of Darkness from the Makkura Empire chases her and she is suddenly in big trouble. Kirari decides to confront her in order to protect Himenyan. Seeing that front, Himenyan appoints Kirari to become a Kirameki Powers.
2	"Find the Second Kirameki Powers!" "Futari-me no Kirameki Pawaazu o Sagase!" (二人目のキラメキパワーズを探せ！)	Takashi Miike	Yōichi Katō	July 18, 2021
Kirari who has become Kirameki Powers immediately tries to defeat the Witch of Darkness, Makkulala, but is stopped by Himenyan's butler Mr. Shiny. He says that right now, they must collect Kirapawa Memory and find the second Kirameki Powers. Kirari and Himenyan go to the park to find the Kirapawa but a Yami whose heart is wrapped in darkness by the Makkura Empire appears!
3	"Healer of the Moon! Kirapawa Moon, Yuzuki!" "Tsuki no Iyashite! Kirapawa Muun, Yuzuki!" (月の癒し手！キラパワムーン・ユヅキ！)	Takashi Miike	Yōichi Katō	July 25, 2021
Yuzuki Shimori who has a kind heart and wants to help heal others, transforms into Kirapawa Moon to help Kirapawa Sunny who is in trouble while fighting the Four Kings of Darkness Makkurakurasuke. She helps restore Kirapawa Sunny who is wrapped in a bandage of darkness. The now two member Kirapawa's combine their power and confront Makkurakurasuke. Will they be able to beat him!?
4	"Chase after Hamurii and Pippii!" "Hamurii to Pippii o Oe!" (はむりぃとぴっぴぃを追え！)	Ryusuke Kurahashi	Yōichi Katō	August 1, 2021
Kirari and Yuzuki go searching for Hamurii and Pippii. However, Hamurii and Pippii run away thinking that the two are minions of the Makkura Empire. When chasing after them, Pippii is turned into a Yami. Kirari and Yuzuki transform into Kirameki Powers in order to restore them.
5	"Take Care of Himenyan!" "Himenyan o Oteateseyo!" (ひめにゃんをお手当てせよ！)	Ryusuke Kurahashi	Kana Matsui	August 8, 2021
Himenyan gets a fever and falls asleep, Yuzuki stays up all night to help her but she doesn't get any better. The two leap up in a hurry after hearing from Mr. Shiny that Himenyan's favorite food is the “Illusionary Strawberry”. As they're searching, a Yami appears. It appears at the hospital Yuzuki's mom works at. They transform into Kirameki Powers in order to restore the patient who has been turned into a Yami.
6	"Heal Himenyan with Sound!" "Himenyan o Oto de Iyase!!" (ひめにゃんを音で癒せ！)	Ryusuke Kurahashi	Kana Matsui	August 15, 2021
For Himenyan who is still not well, Kirari and Yuzuki try to listen to their favorite music. Kirari asks her classmate Chopin who is good at playing piano, but he refuses. Yuzuki tells her she may have been too pushy and Kirari contemplates her actions. Just then, Chopin is turned into a Yami. Kirari and Yuzuki transform into Kirameki Powers to restore Chopin.
7	"Search for the Strongest Bittomo in Love!" "Saikyou ni Rabutteru Bittomo o Sagase!" (最強にラブってるビッ友を探せ！)	Takeshi Yokoi	Mao Aoki	August 22, 2021
Yuzuki has been busy with school activities so Kirari heads out on her own to the strongest road in order to clear the request “Search for the strongest bittomo”. However! The “Police x Heroine Lovepatrina” appear there! Were the strongest bittomo the Lovepat's? But while surprised, a Yami appears. But the Yami turns out to be Lovepat Pink. Will Kirari be able to restore her safely!?
8	"Stop Makkulala's Ambitions" "Makkura no Yabou o Yamero!" (マックララの野望を止めろ！)	Takeshi Yokoi	Yūya Nakazono	August 29, 2021
Kirari has a dream that the world is wrapped in darkness. Kirari and Yuzuki ask Himenyan and Mr. Shiny what Makkura Empire are trying to do. They wonder how to stop Makkura Empire's ambitions. While looking back on the past, they learn about the powers the Kirameki Powers items have.
9	"Protect Kirapawa's Secret!" "Kirapawa no Himitsu o Mamore!" (キラパワのひみつを守れ！)	Takeshi Yokoi	Mao Aoki	September 5, 2021
A young boy heads to the Bittomo Cafe to learn more about the Kirapawa. His name is Kento Kiriyama. He has been live-streaming their fights up until then. To protect the Kirapawa's secret, Yuzuki chases after him. There at a Kirapawa research society, Kento turns into a Yami. Yuzuki transforms alone to help Kento.
10	"Get the Hidden Treasure Metamor Memory!" "Hihou Metamoru Memorii o te ni ireyo!" (秘宝メタモルメモリーを手に入れよ！)	Ken'ichiro Nishiumi	Yūya Nakazono	September 12, 2021
They finally have all the pieces that shows the location of the Metamor Memory. But because there were two different locations, they split and go to them. Kirari is headed off to a wedding hall. The wedding hall however is in chaos, as the bride who was supposed to have a wedding, is turned into a Yami. Kirari transforms into Kirapawa and tries to restore her. Can they really get the Metamor Memory?
11	"The Decisive Battle of the Metamor Memory!" "Metamoru Memorii no Kessen!" (メタモルメモリーの決戦！)	Ken'ichiro Nishiumi	Yōichi Katō	September 19, 2021
Guided by the Metamor Piece, Kirari and Yuzuki finally arrive at the place where the Metamor Memory is but suddenly, Makkurakurasuke appears. However, stronger than usual after a power up, he turns into a Dark Knight. Kirari and Yuzuki are suddenly hit by a powerful attack and are in big trouble. At that time, Hamurii and Pippii appear, squeezing out their courage to confront the Dark Knight.
12	"Kirapawa Fine! Kirapawa Snow!" "Kirapawa Fain! Kirapawa Sunoo!" (キラパワファイン！ キラパワスノー！)	Ken'ichiro Nishiumi	Yōichi Katō	September 26, 2021
With the power of the Metamor Memory, Hamurii and Pippii become humans! Honoka Akahoshi and Koyuki Aoba receive the Kirapawa Phone from Himenyan and thus transform into Kirapawa's. They challenge the Dark Knight with an attack using the Kirapawa Ribbon. Will they be able to defeat the Dark Knight!?
13	"Investigate Makkura Empire's New Schemes!" "Makkura Teikoku no Aratana Takurami o Sagure!" (マックラ帝国の新たなたくらみを探れ！)	Ryusuke Kurahashi	Kana Matsui	October 3, 2021
Honoka and Koyuki attend the same middle school as Yuzuki. Honoka wonders which club she should attend after being invite to many while Koyuki decides to join the chemistry club after being fascinated by their experiments. However, two new 4 Kings of Darkness appears, Yamijirou and Yamisaburou who turn the chemistry teacher into a Dark Yami. The 4 Kirapawa's transform together to restore the teacher.
14	"Unleash the New Power of the Kirapawa Phone!" "Kirapawa Fon no Aratana Chikara o Tokihanate" (キラパワフォンの新たな力を解き放て！)	Ryusuke Kurahashi	Kana Matsui	October 10, 2021
The Kirapawa phone has a locked app but the quest this time is to unlock it. Honoka and Koyuki leap into action after learning there are hints hidden at a fashion event. At the events venue, panic ensues as a fashion designer is turned into a Dark Yami. The two transform to restore the designer. Will they be able to unleash the power of the Kirapawa Phone?
15	"Level Up Kirari and Yuzuki!" "Kirari to Yuzuki Reberu Appu Seyo!" (キラリとユヅキ レベルアップせよ！)	Ryusuke Kurahashi	Mao Aoki	October 17, 2021
Kirari and Yuzuki go temple training to reach the same level as Honoka and Koyuki. A kind priest welcomes them there. Kirari and Yuzuki work hard to practice by cleaning the temple but the priest is turned into a Dark Yami. The two transform and confront him in order to restore him. Can Kirari and Yuzuki level up!?
16	"Use the Magic of Snow!" "Yuki no Mahou o Tsukai Konase!" (雪の魔法を使いこなせ！)	Takeshi Yokoi	Mao Aoki	October 24, 2021
To be able to clear the quest in relation to the magic of snow, Koyuki stays up all night studying and reading an immense amount of magic books. After the others are worried that she's overdoing it, to refresh herself, she takes a walk. While on this walk, she meets a mother searching for her daughter. Koyuki decides to join her on her search. At the park they find a little girl with a look of relief however the mother is turned into a Dark Yami. Koyuki must transform alone to get her back.
17	"Win the Battle of Flames!" "Honoo no Batoru ni Shouriseyo!" (炎のバトルに勝利せよ！)	Takeshi Yokoi	Yūya Nakazono, Yōichi Katō	October 31, 2021
Honoka is excited that it is her turn when a battle of flames quest appears. Finding cooking battle flyers, she believes this is the battle of flames and participates. When she goes to the venue with Himenyan, the patissier is turned into a Dark Yami. Honoka transforms alone to save her but Yamisaburo was secretly watching the battle.
18	"Rescue the Kidnapped Honoka!" "Toraware no Honoka o Sukuidase!" (捕らわれのホノカを救い出せ！)	Takeshi Yokoi	Yūya Nakazono; Yōichi Katō	November 7, 2021
Honoka was able to deceive Yamisaburo by disguising herself as Princess. However, she is being held captive in Makkura Castle instead of Princess. After Himenyan heard of the situation, Kirari and the others try to rescue her but are unable to since they don't know where the castle is located. At this time, Makkulala begins to suspect that the princess is fake.
19	"Defeat the Kings of Darkness’ Dark Ogre!" "Yami no Shitennou Daaku Ooga o Taose!" (ヤミの四天王ダークオーガを倒せ！)	Takeshi Yokoi	Yūya Nakazono; Yōichi Katō	November 14, 2021
Yamijirou stands before Kirari and the others who have come to save Honoka. Yamijirou drank the dark juice and powers up into the Dark Ogre. Kirari and the others struggle with the overwhelming power. Honoka wants to go help her fiends who have come to save her, but she's being watched by Yamisaburou and can't escape. At that time, the feelings of thinking of each other, causes a miracle.
20	"Mr. Shiny's Reward!" "Shainii-san no Gohoubi!" (シャイニーさんのごほうび！)	Ken'ichiro Nishiumi	Kana Matsui	November 21, 2021
They were able to rescue Honoka safely, but the next quest is “For the power of the Heroine's!”. Everyone is thinking of taking a nap but Mr. Shiny presents them with a luxurious French full-course meal voucher! Everyone is overjoyed. He says it's a reward for always protecting Himenyan. With that being said, the Kirapawa girls recall all the battles they have done so far.
21	"O Heroine of the Sun, Level Up Immediately!" "Taiyou no Yuusha yo, Shikyuu Reberu Appuseyo!" (太陽の勇者よ、至急レベルアップせよ！)	Ken'ichiro Nishiumi	Kana Matsui	November 28, 2021
The quest "level up immediately" appears but Kirari has no idea on what to do at all. She comes up with the idea of going to ask Kento, someone who is familiar with the game. Kento is co-starring on a popular MeTube and she decides to head to the recording site. Just then, the MeTuber is turned into a Dark Yami. Kirari transforms by herself to restore it but can she really level up!?
22	"Explore the Worst Weapon of the Makkura Empire!" "Makkura Teikoku Saikyou no Buki no Nazo o Sagure!" (マックラ帝国最凶の武器のナゾを探れ！)	Ryusuke Kurahashi	Mao Aoki	December 5, 2021
It seems like Yamisaburou is developing some sort of terrifying weapon. When Honoka and Koyuki are leaving the school, talking about the weapon, they find Yamijirou helping the gardener and doing his best as it seems that he likes trees and flowers. Suddenly, Yamisaburou appears and turns the gardener into a Dark Yami. The two transform into Kirapawa to restore him.
23	"Decisive Battle! The Strongest Brothers of the 4 Dark Kings!" "Kessen! Yami no Shitennou-kai Saikyou no Kyoudai!" (決戦！ヤミの四天王界最強の兄弟！)	Ryusuke Kurahashi	Mao Aoki	December 12, 2021
Kirari and her friends are worried about Yamijirou who has been taken away by Yamisaburou. Just then, on the news, they learn of a mysterious monster that appeared in the town. There, being displayed, was Yamijirou. He has been transformed into a weapon by his younger brother, Yamisaburou, and is making people disappear somewhere. Kirari and the others hurriedly transform and head towards the scene.
24	"Defeat the Four Kings of Darkness' Dark Geek!" "Yami no Shitennou Daaku Giiku o Taose!" (ヤミの四天王ダークギークを倒せ！)	Ryusuke Kurahashi	Mao Aoki	December 19, 2021
Due to Yamijirou's attack, Yuzuki, Honoka and Koyuki disappeared. Kirari tries to fight though she is alone but Yamisaburou powers up into “Dark Geek”. The Kirapawa's are cornered but they don't give up. But at that moment, the Bittomo feelings Yamijirou had in his heart creates a miracle!?
25	"Explore the Secret of the Heroines!" "Densetsu no Senshi no Himitsu o Sagure!" (伝説の戦士のひみつを探れ！)	Ryusuke Kurahashi	Mao Aoki	December 26, 2021
The Kirapawa successfully escape Makkulala and return safely, but are upset they were unable to help Yamisaburou and Yamijirou. At that time, a mysterious girl appears in their dream and tells them that horrifying things are approaching the Kirapawa. In order to confront what was coming, it seems necessary to receive the power from the legendary heroines. Kirari and the others began their search for the legendary heroines.
26	"Investigate the New Four Kings!" "Aratana Shitennou o Sagure!" (新たな四天王を探れ！)	Takeshi Yokoi	Kana Matsui	January 9, 2022
Himenyan has been taken away by the new Four Kings, Claris. Kirari and the others transform into Kirapawa to go rescue her. There, they meet a really cute little girl. Discovering that there's a little girl who is part of the Four Kings, they're surprised. However, when they try to fight her, she was so strong they were unable to defeat her. Can they really rescue Himenyan from Claris!?
27	"The Strongest Red Heroine - Find the Secret of Phantomi Dia" "Saikyou no Aka no Senshi - Fantomi Daiya no Himitsu o Sagure!" (最強の赤の戦士・ファントミダイヤのひみつを探れ)	Takeshi Yokoi	Kana Matsui	January 16, 2022
Kirari and the others realise that they need to power up to defeat Claris, this, they try to gather the Girls Heroine Memory. First, Honoka visits Phantomirage's Seira to find out the secret of the strongest red heroine. Seira had been attending a dance audition when one of the dancers turned into a Kura-Yammy. Honoka and Seira must then fight together.
28	"Take Back Himenyan!" "Himenyan wo Torimodose!" (ひめにゃんを取り戻せ！)	Takeshi Yokoi	Kana Matsui	January 23, 2022
Kirari and the other receive a letter from Claris, asking them to challenge her at a designated location to get back Himenyan. However, only Claris is there but she knows where Himenyan is. They try to fight her immediately but Claris doesn't care and just plays. They try to counter attack with the Phantomi Trick which has all of the Phantomirage's feelings. Can they save Himenyan!?
29	"Investigate the Secret of the Purple Magic Heroine!" "Murasaki no Mahou Senshi no Himitsu wo Sagure!" (紫の魔法戦士のひみつを探れ！)	Ken'ichiro Nishiumi	Yūya Nakazono	January 30, 2022
They manage to save Himenyan by fighting Claris, however, Himenyan was cursed by Claris. They must defeat Claris as soon as possible in order to break her curse. The girls decide to search for the remaining Girls Heroine Memories so they can defeat Claris. Yuzuki visits Shiori of MagimajoPures to find out the secrets of the Magical Heroines.
30	"Find the Missing Himenyan!" "Kieta Himenyan wo Sagase!" (消えたひめにゃんを探せ！)	Ken'ichiro Nishiumi	Yūya Nakazono	February 6, 2022
Himenyan was cursed by Claris to turn into a kitten. After taking their eyes off her, Himenyan who is now a kitten, ran away. Kirari and the others hurriedly go outside to look for her. They look desperately but are in trouble because they can't find her, when they suddenly meet an older boy who loves cats. When they try to talk to him, he suddenly turns into a Kura-Yammy. The girls transform into Kirapawa to help him out.
31	"Investigate the Secret of the Legendary Blue Warrior" "Densetsu no Ao no Senshi no Himitsu wo Sagure!" (伝説の青の戦士のひみつを探れ！)	Ken'ichiro Nishiumi	Mao Aoki	February 13, 2022
In order to find out the secret of the blue warrior, Koyuki goes to find Fuka of Miracle Tunes alone. Fuka was about to say an important announcement at a press conference. But then, the reporter was made into a Kura-Yammy creating large panic. Koyuki must fight alongside Fuka to restore the reporter. Will she be able to get the Miracle Tunes Memory?
32	"Get the Last Girls x Heroine Memory!" "Saigo no Gāruzu Senshi Memorī o Getto seyo!" (最後のガールズ戦士メモリーをゲットせよ！)	Ken'ichiro Nishiumi	Mao Aoki	February 20, 2022
Finally, there is only one Girls Warrior memory left. The last one is the Lovepatrina Memory. However, Sarai of Lovepatrina did not appear on the game screen. Kirari and the others decide to go to see her in person, but on the way, the musical actor's older brother is turned into a Kura-Yammy. Kirari and the others transformed into Kirapawa to help him.
33	"Awaken the True Power of Kirapawa!" "Kirapawa no Shin no Chikara ni Mezameyo!" (キラパワの真の力に目覚めよ！)	Ryusuke Kurahashi	Kana Matsui	February 27, 2022
Kirari and the others had collected all the Girls x Heroine Memories, but in order to power up, it was necessary to awaken to the true power of Kirapawa. At this rate, Himenyan's curse would be completed, so they had to battle with Claris. They used the Girls x Heroine Memories that they have collected so far, but Kirari and the others struggle. Can they really awaken the true power!??
34	"Clear Claris' Darkness with Bibitto Max!" "Bibitto Makkusu de Kurarisu no yami o harase!" (ビビっとマックスでクラリスの闇を晴らせ！)	Ryusuke Kurahashi	Kana Matsui	March 6, 2022
Kirari and her friends were able to awaken the true power of Kirapawa and become "Bibitto Max", now they will try to clear Claris' darkness with this new sparkling power. However, Claris is even more serious and launches a fierce attack. The Kirapawa will use the Girls x Heroine Memories that they have obtained so far to counter her. Can they really clear Claris' darkness!?
35	"Save Claris!" "Kurarisu wo Sukue!" (クラリスを救え！)	Ryusuke Kurahashi	Yūya Nakazono	March 13, 2022
Kirari and her friends had a strategy meeting to help Claris, who had been taken away by Makkulala. When they became depressed because they didn't know how to help, the Max Memory in the memory book suddenly shone and wrapped up the four girls in light. Then, remembering the thoughts and new powers they had inherited, Kirari and her friends cleared the quest to save Claris.
36	"Find the map that leads to Claris!" "Kurarisu e to Tsuzuku Chizu wo Sagase!" (クラリスへと続く地図を探せ！)	Takeshi Yokoi	Mao Aoki	March 20, 2022
In order to obtain a map that leads to Claris, Kirari is looking for a doctor who knows where the map is. However, he ends up at a cheese shop, mistaking the map for the cheese. There was a large selection of very delicious cheeses. Сheese craftsman is turned into a Kura-Yammy. Kirari transforms alone to save him. Will she be able to find the map!?
37	"Collect the pieces of cheese leading to Claris!" "Kurarisu e to Tsuzuku Chiizu wo Kansei Saseyo!" (クラリスへと続くチーズを完成させよ！)	Takeshi Yokoi	Mao Aoki	March 27, 2022
Kirari manages to get a piece of cheese! They turned into a map leading to Claris. Kirari and others come to the restaurant looking for the remaining pieces. The Restaurant's chef is turned into Kura-Yammy. To save him, the girls transform into Kirapawa. Will they be able to get the remaining pieces to complete the entire map!?
38	"Obtain the key to the dungeon!" "Danjon no Kagi wo Te ni Ireyo!" (ダンジョンのカギを手に入れよ！)	Ken'ichiro Nishiumi	Yūya Nakazono	April 3, 2022
Kirari and others completed collect a dungeon map leading to Claris. If they had the key, they could save Claris, but girls did not know where it was hidden. Yuzuki asks about the key to the dungeon at school, but nobody knows. When she despaired, the teacher told her what she knew. However, when she tries to ask to help, the teacher turns into Kura-Yammy. Will Yuzuki be able to get the key to the dungeon!?
39	"Find the entrance to hidden dungeon!" "Kakushi Danjon no Iriguchi wo Sagase!" (隠しダンジョンの入り口を探せ！)	Ken'ichiro Nishiumi	Yūya Nakazano	April 10, 2022
Kirari and her friends headed towards the hidden dungeon leading to Claris, but the forest was so vast that they could not figure out where the entrance was. When everyone split up and started searching, Honoka finds a fortune telling hall. Going inside, the fortuneteller begins told her about Claris. Will the girls be able to find the entrance to the dungeon!?
40	"Honoka's flame battle with the Fortuneteller!" "Honoka En no Uranai Batoru!" (ホノカ炎の占いバトル！)	Ken'ichiro Nishiumi	Yūya Nakazano	April 17, 2022
Honoka fell into the fortuneteller's trap who was turned into Makkura-Yammy. The outcome of the battle tilts towards Uranai Makura-Yammy, and Honoka is backed into a corner. At that moment, she remembered Claris and tried not to panic. Will Honoka be able to clear Makkura-Yammy and find the entrance to dungeon!?
41	"Find Claris!" "Kurarisu wo Sagashidase!" (クラリスを探しだせ！)	Ryusuke Kurahashi	Kana Matsui	April 24, 2022
Kirari and her friends are finally able to enter the hidden dungeon where is Claris located. They transform into Bibitto Max form and gradually advance, defeating Yammy along the way. However, they have reached a dead end and there is no way forward. Looking closer, they saw something similar to encrypted text. Will girls be able to unravel the mystery of code and get to Claris!?
42	"Big pinch! Dark Claris VS Kirapawa!" "Dai pinchi! DaaKurarisu VS Kirapawa!" (大ピンチ！ ダークラリスVSキラパワ！)	Ryusuke Kurahashi	Kana Matsui	May 1, 2022
Kirari and the others were finally able to meet Claris. However, Makkulala turned Claris into Dark Claris, the darkness heroine. Kirari and girls didn't know how respond to Claris' attack. They desperately call out to try make her remember them, but she doesn't answer. At this moment, a drawing by Claris falls in front of them. There was Claris' response.
43	"Clear the Dark Claris' darkness!" "DaaKurarisu no Yami wo Harase!" (ダークラリスの闇を晴らせ！)	Ryusuke Kurahashi	Kana Matsui	May 8, 2022
Claris looks at herself drawing and tries to remember Kirapawa and others. However, Makkulala's dark power got in the way. Blocking Claris' attacks, Kirari and her friends use Royal Dream Purelize to break the dark seal. Claris remembers about her dream. Will Claris be able to clear up her darkness!?
44	"Revival the Hero of Light!" "Hikari no Yuusha wo Yomigaeraseyo!" (光の勇者をよみがえらせよ！)	Ryusuke Kurahashi	Mao Aoki	May 15, 2022
Together, Kirari and others were able to clear Claris from darkness. However, Makkulala releases the dark power that she has accumulated over all this time. And a large amount of this power envelops the world. Kirari with her friends try to defeat Makkulala, but are unable to get out because lock prevents them from leaving. At this time, a new quest appears, and girls go in search of the Hero of Light.
45	"Complete all Kirapawa Memories!" "Kirapawa Memorii wo Conpuriito seyo!" (キラパワメモリーをコンプリートせよ！)	Takeshi Yokoi	Mao Aoki	May 22, 2022
It was necessary to collect all the Kirapawa Memories in order to fight Makkulala. Kirari and her friends come to the game company that developed Kiramori. There they meet game developer Mr. Mitsuno. He tells how "Kiramori" was born. And also told how scary Makkulala is. Will the girls be able to get last memory!?
46	"Final Quest! Defeat Makkulala!" "Saigo no Kuesuto! Makkurara wo Taose!" (最後のクエスト！ マックララを倒せ！)	Takeshi Yokoi	Yōichi Katō	May 29, 2022
The quest "Defeat Makkulala, the Dark Witch of the Makkura Empire" has been unlocked and it's finally time to fight. The Kirapawa transform, but suddenly Makkulala's magic sends them to the World of Darkness. Makkulala tries to aim at Himenyan, but Kirari with friends desperately defend her. However, Makkulala's power is too great for girls to compete with. What do they need to do!?
47	"Kirameki Powers shrouded in darkness!" "Yami ni Tsutsumareta Kirameki Pawaazu!" (闇に包まれたキラメキパワーズ！)	Takeshi Yokoi	Yōichi Katō	June 5, 2022
Kirari and her friends are exposed to Makkulala's dark magic. They gradually stop paying attention to the difference in power between them and Makkulala, and if this continues, they will be completely shrouded in darkness. Even despite this, they remember everything that has happened so far and their best friends. Will girls be able to clear away the darkness in their hearts!? And will Kirameki be able to awaken love in Makkulala!?
48	"To Kirapawa Kingdom! Makkulala's trap!" "Kirapawa Ookoku e! Makkurara no Wana!" (キラパワ王国へ！ マックララの罠！)	Takeshi Yokoi	Yōichi Katō	June 12, 2022
Makkulala felt that the spark in her heart was about to awaken and she escaped, opening the door to the Kirapawa Kingdom. Kirari and her friends arrived in the Kirapawa Kingdom in search of Makkulala, but it was no longer the kingdom they knew, it had turned to darkness. Makkulala absorbs the darkness power and becomes more powerful. The final battle will lastly begin. Wonder what will happen!?
49	"Final Battle! Make Makkulala sparkle!" "Saigo no Tatakai! Makkurara wo Kiramekasero!" (最後の戦い！ マックララをキラめかせろ！)	Takeshi Yokoi	Yōichi Katō	June 19, 2022
Kirari and her friends aren't going to give up, even when they are Makkulala attacked. She was surprised by this. As Kirari and others firmly decided that they would somehow make Makkulala sparkle, they heard the sounds of many Bittomo Whistles coming from somewhere. A lot of sparkling power fell on girls. Will Makkulala's darkness be cleared up!?
50	"Kirameki Powers are forever!" "Kirameki Pawaazu wa Eien ni!" (キラメキパワーズは永遠に！)	Takeshi Yokoi	Mao Aoki	June 26, 2022
Kirari and her friends have finally cleared Makkulala's darkness. And Himenyan was able return to her Princess form. Kirapawa Kingdom, shrouded in darkness, returns to its former appearance with the help of Princess' magic, and girls return to Human World. Bittomo Cafe will cease of exist, and what will happen to everyone now!?
