= Nonoka Yamaguchi =

Japanese dancer, actress and model (born 1998)

- 山口乃々華
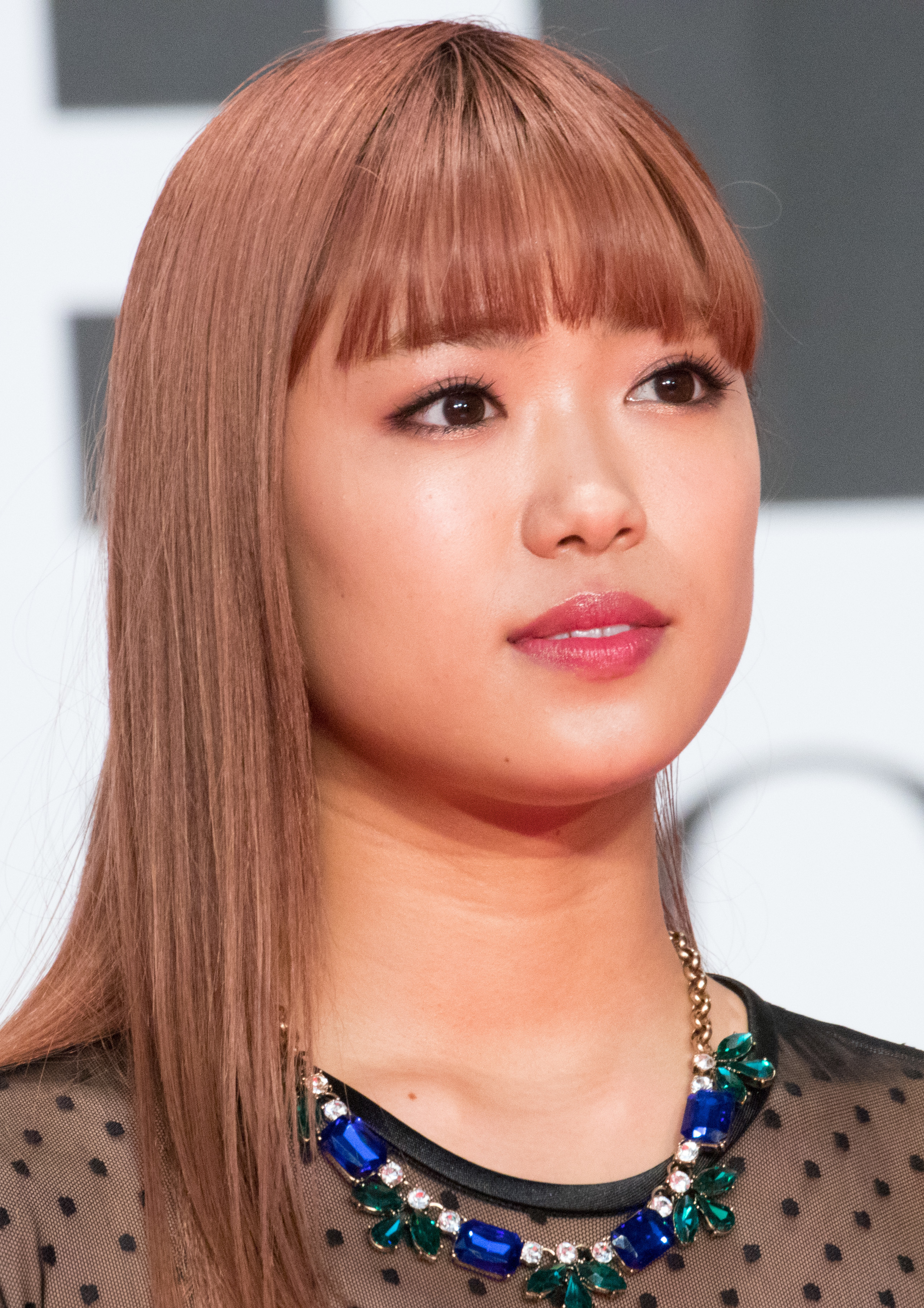
- Yamaguchi in 2016
- Born: 8 March 1998 (age 28); Kasukabe, Saitama, Japan
- Occupations: Dancer, actress, model
- Years active: 2007-present
- Agent: LDH
- Musical career
- Genres: J-pop, Dance
- Label: Rhythm Zone
- Formerly of: E-girls

Nonoka Yamaguchi (山口乃々華, Yamaguchi Nonoka, born March 8, 1998) is a Japanese dancer, actress, and model. She is a former member of J-Pop group E-girls under LDH.

== Early life ==
Yamaguchi was born on March 8, 1998, in Kasukabe, Saitama, Japan. She started her modeling career as a child after winning the special award for reader model of the magazine Shogaku shinensei (小学四年生) in 2007. A year later, she also won the semi-grand prix award for reader model of the magazine Shogaku gonensei (小学五年生). Prior to auditioning for LDH, she started having training classes at EXPG Tokyo in 2009. In 2010, Yamaguchi won the grand prix award at the 18th Pichi Lemon Audition, and started working as an exclusive model for the magazine Pichi Lemon.

== Career ==
In 2011, she participated of the EXILE Presents VOCAL BATTLE AUDITION 3 ~For Girls~ in the dance section and successfully passed the audition and became part of the non-debuted dance group bunny as a performer.

On August 23, 2012, she was announced as an official member of E-girls as part of bunny.

In July, 2013, Yamaguchi made her acting debut on the TV drama Ashita no Hikari wo Tsukame -2013 Natsu-.

In December, 2014, she graduated from Pichi Lemon, appearing for the last time as an exclusive model of the magazine in the January 2015 issue.

In June 2018 Yamaguchi attended the red carpet event of the Short Shorts Film Festival & Asia (SSFF & ASIA), at which the Utamonogatari - Cinema Fighters Project -, in which she participated as an actress, premiered.

On December 22, 2019, with the announcement of E-girls' disbandment set for around the end of 2020, it was revealed that Yamaguchi would focus on acting and modeling activities afterwards.

In 2020, she took on her first leading role in the live-action adaption of the manga Kiss Him, Not Me. She starred as Kae Serinuma, a fujoshi that suddenly gets the attention of four popular boys in her high school. Furthermore, Yamaguchi was chosen to narrate a documentary about the success of fellow LDH group Girls^{2} titled Girls^{2} ~The Miracle of 9~ which aired on TV Tokyo on March 22 and March 29.

== Filmography ==
To see her appearances with E-girls, see E-girls

=== TV Dramas ===
Year	Title	Role	Network	Notes	Ref.
2013	Asu no Hikari o Tsukame -2013 Natsu-	Dance member	Tokai TV/Fuji TV		
2014	A Perfect Day for Love Letters / Koibumi Biyori	Kaede Tachibana	NTV	Episode 7; Lead role	
2015	High & Low The Story Of S.W.O.R.D	Nonoriki	NTV		
2016	High & Low Season 2	Nonoriki	NTV		
2017	High & Low The DTC	Nonoriki	Hulu	Episode 10	
2018	Gakeppuchi Hotel!	Maika Nakajima	Hulu	Last Episode	
2021	Bittomo x Heroine Kirameki Powers!	Makkulala	TV Tokyo		

=== Films ===
Year	Title	Role	Notes	Ref.
2016	High & Low: The Movie	Nonoriki		
2016	Mischievous Kiss the Movie Part 1: High School	Satomi Ishikawa		
2017	Mischievous Kiss the Movie Part 2: Campus	Satomi Ishikawa		
2017	Mischievous Kiss the Movie Part 3: Propose	Satomi Ishikawa		
2017	High & Low: The Movie 2 - End of SKY	Nonoriki		
2017	High & Low: The Movie 3 - Final Mission	Nonoriki		
2017	Wakare Uta	Eriko Togami	Short film	
2018	Utamonogatari - Cinema Fighters Project - "Kuu"	Hana	Short film	
2020	Kiss Him, Not Me / Watashi ga Motete Dousunda	Kae Serinuma	Lead role	

=== Stage ===
Year	Title	Role	Ref.
2019	Music recital drama Heaven's Record ~ Blue Sky ~ 2019		
2020	Reading drama Book Act "Entertainer Exchange Diary / Geinin koukan nikki"		
2020	Stage play WELL ~View from the bottom of the well~		
2025	Peter Pan	Wendy Darling	

=== Internet programs ===
Year	Title	Network	Ref.
2019–present	Hotto Hitoiki! Nonoriki Cafe	cookpadLive	

=== Commercials ===
Year	Title	Notes	Ref.
2015	Recruit Rikunabi Shingaku	with Anna Ishii	
2017	& chouette	with other E-girls members directed by Nicola Formichetti	
2019	Samantha Thavasa 25th		
2019	Mister Donut "Tap！Tap！Tapioca！"	with other E-girls members	
2019	Mister Donut "Cotton Snow Candy"		
2019	Yofuku no Aoyama	with other E-girls members	

=== Music videos ===
Year	Song	Artist
2009	"Someday" (Kodomo Version)	Exile
2019	"ONE -we are one-"	Samantha Thavasa Family

== Other works ==
=== Essay serialization ===
Year	Title	Magazine	Ref.
2019-present	Nonopedia	GINGER web	

=== Magazines ===
Year	Title	Notes	Ref.
2007	Shogaku shinensei (小学四年生)	Reader model	
2008	Shogaku gonensei (小学五年生)	Reader model	
2010-2015	Pichi Lemon	Exclusive model	

=== Runways ===
Year	Title	Season	Ref.
2012	Girls Award	Autumn/Winter	
2014	Tokyo Runway	Spring/Summer	
2017	Girls Award	Autumn/Winter	
2018	Girls Award	Autumn/Winter	

=== Advertisements ===
Year	Title	Ref.
2012	PLUS Corporation "norino beans"	
2020	Sogo Seibu "HAPPY WHITE DAY FOR ME"	
