= Police × Heroine Lovepatrina! =

- First promotional poster
- ポリス×戦士 ラブパトリーナ！
- Genre: Tokusatsu, magical girl, children
- Created by: TOMY; OLM
- Written by: Yoichi Kato; Mao Aoki; Kana Matsui; Yuya Nakazono
- Starring: Miyu Watanabe; Rina Yamaguchi; Yui Yamashita; Yura Sugiura
- Narrated by: Toshiyuki Toyonaga
- Theme music composer: Koji Endo
- Opening theme: "Daiji na Mono" by Girls² feat. Lovely² (ep 1-23); "Girls Revolution" by Girls² (eps 24-48)
- Ending theme: "Maru Batsu Sankaku" by Lovely² (episode 1-11); "Twirlin' Rintantan" by Lovely² (episode 12-23); "LOVE²" by Lovely² (episode 24-35); "Yumemitai Tsutaetai" by Lovely² (episode 36-48)
- Country of origin: Japan
- Original language: Japanese
- No. of episodes: 48

Production
- Producer: Misako Saka
- Running time: 24 minutes
- Production companies: TV Tokyo; Dentsu; OLM

Original release
- Network: TXN (TV Tokyo)
- Release: July 26, 2020 – June 27, 2021

Related
- Secret × Heroine Phantomirage!; Bittomo × Heroine Kirameki Powers!

Police × Heroine Lovepatrina! (ポリス×戦士 ラブパトリーナ!, Porisu Senshi Rabupatorīna!) is a Japanese Tokusatsu TV drama series that aired from July 26, 2020, until June 27, 2021. It is the fourth installment in the Girls × Heroine Series produced by Takara Tomy and OLM, Inc. (with the assistance of Shogakukan and EXPG Studio).

The series stars Miyu Watanabe, Rina Yamaguchi, Yui Yamashita and Yura Sugiura. Additional cast members include Keiji Kuroki and Saeko Kamijō. The plot centers around Lovepatrina, a group of young girls who protect love from the antagonist Warupyoko, who plans on removing love from the world to create his own.

The show launched a brief idol career for the main cast members, who perform as the Japanese idol girl group lovely². Following the show's end in 2021, it was succeeded by Bittomo × Heroine Kirameki Powers!

== Plot ==
A girl named Tsubasa Aiba is nominated to become a Lovepatrina after meeting a rabbit-like fairy from Mimipyoco named Lovepyoco. In order to save her mom, whose love has been taken by the Warupyoco Troupe—a team of villains trying to steal the world's love—she transforms into a Lovepatrina, Lovepat Pink. With the guidance of Director Loveji, she fights alongside Sarai, a cheerful girl with a mysterious past and Kohana, an honor student and athlete. Later, Sora joins the team, making Lovepatrina a quartet.

== Characters ==
=== Lovepatrina ===
Lovepatrina is a group of four girls who fight against the Warupyoco Troupe from stealing the love from the world. In order to stop them, they own the Lovepat Cards (ラブパトカード, Rabupato Kādo) and transform using the casket-like device, the Lovepat Shuffle (ラブパトシャッフル, Rabupato Shaffuru) and attack with the scepter-like weapon, the Lovepat Wing (ラブパトウィング, Rabupato Wingu). The Lovepat Cards give them various abilities they can use with the Lovepat Shuffle. As the series goes on, they hold a special item called Lovepat Pyoco Heart and using a Fluffy Card and Boing-Boing Card, which allow them to transform into Lovepyocorina.

Tsubasa Aiba (愛羽ツバサ, Aiba Tsubasa)
Played by: Miyu Watanabe
Tsubasa is a bright, energetic, love-filled girl who wants to protect love. Her mother is a famous novelist who is turned into a Love Zero. She transforms into Lovepat Pink (ラブパトピンク, Rabupato Pinku) and uses animal-themed attacks. Her catchphrase is, "Even if my love goes dark, my wings of love will go la-la-love!"

Sarai Shihara (紫原サライ, Shihara Sarai)
Played by: Rina Yamaguchi
Sarai is a returning character from Secret × Heroine Phantomirage!, who was transformed from an abandoned doll into a human girl. Having admired heroines for a long time, she loves sweets and is always bright and positive. She transforms into Lovepat Purple (ラブパトパープル, Rabupato Pāpuru) and uses sweets-themed attacks. Her catchphrase is, "At any time, it's us! We're completely in love!"

Kohana Aose (青瀬コハナ, Aose Kohana)
Played by: Yui Yamashita
Kohana is an honors student who is also talented at sports and loves gardening. She transforms into Lovepat Blue (ラブパトブルー, Rabupato Burū) and uses flower-themed attacks. Her catchphrase is, "No matter who, everyone is a beautiful flower! To blossom, love must be in full bloom!"

Sora Nanairo (七色ソラ, Nanairo Sora)
Played by: Yūra Sugiura
Sora is the Lovepatrinas' classmate who loves looking at the sky. After discovering their secret, she joins the Lovepatrinas' headquarters as mission control. She eventually becomes a Lovepatrina due to her desire to protect her friends. She holds a Lovepat Skyly to transforms into Lovepat Shine (ラブパトシャイン, Rabupato Shain) with rainbow-themed attacks. Her catchphrase is, "Love is, for certain, in your heart! Love is shining brightly!"

=== Secret Headquarters ===
Lovepyoco (ラブピョコ, Rabupyoko)

Voiced by: Saeko Kamijō
A bunny-like fairy who comes from a distant star called "Mimipyoco" and is searching for a love-filled person.

Director Loveji (ラブジー長官, Rabujī Chōkan)

Played by: Keiji Kuroki
At first glance, he is cool, and his heart is lovely. He founded and directs the Police × Heroine Lovepatrina to protect Earth's love from the Warupyoko Troupe.

Hayato Kenzaki (剣崎ハヤト, Kenzaki Hayato)

Played by: Iku Fujihara
The new chief at Lovepat's secret headquarters. He loves Love Pat and gets excited easily. He is also a senior at Tsubasa's school.

=== Warupyoco Troupe ===
Warupyoco (ワルピョコ)

Voiced by: Toshiyuki Toyonaga
The boss of the Warupyoko Troupe, who have come from the star "Mimipyoco." He wants to take the treasure called "Love" that humans have in their hearts to try and create his own Earth. He was childhood friends with Lovepyoco.

Warinne (ワリーヌ, Warīnu)

Played by: Yū Yashiro
A leader of the Warupyoko Troupe. She loves the indoors.

Pack (パック, Pakku)

Played by: BOB
The brain of the group. He packs people who are full of love and makes them Love Zeros.

Rincho (リンチョ)

Played by: Hosaki Tanaka
The powerhouse of the group. He takes away love.

=== Others ===
Yū Aiba (愛羽優, Aiba Yū)

Played by: Sayaka Isoyama
Tsubasa's mother, a novelist who wrote the series "The Great Detective Magure," which became a movie.

Satan (サーたん, Sa-tan)

A cute-faced demon who came out of the mysterious egg.

== Production ==
On Oha Suta, a "big announcement" on May 28, 2020, officially announced Police × Heroine Lovepatrina! for the first time. The show stars Miyu Watanabe, Rina Yamaguchi and Yui Yamashita. Lovepatrina was trademarked in February 2020. Yura Sugiura was later confirmed to be Lovepat Shine.

Prior to this season, Yamaguchi appeared in Phantomirage as Sarai, and producers later confirmed that her character will return in Lovepatrina as a main character. Watanabe also participated in LDH The Girls Audition in 2018. Yamashita was also a member of EXPG Lab. In addition to the main cast, the show's supporting cast includes Keiji Kuroki (EXILE), Iku Fujihara (EXPG Lab), Yuu Yashiro, BOB, Hosaki Tanaka and Sayaka Isoyama. Saeko Kamijou voices Lovepyoko with Phantomirage narrator, Toshiyuki Toyonaga voicing Warupyoko as well the narrator.

Episode 32, which aired on March 7, 2021, was a crossover episode arc with episode 51 of Tomica Kizuna Gattai Earth Granner. Lovepatrina features Earth Granner R and Earth Granner K, while Tomica Kizuna Gattai Earth Granner features a crossover episode with the Lovepatrina members appearing in animated format.

During the show's run, Watanabe, Yamaguchi, Yamashita and Sugiura performed as their characters at events and released music under the name Lovely² (stylized as lovely² and pronounced "lovely lovely"). Girls² sang the opening themes "Daiji na Mono" and "Girls Revolution" with Lovely² made a feature in the songs.

== Media ==
=== Episodes ===
Police × Heroine Lovepatrina! was broadcast weekly from July 26, 2020, on TV Tokyo at 9:00 am.

No.	Title	Directed by	Written by	Original release date
1	"Lovepatrina have been Dispatched!" "Rabupatoriina! Shutsudou Shimasu!" (ラブパトリーナ！出動します！)	Takashi Miike	Yoichi Kato	July 26, 2020
Tsubasa Aiba, a love-filled 1st grade middle school student, meets the cute and fluffy Lovepyoko one day and is suddenly nominated to become a Police x Heroine Lovepatrina! In order to save her mom whose love has been taken and turns into a Love Zero Kondate Onaji by the Warupyoko Troupe, she transforms into a Lovepatrina! Will she be able to bring her mom's love back!?
2	"I Absolutely Want to Become a Lovepat!" "Zettai Rabupato ni Naritai!" (ぜったいラブパトになりたい！)	Takashi Miike	Yoichi Kato	August 2, 2020
Everyone at Tsubasa's school is talking about the Lovepatrina. Meanwhile, Sarai, one of Tsubasa's classmates yells "I'll absolutely become a Lovepatrina!" on the rooftop. Sarai really wants to become a Lovepatrina, but what could she do... she has to be a Lovepatrina! When she was walking down the street, her favorite pastry baker becomes a Love Zero Sweets Kaeru. Sarai, who wants to save her, confronts the Love Zero.
3	"Let's Protect! The Love to Books" "Mamorou! Hon e no Rabu" (守ろう！本へのラ～ブ♡)	Takeshi Yokoi	Kana Matsui	August 9, 2020
Tsubasa sees her classmate Sora in the library. Sora is always in the library because she loves books. Her older brother who is the librarian, is turned into a Love Zero Moji wo Suitoru which endangers the books. But Sora can't do anything... Tsubasa and Sarai transform into Lovepatrinas and rush over. Can Sora's feelings change when she sees them fighting?
4	"In Full Bloom! Lovepat Blue!" "Sakihokore! Rabupato Buru!" (咲きほこれ！ラブパトブルー！)	Takeshi Yokoi	Yoichi Kato	August 16, 2020
Kohana Aose transfers to Tsubasa's class. Tsubasa and the others are fascinated by her as she's good at both studying and sports. While looking at the beloved flowers on the way home from school, the florist is turned into a Love Zero Ohana Haana. Tsubasa and Sarai rush to the scene where Kohana stands alone in front of the Love Zero! Does Kohana have a strong power of love too?
5	"Lovepyoko Became a Cookie!?" "Rabupyoko ga Kukkii ni Nacchatta! ?" (ラブピョコがクッキーになっちゃった!?)	Kenichiro Nishiumi	Kana Matsui	August 23, 2020
Tsubasa and Lovepyoko go to an Animal Park Petting Zoo. But, a person there is turned into a Love Zero! Lovepyoko is turned into a cookie by the Love Zero Doubutsu Kukkikkii but is also taken away! Can Tsubasa and the others safely rescue Lovepyoko from the Love Zero!?
6	"Who on Earth is our New Comrade!?" "Aratana Nakama wa Ittai Dare!?" (新たな仲間はいったい誰！？)	Kenichiro Nishiumi	Yoichi Kato	August 30, 2020
Lovepatrina's popularity is soaring so much that they have appeared in the magazine "Lovecchigumi". Meanwhile, Hayato, a senior at their school is seen reading the magazine enthusiastically. Tsubasa and the others feel a strong passion burning off of Hayato. Just then, the bookstore owner is turned into a Love Zero Lovepat Yaada! The Lovepat's rush to the bookstore to help out!
7	"The Detective is Love Arrested!" "Meitantei wo Rabu Taiho!" (名探偵をラブタイホ！)	Katsutoshi Hirano	Mao Aoki	September 6, 2020
Tsubasa's mom is a novelist. The deadline is near but she can't seem to make any progress... Tsubasa's and Lovepyoko were watching her when suddenly they're wrapped in a mysterious light and enter mom's novel! In that world, the novel's protagonist "The Great Detective Magure" is turned into a Love Zero Zenbu Usso! Will Tsubasa be able to return to the other world?
8	"Fear! Lovepat's Unknown World" "Kyoufu! Rabupato no Shiranai Sekai" (恐怖！ラブパトの知らない世界)	Hideyuki Yamamoto	Yuya Nakazono	September 13, 2020
Tsubasa invites everyone to a haunted house to cool off. Everyone is looking forward to it except Kohana who hates it. However, someone is turned into a Love Zero Asedaku Daaku at the haunted house!! Far from cooling off, can the Lovepat's bring back love while they sweat.
9	"Excited Passion! Hayato’s Hard Training!" "Gekiatsu! Hayato no Moutokkun" (激熱！ハヤトの猛特訓！)	Hideyuki Yamamoto	Yuya Nakazono	September 20, 2020
Today is the day Chief Hayato gives the Lovepat’s training. Tsubasa and Sarai have become completely exhausted, only Kohana heads to the park for training with Hayato. There, the policeman on patrol turns into a Love Zero Omawarii-san! However, the policeman seems to be someone Hayato knows. Kohana must transform alone to bring back love!
10	"The Girls Heroine's Fiery Bond!" "Gaaruzu Senshi no Atsui Kizuna!" (ガールズ戦士のアツい絆！)	Katsutoshi Hirano	Mao Aoki	September 27, 2020
Sarai goes to a dance event. The Phantomirage whom she admired, Kokomi, Saki, Yotsuba and Seira are to perform there. Sarai, who was looking forward to it, is with her friend who suddenly turns into a Love Zero Ongaku Keshisaaru. Sarai transforms into a Lovepatrina and confronts the Love Zero alone while Kokomi and the others watch.
11	"Find it! The New Lovepat Item!" "Sagashidase! Rabupato Shin Aitemu!" (探し出せ！ラブパト新アイテム！)	Ryusuke Kurahashi	Yoichi Kato	October 4, 2020
A new item was supposed to arrive from Mimipyoko! However, the rocket accidentally fell into a mountain. The Lovepat's go to the mountain to search for the rocket. But, the Warupyoko Troupe who were also looking for the new item, also came to the mountain! Will they be able to find it?
12	"Love Sparkles! It's Shining!" "Rabu Kirrarin! Kagayaiteimasu!" (ラブキッラリン！輝いています！)	Ryusuke Kurahashi	Yoichi Kato	October 11, 2020
Sora is caught by the Warupyoko Troupe whilst she was searching for the rocket carrying a new item that fell on the mountains. Trying to help Sora, Tsubasa, Sarai and Kohana fight the Love Zero Kura Kuraai however their mode change doesn’t work creating a struggle. From Sora, whose strong urges to help Tsubasa, a great power of love is born!?
13	"Dance with Everyone! Lallala Love!" "Minna de Odorou! Rarrara Rabu!" (みんなで踊ろう！ラッラララ～ブ！)	Takanobu Harashima	Kana Matsui	October 18, 2020
Tsubasa and the others go to see Flamenco which Lovepyoko says she likes. There, the girl dancing is turned into a Love Zero Karumende Katameen. Along with Sora, the four transform into Lovepatrina! The Lovepat's hold a singing and dancing competition in order to remind the girl of her love for dancing!
14	"Big Trouble with the Lovepat Boom!?" "Rabupato Buumu de Dai Pinchi!?" (ラブパトブームで大ピンチ！？)	Takeshi Yokoi	Yoichi Kato	October 25, 2020
What!? Lovepatrina will make a TV appearance! Excited and nervous, the Director at the studio is suddenly turned into a Love Zero Hengao Hiromeeru. They must transform in the middle of their live broadcast. But, if they transform, everyone will know their identity! What will the Lovepats do!?
15	"Lovepat! Lallala Recording♪" "Rabupato! Rarrara Rekodingu♪" (ラブパト！ラッララレコーディング♪)	Takeshi Yokoi	Mao Aoki	November 1, 2020
World famous music producer, Yasukatta Tanaka, contacts the secret headquarters. They ask if Lovepat Pink can sing a song they wrote. Tsubasa is very happy to make her debut as a singer, however, they turn into a Love Zero Sainou Naiyou. Can she turn him back with her new mode change!?
16	"Big Trouble! The Warupyoko Troupe go to School!?" "Dai Pinchi! Warupyoko Dan ga Gakkou ni!?" (大ピンチ！ワルピョコ団が学校に！？)	Kenichiro Nishiumi	Yuya Nakazono	November 8, 2020
The Warupyoko Troupe go to their school! Hayato who protected Sora after they try to take her love away is turned into a Love Zero Warupatrina. If nothing is done, the love at the school will be taken away. For Hayato who had helped her, she attempts to confront them alone!
17	"Lovepat Halloween Party!" "Rabupato Harowuin Paatii!" (ラブパト・ハロウィンパーティー！)	Kenichiro Nishiumi	Yuya Nakazono	November 15, 2020
The children fans of the Lovepat are trying to dress up as Lovepatrina for Halloween. Their mothers work hard at making their costumes. However one of their mothers is turned into a Love Zero Harouin Shinaitto. At this rate, the halloween that they were looking forward to will be ruined. Can the Lovepats bring this mother back and have a fun halloween!?
18	"The Biggest Enemy! The Birth of Satan!?" "Saidai no Teki! Satan Tanjou! ?" (最大の敵！サタン誕生！？)	Katsutoshi Hirano	Yoichi Kato	November 22, 2020
The mysterious egg that Warupyoko has been warming up finally cracks! Pack and Rincho go to a hot spring where a person there is turned into a Love Zero Atsuatsu Sugiiru. Tsubasa who happened to be playing in the area is dispatched alone to bring back their love. And, something is born from the egg!?
19	"Love's in Full Bloom♪ Kohana and her Grandmother" "Rabu Mankai♪Kohana to Obaachan" (ラブ満開♪コハナとおばあちゃん)	Katsutoshi Hirano	Mao Aoki	November 29, 2020
The evil that came out of the egg was not Satan but Sa-tan. Somehow the adorable Sa-tan gets along well with Tsubasa. However, she suddenly disappears. Meanwhile, Kohana and her grandmother goes to Kyushu to see a charismatic flower arrangement artist’s talk show. There, Mr. Sakuya the flower arrangement artist is turned into a Love Zero Hana yori Dangoppana. Kohana transforms by herself to confront him.
20	"Sarai and her Dad's Christmas♡" "Sarai to Papa no Kurisumasu♡" (サライとパパのクリスマス♡)	Takeshi Yokoi	Kana Matsui	December 6, 2020
Sarai's dad came to make a Christmas cake. There, the pastry chef is turned into a Love Zero Ichigo ni Naare. In response to Lovepat 110 call, Sarai is dispatched alone. She confronts the Love Zero using her new mode change, Curry Mode. Will she be able to deliver her mom's Christmas cake safely!?
21	"Satan Powers Up!?" "Satan, Pawaa Appu!?" (サーたん、パワーアップ！？)	Takanobu Harashima	Mao Aoki	December 13, 2020
Tsubasa was looking forward to the Christmas party with everyone and decides to search for gifts today. Then, she happens to meet Sa-tan and the two play together. As they enjoy visiting selfie spots, a member of a choir is turned into a Love Zero Kurushimimasu Song. Tsubasa and Sa-tan are dispatched!?
22	"Birth! Satan Claus!" "Tanjou! Satan Kurosu!" (誕生！サーたんクロース！)	Ryusuke Kurahashi	Yuya Nakazono	December 20, 2020
Satan who has been wearing a strange hat given by the Warupyoko Troupe is turned into her real form, Satan Claus. Not even knowing who Tsubasa is, she robs the love of Christmas one after the other. The Lovepat's are dispatched to return Satan back to normal. Is it even possible to turn her back to normal after becoming so evil!?
23	"Christmas' Lanlalalan! Lallalalove!" "Kurisumasu no Ranrararan! Rarrararabu!" (クリスマスのランララーン！ラッラララ～ブ！)	Ryusuke Kurahashi	Yuya Nakazono	December 27, 2020
The four Lovepat's are upset that they couldn't do a Love Arrest on Satan. Tsubasa, whose love was taken, is not in a good mood. But still, they are dispatched to restore Satan one more time. Even if their power doesn't work, will a Christmas miracle happen for the Lovepat's even if they have to face her many times!?
24	"Lovepat’s Merry New Year Christmas!?" "Rabupato no Akeomeri Kurisumasu" (ラブパトのあけおメリークリスマス！？)	Kenichiro Nishiumi	Kana Matsui	January 10, 2021
It's new year’s day and Tsubasa and the others are planning to have a Christmas party with Sa-tan. They ask the courier to dress up as Santa. However, the courier is turned into a Love Zero Santa Kuroushimasu which panics the city. Will they be able to turn him back and will it be possible to have a Christmas party with Sa-tan!?
25	"Dad’s Love Sparkles♪ It's Shining!" "Papa no Rabu, Kirrarin♪Kagayaiteimasu!" (パパのラブ、キッラリン♪輝いています！)	Hideyuki Yamamoto	Yuya Nakazono	January 17, 2021
Sora’s dad who was working abroad returns to Japan. Her dad was worried after learning that Sora has become a Lovepatrina. Sora’s family go to a memorable restaurant. There, the restaurant’s owner is turned into a Love Zero Omotenasu. Sora transforms and confronts it by herself. Will she be able to protect her mom, dad and everybody else!?
26	"Warupyoko's Surprising Strategy!" "Warupyoko Bikkuri Daisakusen!" (ワルピョコびっくり大作戦！)	Takanobu Harashima	Mao Aoki	January 24, 2021
Tsubasa is in high spirits after receiving the excellence award for writing. But at that time, a popular magician is turned into a Love Zero Taneaka Shitaru. The Lovepat's are dispatched but it's not like the usual, the Love Zero has powered up into the "Waruwaru Love Zero". Not only that, but it's producing a ton of Love Zero's one after the other. Will the Lovepat's be able to Love Arrest the Waruwaru Love Zero!?
27	"Find it! The Super Cute Legendary Power Up Item!" "Sagase! Densetsu no Chou Kawaii Pawaa Appu Aitemu!" (探せ！伝説の超かわいいパワーアップアイテム！)	Takanobu Harashima	Yuya Nakazono	January 31, 2021
According to Hayato’s information, there are super cute items that can power up the Lovepatrina. They think that if they can find it, they’ll be able to Love Arrest the Waruwaru Love Zero. Tsubasa and the others separate using different maps to find it. A comic story teller is turned into a Love Zero Warai Naashi while Sora is searching. She transforms and fights alone.
28	"The Legendary Power-Up Item!" "Densetsu no Pawaa Appu Aitemu!" (伝説のパワーアップアイテム！)	Takeshi Yokoi	Kana Matsui	February 7, 2021
Lovepyoko tries to give a special carrot to Tsubasa as a surprise gift because she’s upset that she can’t find the legendary item. However, Tsubasa does not like carrots! Shocked, Lovepyoko leaves. By herself, she is caught by a Love Zero but is found by the others but are in big trouble. Lovepyoko stands up against it to protect them but suddenly a miracle happens!?
29	"Transform! Lovepyokorina♪" "Henshin! Rabupyokorina♪" (変身！ラブピョコリーナ♪)	Takeshi Yokoi	Kana Matsui	February 14, 2021
Due to the passionate feelings of the girls and Lovepyoko, they were able to transform into Lovepyokorina. The lovepat’s confront the Waruwaru Love Zero in order to restore him back to normal. They fight using the new investigation cards “Fluffy Card” and the “Boing Boing Card” as Lovepyokorina. What will happen!?
30	"Hot Topic! Lovepyocorina!" "Wadai Futtou! Rabupyokorina!" (話題沸騰！ラブピョコリーナ！)	Hideyuki Yamamoto	Yuya Nakazono	February 21, 2021
The Lovepyocorina's activities have become a hot topic all over the world. A hair stylist was introduced on TV who has arranged the hair style of the Lovepyocorina. At that moment, the hair stylist is turned into a Waruwaru Love Zero Gacchirina. The Lovepat's are dispatched as Lovepyocorina to rescue the panicked beauty salon.
31	"Beloved Carrot Ice Cream" "Daisuki Ninjin Aisukuriimu" (大好きニンジンアイスクリーム)	Katsutoshi Hirano	Mao Aoki	February 28, 2021
Lovepyoco who was singing too much ends up falling asleep. Tsubasa and the others try to make carrot ice cream though it’s not found on earth to make her feel better. When they go to a cafe where they meet a pastry chef Sarai knows, he is turned into a Waruwaru Love Zero Ama-ama sugiiru. The Lovepat’s transform into Lovepyocorina to bring him back.
32	"Decision! Lovepat’s Popular Phrase Award" "Kettei! Rabupato Ryuukougo Taishou" (決定！ラブパト流行語大賞)	Kenichiro Nishiumi	Mao Aoki	March 7, 2021
Tsubasa and the others are preparing for a Lovepat program that will broadcast in Mimipyoco. The content to be delivered is the Lovepat Popular Phrase Award! They will announce what they think are the most popular phrases. As they announce these phrases, they remember when they became Lovepats.
33	"Sarai's Wings are in Big Trouble!?" "Sarai no Unigu Dai Pinchi!?" (サライのウイング大ピンチ！？)	Kenichiro Nishiumi	Kana Matsui	March 14, 2021
Sarai and Maika are in charge of class duties together. Maika is learning Japanese dance and invites Sarai to visit her. While practicing, the Warupyoco Dan appear and turn the dance teacher into a Love Zero Sensu damedame. In order to bring back the teacher who keeps repeating herself, she transforms alone!
34	"Love’s in Full Bloom! Kohana’s Mountain Climbing" "Rabu, Mankai! Kohana no Yamanobori" (ラブ、満開！コハナの山登り)	Takanobu Harashima	Yuya Nakazono	March 21, 2021
Kohana goes mountain climbing with Lovepyoco. She wanted to show Lovepyoco the beautiful flowers that are atop of the mountain. On the way, she makes friends with a camper and they have a meal together. They have fun mountain climbing but a great panic occurs when he is transformed into a Love Zero Yamahairasenu. Kohana must transform to bring him back!
35	"Sora’s Wish to the Stars" "Sora no Hoshi ni Negai wo" (ソラの星に願いを)	Ryusuke Kurahashi	Mao Aoki	March 28, 2021
Sora who is working hard as a library committee member becomes friends with Runa Amano who is in the class next to hers. Runa is very interested in stars and the universe however she is turned into a Love Zero Hoshi ni Negawanaimon by the Warupyoco Troupe. Runa who has turned into a Love Zero for some reason has shut herself in the classroom. Sora must transform alone and save her!
36	"Lovepyoco's Diet Declaration!" "Rabupyoko, Daietto Sengen!" (ラブピョコ、ダイエット宣言！)	Hideyuki Yamamoto	Kana Matsui	April 4, 2021
Due to eating a lot of snacks, Lovepyoco has gotten larger and perfectly round! And if left like this, they will not be able to transform into Lovepyocorina. Lovepyoco starts to desperately exercise. Tsubasa and the others cheer on Lovepyoco who is doing her best. With everyone’s support, Lovepyoco remembers the days they first met.
37	"Lovepyoco becomes Warupyoco!" "Rabupyoko, Warupyoko ni!" (ラブピョコ、ワルピョコに！)	Takanobu Harashima	Mao Aoki	April 11, 2021
Lovepyoco who worked hard at exercising becomes thirsty and drinks 120 Lovepyoco Drinks. However, when Lovepyoco drinks 120 drinks, she gains tremendous power. This time round, from the Lovepat Secret Headquarters, she finds herself at the Warupyoco Troupe’s hideout. There, she disguises herself as Warupyoco and manages to deceive them. Will Lovepyoco be able to return safely!?
38	"Lovepat VS WaruWaruPyoco Dan!" "Rabupato VS WaruWaruPyoco Dan!" (ラブパトVSワルワルピョコ団！)	Takeshi Yokoi	Kana Matsui	April 18, 2021
The Warupyoco Dan had found their love but Warupyoco turns them into Waruwaru Love Zero's Samupyoco Dan. Chaos begins to happen at a comedy audition venue, where the Lovepat's fight as Lovepyocorina. Can they bring back the Warupyoco Dan's love!?
39	"Warupyoco Powers Up! Lovepatrina are in Big Trouble!" "Warupyoko Pawa Appu! Rabupatorina Dai Pinchi!" (ワルピョコパワーアップ！ラブパトリーナ大ピンチ！)	Ryusuke Kurahashi	Yuya Nakazono	April 25, 2021
After eating the dark carrot, Warupyoco turns into Waruwaru Warupyoco. As well as this, he begins to take all the love away from the earth. The Lovepats hurriedly transform and confront him. The final battle with a powered-up Warupyoco begins. Will they really be able to protect the love of the earth!?
40	"The Decisive Battle! Waruwaru Warupyoco!" "Kessen! Waruwaru Warupyoko!" (決戦！ワルワルワルピョコ！)	Ryusuke Kurahashi	Yuya Nakazono	May 2, 2021
The Lovepatrina’s love has been taken and turned into Love Zero’s Love Zerorina by Warupyoco’s power. He is overjoyed as there is nobody left in his way. Lovepyoco calls out to Tsubasa, Sarai, Kohana and Sora to remind them of their love. Can they remember love and defeat Warupyoco!?
41	"Lovepat's Next Mission" "Rabupato, Tsugi Naru Ninmu" (ラブパト、次なる任務！？)	Kenichiro Nishiumi	Mao Aoki	May 9, 2021
The Lovepats were able to protect the love of the earth by love arresting Warupyoco. At the Lovepat Secret HQ, Director Loveji remembers when he first came to earth for the first time with Lovepyoco and meeting Tsubasa and her friends. And he tells the Lovepats that they have one more important mission to accomplish.
42	"Goodbye Lovepyoco!?" "Sayonara Rabupyoco!?" (さよならラブピョコ！？)	Ryusuke Kurahashi	Yuya Nakazono	May 16, 2021
Tsubasa and the others are praised by the great people at the Mimipyoco Star Headquarters. They were very happy and Lovepyoco’s success was recognized that she is sent to space for a new mission. Sarai, Kohana and Sora are upset and hate to see her leave and only Tsubasa supports Lovepyoco’s journey to space.
43	"A Great Girls Heroine Gathering!?" "Gaaruzu Senshi Dai Shuugou!?" (ガールズ戦士大集合！？)	Takanobu Harashima	Kana Matsui	May 23, 2021
Lovepyoco who woke up in the middle of the night goes to the Secret Headquarters by herself. There she sees all the Girls Heroine gathered. Lovepyoco explains to them all the activities the Lovepats have done so far. But what is the purpose of their arrival at the Secret Headquarters?
44	"Search for the Miraculous Treasure!" "Mirakuru na Otakara wo Sagase!" (ミラクルなお宝を探せ！)	Katsutoshi Hirano	Mao Aoki	May 30, 2021
The Lovepat's are looking for a super super treasure in regards to the history of the Girls Heroine. Sora begins to look for the treasure of very first Girls Heroine’s. She goes to a place related to the “Idol x Warrior Miracle Tunes” and there an audition is taking place where she is mistaken for a participant. What is Miracle Tunes’ treasure?
45	"Kohana Searches for the Treasure of Fully Bloomed Dreams!" "Kohana, Yume Mankai no Otakara Sagashi!" (コハナ、夢満開のお宝さがし！)	Hideyuki Yamamoto	Yuya Nakazono	June 6, 2021
The second super super treasure is from the “Magical x Heroine MagimajoPures” which is told to them by Director Loveji. Explaining that they are heroines who protect dreams, Tsubasa and the others go to a place where they think is full of dreams. Kohana remembers her childhood where she first realized her dreams. Suddenly, due to a mysterious power from Lovepyoco, she is warped to her grandmother’s house in Fukuoka. What is MagimajoPures’ treasure?
46	"Sarai’s Treasure is Fluttering!?" "Sarai no Otakara Fanfan Shiteru!?" (サライのお宝ファンファンしてる！？)	Ryusuke Kurahashi	Kana Matsui	June 13, 2021
The third super treasure is related to the “Secret x Heroine Phantomirage”. Sarai looks through all her memento’s with the Phantomi but there are so many she doesn’t know which one is the treasure. Meanwhile, her dad is cleaning the garage because it seems like her mom was angry that there were too many things. Sarai decides to help him and stumbles across something nostalgic… What is the Phantomirage’s treasure!?
47	"Discover the Treasure With a Love and a Pat!?" "Rabu de Papatto Otakara Hakken!?" (ラブでパパっとお宝発見！？)	Takeshi Yokoi	Mao Aoki	June 20, 2021
The last super treasure belongs to the Lovepatrina. Searching all over the Lovepat headquarters, but unable to find anything. Tsubasa goes to her home to search but still can’t find it. Just then, her mom brings her a novel. Inside, the story of how Tsubasa became a Lovepat is written. What is Lovepat’s treasure? And, what happens when all are together?
48	"Lovepatrina is Forever" "Rabupatorina wa Eien Ni" (ラブパトリーナは永遠に)	Ryusuke Kurahashi	Kana Matsui	June 27, 2021
The Lovepats have finally collected all of these super super treasures. Suddenly, a mysterious switch appears from the treasure. Everyone presses the switch but a serious call is made to the Lovepat Headquarters. It is said that Director Loveji is to return the Lovepat Star. Tsubasa and the others prepare a farewell party with gratitude for Director Loveji who has taken care of them so far.

== Soundtrack ==
Throughout Lovepatrina's run, a promotional idol girl group consisting of the main cast called Lovely^{2} (pronounced "lovely lovely") was created to perform theme songs. They were first announced as a trio on July 19, 2020, before officially debuting on September 30. Their fourth member, Sora (played by Yura Sugiura), joined the unit on October 11. They disbanded on June 30, 2021.

=== Singles ===
Title	Year	Peak chart positions		Sales	Album
Title	Year	JPN	JPN Hot	Sales	Album
"Maru Batsu Sankaku" (◯×△ 〜まる・ばつ・さんかく～)	2020	TBA	TBA	TBA	TBA
"Twirlin' Rintantan" (とぅわりんりんたんたん)	2020	TBA	TBA	TBA	TBA
Love^{2}	2021	TBA	TBA	TBA	TBA
"Yumemitai Tsutaetai" (夢みたい伝えたい)	2021	TBA	TBA	TBA	TBA
"—" denotes releases that did not chart or were not released in that region.

=== Film ===
On November 22, 2020, a theatrical film titled Police × Heroine Lovepatrina! The Movie: Challenge From A Phantom Thief! Let's Arrest With Love And A Pat! was announced. The film's theme song is "STARRRT!" by Girls² with Phantomirage and the remaining five members of the girl group to make a cameo appearance. The Love Diamond is distributed as a theater gift. The movie was originally scheduled to release on May 21, 2021.
