= Kamen Rider Ex-Aid Trilogy: Another Ending =

- Official poster release

Japanese name
- Kanji: 仮面ライダーエグゼイド トリロジー アナザー・エンディング
Transcriptions
- Revised Hepburn: Kamen Raidā Eguzeido Torirojī Anazā Endingu
- Directed by: Nobuhiro Suzumura
- Written by: Yuya Takahashi
- Starring: Toshiki Seto; Ukyo Matsumoto; Shouma Kai; Ruka Matsuda; Tetsuya Iwanaga; Hayato Onozuka
- Music by: ats-; Takehito Shimizu; Toru Watanabe
- Production companies: Toei Company; Toei Video; Toei Agency; Bandai; Nippon Columbia
- Distributed by: Toei Company
- Release dates: February 3, 2018 (Brave & Snipe); February 17, 2018 (Para-DX with Poppy); March 3, 2018 (Genm vs. Lazer)
- Country: Japan
- Language: Japanese

Kamen Rider Ex-Aid Trilogy: Another Ending (仮面ライダーエグゼイド トリロジー アナザー・エンディング, Kamen Raidā Eguzeido Torirojī Anazā Endingu) is a V-Cinema tokusatsu series of films part of the Kamen Rider Ex-Aid franchise. It was released for a limited time in Japanese theaters on February 3, 2018, with each subsequent chapter of the trilogy released in two-week intervals. Each of the films' subtitles contains the name of the focused characters.

Taking place two years after Kamen Rider Ex-Aid the Movie: True Ending, the movies portray several scenes and elements that were never told in the television series, as well as establishing Kuroto Dan/Kamen Rider Genm as the major antagonist/"Last Boss".

The first installment, Kamen Rider Brave & Snipe (仮面ライダーブレイブ&スナイプ, Kamen Raidā Bureibu Ando Sunaipu), focuses on the characters of Hiiro Kagami/Kamen Rider Brave and Taiga Hanaya/Kamen Rider Snipe and was released on February 3, 2017 on theaters and March 28 on DVD and Blu-Ray. The second installment, Kamen Rider Para-DX with Poppy (仮面ライダーパラドクスwithポッピー, Kamen Raidā Paradokusu Wizu Poppī), focusing on Parado/Kamen Rider Para-DX and Poppy Pipopapo/Kamen Rider Poppy, was released on February 17, 2018 on theaters and April 11, 2018 on DVD and Blu-ray. It also features the debut of Kamen Rider Another Para-DX, who is portrayed as a counterpart to Parado himself. The third and final installment, Kamen Rider Genm vs. Lazer (仮面ライダーゲンムVSレーザー, Kamen Raidā Genmu Bāsasu Rēzā) is the final installment that focused on Kuroto Dan/Kamen Rider Genm and Kiriya Kujo/Kamen Rider Lazer, was released on March 3, 2018 on theaters and April 25, 2018 on DVD and Blu-ray. It also features the debut of Kamen Rider Genm God Maximum Gamer Level Billion and Kamen Rider Lazer Level X.

== Plot ==
=== Kamen Rider Brave & Snipe ===
The supposedly disappeared Saki Momose re-emerged alongside Lovrica Bugster, who manipulated her. Luke Kidman, an American who gains interest in Nico Saiba developed symptoms of Lovrica's Game Disease. As both Brave and Snipe try to handle their situations, Kuroto Dan begins scheming from the shadows.

=== Kamen Rider Para-DX with Poppy ===
Saiko Yaotome is a doctor dedicated to recovery treatments and orchestrate "Let's make Bugsters", a new training game created for the recovery of people that disappeared. The test run has Emu raising Parado and Saiko raising Poppy. The real Parado has been trapped and he faces his mysterious double, with the strength of the bond with Emu.

=== Kamen Rider Genm vs. Lazer ===
Using the God Maximum Mighty X, Kuroto Dan caused the entire world to fall into Zombie Chronicle. Kiriya has found the key to face the power that not even Muteki can overcome and after receiving a certain message from Masamune, he faces Genm.

== Cast ==
Regular casts

- Kuroto Dan (檀 黎斗, Dan Kuroto): Tetsuya Iwanaga (岩永 徹也, Iwanaga Tetsuya)
- Kiriya Kujo (九条 貴利矢, Kujō Kiriya): Hayato Onozuka (小野塚 勇人, Onozuka Hayato)
- Emu Hojo (宝生 永夢, Hōjō Emu): Hiroki Iijima (飯島 寛騎, Iijima Hiroki)
- Asuna Karino (仮野 明日那, Karino Asuna): Ruka Matsuda (松田 るか, Matsuda Ruka)
- Saiko Yaotome (八乙女 紗衣子, Yaotome Saiko): Yurina Yanagi (柳 ゆり菜, Yanagi Yurina)
- Masamune Dan (檀 正宗, Dan Masamune): Hiroyuki Takami (貴水 博之, Takami Hiroyuki)

Kamen Rider Brave & Snipe

- Hiiro Kagami (鏡 飛彩, Kagami Hiiro): Toshiki Seto (瀬戸 利樹, Seto Toshiki)
- Taiga Hanaya (花家 大我, Hanaya Taiga): Ukyo Matsumoto (松本 享恭, Matsumoto Ukyō)
- Nico Saiba (西馬 ニコ, Saiba Niko): Reina Kurosaki (黒崎 レイナ, Kurosaki Reina)
- Saki Momose (百瀬 小姫, Momose Saki): Kana Nakagawa (中川 可菜, Nakagawa Kana)
- Cake shop clerk: Kurumi Miki (三木 くるみ, Miki Kurumi)
- Researcher: Daisuke Wachi (和知 大祐, Wachi Daisuke)
- Ren Amagasaki (天ヶ崎 恋, Amagasaki Ren): Shinya Kote (小手 伸也, Kote Shinya)
- Luke Kidman (ルーク・キッドマン, Rūku Kiddoman): Harry Sugiyama (ハリー杉山, Harī Sugiyama)
- Lovrica Bugster (ラヴリカバグスター, Ravurika Bagusutā; Voice): Junichi Suwabe (諏訪部 順一, Suwabe Jun'ichi)

Kamen Rider Para-DX with Poppy

- Parado (パラド), Black Parado (ブラックパラド, Burakku Parado): Shouma Kai (甲斐 翔真, Kai Shōma)
- Graphite (グラファイト, Gurafaito): Shouma Machii (町井 祥真, Machii Shōma)
- Sakurako Dan (檀 櫻子, Dan Sakurako): Rie Nakai (中井 理恵, Nakai Rie)
- Tsukuru Koboshi (小星 作, Koboshi Tsukuru): Shohei Uno (宇野 祥平, Uno Shōhei)

Kamen Rider Genm vs. Lazer

- Hiiro Kagami: Toshiki Seto
- Taiga Hanaya: Ukyo Matsumoto
- Parado: Shouma Kai
- Nico Saiba: Reina Kurosaki
- Miwa (ミワ): Miho Kaneno (金野 美穂, Kaneno Miho)
- Miwa's father: Akiyoshi Shibata (柴田 明良, Shibata Akiyoshi)
- Newscaster: Marin (麻鈴)
- Researcher: Daisuke Wachi

== Theme songs ==
- "Fellow Soldier"
  - Lyrics: Takayuki Tazawa
  - Composition: Keiichi Miyako
  - Arrangement: Rayflower
  - Artist: Rayflower
  The theme song of Kamen Rider Brave & Snipe.
- "Real Heart"
  - Lyrics: Mio Aoyama, Kyasu Morizuki
  - Composition: ats-
  - Arrangement: Toru Watanabe, Takehito Shimizu
  - Artist: Ruka Matsuda
  The theme song of Kamen Rider Para-DX with Poppy.
- "Believer"
  - Lyrics & Composition: BOUNCEBACK
  - Arrangement: Takehito Shimizu, Toru Watanabe
  - Artist: Hiroyuki Takami
  The theme song of Kamen Rider Genm vs. Lazer.
