= Ukyo Matsumoto =

Japanese actor

- 松本 享恭
- Born: December 27, 1994 (age 31); Fukuoka Prefecture, Japan
- Occupation: Actor
- Years active: 2014–present
- Agent: G-Star.Pro
- Height: 182 cm (6 ft 0 in)

Ukyo Matsumoto (松本 享恭, Matsumoto Ukyō; born 27 December 1994, in Fukuoka Prefecture, Japan) is a Japanese actor.

== Biography ==
Matsumoto was chosen as one of Top Coat's 20th Anniversary Audition artists on 2014.

His acting debut was in the tokusatsu series Ultraman X on 2015.

On 2016, Matsumoto appeared in another tokusatsu series Kamen Rider Ex-Aid as Taiga Hanaya/Kamen Rider Snipe.

== Filmography ==
=== TV series ===
| Year | Title | Role | Network | Ref. |
|---|---|---|---|---|
| 2015 | Ultraman X | Hayato Kijima | TV Tokyo | |
| 2016-17 | Kamen Rider Ex-Aid | Taiga Hanaya/Kamen Rider Snipe | TV Asahi | |
| 2017 | We're Millennials Got a Problem? SP | Student | Nippon TV | |
| 2018 | The Werewolf Game: Lost Eden | Kazuki Mizutani | Television Kanagawa | |
| 2018 | Love Stories from Fukuoka 13 | Takuya Ikeda | Kyushu Asahi Broadcasting | |
| 2018 | The Story of Shotaro Ishinomori, the Man Who Created a Hero | Yabe | Nippon TV | |
| 2018 | Choosing Spouse By Lottery | Yūsuke Kitakaze | Tōkai Television Broadcasting | |
| 2018 | AIBOU: Tokyo Detective Duo | Noriyuki Nakasako | TV Asahi | |
| 2019 | Insect Cage's Lock | Saotome | Wowow | |
| 2021-22 | Bittomo × Heroine Kirameki Powers! | Mr. Shiny | TV Tokyo | |

=== Films ===
| Year | Title | Role | Ref |
|---|---|---|---|
| 2016 | Ultraman X The Movie | Hayato Kijima | |
| 2016 | Kamen Rider Heisei Generations: Dr. Pac-Man vs. Ex-Aid & Ghost with Legend Rider | Taiga Hanaya/Kamen Rider Snipe | |
| 2017 | Kamen Rider × Super Sentai: Ultra Super Hero Taisen | Taiga Hanaya/Kamen Rider Snipe | |
| 2017 | Kamen Rider Ex-Aid the Movie: True Ending | Taiga Hanaya/Kamen Rider Snipe | |
| 2017 | Kamen Rider Heisei Generations Final: Build & Ex-Aid with Legend Rider | Taiga Hanaya/Kamen Rider Snipe | |
| 2018 | Yamikin Gurentai | Shōji Mikoshiba | |
| 2018 | The Werewolf Game: Inferno | Kazuki Mizutani | |
| 2018 | My Dad is a Heel Wrestler | Shōhei Machida | |
| 2021 | Kawa no Nagare ni | | |

=== Web series ===
| Year | Title | Role | Network |
|---|---|---|---|
| 2017 | Kamen Sentai Gorider | Kamen Rider Snipe (voice) | Video Pass |
| 2017 | Impossibility Defense | Shinpei Arakawa | dTV |

=== Original video series ===
| Year | Title | Role |
|---|---|---|
| 2017 | Kamen Rider Snipe: Episode Zero | Taiga Hanaya/Kamen Rider Snipe |
| 2018 | Kamen Rider Ex-Aid Trilogy: Another Ending | Taiga Hanaya/Kamen Rider Snipe/Kamen Rider Cronus |

=== Stage ===
| Year | Title | Role |
|---|---|---|
| 2015 | Bushi Byakko Mononofu Shiroki Tora: Bakumatsu, "Makoto" ni Akogare, Byakko to Yobareta Wakamono-tachi | Wasuke Ishida |
| 2016 | Kuroko's Basketball | Rinnosuke Mitobe |
| 2016 | Venice ni Shisu | |
| 2018 | Warau Kyotō | |
