= Crash! (manga) =

Japanese television series

- Cover of the Japanese version of vol. 1, first released on October 15, 2007
- Genre: Romance
- Manga
- Written by: Yuka Fujiwara
- Published by: Shueisha
- English publisher: Shueisha (digital)
- Imprint: Ribon Mascot Comics
- Magazine: Ribon
- Original run: April 2, 2007 – July 3, 2013
- Volumes: 16
- Light novel
- Written by: Aki Hirose
- Illustrated by: Yuka Fujiwara
- Published by: Shueisha
- Imprint: Shueisha Mirai Bunko
- Original run: November 14, 2011 – November 5, 2012
- Volumes: 4
- Anime television series
- Original network: TV Tokyo
- Original run: November 13, 2012 – November 27, 2012
- Episodes: 3

Crash! (Japanese: クラッシュ!, Hepburn: Kurasshu!; stylized as CRASH!) is a Japanese manga series by Yuka Fujiwara. Crash! was serialized in the monthly shōjo manga magazine Ribon from the May 2007 issue to the December 2009 issue. A second part was serialized from the April 2010 issue to August 2013 issue in Ribon under the subtitle Brand New Happy Wave. During the series' run, two vomics (voice comics) were released, and an anime adaptation was featured on the children's variety show Oha Suta.

== Plot ==
=== Act 1 ===
Hana Shiraboshi, a high school student whose mother is the CEO of the White Star Talent Agency, is assigned to produce an idol group for the agency's 10th anniversary. Hana's nosebleed occurs whenever her she sees potential in others, and she uses it to scout five boys: Kiri Kurose, Rei Shinozuka, Junpei Akamatsu, Kazuhiko Midorikawa, and Yugo Aoyagi. Together, the five debut as the boy band Crash, with Hana as their manager. To reach their goal of becoming the top idol group, with the help of Hana, Crash gains experience through singing, acting, and dancing.

=== Act 2: Brand New Happy Wave ===
Two years later, Crash has become a successful group. Yui Sakura, Kazuhiko's childhood friend, becomes Hana's assistant in managing the group at White Star on his recommendation. As Yui helps Crash with their entertainment activities, she falls in love with Rei. Meanwhile, Kazuhiko reveals to Yui that he has been in love with her since childhood.

== Characters ==
=== Protagonists ===
Hana Shiraboshi (白星 花, Shiraboshi Hana)
Voiced by: Mai Nakahara (vomic 1), Aya Uchida (vomic 2), uncredited (anime)
Hana is a business-oriented high school student whose family runs the White Star Talent Agency. Whenever she sees potential in her talents, she gets a nosebleed.
Yui Sakura (茶倉 由衣, Sakura Yui)
Voiced by: Kumiko Watanabe (vomic 2), Chinatsu Akasaki (anime)
Yui is the protagonist of the Act 2. She is a clumsy but good-hearted high school student and used to attend the same dance as Kazuhiko. On his recommendation, she begins working as Hana's assistant. She falls in love with Rei but also starts finding herself attracted to Kazuhiko when he confesses to her.

=== Crash ===
Kiri Kurose (黒瀬 桐, Kurose Kiri)
Voiced by: Kishō Taniyama (vomic 1), Masanori Kobayashi (vomic 2), Tatsuhisa Suzuki (anime)
Kiri is a student from Hana's high school. He is brash and arrogant, but he is also charismatic and plays the guitar. He decides to join White Star to pay off his father's debt. Throughout the series, he falls in love with Hana, but she remains oblivious.
Rei Shinozuka (紫ノ塚 怜, Shinozuka Rei)
Voiced by: Kazutaka Ishii (vomic 1), Yukari Shimotsuki (vomic 2), Shinnosuke Tachibana (anime)
Rei is a quiet first-year high school student whose father is a world-famous magician. He is level-headed, observant, and calm, which causes him to clash with Kiri. Throughout the series, he falls in love with Hana, but she remains oblivious.
Junpei Akamatsu (赤松 順平, Akamatsu Junpei)
Voiced by: Atsushi Abe (vomic 1), Kazuki Watanabe (vomic 2), Tetsuya Kakihara (anime)
Junpei is the leader of Crash and specializes in street dance. He acts as an older brother figure to everyone and later dates Marika, another idol from their agency.
Kazuhiko Midorikawa (緑川一彦, Midorikawa Kazuhiko)
Voiced by: Motoki Takagi (vomic 1), Yūko Saitō (vomic 2), Kōki Uchiyama (anime)
Kazuhiko is the youngest of the group and a middle school student at the start of the story. He is a longtime friend of Junpei's and comes from a family specializing in traditional Japanese dance. He is in love with Yui.
Yugo Aoyagi (青柳 侑吾, Aoyagi Yūgo)
Voiced by: Hitoshi Yanai (vomic 1), Yūya Nakamura (vomic 2), Junichi Yanagita (anime)
Yugo is a third-year in high school and the oldest in Crash. He is flirtatious around women.

== Media ==
=== Manga ===
Crash! is written and illustrated by Yuka Fujiwara. It was serialized in the monthly magazine Ribon from the May 2007 issue to the December 2009 issue. Fujiwara created the series due to the growing popularity of idols in media, and she had based all members of Crash on characters from her previous works.

As the original story arc of Crash! was concluding, Fujiwara was asked to continue the story with a new main character as the focus. After consideration, Fujiwara published a second act in Ribon from the April 2010 issue to August 2013 released on July 3, 2013. The second act, published as Act 2: Brand New Happy Wave in the bound volumes beginning with volume 8, introduced Yui Sakura as the new main character. The chapters were later released in 16 bound volumes by Shueisha under the Ribon Mascot Comics imprint.

During the series' run, a vomic (voice comic) was released on Shueisha's website in 2009, which adapted the first chapter. A media mix project was announced on October 2, 2010, through the November 2010 issue of Ribon, consisting of a second vomic billed as a special version and a song produced exclusively for the series. The special edition vomic released in 2011 with a new voice cast and original story. It was also later released as a magazine gift on DVD with the June 2012 issue of Ribon on May 1, 2012. The song was announced on November 2, 2010, through the December 2010 issue. Titled "Crash on You", the song was produced by Elements Garden with lyrics by Fujiwara, featuring the new voice cast. The lyrics to the full version of the song were available as an online preorder bonus of volume 10 of the manga.

Shueisha began publishing the manga in English on its Manga Million digital platform in 2026.

No.	Japanese release date	Japanese ISBN
1	October 15, 2007	978-4-08-856779-2
2	February 15, 2008	978-4-08-856802-7
3	July 15, 2008	978-4-08-856826-3
4	December 15, 2008	978-4-08-856859-1
5	May 15, 2009	978-4-08-856886-7
6	October 15, 2009	978-4-08-867013-3
7	March 15, 2010	978-4-08-867041-6
8	August 15, 2010	978-4-08-867068-3
9	February 15, 2011	978-4-08-867097-3
10	June 15, 2011	978-4-08-867123-9
11	November 15, 2011	978-4-08-867152-9
12	March 15, 2012	978-4-08-867183-3
13	July 13, 2012	978-4-08-867208-3
14	December 14, 2012	978-4-08-867237-3
15	May 15, 2013	978-4-08-867267-0
16	February 14, 2014	978-4-08-867310-3

=== Light novels ===
A light novel adaptation of the first part was written by Aki Hirose and published by Shueisha under the Shueisha Mirai Bunko imprint, with illustrations provided by Fujiwara.

No.	Title	Japanese release date	Japanese ISBN
1	lit. Crash! 1: The Nosebleed of Fate; Crash! 1: Unmei no Hanaji (CRASH! 1 運命の鼻血)	November 14, 2011	978-4-08-321051-8
2	lit. Crash! 2: An Impacting Debut!! Crash! 2: Shōgeki no Debyū (CRASH! 2 衝撃のデビュー!!)	March 5, 2012	978-4-08-321075-4
3	lit. Crash! 3: The Stairway to Being a Top Idol; Crash! 3: Toppu Aidoru e no Kaidan (CRASH! 3 トップアイドルへの階段)	September 5, 2012	978-4-08-321113-3
4	lit. Crash! 4: Deepening Bonds; Crash! 4: Fukamaru Kizuna (CRASH! 4 深まるきずな)	November 5, 2012	978-4-08-321124-9

=== Anime ===
In 2012, an anime adaptation aired as short animated segments on the children's variety show Oha Suta, which was broadcast on TV Tokyo. The theme song is "Kimi to Eien ni Onaji Yume o Miru" (君と永遠に同じ夢を見る; lit. "I'll Have the Same Dream as You Forever") and is performed by Iori Nomizu.

No.	Title	Directed by	Written by	Original release date
1	"Episode 1"; Transliteration: "Dai Ikkai" (Japanese: 第1回)	Unknown	Unknown	November 13, 2012
Yui Sakura becomes part of the school festival committee and is tricked into asking Kazuhiko Midorikawa, her upperclassmen and childhood friend, to have Crash perform at their school. Yui meets the members of Crash and Hana Shiraboshi, and after the show is a success, she is invited to be Hana's assistant.
2	"Episode 2"; Transliteration: "Dai Ni-kai" (Japanese: 第2回)	Unknown	Unknown	November 20, 2012
Yui begins her new part-time job as an assistant manager, and she helps Hana take photos of the members of Crash as they wake up to offer as fan club goods. Kiri Kurose, who is already awake, urges the others to stay motivated, and this encourages everyone. Sensing their determination, Yui becomes inspired to work harder.
3	"Episode 3"; Transliteration: "Dai San-kai" (Japanese: 第3回)	Unknown	Unknown	November 27, 2012
After Kazuhiko confesses to Yui, Yugo helps her organize her thoughts. Yui becomes encouraged to tell Kazuhiko how she feels, and she does so during their outing at an amusement park. Afterwards, they begin dating.

== Reception ==
Volume 8 debuted at #28 on Oricon and sold 19,950 copies in its first week. Volume 9 debuted at #30 on Oricon and sold 23,415 copies in its first week. Volume 15 debuted at #46 on Oricon and sold 23,246 copies in its first week. Volume 16 debuted at #44 on Oricon and sold 14,693 copies in its first week.
