= Kamen Rider Ex-Aid =

- Genre: Tokusatsu; Superhero fiction Science fiction Action; Medical drama Cyberpunk; Comedy drama
- Created by: Shotaro Ishinomori
- Screenplay by: Yuya Takahashi
- Directed by: Shojiro Nakazawa; Koichi Sakamoto; Kyohei Yamaguchi; Satoshi Morota; Kazuya Kamihoriuchi; Naoki Tamura
- Starring: Hiroki Iijima; Toshiki Seto; Ukyo Matsumoto; Tetsuya Iwanaga; Ruka Matsuda; Hayato Onozuka; Shouma Kai; Shouma Machii; Reina Kurosaki; Hiroyuki Takami; Hanamaru Hakata; Hironobu Nomura
- Narrated by: Junichi Suwabe
- Opening theme: "EXCITE" by Daichi Miura
- Composers: Kanata Okajima; Takehito Shimizu; Toru Watanabe
- Country of origin: Japan
- Original language: Japanese
- No. of episodes: 45 (list of episodes)

Production
- Executive producer: Motoi Sasaki (TV Asahi)
- Producers: Ayumi Kanno (TV Asahi); Takahito Ōmori (Toei)
- Running time: 20–25 minutes
- Production companies: TV Asahi; Toei Company; Asatsu-DK

Original release
- Network: ANN (TV Asahi)
- Release: October 2, 2016 – August 27, 2017

Related
- Kamen Rider Ghost; Kamen Rider Build

Kamen Rider Ex-Aid (仮面ライダーエグゼイド, Kamen Raidā Eguzeido) is a Japanese tokusatsu drama in Toei Company's Kamen Rider Series. It is the 18th series in the Heisei period run, the 27th series overall, and a commemoration of the 45th anniversary of the franchise. Toei registered the Kamen Rider Ex-Aid trademark on June 13, 2016. The show premiered on October 2, 2016, one week after Kamen Rider Ghost's finale, joining Doubutsu Sentai Zyuohger and later, Uchu Sentai Kyuranger in the Super Hero Time line-up. It's the first Kamen Rider series with a video game motif.

== Story ==
Emu Hojo is an intern in the Pediatrics Department at Seito University Hospital and a genius video gamer who goes by the alias "M". Emu was inspired to practice medicine after a doctor, the future minister of health Kyotaro Hinata saved his life from an illness when he was a child. Kyotaro also gave him a WonderSwan handheld video game console as a reward that ignited Emu's interest in video games. Recently, a video game company known as the Genm Corporation, or Genm Corp. for short has become aware of the existence of the Bugsters, a form of computer virus that spawns from their company's software bugs. Led by the mysterious Parado and his partner Graphite, the Bugsters manifest themselves in the physical world by infecting humans that play Genm Corp's video games at a cellular level. Once a Bugster fully manifests, the human host gradually fades away as a consequence of stress experienced by the host.

Genm Corp counters the Bugster threat by developing the Gamer Driver belts and a series of transformation and summon type trinkets, the Rider Gashats, for doctors who underwent a special procedure to be allowed to use its powers. One of the chosen doctors is Emu himself, who transforms into Kamen Rider Ex-Aid to save his patients from the Bugster viruses. But Ex-Aid learns of other doctors who are also Riders besides himself: elite surgeon Hiiro Kagami/Kamen Rider Brave, the unlicensed "dark doctor" Taiga Hanaya/Kamen Rider Snipe, and coroner Kiriya Kujo/Kamen Rider Lazer, who can transform into a motorcycle form. Assisted by Poppy Pipopapo, a Bugster who joined their side under the name Asuna Karino, the four also face the opposition of the prototype Ex-Aid Kamen Rider Genm, eventually revealed to be Genm Corp's CEO Kuroto Dan. Revealing himself to be the creator of the Bugsters after deleting Kiriya, Kuroto has been using them and the Doctor Riders to create "The Ultimate Game", an AR MMO called "Kamen Rider Chronicle", where everyone is given the power to become a Kamen Rider known as a Ride-Player in a fight for survival. Kuroto reveals that he infected Emu with the Bugster virus years ago, making him patient zero of the current Bugster infection. The group is then joined by Nico Saiba, Emu's gaming rival known as "N" who becomes Taiga's assistant.

Once being defeated for good by Emu, Kuroto is killed off by Parado who gained the ability to become Kamen Rider Para-DX as he completes Kamen Rider Chronicle with a revived Graphite and a briefly reprogramed Poppy, who becomes a Kamen Rider herself while Nico becomes a Ride-Player. Parado explains his intention to wipe out the human race with the game, revealing himself as Emu's Bugster counterpart while Poppy convinces a revived Kuroto to join the CR after reminding him of his mother whom she manifested from. Not long after, a new threat to both the Riders and Bugsters appeared in the form of the powerful Kamen Rider Cronus, revealed to be Kuroto's father Masamune Dan who is both the true mastermind of the first Zero Day and the "other" patient zero. Revealing his true colors once Kamen Rider Chronicle is completed, Masamune uses the game to further his plan, such as mass-producing Kamen Rider Chronicle Gashats worldwide. Later on, Kiriya is revived as Kamen Rider Lazer Turbo. In the final story arc, the Riders learn that the only way to stop Kamen Rider Chronicle is by destroying the Bugster who serves as its final boss: Gamedeus. When the Riders developed a means to defeat Gamedeus, Cronus retaliates by absorbing the Bugster and transforms into the new final boss Kamen Rider Gamedeus Cronus.

== Casting and production ==
The Kamen Rider Ex-Aid trademark was registered by Toei on June 1, 2016.

The show features Lupin the Third Part 4 chief script writer Yuya Takahashi serving as chief script writer on a Kamen Rider series for the first time. TV Asahi producer Motoi Sasaki, who has produced various Kamen Rider shows as co-producer with a Toei producer in the past serves as chief producer for the first time. Takahito Ōmori, chief producer on Zyuden Sentai Kyoryuger and Kamen Rider Drive also produced it. The story and cast of this series was unveiled on at Press Conference on August 30, 2016.

== Episodes ==
Given the show's video-game theme, each episode's title is written part in English, part in kanji, similar to that of most Japanese video game covers.

No.	Title	Directed by	Original release date
1	"I'm a Kamen Rider!"; Transliteration: "Aimu A Kamen Raidā!" (Japanese: I'm a 仮面ライダー！)	Shojiro Nakazawa	October 2, 2016
2	"Another Prodigy With No Thank You?"; Transliteration: "Tensai Futari wa Nō Sankyū?" (Japanese: 天才二人は no thank you？)	Shojiro Nakazawa	October 9, 2016
3	"The Man Who Arrives With a Bang!"; Transliteration: "Ban Shita Aitsu ga Yattekuru!" (Japanese: BANしたあいつがやって来る！)	Koichi Sakamoto	October 16, 2016
4	"The Name of the Operation Is Dash!"; Transliteration: "Operēshon no Na wa Dasshu!" (Japanese: オペレーションの名はDash！)	Koichi Sakamoto	October 23, 2016
5	"Everyone Is Here to Clash and Crash!"; Transliteration: "Zen'in Shūketsu, Gekitotsu Kurasshu!" (Japanese: 全員集結、激突Crash！)	Kyohei Yamaguchi	October 30, 2016
6	"The Pulse Is Pounding in the Heart!"; Transliteration: "Kodō o Kizame In Za Hāto!" (Japanese: 鼓動を刻め in the heart!)	Kyohei Yamaguchi	November 13, 2016
7	"The Essence of Some Lie!"; Transliteration: "Samu Rai no Gokui!" (Japanese: Some lieの極意！)	Shojiro Nakazawa	November 20, 2016
8	"Fly High, Gentlemen!"; Transliteration: "Otoko-tachi yo, Furai Hai!" (Japanese: 男たちよ、Fly high！)	Shojiro Nakazawa	November 27, 2016
9	"Slay the Dragon!"; Transliteration: "Doragon o Buttobase!" (Japanese: Dragonをぶっとばせ！)	Satoshi Morota	December 4, 2016
10	"An Odd Party of Doctors!"; Transliteration: "Fuzoroi no Dokutāzu!" (Japanese: ふぞろいのDoctors！)	Satoshi Morota	December 11, 2016
11	"Who's the Kamen Rider in Black?"; Transliteration: "Fūzu Kuroi Kamen Raidā?" (Japanese: Who's 黒い仮面ライダー？)	Kyohei Yamaguchi	December 18, 2016
12	"Christmas Special: The Targeted Silver Xmas!"; Transliteration: "Kurisumasu Tokubetsuhen Nerawareta Hakugin no Kurisumasu!" (Japanese: クリスマス特別編 狙われた白銀のXmas！)	Kyohei Yamaguchi	December 25, 2016
13	"A Predetermined Destiny"; Transliteration: "Sadamerareta Desutinī" (Japanese: 定められたDestiny)	Shojiro Nakazawa	January 8, 2017
14	"We're Kamen Riders!"; Transliteration: "Wīā Kamen Raidā!" (Japanese: We're 仮面ライダー！)	Shojiro Nakazawa	January 15, 2017
15	"A New Challenger Appears!"; Transliteration: "Arata na Charenjā Arawaru!" (Japanese: 新たなchallenger現る！)	Satoshi Morota	January 22, 2017
16	"The Paradox of Defeating M"; Transliteration: "Datō Emu no Paradokkusu" (Japanese: 打倒MのParadox)	Satoshi Morota	January 29, 2017
17	"A Nonstandard Burgster?"; Transliteration: "Kikaku-gai no Bāgusutā?" (Japanese: 規格外のBURGSTER?)	Kyohei Yamaguchi	February 5, 2017
18	"The Revealed Truth!"; Transliteration: "Abakareshi Turūsu!" (Japanese: 暴かれしtruth！)	Kyohei Yamaguchi	February 12, 2017
19	"A Sudden Fantasy!?"; Transliteration: "Fantajī wa Totsuzen ni!?" (Japanese: Fantasyは突然に!?)	Shojiro Nakazawa	February 19, 2017
20	"Take Off Against the Wind!"; Transliteration: "Gyakufū kara no Teiku Ofu!" (Japanese: 逆風からのtake off！)	Shojiro Nakazawa	February 26, 2017
21	"Pursue the Mystery!"; Transliteration: "Misuterī o Tsuiseki seyo!" (Japanese: mysteryを追跡せよ！)	Satoshi Morota	March 5, 2017
22	"The Conspired History!"; Transliteration: "Shikumareta Hisutorī!" (Japanese: 仕組まれたhistory！)	Satoshi Morota	March 12, 2017
23	"Extreme Dead or Alive!"; Transliteration: "Kyokugen no Deddo oa Araibu!" (Japanese: 極限のdead or alive！)	Kyohei Yamaguchi	March 19, 2017
24	"Embracing Ambitions, Go Together!"; Transliteration: "Taishi o Idaite Gō Tugezā!" (Japanese: 大志を抱いてgo together！)	Kyohei Yamaguchi	March 26, 2017
25	"A New Game Starts!"; Transliteration: "Nyū Gēmu Kidō!" (Japanese: New game起動！)	Shojiro Nakazawa	April 2, 2017
26	"Players Who Bet on Survival"; Transliteration: "Seizon o Kaketa Pureiyāzu" (Japanese: 生存を賭けたplayers)	Shojiro Nakazawa	April 9, 2017
27	"Love & Peace for the Winner!"; Transliteration: "Shōsha ni Sasagu Rabu Ando Pīsu!" (Japanese: 勝者に捧ぐlove＆peace！)	Satoshi Morota	April 16, 2017
28	"Beyond the Identity"; Transliteration: "Aidentiti o Koete" (Japanese: Identityを超えて)	Satoshi Morota	April 23, 2017
29	"We're Me!?"; Transliteration: "Wīā Ore!?" (Japanese: We're 俺!?)	Kyohei Yamaguchi	April 30, 2017
30	"Strongest vs. Strongest!"; Transliteration: "Saikyō Bāsasu Saikyō!" (Japanese: 最強VS最強！)	Kyohei Yamaguchi	May 7, 2017
31	"The Forbidden Continue!?"; Transliteration: "Kindan no Kontinyū!?" (Japanese: 禁断のContinue!?)	Kazuya Kamihoriuchi	May 14, 2017
32	"Judgement Passed!"; Transliteration: "Kudasareta Jajjimento!" (Japanese: 下されたJudgement！)	Kazuya Kamihoriuchi	May 21, 2017
33	"Company Restructuring!"; Transliteration: "Kanpanī Saihen!" (Japanese: Company再編！)	Naoki Tamura	May 28, 2017
34	"Accomplished Rebirth!"; Transliteration: "Hatasareshi Ribāsu!" (Japanese: 果たされしrebirth！)	Naoki Tamura	June 4, 2017
35	"Rescue the Partner!"; Transliteration: "Pātonā o Kyūshutsu seyo!" (Japanese: Partnerを救出せよ！)	Kyohei Yamaguchi	June 11, 2017
36	"Perfect Invincible Gamer!"; Transliteration: "Kanzen Muteki no Gēmā!" (Japanese: 完全無敵のGAMER！)	Kyohei Yamaguchi	June 25, 2017
37	"Resolution of the White Knight!"; Transliteration: "Howaito Naito no Kakugo!" (Japanese: White knightの覚悟！)	Satoshi Morota	July 2, 2017
38	"Period With Tears"; Transliteration: "Namida no Piriodo" (Japanese: 涙のperiod)	Satoshi Morota	July 9, 2017
39	"Goodbye Me!"; Transliteration: "Gubbai Ore!" (Japanese: Goodbye俺！)	Kazuya Kamihoriuchi	July 16, 2017
40	"Reboot of Fate!"; Transliteration: "Unmei no Ribūto!" (Japanese: 運命のreboot！)	Kazuya Kamihoriuchi	July 23, 2017
41	"Reset Game!"; Transliteration: "Risetto Sareta Gēmu!" (Japanese: Resetされたゲーム!)	Kyohei Yamaguchi	July 30, 2017
42	"God Arrives!"; Transliteration: "Goddo Kōrin!" (Japanese: God降臨!)	Kyohei Yamaguchi	August 6, 2017
43	"White Coat License"; Transliteration: "Hakui no Raisensu" (Japanese: 白衣のlicense)	Shojiro Nakazawa	August 13, 2017
44	"The Last Smile"; Transliteration: "Saigo no Sumairu" (Japanese: 最期のsmile)	Shojiro Nakazawa	August 20, 2017
45 (Finale)	"Endless Game"; Transliteration: "Owarinaki Gēmu" (Japanese: 終わりなきGAME)	Shojiro Nakazawa	August 27, 2017

== Films ==
Kamen Rider Ex-Aid made his first appearance as a cameo in the film Kamen Rider Ghost: The 100 Eyecons and Ghost's Fated Moment.

=== Kamen Rider Heisei Generations ===
A Movie War film, titled Kamen Rider Heisei Generations: Dr. Pac-Man vs. Ex-Aid & Ghost with Legend Rider (仮面ライダー平成ジェネレーションズ Dr.パックマン対エグゼイド&ゴーストwithレジェンドライダー, Kamen Raidā Heisei Jenerēshonzu Dokutā Pakkuman Tai Eguzeido Ando Gōsuto Wizu Rejendo Raidā), was released in Japan on December 10, 2016. The film features Kamen Rider Ex-Aid teaming up with Kamen Rider Ghost, Kamen Rider Drive, Kamen Rider Gaim, and Kamen Rider Wizard as they battle a virus based on Bandai Namco Entertainment's video game character, Pac-Man. The professional wrestler Hiroshi Tanahashi was announced to be one of the main antagonists of the movie. In addition, Shunya Shiraishi (Kamen Rider Wizard) and Ryoma Takeuchi (Kamen Rider Drive) reprised their roles in the film respectively. The events of the movie take place between Episodes 10 and 11.

=== Ultra Super Hero Taisen ===
A crossover film, titled Kamen Rider × Super Sentai: Ultra Super Hero Taisen (仮面ライダー×スーパー戦隊 超スーパーヒーロー大戦, Kamen Raidā × Supā Sentai Chō Supā Hīrō Taisen) featuring the casts of Kamen Rider Ex-Aid, Amazon Riders, Uchu Sentai Kyuranger, and Doubutsu Sentai Zyuohger, was released in Japan on March 25, 2017. This movie also celebrates the 10th anniversary of Kamen Rider Den-O and features the spaceship Andor Genesis from the Xevious game, which is used by the movie's main antagonists, as well as introduces the movie-exclusive Kamen Rider True Brave, played by Kamen Rider Brave's actor Toshiki Seto from Kamen Rider Ex-Aid, and the villain Shocker Great Leader III, played by the singer Diamond Yukai. In addition, individual actors from older Kamen Rider and Super Sentai TV series, Ryohei Odai (Kamen Rider Ryuki), Gaku Matsumoto (Shuriken Sentai Ninninger), Atsushi Maruyama (Zyuden Sentai Kyoryuger), and Hiroya Matsumoto (Tokumei Sentai Go-Busters) reprise their respective roles. The events of the movie takes place between episodes 23 and 24.

=== True Ending ===
Kamen Rider Ex-Aid the Movie: True Ending (劇場版 仮面ライダーエグゼイド トゥルー・エンディング, Gekijōban Kamen Raidā Eguzeido Turū Endingu) was released in the Japanese theaters on August 5, 2017, double billed with Uchu Sentai Kyuranger the Movie: Geth Indaver Strikes Back. The events of the movie took place a few days after the main series' final episode. It features the movie-exclusives Kamen Rider Fuma and his Ninja-Players, as well as the movie version of the series' final antagonist Gamedeus. The next titular character, Kamen Rider Build made his movie debut in True Ending before his chronological TV debut in Episode 44 of Ex-Aid. The movie is part of Toei's partnership with Sony to release a special Gamer Driver's color scheme of PlayStation VR for PlayStation 4. The PlayStation VR Movie was released on July 13, 2017.

=== Heisei Generations Final ===
A Movie War film, titled Kamen Rider Heisei Generations Final: Build & Ex-Aid with Legend Rider (仮面ライダー平成ジェネレーションズ FINAL ビルド&エグゼイドwithレジェンドライダー, Kamen Raidā Heisei Jenerēshonzu Fainaru Birudo Ando Eguzeido Wizu Rejendo Raidā) was announced to be released on December 9, 2017. Aside from the casts of Kamen Rider Build and Kamen Rider Ex-Aid, Shu Watanabe and Ryosuke Miura (Kamen Rider OOO), Sota Fukushi (Kamen Rider Fourze), Gaku Sano (Kamen Rider Gaim), and Shun Nishime (Kamen Rider Ghost) reprised their respective roles. The events of the movie took place a week after the film Kamen Rider Ex-Aid the Movie: True Ending.

== "Tricks" ==
The "Tricks" ([裏技], Urawaza) is a series of special episodes of Kamen Rider Ex-Aid.

- Virtual Operations (ヴァーチャルオペレーションズ, Vācharu Operēshonzu) was a web-exclusive series distributed through Toei's official YouTube channel. It accompanied the airing of the main series' episode the day after it.
1. Ex-Aid Chapter (エグゼイド編, Eguzeido-hen) takes place between Episodes 1 and 2.
2. Snipe Chapter (スナイプ編, Sunaipu-hen) takes place between Episodes 3 and 4.
3. Brave Chapter (ブレイブ編, Bureibu-hen) takes place between Episodes 4 and 5.
4. Lazer Chapter (レーザー編, Rēzā-hen) takes place between Episodes 5 and 6.
5. Genm Chapter (ゲンム編, Genmu-hen) takes place between Episodes 6 and 7.
- Kamen Rider Genm (仮面ライダーゲンム, Kamen Raidā Genmu) was a web-exclusive series released on Toei's official YouTube channel, but the final episode is exclusive to the DVD. It takes place immediately after the Heisei Generations movie, but before Episode 11.
1. Legend Rider Stage (レジェンドライダー・ステージ, Rejendo Raidā Sutēji)
2. Legend Gamer Stage (レジェンドゲーマー・ステージ, Rejendo Gēmā Sutēji)
3. Final Legend Stage (ファイナルレジェンド・ステージ, Fainaru Rejendo Sutēji)
- Kamen Rider Brave: Survive! The Revived Beast Rider Squad (仮面ライダーブレイブ ～Surviveせよ！復活のビーストライダー・スクワッド～, Kamen Raidā Bureibu Sabaibu Seyo! Fukkatsu no Bīsuto Raidā Sukuwaddo) was a web-exclusive special episode released on Toei Tokusatsu Fan Club. The story focuses on Hirro Kagami, as he battles the "Beast Rider Squad," which consists of evil replicas of Tiger from Ryuki, Beast from Wizard, Dark Kiva from Kiva, and Sasword from Kabuto, led by serial killer Takeshi Asakura also known as Kamen Rider Ouja, played by Takashi Hagino from Kamen Rider Ryuki. It also marked the return of Foundation X from Kamen Rider W which hadn't made an appearance since Kamen Rider Fourze the Movie: Space, Here We Come!. The events of the special episode take place between episodes 14 and 15.
- Kamen Rider Snipe: Episode Zero (仮面ライダースナイプ エピソードZERO, Kamen Raidā Sunaipu Episōdo Zero) is included as part of the Blu-ray releases of Kamen Rider Ex-Aid. It serves as a prequel to the main series and explores Taiga's backstory in greater detail, focusing specifically on the event that resulted in the loss of his medical license, ending his time with CR.
1. Trigger of Destiny (運命のtrigger, Unmei no Torigā)
2. Comrade Barrel (戦友にbarrel, Senyū ni Bareru)
3. Broken Safety (壊れたsafety, Kowareta Sēfuti)
4. Immortal Reload (不滅のreload, Fumetsu no Rirōdo)
- Kamen Rider Lazer (仮面ライダーレーザー, Kamen Raidā Rēzā) is Televi-Kun's "Hyper Battle DVD" (超（ハイパー）バトルDVD, Haipā Batoru Dī Bui Dī). The events of the special episode take place between Episodes 32 and 33.
- Kamen Rider Para-DX (仮面ライダーパラドクス, Kamen Raidā Paradokusu) is Televi-Kun's "Hyper Battle DVD". It is connected to Kamen Rider Ex-Aid Trilogy: Another Ending.

== Kamen Rider Ex-Aid Trilogy ==
Kamen Rider Ex-Aid Trilogy: Another Ending (仮面ライダーエグゼイド トリロジー アナザー・エンディング, Kamen Raidā Eguzeido Torirojī Anazā Endingu) is a set of three V-Cinema releases that serve as spin-offs of characters from the Kamen Rider Ex-Aid series. The events of the films take place two years after the film, Kamen Rider Heisei Generations Final: Build & Ex-Aid with Legend Rider.

1. Kamen Rider Brave & Snipe (仮面ライダーブレイブ&スナイプ, Kamen Raidā Bureibu Ando Sunaipu) is a side story focusing on Hiiro Kagami and Taiga Hanaya. The V-Cinema came out on March 28, 2018.
2. Kamen Rider Para-DX with Poppy (仮面ライダーパラドクスwithポッピー, Kamen Raidā Paradokusu Wizu Poppī) is a side story focusing on Parado and Poppy Pipopapo. The V-Cinema was released on April 11, 2018.
3. Kamen Rider Genm vs. Lazer (仮面ライダーゲンムVSレーザー, Kamen Raidā Genmu Bāsasu Rēzā) is a side story focusing on Kuroto Dan and Kiriya Kujo. The V-Cinema was released on April 25, 2018.

== Kamen Rider Genms ==
Kamen Rider Genms (仮面ライダーゲンムズ, Kamen Raidā Genmuzu) is a web-exclusive crossver series of Toei Tokusatsu Fan Club between Kamen Rider Ex-Aid and Zero-One, which mainly stars both Tetsuya Iwanaga and Nachi Sakuragi as their respective characters. The theme song is "GAME CHANGER" performed by Hiroyuki Takami, who reprised his character in the first entry.

- The Presidents (ザ・プレジデンツ, Za Purejidentsu) is the first entry of the web-exclusive series released on April 11, 2021, comprises two episodes. The events of the special take place after Zero-One Others: Kamen Rider Vulcan & Valkyrie.
- Smart Brain and the 1000% Crisis (スマートブレインと1000%のクライシス, Sumāto Burein to Sen-pāsento no Kuraishisu) is a sequel to the first entry of the web-exclusive series released on April 17, 2022, with the appearance of Smart Brain from Kamen Rider 555.

== Kamen Rider Outsiders ==
Kamen Rider Outsiders (仮面ライダーアウトサイダーズ, Kamen Raidā Autosaidāzu) is a web-exclusive crossver series of Toei Tokusatsu Fan Club between various characters from the Kamen Rider metaseries released on October 16, 2022, which is a direct sequel to Kamen Rider Genms. The theme song is "What's the Outsiders?" performed by m.c.A.T.

== Novel ==
Novel: Kamen Rider Ex-Aid: Mighty Novel X (小説 仮面ライダーエグゼイド ～マイティノベルX～, Shōsetsu Kamen Raidā Eguzeido ~Maiti Noberu Ekkusu~), written by Yuya Takahashi, is part of a series of spin-off novel adaptions of the Heisei Era Kamen Riders. The events of the novel take place three years after Kamen Rider Ex-Aid Trilogy: Another Ending. The novel was released on June 27, 2018.

== Video game ==
Kamen Rider: Climax Fighters (仮面ライダー クライマックスファイターズ, Kamen Raidā Kuraimakkusu Faitāzu), is the sixth installment of the Kamen Rider: Climax series, which was released on December 7, 2017 for PlayStation 4. It's a role-playing fighting game and featuring characters from Kamen Rider Ex-Aid and Kamen Rider Build.

== Cast ==
- Emu Hojo (宝生 永夢, Hōjō Emu): Hiroki Iijima (飯島 寛騎, Iijima Hiroki)
- Hiiro Kagami (鏡 飛彩, Kagami Hiiro): Toshiki Seto (瀬戸 利樹, Seto Toshiki)
- Taiga Hanaya (花家 大我, Hanaya Taiga): Ukyo Matsumoto (松本 享恭, Matsumoto Ukyō)
- Kuroto Dan (檀 黎斗, Dan Kuroto): Tetsuya Iwanaga (岩永 徹也, Iwanaga Tetsuya)
- Asuna Karino (仮野 明日那, Karino Asuna), Poppy Pipopapo (ポッピーピポパポ, Poppī Pipopapo): Ruka Matsuda (松田るか, Matsuda Ruka)
- Kiriya Kujo (九条 貴利矢, Kujō Kiriya): Hayato Onozuka (小野塚 勇人, Onozuka Hayato)
- Parado (パラド): Shouma Kai (甲斐 翔真, Kai Shōma)
- Graphite (グラファイト, Gurafaito): Shouma Machii (町井 祥真, Machii Shōma)
- Nico Saiba (西馬 ニコ, Saiba Niko): Reina Kurosaki (黒崎 レイナ, Kurosaki Reina)
- Tsukuru Koboshi (小星 作, Koboshi Tsukuru): Shohei Uno (宇野 祥平, Uno Shōhei)
- Ren Amagasaki (天ヶ崎 恋, Amagasaki Ren): Shinya Kote (小手 伸也, Kote Shinya)
- Masamune Dan (檀 正宗, Dan Masamune): Hiroyuki Takami (貴水 博之, Takami Hiroyuki)
- Haima Kagami (鏡 灰馬, Kagami Haima): Hanamaru Hakata (博多 華丸, Hakata Hanamaru)
- Kyotaro Hinata (日向 恭太郎, Hinata Kyōtarō): Hironobu Nomura (野村 宏伸, Nomura Hironobu)

=== Voice cast ===
- Gamer Driver (ゲーマドライバー, Gēma Doraibā), Rider Gashats (ライダーガシャット, Raidā Gashatto): Hironobu Kageyama (影山 ヒロノブ, Kageyama Hironobu)
- Lovrica Bugster (ラヴリカバグスター, Ravurika Bagusutā), Gashacon Bugvisor II (ガシャコンバグヴァイザーII, Gashakon Baguvaizā Tsuvai)/Buggle Driver II (バグルドライバーII, Baguru Doraibā Tsuvai), Narrator: Junichi Suwabe (諏訪部 順一, Suwabe Jun'ichi)

=== Guest cast ===
- Ryōko Kitami (北見 諒子, Kitami Ryōko; 3): Sanae Hitomi (人見 早苗, Hitomi Sanae)
- Yoshitaka Nishiwaki (西脇 嘉高, Nishiwaki Yoshitaka; 4, 22): Takuya Negishi (根岸 拓哉, Negishi Takuya)
- Riko Nishiwaki (西脇 莉子, Nishiwaki Riko; 4): Runa Natsui (夏居 瑠奈, Natsui Runa)
- Koba (コバ; 8): Tomonori Okano (岡野 友紀, Okano Tomonori)
- Minako Yamanaka (山中 美奈子, Yamanaka Minako; 11–12): Hitomi Miwa (三輪 ひとみ, Miwa Hitomi)
- Kazuki Shirakawa (白河 一樹, Shirakawa Kazuki; 13–14): Kohki Okada (岡田 浩暉, Okada Kōki)
- Heiji Uesugi (上杉 平次, Uesugi Heiji; 21, 45): Taro Suwa (諏訪 太朗, Suwa Tarō)
- Lucky (ラッキー, Rakkī; 24): Takumi Kizu (岐洲 匠, Kizu Takumi)
- Sora Iwamoto (岩本 ソラ, Iwamoto Sora; 24): Miku Oono (大野 未来, Ōno Miku)
- Ichiro Kusano (草野 一郎, Kusano Ichirō; 34): Ryotaro Sakaguchi (坂口 涼太郎, Sakaguchi Ryōtaro)
- Johnny Maxima (ジョニー・マキシマ, Jonī Makishima; 41): Brother Tom (ブラザー・トム, Burazā Tomu)
- Tōko Suzuki (鈴木 塔子, Suzuki Tōko; 42–44): Miyuu Sawai (沢井 美優, Sawai Miyū)
- Kamen Rider Build (仮面ライダービルド, Kamen Raidā Birudo; Voice; 44): Atsuhiro Inukai (犬飼 貴丈, Inukai Atsuhiro)

== Theme songs ==
Opening theme

- "EXCITE"
  - Lyrics: Kanata Okajima, Daichi Miura
  - Composition: Carpainter, Kanata Okajima
  - Arrangement: UTA, Carpainter
  - Artist: Daichi Miura
  - Episodes: 2–11, 13–14, 25–44
  Episodes 1, 12, 15–24, and 45 do not feature the show's opening sequence. This song is used as the ending theme in episodes 1, 15, and 18–24, and as an insert song in episodes 4, 12, 16–17, 32, and 45.

Insert themes

- "Let's Try Together"
  - Lyrics: BOUNCEBACK, kenko-p
  - Composition & Arrangement: Hirofumi Hibino
  - Artist: Kamen Rider Girls
  - Episodes: 13–15
- "Wish in the dark"
  - Lyrics: Kyasu Morizuki, Mio Aoyama
  - Composition: Takehito Shimizu
  - Arrangement: Toru Watanabe
  - Artist: Hiroyuki Takami
  - Episodes: 17–18
- "PEOPLE GAME"
  - Lyrics: Yuya Takahashi
  - Composition: Katsumi Ohnishi
  - Arrangement: Toru Watanabe, ats-
  - Artist: Poppy Pipopapo (Ruka Matsuda)
  - Episodes: 24–26
- "Real Game"
  - Lyrics: Takayuki Tazawa
  - Composition: Keiichi Miyako
  - Arrangement: Rayflower
  - Artist: Rayflower
  - Episodes: 29
- "JUSTICE"
  - Lyrics: Mio Aoyama
  - Composition: Natsumi
  - Arrangement: Takehito Shimizu, Toru Watanabe
  - Artist: Hiroyuki Takami
  - Episodes: 33
- "Time of Victory"
  - Lyrics: Misa Kuwatani, Kyasu Morizuki
  - Composition: Misa Kuwatani
  - Arrangement: ats-
  - Artist: Kamen Rider Girls
  - Episodes: 36

== International broadcast ==
Country	Network(s)	Note(s)
Indonesia	RTV	????
Thailand	Workpoint TV	????
Singapore	Aniplus Asia	????
Saudi Arabia	MBC 4	????
