= Girls² =

Japanese idol girl group

Girls^{2}
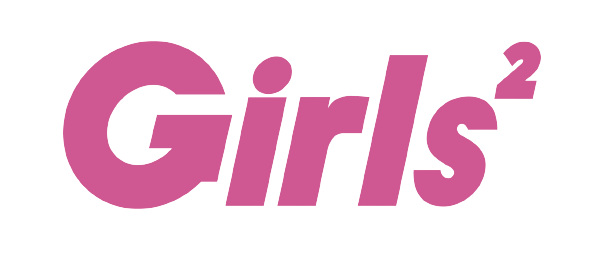
- Group logo

Background information
- Origin: Japan
- Genre: J-pop
- Years active: 2019–present
- Label: Sony Music Associated Records · Rhythm Zone · LDH
- Members: Yuzuha Oda; Momoka Sumitani; Misaki Tsuruya; Youka Ogawa; Kurea Masuda; Minami Hishida; Kira Yamaguchi
- Past members: Ran Ishii; Toa Harada
- Website: Official website

Girls^{2} (pronounced "Girls Girls") is a Japanese idol girl group formed by LDH in 2019. The group consist of EXPG Studio graduates who starred in Takashi Miike's Girls × Heroine series. The group debuted in June 2019 with the release of their first single, "Daijyoubu."

== History ==
=== Pre-debut: Girls × Heroine series ===
In December 2015, Yuzuha Oda, previously a member of the idol girl group Amorecarina, participated in the TV Girls Drama Audition held by Ciao, Pucchigumi, and LDH, winning a starring role in the 2017 series Idol × Warrior Miracle Tunes! as Fuka Tachibana, a member of the girl group Miracle^{2}. Oda performed and portrayed her character on television and music events with the rest of the Miracle^{2} members. When Idol × Warrior Miracle Tunes! became successful, LDH held the TV Girls Drama Audition in summer 2017 for the next installment of the series, Magical × Heroine Magimajo Pures!, which Momoka Sumitani, Misaki Tsuruya, Youka Ogawa, and Kurea Masuda had won starring roles as Rin Shirayuki, Mitsuki Hanamori, Shiori Hoshina, and Yuria Nijiiro. They released music for the series under the group name Magical^{2}, portraying their characters on television.

=== 2019: Debut ===
After the musical success of Miracle^{2} and Magical^{2}, LDH debuted all previous members signed to their company as a supergroup named Girls^{2}, along with cast members from the newly announced 2019 series Secret × Heroine Phantomirage!, Minami Hishida, Kira Yamaguchi, and Toa Harada, winners in the actress category of the 2018 LDH The Girls Audition and members of the girl group mirage^{2}. Prior to entering acting, Sumitani, Ogawa, Masuda, and Yamaguchi were part of EXPG's U-14 female trainee group, Kizzy.

Approximately 2,000 people attended their debut showcase in Osaka. As a group, Girls^{2} released their debut single, "Daijyoubu", on June 26, 2019, as the opening theme song for Secret × Heroine Phantomirage! On July 6, 2019, Ran Ishii, a new cast member Secret × Heroine Phantomirage! and their tie-in group, Mirage^{2}, was added as a member. She made her official debut with the group on October 30, 2019, with their first mini-album Koisuru Kamo.

Girls2 have collaborated with popular sports brand FILA and the kids streetwear TEG TEG.

Girls2 placed 3rd on Mercari's rank of 2019's most "trendiest word" and Ran Ishii ranked 20th on the second half of 2019 TV Appearance Ranking.

In December 2019, Girls^{2} announced they will be performing the theme song, "ABCDEF Girl", for the film Gekijōban: Secret × Heroine Phantomirage!: Eiga ni Natte Chōdaishimasu. Their song "Guru Guru" was also used as the theme song for 2020 film Eiga: Neko Neko Nihonshi: Ryūma no Hachamecha Time Trouble ze yo!

=== 2020: First tour, documentary, and anime series ===
On November 17, 2019, Girls2 announced their first Live Tour "Girls2 LIVE TOUR ~Chuwapane~" that would run in 8 towns starting from March 7 until June 28, 2020. They were also the opening act for E-girls PERFECT LIVE 2011 2020. To commemorate the tour, a Girls2 cafe was announced to run from March 20 to April 6. A documentary titled Girls^{2}: The Miracle of 9 aired on TV Tokyo on March 22 and March 29.

On March 3, 2020, Oha Suta announced they will be featuring a series of animated segments starring the members and titled GARUGAKU. Saint Girls Square Academy. It began airing on April 6 every Monday with Girls2 voicing their own characters, as well as providing the opening theme, "Centimeter". On March 6, 2020, Girls^{2} were announced to be performing the theme song to the live-action film adaptation of Kiss Him, Not Me, titled "Watashi ga Motete Dōsunda."

For the entire month of March, a project named "Ten Made Todoke" was held where a series of 10 announcements were to be released (later adding additional news). Announcements included Girls2 appearance on Numa ni Hamatte Kiite Mita, Mirage^{2} best album, Girls2 to provide ED theme "Zuttomo Heart Beats" for Go Astro Boy Go! and many more. Due to the coronavirus and music stores closing down, the release for their 2nd mini-album "Chuwapane", which was originally scheduled or April 29, was postponed to May 20.

Tsuruya and Yamaguchi were announced to become the newest regulars for the BS Fuji morning show "Gachamuku", where they replaced E-girls Yuzuna Takebe and Anna Ishii. Their broadcast began in July.

After the completion of Phantomirage, it was revealed that Girls^{2} would also provide the opening theme for Police × Heroine Lovepatrina! titled "Daiji na Mono" featuring the lovely2 members. Their 2nd EP is to be released on November 18. Another Online Live was also announced for November 15.

On September 24, a new project "Asadan" was announced, where Girls2 would appear on the program "Asadesu." with dance exercise instructors Keiji (Keiji Kuroki) and Bobby (Exile Nesmith). The theme song "Dancing" was released digitally on October 1 with Keiji and Bobby as features.

Two new songs were announced on October 6 and will be used as the opening and ending themes for the anime Meow Meow Japanese History. "Japanese STAR" and "Neko Neko Nihonshi Oboe Uta ~Zen Jidai Maruwakari♪~" was released digitally on October 7.

Girls2 digitally released "#Kizuna Plus" on October 14 which will be used as the first image song for Takeshita Street, Harajuku. Their song "HERE WE GO" will also be used as the "WEGO×Girls^{2} 2020 Collaboration Song", with their collaboration outfits available from November 18. They performed both songs on "TGC Teens 2020 Winter Live" on November 13. Another documentary, Girls^{2} REVOLUTION, is set to be released through their YouTube channel on January 2, 2021, for 24 episodes.

=== 2021: AnimeLIVE, Girls Revolution and Drama ===
On December 23, 2020, it was revealed on Oha Suta that Girls^{2} are to provide the theme song "STARRRT!" for the film Gekijōban Police x Heroine Lovepatrina! Kaitō kara no Chōsen! Love de Papatto Taihoseyo!, which is to be released on April 29, 2021. On March 1, all 9 Girls^{2} members were announced to be cast, starring as their Heroine roles.

Girls2 1st LIVE PICTUREBOOK "Kyunin no Kizuna" was released on February 25, 2021.

The GaruGaku AnimeLIVE 2021 ~Tsunagu Tsunagu~ took place on March 27 and 28 where on the 2nd day, announced that a Garugaku live action drama would release summer 2021 on TV Tokyo. It was further revealed that they would provide the theme song with Oha Suta host, Subaru Kimura, would feature.

On May 31, 2021, Masuda was revealed as one of the regular casts for the 5th instalment of the Girls x Heroine series Kirameki Powers, playing the role of Princess. On March 31, 2023, Ishii announced that she was leaving the group to focus on a different direction in her career as a singer.

== Subgroups ==
=== Oha Girl from Girls^{2} ===
Beginning April 2019, Oda, Sumitani, Tsuruya, Ogawa, and Masuda became regulars on the children's variety show Oha Suta as the new Oha Girls, performing under the name Oha Girl from Girls^{2} with each member appearing on a different day from Mondays to Fridays. Every school semester, the girls provide a new theme song for the show as well as a different sports uniform. Oha Girl from Girls^{2} released their debut single, "Hashire! Getsu-Ka-Sui-Moku-Kinyōbi!" on August 7, 2019. On December 18, 2019, Oha Girl from Girls^{2} released their second single, "Ohayō no Smile." The CD single also includes the song "Friendship No. 1" performed by Tsuruya and Masuda under the name Misaki Kurea from Girls^{2}, which was used as the ending theme song to Puzzle & Dragons X for the month of October. Their 3rd single, for the 3rd school semester, "Girl Meets Girl", was released on February 19, 2020.

Announced through OhaSuta on March 27, 2020, the four Mirage^{2} members joined the OhaGirls, making all 9 Girls^{2} members part of the OhaSuta cast. The girls were also included in the Oha Suta All Stars Single "Ashita wo Tsukurou".

The senior Oha Girls: Yuzuha, Momoka, Misaki, Youka and Kurea, graduated from the group in March 2021.

=== GaruGaku Units ===
With the announcement of the Girls^{2} anime, GARUGAKU. Saint Girls Square Academy, 3 sub-units exclusive to the anime were also announced. These included, east^{2} (Yuzuha and Ran), south^{2} (Misaki, Kurea, Kira and Youka) and west^{2} (Momoka and Minami). Toa later joins east^{2}. Each unit song is used as an ending for the anime. For Ciao Fest Online, a special medley of the GaruGaku songs were performed. As well as this, the ending themes for the anime were also used as the theme songs for "Ohasuta".

On December 1, Girls^{2} announced they will hold another collaboration with Takeshita Street, but with GaruGaku called "Girls^{2}×GaruGaku=Happy^{2}Winter2020 Takeshita Street". The song used was South2's newest song Holy Magic ~Otona ni Natte mo Tokenai Mahou~.

On January 24, 2021, via OhaSuta, the GaruGaku. Complete Best album and AnimeLIVE 2021 was announced.

== Members ==
- Yuzuha Oda (小田 柚葉) from Miracle^{2}
- Momoka Sumitani (隅谷 百花) from Magical^{2}
- Misaki Tsuruya (鶴屋 美咲) from Magical^{2} – leader
- Youka Ogawa (小川 桜花) from Magical^{2}
- Kurea Masuda (増田 來亜) from Magical^{2}
- Minami Hishida (菱田 未渚美) from Mirage^{2}
- Kira Yamaguchi (山口 綺羅) from Mirage^{2}

=== Former members ===
- Toa Harada (原田 都愛) from Mirage^{2} (2019–2025)
- Ran Ishii (石井 蘭) from Mirage^{2} (2019–2023)

== Discography ==
=== Singles ===
Title	Year	Peak chart positions		Sales	Album
Title	Year	JPN	JPN Hot	Sales	Album
"Daijyoubu" (ダイジョウブ)	2019	3	29	JPN: 22,577	We are Girls²
"Watashi ga Motete Dousunda" (私がモテてどうすんだ)	2020	8	—		We are Girls²
"Daiji na Mono (大事なモノ) / "Kizuna Plus" (＃キズナプラス)	2020	5	—		We are Girls²
"Japanese Star"	2021	19	—		Non-album single
"Girls Revolution" / "Party Time!"	2021	—	—		We are Girls²
"C'mon Neo Zipang" / "Juga Juga JUNGLE"	2022	5			We are Girls² -Ⅱ-
"Rock Steady" (Girls²×iScream)	2023	7	26		We are Girls² -Ⅱ-
"D.N.A." (Girls²×iScream)	2024	6	49		Non-album singles
"Snowflakes" / "Unmelting Snow"	2025	5	—		Non-album singles
As Oha Girl from Girls^{2}
"Hashire! Getsu-Ka-Sui-Moku-Kinyōbi" (走れ!月火水木金曜日!)	2019	11	—	JPN: 9,467	Ohagirl☆THE BEST -2019~2022- (おはガール☆THE BEST -2019～2022-)
"Ohayō no Smile" (おはようのスマイル)	2019	7	—		Ohagirl☆THE BEST -2019~2022- (おはガール☆THE BEST -2019～2022-)
"Girl Meets Girl"	2020	17	—		Ohagirl☆THE BEST -2019~2022- (おはガール☆THE BEST -2019～2022-)
"—" denotes releases that did not chart or were not released in that region; blank cells indicate data not yet sourced.

=== Extended plays ===
Title	Year	EP details	Peak chart positions		Sales
Title	Year	EP details	JPN	JPN Hot	Sales
Koisuru Kamo (恋するカモ)	2019	Released: October 30, 2019; Label: Sony Music Associated Records; Formats: CD, digital download	6	TBA	JPN: 20,141
Chuwapane! (チュワパネ！)	2020	Released: May 20, 2020; Label: Sony Music Associated Records; Formats: CD, digital download	3	3	JPN: 19,621
"Enjoy" / "Good Days"	2021	Released: August 25, 2021; Label: Sony Music Associated Records; Formats: CD, digital download	4	3	JPN: 12,348+
"Shangri-la"	2022	Released: August 24, 2022; Label: Sony Music Associated Records; Formats: CD, digital download	3		
"Love Genic" / "Bye-Bye-Bye"	2022	Released: December 21, 2022; Label: Sony Music Associated Records; Formats: CD, digital download	6		
"Countdown"	2023	Released: May 24, 2023; Label: Sony Music Associated Records; Formats: CD, digital download	5		
"Accelerate"	2023	Released: December 20, 2023; Label: Sony Music Associated Records; Formats: CD, digital download	4		
Yorimichi -Take it easy baby- (寄り道 -Take it easy baby-)	2024	Released: October 30, 2024; Label: Sony Music Associated Records; Formats: CD, digital download	6		
"New Era"	2025	Released: September 24, 2025; Label: Rhythm Zone; Formats: CD, digital download	7		
"Melty Love"	2026	Released: April 1, 2026; Label: Rhythm Zone; Formats: CD, digital download	7		
"—" denotes releases that did not chart or were not released in that region; blank cells indicate data not yet sourced.

=== Albums ===
Title	Year	Album details
We are Girls²	2022	Released: January 12, 2022; Label: Sony Music Associated Records; Formats: CD, digital download
We are Girls² -Ⅱ-	2024	Released: March 20, 2024; Label: Sony Music Associated Records; Formats: CD, digital download
Seven Blooms	2026	Released: June 24, 2026; Label: Rhythm Zone; Formats: CD, digital download

=== Compilation albums ===
Title	Year	Album details
TV Anime "GaruGaku: St. Girls Square Academy" Complete Best (TVアニメ『ガル学。～聖ガールズスクエア学院～』コンプリート・ベスト)	2021	Released: March 24, 2021; Label: Sony Music Associated Records; Formats: CD, digital download
Ohagirl☆THE BEST -2019~2022- (おはガール☆THE BEST -2019～2022-)	2022	Released: February 23, 2022; Label: Sony Music Associated Records; Formats: CD, digital download

== Filmography ==
=== Television ===
Year	Title	Role	Network	Notes
2019–2021	Oha Suta	Oha Girls from Girls^{2}	TV Tokyo	Variety show regulars: Toa (Monday), Kira (Tuesday), Ran (Thursday) and Minami (Wednesday and Friday). Former Oha Girls Yuzuha, Momoka, Misaki, Youka and Kurea from 2019 to 2021.
2020	Girls^{2}: The Miracle of 9 (Girls^{2} ～9人のキセキ～)	Themselves	TV Tokyo	Documentary
2020–2021	GaruGaku: Saint Girls Square Academy	Themselves	TV Tokyo	Voice in anime; segments aired in Oha Suta
2020–present	Gachamuku (ガチャムク)	Themselves	BS Fuji	Regulars: Misaki Tsuruya and Kira Yamaguchi
2020	Asadesu. (アサデス。)	Themselves	KBC	Regulars: Misaki Tsuruya, Kurea Masuda, Kira Yamaguchi and Youka Ogawa
2021	GaruGaku	Themselves	TV Tokyo	Live action drama

=== Film ===
Year	Title	Role	Notes
2020	Kiss Him, Not Me	Cameo	Misaki Tsuruya, Youka Ogawa, Kurea Masuda, Kira Yamaguchi, and Ran Ishii
