= Oha Suta =

Japanese children's television series

- Genre: Variety; Children's television Information program
- Directed by: Masakazu Kubo (Shogakukan)
- Presented by: Subaru Kimura
- Starring: Oha Kids
- Country of origin: Japan
- Original language: Japanese

Production
- Producer: Keisuke Date
- Running time: 25 minutes
- Production companies: TV Tokyo; ShoPro; ProTX

Original release
- Network: TXN (TV Tokyo)
- Release: October 1, 1997 – present

Related
- Ohayō Studio

Oha Suta (Japanese: おはスタ, romanized: Oha Suta) is a Japanese children's breakfast television show. Produced by Shogakukan-Shueisha Productions (ShoPro) for TV Tokyo, the show airs on TX Network (TXN). It premiered in 1997 as a relaunch of Ohayō Studio (Japanese: おはようスタジオ, romanized: Ohayō Sutajio, lit. 'Studio Good Morning'. Sutajio is a loanword from English word "studio"), which originally ran from 2 April 1979 to 27 June 1986 on what is now TXN; the title of this revival, Oha Suta, comes from the portmanteau of the original Ohayō Studio.

== Cast ==
- Subaru Kimura

=== Oha Girls & Oha Kids ===
Oha Girls are cast members consisting of girls in their early-mid teens who act as co-hosts and musical performers. Previous Oha Girls include Haruka Suenaga and Nozomi Maeda.

- Oha Girl Apple (おはガールアップル, July 1998 - September 1998)
- Oha Girl Banana (おはガールバナナ, October 1998 - March 1999)
- Oha Girl Citrus (おはガールシトラス, April 1999 - March 2000)
- Oha Girl Cherry (おはガールチェリー, April 1999 - March 2000)
- Oha Girl Grape (おはガールグレープ, April 2001 - March 2002)
- Oha Girl Fruitpunch (おはガールフルーツポンチ, April 2002 - March 2003)
- Oha Girl Starfruit (おはガールスターフルーツ, April 2003 - March 2004)
- Oha Girl Starfruit 2 (おはガールスターフルー2, April 2004 - March 2005)
- Oha Girl Candy Mint (おはガールキャンディミント, April 2005 - March 2007)
- Oha Girl 2007-2008 (おはガール, April 2007 - March 2008)
- Oha Girl 2008-2009 (おはガール, April 2008 - March 2009)
- Oha Girl 2009-2010 (おはガール, April 2009 - March 2010)
- Oha Girl Maple (おはガールメープル, April 2010 - March 2012)
- Oha Girl Chu! Chu! Chu! (おはガールちゅ！ちゅ！ちゅ！, April 2012 - March 2014)
- Oha Girl 2015 - 2017 (おはガール, April 2015 - September 2017)
- Oha Girl 2017 - 2019 (おはガール, October 2017 - September 2019)
- Oha Girl From Girls² (おはガール From Girls², April 2019 – October 2021)
- Oha Girl From Lucky² (おはガール From Lucky², October 2021 – March 2022)
- Shin Oha Girl (シン・おはガール, April 2022 – March 2024)
- Oha Kids 2024 - 2026 (おはキッズ, April 2024 – March 2026)
- Oha Kids 2026 (おはキッズ, April 2026 – present)

== Segments ==
=== Anime ===
- Crash! (2012)
- Sugar Soldier (2014)
- Romantica Clock (2014)
- Tsubasa to Hotaru (2015–2016)
- GaruGaku: Saint Square Girls Academy (2020–2022)
