= Secret × Heroine Phantomirage! =

Anime

- First promotional poster
- ひみつ×戦士 ファントミラージュ!
- Genre: Tokusatsu, magical girl, children
- Created by: TOMY; OLM
- Written by: Yoichi Kato; Mao Aoki; Kana Matsui; Yuya Nakazono
- Directed by: Takashi Miike; Yoshitaka Yamaguchi; Takeshi Yokoi; Kenichiro Nishiumi; Ryosuke Kurahashi; Katsutoshi Hirano
- Starring: Minami Hishida; Kira Yamaguchi; Toa Harada; Ran Ishii
- Narrated by: Toshiyuki Toyonaga
- Theme music composer: Takashi Tadokoro
- Opening theme: "Daijyoubu (Mirage^{2} version)" by Girls^{2} (eps. 1-13); "Koisuru Kamo (Mirage^{2} version)" by Girls^{2} (eps. 14-39); "Chuwapane" by Girls^{2} (eps. 40-64)
- Ending theme: "Jan Ken Pon" by Mirage^{2} (eps. 1-13); "Doki Doki" by Mirage^{2} (eps. 14-26); "Kiseki" by Mirage^{2} (eps. 27-39); "Saite-Saite" by Mirage^{2} (eps. 40-51); "Arukidasou" by Mirage^{2} (eps. 52-64)
- Composer: Koji Endo
- Country of origin: Japan
- Original language: Japanese
- No. of episodes: 64

Production
- Producer: Misako Saka
- Production companies: TV Tokyo; Dentsu; OLM

Original release
- Network: TXN (TV Tokyo)
- Release: April 7, 2019 – June 28, 2020

Related
- Magical × Heroine Magimajo Pures!; Police × Heroine Lovepatrina!

Secret × Heroine Phantomirage! (ひみつ×戦士 ファントミラージュ!, Himitsu Senshi Fantomirāju!) is a Japanese television drama series that aired from April 7, 2019, to June 28, 2020. It is the third installment of the Girls × Heroine Series produced by Takara Tomy and OLM, Inc. with the assistance of Shogakukan and EXPG Studio. The series stars Minami Hishida, Kira Yamaguchi, Toa Harada, and Ran Ishii. Additional cast members include Mandy Sekiguchi, Tsubasa Honda, and Takumi Saitoh, with narration provided by Toshiyuki Toyonaga. The plot is centered on Phantomirage, a group of middle school gentleman thieves who fight the Gyakugyaku Police, and steal the treasures in people's hearts. This was the last installment of the Girls × Heroine series to be produced in the Heisei period, and the first to be produced in the Reiwa period.

The show launched a brief idol career for the main cast, who hold music activities as the Japanese idol girl group Mirage, and Girls to promote the show. Following the show's end in 2020, it was succeeded by Police × Heroine Lovepatrina!

== Plot ==
Kokomi Sakurai is a cherry tomato-loving first-year middle schooler. One day, she encounters Kumachi, a bear-like fairy chased by the Reverse Police, a group of bad cops who use the Reverse Jewels to turn "cool people" into "Ikenaiers", evil versions of themselves, to search for comrades of justice. Kokomi's father is turned into an Ikenaier by the Reverse Police. Kokomi is chosen by the Phantomi Wristy to transform into Phantomirage, and they become mass media sensations. They are warned to conceal their identities from the public.

== Characters ==
=== Phantomirage ===
Phantomirage is a group of phantom thieves recruited by Phandy to recover the Secret Keys. In order to do so, they steal Reverse Jewels from people's hearts to purify them into Secret Keys. Each girl owns Secret Keys and the Phantomi Ring, which they can use to transform using a brace-like Phantomi Wristy (ファントミリスティ, Fantomirisutī). Each girl uses a Phantomi Trick (ファントミトリック, Fantomitorikku), the key-like baton that extracts and purifies Reverse Jewels into a Secret Keys. The Secret Keys allow them to use different spy and stealth capabilities with their Phantomi Wristy. After meeting Phangry, they are given the pocket watch/compass-shaped Phantomi Time and the Kizuna Key, that will allow the girls to power up into a mode called "Kizuna Style" and use the gun-like weapon Phantomi Final. They are given another item by Phandy called the Phantomi Coffret, where they have to collect the fragrance-like artifacts Phantomi Perfumes.

Kokomi Sakurai (桜衣ココミ, Sakurai Kokomi)
Played by: Minami Hishida
Kokomi is a bright and energetic girl who loves fun things and people's smiles. Her family owns a bakery and cafe called Sweets Cafe, which is very popular among both teenagers and young adults. She holds the Heart Ring to transforms into the pink colored Phantomi Heart (ファントミハート, Fantomi Hāto). Her catchphrase is "My heart is fluttering!"

Saki Asumi (明日海サキ, Asumi Saki)
Played by: Kira Yamaguchi
Saki is a cheerful and trendy girl who knows the latest news. She holds the Spade Ring to transforms into the blue-colored Phantomi Spade (ファントミスペード, Fantomi Supēdo). Her catchphrase is "It's just getting started!"

Yotsuba Shizuki (紫月ヨツバ, Shizuki Yotsuba)
Played by: Toa Harada
Yotsuba is gentle girl who has a high regard towards her family, she was raised with her little sister by their single mother. Yotsuba wished to be a Phantomirage so that she could protect those she loved. She holds the Clover Ring to transforms into the purple colored Phantomi Clover (ファントミローバー, Fantomi Kurōbā). Her catchphrase is "I want to protect those precious to me!"

Seira Kureha (紅羽セイラ, Kureha Seira)
Played by: Ran Ishii
In the beginning, Seira was a mysterious girl who gives clues about her identity. She initially refused to work with the girls due to believing they were un-phantomi like, preferring to work on her own. She later agrees to join after realising that her father, a phantom thief, failed because he was alone. Using the Diamond Ring and the Phantomi Dial (ファントミディアル, Fantomidiaru), Seira transforms into the red-colored Phantomi Diamond (ファントミダイヤ, Fantomi Daiya). Her catchphrase is "You are, Phantomi-like!"

=== Allies and Civilians ===
Kumachi (くまちぃ, Kumachī)
Voiced by: Tsubasa Honda
A teddy bear-like fairy who sent by Phandy to search for the Phantomirage. Their silk hat is a portal that sends the Reverse Jewels, that the Phantomirage retrieve, to Phandy.

Phandy (ファンディー, Fandī)
Played by: Mandy Sekiguchi
Phantomirage's stern and immature mentor, he sent Kumachi to the human world to recruit the Phantomirage members in order collect the Reverse Jewels which he keeps in his safe. Normally communicating with the Phantomirage via holograms, he warns them not to reveal their true identities or something bad will happen.

Phangry/Jun Oguri (ファングリ / 大栗純, Fanguri / Ōguri Jun)
Played by: Shun Oguri
Phandy's polite and sentient older brother who works with the Phantomirage as well as being a famous actor. He provides the Phantomi Time and the Kizuna Key, that will allow the girls to power up.

Shinichi Sakurai (桜衣慎一, Sakurai Shin'ichi)
Played by: Takumi Saitoh
Kokomi's father runs a family bakery and café where his daughter and her friends usually hang out. He later leaves for the Amazon to search for cacao.

Minoru Umeno (梅野 実, Umeno Minoru)
Played by: Takafumi Imai
Shinichi Sakurai's pupil who took charge of the shop while his boss went to the Amazon in search of cacao.

Kazuha Shizuki (紫⽉ ⼀葉, Shizuki Kazuha)
Played by: Seiko Iwaidou
Yotsuba and Nanoha's mother who works at a flower shop.

Nanoha Shizuki (紫⽉ ナノハ, Shizuki Nanoha)
Played by: Miyu Sasaki
Yotsuba's little sister who triggers Yotsuba to want to become a Phantomirage.

Fumiaki Sakagami (坂上 ⽂秋, Sakagami Fumiaki)
Played by: Ryōka Minamide
Fumiaki is Kokomi and Saki's classmate who is a member of the school's newspaper club. Intrigued by the Phantomirage, he writes many articles regarding the girls.

Juri Anna (安奈ジュリ, Anna Juri)
Played by: Miyu Yagyū
Kokomi's health teacher and their dance club mentor, who changes to "Julia" when wearing a blonde wig that triggers her love of dance. She is also Phandy's pupil, sent to assist the girls.

Sarai (サライ, Sarai)
Played by: Rina Yamaguchi
Sarai was an abandoned doll that SakaSama turned into a cheerful 5th grade student with the ability to enhance Reverse Jewels into Ultimate Reverse Jewels. While given the task of exposing Phantomirage's civilian identities, she kept the information to herself while occasionally forcing the Reverse Police to play with her. The revelation from learning of her true origins causes Sarai to power herself up into Dark Sarai before being purified by Phantomirage, permanently turning her human as a result. She becomes friends with Phantomirage, even gaining her own Phantomi Coffret and Phantomi Perfume. The producer confirmed Sarai will be return in Police × Heroine Lovepatrina! as a main character.

Amigo (アミーゴ, Amīgo)
Played by: Dream Ami
Phantomirage's mischievous senior with overly exaggerated expressions. Her alter ego is "Phantomi Queen". Her theme color is gold.

=== Reverse Police ===
Reverse Police (逆逆警察, Gyakugyaku Keisatsu) are an illegal police group from the Reverse World who "Reverse Arrest" a nice and cool person, using the Reverse Jewels to polarize their hearts and turn them into an evil, uncool Ikenaiers (イケナイヤー, Ikenaiyā).

SakaSama (サカサーマ, Sakasāma)
Played by: Dandy Sakano
The heartless ruler of the Reverse World who seeks to turn everyone "uncool", resembling a reversed "Akiramestone". When the Phantomirage members interfere in his plans, he uses the energy that Reverse Police gathered to create Sarai and use her to deal with Phantomirage before she ultimately sided with the girls.

Chief Gyanne (ギャンヌ署長, Gyannu-shochō)
Played by: Nicole Ishida
The Chief of the Reverse Police, who usually makes her subordinates to do all the work.

Officer Magyaku (マギャク巡査, Magyaku-junsa)
Played by: Kōdai Kuroishi
The Clique of the Reverse Police in a kindergarten uniform who is normally partnered with Abekobe, preferring forceful arrests than thinking things through.

Detective Abekobe (アベコベ刑事, Abekobe Deka)
Played by: Pee
The brains of the Reverse Police, though it is a mystery if they're actually smart or not.

Chief Summer (サマー署長, Samā-shochō)
Played by: Miyuki Ōshima
A summer-only leader of the group, who resembles shaved ice.

== Production ==
In 2018, LDH held a casting call for child talents through an audition titled LDH Presents The Girls Audition, with results later broadcast on an episode of TBS's Gekidan Exile, which aired on November 6, 2018. Minami Hishida, Kira Yamaguchi, and Toa Harada were announced as winners in the actress category. Phantomirage was trademarked in December 2018.

The full cast and details about the show were unveiled during its first press conference on February 26, 2019, where Hishida, Yamaguchi, and Harada were announced as the main cast. Prior to debuting as an actress, Yamaguchi had been part of EXPG Studio's female U-14 trainee group, Kizzy. The supporting cast consisted of Mandy Sekiguchi, Takumi Saitoh, Nicole Ishida, Kodai Kuroishi, and Pee, in addition to Tsubasa Honda providing the voice to Kumachi and Toshiyuki Toyonaga providing the narration. Ran Ishii was announced as a new cast member on June 13, 2019.

Kodai Asaka, Keiko Inoue from the comedy duo Nitche, Takeshi Nadagi, Masumi Yagi from the comedy duo Savanna, Koyuki Takahashi from the comedy duo Nihon Electric Rengo, Yui-P, and Ryo Kato were announced as upcoming guest characters. Yuki Miyoshi, Momoka Sumitani, Misaki Tsuruya, Youka Ogawa, and Kurea Masuda reprised their roles from Magical × Heroine Magimajo Pures! in episode 7, while Yuzuha Oda reprised her role from Idol × Warrior Miracle Tunes! in episode 11. Shun Oguri guest-starred as Phandy's older brother, Phangry, in episodes 25 to 27.

Episode 17, which aired on July 28, 2019, was a crossover episode arc with episode 68 of Kiratto Pri☆Chan. Phantomirage features the Miracle Kirats and Anju wearing their outfits, while Kiratto Pri☆Chan features a crossover episode with the Phantomirage members appearing in animated format.

During the show's run, Hishida, Yamaguchi, and Harada performed as their characters at events and released music under the name Mirage^{2} (stylized as mirage^{2} and pronounced "mirage mirage"). Their first single, "Jan Ken Pon", served as the show's first ending theme song and was first performed at a baton touch event with Magical × Heroine Magimajo Pures!. Ran Ishii later joined the group, debuting in their second single, "Doki Doki" which served as the show's second ending.

On November 17, 2019, the series was renewed for a second broadcast year, as well as a movie.

== Media ==
=== Episodes ===
Secret × Heroine Phantomirage! is broadcast weekly from April 7, 2019, on TV Tokyo at 9:00 AM. Episodes were also uploaded onto Takara Tomy's YouTube channel one week after its original broadcast date, with each new episode available to Japanese residents only for up to one week.

No.	Title	Directed by	Written by	Original release date
1	"I Became a Phantomirage!" "Fantomirāju ni nacchatta!" (ファントミラージュになっちゃった！)	Takashi Miike	Yoichi Kato	April 7, 2019
Kokomi Sakurai encounters Kumachi, a teddy bear on the run from the Gyakugyaku Police. The Gyakugyaku Police turn Kokomi's father, Shinichi, into the Ikanaier Amakunaier, and Kokomi is given the Phantomi Wristy for defying them. With instructions from Phandy, Kumachi's master Kokomi transforms into Phantomi Heart and uses Search Key to locate Shinichi, later purifying his Gyaku Jewel. Kokomi's best friend, Saki Asumi, records the fight and posts it on MeTube, which goes viral. However, Phandy warns Kokomi that she may not reveal her identity to anyone who is not a Secret Heroine.
2	"A Super Trouble For Exposing an Identity!? The Secret Secret Heroines!" "Shōtai Baretara Chō Taihen!? Himitsu no Himitsu Senshi!" (正体バレたら超大変！？ヒミツのひみつ戦士！)	Takashi Miike	Yoichi Kato	April 14, 2019
It is a huge secret from her best friend and PhantomiHeart fan Saki that Kokomi has become a Phantomirage. One day while Saki and her family go into a sushi restaurant, they encounter an Ikanaier Nigiranaiya. A Phantomi Wristy appears to Saki who stands up by herself to protect her family.
3	"Weekly Fumiaki! Phantomi's Identity Exposed!?" "Shūkan Fumiaki! Fantomi no Shōtai, Abakareru!?" (週刊文秋!ファントミの正体、あばかれる！？)	Takashi Miike	Yoichi Kato	April 21, 2019
Kokomi and Saki run away from their classmate who is trying to get a scoop on Phantomirage's identities for his weekly publication. Meanwhile, Fumiaki is "reverse arrested" by the Reverse Police and is transformed into an Ikanaier Abakuya. Their secret will be exposed to everyone, their school is placed into a large panic.
4	"Huge Popularity! The Phantomi Rage has Come!?" "Daininki! Fantomi Būmu ga Kita?!" (大人気！ファントミブームがきた！？)	Yoshitaka Yamaguchi	Yuya Nakazono	April 28, 2019
On the way home from school, Kokomi meets Nanoha and recruit her to be a Phantomirage. When the nursery school teacher Izumi (Suzuka Morita) is turned into an Ikanaier Osewashinaiya as the children play happily, Kokomi transforms into PhantomiHeart to restore smiles safe.
5	"I Want to Be a Phantomi!" "Fantomi ni naritai!" (ファントミになりたい！)	Yoshitaka Yamaguchi	Yoichi Kato	May 5, 2019
Yotsuba from Kokomi and Saki's class next door tells she wants to be a Phantomirage, so the two decide to follow her to figure out why. The shop clerk is turned into an Ikanaier Waribikishinaiya while Yotsuba and her little sister Nanoha are shopping at the supermarket. A Phantomi Wristy appears before Yotsuba protects her sister with her strong will.
6	"Yotsuba's Mother's Day Operation!" "Yotsuba no Haha no Hi Daisakusen!" (ヨツバの母の日大作戦！)	Yoshitaka Yamaguchi	Yuya Nakazono	May 12, 2019
The Phantomirage hold a great strategy meeting to plan a surprise Mother's Day for Yotsuba's mother, Ichiba, who is always busy at work. However, the Reverse Police arrive at the flower store where Yotsuba's mother works and turns her florist into an Ikanaier Sakanaiya, so Yotsuba and the others transform into Phantomirage to save her mother and the florist.
7	"The Magical Heroines Appear!" "Mahō Senshi Arawaru!" (魔法戦士あらわる！)	Kenichiro Nishiumi	Mao Aoki	May 19, 2019
While participating in a community clean-up project, Kokomi witnesses Momoka helping her with magic and locates her with the Search Key to return her hair accessory. The project leader (Yōko Oshima) is turned into the Ikanaier Katazukenaier, who hides and forces the Phantomirage to use the Search Key to find her. Katazukenaier collects a ball of garbage to throw at them, which they stop with the Hand Key and support from the Magimajo Pures. Afterwards, Katazukenaier is purified and the Magimajo Pures secretly entrust the Phantomirage to continue protecting the world.
8	"Take It Back! The Secret Item of Secrets!" "Torimodose! Himitsu no Himitsu Aitemu!" (取り戻せ！ヒミツのひみつアイテム！)	Kenichiro Nishiumi	Mao Aoki	May 26, 2019
As Phandy informs Kokomi that the Secret Items have disappeared, the three Phantomirage go to the hospital where those were last seen. Afterwards, the hospital director is turned into an Ikanaier Shinsatsushinaiya. It is up to the three Phantomirage to recover the secret items and complete taking back the hospital director's heart.
9	"Discovery!? The Fourth Phantomirage!" "Hakken!? Yoninme no Fantomirāju!" (発見！？4人目のファントミラージュ！)	Ryusuke Kurahashi	Kana Matsui	June 2, 2019
While looking for the secret item, the presence of a fourth Phantomi is becoming clearer. When Kokomi and the others follow the clues, where Kani Saraike, a popular MeTuber, is turned into an Ikanaier Ugokitakunaiya.
10	"Saki and the Weather Lady" "Saki to Otenki Onēsan" (サキとお天気お姉さん)	Ryusuke Kurahashi	Kana Matsui	June 9, 2019
Kokomi and the others are looking for PhantomiDiamond and the secret item. Meanwhile, they encounter an Ikanaier Yohoudooriya and Saki notices that the mark on the PhantomiDiamond card is related to the weather lady, which is revealed to be the weather lady the fourth Phantomirage.
11	"Dance Together! The Smile of Dance!" "Issho ni Odoro! Egao no Dansu!" (一緒に踊ろっ！笑顔のダンス！)	Takeshi Yokoi	Yuya Nakazono	June 16, 2019
Kokomi is searching for PhantomiDiamond by using the overflowing melody as a clue. Following where Kokomi can hear the melody, she sees Fuka (Yuzuha Oda) who is dancing in a cool way. When the three girls learn how fun it is to dance thanks to Fuka, she is suddenly turned into an Ikanaier Mou Odorenaiya by the Reverse Police.
12	"Yotsuba's Secret Training!" "Yotsuba, Himitsu no Tokkun!" (ヨツバ、ヒミツの特訓！)	Takeshi Yokoi	Mao Aoki	June 23, 2019
Kokomi and Saki decide to create a Dance Club, but Yotsuba becomes worried because she has no sense of rhythm and is not interest in it, so the latter goes to a drum class. Meanwhile, Art, a foreigner who loves Japanese culture, is turned into an Ikanaier Tatakanaiya. It is up to Yotsuba to take back Art's heart.
13	"Phantomi Dia's Identity!" "Fantomi Daiya no Shōtai!" (ファントミダイヤの正体！)	Yoshitaka Yamaguchi	Yoichi Kato	June 30, 2019
For the last challenge from Phantomi Diamond, Kokomi and the others receive a giant card, where a hint is drawn out which leads them to encounter an Ikenaier Hengaokakuyā at a publishing house. Finally, before their eyes, Phantomi Diamond transforms and reveals her true form.
14	"Let's Be Friends! Chase the Phantomi Dia!" "Nakama ni narō! Fantomi Daiya wo Oe!" (仲間になろう！ファントミダイヤを追え！)	Yoshitaka Yamaguchi	Yoichi Kato	July 7, 2019
Kokomi and the others search for Phantomi Diamond, Seira. On the other hand, Seira is stubborn and persistent about having to work without comrades. Before Kokomi, Saki, and Yotsuba help them, she finds Officer Magyaku along with the Ikenaier Osharesasenaiya and decides to fight it.
15	"The Great Detective vs. Phantomi Dia!" "Meitantei vs. Fantomi Daiya!" (名探偵VSファントミダイヤ！)	Yoshitaka Yamaguchi	Yuya Nakazono	July 14, 2019
Seira and the others work together as a group of four to bring back the Ikenaier Nazotokanaiya's cold hearts. Thinking it is good to have friends, Seira finally approves them, but she seems to have a secret so she goes to the detective agency.
16	"It's Summer! It's a Treasure! It's Gyakugyaku Police's Summer Campaign!" "Natsu da! Otakara da! Gyakugyaku Keisatu Samā Kyanpēn da!" (夏だ！お宝だ！逆逆警察サマーキャンペーンだ！)	Ryusuke Kurahashi	Kana Matsui	July 21, 2019
With Seira joining, the Phantomirage become invincible. However, the Reverse Police suddenly power up with Chief Summer. With Chief Summer announcing the birth of stronger Ikenaiers Hohoemanaiza, Phantomirages seem to be in trouble.
17	"Popularity Explosion! Phantomi Fan's Big Gathering!" "Ninki Bakuhatsu! Fantomi Fan Daishūgō!" (人気爆発！ファントミファン大集合！)	Katsutoshi Hirano	Yuya Nakazono	July 28, 2019
Kokomi encounter some Phantomi fans, who talk about their love of the Phantomi there. The four girls knew everyone's hot feelings, but suddenly, the love of one of the fans became a Mega-Ikenaier, with other fans becoming Petit Ikenaiers Kyouminaiya.
18	"Phantomi! Guest Appearance on TV?!" "Fantomi! Terebi ni Gesuto Shutsuen!?" (ファントミ！テレビにゲスト出演！？)	Ryusuke Kurahashi	Mao Aoki	August 4, 2019
The Phantomirages are asked to appear on TV and decide to decline the request because they were afraid of being uncertain, but only Saki entered the TV station in secret to the other three. When she meets Hidaponta, the host of her favorite TV show, Chief Gyanne turns Ponta into an Ikanaier Kaiketsushinaiya.
19	"Take it back! The Secret Key!" "Chôdai! Himitsu no Akechau Kī!" (ちょーだい！ヒミツのアケチャウキー！)	Katsutoshi Hirano	Yuya Nakazono	August 11, 2019
During summer vacation, the Phantomirages are told by Mr. Phandy that the Secretly Secret Key is hidden in Seira's Phantomi Dial. It is necessary to know what was important to Fantomi in order to get the secret key, but these were the people who were looking for it. Suddenly, Mega Ikenaier Teacher appeared in front of them.
20	"Dodonpa! The Uncool Bon Odori!" "Dodonpa! Ikenai Bon Odori!" (ドドンパ！イケない盆踊り！)	Kenichiro Nishiumi	Kana Matsui	August 18, 2019
Kokomi, Saki, and Seira work hard during the summer vacation, while Yotsuba goes to the Bon Odori Festival at her sister's nursery school. However, Yotsuba's mom is turned into a Petit Ikenaier Ikenaiondoya.
21	"Summer Festival at the end of Summer!" "Natsu no Owari no Samā Fes!" (夏の終わりのサマーフェス！)	Kenichiro Nishiumi	Kana Matsui	August 25, 2019
A summer producer's festival will be held at the end of summer vacation. When the four Phantomirages visited the venue as guests, they found Chief Summer and the Reverse Police there. However, it soon causes a direct confrontation between them.
22	"Big Announcement! Phantomi 10 Big News!" "Dai Happyō! Fantomi 10 Dai Nyūsu!" (大発表！ファントミ10大ニュース！)	Kenichiro Nishiumi	Kana Matsui	September 1, 2019
While returning to Kokomi's sweets cafe, the girls encountered Fumiaki again, who said that he decides to make a special Phantomirage issue for "Weekly Fumiaki" and discuss the details with them.
23	"Teacher Juri! Front Face and Back Face!" "Juri-sensei! Omote no Kao to Ura no Kao!" (ジュリ先生！オモテの顔とウラの顔！)	Takeshi Yokoi	Mao Aoki	September 8, 2019
In the new semester, when Kokomi and the others came back, they found Ume-chan who seemed to be worried at the sweets cafe. Ume-chan tells that he has fallen in love with a regular customer, who turns out to be Juri-sensei from the school. While Kokomi is looking for Mrs. Juri for Ume-chan, the teacher seems to have some secrets.
24	"Gyaku Gyaku Police! Reversely Suddenly Popular!?" "Gyaku Gyaku Keisatsu! Gyaku ni Ikinari Dai-Ninki!?" (逆逆警察！逆にいきなり大人気！？)	Takeshi Yokoi	Mao Aoki	September 15, 2019
Saki is worried that many members of Reverse Police are being picked up on the net. She soon meets an ikenaier Fukunanteiranaiya at the event venue of famous fashion critic Urahara Campe.
25	"I am Sarai! A Grade 5 Student!" "Watashi wa Sarai! Shogaku 5 nensei!" (私はサライ！小学5年生！)	Takashi Miike	Yoichi Kato	September 22, 2019
The Ikenai Power is collected, with the first stage of Sakasama's plan being to make the human race uncool begins. Sarai, a doll made by Sakasama, comes to the Reverse Police. Suddenly, a suspicious man, which is later revealed to be an actor named Jun Oguri, approaches to Kokomi and her friends.
26	"Phanguri-san and PhantomiTime!" "Fanguri-san to Fantomitaimu!" (ファングリさんとファントミタイム！)	Takashi Miike	Yoichi Kato	September 29, 2019
The Phantomirage who has melted away with Sarai's mischief escaped in a crisis. When they come back to the sweets cafe, Jun Oguri is waiting for them again.
27	"The Kizuna Key with no Power" "Chikara no Kieta Kizuna Kī" (力の消えたキズナキー)	Ryusuke Kurahashi	Yoichi Kato	October 6, 2019
It was Phantomi who transformed into the Kizuna Style where they turned many 'Gacchigachi Gyaku Jewels'. However, this important key has been worn out. Phanguri leaves am important letter to the girls. However Ume accidentally handed the letter to the postman's older brother...!!
28	"The Idol is Saki's Treasure!?" "Aidoru wa Saki no Otakara!?" (アイドルはサキのお宝！？)	Ryusuke Kurahashi	Yuya Nakazono	October 13, 2019
In order to regain the power of the 'Kizuna Key', Phantomirage need to find their "Own Treasure". When Saki follows the direction the PhantomiTime leads her, she arrives at a memorable live house. There, she meets her long awaited idol Chika-run.
29	"Search for it! Yotsuba's Clover" "Mitsukete! Yotsuba no Clover" (見つけて！ヨツバのクローバー)	Kenichiro Nishiumi	Mao Aoki	October 20, 2019
Once Saki and Yotsuba found their "Own Treasure", the light of the Phantomi Time brings her into the park. Meanwhile, the Reverse Police turn a young man running in the park into an Ikenaier Hashiranaiya.
30	"Seira and the Phantom Thief with 20 Faces" "Seira to Kaitou Nijuumensō" (セイラと怪盗二十面相)	Katsutoshi Hirano	Mao Aoki	October 27, 2019
In order to search for her "Own Treasure", Seira is led to a Halloween Party by the PhantomiTime. However, there is an Ikenaier Harouinnantekiraiya who is dressed as a Phantom Thief with 20 Faces causing a rampage, so Seira must be quick to the venue to purify his uncool heart.
31	"Kokomi and her Mother's Special Treasure" "Kokomi to Mama no Taisetsuna Takaramono" (ココミとママの大切な宝物)	Takeshi Yokoi	Kana Matsui	November 3, 2019
It is Kokomi's turn to find her "Own Treasure", but what the PhantomiTime showed her was her own home, where her mother is trying to open a treasure chest. Kokomi brings it back inside the Sweets Cafe.
32	"Finally Resurrected! Kizuna Style" "Tsuini Fukkatsu! Kizuna Sutairu" (ついに復活！キズナスタイル)	Takeshi Yokoi	Kana Matsui	November 10, 2019
Kokomi is angry at Sarai for taking her precious hat. Listening to her mother's advice, she decides to be friends with her. However, Kokomi's mother's friend Kinuko is turned into an Ikenaier Iikijidamenisuruya! Will Kokomi be able to safely purify Kinuko's heart?
33	"Kizuna Style with the bond of 4!" "Yonin no Kizuna de Kizuna Sutairu!" (４人の絆でキズナスタイル！)	Kenichiro Nishiumi	Yuya Nakazono	November 17, 2019
The four Phantomi have safely retrieved Kizuna Style, but SakaSama is about to start a new plan. The locksmith who visited the sweets cafe is turned into an Ikenaier Kagishimechauya!! The locksmith bothers everyone and throws the town into panic! Kokomi, can you take back the locksmiths uncool heart?
34	"The Targeted Phantomi Pendant!" "Nerawareta Fantomi Pendanto!" (ねらわれたファントミペンダント！)	Katsutoshi Hirano	Mao Aoki	November 24, 2019
Kokomi ended up losing her Phantomi Pendant. And because of it, Phandy gets into a panic because the "Ikenai Box" has sealed a lot of bad power. The 4 pendants can open the box!! Are Kokomi and the others able to protect the pendants?
35	"Sarai's Uncool Mischief!" "Sarai no Ikenai Itazura" (サライのイケないイタズラ！)	Ryusuke Kurahashi	Kana Matsui	December 1, 2019
Sarai has opened the "Ikenai Box", and the uncool power has spread out across the world! Because of it, a lot of Ikenai dolls have been created from that power! The doll Ikenaiers Hirojanaiya will do something bad across the entire city!!
36	"Dark Sarai! The Dark 5th Grader!" "Dark Sarai! Yami no Shougaku 5-nensei!" (ダークサライ！闇の小学５年生！)	Takeshi Yokoi	Yuya Nakazono	December 8, 2019
Kokomi and the others fight the Doll Ikenaiers but Sarai ends up learning that she is a doll! With that, Sarai powers up into Dark Sarai, the dark 5th grader! In order to save Sarai, Kokomi and the others must use Kizuna Style!!
37	"A Non-Christmas!" "Kurisumasu Nakushimasu!" (クリスマスなくしマス！)	Ryusuke Kurahashi	Yoichi Kato	December 15, 2019
Becoming stronger, Dark Sarai transforms into Santa Style! The lights on the Christmas tree disappear one after the other. Can Phantomirage bring back the fun of Christmas and return Sarai's smile?
38	"A Red and White Phantomi Battle!" "Kouhaku Fantomi Gassen!" (紅白ファントミ合戦！)	Kenichiro Nishiumi	Mao Aoki	December 22, 2019
Kokomi and the others are going to upload "A Red and White Phantomi Battle" onto MeTube! The four are fighting against each other with quizzes about Phantomi!! Who will win, the red team or the white team?
39	"Found it! The Secret of the Bond!" "Kizuna no Himitsu! Mitsuketa!" (キズナのヒミツ！み～つけた！)	Katsutoshi Hirano	Yuya Nakazono	December 29, 2019
One day, Sarai who has been turned into a "Real 5th Grader" has come to Kokomi and the others with her treasure. Sarai's treasure is a picture diary filled with fun memories created with the Phantomi!
40	"New Treasure! Phantomi Perfume" "Aratana Otakara! Fantomi Pafyuumu" (新たなお宝！ファントミパフューム！)	Takeshi Yokoi	Yoichi Kato	January 12, 2020
Phandy has a wonderful announcement for Phantomirage whose popularity has been gradually increasing! With the Gyaku Jewel's that they've retrieved, with the large announcement they've announced they've created a new treasure! What is this treasure?
41	"Let's Start! Everyone's Dance Club" "Hajimeyou! Minna no Dansubu" (はじめよう！みんなのダンス部)	Takeshi Yokoi	Mao Aoki	January 19, 2020
One day, Kokomi meets her senior, Suita, who is practicing the horn. They seem to be upset because they're not improving. But, they're turned into an Ikenaier by the Reverse Police! Can the Phantomirage bring back the senior who loves music?
42	"Saki and Chihiro's Spiriting Away!?" "Saki to Chihiro no Kamikakushi!?" (サキとちひろの神隠し！？)	Ryusuke Kurahashi	Kana Matsui	January 26, 2020
Saki won the autograph session of her favorite anime director and was delighted! At the sign event, she encounters Chihiro, an enthusiastic fan. However, the director has become an Ikenaier! Will Saki who has transformed into a Phantomirage be able to rescue the director with the power of the fans?
43	"Anime Special! Save the Lost Saki!" "Anime Supesharu! Mayoeru Saki wo Sukue!" (アニメスペシャル！迷えるサキを救え！)	Hiroshi Matsumoto	Kana Matsui	February 2, 2020
In order to help Saki who has suddenly turned into an anime, Kokomi, Yotsuba and Seira must transform and go to the anime world! There, they meet the sun, Sun Sun, who has turned into an Ikenaier! Can Kokomi and the others save Saki, and can all 4 return to their original form?
44	"Kokomi and her Dad's Valentine!" "Kokomi to papa no barentain!" (ココミとパパのバレンタイン)	Takeshi Yokoi	Mao Aoki	February 9, 2020
As Valentines Day approaches, the Sweets Cafe becomes busy! Just then, Kokomi's dad returns from his trip! Kokomi and her dad arrive at the research institute with the Phantom Cacao that he found, but an Ikenaier is there! Can Kokomi transform and take back the cool heart without revealing her identity to her dad?
45	"Fumiaki Weekly! Phantomi's Secret Special Issue!" "Shuukan Fumiaki! Fantomi no Himitsu Tokubetsugou!" (週刊文秋！ファントミのひみつ特別号！)	Kenichiro Nishiumi	Yuya Nakazono	February 16, 2020
Eager to cover a big scoop of the rising in popularity Phantomirage, a legendary reporter appears before Kokomi and the other's classmate, Fumiaki! Fumiaki begins a special training where he must find the most precious spirit.
46	"Chase after the Reverse Police's Mystery!" "Gyaku Gyaku Keisatsu no Nazo wo Oe!" (逆逆警察のナゾを追え！)	Kenichiro Nishiumi	Yuya Nakazono	February 23, 2020
One day, Sarai comes into the Sweets Cafe with her best friend, Asahi. Asahi is the younger sister of Fumiaki, and like her brother, she wants to investigate the secrets of the Reverse Police in order to become a reporter. Despite Seira's warning that it is a difficult thing to cover, Asahi approaches Officer Magyaku!
47	"The Phantomi Perfume's Secret" "Fantomi Pafyuumu no Himitsu!" (ファントミパフュームのヒミツ！)	Takeshi Yokoi	Mao Aoki	March 1, 2020
Kokomi and the other's classmate Fumiaki has debuted as a Metuber! The four use the secret key to check out his shoot. Fumiaki thoroughly interviews the Phantomi fans and soon, they will get closer to the secret of the Phantomi perfumes!
48	"Sarai Found what she was Looking for!" "Sarai no Sagashimono Mitsuketa!" (サライの探し物見つけた!)	Katsutoshi Hirano	Mao Aoki	March 8, 2020
Yotsuba's little sister, Nanoha, is upset that she has lost her doll. Yotsuba and Sarai head out to find Nanoha's doll and encounter a woman. The woman is Erika, the one who owned Sarai when she was a doll.
49	"The Chaotic Spring Dance Camp" "Haru no Hacha Mecha Dansu Gasshaku!" (春のはちゃめちゃダンス合宿！)	Kenichiro Nishiumi	Yuya Nakazono	March 15, 2020
It has been decided that Kokomi and the others will make an appearance at the Girls Dance Contest that Ms Juri applied for! In order to aim for the victory, the four have begun practicing at a dance camp under the suggestion of Ms Juri. But once they reached the camp, there was a certain monk.
50	"Declaration of Rivalry!? The Strongest Duo Make their Appearance!" "Raibaru Sengen! Saikyou Dansu Conbi Toujou!" (ライバル宣言！？最強ダンスコンビ登場！)	Takanobu Harashima	Kana Matsui	March 22, 2020
The strongest duo, Manami and Kanami, suddenly before Kokomi and the others who were practicing for the contest and declare themselves rivals! Later, Kokomi and Saki see the two out of breath. It seems like Kanami has a secret she can't tell Manami.
51	"Aim to Win! Girls Dance Contest!" "Mezase Yūshō! Gāruzu Dansu Kontesuto!" (めざせ優勝！ガールズダンスコンテスト！)	Ryusuke Kurahashi	Kana Matsui	March 29, 2020
The day of the Girls Dance Contest is finally here! Kokomi talks with Rurie, from another dance team, who looks nervous, to try to encourage her. Meanwhile, Rurie's dad turns into an Ikenaier and goes on a rampage! Will the contest be held safely, so everyone can enjoy dancing?
52	"The Time has Come! SakaSama's Appearance!" "Toki wa kita! Sakasama ga arawareru!" (時は来た！サカサーマあらわる！)	Takeshi Yokoi	Yoichi Kato	April 5, 2020
SakaSama has ordered the Reverse Police to infiltrate the girls school! The girls' classmate Ai who is a big Phantomi fan has turned into an ikenaier! Can Phantomirage help their friend without revealing their identities?
53	"The Reverse Police Approaches! Phantomi's Danger!" "Semaru gyaku gyaku keisatsu! Fantomi no pinchi!" (迫る逆逆警察！ファントミのピンチ！)	Takeshi Yokoi	Yuya Nakazono	April 12, 2020
The Reverse Police has arrived at Kokomi's school, searching everywhere to uncover the identity of the Phantomirage. They meet and reverse arrest Yuko! Now, Seira works together with Julie to save her!
54	"Finally Revealed!? Phantomi's Identity!" "Tsui ni Bareta!? Fantomi no Shoutai!" (ついにバレた!?ファントミの正体！)	Katsutoshi Hirano	Mao Aoki	April 19, 2020
The Reverse Police go to the Sweets Cafe to wait for the Phantomirage but table tennis player, Mai, is turned into an Ikenaier! Kokomi and Saki transform into Phantomirage to play table tennis!? And, will Saki's identity finally be revealed?
55	"I've Turned into Popcorn!" "Poppucon ni Nachatta!" (ポップコーンになっちゃった！)	Ryusuke Kurahashi	Kana Matsui	April 26, 2020
Saki has turned into popcorn after her identity was revealed. In order to return Saki back, Kokomi and the others must find the "Mod Salt". Meanwhile, an Ikenaier has appeared in the park creating big panic! Will the Phantomirage be able to rescue the Ikenaier and find the "Mod Salt"?
56	"Tell us Sarai! The Reverse Police's Secret!" "Oshiete Sarai! Gyaku Gyaku Keisatsu no Himitsu!" (教えてサライ！逆逆警察のひみつ！)	Takanobu Harashima	Kana Matsui	May 3, 2020
Saki is unable to return from being popcorn. Kokomi and the others need to think of another method to save her, so they go to Sarai, who is familiar with the Reverse Police, to receive detailed special lessons about them! But at the Sweets Cafe, there is a mysterious woman.
57	"Phantomi Queen Is Back!" "Kaette kita Fantomi Kuiin!" (帰ってきたファントミクイーン！)	Katsutoshi Hirano	Yoichi Kato	May 10, 2020
The mysterious woman is a former Phantomirage!? The mysterious woman tells them about the "Modosana Caramel" at the movie theatre, but Meru is turned into an Ikenaier Poppushinaiya! Can Phantomirage save Meru and retrieve the Modosana Caramel?
58	"Heart-Pounding Infiltration! Reverse Police!" "Dokidoki Sennyu! Gyaku Gyaku Kesiatsu!" (ドキドキ潜入！逆逆警察！)	Ryusuke Kurahashi	Yoichi Kato	May 17, 2020
Phantomirage and Amigo succeed in sneaking into the Reverse Police's hideout to regain the Modosana Caramel. However, the infiltration was discovered by Magyaku. Finally, a direct confrontation with the Reverse Police is about to begin!
59	"Chief Gyanne's Secret!" "Gyannu Shochou no Himitsu!" (ギャンヌ署長のひみつ！)	Ryusuke Kurahashi	Yuya Nakazono	May 24, 2020
After witnessing Magyakku regain his dream, Chief Gyanne decides to regain her own dream too. However, Chief Gyanne is turned into an Ikenaier Yumenantekanawanaiya by Sakasama. Can Seira, who was at the scene, be able to take back Chief Gyanne's uncool heart?
60	"Secret Teller Chocolate!" "Himitsu Oshiete Chokoreeto!" (ヒミツ教えてチョコレート！)	Takeshi Yokoi	Mao Aoki	May 31, 2020
Kokomi's dad Shinichi has turned into an AQ Ikenaier. Though unknown to Kokomi, she confronts Detective Abekobe. Will this be the Phantomirage's decisive battle with the Reverse Police?
61	"SakaSaama Decisive Battle! The Last Fight!" "Kessen Sakasaama! Saigou no Tatakai" (決戦サカサーマ！ 最後の戦い！)	Takeshi Yokoi	Yoichi Kato	June 7, 2020
Finally, it's the direct confrontation of Phantomirage and SakaSama. They are in a huge pinch, SakaSama has powered up with the AQ Ikenaier, Shinichi's "Power-Up-ple Pie"! What to do, Phantomirage?
62	"Phandy's Final Order" "Fandi san Saigo no Shirei!?" (ファンディーさん最後の指令！？)	Katsutoshi Hirano	Yuya Nakazono	June 14, 2020
Phantomirage have taken back SakaSama's uncool heart. And, while Kokomi and the others look back on their activities so far, Phandy gives them their final order. Their task isn't over yet?
63	"Phantomirage is Forever♪" "Fantomiraaju wa Eien ni" (ファントミラージュは永遠に♪)	Ryusuke Kurahashi	Kana Matsui	June 21, 2020
Kokomi and the others look for the answers to Phandy's last order. At that time, Fumiaki is holding a Phantomi revival signature event. Thanks to Fumiaki and themselves who have found the answer. What is the answer?
64	"Phantomi's Graduation Ceremony of Tears" "Fantomi Namida no Sotsugyou Shiki" (ファントミナミダの卒業式)	Ryusuke Kurahashi	Mao Aoki	June 28, 2020
Phantomirage clear Phandy's final order and are able to transform into Phantomirage again. But, the four need to graduate as Phantomirage. The tearful graduation ceremony of the four who have grown is about to begin.

=== Soundtrack ===
Throughout the series' run, the main cast released music as their characters under the group name Mirage² (pronounced "Mirage Mirage"). Following the reveal of Ran Ishii's character, Seira, she was added to the group on June 13, 2020. The group officially ended activities in June 2020, however, they made an appearance at Momoiro Uta Gassen on December 31, 2020, as part of the white team.

==== Albums ====
Title	Year	Album details	Peak chart positions		Sales
Title	Year	Album details	JPN	JPN Hot	Sales
MIRAGE☆BEST -mirage² Complete Best-	2020	Released: June 24, 2020; Label: Sony Music Entertainment Japan; Formats: CD, digital download	TBA	TBA	TBA
"—" denotes releases that did not chart or were not released in that region.

==== Extended plays ====
Title	Year	Album details	Peak chart positions		Sales
Title	Year	Album details	JPN	JPN Hot	Sales
Kiseki (キセキ)	2019	Released: December 25, 2019; Label: Sony Music Entertainment Japan; Formats: CD, digital download	8	TBA	TBA
"—" denotes releases that did not chart or were not released in that region.

==== Singles ====
Title	Year	Peak chart positions		Sales	Album
Title	Year	JPN	JPN Hot	Sales	Album
"Jan Ken Pon" (じゃん☆けん☆ぽん)	2019	8	—	TBA	TBA
"Doki Doki" (ドキ☆ドキ)	2019	7	—	TBA	TBA
"Saite-Saite" (咲いて^{2})	2020	4	—	TBA	TBA
"Arukidasou" (歩き出そう)	2020	6	—	TBA	TBA
"—" denotes releases that did not chart or were not released in that region.

=== Film ===
On November 17, 2019, a theatrical film titled Secret × Heroine Phantomirage! The Movie: We'Ve Become A Movie was announced. The film's theme song is "ABCDEF Girl" by Girls² and the remaining five members of the girl group made a cameo appearance. Kizuna Perfume was distributed as a theater gift. The movie was originally scheduled to be released on July 23, 2020. The film grossed a cumulative total of ¥95,246,200.

=== Other media appearances ===
The May 2019 issue of Pucchigumi, which was released on April 4, 2019, came with a Collab Pri Ticket for Kiratto Pri☆Chan arcade game machines containing Kokomi's Phantomirage uniform to use for the playable characters. As part of their summer collaboration with Kiratto Pri☆Chan, Seira's Phantomirage uniform was available for the arcade game beginning July 11, 2019 as their third collaboration jewel coordinate event. The September 2019 issue of Pucchigumi, released on August 1, 2019, also came with a Collab Pri Ticket featuring Seira's Phantomirage uniform for Kiratto Pri☆Chan arcade game machines.
