= Magical × Heroine Magimajo Pures! =

Japanese television drama series

- Promotional visual for the second half of the series
- 魔法×戦士 マジマジョピュアーズ!
- Genre: Tokusatsu, Magical girl, children
- Created by: TOMY; OLM
- Written by: Hisako Fujihira; Kana Matsui; Mao Aoki; Yuya Nakazono
- Directed by: Takashi Miike; Kenshi Yokoi; Ryusuke Kurahashi; Kenichiro Nishiumi; Hideyuki Yamamoto
- Starring: Yuki Miyoshi; Momoka Sumitani; Misaki Tsuruya; Youka Ogawa; Kurea Masuda; Mariko Shinoda
- Opening theme: "Ai ni Tsuite" by Magical² (eps. 1-14); "Ai ni Tsuite (Powered Up Version)" by Magical² (eps. 15-26); "Mirumiru: Mirai Mieru" by Magical² (eps. 27-51)
- Ending theme: "Chō Lucky" by Magical² (eps. 1-14); "Harerusa" by Magical² (eps. 15-26); "OK" by Magical² (eps. 27-39); "Thank You" by Magical² (eps. 40-51)
- Composer: Koji Endo
- Country of origin: Japan
- Original language: Japanese
- No. of episodes: 51

Production
- Producers: Sayako Muramatsu; Yosuke Imai; Misako Saka
- Running time: 24 minutes

Original release
- Network: TV Tokyo
- Release: April 1, 2018 – March 24, 2019

Related
- Idol × Warrior Miracle Tunes!; Secret × Heroine Phantomirage!

Magical × Heroine Magimajo Pures (魔法×戦士 マジマジョピュアーズ!, Mahō Senshi Majimajo Pyuāzu!) is a Japanese television drama series that began airing on April 1, 2018, until March 24, 2019. It is the second installment of the Girls × Heroine Series produced by Takara Tomy and OLM, Inc. with the assistance of Shogakukan and EXPG Studio, following the success of Idol × Warrior Miracle Tunes! The show is aimed at a female demographic between the ages of 2 and 6. The series stars Yuki Miyoshi, Momoka Sumitani, Misaki Tsuruya, Youka Ogawa, and Kurea Masuda. The plot is centered on the Magimajo Pures, a group of middle school girls who transform into Magical Heroines to protect people's dreams from the Nuisance World.

The show also launched a brief singing career for the main cast, who are holding music activities as the Japanese idol girl group Magical² to promote the show. Following the show's end in 2019, it was succeeded by Secret × Heroine Phantomirage!

== Plot ==
In an attempt to conquer the world, the Nuisance World has stolen the magical gemstones called Majoka Jewels (マジョカジュエル) and have corrupted each into a dark-possessed crystal, an Akirame Stone (あきらめストーン), which interferes with people's dreams and turns them into a dark, villainous Akiramest (アキラメスト). Momoka, an ordinary middle school student, is summoned by Mokonyan, a fairy from the Magical World, to join Magical Heroines Rin and Mitsuki and stop the Nuisance World. Together, as Magimajo Pures, they purelize the Akiramests back into Majoka Jewels with magic.

== Characters ==
=== Magimajo Pures ===
The main characters are first-year middle school students who transform into group of magical girls, Magimajo Pures using a Majoka Porte and their own Majoka Jewels. Each girl is given a magic wand called a Majoka Lumina and using different Majoka Jewels would allow them to cast spells that they can use with Majoka Porte to defeat their enemies. As the series goes on, their Majoka Jewels upgraded into a Royal Jewels, allow them to transform into Royal Mode. Originally starting with Momoka, Rin and Mitsuki they are joined by a now-purified Shiori and later by Yuria.

Momoka Aino (愛乃モモカ, Aino Momoka)
Played by Yuki Miyoshi
Momoka is the pink-colored Heart Magical Heroine who holds the Heart Ruby (ハートルビー, Hāto Rubī) as her Majoka Jewel. She is a bright and energetic first-year middle school student who is full of dreams. Her Majoka Jewel allows her to purify people's hearts. Her catchphrase is "That's magical!" Her solo purelize move is "Heartful Lovely Party".
Rin Shirayuki (白雪リン, Shirayuki Rin)
Played by Momoka Sumitani
Rin is the blue-colored Frozen Magical Heroine who holds the Frozen Sapphire (フローズンサファイア, Furōzun Safaia) as her Majoka Jewel. Originally from the Magical World, she holds excellent grades and enjoys reading. Her Majoka Jewel allows her to freeze items and calm people down. Her catchphrase is "How mysterious!" Her solo purelize move is "Frozen Cool Splash".
Mitsuki Hanamori (花守ミツキ, Hanamori Mitsuki)
Played by Misaki Tsuruya
Mitsuki is the yellow-colored Flower Magical Heroine who holds the Flower Citrine (フラワーシトリン, Furawā Shitorin) as her Majoka Jewel. Originally from the Magical World, her love of sports allows her to become talented in that area, and, as a result, she is sought after by many school clubs. Her Majoka Jewel allows her to make people feel energetic. Her catchphrase is "Happy flower circles!" Her solo purelize move is "Flower Blossom Carnival".
Shiori Hoshina (星奈シオリ, Hoshina Shiori)
Played by Youka Ogawa
Shiori is mysterious Magical Heroine manipulated by Jamahiko. After being rescued by the Magimajo Pures, she is revealed to be the purple-colored Star and Moon Magical Heroine who holds the Star Amethyst (スターアメジスト, Sutā Amejisuto) as her Majoka Jewel. In her daily life, she is a stylish girl who enjoys fashion. Partnered with Lalanyan, Shiori uses the Majoka Palette (マジョカパレット) to transform. Her Majoka Jewel allows her to fires their enemies with starlight beams. Her solo purelize move is "Stardust Cosmic".
Yuria Nijiiro (虹色ユリア, Nijiiro Yuria)
Played by Kurea Masuda
Yuria is the rainbow-colored Rainbow Magical Heroine who holds the Rainbow Diamond (レインボーダイヤモンド, Reinbō Daiyamondo) as her Majoka Jewel. She holds the spirit of the unicorn and uses powerful magic. She came to Earth to protect the other four girls. Yuria uses the Majoka Iris (マジョカアイリス) to transform and it holds the powers of all the Majoka Jewels. Her Majoka Jewel allows her to create protective barriers. She is shy, but has a healing personality. Her solo purelize move is "Rainbow Milky Fantasy".

=== Magical World ===
Tiara (ティアラ)
Played by Mariko Shinoda
Tiara is the owner of Tiara, a jewelry shop. She is from the Magical World who acts as the guardian between both worlds, and uses a crystal ball to observe affairs from afar, aside from providing the magic to allow the Magimajo Pures to transform.
Mokonyan (モコニャン)
Voiced by: Sakura Ando
A pink, cat-like fairy from the Magical World who is partnered with Momoka, Rin, and Mitsuki. She is always drinking Majoka Milk and eating fish-shaped cookies. She ends her sentences with the word "nyan".
Lalanyan (ララニャン, Raranyan)
Voiced by: Izumi Okamura
A cat-like fairy from the Magical World who is partnered with Shiori. When entering Jama World, she got separated from Shiori and was held captive.

=== Jama World ===
The residents of Jama World (邪魔界, Jamakai; Nuisance World) are the antagonists of the series who take away peoples' dreams while turning them into Akiramests (アキラメスト, Akiramesto), converting their Purella Energy into negativity-inducing Jakura Energy.

Jama Baron (邪魔男爵, Jama Danshaku)
Played by Kenichi Endō
The leader of Jama World who stole the Majoka Jewels from the Magical World, using the Jamajama-dan to take away people's dreams. Following his death when the Giving Up Thunderzooka he was using self-destructed, he returns in the finale arc as Jama the Great (邪魔大帝, Jama Taitei).
Jamahiko (邪魔彦)
Played by Kanata Hosoda
Jama Baron's apparent son, Jamahiko takes charge of the Jamajama-dan after usurping his father. After brainwashing Shiori, he later attends Yumenokaze Middle School disguised as Masahiko Makabe (真加部正彦, Makabe Masahiko). Yuria reveals that he was a human boy kidnapped and brainwashed by Gran Ma, disappearing after the Magi Majo Pures purelize him before he resurfaces during the Magimajo Pures' final battle with Jama the Great.
Gran Ma (グラン魔)
Played by Kumiko Mori
Gran Ma is Jama Baron's mother and Jamahiko's grandmother. She leads the Jamajama-dan into stealing the Majoka Jewels after Jamahiko disappears before eloping with Santa Claus.

==== Jamajama-dan ====
The Jamajama-dan (邪魔邪魔団) are three Deluxe Akiramests who turn others into Akiramests with the Akirame Stones.

Muritaro (ムリ太郎, Muritarō)
Played by Louis Kurihara
A rabbit-themed man who wears black clothes and ties his hair back, later revealed to be formerly a failing comedian who gave up his dream.
Mudako (ムダ子)
Played by Akosuya Miki
The only woman on the team, bear-themed with an afro and red clothes.
Damenojo (ダメ之丞, Damenojō)
Played by Osamu Fujiki
A gorilla-themed man with dreadlocks wearing a frog-like hat and white clothes, later revealed to formerly a sweets shop apprentice.

=== Recurring characters ===
Ririka Aino (愛乃 梨々花, Aino Ririka)
Played by Eriko Sato
Ririka is Momoka's mother and also used to be a Magical Heroine.
Hideo Omachi (大町 秀雄, Ōmachi Hideo)
Played by Yūta Watanabe
Mr. Omachi is the teacher of Momoka, Rin, and Mitsuki's class at Yumenokaze Middle School.
Kaito Odawara (小田原 カイト, Odawara Kaito)
Played by Kyōhei Shimokawa
Kaito is Momoka's classmate and is in the art club with Rin. His mother is Marin Odawara, the creator of Rin's favorite manga series, Super Spy Vanilla Dessert. His dream is to become a manga artist.
Moe Nakahara (中原 萌, Nakahara Moe)
Played by Hinata Arakawa
Moe is Momoka's classmate and is part of the school newspaper's staff with her. Her dream is to become a ballerina.
Nanami Hirano (平野 菜々美, Hirano Nanami)
Played by Kanon Matsuzawa
Nanami is Momoka's classmate and is in the tennis team with Mitsuki.
Teruki Koike (小池 輝樹, Koike Teruki)
Played by Fūto Takahashi
Teruki is a third year student who Rin has feelings for. He is part of the soccer team and was also elected as student council president. His dream is to become a soccer player.

== Production ==
Following Idol × Warrior Miracle Tunes!, Magimajo Pures! is the second installment of the Girls × Heroine series to have Takashi Miike as general director. The title was trademarked on November 21, 2017. The cast members were chosen from TV Drama Girls Audition in the summer of 2017. The series' name and cast members Yuki Miyoshi, Momoka Sumitani, and Misaki Tsuruya, were first announced on during the show's debut showcase on January 30, 2018. Youka Ogawa was later announced as a cast member in June 2018, while Kurea Masuda was revealed as the final cast member on August 25, 2018. The dances are choreographed by EXPG Studio. Prior to being cast, Momoka Sumitani, Youka Ogawa, and Kurea Masuda were part of EXPG Studio's female U-14 trainee group, Kizzy.

A toy line was produced by Takara Tomy, featuring magical items, accessories, and costumes from the show. The show was advertised with the catchphrase, "Open the Majoka World! Purelize with sparkling magic!!" (オープン・ザ・マジョカワールド！きらめく魔法でピュアライズ！！)

During the show's run, Yuki Miyoshi, Momoka Sumitani, Misaki Tsuruya, Youka Ogawa, and Kurea Masuda performed as their characters at events and released music under the name Magical² (stylized as magical² and pronounced "magical magical"). The first opening theme song, "Ai ni Tsuite", was first performed at Miracle²'s final concert tour in March 2018. Along with performing songs featured in the show, Magical² also performed "Fure Fure", the theme song for Alvark Tokyo for their 2018–2019 basketball season.

== Media ==
=== Episodes ===
Magical × Heroine Magimajo Pures! was broadcast weekly from April 1, 2018, on TV Tokyo at 9:00 AM and BS TV Tokyo at 10:00 AM. Episodes were also uploaded onto Takara Tomy's YouTube channel one week after its original broadcast date, with each new episode available worldwide for up to one week. Episodes were also screened with English subtitles under the name Magical × Heroine Magimajo Pures! at Chara Expo USA 2018.

Asaka Uchida, Suzuka Adachi, Yuzuha Oda, Rina Usukura, and Mio Nishiyama reprised their roles from Idol × Warrior Miracle Tunes! in episode 6. Sasuke Ohtsuru and Takumi also reprised their roles from Idol × Warrior Miracle Tunes! in episode 16.

No.	Title	Directed by	Written by	Original release date
1	"The Birth of the Magical Heroines, Magimajo Pures!" "Mahō Senshi Majimajo Pyuāzu! Tanjō" (魔法戦士マジマジョピュアーズ！誕生)	Takashi Miike	Hisako Fujihira	April 1, 2018
On her first day of school, Momoka witnesses Rin and Mitsuki fighting an Akiramest and meets Mokonyan, who leads her to Tiara. After Momoka receives a Majoka Porte, Muritaro turns Moe's ballet teacher (Akina Minami) into an Akiramest, Murimurina. Momoka joins Rin and Mitsuki by transforming and defeating her, recovering the Float Topaz (フワフワトパーズ, Fuwafuwa Topāzu).
2	"Magic Lessons, Start!" "Mahō Ressun Sutāto!" (魔法レッスンスタート！)	Takashi Miike	Hisako Fujihira	April 8, 2018
Momoka learns about the Magical World and practices using the Float Topaz. At school, Mudako turns third-year Teruki of the school's soccer team into the Akiramest Yarukineriga. Momoka uses the Float Topaz to stop his attack before the Magimajo Pures purelize him, recovering the Reality Garnet (ホンモノガーネット, Honmono Gānetto).
3	"Turning the Manga World into Reality!?" "Manga no Sekai ga Honmono ni!?" (まんがの世界がホンモノに!?)	Kenshi Yokoi	Kana Matsui	April 15, 2018
Rin finds out that Kaito's mother, Marin Odawara (Ryoko Yuui), is the author of her favorite manga series, Super Spy Vanilla Dessert. He invites her to his house to meet her, but Damenojo turns Marin into the Akiramest Yatterareka. Rin is reluctant to hurt her, but Momoka uses the Reality Garnet to bring forth a weapon from Marin's manga, which is used to defeat her. The Magimajo Pures purelize her, recovering the Lovely Opal (ラブリーオパール, Raburī Opāru).
4	"Heart-pounding! Momoka Purelizes By Herself!" "Dokidoki! Momoka Hitori de Pyuaraizu!" (ドキドキ！モモカひとりでピュアライズ！)	Kenshi Yokoi	Mao Aoki	April 22, 2018
Momoka decides to join the Newspaper Club, after which Muritaro turns a police officer into the Akiramest Futodokimon. With everyone else busy with school clubs, Momoka fights Futodokimon alone despite her weak magic. Determining to save the police officer, she purelizes him, recovering the Speech Garnet (オシャベリガーネット, Oshaberi Gānetto).
5	"Happy Flower Circles with the Magic of Flowers!" "Ohana no Mahō de Happī Hana Maru!" (お花の魔法でハッピー花マル！)	Ryusuke Kurahashi	Mao Aoki	April 29, 2018
Mudako turns a guitarist (Erica Tonooka) into the Akiramest Yakamashi, and convinces her that no one will enjoy her music. Momoka uses the Speech Garnet on her guitar and convinces the guitarist not to give up. The Magi Majo Pures purelize her, recovering the Speed Emerald (スピードエメラルド, Supīdo Emerarudo).
6	"Miracle² Have Arrived!" "Mirakuru Mirakuru ga Yattekita!" (ミラクルミラクルがやって来た！)	Kenshi Yokoi	Kana Matsui	May 6, 2018
Miracle² is invited to lead Momoka's physical education class. Muritaro turns Sara, a classmate who dreams of becoming an idol, into the Akiramest Muricle². While Miracle² supports them in secret, the Magimajo Pures defeat her in a dance and song battle with the Speed Emerald, recovering the Big Aquamarine (ビッグアクアマリン, Biggu Akuamarin).
7	"Achieve the Dream! A Heated Election" "Yume wo Kachitore! Atsui Senkyō" (夢を勝ち取れ！アツ〜い選挙)	Kenichiro Nishiumi	Kana Matsui	May 13, 2018
Rin gets roped into helping out Machiko Nagata (Nana Mori), an excitable third year student running for student council president. Mudako turns Nagata into the Akiramest Monkuarukaicho. Rin uses the Big Aquamarine to amplify her voice and defeat her, recovering the Invisible Ametrine (トーメイアメトリン, Tōmei Ametorin). Nagata loses to Teruki, but she remains passionate about helping out the school.
8	"A Great Battle with the Jama Baron!" "Jama Danshaku to Daisakusen!" (邪魔男爵と大決戦！)	Kenichiro Nishiumi	Hisako Fujihira	May 20, 2018
The Jama Baron's son, Jamahiko, gives the Jama Baron a bazooka that will destroy the world. The Magimajo Pures approach him and use the Invisible Ametrine to elude his attacks, but they fail to purelize him. The Jama Baron uses the bazooka, but he discovers it has been rigged and it explodes on him. Meanwhile, Jamahiko usurps his throne with his servant, Shiori.
9	"The Mysterious Girl, Shiori" "Nazo no Shōjo Shiori" (謎の少女 シオリ)	Hideyuki Yamamoto	Mao Aoki	May 27, 2018
While Shiori is on a date with Muritaro, she turns Kaoru (Ryoko Kobayashi), a nail artist, into the Akiramest Mendokusain. Mitsuki, who had planned on visiting the salon, battles her and uses the Fashion Aquamarine (オシャレアクアマリン, Oshare Akuamarin) to remind her of the excitement she felt from helping others look their best. She purelizes her and recovers the Laughing Tourmaline (ゲラゲラトルマリン, Geragera Torumarin).
10	"Laughing Showdown! Laugh and You Lose" "Waratte Kaiketsu! Kyōiku Jisshū" (笑って解決！教育実習)	Hideyuki Yamamoto	Mao Aoki	June 3, 2018
Momoka's class gets a student teacher, Naoto Sato (Yuki Morinaga), who makes terrible jokes to compensate for his shyness. Mudako turns him into the Akiramest Kudaranessu. Momoka uses the Change Tanzanite and the Laughing Tourmaline to distract the teachers under Kudaranessu's control and purelizes him, recovering the Bubble Quartz (バブルクォーツ, Baburu Kuōtsu). Shiori, who had been observing from afar, decides to approach Momoka.
11	"Mitsuki's Smash! Aiming to be the Ace" "Mitsuki no Sumasshu! Ēsu wo Nerae" (ミツキのスマッシュ！エースをねらえ)	Kenshi Yokoi	Kana Matsui	June 10, 2018
Tiara tells the three girls that there is a warrior with the Star and Moon power. Listening, Mitsuki begins to worry about Shiori. The next day, Momoka goes to a tennis match where she will support Mitsuki who is participating. After Momoka meets Shiori and befriends her, Mitsuki's opponent Midoriko Chōno is turned into an Akiramest Zetsubou Fujin in the stadium. Momoka and Rin hurry to the venue to Pure Rise the Akiramest and recover the Sneezing Ametrine (くしゃみアメトリン, Kushami Ametorin).
12	"The Targeted Heart Ruby" "Nerawareta Hāto Rubī" (狙われたハートルビー)	Kenichiro Nishiumi	Kana Matsui	June 17, 2018
Momoka is searching for her new friend Shiori's necklace, Shiori didn't search because it would take a lifetime to search for it. However, it was all a lie because Shiori is secretly aiming for Momoka's heart ruby. Rin is concerned about Momoka searching for it but due to excessive worrying she breaks out with a flu the next day. When Rin visits the hospital she meets nurse Naoko Shirai who has been turned into an Akiramest Tsukarerushi. Rin uses the Sneezing Ametrine to make her sneeze. She purelizes her and recovers the Karukaru Tourmaline (カルカルトルマリン, Karukaru Torumarin).
13	"A New Magical Heroine Appears!?" "Arata na Mahō Senshi Tōjō!?" (新たな魔法戦士登場!?)	Hideyuki Yamamoto	Mao Aoki	June 24, 2018
After Momoka gives her a friendship bracelet, Shiori turns a firefighter (Suzunosuke) into the Akiramest Kowagari. Momoka uses the Heavy Tourmaline and the Light Tourmaline to stop him, purelizing him to recover the Bye Bye Emerald (バイバイエメラルド, Baibai Emerarudo). The magic from the bracelet, coming from Momoka's belief in their friendship, prevents Shiori from attacking her. As she recovers part of her memories, the Magimajo Pures discover she was a Magical Heroine, but she flees and has Jamahiko suppress her memories.
14	"The Star and Moon Magical Heroine" "Sutā Ando Mūn no Mahō Senshi" (スターアンドムーンの魔法戦士)	Ryusuke Kurahashi	Hisako Fujihira	July 1, 2018
The Magimajo Pures confront Shiori, but she is too powerful to defeat. When Momoka's friendship bracelet prevents Shiori from attacking, the Magimajo Pures purelize her, reverting her back to her original form and freeing Lalanyan.
15	"The Mysterious Hottie: Masahiko Appears!" "Nazo no Ikemen: Masahiko Tōjō!" (謎のイケメン・正彦登場！)	Ryusuke Kurahashi	Hisako Fujihira	July 8, 2018
Momoka has successfully Pure Rised Shiori and Shiori joins Wind of Dreams Middle School to meet the handsome and popular upperclassman, Masahiko Makabe. Meanwhile, Momoka and the others visit a bakery during their social studies tour. However, the store manager has turned into an Akiramest Yakeppanchi. The four of them have their first battle together with their powers to purelize him, recovering the Telepathy Moon (テレパシームーン, Terepashī Mūn)
16	"Shiori Becomes a Supermodel?!" "Shiori, Sūpāmoderu ni!?" (シオリ、スーパーモデルに!?)	Ryusuke Kurahashi	Hisako Fujihira	July 15, 2018
Kojiro scouts Shiori to become a model, but Mudako turns him into the Akiramest Meiwaku Artist and causes him to attack Sawanobori. Shiori purelizes him, recovering the Dancing Tanzanite (ダンシングタンザナイト, Danshingu Tanzanaito). She later rejects the offer to become a model, as protecting dreams with the Magimajo Pures is more important.
17	"Momoka, a Healthy and Exciting Birthday!" "Momoka, Genki Morimori Bāsudē!" (モモカ、元気もりもりバースデー！)	Kenichiro Nishiumi	Mao Aoki	July 22, 2018
Momoka is excited about the barbecue party with her family on her birthday since she has not eaten anything since morning. Hungry, she goes to the barbecue shop with her family, only to learn that the store owner has been turned into an akiramest Nikutarashii by Dame Nojou. Momoka has to fight with full power and recover the Teleport Opal (テレポートオパール, Terepōto Opāru) to be able to eat the delicious grilled meat.
18	"Dreams on the Stars of the Night Sky..." "Yozora no Hoshi ni Yume o Nosete..." (夜空の星に夢を乗せて…)	Kenichiro Nishiumi	Mao Aoki	July 29, 2018
Masahiko, who has joined the newspaper club, teaches Momoka, Shiori, Sumire and Kaito in the astronomy room. However, Kaito's cousin who serves as the guide is turned into an Akiramest Arienaimon. The students in the classroom panic and Shiori Pure Rises alone, recovering the See-Through Quartz.
19	"Heart-pounding and Thrilling Athletics!" "Dokidoki Wakuwaku Asurechikku!" (ドキドキわくわくアスレチック！)	Hideyuki Yamamoto	Kana Matsui	August 5, 2018
MagiMajo Pures go out with Momoka's family for athletics, where Mitsuki is excited about her first athletics. When Minoru and Yui are turned into Akiramests Tokimekanain, Momoka meets Masahiko as her Majoka Porte makes a sound warning her about the Akiramest. Momoka uses the Dancing Tanzanite to purelize them, recovering the Comedy Tourmaline.
20	"Not Afraid of Ghosts?!" "Obake Nante Kowakunai!?" (お化けなんて怖くない！？)	Hideyuki Yamamoto	Kana Matsui	August 12, 2018
MagiMajo Pures go to the mansion of famous horror writer, Kō Sagawa, where Mitsuki gets scared of the rumors that ghosts will come. Meanwhile, the Majoka Porte is stolen from the girls by Muritarō who came to the mansion under the orders of Jama Hiko. MagiMajo Pures purelize him and recover the Small Aquamarine (小さなアクアマリン, Chīsana Akuamarin).
21	"Yukata Home Party!" "Yukata de Hōmu Pātī!" (浴衣でホームパーティー！)	Hideyuki Yamamoto	Yuya Nakazono	August 19, 2018
A home party happens at Momoka's house. Using the fashion aquamarine, Rin, Mitsuki and Shiori transform into cute Yukata. Masahiko also comes and Momoka's heart pounds. Meanwhile, a friend of Momoka's little sister, Sumire, is turned into an Akiramest Moiyo. MagiMajo Pures defeat the Akiramest and recover the Inverted Topaz (逆トパーズ, Gyaku Topāzu).
22	"Be Careful of the Ninja's Traps!" "Ninja no Wana ni Goyōshin!" (忍者のワナにご用心!)	Kenshi Yokoi	Yuya Nakazono	August 26, 2018
Momoka and Mitsuki visit Mitsuki's favorite Ninja Dojo with Masahiko. The female ninja, Ichika, is turned into an akiramest Konna Monja and traps the girls one by one. Meanwhile, Masahiko secretly aims for Momoka's Majoka Porte. Mitsuki defeats the Akiramest alone and recovers the Cooking Ametrine.
23	"The Majoka Porte Disappeared" "Kieta Majoka Porute" (消えたマジョカポルテ)	Kenshi Yokoi	Yuya Nakazono	September 2, 2018
Rin fails to use the comedic tourmaline to cheer Momoka up, who is depressed after losing her Majoka Porte. They go the science museum where the director is turned into an Akiramest Gakkurija. With Momoka unable to transform, Rin defeats the Akiramest herself and recovers the Honsety Tanzanite (正直タンザナイト, Shōjiki Tanzanaito).
24	"Big Pinch in the Calligraphy Room!" "Shodō Kyōshitsu de Dai Pinchi!" (書道教室で大ピンチ！)	Kenshi Yokoi	Mao Aoki	September 9, 2018
Momoka enters the calligraphy classroom with her mother, where the calligraphy teacher is turned into an Akiramest Hetappi. Unable to transform without her Majoka Porte, another Magimajo Pure arrived and purelize the Akiramest, recovering the Candy Tourmaline.
25	"The Magical Heroine, Yuria, Appears!" "Mahō Senshi Yuria Tōjō!" (魔法戦士ユリア登場！)	Shōri Hirano	Hisako Fujihira	September 16, 2018
Continuing from the previous episode, Yuria reveals herself to be the fifth MagiMajo Pures who saved Momoka when the latter could not transform. Yuria came to the human world to protect the Magic World. On the other hand, the girls are preparing for the cultural festival at the crepe shop, where the older girl who was teaching them is turned into an Akiramest Hottoite Crepe. MagiMajo Pures defeat the Akiramest and recover the Good Person Garnet.
26	"Discovery! Masahiko's True Form!" "Hakkaku! Masahiko-senpai no Shōtai!" (発覚！正彦先輩の正体！)	Shōri Hirano	Kana Matsui	September 23, 2018
Shiori has been decided to play Juliet from Romeo and Juliet for their school festival, but there are disturbing signs from Romeo played by Masahiko. During the cultural festival, Wakiko, who is standing on the same stage as Shiori, is turned into an Akiramest Medatachi Garietto. Wakiko is now manipulated by someone which Shiori defeated, recovering the Onaoshi Tanzainite.
27	"The Strongest! Yuria and the Majoka Iris" "Saikyō! Yuria to Majoka Airisu" (最強！ユリアとマジョカアイリス)	Ryusuke Kurahashi	Hisako Fujihira	September 30, 2018
Yuria gets a flower from a street performer named Tarou Fuusen and has come to the human world to experience it for the first time. When the street performer is turned into an Akiramest Dainashigeenin by the Nuisance Troupe, which she defeated.
28	"With the Powers of Five! Confront Jamahiko" "Go-nin no Chikara de! Jamahiko to Taiketsu" (5人の力で！邪魔彦と対決)	Ryusuke Kurahashi	Hisako Fujihira	October 7, 2018
Jamahiko appears in front of Momoka who wants to hear his true feelings, but the kind senior was no longer there. The other MagiMajo Pures fight Jamahiko to expel him from the human world, recovering the Memorial Topaz.
29	"Magical Halloween Night" "Majikaru Harouin Naito" (マジカル☆ハロウィンナイト)	Shōri Hirano	Yuya Nakazono	October 14, 2018
While the Magimajo Pures prepare a Halloween party at Tiara's jewelry shop, a pumpkin swallows Momoka, Rin, Mitsuki, and Shiori – teleporting them into the Akiramerld.
30	"The Magimajo Pures are Trapped!" "Torawareta Majimajo Pyuāzu!" (とらわれたマジマジョピュアーズ！)	Kenshi Yokoi	Kana Matsui	October 21, 2018
Yuria cannot rescue the Magimajo Pures from the Akiramerld unless they weaken the barrier. In the library, an Akiramest tempts Rin to remain there reading books. With the Akiramest's mirror, Rin remembers that her friends abandoned her for reading instead of spending time with them. Realizing that Mitsuki had supported Rin to become a Magical Heroine, Rin finds and purelizes the Akiramest, awakening to her proof of knowledge on the Majoka Iris.
31	"Believe in Your Friends! A New Power" "Nakama wo Shinjite! Aratana Pawā" (仲間を信じて！新たなパワー)	Kenshi Yokoi	Kana Matsui	October 28, 2018
An Akiramest challenges Mitsuki to a sports match in exchange for her freedom. Mitsuki stops her from cheating, but the Akiramest exploits her fear of darkness. Meanwhile, Shiori is tricked with an illusion of Momoka abandoning her and her own self telling her that she is alone. When both of them remember to trust in their friendship with the Magimajo Pures, they both awaken to their proofs of courage and friendship, purelizing the Akiramests.
32	"Awakening! Momoka's Heart Ruby" "Kakusei! Momoka no Hāto Rubī" (覚醒！モモカのハートルビー)	Ryusuke Kurahashi	Mao Aoki	November 3, 2018
Jamahiko persuades Momoka to stay to build their ideal world together. When she rejects him, her Heart Ruby changes into the Royal Heart Ruby. Yuria intervenes to save the four Magimajo Pures and informs them that they can attain Royal Form by combining the Majoka Iris with the Royal Heart Ruby now that all four have awakened to stronger magic. As they confront Jamahiko, the Magimajo Pures transform into their Royal Form.
33	"Big Mission! Purelize with the Royal Form" "Daisakusen! Roiyaru Fōmu de Pyuaraizu" (大決戦！ロイヤルフォームでピュアライズ)	Ryusuke Kurahashi	Mao Aoki	November 11, 2018
The Magimajo Pures transform into Royal Form, but Jamahiko still overwhelms them. With the Memorial Topaz and the Mirage Ametrine, Yuria reveals that Jamahiko used to be human who was kidnapped by Gran Ma. In order to free him from evil, the Magimajo Pures purelize him, and he disappears.
34	"A New Enemy: Gran Ma Appears!" "Aratana Teki: Guran Ma Tōjō!" (新たな敵・グラン魔登場！)	Kentaro Nishiumi	Yuya Nakazono	November 18, 2018
Distraught with Jamahiko's defeat, his grandmother, Gran Ma, takes over the Jamajama-dan to get revenge. A wedding planner is turned into the Special Akiramest Mukka, irritating the Magimajo Pures. Momoka, who is unaffected, saves everyone with the Good Person Garnet. They use their Royal Form to defeat Mukka and recover the Transformation Opal (ヘンシンオパール, Henshin Opāru).
35	"Adult Momoka Sneaks Into a Club!" "Otona Momoka, Kurabi ni Sennyu!" (大人モモカ、クラブに潜入！)	Kenichiro Nishiumi	Mao Aoki	November 25, 2018
Momoka's mother, Ririka, runs into Ryohei Daimon (Daimaou Kosaka), who had once confessed to her. Curious about their relationship, Momoka uses the Transformation Opal and Fashion Aquamarine to change into an adult and sneak into the club where Ryohei works as a DJ. However, he is turned into the Special Akiramest, Messo. The Magimajo Pures purelize him and recover the Translation Ametrine (ホンヤクアメトリン, Honyaku Ametorin).
36	"Magi Majo vs. Beautiful Witch!" "Maji Majo vs. Bimajo!" (マジマジョVS美魔女！)	Shōri Hirano	Kana Matsui	December 2, 2018
Ririka attends a skincare consultation with a celebrity beautician, Madame Rurudo (Haruna Ai), but Rurudo is turned into the Special Akiramest, Madame Ira. Yuria uses the Reverse Opal to turn her attack against her while Momoka uses the Baby Ametrine to help Madame Ira look young again. The two girls defeat her to recover the Illustration Garnet (イラストガーネット, Irasuto Gānetto). Yuria senses a magical aura from Ririka.
37	"Discovery! Momoka's Secret" "Hakkaku! Momoka no Himitsu" (発覚！モモカの秘密)	Yuya Nakazono	Kana Matsui	December 9, 2018
Momoka's father's cooking teacher, Hayashimori (Masataka Kubota), is turned into the Special Akiramest, Darru, who, along with his students, puts all the Magimajo Pures except for Yuria into a stupor. Ririka intervenes, causing Makoto to intercept an attack meant for Momoka and bringing her back to reality. The Magimajo Pures purelize Darru to recover the Slippery Opal (ツルツルオパール, Tsurutsuru Opāru). Yuria confronts Ririka, where she reveals that she used to be a Magical Heroine.
38	"Happy Magical Christmas!" "Happī Majikaru Kurisumasu!" (ハッピー♡マジカルクリスマス！)	Kenshi Yokoi	Hisako Fujihira	December 16, 2018
While helping out Yumenokaze Kindergarten with their Christmas party, the principal is turned into the Special Akiramest, Yada. The Magimajo Pures purelize him and recover the Snow Emerald. Gran Ma and the Jamajama-dan arrive, but the children's strong belief in Santa causes him to appear, taking a smitten Gran Ma away with him.
39	"My Mom is a Magical Heroine?!" "Okāsan ga Mahō Senshi!?" (お母さんが魔法戦士！？)	Kenshi Yokoi	Kana Matsui	December 23, 2018
Tiara tells Ririka that because Momoka has the Royal Heart Ruby, she plans on nominating her to become the Majoka Princess at the next council meeting. Ririka decides to reveal herself to the Magimajo Pures as a former Magical Heroine from the Magical World, aware that Momoka had become one from the beginning. Momoka was initially overwhelmed but decides to get to know her mother better.
40	"A Majoka Princess is Born?!" "Tanjō!? Majoka Purinsesu" (誕生！？マジョカプリンセス)	Ryusuke Kurahashi	Yuya Nakazono	January 6, 2019
The Magimajo Pures spy on the council meeting, where Tiara nominates Momoka to be the next Majoka Princess. The living Jama Baron works on returning to the Jamajama-dan.
41	"Yuria Found What She Loves!" "Yuria no Daisuki, Mitsuketa!" (ユリアの大好き、見つけた！)	Ryusuke Kurahashi	Yuya Nakazono	January 13, 2019
Yuria explores town to find a hobby like the Magimajo Pures and becomes fascinated with ramen. Damenojo turns the shop owner into the Akiramest, Akiramen. She purelizes him and recovers the Handsome Moonstone (イケメンムーンストーン, Ikemen Mūnsutōn).
42	"Go For it! Rin's Manga Journey" "Mezase! Rin no Manga Michi" (目指せ！リンのマンガ道)	Shori Hirano	Mao Aoki	January 20, 2019
Kaito wins an art contest and introduces Rin to his mother's editor, Imai. Rin creates a manuscript and submits it to Imai, but Muritaro turns Imai into the Akiramest, Shimekiri Girigiri. Rin purelizes her to recover the Lucky Emerald. Later, she withdraws her manuscript, guilty over creating it using Kaito's drawing skills with the Transformation Opal. However, Kaito offers to partner up her to produce manga.
43	"Mitsuki's Dance Challenge!" "Mitsuki, Dansu ni Chōsen!" (ミツキ、ダンスに挑戦！)	Shori Hirano	Mao Aoki	January 27, 2019
Mitsuki, Moe, and Nanami enter a dance contest, but Nanami has no confidence and wants to give up. Their dance teacher, Gonzalez Maeda, is turned into the Akiramest Aburagisshu. Mitsuki purelizes him, recovering the Time Machine Topaz.
44	"The Jama Baron Has Returned!" "Kaettekita Jama Danshaku!" (帰ってきた邪魔男爵！)	Kenshi Yokoi	Hisako Fujihira	February 3, 2019
Momoka, Rin, and Mitsuki are appointed as guidance counselors for the new teachers, who are the Jamajama-dan in disguise. When they reveal themselves, they turn Mr. Omachi into the Akiramest Omito Oshi, causing the school to panic. The Majimajo Pures purelize him, recovering the Search Opal (オサガシオパール, Osagashi Opāru).
45	"Let's Go, Baby! Momoka vs. Damenojo" "Ikuze Beibī! Momoka vs. Damenojō" (行くぜベイビー！モモカVSダメ之丞)	Kenshi Yokoi	Kana Matsui	February 10, 2019
Damenojo remembers his human life, where he used to be an apprentice at a sweets shop. Recalling that his master used to criticize him and discourage him, he visits the sweet shop and puts his master under control. When Momoka confronts him, she helps him realize his dream of becoming a pastry chef and purelizes him, turning his Akirame Stone into an Akiramenai Stone.
46	"Mudako: The Time Capsule of Promises" "Mudako: Yakusoku no Taimu Kapuseru" (ムダ子・約束のタイムカプセル)	Shori Hirano	Hisako Fujihira	February 17, 2019
Mudako remembers that she and her friend, Nobuko, hid a time capsule as humans, only to find that Nobuko never returned to help her unearth it. Shiori reminds Mudako of their friendship and finds the time capsule within Nobuko's letter with the Speech Garnet. Shiori purelizes Mudako, turning her Akirame Stone into an Akiramenai Stone, and she reunites with Nobuko.
47	"Smile, Muritaro" "Waratte, Muritaro" (笑って・ムリ太郎)	Kenichiro Nishiumi	Yuya Nakazono	February 24, 2019
Muritaro remembers that as a human, he gave up his dream of becoming a comedian and attacks a comedy act out of resentment. The Magimajo Pures help him remember his dream and purelize him, turning his Akirame Stone into an Akiramenai Stone.
48	"Let's Go to the Magical World!" "Iza! Mahō-kai e" (いざ！魔法界へ)	Kenshi Yokoi	Kana Matsui	March 3, 2019
Momoka's classmates have started giving up on their dreams. The Jama Baron activates the Impureler, which will cause the Magic and Real Worlds to merge, with Magimajo Pures going to the Magical World to prevent this. However, Momoka must decide between staying in the human world or staying in the Magical World forever as the new Majoka Princess.
49	"The Final Decisive Battle with the Jama the Great!" "Jama Taitei to no Saishū Kessen!" (邪魔大帝との最終決戦！)	Ryusuke Kurahashi	Mao Aoki	March 10, 2019
The Jama Baron, who has upgraded into the Jama the Great, transports the Magimajo Pures to his castle, and the other girls remain to fight while Momoka goes to the Magical World. However, she decides to turn back, only to find out that the Jama the Great has defeated and captured them.
50	"Purelize the Sparkling Magic!" "Kirameku Mahō de Pyuaraizu!" (きらめく魔法でピュアライズ！)	Ryusuke Kurahashi	Mao Aoki	March 17, 2019
Jamahiko intervenes to rescue Momoka and reminds her of the bonds she has with her friends. As Momoka awakens them during the battle, she fails to purelize the Jama the Great, and he uses the Impureler to activate a missile to strike them. With help from the former Jamajama-dan, who throw their Akiramenai Stones to destroy the Impureler, the Magimajo Pures purelize the Jama the Great.
51	"Magimajo Pures! are Forever" "Majimajo Pyuāzu! wa Eien ni" (マジマジョピュアーズ！は永遠に)	Kenshi Yokoi and Ryusuke Kurahashi	Hisako Fujihira	March 24, 2019
After the Jama the Great has been defeated, everyone moves on with their lives and dreams. Momoka is crowned the new Majoka Princess in the Magical World and must stay there forever. However, she rejoins her friends in the Human World after using the Copy Moonstone to clone herself.

=== Discography ===
==== Studio albums ====
Title	Year	Album details	Peak chart positions		Sales
Title	Year	Album details	JPN	JPN Hot	Sales
Magical Best: Complete Magical² Songs	2019	Released: February 13, 2019; Label: Sony Music Entertainment Japan; Formats: CD, digital download	4	3	18,883+
"—" denotes releases that did not chart or were not released in that region.

==== Extended plays ====
Title	Year	Album details	Peak chart positions		Sales
Title	Year	Album details	JPN	JPN Hot	Sales
Harerusa (晴れるさ☀)	2018	Released: September 26, 2018; Label: Sony Music Entertainment Japan; Formats: CD, digital download	8	9	13,074+
"—" denotes releases that did not chart or were not released in that region.

==== Singles ====
Title	Year	Peak chart positions		Sales	Album
Title	Year	JPN	JPN Hot	Sales	Album
"Ai ni Tsuite" (愛について♡) / "Chō Lucky" (超ラッキー☆) (Note: "Ai ni Tsuite" was first released as a digital single on March 30, 2018 on iTunes before later being released as a physical double A-side single with "Cho Lucky" on June 13, 2018. The sales count and Oricon ranking reflects "Ai ni Tsuite / Cho Lucky" while only "Ai ni Tsuite" charted on the Billboard Japan Hot 100.)	2018	6	33	15,163+	Magical Best: Complete Magical² Songs
"Harerusa" (晴れるさ☀)	2018	—	—	—	Harerusa
"Mirumiru (Mirai Mieru)" (ミルミル ～未来ミエル～)	2018	5	31	JPN: 21,343	Magical Best: Complete Magical² Songs
"—" denotes releases that did not chart or were not released in that region.

===== Promotional singles =====
Title	Year	Peak chart positions		Sales	Album
Title	Year	JPN	JPN Hot	Sales	Album
"Fure Fure" (フレフレ)	2018	—	—	—	Magical Best: Complete Magical² Songs
"—" denotes releases that did not chart or were not released in that region.

=== Manga ===
Magic × Warrior Magimajo Pures!: Magical na Mainichi (魔法×戦士 マジマジョピュアーズ! 〜マジカルな毎日〜) is illustrated by Yuuki Harami and ran in Pucchigumi starting from the May 2018 issue.

=== Other media ===
Momoka's Magical Heroine outfit was made available in the game Kiratto Pri Chan for the characters Mirai, Emo and Rinka through a card exclusively released in Pucchigumi on December 27, 2018.
