= List of Japanese manga magazines by circulation =

The following is a list of Japanese manga magazines by circulation, during the time span of July 1 to September 30, 2026. These figures have been collected by the Japanese Magazine Publishers Association, which updates every three months. The updates are given long after the months they reflect have passed due to the amount of information it takes to compile.

== Periodical circulation ==
Rank	Name	Japanese name	Monthly Circulation	Demographic	Founded	Publisher
1	Weekly Shōnen Jump	週刊少年ジャンプ	1,035,455	Shōnen	1968	Shueisha
2	Weekly Shōnen Magazine	週刊少年マガジン	285,615	Shōnen	1959	Kodansha
3	CoroCoro Comic	コロコロコミック (Note: Listed as Monthly CoroCoro Comic (月刊コロコロコミック))	220,033	Kodomo	1977	Shogakukan
4	Weekly Young Jump	週刊ヤングジャンプ	210,273	Seinen	1979	Shueisha
5	Big Comic Original	ビッグコミックオリジナル	156,333	Seinen	1972	Shogakukan
6	Weekly Young Magazine	週刊ヤングマガジン (Note: Listed as Young Magazine (ヤングマガジン))	127,500	Seinen	1980	Kodansha
7	Weekly Shōnen Sunday	週刊少年サンデー	120,000	Shōnen	1959	Shogakukan
8	Comic Ran	コミック乱	116,500	Seinen	1995	Good Smile Company
9	Jump Square	ジャンプスクエア	107,000	Shōnen	2007	Shueisha
10	Big Comic	ビッグコミック	103,667	Seinen	1968	Shogakukan
11	Monthly Shōnen Magazine	月刊少年マガジン	95,500	Shōnen	1964	Kodansha
12	Ribon	りぼん	89,333	Shōjo	1955	Shueisha
13	Saikyō Jump	最強ジャンプ	86,667	Shōnen	2010	Shueisha
14	Grand Jump	グランドジャンプ	79,833	Seinen	2011	Shueisha
15	Comic Ran Twins	コミック乱ツインズ	77,130	Seinen	2001	Good Smile Company
16	Ciao	ちゃお	70,000	Shōjo	1977	Shogakukan
17	Morning	モーニング	63,908	Seinen	1982	Kodansha
18	LaLa	LaLa	45,200	Shōjo	1976	Hakusensha
19	Televi-Kun	てれびくん	45,000	Kodomo (Note: JMPA lists this under "Children's Comics")	1976	Shogakukan
20	Big Comic Spirits	ビッグコミックスピリッツ	41,091	Seinen	1980	Shogakukan
21	Hana to Yume	花とゆめ	39,417	Shōjo	1974	Hakusensha
22	Pucchigumi	ぷっちぐみ	38,000	Kodomo (Female)	2006	Shogakukan
23	Young Animal	ヤングアニマル	30,917	Seinen	1992	Hakusensha
24	Bessatsu Margaret	別冊マーガレット	30,000	Shōjo	1963	Shueisha
25	Office You	office YOU	30,000	Josei	1985	Shueisha
26	Be Love	BE・LOVE	25,500	Josei	1980	Kodansha
27	Big Comic Superior	ビッグコミックスペリオール	24,833	Seinen	1987	Shogakukan
28	Cocohana	ココハナ	24,667	Josei	1994	Shueisha
29	Kiss	Kiss	21,000	Josei	1992	Kodansha
30	CoroCoro Ichiban	コロコロイチバン！	20,000	Shōnen	2005	Shogakukan
31	Monthly Afternoon	月刊アフタヌーン (Note: Listed as Afternoon (アフタヌーン))	19,300	Seinen	1986	Kodansha
32	Nakayoshi	なかよし	19,167	Shōjo	1955	Kodansha
33	Dessert	デザート	19,000	Shōjo/Josei	1996	Kodansha
34	Ultra Jump	ウルトラジャンプ	18,667	Seinen (Note: JMPA lists this under "Shōnen Comics")	1999	Shueisha
35	Flowers	フラワーズ	17,000	Josei	2002	Shogakukan
36	Petit Comic	プチコミック	16,500	Josei	1977	Shogakukan
37	LaLa DX	LaLa DX	15,900	Shōjo	1983	Hakusensha
38	Melody	メロディ	15,000	Josei	1997	Hakusensha
39	Margaret	マーガレット	13,500	Shōjo	1963	Shueisha
40	Cookie	クッキー	13,000	Shōjo/Josei	1999	Shueisha
41	Shōnen Sunday S (Note: Formerly Shōnen Sunday Super)	少年サンデーエス	11,667	Shōnen	1978	Shogakukan
42	Bessatsu Friend	別冊フレンド	11,000	Shōjo	1965	Kodansha
43	Sho-Comi (Note: Formerly Shōjo Comic (少女コミック))	少コミ	8,200	Shōjo	1968	Shogakukan
44	Betsucomi	ベツコミ	8,000	Shōjo	1970	Shogakukan
45	Cheese!	チーズ!	8,000	Shōjo	1996	Shogakukan
46	Bessatsu Shōnen Magazine	別冊少年マガジン	8,000	Shōnen	2009	Kodansha
47	Monthly Shōnen Sunday	月刊少年サンデー (Note: Listed as Gessan (ゲッサン))	7,667	Shōnen	2009	Shogakukan
48	Monthly Shōnen Sirius	月刊少年シリウス	6,900	Shōnen	2005	Kodansha
49	Monthly Sunday Gene-X	サンデージェネックス	6,533	Seinen	2000	Shogakukan
50	Monthly Big Comic Spirits	月刊!スピリッツ	2,500	Seinen	2009	Shogakukan

== Total circulation ==
The figures below are from when the magazine first was published to roughly 2018.

Name	Japanese name	Total circulation/sales (millions)	Demographic	Founded	Publisher
Weekly Shōnen Jump	週刊少年ジャンプ	7,500 (Note: See Weekly Shōnen Jump § Circulation figures.)	Shōnen	1968	Shueisha
Weekly Shōnen Magazine	週刊少年マガジン	5,237 (Note: See: Weekly Shōnen Magazine § Circulation.)	Shōnen	1959	Kodansha
Weekly Young Jump	週刊ヤングマガジン	2,262 (Note: See: Weekly Young Jump § Circulation)	Seinen	1979	Shueisha
Weekly Shōnen Sunday	週刊少年サンデー	1,877 (Note: See: Weekly Shōnen Sunday § Circulation.)	Shōnen	1959	Shogakukan
Weekly Young Magazine	週刊ヤングマガジン	1,869 (Note: See: Weekly Young Magazine § Circulation)	Seinen	1980	Kodansha
Ribon	りぼん	594 (Note: See: Ribon § Circulation.)	Shōjo	1955	Shueisha
Nakayoshi	なかよし	414 (Note: See: Nakayoshi § Circulation.)	Shōjo	1955	Kodansha
CoroCoro Comic	コロコロコミック	407 (Note: See: CoroCoro Comic § Circulation.)	Kodomo/Shōnen	1977	Shogakukan
Monthly Shōnen Jump	月刊少年ジャンプ	215 (Note: See Monthly Shōnen Jump § Circulation)	Shōnen	1970	Shueisha

== See also ==
- List of magazines by circulation
- List of manga magazines
- List of manga magazines published outside of Japan
- List of best-selling manga
- List of best-selling comic series
