= Pucchigumi =

Japanese manga magazine

- Cover of the October 2015 issue, featuring PriPara
- Categories: Children's manga (female)
- Frequency: Monthly
- Circulation: 38,000; (July–September 2026)
- Publisher: Shogakukan
- First issue: July 2006
- Country: Japan
- Language: Japanese
- Website: pucchigumi.net

Pucchigumi (Japanese: ぷっちぐみ, Hepburn: Putchigumi; lit. 'Petit Group') is a Japanese monthly children's manga magazine published by Shogakukan. Several different manga titles and adaptations aimed at young female readers have been serialized in the magazine in its decade-long history. The latest circulation figures places the magazine at 40,000 copies which is in the middle third of the circulation list (Note: The "list" is a compilation (sorted by circulation) of all of the manga magazines that appear on the Japanese Magazine Publishers Association's website.) when compared to other manga magazines.

== Overview ==
Pucchigumi first began publication in July 2006 with a targeted audience aimed towards young girls. Original serialized works include titles such as Fluffy, Fluffy Cinnamoroll among other independent one shots (doujinshi). The other main serialization comes in the form of manga from franchises Shogakukan has the rights to. Examples of these include Jewelpet, My Little Pony: Friendship Is Magic, and Pretty Rhythm. Pucchigumi has also featured manga artists such as Riyoko Ikeda giving an "illustration course" for kids. Upcoming anime announcements related to titles owned by Shogakukan are also announced and promoted in Pucchigumi. These have included the Girls × Heroine Series and Aikatsu!. For advertisement, a few characters have appeared more than once on the front covers of the magazine. In March 2013 Shogakukan released via YouTube a song titled "Pucchigumi's Song" (ぷっちぐみのうた).

In addition to serialized manga, Pucchigumi holds yearly auditions for girls under 12 years old to model exclusively for their magazine and other promotional material, to which they are known as Pucchi Models. Current models include Anna (2017–present), Yumena Iio, and Beni Abe (2019–present). Past models include Akari Motokura, whose tenure was from 2015 to 2016.

== Serialized Manga ==
=== Past ===
- Fluffy, Fluffy Cinnamoroll (2006–2008)
- Kirarin Revolution (2006–2009)
- Happy Kappy (2007–2011?)
- Mofu Mofu (2008–2016?)
- Jewelpet (2009)
- Together Sugarbunnies (2009)
- Lilpri (2009–2011)
- Go Go! Tamagotchi! (2010–2011)
- Pretty Rhythm: Dear My Future (2012)
- Pretty Rhythm: Rainbow Live (2013)
- Aikatsu! Official Fanbook (2013–?)
- Chibi Devi! (Special) (2013)
- Go Go! Tamagotchi! Dream (2013)
- My Little Pony: Friendship Is Magic (2013–2014)
- Pretty Rhythm: All Star Selection (2014)
- Yo-kai Watch: Exciting Nyanderful Days (2014)
- Nico in Fairyland (おとぎの国のNico) (2015–2017)
- Licca-chan (2015–2018)
- Toki no Tani (2016)
- Idol x Warrior Miracle Tunes! (2017–2018)
- Magical × Heroine Magimajo Pures! (2018–2019)

=== Current ===
- Kiratto Pri Chan (2018–)
- Aikatsu on Parade! (2019–)
- Secret × Heroine Phantomirage! (2019–)

== Readership ==
Based on information from the Japanese Magazine Publishers Association, circulation was figured at 60,667 for the period of January 1 to March 31, 2018. Circulation of the magazine in this data which starts in January, 2010 shows a peak circulation of 151,667 occurring between October, and December 2013. A study of readership done in 2007 shows that the highest percentage of readers are elementary school aged children.
