= Happy Kappy =

Japanese manga series

はっぴ～カッピ (Happi Kappi)
- Genre: Fantasy
- Manga
- Written by: Rino Mizuho
- Published by: Shogakukan
- Magazine: Shōgaku Ichinensei; Pucchigumi
- Original run: 2007 – 2011?
- Anime television series
- Directed by: Takuya Minezawa
- Produced by: Hiroko Matsumoto; Masahiro Saitō
- Written by: Tomoko Konparu
- Music by: Cher Watanabe
- Studio: Shougakukan Music & Digital Entertainment Inc.
- Original network: TV Tokyo
- Original run: April 6, 2011 – October 5, 2011
- Episodes: 25 + 1 special

Happy Kappy (はっぴ～カッピ, Happi Kappi) is a Japanese manga series written and illustrated by Rino Mizuho. Happy Kappy was serialized in Shogakukan's Shōgaku Ichinensei and later Pucchigumi magazines. It was adapted into an anime television series under the direction of Takuya Minezawa and began its broadcast run in Japan on April 6, 2011, on TV Tokyo.

== Plot ==
The series follows nine-year-old Suguri Kinoshita, who loves animals and making fashion accessories. One day, while buying materials for accessories, Suguri finds an unusual rock which she thinks will look cute on a bracelet. But when she picks it up, she discovers that the rock is a creature named Kappy, the three-year-old prince of Kapimeshia.

== Characters ==
Suguri Kinoshita
Voiced by: Rumi Ookubo
Kappy
Voiced by: Emiri Katou

== Media ==
=== Anime ===
No.	Title	Original release date
1	"Happy Kappy Doughnuts!!"; Transliteration: "Hapi Kapi Dōnattsu!!" (Japanese: はぴカピドーナッツ!!)	April 6, 2011
2	"Guri Flying In The Sky"; Transliteration: "Sora Tobu Guri-chan" (Japanese: そらとぶグリちゃん)	April 13, 2011
3	"Kappy's Helper"; Transliteration: "Kappi no Otetsudai" (Japanese: カッピのおてつだい)	April 20, 2011
4	"Kappy's Outing"; Transliteration: "Odekake kappi" (Japanese: おでかけカッピ)	April 27, 2011
5	"Which One Is Umauma?"; Transliteration: "Dotchi ga umauma?" (Japanese: どっちがうまうま?)	May 4, 2011
6	"Dokuroppy is Here!"; Transliteration: "Dokuroppi ga Kita!" (Japanese: ドクロッピがきた!)	May 11, 2011
7	"Goodbye, Kappy"; Transliteration: "Sayonara Kappi" (Japanese: さよならカッピ)	May 18, 2011
8	"A Wonderful Present"; Transliteration: "Sutekina Purezento" (Japanese: すてきなプレゼント)	May 25, 2011
9	"Whippy is Here!"; Transliteration: "Hoippi Gaki Chatta!" (Japanese: ホイッピがきちゃった!)	June 1, 2011
10	"Guri's Big Transformation"; Transliteration: "Guri-chan no Dai Henshin" (Japanese: グリちゃんのだいへんしん)	June 8, 2011
11	"Kobara, the Phantom Thief?"; Transliteration: "Kaitō Kobara-chan!?" (Japanese: かいとうコバラちゃん!?)	June 15, 2011
12	"Kappy's Rain Shelter"; Transliteration: "Kappi no Ama Yadori" (Japanese: カッピのあまやどり)	June 22, 2011
13	"Everyone Came All At Once"; Transliteration: "Minna ga Ichidoni Yattekita" (Japanese: みんながいちどにやってきた)	June 29, 2011
14	"Run, Guri!"; Transliteration: "Hashire! Guri-chan" (Japanese: はしれ!グリちゃん)	July 6, 2011
15	"Chuchuburesu is Gone!"; Transliteration: "Chuchuburesu ga Kie Chatta" (Japanese: チュチュブレスがきえちゃった)	July 13, 2011
16	"Happy Anniversary"; Transliteration: "Happī Na Kinenbi" (Japanese: はっぴーなきねんび)	July 20, 2011
17	"Camp Rampage"; Transliteration: "Kyanpu de Dai Bou-sō" (Japanese: キャンプでだいぼうそう)	July 27, 2011
18	"Everybody's Treasure Hunt"; Transliteration: "Min'nadetakara Sagashi" (Japanese: みんなでたからさがし)	August 3, 2011
19	"Umauma Shrinks"; Transliteration: "Chitchaku Natte Umauma" (Japanese: ちっちゃくなってうまうま)	August 17, 2011
Special	"I Love Kappy!"; Transliteration: "Kappi Daisuki!" (Japanese: カッピだいすき!)	August 24, 2011
20	"Puppy in Love"; Transliteration: "Koisuru wan-chan" (Japanese: こいするワンちゃん)	August 31, 2011
21	"Funny Contest"; Transliteration: "Okashina Kontesuto" (Japanese: おかしなコンテスト)	September 7, 2011
22	"Strange Memories"; Transliteration: "Fushigina Omoidedama" (Japanese: ふしぎなおもいでだま)	September 14, 2011
23	"Kappy and the Big Fight"; Transliteration: "Kappi to Ōgenka" (Japanese: カッピとおおげんか)	September 21, 2011
24	"I Can't Do Magic!"; Transliteration: "Mahō ga Tsukaenai!" (Japanese: まほうがつかえない!)	September 28, 2011
25	"Isn't He Happy? Kappy!"; Transliteration: "Happī da Ne! Kappi!" (Japanese: はっぴーだね！カッピ!)	October 5, 2011
