= Idol × Warrior Miracle Tunes! =

Japanese tokusatsu television series (2017-2018)

- Promotional visual for the second half of the series
- Kanji: アイドルx戦士ミラクルちゅーんず！
- Genre: Tokusatsu, magical girl, children
- Created by: Tomy; OLM
- Written by: Hisako Fujihira; Kana Matsui; Mao Aoki
- Directed by: Takashi Miike; Yoshitaka Yamaguchi; Takeshi Yokoi; Kenichiro Nishiumi; Ryusuke Kurahashi
- Starring: Asaka Uchida; Suzuka Adachi; Yuzuha Oda; Rina Usukura; Mio Nishiyama
- Opening theme: "Catch Me!" by Miracle² (eps. 1-14); "Catch Me! (Powered Up Version)" by Miracle² (eps. 15-26); "Ten Made Todoke" by Miracle² (eps. 27-51)
- Ending theme: "Heart no Jewel" by Miracle² (eps. 1-14); "Jump!" by Miracle² (eps. 15-26); "Happy" by Miracle² (eps. 27-40); "Maware Maware" by Miracle² (eps. 41-51)
- Composer: Koji Endo
- Country of origin: Japan
- Original language: Japanese
- No. of episodes: 51

Production
- Executive producer: Takashi Kounosu
- Producers: Sayako Muramatsu; Tetsuya Endo; Misako Saka
- Running time: 30 minutes
- Production companies: OLM; Dentsu

Original release
- Network: TV Tokyo
- Release: April 2, 2017 – March 25, 2018

Related
- Magical × Heroine Magimajo Pures!

Idol × Warrior Miracle Tunes! (アイドル×戦士 ミラクルちゅーんず!, Aidoru Senshi Mirakuru Chūnzu!) is a Japanese television series that aired from April 2, 2017, to March 25, 2018, on TV Tokyo. The show is the first installment of the Girls × Heroine Series conceived by Takara Tomy and OLM, Inc. with the assistance of Shogakukan and EXPG Studio, aimed towards a female demographic between ages 2 to 6. The general director of the series is Takashi Miike, supported by a staff full of newcomer screenwriters and directors. The series stars Asaka Uchida, Suzuka Adachi, Yuzuha Oda, Rina Usukura, and Mio Nishiyama. The plot is centered on Japanese idol girl group Miracle² (pronounced "miracle miracle"), elementary and middle school girls who transform into Idol Warriors to retrieve the Sound Jewels, artifacts from the Music Kingdom, to stop the Demon King from taking over the world.

Auditions were held in December 2015, and the cast was announced at Ciao Summer Festival in August 2016. Filming took place from September 2016 to July 2017, combining elements of dance, song, and drama, with assistance from dance and vocal teachers at EXPG Studios and emphasis on cuteness and natural femininity. In addition, the show utilizes special effects for the transformation and battle scenes, which were later added after principal photography. The show also launched a brief singing career for the main cast, with Miracle² holding music activities in real life to promote the show.

Despite low television ratings, the show was a success for its primary demographic and was credited as the start of a "new genre" aimed towards elementary school girls, especially because of Miracle² music activities and the show's toy line. The series achieved a wide demographic appeal to girls, due to it being a live-action show centered on female interests, and with parents, who enjoyed the dancing and music. Two manga adaptations and a video game were released. Along with several dubs in Thailand, South Korea, and China, the show also received an Italian remake in 2018. Following the show's end in 2018, it was succeeded by Magical × Heroine Magimajo Pures!

== Synopsis ==
The Music Kingdom, a separate harmonious world that guards music, contains note-shaped gems called Sound Jewels; the Sound Jewels together produce the "Song of Blessings", a powerful melody that purifies and soothes people's hearts. However, they are stolen by the Demon King, who corrupts them into Negative Jewels and covers the Music Kingdom in darkness. Through the Dokudoku-dan, the Demon King's henchmen, the Negative Jewels are used to turn humans into Negative Jewelers. The Negative Aura spread by the Negative Jewelers allows the Demon King to compose his "Song of Darkness" to conquer the human world. In order to recover the Sound Jewels, the goddess of the Music Kingdom sends the Fairy Rhythms (妖精リズムズ, Yōsei Rizumuzu) Poppun, Rockie, and Clanosuke to the human world to seek help.

In the human world, Kanon Ichinose and Fuka Tachibana audition to become part of a new idol group called Miracle² with Mai Kanzaki, which was also partially held to recruit Idol Warriors to help Mai recover the Sound Jewels. Miracle² is later joined by sisters Akari and Hikari Shiratori of the American girl group KariKari. Becoming Miracle Tunes, the girls fight to purify the Negative Jewels back into their original forms to stop the Demon King. As magic uses up Harmony Energy, Miracle² must harvest energy by performing as idols in their daily lives.

== Cast and characters ==
=== Miracle Tunes ===
The main characters are in an idol group named Miracle² (pronounced "miracle miracle") who is signed to a fictional record label called Raspberry Music. They transform into Miracle Tunes using their Miracle Pods and Idol Jewels, a type of Sound Jewel given to them by a Rhythm. Each girl is given a Miracle Takt and using Special Jewels would allow them to change music genres with using their Miracle Pods to defeat their enemies. Originally consisting of Kanon Ichinose, Mai Kanzaki, and Fuka Tachibana, they are later joined by Akari and Hikari Shiratori, who transform with the Miracle Braces and fight with the Miracle Tambourines. Halfway throughout the series, the characters each recover a Crystal Jewel, which they can use to transform into Final Mode. During this time, Kanon's Miracle Takt changes into the Final Tune Takt.

- Asaka Uchida as Kanon Ichinose (一ノ瀬 カノン, Ichinose Kanon), a 6th grade elementary school student. She is a bright and cheerful girl who sometimes can be scatterbrained.
- Suzuka Adachi as Mai Kanzaki (神咲 マイ, Kanzaki Mai), a second-year middle school student. She is the leader of Miracle² and a top idol. Her father is Seitaro Kanzaki, a conductor working overseas, while her mother was a pianist before her death.
- Yuzuha Oda as Fūka Tachibana (橘 フウカ, Tachibana Fūka), a first-year middle school student. She is a dance prodigy who is serious about performing, causing her to disagree with Kanon sometimes. Her parents are doctors who travel abroad to dangerous parts of the world, while she lives with her grandparents.
- Rina Usukura as Akari Shiratori (白鳥 アカリ, Shiratori Akari), a first-year middle school student. Born in the village of Amerimura, Akari and her sister Hikari lived in the United States where they debuted as KariKari before returning to Japan and joining Miracle². Akari is stubborn and unwilling to lose without a fight, but passionate about her friends.
- Mio Nishiyama as Hikari Shiratori (白鳥 ヒカリ, Shiratori Hikari): Hikari is a first-year middle school student and Akari's sister, the two previously debuting as American pop duo KariKari before joining Miracle². Hikari is a perfectionist and pays close attention to her appearance except for when she relaxes at home.

=== Raspberry Music ===
- Mayumi Ono as Mayumi Yuzuhara (柚原 真弓, Yuzuhara Mayumi), is Miracle²'s manager who knows the true identities of Miracle Tunes. She is later revealed to be a former idol and Idol Warrior.
- Sasuke Otsuru as Kojirō (コジロー), Miracle²'s make-up artist and stylist who is also openly gay. He is Yuzuhara's friend from high school where he was a delinquent.
- Akiko Hinagata as Yukie Suzuhara (鈴原 雪江, Suzuhara Yukie), the dorm supervisor of Miracle².
- Takumi as Kazunari Sawanobori (澤登 和也, Sawanobori Kazunari), Miracle²'s producer.

=== Music Kingdom ===
- Mai Hikimi as Goddess of Music (音楽の女神, Ongaku no Megami), the queen of the Music Kingdom who communicates with Miracle² through a mirror in the studio's make-up room. She is later revealed to be Mai's mother.
- Mari Hino as Poppun (ポップン) (voice), the Fairy Rhythm of pop music and Kanon's partner. She tries her best in everything and loves to eat and sleep.
- Makiko Hiraguchi as Rocky (ロッキー, Rokkī) (voice), the Fairy Rhythm of rock music and Mai's partner. Rockie has a cool and cheeky personality, but he gets scared easily.
- Yuko Mori as Clanosuke (くらのすけ, Kuranosuke) (voice), the Fairy Rhythm of classical music and Fuka's partner. Clanosuke is a diligent fairy and a crybaby.
- Reika Yoshimoto as Alm (アルム, Arumu) (voice), a Fairy Rhythm who is one of the Goddess' attendants and Sopra's older sister, later becoming Akari's partner. Alm is very confident and has a personality like a "queen."
- Chitose Morinaga as Sopra (ソプラ, Sopura) (voice), a Fairy Rhythm who is one of the Goddess' attendants and Alm's younger sister, later becoming Hikari's partner. Sopra is gentle and loves cleaning.

=== Dark World ===
- James Jirayu as Demon King (魔王, Maō), the ruler of the Dark World who devastated the Music Kingdom stole the Sound Jewels needed to play the "Song of Blessings", the only thing that can purify him. His ultimate goal is to cover the world in darkness once he finishes composing the "Song of Darkness".
- Baruto Kaito as Uno (ウノー, Unō) and Sano (サノー, Sanō), twin demons created by the Demon King to replace the Dokudoku-dan. After Miracle Tunes acquire Final Mode, Uno and Sano are purified into a tortoise and a hare.

==== Dokudoku-dan ====
The Dokudoku-dan (毒毒団) are three Deluxe Negative Jewelers who serve under the Demon King as his commanders, using the Negative Jewels to turn people into Negative Jewelers (ネガティブジュエラー, Negatibu Juerā) that spread a Negative Aura for the Demon King's use in composing the "Song of Darkness".

- Motoki Fukami as Sage Mizoochi (溝落 健二, Mizo'ochi Kenji), a Deluxe Negative Jeweler who is the Dokudoku-dan's acting leader.
- Miyuki Torii as Madame Nechigae (根地替女史, Nechigae-joshi), is a Deluxe Negative Jeweler and the Dodukdoku-dan's sole female member.
- Satoshi Tomiura as Dr. Komuragaeri (小村返博士, Komuragaeri Hakase), a Deluxe Negative Jeweler and the Dokudoku-dan's eccentric genius.

=== Recurring characters ===
- Daijiro Kawaoka as Tomoki Sakurai (桜井 智樹, Sakurai Tomoki), Kanon's homeroom teacher at Angie Private Academy.
- Naoki Sasahara as Yunta Serizawa (芹沢 ユンタ, Serizawa Yunta), Kanon's classmate and sits next to her.
- Andrew Night as Rudolph Rain (ルドルフ・レイン, Rudorufu Rein), Kanon's half-Japanese classmate who lived abroad before returning Japan. He is a big fan of Akari.
- Kohaku Suda as Erina Tamagawa (玉川 エリナ, Tamagawa Erina), Kanon's classmate who is one of the top students in class.
- Tsubasa Nakagawa as Ryo Kurihara (栗原 リョウ, Kurihara Ryō), a popular child actor.

== Production ==
Idol × Warrior Miracle Tunes! was a collaborative project between Takara Tomy, OLM, Inc. and Shogakukan, the publishers of the manga magazines Ciao and Pucchigumi. The production also included a toy line produced by Takara Tomy, featuring the magical items, weapons, and accessories depicted in the show. The show was primarily aimed towards a female audience between the ages of 2 and 6. The show was advertised with the catchphrase, "Live start! We're Tuning your bad hearts!" (ライブスタート！悪いハートをチューニング！)

The story's concept was originally developed by Masato Nakamura under the penname Miyabi Nakamura. Takashi Miike signed on as a general director for the series. Additional staff members included Yoshitaka Yamaguchi, Takeshi Yokoi, Kenichiro Nishiumi, and Ryusuke Kurahashi as episode directors, with Hisako Fujihira, Kana Matsui, and Mao Aoki as the main writers for the show. The dances were choreographed by EXPG Studio. Miike noted that the staff working on the show were young and relatively new to the industry, having little experience in writing dramas and working with newcomer actors. Despite the difference in experience between Miike and the main cast, Miike's attitude towards the project was consistent with his other work, with OLM producer Fumio Inoue stating that they worked without dismissing it as "simply a kids' show." Reiko Sasaki, the project manager at Shogakukan, stated that after integrating dancing and singing, she came up with scenarios on how to integrate the toys into the show.

Principal photography for Idol × Warrior Miracle Tunes! began in September 2016 and ended in July 2017. Transformation and live finish scenes were filmed at a studio in front of a green screen, where CG effects were later applied. Nishiumi mentioned that scenes were shot with discussion from Miike, who wanted the show to be portrayed in a "cute" manner. The staff focused on the elements of "dance", "song", and "drama", with dance and singing supported by teachers while filming focused on the "natural femininity" from young girls. Miike also stated that the staff worked hard at bringing out the energy from the cast. Episode 38 was filmed in the headquarters of Takara Tomy, with the live performance filmed first and the episode plot afterwards.

=== Casting ===
Auditions were held by Ciao and Pucchigumi in December 2015 with the aid of LDH. Five girls were selected out of 11 finalists. The winners were revealed in August 2016 at Ciao Summer Festival, consisting of core cast members Asaka Uchida, Suzuka Adachi, and Yuzuha Oda. The first press conference for the show, depicting the cast in costume, took place on January 17, 2017. Rina Usukura and Mio Nishiyama were cast at the same time as Uchida, Adachi, and Oda, but were officially announced to the public during a press conference in June 2017.

To prepare for their roles, all five main cast members took intensive singing, dancing, and acting lessons in the summer of 2016. Ito was in charge of their dance lessons. Nishiumi assisted the cast with acting lessons, which began in June 2016. Prior to joining production, most of the main cast had dance experience, including Oda, who had been part of the idol group Amorecarina and Adachi, who had been part of EXPG Studio's female U-14 trainee team Kizzy and Bunnies. Usukura was a 5th generation member of the female U-12 dance and model agency Roni Girls. Nishiyama was the winner of Roni Girls' Catalogue Model Award in 2013 and the Smile Award at the Ciao Girl Audition in 2015. The only cast member without any dance experience was Uchida, who noted that training was "difficult." Oda choreographed her solo dance scenes with the assistance of her dance teacher.

=== Broadcast ===
The show was originally broadcast from April 2, 2017, to March 25, 2018, on TV Tokyo and BS TV Tokyo. Episodes were also uploaded onto Takara Tomy's official YouTube channel one week after its original broadcast date, with each new episode available worldwide to the public for up to one week. Idol × Warrior Miracle Tunes! was also aired in Thailand, South Korea, and China in regional language dubs. Episodes were also screened with English subtitles at Chara Expo USA 2018. Because television and commercials did not have a wide reach to the target demographic, project manager Reiko Sasaki attempted to use YouTube and other social media to have a wider outreach to the audience.

A documentary titled Make a Miracle!: Until Miracle Tunes! is Made (メイク ア ミラクル！～ミラクルちゅーんず！ができるまで～) aired on September 1, 2017, as a television special. The documentary contains behind-the-scenes footage on the show, including the main cast's auditions and dance rehearsals.

=== Music ===
During the show's run, the in-show Japanese idol group Miracle² held music activities under Sony Music Entertainment Japan, with main cast Asaka Uchida, Suzuka Adachi, Yuzuha Oda, Rina Usukura, and Mio Nishiyama performing as their characters at concerts, live events, and music festivals, including Japan Expo Thailand 2017. The group's music was released under the name Miracle² from Miracle Tunes (miracle² from ミラクルちゅーんず!, Mirakuru Mirakuru furomu Mirakuru Chūnzu!) They also appeared as guest regulars as their characters on the children's variety show Oha Suta. Miracle² performed all the opening and ending theme songs to Idol × Warrior Miracle Tunes!, as well as other songs on the show's original soundtrack.

The opening theme song to the show is "Catch Me!", performed by Miracle², which was given hip hop, rock, techno, and enka remixes to correspond with the special battle modes portrayed in the show. An updated version, "Catch Me! (Powered Up Version)", was released as a B-side to Miracle²'s second single, "Jump!", and includes Usukura and Nishiyama's vocals, which was used as the second opening theme song. The opening theme song for the show's second half, "Ten Made Todoke", featured elaborate choreography that the cast found difficult to learn, but also contained simple hand movements during the chorus that children could follow. The music video for the song was shot in one day, with the dance segments filmed at nighttime. The ending theme songs included "Heart no Jewel", "Jump!", "Happy", and "Maware Maware." Other songs featured in the show include "Parallel World", KariKari's duet song, and "Kira Tune!", Kanon's solo song.

Editors at CDJournal praised "Catch Me!", stating that the song was "happy pop tune with a bright pop EDM sound", and that it was "on the royal road of high quality teen pop." Likewise, "Ten Made Todoke" was praised for its "mature EDM sound" despite the actresses' age and was recommended for adults who enjoy idol music.

== Media ==
=== Discography ===
==== Albums ====
Title	Year	Album details	Peak chart positions		Sales
Title	Year	Album details	JPN	JPN Hot	Sales
Miracle Best: Complete Miracle² Songs	2018	Released: February 14, 2018; Label: Sony Music Entertainment Japan; Formats: CD, digital download	2	3	JPN: 31,000+
"—" denotes releases that did not chart or were not released in that region.

==== Singles ====
Title	Year	Peak chart positions		Sales	Album
Title	Year	JPN	JPN Hot	Sales	Album
"Catch Me!"	2017	14	—	JPN: 5,613+	Miracle Best: Complete Miracle² Songs
"Jump!"	2017	7	92	JPN: 7,383+	Miracle Best: Complete Miracle² Songs
"Ten Made Todoke" (天マデトドケ☆)	2017	8	28	JPN: 22,000+	Miracle Best: Complete Miracle² Songs
"—" denotes releases that did not chart or were not released in that region.

=== Manga ===
Two manga adaptations were released simultaneously during the show's run. Idol × Warrior Miracle Tunes! Kirakira Fever Live (アイドル×戦士 ミラクルちゅーんず! 〜キラキラフィーバー☆LIVE〜) was illustrated by Asuka Ogura and ran in Ciao from the May 2017 issue released on April 3, 2017 to the February 2018 issue released on January 3, 2018. As a side promotion to the series, the June 2017 issue of Ciao also distributed the Folk Sound Jewel as one of its furoku (magazine gifts). Idol × Warrior Miracle Tunes! Yume no Harmony (アイドル×戦士ミラクルちゅーんず！ゆめのハーモニー) was illustrated by Yuuki Harami and ran in Pucchigumi from the May 2017 issue to the April 2018 issue.

=== Novel ===
A novelization written by Kana Matsui, one of the show's screenwriters, was released on March 22, 2017, with illustrations provided by Asuka Ogura.

=== Video game ===
A video game developed by FuRyu titled Miracle Tunes! Game de Tune Up! da Pun! (ミラクルちゅーんず！ ゲームでチューンアップ！だプン！) for the Nintendo 3DS was announced in August 2017. It was released as both a physical copy and on the Nintendo 3DS eShop on November 9, 2017. Kanon's Idol Warrior outfit was made available in the arcade game PriPara for the characters Michiru, Nino, Mirei, Laala, Yui, and Sophy through a card exclusively released in Pucchigumi on August 12, 2017.

=== Remake ===
An Italian remake for European audiences began airing on October 13, 2018. The main cast consists of Giulia Sara Salemi, Emily Shaqiri, and Jasmine Roberta Molinaro. Later additions to the main cast include Lavinia Mantegazza and Giulia Izzo. The supporting cast includes Raul Navarro, Josep Ma Riera, Yuna Miralles, Angelo Pintus, Michelle Hunziker, Leonardo Decarli, and Greta Pierotti. Roberto Cenci signed on as the main director of the remake, stating that he believed that it would be "successful" in Europe and that the show in general gave "important messages" to children. Cenci put emphasis in singing and dancing in the show. The show was filmed in English before being dubbed into Italian and Spanish for other European countries, and one of the filming locations included Manises, Spain.

== Reception ==
Television ratings for Idol × Warrior Miracle Tunes! averaged 1% in nationwide viewership in Japan and about 5-10% of viewers from the target audience. In addition, the official social media accounts had only 6,000 followers. However, in spite of this, Confidence magazine and Oricon determined it started a "new genre" for shows aimed at the female toddler to primary school age demographic. 1,000 people appeared at the first toy event, and the toys were sold out during the Christmas season. The show received over 100,004,000 total views when it was first broadcast in China in July 2018.

The first DVD compilation box peaked at #19 on the Oricon Weekly DVD Chart and sold 1,444 copies in its first week. The third DVD compilation box peaked at #13 and sold 1,291 copies in its first week.

Idol × Warrior Miracle Tunes! was viewed as a new female counterpart to the Super Sentai series due to including female-oriented interests like Japanese idols, which were often seen in media targeted to young girls. Other editors at Real Sound believe the popularity of Idol × Warrior Miracle Tunes! came from the revived interest in live-action tokusatsu shows aimed at a female audience, which had declined in the early 1990s due to competing toy sales with Sailor Moon and growing interest in magical girl series in anime format.

Shogakukan project manager Reiko Sasaki stated that parents thought Idol × Warrior Miracle Tunes! was a new J-pop act at first, but the dancing and music had drawn in parents, after which viewership increased. Sumiko Kodama from Confidence noted that the show's integration of J-pop elements in collaboration with LDH also made the presentation easy for audiences of all ages to enjoy, as Miracle²'s real-life debut would remind older audiences of Speed. Eriko Ishii from Real Sound praised the show for paying attention to details that would make the show appealing to its main female demographic while comparing the music to Tetsuya Komuro and stating that parents who are drawn in by the J-pop appeal would also want to "cheer for them."

As for the music activities of the show's main cast, the music video for Miracle²'s debut song, "Catch Me!", amassed more than 5 million views on YouTube. "Catch Me!" also sold over 5,000 copies within the first week of sales, with 3,000 people attending the release event. Miracle Best: Complete Miracle² Songs sold over 31,000 copies, with 24,000 copies sold on its first week of release. A consecutive total of 3,000 people attended their final concert tour in March 2018, with a total of 1,500 people for each of their two shows.
