= Pretty Rhythm: All Star Selection =

Japanese media project

プリティーリズム・オールスターセレクション (Puritī Rizumu Ōru Sutā Serekushon)
- Genre: Sports (Figure skating)
- Video game

Pretty Rhythm: All Star Legend Coord Edition
- Developer: syn Sophia
- Publisher: Takara Tomy
- Genre: Rhythm game
- Platform: Arcade
- Released: JP: April 17, 2014
- Anime film

Pretty Rhythm: All Star Selection: Prism Show Best Ten
- Directed by: Masakazu Hishida
- Studio: Tatsunoko Production
- Released: March 8, 2014
- Runtime: 49 minutes
- Anime television series
- Directed by: Masakazu Hishida
- Studio: Tatsunoko Production
- Original network: TV Tokyo
- Original run: April 5, 2014 – June 14, 2014
- Episodes: 11
- Anime television series

Pretty All Friends Selection
- Directed by: Masakazu Hishida
- Studio: Tatsunoko Production
- Original network: TV Tokyo
- Original run: June 6, 2021 – September 19, 2021
- Episodes: 16
- See also
- Pretty Rhythm: Aurora Dream (2011); Pretty Rhythm: Dear My Future (2012); Pretty Rhythm: Rainbow Live (2013); PriPara (2014)

Pretty Rhythm: All Star Selection (プリティーリズム・オールスターセレクション, Puritī Rizumu Ōru Sutā Serekushon) is a 2014 Japanese media project produced by Tatsunoko Production and Avex Pictures in cooperation with Takara Tomy and Syn Sophia. The series is part of the Pretty Rhythm franchise and its fourth animated series, focusing on a group of Japanese idols known as "Prism Stars" that combine song and dance with fashion and figure skating.

Pretty Rhythm: All Star Selection is a compilation series of the previous three animated series, Pretty Rhythm: Aurora Dream, Pretty Rhythm: Dear My Future, and Pretty Rhythm: Rainbow Live. The series introduces Laala Manaka, the main character of Pretty Rhythm's spin-off franchise PriPara. The media project consists of a tie-in arcade game titled Pretty Rhythm: All-Star Legend Coord Edition, an animated film, a manga series, and a television anime series.

== Media ==
=== Film ===
Pretty Rhythm: All Star Selection: Prism Show Best Ten was announced in December 2013, and it was later released theaters nationwide in Japan on March 8, 2014. The film was animated by Tatsunoko Production and 10 Gauge, with Deko Akao as the scriptwriter. A Prism Stone compatible with the Pretty Rhythm arcade games was distributed as a limited edition theater gift. Prizmmy performed at certain screenings of the film.

The film is a summary of the top 10 performances from the Pretty Rhythm anime franchise, with characters from Pretty Rhythm: Aurora Dream, Pretty Rhythm: Dear My Future, and Pretty Rhythm: Rainbow Live appearing. Promotional material stated that a new character would be introduced in the film. Laala Manaka's From PriPara identity was kept a secret until the film was released in theaters.

=== Game ===
Beginning April 17, 2014, the Pretty Rhythm: Rainbow Live Duo arcade game was retitled Pretty Rhythm: All Star Legend Coord Edition (プリティーリズム・オールスターレジェンドコーデ編) with 84 new Prism Stones produced. It is the final version of the Pretty Rhythm arcade game series and ended services in July 2014.

=== Manga ===
A manga adaptation illustrated by Michiyo Kikuta began serializing in the April 2014 issue of Pucchigumi.

=== Anime ===
Pretty Rhythm: All Star Selection premiered on April 5, 2014, at TV Tokyo's 10 AM slot and ended on June 14, 2014. The series is a rebroadcast of select episodes from Pretty Rhythm: Aurora Dream, Pretty Rhythm: Dear My Future, and Pretty Rhythm: Rainbow Live. Each episode is preceded by a short animated segment where Aira Harune, Mia Ageha, and Naru Ayase give advice to aspiring Japanese idol and PriPara heroine Laala Manaka on ways to shine on stage.

No.	Title	Original release date
1	"The Requirements of a Star"; Transliteration: "Sutā no Jōken" (Japanese: スタアの条件)	April 5, 2014
In the Prism World, Aira Harune from Pretty Rhythm: Aurora Dream, Mia Ageha from Pretty Rhythm: Dear My Future and Naru Ayase from Pretty Rhythm: Rainbow Live appear. Suddenly, Laala Manaka from PriPara pops up from nowhere, which surprises them. Aira tells Laala the story of when she performed a Prism Show for the first time, following with a rebroadcast of episode 1 of Pretty Rhythm: Aurora Dream.
2	"How to Aim to Be the Best"; Transliteration: "Ichiban o Mezasu Tame ni Hitsuyō na Koto" (Japanese: 一番を目指す為に必要な事)	April 12, 2014
Mia tells Laala the story of when she interrupted MARs' Prism Show and challenged Aira, following with a rebroadcast of episode 1 of Pretty Rhythm: Dear My Future.
3	"The Essentials to Appeal Your Dream"; Transliteration: "Yume e no Apīru Hōhō" (Japanese: 夢ヘのアピール方法)	April 19, 2014
Naru tells Laala the story of when she applied to be the middle-school manager of Prism Stone, following with a rebroadcast of episode 1 of Pretty Rhythm: Rainbow Live.
4	"Rival Equals Friend"; Transliteration: "Raibaru Ikōru Tomodachi" (Japanese: ライバルイコール友達)	April 26, 2014
Mia tells Laala the story about her best friend and rival Hye-in, following with a rebroadcast of episode 46 of Pretty Rhythm: Dear My Future.
5	"A Rival is Important"; Transliteration: "Raibaru wa Daiji" (Japanese: ライバルは大事)	May 3, 2014
Aira tells Laala the story of how she came across two tough opponents at the Summer Queen Cup, following with a rebroadcast of episode 21 of Pretty Rhythm: Aurora Dream.
6	"Wall of My Heart"; Transliteration: "Jibun no Naka no Kabe" (Japanese: 自分の中の壁)	May 10, 2014
Naru tells Laala the story of how her friend Ann Fukuhara competed against Wakana Morizono at the Dreaming Session, following with a rebroadcast of episode 12 of Pretty Rhythm: Rainbow Live. Naru tells Laala to not be afraid to fail and break the wall of her heart.
7	"Your Side Makes Your Dreams Bloom"; Transliteration: "Yume no Sakase-kata" (Japanese: 夢の咲かせ方)	May 17, 2014
Mia tells Laala the story of how she met a girl who asked to be COSMOs' apprentice, following with a rebroadcast of episode 31 of Pretty Rhythm: Dear My Future. Mia tells Laala to not run away from her dreams.
8	"Be Myself"; Transliteration: "Jibunrashisa" (Japanese: 自分らしさ)	May 24, 2014
Naru tells Laala the story of when Bell Renjoji became the temporary manager of Prism Stone, following with a rebroadcast of episode 29 of Pretty Rhythm: Rainbow Live. Naru tells Laala to have self-confidence and to always be herself.
9	"My Dream"; Transliteration: "Watashi no Yume" (Japanese: 私の夢)	May 31, 2014
Aira tells Laala the story of the time she participated in the Prism Queen Cup with Rizumu Amamiya and Mion Takamine and won, following with a rebroadcast of episode 50 of Pretty Rhythm: Aurora Dream.
10	"My Best"; Transliteration: "Watashi no Ichiban" (Japanese: 私の一番)	June 7, 2014
Mia tells Laala the story of when she and her friends completed the Grateful Symphonia, following with a rebroadcast of episode 50 of Pretty Rhythm: Dear My Future.
11	"My Friends"; Transliteration: "Watashi no Nakama" (Japanese: 私の仲間)	June 14, 2014
Naru tells Laala the story of when the Prism Sparkle disappeared and it was up to her and her friends to restore it, following with a rebroadcast of episode 50 of Pretty Rhythm: Rainbow Live.
