= Girls × Heroine =

Japanese franchise

Girls X Heroine Series
- Created by: Takashi Miike
- Original work: Idol x Warrior Miracle Tunes!
- Years: 2017–2022

Films and television
- Television series: TV Tokyo

Miscellaneous
- Toy(s): Takara Tomy

Official website
- http://girls-heroine.jp/

The Girls × Heroine Series (ガールズ×戦士シリーズ, Gāruzu × Hiroin Shirīzu) is a Japanese tokusatsu franchise produced by TV Tokyo, Dentsu, OLM, Inc. and created by Takashi Miike. Each season revolves around magical girls who fight against enemies, with a toy line produced by Takara Tomy.

After Idol × Warrior Miracle Tunes! was first broadcast in April 2017 with success among its target demographic, four more series followed, grouped under the Girls × Heroine Series name. Following the series' ending, it was succeeded by RizSta -Top of Artists!-.

== Overview ==
Each season focuses on elementary school and middle school girls who are given magical items to fight against the forces of evil. They are assisted by fairy mascots and together must battle ordinary people who have been turned evil by the enemy. Their job is to purify these beings and to collect various things which helps them in the battle ahead. As the seasons go on, their magical powers get upgraded, enemies become stronger and along the way, they may gain more members who will assist them in their battles.

=== Main series ===
#	Title	Episodes		
#	Title	Episodes	First aired	Last aired
1	Idol × Warrior Miracle Tunes!	51	April 2, 2017	March 25, 2018
2	Magical × Heroine Magimajo Pures!	51	April 1, 2018	March 24, 2019
3	Secret × Heroine Phantomirage!	64	April 7, 2019	June 28, 2020
4	Police × Heroine Lovepatrina!	48	July 26, 2020	June 27, 2021
5	Bittomo × Heroine Kirameki Powers!	50	July 11, 2021	June 26, 2022

== Music ==
In 2019, a new girl group known as Girls² was announced. It was a combination group consisting of all three groups: Yuzuha from miracle²; Momoka, Misaki, Youka, and Kurea from magical²; Minami, Kira, and Toa from mirage². Later, Ran Ishii from mirage² also joined Girls². They provided the opening themes for Secret × Heroine Phantomirage! & Police × Heroine Lovepatrina!. In 2021, 'Lucky²' was announced, a combination unit of members from lovely² and the cast of Kirameki Powers. They will provide the opening for Bittomo × Heroine Kirameki Powers!.

- Miracle² – Idol × Warrior Miracle Tunes! (2017–2018)
- Magical² – Magical × Heroine MagimajoPures! (2018–2019)
- Mirage² – Secret × Heroine Phantomirage! Endings Theme (2019–2020)
- Lovely² – Police × Heroine Lovepatrina! Endings Theme (2020–2021)
- Girls² – permanent girl group providing films And Movie Songs (2019–present)
- Lucky² – permanent girl group providing opening and ending theme songs (2021–present)

== Reception ==
When Idol × Warrior Miracle Tunes! first aired, Confidence and Oricon determined it started a "new genre" for shows aimed at the female toddler to primary school age demographic. The series was viewed as a new female counterpart to the Ultraman, Kamen Rider & Super Sentai series due to including female-oriented interests, which were often seen in media targeted to young girls. Sumiko Kodama from Confidence also noted that the series' integration of J-pop elements in collaboration with LDH also made the presentation easy for audiences of all ages to enjoy, as real life debut of Miracle² would remind older audiences of Speed. Editors at Real Sound believe the popularity came from the revived interest in live-action tokusatsu shows aimed at female audiences, which had declined in the early 1990s due to competing toy sales with Sailor Moon and growing interest in Precure series The success of the show led to it being a direct competitor to other series for children, particularly the magical girl anime series.
