= Myeongnang manhwa =

Manhwa that is oriented towards children or all ages

- Hangul: 명랑만화
- Hanja: 明朗漫畫
- RR: myeongnang manhwa
- MR: myŏngnang manhwa

Myeongnang manhwa (Korean: 명랑만화; lit. bright manhwa) is a term for manhwa that is oriented towards children or all ages. They use sketched drawings and humor to evoke laughter and usually deal with positive/cheerful themes. This term was used since the 1960s.
