= Children's anime and manga =

Anime and manga directed at children

Children's manga (Japanese: 子供向け漫画, Hepburn: kodomo-muke manga) and children's anime (子供向けアニメ, kodomo-muke anime) refer to manga and anime directed towards pre-adolescent children. These series are usually moralistic, often educating children about staying in the right path in life. Each chapter is usually a self-contained story. An example of a notable children's anime is Doraemon.

== History ==
Manga aimed at children started in the late 19th century with the production of short manga, approximately 15 pages long, printed in magazines. These short manga were created as a part of the Meiji era's attempt to encourage literacy among Japanese youth. A major milestone in the popularity of anime was the creation of Astro Boy by Osamu Tezuka, who is often considered the father of anime.

Children's anime and manga can be divided into four categories. The first category consists of anime and manga adaptations of Western stories, such as World Masterpiece Theater. Most of them are TV series. Despite being popular, they are less representative of traditional Japanese anime. Instead, they are modeled after classical American or Soviet cartoons. The second category consists of adaptations of Japanese media and original works. They use linguistic gags, contain references to Japanese society, and may be harder to understand for non-Japanese audiences. They are in some ways similar to American animation. An example is Doraemon.

The third category, known as joji-muke (女児向け), consists of manga and anime aimed towards young girls, such as Hello Kitty. The fourth category, which is closer to shōnen, has connections with popular video game and toy franchises, and has the greatest commercial success. Manga magazines such as CoroCoro Comic, Saikyo Jump and Comic BomBom primarily target or targeted young boys, especially those in elementary school, though some, such as Pucchigumi, target young girls. Popular children's manga is often adapted into anime and accompanied by a plethora of merchandise.

== Awards ==
The annual Shogakukan Manga Award and Kodansha Manga Award each include a category for children's manga. The former first included a category for children's manga in 1981.

== See also ==
- Shōnen manga
- Shōjo manga
- Seinen manga
- Josei manga
- Myungrang manhwa
