= Gaim Gaiden =

Japanese film series

Gaim Gaiden (鎧武外伝, Gaimu Gaiden; "Gaim Side Story") is a series of Toei's V-Cinema (direct-to-video) films and web release that focus on various characters in the Kamen Rider Gaim television series and films. All of the original cast members reprise their roles, and the films introduce brand new characters along the way.

The first in the series was released on April 22, 2015, and features Yuki Kubota in his role as Takatora Kureshima, Kamen Rider Zangetsu, and Yutaka Kobayashi as Kaito Kumon, Kamen Rider Baron. Osamu Kaneda directed the films written by Jin Haganeya (Zangetsu) and Nobuhiro Mouri (Baron). Customers who pre-ordered the film were given a link to a website where they could vote on who they would like to see in a second installment in the series. Shortly after the release of Gaim Gaiden: Kamen Rider Zangetsu/Kamen Rider Baron, Toei announced the winners of the ballot. Gaim Gaiden: Kamen Rider Duke/Kamen Rider Knuckle was released on November 11, 2015, and features Tsunenori Aoki as Ryoma Sengoku, Kamen Rider Duke, and Gaku Matsuda as Zack, Kamen Rider Knuckle. Once again, Kaneda directed while Haganeya (Duke) and Mouri (Knuckle) wrote the screenplays. Once again, customers who pre-ordered the film were given a ballot, opening up the voting for the third set of Gaim Gaiden films. Gaim Gaiden: Kamen Rider Gridon vs. Kamen Rider Bravo was released on Toei Tokusatsu Fan Club on October 25, 2020. The web release comprises two episodes and features Ryo Matsuda as Hideyasu Jonouchi, Kamen Rider Gridon, and Metal Yoshida as Oren Pierre Alfonzo, Kamen Rider Bravo. Satoshi Morota directed the web release written by Mouri.

== Gaim Gaiden: Kamen Rider Zangetsu/Kamen Rider Baron ==
=== Kamen Rider Zangetsu ===
Takatora Kureshima is continuing preparations of Project Ark, which would mean the salvation of humanity at the cost of numerous lives. Takatora's resolve in seeing this through is put in question after a conversation with Kota Kazuraba.

Meanwhile, Yggdrasill's Kurokage Troopers are being assailed by an unknown Armored Rider. The caretaker formerly employed by the Kureshima family, Tōka Akatsuki, makes an appearance. Being raised by a strict father, Takatora's only support during his childhood years was Tōka. Both are very happy to meet again, but on a depressing note as the Kureshima brothers learn that their father had died. However, the mysterious attacker, using the Ringo Lockseed, leaves Sid injured and Yoko to be on the defensive. The mysterious Rider sets their sights on Mitsuzane Kureshima and Takatora loses his Melon Energy Lockseed as a result. While searching for clues, he uncovers the truth of his father's past and learns that the people at Zawame Child Care Facility were subjugated to lethal experiments to allow passage into Helheim. Among the list of people in the orphanage is Tōka and Takatora puts one and one together. Confronting Tōka while using the Watermelon Lockseed given by Ryoma Sengoku, he tells Tōka that he will continue to do what he believes in, even if he lays down his life for it. He defeats Tōka after he regains the Melon Energy Lockseed. However, he is unable to kill Tōka due to their past.

Tōka retreats back to the abandoned orphanage, after being spared by Takatora and don't understand that why a good man like Takatora carries a name of Kureshima. Shortly, Tōka experiences the side effects of the Ringo Lockseed and learns that Ryoma Sengoku was also raised at the orphanage before being killed by Ryoma, who promptly retakes the Ringo Lockseed. After cleaning the Kureshima residents with Mitsuzane, Takatora start to think about Kota's word about saving humanity without sacrifices, and perhaps he may use one of Kota's heroic influence a bit.

=== Kamen Rider Baron ===
While Kaito Kumon hunted for the Overlords during his alliance with Ryoma Sengoku, a foreign prince named Shapool visits Zawame as part of an inspection. Shapool finds Kaito to be identical him, having the latter sedated so he can switch places with him. While Kota and the Beat Riders were flabbergasted in "Kaito" actually smiling before he takes Mai to Charmant, the real Kaito finds himself taken by a group led by Shapool's butler Alfred. Alfred then deduces Kaito's identity, contacting to Oren to take care of him. By the time Kaito finds Shapool, the two are attacked by Alfred who threatens to kill Shapool while transforming into Kamen Rider Tyrant. Kaito protects Shapool and learns of his story, as well as sharing his own story with the prince. After finding out that Alfred has taken Zack, Kaito goes after Alfred. As both were transformed and battled each other as Baron and Tyrant respectively, Tyrant unexpectedly corrupted by the Energy Lockseed possessing Helheim's manipulation and became an Overlord Inves.

Yoko later came in and gives Kaito the Ringo Lockseed she took from Ryoma. Though warned that it could turn him into an Overlord, Kaito uses the Lockseed to fight back as Baron Ringo Arms and defeats Tyrant with the Cavaliend Rider Kick before destroying the Ringo Lockseed. In the end, Shapool writes a letter to thank Kaito for saving him from Alfred's threats and taking what Kaito has taught him, to believe in friends and to fight for what is right, before he leaves Zawame City for reuniting with his father. Kaito went to his parents' tomb at a cemetery, and later walks out as the flowers were left onto his parents' tomb. However, though he did not become an Overlord at that time, the event is still within Kaito's future.

=== Cast ===
Kamen Rider Zangetsu

- Takatora Kureshima (呉島 貴虎, Kureshima Takatora): Yuki Kubota (久保田 悠来, Kubota Yūki)
- Tōka Akatsuki (朱月 藤果, Akatsuki Tōka): Sayuri Iwata (岩田 さゆり, Iwata Sayuri)
- Mitsuzane Kureshima (呉島 光実, Kureshima Mitsuzane): Mahiro Takasugi (高杉 真宙, Takasugi Mahiro)
- Takatora Kureshima (teen): Ryūto (竜跳)
- Mitsuzane Kureshima (child): Wataru Nishioka (西岡 航, Nishioka Wataru)
- Tōka Akatsuki (teen): Ai Uchida (内田 愛, Uchida Ai)
- Sid (シド, Shido): Kazuki Namioka (波岡 一喜, Namioka Kazuki)
- Amagi Kureshima (呉島 天樹, Kureshima Amagi): Minori Terada (寺田 農, Terada Minori)

Kamen Rider Baron

- Kaito Kumon (駆紋 戒斗, Kumon Kaito), Shapool (シャプール, Shapūru): Yutaka Kobayashi (小林 豊, Kobayashi Yutaka)
- Alfred (アルフレッド, Arufureddo): Gamon Kaai (河相 我聞, Kaai Gamon)
- Mai Takatsukasa (高司 舞, Takatsukasa Mai): Yuumi Shida (志田 友美, Shida Yūmi)
- Zack (ザック, Zakku): Gaku Matsuda (松田 岳, Matsuda Gaku)
- Peko (ペコ): Saku Momose (百瀬 朔, Momose Saku)
- Hideyasu Jonouchi (城乃内 秀保, Jōnouchi Hideyasu): Ryo Matsuda (松田 凌, Matsuda Ryō)
- Oren Pierre Alfonso (凰蓮・ピエール・アルフォンゾ, Ōren Piēru Arufonzo): Metal Yoshida (吉田 メタル, Yoshida Metaru)
- Kaito's father: Akira Matsushita (松下 哲, Matsushita Akira)
- Kaito's mother: Keiko Takemitsu (竹光 桂子, Takemitsu Keiko)
- Kaito Kumon (child): Kurando Katayama (片山 蔵人, Katayama Kurando)

Both Kamen Rider Zangetsu and Kamen Rider Baron

- Ryoma Sengoku (戦極 凌馬, Sengoku Ryōma): Tsunenori Aoki (青木 玄徳, Aoki Tsunenori)
- Yoko Minato (湊 耀子, Minato Yōko): Minami Tsukui (佃井 皆美, Tsukui Minami)
- Kouta Kazuraba (葛葉 紘汰, Kazuraba Kōta): Gaku Sano (佐野 岳, Sano Gaku)
- Sengoku Driver Equipment Voice (戦極ドライバー関連アイテム音声, Sengoku Doraibā Kanren Aitemu Onsei): Seiji Hiratoko (平床 政治, Hiratoko Seiji)
- Genesis Driver Equipment Voice (ゲネシスドライバー関連アイテム音声, Geneshisu Doraibā Kanren Aitemu Onsei): Shin-ichiro Miki (三木 眞一郎, Miki Shinichirō)

=== Theme songs ===
Kamen Rider Zangetsu insert theme

- "Lights of my wish"
  - Lyrics: Shoko Fujibayashi
  - Composition: Ryo (of defspiral)
  - Arrangement: Ryo (of defspiral), Junichi "IGAO" Igarashi
  - Artist: Mai Takatsukasa (Yuumi Shida)

Kamen Rider Baron ending theme

- "Unperfected world"
  - Lyrics: Shoko Fujibayashi
  - Composition & Arrangement: Ryo (of defspiral)
  - Artist: Kaito Kumon (Yutaka Kobayashi)

== Gaim Gaiden: Kamen Rider Duke/Kamen Rider Knuckle ==
=== Kamen Rider Duke ===
Set before the events of Kamen Rider × Kamen Rider Gaim & Wizard: The Fateful Sengoku Movie Battle, Ryoma Sengoku continues his research of the Sengoku Drivers along with Takatora Kureshima. Takatora thinks that the lives of humanity is their main priority, but Ryoma dislikes his way of thinking of increasing the production of Sengoku Drivers, with cost as the main priority than efficiency. Meanwhile, Sid and Yoko investigate suicide attacks that have been taking place on Yggdrasill Corporation employees. The mastermind of these incidents is the Black Linden cult, led by Ryoma's former colleague Kugai Kudo who was thought to have died in a Sengoku Driver testing accident. Ryoma must figure out a way to stop Kudo once and for all, while still trying to perfect the next generation version of the Sengoku Drivers. He and Takatora battle Kudo as Kamen Rider Duke and Kamen Rider Zangetsu, respectively, who fights them as the evil Kamen Rider Saver, and after beating him, Ryoma later uses his technology to perfect the Genesis Driver and its Sonic Arrow weaponry, which he uses against Kudo's ghost to send him off once and for all.

=== Kamen Rider Knuckle ===
Set after the events of Kamen Rider × Kamen Rider Drive & Gaim: Movie War Full Throttle, it has been one year since Kouta and Mai left the Earth and Kaito died, and peace has returned to Zawame City once more. Zack departs for New York to participate in a dance competition, leaving Peko in charge of Team Baron. However, upon arriving in New York, Peko's sister calls Zack to tell him Peko has been kidnapped by Shura, a member of Team Baron who Kaito kicked out for not following the team's ideals. Zack returns to Zawame to fight Shura, who can transform into Kamen Rider Black Baron, but Zack is given a new Sengoku Driver and set of Lockseeds from Mitsuzane to fight once more as Kamen Rider Knuckle, but this time as the more powerful Jimber Marron Arms.

=== Cast ===
Kamen Rider Duke

- Ryoma Sengoku: Tsunenori Aoki
- Takatora Kureshima: Yuki Kubota
- Yoko Minato: Minami Tsukui
- Sid: Kazuki Namioka
- Kugai Kudo (狗道 供界, Kudō Kugai): Jun Toba (鳥羽 潤, Toba Jun)

Kamen Rider Knuckle

- Zack: Gaku Matsuda
- Peko: Saku Momose
- Azami (アザミ): Maari (麻亜里)
- Mitsuzane Kureshima: Mahiro Takasugi
- Mai Takatsukasa: Yuumi Shida
- Hideyasu Jonouchi: Ryo Matsuda
- Ryoji Hase (初瀬 亮二, Hase Ryōji): Atsushi Shiramata (白又 敦, Shiramata Atsushi)
- Chucky (チャッキー, Chakkī): Kanon Hanakage (花影 香音, Hanakage Kanon; Lucky Color's)
- Rica (リカ, Rika): Miina Yamakawa (山川 未菜, Yamakawa Miina; Lucky Color's)
- Rat (ラット, Ratto): Ren Ozawa (小澤 廉, Ozawa Ren)
- Oren Pierre Alfonso: Metal Yoshida
- Kaito Kumon: Yutaka Kobayashi

Both Kamen Rider Duke and Kamen Rider Knuckle

- Shura (シュラ): Ryusuke Nakamura (中村 龍介, Nakamura Ryūsuke)
- Sengoku Driver Equipment Voice: Seiji Hiratoko
- Genesis Driver Equipment Voice: Shin-ichiro Miki

=== Theme song ===
Kamen Rider Knuckle ending theme

- "Dance With Me"
  - Lyrics: Shoko Fujibayashi
  - Composition: Chikara Gonohe
  - Arrangement: ats-
  - Artist: Team Baron (Zack, Peco, & Kaito Kumon) (Gaku Matsuda, Saku Momose, & Yutaka Kobayashi)

== Gaim Gaiden: Kamen Rider Gridon vs. Kamen Rider Bravo ==
The timeline takes place after the novel storyline of Kamen Rider Gaim and the stage-play Zangetsu -Gaim Gaiden-, and prior to Kamen Rider Revice: The Mystery.

=== Episode 1 ===
Sometimes after Jonouchi becoming a star pâtissier succeeding Oren, he is overcame by an ego of his newfound popularity, much to Oren's dismay. Oren, who now retires to return as a mercenary is enlisted by Takatora to investigate the re-appearance of Helheim's fruits, suspecting the source coming from Jonouchi.

On the next day, Oren learn from Jonouchi about a new source of fruit for a new cake, but ashamed of his student haven't researched about an unidentified fruit yet. While leaving, Oren is attacked by Armored Rider Gridon, who immediately left before Oren transform. Believing that Gridon is Jonouchi, Oren gears up, and sent a challenge message to Jonouchi. Jonouchi's secretary, Masako Suzuka does not want Jonouchi to waste time with Oren's challenge, but he accept it anyway, thinking he might be jealous of being surpassed by his student.

Arriving at a port as what Oren asked Jonouchi to meet him there, Oren destroys Jonouchi's car and transform into Armored Rider Bravo to teach Jonouchi a lesson and re-correct the path of pâtissier he thought he abandoned it. However, the Helheim crack somehow appears behind Bravo and corrupt him into a mindless Bravo King Durian Arms. Thankfully, Jonouchi and Suzuka are saved by the same Armored Rider Gridon who attacked Oren. The said Armored Rider Gridon is revealed to be Takatora in disguise.

=== Episode 2 ===
Jonouchi goes to find out why the other Gridon, a disguised Takatora shows up, telling Masako to stay behind. Once a mindless Bravo is distracted into attacking three innocent workers, Takatora reveals to Jonouchi why he persuaded Oren into hunting the latter, a scape goat who is unknowingly being used by someone into using Helheim's fruit for evil, relating to a new fruit Jonouchi found without constant research to develop Charmant's new fruit cakes. Because a now mindless Bravo needs to be stopped by Jonouchi's hand, Takatora gives the Gridon's Sengoku Driver he borrowed to persuade Jonouchi out of retirement from fighting one last time.

While both Gridon and Bravo are fighting, Takatora found out that Masako had been manipulating Jonouchi into unknowingly using Helheim's fruits for Charmant's new fruit cake. As her cover is blown, Masako reveal herself as an Armored Rider who can control Helheim out of knowhere, Armored Rider Sylphi. Takatora immediately transform into Zangetsu Kachidoki Arms to prevent Slyphi furthering her evil plan.

Just as Takatora experienced against Bravo King Durian Arms while as Gridon, Jonouchi is also unmatched against the Lockseed's power and had his Donguri Lockseed destroyed. When Sylphi's Helheim plants pierce into the warehouse and unknowingly knocks back Bravo, Jonouchi attempt to transform the passing by Helheim fruit into a Lockseed while his Driver still intact, but somehow no avail. At a brick of despair, Jonouchi was about to eat the fruit with no other option, but was prevented by the spirit of Hase, who transform the fruit into a Lychee Lockseed, allowing Gridon to achieve Lychee Arms and evenly matches King Durian's strength.

Once Gridon freed Bravo from Sylphi's corruption and purifying King Durian's power, both student and master reconcile each other. Around the same time, Zangetsu eliminates Sylphi. Due to his master's sustain injury from the battle, Jonouchi carries him home until sunset.

=== Cast ===
- Hideyasu Jonouchi: Ryo Matsuda
- Oren Pierre Alfonso: Metal Yoshida
- Masako Suzuka (鈴鹿 まさこ, Suzuka Masako): Tomomi Jiena Sumi (鷲見 友美 ジェナ, Sumi Tomomi Jena; Kamen Rider Girls)
- Ryoji Hase: Atsushi Shiramata
- Takatora Kureshima: Yuki Kubota
- Sengoku Driver Equipment Voice: Seiji Hiratoko

=== Theme song ===
- "You are the HERO"
  - Lyrics & Composition: Shock Eye
  - Arrangement: Masashi Kusano
  - Artist: Shock Eye from Gaim no Kaze (鎧武乃風, Gaimu no Kaze)
