= Kamen Rider Gaim: Great Soccer Battle! Golden Fruits Cup! =

Kamen Rider Gaim the Movie Great Soccer Battle! Golden Fruits Cup!
- Theatrical poster

Japanese name
- Kanji: 劇場版 仮面ライダー鎧武 サッカー大決戦!黄金の果実争奪杯（カップ）!
Transcriptions
- Revised Hepburn: Gekijōban Kamen Raidā Gaimu Sakkā Daikessen! Ōgon no Kajitsu Sōdatsu Kappu!
- Directed by: Osamu Kaneda
- Written by: Jin Haganeya
- Based on: Kamen Rider Gaim by Gen Urobuchi
- Starring: Gaku Sano; Yutaka Kobayashi; Mahiro Takasugi; Yuumi Shida; Yuki Kubota; Kataoka Ainosuke VI
- Cinematography: Koji Kurata
- Edited by: Naoki Osada
- Music by: Kousuke Yamashita
- Production company: Toei
- Release date: July 19, 2014 (Japan)
- Running time: 65 minutes
- Country: Japan
- Language: Japanese
- Box office: US$8.4 million

Kamen Rider Gaim the Movie: Great Soccer Battle! Golden Fruits Cup! (劇場版 仮面ライダー鎧武 サッカー大決戦!黄金の果実争奪杯（カップ）!, Gekijōban Kamen Raidā Gaimu Sakkā Daikessen! Ōgon no Kajitsu Sōdatsu Kappu!) is a 2014 Japanese film, serving as the film adaptation of the 2013-2014 Kamen Rider television series Kamen Rider Gaim. It was released on July 19, 2014, in a double billing with Ressha Sentai ToQger the Movie: Galaxy Line S.O.S. Nitroplus writer Jin Haganeya wrote the script which features the heroes and villains of Kamen Rider Gaim entering an alternate world where instead of forming dance troupes, they play soccer. The film features cameo appearances by J. League soccer players and guest stars Kataoka Ainosuke VI as the film's antagonist Kogane.

The film introduces Kamen Riders Mars, Kamuro, Gaim Yami, & Kurokage Shin.

== Plot ==
Kota fights off a pack of Inves in the now Helheim flora-invaded Zawame City alone. There, he runs into a boy who asks him about soccer. Kota, demonstrating the goal of Soccer and how it's a way of demonstrating your strength while allowing the losing side to improve and having the chance to also wins enlightens the boy. The boy then creates his own ideal world - a "dream" world that is a separate dimension from the original Zawame, focusing on the sport of Soccer.

As the boy teleports from place to place, Kota is lured into a destroyed stadium. But upon further inspection, he hears chants of what appears to be a crowd and upon entering, he sees spectators everywhere. Kota is informed of the situation from Mai about the All Rider Cup and Kota changes into uniform. Defeating Team Baron, Team Gaim wins, moving one step closer to the All Rider Cup as well as what is rumored to be the power to grant any wish, the Golden Fruit. Peko, upset that Team Baron is lost is bitten by a dark grasshopper that landed on his back.

Kota realizes that this world is not the Zawame he is familiar with as Hase, Sid, Takatora, and Yuya are alive and well. He also realizes that the word Inves and Helheim are unknown meanings in this world. Kota also runs into the young boy from earlier who reveals that his name is Lapis. However, when Kota tries to ask more questions, Lapis disappears in thin air. Mitsuzane discovers that his brother is alive and has a wife, causing Mitsuzane to remember the discrepancies in front of him with memories of his time in the original world. This memory conflict causes him to go undercover to discover the truth.

At Team Baron's loft, Peko, who envied both Kaito and Zack, starts to ramble about wanting the Golden Fruit before transforming into Kurokage Shin with a Genesis Driver to attack Zack. Kaito intervenes, but Peko is mysteriously enveloped in what appears to be Helheim vines and is reduced to nothing with his Matsubokkuri Energy Armor Part retracting back into the Matsubokkuri Energy Lockseed. Kaito spotted Lapis watching and disappears. Elsewhere, a rusted Lockseed recovers its golden color.

Meanwhile, at Charmant, Hase starts to attack Jonouchi, wanting more power and transforms into Kurokage attacking even Oren. However, the same Helheim vines envelops Hase and he too is reduced to nothing with his Matsubokkuri Armor Part retracting back into his Lockseed. Kota, appearing at Charmant realizes that Lapis was watching from afar. Catching up to Lapis with Kaito and Zack, Zack blames Lapis for Peko's death and attacks Lapis, but is also enveloped in Helheim veins before being reduced to nothing as well. His Kurumi Armor Part retracts back into the Kurumi Lockseed afterwards. Kaito calls out Lapis, but is unable to find him.

Elsewhere, Oren calls out one of the Armored Riders who he believes is behind the disappearances of his allies and rivals. At the Yggdrasill Corporation, Sid is attacked by Takatora, who realizes that the former has been plotting to betray him. The two fight on top of an elevator shaft with Zangetsu Shin knocking Sigurd off the platform with Sid being enveloped in Helheim vines before being reduced to nothing. His Cherry Energy Armor Part retracts back into the Cherry Energy Lockseed. Mitsuzane finds a recording left by Ryoma Sengoku who had been attempting to experiment on an artifact that he found.

Oren and Jonouchi rallies among his private militia against Takatora and the Kurokage Troopers resulting in a battle that destroys Zawame City. Kaito also enters the battle and Jonouchi is killed by Takatora. Oren, Takatora, and Kaito all activate their Driver finishers with Takatora and Oren dying while Yoko Minato saves Kaito and throws his Banana Lockseed onto the ground to give the illusion to the culprit that Kaito had fallen. Lapis, watching from afar is confronted by Mitsuzane, however Sagara appears before them explaining what is happening and how Kota is in danger.

Kota at the outskirts of where Zawame City was unaffected is confronted by Yuya, who asks why Kota isn't yearning for the Golden Fruit like the other Armored Riders. Mai follows Kota, but Kota stops Mai from going to Yuya's side by revealing that Yuya isn't really Yuya. Kota reveals that he found it weird how he was Gaim in this world if Yuya was always the original intended user for Kota's Sengoku Driver. Yuya stated that Kota was the best choice. Kota asks Yuya why does he have a Lockseed if the Lockseed's purpose is to be used alongside a Driver. Yuya then says he needs it to protect himself from Inves. Kota, now confirming his theory tells Mai that this man isn't Yuya. Yuya turns into Kogane and calls himself the "God of the New Generation" using the Golden Ringo Lockseed to transform into Armored Rider Mars before attacking Kota. Mai flees with Kota and Kogane fighting inside the destroyed Zawame. Kota finds the Lockseeds of Takatora, Oren, Jonouchi, and Kaito, swapping between Banana Arms, Donguri Arms, and Durian Arms against Kogane. However, Kota gains the upper advantage on Kogane with Jimber Lemon Arms causing Kogane to use Yuya's appearance to lower Kota's guard. Kota is enveloped by the Helheim vines with Kogane being angered that Kota wasn't fully consumed.

Mai runs around the wreckage of the now destroyed Zawame to find Kota. She becomes relieved when she sees him, but Mitsuzane tells Mai that Kota has already fallen. Transforming into Ryugen against Kota's "Black Jimber Lemon Arms", he is easily defeated. Mai notices Lapis and the two are confronted by Kota. However, Yoko Minato and Kaito appear to join the fight, but the two are easily defeated by both Kota and Kogane. Lapis reveals to Mai that his real name is Shamubishe and he is what they call an "Overlord". Lapis enters Kota's mind revealing to him that they're not so different, that they had the same goals while showing him his memories of Demushu, Redyue, and Rosyuo. Lapis reveals to Kota that he's not in Zawame, but rather a world that he created that is like a dream - it's not connected to Zawame and that the Helheim threat is still real and active. Kota breaks free of his brainwashing and confronts Kogane telling him that "there is no real gold in you". Kogane is overpowered by Gaim Kachidoki Arms and transfers all the Armored RIders into a desolate wasteland.

Lapis, encouraged by Kota's strength and his will to never give up, conjured a horse for him to use. Kota transforms into Kiwami Arms. Kogane and Kota clash with Kota managing to defeat Mars in his Flame Horse form, reviving the Riders that he considered his allies (Sid and Ryoma were never considered his allies or friends). Lapis is then given a Silver Ringo Lockseed by Sagara and the remaining Armored Riders transform into their respective forms. Kogane is destroyed by a Rider Kick from Kota and the world starts to fall apart.

Lapis expresses his gratitude towards Kota and tells him he can finally “rest”, and then he disappears. Kota, back in the half destroyed Zawame, says goodbye to Lapis and promises to save this Zawame as well. Deep in the Helheim forest, the wind blows to reveal Kamuro's spear and Lapis’ bracelet, rusting, appearing as if they've been there for a long period of time. Along with those items, a soccer ball stays idle near them.

== Cast ==
- Kota Kazuraba (葛葉 紘汰, Kazuraba Kōta): Gaku Sano (佐野 岳, Sano Gaku)
- Kaito Kumon (駆紋 戒斗, Kumon Kaito): Yutaka Kobayashi (小林 豊, Kobayashi Yutaka)
- Mitsuzane Kureshima (呉島 光実, Kureshima Mitsuzane): Mahiro Takasugi (高杉 真宙, Takasugi Mahiro)
- Mai Takatsukasa (高司 舞, Takatsukasa Mai): Yuumi Shida (志田 友美, Shida Yūmi)
- Takatora Kureshima (呉島 貴虎, Kureshima Takatora): Yuki Kubota (久保田 悠来, Kubota Yūki)
- Zack (ザック, Zakku): Gaku Matsuda (松田 岳, Matsuda Gaku)
- Peko (ペコ): Saku Momose (百瀬 朔, Momose Saku)
- Hideyasu Jonouchi (城乃内 秀保, Jōnouchi Hideyasu): Ryo Matsuda (松田 凌, Matsuda Ryō)
- Ryoji Hase (初瀬 亮二, Hase Ryōji): Atsushi Shiramata (白又 敦, Shiramata Atsushi)
- Ryoma Sengoku (戦極 凌馬, Sengoku Ryōma): Tsunenori Aoki (青木 玄徳, Aoki Tsunenori)
- Yoko Minato (湊 耀子, Minato Yōko): Minami Tsukui (佃井 皆美, Tsukui Minami)
- Chucky (チャッキー, Chakkī): Kanon Tsuyama (津山 香音, Tsuyama Kanon; Lucky Color's)
- Rica (リカ, Rika): Miina Yokota (横田 美菜, Yokota Miina; Lucky Color's)
- Yuya Sumii (角居 裕也, Sumii Yūya): Hiromi Sakimoto (崎本 大海, Sakimoto Hiromi)
- Lapis (ラピス, Rapisu): Taketo Tanaka (田中 偉登, Tanaka Taketo)
- Kiyojiro Bando (阪東 清治郎, Bandō Kiyojirō): Tomohisa Yuge (弓削 智久, Yuge Tomohisa)
- Oren Pierre Alfonso (凰蓮・ピエール・アルフォンゾ, Ōren Piēru Arufonzo): Metal Yoshida (吉田 メタル, Yoshida Metaru)
- Sid (シド, Shido): Kazuki Namioka (波岡 一喜, Namioka Kazuki)
- DJ Sagara (DJサガラ, Dī Jei Sagara): Tomomitsu Yamaguchi (山口 智充, Yamaguchi Tomomitsu)
- Kogane (コウガネ, Kōgane): Kataoka Ainosuke VI (六代目 片岡 愛之助, Rokudaime Kataoka Ainosuke)
- Yūto Satō (佐藤 勇人, Satō Yūto)
- Yūichi Komano (駒野 友一, Komano Yūichi)
- Masashi Nakayama (中山 雅史, Nakayama Masashi)
- Citizen of Zawame (沢芽市民, Zawame Shimin): Mitsuru Karahashi (唐橋 充, Karahashi Mitsuru), Hiroya Matsumoto (松本 寛也, Matsumoto Hiroya)
- Takashi Kitadai (北代 高士, Kitadai Takashi)
- Yugo Fujii (藤井 祐伍, Fujii Yūgo)
- Hiroshi Doki (どうき ひろし, Dōki Hiroshi)
- Yui Natsuki (那月 結衣, Natsuki Yui)
- Dēmushu (デェムシュ; Voice): Tomokazu Sugita (杉田 智和, Sugita Tomokazu)
- Redyue (レデュエ; Voice): Kenjiro Tsuda (津田 健次郎, Tsuda Kenjirō)
- Roshuo (ロシュオ; Voice): Jōji Nakata (中田 譲治, Nakata Jōji)
- Sengoku Driver Equipment Voice: Seiji Hiratoko (平床 政治, Hiratoko Seiji)
- Genesis Driver Equipment Voice: Shin-ichiro Miki (三木 眞一郎, Miki Shinichirō)

== Theme song ==
- "YOUR SONG"
  - Lyrics: Shoko Fujibayashi
  - Composition & Arrangement: Shuhei Naruse
  - Artist: Gaimu no Kaze (鎧武乃風, Gaimu no Kaze)

As they have done for the TV series, Shōnan no Kaze have recorded the track "YOUR SONG" to serve as the film's theme song under the name "Gaimu no Kaze".

== Reception ==
As of July 25, 2014, The Kamen Rider Gaim: Great Soccer Battle! Golden Fruits Cup! and Ressha Sentai ToQGer the Movie: Galaxy Line SOS opened in 309 theaters in Japan and has sold 138,528 tickets. It's estimated that both films earned a total of 1,698,358 yen in its first week.
