= Yuki Kubota =

Japanese actor and model (born 1981)

- Born: June 15, 1981 (age 45); Hiratsuka, Kanagawa Prefecture, Japan
- Occupations: Actor, model
- Years active: 2002 - present (model); 2007 - present (actor)
- Height: 180 cm (5 ft 11 in)

Yuki Kubota (久保田 悠来, Kubota Yūki; born June 15, 1981, in Hiratsuka, Kanagawa Prefecture, Japan) is a Japanese actor and model whose work has included stage, television and film roles. He is best known as the character Takatora Kureshima / Kamen Rider Zangetsu / Kamen Rider Zangetsu Shin in the Kamen Rider series Kamen Rider Gaim. He is currently affiliated with the Japan Music Entertainment agency.

== Career ==
Kubota debuted as a magazine model in 2002 after being scouted in Harajuku. In 2007, he made his theatrical debut as Hal Kurabayashi in the stage play Switch, based on the manga of the same name. Also in the same year he got small roles in TV series such as Oniyome Nikki and Jotei, as well as a brief appearance in Kamen Rider: The Next. A year later he got the part of Keigo Atobe in the stage play Prince of Tennis Musical. In 2009, he starred in the stage adaptation of Capcom's video game Sengoku Basara as Date Masamune. After playing the character for four years, he transitioned to a broader career in films and TV.

In 2010, Kubota got his first main role in the movie Gachinko Kenka Joto. On January 31, 2012, he left his agency of two years, Riseki Agency Co., Ltd., for personal reasons. After freelancing for ten months, he joined Japan Music Entertainment at the end of November 2012. In 2013, he was given the role of Takatora Kureshima/Kamen Rider Zangetsu in the tokusatsu series Kamen Rider Gaim (2013–14). Since then, he has appeared in various TV shows and movies, including Shinjuku Swan, and in V-Cinema films. He has played a wide range of characters, from geeks to killers, although he has played mostly antagonist and rival roles. He claimed to prefer playing bad guys and dark heroes.

He is a fan and avid supporter of the local Hiratsuka soccer team Shonan Bellmare and, in April 2015, was appointed to Berusapo Public Relations Office as General Manager of Shonan Living Newspaper that supported the team's activities.

In 2018, he returned to the theater, appearing in the stage plays Gantz: L and Hachioji Zombies, the latter alongside Kenjiro Yamashita from Sandaime J Soul Brothers. In 2019, he reprised his role as Takatora Kureshima/Kamen Rider Zangetsu in the stage play Kamen Rider Zangetsu - Gaim Gaiden.

In addition to acting roles, Kubota has participated in a number of TV variety shows. He was the Monday host of TV Kanagawa's information programme Neko no Hitai Hodo Wide from April 2019 to March 2020. He also directed a promotional video for the stage play Psycho-Pass: Chapter 1 - Crime Coefficient.

On September 30, 2020, he officially launched his YouTube channel "久保田悠来の悠給休暇 (Yuki Kubota's Paid Vacation)" which to date primarily posts Let's Play videos of multiplayer online games.

In May 2021, he had a minor role as a radio staff named Shinomiya on the NHK drama Ochoyan and made a good impression on viewers that the name "Shinomiya-san" became trending on Japanese Twitter.

In January 2022, he made his directorial debut for the 2022 version of Basara stage play.

== Personal life ==
He has an easygoing personality and often cracks jokes during interviews. He loves to make his co-stars laugh, to make their working atmosphere more fun. Kubota stated that he was nothing like the character Takatora Kureshima he portrayed in the series Kamen Rider Gaim.

== Filmography ==
=== TV shows ===
Year	Title	Role	Network	Other notes
2007	Oniyome Nikki	Pick-up artist	Fuji TV	Episode 2
2007	Jotei	Black clothes man	TV Asahi	Episodes 4–5
2008	Gokusen	Club host	Nihon TV	Episode 4
2011	Garo: Makai Senki	Juran	TV Tokyo	Episode 9
2013	TAKE FIVE - Oretachi wa Ai wo Nusumeru ka	Tachibana	TBS	Episodes 5–6
2013	Kamen Rider Gaim	Takatora Kureshima / Kamen Rider Zangetsu / Kamen Rider Shin Zangetsu	TV Asahi	
2014	Ressha Sentai ToQger Vs. Kamen Rider Gaim Spring Vacation Combining Special	Takatora Kureshima / Kamen Rider Shin Zangetsu	TV Asahi	
2015	Keibuho Sugiyama Shintaro (Daddy Detective)	Tatsuya Aragaki	TBS	
2015	Naniwa Kin'yūdō	Kenta Kurozumi	Fuji TV	
2015	Do S Deka	Takashi Kaitou	NTV	Episode 10
2015	Konkatsu Deka	Masashi Shiina	Yomiuri TV	Episode 1
2015	Detective Catherine	Detective Suzuki	TV Asahi	
2016	Detective Catherine: The Disappeared Heir	Detective Suzuki	TV Asahi	
2016	Ya-san - From Tsukiji! Delicious Case Book	Kentaro Nitta	TV Tokyo	Final episode
2017	Kasouken no Onna Season 16	Teruto Koda	TV Asahi	Episode 10
2017	Kirawareru Yūki	Takamasa Kondō	Fuji TV	Episodes 9–10
2017	Sanbiki no Ossan - Seigi no Mikata, Mitabi!	Taiga	TV Tokyo	Episode 8
2017	Uchu Sentai Kyuranger	Scorpio	TV Asahi	Episodes 5, 12–13, 15–21
2017	Thrill! The Black Chapter	Mitsuru Kawada	NHK BS Premium	Episode 4
2017	Tomodachi Game (Friends Games)	Ren Tōjō	TV Kanagawa	
2017	Code Name: Mirage	Thunder / Ryosuke Muto	TV Tokyo	Episodes 7-25
2017	Minshuu no Teki (The Public Enemy)	Takahiro Abe	Fuji TV	Episodes 2, 3, 5, 8, 10
2018	Mob Psycho 100	Kenji Mitsuura	TV Tokyo	
2018	The Count of Monte Cristo: Gorgeous Revenge	Naoki Ushiyama	Fuji TV	Episodes 3–9
2018	Signal	Detective Sasaki	Fuji TV	Episodes 8–9
2019	Meiji Tokyo Renka	Fujita Gorō	TV Kanagawa, U-NEXT	
2019	Two Weeks	Yu Mamiya	Kansai TV (Fuji Network System)	Adaptation of the Korean drama Two Weeks
2019	Sherlock: Untold Stories	Masaki Shibata	Fuji TV	Episode 8
2020	Hachioji Zombies	Jin	MXTV	
2020	Rentaru Nanmo Nai Hito no Nanmo Shinakatta Hanashi	Bartender	TV Tokyo	Episode 12
2020	Ano Ko no Yume wo Mitan desu	Marketing staff	TV Tokyo	Episode 5
2021	Metropolitan Police Department Law Enforcement Officer Akira Higuchi	Michio Araki	TV Tokyo	Final episode
2021	Ochoyan	Kazuo Shinomiya	NHK	Episodes 101, 105–112
2021	Keishichō Sōsaikkachō (Police Department Investigation Division Chief) Season 5	Shunsuke Mizoguchi	TV Asahi	Episode 3
2021	Love Phantom	Yu Fukami	MBS TV	Episodes 3–10
2021	Avalanche	Shingo Nagai	Kansai TV	Episode 2
2021	Odoribanite (At the Landing)	Satoru Miyauchi	Fuji TV	33rd Young Scenario Award Grand Prize
2022	Oi Hansamu!!	Tatsuya	Tōkai TV / Fuji TV	Episodes 1–3, 8
2022	Don't Call It Mystery	Haya Inudou	Fuji TV	Episodes 1–3, 11–12
2022	Fishbowl Wives	Jun	Netflix	
2022	Kasouken no Onna Season 21	Yoshihiko Yamagami	TV Asahi	Special episode
2022	Kaseifu no Mitazono (Mr Housekeeper, Mitazono) Season 5	Yukio Tsuzuki	TV Asahi	Episode 4
2022	Special Investigation Department 9 (Tokusō 9) Season 5	Kazuki Shimada	TV Asahi	Episode 10
2022	PopUP! Afternoon Women's Drama	Kosuke Saeki	Fuji TV	Episode 4
2022	Zennin Nagaya	Higoi no Denhachi	NHK BS Premium (BS4K)	Episode 2
2022	Teppachi!	Takayuki Ōki	Fuji TV	Episodes 7 - 11
2022	Ikemen-domo yo Meshi o Kue	Aoyama	TV Osaka / BSTV Tokyo	Episode 8
2022	Silent	Nezu	Fuji TV	
2023	Nankai Trough Megaquake Drama	Mikami	NHK	NHK Special
2023	Kimichika Kazama - Kyoujo 0	Kentaro Ashizawa	Fuji TV	Episode 1
2023	Ikukyuu Deka	Sho Endo	NHK	Episode 5
2023	Hayabusa Fire Brigade	Yasunori Asano	TV Asahi	Episode 5
2023	Hyena	Yuya Enomoto	TV Tokyo	Adaptation of South Korean drama series Hyena
2024	Happy of the End	Kaji	Fuji TV	

=== Films ===
Year	Title	Role	Other notes
2007	Dear Friends	Club patron	
2007	Kamen Rider: The Next	Tourist	Epilogue
2009	Randies	Masami Kasuga	
2010	Gachinko Kenka Jōtō (High School War - Throwdown!)	Satoshi Saeki	
2010	Local Boys!	Tohru	
2011	Gangsta	Riki Shiraishi	
2011	Kōshōnin Dōmoto Reiji	Reiji Dōmoto	V-Cinema
2011	An Assassin	Shunichi Misaki	
2012	Kirin: Point of No Return	Chosuke	
2012	Shi Gata Futari Wowakatsumade... Chapter 1: Iro no Nai Ao	cameo	
2012	Happiness in Little Place	Renji Ogawa	
2013	Garo: Soukoku no Maryu	Kakashi	
2013	Kyūkyoku!! Hentai Kamen	Reporter	
2013	Hadaka no Itoko	Takeshi	
2013	Kamen Rider × Kamen Rider Gaim & Wizard: The Fateful Sengoku Movie Battle	Takatora Kureshima/Kamen Rider Zangetsu	
2013	Yokohama Story	Yuuya Tanabe	
2014	Heisei Rider vs. Shōwa Rider: Kamen Rider Taisen feat. Super Sentai	Takatora Kureshima/Kamen Rider Zangetsu Shin, Kamen Rider Shin (Voice)	
2014	Boku to 23-nin no Dorei (Tokyo Slaves)	Shinjuku Seiya	
2014	Magic Night	Nasuka	
2014	Kamen Rider Gaim: Great Soccer Battle! Golden Fruits Cup!	Takatora Kureshima/Kamen Rider Shin Zangetsu	
2014	Kamen Rider × Kamen Rider Drive & Gaim: Movie War Full Throttle	Takatora Kureshima/Kamen Rider Zangetsu/Kamen Rider Shin Zangetsu	
2015	Shinjuku Swan	Yosuke	
2015	Gaim Gaiden: Kamen Rider Zangetsu/Kamen Rider Baron	Takatora Kureshima / Kamen Rider Shin Zangetsu	V-Cinema
2015	Kiri: The Chronicles of a Professional Killer	Ryo	
2015	Uchimura Summers The Movie: Angel	Ito	
2015	Mr. Maxman	Takatoshi Kanda	
2015	Wasureyuki	Narumi	Directed by South Korean director Han Sang-Hee, and starring Chansung, member of the Korean boy band 2PM
2015	Gaim Gaiden: Kamen Rider Duke/Kamen Rider Knuckle	Takatora Kureshima / Kamen Rider Zangetsu / Kamen Rider Zangetsu Shin	V-Cinema
2016	Trumpet on the Cliff	Kōichi	Directed by South Korean director Han Sang-Hee, and starring Byung Hun (L. Joe), past member of the Korean boy band Teen Top.
2016	Bros. Maxman	Takatoshi Kanda	
2016	Love is a Dog from Hell		Directed by Edmund Yeo. Screened at 20th Bucheon International Fantastic Film Festival, and at 2017 Yubari International Fantastic Film Festival
2016	SCOOP!	Ryū Ishiwatari	
2016	Derushine: El Shuriken vs Shin Konchū Deathquito	Kōji Higashi	
2017	Shinjuku Swan II	Yosuke	
2017	NY Maxman	Takatoshi Kanda	
2017	Tomodachi Game Gekijoban	Ren Tōjō	
2017	Karada no Uttara Sayonara (Love for Sale)	Rei	
2017	Tomodachi Game Gekijoban: FINAL	Ren Tōjō	
2017	Uchu Sentai Kyuranger: Episode of Stinger	Scorpio	V-Cinema
2018	Misoji Onna wa Romanchikku na Yume wo Miru ka?	Takuto Kazama	
2018	Futatsu no Kinō to Boku no Mirai	Kenzō Kurokawa	
2019	Meiji Tokyo Renka	Fujita Gorō	
2019	Gozen	Masaki Kazuma	
2019	Tokyo Wine Party People	Murasaki Sakuragi's father	Special appearance
2019	Doubt - Usotsuki Otoko wa Dare?	Kazumi Kagami	
2019	BLACKFOX: Age of the Ninja	Shigetsugu Toda	Web-distributed, live action spin-off of the anime Blackfox
2020	Hachioji Zombies	Jin	
2020	Gaim Gaiden: Kamen Rider Gridon vs. Kamen Rider Bravo	Takatora Kureshima / Kamen Rider Zangetsu / Kamen Rider Gridon	Web-release miniseries
2024	Samurai Detective Onihei: Blood for Blood	Koheiji Sawada	
2024	The Quiet Yakuza 2: Part 1	Toshiki Kawaji	
2024	The Quiet Yakuza 2: Part 2	Toshiki Kawaji	

== Theatrical Performances ==
Year(s)	Title	Role	Notes
2007	Switch	Hal Kurabayashi	September 20–23, 2007, at Differ Ariake
2008 - 2010	Prince of Tennis Musical	Keigo Atobe	The Imperial Presence Hyotei feat. Higa (July 29 - September 15, 2008, at Nippon Seinenkan Hall); The Treasure Match Shitenhouji feat. Hyotei (December 13, 2008 - March 31, 2009, at Nippon Seinenkan Hall); Dream Live 6th (May 2–3, 2009, at Tokyo Metropolitan Gymnasium; May 9–10, 2009, at Kobe World Hall); The Final Match Rikkai First feat. Shitenhouji (July 30 - October 4, 2009, at Nippon Seinenkan Hall); The Final Match Rikkai Second feat. The Rivals (December 17, 2009 - March 14, 2010, at Nippon Seinenkan Hall); Dream Live 7th (May 7–9, 2010, at Kobe World Hall; May 20–23, 2010, at Yokohama Arena)
2008 - 2009	THE BUTTERFLY EFFECT	Alan	Premiere (October 31 - November 3, 2008, at Theater Green BOX in BOX THEATER); Replay (April 9–12, 2009, at Minami-osawa Cultural Hall)
2009	Bakumatsu Taiyou-den	Okada Izō	January 29 - February 1, 2009, at Kichijoji Theater
2009 - 2013	Butai Sengoku Basara	Date Masamune	Sengoku Basara (July 3–12, 2009, at Theater G-Rosso); Sengoku Basara - Soukou Kyoutou (April 9–18, 2010, at Sunshine Theater); Sengoku Basara 3 (October 14–16, 2011, at Ion Keshohin Theater BRAVA!; October 23–30, 2011, at Theater G-Rosso); Sengoku Basara 2 (May 11–15, 2012, at Le Theatre Ginza; May 19–20, 2012, at Ion Keshohin Theater BRAVA!; June 2–3, 2012, at Chunichi Theatre); Sengoku Basara 3 - Setouchi Hibiki Arashi (November 2–11, 2012, at Tokyo Dome City Hall; November 16–18, 2012, at Nippon Seinenkan Big Hall; May 23–26, 2012, at Morinomiya Piloti Hall); Butai Sengoku Basara Bushou Matsuri 2013 (July 13–14, 2013, at Ariake Coliseum)
2009	Sora no Kyōkai: Okada Izō Ibun	Okada Izō	August 27–30, 2009, at Theater Green BIG TREE THEATER
2009	Existence: Episode 0	Hikaru	December 5–7, 2009, at Rikkoukai Hall
2010 - 2012	Hanasakeru Seishōnen	Lee-Leng Huang	The Budding Beauty (September 29 - October 6, 2010, at Sogetsu Hall); The Budding Beauty in the Oriental Blue Wind (February 16–27, 2011, at Sogetsu Hall); The Blooming Princess Special Event (November 26–27, 2011, at Harajuku Quest Hall); The Blooming Princess (Raginei Revolution) (January 13–15, 2012, at Sunshine Theater); The Blooming Princess (Love and Fate) (January 17–18, 2012, at Sunshine Theater)
2010	BUTLER x BATTLER - Gekidō no toki o koete, seiya no okurimono	Eisuke Nishikata	December 22–26, 2010, at Theater 1010
2011	AND ENDLESS 15th Anniversary Special Program vol. 1	Okada Izō	March 27 - May 5, 2011, at Zenshinza
2012	A Study in Scarlet (Recitation Drama)	Watson / Holmes	September 30 - October 11, 2012, at Tennozu Ginga Theater
2012	Basara	Ageha	December 12–16, 2012, at Zenrosai Hall / Space Zero
2015	Love Letters	Andy	January 10, 2015, at Zepp Blue Theater Roppongi
2018	GANTZ: L - ACT & ACTION STAGE	Shion Izumi	January 26 - February 4, 2018, at Tennozu Ginga Theater
2018	Hachioji Zombies	Jin	August 5–18, 2018, at TBS Akasaka ACT Theater
2019	Kamen Rider Zangetsu - Gaim Gaiden	Takatora Kureshima / Kamen Rider Zangetsu	March 9–24, 2019, at Nippon Seinenkan Hall; March 28–31, 2019, at Kyoto Theater
2019	Reading Theater 'Dark Alice'		June 1, 2019, at Sunshine Theater
2019	Psycho-Pass: Chapter 1 - Crime Coefficient	Shinya Kogami	October 25 - November 10, 2019, at Shinagawa Prince Hotel Stellar Ball
2021	Engeki no Mori-san - The Entertainment Theater Vol. 0	Narrator (The Prince of the Stars), Rivière (Night Flight)	Reading Theater - The Prince of the Stars (January 12, 2021, at Sunshine Theater); Reading Theater - Night Flight (January 16, 2021, at Sunshine Theater)
2022	Basara	Ageha (W Cast), Director	January 13–23, 2022, at Theater Sun Mall. Yuki Kubota also directed the performance
2022	Bungo Stray Dogs: Storm Bringer	Professor N	June 24–27, at Nippon Seinenkan Hall; July 2–3, at Higashi Osaka Cultural Hall - Dream House Grand Hall
2023	Sei Nise no Geinou Production	Kiraku	March 15, at Yomiuri Otemachi Hall
2023	Utakatano (Reading & Dramatic play)	Drama part	March 31, at Zenrosai Hall (Kokuman Coop Hall/Space Zero)
2023	Theater Group Z-Lion Waratte mo Ii Ie (The House Where You Can Laugh)	Manabu Manabe	July 1–9, 2023 at Tokyo Haiyuza Theater
