= Hound Dog (band) =

Japanese rock band

- Origin: Japan
- Genres: Rock
- Years active: 1976–present

Hound Dog is a Japanese rock band formed in 1976 that is centered around Kohei Otomo. Examples of popular songs include "ff (Fortissimo)" (1985) (Japanese: 「ff（フォルティシモ）」, Hepburn: "ff (Forutishimo)"), "Only Love" (1988) and "BRIDGE~When Crossing the Bridge~" (1992) (Japanese: 「BRIDGE〜あの橋をわたるとき〜」, Hepburn: "BRIDGE~ano hashi o wataru toki~"). During the second half of the 1980s, the band boasted a tremendous effort of touring Japan with a series of live performances. In the late 1990s, they became less active and in 2005 lead vocalist Otomo began to express interest in pursuing a solo career. This ultimately developed into a lawsuit throwing the band into a state of confusion. As of 2018, Otomo is the only official member left in the band.

Internationally, Hound Dog are best known for their 1986 single "R★O★C★K★S", the first opening theme to the Naruto anime.

== History ==
While attending Tohoku Gakuin University in 1976, guitarist and founding member Yoshihide Takahashi (高橋良秀 <reading needs confirmation>) gave the impetus to form the band when he called out to Kohei Otomo by saying "Let's do it together!". Otomo then adopted the name of the band from an Elvis Presley hit song of the same name that he adored very much. In 1980, the band achieved its debut with the single "Storm's Friday" (Japanese: 『嵐の金曜日』, Hepburn: "arashi no kin'youbi"). Despite many ups and downs such as changing members in 1984, Hound Dog had since then managed to continue a lasting activity within the Japanese rock scene.

The said activity is considered to mainly consist of their live performances. Without any hit songs at all, the band managed to gather a crowd of roughly ten thousand people for their first public debut at Nippon Budokan, after which they continued their live tour for a period of around three years. For the sake of local students, who despite buying tickets, were not able to go due to school guidelines, the band organized another live performance at the same place once again in an effort to communicate their message of "music being heck of a wonderful thing". Students were allowed to use their graduation certificates as tickets (which essentially meant that it was free of charge). Also, the live concert's closing time was set to an earlier hour for the sake of safety, and it was decided to have it take place somewhere not dangerous for the students. This entire arrangement left the band with an unprecedented achievement on their track record. In 1989, Hound Dog performed a 15-day live concert marathon, which came to be the longest string of performances in the history of Nippon Budokan. This record has not been broken as of 2017.

Beginning with 1981, the Rock'n'Roll Olympics were held annually near the outskirts of Sendai City, turning into the forerunner of Japanese outdoor rock festivals. Furthermore, fund-raising and charity live activities such as the Hiroshima "Peace Concert" and the "Dream Island Live Concert" were performed by Hound Dog over the years as a form of social participation events.

== Selected discography ==
- Welcome to the Rock 'n Roll Show 1981
- Stand Play 1981
- Power Up! 1981
- Roll Over 1982
- Brash Boy 1983
- Dreamer 1984
- Spirits! 1985
- Love 1986
- Be Quiet 1987
- Gold 1989
- Voice 1990
- Back to Rock 1991
- Bridge 1992
- River 1993
- Rock Me 1994
- Across the Rainbow 1996
- Baby Universe 1998
- Happy Star 2000
- Big Dipper 2002
- 11 Rooms for Sky 2004
- Omega 2005
