= Minami Tsukui =

Japanese actress (born 1987)

- 佃井 皆美
- Born: December 18, 1987 (age 38); Saitama Prefecture, Japan
- Occupation: Actress
- Years active: 2007–present
- Height: 162 cm (5 ft 4 in)

Minami Tsukui (佃井 皆美, Tsukui Minami; born December 18, 1987, in Saitama Prefecture, Japan) is a Japanese actress who is formerly affiliated with Japan Action Enterprise. She is best known for her role as the character Yoko Minato/Kamen Rider Marika, from the Kamen Rider series Kamen Rider Gaim.

== Biography ==
Tsukui graduated from Japan Action Enterprise's 37th class. Her skills are jazz dancing, hip-hop, and sewing. Tsukui's hobbies are theater appreciation and aroma. Her favorite food is natto rice, fried chicken, hamburger, cheese, peach, and chocolate. While she was played as a villain, Tsukui wanted to be a heroine. After leaving Juken Sentai Gekiranger, she thinks that she is not suitable for the role of Lingshi, but a subsequent suit actor was not in charge, Kamen Rider Gaim producer Naomi Takebe requested that she was both responsible for the suit actor after transformation and before the transformation. While synchronized by JAE's Satoshi Fujita, Tsukui served as Hopper Dopant in Kamen Rider W served with Fujita, and in Kamen Rider Gaim her after transformation of her role is played by her as well, such as the role as Kamen Rider Marika she had. She and Fujita were physiques such as the size of the belt is the same but not almost the same, he said that it is better for her is a small thigh but also thin face. As of 2021, she is currently a freelancer.

== Filmography ==
=== TV series ===
Year	Title	Role	Network	Notes
2007	Juken Sentai Gekiranger	Lingshi	TV Asahi	
2007	Kamen Rider Den-O		TV Asahi	
2009	Kagerō no Tsuji Inemuri Iwane Edo Zōshi	Saiga Shu Kiriko	NHK	
2010	Kamen Rider W	Grasshopper Woman/Hopper Dopant	TV Asahi	Episodes 37, 38
2014	Kamen Rider Gaim	Yoko Minato/Kamen Rider Marika	TV Asahi	
2015	Ultraman X	Gina Spectre, Guar Spectre (voice)	TV Tokyo	Episodes 12-14
2017	No. 4 Security	Female assassin	NHK	Episode 7

=== Films ===
Year	Title	Role	Notes
2008	Geisha Assassin	Kotono Yamabe	Lead role
2008	Triangle Connection	Eruna	
2008	Saraba Kamen Rider Den-O: Final Countdown	Daughter	
2009	Pride	College student	
2010	Gothic & Lolita Psycho	Saki	
2013	Zyuden Sentai Kyoryuger: Gaburincho of Music	Earthy	
2013	Kamen Rider × Kamen Rider Gaim & Wizard: The Fateful Sengoku Movie Battle	Yoko Minato	Cameo
2014	Kamen Rider Gaim: Great Soccer Battle! Golden Fruits Cup!	Yoko Minato/Kamen Rider Marika	
2015	Gaim Gaiden: Kamen Rider Zangetsu/Kamen Rider Baron	Yoko Minato/Kamen Rider Marika	V-Cinema
2015	Gaim Gaiden: Kamen Rider Duke	Yoko Minato/Kamen Rider Marika	V-Cinema
2017	Kamen Sentai Gorider	Yoko Minato/Kamen Rider Marika	Web-only Mini-series
2017	Space Squad	Maki	V-Cinema
2025	Kamen Rider Majade with Girls Remix	Yoko Minato/Kamen Rider Marika	Web-only Mini-series

=== Live stages ===
Year	Title	Role	Notes
2011	wipeout	Minami	Lead role
2012	VisuaLive: Persona 4	Chie Satonaka	
2012	VisuaLive: Persona 4 - The Evolution	Chie Satonaka	
2012	Tiger & Bunny The Live	Pao-Lin Huang/Dragon Kid	
2013	Living ADV: Steins;Gate	Suzuha Amane	
2014	Mirage of Blaze: Shōwa-hen - Yonakidori Blues	Marie Kosugi/Haruie Kakizaki	
2015	Hobo's Song	Kana	
2015	Mirage of Blaze: Shōwa-hen - Ruritsubame Blues	Marie Kosugi/Haruie Kakizaki	
2016	Live Fantasy Fairy Tail	Erza Scarlet	
2016	The Angels With Closed Eyes	Kay	
2016	Mirage of Blaze: Shōwa-hen - Yashashū Boogie Woogie	Marie Kosugi/Haruie Kakizaki	
2017	A Record of the Delfinian War: Chapter 1	Lee	
2017	Doraemon: Nobita and the Animal Planet	Chippo	
2017	Live Impact Attack on Titan	Mikasa Ackerman	Show cancelled
2017	From Three Sons of Mama Fratelli	Chacha	
2018	Shōjo Kageki Revue Starlight: The Live	Suzu Minase from Seiran General Art Institute	
2022	Sword Art Online -DIVE TO STAGE-	Asuna	Lead role
2025	Musical Fate/Zero: The Sword of Promised Victory	Maiya Hisau	
