= Tsunenori Aoki =

Japanese actor and model

- 青木 玄徳
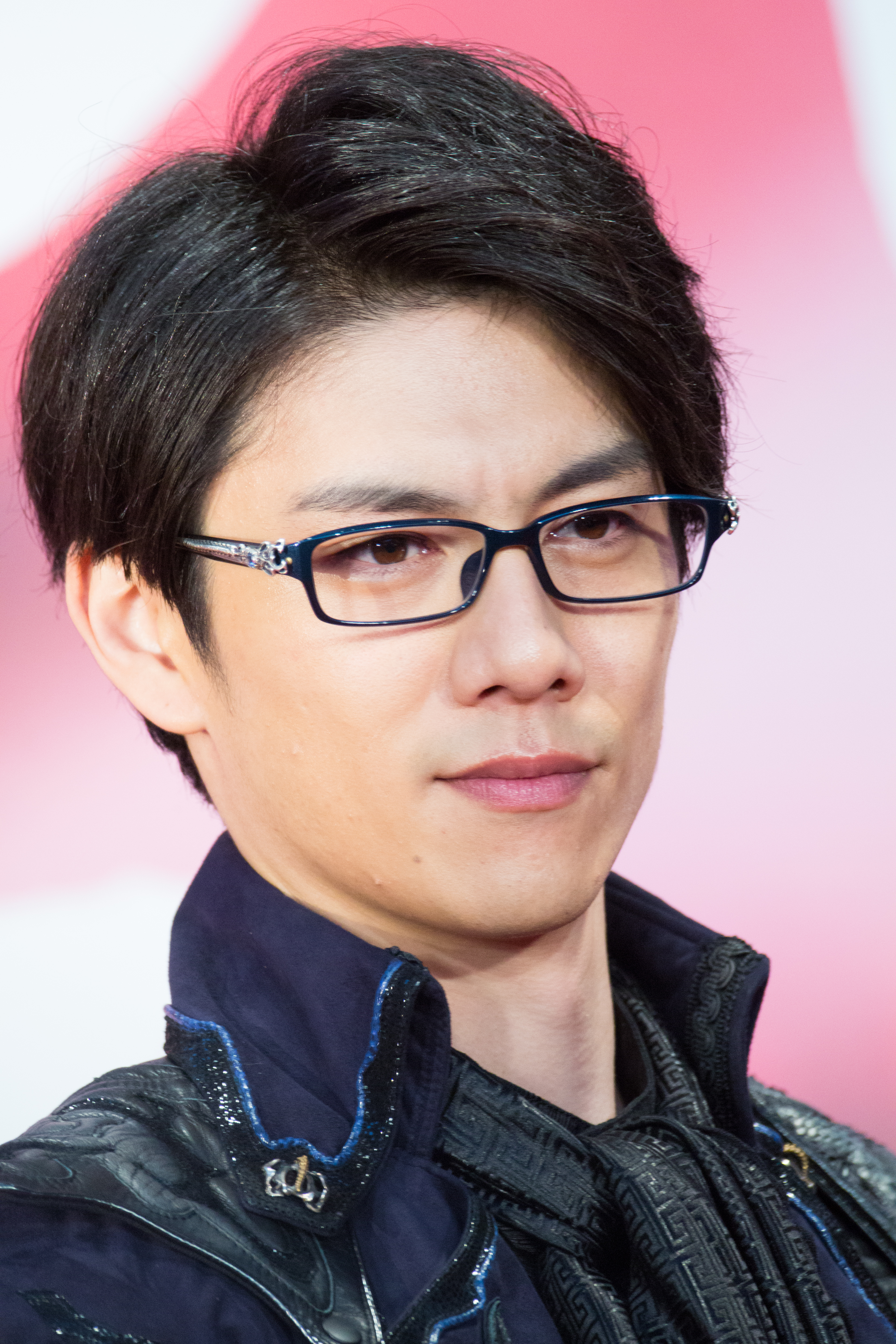
- Tsunenori Aoki at Opening Ceremony of the Tokyo International Film Festival 2017.
- Born: October 19, 1987 (age 38); Saitama Prefecture, Japan
- Occupations: Actor, Model
- Years active: 2011-present
- Height: 180 cm (5 ft 11 in)
- Website: Official website

Tsunenori Aoki (青木 玄徳, Aoki Tsunenori; born October 19, 1987) is a Japanese actor and model.

== Life and career ==
Aoki was born in Saitama Prefecture, Japan on October 19, 1987. After the death of his father in 2007, Aoki took up numerous part-time jobs to support his mother and sister. While working as a champagne server at a car show, he was recruited by the president of Dolce Star management.

Aoki initially started out as a model but developed an interest in becoming an actor. He made his acting debut as Keigo Atobe in the 2nd season of the stage adaptation of the popular anime series The Prince Of Tennis.

Aoki quit Dolce Star management on March 31, 2018.

Aoki was arrested on forced indecent assault on April 5, 2018. On April 27, charges were dropped.

== Filmography ==
=== Television ===
Year	Title	Role	Network	Notes	Ref.
2013	Garo: Yami o Terasu Mono	Aguri Kusugami / Gai the Sky Bow Knight	TV Tokyo		
2013	Hōkago Groove	College Student	TBS	Episode 8	
2013	Keiji no Manazashi	Koji Sawada	TBS	Episode 8	
2013	Kamen Rider Gaim	Ryoma Sengoku / Kamen Rider Duke	TV Asahi	Episodes 7 to 43	
2017	Nekonin	Sanosuke			

=== Films ===
Year	Title	Role	Notes
2013	Kamen Rider × Kamen Rider Gaim & Wizard: The Fateful Sengoku Movie Battle	Ryoma Sengoku	
2014	Kamen Rider Gaim: Great Soccer Battle! Golden Fruits Cup!	Ryoma Sengoku / Kamen Rider Duke	
2014	Kamen Rider × Kamen Rider Drive & Gaim: Movie War Full Throttle	Mecha Ryoma Sengoku / Kamen Rider Duke	
2015	Yamikin Dogs	Tsukasa Sudo	
2015	Mr. Max Man	Shin Fukuhara	
2015	Gaim Gaiden: Kamen Rider Zangetsu/Kamen Rider Baron	Ryoma Sengoku / Kamen Rider Duke	
2015	Gaim Gaiden: Kamen Rider Duke	Ryoma Sengoku / Kamen Rider Duke	
2016	Yamikin Dogs 2	Tsukasa Sudo	
2016	Yamikin Dogs 3	Tsukasa Sudo	
2016	Corpse Party: Book of Shadows	Yuuya Kizami	
2016	Intern!	Naoki Tachibana	
2016	Yamikin Dogs 4	Tsukasa Sudo	
2017	Bros. Max Man	Shin Fukuhara	
2017	Yamikin Dogs 5	Tsukasa Sudo	
2017	Tantei wa, Konya mo Yuuutsuna Yume wo Miru	Shoji Aoi	
2017	Kurawanka!		
2017	Tsuioku Dance		
2017	Yamikin Dogs 6	Tsukasa Sudo	
2017	Yamikin Dogs 7	Tsukasa Sudo	
2018	Garo: Kami no Kiba	Aguri Kusugami / Gai the Sky Bow Knight	
2018	Yamikin Dogs 8	Tsukasa Sudo	
2018	Yamikin Dogs 9	Tsukasa Sudo	
2018	Drop of Love		
2019	Patalliro!	Jack Barbarosa Bancoran	

=== Stage ===
Year	Title	Role	Notes
2011-2014	The Prince of Tennis	Keigo Atobe	
2012	Funny Bunny -Bird and Sad Sky-		
2012	Junkers Come Here	Junkers	
2012	Rhythmic Town	Rao	
2013	Tropical Boys	Ginzo	
2013	Absolute Boyfriend	Night	
2014	Ocean Light		
2014	Sonogo no Futari	Junya	
2014	Gang Hour		
2015	Mononofu Shiroki Tora	Hajime Saitoh	
2015	Princess Knight	Captain Blood	
2016	Tsumuru Ookami Kuroki Kamo	Hajime Saitoh	
2016	Love Letters ~2016 The Climax Special~		
2016	Patalliro!	Major Jack Barbarossa Bancoran	
2017	Satomi Hakkenden	Dosetsu Inuyama	
2018	Kake Hayabusa Hito Yamato	Hajime Saitoh	
2018	Patalliro!: Stardust Plan	Major Jack Barbarossa Bancoran	
