= Yutaka Kobayashi (actor) =

Japanese actor

- Born: March 19, 1989 (age 36); Shiga Prefecture, Japan
- Occupations: Actor, dance
- Years active: 2009–present
- Height: 174 cm (5 ft 9 in)
- Website: http://ameblo.jp/yutaka-kobayashi/

Yutaka Kobayashi (小林 豊, Kobayashi Yutaka; born March 19, 1989) is a Japanese actor and singer formally affiliated with Fortune Entertainment. He was the oldest member of the boy group Boys and Men, designated by his color yellow-green. He is best known for his role as the character, Kaito Kumon/Kamen Rider Baron, from the Kamen Rider series Kamen Rider Gaim.

== Early life ==
Kobayashi was born in Shiga Prefecture, Japan. While getting the confectionery health nurse license in confectionery of vocational school after graduating from high school, he worked as a pastry chef in Shiga and Tokyo. With the aim of the entertainment industry into an opportunity that it has submitted the recommendation of a friend in Junon Super Boy Contest, he started entertainment activities from November 2009 to belong to the Thani promotion. While after the debut, Kobayashi had parallel work and entertainment activities of making cake.

== Career ==
In June 2010, he participated in the predecessor project Ikemen☆Nagoya of Boys and Men. Kobayashi was not a from Tōkai, but the residents were along the concept of the project, he was participated in the audition by the intention of the agency, he became an established member of Boys and Men.

In 2011, his introduction performed was the role of Mizuki in The Prince of Tennis Musical 2nd Season. For practice and performances appearance of the same work, Kobayashi was temporary suspended the activities of Boys and Men. He returned to the unit activity, he had also appeared in the stage outside.

In February 2012, Kobayashi's CD debut as a member of the internal unit YanKee5 of Boys and Men. In November of the same year, his first solo debut was the single "Boku no sekai ga kawatte iku / seven colors ☆ love".

In 2013, Kobayashi's first regular appearances in a television drama was Kamen Rider Gaim. He served as the rival Kaito Kumon / Rider Baron.

In the end of July 2014, Kobayashi made recipes at the community site Cookpad, and start posting of cuisine under the heading of Yutaka Kobayashi's kitchen. In November of the same year, his recipe is the subject of announcing the single "Love Suites recipe" series where Setona Mizushiro worked on lyrics.

In 2014, Kobayashi won at second place in the popular vote of Boys and Men. In the same year, his first starring role in a television drama was Naze Todo-in Seiya 16-sai wa kanojo ga dekinai no ka?

In October 2021, Kobayashi was caught shoplifting ¥9,000 of cosmetics. Due to this, on April 8, 2022, Fortune Entertainment announced his departure from the company and idol group BOYS AND MEN.

== Filmography ==
=== TV series ===
Year	Title	Role	Network	Other notes
2011	Dream High	Ken	KBS2	Episode 10
2013	Asu no Hikari o Tsukame		Tokai TV	
2013	Kamen Rider Gaim	Kaito Kumon/Kamen Rider Baron/Lord Baron	TV Asahi	
2014	Naze Todoin Seiya 16sai wa kanojo dekinainoka	Seiya Todoin		
2018	Kamen Rider Zi-O	Kaito Kumon/Kamen Rider Baron/Lord Baron	TV Asahi	Episodes 11-12

=== Films ===
Year	Title	Role	Other notes
2010	Takumi-kun Series 4: Pure	Michio Yoshizawa	
2013	Kamen Rider × Kamen Rider Gaim & Wizard: The Fateful Sengoku Movie Battle	Kaito Kumon/Kamen Rider Baron	
2014	Heisei Rider vs. Shōwa Rider: Kamen Rider Taisen feat. Super Sentai	Kaito Kumon/Kamen Rider Baron	
2014	Kamen Rider Gaim: Great Soccer Battle! Golden Fruits Cup!	Kaito Kumon/Kamen Rider Baron	
2014	Kamen Rider × Kamen Rider Drive & Gaim: Movie War Full Throttle	Kaito Kumon/Kamen Rider Baron	
2015	Gaim Gaiden: Kamen Rider Baron	Kaito Kumon/Kamen Rider Baron, Shapool	Dual role V-Cinema
2015	Samurai Rock	Nobunaga Oda	
2016	Fukushu Shitai	Tetsuya Tadokoro	
2016	Macchi Shoujo	Isami Naito	
2016	The Book Peddler	Kenichi Okazaki	
2016	Shiratori Reiko de Gozaimasu! The Movie	Kiichi Kiryu	
2017	Kamen Sentai Gorider	Kaito Kumon/Kamen Rider Baron	Web-only Mini-series
2019	Meiji Tokyo Renka	Chari	
2020	Blue Heaven wo Kimi ni		
