= Boys and Men =

Japanese idol group

- Also known as: BOYMEN; BM
- Origin: Nagoya, Japan
- Genre: J-pop
- Years active: 2010–present
- Labels: Fortune Records; Virgin Music
- Members: Masaru Mizuno; Shunsuke Tanaka; Yukihisa Tamura; Tatsunori Tsujimoto; Yutaka Kobayashi; Takafumi Honda; Yuuhi Sano; Kento Hiramatsu; Takumi Tsuchida; Masato Yoshihara
- Past members: Eiji Akaso; Soutarou Okitsu; Ryouta Kobayashi; Taiki Wakana
- Website: boysandmen.jp

Boys and Men (ボーイズ・アンド・メン, Bōizu ando men; stylized in all caps) is a Japanese idol group established in 2010 in Nagoya. The group is composed mainly of members from the Tōkai region. They belong to Fortune Entertainment. The group started up by performing musicals with singing, acting, and dancing. They then started to show up on TV shows, on the radio, and at different kinds of music festivals. The group's base activity location is Nagoya. It was originally an organization with several dozen members, and has been a five-member group since April 2024. It has two spin-off units, YanKee5 and Makoto.

Their single "BOYMEN Ninja" was number one on the Oricon Weekly Singles Chart and also number one on the Billboard Japan Hot 100. Their single "Wanna be!" was also number-one on both charts.

== Features ==
They claim that the group's distinctive features are its "down-to-earth," "hot," and "sweaty" image. The group has been increasingly featured as an "idol group," which has led to an increase in their popularity, but the members themselves have said that "BOYS AND MEN are not idols," and refer to themselves as an "entertainment group." At regular live events that began in June 2011, in addition to singing and dancing, they also held shows such as inline skating and illusions. Until around 2013, they referred to themselves as "an entertainment group that not only sings, dances, and plays, but also performs inline skating and illusions. In 2016, member Masato Yoshihara questioned this phrase, saying, "What is an entertainment group?" and proposed a new catchphrase, "(Nagoya) Town Revitalization Brothers." The phrase gained the approval of other members and was later actively used by the group and producer Seiji Taniguchi. Taniguchi explained that their policy was, "If you're a star, you can dream of being out of reach, but these guys are just your brothers or friends in the neighborhood." Masaru Mizuno, who has been the leader of the group since the second year of its formation, said on a radio program in 2019, "When asked if we're idols, I don't think we're idols," and reminisced that he didn't know what genre they were.

=== Evaluation ===
The group did not receive any critical acclaim as an acting unit in its early days. Even Masato Yoshihara and Yuki Tamura, who had seen the group's performances before joining, felt that the acting and performances were unbearably bad.

Although they do not call themselves "idols," BOYS AND MEN are often described as pioneers and pioneers of "regional male idols". Oricon has stated that they are "a successful example of a male group that is separate from Johnny's, EXILE TRIBE, and K-POP," along with Da-iCE and EBiDAN's Bullet Train and DISH//, who made rapid progress on the charts at the same time. Real Sound has described them as "a boy group that combines musicality and talent" along with SOLIDEMO, who also works in variety shows and acting, and MAG!C☆PRINCE, also based in the Tokai region.

=== Costumes ===
Their trademark is the "Yankee-style school uniform." This style was not used when the group was formed, but was derived from the role and stage costumes they wore in their second musical, "White Tights," which was performed in their second year after the group was formed. Seiji Taniguchi stated that "the school uniform fashion incorporates elements of 'Be-Bop High School.'" During the "White Tights" performance, only the spin-off group YanKee5 wore this style, and at the time, they wore simple school uniforms. When the first album was released, all members (13 at the time), other than YanKee5, started wearing school uniforms, and they replaced them with new ones with flashy embroidery. They have since replaced them several times. These are called "Japanese school uniforms" because the embroidery is Japanese-style. Since their 4th single (2013), they have used new costumes to match the image of each song on their CD jacket photos, and have rarely appeared in school uniforms. However, after signing with Universal Music, they have used new costumes based on school uniforms for each new album release.

After the group was formed into 13 members, each member was assigned a "theme color." The five members of YanKee5 chose the color scheme from their "White Tights" costumes.

== Members ==
Name	Birth date	Age	Birthplace	Date joined	Member colour	Unit	Notes
Yankee 5
Masaru Mizuno (水野勝)	November 22, 1990	35	Aichi	October 2010	Gold	Blue Crayon	Boys and Men and Yankee 5 leader
Shunsuke Tanaka (田中俊介)	January 28, 1990	36	Aichi	June 2010	Silver	No Idea	
Yukihisa Tamura (田村侑久)	October 17, 1990	35	Aichi	April 2011	Aqua	No Idea	
Tatsunori Tsujimoto (辻本達規)	May 17, 1991	35	Gifu	September 2010	Red	Blue Crayon	Temporarily suspended activities in 2011
Makoto (誠)
Takafumi Honda (本田剛文)	November 3, 1992	33	Aichi	March 2011	Pink	The Seventh School Chorus Club	Makoto leader
Yuuhi Sano (勇翔)	February 5, 1993	33	Nagano	October 2010	White / Navy (Note: In Makoto, his member colour was blue but his gakuran colour was white. Later, blue became navy blue.)	The Seventh School Chorus Club	
Kento Hiramatsu (平松賢人)	November 14, 1994	31	Aichi	June 2010	Yellow	The Seventh School Chorus Club	
Masato Yoshihara (吉原雅斗)	July 22, 1994	32	Aichi	March 2011	Dark Green	The Seventh School Chorus Club	

=== Former members ===
Name	Birth date	Age	Birthplace	Date joined	Member colour	Unit	Notes
Soutarou Okitsu (沖津壮太郎)	December 13		Ishikawa	June 2010			Left the group on January 23, 2012
Ryouta Kobayashi (小林亮太)	December 16, 1998	27	Aichi	April 2011		Team S	Left the group on April 29, 2013
Taiki Wakana (若菜太喜)	December 5, 1992	33	Aichi	November 2011	Orange	Makoto	Left the group on March 31, 2016
Takumi Tsuchida (土田拓海)	June 16, 1991	35	Aichi	June 2010	Light Purple	The Seventh School Drama Club	Left the group on August 14, 2021
Yutaka Kobayashi (小林豊)	March 19, 1989	37	Shiga	June 2010	Chartreuse		Left the group on April 8, 2022

== Derived Units ==
=== YanKee5 ===
- Members: Yuku Tamura and Tatsunori Tsujimoto
- Former members: Shunsuke Tanaka, Yutaka Kobayashi, Masaru Mizuno (former leader)

YanKee5 (Yankee Five, abbreviated as Yanfai) is a spin-off unit formed by the five main cast members of the second performance "White☆Tights," and embodies BOYS AND MEN's "Yankee style" before the entire group. They have been active as a "Yankee five-member group" since the performance began in August 2011, but the official date of their formation has not been disclosed.

As part of the promotion for "White Tights," a plan was hatched to have the "Yankee Five" make their CD debut, and the single "Baribari Yankee Road" became BOYS AND MEN's CD debut. Until their CD debut, the unit was also called the "Yankee Five," but with the formation of Makoto, it was decided to give the unit an official name, and a staff member from the agency suggested, "Why not just call them 'Yankee 5'?" This was adopted. The English spelling "YanKee5" was first used on the second single, "Kawaranai Story/READY×READY!".

=== Makoto ===
- Members: Honda Takefumi (leader), Hiramatsu Kento, Yoshihara Masato
- Former members: Taiki Wakana, Takumi Tsuchida, Yuto

Makoto is a spin-off unit that is considered the "younger brother of YanKee5". It was formed on February 16, 2012. Makoto was established as a unit before YanKee5. It is "a unit of refreshing, tough, good-natured young men", and they do not wear gakuran uniforms when performing as Makoto.

In January 2012, Honda formed an informal unit called "Team FRESH" (Yoshihara, who would later join, was also a member of this unit. On February 16, Honda, Yuto, Hiramatsu, Tsuchida, and Wakana became members of the official spin-off unit "Makoto". On July 28, they made their CD debut with the song "READY×READY!" from the double A-side single "Kawaranai Story/READY×READY!" On April 26, 2013, Yoshihara joined the group, making it a sextet. Taniguchi revealed that the reason he chose Honda as the leader was because he appreciated her ability as a leader, such as her "quick thinking," and that the reason he added Yoshihara was "Makoto has good teamwork and is a good team. However, they lacked flair. We aimed to bring in Yoshihara, who has a different style, to bring in some variety. "

From 2012 to 2015, they served as promotional characters for Nagoya TV Tower. They also work as MCs on the information program "Machi Bar". At the end of March 2016, Wakana left BOYS AND MEN, and Makoto became a 5-person group. Around the same time, Honda, Hiramatsu, and Yoshihara also became members of the 7th Academy Choir, which will be described later. In 2019, the unit released a single and went on a concert tour as a standalone group.

=== Team S ===
- Members: Kento Kawamura, Ryota Kobayashi, Yuya Kondo, Yuto Saeki, Tenki Shimizu, Fabio, Tomomasa Yoshikawa, Masato Yoshihara

Team S was originally a one-day unit at an event held in May 2012, but members who were not affiliated with YanKee5 or Makoto at the time joined, and the unit began performing at live events. The "S" in Team S is said to stand for Saeki, who was the central figure in the event. Team S is originally an unofficial unit.

Saeki and Yoshikawa, who were members when the group was made up of 13 members, were often excluded from media appearances and projects that featured all members from that time, and they no longer appeared on CD jacket photos. Around the fall of 2014, when the theater company was launched and NDP STUDIO was closed, Team S's activities decreased, and it almost disappeared naturally. The unit does not have any original songs. The members' future is as follows.

- Saeki and Yoshikawa - Transferred to the Boymen Theater Company in the fall of 2014 (Saeki graduated in December 2016).
- Yoshiwara - Joined Makoto in April 2013.
- Kawamura, Kobayashi, Kondo, and Fabio - Left BOYS AND MEN between 2012 and 2013.
- Shimizu - Went on hiatus in April 2013 and joined BOYS AND MEN as a trainee in December 2015.

=== NO IDEA ===
- Member: Yuku Tamura
- Former member: Shunsuke Tanaka

NO IDEA (abbreviated as NO AI) is a unit formed by Tamura and Tanaka, who won first and second place in a popularity poll at the "White Tights II Nagoya Main Performance" held in February 2013.

After deciding to form the group, they performed under the temporary name "Shuntam" for a while, and on May 28th, they announced their official name, with the meaning of "no idea = no idea at all, no clue", and "with high hopes for the future possibilities of these two unknowns". They released the original song "Stand Up" on their first album "Yankee★Road". In October, they starred in the play "Kagi" alongside actors from Studio Life.

After NDP STUDIO was closed in 2014, NO IDEA only performed "Stand Up" once or twice a year at live shows and events, and gradually stopped performing. Following Tanaka's departure from BOYS AND MEN in November 2019, Tamura wrote on his blog, "Tamura has always been No Idea," referring to NO IDEA.

=== The Seventh School Choir ===
- Members: Honda Takefumi, Hiramatsu Kento, Yoshihara Masato

The Seventh School Choir is a three-member vocal unit consisting of Honda, Hiramatsu, and Yoshihara, which was derived from the CBC Radio program " BOYS AND MEN Sakae Seventh School Otokogumi." In this unit, Honda's name is "Takafumi," Hiramatsu's name is "Kento," and Yoshihara's name is "Masato," and their stage names are the romanized versions of their names.

The group announced its formation on the March 7, 2016 broadcast of BOYS AND MEN Sakae Dai-Nana Gakuen Otokogumi, and stated that it was "a separate project from BOYS AND MEN". On May 19, 2016, the group made their CD debut on CBC Radio's label AR Records with the mini-album Chicken, all of whose lyrics were written by the members themselves.

Although not an official member, Yuto participated as a guest under the name "Bluebeard Baron (Hige Ao Danshaku)". Inspired by the formation of this unit, Takumi Tsuchida formed a comedy duo called "Dai Nanana Gakuen Engeibu" with Nagoya comedian Naoto Sakai.

=== Other units ===
Many other "unofficial" units were formed when the focus was on stage performances and live events. These include the comedy duo Blue Crayon (Tatsuki Tsujimoto, and Masaru Mizuno), Team U (Shunsuke Tanaka, Tatsuki Tsujimoto and Masaru Mizuno) who appeared on Ustream, and White Darvish (Tsuyoshi Honda and Masato Yoshihara). These units, like NO IDEA and Team S, have been largely inactive since NDP STUDIO was closed.

== Discography ==
=== Singles ===
1. Bari Bari ☆ Yankee Road (バリバリ☆ヤンキーロード)（2012年2月14日） (Note: 表題曲はYanKee5の楽曲。カップリング「Endless Sky」は水野勝と浜尾京介の楽曲。)
2. Kawaranai Story / READYxREADY! (変わらないStory/READY×READY!)（2012年7月27日） (Note: 「Kawaranai Story」is YanKee5's、「READY×READY!」is Makoto's songs.)
3. Granspear no theme (グランスピアーのテーマ)（2013年12月18日）
4. Shiawase no Tane / My Only Christmas Wish (幸せの種/My Only Christmas Wish)（2013年12月23日） (Note: 「Shiawase no Tane」is YanKee5's、「My Only Christmas Wish」is Makoto's songs.。)
5. RETURNER（2014年1月11日）
6. Chocolate Prince (チョコレートプリンス)（2014年2月1日）
7. Shautteiina / Lovely Monster (シャウッティーナ/Lovely Monster)（2014年5月10日） (Note: 「Shautteiina」is YanKee5's、「Lovely Monster」is Makoto's songs.)
8. Tokonatsu Alright!!! (常夏オーライ!!!)（2014年7月25日）
9. Good Job! Muchuuman / Mikansei Puzzle. (グッジョブ! ムチューマン/未完成パズル。)（2014年11月12日）
10. BOIMEN Taisou (ボイメン体操)（2015年3月1日）
11. Rei / Fanfare (零/Fanfare)（2015年4月4日）
12. ARC of Smile!（2015年5月27日、マーベラス）
13. stand hard! 〜Orera no Akogare Ryuu Senshi〜 (stand hard! 〜オレらの憧れ竜戦士〜)（2015年7月4日）
14. Onegaiyo! Oh Summer (お願いよ!Oh Summer!)（2015年7月31日）
15. BOYMEN NINJA（2016年1月6日） (Note: 販売元はユニバーサルミュージック。)
16. Wanna be!（2016年2月3日、キングレコード）
17. YAMATO☆Dancing（2016年8月24日、Virgin Music）
18. DoraMAX!!! 〜Orera no Akogare Ryuu Senshi〜ドラMAX!!! 〜オレらの憧れ竜戦士〜（2017年4月15日） (Note: 13thシングル「stand hard! 〜オレらの憧れ竜戦士〜」のリニューアル版。)
19. Howoagero (帆を上げろ!)（2017年8月2日、Virgin Music）
20. UFO（2017年11月3日、Virgin Music）
21. Shinkarion (進化理論)（2018年5月9日）
22. En・Tenka Dasshu (炎・天下奪取) (2018年9月12日発売予定)
23. Film in my head (頭の中のフィルム) (5/29/2019)
24. Fortissimo #ff (Mokoto) (フォルティシモ#ff) (6/13/2019)
25. Gattan Gotton GO! (ガッタンゴットンGO！) (12/25/2019)
26. Oh Yeah! (9/09/2020)
27. New Challenger (7/28/2021)

=== Albums ===
- Yankee ★ Road (ヤンキー★ロード)（2013年5月4日）
- YANKEE ROAD the BEST（2014年12月23日） (Note: ベスト・アルバムとも扱われる。)
- Chicken (チキン)（Dai Nana Gakuen Choir (第七学園合唱部)、2016年5月19日、AR Records）
- Cheer up!（2016年6月1日、キングレコード）
- Ifudoudou〜B.M.C.A.〜 (威風堂々〜B.M.C.A.〜)（2016年12月14日、Virgin Music）
- TOKIO 47（配信アルバム、2017年3月28日、Virgin Music）
- Tomoarite (友ありて・・)（2017年12月20日、Virgin Music）
- BOYMEN the Universe (2021-01-27)
