= Garo: Kami no Kiba =

- Theatrical Release Poster

Japanese name
- Kanji: 牙狼〈GARO〉-神ノ牙-
- Directed by: Keita Amemiya
- Written by: Keita Amemiya
- Starring: Wataru Kuriyama; Junya Ikeda; Tsunenori Aoki; Masahiro Inoue
- Music by: Shiho Terada; Yoshichika Kuriyama
- Production companies: Tohokushinsha Film; Omnibus Japan
- Distributed by: Tohokushinsha Film
- Release dates: October 31, 2017 (30th Tokyo International Film Festival); January 6, 2018 (Japan)
- Running time: 96 minutes
- Country: Japan
- Language: Japanese

Garo: Kami no Kiba (牙狼〈GARO〉-神ノ牙-, Garo Kami no Kiba; lit. "Garo: Fang of God") is a 2017 dark fantasy superhero tokusatsu theatrical film produced by Tohokushinsha Film and Omnibus Japan. Featuring the main characters from Garo: Gold Storm Sho and Garo: Yami o Terasu Mono and overall the eighth feature film in the Garo franchise. It stars Wataru Kuriyama, Junya Ikeda, Tsunenori Aoki and Masahiro Inoue, with Keita Amemiya directing and writing the film's script. It was first screened on October 31, 2017 at the 30th Tokyo International Film Festival and was released in Japanese theaters on January 6, 2018.

== Plot ==
The film begins with a researcher revealing to a woman that he found the location of the Fang of God, an ancient Horror vessel that can take Horrors to the moon to empower them. However, after learning its location, the woman reveals herself as the Horror Rinza, whose subordinate Boel kills the man. Elsewhere, Aguri is approached by Banbi, a Makai Priest who is a childhood friend of his. With Aguri's help, Banbi steals the armors of Takeru and Ryuga, who confront Aguri just to learn that she needs the armors of the three to perform an ancient ritual to revive her lover Judo, a Makai Knight who fell into darkness, for one night. However, once performing the ritual, Banbi discovers that she was tricked by Rinza, who tempers with the ritual so that she ends up reviving Jinga instead of Judo.

After killing Banbi, Jinga, Rinza and Boel gather a horde of Horrors at an office building, where Jinga kills Boel and uses his body to activate the Fang of God. With help from their allies, the three Makai Knights accompanied by Rian storm the building, disposing of all the Horrors, and apparently killing Rinza as well. However, just as they are about to confront Jinga, who returns their armors in order to have a fair fight with them, the Fang of God launches into orbit with them inside. As the Fang ascends, Ryuga and Jinga have a fierce fight until they are trapped by Rinza, who is revealed to be alive. She then tells them that her true objective is to revive Messiah using the Fang of God and reveals that Judo's soul was too weak for it, thus she conspired for Jinga to be revived instead. Jinga then breaks free, and destroys her after revealing that he saw through her plan all along, as his true intention was to have another chance to fight Ryuga. Once reunited with his companions, Ryuga defeats Jinga once more and the four return safely to Earth, paying their respects to Ryume before Ryuga and Rian part ways with their friends again.

After the credits, Jinga awakens in Makai and reunites with Amily. When Messiah awakens from her dormant state, Jinga decides to fight the giant Horror himself.

== Production ==
The film was announced back in July 2017 alongside the third animated Garo series, Garo: Vanishing Line. It is got an exclusive screening at the 30th Tokyo International Film Festival on October 31, 2017. Like the previous films, Keita Amemiya will direct and write the film's script while part of the cast from the previous film returns to reprise their roles in the sequel. He was happy on the announcement of the next film, and that he "will look forward on the film's release." The cast also expressed their thoughts on their roles in the film, with Wataru Kuriyama saying that he's happy that he appeared on the film festival for the first time and also discussing about the film, he said that "I noticed that when I grow older, I wanted to show how strong Ryuga is so I adapted that to his personality. Ma-kun (Masahiro Inoue) and I included a special scenario in the film after talking to him about it." Later, on an interview with the film's cast in Nico Nico Live, Ikeda stated that "I was happy to reprise my role after four to five years since Garo: Yami o Terasu Mono and rarely have the opportunity to do the same role again." Amemiya said also in the interview that "The film, alongside Gold Storm Sho was meant to be released together, but I got some difficulties with the schedule of both film and series and that its difficult to put out all the cast in one movie. But I want it to take it properly if I wish." He also said that the film will have connections to Gold Storm Sho, especially with the return of Jinga.

== Cast ==
- Ryuga Dougai (道外 流牙, Dōgai Ryūga): Wataru Kuriyama (栗山 航, Kuriyama Wataru)
- Takeru Jakuzure (蛇崩 猛竜, Jakuzure Takeru): Junya Ikeda (池田 純矢, Ikeda Jun'ya)
- Aguri Kusugami (楠神 哀空吏, Kusugami Aguri): Tsunenori Aoki (青木 玄徳, Aoki Tsunenori)
- Jinga (ジンガ): Masahiro Inoue (井上 正大, Inoue Masahiro)
- Rian (莉杏): Miki Nanri (南里 美希, Nanri Miki)
- Ryume (リュメ): Sakina Kuwae (桑江 咲菜, Kuwae Sakina)
- D Ringo (D・リンゴ): Shigeru Izumiya (泉谷 しげる, Izumiya Shigeru)
- Yukihime (ユキヒメ): Momoko Kuroki (黒木 桃子, Kuroki Momoko)
- Amily (アミリ, Amiri): Miyavi Matsunoi (松野井 雅, Matsunoi Miyabi)
- Daigo Akizuki (秋月 ダイゴ, Akizuki Daigo): Tomohito Wakizaki (脇崎 智史, Wakizaki Tomohito)
- Haruna (ハルナ): Moka Komatsu (小松 もか, Komatsu Moka)
- Rinza (リンザ): Sayaka Sasaki (佐咲 紗花, Sasaki Sayaka)
- Banbi (蛮美): Hiroko Yashiki (屋敷 紘子, Yashiki Hiroko)
- Boel (ボエル, Boeru): Cookie (くっきー, Kukkī)
- Iwaki (イワキ): Shigeru Saiki (斉木 しげる, Saiki Shigeru)
- Reiko (レイコ): Ayano Kudo (工藤 綾乃, Kudō Ayano)
- Fuji (風侍, Fūji): Masaki Matsuda (松田 将希, Matsuda Masaki)
- Raiji (雷侍): Shinji Oosawa (大澤 信児, Ōsawa Shinji)
- Akemi (アケミ): Minori Mikado (神門 実里, Mikado Minori)
- Jagi (ジャギ): Ichizou (一三, Ichizō)
- Judo (ジュドー, Judō): Touma Kawai (河合 透真, Kawai Tōma)
- Messiah (メシア, Meshia): Sho Nishino (西野 翔, Nishino Shō)
- Madō Ring Zaruba (魔導輪ザルバ, Madōrin Zaruba; Voice): Hironobu Kageyama (影山 ヒロノブ, Kageyama Hironobu)

== Theme songs ==
Opening theme

- "Kami no Kiba ~The Fang of Apocalypse~" (神ノ牙～The Fang of Apocalypse～; lit. "Fang of God ～The Fang of Apocalypse～")
  - Lyrics & Composition: Hironobu Kageyama
  - Arrangement: Hisashi Koyama
  - Artist: JAM Project

Ending theme

- "Izayoi no Okuri Uta -ENDING SIDE-" (十六夜の送り歌-ENDING SIDE-; lit. "Song of the Sixteenth Evening -ENDING SIDE")
  - Lyrics: Sumiko Umeda
  - Composition: Masami Okui
  - Arrangement: Shiho Terada, Yoshichika Kuriyama
  - Artist: Sayaka Sasaki
  "Izayoi no Okuri Uta", sung by Masami Okui, is used as an insert song.
