= Kei Sano =

Japanese footballer (born 1992)

Personal information
- Full name: Kei Sano
- Date of birth: 3 April 1992 (age 34)
- Place of birth: Ichinomiya, Aichi, Japan
- Height: 1.72 m (5 ft 8 in)
- Position: Winger

Youth career
- Aichi Kogyo University Meiden HS
- 2014–2015: Aichi Gakuin University

Senior career*
Years	Team	Apps	(Gls)
2020–2022	St. Andrews	24	(8)
2022–2023	Sirens	23	(6)
2023–2024	PSS Sleman	15	(2)
2023–2024	→ Sada Sumut (loan)	8	(2)
2024–2025	Kanchanaburi Power	28	(4)
- * Club domestic league appearances and goals as of 12 February 2025

Kei Sano (Japanese: 佐野 渓; born 3 April 1992) is a Japanese professional footballer who plays as a winger.

== Career ==
=== Early career ===
Sano started his career when he entered college by joining Aichi Kogyo University Meiden HS. Then he joined Aichi Gakuin University from 2014 to 2015.

After that, he had a vacuum from the world of football because he had to take up work outside of football's activities. Because of his love for the world of football, Sano decided to return in 2020. After a year of training, he tried his luck by migrating to Malta.

=== St. Andrews ===
Ahead of 2021–21 season, Sano signed a contract with Maltese Challenge League club St. Andrews. He made his league debut on 7 February 2021, coming on as a substituted in a 2–1 lose against St. George's. On 21 February 2021, He scored his first league goal for the team in a 2–3 away win against Pietà Hotspurs. He contributed with 24 appearances and scored 8 goals in all competitions.

=== Sirens ===
Ahead of 2022–23 season, he was signed by Sirens alongside Gabriel Ventura, and Paulo Vyctor. He made his league debut on 19 August 2022, coming on as a starter in a 2–0 away lose over Birkirkara. On 5 November 2022, Sano scored his first league goal for the club with scored a brace in Maltese Premier League, earning them a 2–0 home win over Gudja United.

On 1 February 2023, Sano scored in a 3–3 draw over Valletta. He then scored his fourth league goal for the club three days later, opening the scoring in a 1–2 home lose against Mosta. On 12 March 2023, Sano scored another brace for Sirens in a 2–1 home win against St. Lucia, In fact, with four matches to go, Sirens are fifth from bottom on 25 points, eleven ahead of Żebbuġ and fourteen ahead of St. Lucia. He contributed with 23 league appearances, scored 6 goals during his 2022–23 season.

=== PSS Sleman ===
On 28 April 2023, Sano signed a contract with Liga 1 club PSS Sleman, he will join fellow new signings Jonathan Bustos and Esteban Vizcarra as well as new head coach Marian Mihail at the Maguwoharjo Stadium for the upcoming season. Sano made his Liga 1 debut on 1 July 2023 as a starter in a 0–1 away win over Bali United.

== Personal life ==
Kei Sano has a twin brother, Gaku Sano who is a Japanese actor, best known for his role as Kouta Kazuraba, the main character of the Kamen Rider series Kamen Rider Gaim.

== Career statistics ==
=== Club ===
As of 18 December 2023

Club	Season	League			Cup		Continental		Other		Total	
Club	Season	Division	Apps	Goals	Apps	Goals	Apps	Goals	Apps	Goals	Apps	Goals
St. Andrews	2020–21	Maltese Challenge League	5	1	2	0	–		0	0	7	1
St. Andrews	2021–22	Maltese Challenge League	19	7	2	0	–		0	0	21	7
Sirens	2022–23	Maltese Premier League	23	6	2	1	–		0	0	25	7
PSS Sleman	2023–24	Liga 1	15	2	0	0	–		0	0	15	2
Sada Sumut (loan)	2023–24	Liga 2	6	2	0	0	–		0	0	6	2
Career total			68	18	6	1	0	0	0	0	74	19
