= Yuumi Shida =

Japanese model and actress (born 1997)

- 志田 友美
- Born: February 11, 1997 (age 29); Ichinoseki, Iwate Prefecture, Japan
- Other names: Yuumin
- Occupations: Model, actress
- Years active: 2008 — present
- Agent: FirstOrder
- Known for: Kamen Rider Gaim as Mai Takatsukasa/Maiden of Fate
- Height: 160 cm (5 ft 3 in)
- Spouse: unknown (m. 2022)
- Children: 1
- Website: https://www.shidayuumi.jp/

Yuumi Shida (志田 友美, Shida Yūmi; born February 11, 1997, in Ichinoseki, Iwate Prefecture, Japan) is a Japanese model and actress who is affiliated with FirstOrder. She is best known for her role as Mai Takatsukasa/Maiden of Fate, the main heroine of the Kamen Rider series Kamen Rider Gaim.

== Biography ==
In 2008, Shida won the 16th Pichimo Audition Grand Prize. In 2008, she debuted in the television drama, Triangle. In June 2012, Shida became a member of the idol group Yumemiru Adolescence. In April 2013, she graduated from Pichi Lemon. On May 1, 2013, Shida became an exclusive model in the June issue of Popteen. On September 22, 2014, her first solo photo book, Yuumi was released. On April 22, 2015, Shida (as Mai Takatsukasa) sang in her first solo single "Lights of My Wish".

She graduated from Yumemiru Adolescence on December 20, 2019. Her first photobook after graduation from the group, RESTART, was released on May 12, 2021.

On June 30, 2021, she announced on Twitter that she had left Tambourine Artists due to her contract expiring.

On April 29, 2022, she announced on her YouTube channel and Instagram profile that she had married a non-celebrity, and will be expecting a child in summer 2022. On July 30, she gave birth to a baby girl.

== Discography ==
=== Singles ===
Year	Title	Other notes
2015	Lights of my wish	Original Video Gaim Gaiden: Kamen Rider Zangetsu/Kamen Rider Baron Zantsuki Hen theme song
2016	Shakunetsu Summer 〜SUMMER KING × SUMMER QUEEN〜	as part of sub-unit Shida Summer Arai Summer!, with Hitomi Arai
2016	Anna ni Suki Datta Summer / GO GO Summer!	Shida Summer Arai Summer! second single

== Filmography ==
=== TV series ===
Year	Title	Role	Network	Other notes
2009	Triangle	Katsurage Sachie	Kansai TV	
2010-2011	Ichigo Ichie 〜Kimi no Kotoba〜	Mi-ko, Mori-san	Kids Station	Anime original voice
2010-2012	Shimajirō Hesoka	Herself, Rika Sanjo	TSC	Appeared as herself in Kiramote Check from its debut on April 4, 2010 until September 2010 and as Rika on Oshiete! 3 Shimai from October 11, 2010 until its end on March 26, 2012, and also appeared on the "Kurukuruin!" music video.
2011	Getsuyō Golden Keiji Shoot 3: Shuto & Muko no Jiken Nisshi	Asuka Karasawa	TBS	(girl's term) role
2013-2014	Kamen Rider Gaim	Mai Takatsukasa / Maiden of Fate	TV Asahi	Double Role
2017	Kimi wa Pet	Rumi Shibusawa	Fuji TV	Support Role
2017	Keiji Shichinin	old-clothes store clerk	TV Asahi	Season 3 Episode 6
2017	Tetsujin Ganriser Zero	Ishigami Oka	TV iwate	
2017-2018	Saki	Awai Ōhoshi	TBS/ MBS	TV Mini-series
2018	Tetsujin Ganriser Tohoku Heros	Ishigami Oka / Tetsujin Ganriser SAKURA	TV iwate	Double Role

=== Films ===
Year	Title	Role	Other notes
2013	Kamen Rider × Kamen Rider Gaim & Wizard: The Fateful Sengoku Movie Battle	Mai Takatsukasa / Maiden of Fate	Double Role
2014	Heisei Rider vs. Shōwa Rider: Kamen Rider Taisen feat. Super Sentai	Mai Takatsukasa	
2014	Kamen Rider Gaim: Great Soccer Battle! Golden Fruits Cup!	Mai Takatsukasa	
2014	Kamen Rider × Kamen Rider Drive & Gaim: Movie War Full Throttle	Mai Takatsukasa	
2015	Nou Shou Sakuretsu Girl	Reiko Ajita	
2015	Gaim Gaiden: Kamen Rider Baron	Mai Takatsukasa	V-Cinema
2015	Gaim Gaiden: Kamen Rider Knuckle	Mai Takatsukasa	V-Cinema
2016	Toire no Hanako-san Shinsho: Hanako vs Yosuke	Shizukune	
2017	SUPER Horrifying Story 2	Kasumi	
2018	Saki Achiga-hen episode of side-A	Awai Ōhoshi	
2018	Uma no Hone	Tamiko Inamori	

=== Games ===
Year	Title	Role	Other notes
2015	Xuccess Heaven	Kokoro Bōryū, Green Academy	game original voice

== Bibliography ==
Year	Title	Author	Publisher	
2014	Shida Yuumi 1st Solo Photo Book: YUUMI	Yuumi Shida, Karaki Takao	Shueisha	ISBN 978-4087807387
2015	Seifuku o nugi saru hi	Yuumi Shida, Shūsaku Kuriyama	Shueisha	digital
2017	YUUMI?	Yuumi Shida, Sanbe Yasutomo	Shueisha	digital
2019	'Bikyaku Tenshi wa Yume o Miru' FRIDAY digital photo collection	Yuumi Shida, Karaki Takao	Shueisha	digital
2019	Seijuku -	Yuumi Shida, Hasui Motohiko	Shueisha	digital
2019	WPB Shida Yuumi Digital Sashin-shū ~ Tokusō Gappon-ban ~	Yuumi Shida, Shūsaku Kuriyama, Hasui Motohiko, Sanbe Yasutomo, Karaki Takao	Shueisha	digital collection with 4 of her previous photo albums
2019	FLASH Digital Shashin-shū Yuumi Shida Idol no Tamashī wa Bikyaku ni Idol	Yuumi Shida, Saijō Akihito	Kobunsha	digital
2021	RESTART	Yuumi Shida	Kadokawa	ISBN 978-4046051158
