= Atsushi Shiramata =

Japanese actor (born 1994)

- 白又 敦
- Born: March 22, 1994 (age 31); Kanagawa Prefecture, Japan
- Occupation: Actor
- Years active: 2005 - present
- Agent: G-Star.Pro
- Height: 176 cm (5 ft 9 in)

Atsushi Shiramata (白又 敦, Shiramata Atsushi; born March 22, 1994, in Kanagawa Prefecture, Japan) is a Japanese actor.

== Biography ==
Shiramata was a member of Johnny & Associates around 2005. In 2008, he was nominated in the 5th D-Boys audition. Shiramata later became affiliated with Watanabe Entertainment and joined D2 in December 2010.

On March 29, 2019, Shiramata graduated from D-Boys and left Watanabe Entertainment. On July 1, 2020, Shiramata joined G-Star.Pro.

Shiramata's personality traits include honesty and not lying. In Kamen Rider Gaim, while playing Ryoji Hase, the staff asked him to bring out his own personality. His co-star Ryo Matsuda said that he resembled in the character in being gentle with a strong hungry spirit part.

In Kamen Rider Gaim, Shiramata was given stern words from director Hidenori Ishida and shed tears on the set. However, as a result, he was able to break away from the affected acting of an ikemen star. Ishida praised Shiramata's performance after filming, as did the screenwriter Gen Urobuchi.

== Filmography ==
=== TV series ===
Year	Title	Role	Network	Notes
2012	Teen Court: 10-dai Saiban		NTV	Episode 7
2013	Mischievous Kiss: Love in Tokyo	Ryō Takamiya	Fuji TV Two	Episodes 11 to 16
2014	Kamen Rider Gaim	Ryoji Hase / Kamen Rider Kurokage	TV Asahi	
2014	Hero		Fuji TV	Episode 9

=== Films ===
Year	Title	Role	Notes
2013	Kamen Rider × Kamen Rider Gaim & Wizard: The Fateful Sengoku Movie Battle	Ryoji Hase / Kamen Rider Kurokage	
2014	Kamen Rider Gaim: Great Soccer Battle! Golden Fruits Cup!	Ryoji Hase / Kamen Rider Kurokage	
