= Gamon Kaai =

- 河相 我聞
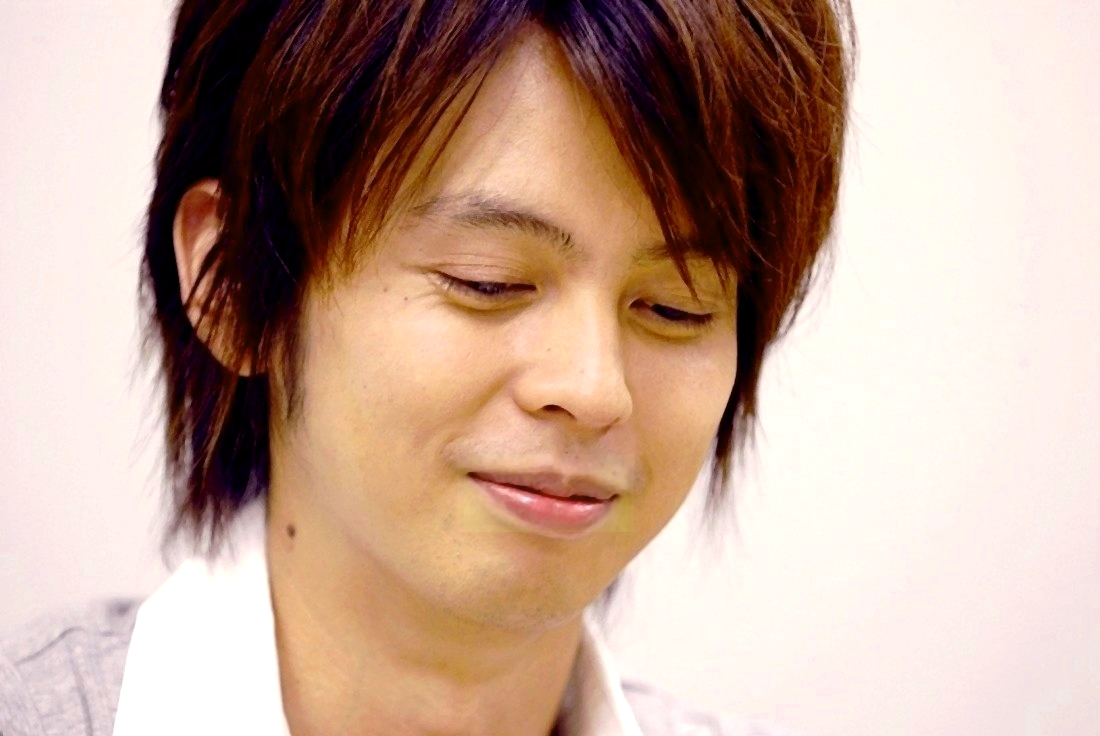
- Born: May 24, 1975 (age 50); Ōmiya (now Saitama), Saitama Prefecture, Japan
- Occupations: Actor, tarento, narrator, television host, drummer
- Years active: 1990–present
- Agents: Kabushikigaisha Gamon; 365
- Known for: Ten Made Todoke; Miseinen; Minikui Ahiru no Ko; Midori no Machi; Kui Shin Bō!
- Relatives: Sara Kaai (daughter); Ryuto (son)
- Website: Official website; Official profile

Gamon Kaai (河相 我聞, Kaai Gamon; born May 24, 1975, in Warabi, Saitama, and moved to Ōmiya (now Saitama), Saitama Prefecture, Japan) is a Japanese actor and tarento represented by Kabushikigaisha Gamon and 365.

Kaai's surname is often pronounced as "Kawai."

== Filmography ==
=== TV series ===
Year	Title	Role	Notes	Ref.
1991–99	Ten Made Todoke	Shinpei Maruyama	8 seasons	
2020	The Road to Murder	Hayato Shigemori	Miniseries	

=== Films ===
Year	Title	Role	Notes	Ref.
2021	The Road to Murder: The Movie	Hayato Shigemori		
2022	Sun and Bolero	Tatsuo Kataoka		
2026	Piccola Felicità			
