= Gaku Matsuda =

Japanese actor

- 松田 岳
- Born: November 20, 1992 (age 33); Hyogo Prefecture, Japan
- Occupation: Actor
- Years active: 2011–present
- Agent: Blue Shuttle
- Height: 181 cm (5 ft 11 in)
- Website: Official profile

Gaku Matsuda (松田 岳, Matsuda Gaku; born November 20, 1992, in Hyogo Prefecture, Japan) is a Japanese actor who is affiliated with Blue Shuttle. His blood type is O.

== Biography ==
Matsuda joined the Himawari Theatre Group from his mother's recommendation, and was active in many commercials at a young age. In a motive of "necessary to examination of high school", he learned to dance from the time of his junior year for three years. Matsuda graduated from the theater department of Hyogo Takarazuka North High School, to learn performing arts at university.

In 2012, he debuted in the stage play, Musical Nintama Rantaro, as Monjiro Shioe. Matsuda played a colleague in the film, Nintama Rantaro Natsuyasumi Shukudai Dai sakusen! no Dan. The same year, he served in a main role for the stage play, Zero of the agency produced, and followed in Zero Fighter and Mibu Ro.

In 2013, Matsuda made regular appearances in Kamen Rider Gaim as Zack / Kamen Rider Knuckle.

== Filmography ==
=== TV series ===
Year	Title	Role	Network	Other notes
2013	Kamen Rider Gaim	Zack / Kamen Rider Knuckle	TV Asahi	

=== Films ===
Year	Title	Role	Other notes
2013	Kamen Rider × Kamen Rider Gaim & Wizard: The Fateful Sengoku Movie Battle	Zack	
2014	Kamen Rider Gaim: Great Soccer Battle! Golden Fruits Cup!	Zack / Kamen Rider Knuckle	
2014	Kamen Rider × Kamen Rider Drive & Gaim: Movie War Full Throttle	Zack	

=== Stage ===
Year	Title	Role	Additional Notes	Source
2018	2.5次元ダンスライブ「ツキウタ。」ステージ 第6幕『紅縁』	Yayoi Haru		
2018	2.5次元ダンスライブ「ツキウタ。」ステージ 第7幕『CYBER-DIVE-CONNECTION』	Yayoi Haru		
2019	2.5次元ダンスライブ「ツキウタ。」ステージ	Yayoi Haru		
2019	舞台『Collar×Malice -岡崎契編-』	Kageyuki Shiraishi		
2019	2.5次元ダンスライブ「ツキウタ。」ステージ 第9幕『しあわせあわせ』	Yayoi Haru		
2020	2.5次元ダンスライブ「ツキウタ。」ステージ 第10幕「月歌奇譚 太極伝奇」	Yayoi Haru	Performances starting from April 5, 2020 were cancelled due to COVID-19	
2021	舞台『Collar×Malice -榎本峰雄編＆笹塚尊編-』	Kageyuki Shiraishi	Originally scheduled for run in 2020 - Postponed to 2021 due to COVID-19	
2021	劇団『ドラマティカ』ACT1／西遊記悠久奇譚	Gyokuryu / Nagisa Ran		
2022	『あんさんぶるスターズ！THE STAGE』-Track to Miracle-	Nagisa Ran		
2022	劇団『ドラマティカ』ACT2 / Phantom and Invisible Resonance	Guy Ferdinand / Nagisa Ran	Kyoto performances cancelled due to COVID-19	
2022	『あんさんぶるスターズ！THE STAGE』-Witness of Miracle-	Nagisa Ran		
2022	舞台『Collar×Malice -白石景之編-』	Kageyuki Shiraishi		
2023	舞台『Collar×Malice -柳愛時編-』	Kageyuki Shiraishi		
2023	『あんさんぶるスターズ！THE STAGE』-Party Live-	Nagisa Ran		
2023	舞台「文豪ストレイドッグス 共喰い」	Ivan Goncharov		
2023	舞台「転生したらスライムだった件」	Gabiru		
2023	劇団『ドラマティカ』ACT3／カラ降るワンダフル	Mad Hatter / Nagisa Ran		
2024	HIGH CARD the STAGE - Crack a Hand／ハイカステージ	Vijay Kumar Singh		
2024	舞台「フルーツバスケット The Final」	God, Akira Sohma		
2025	ミュージカル「贄姫と獣の王〜the KING of BEASTS〜」	Gleipnir		
