= Metal Yoshida =

- 吉田 メタル
- Born: Takaya Yoshida; November 1, 1971 (age 54); Nonoichi, Kanazawa, Ishikawa Prefecture, Japan
- Other name: Metal
- Occupations: Actor, musician
- Years active: 1992–present
- Agent: Village
- Height: 1.85 m (6 ft 1 in)
- Spouse: Hiromi Iwasaki (2007–present)
- Musical career
- Instrument: Bass guitar
- Member of: Ninjaman Japan
- Website: Official profile

Takaya Yoshida (吉田 貴哉, Yoshida Takaya; born November 1, 1971, in Nonoichi, Kanazawa, Ishikawa Prefecture, Japan), better known as Metal Yoshida (吉田 メタル, Yoshida Metaru), is a Japanese actor and musician who is represented by the talent agency, Village, and belongs to Gekidan Shin Kan-sen. He is the bassist of the visual kei rock band, Ninjaman Japan, and is nicknamed Metal.

Yoshida graduated from Kanazawa Nishioka High School and Higashiho Gakuen College. His wife is actress Hiromi Iwasaki.

== Biography ==
In 1992, Yoshida joined to Gekidan Shin Kan-sen and his acting debut was in the stage play, Gorō ni Omakase. In addition, his performances were guest conductors in various works and activities in stage musicals. In 2013, Yoshida also deals with the production for the Gekidan Brats' performance, Red Kill: Makkanauso no Kakikata.

In 2009, together with Psycho le Cému, they formed the visual kei rock band, Ninjaman Japan, which started his music career as the bassist nicknamed Metal.

In 2013, Yoshida appeared in the TV Asahi series, Kamen Rider Gaim, as the character Oren Pierre Alfonso / Kamen Rider Bravo.

In his private life, he married actress Hiromi Iwasaki on April 15, 2007. They reportedly dated on 2006 in the musical, Peter Pan. They later have two daughters.

== Filmography ==
=== TV series ===
Year	Title	Role	Network	Notes
1997	Timekeeper's		Fuji TV	
1999	Keizoku	Takeshi Kaneko	TBS	
2006	Saiyūki		Fuji TV	Final episode
2008	Last Mail		BS Asahi	Episode 5
2009	Otokomae!2		NHK	Episode 8
2010	Unubore Keiji	Kiyoshi Baba	TBS	Episode 8
2011	Orenosora Keiji-hen	Big man of skin head	TV Asahi	
2013	Kamen Rider Gaim	Oren Pierre Alfonso / Kamen Rider Bravo	TV Asahi	
2015	Uroborosu: Kono Ai Koso, Seigi	Katsuji Takigawa	TBS	Episode 1
2020	Kamen Rider Saber	Oren Pierre Alfonso	TV Asahi	Episode 8

=== Films ===
Year	Title	Role	Notes
2014	Kamen Rider Gaim: Great Soccer Battle! Golden Fruits Cup!	Oren Pierre Alfonso / Kamen Rider Bravo	
2014	Kamen Rider × Kamen Rider Drive & Gaim: Movie War Full Throttle	Oren Pierre Alfonso	
