= Ryo Matsuda =

Japanese actor

- 松田 凌
- Born: September 13, 1991 (age 34); Amagasaki, Hyōgo Prefecture, Japan
- Occupation: Actor
- Years active: 2011–present
- Agent: Cast Corporation
- Height: 169 cm (5 ft 7 in)
- Website: Official profile

Ryo Matsuda (松田 凌, Matsuda Ryō; born September 13, 1991, in Amagasaki, Hyōgo Prefecture, Japan) is a Japanese actor who is represented by the talent agency Cast Corporation.

== Biography ==
During high school, Matsuda appeared in the stage play, Urasuji3, and decided to become an actor. In April 2010, he moved to Tokyo, and later he belonged to his current office in 2011. In the same year, Matsuda's acting debut was in an advertisement for Osaka University of Human Sciences.

In 2012, his first starring role was in the stage musical, Hakuōki. Later on, Matsuda later starred in the stage plays, Messiah: Dō no Shō and Zipang Pirates, and appeared in other stage plays.

In 2013, he made regular appearances as Hideyasu Jonouchi / Kamen Rider Gridon in Kamen Rider Gaim.

In 2021, Matsuda got his role as Kashuu Kiyomitsu in Touken Ranbu Stage. His first debut was on Aozora no Tsuwamono -Osaka Fuyu no Jin-

== Filmography ==
=== TV series ===
Year	Title	Role	Network	Notes
2013	Kamen Rider Gaim	Hideyasu Jounochi / Kamen Rider Gridon	TV Asahi	
2015	Messiah: Eisei no Shō	Eiri Kaidou	Tokyo MX	
2020	Kamen Rider Saber	Hideyasu Jounochi	TV Asahi	Episode 8

=== Films ===
Year	Title	Role	Notes	Ref.
2011	Miss Boys! Kessen wa Kōshien!? Hen	Eiji Nitta		
2012	Miss Boys! Yūjō no Yukue-hen	Eiji Nitta		
2013	Messiah: Shikkoku no Shō	Eiri Kaidou		
2013	Kamen Rider × Kamen Rider Gaim & Wizard: The Fateful Sengoku Movie Battle	Hideyasu Jonouchi / Kamen Rider Gridon		
2014	Kamen Rider Gaim: Great Soccer Battle! Golden Fruits Cup!	Hideyasu Jonouchi / Kamen Rider Gridon		
2014	Kamen Rider × Kamen Rider Drive & Gaim: Movie War Full Throttle	Hideyasu Jonouchi		
2015	Lychee Light Club	Raizo		
2022	Shikkokuten			

=== Stage ===
Year	Title	Role	Notes	Ref.
2025	Cherry Magic! Thirty Years of Virginity Can Make You a Wizard?!	Kiyoshi Adachi		
