= Gaku Sano =

Japanese actor

- 佐野 岳
- Born: April 3, 1992 (age 34); Aichi Prefecture, Japan
- Occupation: Actor
- Years active: 2012–present
- Known for: Kōta Kazuraba (Kamen Rider Gaim)
- Spouse: Keiko Sawaguchi (m. 2023)
- Relatives: Kei Sano (twin brother)
- Website: http://www.gakufc.com/

Gaku Sano (佐野 岳, Sano Gaku; born April 3, 1992) is a Japanese actor, best known for his role as Kouta Kazuraba, the main character of the Kamen Rider series Kamen Rider Gaim. He was the winner of the Junon Super Boy Contest 2011.

== Biography ==
From an early age, Sano took part in the Junon Super Boy Contest. In November 2011, as a college student, he was awarded the Grand Prix from among 13,228 applicants in the same contest.

In February 2012, he made his acting debut in the theatre play Sakura. He has appeared in TV dramas and variety shows. Sano appeared in Geinō-kai tokugi-ō kettei-sen Teppen and All-Star Thanksgiving. In 2012 he was the winner of the sports competition reality television show "Sports Danshi Grand Prix", which was the reboot version of TBS's sports competition reality show Pro Sportsman No.1.

In 2013, Sano made his film debut in a main role of the film The Road Less Travelled (「また、必ず会おう」と誰もが言った。, "Mata, kanarazu aou" to daremo ga itta) based on a novel of the same name by Yasushi Kitagawa (喜多川泰). In the same year, he starred in the Kamen Rider series Kamen Rider Gaim, which was Sano's first main role in a TV drama.

== Personal life ==
Gaku Sano and his twin brother, Kei Sano (佐野 渓) were born on April 3, 1992. While Gaku begin his acting career in early 2010s where he was cast as a titular protagonist of Kamen Rider Gaim in 2013, his brother, Kei joined a soccer club at Aichi Gakuin University during his college year in 2014 - 2015, before pursuing a professional soccer career in the 2020s. He was recruited to join St. Andrews F.C. in 2021 - 2022, Sirens F.C. in 2022 - 2023 and is currently being recruited to PSS Sleman as of 2023.

In May 2023, Sano announces his marriage to the former predia idol member, Keiko Sawaguchi after dating for 7 years.

== Filmography ==
=== TV series ===
Year	Title	Role	Other notes	Ref.
2020	The Yagyu Conspiracy	Hayate	TV movie	
2024	Red Blue	Kanenari Tokiwa		

=== Films ===
Year	Title	Role	Other notes	Ref.
2020	Restart After Coming Back Home	Ueda		
2020	The Samejima Incident			
2022	2 Women			
2023	Okashiratsuki	adult Kaisei Utsumi		
2024	11 Rebels			
2025	49 nichi no Shinjitsu	Yasushi Yokoyama		
2026	The Village of Eight Gravestones			
