= Shōnan no Kaze discography =

- Studio albums: 4
- Compilation albums: 2
- Singles: 11
- B-sides: 9
- Video albums: 2
- Music videos: 13

The discography of Japanese reggae band Shōnan no Kaze consists of four studio albums, two compilation albums, two live DVDs, and 11 singles.

== Studio albums ==
Year	Album Information	Oricon Albums Charts	Reported sales
2003	Shōnan no Kaze: Real Riders (湘南乃風～Ｒｅａｌ Ｒｉｄｅｒｓ～): Released: July 30, 2003; Label: Toy's Factory (TFCC-86138); Formats: CD, digital download	60	61,000
2004	Shōnan no Kaze: Ragga Parade (湘南乃風～ラガパレード～): Released: August 18, 2004; Label: Toy's Factory (TFCC-86165); Formats: CD, digital download	5	189,000
2006	Shōnan no Kaze: Riders High (湘南乃風 ～Ｒｉｄｅｒｓ Ｈｉｇｈ～): Released: August 30, 2006; Label: Toy's Factory (TFCC-86204); Formats: CD, digital download	1	501,373
2009	Shōnan no Kaze: Joker (湘南乃風 ～ＪＯＫＥＲ～): Released: April 8, 2009; Label: Toy's Factory (TFCC-86295); Formats: CD, digital download	1	236,000

== Compilation albums ==
Year	Album Information	Oricon Albums Charts	Reported sales
2006	Massive B Meets Shōnan no Kaze: Osu!! Kyokutō Dancehall-han (マッシヴ・B・ミーツ・湘南乃風-押忍!!極東ダンスホール塾, Massive B meets Shōnan no Kaze: Hey! Far East Dancehall Edition): Dancehall artists compilation selected by Shōnan no Kaze.; Released: February 22, 2006; Label: Fiveman Army (FMAR-29); Formats: CD, digital download	161	3,600
2007	134°C Toketa Manma de Icchatte! Senkyoku Shōnan no Kaze (134°C溶けたまんまでイッちゃって!選曲 湘南乃風, Just Thawed at 134°C! Song Selection Shōnan no Kaze): Dancehall artists compilation selected by Shōnan no Kaze.; Released: July 18, 2007; Label: Fiveman Army (POCE-15510); Formats: CD, digital download	43	14,000
2010	Shōnan no Kaze: Shōnan Bakuon Breaks! Mixed by the BK Sound by Shōnan no Kaze (湘南乃風 ～湘南爆音BREAKS! ～mixed by The BK Sound, Shōnan Roar Breaks!): Mix CD featuring Shōnan no Kaze's uptempo songs.; Released: August 4, 2010; Label: Toy's Factory (TFCC-86330); Formats: CD, digital download	TBA	TBA

== Singles ==
Release	Title	Notes	Chart positions			Oricon sales	Album
Release	Title	Notes	Oricon Singles Charts	Billboard Japan Hot 100*	RIAJ digital tracks*	Oricon sales	Album
2003	"Real Riders"	Radio single.	—	—	—		Shōnan no Kaze: Real Riders
2004	"Ōenka/Kaze" (応援歌/風; Cheering Song/Wind)		19	—	—	70,000	Shōnan no Kaze: Ragga Parade
2004	"Hare Densetsu" (晴伝説; Sunny Legend)		13	—	—	43,000	Shōnan no Kaze: Ragga Parade
2005	"Karasu" (カラス; Crow)		10	—	—	69,000	Shōnan no Kaze: Riders High
2005	"Saboten" (覇王樹; Cactus)		15	—	—	44,000	Shōnan no Kaze: Riders High
2006	"Junrenka" (純恋歌; Pure Love Song)		2	—	—	550,000	Shōnan no Kaze: Riders High
2007	"Suirenka" (睡蓮花; Water Lily)		2	—	—	119,000	Shōnan no Kaze: Joker
2008	"Ōgon Soul" (黄金魂, Ōgon Sōru; Gold Soul)	THE NEGOTIATOR drama theme song	6	—	—	74,000	Shōnan no Kaze: Joker
2008	"Koi Shigure" (恋時雨; Love Shower)		6	5	—	52,000	Shōnan no Kaze: Joker
2009	"Tomo yo" (親友よ; I'm Your Friend)		10	15	—	25,000	Shōnan no Kaze: Joker
2010	"Gachizakura" (ガチ桜, Elegant Cherry Blossom)		8	11	2	29,000	Shōnan no Kaze: Single Best
2011	"Bomberman" (爆音男 〜BOMBERMAN〜)		4			20,000	Shōnan no Kaze: Single Best
2012	"Entenka" (炎天夏; "Summer Under Burning Sun")		7	7	1	16,000	Shōnan no Kaze ~2013~
2012	"Setsugekka" (雪月花; "Snow Moon Flower")		12				Shōnan no Kaze ~2013~
2013	"Just Live More"	Kamen Rider Gaim theme song as "Gaim no Kaze"	6	8			TBA
2013	"Your Song"	Kamen Rider Gaim: Great Soccer Battle! Golden Fruits Cup! ending song as "Gaim no Kaze"	16	85			TBA
2014	"Puzzle" (パズル)		8	6		8,888	Shōnan no Kaze: COME AGAIN
2015	"Bubble" (バブル)	Yakuza 0 theme song	14				Shōnan no Kaze: COME AGAIN
2019	"Ichibanka" (一番歌)	Yakuza: Like a Dragon theme song; in collaboration with Yasutaka Nakata	—	—	—		N/A
2020	"Tadaima!" (ただいま！)		—	—	—		N/A

*Japan Hot 100 established February 2008, RIAJ Digital Track Chart established April 2009. †still charting.

== DVDs ==
- Kaze Densestu: Itsumo Dareka no Sei ni Shite Bakkari Datta Ore Tour 2006 (風伝説 いつも誰かのせいにしてばっかりだった俺TOUR 2006, Wind Legend: Me that was Always Just Doing Things for Others Tour 2006)
- Kaze Densestu: Nureta Manma de Icchatte Tour '09 (風伝説～濡れたまんまでイッちゃってTOUR '09～, Wind Legend: Gotta Be Still Wet Tour '09)
