= Saboten =

Saboten (Japanese: "cactus") may refer to:

- Saboten (pop-punk band), a Japanese rock band founded in 1999
- Saboten (all-female band), avant-garde Tokyo all-female band of the 1980s
- "Saboten" (song), a 2000 song by Porno Graffitti
- "Saboten", a 1982 song by Shonen Knife from Minna Tanoshiku

== See also ==
- Saboten Con, annual four-day anime convention held during September at the Sheraton Grand Phoenix in Phoenix, Arizona
- Sabotin
