= Shōnan no Kaze =

Japanese band

Shōnan no Kaze 湘南乃風
- Origin: Kanagawa Prefecture, Japan
- Genres: J-pop, reggae, dancehall, hip hop, ska punk, EDM
- Years active: 2001–present
- Labels: 134 Recordings (2001–2003); Toy's Factory (2003–2018); Universal Music Japan (2020-present)
- Members: Red Rice; Wakadanna; Shock Eye; Han-Kun
- Past members: Goki
- Website: Shonan no Kaze Official Website

Shōnan no Kaze (湘南乃風, Shōnan Wind) is a Japanese four member reggae band. They are best known for their 2006 hit song Junrenka (純恋歌, Pure Love Song), which was one of the top songs of 2006. They sold 2.5 million copies in Japan.

== Biography ==
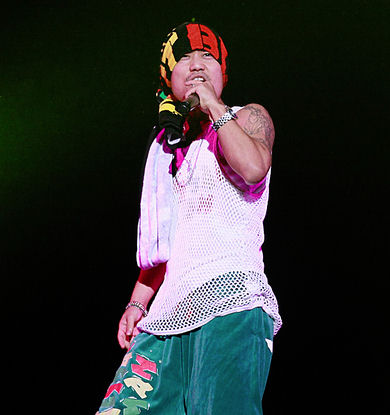
Han-kun of Shōnan no Kaze performing at the Hibiki Music Festival 2009

The band's roots were first formed when Red Rice and Han-kun first performed together in Shōnan in central coastal Japan. Han-kun first formed an interest in reggae after by chance hearing Buju Banton's song "Untold Stories" in a friend's girlfriend's car, after coming home from a dance. Red Rice was a casual fan of reggae/hip-hop, until attending festivals which made him develop a great love of these genres. The pair met Shock Eye while performing, who previously worked as a hip-hop DJ. Shock Eye was friends with Wakadanna in high school, and met him again by chance in Shōnan. Wakadanna had been managing a reggae bar in Shōnan.

From 2001 onwards, the band worked together, having songs featured on compilation albums and collaborating with other artists. The band made their major label debut in 2003, under Toy's Factory.

The band's second album Shōnan no Kaze: Ragga Parade reached #5 on Oricon charts, after two top 20 singles. The band had a hit song in 2006, "Junrenka" (純恋歌, Pure Love Song). It sold over 520,000 copies and was the 8th biggest hit of 2006. The follow-up album, Shōnan no Kaze: Riders High, reached #1.

The band has had other hits since then, such as "Ōgon Soul," "Koi Shigure" and "Gachi-zakura." The band's 4th album, Shōnan no Kaze: Joker, reached #1 on Oricon charts as well.

In 2012, the group provided the song "Born to be Wild" from their 2012 Entenka album for their first Yakuza title, Kurohyō 2: Ryū ga Gotoku Ashura hen (Japanese: クロヒョウ2 龍が如く 阿修羅編; lit. "Black Panther: Like a Dragon Ashura Chapter"), for the final boss fight with Nozaki Ryo. The song is also part of the game's official soundtrack.

Han-kun released a solo-album in 2008. The band released the first of their planned "Best of" albums on March 6, 2013.

In 2013, the group provided the song "Just Live More" for the TV series Kamen Rider Gaim under the name Gaim no Kaze (鎧武乃風, Gaimu no Kaze).

In 2015, the group provided the opening song for their second Yakuza game Yakuza 0, titled "Bubble", and its ending, titled "Kurenai".

In 2016, the group provided the opening and closing themes "Ike! Tiger Mask" and "KING OF THE WILD" for the anime series Tiger Mask W.

In 2018, the group provided the opening theme for the anime series Grand Blue.

In 2020, the group then provided the ending song for their third Yakuza title Yakuza: Like a Dragon, titled "Ichibanka". Which was also the closing track for their album that released on May 20, 2020 known as "Shihou Senpuu"

In 2022, the group collaborated with singer Koda Kumi with the song "Trust・Last", which was used as the opening theme to the Tokusatsu drama Kamen Rider Geats. In 2023, the group performed "Desire" for the summer movie of Geats.

In 2025, the group provided the opening theme for the second season of anime series Grand Blue.

On March 18, 2026 the group released the new single Ukuiuta followed that would be another new single that released on September 3, 2026 titled [Amanogawa] for the theme song for the next season of ABEMA's reality show.

On October 23, 2026 the group released the new single SARABA as the official theme song for 2026 TV drama Sanada Juyushi: Shadow of the Ten Ninja.

== Discography ==
=== Studio albums ===
1. 2003: Shōnan no Kaze: Real Riders
2. 2004: Shōnan no Kaze: Ragga Parade
3. 2006: Shōnan no Kaze: Riders High
4. 2009: Shōnan no Kaze: Joker
5. 2013: Shōnan no Kaze: 2023
6. 2015: Shōnan no Kaze: COME AGAIN
7. 2018: Shōnan no Kaze: Ichigoichie
8. 2020: Shōnan no Kaze: Shihou Senpuu
9. 2022: 2022: Time to Shine

=== Compilation albums ===
1. 2006: Massive B Meets Shōnan no Kaze: Osu!! Kyokutō Dancehall-han
2. 2007: 134°C Toketa Manma de Icchatte! Senkyoku Shōnan no Kaze
3. 2010: Shōnan no Kaze: Shōnan Bakuon Breaks! Mixed by the BK Sound by Shōnan no Kaze
4. 2011: Shōnan no Kaze ~Single Best~
5. 2011: Shōnan no Kaze ~Live Set Best~
6. 2023: Shōnan no Kaze ~20th Anniversary BEST~

=== Singles ===
1. 2003: Real Riders
2. 2004: Ōenka/Kaze
3. 2004: Hare Densetsu
4. 2005: Karasu
5. 2005: Saboten
6. 2006: Junrenka
7. 2007: Suirenka
8. 2008: Ōgon Soul
9. 2008: Koi Shigure
10. 2009: Tomo yo
11. 2010: Gachizakura
12. 2011: Bomberman
13. 2012: Entenka
14. 2012: Setsugekka
15. 2013: Just Live More
16. 2013: Your Song
17. 2014: Puzzle
18. 2015: Bubble
19. 2019: Ichibanka
20. 2020: Tadaima!
21. 2020: Summers
22. 2020: Ichibanka (Dennoukuukandensetsu Version)
23. 2021: Hiwamatanoboru
24. 2021: Chabashiratatsu
25. 2022: Kazenozidai
26. 2022: Yumemonogatari
27. 2022: Trust・Last TV size Theme of KAMEN RIDER GEATS
28. 2023: Trust・Last (Theme Song of KAMEN RIDER GEATS)
29. 2023: Kimini
30. 2023: Desire Movie Edit
31. 2024: Boukensha
32. 2025: Jinsei Bakusho
33. 2025: SEISHUN TOWA
34. 2026: UKUIUTA
35. 2026: AMANOGAWA
36. 2026: SARABA
