= List of Kamen Rider Gaim episodes =

This is a list of episodes of the 2013–2014 Kamen Rider Series Kamen Rider Gaim.

== Episodes ==
No.	Title	Directed by	Written by	Original release date
1	"Transformation! The Orange From the Sky!?"; Transliteration: "Henshin! Sora kara Orenji!?" (Japanese: 変身！空からオレンジ!?)	Ryuta Tasaki	Gen Urobuchi	October 6, 2013
At the Free Performance Zone in the planned city of Zawame, Mai Takatsukasa of dance group Team Gaim and Zack of the rival Team Baron settle a dispute using Lockseeds, which can summon holograms of monsters called Inves. Peko causes Mai to drop her Lockseed, letting her Inves manifest fully and run amok, but former Team Gaim member Kota Kazuraba arrives and banishes the Inves, losing Mai the match. After discussing the popularity of Inves Games with Team Gaim's leader Yuya Sumii, Kota returns home and asks his older sister Akira when he will be able to "transform" into a self-sufficient adult. Yuya meets with Sid, the Lock Dealer, who gives him a strange belt, and asks Kota to meet up so he can show it to him. When Kota gets to the meeting point, he finds Mai instead of Yuya, and both find a portal similar to the one used to summon Inves, leading to a forest full of strange fruit that become Lockseeds when picked. They soon discover the belt Yuya was talking about and leave the forest, but the White Tiger Inves follows them out of the portal. Kota decides to distract the Inves long enough for Mai to escape and get help. Out of instinct, Kota uses the Orange Lockseed on the belt and transforms into Kamen Rider Gaim, using his newfound power to fight the Inves. As they take their fight up a building, Kota sees a mysterious girl resembling Mai who tells him that he is now bound by fate until he dyes the world in his colors, and shows him how to use his belt to destroy the White Tiger Inves. Just as he processes what has happened, Kota is found by Mai.
2	"Deadly! Pineapple Kick!"; Transliteration: "Hissatsu! Pain Kikku!" (Japanese: 必殺！パインキック！)	Ryuta Tasaki	Gen Urobuchi	October 13, 2013
Kota causes problems at home and at work by constantly transforming into Kamen Rider Gaim. Sometime later, Mai calls Kota to inform him that Yuya is still missing. Kota decides that they should ask Sid about what has been happening. Sid informs the two that the belt that Kota has used is called a Sengoku Driver and it bonds to the first person who wears it, and it is now Kota's destiny to use it to help Team Gaim. In light of the events, Sid tries to give Mai a high class Lockseed. Later, Kota gets a call that Team Baron is at Team Gaim's garage to issue a challenge for their Player Pass with Team Baron's Pine Lockseed and the western stage as the prize. Kota heads to the garage and accepts the challenge, using his Ichigo Lockseed to summon the Deer Inves to defeat Kaito's three Inves. However, Peko decides to cheat again, knocking Kota's Lockseed away from the battle area and causing the Deer Inves to manifest in reality. Kota realizes that protecting people from the summoned Inves is the best way to use his power, and he transforms to fight the Deer Inves. However, the Inves ingests the Ichigo Lockseed and evolves into a higher form, overwhelming Kota. When the Deer Inves prepares to attack Kaito, Kota asks Kaito for the Pine Lockseed and uses its power to destroy the Inves. Elsewhere, at the Yggdrasill Corporation's headquarters, administrator Takatora Kureshima is informed of the appearance of Kamen Rider Gaim.
3	"Shock! The Rival's Banana Transformation!?"; Transliteration: "Shōgeki! Raibaru ga Banana Henshin!?" (Japanese: 衝撃！ライバルがバナナ変身!?)	Takayuki Shibasaki	Gen Urobuchi	October 20, 2013
A week has passed since Kamen Rider Gaim debuted in the Inves Game and Team Gaim's popularity has since risen along with its ranks. Meeting up with Mitsuzane Kureshima as he got out of Tenju Private High School, Kota reveals he found his Team Gaim jacket with the intent to rejoin the group. Meeting up with rest of Team Gaim, Kota reveals to Mai that he quit his jobs to help in Yuya's place. After assuring Mai that it will all work out, Team Gaim begins their performance before Kota wins an Inves challenge by Team Raid Wild. This turn of events, with Team Gaim now in third place, rattles Kaito before he is contacted by Sid who offers him a means to make thing more interesting in the Inves Game. Elsewhere, though he is making money in the Inves Games, Kota finds Akira disappointed with him as she could not accept money from someone that was just abusing his powers to benefit himself instead of using it for the betterment of others. The next day, Kota continues to ponder his thoughts on his sister's words before he is finds himself being criticized by Kaito over his inability to properly use his power. This results in challenge, with Kaito revealing he obtained his own Sengoku Driver and becomes the knight-like Kamen Rider Baron. Intent to show what true power is all about, Baron is about attack when Sid steps in and deems a change of rules is needed while giving the Riders Lock Vehicles so they can settle it in a race. However, the two end up in Helheim Forest with Baron taking out an Inves and marvels at his new power.
4	"He's Appeared! The Third Grape Rider!"; Transliteration: "Tanjō! San-ninme no Budō Raidā!" (Japanese: 誕生！3人目のぶどうライダー！)	Takayuki Shibasaki	Gen Urobuchi	October 27, 2013
Finding themselves in Helheim Forest, Kota reveals to Kaito that he has been in the dimension before. Knowing there are unripened Lockseeds in the area, Kaito wanders off to get some before returning to his world. Kota decides to use this time to find Yuya, but instead finds some researchers before getting into a fight with a mysterious white Kamen Rider. Defeating a Deer Inves, Kamen Rider Gaim is overpowered by the other Rider, who convinces him that his Sengoku Driver is no good before leaving. The next day, after returning from Helheim Forest with high class Lockseeds as bargaining chips, Kaito calls Team Raid Wild's Ryoji Hase and Team Invitto's Hideyasu Jonouchi to set up an alliance among their groups to take out Team Gaim. At that time, Mai and Mitsuzane are called by Akira to check up on Kota, who tells them he is giving up being an Kamen Rider. Taking the Sengoku Driver to Team Gaim's garage, Mai tells Mitsuzane of her experience in Helheim Forest and that they can not rely on Kota anymore for his own good. Confident that Kota will return, Mitsuzane meets up with Sid the following day and uses his status as a member of the Kureshima family to convince the dealer to provide him with a Sengoku Driver. When Team Invitto arrives to Team Gaim's stage with an Ichigo Lockseed, understanding the protecting others means risking his own well being, Mitsuzane reveals his new Sengoku Driver and uses the Budou Lockseed to transform into the gun-wielding Kamen Rider Ryugen.
5	"Return! The Ichigo Arms of Friendship!"; Transliteration: "Fukkatsu! Yūjō no Ichigo Āmuzu!" (Japanese: 復活！友情のイチゴアームズ！)	Takayuki Shibasaki	Gen Urobuchi	November 10, 2013
Mitsuzane uses the Sengoku Driver and Budou Lockseed to become Kamen Rider Ryugen, defeating Jonouchi's Bat Inves. He later has a dream of the mysterious girl as he tells her that he will suffer his new burden for the sake of another. The next day, as Jonouchi meets with Hase to discuss their role as pawns in Kaito's plan, Mitsuzane is found by Kota, who realizes he is Team Gaim's new Rider. Kota warns him that the Sengoku Drivers are dangerous, but Mitsuzane explains that he will take the risk as he is able to take fate into his own hands. Upon finding Mai, Kota learns that she understands Mitsuzane's intentions as they both fight for themselves. However, their talk is interrupted by a call from Chucky that Kaito has come for a challenge and Mitsuzane has accepted it. Upon revealing the Sengoku Driver can summon fully manifested Inves, Kamen Rider Baron overwhelms Ryugen just as Kota and Mai arrive. Unable to enter the barrier, and learning that Ryugen is not giving up because of him, Kota has Mai get his Sengoku Driver. Upon transforming into Gaim, Kota destroys the barrier and duels Baron while Ryugen battles the Inves. Upon telling Baron that true strength is inspiring others, Ryugen gives Gaim the Ichigo Lockseed which he uses to transform into Ichigo Arms. After the Inves are destroyed by Team Gaim's Riders, Jonouchi and Hase reveal that they have obtained their own Sengoku Drivers and transform into Kamen Riders. Elsewhere, Takatora meets Sid over the progress of five of the six Sengoku Drivers distributed, yet is kept in the dark of his younger brother's involvement.
6	"The Durian Rider Appears!"; Transliteration: "Dorian Raidā, Sansen!" (Japanese: ドリアンライダー、参戦！)	Satoshi Morota	Gen Urobuchi	November 17, 2013
After Hase christens themselves Kurokage and Gridon, Jonouchi not happy about the choice of name, the two Kamen Riders suddenly attack Baron and defeat him. Luckily, Kaito is saved by Gaim and Ryugen driving the two new Riders off. Although Kota offers a helping hand, Kaito refuses his help and walks off. The next day, with Mitsuzane serving as Team Gaim's primary Kamen Rider as his team and Team Baron are tied, Kota arrives at the Charmant pastry shop for an interview by the bakery's effeminate owner who turns him down for personal reasons. Mai visits Kota in his apartment to cheer him up, revealing that the Charmant's owner Pierre-Alfonso Oren studied in France to become a patissier. Elsewhere, after leaving Team Baron's headquarters, Team Red Hot's leader Sonomura obtains the last Sengoku Driver. Mitsuzane learns of his brother's possession of a Sengoku Driver while secretly taking a Lockseed from his collection. The next day, Oren suddenly appears at the site of a sparring match between Kurokage and Gridon, revealing that he has the sixth Sengoku Driver in his possession, having confiscated it from Team Red Hot after they were disruptive in the Charmant and because he believes that the Kamen Riders do not truly know how to fight. He transforms using a Durian Lockseed just as Kota arrives to the scene. While explaining to Kota that he finds conflict entertaining and has joined the Kamen Riders as they are not fighting properly, he easily defeats both Kurokage and Gridan singlehandedly, setting his sights on the remaining Riders.
7	"Great Ball Watermelon, Big Bang!"; Transliteration: "Ōdama Suika, Biggu Ban!" (Japanese: 大玉スイカ、ビッグバン！)	Satoshi Morota	Gen Urobuchi	November 24, 2013
Using a Sengoku Driver, Oren transforms into a Kamen Rider, easily defeats Kurokage and Gridon, and relieves them of their Lockseeds. Deeming Oren insane after hearing his idea, Kota walks off. Soon after, the Beat Riders Hotline covers the appeared of the newly named Kamen Rider Bravo. While watching Bravo's interview, Kota is still miffed of Oren's personal attacks on the Beat Riders before Kaito tells him to fight him to shut him up before revealing that he was challenged by Bravo. However, even using his Inves to have the numbers advantage, Baron is defeated by Bravo. Despite his loss, Kaito is allowed to keep his Banana Lockseed as he deems him a worthy opponent. At the Yggdrasill Corporation, a livid Takatora meets up with Sid over this turn of events before their fellow conspirators, Beat Rider Hotline DJ Sagara and Yggdrasill scientist Ryoma Sengoku, convince Takatora not to take any action against Oren. During Team Gaim's show, Oren appears to ruin their performance and defeat Ryugen as Kota transforms into Gaim to offer his support. During the fight, Bravo accidentally unleashes a legion of berserk Inves. Given the Suika Lockseed by Ryugen, Gaim transform into the gigantic Kamen Rider Gaim Suika Arms. With his exoskeleton armor, Gaim brushes most of the Inves and easily takes out Bravo. However, one Inves survives and eats all of Bravo's dropped Lockseeds to become a Boar Inves that proceeds to run off once disarmed. Gaim and Ryugen give chase, the latter managing to stop the giant Inves so Gaim can destroy it. By then, infuriated of being ignored, Bravo reaches the Riders and the fight was about to be resumed when he learns he is needed at Charmant and runs off. The turn of events places Team Gaim into the top ranked spot of the Beat Rider teams. Kota is even more vexed when he notices that Oren has left him a personal note revealing that he has not forgot about their fight.
8	"Baron's New Mango Power"; Transliteration: "Baron no Atarashiki Chikara, Mangō" (Japanese: バロンの新しき力、マンゴー)	Shojiro Nakazawa	Gen Urobuchi; Toriko Nanajo	December 1, 2013
With Team Baron in fourth place and Team Gaim in first, Kaito believes he must seek out new strength. While Kota seeks out a new job and Mitsuzane wonders why the Suika Lockseed is no longer responsive, Mai finds an entrance to Helheim Forest. After failing to reach Kota, she decides to venture through the portal to find Yuya. She is soon attacked by Inves, but Mai is saved by Baron. Kaito reveals that he is in the forest looking for new Lockseeds, and Mai decides to tell him about the portal she found, but they soon find it is gone. Kaito winces in pain, revealing a wound that Mai tries to dress up. Kaito tells Mai that his need for strength is the result of his family losing everything when the Yggdrasill Corporation redeveloped Zawame. Mai tells Kaito that she understands, as her family suffered as well, but explains that her definition of strength is that of giving happiness. Though Kaito denounces her ideals of strength, he allows her to follow him to find a new way out. Meanwhile, upon learning of Mai's venture into the forest, Kota goes after her on the Sakura Hurricane while Mitsuzane learns that Sid is at Team Gaim's garage. He ushers the others out of the garage when Sid reveals he is looking for information on the Suika Lockseed. Mitsuzane admits that he stole it from his brother, but he reminds Sid that he is also a Kureshima, and makes a request of the Lock Dealer. In the Helheim Forest, Gaim wakes up after he was knocked out after falling off a cliff upon his entrance into the forest. He wanders around, looking for Mai, until he is ambushed by several Inves. He is at a disadvantage until Ryugen arrives on his own personal Rose Attacker. Once the Inves are defeated, Gaim reveals to Ryugen that the Helheim Forest is where the Lockseeds come from, prompting Ryugen to pick one off of a tree, transforming it into the Kiwi Lockseed. Elsewhere, Kaito and Mai find a portal back to Zawame, but they discover the Azure Dragon Inves nearby. Baron transforms to fight, but finds his weapon cannot harm the Inves. Gaim and Ryugen arrive to back him up, with Ryugen getting Mai through the portal to safety. Gaim and Baron battle the Azure Dragon Inves and all three enter Zawame. When Gaim realizes Orange Arms is ineffective against the Inves, he switches to Pine Arms and successfully uses the Pine Iron to deal some damage to the Azure Dragon Inves. This gives Baron the idea to use the Mango Lockseed he acquired previously, transforming him into Mango Arms, now armed with the Mango Punisher morning star, which also seems effective. Together, the two Riders defeat the Azure Dragon Inves, with Kaito now pleased with his strength. When he leaves, Mitsuzane realizes that if portals to the Helheim Forest are appearing on their own, as Mai had found earlier, then that means that Inves are now passing through into their world, while elsewhere in Zawame an Inves has already begun attacking people.
9	"The Great "Inves Monster Capturing" Operation!"; Transliteration: "Kaibutsu Inbesu Hokaku Daisakusen!" (Japanese: 怪物インベス捕獲大作戦！)	Shojiro Nakazawa	Gen Urobuchi	December 8, 2013
With Mitsuzane confirming his worst fears with news of monster sightings, Kota resolves that the Beat Riders need to work together to stop the invading Inves. However, Team Baron, Kaito explains that none of the Beat Riders will help them. Later, Kota and Mai come to Bando's aid when he is attacked by a Bat Inves when it thought the fruit he was picking up was Lockseeds. As Mai takes Bando to safety, using the Ichigo Lockseed to get an advantage, Gaim fights the Bat Inves before it escapes. Later that night, seeing the Suika Lockseed has regained its function, Mitsuzane is confronted by Takatora who believes the item was stolen by a Beat Rider as he defends them while concealing his association with them. The next day, Team Gaim orchestrates a plan to search the city for the Inves. Scolded by Mai for scaring an old lady, Kota meets up with Mitsuzane in Drupers where they learn that the Inves can only fruit from Helheim Forest. Having an idea, Mitsuzane goes to Helheim Forest with Kota to secure a premature fruit by entrusting Kota with his Sengoku Driver so not to mature it. During the Riders' stakeout, the Bat Inves arrives and the Riders attack, with Ryugen placing a tracer on the monster before it escapes. The tracer leads Kota and Mitsuzane to a factory where they find Helheim plants before being attacked by the Bat Inves. Though they succeed in destroying the Bat Inves, they find more Inves have entered their world and witnesses them being destroyed by the white Kamen Rider that almost killed Kota. Seeing the white Rider's supporters burning the plants away, Mitsuzane realizes they are concealing for realizing the white Rider is his brother before he and Kota are forced to flee when the fire starts consuming the factory without being spotted safely. At Yggdrasill, meeting with Ryoma to discuss the increase of portals, Takatora offers to test one of the new belt models to secure humanity's future.
10	"All the Riders Gather! Revealing the Forest's Mystery!"; Transliteration: "Raidā Daishūketsu! Mori no Nazo o Abake!" (Japanese: ライダー大集結！森の謎を暴け！)	Takayuki Shibasaki	Gen Urobuchi; Gun Snark	December 15, 2013
With the Inves attacks increasing, Kota and Mitsuzane decide that getting answers from the men in the hazard suits would solve the mystery of the forest, but only once they deal with the white Kamen Rider who is protecting them. Mitsuzane then comes up with an idea to hold off the white Rider so Kota can reach them, tricking Kaito, Hase and Jonouchi to help by starting a game where the Rider with the most Lockseeds wins. To give Hase and Jonouchi access to the forest, Mitsuzane convinces Sid to provide them some Lockvehicles. Sid, knowing it would undermine Takatora, accepts the proposal but explains that he will have the Lockvehicles ready by Christmas. When Mai learns of this, furious that the two are endangering Team Gaim's rank, Mitsuzane explains the game is set up so they can Yuya while he and Kota promise to be back by the Christmas party. While setting up the plan, Kota tells Mitsuzane to be careful as the white Rider is on a different level of skill. On the day of the game, after seeing his brother, Mitsuzane meets up with the Riders and is forced to let Oren join before they are ambushed by an army of Inves. After watching Baron leave for Helheim Forest, Mitsuzane transforms as the other Riders leave for the dimension while Kurokage and Gridon feed a Himawari Lockseed to an Inves to hold off Ryugen. Using the Kiwi Lockseed, Ryugen transforms into Kiwi Arms to improve his odds against the Inves as Gaim joins the fray to cover his friend in the Suika Arms before following as well. At the Yggdrasill building, upon learning of the Riders entering Helheim Forest, Takatora transforms into the white Kamen Rider before entering the maintained portal to Helheim Forest.
11	"The Truth Behind the Christmas Game"; Transliteration: "Kurisumasu Gēmu no Shinjitsu" (Japanese: クリスマスゲームの真実)	Takayuki Shibasaki	Gen Urobuchi; Nobuhiro Mouri	December 22, 2013
Having transformed into the white Rider, Kamen Rider Zangetsu, Takatora is given the task to drive out the other Riders. As the Lockseed gathering "game" begins, Baron and Bravo fight between themselves while Ryugen decides to look for the white Rider. Having arrived, Kota finds Zangetsu defeating Gridon and follows Zangetsu's supporters to a camp site surrounding a dimensional portal that is referred to as a crack. Posing as a researcher, watching Zangetsu defeat Baron and an awe-inspired Bravo, Kota learns of Helheim Forest's name and that Yggdrasill have been using the Inves Game and the Riders for testing. Furious about learning this, Kota sees Ryugen facing Zangetsu before he transforms to hold off the horde of Inves that are attacking the camp. At a same time when he is about to defeat Ryugen, Zangetsu receives a call of the Inves attack and finds himself forced to destroy Kurokage's Sengoku Driver when the Rider bars his way. Ryugen learns that Zangetsu really is his brother when overhearing him trying to contact the campsite. Being alerted to the chain of events, Ryoma orders the building's hologram system to be activated as the Inves begin to surge into the world. Luckily, finding a Suika Lockseed, Gaim transforms into Suika Arms and takes out invading Inves with Ryoma's help. While Takatora is disgusted by the turn of events, Ryugen found a box of Lockseeds in the camp ruins that makes Team Gaim the winners of the Lockseed hunting game. Later, as he and Mitsuzane arrive to Drupers to give Sid the Lockseeds, Kota tells Sid that they are not anyone's pawns. During a Christmas performance by Team Gaim, Kota thinks of all the events that have occurred since becoming an Kamen Rider and of the events that are to come.
12	"The New Generation Rider Appears!"; Transliteration: "Shin Sedai Raidā Tōjō!" (Japanese: 新世代ライダー登場！)	Hidenori Ishida	Gen Urobuchi	January 5, 2014
After reviewing what they have learned of the Yggdrasill Corporation using them and the other Riders, Kota and Mitsuzane choose not to transform for a while. However, an Inves attack forces Kota to transform in order to protect a group of girls from the Inves before he and Mitsuzane observe Yggdrasill's new security forcing the Kurokage Troopers to destroy all traces of Helheim Forest's flora after the nearby crack closes. Believing Zangetsu might try to silence anyone who knows about the Yggdrasill Corporation's secrets, Mitsuzane convinces Kota not to tell anyone of what they have learned until they know more of the company's intentions. Although Mitsuzane also attempts to convince him to discard his Sengoku Driver so as not to play in the company's hand, Kota refuses, as he believes that it is the only means to fight the Inves. After watching Gaim defeat a group of high-class Inves, Mitsuzane becomes conflicted. Elsewhere, Mai finds Kaito at a place where the Takatsukasa family shrine once stood before the Yggdrasill Corporation tore it and the surrounding forest down. She reveals to Kaito that she was the shrine maiden and tells him of her ideals, but he scoffs at them and leaves. Right after, Mai encounters the mysterious girl who tells her to forget about Kota and Kaito and leave the city while she is still in control of her fate. After his defeat by Team Baron, Hase finds himself abandoned by his Wild Raid teammates. Jonouchi begins to work at the Charmant, hoping to align himself with Oren as Kamen Riders, but Oren is still too enamoured with Zangetsu. Meanwhile, at the Yggdrasill Corporation's hologram room, Takatora is satisfied with the final testing of his new Genesis Driver and Melon Energy Lockseed. As the perfected New Generation Rider Zangetsu Shin, Takatora tells Ryoma that the Beat Riders have now served their purpose.
13	"The Friendship Tag Team of Gaim and Baron!"; Transliteration: "Gaimu, Baron no Yūjō Taggu!" (Japanese: 鎧武、バロンの友情タッグ！)	Hidenori Ishida	Gen Urobuchi	January 12, 2014
While Kota is working on his paper, Akira alerts him of a mysterious infection tied to physical contact with the Inves. When he, Mai, and Mitsuzane go to the hospital to be tested at his sister's behest, Kota finds out that they and the other Beat Rider teams are being held responsible for bringing the Inves into reality. However, the resident doctor has the trio flee from the furious band of citizens and takes them to see the extent of the infected suffering from painful plant-like growths at areas of their bodies touched by the Inves. Meanwhile, after failing to Sid, Hase begins having hallucinations of being attacked by Inves and Kamen Riders before coming to the conclusion that he must regain his power. Elsewhere, Takatora, Ryoma, Sid, and DJ Sagara discuss ways to continue the plan despite the infections and how the Beat Riders no longer have a role to play in their scheme. Though DJ Sagara brings up the fact that the Beat Riders will not give up the Sengoku Drivers easily, Ryoma assures him that Takatora will handle that situation. Soon after, Takatora arrives at the Charmant to offer Oren a job as an enforcer to take out the other Kamen Riders. Elsewhere, Team Baron dances to a small audience when a group of angry city folk pelt them with rocks, angry about their part in infecting the others. Kaito transforms into Baron and summons several Inves to attempt to scare them off when Oren appears, transforming into Bravo to "protect" the others and to eliminate Baron from the ranks of the Kamen Riders, only managing to drive them back when Peko's arm is broken in the crossfire. The next day, after watching Oren's public announcement to re-educate the Riders, Mitsuzane fears that he will not be able to reveal the truth of the Yggdrasill Corporation's actions. Later, Kota intercepts an Azure Dragon Inves that has appeared in the industrial district, but he is ambushed by Bravo. Much to Gaim's luck, Kaito arrives to settle the score with Bravo as the two Riders team up to battle Bravo. Baron lends Gaim the Banana Lockseed, and Baron Mango Arms works with Gaim Banana Arms to drive Bravo off. Kota and Kaito then search for the Azure Dragon Inves, discovering that the dimensional tear it came through has begun spreading the Helheim Forest's plants into their reality. The Inves consumes one of the fruits, transforming into a massive serpentine creature, but before they can transform, Zangetsu Shin makes himself known and uses the Sonic Arrow and his Melon Energy Lockseed to easily dispatch the Inves. He soon turns his attention on Gaim and Baron, but they are interrupted by the sudden appearance of Hase, who in his delusions has decided the only way to regain his power is to eat one of the forest's fruits himself. As the three Riders watch in shock, Hase transforms into the Bixie Inves before their eyes.
14	"The Secret of Helheim's Fruits"; Transliteration: "Heruheimu no Kajitsu no Himitsu" (Japanese: ヘルヘイムの果実の秘密)	Satoshi Morota	Gen Urobuchi	January 19, 2014
Hase flees after transforming into the Bixie Inves and Gaim pursues him while Baron confronts Zangetsu Shin by himself. Refraining from killing a human, Kota corners Hase who barely returns to human form, although still under the fruit's effects and attacks Kota before escaping. Meanwhile, Zangetsu Shin defeats Baron and Kaito is captured by the Yggdrasill Corporation's Kurokage Troopers. Kota returns to Team Gaim's base and when Mai and the others ask him about what is happening, he claims that he cannot explain the situation at the moment and leaves to keep searching for Hase. The next day, Takatora returns home briefly and Mitsuzane hides himself inside his car to infiltrate the Yggdrasill Corporation's facility. Hase appears at Drupers, and after trying to eat the fruits there, he attacks Rica, but Rat gets hurt trying to protect her, and after Hase flees, he is taken to the hospital. Elsewhere, Mitsuzane witness a meeting between Sid and Takatora who discuss the mass production of the Genesis Drivers before they are informed of Hase's location and leave in a hurry. When Mitsuzane enters the room and searches the research files, he watches a video of Ryoma explaining how any organism that eats a Helheim Forest fruit has its DNA rewritten and is transformed into an Inves. In another video, Mitsuzane discovers, much to his horror, that Yuya Sumii ate a fruit and transformed into the White Tiger Inves that Gaim destroyed months ago. Meanwhile, Gaim tries to calm down Hase with no success until Zangetsu Shin appears, accompanied by three other New Generation Riders using Genesis Drivers. One of the other Riders, the New Generation Rider Sigurd, drives Gaim away from the Bixie Inves before destroying the Inves and reveals himself as Sid. Kota confronts Sid for killing a human being just before he is restrained and captured by Kurokage Troopers.
15	"The Man Who Developed the Belts"; Transliteration: "Beruto o Kaihatsu Shita Otoko" (Japanese: ベルトを開発した男)	Satoshi Morota	Gen Urobuchi	January 26, 2014
Kota and Kaito are taken to the Yggdrasill Corporation headquarters and brought before Ryoma Sengoku. With his bodyguard Yoko Minato keeping them in line, Ryoma explains that he is not in charge of overseeing their progress and that Hase died the moment he became an Inves. Despite another escape attempt, Ryoma reveals that the Lockseeds are a means to control the power of the Helheim Forest while not transforming into an Inves. He makes a proposition to Kota and Kaito to help him reach greater heights with his research. Meanwhile, Mai meets with the other Beat Riders in an attempt to end the Inves Games due to the damage they cause, but the other groups are not interested and part ways. In his holding cell, Kota is approached by DJ Sagara who reveals his role in the company. Knowing that Ryoma offered him a deal, and after hearing Kota's desire to protect people rather than want power, Sagara leaves him with a security card, an Energy Lemon Lockseed and a Genesis Driver's core device. Soon after, Kota is found by Mitsuzane as they then free Kaito before go after their belts. However, Mitsuzane's attempt to hide Yuya's fate from Kota triggers the security system, separating the group while they attempt to reach the Crack in the basement level. Upon reaching the Crack, Kota is intercepted by Sid as they engage in a conflict of morals before Kota transforms. However, using the Energy Cherry Lockseed, Sid becomes New Generation Rider Sigurd as they take their fight into Helheim Forest. Sigurd easily overpowers Gaim before until Baron arrives, attacking Sigurd on their motorcycles before escaping. Before Sigurd can go after them, New Generation Rider Marika, revealed to be Minato, stops him due to Ryoma's order to let Gaim and Baron escape so he may study them further. Meanwhile, after running into Kurokage Troopers on Dandeliners, Mitsuzane transforms into Ryugen as Takatora watches through the security cameras.
16	"A New Arms! Jimber Lemon Is Born!"; Transliteration: "Shin Āmuzu! Jinbā Remon Tanjō!" (Japanese: 新アームズ！ジンバーレモン誕生！)	Osamu Kaneda	Gen Urobuchi	February 2, 2014
Ryugen escapes from the Yggdrasill Corporation complex while Gaim and Baron evade their pursuers as well and return from the Helheim Forest. Later, Kota and Mitsuzane visit Rat in the hospital, happy that he is not infected by the Inves disease, and learn that Mai is trying to end the Inves Games. Meanwhile, Takatora confronts Sid over Mitsuzane becoming an Rider, the Lockseed Dealer feigning ignorance, and after he leaves, Ryoma reveals that while intrigued about how Kota and Kaito escaped, someone has stolen some of his equipment. Mai and Chucky walk through town, discussing how everything has changed since the start of the Inves games, when they hear an alarm go off and discover that a jewelry store has been robbed by an Inves. They follow the Inves and discover that Team Red Hot is controlling it. Sonomura reveals to them that the Beat Riders have begun jailbreaking their Lockseeds to use their Inves outside of the games and sends his Inves against them, but Kaito appears in the nick of time to rescue them. Meanwhile, Mitsuzane returns home to see Takatora in his room watching the video of Yuya's transformation. Mitsuzane confronts his brother, who commends him for choosing to follow his own path and decides to reveal all the truth to him. Back in the garage, Kota tries to figure out how to use the Lemon Energy Lockseed with the Sengoku Driver with no success, until Mai arrives to reveal what has happened to her. Kota confronts Sonomura about the robbery, but he simply offers an alliance between Team Gaim and Team Red Hot. Kota refuses, and Sonomura reveals that Sid had made him an offer to take back Kota's Sengoku Driver, and uses a jailbroken Mango Lockseed to summon a Lion Inves to attack him. During the fight, the Mango Lockseed begins to short out, causing the Lion Inves to go rogue, growing wings in the process. Gaim manages to save Sonomura from being killed by the Inves, before it escapes and starts attacking civilians. When the Lion Inves knocks the Rider Indicator off of Gaim's Sengoku Driver, Kota attempts to place the Genesis Core in the empty space, and successfully activates the Lemon Energy Lockseed in tandem with the Orange Lockseed, transforming him into Kamen Rider Gaim Jimber Lemon Arms, easily destroying the Lion Inves with the Sonic Arrow and energy from both Lockseeds. In Helheim Forest, Mitsuzane is horrified when he is shown by Takatora what he claims to be the forest's darkest secret, and he agrees to work with his brother to conceal it from the public. At Drupers, Kota thinks over everything that has changed, and Bando encourages him that change happens for a reason, until Rat arrives, now discharged from the hospital, much to his joy.
17	"The Peach Rider Marika Descends!"; Transliteration: "Momo no Raidā, Marika Kōrin!" (Japanese: 桃のライダー、マリカ光臨！)	Osamu Kaneda	Gen Urobuchi	February 9, 2014
After Takatora reveals the truth about Helheim Forest to him, Mitsuzane is tasked to recover Kota's Sengoku Driver by any means. Mitsuzane later finds Kota as he is having trouble getting a job due to his Beat Rider status and sees that talking his friend out of it will not work while confiding that he wants to protect his friendship with Kota and Mai. The next day, with Yoko Minato supporting him while using a voice altering device to hide his identity from all parties, Mitsuzane hires Oren and Jonouchi before calling Kota that he has kidnapped Akira and her safety depends on the Sengoku Driver brought to the industrial district. Once arriving to the location, Kota finds Oren and learns that "Akira" is actually Minato in disguise. Oren reveals that Akira is actually at the Charmant with Jonouchi who has been given orders to attack her if Kota refuses to surrender the belt. However, having sabotaged Jonouchi's Lockseed, Oren explains that he will instead take Kota's Sengoku Driver by force, as he does not feel such dirty tricks are correct. After watching Bravo get defeated by Gaim Jimber Lemon Arms, Minato chides Mitsuzane for his idea before using the Peach Energy Lockseed to become New Generation Rider Marika, telling Mitsuzane to show her where his true loyalties lie. Conflicted, and remembering his friendship with Kota, Mitsuzane transforms into Ryugen and shoots Marika, telling her to report to Ryoma that he will protect Kota. After meeting with Ryoma in private to help him convince his older brother that his action was the scientist's plan, Mitsuzane arranges things so he can continue being a Beat Rider with his friends a bit longer.
18	"Farewell Beat Riders"; Transliteration: "Saraba Bīto Raidāzu" (Japanese: さらばビートライダーズ)	Hidenori Ishida	Gen Urobuchi; Nobuhiro Mouri	February 16, 2014
The members of Team Gaim invite the members of other teams to perform an All Teams Dance Event in order to regain the public trust. However, all other teams refuse to participate given their hatred towards Team Baron, who do not attend the meeting. Mai then attempts to convince Kaito to join as well but fails to do so. After Mai leaves, Kaito decides to quit Team Baron as well, claiming that he has other objectives in mind, presenting his fellow dancer Zack with a Sengoku Driver before leaving. Kota then confronts Kaito and learns that he does that to have his teammates join the event as well. Meanwhile, Oren learns about the event from Jonouchi and starts making plans against it. Back at the Yggdrasill Corporation, Ryoma analyzes the results of Marika's fight with Gaim and decides to test his new invention as soon as possible. On the day of the event, only Teams Gaim and Baron appear and few spectators gather, thanks to Oren's campaign against it, but they decide to keep dancing nevertheless. This prompts Oren to sortie a group of Inves summoned by Jonouchi at them. Kota confronts Oren with Zack, who becomes the new Kamen Rider Knuckle Kurumi Arms. As news about the event is streamed live by DJ Sagara, all the remaining teams decide to join as well. When discovered by his teammates, Jonouchi is dragged to dance with them, too. Baron arrives to help Knuckle against the Inves while Gaim transforms into Jimber Lemon Arms to fight Bravo. The event becomes a success; the Inves are destroyed, Gaim defeats Bravo, and the Beat Riders' public reputation is restored. However, Kota is later approached by one of the New Generation Riders who challenges him to a duel.
19	"The Gift Secret Weapon"; Transliteration: "Okurareta Himitsu Heiki" (Japanese: 贈られた秘密兵器)	Hidenori Ishida	Gen Urobuchi; Nobuhiro Mouri	February 23, 2014
Despite using the Jimber Lemon Arms, Gaim is defeated by the mysterious Rider who also defeats Baron when he steps in to fight him. After the assailant leaves, Kaito decides to find a way to break into the Yggdrasill Corporation's headquarters in order to find out the truth behind their actions and Kota agrees to help him. Back at Team Gaim's clubhouse, the members of Teams Gaim and Baron celebrate that the joint event brought an end to the Inves Games, despite several dancers decided to quit because of it. Kota then leaves to meet Kaito at Drupers where Mitsuzane appears asking to join their plan to infiltrate the Yggdrasill Corporation's headquarters, and the three decide that while Mitsuzane acts as a distraction, Kaito and Kota will break into the complex by the Crack that links it to Helheim Forest. However, Mitsuzane reveals the plan to his brother, who has Sid waiting for them with several Kurokage Troopers riding Tulip Hopper Lockvehicles. Once being kicked out of the forest, Kota and Kaito are approached by DJ Sagara who presents Kota with a Tulip Hopper Lockvehicle. When questioned about his intentions, DJ Sagara claims that he just wants to figure out who the Helheim Forest will choose. Certain that Sid will not expect a second attack too soon, the duo attempts to break into the Yggdrasill Corporation's headquarters once more, and after defeating the Kurokage Troopers, Baron stays behind to confront Sigurd using Gaim's Suika Arms while Gaim pushes forward, just to be stopped by Zangetsu Shin. Baron passes by the crack to escape when the Lock Dealer strikes him from behind, driving Kaito into a corner until Ryoma appears to stop him. Meanwhile, Zangetsu Shin defeats Gaim Jimber Lemon Arms and when Kota claims that his actions are evil, Takatora makes an offer to reveal to him the meaning of true evil, to which he agrees.
20	"The End of the World, the Invasion Begins"; Transliteration: "Sekai no Owari Hajimaru Shinryaku" (Japanese: 世界のおわり はじまる侵略)	Satoshi Morota	Gen Urobuchi	March 2, 2014
Takatora guides Kota to an ancient city deep inside Helheim Forest, revealing that the place must be the home of an alien civilization that was destroyed when the forest's plants had spread through it, transforming all life into Inves after they ate the fruit. Meanwhile, Ryoma reveals this information to Kaito, as well, and adds that the Yggdrasill Corporation is just a front to cover their real purpose, which is to prevent the Helheim Forest from taking over the world. Kaito also discovers that the Yggdrasill Corporation is using the sacred tree from Mai's family's shrine to open a Crack into the Helheim Forest, much to his anger, and Ryoma reveals that the tree is not of this world, thus making it necessary for their goals. Elsewhere, Kamen Rider Knuckle defeats some Inves, but fails to protect some passerby from being infected, when Oren and Jonouchi appears to try to turn the public against him, just to be interrupted when more Inves appear. Back at Helheim Forest, Takatora claims that should Yggdrasill fail to stop the plants' invasion, they could at least buy around ten more years for mankind and only those capable to fight it must know the truth until the last moment in order to prevent further chaos in the world, but Kota disagrees. When more Inves appear to fight them, Zangetsu Shin defeats the monsters by himself, as Gaim is unsure about fighting them, knowing that they were once ordinary living beings. When Ryoma finishes his explanation, Kaito claims that instead of just protecting the weak, they should take advantage of the situation to ensure that only the strong survive, and Ryoma, Sid and Yoko all reveal that they have the same intent, despite the Yggdrasill Corporation's goals in mind, welcoming him among their ranks.
21	"Yggdrasill's Secret"; Transliteration: "Yugudorashiru no Himitsu" (Japanese: ユグドラシルの秘密)	Satoshi Morota	Gen Urobuchi	March 9, 2014
Still in shock at Takatora's revelations, Kota relays what he has learned from him to Mitsuzane, who pretends that he did not know about it beforehand. He says that they should follow Yggdrasill's plans and keep it a secret from the public, but Kota cannot shake the feeling that there is something more going on. After meeting his brother, Mitsuzane is informed that he only revealed to his friend about the forest, and nothing else about Yggdrasill's other plans, like the "Scalar System" or the "Project Ark", but Takatora later confides to Sid that he only told Kota anything to see how far the boy will go before breaking into despair. Meanwhile in the Helheim Forest, Kaito searches the ruins for clues about a strange figure in a picture given to him, and while confronting some Inves sent by said creature, Ryoma reveals to Yoko that he has given Kaito the task to keep him away for a while. However, Sid claims that Kota may eventually become a hindrance to their plans and asks for Ryoma's permission to finish him off. The professor then agrees, claiming that it would be a good occasion to test the limits of the Genesis Core. While having dinner with his sister, Kota asks her if she would like to know if the world would be about to end or rather spend her last moments without knowing, and she affirms that she would rather know the truth and face it head on. Later at Drupers, Kota tells his worries to Bando, who claims that he must be careful when someone asks him to keep a secret, because secrets can be a source of power for those who know it, and thus can be used for evil. Suddenly, Kota is informed that some human controlled Inves are stealing money and he, Zack, and Mitsuzane depart to stop them. The three Riders confront the criminals and while Kota runs after them, Ryugen and Knuckle stay behind to defeat their Inves and recover the money. However, Kota is stopped by Sid, who reveals himself as the man who sold the Lockseeds to the thugs and Kota decides to confront him. During their fight, Kamen Rider Sigurd overpowers Gaim and reveals that the Yggdrasill Corporation is willing to destroy the whole city in order to prevent the Helheim Forest from spreading into Earth if necessary by using the Scalar System, which is the large ring-like structure that orbits its headquarters. Now certain that Yggdrasill cannot be trusted at all, Kota transforms into Jimber Lemon Arms to turn the tables and pin Sigurd down, managing to get the Cherry Energy Lockseed. However, Ryugen appears in the nick of time to summon an Inves and distracts Gaim long enough for Sid to escape. Meanwhile, Kaito examines the picture and wonders about its meaning and where the strange figure is currently hiding.
22	"A Seventh of the Truth"; Transliteration: "Nana-bun-no-Ichi no Shinjitsu" (Japanese: 7分の1の真実)	Osamu Kaneda	Gen Urobuchi	March 16, 2014
Kota and Mitsuzane discuss what he learned from Sid about the Scalar System when Mai informs them that a Crack is opening in the middle of a bridge in plain sight. To prevent it from being revealed to the public, the bridge is isolated but certain that the Yggdrasill Corporation will incinerate the city should an Inves pass through it, Kota and Mitsuzane decide to stand guard on the other side of the Crack in Helheim Forest to ensure that will not happen. On their way to the Crack, the duo meets Kaito who refuses to assist them, despite knowing the situation, and finds that Ryoma and New Generation Rider Marika are already defending the Crack with a squad of Kurokage Troopers. Mitsuzane then claims that he must return to protect Mai and the others, leaving Kota to assist the Yggdrasill Corporation by himself, confronting the incoming Inves along with Marika as Gaim Jimber Cherry Arms. During the battle, Ryoma reveals that his research is almost complete, as for mankind to survive the invasion of Helheim Forest, the Sengoku Drivers must be mass produced and distributed to each one of them as part of the Project Ark initiative. However, they only have resources to assemble around one billion Drivers, and the rest of the human population must be put down before that happens. Meanwhile, Mitsuzane approaches Mai and the others and attracts them to one of Yggdrasill's underground shelters by deceiving them into believe that he has found a new free performance stage. Once the Crack is closed, Kota immediately breaks his alliance with Yoko and Ryoma and steals the Peach Energy Lockseed from her, fleeing to the Crack that leads to the Yggdrasill Corporation's headquarters. Upon discovering that Gaim has broken in, Takatora transforms into Zangetsu Shin to confront him. When Gaim, as Jimber Lemon Arms, accuses Zangetsu Shin of preparing a genocide, he claims that it is all for the sake of mankind's survival and just like him, he was already forced to kill others to survive. In that moment, Takatora stops fighting and reveals the truth about Yuya to Kota, who finds out that he unwillingly killed his own friend, falling to his knees in shock and despair.
23	"Now Let's Go! Kachidoki Arms!"; Transliteration: "Iza Shutsujin! Kachidoki Āmuzu!" (Japanese: いざ出陣！カチドキアームズ！)	Osamu Kaneda	Gen Urobuchi	March 23, 2014
Devastated upon learning the truth about Yuya, Kota loses all will to fight, and Mitsuzane suggests to him not to tell anything about it to their friends. Meanwhile, Ryoma discusses the mission he gave to Kaito with his allies, which is to get more information about the "Overlords", which are human intelligence Inves who have managed to evolve and adapt to the Helheim Forest, claiming that it is the path mankind should follow to avoid extinction. Kaito finally encounters and confronts the Overlord Inves he has been looking for, who attempts to introduce himself to Kaito as Dēmushu. Kota meets Mai in the place where they would have met with Yuya when he last contacted them, but he refrains from telling her the truth as Mitsuzane suggested. Back at Drupers, Kota has another vision of the mysterious girl who supports his decision to stop fighting. Soon after, DJ Sagara appears before him, claiming that instead of just sacrificing others, there are others who pursue their dreams by fighting their way without renouncing anything, just like Kaito, and he presents Kota with the Kachidoki Lockseed and a Tanpopo Lockseed. With his will renewed, Kota mounts the Dandeliner and launches an attack on the Yggdrasill Corporation headquarters. A team of Kurokage Troopers are dispatched to stop him, but there is little they can do to stop Gaim's new form, Kachidoki Arms, and are defeated by his varied attacks through the Hinawadaidai-DJ-ju. Takatora appears to confront him as Zangetsu Shin, but fails to stop Gaim from destroying the Scalar System. Gaim then flees, after declaring that with their contingency plan destroyed, the Yggdrasill Corporation has no option but to find a way to stop the Helheim Forest's invasion. The mysterious girl reprimands DJ Sagara for interfering with Kota's decision, but he points out that she also did the same, as in the end, all that matters is who will be the one to be chosen by the Helheim Forest. Enraged with the recent developments, Ryoma contacts Mitsuzane and instructs him to investigate Kota in order to find out who betrayed the Yggdrasill Corporation and is assisting him.
SP	"Ressha Sentai ToQger vs. Kamen Rider Gaim: Spring Break Combined Special"; Transliteration: "Ressha Sentai Tokkyūjā Tai Kamen Raidā Gaimu Haruyasumi Gattai Supesharu" (Japanese: 烈車戦隊トッキュウジャーＶＳ仮面ライダー鎧武 春休み合体スペシャル)	Shojiro Nakazawa	Nobuhiro Mouri	March 30, 2014
Continued from the Ressha Sentai ToQger episode list. At Kota's request, the ToQgers take Mai with them for her own safety, and make plans to keep her entertained. But Wagon ends up revealing the truth about the events to her and she sneaks out of the Ressha when it stops in another station in Zawame City. She is found and captured by Moguraroid who uses her as a hostage against the ToQgers. Upon learning about the situation, Kota blames himself for abandoning Mai while Mitsuzane manages to pinpoint Moguraroid's location with help from his brother. Meanwhile, Moguraroid digs another hole and finally succeeds with his plan to call for reinforcements. Outside the building, Kota and Mitsuzane make plans to rescue Mai when Kaito appears to help them. Baron and Ryugen create a commotion to draw Moguraroid's attention while Kota and Right sneak inside the building to save her. However the two come across another Moguraroid, revealing that the first had summoned his own twin to assist him. Nevertheless, Kota and Right succeed in rescuing Mai, and while the Riders confront one of the monsters, the ToQgers face the other one. Just as the ToQgers fight, another warrior introducing himself as Kamen Rider Fifteen appears and confronts them. Overpowered by their new foe, the ToQgers are saved with the sudden arrival of Kamen Riders 1, 2 and V3, who confront Fifteen while they finish the Moguraroid with the Renketsu Bazooka. As Fifteen flees, the Showa Riders also leave without assisting Gaim and the others, claiming that they do not intend to involve themselves with the Heisei Riders. After transforming into Mango and Kiwi Arms respectively, Baron and Ryugen defeat the Badan Empire soldiers while Gaim transforms into Kachidoki Arms and finishes off the other Moguraroid. As the ToQgers bid farewell to Kota and the others as they leave the city, Kamen Rider Fifteen appears elsewhere, claiming that the time for the world to be conquered by the Badan Empire is at hand.
24	"The New Formidable Overlords"; Transliteration: "Aratana Kyōteki Ōbārōdo" (Japanese: 新たな強敵オーバーロード)	Hidenori Ishida	Gen Urobuchi	April 6, 2014
Baron continues to attempt to defeat Dēmushu to no success, until Marika appears to rescue him. The two then retreat, watched from afar by the Overlord Redyue. Meanwhile, Kota tests the power of the Peach Energy Lockseed and transforms into Kamen Rider Gaim Jimber Peach Arms, learning that it bestows him the power of super-hearing. Hearing that Mitsuzane is approaching, Kota calls him and reveals his intentions to not trust the Yggdrasill Corporation at all, looking for his own way to stop the Helheim Forest after learning from DJ Sagara about the Overlords. Meanwhile in the forest, while Redyue studies a Japanese dictionary and starts learning the language, the Overlords are contacted by a mysterious man who warns them to be careful of the intruders. At the Yggdrasill Corporation headquarters, Mitsuzane reveals to Takatora and the others about DJ Sagara's betrayal. He also tells his brother what he has learned from Kota about the Overlords, but Takatora does not believe him at all. Now certain that Kota has become a hindrance to their plans, Ryoma orders Sid to dispose of him. Upon returning to the forest in search of the Overlords, Gaim transforms into Jimber Peach Arms to make use of its super-hearing to track them down when New Generation Rider Sigurd appears to attack him. Using his own special Sid Lockseed, Sigurd summons three Suika Arms to fight Gaim, who fights back by transforming into Kachidoki Arms, easily defeating them. After fleeing from Sigurd as Jimber Cherry Arms, Gaim turns back into Jimber Peach Arms to keep looking for the Overlords, when Dēmushu and Redyue appear and attack him. He tries to tell them that he just wants to talk, dissuading them from fighting, but they defeat him as Redyue is able to produce loud sounds, using Gaim's super-hearing against him. Redyue, now having some domain of the Japanese language, reveals that she and her companion view the Kamen Riders as nothing more than toys to play with and the two then flee.
25	"Gridon and Bravo's Strongest Tag Team"; Transliteration: "Guridon Burābo Saikyō Taggu" (Japanese: グリドン・ブラーボ最強タッグ)	Hidenori Ishida	Gen Urobuchi; Jin Haganeya	April 13, 2014
Gaim, Knuckle, and Ryugen confront a large number of Inves at the same time, and after defeating them, they point out that the number of Cracks has increased recently. Jonouchi watches the scene from afar and overhearing one of his former team mates talking with Mai, he realizes that she thinks too little of him, much to his dismay. Once Oren realizes his worries, he decides to put him on a strange, but harsh, training routine to toughen him up. Meanwhile, Ryoma, Yoko, and Sid discuss the fact that their investigation on DJ Sagara has been fruitless, as no further information about him has been uncovered, when Sagara himself appears before them. When questioned about the help he has provided to Kota, Sagara claims that he acted to level up the competition. While Ryoma confirms that the Project Ark is only an excuse for him to have access to the Yggdrasill Corporation's resources, Sagara confirms Ryoma's theory that Helheim Forest has appeared on Earth past occasions, revealing that when it happens, a person is chosen to determine the fate of mankind once claiming the "Golden Apple", leaving after hinting that the Overlords are the key to obtain it. Back in Helheim Forest, Kota attempts to make contact with the Overlords again when Kaito appears and belittles Kota's efforts to reason with them, claiming that the Overlords will only listen to their requests once defeated by them. At Charmont, Oren has Jonouchi perform a drag show in order to make him more confident, but he is only horrified when the girls all come into the bakery and see him in drag. Ashamed, he flees to Drupers (in the middle of their strawberry special), where he meets Kota and confides to him that he lacks a direction to follow in life once the Inves Games were called off. However, Oren arrives, believing Kota is misleading his disciple. He transforms and makes a mess of Drupers, only for Iyo to attack him, giving Kota time to escape and transform. The two fight until several Inves appear to attack them, and Gaim Kachidoki Arms and Bravo fight back when Jonouchi decides to join the fight as well, transforming into Kamen Rider Gridon, who is knocked down while protecting the others. Once the Inves are defeated, Oren compliments Jonouchi for finally showing his resolve as he carries him away and learns from him about the existence of the Cracks. Back at Drupers, Kota apologizes to Mai for hiding secrets from her, while Oren finds a Crack and passes through it to investigate the other side.
26	"Baron's Genesis Transformation!"; Transliteration: "Baron no Geneshisu Henshin!" (Japanese: バロンのゲネシス変身！)	Satoshi Morota	Gen Urobuchi; Jin Haganeya	April 20, 2014
While eavesdropping on Takatora reporting the progress of Project Ark to his superiors, Mitsuzane learns that his brother is willing to bear the sin of the mistakes and that he will one day be forced to make the decision to cull humanity. The next day, Mitsuzane is livid to learn that Kota has told Mai the truth of the Inves and Yggdrasill Corporation. When Mai tries to tell the public what she knows, Mitsuzane summons Inves to attack the rally, leaving the Kamen Riders to destroy the monsters. Mitsuzane gets upset with Kota for making Mai sad for revealing the truth to her before she slaps him in the face. At the lab, after reviewing the footage of the fight with Dēmushu, Ryoma considers Kaito no longer needed in his plans before Minato uncharacteristically suggests giving the teen another chance, just as Mitsuzane arrives with a proposition. Minato gives Kaito a Genesis Driver, and Zack confronts him over aligning himself with their enemy. Elsewhere, Mitsuzane has Kota come with him to Helheim Forest to track down the Overlords, using Gaim to direct Kaito to their location through Marika. To distract him, Ryugen takes a hit from Marika to get Gaim to fight her while Kaito finds the Overlords' base. Confronting the Overlords, Kaito uses the Genesis Driver and Lemon Energy Lockseed to transform into Baron Lemon Energy Arms, finally landing a blow on Dēmushu until Gaim arrives and disrupts the fight. Furious at being overpowered by Baron, Dēmushu only leaves when he is telepathically contacted by Redyue who tells him that their leader would not be pleased of the turn of events. Forced to watch Dēmushu fall back, Baron argues with Gaim with Ryugen taking advantage to snipe Kota from behind when he tries to transform into Kachidoki Arms.
27	"Time to Know the Truth"; Transliteration: "Shinjitsu o Shiru Toki" (Japanese: 真実を知る時)	Satoshi Morota	Gen Urobuchi	April 27, 2014
In Helheim Forest, after Baron drives off Ryugen for the cowardly attempt on his life, Kota finally regains consciousness and wanders around Helheim Forest before running into Oren as he is starving and almost ate a Helhiem Fruit. Though he turns down a rice ball, Oren follows Kota to the Yggdrasill Corporation's Crack in hopes of seeing Zangetsu Shin. In the Yggdrasill Corporation Building, upon remembering how he suffered in testing the early prototype models of the Sengoku Driver, Takatora attempts to see if his company has the resources to save the enough of the human population before he and Ryoma are alerted to an Inves attack on the research camp. By the time Kota and Oren arrive, they find Zangetsu Shin and his Kurokage Troopers protecting the researchers from being attacked by an Inves Army led by Dēmushu in retaliation for the wound inflicted on him by Baron. As Bravo and the Kurokage Troopers protect the camp, Gaim tells Zangetsu Shin of the Overlords' existence and how they could solve the matter through peace talks as Dēmushu explains he has no intention to associate with humans other than slaughtering them. Working together to subdue Dēmushu, Gaim and Zangetsu Shin are overpowered by the Overlord until Bravo takes a hit meant for the latter. Before he can kill them, Dēmushu receives a painful psychic order from the Overlords' leader to return to the ruins. With their pawn seeing an alternative means to save all of humanity, and holding Sid at bay so Gaim can go after Dēmushu, Ryoma decides to eliminate Takatora.
28	"The Betrayal of Zangetsu"; Transliteration: "Uragiri no Zangetsu" (Japanese: 裏切りの斬月)	Takayuki Shibasaki	Gen Urobuchi; Jin Haganeya	May 4, 2014
After losing Dēmushu's trail, Kota returns to his friends and tells them that Takatora has sided with them with Mitsuzane hiding his displeasure. The next day, though his sister is fine that he does not have a job as he found something that makes him happy, Kota loses his résumés while he is forced to deal with an Inves attack. Despite the set backs, Bando gives him a job at Drupers . In Helheim Forest, as Dēmushu is being punished for attacking the outsiders, Mitsuzane attempts to kill Kaito to conceal his actions against Kota. Kaito explains that while they are enemies, he has no intent to tell Kota the truth. At the Yggdrasill Corporation, Takatora holds a meeting to discuss hunting down the Overlords for an alternative to Project Ark. After telling Mitsuzane how Kota has restored his hope for the future, the two of them along with Yoko and Sid depart for Helheim Forest in search for the Overlords. However, Zangetsu Shin is attacked by Sigurd and Marika as Ryoma arrives to keep him from escaping. Realizing that he has been betrayed by the conspirators, Takatora tells Mitsuzane to report the treachery and help Kota before he is knocked over a cliff. As Ryoma's group is confident that his older brother is done for, Mitsuzane takes Takatora's Genesis Driver and Melon Energy Lockseed for his own use. After learning that there is no one named Takatora working in Yggdrasill, Kota returns to Drupers to serve Kaito until he is tasked to make a delivery at a site where he is ambushed by Mitsuzane as Zangetsu Shin. With Kaito coming to his aid, Kota becomes Gaim Kachidoki Arms to stop the fight between Baron Lemon Energy Arms and Zangetsu Shin to find out what is wrong with the latter. Zangetsu Shin refuses to answer and summons a pack of Inves before escaping. Once the Inves are destroyed, Kaito tells Kota to stop trusting others so easily while leaving him with a warning to be careful of those he thinks are his friends. Back at the Yggdrasill Corporation headquarters, though believing that he would be unopposed in his goal, Ryoma finds that his laboratory has been destroyed by Sid. Telling Ryoma and Yoko that he only allied himself with them as they had a mutual enemy in Takatora, Sid explains he is going to obtain the Forbidden Fruit as he escapes through the now closing Crack in the sacred tree.
29	"The Overlord King"; Transliteration: "Ōbārōdo no Ō" (Japanese: オーバーロードの王)	Takayuki Shibasaki	Gen Urobuchi	May 11, 2014
Having survived the fall, the unconscious Takatora is approached by the Overlords' leader. Elsewhere, Kota learns that Mai is working in Drupers to help him out. Kota and Mitsuzane are contacted by Ryoma alongside Kaito. Since only they can reach Helheim Forest after Sid destroyed the artificial Crack, Ryoma asks the Kamen Riders for help tracking down Sid while revealing the Forbidden Fruit's existence to them. While discussing with the others, Mitsuzane receiving a text, Kaito leaves to search for Sid by himself on the excuse that Mitsuzane will eventually suggest for them to split up in search for him. Meanwhile, Takatora awakens and meets the Overlord who saved him, Roshuo, who lends him a Harvest Sengoku Driver Redyue found. Roshuo reveals that he was once the leader of the Femushinmu people who claimed the Forbidden Fruit after Helheim Forest consumed his world. However, Roshuo used it to create a society where the strong prey on the weak, leading to the downfall of their entire civilization. After deeming humans to be no different from the Femushinmu, Roshuo announces his intent not to give them the Forbidden Fruit so they would not suffer as he had. When Gaim and Ryugen get into the forest, Ryugen splits up from Gaim just as Kaito predicted and returns to the human world to meet Sid, telling him that he is not interested in the Forbidden Fruit as they form an alliance to take out Kota. Back in the forest, Gaim uses Jimber Peach Arms to track down Sid but instead hears Mitsuzane asking for help, claiming that he is being attacked by Zangetsu Shin. When Gaim comes to his help, Mitsuzane transforms into Zangetsu Shin and fights Gaim while Baron equips Lemon Energy Arms to fight Sid. At that time, refusing to accept Kaito's words, Gaim dons Jimber Lemon Armors to overwhelm Zangetsu Shin. However, Dēmushu appears to fight Gaim and Zangetsu Shin and upon being informed of this, Sigurd rushes to join the fight as well, followed by Baron. The all-out fight ends when a Crack appears and Dēmushu uses it to reach the human world.
30	"The Red and Blue Kikaider"; Transliteration: "Aka to Ao no Kikaidā" (Japanese: 赤と青のキカイダー)	Ryuta Tasaki	Nobuhiro Mouri	May 18, 2014
Two weeks prior to Dēmushu entering the human world, Kota and Mai come across a strange street performer that they later learn is an immobilized android. But once he is hit by lightning, the android regains mobility as Kota and Mai take him to the garage where they notice a Reboot button on his back. Upon learning that the android is named Jiro and has no memory, Kota decides to help him find his purpose. After convincing his sister to let Jiro stay them, Kota tries to help Jiro before fighting off a Goat Inves attacking people. Watching Gaim fight the Inves stirs feelings in Jiro as he drives the monster off, causing him to remember that there is someone he must protect but does not want to remember as he does not wish trouble. After being called by Zack, Kota finds Kamen Rider Knuckle fighting another android. After learning that Ryoma Sengoku has transplanted his brain into the android body of Hakaider, Gaim learns that Jiro is a battle android called Kikaider. After researching Dr. Komyoji and the mysterious events of his death, Kota tells Jiro of what he has learned while thinking that the Reboot button could restore his memory. But Jiro refuses to restore his memory out of fear that he may become a threat like Hakaider. Later while watching Gaim fight, Jiro is attacked by Sengoku-Hakaider. Once the fights mingle, Jiro decides to be Rebooted and transforms into Kikaider while Gaim equips Kachidoki Arms before they destroy the Inves after driving Sengoku-Hakaider off. Upon finding that Jiro no longer remembers him as the result of the Reboot, Kota sees the android off as he leaves to fulfill his programming. At that time, still horrified of the android's programming influencing him, Ryoma is curious of what purpose the brainless Haikaider serves for his colleague in the DARK organization.
31	"The Whereabouts of the Forbidden Fruit"; Transliteration: "Kindan no Kajitsu no Yukue" (Japanese: 禁断の果実のゆくえ)	Ryuta Tasaki	Gen Urobuchi	May 25, 2014
Roshuo continues to explain to Takatora the meaning of the Forbidden Fruit and how it gives its holder control over Helheim Forest, but says that humanity cannot possibly claim it. When Takatora demands to know more, DJ Sagara appears, revealing that it is unfair to one species to obtain two Forbidden Fruits and the Overlord confirms that he has the Fruit meant for mankind in his possession. DJ Sagara also confirms his suspicion that Roshuo intends to use the Fruits' powers to revive someone important to him, even at the cost of the lives of all those on Earth. Sagara convinces Roshuo to give humans a chance and he uses the power of the Forbidden Fruit to create a special key-like Lockseed and entrusts it to Sagara, who then leaves. Meanwhile, Dēmushu jumps into a Crack and Baron and Gaim pursue him to Zawame City, while Zangetsu Shin and Sigurd stay behind and come across Redyue. The Riders fight Redyue until she surrenders, claiming that she will show them the way to the Forbidden Fruit. Upon arriving on Earth, Dēmushu starts a rampage and Yoko is contacted by the mayor who claims that he will be unable to cover up such a high level of destruction from the public, when Ryoma, already transformed into New Generation Rider Duke, activates the Master Intelligent System to seize all communications in the city. He sends Marika, along with a squad of Kurokage Troopers, to subdue Dēmushu. Now certain that they cannot reason with the Overlord, Gaim and Baron confront him just to be defeated, with Kaito trapped in some debris and unable to reach the Genesis Driver. Enraged when Dēmushu claims that he is only attacking the city because it is the destiny of the weak to be crushed by the strong, Kota transforms into Gaim Kachidoki Arms and fights him on equal terms, until Marika and the Kurokage Troopers, with orders to take down Gaim first, attack him. In the confusion, Kaito's Genesis Driver is knocked closer to him and he reclaims it to transform into Baron Lemon Energy Arms, again, escaping with an injured Kota after he is defeated by Dēmushu due to Marika's interference. Meanwhile, Redyue guides Sid and Mitsuzane to the location of the Forbidden Fruit, but Mitsuzane decides to stay behind, claiming that only one of them can obtain it. When Sid moves onward, Mitsuzane confronts Redyue, certain that she was leading them into a trap and the Overlord confirms the boy's suspicions. Kaito takes Kota back to Team Gaim's garage where Kota asks Kaito if he truly shares Dēmushu's views on true strength, to which he agrees, but he also reveals that for that reason, he wants Kota to get stronger as well, and returns to the battle, accompanied by Zack. In Helheim Forest, Sigurd confronts Roshuo for the possession of the Forbidden Fruit, but is easily defeated by the Overlord, who destroys Sid's Genesis Driver and Cherry Energy Lockseed and crushes him to death between two rock walls. Back in Zawame City, Marika, upon seeing Kaito and Zack, asks for their help to subdue Dēmushu, but they refuse, saying they will fight her as well.
32	"The Strongest Power! Kiwami Arms"; Transliteration: "Saikyō no Chikara! Kiwami Āmuzu" (Japanese: 最強の力！極アームズ)	Hidenori Ishida	Gen Urobuchi	June 1, 2014
Baron Lemon Energy Arms and Knuckle confront Dēmushu with Marika watching as Kurokage Troopers intervene. Eventually, Dēmushu tires of its opponents and leaves. In Helheim Forest, after gaining Roshuo's permission to travel to Zawame with an army of Inves, Redyue informs Mitsuzane of Sid's death while revealing her own intention to conquer Earth and become its ruler. From there, Redyue reopens the Crack at the Yggdrasill Corporation headquarters to take over the building while her Inves army makes its way outside. Elsewhere, no longer able to conceal their activities from the public, the forces of the Yggdrasill Corporation make patrols around Zawame to find Dēmushu while incinerating any Inves that they encounter. Marika asks for backup from Ryoma, but he evacuates in a rocket from the headquarters as it is overrun by the Helheim vines, leaving her to rely on Zawame's remaining Beat Riders, Baron, Knuckle, Gridon, and Bravo, who join her in battle to drive off the Inves. Elsewhere, though in pain as he regains consciousness, Kota is still horrified by Dēmushu's ideals as Sagara appears to him and Mai. Sagara heals his injuries and explains to the livid youth that he never said that the Overlords would help them, and further explains that the only way to save his world is to become an Overlord himself. Sagara adds that Kota must be willing to kill off any rivals to obtain the Fruit of Knowledge. Against Mai's pleas, Kota agrees and Sagara reveals the Lockseed he previously obtained from Roshuo while freezing time. Sagara explains that he wants to ensure this power to a wild card, and Kota fights against the frozen time to take the Kiwami Lockseed to show he wants the means to the end. Once he manages to move himself to grab the Kiwami Lockseed, Sagara disappears and Kota and Mai are freed from his lock. Though the Beat Riders have had the advantage against the numerous Inves, they are defeated by Dēmushu after he surfaces from the sewers, having replenished itself on the Helheim fruits growing within them. Just as it is about to deliver a finishing blow on the group, Kota arrives and becomes Gaim Kachidoki Arms to fight Dēmushu before using the Kiwami Lockseed to combine all of the other armors to transform into Kamen Rider Gaim Kiwami Arms. Now able to use the weapons of all of the other Riders, Gaim overpowers Dēmushu before destroying the Overlord with apparent ease.
33	"The Great Beat Riders' Gathering!"; Transliteration: "Bīto Raidāzu Daishūketsu!" (Japanese: ビートライダーズ大集結！)	Hidenori Ishida	Gen Urobuchi; Norimitsu Kaihō	June 8, 2014
Kota looks for Akira at their apartment but she has already left to look for shelter. On the way, she finds a lost child and takes him with her to safety when a Lion Inves attacks. Meanwhile, the main leaders of the Yggdrasill Corporation argue between themselves about the latest developments until Ryoma contacts them. When the leaders refuse to comply with his plan to join forces in order to claim the Forbidden Fruit, Ryoma leaks to the public the truth about Project Ark, causing worldwide commotion. At Team Gaim's base, Kota and the other Riders discuss the situation looking for a solution, but Yoko explains that the JSDF have instructions to keep the Inves confined into Zawame City, and not to enter the town to confront them. The Riders then decide to split up and fight the Inves themselves, and Yoko distributes some communication devices to keep themselves in touch before they leave. At the Yggdrasill Tower, Redyue expresses her intent to have Mitsuzane rule over mankind as her proxy as the Overlord only wants to enjoy the powers of the Forbidden Fruit, but Mitsuzane reminds her that Kota is still a liability and Redyue instructs her subordinate Dyudyuonshu to assist him. Taking a break from the battle against the Inves, Kota and Mai pay a visit to Drupers, which is still open despite the current situation, where Bando makes some food for them. During the meal, Kota claims that he is not hungry due to the Sengoku Driver and he claims that the food tastes weird. Before he can explain further, Yoko calls him seeking assistance. Once Kota meets her, she asks him what he intends to do should he claim the Forbidden Fruit and warns him that to do so he must defeat all others who are fighting to obtain it, including Kaito. The two are then attacked by Dyudyuonshu and transform into Marika and Gaim Jimber Lemon Arms to confront it. Marika is defeated and Gaim pursues the Overlord, transforming into Kachidoki Arms, just to be ambushed by Zangetsu Shin. Still confused as to why Takatora is attacking him, Gaim only defends himself against Zangetsu Shin without fighting back until Bravo joins the fight and realizes that the Zangetsu Shin he is fighting is not Takatora at all. Now cleared of all doubts, Gaim transforms into Kiwami Arms and turns the tides of the battle, destroying Dyudyuonshu with an Ichigo Power charged blast from the Hinawadaidai-DJ-ju, which Zangetsu Shin avoids by using Dyudyuonshu as a shield. Exhausted after running away, Mitsuzane claims that no matter how much stronger Kota may become, he will eventually take advantage of his naïveté to defeat him for good.
34	"The King's Power and the Queen's Revival"; Transliteration: "Ō no Chikara to Ōhi Fukkatsu" (Japanese: 王の力と王妃復活)	Satoshi Morota	Gen Urobuchi; Jin Haganeya	June 22, 2014
The Beat Riders regroup at Team Gaim's base and discuss Oren's claim that there is someone posing as Zangetsu Shin before Mitsuzane appears, claiming to have been scouting Yggdrasill Tower. While Kaito still will not tell the truth about him to Kota and the others, Mitsuzane is confronted by Yoko as he admits to helping the Overlords while bribing her services with the Forbidden Fruit. But Yoko reveals she is more of a kingmaker and refuses to help him while unnerving him of how his treachery has left him homeless. Meanwhile, after studying Earth's technology, Redyue presents to Roshuo a means to revive his beloved and is given Gurinsha to support her idea. Returning to find Mitsuzane in a foul mood, Redyue sees that Mitsuzane has accepted her offer to be proxy as she reveals that Roshuo will give her the Forbidden Fruit because he cares only for his queen and nothing else. At Drupers, Kota and Kaito discuss the Forbidden Fruit before Redyue appears on TV, having used Yggdrasill's computer systems to hack all broadcasts worldwide, where she demands humanity to surrender and be her playthings or she will open multiple Cracks across the entire planet so it will be covered by Helheim Forest within one year. After the transmission, as Redyue tells a livid Mitsuzane that she has finished her machine, Kota and Kaito are found by Akira as she reveals that there are people still trapped in Zawame and are in danger. Meanwhile, having watched the transmission, an angry Zack runs off to the Yggdrasill Tower by himself, followed by Jonouchi and Oren before the group sees several Inves abducting people. The group transforms to defend the humans, with Knuckle giving Gridon the Suika Lockseed lent to him by Kaito to take out the numerous Inves. But as Gridon is unaware of how to operate the giant Arms, Bravo uses Gridon Suika Arms Ōdama Mode as a weapon with effective results. Meanwhile, guided by Akira to the shelter she has been staying in, Gaim and Baron Lemon Energy Arms fight a pack of Inves led by Gurinsha who are dragging people off. While fighting Gurinsha, Gaim watches Akira get kidnaped after he saves a boy from the Inves while fighting the Overlord. Needing to finish the fight, Gaim transforms into Kiwami Arms to overpower Gurinsha with Baron's help, but Redyue appears and absorbs the energy from Gaim's Kiwami Au Lait attack. She reveals that the kidnapped people are a power source for her machine and she discourages the two Riders from pursuing her as she reminds them of her declaration of war on the Earth. Within minutes, a barrage of strategic missiles are over Zawame City with the Overlord gloating that the city's people have been forsaken by the rest of the world. Back in the tower, Roshuo and Takatora have arrived just as the missiles are about to strike. Roshuo decides to aid Redyue by freezing the missiles in place and dissolving them into nothingness. Watching the scene from the tower, and seeing that humanity has no chance of defeating the Overlords, a hopeless Mitsuzane reaffirms his belief that aligning himself with the Overlords was his best choice.
35	"Mitchy's Ark"; Transliteration: "Mitchi no Hakobune" (Japanese: ミッチの箱舟)	Satoshi Morota	Gen Urobuchi	June 29, 2014
Having destroyed the missiles so Redyue can fulfill her promise, Roshuo allows Takatora to leave so he can fulfill his duty as humanity's leader to witness its demise. Once back in Helheim Forest, seeing that he was right about the humans, Roshuo decides to speed up their extinction by opening Cracks worldwide. With everything going according to plan, Redyue takes her leave while allowing Gurinsha to fight Gaim and Baron. Gaim destroys Gurinsha with a Pine Power charged blast from the Hinawadaidai-DJ-ju. Later, upon learning that the United States has been consumed by the massive Inves attack around the world, Kota decides to take the fight to the Overlords by breaking into the Yggdrasill Tower to save Akira and the other captives. Upon arriving at the tower with Kaito and Yoko, Kota's group finds that all entrances are guarded by Inves. Kota decides to get Mitsuzane's help to sneak in, including defending him when Kaito and Yoko attempt to have him realize that he is not on their side. However, the group is attacked by a Bat Inves and are forced to fight the Inves guarding the nearby entrance before falling back. Inside the tower, having met Akira while amongst the captives, Rika and Rat find themselves brought before Mitsuzane as he reveals he has made a deal with the Overlords to save them and many others. But what Mitsuzane does not tell them is that those that he has not saved, like Akira, will have their life force extracted by Redyue's machine to be transferred into the casket holding Roshuo's beloved. Later, Mitsuzane finds Mai as she is gathering supplies and attempts to win her over by offering her a place in the new human society. But after seeing that he is working with the Overlords, Mai refuses to accept his proposal, learning what Mitsuzane truly thinks about Kota while she explains to him that Kota still has hope. At the same time, Chucky and Rat attempt to break Akira free from the machine when Redyue appears to stop them. Outside Drupers, having followed him since watching him and the others attempt to break into the tower, Takatora decides to see Kota once Kaito and Yoko leave. However, Takatora sees Mitsuzane entering Drupers to lure Kota to a deserted area where he finally reveals his true colors as he transforms into Zangetsu Shin. With Takatora watching in horror, Mitsuzane reveals his intent to kill Kota so Mai would not be another victim of his "hope" like Yuya was. Though shocked, Kota transforms to defend himself.
36	"A Brotherly Conclusion! Zangetsu vs. Zangetsu Shin!"; Transliteration: "Kyōdai no Ketchaku! Zangetsu VS Zangetsu Shin!" (Japanese: 兄弟の決着！斬月VS斬月・真！)	Takayuki Shibasaki	Gen Urobuchi	July 6, 2014
Having driven Kota into corner after revealing himself to be the new Zangetsu Shin, Mitsuzane prepares to kill him when Takatora intervenes to plead to his brother not to kill Kota. Mitsuzane refuses to listen as he warns Takatora not to interfere. Kaito arrives to fend off Redyue before having his arm injured by her. Redyue then spirits Mitsuzane away, telling him from personal experience that the best joy comes from killing those who trusted her like she did with her own parents. At Team Gaim's garage, though the others are furious at the turn of events, Kota and Mai still see Mitsuzane as a friend, with Kota intending to learn the full truth of the matter. Outside Team Gaim's garage, Takatora learns of Ryoma's actions from Yoko as he accepts having her fight by his side while seeing Mitsuzane as an enemy now. The next day, having concealed the severity of his injury from Redyue, Kaito tries to convince Mai that Mitsuzane is their enemy but respects her resolve to find a way to help him. Takatora heads to Drupers to talk to Kota, telling him of how he raised Mitsuzane while their parents were away and tried to be a good example. Though Kota tells him that he thinks Mitsuzane took the lessons to heart, he has taken a dark path due to his own hardships. Takatora believes he is at fault and sends a message to his brother while retrieving his Sengoku Driver and Melon Lockseed. The next day, the Beat Riders have finished evacuating all of the remaining citizens save those still held captive at the Yggdrasill Tower. While out looking for Takatora, Kota learns from Yoko that he is going to fight Mitsuzane. Though advised not to meddle in the brothers' fight, Kota goes after them nonetheless before being hindered by Redyue and fighting her as Gaim Kachidoki Arms. Furious upon learning Redyue's intention to use Mitsuzane until he breaks from realizing that all of his efforts will come to naught, Gaim equips Kiwami Arms to overwhelm the Overlord. With none of her attacks working against Gaim, Redyue retreats after almost being hit by an Orange Power charged blast from the Hinawadaidai-DJ-ju. Before she leaves, she warns Kota that he will know the price of his power soon enough. As their duel has already started, Zangetsu gets the upper hand but is unable to land the death blow with Zangetsu Shin taking advantage with a powerful slash that knocks his older brother into the river as his Sengoku Driver falls into a nearby bush.
37	"Baron Soccer Showdown: Summer Camp!"; Transliteration: "Baron Sakkā Taiketsu Natsu no Jin!" (Japanese: バロン・サッカー対決 夏の陣！)	Takayuki Shibasaki	Nobuhiro Mouri	July 13, 2014
Kota keeps searching after Mitsuzane and Takatora, when he is attacked by a mysterious monster that can split itself into a swarm of insects. He successfully drives it away after transforming into Gaim Jimber Lemon Arms. Kaito, still suffering from Redyue's wound, is approached by DJ Sagara who comments on how he has been surpassed by Kota, which Kaito refuses to admit. Sagara then opens a Crack to an alternate world from which another Kamen Rider Gaim emerges and transforms into Kachidoki Arms, while Kaito transforms into Baron Lemon Energy Arms to confront it. During the fight, Kaito sees an unfamiliar boy from afar before he is hit by a blast from the Hinawadaidai-DJ-ju. He is knocked into a soccer stadium in an alternate reality, where he finds Zack and Peco playing as part of the soccer team "Team Baron" against Oren, Jonouchi, and Hase's "Team Charmant". After Team Baron suffers a crushing defeat from Team Charmant, Kaito, claiming that he has lost his memory, asks his friends for an explanation. They tell him that in this world, the invasion from Helheim Forest never happened and the Riders are training to compete in the "All Rider Cup" soccer championship for the right to possess the "Golden Fruit". Kaito then starts training with the others, until they are approached by famous soccer player Kengo Nakamura who joins them while helping them to perfect their skills. Some time later, while training by himself, Kaito is approached by the same boy he had seen earlier, who sends the monster that fought Gaim to fight him as well. After forcing the monster to retreat as Baron, Kaito and his team confront Team Charmant, who brings another soccer star, Kosuke Ota as ringer, in the first match of the "All Rider Cup". However, during the match, an army of Inves attacks and both the Riders and the soccer stars join forces against the monsters. Elsewhere, Kota is attacked by the monster once again and transforms into Kachidoki Arms, then Kiwami Arms to destroy it. After defeating the Inves, Kaito awakens back in his own world, wondering if everything he had just experienced was a dream, while Kota keeps searching after the Kureshima brothers, unaware that a mysterious Kamen Rider is watching him from afar.
38	"Return of the Professor"; Transliteration: "Purofessā no Kikan" (Japanese: プロフェッサーの帰還)	Kyohei Yamaguchi	Gen Urobuchi; Jin Haganeya	July 20, 2014
Kota arrives too late to stop Mitsuzane and Takatora's fight and all he finds is Takatora's destroyed Sengoku Driver and Melon Lockseed. Meanwhile, Mitsuzane claims to Redyue that he is happy for finally overcoming his brother, but then he starts seeing hallucinations of his brother, much to his anger. Upon returning home, Kota relays the news to Mai and reaffirms his will to not abandon Mitsuzane and look for a way to have him come to reason, when Ryoma appears before them, rejoicing upon hearing about Takatora's fate. An angry Kota then transforms into Gaim to confront him, later assisted by Knuckle. Duke holds himself against Knuckle and Gaim Jimber Lemon Arms until Baron joins the fight, and the outnumbered Ryoma calls for a truce, claiming that he has an offer to them. Knowing that Kota and the others intend to rescue the citizens held captive at Yggdrasill Tower, Ryoma claims that he knows of a secret entrance and asks the others to join his plan to infiltrate it. Meanwhile at Helheim Forest, Redyue confronts Roshuo for entrusting the humans with a part of the Forbidden Fruit's power, leading to the deaths of Dēmushu and the others, but the Overlord King replies that despite being almost certain that humanity is doomed, he needs to see it there is still some hope for them at all. While discussing about Ryoma's proposal, Kota and Kaito are approached by Mai and Kaito agrees with their resolve to not give up on Mitsuzane yet. However, while making some shopping with Peco, Mai is approached by Mitsuzane, accompanied by the Overlord Shinmugurun who attacks Peco and she agrees to come with him once they agree to spare him. Peco then contacts Kota and Kaito who run after them. Kota then attempts to dissuade Mitsuzane once more but fails and is forced to transform to fight him. Surprisingly, Gaim is overpowered by Zangetsu Shin even after transforming into Kachidoki Arms, but just as Gaim is about to be finished, Zangetsu Shin has another vision of Takatora, allowing Baron Lemon Energy Arms to arrive in time to save Gaim, who transforms into Kiwami Arms to fight back, but when Zangetsu Shin has another vision of Takatora, he shoots from it instead, forcing Baron to take Gaim and retreat. Kota still wants to rescue Mai, but Kaito claims that unlike him, Mitsuzane had cast away all his doubts, fears and hesitation, and he won't be able to defeat him unless he also does so.
39	"The Suicide Plan to Break Into Tower!"; Transliteration: "Kesshi no Tawā Totsunyū Sakusen!" (Japanese: 決死のタワー突入作戦！)	Kyohei Yamaguchi	Gen Urobuchi	July 27, 2014
After considering their options, Kota and the other Riders decide to accept Ryoma's offer for help in breaking into Yggdrasill Tower to save Mai and the other captives. Meanwhile, Mai attempts to dissuade Mitsuzane once more without success and becomes shocked upon seeing him hallucinate an argument with Takatora. Kota and the others take a truck to Ryoma's secret passage, which is located in the outskirts of Zawame City while Redyue suggests to Mitsuzane that he should use Mai in order to defeat Kota once and for all, but he gets angry at the Overlord for doing so. The truck taking the Riders to the tower is attacked by Inves, and Gridon and Bravo decide to stay behind to make way for the others to proceed. In Helheim Forest, Mitsuzane entrusts Mai to Roshuo's care, claiming that he cannot trust Redyue at all and that he wants the Overlord King to realize mankind's worth by knowing her better. Once reaching the entrance to the secret passage, Ryoma provokes Kota for abandoning Oren and Jonouchi for them to push forward, but Kaito punches him in the face for his insolence instead. While Mai attempts to reason with Roshuo, Kota and the others are attacked by the security system composed of several automated Suika Arms and Tuliphoppers which Ryoma claims that it can only be shut down from the inside. To allow Kota and Ryoma get through, Baron, Knuckle and Marika confront the security system on their own. However, once the two enter into an area infested with Helheim Plants, Redyue is alerted and sends Shinmugurun to attack them. Duke confronts the monster with his tuned up Genesis Driver but leaves it to be destroyed by Gaim instead, which he does so with an Orange Power charged blast from Kiwami Arms' Hinawadaidai-DJ-ju, unaware that his power is being analyzed by Ryoma for his own purposes instead.
40	"The Overlord Awakens"; Transliteration: "Ōbārōdo e no Mezame" (Japanese: オーバーロードへの目覚め)	Hidenori Ishida	Gen Urobuchi	August 10, 2014
Kota and Ryoma reach the room where Akira and the others are having their energy siphoned and sent to the tomb of the Overlord Queen but before being able to do anything, Redyue appears to fight them. The fight leads them outside, where Redyue uses her hypnosis on Gaim and Duke takes advantage of her distraction to flee. Kota starts seeing a vision of the city, free of the Inves, but the inhabitants flee from him in fear and he realizes that he was transformed into an Inves as well. Much to his surprise, Yuya appears to fight him, transforming himself into Kamen Rider Gaim. Unwilling to fight his friend, Kota flees from him. Meanwhile, Kaito, Zack, and Yoko find the prisoners and after Kaito destroys the machine to release them, he runs ahead to help Kota, leaving the others to help Akira and the other captives to escape. In Helheim Forest, as Mai speaks to Roshuo, she is approached by Sagara who reveals that should Kota take possession of the Forbidden Fruit, he will be able to rule the world as he sees fit, but only after it is overrun by the Helheim Forest. Duke reaches the control room and restarts the Master Intelligent System, using it to access the footage of all events that occurred in the Tower during his absence. While searching for Kota, Kaito stumbles on Mitsuzane, and without Kota there to dissuade him, he decides to fight him to the death. Back in his visions, Kota attempts to reason with his friends at Drupers, but they are also in fear of him, and when Marika and Knuckle appear to fight him, two other Inves appear to rescue him. Kota then meets Redyue, who reveals that by choosing to obtain the power of an Overlord, he is not human anymore, thus is destined to be shunned by the rest of mankind. Yuya then appears to fight Kota again, just to be defeated by him. Meanwhile, Sagara affirms that Kota must choose between preventing the world's destruction or save himself, while Mai are certain that he had already made his choice. Yuya demands Kota to finish him, but he refuses, deciding that he will fight for mankind even if he is not human anymore. At this moment, Kota breaks from Redyue's trance and attacks her. Redyue then flees and vines from the Helheim Forest start growing around Kota, implying that his transformation into an Overlord is in an advanced stage, but shows no regrets because of it.
41	"A Duel with the Overlord King!"; Transliteration: "Gekitotsu! Ōbārōdo no Ō" (Japanese: 激突！オーバーロードの王)	Hidenori Ishida	Gen Urobuchi; Jin Haganeya	August 17, 2014
When Duke informs Kota and Kaito that Mai is under Roshuo's custody, they rush to the Helheim Forest to rescue her, while Bravo and Gridon appear to fight Mitsuzane in Kaito's place. Duke also leaves to the forest as well, where Roshuo laments that he has failed to save his race even after his wife entrusted the Forbidden Fruit to him, and Mai comforts him by affirming that her faith in him was not misplaced, as he did what he could. Roshuo then transfers the Golden Fruit to her body and sends back to the human world, just before Kaito and Kota appear to fight him. Meanwhile, Zangetsu Shin overpowers both Bravo and Gridon, who take an opportunity to flee, and Redyue mocks Mitsuzane, claiming that his plan of entrusting Mai to Roshuo may backfire on him should he take an interest in her. Transforming into Kachidoki and Lemon Energy Arms, Gaim and Baron are overpowered by Roshuo, and while Kaito becomes too weak to continue, Gaim transforms into Kiwami Arms to keep fighting the Overlord King, who destroys the Kachidoki Lockseed and defeats Kota, but recognizes his efforts, with Duke watching all the battle from the sidelines. However, Redyue takes an advantage of Roshuo's distraction to attack him from behind and kill him, but is distraught upon learning that he does not possess the Forbidden Fruit anymore. Enraged for her acts of treason, Kota's Overlord powers emerge, allowing him to restore the Kachidoki Lockseed and transform into Kiwami Arms, again. Mastering the power to control the forest to his favor, Gaim destroys Redyue once and for all with an Orange Power charged blast from the Hinawadaidai-DJ-ju, and upon realizing that the Golden Fruit is with Mai, Kaito, Kota, Mitsuzane, and Ryoma rush back to Zawame City. Sagara then pays his respects to the spirit of the deceased queen, who appears to reunite with her husband in the afterlife.
42	"Mitsuzane's Last Transformation!"; Transliteration: "Mitsuzane! Saigo no Henshin!" (Japanese: 光実！最後の変身！)	Satoshi Morota	Gen Urobuchi; Jin Haganeya	August 24, 2014
Kota and the others tend to the survivors when some Inves attack them, forcing and Gaim and Baron to fight back. Meanwhile, Mitsuzane finds Mai at Team Gaim's base and she passes out. Ryoma appears soon after, and upon realizing that Mai is carrying the Golden Fruit in her body, decides to take her to a hospital. After defeating the Inves, Kota and Kaito have a serious discussion when Kaito wonders if mankind should evolve under Helheim Forest and he leaves, with Yoko following him. While Kota keeps searching for Mai, Chucky and Rat help move Mai to an abandoned hospital where they are deceived and locked up by Mitsuzane and Ryoma, who flee with Mai somewhere else. Kaito winces in pain, and reveals to Yoko that a wound he had previously received from Redyue is beginning to mutate him, but he constantly wears the Genesis Driver to keep it at bay. Yoko resolves to stay by his side to the end. When Ryoma and Mitsuzane examine Mai's body, trying to find a way to remove the Golden Fruit without killing her, Sagara appears to them, and claims that it will only leave her body when she bestows it to a champion chosen by her. He further reveals that he is actually the will of the Helheim Forest himself, who travels across worlds to hasten the evolution of their lifeforms. After Sagara leaves, Ryoma convinces Mitsuzane to fight Kota to prevent him from claiming the Golden Fruit, and to do so, he entrusts him the Yomotsuheguri Lockseed, claiming that he will take care of Mai in his absence. While Rat and Chucky escape from the hospital through the window, Mitsuzane finds Kota and uses his new Lockseed to transform into Kamen Rider Ryugen Yomi to fight him, despite being warned that the transformation may cost his life. Unable to dissuade him, Gaim transforms into Kachidoki Arms, then Kiwami Arms to fight back.
43	"Baron's Ultimate Transformation"; Transliteration: "Baron Kyūkyoku no Henshin" (Japanese: バロン 究極の変身)	Satoshi Morota	Gen Urobuchi	August 31, 2014
Ryugen Yomi and Gaim Kiwami Arms continue their fight, as the Yomotsuheguri Lockseed continues to drain Mitsuzane's life away. Mai dreams of herself in Team Gaim's garage and is visited by DJ Sagara who tells her that she is in possession of the Golden Fruit and that she can use it to do anything based on her ideals. While Ryoma begins operating Mai, both Ryugen Yomi and Gaim initiate their finishing attacks, but as they are about to attack each other, Gaim throws his Musou Saber aside and reaches the Yomotsuheguri Lockseed to remove it from Ryugen Yomi at the cost of his own life. Surprised by his former friend's action, Mitsuzane asks Kota why, and Kota tells him that he has already forgiven his actions and advises him to forgive himself before Kota seemingly dies. Mitsuzane realizes he still has more time left and seeks out Mai. Rat and Rica arrive at the Team Gaim garage, spreading the bad news to Kaito and Yoko about Mai. Upon entering the hospital where Mai's operation took place, Ryoma reports that the operation was a success and he is delighted to hear of Mitsuzane's progress. As Mitsuzane checks on Mai, he realizes that she has died during the operation, as Ryoma never intended to save her but only to take the Golden Fruit away since it had completely fused with her heart. Angered that all of his efforts were in vain, Mitsuzane tries to transform into Zangetsu Shin but Ryoma quickly disables the Genesis Driver with a kill switch, knowing that he would someday duel with another user of his creations, before beating up Mitsuzane while comparing his foolishness to his brother's. The Golden Fruit soon erupts and transforms into a spectral Mai who forgives Mitsuzane for his past actions and disappears before Mitsuzane can reach through to her. Mai travels back in time while DJ Sagara calls her actions crazy, and impossible. Mai arrives at the point in time where Gaim's debut as Kachidoki Arms in his battle against Kurokage Troopers on the Yggdrasill Tower and meets the past DJ Sagara, asking why he has encouraged Kota. Sagara replies that this is all a plan to see who is worth obtaining the Golden Fruit. As Kaito and Yoko arrive too late, they discover a crying Mitsuzane beside Mai's corpse and a crazed Ryoma Sengoku trying to calculate the current location of the Golden Fruit. Disgusted over the professor's actions, they try to transform but Ryoma quickly disables their Genesis Drivers, as well. However, Kaito still possesses his Sengoku Driver and battles New Generation Rider Duke as Kamen Rider Baron, struggling throughout the fight with the Helheim infection. As Ryoma mocks him for the infection, Kaito remembers the pains he has gone through all his life and decides to eat a Helheim Fruit, remarking on how it affected Hase, transforming himself into an Overlord Inves called Lord Baron. Surprised by Lord Baron's ability to retain his mental capacity, Ryoma quickly transforms and fights him but he is quickly overpowered by the Overlord's immense power. Ryoma warns Kaito of the danger for abandoning his humanity before falling to his death. Still, Kaito refuses to surrender and keeps heading to his fate while Yoko picks up Ryoma's discarded Genesis Driver.
44	"The Future Goals of Two People"; Transliteration: "Futari no Mezasu Mirai wa" (Japanese: 二人の目指す未来は)	Osamu Kaneda	Gen Urobuchi; Jin Haganeya	September 7, 2014
Chucky and Peko rush to the warehouse that Gaim and Ryugen Yomi's fight has taken place and discover a heavily injured Kota and escort him to safety. Mai gets herself lost in temporal pathways and witnesses the battle between four factions: Gaim, Baron, and the Kureshima brothers. As Sagara has told her, all four Riders here have the potential to claim the Golden Fruit. These potentials affect none to the future, except being shadows of the past. Moments later in the hospital, Kaito, Yoko, and Mitsuzane watch Mai's corpse fade away. DJ Sagara appears to them, revealing that Mai is not dead but she is no longer a human. As Mai is trapped in a parallel reality, she has already gone to the past and warned the Riders (Kota, Kaito, and Mitsuzane) of their fates. Now as the Maiden of Fate, her role is to pass the Golden Fruit on to the champion. Still in despair, Mitsuzane declines his participation, as the girl he loved is no longer be a human, but Kaito accepts the challenge and decides he will win. While Kota is bedridden from his injuries, Mai visits him in his dreams, expressing her regrets for not being able to change the future, but Kota stops her, holding to her previous words of never giving up had made him fight until the end. Mai suddenly remembers Kaito, who has a different view for the future unlike Kota and disappears before Kota can reach her. Taking shelter in a warehouse, Yoko feels relieved that she has picked the right future and reveals the reasons she has stayed by Kaito's side. The next day, Oren, Jonouchi, and Zack find Kaito and Minato but stop when they sense Kaito's scent is not like his old one. The power-drunk Kaito summons two Inves to his aid and transforms into Lord Baron with Minato to fight them. Zack finds himself conflicted between his loyalty and friendship. In the heat of battle, Zack seemingly makes his decision to aid Kaito by helping Yoko dispose of Gridon. As a result, Jonouchi and Oren's Lockseeds and Sengoku Drivers destroyed. Both of them retreat and reveal the horrible news to Kota and the others. Despite bearing heavy injuries, Kota rushes off to fight Kaito. Kaito reveals that to bring Mai back to the present and to rule the world, he must win the Golden Fruit challenge and defeat Kota. Both begin to battle as Kamen Riders, but just as it seems Kota will win the fight, Kaito transforms into Lord Baron again and attacks Kota. Having no choice, Kota utilizes Kiwami Arms and faces off against Lord Baron. In the middle of the battle, when Kota winces in pain, Zack transforms and seemingly overpowers Kota, but not before secretly telling him to retreat. Though exhausted, Kota still wonders what Zack is planning.
45	"The Final Battle of the Two Destined People!"; Transliteration: "Unmei no Futari Saishū Batoru!" (Japanese: 運命の二人 最終バトル！)	Osamu Kaneda	Gen Urobuchi	September 14, 2014
After Kota retreats, Zack manages to find Peko and he gives him a note to deliver it to Oren. In the Team Gaim garage, Kota reveals to his friends that he will become an Overlord, shocking everyone, while Oren receives the note from Peko. Elsewhere, Kaito has a vision of Mai and tells her that he will claim the Golden Fruit from her to create a new world. In Drupers, Zack meets up with Peko and the others as he receives a small device from Oren. He tells them that he will defeat Kaito by himself. Upon meeting up with Kaito and Yoko at the top of the building, Zack plants a bomb near Kaito and leaves without Kaito noticing. However, Yoko does notice something from Zack and she attempts to stop him from detonating the bomb. Zack manages to hit the trigger, setting off the explosion, but Yoko transforms and protects Kaito, throwing her off of the building. With Kaito unharmed, Zack transforms to fight him, but Kaito ultimately defeats him. In his last breaths, he warns Kaito that someone else will stop him as he loses consciousness. Kaito goes to see Yoko on the ground, and they speak before Yoko dies and Kaito carries her away. Elsewhere, Kota decides to eat one of the Helheim fruits with Akira watching in horror. He tells his sister that he has become a different person to help others, upsetting her, while elsewhere, the JSDF arrives. In Drupers, Oren informs the group that if Zack does not return, their plan has failed, causing everyone to panic. The JSDF soldiers arrive at Drupers, having come to evacuate the group from Zawame, but they do not want to leave without Kota and Akira. After arriving to the JSDF pick-up zone, Kota decides to confront Kaito and bids farewell to Akira. Before confronting Kaito, Mai appears to him, and Kota realizes what he wants his future to be as he summons an army of Inves on his side. When Kaito and Kota meet, he tells Kota that he wants to create a new world where the weak will never trampled by the strong as Kota protests about his ideal world. Kaito believes that humans would lose compassion when they gain strength as this would lead them to death without achieving true strength. Kota denies it and intends to show Kaito true strength as they transform and fight alongside their armies of Inves.
46	"The Fated Victor"; Transliteration: "Unmei no Shōsha" (Japanese: 運命の勝者)	Hidenori Ishida	Gen Urobuchi	September 21, 2014
Transforming into Kiwami Arms, Gaim battles Lord Baron and using his strategy to let himself to be overpowered after using all weapons at his disposal by him, with the same fight occurring between Gaim and Baron in an alternate dimension. When Baron let his guard down, Gaim catching and breaking Baron's weapon in half, and using the broken piece in his hand to deal Baron a lethal blow. The defeated Kaito compliments Kota for showing him how strong he has become before expiring, and with the battle over, Mai appears before Kota to award him the Golden Fruit. Upon eating the fruit, Kota becomes the "Man of the Beginning" and Sagara appears as well to congratulate him for his victory. However, instead of rewriting life on Earth just as Sagara had hoped and expected, Kota decides to depart to a new, barren world to start a new life, taking Mai, the Inves, and Helheim Forest with him. Sagara then recognizes his decision and wishes him luck, departing to another world to continue his mission as well, producing another Golden Fruit for a new civilization to fight over. Three months later, life returns to normal in Zawame City and as the Yggdrasill Tower is dismantled, Jonouchi keeps working with Oren at the Charmant bakery, while the Beat Riders now dance together as one single group. A wounded Zack meets Mitsuzane and attempts to have him join the dance group as well, but Mitsuzane is still ashamed for everything he did and refuses. Mitsuzane then leaves to the hospital to visit Takatora, who was discovered alive, but is now in a coma and may be suffering from severe brain damage. Kota appears to Takatora in his dream to ask him to return to Mitsuzane's side in order to help him move on with his life while making amends for his mistakes, and he wakes up with his brother at his side.
47 (Finale)	"Transformation! And to the Future"; Transliteration: "Henshin! Soshite Mirai e" (Japanese: 変身！そして未来へ)	Hidenori Ishida	Jin Haganeya	September 28, 2014
Seven months after Kota and Mai have left the planet, Mitsuzane, reminiscing about his days with Kota, watches the dance groups performing together. The dancers ask him to join them as well, but he declines and leaves. At Charmant, Takatora and Akira have some cake together when a swarm of locusts appears, including the same Locust Monster that Kota once fought. Elsewhere, Mitsuzane meets a young girl possessed by Kogane's spirit who returns to enact revenge, transforming into Kamen Rider Jam. Oren, Jonouchi, and Zack appear to fight as well, but without their Sengoku Drivers, they are easily defeated, and Jam retreats, promising to return to destroy everything Kota and the others fought so much to protect. Reuniting at Drupers, the Beat Riders are informed by Takatora that after the Helheim Forest disappeared, all Sengoku Drivers and Lockseeds possessed by the Yggdrasill Corporation were destroyed and there is no way to fight their newest enemy. However, Jonouchi realizes that Takatora still has a Sengoku Driver and Matsubokkuri Lockseed for emergencies, and after learning from him about Hase's fate, convinces him to fight Jam in his place. Transforming into a Kurokage Trooper, Jonouchi confronts Jam and the Locust Monster, just to be defeated with his Sengoku Driver destroyed as well. However, Mitsuzane appears soon after and with his old Sengoku Driver and transforms into Kamen Rider Ryugen. Ryugen drives Jam into a corner, but once Jam uses the possessed girl as a hostage, Mitsuzane is forced to surrender. Just as Mitsuzane is about to be killed, Kota appears to help him, and has Kogane leave the girl's body. Transforming into Gaim Kiwami Arms, he assists Ryugen in destroying Jam and Kota bids farewell to his friend, while the once downed sacred tree appears once more where it previously stood. A trio of children play beside it, watched from afar by Mai and Kaito's spirit. After being assured that mankind can find its own way despite all its faults, a relieved Kaito departs to the afterlife, and Kota leaves with Mai back to the barren planet where they settled, eventually transforming it into a blue world brimming with life.
