= Kamen Rider Gaim =

- Genre: Tokusatsu; Superhero fiction Slapstick; Science fiction Action adventure Biopunk; Dark fantasy
- Created by: Shotaro Ishinomori
- Developed by: Nitroplus
- Written by: Gen Urobuchi; Toriko Nanajo; Gun Snark; Nobuhiro Mouri; Jin Haganeya; Norimitsu Kaiho
- Directed by: Ryuta Tasaki; Takayuki Shibasaki; Satoshi Morota; Shojiro Nakazawa; Hidenori Ishida; Osamu Kaneda; Kyohei Yamaguchi
- Starring: Gaku Sano; Yutaka Kobayashi; Mahiro Takasugi; Yuumi Shida; Yuki Kubota; Tsunenori Aoki; Minami Tsukui; Gaku Matsuda; Atsushi Shiramata; Ryo Matsuda; Metal Yoshida; Kazuki Namioka; Tomomitsu Yamaguchi; Ren Ozawa; Miina Yokota; Kanon Tsuyama; Saku Momose; Tomohisa Yuge; Rika Izumi; Hiromi Sakimoto
- Voices of: Tomokazu Sugita; Kenjiro Tsuda; Jōji Nakata
- Narrated by: Hōchū Ōtsuka
- Opening theme: "Just Live More" by Gaim no Kaze
- Composer: Kosuke Yamashita
- Country of origin: Japan
- Original language: Japanese
- No. of episodes: 47 (list of episodes)

Production
- Producers: Motoi Sasaki (TV Asahi); Naomi Takebe (Toei); Taku Mochizuki (Toei)
- Running time: 20–25 minutes
- Production companies: Toei Company; Ishimori Productions; TV Asahi Corporation; Asatsu-DK

Original release
- Network: TV Asahi
- Release: October 6, 2013 – September 28, 2014

Related
- Kamen Rider Wizard; Kamen Rider Drive

Kamen Rider Gaim (仮面ライダー鎧武(ガイム), Kamen Raidā Gaimu) is a Japanese television series, a tokusatsu drama that is in the Kamen Rider Series; it is the 15th series during its Heisei run and 24th overall. The series, written by Gen Urobuchi and directed by Ryuta Tasaki it began airing on TV Asahi from October 6, 2013, replacing Kamen Rider Wizard in its initial timeslot and joining Zyuden Sentai Kyoryuger then Ressha Sentai ToQger in the Super Hero Time programming block. Gaim concluded on September 28, 2014 and was replaced by Kamen Rider Drive the following week. The series made a first motif that combines fruits, samurai/warriors, and dance culture in a unique blend of themes. The series is set in a city where dance crews compete for territory, and the story evolves into a deeper tale about power, survival, and responsibility.

== Story ==
In Zawame City, a large company known as the Yggdrasill Corporation transformed the once-bustling suburb a city into a jōkamachi. To escape the resulting feeling of oppression, many of the youth in Zawame formed dance crews called Beat Riders to bring joy back into people's lives. Also rising in popularity is the Inves Game, a simulator that uses strange devices known as Lockseeds to summon monsters known as Inves. Kota Kazuraba, a member of the dance group Team Gaim, tries to find his place in the world while torn between his loyalty to his teammates and his sister Akira's insistence that he starts acting like an adult and finds a proper job. When Team Gaim's captain disappears after informing Kota of a strange belt he found, Kota discovers that the Lockseeds and Inves are from an alternate dimension known as Helheim Forest. Encountering a mysterious girl resembling his Team Gaim teammate and close friend Mai Takatsukasa, Kota uses a Sengoku Driver belt and the Orange Lockseed to become a samurai-armored warrior that is later named Armored Rider Gaim. In the meantime, including Team Baron's leader Kaito Kumon as Armored Rider Baron and Kota's Team Gaim teammate Mitsuzane Kureshima as Ryugen, other Armored Riders appear to amass social power throughout Zawame: Team Raid Wild's Ryoji Hase as Kurokage, Team Invitto's Hideyasu Jonouchi as Gridon, and the perfectionist ex-soldier Alphonso Pierre Oren as Bravo. Unbeknownst to the Armored Riders, the Yggdrasill Corporation monitors them and the Inves Games while the head of its R&D division, Mitsuzane's older brother Takatora, is the enigmatic white Armored Rider Zangetsu who is protecting a dark secret hidden within Helheim Forest.

Eventually, when Kota confronts Takatora as he becomes a New Generation Armored Rider alongside the Armored Rider development scientist Ryoma Sengoku as Duke, his aide Yoko Minato as Marika, and the Lockseed Dealer Sid as Sigurd, he learns the horrible truth of Helheim Forest: that it was home to a once-prosperous civilization that was eradicated by the strange plants growing throughout it, as anyone who consumed the fruit of these plants is turned into an Inves. Finding an ally in DJ Sagara, a pirate radio DJ who knows more than he is letting on such as the intelligent Overlord Inves, Kota finds himself in the middle of a civil war-like brawl among various factions for the right to possess the power of Helheim Forest–the proverbial forbidden fruit itself–and the fate of life on Earth as he knows it. But while adamant to obtain the Golden Fruit to save the world, Kota notices the disastrous news from Oren and Hideyasu that Kaito transforms into his monstrous form and goes insane. His main objective is to use the fruit's power to shatter the status quo of the world before Kota stops his rampage. After Kota successfully stops Kaito's reign and leaves with Mai to another planet, Mitsuzane and the others face off against Kota's old enemy, Kogane.

== Episodes ==
No.	Title	Directed by	Written by	Original release date
1	"Transformation! The Orange From the Sky!?"; Transliteration: "Henshin! Sora kara Orenji!?" (Japanese: 変身！空からオレンジ!?)	Ryuta Tasaki	Gen Urobuchi	October 6, 2013
2	"Deadly! Pineapple Kick!"; Transliteration: "Hissatsu! Pain Kikku!" (Japanese: 必殺！パインキック！)	Ryuta Tasaki	Gen Urobuchi	October 13, 2013
3	"Shock! The Rival's Banana Transformation!?"; Transliteration: "Shōgeki! Raibaru ga Banana Henshin!?" (Japanese: 衝撃！ライバルがバナナ変身!?)	Takayuki Shibasaki	Gen Urobuchi	October 20, 2013
4	"He's Appeared! The Third Grape Rider!"; Transliteration: "Tanjō! San-ninme no Budō Raidā!" (Japanese: 誕生！3人目のぶどうライダー！)	Takayuki Shibasaki	Gen Urobuchi	October 27, 2013
5	"Return! The Ichigo Arms of Friendship!"; Transliteration: "Fukkatsu! Yūjō no Ichigo Āmuzu!" (Japanese: 復活！友情のイチゴアームズ！)	Takayuki Shibasaki	Gen Urobuchi	November 10, 2013
6	"The Durian Rider Appears!"; Transliteration: "Dorian Raidā, Sansen!" (Japanese: ドリアンライダー、参戦！)	Satoshi Morota	Gen Urobuchi	November 17, 2013
7	"Great Ball Watermelon, Big Bang!"; Transliteration: "Ōdama Suika, Biggu Ban!" (Japanese: 大玉スイカ、ビッグバン！)	Satoshi Morota	Gen Urobuchi	November 24, 2013
8	"Baron's New Mango Power"; Transliteration: "Baron no Atarashiki Chikara, Mangō" (Japanese: バロンの新しき力、マンゴー)	Shojiro Nakazawa	Gen Urobuchi; Toriko Nanajo	December 1, 2013
9	"The Great "Inves Monster Capturing" Operation!"; Transliteration: "Kaibutsu Inbesu Hokaku Daisakusen!" (Japanese: 怪物インベス捕獲大作戦！)	Shojiro Nakazawa	Gen Urobuchi	December 8, 2013
10	"All the Riders Gather! Revealing the Forest's Mystery!"; Transliteration: "Raidā Daishūketsu! Mori no Nazo o Abake!" (Japanese: ライダー大集結！森の謎を暴け！)	Takayuki Shibasaki	Gen Urobuchi; Gun Snark	December 15, 2013
11	"The Truth Behind the Christmas Game"; Transliteration: "Kurisumasu Gēmu no Shinjitsu" (Japanese: クリスマスゲームの真実)	Takayuki Shibasaki	Gen Urobuchi; Nobuhiro Mouri	December 22, 2013
12	"The New Generation Rider Appears!"; Transliteration: "Shin Sedai Raidā Tōjō!" (Japanese: 新世代ライダー登場！)	Hidenori Ishida	Gen Urobuchi	January 5, 2014
13	"The Friendship Tag Team of Gaim and Baron!"; Transliteration: "Gaimu, Baron no Yūjō Taggu!" (Japanese: 鎧武、バロンの友情タッグ！)	Hidenori Ishida	Gen Urobuchi	January 12, 2014
14	"The Secret of Helheim's Fruits"; Transliteration: "Heruheimu no Kajitsu no Himitsu" (Japanese: ヘルヘイムの果実の秘密)	Satoshi Morota	Gen Urobuchi	January 19, 2014
15	"The Man Who Developed the Belts"; Transliteration: "Beruto o Kaihatsu Shita Otoko" (Japanese: ベルトを開発した男)	Satoshi Morota	Gen Urobuchi	January 26, 2014
16	"A New Arms! Jimber Lemon Is Born!"; Transliteration: "Shin Āmuzu! Jinbā Remon Tanjō!" (Japanese: 新アームズ！ジンバーレモン誕生！)	Osamu Kaneda	Gen Urobuchi	February 2, 2014
17	"The Peach Rider Marika Descends!"; Transliteration: "Momo no Raidā, Marika Kōrin!" (Japanese: 桃のライダー、マリカ光臨！)	Osamu Kaneda	Gen Urobuchi	February 9, 2014
18	"Farewell Beat Riders"; Transliteration: "Saraba Bīto Raidāzu" (Japanese: さらばビートライダーズ)	Hidenori Ishida	Gen Urobuchi; Nobuhiro Mouri	February 16, 2014
19	"The Gift Secret Weapon"; Transliteration: "Okurareta Himitsu Heiki" (Japanese: 贈られた秘密兵器)	Hidenori Ishida	Gen Urobuchi; Nobuhiro Mouri	February 23, 2014
20	"The End of the World, the Invasion Begins"; Transliteration: "Sekai no Owari Hajimaru Shinryaku" (Japanese: 世界のおわり はじまる侵略)	Satoshi Morota	Gen Urobuchi	March 2, 2014
21	"Yggdrasill's Secret"; Transliteration: "Yugudorashiru no Himitsu" (Japanese: ユグドラシルの秘密)	Satoshi Morota	Gen Urobuchi	March 9, 2014
22	"A Seventh of the Truth"; Transliteration: "Nana-bun-no-Ichi no Shinjitsu" (Japanese: 7分の1の真実)	Osamu Kaneda	Gen Urobuchi	March 16, 2014
23	"Now Let's Go! Kachidoki Arms!"; Transliteration: "Iza Shutsujin! Kachidoki Āmuzu!" (Japanese: いざ出陣！カチドキアームズ！)	Osamu Kaneda	Gen Urobuchi	March 23, 2014
SP	"Ressha Sentai ToQger vs. Kamen Rider Gaim: Spring Break Combined Special"; Transliteration: "Ressha Sentai Tokkyūjā Tai Kamen Raidā Gaimu Haruyasumi Gattai Supesharu" (Japanese: 烈車戦隊トッキュウジャーＶＳ仮面ライダー鎧武 春休み合体スペシャル)	Shojiro Nakazawa	Nobuhiro Mouri	March 30, 2014
24	"The New Formidable Overlords"; Transliteration: "Aratana Kyōteki Ōbārōdo" (Japanese: 新たな強敵オーバーロード)	Hidenori Ishida	Gen Urobuchi	April 6, 2014
25	"Gridon and Bravo's Strongest Tag Team"; Transliteration: "Guridon Burābo Saikyō Taggu" (Japanese: グリドン・ブラーボ最強タッグ)	Hidenori Ishida	Gen Urobuchi; Jin Haganeya	April 13, 2014
26	"Baron's Genesis Transformation!"; Transliteration: "Baron no Geneshisu Henshin!" (Japanese: バロンのゲネシス変身！)	Satoshi Morota	Gen Urobuchi; Jin Haganeya	April 20, 2014
27	"Time to Know the Truth"; Transliteration: "Shinjitsu o Shiru Toki" (Japanese: 真実を知る時)	Satoshi Morota	Gen Urobuchi	April 27, 2014
28	"The Betrayal of Zangetsu"; Transliteration: "Uragiri no Zangetsu" (Japanese: 裏切りの斬月)	Takayuki Shibasaki	Gen Urobuchi; Jin Haganeya	May 4, 2014
29	"The Overlord King"; Transliteration: "Ōbārōdo no Ō" (Japanese: オーバーロードの王)	Takayuki Shibasaki	Gen Urobuchi	May 11, 2014
30	"The Red and Blue Kikaider"; Transliteration: "Aka to Ao no Kikaidā" (Japanese: 赤と青のキカイダー)	Ryuta Tasaki	Nobuhiro Mouri	May 18, 2014
31	"The Whereabouts of the Forbidden Fruit"; Transliteration: "Kindan no Kajitsu no Yukue" (Japanese: 禁断の果実のゆくえ)	Ryuta Tasaki	Gen Urobuchi	May 25, 2014
32	"The Strongest Power! Kiwami Arms"; Transliteration: "Saikyō no Chikara! Kiwami Āmuzu" (Japanese: 最強の力！極アームズ)	Hidenori Ishida	Gen Urobuchi	June 1, 2014
33	"The Great Beat Riders' Gathering!"; Transliteration: "Bīto Raidāzu Daishūketsu!" (Japanese: ビートライダーズ大集結！)	Hidenori Ishida	Gen Urobuchi; Norimitsu Kaihō	June 8, 2014
34	"The King's Power and the Queen's Revival"; Transliteration: "Ō no Chikara to Ōhi Fukkatsu" (Japanese: 王の力と王妃復活)	Satoshi Morota	Gen Urobuchi; Jin Haganeya	June 22, 2014
35	"Mitchy's Ark"; Transliteration: "Mitchi no Hakobune" (Japanese: ミッチの箱舟)	Satoshi Morota	Gen Urobuchi	June 29, 2014
36	"A Brotherly Conclusion! Zangetsu vs. Zangetsu Shin!"; Transliteration: "Kyōdai no Ketchaku! Zangetsu VS Zangetsu Shin!" (Japanese: 兄弟の決着！斬月VS斬月・真！)	Takayuki Shibasaki	Gen Urobuchi	July 6, 2014
37	"Baron Soccer Showdown: Summer Camp!"; Transliteration: "Baron Sakkā Taiketsu Natsu no Jin!" (Japanese: バロン・サッカー対決 夏の陣！)	Takayuki Shibasaki	Nobuhiro Mouri	July 13, 2014
38	"Return of the Professor"; Transliteration: "Purofessā no Kikan" (Japanese: プロフェッサーの帰還)	Kyohei Yamaguchi	Gen Urobuchi; Jin Haganeya	July 20, 2014
39	"The Suicide Plan to Break Into Tower!"; Transliteration: "Kesshi no Tawā Totsunyū Sakusen!" (Japanese: 決死のタワー突入作戦！)	Kyohei Yamaguchi	Gen Urobuchi	July 27, 2014
40	"The Overlord Awakens"; Transliteration: "Ōbārōdo e no Mezame" (Japanese: オーバーロードへの目覚め)	Hidenori Ishida	Gen Urobuchi	August 10, 2014
41	"A Duel with the Overlord King!"; Transliteration: "Gekitotsu! Ōbārōdo no Ō" (Japanese: 激突！オーバーロードの王)	Hidenori Ishida	Gen Urobuchi; Jin Haganeya	August 17, 2014
42	"Mitsuzane's Last Transformation!"; Transliteration: "Mitsuzane! Saigo no Henshin!" (Japanese: 光実！最後の変身！)	Satoshi Morota	Gen Urobuchi; Jin Haganeya	August 24, 2014
43	"Baron's Ultimate Transformation"; Transliteration: "Baron Kyūkyoku no Henshin" (Japanese: バロン 究極の変身)	Satoshi Morota	Gen Urobuchi	August 31, 2014
44	"The Future Goals of Two People"; Transliteration: "Futari no Mezasu Mirai wa" (Japanese: 二人の目指す未来は)	Osamu Kaneda	Gen Urobuchi; Jin Haganeya	September 7, 2014
45	"The Final Battle of the Two Destined People!"; Transliteration: "Unmei no Futari Saishū Batoru!" (Japanese: 運命の二人 最終バトル！)	Osamu Kaneda	Gen Urobuchi	September 14, 2014
46	"The Fated Victor"; Transliteration: "Unmei no Shōsha" (Japanese: 運命の勝者)	Hidenori Ishida	Gen Urobuchi	September 21, 2014
47 (Finale)	"Transformation! And to the Future"; Transliteration: "Henshin! Soshite Mirai e" (Japanese: 変身！そして未来へ)	Hidenori Ishida	Jin Haganeya	September 28, 2014

== Films ==
=== The Fateful Sengoku Movie Battle ===
Kamen Rider × Kamen Rider Gaim & Wizard: The Fateful Sengoku Movie Battle (仮面ライダー×仮面ライダー 鎧武&ウィザード 天下分け目の戦国MOVIE大合戦, Kamen Raidā × Kamen Raidā Gaimu Ando Wizādo Tenkawakeme no Sengoku Mūbī Daigassen), released on December 14, 2013, is the annual entry of the "Movie Wars" film series, featuring a crossover between the cast and characters from Kamen Rider Gaim and Kamen Rider Wizard. A short teaser of the film was first shown during the screening of Kamen Rider Wizard in Magic Land, with a later teaser shown after the finale of Wizard announcing the release date. The events of the movie take place between episodes 9 and 10.

=== Kamen Rider Taisen ===
Heisei Rider vs. Shōwa Rider: Kamen Rider Taisen feat. Super Sentai (平成ライダー対昭和ライダー 仮面ライダー大戦 feat.スーパー戦隊, Heisei Raidā Tai Shōwa Raidā Kamen Raidā Taisen Fīcharingu Sūpā Sentai) was released in Japanese theaters on March 29, 2014. It was first hinted at in a trailer after The Fateful Sengoku Movie Battle. Many previous series' leading actors returned for the film, with Masahiro Inoue of Kamen Rider Decade, Renn Kiriyama of Kamen Rider W, and Kohei Murakami and Kento Handa of Kamen Rider 555, initially confirmed, with a subsequent trailer for the film also showing Shunya Shiraishi from Kamen Rider Wizard. Kento Handa, on his Ustream channel, announced that he had been on set with Ryo Hayami of Kamen Rider X, and Hiroshi Fujioka of the original Kamen Rider was announced as being in the cast. In a recent trailer and magazine, the Sentai teams' Ressha Sentai ToQger and Zyuden Sentai Kyoryuger were confirmed to be in the movie, Shun Sugata of the Birth of the 10th! Kamen Riders All Together!! TV special returns and also played a new double role as Ambassador Darkness, and Itsuji Itao of Kamen Rider The First played as Ren Aoi, a main antagonist of the film. It has been reported that Ryo Ryusei would return as Daigo Kiryu. The events of the movie take place between episodes 23 and 24.

=== Great Soccer Battle! Golden Fruits Cup! ===
Kamen Rider Gaim the Movie: Great Soccer Battle! Golden Fruits Cup! (劇場版 仮面ライダー鎧武 サッカー大決戦!黄金の果実争奪杯（カップ）!, Gekijōban Kamen Raidā Gaimu Sakkā Daikessen! Ōgon no Kajitsu Sōdatsu Kappu!) was released in Japanese theaters on July 19, 2014, double-billed with Ressha Sentai ToQger the Movie: Galaxy Line S.O.S.. It was a collaboration with the Japanese soccer league J. League and featured cameo appearances by professional soccer players. The film's antagonist Kogane, Kamen Rider Mars, was portrayed by kabuki actor Kataoka Ainosuke VI. The events of the movie take place between episodes 37 and 38.

=== Movie War Full Throttle ===
Kamen Rider × Kamen Rider Drive & Gaim: Movie War Full Throttle (仮面ライダー×仮面ライダードライブ&鎧武 MOVIE大戦フルスロットル, Kamen Raidā × Kamen Raidā Doraibu Ando Gaimu Mūbī Taisen Furu Surottoru) was released in Japanese theaters on December 13, 2014. It featured a crossover with the then airing Kamen Rider series Kamen Rider Drive as well as the epilogue of Gaim's story, reuniting the main cast.

=== Heisei Generations Final ===
A Movie War film, titled Kamen Rider Heisei Generations Final: Build & Ex-Aid with Legend Rider (仮面ライダー平成ジェネレーションズ FINAL ビルド&エグゼイドwithレジェンドライダー, Kamen Raidā Heisei Jenerēshonzu Fainaru Birudo Ando Eguzeido Wizu Rejendo Raidā) was announced to be released on December 9, 2017. Along the casts of Kamen Rider Build & Kamen Rider Ex-Aid, Shu Watanabe and Ryosuke Miura (Kamen Rider OOO), Sota Fukushi (Kamen Rider Fourze), Gaku Sano (Kamen Rider Gaim), & Shun Nishime (Kamen Rider Ghost) reprised their respective roles.

== Hyper Battle DVD ==
As with every year, Televi-kun sells a limited edition "Hyper Battle DVD" (超（ハイパー）バトルDVD, Haipā Batoru Dī Bui Dī) that tells a unique and non-canon story of the members of the cast. For Gaim, the DVD is titled Kamen Rider Gaim: Fresh Orange Arms Is Born! ~You Can Also Seize It! The Power of Fresh~ (仮面ライダー鎧武 フレッシュオレンジアームズ誕生！～君もつかめ！フレッシュの力～, Kamen Raidā Gaimu Furesshu Orenji Āmuzu Tanjō! ~Kimi mo Tsukame! Furesshu no Chikara~). During the events of the DVD, Kota and Kaito learn their Lockseeds rusted as they and Mai are visited by the mysterious girl who cryptically tells them the best way to restore the Lockseeds is to make them "fresh." From cleaning the Team Gaim garage to Kaito making a fruit tart and then Mai setting up a fashion show, future Mai explains the final step is a fresh smile. Though Kota succeeds with his Lockseed transformed into a Fresh Orange Lockseed, Kaito is disillusioned and decides to go to Hellheim Forest. Found by Kamen Riders Zangetsu and Ryugen, who respectively equip the Mango and Pine Lockseeds, Kaito becomes Kamen Rider Baron Kiwi Arms to call out Kota as he transforms into the shiny Kamen Rider Gaim Fresh Orange Arms.

== Gaim Gaiden ==
Gaim Gaiden (鎧武外伝, Gaimu Gaiden; "Gaim Side Story") is a set of two V-Cinema releases that focus on side stories of Takatora Kureshima as Kamen Rider Zangetsu and Kaito Kumon as Kamen Rider Baron. Both releases are named after their primary character. The films feature two new Kamen Riders, Kamen Rider Idun and Kamen Rider Tyrant. The V-Cinemas were released on April 22, 2015. The events of the movie take place between episodes 20 and 21.

A second Gaim Gaiden focusing on side stories of Ryoma Sengoku as Kamen Rider Duke and Zack as Kamen Rider Knuckle was released on November 11, 2015. The films feature two new Kamen Riders, Kamen Rider Saver and Kamen Rider Black Baron.

A third Gaim Gaiden titled Kamen Rider Gridon vs. Kamen Rider Bravo (仮面ライダーグリドンVS仮面ライダーブラーボ, Kamen Raidā Guridon Tai Kamen Raidā Burābo) focusing on a side story of Hideyasu Jonouchi as Kamen Rider Gridon and Oren Pierre Alfonso as Kamen Rider Bravo was released on Toei Tokusatsu Fan Club on October 25, 2020. The web series features a new Kamen Rider, Kamen Rider Sylphy.

== Novels ==
- Novel: Kamen Rider Gaim (小説 仮面ライダー鎧武, Shōsetsu Kamen Raidā Gaimu): A novel that was written by Gun Snark and Jin Haganeya and supervised by Gen Urobuchi and is part of a series of spin-off novel adaptions of the Heisei Era Kamen Riders. The events of the novel take place after Kamen Rider Knuckle of Gaim Gaiden: Kamen Rider Duke/Kamen Rider Knuckle. The novel was released on March 24, 2016.
- Novel: Kamen Rider Gaim Gaiden: Kamen Rider Zangetsu (小説 仮面ライダー鎧武外伝 仮面ライダー斬月, Shōsetsu Kamen Raidā Gaimu Gaiden Kamen Raidā Zangetsu): A novelization of the 2019 stage play Kamen Rider Zangetsu: Gaim Gaiden (仮面ライダー斬月‐鎧武外伝‐, Kamen Raidā Zangetsu -Gaimu Gaiden-). The novel was written by Nobuhiro Mouri and released on June 1, 2020. The events of the novel take place before Kamen Rider Gridon vs. Kamen Rider Bravo.

== Video game ==
A PlayStation 3 and Wii U sequel to Kamen Rider: Battride War titled Kamen Rider: Battride War II (仮面ライダー バトライド・ウォーII, Kamen Raidā Batoraido Wō Tsū) was released on June 26, 2014. It featured characters from Gaim as well as characters and scenarios based on the then-recent Kamen Rider series and films. A limited-edition version of the game featuring music from the TV series and films was also released.

== Production and development ==
Kamen Rider Gaim's "Orange Arms" form comes from Japanese armor and the orange.

Trademarks on Kamen Rider Gaim were requested on May 20, 2013, and the show was officially announced on July 25, 2013. The series producer, Naomi Takebe, wanted Gaim to return to the style of early Heisei era series, in which multiple Riders are featured. Drawing inspiration from the Sengoku period, Bandai presented the idea of using fruits as a core theme to Takebe, which led to the creation of the Arms Change. Takebe approached Gen Urobuchi, known for Puella Magi Madoka Magica and Fate/Zero, to serve as the series main writer, and Ryuta Tasaki, who had previously worked on Kamen Rider Agito and Kamen Rider Ryuki, to direct. In an interview, Urobuchi states that Takebe requested that the series not follow the two-episode structure of recent series, as well as saying that he hopes to create the same kind of excitement he felt from Kamen Rider Black to a new generation. Urobuchi's company Nitroplus also assisted with designs.

The show's lead role went to 2011 Junon Super Boy Contest Grand Prix winner Gaku Sano, portraying Kota Kazuraba. Sano said that he grew up wishing he could be the character from Kamen Rider Kuuga, and now that he would portray Kamen Rider Gaim he hopes that he will inspire a new generation of boys. Rounding out the main cast are Yutaka Kobayashi as Kaito Kumon/Kamen Rider Baron, Mahiro Takasugi as Mitsuzane Kureshima/Kamen Rider Ryugen, Yuumi Shida from idol group Yumemiru Adolescence as the heroine Mai Takatsukasa, and Yuki Kubota as Takatora Kureshima/Kamen Rider Zangetsu.

== Cast ==
- Kota Kazuraba (葛葉 紘汰, Kazuraba Kōta): Gaku Sano (佐野 岳, Sano Gaku)
- Kaito Kumon (駆紋 戒斗, Kumon Kaito): Yutaka Kobayashi (小林 豊, Kobayashi Yutaka)
- Mitsuzane Kureshima (呉島 光実, Kureshima Mitsuzane): Mahiro Takasugi (高杉 真宙, Takasugi Mahiro)
- Mai Takatsukasa (高司 舞, Takatsukasa Mai), Maiden of Fate (運命の巫女, Unmei no Miko): Yuumi Shida (志田 友美, Shida Yūmi)
- Takatora Kureshima (呉島 貴虎, Kureshima Takatora): Yuki Kubota (久保田 悠来, Kubota Yūki)
- Ryoma Sengoku (戦極 凌馬, Sengoku Ryōma): Tsunenori Aoki (青木 玄徳, Aoki Tsunenori)
- Yoko Minato (湊 耀子, Minato Yōko): Minami Tsukui (佃井 皆美, Tsukui Minami)
- Chucky (チャッキー, Chakkī): Kanon Tsuyama (津山 香音, Tsuyama Kanon; of Lucky Color's)
- Rica (リカ, Rika): Miina Yokota (横田 美菜, Yokota Miina; of Lucky Color's)
- Rat (ラット, Ratto): Ren Ozawa (小澤 廉, Ozawa Ren)
- Zack (ザック, Zakku): Gaku Matsuda (松田 岳, Matsuda Gaku)
- Peko (ペコ): Saku Momose (百瀬 朔, Momose Saku)
- Ryoji Hase (初瀬 亮二, Hase Ryōji): Atsushi Shiramata (白又 敦, Shiramata Atsushi)
- Hideyasu Jonouchi (城乃内 秀保, Jōnouchi Hideyasu): Ryo Matsuda (松田 凌, Matsuda Ryō)
- Alfonso Pierre Oren (凰蓮・ピエール・アルフォンゾ, Ōren Piēru Arufonzo): Metal Yoshida (吉田 メタル, Yoshida Metaru)
- Akira Kazuraba (葛葉 晶, Kazuraba Akira): Rika Izumi (泉 里香, Izumi Rika)
- Kiyojiro Bando (阪東 清治郎, Bandō Kiyojirō): Tomohisa Yuge (弓削 智久, Yuge Tomohisa)
- Sid (シド, Shido): Kazuki Namioka (波岡 一喜, Namioka Kazuki)
- DJ Sagara (DJサガラ, Dī Jei Sagara): Tomomitsu Yamaguchi (山口 智充, Yamaguchi Tomomitsu)

=== Voice cast ===
- Dēmushu (デェムシュ): Tomokazu Sugita (杉田 智和, Sugita Tomokazu)
- Redyue (レデュエ): Kenjiro Tsuda (津田 健次郎, Tsuda Kenjirō)
- Roshuo (ロシュオ): Jōji Nakata (中田 譲治, Nakata Jōji)
- Sengoku Driver (センゴクドライバー, Sengoku Doraibā): Seiji Hiratoko (平床 政治, Hiratoko Seiji)
- Genesis Driver (ゲネシスドライバー, Geneshisu Doraibā): Shin-ichiro Miki (三木 眞一郎, Miki Shinichirō)
- Narrator: Hōchū Ōtsuka (大塚 芳忠, Ōtsuka Hōchū)

=== Guest cast ===
- Yuya Sumii (角居 裕也, Sumii Yūya; 1, 14, 40): Hiromi Sakimoto (崎本 大海, Sakimoto Hiromi)
- Team Pop Up (チームPOP UP, Chīmu Poppu Appu; 18): Kamen Rider Girls (仮面ライダーGIRLS, Kamen Raidā Gāruzu)
- Jiro (ジロー, Jirō; 30): Jingi Irie (入江 甚儀, Irie Jingi)
- Lapis (ラピス, Rapisu; 37): Taketo Tanaka (田中 偉登, Tanaka Taketo)
- Kamen Rider Mars (仮面ライダーマルス, Kamen Raidā Marusu; Voice; 37): Kataoka Ainosuke VI (六代目 片岡 愛之助, Rokudaime Kataoka Ainosuke)
- Kengo Nakamura (中村 憲剛, Nakamura Kengo; of Kawasaki Frontale; 37)
- Kosuke Ota (太田 宏介, Ōta Kōsuke; of F.C. Tokyo; 37)
- Queen (王妃, Ōhi; 41): Hiromi Iwasaki (岩崎 ひろみ, Iwasaki Hiromi)

== Theme songs ==
Opening theme

- "Just Live More"
  - Lyrics: Shoko Fujibayashi
  - Composition & Arrangement: Shuhei Naruse
  - Artist: Gaim no Kaze (鎧武乃風, Gaimu no Kaze)

Insert themes

- "E-X-A (Exciting×Attitude)"
  - Lyrics: Shoko Fujibayashi
  - Composition & Arrangement: tatsuo (of everset)
  - Artist: Kamen Rider Girls
  - Episodes: 3, 5, 11
  "E-X-A (Exciting×Attitude)" is the theme for Kamen Rider Gaim.
- "Never surrender"
  - Lyrics: Shoko Fujibayashi
  - Composition & Arrangement: Junichi "IGAO" Igarashi
  - Artist: Team Baron (Kaito Kumon, Zack, & Peco) (Yutaka Kobayashi, Gaku Matsuda, & Saku Momose)
  - Episodes: 8, 26, 37
  "Never surrender" is the theme for Kamen Rider Baron.
- "Toki no Hana" (時の華; "Flower of Time")
  - Lyrics: Shoko Fujibayashi
  - Composition: Naoki Maeda
  - Arrangement: Shuhei Naruse
  - Artist: Kamen Rider Girls
  - Episodes: 17, 21, 29
  "Toki no Hana" is the theme for Kamen Rider Gaim Jimber Lemon Arms.
- "Raise Up Your Flag"
  - Lyrics: Shoko Fujibayashi
  - Composition & Arrangement: tatsuo (of everset)
  - Artist: Kota Kazuraba (Gaku Sano)
  - Episodes: Spring Break Combined Special, 24, 28, 30, 37
  "Raise Up Your Flag" is the theme for Kamen Rider Gaim Kachidoki Arms.
- "Ranbu Escalation" (乱舞Escalation; "Dancing Escalation")
  - Lyrics: Shoko Fujibayashi
  - Composition & Arrangement: Shuhei Naruse
  - Artist: Kota Kazuraba & Kaito Kumon (Gaku Sano & Yutaka Kobayashi)
  - Episodes: 36–37, 39, 41, 45
  "Ranbu Escalation" is the theme for Kamen Rider Gaim Kiwami Arms and Baron Lemon Energy Arms.
