= Saboten (pop-punk band) =

Japanese rock band

Saboten (Japanese "cactus") is a Japanese rock band founded in Osaka in 1999. From 2004-2007 they were Sony Music Japan artists. Their song "Scenario" was used as the end theme to the anime Naruto.

== Albums ==
- Hi Rock Hi
- No Rain No Rainbow
- Circus
- Islands SRCL-6257
- Classic 2007 SRCL-6491
- Saboten Rock EXCR-1006
- Green Hole 2010 BZCS-1072
- This is a pen! 2012 PINE-0020
- White Pool 2012 PINE-0024
- 1億3千万人が選ぶSABOTEN傑作集 PINE-0028
- Master Peace 2015

Appearances on compilation albums

- Junk 2 2002
- Punk Rock Camp 2002
- Punk JukeBox 2
- The 青春 Punk Rock
- Green Days 2003
- E.V.Junkie SRCL-5597/8 - 23 in Oricon album chart
- 京阪 Wave
- Nagoya Chorus Live 友情編
- Naruto Super Hits 2006-2008 VWC-7561/2
- Out of this World 4 SURCD-008
- Make Merry Christmas
- QP Special Tribute
