= Just Live More =

- Standard CD-only edition cover featuring the protagonist of Kamen Rider Gaim

Single by Gaim no Kaze
- Released: December 11, 2013
- Recorded: 2013
- Genre: J-Pop
- Length: 3:47
- Label: Avex Entertainment
- Songwriters: Shoko Fujibayashi, Shuhei Naruse

Shōnan no Kaze singles chronology
"Setsugekka" (2013)	"Just Live More" (2013)

Kamen Rider Series theme song singles chronology
"Life Is Show Time" (2012)	"Just Live More" (2013)	"Surprise Drive" (2014)

"Just Live More" (stylized as JUST LIVE MORE) is a song by Japanese reggae band Shōnan no Kaze under the name "Gaim no Kaze" (鎧武乃風, Gaimu no Kaze), released on December 11, 2013. It serves as the opening theme song for the children's television series Kamen Rider Gaim.

== Background ==
Shōnan no Kaze (or rather Gaim no Kaze) were first announced to be performing the theme song of the new Kamen Rider Series Kamen Rider Gaim at a press conference for the TV show in late July 2013. In an interview at the conference, band member Red Rice felt honored that he would join the ranks of famous artists who have performed the series' theme songs. Shock Eye revealed he had long been a fan of the series as a child, and even in adulthood. Wakadanna spoke of how he liked the motorcycles and as a child wished he had one as well, as the show seems to have instilled a fighting spirit in those who watch it. Han-kun was jokingly critical about the show's fruit motif, but then said that he knew children would love the show.

Three versions of the single were released: a standard CD only version, a CD and DVD dual disc set, and a special edition CD and DVD dual disc set that included a limited edition towel.

== Track listing ==
All lyrics are written by Shoko Fujibayashi; all music is composed by Shuhei Naruse.

No.	Title	Length
1.	"JUST LIVE MORE"	3:47
2.	"JUST LIVE MORE" (Orchestra Edit)	3:30
3.	"JUST LIVE MORE" (Instrumental)	3:45
Total length:		11:03

CD+DVD version
No.	Title	Length
1.	"JUST LIVE MORE" (Music Video)

== Chart performance ==
"Just Live More" debuted and peaked on Billboard Japan's Japan Hot 100 at number 8 and the Hot Singles Sales chart at number 5 on December 23, 2013. Its peak performance on the Oricon's Weekly Singles Charts was at number 6, with 14 weeks spent on the charts.

The single was certified gold for 100,000 digital downloads by the RIAJ in April 2014.
