= Setsugekka =

Setsugekka or Setsu-getsu-ka (雪月花, lit. 'Snow, Moon and Flowers') may refer to:

- Snow Moon Flowers, a Japanese topic in art and design borrowed from Ancient China
- Setsugekka, a resort train operated by the Echigo Tokimeki Railway in Japan
- "Setsu Getsu Ka", a 1998 song by Japanese singer Shizuka Kudo
- "Setsugekka (The End of Silence)/Zan", a 2009 single by the Japanese singer Gackt
- "Setsugetsuka" (song), a 2018 song from Uta no Prince-sama: Shining Live
