= Saboten (all-female band) =

Japanese band

- Origin: Tokyo, Japan
- Genres: Art punk, post-punk, new wave
- Years active: 1981–?
- Labels: Floor, Sabot
- Past members: Satomi Matsumoto; Izumi Miyakawa; Atsushi Miyakawa; Ryoko Morisue
- Website: saboten.biz

Saboten was an all-female post-punk Japanese band of the 1980s. The Tokyo-based band's experiments including works playing with the music of Erik Satie, and collaborations with Lol Coxhill.

== Albums ==
- Saboten 1981
- Awake 1984
