= List of Kamen Rider Fourze characters =

Kamen Rider Fourze (仮面ライダーフォーゼ, Kamen Raidā Fōze) is a Japanese tokusatsu series that serves as the 22nd installment in the Kamen Rider franchise and the 13th entry in the Heisei era. Transfer student Gentaro Kisaragi transforms into the titular hero Kamen Rider Fourze to battle the constellation-themed monsters called Zodiarts. Series' producer Hideaki Tsukuda initially planned on including various past Kamen Riders in the series to commemorate Kamen Rider's 40th anniversary. However, due to past series Kamen Rider Decade celebrating the 10th anniversary of the Heisei Kamen Riders, Kamen Rider Fourze appreciates the previous Kamen Riders' history and treats them as urban legends in-universe.

The primary setting of the series is the fictional Amanogawa High School (天ノ川学園高校, Amanogawa Gakuen Kōkō), (Note: Amanogawa (天の川) is a Japanese word that refers to the Milky Way as found in legends and which literally translates to "the river of the heavens".) abbreviated as AGHS (天高, Amakō), which the main characters attend. Additionally, the monstrous Horoscopes seek to transform AGHS' students and faculty into more of their kind to expand their ranks.

== Kamen Rider Club ==
The Kamen Rider Club (仮面ライダー部, Kamen Raidā-bu) is a club that Gentaro Kisaragi forms to gain new friends at AGHS, using past Kamen Riders as inspiration. After Gentaro becomes Kamen Rider Fourze, the club's members assist him in his battles against the Zodiarts and investigate the urban legends that surround the past Kamen Riders' existence. The club's headquarters is the remains of the Rabbit Hatch (ラビットハッチ, Rabitto Hatchi) moonbase, which is accessed by a Cosmic Energy (コズミックエナジー, Kozumikku Enajī) powered portal found in a locker in an abandoned section of the AGHS campus and was originally owned by the Outer Space Technology Organization (外宇宙技術開発機構, Gai Uchū Gijutsu Kaihatsu Kikō), abbreviated as OSTO (オスト, Osuto), which developed Fourze's technology and the Zodiarts Switches. After losing the Rabbit Hatch to the Zodiarts in the series finale, the Kamen Rider Club is reworked to become the Earth-based Space Kamen Rider Club (宇宙仮面ライダー部, Uchū Kamen Raidā-bu).

=== Gentaro Kisaragi ===
Gentaro Kisaragi (如月 弦太朗, Kisaragi Gentarō) is a second-year, later third-year, student at AGHS with a reckless, bad-boy image due to his delinquent yankee fashion sense coupled with a sociable attitude and a desire to befriend everyone he comes across. Throughout his time at AGHS, he goes on to become Kamen Rider Fourze and form the Kamen Rider Club.

Five years later, as of the events of the crossover film Kamen Rider × Kamen Rider Wizard & Fourze: Movie War Ultimatum, Gentaro has become an AGHS teacher and the Kamen Rider Club's new academic advisor before sacrificing his Rider powers to help his student Saburo Kazeta defeat Kageto Banba.

The Fourze System consists of a space suit, the Fourze Driver (フォーゼドライバー, Fōze Doraibā) belt, and 40 numbered Astroswitches (アストロスイッチ, Asutorosuitchi), all of which harness Cosmic Energy and were reverse-engineered from the Presenters' Core Switch by Rokuro Utahoshi, who was inspired by the Four Symbols and a hypothetical friendship-based system used by Kyoto's citizens' ancestors. As such, Gentaro is the only one who can access the Fourze System's full potential. Additionally, Mitsuaki Gamou compares Fourze's power to that of a gravitational lens due to Gentaro's influence on Astroswitches and Zodiarts Switches.

Utilizing the Fourze Driver and four Astroswitches, Gentaro can transform into Kamen Rider Fourze Base States (ベースステイツ, Bēsu Suteitsu). While transformed, he is equipped with a hover pack. He can also activate the Astroswitches' Fourze Modules (フォーゼモジュール, Fōze Mojūru) to assist him in combat and perform varying Limit Break (リミットブレイク, Rimitto Bureiku) finishers based on his active Fourze Modules, such as the Rider Rocket Drill Kick (ライダーロケットドリルキック, Raidā Roketto Doriru Kikku) via the right forearm-mounted Rocket Module (ロケットモジュール, Rokketto Mojūru) and the left shin-mounted Drill Module (ドリルモジュール, Doriru Mojūru). His personal vehicle is the Machine Massigler (マシンマッシグラー, Mashin Masshigurā) motorcycle. Additionally, the power of certain Astroswitches allow Gentaro to assume varying States (ステイツ, Suteitsu) forms, which are as follows:

- Elek States (エレキステイツ, Ereki Suteitsu): An auxiliary form accessed from the Elek (エレキ, Ereki) Switch that grants electrokinesis. In this form, Gentaro wields the Billy The Rod (ビリーザロッド, Birī Za Roddo) baton. His Limit Breaks in this form are the Rider 10 Billion Volt Break (ライダー100億ボルトブレイク, Raidā Hyakuoku Boruto Bureiku), Rider 10 Billion Volt Shoot (ライダー100億ボルトシュート, Raidā Hyakuoku Boruto Shūto), and Rider 10 Billion Volt Burst (ライダー100億ボルトバースト, Raidā Hyakuoku Boruto Bāsuto) via the Billy the Rod and the Rider Lightning Drill Kick (ライダー電光ドリルキック, Raidā Denkō Doriru Kikku) via the Drill Module.
- Fire States (ファイヤーステイツ, Faiyā Suteitsu): An auxiliary form accessed from the Fire (ファイヤー, Faiyā) Switch that grants pyrokinesis. In this form, Gentaro wields the Hee-Hack Gun (ヒーハックガン, Hīhakku Gan), which has a Flame Mode (火炎モード, Kaen Mōdo) for performing the Rider Exploding Shoot (ライダー爆熱シュート, Raidā Bakunetsu Shūto) Limit Break and a Fire Extinguisher Mode (消火モード, Shōka Mōdo) for performing a Limit Break that shoots pressurized water.
- Magnet States (マグネットステイツ, Magunetto Suteitsu): Gentaro's super form accessed from the two-in-one NS-Magphone (NSマグフォン, Enu Esu Magufon), which consists of the joystick-like N Magnet (Nマグネット, Enu Magunetto) and S Magnet (Sマグネット, Esu Magunetto) Switches, that grants magnokinesis. In this form, he is equipped with the shoulder-mounted N Magnet Cannon (Ｎマグネットキャノン, Enu Magunetto Kyanon) and S Magnet Cannon (Ｓマグネットキャノン, Esu Magunetto Kyanon) railguns, which he can detach from his armor and combine to form the NS-Magnet Cannon (NSマグネットキャノン, Enu Esu Magunetto Kyanon) drone for combat assistance. However, using this form restricts Gentaro's mobility. His Limit Breaks in this form are the Rider Super Electromagnetic Bomber (ライダー超電磁ボンバー, Raidā Chō Denji Bonbā) via the NS-Magnet Cannon and the Rider Super Electromagnetic Tackle (ライダー超電磁タックル, Raidā Chō Denji Takkuru) via the N and S Magnet Cannons.
- Cosmic States (コズミックステイツ, Kozumikku Suteitsu): Gentaro's final form accessed from the detonator-like Cosmic (コズミック, Kozumikku) Switch that grants the combined powers of all 40 numbered Astroswitches. In this form, he wields the Barizun Sword (バリズンソード, Barizun Sōdo), which has a club-like Boost Mode (ブーストモード, Būsuto Mōdo) for performing a Limit Break that creates warp drives and a bladed Slash Mode (スラッシュモード, Surasshu Mōdo) for performing the Rider Super Galaxy Finish (ライダー超銀河フィニッシュ, Raidā Chō Ginga Finisshu) Limit Break. However, the Cosmic Switch can only function if Gentaro maintains his friendships with every member of the Kamen Rider Club, as he will lose access to this form if even one friendship is in turmoil. His Limit Break in this form is the Rider Kick (ライダーキック, Raidā Kikku).

Additionally, Gentaro can use unique Astroswitches to achieve States that appear in supplemental media connected to the series, which are as follows:

- Rocket States (ロケットステイツ, Roketto Suteitsu): The orange-colored evolved form of Base States accessed from the Rocket Switch Super-1 (ロケットスイッチスーパーワン, Roketto Suitchi Sūpā Wan) that equips Gentaro with a pair of Rocket Modules. His Limit Breaks in this form are the Rider Tailspin Crusher (ライダーきりもみクラッシャー, Raidā Kirimomi Kurasshā) via the Rocket Modules and the Rider Double Rocket Drill Kick (ライダーダブルロケットドリルキック, Raidā Daburu Roketto Doriru Kikku) via the Drill Module. During the events of the crossover film Kamen Rider × Super Sentai: Super Hero Taisen, Gentaro uses the Rocket Switch Super-1 and the Drill Switch Super-3 (ドリルスイッチスーパースリー, Doriru Suitchi Sūpā Surī) to equip the Go-Busters' giant robot Go-BusterOh with a pair of Rocket and Drill Modules respectively, allowing it to perform the Sentai Rider Space Kick (戦隊ライダー宇宙キック, Sentai Raidā Uchū Kikku) finisher. This form first appears in the crossover film Kamen Rider × Kamen Rider Fourze & OOO: Movie War Mega Max.
- Rocket Drill States (ロケットドリルステイツ, Roketto Doriru Suteitsu): A special form accessed from the Clear Drill (クリアドリル, Kuria Doriru) Switch that equips Gentaro with the right forearm-mounted Rocket Drill Module (ロケットドリルモジュール, Rokketto Doriru Mojūru). His Limit Break in this form is the Rider Rocket Drill Blast (ライダーロケットドリルブラス, Raidā Roketto Doriru Burasuto). This form appears exclusively in the Hyper Battle DVD special Kamen Rider Fourze Hyper Battle DVD: Rocket Drill States of Friendship.
- Meteor Fusion States (メテオフュージョンステイツ, Meteo Fyūjon Suteitsu): A special form accessed from the Fusion (フュージョン, Fyūjon) and Meteor Switches that allows Gentaro to use his and Kamen Rider Meteor's powers and weapons at once. His Limit Break in this form is the Rider Fusion Drill Kick (ライダーフュージョンドリルキック, Raidā Fyūjon Doriru Kikku) via the Drill Module. This form appears exclusively in the film Kamen Rider Fourze the Movie: Space, Here We Come!
  - Meteor Nadeshiko Fusion States (メテオなでしこフュージョンステイツ, Meteo Nadeshiko Fyūjon Suteitsu): The evolved form of Meteor Fusion States accessed from the Fusion, Meteor, and Nadeshiko (なでしこ) Switches that equips Gentaro with a pair of Rocket Modules, which allow him to perform the Rider (Double) Rocket Missile (ライダー（ダブル）ロケットミサイル, Raidā (Daburu) Roketto Misairu) attack, and a pair of Hovering Lifter (ホバリングリフター, Hobaringu Rifutā) skis. His Limit Break in this form is the Rider Ultimate Crusher (ライダーアルティメットクラッシャー, Raidā Arutimetto Kurasshā). This form appears exclusively in the crossover film Kamen Rider × Kamen Rider Wizard & Fourze: Movie War Ultimatum.
- Launcher States (ランチャーステイツ, Ranchā Suteitsu): The blue-colored evolved form of Base States accessed from the Launcher Switch Super-2 (ランチャースイッチスーパーツー, Ranchā Suitchi Sūpā Tsū) that equips Gentaro with a pair of shin-mounted Launcher Modules (ランチャーモジュール, Ranchā Mojūru). This form appears exclusively in the tie-in novel Kamen Rider Fourze: Ama High Grad-Uation.

Gentaro Kisaragi is portrayed by Sota Fukushi (福士 蒼汰, Fukushi Sōta). As a child, Gentaro is portrayed by Tatsuki Ishikawa (石川 樹, Ishikawa Tatsuki).

=== Kengo Utahoshi ===
Kengo Utahoshi (歌星 賢吾, Utahoshi Kengo) (Note: Kengo is named after Kamen Rider 1, also known as Takeshi Hongo (本郷 猛, Hongō Takeshi); うたほしけんご（歌星賢吾） is an anagram of ほんごうたけし（本郷猛）.) is a second-year, later third-year, student and Gentaro's level-headed and intelligent partner as well as the Core Child (コアチャイルド, Koa Chairudo), a physical construct made of Cosmic Energy that his adoptive father Rokuro created from the Core Switch that the alien "Presenters" sent to Earth to test humanity's ability to contact them, though Kengo was unaware of his true nature for most of his life. After losing Rokuro the day he was born and a year before the series, Kengo discovered the Fourze System, Rabbit Hatch, and the Zodiarts' existence and took on his father's mission to fight the monsters. Due to his weak physical constitution however, which he believed was a medical condition, Kengo is unable to properly utilize Rokuro's equipment and is forced to let Gentaro take his place while he serves as a tactician. Due to his desire to uphold his father's legacy, Kengo initially refuses to acknowledge the Kamen Rider Club, though he eventually warms up to them and Gentaro.

During his third year at AGHS, Kengo discovers the truth of Rokuro's death and realizes his nature as the Core Child. He uses his powers to foil Mitsuaki Gamou's plans to see the Presenters by destroying AGHS before intending to leave Earth and return to the Presenters himself with what he has learned about humanity. However, a vengeful Gamou destroys the Core Switch, causing the youth's body to dissolve into light particles. Following his final battle with Gentaro, Gamou revives Kengo as a human, leading to the latter staying on Earth with his friends.

Five years later, as of the events of the film Kamen Rider × Kamen Rider Wizard & Fourze: Movie War Ultimatum, Kengo became a scientist working to continue Rokuro and Gamou's dream of seeing the Presenters.

Kengo Utahoshi is portrayed by Ryuki Takahashi (高橋 龍輝, Takahashi Ryūki).

=== Yuki Jojima ===
Yuki Jojima (城島 ユウキ, Jōjima Yūki) (Note: Yuki is named after Riderman, also known as Joji Yuki (結城 丈二, Yūki Jōji).) is a bright and cheerful second-year, later third-year, student and Gentaro's childhood friend who cares deeply for her friends. After hearing a voice from the stars as a child, she became obsessed with becoming an astronaut and went on to become a self-proclaimed "space otaku" in the present. After meeting Kengo on the day he found the Rabbit Hatch, Yuki supports him in his endeavors and convinces him to let Gentaro join them, becoming the founding members of the Kamen Rider Club in the process. During her third year, Yuki becomes the Kamen Rider Club's new president after Miu graduates, using her ingenuity to lead her friends in their battles against the Zodiarts.

Five years later, as of the events of the film Kamen Rider × Kamen Rider Wizard & Fourze: Movie War Ultimatum, Yuki fulfilled her dream of becoming an astronaut.

Yuki Jojima is portrayed by Fumika Shimizu (清水 富美加, Shimizu Fumika). As a child, Yuki is portrayed by Kanon Kasuga (春日 香音, Kasuga Kanon).

=== Miu Kazashiro ===
Miu Kazashiro (風城 美羽, Kazashiro Miu), (Note: Miu is named after Kamen Rider V3, also known as Shiro Kazami (風見 志郎, Kazami Shirō).) a level-headed yet cocky third-year (later undergraduate) student, comes from an upper-class family, and becomes head cheerleader of AGHS, and "Queen of the School" (学園の女王, Gakuen no Joō) two years running, a title she earned in the Queen Festival (クイーンフェス, Kuīn Fesu) through effort and hard work. Among her philosophies as queen, she believes that she needs to know everything that occurs within the campus grounds and that one can only truly shine under their own power. Though she is well-loved by many at school, she displays a superiority complex over her classmates and sees those who are infatuated with her as sycophants who leech onto her for their own failure to shine. This mentality initially leads to her clashing with Gentaro. When her fellow cheerleader Tamae Sakuma humiliates her and reveals the negative aspects of her personality in front of their classmates in an attempt become the new queen, however, a humbled Miu is reminded of her passion and returns to compete in the Festival despite the odds being against her. After winning a third time, she accepts Gentaro's friendship and joins the Kamen Rider Club, using her natural leadership skills to become its president and working with Kengo to coordinate group efforts. Over time, she becomes more caring of others and willing to step in herself if necessary. Following her graduation, Miu names Yuki as the new president, while the former becomes the club's chairwoman as her chosen college is close to AGHS.

Five years later, as of the events of Kamen Rider × Kamen Rider Wizard & Fourze: Movie War Ultimatum, Miu has become a successful model.

Miu Kazashiro is portrayed by Rikako Sakata (坂田 梨香子, Sakata Rikako).

=== JK ===
Kaizo Jingu (神宮 海蔵, Jingū Kaizō), (Note: JK is named after Kamen Rider X, also known as Keisuke Jin (神 敬介, Jin Keisuke). Additionally, JK's real name is a play on Kamen Rider X being a "Kaizorg" (カイゾーグ, Kaizōgu).) better known as "JK" (JK（ジェイク）, Jeiku; pronounced "Jake"), is a cowardly first-year, later second-year, AGHS student with a gaudy appearance who serves as an information broker, trading secrets for favors. In his youth, he dreamed of becoming a rock star like his father, Keizo, and formed a rock band with his friend Tojiro Goto, only to give up the dream upon realizing he cannot sing. After learning of Gentaro's identity as Kamen Rider Fourze, JK agrees to keep the former's secret in exchange for protection from Fumihiro Nitta, a student the latter had wronged, while secretly intending to steal one of Gentaro's Astroswitches in an attempt to teach him a lesson about trust. However, JK is captured by Nitta, rescued by Gentaro, and learns the true meaning of friendship before joining the Kamen Rider Club, using his connections to aid the group in identifying Switchers, Zodiarts, and their targets.

Following Miu and Shun's graduation, JK becomes the Powerdizer's secondary pilot and sets up an internet radio show called DJ Gene Milky Night Carnival under the alias "DJ Gene" as a means of living out his childhood dream. When Goto returns as a Zodiarts and uses his powers to increase the show's popularity, JK finds himself conflicted by his loyalties to the Kamen Rider Club and refusal to give up on his dreams like his father had. Upon discovering Goto was brainwashing people, JK ends DJ Gene Milky Night Carnival in favor of cherishing his friendships.

Five years later, as of the events of the crossover film Kamen Rider × Kamen Rider Wizard & Fourze: Movie War Ultimatum, JK has become a journalist.

JK is portrayed by Shion Tsuchiya (土屋 シオン, Tsuchiya Shion). As a child, JK is portrayed by Wataru Sekine (関根 航, Sekine Wataru).

=== Shun Daimonji ===
Shun Daimonji (大文字 隼, Daimonji Shun) (Note: Shun is named after Kamen Rider 2, also known as Hayato Ichimonji (一文字 隼人, Ichimonji Hayato). The kanji 大 in Daimonji's name is a combination of the kanji 一 and 人 in Ichimonji's name.) is a third-year, later undergraduate, student, a stereotypical jock, and captain of the American football team who is treated like a king by the student body. Due to his life being planned out by his father, Takato, Shun was raised to believe that those beneath him are trash and that he should manipulate them to suit his needs. Additionally, he distances himself from anything that could potentially ruin his reputation for fear of shaming his father and their family name and paired himself up with Miu, the "queen" of AGHS. After a series of events lead to him receiving detention with Gentaro and the Kamen Rider Club, Shun reveals his history to them, how he is not truly happy with who he is or what he achieved, and that he considers himself an outcast due to his holier-than-thou attitude. Respecting his wishes, Gentaro inspires Shun to do what he truly wants while making his father happy, which subsequently leads to the latter joining the Kamen Rider Club as Gentaro's ally in combat via the Powerdizer. Over time, Shun slowly becomes more humble and friendly, though he experiences discomfort and guilt in response to others following his previous example and works to atone for his past misdeeds.

Five years later, as of the events of the film Kamen Rider × Kamen Rider Wizard & Fourze: Movie War Ultimatum, Shun has become a professional American football player and rekindled his relationship with Miu.

With his athletic prowess, Shun is capable of piloting the Powerdizer (パワーダイザー, Pawādaizā), a special OSTO exo-suit that requires an incredible amount of exertion to operate and possesses missile batteries, a rover-like Vehicle Mode (ビークルモード, Bīkuru Mōdo), and a launch pad-like Tower Mode (タワーモード, Tawā Mōdo).

Shun Daimonji is portrayed by Justin Tomimori (冨森 ジャスティン, Tomimori Jasutin).

=== Tomoko Nozama ===
Tomoko Nozama (野座間 友子, Nozama Tomoko) (Note: Tomoko is named after Kamen Rider Amazon, also known as Amazon (アマゾン).) is a spiritual first-year, later second-year, goth girl with an unorthodox sense of thinking, an acute sixth sense, and uncanny stealth. After joining other goth students in forming a coven while in pursuit of her dream of living on the moon, only to learn they are fake, she nearly becomes a Zodiarts until Gentaro brings her to the moon via the Rabbit Hatch. Despite being disappointed by the coldness of space, Tomoko finds comfort and acceptance in the Kamen Rider Club, joining them and providing assistance with her ability to detect things others overlook.

Five years later, as of the events of the film Kamen Rider × Kamen Rider Wizard & Fourze: Movie War Ultimatum, Tomoko has become a best-selling novelist.

Tomoko Nozama is portrayed by Shiho (志保).

=== Ryusei Sakuta ===
Ryusei Sakuta (朔田 流星, Sakuta Ryūsei) is a mysterious transfer student from Subaruboshi High School (昴星高校, Subaruboshi Kōkō), (Note: Subaruboshi (昴星) is the Japanese name of the Chinese constellation, the Hairy Head, which corresponds to the Pleiades.) and a former member of the Anti-Zodiarts Union (反ゾディアーツ同盟, Han Zodiātsu Dōmei) After his friend Jiro Iseki used a Zodiarts Switch that put him in a coma, Ryusei never forgave himself and vowed to never make friends again before receiving the means to become Kamen Rider Meteor (仮面ライダーメテオ, Kamen Raidā Meteo) and the task of locating the Aries Zodiarts from Tachibana.

Due to his search taking him to AGHS, Ryusei puts on a timid demeanor to infiltrate the Kamen Rider Club and secretly report on their activities for Tachibana while assuming his true aggressive nature as Meteor. Despite helping the Kamen Rider Club develop new technology for Fourze, Ryusei is manipulated by Aries into nearly killing Fourze in exchange for Aries reviving Jiro. While Ryusei's identity is exposed in the process and Aries upholds his promise, Jiro's worsening condition causes Ryusei to risk his life protecting the Kamen Rider Club, who forgive him and agree to keep his identity secret. Following the Zodiarts' defeat, Ryusei returns to Subaruboshi High.

Five years later, as of the events of the film Kamen Rider × Kamen Rider Wizard & Fourze: Movie War Ultimatum, Ryusei became an Interpol agent alongside Inga Blink.

On his own, Ryusei is a proficient martial artist and practitioner of Jeet Kune Do and the fictional Seishin Dairin Fist (星心大輪拳, Seishin Dairinken; Star-Mind Large-Ring Fist). (Note: The "Seishin Dairin Fist" is an homage to the fictional Sincere Shaolin Fist (赤心少林拳, Sekishin Shōrinken) from Kamen Rider Super-1.)

Utilizing the Meteor (メテオ, Meteo) Switch in conjunction with the Meteor Driver (メテオドライバー, Meteo Doraibā) belt, which is powered by Cosmic Energy supplied from the M-BUS (エムバス, Emubasu; Meteor Back-Up Satellite) satellite, Ryusei can transform into Kamen Rider Meteor. While transformed, he is equipped with the Meteor Galaxy (メテオギャラクシー, Meteo Gyarakushī) bracelet, which grants abilities based on Mars, Jupiter, and Saturn. His Limit Breaks are the Meteor Strike (メテオストライク, Meteo Sutoraiku) and the Meteor Tornado (メテオトルネード, Meteo Torunēdo) via the Meteor Driver and the Starlight Shower (スターライトシャワー, Sutāraito Shawā) via the Meteor Galaxy. His personal vehicle is the Machine Meteorstar (マシンメテオスター, Mashin Meteosutā) motorcycle.

Later in the series, Ryusei acquires the Meteor Storm (メテオストーム, Meteo Sutōmu) Switch, which allows him to transform into his final form; Kamen Rider Meteor Storm (仮面ライダーメテオストーム, Kamen Raidā Meteo Sutōmu). While transformed, he wields the Meteor Storm Shaft (メテオストームシャフト, Meteo Sutōmu Shafuto) gun. His Limit Breaks in this form are the Meteor Storm Strike (メテオストームストライク, Meteo Sutōmu Sutoraiku) via the Meteor Driver and the (Max Power) Meteor Storm Punisher ((マックスパワー) メテオストームパニッシャー, (Makkusu Pawā) Meteo Sutōmu Panisshā) via the Meteor Storm Shaft.

Ryusei Sakuta is portrayed by Ryo Yoshizawa (吉沢 亮, Yoshizawa Ryō).

== Recurring characters ==
=== Rokuro Utahoshi ===
Rokuro Utahoshi (歌星 緑郎, Utahoshi Rokurō) is Kengo's father who worked for the OSTO at their moonbase, which would later become the Rabbit Hatch. While studying Cosmic Energy with Mitsuaki Gamou and Kuniteru Emoto, Rokuro reverse-engineered the Fourze System from the Core Switch in the hopes that the finalized versions would be made for future generations after his death. Seventeen years before the series, Gamou tasked Emoto with getting the Zodiarts Switches from the OSTO moonbase to Earth. In the process, the latter abandoned Rokuro on the moon. Before he died, Rokuro left an inscription explaining the legacy he meant to leave behind with the Fourze System.

Rokuro Utahoshi is portrayed by Toru Kazama (風間 トオル, Kazama Tōru).

=== Chuta Ohsugi ===
Chuta Ohsugi (大杉 忠太, Ōsugi Chūta) is a middle-aged, superstitious, and cowardly second year geography teacher, later third-year homeroom teacher, with a habit of punctuating his sentences by snapping his suspenders, which he always wears. Despite being disliked by several AGHS students and his belief that teachers should not be friends with them, he also believes that teachers should protect their students.

After becoming the Kamen Rider Club's homeroom teacher, Ohsugi makes it his mission to catch them committing misdeeds. This would lead to him discovering the Rabbit Hatch and their battle against the Zodiarts. In spite of their pleas, he intends to disband the club for varying reasons until he learns his fellow faculty members are involved in Zodiarts attacks and the Kamen Rider Club save him from one such monster. Following these, he agrees to give the club faculty approval, reconciles with them, and becomes their academic adviser. By the end of the series, his respect for the group and bravery have grown to the point where he is willing to put himself in danger to stop the Leo Zodiarts from harming the Kamen Rider Club.

Chuta Ohsugi is portrayed by Takushi Tanaka (田中 卓志, Tanaka Takushi) of Ungirls.

=== Zodiarts ===
The Zodiarts (ゾディアーツ, Zodiātsu) are humans, or Switchers (スイッチャー, Suitchā), who utilize black-colored Zodiarts Switches (ゾディアーツスイッチ, Zodiātsu Suitchi) to convert Cosmic Energy and that of their negative emotions into monstrous, constellation-themed construct bodies. If they use their Switch often enough, the Switch will gather energy until it transforms into its "Last One" phase. If the Switcher uses it at this point, their mind will be transferred from their human body to their Zodiarts form, which can potentially evolve into one of the Horoscopes (ホロスコープス, Horosukōpusu) if they unlock their Resurrection Star (最輝星, Saikisei) and absorb their human body. The Horoscopes, alternatively known as the Twelve Constellations of the Zodiac (黄道十二星座, Kōdō Jū-Ni Seiza), possess varying Supernova (超新星, Chōshinsei) abilities and red Horoscope Switches, can create Stardust Ninja Dustards (星屑忍者ダスタード, Hoshikuzu Ninja Dasutādo) to serve as foot soldiers, and assume themselves to be chosen by the universe to become superior beings.

Similarly to the Fourze System, the Zodiarts Switches were reverse-engineered by Mitsuaki Gamou from a Core Switch sent by the Presenters (プレゼンター, Purezentā), a mysterious alien race that sends Core Switches to various worlds to enable the planet's dominant race to contact them. Gamou created the Zodiarts and Horoscopes to withstand the rigors of transwarp travel and generate negative Cosmic Energy to convert an atmospheric vortex above AGHS known as "The Hole" (ザ・ホール, Za Hōru) into an extra-dimensional labyrinth called the Dark Nebula (ダークネビュラ, Dāku Nebyura) so he can reach the Presenters. After learning the Dark Nebula would also destroy AGHS and the city, the Kamen Rider Club eventually succeed in stopping Gamou.

==== Mitsuaki Gamou ====
Mitsuaki Gamou (我望 光明, Gamō Mitsuaki), initially credited as the "red-eyed man" (赤い目の男, akai me no otoko), is AGHS' egocentric and charismatic school board chairman who often uses space metaphors in his speech. Despite his charming personality, he lacks friends as he views the concept as beneath him. As a child, Gamou heard the Presenters' call around the time of the Apollo 11 exploration, motivating him to join NASA, the Russian Federal Space Agency, and the OSTO in an attempt to meet them. Twenty years prior to the series, while working for OSTO, Gamou found the Presenters' Core Switch alongside Rokuro Utahoshi on the moon. The pair cracked the Switch's puzzle, but clashed over how to contact the Presenters, with Gamou seeing Rokuro's Fourze System as a time-consuming dead end before he went on to develop the Zodiarts Switches. Three years after finding the Core Switch, Gamou tasked Kuniteru Emoto with getting the Zodiarts Switches from OSTO's lunar station and murdering Rokuro, though Emoto abandoned Rokuro on the moon instead. A decade prior to the series, Gamou received funding from Foundation X to build AGHS directly under "The Hole" ostensibly in order to foster a love of space exploration in future generations while secretly utilizing the school to create and raise Zodiarts to gather the Horoscopes for the day he meets the Presenters, which he refers to as the Day of Awakening (覚醒の日, Kakusei no Hi). To this end, he became one of the first Horoscopes, the Sagittarius Zodiarts (サジタリウス・ゾディアーツ, Sajitariusu Zodiātsu).

Throughout the first half of the series, Gamou secretly uses AGHS to encourage the students to pursue individuality and whatever they please in the hopes that they can evolve and become Horoscopes. Additionally, he orders his subordinates not to eliminate Kamen Riders Fourze and Meteor as they provide an additional factor towards his Zodiarts' evolution. After Emoto reveals his true colors and aids the Riders however, Gamou reveals himself to the pair and searches for the Core Switch. When Rokuro's son Kengo thwarts his Day of Awakening, Gamou destroys the Core Switch to kill Kengo before renewing his plans, only for Fourze to defeat him. Gamou accepts the Rider's ideals and friendship, but begins to evaporate into stardust due to years of working directly with Cosmic Energy. Before he dies, he asks the Kamen Rider Club to meet the Presenters in his stead before using the Aquarius Zodiarts' powers to repair the Core Switch and resurrect Kengo.

Due to years of saturating himself with high levels of negative Cosmic Energy, Gamou gained supernatural abilities in his human form, such as the ability to grant his fellow Horoscopes their Supernova powers and place hypnotic suggestions in people. As the Sagittarius Zodiarts, Gamou possesses durable armor and can generate the Gilgamesh (ギルガメッシュ, Girugamesshu) bow on his left arm, which can fire a barrage of Cosmic Energy arrows. His Supernova ability allows him to transform into Sagittarius Nova (サジタリウス・ノヴァ, Sajitariusu Nova), gaining increased agility, the ability to fire arrows directly from his left hand without Gilgamesh, and augment his attacks with negative Cosmic Energy. Similarly to Kou Tatsugami, Gamou can also utilize other Horoscope Switches.

Mitsuaki Gamou (Note: The kanji that comprise Gamou's given name can be translated as "bright light" (光明, kōmei), one of several epithets of the Greek sun god Apollo, who like Sagittarius is associated with bow and arrows.) is portrayed by Shingo Tsurumi (鶴見 辰吾, Tsurumi Shingo). As a child, Gamou is portrayed by Musashi Takahata (高旗 武蔵, Takahata Musashi).

==== Sarina Sonoda ====
Sarina Sonoda (園田 紗里奈, Sonoda Sarina) is the youthful and beautiful AGHS homeroom teacher of class 2-B who teaches classical literature and serves as Mitsuaki Gamou's loyal right hand after Principal Hayami recruited her while she was an AGHS student. Secretly using her pleasant facade to befriend students and find ideal Horoscope candidates as the Scorpion Zodiarts (スコーピオン・ゾディアーツ, Sukōpion Zodiātsu), she initially works from the shadows, distributing Zodiarts Switches to vengeful students, before fighting Fourze to stop him from interfering with her targets and Gamou's plans. After being defeated by Fourze and Meteor despite attaining her Supernova powers and maintaining her secret identity however, Kuniteru Emoto seemingly banishes Sonoda to the Dark Nebula for her failure while Gamou acquires her Horoscope Switch and covers up her disappearance as a sabbatical, later resignation, for health reasons. It is later revealed that she was placed in suspended animation on the M-BUS.

As of the tie-in novel Kamen Rider Fourze: Ama High Grad-Uation, Sonoda is safely returned to Earth, where the Kamen Rider Club discover her connection to the Zodiarts. Additionally, it is also revealed that she had a childhood friend, Tsubasa Amano, who was killed in an accident following an argument they had. As a result, she blamed herself for it and developed a split personality based on him. While she was able to suppress it, the personality influenced her actions as the Scorpion Zodiarts and inspired Tsubasa, an alien that took on Sonoda's appearance and split personality. After Fourze defeats Tsubasa and the Kamen Rider Club help her come to terms with the latter, Sonoda surrenders herself to the police and is allowed to return to AGHS once she completes her sentence.

As the Scorpion Zodiarts, Sonoda utilizes a kick-based fighting style and possesses a pair of clawed gauntlets, a scorpion tail-like ponytail that doubles as a whip, and the ability to envenom targets. Her Supernova ability allows her to transform into Scorpion Nova (スコーピオン・ノヴァ, Sukōpion Nova), gaining a scorpion man-like form that grants monstrous strength and the ability to store enough energy to destroy a city.

Sarina Sonoda (Note: An anagram of her name Sonoda Sarina (そのださりな) is the phrase Sasori na no da (さそりなのだ, "I am the scorpion").) is portrayed by Yuka Konan (虎南 有香, Konan Yuka) while the Scorpion Zodiarts is voiced by Eiji Takemoto (竹本 英史, Takemoto Eiji).

==== Kouhei Hayami ====
Kouhei Hayami (速水 公平, Hayami Kōhei) is the attractive and charming yet shrewd and inquisitive principal of AGHS who most everyone falls for and displays undying loyalty to Mitsuaki Gamou. True to his nature as the Libra Zodiarts (リブラ・ゾディアーツ, Ribura Zodiātsu), Hayami has a habit of using terms related to weight when talking to others. Following Sonoda's banishment, Gamou tasks Hayami with continuing her task of distributing Zodiarts Switches and accelerate their efforts to find the remaining Horoscopes, which the latter reluctantly agrees to by targeting his prized pupils while staying out of combat as much as possible.

After negating a version of "The Hole" over Kyoto to ensure only "The Hole" over AGHS can gather Cosmic Energy, Hayami learns Gamou intends to eliminate him now that his usefulness has ended. The former's desperation over staying with Gamou causes Hayami to manifest his Supernova ability, the Eye of Laplace (ラプラスの瞳, Rapurasu no Hitomi), which allows him to directly identify people who can evolve into Horoscopes by viewing their "Fate of the Stars" (星の運命, Hoshi no Sadame). Due to this new development, Gamou allows Hayami to stay until the Horoscopes have been found. However, Hayami slowly begins to question Gamou's goals and his place in it and considers betraying him. Nevertheless, Hayami ultimately chooses to remain by Gamou's side and sacrifices himself to save the latter from Kamen Rider Fourze. Before he is vaporized by "The Hole's" lightning, Hayami dies satisfied with his actions.

As the Libra Zodiarts, Hayami wields the Dikē (ディケ, Dike) khakkhara, which can cast illusions. As stated above, his Supernova ability allows him to identify Horoscopes, current and future.

Kouhei Hayami (Note: His given name Kōhei (公平) is also the Japanese word for "fairness", "impartial", and "justice", referencing the constellation of Libra representing the scales of Astraea, the Greek goddess of justice.) is portrayed by Kousei Amano (天野 浩成, Amano Kōsei).

==== Kuniteru Emoto ====
Kuniteru Emoto (江本 州輝, Emoto Kuniteru) is an associate of Mitsuaki Gamou and Rokuro Utahoshi who worked as a research associate and studied Cosmic Energy with them at OSTO twenty years prior to the series. Out of jealousy towards Rokuro, who Emoto saw as the Earth to Gamou's sun and his moon, reflecting the sun's light while paling in comparison to them, Emoto formed a partnership with Gamou, stole the Zodiarts Switches from OSTO for him, and abandoned Utahoshi on the moon. However, Emoto came to regret his actions and vowed to take Rokuro's place as the Earth in their relationship to Gamou by subverting the latter's agenda. In pursuit of this, Emoto became the Virgo Zodiarts (ヴァルゴ・ゾディアーツ, Varugo Zodiātsu) to seemingly serve as Gamou's judge and executioner within the Horoscopes' ranks while secretly sending potential victims to the M-BUS for their own protection, assume the identity of the masked "Tachibana" (タチバナ) to secretly gain Kamen Rider Meteor and Rokuro's son Kengo's help, and utilize his occupation as a Kyoto Space University (宇宙京都大学, Uchū Kyōto Daigaku) professor to study a version of The Hole above Kyoto; using his Zodiarts form's teleportation powers to maintain all of his plans and identities.

After Gamou orders Kouhei Hayami to negate The Hole in Kyoto, Emoto transfers to Miraikan to become the Kamen Rider Club's instructor and use his Tachibana identity to train Fourze in using ruthlessness instead of friendship to get what he wants. When Tomoko discovers his identity, Emoto sends her to the M-BUS to conceal his secret before intimidating the other Kamen Rider Club members into leaving Fourze. However, Kengo's ingenuity and Hayami's powers lead to Emoto's secrets being revealed to the Zodiarts and Kamen Rider Club. Upon seeing Fourze's friends stand by him despite what he did, Emoto befriends Fourze and brings Tomoka back, but is mortally wounded by Gamou and killed by Kou Tatsugami for his betrayal. Before he dies, Emoto reveals the truth of what happened to Utahoshi to Kengo, begs him to stop Gamou, and leaves behind a flash drive for Kengo detailing his history and Gamou's Day of Awakening.

As of the tie-in novel Kamen Rider Fourze: Ama High Grad-Uation, Fourze safely returns everyone that Emoto sent to the M-BUS to Earth.

As the Virgo Zodiarts, Emoto wields the Rhodia (ロディア, Rodia) halberd, can produce formidable barriers, fire black hole-like orbs, and conjure portals to send targets to other locations.

Kuniteru Emoto (Note: His surname Emoto (江本), when Romanized is the Japanese word Otome (乙女, Virgin), read backwards. Additionally, the kanji that make up his given name Kuniteru (州輝) can be read as Supika (スピカ, "Spica"), which is a combination of su, an alternate reading of kuni (州), and pika, a Japanese onomatopoeia for the word kagayaku (輝く, "to shine") As "Tachibana", Emoto took his name from Tōbei Tachibana (立花 藤兵衛, Tachibana Tōbee), who aided the first seven Kamen Riders.) is portrayed by Hajime Yamazaki (山崎 一, Yamazaki Hajime) while the Virgo Zodiarts is voiced by Rie Tanaka (田中 理恵, Tanaka Rie), who also voices Shun Daimonji's mother, and Tachibana is voiced by Nobuyuki Hiyama (檜山 修之, Hiyama Nobuyuki), who also serves as the series' narrator.

==== Kou Tatsugami ====
Kou Tatsugami (立神 吼, Tatsugami Kō) is a skilled martial artist who originally took part in street fights as he had little to live for until he met and was bested by Mitsuaki Gamou, after which the former became fanatically loyal to him, serving as his personal aide and bodyguard. After helping Gamou achieve his goals and fighting Kamen Riders Fourze and Meteor as the Leo Zodiarts (レオ・ゾディアーツ, Reo Zodiātsu) on several occasions, Tatsugami is eventually defeated by Meteor and evaporates into stardust.

On his own, Tatsugami is an adept hand-to-hand combatant. As the Leo Zodiarts, he possesses a pair of clawed gauntlets, a roar-based shockwave attack, superhuman speed, incredible durability, and the ability to produce personal kabuki-themed versions of the Dustards called Leo Dustards (レオ・ダスタード, Reo Dasutādo), which dual wield a pair of Duswords. Like Gamou, Tatsugami also possesses a unique physiology that allows him to use the other Horoscopes' Switches.

Kou Tatsugami (Note: An alternate reading of his surname Tatsugami (立神) is tategami (鬣, "mane"). The kanji used in his given name Kō (吼) is one of the kanji used for the Japanese word hoeru (吼える, "to roar").) is portrayed by Kazutoshi Yokoyama (横山 一敏, Yokoyama Kazutoshi).

==== Natsuji Kijima ====
Natsuji Kijima (鬼島 夏児, Kijima Natsuji) is an arrogant second-year student with a sharp tongue who displays hostility towards anyone who irritates him. Originally the president of the AGHS rakugo club, Kijima found a Zodiarts Switch that Kouhei Hayami dropped and becomes the Pegasus Zodiarts (ペガサス・ゾディアーツ, Pegasasu Zodiātsu), acquiring a taste for power. Using his Zodiarts form and partially for fun, Kijima seeks revenge on teacher Haruka Utsugi for taking his rakugo fan by attacking martial artists and mimicking her fighting style to frame her as the Pegasus Zodiarts. Despite the Kamen Rider Club deducing the truth and defeating Kijima, Kuniteru Emoto ensures he evolves into the Cancer Zodiarts (キャンサー・ゾディアーツ, Kyansā Zodiātsu).

Quickly winning Mitsuaki Gamou's favor, Kijima tactlessly flaunts his increased power, challenges Kamen Riders Fourze and Meteor constantly, and belittles Hayami for not treating him as an equal. After learning Meteor's identity, Kijima tortures the Rider in increasingly twisted ways and quickly gains his Supernova abilities. However, Meteor acquires new powers of his own and defeats Kijima. The latter goes to Hayami for help, but the principal uses his illusionary powers to disguise Kijima as a meddling detective and convince Emoto to send him to the Dark Nebula. Taking possession of Kijima's Horoscope Switch for Gamou, Hayami later claims Kijima died in battle while Kijima himself was secretly placed in suspended animation within the M-BUS.

As of the tie-in novel Kamen Rider Fourze: Ama High Grad-Uation, Kijima is safely returned to Earth.

As the Pegasus Zodiarts, Kijima possesses increased offensive capabilities and the ability to generate horseshoe-shaped energy blasts. As the Cancer Zodiarts, he possesses an impregnable carapace capable of withstanding most Limit Breaks, sharp pincers on his left forearm capable of slicing any material, the ability to liquefy himself, and the ability to remove people's life forces and place them in comas. His Supernova ability allows him to transform into Cancer Nova (キャンサー・ノヴァ, Kyansā Nova), taking on a more monstrous form that possesses incredible strength, an even more impregnable carapace, and the ability to store enough energy to destroy a city.

Natsuji Kijima (Note: The kanji that make up his given name Natsuji (夏児) can also be read in the on'yomi method as kani (かに, crab).) is portrayed by Soran Tamoto (タモト 清嵐, Tamoto Soran).

==== Ran Kuroki ====
Ran Kuroki (黒木 蘭, Kuroki Ran) is a first-year student at AGHS who is proficient in swimming and aikido. Though Gentaro tries to befriend her and her best friend Haru Kusao, she rejects his friendship outright due to an incident with senior students from her old middle school that convinced her to not trust students older than her and to protect Haru. However, her ideals lead to Haru becoming a Zodiarts because he felt she was smothering him. After receiving help from Gentaro in bringing Haru back to his senses, Ran apologizes to everyone involved and becomes a provisional member of the Kamen Rider Club until Haru fully recovers.

Upon discovering she is the Pisces Zodiarts (ピスケス・ゾディアーツ, Pisukesu Zodiātsu), Kouhei Hayami attempts to delay the recruitment process until Kou Tatsugami brutalizes him to force Ran into activating her Zodiarts Switch and save the principal. Despite her Switch temporarily turning an immature blue instead of the Horoscopes' usual red, Tatsugami's plan eventually works and he steals the complete Pisces Switch from Ran, who is temporarily hospitalized following an attempt to fight Tatsugami without her powers. As of the series finale, Ran and Haru become full members of the Kamen Rider Club.

As the Pisces Zodiarts, Ran can liquefy herself, swim through solid surfaces, and shoot high pressure water streams. Additionally, a clone of the Zodiarts seen in the film Kamen Rider Fourze the Movie: Space, Here We Come! wields a double-headed, trident-like weapon.

Ran Kuroki (Note: Her name literally translated means "unbarked lumber" (黒木, kuroki) and "orchid" (蘭, ran), the initials of which make up the Japanese word uo (魚, "fish").) is portrayed by Rin Honoka (ほのか りん, Honoka Rin).

==== Minor Zodiarts ====
- Tamae Sakuma (佐久間 珠恵, Sakuma Tamae): A third year AGHS student and member of the cheerleading squad. Desiring to win the Queen Festival instead of constantly losing to Miu, Sakuma feigns friendship with her before using a Zodiarts Switch to transform into the Chameleon Zodiarts (カメレオン・ゾディアーツ, Kamereon Zodiātsu), gaining an extendable tongue and invisibility in the process, to sabotage Miu's chances of winning. However, Kamen Rider Fourze defeats Sakuma while Miu wins the festival once more. Following this, Sakuma makes minor reappearances throughout the series. Tamae Sakuma is portrayed by Maria Yoshikawa (吉川 まりあ, Yoshikawa Maria).
- Fumihiro Nitta (新田 文博, Nitta Fumihiro): A first-year AGHS student and member of the school's fencing team. After receiving a Zodiarts Switch from Sonoda, Nitta transforms into the Unicorn Zodiarts (ユニコーン・ゾディアーツ, Yunikōn Zodiātsu), gaining the ability to convert his horse face-like mask into the Longsword Monarch (長剣 モナーク, Chōken Monāku) rapier to compliment his fencing skills. He seeks revenge against JK for using him as a human shield against bullies, only to be defeated by Kamen Rider Fourze. Fumihiro Nitta is portrayed by Kiyotaka Uji (宇治 清高, Uji Kiyotaka).
- Teruhiko Satake (佐竹 輝彦, Satake Teruhiko): A first-year AGHS student and the rebellious son of detention teacher Takashi Satake who despite getting good grades, adopts delinquent hobbies and mannerisms due to being unhappy with his life. After receiving a Zodiarts Switch from Sonoda, Teruhiko transforms into the Hound Zodiarts (ハウンド・ゾディアーツ, Haundo Zodiātsu), gaining sharp claws, two wrist blades, a chain, the ability to fire a barrage of needle-like energy bullets, and later a thick hide. He goes on a rampage, or "hunting" as he calls it, with support from Sonoda until he is defeated by Kamen Rider Fourze and Shun in the Powerdizer. Teruhiko Satake is portrayed by Ryūji Satō (佐藤 流司, Satō Ryūji).
- Ritsuko Usaka (鵜坂 律子, Usaka Ritsuko): A third year AGHS student who has been blamed for unexplained events at the school, gave into the persecution, and formed a coven called the Lunar Witches (月世界の魔女, Gessekai no Majo) with other scorned social outcasts. After receiving a Zodiarts Switch from the Scorpion Zodiarts, Usaka uses it to transform into the Altar Zodiarts (アルター・ゾディアーツ, Arutā Zodiātsu), gaining telekinesis via the Aradia Staff (アラディアスタッフ, Aradia Sutaffu) and pyrokinesis. Creating moon pendants for her followers, Usaka channels her powers through them to make it appear as if they are witches until Kengo exposes the deception. In retaliation, Usaka attempts to burn the school down, but Shun destroys her staff before Kamen Rider Fourze defeats her. Following this, Usaka makes minor reappearances throughout the series. Ritsuko Usaka is portrayed by Hikari Kajiwara (梶原 ひかり, Kajiwara Hikari).
- Hiroki Makise (牧瀬 弘樹, Makise Hiroki): The president of the AGHS astronomy club with an obsessive crush on Yuki. Growing jealous of her spending time with Gentaro and the Kamen Rider Club instead of him, Makise receives a Zodiarts Switch and transforms into the stag beetle-like Pyxis Zodiarts (ピクシス・ゾディアーツ, Pikushisu Zodiātsu), gaining dowsing rod-like arm blades that allow him to locate whatever he wishes and redirect oncoming objects at whatever he is pointing at. After losing all infatuation with Yuki, he attempts to seek revenge on all of the girls who rejected him instead, only to be defeated by Kamen Rider Fourze. In the tie-in novel Kamen Rider Fourze: Ama High Grad-Uation, Tsubasa turns Makise back into the Pyxis Zodiarts before making him a component of the Argo Zodiarts. Hiroki Makise is portrayed by Takafumi Shinohara (篠原 孝文, Shinohara Takafumi).
- Soshi Motoyama (元山 惣帥, Motoyama Sōshi): The hyper-critical president of the AGHS art club who desires to create the perfect art piece. After receiving a Zodiarts Switch from Hayami, Motoyama transforms into the Perseus Zodiarts (ペルセウス・ゾディアーツ, Peruseusu Zodiātsu), gaining use of the Oracle Sword (オラクルソード, Orakuru Sōdo) and the Head of Medusa (ヘッドノメドゥーサ, Heddo no Medūsa) on his left hand which grants petrification capabilities initially through touch before evolving into beams. Motoyama uses his powers to attack anyone and anything he believes interferes with his work until Kamen Rider Fourze makes him realize the error of his ways. As Motoyama had unlocked his Resurrection Star, Hayami brainwashes him in an attempt to turn him into a Horoscope, but Fourze defeats Motoyama. Soshi Motoyama is portrayed by Ryutarou Akimoto (秋元 龍太朗, Akimoto Ryūtarō).
- Kimio Nonomura (野々村 公夫, Nonomura Kimio): An AGHS student and Kengo's self-proclaimed academic rival who displays a willingness to attack anyone with better scores and grades than him. After receiving a Zodiarts Switch from Hayami, Nonomura transforms into the Lynx Zodiarts (リンクス・ゾディアーツ, Rinkusu Zodiātsu), gaining increased speed and agility, and a pair of sharp claws. He terrorizes AGHS until he is defeated by Kamen Rider Fourze. Kimio Nonomura is portrayed by Shohei Yamazaki (山崎 将平, Yamazaki Shōhei).
- Jin Nomoto (野本 仁, Nomoto Jin): An intimidating third year AGHS student and the captain of the school's track and field team who refuses to let his team receive outside help. After receiving a Zodiarts Switch from Hayami, Nomoto transforms into the Dragon Zodiarts (ドラゴン・ゾディアーツ, Doragon Zodiātsu), gaining metallic scales capable of withstanding melee attacks and absorbing and redirecting electrical and thermal energy, use of spheres made from his scales, and later the ability to generate fire from his arms. He attacks members of his team for not following his rules and attempts to kill the Kamen Riders after Hayami orders him to until Kamen Rider Fourze defeats Nomoto. Jin Nomoto is portrayed by Ryu Ando (安藤 龍, Andō Ryū).
- Norio Eguchi (江口 規夫, Eguchi Norio): An AGHS student and cosplay otaku who wants to be a hero like Kamen Rider Fourze, but lacks the nerve to do so. Unlike other Zodiarts, after receiving a Zodiarts Switch from Hayami, Eguchi develops a split personality embodying his negative traits that manifests as the Cygnus Zodiarts (キグナス・ゾディアーツ, Kigunasu Zodiātsu), who refers to himself simply as "Cygnus" and possesses sharp claws, the ability to fire shurikens made from his feathers, and a ballet-inspired, kick-based fighting style. Cygnus attempts to replace Fourze as a hero and displace Eguchi, who possesses no memory of being Cygnus, until Kamen Rider Meteor destroys the Zodiarts. Norio Eguchi is portrayed by Shugo Nagashima (永嶋 柊吾, Nagashima Shūgo) while the Cygnus Zodiarts is voiced by Taiki Matsuno (松野 太紀, Matsuno Taiki).
- Yayoi Tokuda (徳田 弥生, Tokuda Yayoi): A third year AGHS student and president of the school's newspaper with an intense desire to find the truth. After receiving a Zodiarts Switch from Kijima, Tokuda transforms into the Coma Zodiarts (コーマ・ゾディアーツ, Kōma Zodiātsu), gaining the use of tendril-like hair that can split off and form clones of past Zodiarts with their original powers. After discovering the identities of three previous Switchers, Tokuda uses her powers to recreate their Zodiarts forms and increase the newspaper's popularity out of a desire to delay her graduation from AGHS. She later receives help from Kijima in attacking the prom, only to be defeated by Kamen Rider Fourze and Shun in the Powerdizer. Yayoi Tokuda is portrayed by Kasumi Suzuki (鈴木 かすみ, Suzuki Kasumi).
- Tatsumori Yamada (山田 竜守, Yamada Tatsumori): A quiet AGHS drama club member, Subaruboshi High transfer student, and the Aries Zodiarts (アリエス・ゾディアーツ, Ariesu Zodiātsu). While transformed, he wields the Coppelius (コッペリウス, Kopperiusu) scepter and possesses an aura that can manipulate a person's bodily functions. His Supernova ability allows him to transform into Aries Nova (アリエス・ノヴァ, Ariesu Nova), which grants a sleeker body and the ability to fire energy spheres. Having developed a god complex, Yamada quickly came to disregard Mitsuaki Gamou's goals and stopped attending meetings with his fellow Horoscopes. To escape his scrutiny, Yamada transferred to Subaruboshi High, took on the title of "The Apostle of Sleep (眠りの使徒, Nemuri no Shito), and abused his abilities by forcing his new classmates to act out roles he assigns them. When Kamen Rider Meteor comes to him for help in reviving Jiro Iseki, Yamada obliges in exchange for Meteor killing Fourze and the Kamen Rider Club. Ultimately however, Meteor chooses to join Fourze in fighting Yamada, who ends up in a coma following his defeat while his Horoscope Switch falls into Gamou's possession. Tatsumori Yamada (Note: The kanji that make up his given name Tatsumori (竜守) translates into "dragon guard", referencing the dragon in the legend of Aries' Golden Fleece.) is portrayed by Kazuma Kawahara (川原 一馬, Kawahara Kazuma).
- Tojiro Goto (五藤 東次郎, Gotō Tōjirō): A recent transfer student at AGHS, friend of JK's from junior high school, and an aspiring rock star with terrible guitar playing skills under the stage name "God". After being found by Hayami, Goto quickly becomes the Capricorn Zodiarts (カプリコーン・ゾディアーツ, Kapurikōn Zodiātsu). While transformed, he wields the Uruk (ウルク, Uruku) electric guitar, which can manipulate sound, generate devastating sonic waves, and entrance and trap people within a Cosmic Energy manifestation of the musical staff, with the entranced people going on a "high" for a period of time before suffering an adrenaline crash that can last for days. Upon learning of the youth's ability to resonate with certain Switches, Kou Tatsugami hypothesizes Goto can locate the Core Switch for Gamou, who bestows Goto his Supernova powers to increase the Horoscopes' chances of success. Wishing to fulfill his dream of becoming a rock star, Goto reunites with JK in the hopes of reworking their old band into Gene God Dark Night Carnival, using his powers to improve their musical skills while secretly brainwashing listeners into crazed fans. However, Fourze gets through to JK via one of the latter's father's songs and breaks Goto's spell with his own terrible guitar playing skills. Fourze subsequently defeats Goto before the latter can use his Supernova ability, but Gamou has Goto spirited away to confiscate his Horoscope Switch before erasing his memory since the youth had confirmed the Core Switch is still active. Tojiro Goto (Note: His surname is pronounced similarly to the English word "goat" (ゴート, gōto). Additionally, his rock star name "God" is a reference to Kamen Rider X's main antagonists, the Government of Darkness (G.O.D.)) is portrayed by Ryousuke Kawamura (川村 亮介, Kawamura Ryōsuke).
- Erin Suda (エリーヌ須田, Erīnu Suda): An elitist American transfer student who came to AGHS to pursue her dream of becoming an astronaut like her father prior to his retirement. While participating in AGHS' annual Astronaut Selection Exam (宇宙飛行士選抜試験, Uchūhikōshi Senbatsu Shiken), she quickly befriends Gentaro, develops a disliking towards Yuki after seeing someone who robbed her father of his last chance to go into space from him in her, and receives the means to transform into the Aquarius Zodiarts (アクエリアス・ゾディアーツ, Akueriasu Zodiātsu). While transformed, she wields the Nectar (ネクタル, Nekutaru) whip and vase-like pauldrons that can be used to heal herself and others unless they are shattered simultaneously. Despite befriending Yuki and becoming distressed by the fact that Gentaro is Kamen Rider Fourze, whom she is tasked with eliminating, Suda's respect for and dedication towards Gamou leads to her facing Fourze in a duel under the belief that one of them must fall. Suda is defeated, but Gamou has her spirited away in order to erase her memory of being a Horoscope and claim her Horoscope Switch. Following this, Suda effectively befriends Gentaro and Yuki anew. Erin Suda (Note: An anagram of her full name is "Eridanus", a river in Greek mythology that is sometimes associated with the myth of Aquarius.) is portrayed by Karen Takizawa (滝沢 カレン, Takizawa Karen).
- Yuta Sugiura (杉浦 雄太, Sugiura Yūta): A third year AGHS student and interim student body president. He initially held steadfastly onto the school's policies towards student individuality and bickered with his predecessor, Sayaka Mibu, over idealistic differences. Following her being hospitalized and him gaining the means to transform into the Taurus Zodiarts (タウラス・ゾディアーツ, Taurasu Zodiātsu) however, a panicked Sugiura uses his newly acquired position and Gu-anna (グアンナ, Guanna) scepter, which allows him to force people into keeping a contracted promise and turn people into loyal drones by removing their souls, to create and enforce the Amanogawa Campus Bylaws to drastically limit his classmates' individuality and effectively bring AGHS under his control, using his feelings for Mibu to justify his actions. However, Fourze brings Mibu to see what Sugiura has done and convince him to stop by breaking his rules. Unable to bring himself to punish her, Sugiura breaks down and fights Kuniteru Emoto when he arrives to remind him of his place with the Horoscopes, only to be seemingly sent to the Dark Nebula and secretly placed in suspended animation within the M-BUS while his Horoscope Switch comes into Gamou's possession. As of the tie-in novel Kamen Rider Fourze: Ama High Grad-Uation, Sugiura is safely returned to Earth. Yuta Sugiura (Note: The kana that make up his full name, すぎうらゆうた, can be rearranged to form たうらすぎゆう, or Taurusu Gyū (タウラス 牛, Taurus Bull).) is portrayed by Kenta Itogi (絲木 建太, Itogi Kenta).
- "Dark Yuki" (闇ユウキ, Yami Yūki): A doppelgänger of Yuki who was created when Kouhei Hayami and Kou Tatsugami forced her to activate a Zodiarts Switch. Unlike other Zodiarts, the negative aspects of Yuki's personality split off into a separate physical form completely identical to hers, save for a mask with a blank expression where her face would be. As a result, she utilizes her ability to transform into the Gemini Zodiarts (ジェミニ・ゾディアーツ, Jemini Zodiātsu) to act on her template's darkest desires in an attempt to usurp her as the dominant version. While transformed, Dark Yuki possesses an unorthodox fighting style and wields red Lynceus (リュンケウス, Ryunkeus) cards that explode on contact and blue Idas (イーダス, Īdasu) cards that explode on her command. Her Supernova ability allows her to produce a clone of herself that doubles as a living explosive. Dark Yuki nearly succeeds until Gentaro reminds Yuki of a strong memory from their childhood to reverse the process, destroying Dark Yuki while Tatsugami retrieves the Gemini Switch for Gamou. Dark Yuki (Note: An alternate Romanization of Yuki Jojima's name is "Yuuki Jousima", which is an anagram of "I am Soujikyuu", with Sōjikyū (双児宮, Gemini) as an alternative spelling.) is portrayed by Fumika Shimizu, who also portrays Yuki Jojima, and voiced by Hiromi Konno (今野 宏美, Konno Hiromi).

==== Other Zodiarts ====
- Argo Zodiarts (アルゴ・ゾディアーツ, Arugo Zodiātsu): A giant, non-humanoid Zodiarts that Tsubasa created from the Pyxis, Carina, Puppis, and Vela Zodiarts capable of summoning pirate-themed Dustards. The Argo Zodiarts appears exclusively in the tie-in novel Kamen Rider Fourze: Ama High Grad-Uation.
  - Ryoko Sakamoto (坂本 遼子, Sakamoto Ryōko), Sumie Taira (平良 すみえ, Taira Sumie), and Seiru Hozumi (穂積 聖瑠, Hozumi Seiru): Problem AGHS students who experienced stress over the upcoming prom that Tsubasa turned into the Carina Zodiarts (カリーナ・ゾディアーツ, Karīna Zodiātsu), Puppis Zodiarts (プッピス・ゾディアーツ, Puppisu Zodiātsu), and Vela Zodiarts (ヴェラ・ゾディアーツ, Vera Zodiātsu) respectively. Ryoko Sakamoto, Sumie Taira, and Seiru Hozumi all appear exclusively in the tie-in novel Kamen Rider Fourze: Ama High Grad-Uation.

=== Toshiya Miura ===
Toshiya Miura (三浦 俊也, Miura Toshiya) is a second-year AGHS student and a member of the American football team. Due to Shun's father making unpopular decisions for the team and ruining his chances at playing football, Miura acquires a Zodiarts Switch and transforms into the Orion Zodiarts (オリオン・ゾディアーツ, Orion Zodiātsu) to seek revenge, only to be defeated by Kamen Rider Fourze. Despite this, Miura became addicted to the power of Zodiarts Switches and became a shut-in. Months later, Fourze, the Kamen Rider Club, and Miura's girlfriend Mari Yamamoto of the AGHS photography club investigate and learn of what happened to him and attempt to bring him back to school. When the Scorpion Zodiarts offers to turn him back into the Orion Zodiarts, Miura recalls his old self and resists the temptation before befriending Fourze and returning to AGHS as a member of the photography club to be with Yamamoto.

As the Orion Zodiarts, Miura possesses superhuman strength and endurance and wields the Lemnos (リムノス, Rimunosu) club and Chios (キオス, Kiosu) shield.

Toshiya Miura is portrayed by Masanori Mizuno (水野 真典, Mizuno Masanori).

=== Takashi Satake ===
Takashi Satake (佐竹 剛, Satake Takashi) is the cruel and unforgiving AGHS teacher in charge of the Sunday remedial class/detention session, which the students refer to as "Study Hell" (地獄補習, Jigoku Hoshū), believing it is where only the most troublesome students get sent to. Additionally, Takashi displays an extreme intolerance for delinquents, likening to them to dirt spots on a clean surface. After Fourze rescues his son Teruhiko however, Takashi has a change of heart and eventually goes on to become the new principal following Kouhei Hayami's death.

Takashi Satake is portrayed by Satoshi Jinbo (神保 悟志, Jinbo Satoshi).

=== Jiro Iseki ===
Jiro Iseki (井石 二郎, Iseki Jirō) is one of Ryusei's friends from Subaruboshi High School who acquired a malfunctioning Zodiarts Switch through unknown means in an attempt to become stronger than Ryusei, only for the Switch to put him into a coma. Due to the Switch remaining on and Jiro being the only one capable of turning it off, he is unable to be treated by conventional medicine. As a result, Ryusei became Kamen Rider Meteor and attempts to locate the Aries Zodiarts to save him. While Ryusei eventually succeeds in reviving Jiro, who deactivates his Switch, the latter is horrified to learn what the former did to save him, loses his will to live, and relapses. After helping Fourze defeat Aries, Ryusei makes amends with Jiro and helps him recover.

Jiro Iseki is portrayed by Ryusei Yokohama (横浜 流星, Yokohama Ryūsei).

=== Haru Kusao ===
Haru Kusao (草尾 ハル, Kusao Haru) is a meek first year AGHS student who receives a Zodiarts Switch from Kouhei Hayami and becomes the Musca Zodiarts (ムスカ・ゾディアーツ, Musuka Zodiātsu) to protect his overprotective friend Ran Kuroki, who had sworn to protect him at their previous school. As his Zodiarts form evolves, however, Haru becomes addicted to the Switch's power and his mental state grows increasingly unstable until Fourze restrains him long enough for Ran to apologize for being overprotective of him. After Haru asks Fourze to defeat him, he is temporarily hospitalized and given provisional, later full, membership with the Kamen Rider Club alongside Ran.

As the Musca Zodiarts, Haru initially has the ability to emit slime from his mouth and possesses superhuman jumping. As he evolves, he gains armor, increased strength, the ability to separate into a swarm of flies, wings, and the ability to emit explosive slime balls.

Haru Kusao is portrayed by Jigen Araki (荒木 次元, Araki Jigen).

== Guest characters ==
- Jun Shigeno (繁野 ジュン, Shigeno Jun): A second-year AGHS student and member of the cheerleading squad who comes off as an airhead with a hearty appetite. After Miu leaves the cheerleading squad to join the Kamen Rider Club, she leaves Shigeno in charge. Over the course of the series, Shigeno slowly improves the squad, to Miu's delight. Jun Shigeno is portrayed by Arisa Fujisaki (藤嵜 亜莉沙, Fujisaki Arisa).
- Chosuke Ban (番 長介, Ban Chōsuke): A third-year AGHS student and the leader of a group of delinquents who hang out behind the school. Chosuke Ban is portrayed by Takahiro Kuroishi (黒石 高大, Kuroishi Takahiro).
- Reiko Hirota (広田 玲子, Hirota Reiko): A first-year student that Gentaro tries to convince to enter the Queen Festival to unseat Miu from her yearly winning streak, only for an attack by the Chameleon Zodiarts to scare Hirota into backing out. Hirota later becomes Shun's girlfriend after Miu dumps him, only to dump him in turn after seeing him in detention. Months later, Hirota is among the girls that Hiroki Makise kidnaps before Shun rescues them. Reiko Hirota is portrayed by Yurika Tachibana (橘 ゆりか, Tachibana Yurika).
- Takato Daimonji (大文字 高人, Daimonji Takato): Shun's father who planned out his son's life for him. Takato Daimonji is portrayed by Ryo Kamon (加門 良, Kamon Ryō).
- Megumi Aizaki (相崎 めぐみ, Aizaki Megumi): An AGHS student and associate of JK's. Megumi Aizaki is portrayed by Aya Itakura (板倉 亜弥, Itakura Aya).
- Takahiro Tanaka (田中 高広, Tanaka Takahiro): An AGHS student, pickpocket, and associate of JK's. Takahiro Tanaka is portrayed by Nachi Okawa (央川 奈知, Ōkawa Nachi).
- Yuri Kuramochi (倉持 ゆり, Kuramochi Yuri) and : An AGHS student, goth, former member of the AGHS swim team, and minor member of the Lunar Witches. Yuri Kuramochi is portrayed by Miho Imamura (今村 美歩, Imamura Miho).
- Masami Okamura (岡村 雅美, Okamura Masami): An AGHS student, goth, former cheerleader, and minor member of the Lunar Witches. Masami Okamura is portrayed by Maika Suzuki (鈴木 米香, Suzuki Maika).
- Mari Yamamoto (山本 麻里, Yamamoto Mari): An AGHS student, member of the school's photography club, and Toshiya Miura's girlfriend. Mari Yamamoto is portrayed by Natsumi Ishibashi (石橋 菜津美, Ishibashi Natsumi).
- Junta Abe (阿部 純太, Abe Junta): A second-year AGHS student, president of the school's glee club, and friend of Soshi Motoyama. Junta Abe is portrayed by Tokimasa Tanabe (田辺 季正, Tanabe Tokimasa).
- Taira Katagiri (片桐 平, Katagiri Taira): An overweight first-year AGHS student and a member of the school's glee club. Taira Katagiri is portrayed by Yosuke Nishi (西 洋亮, Nishi Yōsuke).
- Ibuki Watanabe (渡辺 伊吹, Watanabe Ibuki): A student in Gentaro, Yuki]], and Kengo's homeroom class and a member of the school's glee club. Ibuki Watanabe is portrayed by Ibuki Yoshida (吉田 伊吹, Yoshida Ibuki).
- Rumi Egawa (江川 留美, Egawa Rumi): A second-year AGHS student and a member of the school's track and field club with an inferiority complex regarding her above average height and size for girls. Rumi Egawa is portrayed by Youki Kato (加藤 侑紀, Katō Yūki).
- Haruka Utsugi (宇津木 遥, Utsugi Haruka): A skilled kickboxer and Sarina Sonoda's replacement as AGHS' class 2-B's homeroom teacher who took up teaching out of fear of being unable to making a living out of kickboxing, though she openly desires to quit her current job. After taking Natsuji Kijima's rakugo fan, he seeks revenge by turning into a Zodiarts, attacking martial artists, and framing Utsugi. However, Gentaro and the Kamen Rider Club discover the truth and inspire Utsugi to stay true to her life path and suggest she balance everything out instead. After helping Gentaro defeat Kijima, Utsugi chooses to stay on at AGHS and form a kickboxing club. As of the crossover film Kamen Rider × Kamen Rider Wizard & Fourze: Movie War Ultimatum, Utsugi has led the AGHS kickboxing club to a high school national tournament. Haruka Utsugi is portrayed by Nao Nagasawa (長澤 奈央, Nagasawa Nao).
- Misa Toriizaki (鳥居崎 ミサ, Toriizaki Misa): A member of AGHS' ballet club and leader of the Ugly Duckling Society (醜いアヒルの子の会, Minikui Ahiru-no-ko no Kai), a club composed of people that the Cygnus Zodiarts saved and follow him religiously. As the head of the Society, she grades people in a way similar to how Cygnus believes people are worthy of his presence. Being faithful to the Zodiarts, Toriizaki attempts to force Norio Eguchi to transform into Cygnus, only to learn the Zodiarts' true colors and disband the Ugly Duckling Society. Misa Toriizaki is portrayed by Kaya Asano (浅野 かや, Asano Kaya).
- Goro Kisaragi (如月 吾郎, Kisaragi Gorō): Gentaro's grandfather who looked after him since his parents died in an accident and owns a local motorcycle shop called Kisaragi Motorcycle Engineering (如月モータース, Kisaragi Mōtāsu). Goro Kisaragi is portrayed by Nobuo Yana (八名 信夫, Yana Nobuo).
- Yukina Takamura (高村 優希奈, Takamura Yukina): A third-year AGHS student in Gentaro, Yuki, Kengo, and Ryusei's homeroom class. Upon discovering Gentaro is Kamen Rider Fourze, Takamura takes pity on him, believing his heroic life is taking away from his regular life and goes to extreme lengths to make him quit. Eventually, Gentaro and Yuki convince Takamura to give up her quest and help her understand why he helps people. Yukina Takamura is portrayed by Mika Akizuki (秋月 三佳, Akizuki Mika).
- Sayaka Mibu (壬生 彩加, Mibu Sayaka): A third-year AGHS student and the school's student council president who clashes with Yuta Sugiura over a variety of matters concerning the student body, such as students abusing the school's policies regarding individuality and freedom, with her wanting to keep them in check. After being hospitalized by a group of delinquents, Sugiura takes her place and takes drastic measures to implement Mibu's wishes. Upon learning what he did, Mibu returns to school and convinces him to stop. Sayaka Mibu is portrayed by Yuka Eda (江田 結香, Eda Yuka).
- Shoko Oki (沖 荘子, Oki Shōko): The head of the student council's decency committee who has feelings for Sugiura despite knowing he has feelings for Mibu. When Sugiura takes Mibu's place and establishes the Amanogawa Campus Bylaws, Oki faithfully follows his lead in the hopes he will notice her. However, he attempts to punish her after she fails to capture Tomoko, leading to Oki telling Gentaro to tell Mibu of what Sugiura has done. Shoko Oki is portrayed by Seira Maeda (前田 聖来, Maeda Seira).
- Keizo Jingu (神宮 敬蔵, Jingū Keizō): JK's father and a former rock star turned fisherman. Keizo Jingu is portrayed by Seigi Shimizu (志水 正義, Shimizu Seigi) and Ryo of defspiral as a youth.
- Yuki's parents: Yuki's eccentric mother and father who are in love with different cultures and like to dress up in a style that matches the meals they make. Yuki's mother and father are portrayed by Mari Takahashi (高橋 麻理, Takahashi Mari) and Yuu Kamio (神尾 佑, Kamio Yū) respectively.
- Mr. Morota (諸田先生, Morota-sensei): An effeminate math teacher at AGHS who displays romantic feelings for Kouhei Hayami. Mr. Morota is portrayed by Satoshi Morota (諸田 敏, Morota Satoshi), the series' director.
- Haruto Soma (操真 晴人, Sōma Haruto): A former soccer player turned magician who can transform into Kamen Rider Wizard (仮面ライダーウィザード, Kamen Raidā Wizādo). Following a cameo appearance in the series finale, he joins forces with Gentaro, Ryusei, and Nadeshiko to defeat the Akumaizer in the crossover film Kamen Rider × Kamen Rider Wizard & Fourze: Movie War Ultimatum. Haruto Soma is portrayed by Shunya Shiraishi (白石 隼也, Shiraishi Shun'ya), ahead of his appearance in Kamen Rider Wizard.

== Spin-off characters ==
=== Nadeshiko Misaki ===
Nadeshiko Misaki (美咲 撫子, Misaki Nadeshiko) (Note: Misaki was originally going to be named after Kamen Rider Stronger character Yuriko Misaki / Electro-Wave Human Tackle.) is an alien lifeform called SOLU ("Seeds Of Life from the Universe") who mimicked her namesake's appearance, becomes an AGHS student, and makes her first appearance in the crossover film Kamen Rider × Kamen Rider Fourze & OOO: Movie War Mega Max. After seeing Gentaro transform into Kamen Rider Fourze, Misaki uses her alien powers to create her own Rider powers and transform into Kamen Rider Nadeshiko (仮面ライダーなでしこ, Kamen Raidā Nadeshiko). However, she is kidnapped by Suddendath of Foundation X, who turns her into the SOLU Switch for Lem Kannagi. After Fourze joins forces with Kamen Rider OOO to defeat Kannagi, Misaki becomes a being of pure energy and leaves Earth.

During the events of the crossover film Kamen Rider × Kamen Rider Wizard & Fourze: Movie War Ultimatum, XVII brings Misaki back to Earth to help Kamen Riders Fourze and Wizard defeat the Akumaizer.

Utilizing the Nadeshiko Driver (なでしこドライバー, Nadeshiko Doraibā) belt and two copies of Fourze's Astroswitches, Misaki can transform into Kamen Rider Nadeshiko. While transformed, she can use her alien powers to create copies and/or stronger versions of Fourze's equipment. Her Limit Breaks are the Nadeshiko Rocket Kick (なでしこロケットキック, Nadeshiko Roketto Kikku) on her own and the Double Rider Rocket Punch (ダブルライダーロケットパンチ, Daburu Raidā Roketto Panchi) with Fourze.

Nadeshiko Misaki is portrayed by Erina Mano (真野 恵里菜, Mano Erina), who also portrays the girl whose appearance Misaki mimicked.

=== Foundation X ===
Foundation X (財団X, Zaidan Ekkusu) is a mysterious research foundation that originally funded and researched the Museum's Gaia Memories before shifting their attention to other projects, such as funding Mitsuaki Gamou's work with Cosmic Energy and Zodiarts Switches.

==== Lem Kannagi ====
Lem Kannagi (レム・カンナギ, Remu Kannagi) is a mysterious Foundation X agent who appears exclusively in the crossover film Kamen Rider × Kamen Rider Fourze & OOO: Movie War Mega Max. While searching for a mysterious substance called SOLU, which is only found in two meteorites that collided with Earth, he mutated human test subjects into the Super Evolved Lifeform Mutamits (超進化生命ミュータミット, Chō Shinka Seimei Myūtamitto) and created the Dummy Inhumanoids (ダミー怪人, Damī Kaijin), which are capable of assuming varying monstrous forms, from his mobile spaceship lab, Exodus (エクソダス, Ekusodasu). Upon gathering the necessary materials, he goes rogue, transforms into the monstrous Super Gingaoh (超銀河王, Chō Ginga Ō), and attempts to take over the world. However, he is defeated by Kamen Riders Fourze and OOO, who destroy him along with the Exodus.

On his own, Kannagi can utilize his breath as a repelling or attracting force and dissolve unprotected humans. With the Gingaoh Driver (ギンガオードライバー, Gingaō Doraibā) belt, the SOLU Switch (SOLU スイッチ, Soru Suitchi), and Kamen Rider Poseidon's future Core Medals, Kannagi can transform into Super Gingaoh. While transformed, he possesses chronokinesis, a hover pack, and the ability to convert his cape into a boomerang-shaped sword. (Note: Super Gingaoh is based on Gingaoh (銀河王, Ginga Ō) from the Skyrider film Eight Riders vs. Gingaoh.)

Lem Kannagi is portrayed by Toru Masuoka (益岡 徹, Masuoka Tōru).

==== Katal ====
Katal (カタル, Kataru) is one of Lem Kannagi's subordinates who can transform into a draconic Mutamit called Suddendath (サドンダス, Sadondasu) (Note: Suddendath is based on Suddendass of the Skyrider film Eight Riders vs. Gingaoh.) and appears exclusively in the crossover film Kamen Rider × Kamen Rider Fourze & OOO: Movie War Mega Max. While helping Kannagi achieve his goals, Katal fights Kamen Rider Fourze and the Kamen Rider Club before the former kills him.

Katal is portrayed by Dante Carver (ダンテ・カーヴァー, Dante Kāvā).

==== Solaris ====
Solaris (ソラリス, Sorarisu) is one of Lem Kannagi's subordinates who was transformed into a Mutamit, possesses a Zodiarts Switch that allows her to transform into a copy of the Unicorn Zodiarts, and appears exclusively in the crossover film Kamen Rider × Kamen Rider Fourze & OOO: Movie War Mega Max. While helping Kannagi achieve his goals, she is defeated by Kamen Rider W.

Solaris is portrayed by Sanae Hitomi (人見 早苗, Hitomi Sanae).

==== Kiima ====
Chancellor Kiima (キイマ総統官, Kiima-sōtōkan) is the superior of Lem Kannagi, who kills her after his plan to take over the world is exposed and he goes rogue.

Chancellor Kiima is portrayed by Azusa Watanabe (渡辺 梓, Watanabe Azusa).

=== Kyodain ===
The Space Ironmen Kyodain (宇宙鉄人キョーダイン, Uchū Tetsujin Kyōdain) (Note: The Kyodain are an homage to the protagonists from the television series Space Ironman Kyodain, which was also created by Shotaro Ishinomori.) are two of the three Machine Organisms (機械生命体, Kikai Seimeitai) that Professor Blink created and infused with Cosmic Energy who first appear in the film Kamen Rider Fourze the Movie: Space, Here We Come! After attaining sentience and developing elitist personalities, they killed Blink and attempted to attack humanity, only for Blink and XVII to lock them in human forms and trap them on Earth. Despite this, the Kyodain utilize their human forms to create the front organization OSTO Legacy (オスト・レガシー, Osuto Regashī) and manipulate the Kamen Rider Club into helping them regain their full capabilities, only to be destroyed by Kamen Rider Fourze.

In the crossover film Kamen Rider × Super Sentai × Space Sheriff: Super Hero Taisen Z, new versions of the Kyodain join Space Shocker. However, their sense of honor and desire to fight Gavan lead to the pair being destroyed by Space Ikadevil for acting against Space Shocker's cause.

==== Groundain ====
Groundain (グランダイン, Gurandain) (Note: Groundain is an homage to Grounzel from Space Ironman Kyodain.) is the blue-colored older brother figure who takes on the identity of Harumi Saeba (冴葉 晴海, Saeba Harumi), the general manager of OSTO Legacy.

In battle, Groundain is equipped with the chest-mounted Grounblaster X (グランブラスターX, Guranburasutā Ekkusu) cannon and possesses the ability to summon Dustards using his Cosmic Energy like the Horoscopes. He can also transform into the car-themed Grouncar (グランカー, Gurankā).

Groundain is voiced by Kohki Okada (岡田 浩暉, Okada Kōki), who also portrays Harumi Saeba.

==== Skydain ====
Skydain (スカイダイン, Sukaidain) (Note: Skydain is an homage to Skyzel from Space Ironman Kyodain.) is the red-colored younger sister figure who takes on the identity of Shizuka Shirayama (白山 静, Shirayama Shizuka), Saeba's personal secretary.

In battle, Skydain is equipped with the twin forearm-mounted Skycutter (スカイカッター, Sukaikattā) blades. She can also transform into the jet-themed Skyjet (スカイジェット, Sukaijetto), which allows her to fire Skymissiles (スカイミサイル, Sukaimisairu).

Skydain is voiced by Ayumi Kinoshita (木下 あゆ美, Kinoshita Ayumi), who also portrays Shizuka Shirayama.

=== XVII ===
Satellite Weapon XVII (衛星兵器XVII（エックスブイツー）, Eisei Heiki Ekkusu Bui Tsū) (Note: XVII is an homage to Daitetsujin 17, which was also created by Shotaro Ishinomori, while the Gunbase are an homage to the support robot character Gonbesu from Space Ironman Kyodain.) is a large satellite with the personality of Professor Blink capable of communicating with humans via the Brain (ブレイン, Burein) global computer terminal who first appears in the film Kamen Rider Fourze the Movie: Space, Here We Come!. After the Kyodain fatally injured Blink, XVII trapped the androids in human forms and sent them to Earth years prior. With help from Kamen Rider Fourze and the Kamen Rider Club, XVII combats the Kyodain when they resurface in the present before befriending Fourze and leaving to journey through space. In the crossover film, Kamen Rider × Kamen Rider Wizard & Fourze: Movie War Ultimatum, XVII brings Nadeshiko Misaki back to Earth so she can aid Fourze and Kamen Rider Wizard in their fight against the Akumaizer.

XVII can transform from its satellite mode into a large humanoid robot mode called the One Seven Formation (ワンセブンフォーメーション, Wan Sebun Fōmēshon) and possesses Gunbase (ガンベース, Ganbēsu) drones, which serve as a defense mechanism.

XVII is voiced by Tsutomu Isobe (磯部 勉, Isobe Tsutomu).

=== Alicia Federation ===
The Alicia Federation (アリシア連邦, Arishia Renpō) is a mysterious organization that appear exclusively in the film Kamen Rider Fourze the Movie: Space, Here We Come!.

==== Professor Blink ====
Professor Blink (ブリンク博士, Burinku-hakase) is an Alicia Federation scientist who created the Kyodain, who killed him after attaining sentience.

Professor Blink is portrayed by Ken Nishida (西田 健, Nishida Ken).

==== Inga Blink ====
Inga Blink (インガ・ブリンク, Inga Burinku) (Note: Inga's name is an anagram of Gaburin Kwīn (ガブリンクィーン, "Gaburin Queen"), a member of Planet Dada's Earth Invading Robot Army from Space Ironman Kyodain.) is an Alicia Federation agent, a practitioner of the Seishin Dairin Fist, and daughter of Professor Blink partnered with Black Knight. In the film Kamen Rider Fourze the Movie: Space, Here We Come!, she attempts to stop the Kamen Rider Club upon discovering they are unknowingly aiding the Kyodain before joining forces with the club to defeat the androids. Five years later, as of the events of the film Kamen Rider × Kamen Rider Wizard & Fourze: Movie War Ultimatum, Inga has joined Interpol and became Ryusei's partner.

Inga Blink is portrayed by Mikie Hara (原 幹恵, Hara Mikie).

==== Black Knight ====
Black Knight (ブラックナイト, Burakku Naito) (Note: Black Knight is an homage to Black Knight of the Robot Army Corps, the main antagonists of Space Ironman Kyodain.) is the third Machine Organism that Professor Blink created whose mental capacity, unlike the Kyodain, developed more slowly. As a result, Black Knight became a loyal member of the Alicia Federation partnered with Inga Blink. While helping her and the Kamen Rider Club stop the Kyodain in the present, Black Knight sacrifices itself to protect them.

In battle, Black Knight possesses armor that increases its defensive capabilities, and wields the Blackest Reaper (ブラッケスト・リーパー, Burakkesuto Rīpā) rapier and a machine gun built into his chest.

=== Miyoko Ohki ===
Miyoko Ohki (大木 美代子, Ōki Miyoko), (Note: Miyoko is an homage to Satoko Ohki (大木 サトコ, Ōki Satoko), the heroine of the Inazuman manga.) nicknamed "Miyoppe" (ミヨッペ), is a student at AGHS and the only member of the Space Kamen Rider Club who appears exclusively in the film Kamen Rider × Kamen Rider Wizard & Fourze: Movie War Ultimatum.

Miyoko Ohki is portrayed by Rika Adachi (足立 梨花, Adachi Rika).

=== Monster League ===
The Monster League (怪人同盟, Kaijin Dōmei) (Note: The Monster/Youth League is an homage to the Youth League from Inazuman, which was also created by Shotaro Ishinomori.) is a club composed of psychic youths who the Akumaizer and Kageto Banba used in their respective plots in 2012 and 2017 before the youths are rescued by Kamen Riders Wizard and Fourze, become the Youth League (少年同盟, Shōnen Dōmei) in 2017, and appear exclusively in the crossover film Kamen Rider × Kamen Rider Wizard & Fourze: Movie War Ultimatum.

==== Saburo Kazeta ====
Saburo Kazeta (風田 三郎, Kazeta Saburō) (Note: Saburo Kazeta is an homage to the manga version of Inazuman while the Zeber is an homage to a device used by the TV version in the sequel series Inazuman Flash.) is the leader of the Monster League whose psychic powers initially allow him to transform into a pupa-like mutant called Sanagiman (サナギマン) and makes his first appearance in the film Kamen Rider × Kamen Rider Wizard & Fourze: Movie War Ultimatum. While attending AGHS in 2017, he allows Kageto Banba to assist him and the Monster League until Kazeta learns Banba is using a device called the Zeber (ゼーバー, Zēbā) to steal his psychic energy. Upon learning his mistake and receiving help from his teacher Gentaro, Kazeta finds the will to fight for justice and transforms into a blue moth-like mutant called Inazuman (イナズマン) to defeat Banba. Vowing to protect his fellow AGHS students, Kazeta reworks the Monster League into the Youth League. During the events of the film Kamen Rider × Super Sentai × Space Sheriff: Super Hero Taisen Z, a time distortion temporarily brings Kazeta to 2013, allowing him to join a past version of Gentaro in fighting Space Shocker.

As Sanagiman, Kazeta possesses durable armor-like skin and superhuman strength. As the "Warrior of Freedom" (自由の戦士、, Jiyū no Senshi) Inazuman, Kazeta possesses the ability to fly and perform the Psychokinesis Chop (念力チョップ, Nenriki Choppu) and Lightning Typhoon (稲妻タイフーン, Inazuma Taifūn) attacks and the Super-Powered Inazuma Drop (超力イナズマ落とし, Chōriki Inazuma Otoshi) finisher.

Saburo Kazeta is portrayed by Kenta Suga (須賀 健太, Suga Kenta). As a child, Saburo is portrayed by Itsuki Shibuya (渋谷 樹生, Shibuya Itsuki).

==== Rumi Komaki ====
Rumi Komaki (小牧 瑠美, Komaki Rumi), nicknamed "Ruby" (ルビー, Rubī), is a member of the Monster League.

Rumi Komaki is portrayed by Kasumi Yamaya (山谷 花純, Yamaya Kasumi). As a child, Rumi is portrayed by Shiori Haga (芳賀 栞, Haga Shiori).

==== Daita Kondo ====
Daita Kondo (近藤 大太, Kondō Daita), nicknamed "Kong" (コング, Kongu), is a member of the Monster League.

Daita Kondo is portrayed by Kazuyoshi Nakazawa (中澤 兼利, Nakazawa Kazuyoshi). As a child, Daita is portrayed by Taiga Sakamoto (坂本 大河, Sakamoto Taiga).

==== Chikao Nezu ====
Chikao Nezu (根津 誓夫, Nezu Chikao), nicknamed "Nezumi" (ネズミ), is a member of the Monster League.

Chikao Nezu is portrayed by Yuya Hara (原 勇弥, Hara Yūya). As a child, Chikao is portrayed by Hidetoshi Akutsu (阿久津 秀寿, Akutsu Hidetoshi).

=== Kageto Banba ===
Kageto Banba (番場 影人, Banba Kageto) (Note: Banba is an homage to Emperor Banba, the main antagonist of Inazuman.) is a man with psychic powers who created the Zeber device to store psychic energy, possesses a Zodiarts Switch that allows him to transform into the Hercules Zodiarts (ヘラクレス・ゾディアーツ, Herakuresu Zodiatsu), and appears exclusively in the film Kamen Rider × Kamen Rider Wizard & Fourze: Movie War Ultimatum. He was previously involved in Mitsuaki Gamou's studies into Cosmic Energy before leaving in order to devote himself to the study of his psychic powers instead. Banba intends to use the Monster League in pursuit of his goals, but is defeated by Saburo Kazeta and arrested by Ryusei, who destroys his Zodiarts Switch. Despite this, Banba is able to energize the Zeber and hand it off to the Akumaizer for their plans.

As the Hercules Zodiarts, Banba can conjure Dustards, possesses superhuman strength, and wields the Tyrant (タイラント, Tairanto) club.

Kageto Banba is portrayed by Toshiya Toyama (遠山 俊也, Toyama Toshiya).

=== Tsubasa ===
Tsubasa (ツバサ) is a SOLU organism that split off from Nadeshiko Misaki and appears exclusively in the tie-in novel Kamen Rider Fourze: Ama High Grad-Uation. During Kamen Riders Fourze and Nadeshiko's fight with Kuniteru Emoto as the Virgo Zodiarts during the events of the film Kamen Rider × Kamen Rider Fourze & OOO: Movie War Mega Max, Tsubasa split off from Nadeshiko and secretly attached himself to Emoto. When Emoto traveled to the M-BUS to maintain his Tachibana identity, Tsubasa found the people that Emoto kept in suspended animation, including Sarina Sonoda. Tsubasa mimicked her appearance and took on a repressed split personality that she had developed based on her childhood friend Tsubasa Amano (天野 ツバサ, Amano Tsubasa), who was killed in an accident following an argument they had.

Following Emoto and Mitsuaki Gamou's deaths, Fourze transports the people on the M-BUS back to Earth and unknowingly brings Tsubasa with him. Upon arriving, Tsubasa utilizes the "memory of the Kamen Riders" and technology based on the Fourze and Meteor Drivers to create his own Rider system and become Kamen Rider Ikaros (仮面ライダーイカロス, Kamen Raidā Ikarosu), naming himself after a Japanese experimental rocket of the same name that Sonoda dreamed of riding. Tsubasa also turns Hiroki Makise back into the Pyxis Zodiarts and creates the Carina, Puppis, and Vela Zodiarts from problem AGHS students to gather energy from their despair before fusing the four Zodiarts into the Argo Zodiarts. After absorbing Sonoda and Yuki's dreams, Tsubasa transforms into Beast Ikaros (獣イカロス, Kemono Ikarosu) and overwhelms Fourze until the latter brings the alien to space and defeats him, turning Tsubasa back into his SOLU form. Before returning to space, Tsubasa expresses a desire to befriend Fourze upon his return.
