= Kamen Rider Fourze the Movie: Space, Here We Come! =

- The shared poster for Fourze the Movie and Go-Busters the Movie

Japanese name
- Kanji: 仮面ライダーフォーゼ THE MOVIE みんなで宇宙キターッ！
Transcriptions
- Revised Hepburn: Kamen Raidā Fōze Za Mūbī Minna de Uchū Kitā!
- Directed by: Koichi Sakamoto
- Written by: Kazuki Nakashima
- Based on: Kamen Rider Fourze by Kazuki Nakashima
- Starring: Sota Fukushi; Ryuki Takahashi; Fumika Shimizu; Ryo Yoshizawa
- Cinematography: Koji Kurata
- Edited by: Hiroshi Sunaga
- Music by: Shuhei Naruse
- Production companies: Ishimori Productions; Toei
- Distributed by: Toei Co. Ltd
- Release date: August 4, 2012
- Running time: 66 minutes; 89 minutes (Director's cut)
- Country: Japan
- Language: Japanese

Kamen Rider Fourze the Movie: Space, Here We Come! (仮面ライダーフォーゼ THE MOVIE みんなで宇宙キターッ！, Kamen Raidā Fōze Za Mūbī Minna de Uchū Kitā!) is the theatrical film for the 2011-2012 Kamen Rider franchise drama Kamen Rider Fourze. The film was released on August 4, 2012, alongside the Super Sentai franchise film Tokumei Sentai Go-Busters the Movie: Protect the Tokyo Enetower!. The film also features the debut of the protagonist of Kamen Rider Wizard.

== Plot ==
A transaction between Mitsuaki Gamou and Foundation X goes awry after Inga Blink steals replica Horoscope Switches from them. Gamou orders his subordinates not to pursue her and chooses to have the Kamen Rider Club from Amanogawa High School (AGHS) do so instead.

The club meets with Shizuka Shirayama of OSTO Legacy, who requests their help. The club agrees, but while travelling to the organization, they are attacked by Inga and her robotic partner Black Knight. Club members Gentaro Kisaragi and Ryusei Sakuta fight them, but Inga destroys their van and wounds Ryusei before retreating with Black Knight. Despite this setback, the group reaches OSTO Legacy and meets its general manager, Harumi Saeba, who reveals Inga and Black Knight are members of the Alicia Federation, who created Cosmic Energy-powered androids called Kyodain. OSTO Legacy needs the club's help to destroy the federation's strongest Kyodain, XVII, though Gentaro intends to befriend it instead. After receiving astronaut and combat training, the club prepares to board the shuttle Exodus. Inga uses the Switches she stole to create simulacrums of the Horoscopes to stop them. As the others race to the shuttle, Gentaro and Ryusei stay behind to destroy most of the Horoscopes before Kamen Rider Wizard arrives to destroy the remaining simulacra and allow the pair to rejoin their friends.

Arriving at XVII, the club, Shirayama, and Saeba learn Inga and Black Knight stowed away on the Exodus before fighting them. While the club plants explosives, Ryusei and Tomoko Nozama discover Shirayama and Saeba lied to them. With their ruse exposed, Saeba and Shirayama assume their true forms: the Kyodain Groundain and Skydain. Inga reveals that her father Professor Blink created the Kyodain, who acquired sentience and killed him out of a sense of superiority before XVII locked them in human forms and trapped them on Earth. The Kyodain destroy XVII's mainframe to regain their full capabilities and attempt to kill the club.

While the club and Inga escape to the ship, Black Knight sacrifices himself to protect them while Gentaro and Ryusei battle the Kyodain. The androids overpower them before converting XVII into its robot form to attack Earth, but XVII saves the Riders and activates its self-destruct sequence to stop the Kyodain. Refusing to let XVII sacrifice himself, Gentaro expends his Rider powers to force the robot through a warp gate and onto the moon. He befriends XVII and stops him from self-destructing, but the Kyodain launch a counterattack. XVII sends them an email with specs for a new Astroswitch. The club gathers Gentaro's current Astroswitches, distributes them to everyone Gentaro befriended at AGHS, and convinces them to activate them all simultaneously, causing a chain reaction that creates the new Astroswitch. Gentaro uses it to fuse his Rider powers with Ryusei's, allowing him to overwhelm and destroy the Kyodain. After restoring his systems, XVII thanks the club before leaving to explore and find his place in the universe.

== Cast ==
- Gentaro Kisaragi (如月 弦太朗, Kisaragi Gentarō): Sota Fukushi (福士 蒼汰, Fukushi Sōta)
- Kengo Utahoshi (歌星 賢吾, Utahoshi Kengo): Ryuki Takahashi (高橋 龍輝, Takahashi Ryūki)
- Yuki Jojima (城島 ユウキ, Jōjima Yūki): Fumika Shimizu (清水 富美加, Shimizu Fumika)
- Miu Kazashiro (風城 美羽, Kazashiro Miu): Rikako Sakata (坂田 梨香子, Sakata Rikako)
- Shun Daimonji (大文字 隼, Daimonji Shun): Justin Tomimori (冨森 ジャスティン, Tomimori Jasutin)
- Tomoko Nozama (野座間 友子, Nozama Tomoko): Shiho (志保)
- JK (JK（ジェイク）, Jeiku): Shion Tsuchiya (土屋 シオン, Tsuchiya Shion)
- Ryusei Sakuta (朔田 流星, Sakuta Ryūsei): Ryo Yoshizawa (吉沢 亮, Yoshizawa Ryō)
- Inga Blink (インガ・ブリンク, Inga Burinku): Mikie Hara (原 幹恵, Hara Miki)
- Harumi Saeba (冴葉 晴海, Saeba Harumi): Kohki Okada (岡田 浩暉, Okada Kōki)
- Shizuka Shirayama (白山 静, Shirayama Shizuka): Ayumi Kinoshita (木下 あゆ美, Kinoshita Ayumi)
- Professor Blink (ブリンク博士, Burinku-hakase): Ken Nishida (西田 健, Nishida Ken)
- Kouhei Hayami (速水 公平, Hayami Kōhei): Kousei Amano (天野 浩成, Amano Kōsei)
- Kou Tatsugami (立神 吼, Tatsugami Kō): Kazutoshi Yokoyama (横山 一敏, Yokoyama Kazutoshi)
- Chuta Ohsugi (大杉 忠太, Ōsugi Chūta): Takushi Tanaka (田中 卓志, Tanaka Takushi; of Ungirls)
- Taneo Komatsu (小松 種夫, Komatsu Taneo): Yoshiaki Yamane (山根 良顕, Yamane Yoshiaki; of Ungirls)
- Mituaki Gamou (我望 光明, Gamō Mitsuaki): Shingo Tsurumi (鶴見 辰吾, Tsurumi Shingo)
- Female executive member of Foundation X (財団X, Zaidan Ekkusu): Ryo Narushima (成嶋 涼, Narushima Ryō)
- Announcer: Nanako Uemiya (上宮 菜々子, Uemiya Nanako; of TV Asahi announcer)
- XVII (エックスブイツー, Ekkusu Bui Tsū; Voice): Tsutomu Isobe (磯部 勉, Isobe Tsutomu)

Cameos

- Toshiya Miura (三浦 俊也, Miura Toshiya): Masanori Mizuno (水野 真典, Mizuno Masanori)
- Tamae Sakuma (佐久間 珠恵, Sakuma Tamae): Maria Yoshikawa (吉川 まりあ, Yoshikawa Maria)
- Jun Shigeno (繁野 ジュン, Shigeno Jun): Arisa Fujisaki (藤嵜 亜莉沙, Fujisaki Arisa)
- Chosuke Ban (番 長介, Ban Chōsuke): Takahiro Kuroishi (黒石 高大, Kuroishi Takahiro)
- Reiko Hirota (広田 玲子, Hirota Reiko): Yurika Tachibana (橘 ゆりか, Tachibana Yurika)
- Fumihiro Nitta (新田 文博, Nitta Fumihiro): Kiyotaka Uji (宇治 清高, Uji Kiyotaka)
- Teruhiko Satake (佐竹 輝彦, Satake Teruhiko): Ryūji Satō (佐藤 流司, Satō Ryūji)
- Tsuyoshi Satake (佐竹 剛, Satake Tsuyoshi): Satoshi Jinbo (神保 悟志, Jinbo Satoshi)
- Ritsuko Usaka (鵜坂 律子, Usaka Ritsuko): Hikari Kajiwara (梶原 ひかり, Kajiwara Hikari)
- Yuri Kuramochi (倉持 ゆり, Kuramochi Yuri): Miho Imamura (今村 美歩, Imamura Miho)
- Masami Okamura (岡村 雅美, Okamura Masami): Maika Suzuki (鈴木 米香, Suzuki Maika)
- Mr. Morota (諸田先生, Morota-sensei): Satoshi Morota (諸田 敏, Morota Satoshi)
- Hiroki Makise (牧瀬 弘樹, Makise Hiroki): Takafumi Shinohara (篠原 孝文, Shinohara Takafumi)
- Mari Yamamoto (山本 麻里, Yamamoto Mari): Natsumi Ishibashi (石橋 菜津美, Ishibashi Natsumi)
- Soshi Motoyama (元山 惣帥, Motoyama Sōshi): Ryutarou Akimoto (秋元 龍太朗, Akimoto Ryūtarō)
- Junta Abe (阿部 純太, Abe Junta): Tokimasa Tanabe (田辺 季正, Tanabe Tokimasa)
- Kimio Nonomura (野々村 公夫, Nonomura Kimio): Shohei Yamazaki (山崎 将平, Yamazaki Shōhei)
- Jin Nomoto (野本 仁, Nomoto Jin): Ryu Ando (安藤 龍, Andō Ryū)
- Haruka Utsugi (宇津木 遥, Utsugi Haruka): Nao Nagasawa (長澤 奈央, Nagasawa Nao)
- Norio Eguchi (江口 規夫, Eguchi Norio): Shugo Nagashima (永嶋 柊吾, Nagashima Shūgo)
- Misa Toriizaki (鳥居崎 ミサ, Toriizaki Misa): Kaya Asano (浅野 かや, Asano Kaya)
- Taro Bobuta (母部田 太朗, Bobuta Tarō): Yushi Oyakawa (親川 優志, Oyakawa Yūshi)
- Yayoi Tokuda (徳田 弥生, Tokuda Yayoi): Kasumi Suzuki (鈴木 かすみ, Suzuki Kasumi)
- Ran Kuroki (黒木 蘭, Kuroki Ran): Rin Honoka (ほのか りん, Honoka Rin)
- Haru Kusao (草尾 ハル, Kusao Haru): Jigen Araki (荒木 次元, Araki Jigen)
- Yukina Takamura (高村 優希奈, Takamura Yukina): Mika Akizuki (秋月 三佳, Akizuki Mika)
- Tojiro Goto (五藤 東次郎, Gotō Tōjirō): Ryousuke Kawamura (川村 亮介, Kawamura Ryōsuke)
- Suzumi Koda (甲田 鈴美, Kōda Suzumi): Airi Kido (城戸 愛莉, Kido Airi)
- Mina Otogawa (乙川 美奈, Otogawa Mina): Honoka Murakami (村上 穂乃佳, Murakami Honoka)
- Erin Suda (エリーヌ須田, Erīnu Suda): Karen Takizawa (滝沢 カレン, Takizawa Karen)
- Lem Kannagi (レム・カンナギ, Remu Kannagi): Toru Masuoka (益岡 徹, Masuoka Tōru; Archive footage)
- Kamen Rider Wizard (仮面ライダーウィザード, Kamen Raidā Wizādo; Voice): Shunya Shiraishi (白石 隼也, Shiraishi Shun'ya)
- WizarDriver (ウィザードライバー, Wizādoraibā; Voice): Hiroaki Hirata (平田 広明, Hirata Hiroaki)

== Theme songs ==
Main film theme

- "Voyagers"
  - Lyrics: Shoko Fujibayashi
  - Composition & Arrangement: COZZi
  - Artist: Anna Tsuchiya (土屋 アンナ, Tsuchiya Anna)

Insert Songs

- "Giant Step Rock'nRoll States edit"
  - Lyrics: Shoko Fujibayashi
  - Composition & Arrangement: Shuhei Naruse
  - Artist: Astronauts (May'n & Yoshiharu Shiina)
  A rock and roll remix of "Giant Step" makes its debut in the film, having never been used in the Kamen Rider Fourze broadcast run.
- "Switch On! Orchestra Version"
  A symphonic variation of "Switch On!" that was played in the TV series' final two episodes.
