= Kamen Rider × Kamen Rider Wizard & Fourze: Movie War Ultimatum =

Japanese name
- Kanji: 仮面ライダー×仮面ライダー ウィザード&フォーゼ MOVIE大戦アルティメイタム
Transcriptions
- Revised Hepburn: Kamen Raidā × Kamen Raidā Wizādo Ando Fōze Mūbī Taisen Arutimeitamu
- Directed by: Koichi Sakamoto
- Written by: Yoshio Urasawa (Kamen Rider Wizard, Movie War Ultimatum); Kazuki Nakashima (Kamen Rider Fourze)
- Produced by: Ishimori Productions; Toei
- Starring: Shunya Shiraishi; Makoto Okunaka; Junki Tozuka; Yuko Takayama; Mari Iriki; Sota Fukushi; Ryuki Takahashi; Fumika Shimizu; Ryo Yoshizawa; Erina Mano; Kenta Suga
- Cinematography: Koji Kurata
- Edited by: Hiroshi Sunaga
- Music by: Kōtarō Nakagawa; Shuhei Naruse
- Production company: Toei
- Distributed by: Toei Co. Ltd
- Release date: December 8, 2012
- Running time: 94 minutes; 117 minutes (Director's Cut)
- Country: Japan
- Language: Japanese
- Box office: US$13.1 million (Japan)

Kamen Rider × Kamen Rider Wizard & Fourze: Movie War Ultimatum (仮面ライダー×仮面ライダー ウィザード&フォーゼ MOVIE大戦アルティメイタム, Kamen Raidā × Kamen Raidā Wizādo Ando Fōze Mūbī Taisen Arutimeitamu) is a Japanese crossover superhero film featuring the main characters of Kamen Rider Wizard and Kamen Rider Fourze. It was released in Japan on December 8, 2012, as part of the annual winter "Movie War" franchise.

== Plot ==
=== Prologue ===
In 2012, Phantom leader Wiseman sends his subordinates Medusa and Phoenix to assist the Akumaizer – Zatan, Eil, and Gahra – in their plot to use five captive Gates' mana to create an army of monsters to seek revenge against humanity for driving them underground millennia ago. With their forces bolstered, Eil travels five years into the future to retrieve a device necessary for their plans.

=== Kamen Rider Fourze ===
In 2017, Interpol agents Ryusei Sakuta and Inga Blink defeat a group of psychic criminals working for Kageto Banba. Meanwhile, astronaut Yuki Jojima is returning to Earth from the International Space Station while her childhood friend and teacher, Gentaro Kisaragi, attempts to help his student Miyoko Ohki maintain the Space Kamen Rider Club, of which she is the only member. One of Kisaragi's students, Saburo Kazeta, and three of the latter's friends cause trouble with their psychic powers. Kisaragi and fellow teacher Haruka Utsugi try to stop Kazeta, who transforms into Sanagiman, receives the Zeber device from Banba to enhance his powers, and overpowers Kisaragi until Sakuta rescues Kisaragi and suggests they reunite the original Kamen Rider Club to help him.

Sometime later, Banba assembles other psychic teenagers to power the Zeber for the Akumaizer, claiming it is part of a crusade to stop space exploration and force Earth's governments to focus on terrestrial problems instead. While Kisaragi and his friends expose Banba and convince most of them to leave, Kazeta and his "Monster League" continue to stand by Banba. As Sakuta battles Banba and Kisaragi's friends subdue the league, Kisaragi confronts Kazeta, who claims it is too late for him because he is a monster. Kisaragi sacrifices his Fourze Driver and convinces Kazeta that he has the power to become someone else. Suddenly, Banba defeats Sakuta and kidnaps Ohki. Kazeta transforms into Inazuman to defeat Banba, but Eil steals the Zeber and damages Jojima's return module before returning to the present. Nadeshiko Misaki rescues Jojima before joining Kisaragi and Sakuta in pursuing Eil through time and borrowing the Fourze Driver from Kisaragi's present self.

=== Kamen Rider Wizard ===
In 2012, Haruto Soma destroys several of the Akumaizer's monsters before facing them. They overpower him, escape through a Gate's Underworld after Eil rejoins them, and order Medusa and Phoenix to stop Soma for them. They flee as they do not want to be associated with the Akumaizer. Soma pursues the trio while his friends Shunpei Nara and Rinko Daimon accidentally follow him and leave Koyomi behind. Soma, Nara, and Daimon find themselves in what appears to be their world with no memory of what happened. Everyone around them seems to be focused on preparing a birthday party for someone named Poitrine.

While exploring the streets, Soma finds a group of children being attacked by monsters. While Nara and Daimon get them to safety, Soma confronts the monsters when a young woman named Yu Kamimura arrives and transforms into Belle Mask Poitrine to defeat them. The monsters flee, but Kamimura says they must not be followed as they have abandoned the fight. While the children beg Daimon and Nara to remember the truth, the pair and Soma celebrate Kamimura's birthday. Soma awakens at the start of the day and remembers the truth. When the monsters attack the children again like last time, Soma destroys the monsters before Kamimura arrives. As she and the civilians harass him for doing so, he discovers that he, his friends, and the children are trapped in Kamimura's Underworld, which is connected to the Akumaizer's machine. Soma tries to rescue Kamimura, but Gahra stops him and convinces her to let Soma join her birthday party until Soma and the children bring her to her senses. Freed from the Akumaizer's control, Kamimura joins Soma in fighting Gahra until the other Akumaizer arrive, kidnap her, and send more monsters to stop Soma.

=== Movie War Ultimatum ===
As Kisaragi, Sakuta, and Misaki rescue Koyomi from monsters and travel to the Akumaizer's machine, Wiseman reveals to his subordinates that the Akumaizer plan to use the Zeber in an ocean of magic underneath Kamimura's Underworld to generate enough magic to kill humanity. After Koyomi explains the situation, Kisaragi uses a magic ring that he received in the past to grant himself and his allies entry into Kamimura's Underworld, arriving in time to save Soma. During the battle, Kisaragi recognizes Soma, but the latter does not reciprocate. Suddenly, the Akumaizer send their army to kill the Riders while they escape with Kamimura and the Zeber. Eiji Hino arrives to protect Koyomi from the machine, use his powers to reach the children, and give them Magic Rings that allow them to summon Kamen Riders OOO, Birth, W, and Accel to aid Soma, Kisaragi, Sakuta, and Misaki.

The eight Riders defeat the army before intercepting the Akumaizer and rescuing Kamimura, destroying Eil and Gahra in the process. Zatan makes a final attempt to fulfill his plans, but Kisaragi and Soma receive a power boost from their allies and destroy him with the Zeber. Returning from the Underworld, Kisaragi asks Soma to return the Fourze Driver to his present self before joining Sakuta and Misaki in returning to their time, where they learn Kazeta and his friends vow to dedicate themselves to fighting those who misuse their psychic powers as the Youth League. While freeing the Gates, Soma and his allies learn the children are unable to remember what happened while Kamimura, who Soma learns is the Doughnut Shop Hungry's effeminate male manager, retains his memories. As Soma returns the Fourze Driver to the present day Kisaragi, he also gives him the Magic Ring that Kisaragi will use in the future.

== Cast ==
Fourze cast

- Gentaro Kisaragi (如月 弦太朗, Kisaragi Gentarō): Sota Fukushi (福士 蒼汰, Fukushi Sōta)
- Kengo Utahoshi (歌星 賢吾, Utahoshi Kengo): Ryuki Takahashi (高橋 龍輝, Takahashi Ryūki)
- Yuki Jojima (城島 ユウキ, Jōjima Yūki): Fumika Shimizu (清水 富美加, Shimizu Fumika)
- Ryusei Sakuta (朔田 流星, Sakuta Ryūsei): Ryo Yoshizawa (吉沢 亮, Yoshizawa Ryō)
- Miu Kazashiro (風城 美羽, Kazashiro Miu): Rikako Sakata (坂田 梨香子, Sakata Rikako)
- Shun Daimonji (大文字 隼, Daimonji Shun): Justin Tomimori (冨森 ジャスティン, Tomimori Jasutin)
- Tomoko Nozama (野座間 友子, Nozama Tomoko): Shiho (志保)
- JK (JK（ジェイク）, Jeiku): Shion Tsuchiya (土屋 シオン, Tsuchiya Shion)
- Chuta Ohsugi (大杉 忠太, Ōsugi Chuta): Takushi Tanaka (田中 卓志, Tanaka Takushi; of Ungirls)
- Nadeshiko (なでしこ, Nadeshiko): Erina Mano (真野 恵里菜, Mano Erina)
- Inga Blink (インガ・ブリンク, Inga Burinku): Mikie Hara (原 幹恵, Hara Miki)
- Takashi Satake (佐竹 剛, Satake Takashi): Satoshi Jinbo (神保 悟志, Jinbo Satoshi)
- Mr. Morota (諸田先生, Morota-sensei): Satoshi Morota (諸田 敏, Morota Satoshi)
- Haruka Utsugi (宇津木 遥, Utsugi Haruka): Nao Nagasawa (長澤 奈央, Nagasawa Nao)
- Miyoko Ohki (大木 美代子, Ōki Miyoko): Rika Adachi (足立 梨花, Adachi Rika)
- Saburo Kazeta (風田 三郎, Kazeta Saburō): Kenta Suga (須賀 健太, Suga Kenta)
- Rumi Komaki (小牧 瑠美, Komaki Rumi): Kasumi Yamaya (山谷 花純, Yamaya Kasumi)
- Daita Kondo (近藤 大太, Kondō Daita): Kazuyoshi Nakazawa (中澤 兼利, Nakazawa Kazuyoshi)
- Chikao Nezu (根津 誓夫, Nezu Chikao): Yuya Hara (原 勇弥, Hara Yūya)
- Kageto Banba (番場 影人, Banba Kageto) Toshiya Toyama (遠山 俊也, Toyama Toshiya)
- Miu's manager: Kentarō Shimazu (島津 健太郎, Shimazu Kentarō)
- Gang boss: Chuck Johnson (チャック・ジョンソン, Chakku Jonson)
- Sports magazine reporter: Naomi Arai (荒井 奈緒美, Arai Naomi)
- Announcer: Naoko Kubota (久保田 直子, Kubota Naoko; of TV Asahi)

Wizard cast

- Haruto Soma (操真 晴人, Sōma Haruto): Shunya Shiraishi (白石 隼也, Shiraishi Shun'ya)
- Koyomi (コヨミ): Makoto Okunaka (奥仲 麻琴, Okunaka Makoto)
- Shunpei Nara (奈良 瞬平, Nara Shunpei): Junki Tozuka (戸塚 純貴, Tozuka Junki)
- Rinko Daimon (大門 凛子, Daimon Rinko): Yuko Takayama (高山 侑子, Takayama Yūko)
- Shigeru Wajima (輪島 繁, Wajima Shigeru): Hisahiro Ogura (小倉 久寛, Ogura Hisahiro)
- Misa (Medusa) (ミサ (メデューサ), Misa (Medyūsa)): Erina Nakayama (中山 絵梨奈, Nakayama Erina)
- Yugo (Phoenix) (ユウゴ (フェニックス), Yūgo (Fenikkusu)): Atsumi (篤海)
- Manager of donut shop: Kaba-chan (KABA.ちゃん)
- Worker at donut shop: Ryo Tayano (田谷野 亮, Tayano Ryō)
- Chief of police: Takayasu Komiya (小宮 孝泰, Komiya Takayasu)
- Yu Kamimura (上村 優, Kamimura Yū): Mari Iriki (入来 茉里, Iriki Mari)
- Young Saburo: Itsuki Shibuya (渋谷 樹生, Shibuya Itsuki)
- Young Rumi: Shiori Haga (芳賀 栞, Haga Shiori)
- Young Daita: Taiga Sakamoto (坂本 大河, Sakamoto Taiga)
- Young Chikao: Hidetoshi Akutsu (阿久津 秀寿, Akutsu Hidetoshi)
- Wiseman (ワイズマン, Waizuman; Voice): Toshio Furukawa (古川 登志夫, Furukawa Toshio)

Movie War Ultimatum cast

- Eiji Hino (火野 映司, Hino Eiji): Shu Watanabe (渡部 秀, Watanabe Shū)
- Zatan (ザタン; Voice): Demon Kakka (デーモン閣下, Dēmon Kakka)
- Eil (イール, Īru; Voice): Tomokazu Seki (関 智一, Seki Tomokazu)
- Gahra (ガーラ, Gāra; Voice): Yūji Mitsuya (三ツ矢 雄二, Mitsuya Yūji)
- Kamen Rider Beast (仮面ライダービースト, Kamen Raidā Bīsuto; Voice): Tasuku Nagase (永瀬 匡, Nagase Tasuku)
- Other Kamen Riders (Voice): Atsushi Tamaru (田丸 篤志, Tamaru Atsushi), Hideki Tasaka (田坂 秀樹, Tasaka Hideki), Junji Majima (間島 淳司, Majima Junji)
- O-Scanner Voice: Akira Kushida (串田 アキラ, Kushida Akira)
- Gaia Memory Voice: Fumihiko Tachiki (立木 文彦, Tachiki Fumihiko)

== Theme song ==
- "FOREST OF ROCKS"
  - Lyrics & Composition: H.E. Demon Kakka
  - Arrangement: Ai Ishigaki
  - Artist: Demon Kakka (デーモン閣下, Dēmon Kakka)

== Reception ==
The film grossed US$11.7 million in Japan.
