= Ryuki Takahashi =

Japanese actor (born 1993)

- 高橋 龍輝
- Born: March 28, 1993 (age 32); Miyagi Prefecture, Japan
- Occupation: Actor
- Years active: 2008–2016; 2019–present
- Height: 172 cm (5 ft 8 in)

Ryuki Takahashi (高橋 龍輝, Takahashi Ryūki; born 28 March 1993) is a Japanese actor. Takahashi was a member of the acting unit D-BOYS, produced by Watanabe Entertainment. He is well known for his role as Ryoma Echizen in 5th cast of "Tennis no Oujisama ~ Musicals". He retired from the entertainment industry for health reasons on June 30, 2016. However, in 2019, he returned to the entertainment industry by joining the band WIN=W1N.

== Filmography ==
=== TV series ===
Year	English title	Role	Network	Other notes
2011	Kamen Rider OOO	Kengo Utahoshi	TV Asahi	Tomorrow's Medals, Underwear, and Arms Held (final episode), cameo
2011	Kamen Rider Fourze	Kengo Utahoshi	TV Asahi	

=== Films ===
Year	Title	Role	Other notes
2009	High Kick Girl!	Ryousuke Nakama	
2011	Kamen Rider × Kamen Rider Fourze & OOO: Movie War Mega Max	Kengo Utahoshi	
2012	Kamen Rider × Super Sentai: Super Hero Taisen	Kengo Utahoshi	
2012	Kamen Rider Fourze the Movie: Everyone, Space Is Here!	Kengo Utahoshi	
2012	Kamen Rider × Kamen Rider Wizard & Fourze: Movie War Ultimatum	Kengo Utahoshi	
2013	Kamen Rider × Kamen Rider Gaim & Wizard: The Fateful Sengoku Movie Battle	Fourze Army Warlord	
2022	Haiiro no Kabe	Kojima	

=== Theatre ===
==== TENIMYU: THE PRINCE OF TENNIS MUSICAL SERIES (as Ryoma Echizen) ====
- The Prince of Tennis Musical: The Imperial Presence Hyotei Gakuen feat. Higa (2008) (he and the 5th Seigaku cast took turns performing with the 4th Seigaku cast during its overseas performances)
- The Prince of Tennis Musical: The Treasure Match Shitenhoji feat. Hyotei (2008–2009) (again, he and the 5th cast took turns performing the Seigaku roles)
- The Prince of Tennis Musical: Dream Live 6th (2009) (as this was the graduation show for the 4th cast, Ryuki and the 5th Seigaku cast now took over their roles as the next cast until Dream Live 7th)
- The Prince of Tennis Musical: The Final Match Rikkai feat. Shitenhoji (2009)
- The Prince of Tennis Musical: The Final Match Rikkai Second feat. Rivals (2009–2010)
- The Prince of Tennis Musical: Dream Live 7th (2010)

D-BOYS

- D-BOYS STAGE vol 3: Karasu 04
- D-BOYS: Natsudoko 2009
- D-BOYS STAGE vol 4: The Last Game
- D-BOYS STAGE 2011: The Merchant of Venice
