= Informa (novel) =

2022 novel by Garyo Okita

Informa is a crime novel by Garyo Okita, published on December 5, 2022 by Saizo Literature Club In 2023, it was made into a TV drama produced by Kansai Television and a manga. The series was released worldwide through Netflix. In October 2024 it was reported that a new season of the drama would be released on Abema. Season 2 of the drama is based on Informa II -Hit and Away- by Okita.

== Synopsis ==
Story 1
Weekly Magazine reporter Kanji Mishima is about to get fired from his gossip-seeking job. His only opportunity for redemption is Keijiro Kihara, a man well-versed in politics, entertainment and the underworld, known by the pseudonym "Informer". His life will change after this encounter.

Story 2
The story moves from Amagasaki, Japan, to Bangkok, Thailand, where the base of the new mafia organization Kihara and Mishima get face to face with, is located. This new group makes full use of SNS to commit crimes throughout Japan. In Thailand, an unexpected person emerges as their true enemy.

== TV series ==
Informa was made into a 10-episode series produced by Kansai Television, that aired from January 20 to March 24, 2023. It started distribution one week prior to on-air broadcast on Netflix Japan, and on March 17 was released on Netflix worldwide. The series features Kenta Kiritani in the main role and Generations' Reo Sano in the role of the reporter. A new season of the series, called Informa -Beasts Living in the Darkness-, started on November 7, 2024 on Abema. It was reported on December 30, 2024 that the 2nd. season would start airing on Netflix worldwide starting January 9, 2025.

=== Plot ===
Season 1
Weekly Times tabloid magazine reporter Kanji Mishima is on the verge of getting fired. He used to have a passion for journalism, but seeking celebrity gossip day after day has left him empty and jaded. One day, Mishima's editor-in-chief, Asuka Nagasawa, gives him the chance of a lifetime: the opportunity to fulfill his wish to see a world invisible to those who live a normal life. Mishima comes face-to-face with Keijiro Kihara. Kihara, former assistant to the Nishinomiya Shagukai yakuza underboss, has become an informant. He's an urban legend, an expert in all areas of the underworld, politics and entertainment, known to most as “Informa.” Kihara dubs Mishima “Clunker”, makes him his driver, and directs Mishima to a cabaret club in Shinjuku, where the hostess warns Mishima: “Don't die, Clunker Number Two”. Before Mishima can ask the meaning of this alarming statement, Kihara's phone rings with disturbing news. Kihara and Mishima rush to the scene to find a politician has been set on fire in a brutal act of murder. It's the first of many murders they will investigate in a world of mass-communication where information can be spread by anyone, and the ones with power are those who bury the truth.

=== Cast ===
(JP cast)

Season 1

- Keijiro Kihara (played by Kenta Kiritani (child: Kanasuke Yoshida)) Ex-yakuza turned informant Reprises role for season 2.
- Kanji Mishima (played by Generations' Reo Sano) Weekly Times gossip reporter who teams up with Kihara to discover and report on crimes Reprises role for season 2.

Weekly Times Editorial Department

- Asuka Nagasawa (played by Megumi) Mishima's boss, WT's Editor in chief
- Toru Hakozaki (played by Takashi Yamanaka) Mishima's senior, a veteran reporter. He's the one who tells Mishima about Kihara's driver, killed in an incident five years before
- Arimura (played by Ryoka Oshima) WT junior reporter.

Mysterious group

- Ryohei Saeki (played by Go Morita (child: Yoka Ichikawa)) adopted by Ishigami as an orphaned child, he became his mercenary. He was close to Kihara when they were younger.
- Hideki Okabayashi (played by Ryo Tajima) Saeki's associate. He was adopted by Ishigami as a child, and trained as a mercenary. He is very intelligent, and became the group's IT expert and hacker.
- Kim Sang-il (played by Wataru Ichinose) Saeki's associate. third generation Zainichi, he was adopted by Ishigami as a child, and trained as a mercenary. He is very strong, mainly responsible for subduing targets with physical strength.

Police

- Katsuji Maruyama (played by Kazuya Takahashi) Metropolitan Police Organized Crime Countermeasures Division detective. He exchanges information with Kihara
- Fumiaki Mizukoshi (played by Motoki Nishimura Metropolitan Police Organized Crime Countermeasures Division detective. He's a double agent between the police and the yakuza group, working with both.

Rokusha group

- Kyosuke Kawamura (played by Yasushi Fuchikami) Group leader. Admires Kihara as a "big brother". Seeks vengeance for his brother Ainosuke.
- Kuzuo (played by Ryutaro Ninomiya) Kawamura's apprentice. Tries to save Kawamura, who has been kidnapped by the mysterious group.
- Shigeo (played by Haruto Fujii) Kawamura's apprentice. He drives the car to "M", the supposed meeting place where Kawamura is to be released.

Takizawa group

- Rikiya Takizawa (played by Tetsuya Chiba) Group leader. Hired by Kihara as lure for a trap for the mysterious group.
- Aida (played by Hannya) Group leader's "Right-hand woman", she came into conflict between the Rokusha group and Kihara, but when she learns about Kawamura's abduction, offers to help to get him back.

Other

- Nana (played by Kana Kita A hostess in Kabukicho. Cooperates with Kihara offering information.
- Takemori (played by Takayuki Hamatsu) Manager of the pet store "American Dog". His store is a front for a criminal business.
- Kento Ishigami (played by Renji Ishibashi) Former Minister of Land, Infrastructure, Transport and Tourism. Founder of "Ishigami House", housing and mercenary training facility. Identified as being responsible of the Fireball Incident.
- Kawamata (played by Ichirota Miyakawa) Provides information to Kihara in accordance with Ishigami's intention to confront Kihara with Saeki.
- Akiho (played by Rin Honoka) Nana's colleague hostess.
- Ainosuke Kawamura (played by Ryusei Yokohama) Kyosuke Kawamura's younger brother. Nana's boyfriend. Kihara's apprentice. He was Kihara's first driver and assistant.

Season 2

- Ryunosuke Takano (played by Kazunari Ninomiya) A police bureaucrat who becomes involved in the investigation of the "illegal part-time job murder case".
- Hirose (played by Riko) A Thai correspondent for the Weekly Times. She respects Mishima as a reporter. and was inspired by him.
- Takuma Onizuka (played by Hiroyuki Ikeuchi)
