= Fumika Shimizu =

Japanese actress and gravure model (born 1994)

- 清水富美加
- Born: 2 December 1994 (age 31); Tokyo, Japan
- Other names: Yoshiko Sengen
- Occupations: Actress; gravure model
- Years active: 2008–present
- Agent: ARI Production

Fumika Shimizu (清水 富美加, Shimizu Fumika; born 2 December 1994) is a Japanese actress, gravure idol and model. In February 2017, she announced her temporary retirement from the entertainment industry to join the controversial Happy Science religion, declaring she had been a member of the group since childhood under the influence of her parents, both of whom have been devout believers in Happy Science for a long time. Through Happy Science, she announced a return to acting under her new name Yoshiko Sengen (千眼 美子, Sengen Yoshiko) with Happy Science's ARI Production company. In the same month, Kana-Boon's Yuma Meshida apologized for being in an adulterous relationship with her.

Shimizu had her first major role as Yuki Jojima in Kamen Rider Fourze followed by appearances as Aiko Himeno in HK!!! Hentai Kamen and in NHK's Mare.

== Filmography ==
=== TV series ===
Year	English title	Role	Network	Other notes	Ref.
2010	Atsui zo! Nekogaya!!	Kaoruko Toda	NBN		
2011	Kamen Rider OOO	Yuki Jojima	TV Asahi	Final episode: Tomorrow's Medals, Underwear, and Arms Held, cameo	
2011–2012	Kamen Rider Fourze	Yuki Jojima, Dark Yuki	TV Asahi		
2013	Real Onigokko: The Origin	Ai Sato	tvk		
2013	Toshi Densetsu no Onna Season 2	Yui Kagami	TV Asahi	Episode 5: Toilet no Hanako-san	
2014	Magical Boy Cherry's	Kasumi Kinoshita	TV Tokyo		
2014	Funeral Procession of Peter	Mei Maeno	TBS		
2014	Seijo	Miharu Tanaka	NHK		
2014	Koi no Gasshuku Menkyo!	Rena Kagaya	Fuji TV		
2015	Mare	Ichiko Kuramoto	NHK	92nd Asadora	
2015	Tonari no Seki-kun	Rumi Yokoi	MBS, TBS	Live-action adaptation	
2015	Okaasan, Ore wa Daijoubu	Naoko Norikawa	NTV	24 Hour Television telethon drama special	
2015	Kōnodori	Natsuki Yano	TBS	Live-action adaptation, episode 1	
2015	Ichiko no Koi	Ichiko Kuramoto	NHK BS Premium	Mare spinoff	
2016	Suteki na Sen Taxi Special	Yaeko Kanemoto	Kansai TV		
2016	Sekai Ichi Muzukashii Koi	Mahiro Hori	NTV		
2016	Eiko Kyoju no Jikenbo	Kaoruko Ueno, Sakurako Unobe	TV Asahi		
2016	Mohouhan	Yumiko Takai	TV Asahi		
2016	Kaseifu no Mitazono	Emiri Hanada	TV Asahi		
2017	Byplayers	Herself	TV Tokyo	Episode 4	
2017	Laughing Lucky Cats	Hitomi Takagi	MBS	Lead role	

=== Anime ===
Year	Title	Role	Network	Other notes	Ref.
2017	The Dragon Dentist	Nonoko Kishii	NHK BS Premium		

=== Films ===
Year	Title	Role	Other notes	Ref.
2010	Tobe! Kobato		Short film	
2011	Avatar	Takami Yamane		
2011	Kamen Rider OOO Wonderful: The Shogun and the 21 Core Medals	Yuki Jojima	cameo	
2011	Kamen Rider × Kamen Rider Fourze & OOO: Movie War Mega Max	Yuki Jojima		
2012	Kamen Rider × Super Sentai: Super Hero Taisen	Yuki Jojima		
2012	Kamen Rider Fourze the Movie: Everyone, Space Is Here!	Yuki Jojima		
2012	Kamen Rider × Kamen Rider Wizard & Fourze: Movie War Ultimatum	Yuki Jojima		
2013	HK!!! Hentai Kamen	Aiko Himeno		
2013	Seki Seki Ren Ren	Midori		
2015	Furiko	Young Saki		
2015	Ryuzo and the Seven Henchmen	Yuriko		
2016	Asahan no Yuge	Fūka		
2016	Hentai Kamen: Abnormal Crisis	Aiko Himeno		
2017	Ankoku Joshi	Sayuri Sumikawa		
2017	Laughing Lucky Cats	Hitomi Takagi	Lead role	
2017	Tokyo Ghoul	Touka Kirishima		
2018	Saraba Seishun, Saredo Seishun.		Happy Science film	
2019	The Last White Witch	Fuka	Lead role, Happy Science film	
2019	Immortal Hero	Saori	Happy Science film	
2020	The Real Exorcist	Sayuri	Lead role, Happy Science film	
2020	Twiceborn	Miho Tachibana	Happy Science film	
2021	Beautiful Lure	Kayo Matsuda	Special appearance, Happy Science film	
2021	The Laws of the Universe: The Age of Elohim	Yaizael (voice)	Happy Science anime film	
