= Shunya Shiraishi =

Japanese actor (born 1990)

- Shiraishi at the 39th Tokyo International Film Festival
- Born: August 3, 1990 (age 36); Kanagawa Prefecture, Japan
- Occupation: Actor
- Years active: 2008 - present
- Website: https://shunyashiraishi.com/

Shunya Shiraishi (白石 隼也, Shiraishi Shun'ya; born August 3, 1990) is a Japanese actor, best known for his role as Haruto Soma, the main character of the Kamen Rider Wizard tokusatsu series. He finished second at Junon Super Boy Contest 2007. He is also known for his role as Hisashi Uehara in the Netflix series Good Morning Call.

== Filmography ==
=== TV series ===
Year	Title	Role	Other notes	Ref.
2012	Kamen Rider Fourze	Haruto Soma	Final episode	
2012	Kamen Rider Wizard	Haruto Soma/Kamen Rider Wizard	Leading role	
2016	Sanada Maru	Kimura Shigenari	Taiga drama	
2016	Good Morning Call	Hisashi Uehara	Leading role	
2024	Love Is Better the Second Time Around	Kyosuke Sugimoto		
2025	The Hot Spot	Mitsuru Onodera		

=== Films ===
Year	Title	Role	Other notes	Ref.
2008	Uniform SurviGirl II	Yuhei Aita		
2012	Kamen Rider Fourze the Movie: Space, Here We Come!	Haruto Soma/Kamen Rider Wizard	Voice cameo	
2012	Kamen Rider × Kamen Rider Wizard & Fourze: Movie War Ultimatum	Haruto Soma/Kamen Rider Wizard	Leading role	
2013	Kamen Rider × Super Sentai × Space Sheriff: Super Hero Taisen Z	Haruto Soma/Kamen Rider Wizard		
2013	Kamen Rider Wizard in Magic Land	Haruto Soma/Kamen Rider Wizard	Leading role	
2013	Kamen Rider × Kamen Rider Gaim & Wizard: The Fateful Sengoku Movie Battle	Haruto Soma/Kamen Rider Wizard	Leading role	
2014	Heisei Riders vs. Shōwa Riders: Kamen Rider Taisen feat. Super Sentai	Haruto Soma/Kamen Rider Wizard		
2018	No Matter How Much My Mom Hates Me	Taisho		
2021	1921	Eizo Kondo	Chinese Film	
2026	The Canary's Lullaby	Yanagi	Taiwanese-Japanese film	
