= Rin Honoka =

Japanese actress and model

- ほのか りん
- Born: 4 October 1996 (age 30); Kanagawa Prefecture
- Other names: Rin (リン); Lynn Honoka
- Occupations: Model; singer; actress; tarento
- Years active: 2009–present
- Style: Fashion
- Height: 165 cm (5 ft 5 in)
- Musical career
- Label: Fujipacific Music
- Website: Official website

Rin Honoka (ほのか りん, Honoka Rin; born 4 October 1996), also known as Lynn Honoka, is a Japanese fashion model, singer, actress, and tarento. She has previously been represented by GMB Production and Zest.

== Filmography ==
=== Variety programmes that appeared in the past ===
Year	Title	Network	Ref.
2011	R no Hōsoku	NHK E	
2012	Hōgen Kanojo. 0 (Love)	ToMeiHan Net 6	

=== Internet dramas ===
Year	Title	Role	Website
2012	Secret Girls	Jo	Misanga

=== TV dramas ===
Year	Title	Role	Network	Ref.
2012	Kamen Rider Fourze	Ran Kuroki / Pisces Zodiarts	TV Asahi	
2014	Kagaku Drama Taishō Scenario Bumon Jushō-saku Seishun Fleming	Kana Iwasaki	BS Fuji	
2016	Kamen Rider Ghost	Ako	TV Asahi	
2023	Informa	Akiho	KTV	

=== Stage ===
Year	Title	Role
2009	Anne of Green Gables	Anne's friend
2011	Alice in Chrono Paradox	Yoshino Hasegawa
2012	Lychee Light Club	Kanon

=== TV anime ===
Year	Title	Role	Network
2012	Litchi DE Hikari Club	Kanon	Tokyo MX

=== Films ===
Year	Title	Role	Ref.
2010	Chime	Yoshi	
2012	Kamen Rider Fourze the Movie: Space, Here We Come!	Ran Kuroki (cameo)	
2014	Gekijōban Zero		
2015	Shiromajo Gakuen: Owalit Hajimari	Machiko	
2015	Real Onigokko	Hatsu	
2023	Wheels and Axle		

== Bibliography ==
=== Magazine serialisations ===
Year	Title
2010	Hana*chu
2010	Disney Fan
2011	Nicola
2012	Ciao

=== Mook ===
Year	Title	ISBN
2010	I Love Tokyo Disney Resort 2011	ISBN 978-4063500769
2012	Repipi Armario Brand Oshare Book	ISBN 4107902358
