= Rikako Sakata =

Japanese actress and model (born 1993)

- 坂田 梨香子
- Born: December 16, 1993 (age 32); Saga, Saga Prefecture, Japan
- Occupations: Model, actress
- Years active: 2006–present
- Height: 167 cm (5 ft 6 in)

Rikako Sakata (坂田 梨香子, Sakata Rikako; born December 16, 1993, in Saga, Saga Prefecture, Japan) is a Japanese actress and model who is affiliated with Ever Green Entertainment.

== Biography ==
In April 2006, Sakata won the Grand Prix at the exclusive model audition for the fashion magazine, Love Berry, the same year on June 1, she became an exclusive model in its July issue. She appeared in many commercials, dramas, and theater plays. In April 2009, Sakata went to a Tokyo high school. Along with it, she moved to Tokyo. Although her desire for Tokyo was from her sophomore high school, there was also opposition from her things, family, and staff Sakata was not solidified, and that could not be moved to Tokyo for junior high school. She graduated from Love Berry on its June 2010 issue, the same year in July, she was a model for Seventeen. In March 2012, Sakata graduated from high school. In April 2013, she graduated from Seventeen. The same year in May, she was an exclusive model for CanCam.

== Filmography ==
=== TV series ===
Year	Title	Role	Network	Other notes
2011	Kamen Rider Fourze	Miu Kazashiro	TV Asahi	
2011	Switch Girl!!	Hara Nino	Fuji TV Two	
2013	Yae no Sakura	Miyako Ise	NHK	
2020	Kishiryu Sentai Ryusoulger	Miya	TV Asahi	Episode 41

=== Films ===
Year	Title	Role	Other notes
2007	Calling You	Miki Aihara	
2010	Maria-sama ga Miteru	Rei Hasekura	
2011	Kamen Rider × Kamen Rider Fourze & OOO: Movie War Mega Max	Miu Kazashiro	
2012	Kamen Rider × Super Sentai: Super Hero Taisen	Miu Kazashiro	
2012	Kamen Rider Fourze the Movie: Space, Here We Come!	Miu Kazashiro	
2012	Kamen Rider × Kamen Rider Wizard & Fourze: Movie War Ultimatum	Miu Kazashiro	
