= Shiho (actress) =

Actress and model

- Born: Shiho Yamagishi; October 19, 1992 (age 33); Gunma Prefecture, Japan
- Other name: しーたん (Shi-tan)
- Years active: 2004–present
- Modeling information
- Height: 1.52 m (5 ft 0 in)

Shiho (志保; born October 19, 1992 in Gunma Prefecture) is an actress and model. Her agency is Stardust Promotion.

== Filmography ==
=== TV ===
- Charming - Nana Sakamaki (坂巻奈々, Sakamaki Nana) (2005)
- Be with You - Mariko Nagase(Teenage) (永瀬万里子(中学時代), Nagase Mariko(Teenage)) (2005)
- One Night R&R (ワンナイR&R) - (2005 - 2006)
- 1 Litre no Namida - Mami Takahashi (高橋マミ, Takahashi Mami) (2006)
- Kinyō Entertainment (金曜エンタテイメント) - Daughter of Akiko Yajima (矢島亜希子の娘, Daughter of Yajima Akiko) (2006)
- Purimadamu (プリマダム) - Mai Manda (万田結, Manda Mai) (2006)
- Kinyō Entertainment (金曜エンタテイメント) - fuu Shochiku (松竹楓, Shochiku fuu) (2006)
- Tokyo Girls - Path of short film (東京少女 ショートフィルム道) - Daughter of Taro Suwa (諏訪太朗の娘, Daughter of Suwa Taro) (2006)
- Koisuru nichiyōbi 3rd Series (恋する日曜日 第3シリーズ) - Megumi (めぐみ) (2007)
- Kinyō Prestige (金曜プレステージ) - fuu Shochiku (松竹楓, Shochiku fuu) (2007)
- Thrill night - kosodate no tensai (スリルな夜・子育ての天才) - Mio Kamiya (神谷美緒, Kamiya Mio) (2007)
- Doyō Wide Theater - Law firm of Yumiko Benten 1 ' (土曜ワイド劇場 弁天祐美子法律事務所 1) - Makoto Benten (弁天真実, Benten Makoto) (2007)
- Sensei dō - Pistol sensei (先生道 - ピストル先生) - Tanaka (田中) (2007)
- Half a Confession - Miki Shiki (志木美紀, Shiki Miki) (2007)
- Tokyo Girls - Nanami Sakuraba (東京少女 桜庭ななみ) - Mariko (マリコ) (2008)
- Kinyō Prestige (金曜プレステージ) - fuu Shochiku (松竹楓, Shochiku fuu) (2008)
- Tokyo Girls - Azusa Okamoto (東京少女 岡本あずさ) - Reika Mizuhashi (水橋レイカ, Mizuhashi Reika) (2008)
- Zeni Geba (銭ゲバ) - Haruko Kuwata (桑田春子, Kuwata Haruko) (2009)
- Next - Sachi Kawakami (川上サチ, Kawakami Sachi) (2009)
- Otomen - Summer - Yurippe (ユリッペ) (2009)
- Otomen - Autumn - Yurippe (ユリッペ) (2009)
- Doyō Wide Theater - Law firm of Yumiko Benten 2 (土曜ワイド劇場 弁天祐美子法律事務所 2) - Makoto Benten (弁天真実, Benten Makoto) (2009)
- The Wallflower - Nana (なな) (2010)
- Zettai Reido - Shouko Honya (本谷翔子, Honya Shouko) (2010)
- Moteki - Naoko Hoyashida(Teenage) (林田尚子(中学生時代), Hoyashida Naoko(Teenage)) (2010)
- Lady - Last crime profile (LADY〜最後の犯罪プロファイル〜) - Yumiko Sakashita (坂下裕美子, Sakashita Yumiko) (2011)
- Kamen Rider Fourze - Tomoko Nozama (野座間友子, Nozama Tomoko) (2011 - 2012)
- Strawberry Night (ストロベリーナイト) - Chika (千香) (2012)
- Resident: Gonin no kenshuui (レジデント〜5人の研修医) - Haruka Aida (相田遥, Aida Haruka) (2012)
- Miyuki Miyabe mystery - Perfect Blue (宮部みゆきミステリー パーフェクト・ブルー) - Akemi Itou (伊東あけみ, Itou Akemi) (2012)
- Switch Girl 2 (スイッチガール!!2) - Runa Midou (御堂ルナ, Midou Runa) (2012)
- Otomesan (おトメさん) - Emiri (エミリ) (2013)
- Shuden Byebye (終電バイバイ) - Clerk of karaoke (カラオケの店員) (2013)
- Seventeen killer (セブンティーンキラー) - Kaoruko (薫子) (2013)
- Suiyō Mystery 9 - Writer of detective・Misa Yamamura 3 (水曜ミステリー9 作家探偵・山村美紗3) - Touhana (豆花) (2013)
- No coin・Kid 〜History of our game〜 (ノーコン・キッド 〜ぼくらのゲーム史〜) (2013)
- Giga Tokyo Toy Box (大東京トイボックス) - Hanako Honda (半田花子, Honda Hanako) (2014)

=== Net movies ===
- Blizzard (ブリザード) - Nanase Kozima (小嶋七瀬, Kozima Nanase) (2011)
- Kamen Rider × Super Sentai: Super Hero Taihen - Tomoko Nozama (野座間友子, Nozama Tomoko) (2012)
- Kamen Rider Fourze: Everyone, Class Is Here! - Tomoko Nozama (野座間友子, Nozama Tomoko) (2012)

=== Movies ===
- Kazuo Umezu Horror Movie - Girl of the plaque (楳図かずおの恐怖劇場 「まだらの少女」) - Satomi (聡美) (2005)
- Hontou ni Atta Kowai Hanashi 3D - shisen (ほんとうにあった怖い話3D「シセン」) - Kaori (佳織) (2010)
- Gyakuten no Cinderella (逆転のシンデレラ) - Ki (希) (2010)
- Kamen Rider × Kamen Rider Fourze & OOO: Movie War Mega Max - Tomoko Nozama (野座間友子, Nozama Tomoko) (2011)
- Kamen Rider × Super Sentai: Super Hero Taisen - Tomoko Nozama (野座間友子, Nozama Tomoko) (2012)
- Kamen Rider Fourze the Movie: Everyone, Space Is Here! - Tomoko Nozama (野座間友子, Nozama Tomoko) (2012)
- Kamen Rider × Kamen Rider Wizard & Fourze: Movie War Ultimatum - Tomoko Nozama (野座間友子, Nozama Tomoko) (2012)
- Minasan Sayounara (みなさん、さようなら) (2013)
- Toshiue no Hito (年上ノ彼女) - Ageha Osanai (小山内揚羽, Osanai Ageha) (2014)

=== Radio ===
- Bakumatsu Sanshimai (幕末三姉妹) - Seiki (星姫) (2011)

=== Music videos ===
- Brahman - "A White Deep Morning" (2004)
- GReeeeN - "Aiuta" (2007)
- Tomofumi Tanizawa (タニザワトモフミ, Tanizawa Tomofumi) - "Kimi ni Todoke" (2009)
- GReeeeN - "Tabibito" (2010)
- Universe - "Echoes" (2010)
- Daigo - "Ima Aitakute..." (2013)

== Works ==
=== DVD ===
- Tokyo Girls - Nanami Sakuraba (東京少女 桜庭ななみ) (2009)
- GReeeeN - 《これ、PVでSHOWっ！！？？》 (2009)
- Otomen - Summer (オトメン(乙男)〜夏〜) (2009)
- Otomen - Autumn (オトメン(乙男)〜秋〜) (2009)
- Kamen Rider Fourze DVD＆Blu-ray (2012)
- Shiho no koto (志保のこと) (2012)
- Toshiue no Hito (年上ノ彼女) (2014)

=== Books ===
- Photo-book《SHIHO》 (志保) (2012)
