= Ungirls =

Japanese comedy duo

- Angāruzu (アンガールズ)
- Employer: Watanabe Entertainment

Comedy career
- Years active: 2002–
- Genre: Conte
- Members: Yoshiaki Yamane (Boke); Takushi Tanaka (Tsukkomi)

Ungirls (アンガールズ, Angāruzu) is a Japanese comedy duo (kombi) consisting of Takushi Tanaka and Yoshiaki Yamane. They have featured on a number of television shows. The duo are employed by Watanabe Entertainment, and are mainly active in Tokyo.

== Members ==
- Takushi Tanaka, Born February 8, 1976 in Fuchū, Hiroshima. Plays the tsukkomi and writes all their Manzai material. He is a graduate of Hiroshima University with a specialization in architecture.
- Yoshiaki Yamane, Born May 27, 1976 in Asaminami-ku, Hiroshima. Plays the boke. He is a graduate of Hiroshima Shudo University with a specialization in political science.

== Career ==
Tanaka and Yamane met each other at a travel focused circle in university and became friends with similar hobbies. Tanaka moved to Tokyo in early 2000, and Yamane followed one month after. At the time, both of them had a different comedic partner at the time, but after a few months in Tokyo, they left their former units and formed Ungirls. After successfully passing the audition for Watanabe Entertainment, the unit officially formed and began activities in 2002.

From 2004 and onward, Ungirls appeared on various variety shows and were known for their unique "gross" and "unsettling" characters. The name "Ungirls" is also derived from having no chance or luck with girls due to their outer appearance, hence adding "Un" to "girls" to form the name.

In 2017, Ungirls made it as a finalist in King of Conte 2017.
