= List of Kamen Rider Wizard characters =

Kamen Rider Wizard (仮面ライダーウィザード, Kamen Raidā Wizādo) is a Japanese tokusatsu series that serves as the 23rd installment in the Kamen Rider franchise and the 14th entry in the Heisei era.

== Main characters ==
=== Haruto Soma ===
Haruto Soma (操真 晴人, Sōma Haruto) is a misunderstood former soccer player and one of several individuals who possess the potential to perform magic, or Gates (ゲート, Gēto), who abandoned his dream of going pro after injuring his best friend and teammate, Kazuya Shinozaki, during a tryout. Due to his status as a Gate, Sou Fueki kidnapped Haruto and several others like him and subjected them to the Sabbath ritual in a failed attempt to revive his deceased daughter, Koyomi. While the ritual created Phantoms instead, Haruto was able to stop his inner Phantom, WizarDragon, from turning him through force of will and became part of a small group of survivors who unlocked their magical capabilities as a result. Immediately afterward, Fueki assumed the identity of the White Wizard and gave Haruto the means to become Kamen Rider Wizard, tasking him with combating the Phantoms and looking after Koyomi. Motivated by a desire to provide hope to people who have fallen into despair and now finding mundane life boring, Haruto takes up residence in the antiques shop Omokagedō to gain more Wizard Rings (ウィザードリング, Wizādo Ringu) to bolster his powers and christens himself a Kamen Rider, though he finds solace in his love of doughnuts and frequents the Donut Shop Hungry to satiate this desire. As of the tie-in novel Novel: Kamen Rider Wizard, Haruto married friend and ally, Rinko Daimon.

Utilizing one of several left-handed Transformation Rings (変身リング, Henshin Ringu) in conjunction with the WizarDriver (ウィザードライバー, Wizādoraibā) belt, Haruto can transform into the "Ringed Wizard" (指輪の魔法使い, Yubiwa no Mahōtsukai), Kamen Rider Wizard, whose signature finisher is the Strike Wizard (ストライクウィザード, Sutoraiku Wizādo) via the Kick Strike (キックストライク, Kikku Sutoraiku) Ring. While transformed, he possesses a series of right-handed Magic Rings (魔法リング, Mahō Ringu), which allow him to perform different spells, and wields the WizarSwordGun (ウィザーソードガン, Wizāsōdogan), which has a Gun Mode (ガンモード, Gan Mōdo) for performing the Shooting Strike (シューティングストライク, Shūtingu Sutoraiku) finisher and a Sword Mode (ソードモード, Sōdo Mōdo) for performing the Slash Strike (スラッシュストライク, Surasshu Sutoraiku) finisher. His personal vehicle is the Machine Winger (マシンウィンガー, Mashin Wingā) motorcycle, which can combine with the Machine Winger to form the Winger WizarDragon (ウィンガーウィザードラゴン, Wingā Wizādoragon). He can also use other Transformation Rings to alternate between varying Style (スタイル, Sutairu) forms, which are as follows:

- Flame Style (フレイムスタイル, Fureimu Sutairu): Haruto's ruby-themed default form accessed from the Flame (フレイム, Fureimu) Ring that grants pyrokinesis and superhuman agility. During the final battle with Sora Takigawa, Haruto uses the Hope (ホープ, Hōpu) Ring, which is created from the Philosopher's Stone, to perform an enhanced version of this form's Strike Wizard called the Empowered Strike Wizard (強化ストライクウィザード, Kyōka Sutoraiku Uizādo).
- Water Style (ウォータースタイル, Wōtā Sutairu): A sapphire-themed auxiliary form accessed from the Water (ウォーター, Wōtā) Ring that grants hydrokinesis and underwater breathing capabilities. In this form, Haruto can use the Liquid (リキッド, Rikiddo) Ring to liquefy himself.
- Hurricane Style (ハリケーンスタイル, Harikēn Sutairu): An emerald-themed auxiliary form accessed from the Hurricane (ハリケーン, Harikēn) Ring that grants aerokinesis and levitation capabilities.
- Land Style (ランドスタイル, Rando Sutairu): A yellow citrine-themed auxiliary form accessed from the Land (ランド, Rando) Ring that grants geokinesis and superhuman strength. In this form, Haruto can use the Drill (ドリル, Doriru) Ring to burrow underground.
- Infinity Style (インフィニティースタイル, Infinitī Sutairu): Haruto's diamond-themed final form accessed from the Infinity (インフィニティ, Infiniti) Ring that grants superhuman durability and speed. In this form, he summons WizarDragon into the human world to wield him as the Axcalibur (アックスカリバー, Akkusukaribā) sword, which can switch between Calibur Mode (カリバーモード, Karibā Mōdo) and Axe Mode (アックスモード, Akkusu Mōdo). His finishers in this form are the (Plasma) Dragon Shining ((プラズマ) ドラゴンシャイニング, (Purazuma) Doragon Shainingu) via the Axcalibur and the Infinity Strike Wizard (インフィニティストライクウィザード, Infiniti Sutoraiku Wizādo) via the Kick Strike Ring.

Additionally, Haruto can access WizarDragon's power to evolve his Styles into Dragon Style (ドラゴンスタイル, Doragon Sutairu) forms, which allow him to either manifest WizarDragon's body parts via the Special (スペシャル, Supesharu) Ring or perform the Dragon Strike Wizard (ドラゴンストライクウィザード, Doragon Sutoraiku Wizādo) finisher via the Kick Strike Ring. He can also use Magic Rings on the WizarSwordGun, such as the Copy (コピー, Kopī) Ring to produce a second for dual wielding or the Big (ビッグ, Biggu) Ring to enlarge said weapon.

- Flame Dragon (フレイムドラゴン, Fureimu Doragon): The evolved form of Flame Style accessed from the eponymous Wizard Ring that increases the pyrokinetic abilities of the original form. In this form, Haruto can use either the Special Ring to manifest the chest-mounted Drago Skull (ドラゴスカル, Dorago Sukaru), which allows him to perform the Dragon Breath (ドラゴンブレス, Doragon Buresu) finisher, or the wristwatch-like Drago Timer (ドラゴタイマー, Dorago Taimā) bracelet to summon three copies of his other Dragon Styles for combat assistance.
  - All Dragon (オールドラゴン, Ōru Doragon): An enhanced version of Flame Dragon and Haruto's super form accessed from the Drago Timer in conjunction with the WizarDriver that combines the powers of his four Dragon Styles, allowing him to manifest the chest-mounted All Drago Skull (オールドラゴスカル, Ōru Dorago Sukaru), the All Drago Tail (オールドラゴテイル, Ōru Dorago Teiru), a pair of All Drago Wings (オールドラゴウィング, Ōru Dorago Uingu), and a pair of All Drago Hell Claws (オールドラゴヘルクロー, Ōru Dorago Heru Kurō) at once. His finisher in this form is the All Dragon Burst (オールドラゴンバースト, Ōru Doragon Bāsuto).
  - Special Rush (スペシャルラッシュ, Supesharu Rasshu): An enhanced version of Flame Dragon accessed from the eponymous Wizard Ring that allows Haruto to manifest the chest-mounted Rush Skull (ラッシュスカル, Rasshu Sukaru), the Rush Tail (ラッシュテイル, Rasshu Teiru), a pair of Rush Wings (ラッシュウィング, Rasshu Wingu), and a pair of Rush Hell Claws (ラッシュヘルクロー, Rasshu Heru Kurō) at once. His finisher in this form is the Special Dragon Rush (スペシャルドラゴンラッシュ, Supesharu Doragon Rasshu) via the Kick Strike Ring. This form appears exclusively in the crossover film Kamen Rider × Kamen Rider Wizard & Fourze: Movie War Ultimatum.
  - Beast Mantle (ビーストマント, Bīsuto Manto): An enhanced version of Flame Dragon accessed from the Falco and Buffa Rings that clads Haruto in the Falco and Buffa Mantles. His finisher in this form is the Chimera Wizard Tackle (キメラウィザードタックル, Kimera Wizādo Takkuru). This form appears exclusively in the Hyper Battle DVD special Kamen Rider Wizard: Showtime with the Dance Ring!!.
- Water Dragon (ウォータードラゴン, Wōtā Doragon): The evolved form of Water Style accessed from the eponymous Wizard Ring that increases the hydrokinetic abilities of the original form. In this form, Haruto can use the Special Ring to manifest the Drago Tail (ドラゴテイル, Dorago Teiru), which allows him to perform either the Dragon Tail (ドラゴンテイル, Doragon Teiru) finisher on its own or the Dragon Smash (ドラゴンスマッシュ, Doragon Sumasshu) finisher in conjunction with the Blizzard (ブリザード, Burizādo) Ring.
- Hurricane Dragon (ハリケーンドラゴン, Harikēn Doragon): The evolved form of Hurricane Style accessed from the eponymous Wizard Ring that increases the aerokinetic abilities of the original form. In this form, Haruto can use the Special Ring to manifest a pair of Drago Wings (ドラゴウィング, Dorago Wingu), which allow him to perform either the Dragon Wing (ドラゴンウィング, Doragon Uingu) finisher on their own or the Dragon Sonic (ドラゴンソニック, Doragon Sonikku) finisher in conjunction with the Thunder (サンダー, Sandā) Ring.
- Land Dragon (ランドドラゴン, Rando Doragon): The evolved form of Land Style accessed from the eponymous Wizard Ring that increases the geokinetic abilities of the original form. In this form, Haruto can use the Special Ring to manifest a pair of Drago Hell Claws (ドラゴヘルクロー, Dorago Heru Kurō), which allow him to perform either the Dragon Claw (ドラゴンクローモ, Doragon Kurō) finisher on their own or the Dragon Ripper (ドラゴンリッパー, Doragon Rippā) finisher in conjunction with the Gravity (グラビティ, Gurabiti) Ring.
- Infinity Dragon (インフィニティードラゴン, Infinitī Doragon): An enhanced version of Infinity Style accessed from the Finish Strike (フィニッシュストライク, Finisshu Sutoraiku) Ring that allows Haruto to manifest the Infinity Tail (インフィニティテイル, Infiniti Teiru), a pair of Infinity Wings (インフィニティウィング, Infiniti Uingu), and a pair of Infinity Hell Claws (インフィニティヘルクロー, Infiniti Heru Kurō) at once. His finisher in this form is the Infinity End (インフィニティーエンド, Infinitī Endo) via the right foot-mounted Infinity Skull (インフィニティスカル, Infiniti Sukaru) that manifests when performed. This form appears exclusively in the film Kamen Rider Wizard in Magic Land.
  - Infinity Dragon Gold (インフィニティードラゴンゴールド, Infinitī Doragon Gōrudo): The evolved form of Infinity Dragon accessed from the Finish Strike Ring empowered by the Hope Ring in Haruto's Underworld (アンダーワールド, Andāwārudo) subconscious that allows him to manifest the chest-mounted Gold Infinity Skull (ゴールドインフィニティスカル, Gōrudo Infiniti Sukaru), the Gold Infinity Tail (ゴールドインフィニティテイル, Gōrudo Infiniti Teiru), a pair of Gold Infinity Wings (ゴールドインフィニティウィング, Gōrudo Infiniti Uingu), and a pair of Gold Infinity Hell Claws (ゴールドインフィニティヘルクロー, Gōrudo Infiniti Heru Kurō) at once. His finisher in this form is the Dragon Burst (ドラゴンバースト, Doragon Bāsuto) via the Gold Infinity Skull. This form first appears in the crossover film Kamen Rider × Kamen Rider Gaim & Wizard: The Fateful Sengoku Movie Battle.

Haruto Soma is portrayed by Shunya Shiraishi (白石 隼也, Shiraishi Shun'ya). As a child, Haruto is portrayed by Kaito Nakashima (中島 凱斗, Nakashima Kaito).

==== WizarDragon ====
WizarDragon (ウィザードラゴン, Wizādoragon), or simply Dragon (ドラゴン, Doragon), is Haruto's non-anthropomorphic inner Phantom who is usually summoned to battle inner Phantoms in a Gate's Underworld via the Dragorise (ドラゴライズ, Dragoraizu) Ring. Originally hostile towards Haruto, WizarDragon becomes impressed by the human's intent and later allows Haruto to fully utilize his power.

In battle, WizarDragon can fly and produce fire breath. He can also transform into the clawed Strike Phase (ストライクフェーズ, Sutoraiku Fēzu) foot via the Kick Strike Ring and assist Haruto in performing the Strike End (ストライクエンド, Sutoraiku Endo) finisher to destroy inner Phantoms. During the events of the crossover film Kamen Rider × Super Sentai × Space Sheriff: Super Hero Taisen Z, Haruto uses the Miracle (ミラクル, Mirakuru) Ring to summon an enlarged WizarDragon into the human world and combine with the Kyoryugers' giant robot Kyoryuzin to form Kyoryuzin Kick Strike (キョウリュウジンキックストライク, Kyōryūjin Kikku Sutoraiku), whose finisher is the Zyuden Brave Strike End (獣電ブレイブストライクエンド, Jūden Bureibu Sutoraiku Endo) via the Super Sentai (スーパー戦隊, Sūpā Sentai) Ring.

WizarDragon is voiced by Ryūzaburō Ōtomo (大友 龍三郎, Ōtomo Ryūzaburō) while his human form is portrayed by Shunya Shiraishi, who also portrays Haruto Soma.

=== Koyomi ===
Koyomi (コヨミ), also known as Koyomi Fueki (笛木 暦, Fueki Koyomi), is Haruto's assistant and Fueki's daughter whom he attempted to resurrect after she died several years prior during the Sabbath ritual. Despite placing the Philosopher's Stone in her body, he succeeded in half-resurrecting her and entrusts Haruto with protecting her and giving her periodic infusions of magical energy to maintain her state of being. Initially possessing no memory of what happened to her, she resents her half-dead state and wishes she was properly dead, though Haruto slowly convinces Koyomi to have hope in him, be more accepting of her circumstances, and work towards the future. While in Haruto's care, she lives in Shigeru Wajima's antiques shop and assists Haruto with her ability to detect disguised Phantoms. Koyomi eventually learns the truth of what happened to her before Sora Takigawa rips the Philosopher's Stone out of her body, killing her once more. After defeating Takigawa, Haruto takes the Philosopher's Stone and travels the world in the hopes of hiding it and preventing it being misused any further, eventually finding an ideal place in the form of his own Underworld's Koyomi. In the tie-in novel Novel: Kamen Rider Wizard, Haruto and Rinko have a daughter and name her Koyomi in memory of their deceased friend.

Koyomi is portrayed by Makoto Okunaka (奥仲 麻琴, Okunaka Makoto). As a child, Koyomi is portrayed by Kanon Kobayashi (小林 花音, Kobayashi Kanon).

=== Rinko Daimon ===
Rinko Daimon (大門 凛子, Daimon Rinko) is a rookie detective at the Metropolitan Police Department's Toriizaka Police Station (鳥居坂署, Toriizaka-sho) with an Edokko upbringing who joined the police force to help people like her father had. After being targeted by the Phantom, Minotauros, and nearly succumbing to her inner Phantom, Jabberwock, she gets caught up in the battle between Haruto and the Phantoms and provides support to the former through her police work. As of the tie-in novel Novel: Kamen Rider Wizard, Rinko married Haruto and has a daughter named Koyomi with him.

Rinko Daimon is portrayed by Yuko Takayama (高山 侑子, Takayama Yūko). As a child, Rinko is portrayed by Ichino Suehara (末原 一乃, Suehara Ichino).

=== Shunpei Nara ===
Shunpei Nara (奈良 瞬平, Nara Shunpei) is a clumsy young man who has been fascinated with magic ever since he read the picture book The Forest Wizard (森の魔法使い, Mori no Mahōtsukai), even going so far as to quote the wizard's magic phrase "Chichin Pui Pui" (ちちんぷいぷい) and attempt to become Haruto's apprentice. After being targeted by the Phantom, Hellhound, Shunpei falls into despair and nearly succumbs to his inner Phantom, Cyclops. While Haruto rescues Shunpei from both Phantoms, he also destroys Shunpei's potential for using magic. Despite this, Shunpei forces himself into Haruto's life, intent on supporting him nonetheless. As of the series finale, Shunpei becomes Shigeru Wajima's apprentice.

Shunpei Nara is portrayed by Junki Tozuka (戸塚 純貴, Tozuka Junki). As a child, Shunpei is portrayed by Ryusei Shoji (庄司 龍成, Shōji Ryūsei).

=== Kosuke Nito ===
Kosuke Nito (仁藤 攻介, Nitō Kōsuke) is a young, optimistic archaeologist from the Fukui Prefecture who believes that pinches and chances are two sides of the same coin, possesses a gigantic appetite, and a tendency to put mayonnaise on everything he eats. While on an expedition as a student archaeologist, he found the Beast Driver (ビーストドライバー, Bīsuto Doraibā) belt and broke a seal holding a horde of Ghouls at bay. Forced to become Kamen Rider Beast (仮面ライダービースト, Kamen Raidā Bīsuto) to defeat the monsters, he learns he unknowingly forged a pact with the Phantom, Beast Chimera, and must now consume other Phantoms for their magical energy to keep Beast Chimera satiated or else he will eat Kosuke. Despite this, Kosuke maintains the pact so he can learn more about Phantoms and his newfound powers under the belief that he will never make an important discovery like Beast Chimera again.

In the present, following a misunderstanding over how their respective magic functions during their first meeting, Kosuke views Haruto as his "eternal rival". Additionally, the former refuses to allow Haruto to destroy Beast Chimera, claiming his Phantom is too powerful. While fighting Sou Fueki, Kosuke breaks the Beast Driver to release Beast Chimera and let him devour the excess magical energy that Fueki's second Sabbath was generating in order to negate it. In appreciation, Beast Chimera spares Kosuke, frees him of their pact, and takes his leave. Following the Phantoms' defeat, Kosuke takes on Yuzuru Iijima as an apprentice and goes on a journey to find Beast Chimera again.

During the events of the crossover film Kamen Rider × Kamen Rider Gaim & Wizard: The Fateful Sengoku Movie Battle, Kosuke eventually succeeds in locating and recapturing Beast Chimera. However, he is forced to renew their pact to confront the Phantom, Ogre. Haruto defeats Ogre, but Kosuke is kidnapped by the Pitcher Plant Monster and taken to another universe. He is later rescued by Haruto and Kamen Rider Gaim before assisting them in defeating Kamen Rider Bujin Gaim. Following this, Kosuke discovers he can feed Beast Chimera Helheim fruits to satiate its appetite as well.

Utilizing the Beast (ビースト, Bīsuto) Ring in conjunction with the Beast Driver, Kosuke can transform into the "Ancient Wizard" (古の魔法使い, Inishie no Mahōtsukai), Kamen Rider Beast, whose signature finisher is the Strike Beast (ストライクビースト, Sutoraiku Bīsuto). While transformed, he wields the Dice Saber (ダイスサーベル, Daisu Sāberu), which allows him to perform the Saber Strike (セイバーストライク, Seibā Sutoraiku) finisher. Similarly to Haruto, Kosuke possesses his own series of Magic Rings that allow him to access different right shoulder-mounted Mantle (マント, Manto) capes, which grant a variety of animal-inspired abilities.

- Falco Mantle (ファルコマント, Faruko Manto): An orange-colored cape accessed from the Falco (ファルコ, Faruko) Ring that grants flight capabilities. This cape first appears in the crossover film Kamen Rider × Kamen Rider Wizard & Fourze: Movie War Ultimatum.
- Chameleo Mantle (カメレオマント, Kamereo Manto): A green-colored cape accessed from the Chameleo (カメレオ, Kamereo) Ring that grants the ability to blend in with the surrounding environment, appear invisible to enemies, and utilize an extendable tongue on the pauldron.
- Buffa Mantle (バッファマント, Baffa Manto): A red-colored cape accessed from the Buffa (バッファ, Baffa) Ring that grants superhuman strength.
- Dolphi Mantle (ドルフィマント, Dorufi Manto): A purple-colored cape accessed from the Dolphi (ドルフィ, Dorufi) Ring that grants swimming capabilities and the use of healing spells.

Additionally, Kosuke can use unique Wizard Rings to achieve power-up forms, which are as follows:

- Kamen Rider Beast Hyper ((仮面ライダービーストハイパー, Kamen Raidā Bīsuto Haipā): Kosuke's final form accessed from the Hyper (ハイパー, Haipā) Ring that grants the use of forearm-mounted extendable tassels. While transformed, he wields the Mirage Magnum (ミラージュマグナム, Mirāju Magunamu) handgun, which allows him to perform the Shooting Mirage (シューティングミラージュ, Shūtingu Mirāju) finisher.
- Wizard Style (ウィザードスタイル, Wizādo Sutairu): An enhanced version of Kosuke's default form accessed from the Land Dragon Ring that equips him with the Drago Hell Claws. His finisher in this form is the Dragon Beast Torn (ドラゴンビーストトーン, Doragon Bīsuto Tōn). This form appears exclusively in the Hyper Battle DVD special Kamen Rider Wizard: Showtime with the Dance Ring!!.

Kosuke Nito is portrayed by Tasuku Nagase (永瀬 匡, Nagase Tasuku). As a child, Kosuke is portrayed by Kirato Wakayama (若山 耀人, Wakayama Kirato).

==== Beast Chimera ====
Beast Chimera (ビーストキマイラ, Bīsuto Kimaira), or simply Chimera (キマイラ, Kimaira), is a chimeric, five-headed non-anthropomorphic lion/falcon/chameleon/buffalo/dolphin-themed Phantom that was sealed within the Beast Driver for millennia. When Kosuke found the Beast Driver, Chimera formed a pact with the human to spare his life in return for being provided an abundance of magical energy, such as that of other Phantoms', to feed on. Like WizarDragon, Kosuke can summon Beast Chimera within a Gate's Underworld to help him fight inner Phantoms via the Chimarise (キマイライズ, Kimairaizu) Ring.

In battle, Beast Chimera possesses leonine claws, can fire Beast Lasers (ビーストレーザー, Bīsuto Rēzā) from all five of his heads, and perform the Biting End (バイティングエンド, Baitingu Endo) finisher. In the film Kamen Rider Wizard in Magic Land, the Magic Land version of Beast Chimera possesses the ability to transform into a claw version of the Strike Phase to assist Kosuke in performing the Strike End to destroy inner Phantoms.

Beast Chimera is voiced by Tomomichi Nishimura (西村 知道, Nishimura Tomomichi).

== Recurring characters ==
=== Sou Fueki ===
Sou Fueki (笛木 奏, Fueki Sō) is a former particle physicist at Kirimine University (霧峰大学, Kirimine Daigaku) and Koyomi's father who initiated the first Sabbath in a failed attempt to resurrect her via the Philosopher's Stone, the mana of four Phantoms as a power source, and several Gates as sacrifices. As Koyomi was not fully resurrected and more Phantoms were created in the process, he used a combination of science and magic to create the artificial Phantom, Carbuncle (カーバンクル, Kābankuru), and absorbed it in order to become Kamen Rider Wiseman (仮面ライダーワイズマン, Kamen Raidā Waizuman), also known as the White Wizard (白い魔法使い, Shiroi Mahōtsukai), and utilize Carbuncle's ability to produce magic stones for Shigeru Wajima to create Magic Rings out of in order to enhance his magical capabilities. After tasking Haruto with taking care of Koyomi for him, Fueki assumed the identity of the Phantoms' leader, Wiseman (ワイズマン, Waizuman), to manipulate them into creating more Phantoms to strengthen Haruto's powers while using his White Wizard alias to find three more magicians in the hopes that their and Haruto's mana will prove more powerful before initiating a new Sabbath. In preparation for the ritual, Fueki provides Haruto with additional Magic Rings to enhance his power further, grants Mayu Inamori the means to transform into Kamen Rider Mage, and brainwashes Yuzuru Iijima and Masahiro Yamamoto into serving him as additional Kamen Rider Mages.

After he kills the Phantom, Medusa, for threatening his plans, Fueki's multiple aliases are exposed and he reveals his true intentions to everyone involved before forcing Haruto, Mayu, Yuzuru, and Masahiro to become his second Sabbath's power source and using all of Tokyo as a sacrificial site. However, Kosuke and Beast Chimera foil the ritual while Sora Takigawa tricks Fueki into weakening himself before killing him.

Utilizing the Change (チェンジ, Chenji) Ring in conjunction with the White Wizard Driver (白い魔法使いドライバー, Shiroi Mahōtsukai Doraibā) belt, Fueki can transform into Kamen Rider Wiseman. While transformed, he possesses his own set of Magic Rings, which allow him to perform advanced versions of Haruto's spells, and wields the flute-like Hamel Cane (ハーメルケイン, Hāmeru Kein) spear. With his own version of the Kick Strike Ring, he can perform his own version of the Strike Wizard.

Sou Fueki is portrayed by Narushi Ikeda (池田 成志, Ikeda Narushi), the White Wizard is voiced by Toshitsugu Takashina (高階 俊嗣, Takashina Toshitsugu), and Wiseman is voiced by Toshio Furukawa (古川 登志夫, Furukawa Toshio).

=== Phantoms ===
The Phantoms (ファントム, Fantomu) are mythical creature-themed monsters born from Gates, humans with magical potential who experience true hopelessness. As they possess individual personalities, some seek to turn more Gates into Phantoms on the orders of their leader Wiseman while others pursue their own desires. Additionally, some Phantoms embody the dark aspects of their Gate's personality and as such, either behave in an opposite manner or retain their original personality. Along with unique individual abilities, Phantoms can also assume the form of the human they were spawned from.

==== Medusa ====
Medusa (メデューサ, Medyūsa) is a cruel and calculating Phantom born from high school student Misa Inamori (稲森 美紗, Inamori Misa), who was among the people that Fueki abducted for his first Sabbath. She displays undying loyalty to Wiseman and takes great offense to any Phantom who refuses to carry out their mission, even going so far as to execute them. She also rarely takes part in combat unless she deems it necessary or is forced to. While attempting to infiltrate a high school and target a student named Takako, Medusa learns of her original self's twin sister Mayu Inamori and attempts to create a Phantom from her instead, only to contribute to Mayu becoming a witch and develop a rivalry with her. However, this and Medusa discovering Wiseman's true intentions leads to him killing her.

In her human form, Medusa can see into Gates' personal Underworlds and fire eye beams. In her Phantom form, she wields the Arrogant (アロガント, Aroganto) scepter, can utilize magic, use her hair to siphon magic, and petrify opponents.

Medusa and Misa Inamori are portrayed by Erina Nakayama (中山 絵梨奈, Nakayama Erina), who also portrays Mayu Inamori.

==== Phoenix ====
Phoenix (フェニックス, Fenikkusu) is a Phantom born from florist assistant Yugo Fujita (藤田 雄吾, Fujita Yūgo), who was among the people that Fueki abducted for his first Sabbath. Unlike his original self, Phoenix is an arrogant berserker with a fiery temper and love of violence. This led to him killing a Gate by mistake and being forced to become an observer for his fellow Phantoms, though he behaves in an overbearing manner towards them. Due to Haruto's interference, Phoenix convinces Wiseman to let him stop the wizard, only to be defeated and vow revenge. Phoenix goes on to battle Haruto several times until Wiseman forbids him from doing so due to his constant losses against Haruto. In response, Phoenix attacks drunkards in his human form, attracts Rinko's attention, and befriends her since she only knew of him in his Phantom form. After she suggests he act on his own whim, he enlists Sora Takigawa to help him settle his rivalry with Haruto. During their final battle, the wizard sends Phoenix hurtling into the sun, which traps the Phantom in an endless loop of dying and resurrection that consumes his mana before he can fully regenerate.

In battle, Phoenix wields the Catastrophe (カタストロフ, Katasutorofu) broadsword, can control hellfire, and revive from any attack that would be fatal to other Phantoms with more power than he previously possessed.

Phoenix and Yugo Fujita are portrayed by Atsumi Kanno (菅野 篤海, Kan'no Atsumi).

==== Sora Takigawa ====
Sora Takigawa (滝川 空, Takigawa Sora), initially credited as a "youth" (青年, seinen), is a hairdresser turned serial killer who murdered and scalped an unknown number of his former clients due to their resemblance to a former girlfriend, whom he killed in a fit of rage after she broke up with him, and was among the Gates that Fueki kidnapped for his Sabbath and turned into Phantoms. While Takigawa was turned into the Phantom Gremlin (グレムリン, Guremurin), he retained his original personality, acts on his own whims, and refers to most Phantoms by their Gates' names. Motivated by a desire to fight Haruto at his full power and to know Wiseman's full plan, Takigawa secretly provides Haruto with additional magic stones through his allies and assists Phoenix in his final battle with Haruto before taking Phoenix's place as an observer for other Phantoms to get closer to Wiseman. After gaining Wiseman's trust, Takigawa becomes his right hand.

Takigawa eventually reveals his unique nature to Haruto in an attempt to convince him of their similarities but is disappointed when Haruto discovers his history as a human. Following this, Takigawa attempts to make himself human again by planting the idea of investigating Fueki into Haruto's mind and making several attempts to kidnap Koyomi to retrieve the Philosopher's Stone from her body. When Kosuke foils Fueki's second Sabbath, Takigawa tricks the latter into weakening himself before killing him to extract the Philosopher's Stone from Koyomi and absorb it. However, he inadvertently evolves his Phantom form and resolves to amass more magical energy through senseless death and destruction, leading Haruto to confirm that Takigawa had since abandoned his humanity prior to the Sabbath. The latter is ultimately defeated by Kamen Rider Wizard, who removes the Philosopher's Stone from Takigawa before killing him.

In his Phantom form, Takigawa dual wields the twin scissor-like Rapture (ラプチャー, Rapuchā) swords and possesses superhuman speed.

Sora Takigawa is portrayed by Takahisa Maeyama (前山 剛久, Maeyama Takahisa).

==== Ghouls ====
The Ghouls (グール, Gūru) are stone imp-like lesser Phantoms capable of either converting their arms into gun-like weapons that shoot hellfire or wielding polearms that the stronger Phantoms can summon to serve as foot soldiers. While they are weaker than regular Phantoms, Ghouls can withstand gunfire.

The Ghouls are voiced by Yuuki Anai (穴井 勇輝, Anai Yūki) and Kazuki Komine (小峰 一己, Komine Kazuki).

==== Minor Phantoms ====
- Minotauros (ミノタウロス, Minotaurosu): A Phantom born from Toriizaka Police Station Detective Amino (網野) who wields the Bull Axe (ブルアックス, Buru Akkusu) and can produce small fireballs from his hands. He targets Rinko Daimon, only to be destroyed by Kamen Rider Wizard. Minotauros is portrayed by RIKIYA (リキヤ).
- Jabberwock (ジャバウォック, Jabawokku): A giant, non-anthropomorphic inner Phantom with a pair of pterosaur wings, six spear-like legs, and the ability to fire balls of electricity from its mouth. It resides in Rinko Daimon's Underworld until Kamen Rider Wizard destroys it.
- Hellhound (ヘルハウンド, Heruhaundo): A Phantom born from morning news announcer Kazuo Tajima (田島 一夫, Tajima Kazuo) with pyrokinesis, shadow magic, and the Black Dog (ブラックドッグ, Burakku Doggu) motorcycle. He targets Shunpei Nara, only to be destroyed by Kamen Rider Wizard. Hellhound and Kazuo Tajima are portrayed by Takeshi Kongochi (金剛地 武志, Kongōchi Takeshi).
- Cyclops (サイクロプス, Saikuropusu): A giant inner Phantom that possesses incredible strength, a pair of claws, and a spiked club. It resides in Shunpei's Underworld until Kamen Rider Wizard destroys it.
- Catsith (ケット・シー, Ketto Shī): A cowardly Phantom born from an unnamed African man with adept combat capabilities, a pair of claws, and the ability to turn his arms into golden blades. Medusa forces him to target pianist Eisaku Takagi (高木 栄作, Takagi Eisaku). However, he is foiled and destroyed by Kamen Rider Wizard. Catsith and his unnamed Gate are portrayed by Bernard Ackah (ベルナール・アッカ, Berunāru Akka).
- Gnome (ノーム, Nōmu): A Phantom born from an unnamed sommelier who wields a trident and possesses burrowing capabilities. He is assigned to target scam artist Manami Yamasaki (川崎 愛美, Yamasaki Manami), only to be foiled and destroyed by Kamen Rider Wizard. Gnome is portrayed by Yoshiyuki Kanayasu (かなやす 慶行, Kanayasu Yoshiyuki)
- Gargoyle (ガーゴイル, Gāgoiru): A Phantom born from an unnamed worker with the ability to petrify himself, which he can use defensively and offensively. He targets Naoki Katayama, only to be destroyed by Kamen Rider Wizard. In the DVD special Showtime with the Dance Ring, a new version of Gargoyle appears in Yu Kamimura's Underworld, only to be destroyed by Kamen Riders Wizard and Beast. Gargoyle is voiced by Takehito Yamaji (山地 健仁, Yamaji Takehito) in the series and Yūsuke Numata (沼田 祐介, Numata Yūsuke) in Showtime with the Dance Ring.
- Jormungandr (ヨルムンガルド, Yorumungarudo): A giant, non-anthropomorphic inner Phantom that possesses the ability to fire purple fireballs from its singular eye and multiple tentacles. It resides in Naoki Katayama's Underworld until Kamen Rider Wizard destroys it.
- Valkyrie (ヴァルキリー, Varukirī): A male Phantom born from Katsuya Kiritani (桐谷 克弥, Kiritani Katsuya) who wields a spear, can fly, and fire energy darts from his forehead. He targets struggling wagashi shop owner Shozo Matsuki (松木 昭造, Matsuki Shōzō), only to be foiled and destroyed by Kamen Rider Wizard. Valkyrie and Katsuya Kiritani are portrayed by Isao Sugibayashi (杉林 功, Sugibayashi Isao).
- Lizardman (リザードマン, Rizādoman): A Phantom born from film director Satoshi Ishii (石井 悟史, Ishii Satoshi), who was among the people that Fueki kidnapped for his first Sabbath, that possesses a thick hide and wields the Scale (スケール, Sukēru) sword. Following a failed attempt on Haruto's life during the Sabbath, Lizardman goes on the run from Phoenix and Medusa, not wanting anything to do with their mission. While in his human form, he comes into Haruto's care and meets Chizuru Manaka (真中 千鶴, Manaka Chizuru), an actress who worked with his Gate. However, Medusa finds Lizardman and forces him to kill Haruto and target Manaka. Ultimately, Kamen Rider Wizard foils and destroys Lizardman. Lizardman and Satoshi Ishii are portrayed by Keisuke Ueda (植田 圭輔, Ueda Keisuke).
- Hekatonkheir (ヘカトンケイル, Hekatonkeiru): A giant inner Phantom that possesses incredible strength, six arms, two spears, a sword, and an axe. Phoenix attempts to free it from the Underworld of a man named Tatsuro (達郎), only for Kamen Rider Wizard to destroy it.
- Manticore (マンティコア, Mantikoa): A Phantom born from an unnamed fortune teller who is adept in combat and possesses a poisonous tail stinger. Wiseman sends him to target Kosuke, only to be destroyed by Nito as Kamen Rider Beast. Manticore is portrayed Shoichiro Akaboshi (赤星 昇一郎, Akaboshi Shōichirō).
- Hydra (ヒドラ, Hidora): A Phantom born from an unnamed diver who wields a spear and possesses underwater diving capabilities and several extendable tentacles. He targets artist Hiroshi Oikawa (及川 博, Oikawa Hiroshi), only to be defeated by Kamen Rider Wizard. Hydra is portrayed by Motokuni Nakagawa (中川 素州, Nakagawa Motokuni).
- Bandersnatch (バンダースナッチ, Bandāsunatchi): A giant, non-anthropomorphic inner Phantom with strong physical capabilities and agility, flight capabilities, and the ability to split off segments of its body into smaller versions of itself. It resides in Hiroshi Oikawa's Underworld until Kamen Rider Beast destroys it.
- Beelzebub (ベルゼバブ, Beruzebabu): A sadistic Phantom born from an unnamed conductor who can manipulate space-time, teleport, control human minds, and wields a sword capable of firing light needles. He targets housewife Shiho Arai (新井 志保, Arai Shiho), only to be foiled and destroyed by Kamen Rider Wizard. Beelzebub is portrayed by IZAM.
- Weretiger (ワータイガー, Wātaigā): A Phantom born from self-proclaimed "muscular man" Igawa (井川) who possesses superhuman strength, a sword, and the ability to fire energy balls from his pectorals. He targets Kosuke's no-nonsense grandmother Toshie Nito (仁藤 敏江, Nitō Toshie), only to be foiled by Kamen Rider Wizard and destroyed by Kamen Rider Beast. Weretiger and Igawa are portrayed by Kingoro Torajima (虎島 キンゴロウ, Torajima Kingorō).
- Spriggan (スプリガン, Supurigan): A Phantom born from an unnamed security officer who wields the Curiosity (キュリオシティ, Kyurioshiti) sword, Riddle (リドル, Ridoru) shield, and upper back-mounted cannons. He targets archaeologist Osamu Nakamoto (中本 治, Nakamoto Osamu), only to be foiled and destroyed by Kamen Rider Beast. Spriggan is portrayed by Kenji Cotton (こっとん 健児, Kotton Kenji).
- Legion (レギオン, Region): A Phantom born from a man called Naitō (内藤) who wields a double-bladed polearm capable of opening anyone's Underworlds. Due to Legion's insatiable desire to attack and destroy any human he deems has a "beautiful heart", Wiseman locked him away in a cave. However, Sora Takigawa frees Legion, who goes on a rampage until he is destroyed by Kamen Rider Wizard. Legion is portrayed by Mitsu Murata (村田 充, Murata Mitsu).
- Bogy (ボギー, Bogī): A Phantom born a man called Kasahara (笠原) who possesses intangibility, the ability to summon spirits capable of giving people bad luck and reviving him, and wields a lance. He targets six Gates, only to be foiled and destroyed by Kamen Rider Beast. Bogy is portrayed by Kenji Yabe (やべ けんじ, Yabe Kenji).
- Argus (アルゴス, Arugosu): A Phantom born from a man called Akito Kosuda (小須田 明人, Kosuda Akito) capable of producing a blinding flash that can temporarily blind people and the use of puppet eyes that can attack from multiple directions via light bolts. He targets popular model, Chiaki Shimizu (清水 千明, Shimizu Chiaki), only to be foiled by Takigawa and destroyed by Kamen Rider Beast. Argus and Akita Kosuda are portrayed by Jin Shirosaki (城咲 仁, Shirosaki Jin).
- Raum (ラウム, Raumu): A Phantom born from a man called Kaga (加賀) with superhuman speed, a spear, and the ability to turn into a talking myna bird. He targets Nemoto Kazuyoshi (根本 和義, Kazuyoshi Nemoto) by framing him for arson, only to be destroyed by Kamen Rider Wizard. Raum is portrayed by Minoru Watanabe (渡辺実, Watanabe Minoru) while Yuki Anai voices his bird form.
- Bahamut (バハムート, Bahamūto): A Phantom born from a man called Katsumura (勝村) with strong physical capabilities, sharp arm and leg blades, and the ability to produce an energy blade from his arms. He targets amateur soccer player and Haruto's former teammate, Kazuya Shinozaki (篠崎 和也, Shinozaki Kazuya), only to be foiled and destroyed by Kamen Rider Wizard. Bahamut and Katsumura are portrayed by Shuuya Yoshimoto (佳本 周也, Yoshimoto Shūya).
- Sylphi (シルフィ, Shirufi): A male Phantom born from a man called Nishikawa (西川) with aerokinesis, flight capabilities, and a halberd. He targets Yuzuru Iijima, only to be foiled by the latter and defeated by Kamen Riders Wizard and Beast. Sylphi and Nishikawa are portrayed by Makoto Awane (粟根 まこと, Awane Makoto).
- Sphinx (スフィンクス, Sufinkusu): A riddle-obsessed Phantom born from a man called Kusuda (楠田) who possesses pyrokinesis and wields a baton. He targets Masafumi Saionji (西園寺 雅文, Saionji Masafumi) while the latter is attempting to find Koyomi after she gave him a ring years prior, only to be destroyed by Kamen Rider Beast. Sphinx is portrayed by Kaohiko Kaoda (顔田 顔彦, Kaoda Kaohiko).
- Gigantes (ギガンテス, Gigantesu): A giant, non-anthropomorphic inner Phantom capable of levitating and creating energy chains. It resides in Masafumi Saionji's Underworld until Kamen Rider Wizard destroys it.
- Siren (セイレーン, Seiren): A Phantom born from a woman called Shizune (静音) who possesses aerokinesis and a spear. She targets Haruto's elementary school teacher Yoshikazu Kumagai (熊谷 義和, Kumagai Yoshikazu), only to be foiled by Kamen Riders Wizard and Beast and destroyed by the former. Siren and Shizune are portrayed by Ayano Oota (太田 彩乃, Ōta Ayano).
- Arachne (アラクネ, Arakune): A male Phantom born from an unnamed, unseen Gate who possesses a durable exoskeleton, a pair of claws, an axe, superhuman speed, and the ability to merge with the ground. He is destroyed by Kamen Riders Wizard and Beast. Arachne is voiced by Daisuke Kirii (桐井 大介, Kirii Daisuke).

===== Other Phantoms =====
- Carbuncle: Artificial Phantoms created by Fueki, with one of them being absorbed into the former so he can transform into Kamen Rider Wiseman. In the crossover film Kamen Rider × Kamen Rider Gaim & Wizard: The Fateful Sengoku Movie Battle, three dormant Carbuncles are awakened during the National Security Bureau Section Zero's investigation of one of Fueki's old hideouts before Ogre absorbs the Phantoms to gain their powers. Ogre later summons the Carbuncles to distract Kosuke during his quest to devour WizarDragon.
- Khepri (ケプリ, Kepuri): A Phantom born from an unnamed, unseen Magic Land Gate who appears exclusively in the film Kamen Rider Wizard in Magic Land. He leads a group of Ghouls in attacking Magic Land inhabitants, only to be destroyed by the Magic Land versions of Shunpei Nara, Yu Kamimura, and Rinko Daimon. Khepri is voiced by Keiji Hirai (平井 啓二, Hirai Keiji).
- Drake (ドレイク, Doreiku): A Phantom born from Minister Auma (オーマ大臣, Ōma-daijin), a wizard and the former emperor of Magic Land, who appears exclusively in the film Kamen Rider Wizard in Magic Land. Utilizing Auma's form, the Sorcerer's Belt (ソーサラーのベルト, Sōsarā no Beruto), and the Sorcerer (ソーサラー, Sōsarā) Ring, Drake can transform into the "Golden Wizard" (金色の魔法使い, Kin'iro no Mahōtsukai), Kamen Rider Sorcerer (仮面ライダーソーサラー, Kamen Raidā Sōsarā). While transformed, he wields the Dis Halberd (ディースハルバード, Dīsu Harubādo) and possesses his own set of Magic Rings, such as the Final Strike (ファイナルストライク, Fainaru Sutoraiku) Ring, which allows him to perform the Strike Sorcerer (ストライクソーサラー, Sutoraiku Sōsarā) finisher. Drake creates Magic Land and manipulates its ruler, Maya, as part of a plot to create Phantoms from magicians, only to be killed by Kamen Rider Wizard. Drake and Auma are portrayed by Takanori Jinnai (陣内 孝則, Jinnai Takanori).
- Ouroboros (ウロボロス, Uroborosu): A non-anthropomorphic inner Phantom that resides in Shiina's Underworld until Kamen Riders Wizard and Beast destroy it. This Phantom appears exclusively in the film Kamen Rider Wizard in Magic Land.
- Ogre (オーガ, Ōga): A cannibalistic Phantom born from a man called Osuga (大須賀, Ōsuga) who thrives on consuming other Phantoms for their abilities and appears exclusively in the crossover film Kamen Rider × Kamen Rider Gaim & Wizard: The Fateful Sengoku Movie Battle. In an attempt to devour WizarDragon, Ogre steals the Philosopher's Stone from Haruto and uses it to create a copy of Koyomi. The Phantom succeeds in entering Haruto's Underworld, but is defeated by Haruto and WizarDragon. Ogre and Osuga are portrayed by Atsushi (敦士).

=== Shigeru Wajima ===
Shigeru Wajima (輪島 繁, Wajima Shigeru) is the owner of the Antique Shop Omokagedō (骨董店・面影堂, Kottōten Omokagedō; lit. "Vestige Hall"), which serves as Haruto and his allies' unofficial headquarters, and a skilled ring maker who creates Haruto and Fueki's Magic Rings. Wajima initially did not make rings out of fear of hurting people until he met Haruto, who renewed the ring maker's resolve and became inspired to help Haruto.

Shigeru Wajima is portrayed by Hisahiro Ogura (小倉 久寛, Ogura Hisahiro).

=== Masanori Kizaki ===
Masanori Kizaki (木崎 政範, Kizaki Masanori) is the superintendent of the Tokyo Metropolitan Police Department's National Security Bureau Section Zero (国家安全局0課, Kokka Anzenkyoku Zero-ka) branch who secretly investigates Kamen Rider Wizard and the Phantoms, seeing both as abominations. Six months prior, he and his partner Katayama discovered the Phantoms' existence while investigating mass disappearances and lost Katayama to the Phantom, Gargoyle. Ever since, Kizaki looked after Katayama's son, Naoki. After working with Wizard to save Naoki, Kizaki becomes an ally to him and goes on to discover and tell him the White Wizard's true identity.

Masanori Kizaki is portrayed by Naoki Kawano (川野 直輝, Kawano Naoki).

=== Yu Kamimura ===
Yu Kamimura (上村 優, Kamimura Yū) is the effeminate, homosexual manager of the Donut Shop Hungry (ど～なつ屋 はんぐり～, Dōnatsu-ya Hangurī) food truck who dresses in drag. He sees Haruto as his favorite customer and comes up with countless new flavors and styles of doughnuts for him, only to be stymied when Haruto asks for his usual order of plain sugar doughnuts.

During the events of the crossover film Kamen Rider × Kamen Rider Wizard & Fourze: Movie War Ultimatum, Kamimura is kidnapped by the Akumaizer due to his status as a Gate and trapped in a machine that utilizes his mana, along with the mana of four children, to create an army of monsters. While in his Underworld, Kamimura became his ideal self, a young woman with the power to transform into the Young Masked Belle Poitrine (美少女仮面ポワトリン, Bishōjo Kamen Powatorin), (Note: Young Masked Belle Poitrine is an homage to Shotaro Ishinomori's La Belle Fille Masquée Poitrine, with Yu Kamimura's name being inspired by the titular character's secret identity, Yuko Murakami.) but becomes trapped in a time loop wherein everyone around him only celebrates his birthday and convinced by the Akumaizer that this is better than his regular life to keep him placated and better facilitate their plans. After ending up in Kamimura's Underworld, Haruto helps him move past his fantasies, rescue the trapped children, and work together to defeat the Akumaizer.

Utilizing the Orgel Pendant (オルゴールペンダント, Orugōru Pendanto), Kamimura can transform into Poitrine. While transformed, he can perform magic and wields the Belle Sabre (ベルサーベル, Beru Sāberu).

Yu Kamimura is portrayed by Kaba-chan (KABA.ちゃん) while his ideal self is portrayed by Mari Iriki (入来 茉里, Iriki Mari). Of the role, Kaba-chan stated that while she never really watched Kamen Rider as a child, she felt that she would form great memories as a member of the Kamen Rider Wizard cast. This role made her the first LGBT cast member and regular character in the history of the Kamen Rider franchise.

=== Kamen Rider Mage ===
Kamen Rider Mage (仮面ライダーメイジ, Kamen Raidā Meiji) is the collective name for a mass-produced Rider form utilized by most magicians. First appearing in the film Kamen Rider Wizard in Magic Land, all magically-powered inhabitants of Magic Land possess the ability to transform into a variation of Kamen Rider Mage depending on their societal role. In the series, Fueki uses three versions of Kamen Rider Mage to serve as a power source for his second Sabbath ritual.

All versions of Kamen Rider Mage utilize a Mage (メイジ, Meiji) Ring in conjunction with the Mage's Belt (メイジのベルト, Meiji no Beruto) to transform where they are equipped with the left forearm-mounted Scratch Nail (スクラッチネイル, Sukuratchi Neiru) claw. Additionally, the film versions wield the broom-like Ride Scraper (ライドスクレイパー, Raido Sukureipā) spear, which can be utilized for offensive and transportation purposes.

==== Mayu Inamori ====
Mayu Inamori (稲森 真由, Inamori Mayu) is the younger twin sister of Misa Inamori, Medusa's original self. After losing her sister and parents while studying abroad, Mayu returns to Japan, eventually encounters Medusa, and learns the Phantom killed her parents. Despite falling into despair, Mayu recalls a memory of Misa telling her only she can decide her fate and suppresses her inner Phantom. As a result, Mayu becomes a witch and accepts the White Wizard's offer to hone her skills so she can hunt Phantoms and avenge her family.

Sometime later, Mayu returns to fight Medusa as an amber-colored version of Kamen Rider Mage. After several battles with Medusa however, Mayu discovers the White Wizard's true identity and intentions and sides with Haruto to stop him. Following the Phantoms' defeat, Mayu joins the Toriizaka Police Station under Rinko Daimon.

Unlike other versions of Kamen Rider Mage, Mayu also wields her own version of the WizarSwordGun and the Holy (ホーリー, Hōrī) Ring, which allows her to destroy most Phantoms.

Mayu Inamori is portrayed by Erina Nakayama, who also portrays Medusa and Misa Inamori.

==== Yuzuru Iijima ====
Yuzuru Iijima (飯島 譲, Iijima Yuzuru) is a boy who wanted to make amends with his friend Akari Kurata (倉田 朱里, Kurata Akari) for getting her in trouble after stealing her bike in an attempt to learn how to ride one. While being targeted by the Phantom Sylphi, Yuzuru gets Kosuke to teach him how to ride a bike. While Yuzuru falls into despair after Sylphi manipulates him into injuring Kurata, her voice inspires the boy to suppress his inner Phantom. Yuzuru decides not to become a wizard, but Fueki kidnaps and brainwashes him into becoming a blue-colored version of Kamen Rider Mage in order to kidnap Mayu Inamori and become a power source for his second Sabbath ritual. When Kosuke succeeds in foiling Fueki's plans, Yuzuru is freed from the latter's control and later becomes Kosuke's apprentice.

Yuzuru Iijima is portrayed by Shinta Sōma (相馬 眞太, Sōma Shinta). As a child, Yuzuru is portrayed by Reigo Mizoguchi (溝口 怜冴, Mizoguchi Reigo).

==== Masahiro Yamamoto ====
Masahiro Yamamoto (山本 昌宏, Yamamoto Masahiro) is a father-to-be who was attacked by the Phantom, Arachne, while purchasing baby items for his pregnant wife, Aya Yamamoto. After discovering he is a Gate, Haruto and his allies bring Masahiro to the antiques shop Omokagedō for protection, but Masahiro becomes distraught when he learns he cannot contact his wife. Kosuke leads the search for Aya, but Arachne finds her first. While Kosuke fights the Phantom, Medusa takes advantage by attacking and seemingly killing Aya to make Masahiro fall into despair. Upon learning Haruto protected Aya at the last minute, Masahiro overcomes his despair and suppresses his inner Phantom, only to be kidnapped, brainwashed, and turned into a green-colored version of Kamen Rider Mage by Fueki for his Sabbath ritual. While under Fueki's control, Masahiro fights Haruto and his allies before serving as a power source for the Sabbath until Kosuke foils Fueki's plans, freeing Masahiro in the process. Masahiro initially attempts to return to his family, but Aya convinces him to help Haruto, Kosuke, and their allies stop Sora Takigawa. Following Takigawa's defeat, Masahiro's son is born.

Masahiro is portrayed by Shingo Kawaguchi (川口 真五, Kawaguchi Shingo).

== Guest characters ==
- Aya Yamamoto (山本 亜矢, Yamamoto Aya): A mother-to-be and Masahiro's wife. Aya Yamamoto is portrayed by Miyuu Sawai (沢井 美優, Sawai Miyū).
- Amadum (アマダム, Amadamu): An evil wizard who can perform magic without a Driver and call out spells to invoke their effect without a ring. He was imprisoned in and became the ruler of the "World Within the Magic Stone" (魔法石の中の世界, Mahōseki no Naka no Sekai), an alternate world inside the Philosopher's Stone created from the souls of monsters defeated by the Heisei Kamen Riders where human inhabitants transform into monsters following puberty. Amadum seeks to break out by stealing the Heisei Riders' powers and using the Magic Stone world's version of Haruto Soma so he can exact revenge on the world. However, he is defeated by Kamen Riders Wizard and Gaim with help from their Heisei Rider predecessors. Amadum is portrayed by Tomorowo Taguchi (田口 トモロヲ, Taguchi Tomorowo).
- The Boy: A young, orphan version of Haruto who resides within the World Within the Magic Stone, but desires to break out and save his version of Koyomi. He initially distrusts the "primary" version of Haruto, but later helps him defeat Amadum. Following this, the Boy learns he might become a Kamen Rider instead of a monster and is entrusted with Haruto's Infinity Ring. The Boy is portrayed by Ryūto (竜跳).
- Koyomi: The "World Within the Magic Stone's" version of Koyomi who is on the verge of becoming a monster. The "World Within the Magic Stone" version of Koyomi is portrayed by SALA.
- Tsukasa Kadoya (門矢 士, Kadoya Tsukasa): A nomadic photographer from an alternate universe and one of Haruto's Heisei Rider predecessors who can transform into Kamen Rider Decade (仮面ライダーディケイド, Kamen Raidā Dikeido). Tsukasa and the other Riders who preceded Haruto are trapped in the World Within the Magic Stone until Haruto joins forces with them and Kamen Rider Gaim to defeat Amadum and escape. Tsukasa Kadoya is portrayed by Masahiro Inoue (井上 正大, Inoue Masahiro), who reprises his role from Kamen Rider Decade.
- Kota Kazuraba (葛葉 紘汰, Kazuraba Kōta): An Armored Rider from Zawame City who can transform into Kamen Rider Gaim (仮面ライダー鎧武, Kamen Raidā Gaimu). When he hears the Boy's cries for help, he enters the World Within the Magic Stone where he joins forces with Haruto and their Heisei Rider predecessors to defeat Amadum. Kota Kazuraba is portrayed by Gaku Sano (佐野 岳, Sano Gaku), ahead of his appearance in Kamen Rider Gaim.

== Spin-off characters ==
- Akumaizer (アクマイザー, Akumaizā): (Note: The Akumaizer are an homage to the protagonists of Akumaizer 3, a tokusatsu series that original Kamen Rider TV series creator Shotaro Ishinomori worked on.) Remnants of the Akuma Clan (アクマ族, Akuma Zoku), who hail from the Demon World (魔界, Makai), wield Jankel (ジャンケル, Jankeru) rapiers, can perform the Devil Team Attack (悪魔陣アタック, Akuma-jin Atakku), and appear exclusively in the crossover film Kamen Rider × Kamen Rider Wizard & Fourze: Movie War Ultimatum. Millennia prior, they were forced underground by humanity, who saw them as "devils" (悪魔, akuma). In the present, the Akumaizer seek revenge by using five Gates that the Phantoms provided to create the Infinite Monster Plant (無限モンスタープラント, Mugen Monsutā Puranto) and build a Monster Army (怪人軍団, Kaijin Gundan) to aid them in conquering humanity. Additionally, they joined forces with psychic Kageto Banba, who created the Zeber device five years in the future to gather psychic energy so the Akumaizer can use it on Kamimura's Underworld and flood the human world with humanity-killing magic. Despite their best efforts, the Akumaizer are ultimately defeated and killed by Kamen Riders Wizard, Fourze, OOO, and their allies.
  - Zatan (ザタン): The leader of the Akumaizer who can utilize Kamimura's Underworld's magic, wields the Zalard (ザラード, Zarādo), and possesses mind control and an armored car that he later transforms into the Zaiderbeck (ザイダベック, Zaidabekku) flying warship via the Zeber's power. (Note: Zatan and the Zaiderbeck are homages to Xavitan and the Zaiderbeck from Akumaizer 3.) Zatan is voiced by Demon Kakka (デーモン閣下, Dēmon Kakka).
  - Eil (イール, Īru): (Note: Eil is an homage to Evil from Akumaizer 3.) The most agile and skilled fighter of the Akumaizer who wields the Elard (イラード, Irādo) and possesses proficiency in aerial combat and the ability to travel through time. Eil is voiced by Tomokazu Seki (関 智一, Seki Tomokazu).
  - Gahra (ガーラ, Gāra): The strongest member of the Akumaizer who wields the Galard (ガラード, Garādo) and can transform into a large monstrous bird-like form called the Gahracho (ガーラッチョ, Gāratcho). (Note: Gahra and his Gahracho form are homages to Gabra and his giant ostrich-themed form Gabratcho from Akumaizer 3.) Gahra is voiced by Yūji Mitsuya (三ツ矢 雄二, Mitsuya Yūji).
- Space Shocker (スペースショッカー, Supēsu Shokkā): Surviving members of the original Shocker terrorist organization who Strategist Raider empowered with magic to aid him in resurrecting Demon King Psycho, only to be destroyed before they can realize their dream, and appear exclusively in the crossover film Kamen Rider × Super Sentai × Space Sheriff: Super Hero Taisen Z.
  - Strategist Raider (軍師レイダー, Gunshi Reidā): A mystic who offered his services to the Space Crime Syndicate Madou before he was killed for attempting to take over the organization. After being revived by unknown means, Raider recruits Space Shocker to help him revive Psycho in order to consume the universe. Despite being killed once more by Kamen Rider Wizard and Kyoryu Red, Raider is revived as the monstrous Space Raider (スペースレイダー, Supēsu Reidā) before he is killed permanently by Kamen Rider Beast and Kyoryu Gold. Strategist Raider is portrayed by Hirotaro Honda (本田 博太郎, Honda Hirotarō).
  - Space Ikadevil (スペースイカデビル, Supēsu Ikadebiru): Space Shocker's squid-like commander who oversees the capture of Psycholon, only to be killed by the Gokaigers via the Metal Heroes' powers. (Note: Space Ikadevil is based on Ikadevil from the Kamen Rider TV series.) Space Ikadevil is voiced by Tomokazu Seki (関 智一, Seki Tomokazu).
  - Space Spider Man (スペース蜘蛛男, Supēsu Kumo Otoko): A spider-like commander of Space Shocker who dons a celestial cloak and aids in the capture of Psycholon before he is killed by Kamen Rider Fourze and Inazuman. (Note: Space Spider Man is based on Shocker warrior, Spider Man, from the first episode of the original Kamen Rider TV series.) Space Spider Man is voiced by Keikō Sakai (酒井 敬幸, Sakai Keikō).
- Demon King Psycho (魔王サイコ, Maō Saiko): The leader of the Space Crime Syndicate Madou who intended to conquer the universe through chaos decades ago before Sharivan defeated it. While it was presumed dead, it is later revealed in the crossover film Kamen Rider × Super Sentai × Space Sheriff: Super Hero Taisen Z that Psycho's consciousness continues to reside in Madou's headquarters, the Genmu Castle (幻夢城, Genmu-jō). After Raider brings the castle to Earth, Psycho is resurrected, only to be killed permanently by the Space Sheriffs, the Kyoryugers, and Kamen Rider Wizard. Demon King Psycho is voiced by Shōzō Iizuka (飯塚 昭三, Iizuka Shōzō), who reprises his role from Space Sheriff Sharivan.
- Emperor Maya (マヤ大王, Maya-daiō): The ruler of Magic Land who appears exclusively in the film Kamen Rider Wizard in Magic Land. Unlike the other residents of Magic Land, he possesses no magic power despite possessing a wizard's belt and Wizard Ring. In the real world, he is a happily married man with a wife and baby. Maya is portrayed by Shugo Oshinari (忍成 修吾, Oshinari Shūgo).
- Shiina (シイナ): A young boy and resident of Magic Land who Wajima took in as his apprentice when the former's mother was taken by a rainbow tornado and appears exclusively in the film Kamen Rider Wizard in Magic Land. After Kamen Riders Wizard and Beast kill Shiina's inner Phantom, the non-anthropomorphic Ouroboros, they negate the boy's ability to use magic. Shiina is portrayed by Tsubasa Takizawa (瀧澤 翼, Takizawa Tsubasa).
- Warlock (ワーロック, Wārokku): An ancient wizard who practices black magic, was executed by the ancient followers of science, had his soul placed in a mirror, and appears exclusively in the tie-in novel Novel: Kamen Rider Wizard. Sometime after Fueki's death, Warlock senses the Philosopher's Stone in Haruto's possession and escapes the mirror in the hopes of using the stone's power to reshape the world in his image. After failing to use a homunculus to grab the stone, Warlock creates Another Haruto and pits him against the original before successfully stealing the Philosopher's Stone. When the clone grows as strong as the original however, Warlock possesses Rinko Daimon's body and uses a Ghoul to transform into a serpentine Phantom in an attempt to kill her and bring both Harutos to despair. Nonetheless, both Harutos merge together and defeat Warlock.
- Another Haruto Soma (もう一人の操真 晴人, Mō Hitori no Sōma Haruto): A clone that Warlock created from the negative side of the original Haruto's mind who appears exclusively in the tie-in novel Novel: Kamen Rider Wizard. He initially transforms into Jet-Black Wizard (漆黒の魔法使い, Shikkoku no Mahōtsukai), before gradually absorbing mana from his opponent so he can assume Wizard's other forms. Warlock pits the Harutos against each other as part of his plot to steal the Philosopher's Stone, but the original Haruto acknowledges his fear of losing loved ones and merges with Another Haruto, which charges the Philosopher's Stone with enough energy to destroy Warlock.
