= List of Kamen Rider Gaim characters =

Five select Riders of Kamen Rider Gaim transformed. From left to right: Hideyasu Jonouchi (Kamen Rider Gridon), Kaito Kumon (Kamen Rider Baron), Kota Kazuraba (Kamen Rider Gaim), Mitsuzane Kureshima (Kamen Rider Ryugen), and Takatora Kureshima (Kamen Rider Zangetsu).

Kamen Rider Gaim (仮面ライダー鎧武(ガイム), Kamen Raidā Gaimu) (Note: "Gaim" literally means "armored warrior" (鎧武, gaimu).) is a Japanese tokusatsu series that serves as the 24th installment in the Kamen Rider franchise and the 15th entry in the Heisei era. Kota Kazuraba must use his newfound powers as the titular hero to battle the mysterious Inves monsters as well as other rival Kamen Riders, all known as "Armored Riders", in what is described by the show as a "Rider Sengoku Period" (ライダー戦国時代, Raidā Sengoku Jidai). Characters are aligned with each other as members of dance crews, or Beat Riders, and various organizations.

== Main characters ==
=== Kota Kazuraba ===
Kota Kazuraba (葛葉 紘汰, Kazuraba Kōta) is an earnest and cheerful yet naïve and short-sighted young adult who wants to help others, but sometimes ends up causing more trouble than good. He was originally the second-in-command of Team Gaim before quitting the team to pursue odd jobs and help his older sister, Akira, after their parents died, before eventually getting a job at Drupers. However, his life is changed after Team Gaim's leader Yuya Sumii arranges a meeting with Kota to show him something that could help their team. This leads Kota to search for Sumii in what he later learns is the Helheim Forest, finding a Sengoku Driver (戦極ドライバー, Sengoku Doraibā; Warring Driver) belt that his friend bought from the mysterious Lockseed Dealer Sid, and an Inves that Kota manages to destroy via the Sengoku Driver and a padlock-like Lockseed (ロックシード, Rokkushīdo) device. While figuring out how best to use his newly acquired powers, Kota witnesses his rival, Kaito Kumon's, summoned Inves go on a rampage and becomes determined to protect people as the samurai-themed Kamen Rider Gaim. After he rejoins Team Gaim in the apparently missing Sumii's stead, Kota inspires others to become Armored Riders themselves.

In the middle of the series, Kota continues his fight towards the corrupt Yggdrasil Corporation after discovering the company's shady attempts at covering up the Inves attacks with the Beat Riders being scapegoated as a result. Kota then obtains Kiwami Arms to oppose the Overlord Inves' invasion on Earth and eventually duels against Kaito in the final battle to obtain the Forbidden Fruit. When Kota emerges as the victor, he ascends to the title of Man of the Beginning, removing Helheim's influence on Earth to another planet as their new ruler alongside Mai.

Utilizing one of several Lockseeds in conjunction with the Sengoku Driver, Kota can transform into Kamen Rider Gaim. While transformed, he wields the chokutō-like Musou Saber (無双セイバー, Musō Seibā; Unrivaled Saber) pistol sword, which can combine with certain Arms Weapons (アームズウェポン, Āmuzu Wepon) to access alternate modes. His personal Lock Vehicle (ロックビークル, Rokku Bīkuru) is the Sakura Hurricane (サクラハリケーン, Sakura Harikēn) motorcycle, which is summoned from the eponymous Lockseed. Additionally, he can use other Lockseeds to assume varying Arms (アームズ, Āmuzu) forms that each possess a unique Arms Weapon, which are as follows:

- Orange Arms (オレンジアームズ, Orenji Āmuzu): Kota's default form accessed from the Orange (オレンジ, Orenji) Lockseed that grants the use of the Daidaimaru (大橙丸; Great Orange Circle) sword, which can combine with the Musou Saber to access the former's double-bladed Naginata Mode (ナギナタモード, Naginata Mōdo).
- Pine Arms (パインアームズ, Pain Āmuzu): An auxiliary form accessed from the Pine (パイン, Pain) Lockseed that grants the use of the Pine Iron (パインアイアン, Pain Aian) flail, which can combine with the Musou Saber to access the former's Kusarigama Mode (鎖鎌モード, Kusarigama Mōdo).
- Ichigo Arms (イチゴアームズ, Ichigo Āmuzu): An auxiliary form accessed from the Ichigo (イチゴ; Strawberry) Lockseed that grants the use of unlimited exploding Ichigo Kunai (イチゴクナイ).
- Suika Arms (スイカアームズ, Suika Āmuzu): An auxiliary form accessed from the Suika (スイカ; Watermelon) Lockseed that docks Kota inside a mecha also known as Suika Arms, which can switch between the humanoid Yoroi Mode (ヨロイモード, Yoroi Mōdo; Armored Mode), the spherical Oodama Mode (大玉モード, Ōdama Mōdo; Big Ball Mode), and the flying Gyro Mode (ジャイロモード, Jairo Mōdo). While assuming Yoroi Mode, he wields the Suika Sojinto (スイカ双刃刀, Suika Sōjintō; Watermelon Double-Blade Sword) naginata.
- Jimber Arms (ジンバーアームズ, Jinbā Āmuzu): An upgrade form accessed by combining the Sengoku Driver and the Genesis Core Unit (ゲネシスコアユニット, Geneshisu Koa Yunitto) slot while using the Orange Lockseed in conjunction with the former and any artificial Energy Lockseed (エナジーロックシード, Enajī Rokkushīdo) in conjunction with the latter that can switch between varying sub-forms. In these forms, Kota wields the bladed Sonic Arrow (ソニックアロー, Sonikku Arō) bow.
  - Jimber Lemon Arms (ジンバーレモンアームズ, Jinbā Remon Āmuzu): The yellow-colored evolved form of Orange Arms accessed from the Orange and Lemon Energy Lockseeds that grants superhuman strength.
  - Jimber Cherry Arms (ジンバーチェリーアームズ, Jinbā Cherī Āmuzu): The red-colored evolved form of Orange Arms accessed from the Orange and Cherry Energy Lockseeds that grants superhuman speed.
  - Jimber Peach Arms (ジンバーピーチアームズ, Jinbā Pīchi Āmuzu): The pink-colored evolved form of Orange Arms accessed from the Orange and Peach Energy Lockseeds that grants superhuman senses. However, Kota will suffer from sensory overload if exposed to higher-pitched sound waves.
- Kachidoki Arms (カチドキアームズ, Kachidoki Āmuzu): Kota's super form accessed from the Kachidoki (カチドキ; Triumph) Lockseed that grants the use of the Hinawadaiai DJ-Ju (火縄大橙DJ銃, Hinawadaidai Dī Jei Jū; Large Orange-DJ-Gun) tanegashima, which can combine with the Musou Saber to access the former's Taiken Mode (大剣モード, Taiken Mōdo; Great Sword Mode), and the twin Kachidoki Bata (カチドキ旗; Triumph Flag) sashimono.
  - Kiwami Arms (極アームズ, Kiwami Āmuzu): An evolution of Kachidoki Arms and Kota's final form accessed by combining the Sengoku Driver and the Senyo Joint (専用ジョイント, Senyō Jointo; Personal Usage Joint) slot while using the Kachidoki Lockseed in conjunction with the former and the key-like Kiwami (極; Extreme) Lockseed in conjunction with the latter that grants the ability to summon any Arms Weapon.
- Wizard Arms (ウィザードアームズ, Uizādo Āmuzu): A special form accessed from the Wizard (ウィザード, Uizādo) Lockseed that grants the use of Kamen Rider Wizard's WizarSwordGun. This form appears exclusively in the crossover film Kamen Rider × Kamen Rider Gaim & Wizard: The Fateful Sengoku Movie Battle.
- Fresh Orange Arms (フレッシュオレンジアームズ, Furesshu Orenji Āmuzu): A special form accessed from the Fresh Orange (フレッシュオレンジ, Furesshu Orenji) Lockseed that grants two pairs of the Musou Saber and Daidaimaru. This form appears exclusively in the Hyper Battle DVD special Kamen Rider Gaim: Fresh Orange Arms Is Born! ~You Can Also Seize It! The Power of Fresh~.
- 1 Arms (1号アームズ, Ichigō Āmuzu): A special form accessed from the Shōwa 15 Rider (昭和十五ライダー, Shōwa Jūgo Raidā) Lockseed channeling the 1 (1号, Ichigō) Lockseed that grants superhuman athleticism. This form appears exclusively in the crossover film Heisei Rider vs. Shōwa Rider: Kamen Rider Taisen feat. Super Sentai.
- Black Jimber Arms (ブラックジンバーアームズ, Burakku Jinbā Āmuzu): A special form accessed by combining the Sengoku Driver and Genesis Core Unit while using the Black Orange (ブラックオレンジ, Burakku Orenji) Lockseed in conjunction with the former and the Black Lemon Energy (ブラックレモンエナジー, Burakku Remon Enajī) Lockseed in conjunction with the latter that grants umbrakinesis. While assuming this form, Kota is referred to as Kamen Rider Gaim Yami (仮面ライダー鎧武・闇, Kamen Raidā Gaimu Yami). This form appears exclusively in the film Kamen Rider Gaim: Great Soccer Battle! Golden Fruits Cup!.
- Drive Arms (ドライブアームズ, Doraibu Āmuzu): A special form accessed from the Drive (ドライブ, Doraibu) Lockseed that grants the use of Kamen Rider Drive's Handle-Ken. This form appears exclusively in the crossover film Kamen Rider × Kamen Rider Drive & Gaim: Movie War Full Throttle.

Kota Kazuraba is portrayed by Gaku Sano (佐野 岳, Sano Gaku). As a child, Kota is portrayed by Hayate Torii (鳥居 颯, Torii Hayate).

=== Kaito Kumon ===
Kaito Kumon (駆紋 戒斗, Kumon Kaito) is the brooding leader of Team Baron who bears a strong hatred towards the Yggdrasil Corporation, who bought out his father's construction company as part of their redevelopment plans for Zawame. As a result, Kaito grew up in a poor household, his father became abusive towards him and his mother, and both of his parents eventually committed suicide, leading to Kaito being placed into an orphanage at a young age. This childhood cemented a survival of the fittest-like mentality in his later years and fostered a personal desire to acquire power for himself as he believes he cannot trust anyone else.

In the present day, Kaito ascends to the leadership of Team Baron and obtains the means to become the knight-themed Kamen Rider Baron (仮面ライダーバロン, Kamen Raidā Baron) as part of the Inves Games. When Yggdrasil made their move to turn the Beat Riders into scapegoats, Kaito retires from Team Baron and put Zack as his replacement leader while he launches his fight against the company as an independent Armored Rider. During the Helheim's invasion on Earth, Kaito joins forces with the rest of the Armored Riders against the invaders, but his infection and determination to reverse the status quo of the weak twisted his mind to mutate into the Overlord Inves form Lord Baron (ロード・バロン, Rōdo Baron). He fights against Kota in the duel to obtain the Forbidden Fruit, eventually acknowledging his rival's strength in his final breath.

Utilizing the Banana (バナナ) Lockseed in conjunction with the Sengoku Driver, Kaito can transform into Kamen Rider Baron Banana Arms (バナナアームズ, Banana Āmuzu). While transformed, he wields the Bana Spear (バナスピアー, Bana Supiā) lance. His personal Lock Vehicle is the Rose Attacker (ローズアタッカー, Rōzu Atakkā) motorcycle, which is summoned from the eponymous Lockseed. Additionally, he can use other Lockseeds to assume varying Arms that each possess a unique Arms Weapon, which are as follows:

- Mango Arms (マンゴーアームズ, Mangō Āmuzu): An auxiliary form accessed from the Mango (マンゴー, Mangō) Lockseed that grants the use of the Mango Punisher (マンゴパニッシャー, Mango Panisshā) mace.
- Lemon Energy Arms: Kaito's super form accessed from the Lemon Energy Lockseed in conjunction with the Genesis Driver that grants similar capabilities as Ryoma's version.
- OOO Arms (オーズアームズ, Ōzu Āmuzu): A special form accessed from the OOO (オーズ, Ōzu) Lockseed that grants the use of Kamen Rider OOO's Medajaribur. This form appears exclusively in the crossover film Kamen Rider × Kamen Rider Gaim & Wizard: The Fateful Sengoku Movie Battle.
- Ringo Arms: A special form accessed from the Ringo Lockseed that grants similar capabilities as Tōka's version. This form appears exclusively in the V-Cinema Gaim Gaiden: Kamen Rider Baron.

As Lord Baron, Kumon wields the Guronbaryamu (グロンバリャム; "Baron" in the Overlord language) longsword and possesses Overlord-esque abilities, such as creating Crack portals and being able to manipulate the Helheim Forest's flora.

During the events of the web series Kamen Sentai Gorider, Kuroto Dan arranges the resurrection of Kaito, among other deceased Kamen Riders, to lure Emu Hojo into the Game World and kill him. However, Kazuma Kenzaki arrives to help Emu and the revived Riders stop Kuroto. During the fight, Kaito assumes the form of Akarider (アカライダー, Akaraidā) before joining the other fallen Riders in sacrificing themselves to defeat Kuroto and ensure Emu and Kenkazi's escape.

Kaito Kumon is portrayed by Yutaka Kobayashi (小林 豊, Kobayashi Yutaka). As a child, Kaito is portrayed by Kurando Katayama (片山 蔵人, Katayama Kurando).

=== Mitsuzane Kureshima ===
Mitsuzane Kureshima (呉島 光実, Kureshima Mitsuzane), also known as "Micchy" (ミッチ, Mitchi) to his friends, is a smart yet manipulative member of Team Gaim who initially conceals his familial relation to his older brother Takatora and wealthy upbringing from his friends as well as his Beat Rider activities from his brother. Despite going to an elite school, Mitsuzane wishes to follow his own path rather than follow in his brother's footsteps. After his friend Kota Kazuraba is nearly killed by Kamen Rider Zangetsu, Mitsuzane convinces Sid to give him a Sengoku Driver so he can become Team Gaim's second Armored Rider, the Chinese soldier/dragon-themed Kamen Rider Ryugen (仮面ライダー龍玄, Kamen Raidā Ryūgen). (Note: "Ryugen" literally means "mysterious dragon" (龍玄, ryūgen; Chinese: 龍玄; pinyin: Lóngxuán).)

Upon discovering Takatora is Zangetsu, Mitsuzane initially resolves to uncover the truth behind the Yggdrasil Corporation's ties to the Helheim Forest. However, his desire to protect Kota and their mutual friend Mai Takatsukasa from the truth and discovery of what happened to Team Gaim member Yuya Sumii leads Mitsuzane to help Takatora conceal information on the Helheim Forest instead. Eventually in the middle of the series, Mitsuzane went insane from the influences of both the Yggdrasil workers and the Overlords, secretly opposing Kota and the Armored Riders from the shadows before his treachery is made public. He eventually falls into despair once Ryoma's manipulations caused him to seemingly kill both Kota and Mai at the same time, eventually distancing himself from his former friends out of guilt. Only through the arrival of Kogane is Mitsuzane able to obtain closure after meeting Kota again, the two finally burying the hatchet before he joins his brother in hunting the Yggdrasil remnants.

Utilizing the Budou (ブドウ, Budō; Grape) Lockseed in conjunction with the Sengoku Driver, Mitsuzane can transform into Kamen Rider Ryugen Budou Arms (ブドウアームズ, Budou Āmuzu). While transformed, he wields the Budou Ryuhou (ブドウ龍砲, Budō Ryūhō; Grape Dragon Cannon) handgun. Additionally, he can use other Lockseeds to assume varying Arms that each possess a unique Arms Weapon, which are as follows:

- Kiwi Arms (キウイアームズ, Kiui Āmuzu): An auxiliary form accessed from the Kiwi (キウイ, Kiui) Lockseed that grants the use of the twin Kiwi Gekirin (キウイ撃輪, Kiui Gekirin; Kiwi Attack Wheel) wind and fire wheels.
- Yomotsuheguri Arms (ヨモツヘグリアームズ, Yomotsuheguri Āmuzu): Mitsuzane's final form accessed from the Yomotsuheguri (ヨモツヘグリ) Lockseed that grants Overlord-like powers and the ability to summon any of his preexisting forms' Arms Weapons at the cost of crippling pain. While assuming this form, he is referred to as Kamen Rider Ryugen Yomi (仮面ライダー龍玄・黄泉, Kamen Raidā Ryūgen Yomi).
- W Arms (ダブルアームズ, Daburu Āmuzu): A special form accessed from the W (ダブル, Daburu) Lockseed that grants the use of Kamen Rider W's Trigger Magnum. This form appears exclusively in the crossover film Kamen Rider × Kamen Rider Gaim & Wizard: The Fateful Sengoku Movie Battle.

Mitsuzane later steals his brother's Genesis Driver, which he utilizes in conjunction with the Melon Energy Lockseed to transform into Kamen Rider Zangetsu Shin Melon Energy Arms. While transformed, he wields the Sonic Arrow.

Mitsuzane Kureshima is portrayed by Mahiro Takasugi (高杉 真宙, Takasugi Mahiro). As a child, Mitsuzane is portrayed by Hokuto Matsuda (松田 北斗, Matsuda Hokuto) in the TV series and Wataru Nishioka (西岡 航, Nishioka Wataru) in the V-Cinema Gaim Gaiden: Kamen Rider Zangetsu.

=== Mai Takatsukasa ===
Mai Takatsukasa (高司 舞, Takatsukasa Mai) is a member of Team Gaim who originally worked as a shrine maiden at the Takatsukasa Shrine as a child before the Yggdrasil Corporation tore it down as part of their redevelopment plans for Zawame. Having learned to dance in her youth, she believes her transition into a Beat Rider does not affect her ideals as she tries to teach the others how to dance better, becoming an older sister figure to them. During the Helheim invasion on Earth, Mai is entrusted with the Forbidden Fruit by Rosyuo to safeguard it from Redyue's machinations and ascends to the role of the Woman of the Beginning. However, her attempt at trying to alter the past gets her trapped in an alternate timeline, necessitating for Kota to win the fight against Kaito to bring her back and earning the Forbidden Fruit to himself. Mai joins Kota as the joint rulers of Helheim after the plant's influence is removed to another planet for the Inves to repopulate.

Mai Takatsukasa is portrayed by Yuumi Shida (志田 友美, Shida Yūmi). As a child, Mai is portrayed by Shiori Saeki (佐伯 栞, Saeki Shiori).

=== Takatora Kureshima ===
Takatora Kureshima (呉島 貴虎, Kureshima Takatora) is Mitsuzane's older brother and a project leader in the Yggdrasil Corporation's Research and Development branch. A realist who is willing to commit morally dubious acts for the greater good of humanity, he has a bad habit of trusting the dishonest and dearly loves his younger brother, desiring for him to do well in school so he can join the family business one day. Years prior to the series, Takatora proved instrumental in testing early prototypes for the Sengoku Driver. Despite experiencing setbacks that left him physically scarred, he eventually gained the means to become the samurai-themed Kamen Rider Zangetsu (仮面ライダー斬月, Kamen Raidā Zangetsu), (Note: "Zangetsu" literally means "slaying moon" (斬月, zangetsu).) and later into its evolution Kamen Rider Zangetsu Shin (仮面ライダー斬月・真, Kamen Raidā Zangetsu Shin), to combat the Helheim Forest's Inves.

Through his encounter with Kota and the Overlord Inves, Takatora is about to consider a safer alternative for humankind's survival but was ousted from Yggdrasil once he becomes a liability to Ryoma's plans. Takatora's attempt to reason with an insane Mitsuzane results with his fall into a coma for three months. Kota heals him after ascending to the role of the Man of the Beginning, with Takatora keeping his promise to reconcile with Mitsuzane and participating in the rebuilding of Zawame City.

Utilizing one of several Lockseeds in conjunction with the Sengoku Driver, Takatora can transform into Kamen Rider Zangetsu. While transformed, he wields the Musou Saber. Additionally, he can use other Lockseeds to assume varying Arms that each possess a unique Arms Weapon, which are as follows:

- Melon Arms (メロンアームズ, Meron Āmuzu): Takatora's default form accessed from the Melon (メロン, Meron) Lockseed that grants the use of the Melon Defender (メロンディフェンダー, Meron Difendā) shield.
- Fourze Arms (フォーゼアームズ, Fōze Āmuzu): A special form accessed from the Fourze (フォーゼ, Fōze) Lockseed that equips Takatora with Kamen Rider Fourze's Rocket Module. This form appears exclusively in the crossover film Kamen Rider × Kamen Rider Gaim & Wizard: The Fateful Sengoku Movie Battle.
- Watermelon Arms (ウォーターメロンアームズ, Wōtāmeron Āmuzu): A special form accessed from the Watermelon (ウォーターメ, Wōtāmeron) Lockseed that grants the use of the Watermelon Gatling (ウォーターメロンガトリング, Wōtāmeron Gatoringu) rotary gun/shield hybrid. This form appears exclusively in the V-Cinema Gaim Gaiden: Kamen Rider Zangetsu.
- Kachidoki Arms: Takatora's final form accessed from the Shin Kachidoki (シン・カチドキ; True Triumph) Lockseed that similar to Kota's version grants the use of the Hinawatenka-DJ-Ju (火縄甜瓜DJ銃, Hinawatenka Dī Jei Jū; Sweet Melon-DJ-Gun) tanegashima, which can combine with the Musou Saber to access the former's Taiken Mode, and the twin Kachidoki Bata. This form first appears in the stage show Kamen Rider Zangetsu: Gaim Gaiden.

As Kamen Rider Zangetsu Shin, Takatora utilizes the Melon Energy (メロンエナジー, Meron Enajī) Lockseed in conjunction with the Genesis Driver to assume Melon Energy Arms (メロンエナジーアームズ, Meron Enajī Āmuzu). While transformed, he wields the Sonic Arrow.

Takatora Kureshima is portrayed by Yuki Kubota (久保田 悠来, Kubota Yūki). As a teenager, Takatora is portrayed by Akito Ueda (上田 晟人, Ueda Akito) in the TV series and Ryūto (竜跳) in Gaim Gaiden: Kamen Rider Zangetsu.

== Recurring characters ==
=== Team Baron ===
Team Baron (チームバロン, Chīmu Baron) is a rival dance team to Team Gaim, dressed in long black and red coats. While their leader Kaito Kumon is firmly against cheating, some of his fellow group members are prone to secretly doing so during Inves Games to increase their ranks until Kaito learns of what they have done.

==== Zack ====
Zack (ザック, Zakku) is a member of Team Baron who originally serves as Kaito Kumon's second-in-command and interim leader in his absence. Formerly a member of Team Severe Beat sometime prior to the series, they were defeated by Team Baron and Zack chose to defect, going on to develop a firm loyalty to him. After stealing a mass-produced Sengoku Driver while in the Yggdrasil Corporation's custody, Kaito entrusts it and leadership of Team Baron to Zack, who goes on to become the squire/boxer-themed Kamen Rider Knuckle (仮面ライダーナックル, Kamen Raidā Nakkuru).

Utilizing the Kurumi (クルミ; Walnut) Lockseed in conjunction with the Sengoku Driver, Zack can transform into Kamen Rider Knuckle Kurumi Arms (クルミアームズ, Kurumi Āmuzu). While transformed, he is equipped with a pair of Kurumi Bomber (クルミボンバー, Kurumi Bonbā) gauntlets.

During the events of the V-Cinema Gaim Gaiden: Kamen Rider Knuckle, Zack acquires his own Genesis Core Unit and the Marron Energy (マロンエナジー, Maron Enajī; Chestnut Energy) Lockseed, which he can use in conjunction with the Sengoku Driver and Kurumi Lockseed to assume his final form; Jimber Marron Arms (ジンバーマロンアームズ, Jinbā Maron Āmuzu). In this form, he is equipped with a pair of spiked Marron Bomber (マロンボンバー, Maron Bonbā) gauntlets, which can shed their large outer shells to reveal smaller pyrokinetic gauntlets.

Zack is portrayed by Gaku Matsuda (松田 岳, Matsuda Gaku).

==== Peko ====
Peko (ペコ) is a member of Team Baron who is loyal to Kaito Kumon yet willing to engage in underhanded tactics to aid his team. After Kaito leaves Team Baron and Zack takes over leadership as Kamen Rider Knuckle, Zack provides combat support to the latter. Amidst the Inves' invasion, Zack attempts to stop Mitsuzane Kureshima from kidnapping Mai Takatsukasa, but is nearly killed by an Overlord, forcing Mai to leave with Mitsuzane. When Kaito becomes an Overlord himself, Zack tasks Peko with making contact with Oren Pierre Alfonso to help defeat Kaito before Peko helps evacuate Zawame under the direction of the Japan Self-Defense Forces. Three months after the Inves are taken from Earth, Peko joins his fellow Beat Riders in forming a unified group.

In the film Kamen Rider Gaim: Great Soccer Battle! Golden Fruits Cup!, an alternate Peko from the Soccer World possesses the ability to transform into an evolution of Kamen Rider Kurokage known as Kamen Rider Kurokage Shin (仮面ライダー黒影・真, Kamen Raidā Kurokage Shin) by utilizing the Matsubokkuri Energy (マツボックリエナジー, Matsubokkuri Enajī; Pinecone Energy) Lockseed in conjunction with the Genesis Driver to assume Matsubokkuri Energy Arms (マツボックエナジーアームズ, Matsubokkuri Enajī Āmuzu). While transformed, he wields the double-bladed Kagematsu Shin (影松真; True Shadow Pine) spear.

Peko is portrayed by Saku Momose (百瀬 朔, Momose Saku).

=== Ryoji Hase ===
Ryoji Hase (初瀬 亮二, Hase Ryōji) is the hot-headed leader of Team Raid Wild (チームレイドワイルド, Chīmu Reido Wairudo), whose members all dress in black and yellow. He initially refuses to join Team Baron's alliance until he is defeated by the group's leader Kaito Kumon's summoned Inves and Kota Kazuraba as Armored Rider Gaim, both of which convince Hase to do so. However, he later changes his mind, forms a separate alliance with Team Invitto's leader Hideyasu Jonouchi, and acquires a Sengoku Driver so he can transform into the ashigaru-themed Kamen Rider Kurokage (仮面ライダー黒影, Kamen Raidā Kurokage). (Note: "Kurokage" literally means "Black Shadow".)

Utilizing the Matsubokkuri (マツボックリ; Pinecone) Lockseed in conjunction with the Sengoku Driver, Hase can transform into Kamen Rider Kurokage Matsubokkuri Arms (マツボックリアームズ, Matsubokkuri Āmuzu). While transformed, he wields the Kagematsu (影松; Shadow Pine) yari.

Ryoji Hase is portrayed by Atsushi Shiramata (白又 敦, Shiramata Atsushi).

=== Hideyasu Jonouchi ===
Hideyasu Jonouchi (城乃内 秀保, Jōnouchi Hideyasu) is the cowardly leader and sole male member of Team Invitto (チームインヴィット, Chīmu Invitto), whose other members consist of girls. He initially joins Team Baron's alliance until he learns its leader Kaito Kumon only formed it to use the other members as pawns. In response, Jonouchi joins forces with Ryoji Hase of Team Raid Wild and obtains the means to transform into the Greek soldier-themed Kamen Rider Gridon (仮面ライダーグリドン, Kamen Raidā Guridon), but quickly becomes known as the weakest of the Armored Riders due to his lack of combat prowess and saddled with what he considers the worst name out of all them as it is simply an anagram of the Japanese word for "acorn".

Utilizing the Donguri (ドングリ; Acorn) Lockseed in conjunction with the Sengoku Driver, Jonouchi can transform into Kamen Rider Gridon Donguri Arms (ドングリアームズ, Donguri Āmuzu). While transformed, he wields the Donkachi (ドンカチ) war hammer.

During the events of the web special Gaim Gaiden: Kamen Rider Gridon vs. Kamen Rider Bravo, Jonouchi acquires the Lychee (ライチ, Raichi) Lockseed, which allows him to assume his final form; Lychee Arms (ライチアームズ, Raichi Āmuzu). In this form, he wields the Shine Donkachi (シャインドンカチ, Shain Donkachi) war hammer and the Shine Lychee Sword (シャインライチソード, Shain Raichi Sōdo).

Hideyasu Jonouchi is portrayed by Ryo Matsuda (松田 凌, Matsuda Ryō).

=== Alfonso Pierre Oren ===
Alfonso Pierre Oren (凰蓮・ピエール・アルフォンゾ, Ōren Piēru Arufonzo), born Gennosuke Oren (凰蓮 厳之介, Ōren Gennosuke), is an effeminate and muscular Parachute Regiment veteran who spent a decade in France to become a pâtissier and went on to become the owner of the Charmant (シャルモン, Sharumon) pastry shop in Zawame City. Disgusted by the Beat and Armored Riders' perceived destruction of art and being amateurs in combat, Oren confiscates Rider equipment from a Beat Rider so he can join the fray and show them how a true fight is meant to be fought as the gladiator/iron maiden-themed Kamen Rider Bravo (仮面ライダーブラーボ, Kamen Raidā Burābo).

Utilizing the Durian (ドリアン, Dorian) Lockseed in conjunction with the Sengoku Driver, Alfonso can transform into Kamen Rider Bravo Durian Arms (ドリアンアームズ, Dorian Āmuzu). While transformed, he dual wields the twin serrated Duri Noko (ドリノコ; Durian Saw) swords.

During the events of the web special Gaim Gaiden: Kamen Rider Gridon vs. Kamen Rider Bravo, Alfonso acquires the King Durian (キングドリアン, Kingu Dorian) Lockseed, which allows him to assume his final form; King Durian Arms (キングドリアンアームズ, Kingu Dorian Āmuzu). In this form, he dual wields the twin serrated Giga Duri Noko (ギガドリノコ; Giga Durian Saw) swords. Initially, this form caused Oren to assume a berserker state until he learned to control it.

Alfonso Pierre Oren is portrayed by Metal Yoshida (吉田 メタル, Yoshida Metaru).

=== Yggdrasill Corporation ===
The Yggdrasill Corporation Company Ltd. (ユグドラシルコーポレーション, Yugudorashiru Kōporēshon) is a powerful multinational conglomerate and research organization largely dedicated to stopping the Helheim Forest from overrunning the Earth. After detecting a high frequency of Cracks in Zawame City (沢芽市, Zawame-shi), the company established the Yggdrasil Tower (ユグドラシルタワー, Yugudorashiru Tawā) around the city's "sacred tree" for research purposes, disguising their true agenda by using their expertise in several fields and socioeconomic aspects of city-dwelling to redevelop Zawame to prevent widespread panic amongst the populace. Due to their omnipresence however, many of Zawame's citizens feel as if they are living in a "jōkamachi (城下町, castle town)" rather than a bustling city. Yggdrasil also establishes the Inves Games and the Armored Riders to further their research and draw attention away from it as well as create weapons to repel Helheim's inhabitants.

==== Sid ====
Lock Dealer Sid (錠前ディーラー シド, Jōmae Dīrā Shido) is one of Takatora Kureshima's subordinates who aids him by selling Lockseeds and Sengoku Drivers to the Beat Riders for the Inves Games. While he works for Yggdrasil, Sid's intentions are dubious at best as he is willing to aid various parties and withhold information on Mitsuzane Kureshima from Takatora. Prior to the series, Sid was part of a group of drug dealers who were suddenly attacked by Inves while they were in Zawame City. He survived the attack after being saved by Ryoma Sengoku and recruited into Yggdrasil. He is later given a Genesis Driver, allowing him to become the Viking-themed Kamen Rider Sigurd (仮面ライダーシグルド, Kamen Raidā Shigurudo).

Utilizing the Cherry Energy (チェリーエナジー, Cherī Enajī) Lockseed in conjunction with the Genesis Driver, Sid can transform into Kamen Rider Sigurd Cherry Energy Arms (チェリーエナジーアームズ, Cherī Enajī Āmuzu). While transformed, he wields the Sonic Arrow.

Sid is portrayed by Kazuki Namioka (波岡 一喜, Namioka Kazuki).

==== Ryoma Sengoku ====
Ryoma Sengoku (戦極 凌馬, Sengoku Ryōma) is a brilliant yet highly eccentric and immoral scientist in the Yggdrasil Corporation's research division. He conducts experiments to develop the Armored Riders' Sengoku Drivers as part of Project Ark, a plan established by Yggdrasil to save one-seventh of the human population by providing them the means to obtain nutrients from Helheim Forest fruits without mutating into Inves. He was originally an orphan until he was taken in by Yggdrasil's owner, Amagi Kureshima, who recognized the boy's talents and potential for furthering Yggdrasil's goals. Over the years, Ryoma would go on to become Amagi's right hand, develop Lockseeds, and become acquainted with Amagi's eldest son, Takatora Kureshima. Despite this, Ryoma grew to see the latter as a fool for trying to save humanity first and lacking his father's ambition, leading to Ryoma secretly acting on his own agenda by obtaining the Forbidden Fruit and acquiring its power rather than save the world from the Inves. Following the events of the crossover film Kamen Rider × Kamen Rider Gaim & Wizard: The Fateful Sengoku Movie Battle, Ryoma presents the completed Genesis Driver (ゲネシスドライバー, Geneshisu Doraibā) belts to Takatora and other select Yggdrasil members while keeping one for himself so he can become the European knight-themed Kamen Rider Duke (仮面ライダーデューク, Kamen Raidā Dyūku).

Utilizing the Lemon Energy (レモンエナジー, Remon Enajī) Lockseed with the Genesis Driver, Ryoma can transform into Kamen Rider Duke Lemon Energy Arms (レモンエナジーアームズ, Remon Enajī Āmuzu). While transformed, he wields the Sonic Arrow.

During the events of the crossover film Kamen Rider × Kamen Rider Drive & Gaim: Movie War Full Throttle, Megahex creates a robotic copy of Ryoma who utilizes the Dragon Fruit Energy (ドラゴンフルーツエナジー, Dorangon Furūtsu Enajī) Lockseed in conjunction with the Genesis Driver to transform into Kamen Rider Duke Dragon Energy Arms (ドラゴンエナジーアームズ, Doragon Enajī Āmuzu). Like the original Ryoma, he wields the Sonic Arrow while transformed. He is destroyed by Kamen Rider Zangetsu.

During the events of the V-Cinema Gaim Gaiden: Kamen Rider Duke, Ryoma's past reveals that he originally transformed into Kamen Rider Duke by utilizing the Lemon (レモン, Remon) Lockseed in conjunction with the Sengoku Driver to assume Lemon Arms (レモンアームズ, Remon Āmuzu). In this form, he wielded the Lemon Rapier (レモンレイピア, Remon Reipia).

Ryoma Sengoku is portrayed by Tsunenori Aoki (青木 玄徳, Aoki Tsunenori).

==== Yoko Minato ====
Yoko Minato (湊 耀子, Minato Yōko) is a former FBI agent and bodyguard for Ryoma Sengoku, whom he gives a Genesis Driver to so she can transform into the Arabian soldier-themed Kamen Rider Marika (仮面ライダーマリカ, Kamen Raidā Marika) following the events of the crossover film Kamen Rider × Kamen Rider Gaim & Wizard: The Fateful Sengoku Movie Battle. Despite being a member of Yggdrasil and taking orders from Takatora Kureshima, her loyalties initially lie with Ryoma. She later allies herself with Kaito after he becomes an Over Lord, believing his strength to be worth following into the future.

Utilizing the Peach Energy (ピーチエナジー, Pīchi Enajī) Lockseed in conjunction with the Genesis Driver, Yoko can transform into Kamen Rider Marika Peach Energy Arms (ピーチエナジーアームズ, Pīchi Enajī Āmuzu). While transformed, she wields the Sonic Arrow.

During the events of the web series Kamen Sentai Gorider, Kuroto Dan arranges the resurrection of Yoko, among other deceased Kamen Riders, to lure Emu Hojo into the Game World and kill him. However, Kazuma Kenzaki arrives to help Emu and the revived Riders stop Kuroto. During the fight, Yoko assumes the form of Momorider (モモライダー, Momoraidā) before joining the other fallen Riders in sacrificing themselves to defeat Kuroto and ensure Emu and Kenkazi's escape.

Yoko Minato is portrayed by Minami Tsukui (佃井 皆美, Tsukui Minami).

==== Kurokage Troopers ====
The Kurokage Troopers (黒影トルーパー, Kurokage Torūpā) are the Yggdrasil Corporation's privately owned soldiers who function as support for their employers and are normally dispatched into Zawame City's streets to destroy any evidence related to the Helheim Forest. Similarly to their template Kamen Rider Kurokage, they utilize plentiful Matsubokkuri Lockseeds in conjunction with mass-produced versions of the Sengoku Driver to transform. While transformed, they each carry a Kagematsu. Their personal Lock Vehicles are the Dandeliner (ダンデライナー, Danderainā) hoverbike and the Tulip Hopper (チューリップホッパー, Chūrippu Hoppā) walker, which are summoned from their eponymous Lockseeds.

=== Drupers ===
Drupers (ドルーパーズ, Dorūpāzu) is a "fruit parlor" (フルーツパーラー, furūtsu pārā) known for selling fruit parfaits and being Zawame City's most popular location amongst youths, especially the Beat Rider dance teams. Amidst the Inves' invasion, Drupers remains open and serves as a secondary base for the Armored Riders until the Japanese Self-Defense Forces arrive and close down the store to evacuate Zawame. As of the film Kamen Rider × Kamen Rider Drive & Gaim: Movie War Full Throttle, Drupers has long since re-opened and entered a partnership with the pastry shop Charmant.

==== Kiyojiro Bando ====
Kiyojiro Bando (阪東 清治郎, Bandō Kiyojirō) is the owner of Drupers who offers advice to his customers and cheers them up with a parfait.

Kiyojiro Bando is portrayed by Tomohisa Yuge (弓削 智久, Yuge Tomohisa).

==== Iyo ====
Iyo (イヨ) is Bando's only staff member and waitress capable of holding her own in combat, having trained in the use of a bō and nunchaku.

Iyo is portrayed by Yui Natsuki (那月 結衣, Natsuki Yui).

=== "DJ Sagara" ===
"DJ Sagara" (DJサガラ, Dī Jei Sagara) is the immortal embodiment of the Helheim Forest's will whose task is to observe and hasten evolution and see the future unfold in terms of who can obtain the Helheim Forest's power, the Golden Fruit, believing that one must shine to be remembered by others. He initially appears as a supporter of the Yggdrasil Corporation, operating as the DJ of a pirate radio station and host of the Beat Riders Hotline internet show to promote the Inves Games, and setting up much of Zawame City's Beat Riders (ビートライダーズ, Bīto Raidāzu) and Armored Riders (アーマードライダー, Āmādo Raidā).

DJ Sagara is portrayed by Tomomitsu Yamaguchi (山口 智充, Yamaguchi Tomomitsu).

=== Inves ===
The Inves (インベス, Inbesu), the name of which was derived from the term "invasive species", are monsters who hail from the alternate reality of the Helheim Forest (ヘルヘイムの森, Heruheimu no Mori). They were originally part of the Femushinmu race before the forest consumed their civilization and the inhabitants ate Helheim fruit, which mutated them into monsters. The Inves were originally believed to be products of the popular Inves Games (インベスゲーム, Inbesu Gēmu), created by the Yggdrasil Corporation, that can be summoned to Zawame City via Lockseeds, which open zipper-like Crack (クラック, Kurakku) portals.

==== Overlords ====
The Overlord Inves (オーバーロードインベス, Ōbārōdo Inbesu) are powerful, evolved Inves who rose above the ordinary kind, maintained their intelligence, gained the ability to manipulate the Helheim Forest's plant life, and teleport. Like the regular Inves, the Overlords were once the Femushinmu (フェムシンム) race, (Note: The Overlords' language is a cipher of the Japanese language. Additionally, "Femushinmu" translates into Japanese as ningen (人間, "human") and their names are simply their armor's color or animal motif translated from Japanese into the Overlord language.) the dominant species of their world before Helheim consumed it.

===== Dēmushu =====
Dēmushu (デェムシュ) (Note: Which translates into Japanese as "crimson" (深紅, shinku).) is a hot-tempered, anger-prone brute who enjoys fighting, seeing humans as weak "dyoburyo" (デョブリョ), (Note: The Overlord "dyoburyo" translates into Japanese as saru (猿, "ape").) that deserve death by someone as strong as himself. He is the first of the Overlords that the Armored Riders encounter, with Kaito Kumon being his first opponent after Dēmushu struggles to communicate with him despite consulting a dictionary.

Dēmushu is voiced by Tomokazu Sugita (杉田 智和, Sugita Tomokazu).

===== Redyue =====
Redyue (レデュエ) (Note: Which translates into Japanese as "jade" (翡翠, hisui).) is a feminine, sinister, and sadistic Overlord who uses others as her personal play things until she discards them when they are of no more use to her. After the Armored Riders arrive in Helheim, she quickly takes to manipulating them, having lived in boredom after the Femushinmu civilization collapsed. Following an encounter with Mitsuzane Kureshima and Sid, Redyue feigns defeat before leading them to the Forbidden Fruit and manipulating the latter into attacking Roshuo. She later reveals to Mitsuzane her desire to claim the Forbidden Fruit's power for herself. To achieve this, she convinces Roshuo to give her the fruit in exchange for using Earth's technology to revive his queen, with the intention of betraying him later on. However, the Armored Riders' allies rescue her prisoners while she is furious to learn that Roshuo had already given the Forbidden Fruit to someone else and kills him before she is in turn killed by Kamen Rider Gaim.

Redyue is voiced by Kenjiro Tsuda (津田 健次郎, Tsuda Kenjirō).

===== Roshuo =====
Roshuo (ロシュオ) (Note: Which translates into Japanese as "chalk" (白亜, hakua).) is the leader of the Overlords who normally rests deep within the ruins of his former civilization and believes humans are no different from the Femushinmu. Having endured Helheim while it was consuming his world, Roshuo became its king and used the Forbidden Fruit to turn the world into one that reflects his ideals of the strong ruling over the weak. However, as those blessed by the forest slaughter those unable to fight back, Roshuo learned too late that his wish caused a conflict that destroyed the Femushinmu civilization, with his queen among the casualties. Expressing disgust for conflict, Roshuo uses his incredible psychic power to keep the remaining Overlords in check. He also observes Yggdrasil's research team, particularly their technology capable of using a Lockseed's power without turning their owner into an Inves.

Roshuo is voiced by Jōji Nakata (中田 譲治, Nakata Jōji).

===== Minor Overlords =====
- Dyudyuonshu (デュデュオンシュ): A Vermilion Bird-themed Overlord who serves under Redyue and wields the Dēngoshuimu (デェンゴシュイム) snake sword, which is capable of channeling and redirecting energy attacks. He is tasked with aiding Mitsuzane in an attempt on Kota's life, only to be destroyed by Kota as Kamen Rider Gaim. Dyudyuonshu is voiced by Yōji Ueda (上田 燿司, Ueda Yōji).
- Gurinsha (グリンシャ): A cattle-themed Overlord who serves as Roshuo's guard and personal soldier, and wields the Aashuimu (アアシュイム) large sword. Tasked with assisting Redyue, he leads Inves in abducting Zawame's citizens so she can use them as batteries for her revival machine. He is destroyed by Kamen Riders Gaim and Baron. Gurinsha is voiced by Yuuki Anai (穴井 勇輝, Anai Yūki).
- Shinmugurun (シンムグルン): A Black Tortoise-themed Overlord who serves under Redyue and wields the Dimubu (ディムブ) battle axe. He is destroyed by Kamen Rider Gaim.
- Queen (王妃, Ōhi): Roshuo's deceased wife who served as the Femushinmu civilization's Maiden of Fate, bestowing Roshuo the Femushinmu and humanity's Forbidden Fruits. Roshuo attempts to revive her via the fruits and human sacrifices, but the Armored Riders' allies foil the latter while he is convinced to relinquish humanity's Golden Fruit. She initially appears in silhouette within Roshuo's memories until his death, during which she appears to him as a spirit to comfort him. The queen is portrayed by Hiromi Iwasaki (岩崎 ひろみ, Iwasaki Hiromi).

=== Akira Kazuraba ===
Akira Kazuraba (葛葉 晶, Kazuraba Akira) is Kota's older sister. Following their parents' deaths, she takes on an office job at an Yggdrasil Corporation-affiliated company. After learning her brother became Armored Rider Gaim, she becomes protective of him, though she comes to understand that he has his own desires and advises him on how best to use his abilities for the good of others. Unbeknownst to Akira, she is targeted by her employers, who seek to make Kota give up his Rider powers.

Akira Kazuraba is portrayed by Rika Izumi (泉 里香, Izumi Rika).

== Guest characters ==
- Team Gaim (チーム鎧武, Chīmu Gaimu): Kota Kazuraba, Mitsuzane Kureshima, and Mai Takatsukasa's Beat Rider group clad in modern Happi-themed outfits.
  - Chucky (チャッキー, Chakkī): A tomboy member of Team Gaim and one of its best dancers. During the Inves' invasion, she provides medical assistance. Months after the Inves are taken from Earth, Chucky joins the other Beat Riders in forming a combined dance troupe. In the tie-in novel Novel: Kamen Rider Gaim, Chucky assists the Armored Riders in their fight against the Black Linden cult by going undercover as a follower of the latter group. Chucky is portrayed by Kanon Tsuyama (津山 香音, Tsuyama Kanon).
  - Rica (リカ, Rika): A member of Team Gaim who is not as good as Chucky, but makes up for it by encouraging her friends. Months after the Inves are taken from Earth, Rica joins the other Beat Riders in forming a combined dance troupe. Rica is portrayed by Miina Yokota (横田 美菜, Yokota Miina).
  - Rat (ラット, Ratto): A member of Team Gaim who prefers flashy performances and often manages to bring up the team's mood after losses despite pushing his luck too far at times. After sustaining injuries while protecting Rica from the Bixie Inves, he is temporarily hospitalized and released shortly afterward upon testing negative for the Inves infection. Months after the Inves are taken from Earth, Rat joins the other Beat Riders in forming a combined dance troupe. Rat is portrayed by Ren Ozawa (小澤 廉, Ozawa Ren).
  - Yuya Sumii (角居 裕也, Sumii Yūya): The former leader of Team Gaim who went missing in the Helheim Forest after obtaining a Sengoku Driver from Sid. When Kota Kazuraba and Mai Takatsukasa stumble into the Helheim Forest in search of Yuya, they find his Sengoku Driver before the White Tiger Inves (ビャッコインベス, Byakko Inbesu) attacks them. It follows them into the human world, where Kota transforms into Kamen Rider Gaim and destroys the Inves. Weeks later, while accessing the Yggdrasil Corporation's database, Mitsuzane learns that the White Tiger Inves was actually Yuya, who had transformed after he ate a Helheim Fruit. Though Mitsuzane tries to protect him from the truth, Kota is horrified once he learns that he unknowingly killed his friend before eventually making peace with the revelation. Yuya Sumii is portrayed by Hiromi Sakimoto (崎本 大海, Sakimoto Hiromi).
- Sonomura (曽野村): The leader of the Beat Rider group Team Red Hot (チームレッドホット, Chīmu Reddo Hotto), whose members wear red, flame-themed clothing. Motivated by fame and freedom, he acquires a Sengoku Driver and the Durian Lockseed from the Lockseed Dealer Sid to challenge the other Beat Riders. However, he loses the equipment to Oren Pierre Alfonso. When the Beat Riders are framed for the Inves's infectious properties, Sonomura and his team take advantage by stealing Lockseeds and using them to summon Inves to help them commit robberies. When they are confronted by Kota Kazuraba, Sonomura uses a Lockseed to summon a Lion Inves, but the device shorts out and the monster nearly kills him until Kota destroys it. Sonomura is portrayed by Takashi Kitadai (北代 高士, Kitadai Takashi).
- Ressha Sentai ToQger (烈車戦隊トッキュウジャー, Ressha Sentai Tokkyūjā): A group of children - Right, Tokatti, Mio, Hikari, and Kagura - with powerful imaginations who were aged up into young adults and recruited by the Rainbow Line to fight the Shadow Line. After making a stop in Zawame City, they cross paths with Kamen Rider Gaim while fighting members of the Badan Empire. Right, Tokatti, Mio, Hikari, and Kagura are portrayed by Jun Shison (志尊 淳, Shison Jun), Jin Hiramaki (平牧 仁, Hiramaki Jin), Riria Kojima (梨里杏), Ryusei Yokohama (横浜 流星, Yokohama Ryūsei), and Ai Moritaka (森高 愛, Moritaka Ai) respectively, who all reprise their roles from Ressha Sentai ToQger.
- Jiro (ジロー, Jirō) / Kikaider (キカイダー, Kikaidā): An amnesiac android who Kota discovers and takes care of. While helping Jiro find his purpose, Kota discovers a reboot button on his back. While Jiro initially refuses to undergo the process, fearing he will become violent, he ultimately relents and leaves to fulfill his programming. Jiro / Kikaider is portrayed by Jingi Irie (入江 甚儀, Irie Jingi), ahead of his appearance in the film Kikaider Reboot.
- Hakaider (ハカイダー, Hakaidā): An android created by the DARK Project that Ryoma Sengoku temporarily transplants his brain into as a favor to a colleague in the organization before returning to his own body due to Hakaider's programming influencing his personality.

== Spin-off characters ==
=== Sengoku Period ===
The Sengoku Period (戦極時代, Sengoku Jidai), also known as World of Bujin (武神の世界, Bujin no Sekai), is an alternate reality that is reminiscent of Japan's historical Sengoku period that the Armored Riders entered through atypical Cracks in the Helheim Forest. This reality is exclusive to the crossover film Kamen Rider × Kamen Rider Gaim & Wizard: The Fateful Sengoku Movie Battle.

==== Bujin Riders ====
The Bujin Riders, or simply Bujin (武神), are alternate reality versions of the 14 Heisei Kamen Riders who preceded Gaim who each serve as a lord's champion. They are all defeated by Kamen Rider Bujin Gaim and consumed by the Pitcher Plant Monster:

- Kamen Rider Bujin Kuuga (仮面ライダー武神クウガ, Kamen Raidā Bujin Kūga)
- Kamen Rider Bujin Agito (仮面ライダー武神アギト, Kamen Raidā Bujin Agito)
- Kamen Rider Bujin Ryuki (仮面ライダー武神龍騎, Kamen Raidā Bujin Ryūki)
- Kamen Rider Bujin Faiz (仮面ライダー武神ファイズ, Kamen Raidā Bujin Faizu)
- Kamen Rider Bujin Blade (仮面ライダー武神ブレイド, Kamen Raidā Bujin Bureido)
- Kamen Rider Bujin Hibiki (仮面ライダー武神響鬼, Kamen Raidā Bujin Hibiki)
- Kamen Rider Bujin Kabuto (仮面ライダー武神カブト, Kamen Raidā Bujin Kabuto)
- Kamen Rider Bujin Den-O (仮面ライダー武神電王, Kamen Raidā Bujin Den'ō)
- Kamen Rider Bujin Kiva (仮面ライダー武神キバ, Kamen Raidā Bujin Kiba)
- Kamen Rider Bujin Decade (仮面ライダー武神ディケイド, Kamen Raidā Bujin Dikeido)
- Kamen Rider Bujin W (仮面ライダー武神W(ダブル), Kamen Raidā Bujin Daburu), who serves under Hideyoshi.
- Kamen Rider Bujin OOO (仮面ライダー武神オーズ, Kamen Raidā Bujin Ōzu), who serves under Nobunaga.
- Kamen Rider Bujin Fourze (仮面ライダー武神フォーゼ, Kamen Raidā Bujin Fōze)
- Kamen Rider Bujin Wizard (仮面ライダー武神ウィザード, Kamen Raidā Bujin Wizādo), who serves under Ieyasu.

The Bujin Riders are voiced by Tatsuya Takagi (高木 達也, Takagi Tatsuya) and Yuma Uchida (内田 雄馬, Uchida Yūma).

==== Kamen Rider Bujin Gaim ====
Kamen Rider Bujin Gaim (仮面ライダー武神鎧武, Kamen Raidā Bujin Gaimu) is an alternate reality version of Kamen Rider Gaim and a Bujin Rider who is considered the strongest Bujin. While attempting to obtain the power of his universe's sacred tree, he kills all of the Bujin Riders and attempts to kidnap the Maiden of Fate. However, he inadvertently kidnaps the Maiden's past self, Mai Takatsukasa, instead. He later merges with the sacred tree in an attempt to destroy the Armored Riders, but is killed by Kamen Riders Gaim and Wizard.

Utilizing the Blood Orange (ブラッドオレンジ, Buraddo Orenji) Lockseed in conjunction with the Sengoku Driver, this Bujin can transform into Kamen Rider Bujin Gaim Blood Orange Arms (ブラッドオレンジアームズ, Buraddo Orenji Āmuzu). While transformed, he wields the Musou Saber and the Blood Daidaimaru (ブラッド大橙丸, Buraddo Daidaimaru; Blood Great Orange Circle) sword, which can combine to access the latter's Naginata Mode. After fusing himself with the sacred tree, he assumes his Lotus Position (蓮華座, Renge-za) form.

Kamen Rider Bujin Gaim is voiced by Rikiya Koyama (小山 力也, Koyama Rikiya).

==== Pitcher Plant Monster ====
The Pitcher Plant Monster (ウツボカズラ怪人, Utsubokazura Kaijin) is a monster that serves under Bujin Gaim and consumes the Bujin Riders to use their energy in the sacred tree. On Bujin Gaim's orders, the monster attacks the Armored Riders' dimension to kidnap the Maiden of Fate, only to grab Mai Takatsukasa instead. Her friends pursue the monster to the Sengoku dimension, but the Pitcher Plant Monster forces them to retreat. After attacking and capturing Kamen Rider Beast, Kamen Rider Wizard enters the Sengoku dimension to save his ally. The Pitcher Plant Monster is later killed by Kamen Riders Beast, Baron, Ryugen, and Zangetsu.

The Pitcher Plant Monster is voiced by Hiroyuki Yoshino (吉野 裕行, Yoshino Hiroyuki).

==== Ieyasu ====
Ieyasu (イエヤス) is the lord of the Wizard Army (ウィザード軍, Wizādo-gun) who loses his Bujin, Kamen Rider Bujin Wizard, to Kamen Rider Bujin Gaim. Initially mistaking Kota Kazuraba for his Bujin's killer before realizing his mistake, Ieyasu hires the youth and Mitsuzane to become his new Bujins.

Ieyasu is portrayed by JOY.

==== Hideyoshi ====
Hideyoshi (ヒデヨシ) is the lord of the W Army (W(ダブル)軍, Daburu-gun) and the Sengoku Period counterpart of Ryu Terui. He leads Kamen Rider Bujin W into battle against Bujin Gaim, but loses his Bujin to Zangetsu.

Hideyoshi is portrayed by Minehiro Kinomoto (木ノ本 嶺浩, Kinomoto Minehiro).

==== Chacha ====
Chacha (チャチャ) is married to Hideyoshi and the Sengoku Period counterpart of Akiko Terui (née Narumi).

Chacha is portrayed by Hikaru Yamamoto (山本 ひかる, Yamamoto Hikaru).

==== Nobunaga ====
Nobunaga (ノブナガ) is the lord of the OOO Army (オーズ軍, Ōzu-gun) and the Sengoku Period counterpart of Akira Date. He sacrifices himself while rescuing his attendant Ranmaru from Bujin Gaim's army.

Nobunaga is portrayed by Hiroaki Iwanaga (岩永 洋昭, Iwanaga Hiroaki).

==== Ranmaru ====
Ranmaru (ランマル) is a female attendant who serves under Nobunaga in the OOO Army. After Bujin OOO is killed by Bujin Gaim and Nobunaga sacrifices himself to save her, she makes Kamen Rider Baron the new lord and Bujin of the OOO Army.

Ranmaru is portrayed by Mao Ueda (上田 眞央, Ueda Mao).

==== Fourze Army Warlord ====
The unnamed Fourze Army Warlord (フォーゼ軍武将, Fōze-gun Bushō) is an ally to Ieyasu's Wizard Army and the Sengoku Period counterpart of Kengo Utahoshi.

The Fourze Army Warlord is portrayed by Ryuki Takahashi (高橋 龍輝, Takahashi Ryūki).

==== Kiva Army Warlord ====
The unnamed Kiva Army Warlord (キバ軍武将, Kiba-gun Bushō) is a rival to the Fourze Army Warlord and the Sengoku Period counterpart of Keisuke Nago / Kamen Rider IXA.

The Kiva Army Warlord is portrayed by Keisuke Kato (加藤 慶祐, Katō Keisuke).

=== Shu Aoi ===
Shu Aoi (葵 終, Aoi Shū) is the deceased son of Ren and Saki Aoi, having died in a car crash a year prior, who appears exclusively in the crossover film Heisei Rider vs. Shōwa Rider: Kamen Rider Taisen feat. Super Sentai. The former joins the Badan Empire to revive his son, only to be brainwashed so they can use Shu's powerful imagination to revive an army of monsters and destroy the world. However, Shu's powers revive him during the revival ceremony, leading to him running away and becoming part of a plan by the Shōwa and Heisei Riders to defeat Badan. Once the Riders succeed, with help from Kyoryu Red and the ToQgers, the Shōwa Riders use the Rider Syndrome (ライダーシンドローム, Raidā Shindorōmu) to free Ren of his brainwashing and temporarily reunite the Aoi family before Shu's spirit comes to rest.

Shu Aoi is portrayed by Yuzu Aoki (青木 柚, Aoki Yuzu).

=== Saki Aoi ===
Saki Aoi (葵 咲, Aoi Saki) is the wife of Ren Aoi and mother of Shu Aoi who appears exclusively in the crossover film Heisei Rider vs. Shōwa Rider: Kamen Rider Taisen feat. Super Sentai.

Saki Aoi is portrayed by Akiko Hinagata (雛形 あきこ, Hinagata Akiko).

=== Badan Empire ===
The Underground Empire Badan (地下帝国バダン, Chika Teikoku Badan), or Badan Empire for short, is an amalgamation of all of the previous evil groups that the first nine Shōwa Riders faced who wish to achieve world dominion, only to be foiled by the turncoat Kamen Rider ZX. Literally going underground, Badan resurfaces during the events of the crossover special Ressha Sentai ToQger vs. Kamen Rider Gaim: Spring Break Combined Special and the crossover film Heisei Rider vs. Shōwa Rider: Kamen Rider Taisen feat. Super Sentai.

==== Ren Aoi ====
Ren Aoi (葵 連, Aoi Ren) is the husband of Saki Aoi and father of Shu Aoi who sought to revive his dead son, only to be to brainwashed by Badan into becoming their enforcer, Kamen Rider Fifteen (仮面ライダーフィフティーン, Kamen Raidā Fifutīn). After being defeated by Kamen Rider Gaim, he is freed from his brainwashing and temporarily reunites with his family before Shu returns to the afterlife.

Utilizing the Fifteen (フィフティーン, Fifutīn) Lockseed in conjunction with the Sengoku Driver, Ren can transform into Kamen Rider Fifteen Fifteen Arms (フィフティーンアームズ, Fifutīn Āmuzu). While transformed, he wields the Yomimaru (黄泉丸; Underworld Circle) sword. He also possesses the Heisei 15 Rider (平成十五ライダー, Heisei Jūgo Raidā) Lockseed, which allows him to channel any Legend Rider (レジェンドライダー, Rejendo Raidā) Lockseed and assume varying Rider Arms (ライダーアームズ, Raidā Āmuzu) forms, such as the following:

- Wizard Arms: An auxiliary form accessed by channeling the Wizard Lockseed that grants similar capabilities as Kota's version.
- Decade Arms (ディケイドアームズ, Dikeido Āmuzu): An auxiliary form accessed by channeling the Decade (ディケイド, Dikeido) Lockseed that grants the combined powers of Kamen Rider Decade's nine Heisei Kamen Rider predecessors. In this form, Ren wields Decade's Ride Booker.
- Fourze Arms: An auxiliary form accessed by channeling the Fourze Lockseed that unlike Takatora's version grants the use of Kamen Rider Fourze's Billy the Rod and/or Barizun Sword.
- Gaim Arms (鎧武アームズ, Gaimu Āmuzu): Ren's final form accessed by channeling the Gaim (鎧武, Gaimu) Lockseed that grants the use of the Musou Saber and Daidaimaru.

Ren Aoi is portrayed by Itsuji Itao (板尾 創路, Itao Itsuji).

==== Moguraroid Brothers ====
The Moguraroid (モグラロイド, Moguraroido) Brothers are twin mole-themed Badan cyborgs tasked with digging holes to bring their compatriots to the surface. The elder brother accidentally opens Cracks that summon Inves before he is destroyed by Kamen Rider Gaim while the younger brother is destroyed by the ToQgers.

The Moguraroid brothers are both voiced by Kyousei Tsukui (津久井 教生, Tsukui Kyōsei).

=== The Soccer World ===
The Soccer World is an alternate timeline created by Lapis, who grew tired of bloodshed and war, that appears exclusively in the film Kamen Rider Gaim: Great Soccer Battle! Golden Fruits Cup!.

==== Kogane ====
Kogane (コウガネ, Kōgane) is a manifestation of the Forbidden Fruit created by the previous Overlords in the past. When one of Ryoma Sengoku's experiments goes awry, Kogane awakens and kills him before taking on the form of a middle-aged man and creating a Locust Monster to either possess a human host to revive themself or infect humans and turn them into mindless monsters. Because of their existence on Earth, Kogane causes most of the Armored Riders to turn against each other in their search for the Golden Fruit. All the while, they masquerade as Yuya Sumii to get close to and manipulate Kota Kazuraba. They later defeat and brainwash him into becoming its vassal, Kamen Rider Gaim Yami, to hunt down Lapis. However, Lapis enters Kota's mind and works to free him from Kogane's control. After losing their vassal, Kogane transforms into the European knight-themed Kamen Rider Mars (仮面ライダーマルス, Kamen Raidā Marusu) (Note: "Mars" comes from both the planet Mars and Malus, the genus of the apple tree.) to destroy the Armored Riders, only to be defeated by them.

In the series finale, a time distortion causes Kogane to arrive in the primary timeline, where they possess a teenage girl to become the samurai-themed Kamen Rider Jam (仮面ライダー邪武, Kamen Raidā Jamu) (Note: "Jam" literally translates as "evil warrior" (邪武, jamu).) and seek revenge against the Armored Riders. They defeat Hideyasu Jonouchi, but after being cornered by Kamen Rider Ryugen, Kogane attempts to use their host as leverage until the primary timeline Kota returns to Earth and helps Ryugen free the girl and defeat Kogane, destroying them permanently.

Initially utilizing the Golden Ringo (金のリンゴ, Kin no Ringo) Lockseed in conjunction with the Sengoku Driver, Kogane can transform into Kamen Rider Mars Golden Arms (ゴールデンアームズ, Gōruden Āmuzu). While transformed, they wield the Sword Bringer (ソードブリンガー, Sōdo Buringā) and the Apple Reflector (アップルリフレクター, Appuru Rifūrekutā) shield.

After appearing in the primary timeline, Kogane utilizes the Black Ringo (黒のリンゴ, Kuro no Ringo; Black Apple) Lockseed in conjunction with a new Sengoku Driver to transform into Kamen Rider Jam Darkness Arms (ダークネスアームズ, Dākunesu Āmuzu). While transformed, they wield the Musou Saber and the Dark Daidaimaru (ダーク大橙丸, Dāku Daidaimaru; Dark Great Orange Circle) sword, which can combine to access the latter's Naginata Mode.

Kogane is portrayed by Kataoka Ainosuke VI (六代目 片岡 愛之助, Rokudaime Kataoka Ainosuke) while the unnamed teenage girl is portrayed by Honoka Ando (安藤 穂乃果, Andō Honoka) and Kamen Rider Jam is voiced by Atsushi Ono (斧 アツシ, Ono Atsushi).

===== Locust Monster =====
The Locust Monster (イナゴ怪人, Inago Kaijin) is a monster created by Kogane, who used the power of the Golden Fruit to fuse a swarm of locusts together. It briefly appears during the series before Kota Kazuraba forces it to retreat. During the events of Kamen Rider Gaim: Great Soccer Battle! Golden Fruits Cup!, the Locust Monster attacks the Soccer World version of Kaito Kumon, who destroys the monster.

Another Locust Monster appears in the series finale, accompanying Kogane in their quest to seek revenge against the Armored Riders. It overpowers Hideyasu Jonouchi and Ryugen before Kota destroys it.

In battle, it has the ability to transform into a swarm of insects, which can infect people and turn them into mindless monsters or locate suitable hosts for Kogane.

==== Lapis ====
Lapis (ラピス, Rapisu), aka Shamubishe (シャムビシェ), (Note: Which translates into Japanese as "azure" (紺碧, konpeki).) is the Soccer World counterpart of Kota who similarly became an Overlord. He uses his special bracelet to escape to Earth before the Helheim Forest was taken over by the Forbidden Fruit, unaware that the bracelet contained an evil entity created by another Overlord that would go on to become Kogane. Lapis eventually grew tired of the bloodshed and fighting he experienced on Earth and, following a chance encounter with Kota Kazuraba, used his powers to create an alternate reality where people play soccer instead of fight.

After Kogane attempts to corrupt his world, Lapis helps Kota and the Armored Riders fight back before DJ Sagara gives him the means to become the samurai warlord-themed Kamen Rider Kamuro (仮面ライダー冠(カムロ), Kamen Raidā Kamuro) (Note: "Kamuro" comes from the kamuru (冠る, "to wear on one's head", "to crown", or "to bear the responsibility").) and help his friends defeat Kogane before disappearing.

Utilizing the Silver Ringo (銀のリンゴ, Gin no Ringo; Silver Apple) Lockseed in conjunction with the Sengoku Driver, Lapis can transform into Kamen Rider Kamuro Silver Arms (シルバーアームズ, Shirubā Āmuzu). While transformed, he wields the Souginjou (蒼銀杖, Sōginjō; Pale Silver Staff).

Lapis is portrayed by Taketo Tanaka (田中 偉登, Tanaka Taketo).

=== Megahex ===
Megahex (メガヘクス, Megahekusu) is a mechanical alien lifeform with the ability to assimilate worlds, having originally been his world's Man of the Beginning before using his wish to assimilate his entire world and become its core as Planet Megahex. From his perspective, individuality is a pointless concept and that absorbing others into his data system is beneficial. Coming across Kota Kazuraba and Mai Takatsukasa's planet, Megahex accessed the former's mind and learned of Earth's existence before seemingly destroying him and capturing Takatsukasa. Upon reaching Earth, Megahex creates facsimiles of Ryoma Sengoku and Kaito Kumon to serve him and assimilates the Cyberoid ZZZ android to become ZZZ Megahex (ZZZメガヘクス, Surī Zetto Megahekusu). However, the Kaito facsimile betrays him before ZZZ Megahex is weakened by Kota, the Armored Riders, Kamen Rider Drive, Mashin Chaser, Heart, and Brain before Kamen Riders Gaim and Drive travel to Planet Megahex and destroy the alien.

Megahex is voiced by Shin-ichiro Miki (三木 眞一郎, Miki Shin'ichirō).

=== Amagi Kureshima ===
Amagi Kureshima (呉島 天樹, Kureshima Amagi) is the patriarch of the Kureshima family with influence in the Yggdrasil Corporation and the father of Takatora and Mitsuzane who appears exclusively in the V-Cinema Gaim Gaiden: Kamen Rider Zangetsu. Years prior, he built a childcare facility for Zawame City's orphans, such as Tōka Akatsuki and Ryoma Sengoku, but secretly used the children to either conduct Helheim-related experiments on or select to work for Yggdrasil. In both cases, he made sure to teach them the concept of noblesse oblige, as his nobility was all that remained of his good nature. While Amagi was killed by a vengeful Akatsuki, his influence continued to linger in his sons, though Takatora was able to get out from his father's shadow.

Amagi Kureshima is portrayed by Minori Terada (寺田 農, Terada Minori).

=== Tōka Akatsuki ===
Tōka Akatsuki (朱月 藤果, Akatsuki Tōka) is a servant of the Kureshima family and one of Amagi Kureshima's guinea pigs, whom he used in Helheim Forest-related experiments, who appears exclusively in the V-Cinema Gaim Gaiden: Kamen Rider Zangetsu. She eventually kills Amagi and steals the Forbidden Ringo (禁断のリンゴ, Kindan no Ringo; Forbidden Apple) Lockseed to destroy the man's legacy as the European knight-themed Kamen Rider Idunn (仮面ライダーイドゥン, Kamen Raidā Idun) (Note: Iðunn is a Norse goddess associated with apples and youth.) After being confronted and defeated by Amagi's eldest son, Takatora Kureshima, she is secretly killed by Ryoma Sengoku, who takes the Forbidden Ringo Lockseed back.

Utilizing the Forbidden Ringo Lockseed in conjunction with the Sengoku Driver, Tōka can transform into Kamen Rider Idunn Ringo Arms (リンゴアームズ, Ringo Āmuzu; Apple Arms). While transformed, she wields the Sword Bringer and Apple Reflector.

Tōka Akatsuki is portrayed by Sayuri Iwata (岩田 さゆり, Iwata Sayuri). As a teenager, Tōka is portrayed by Ai Uchida (内田 愛, Uchida Ai).

=== Shapool ===
Shapool (シャプール, Shapūru) is the heir of a foreign country who physically resembles Kaito Kumon and first appears in the V-Cinema Gaim Gaiden: Kamen Rider Baron. He visits Zawame City as part of an inspection, but escapes from his strict butler, Alfred, to seek out freedom instead. Shapool later locates, sedates, and masquerades as Kaito until his identity is immediately revealed after he attempts to use Kaito's Sengoku Driver, which is genetically locked to him. Even in spite of what happened, Kaito warns Shapool that Alfred wants to kill him. Once Alfred finds him, the former reveals his desire to kill Shapool and take his family's fortune for himself. With Kaito's help, Shapool narrowly escapes, and the two compare their life experiences. When Alfred attacks Kaito's friends, Shapool attempts to take responsibility, but Kaito convinces him to stay back. Once Kaito defeats Alfred, Shapool writes a message for the former, thanking Kaito for inspiring him to become strong, and returns to his country to speak with his father.

In the tie-in novel Novel: Kamen Rider Gaim, Shapool takes over his adopted father's foundation after the latter was arrested for supplying the Black Linden cult with Sengoku Drivers, forcing the young man to work feverishly to get the organization back on the right track.

Shapool is portrayed by Yutaka Kobayashi, who also portrays Kaito Kumon.

=== Alfred ===
Alfred (アルフレッド, Arufureddo) is Shapool's family's strict butler who appears exclusively in the V-Cinema Gaim Gaiden: Kamen Rider Baron. He secretly plans to murder his employers and take their fortune for himself, but when Kaito Kumon interferes with his plans, the butler receives help from Ryoma Sengoku, who gives him the means to become the European knight-themed Kamen Rider Tyrant (仮面ライダータイラント, Kamen Raidā Tairanto). Unbeknownst to Alfred however, Ryoma was secretly using him to test the Dragon Fruits Energy Lockseed, which gradually turns the butler into the ox-themed Overlord Tyrant (タイラント, Tairanto) where he wields the Tyrant Blade (タイラントブレード, Tairanto Burēdo) sword. After going on a rampage, Alfred is destroyed by Kamen Rider Baron.

Utilizing a prototype Dragon Fruit Energy Lockseed in conjunction with the Genesis Driver, Alfred can transform into Kamen Rider Tyrant Dragon Energy Arms. While transformed, he wields the Sonic Arrow.

Alfred is portrayed by Gamon Kaai (河相 我聞, Kaai Gamon).

=== Kugai Kudo ===
Kugai Kudo (狗道 供界, Kudō Kugai) is a former researcher for the Yggdrasil Corporation and a colleague of Ryoma Sengoku until he was killed while testing the Ringo Lockseed. Kudo was trapped in a state of limbo until he received the Zakuro (ザクロ; Pomegranate) Lockseed from DJ Sagara and uses his newfound abilities as the samurai/European knight-themed Kamen Rider Saver (仮面ライダーセイヴァー, Kamen Raidā Seivā) to establish the Black Linden (黒の菩提樹, Kuro no Bodaiju) cult and lead them as their messiah claimant while using his brainwashed followers as expendable suicide bombers. In the V-Cinema Gaim Gaiden: Kamen Rider Duke, Kudo initially haunts Ryoma and menaces the Yggdrasil Corporation until the latter stops him as Kamen Rider Duke. Although it seemed that Kudo disappeared due to his Sengoku Driver being destroyed, he is able to manipulate his followers into recreating the belt and make his move during the events of the V-Cinema Kamen Rider Knuckle and the tie-in novel Novel: Kamen Rider Gaim, expanding the Black Linden cult outside of Japan by collaborating with Yggdrasil's remnants and Shura's Neo Baron team. Following Shura's death, Kudo instigates chaos in Zawame by creating Bodhi Tree-like roots that turn its citizens into mindless slaves before converting them into Overlord Inves. After failing to imprison the Armored Riders in a mental prison, Kudo uses his newly created Ringo Lockseeds to gain an advantage before the Armored Riders counter it with their new forms. Once Kota shatters his realm and frees the Armored Riders, the weakened Kudo finally dies as he is freed from his limbo.

Utilizing the Zakuro and Blood Orange Lockseeds in conjunction with the Sengoku Driver and Genesis Core Unit respectively, Kudo can transform into Kamen Rider Saver Blood Zakuro Arms (ブラッドザクロアームズ, Buraddo Zakuro Āmuzu). While transformed, he wields the Blood Daidaimaru and the bladed Saver Arrow (セイヴァーアロー, Seivā Arō) bow.

In the tie-in novel Novel: Kamen Rider Gaim, Kudo gains access to Golden Arms, Darkness Arms, and Maja Arms (魔蛇アームズ, Mājā Āmuzu). In addition, he can also assume monstrous forms, such as Lotus Position False God Saver (蓮華座偽神セイヴァー, Renge-za Gishin Seivā), a giant snake monster, and a Skeletal Dinosaur (骸骨恐竜, Gaikotsu Kyōryū).

Kugai Kudo is portrayed by Jun Toba (鳥羽 潤, Toba Jun).

=== Azami ===
Azami (アザミ) is Peko's sister and friend of Team Baron.

Azami is portrayed by Maari (麻亜里).

=== Shura ===
Shura (シュラ) is a former member of Team Baron who was ousted by Kaito Kumon prior to the series following a failed attempt to kill Kaito and take over leadership of Team Baron. During the events of Gaim Gaiden: Kamen Rider Knuckle, Shura forms the criminal group, Neo Baron (ネオ・バロン), and returns as Kamen Rider Black Baron (仮面ライダーブラックバロン, Kamen Raidā Burakku Baron) to take revenge on his former team.

Utilizing the Banana Lockseed in conjunction with a mass-produced Sengoku Driver, Shura can transform into Kamen Rider Black Baron Banana Arms. While transformed, he wields the Bana Spear.

Shura is portrayed by Ryusuke Nakamura (中村 龍介, Nakamura Ryūsuke).

=== Torkia Republic ===
The Torkia Republic (トルキア共和国, Torukia Kyōwakoku) is a fictional country that appears in the stage show Kamen Rider Zangetsu: Gaim Gaiden and its novelization Novel: Kamen Rider Gaim Gaiden: Kamen Rider Zangetsu. After its branch of the Yggdrasill Corporation activated the Scalar System, the Torkia Republic was destroyed and reduced to an underground city in which its low-ranking citizens were forced to fight against one another to survive while its noble residents live on the surface and benefit from the conflict as a form of entertainment. With the exception of the Shizumiya family, most citizens of the Torkia Republic's underground ruins are named after the 72 demons listed in the Ars Goetia.

The Torkia Republic's Armored Riders use prototype versions of Sengoku Drivers that allow them to assume black-colored versions of their Zawame City counterparts. However, due to its incomplete system, it also slowly transforms them into Category H Inves.

- Orange Ride (オレンジ・ライド, Orenji Raido): A faction that resembles Team Gaim and is led by Aym, who took over after the previous leader, Simon, went missing. At the start of the story, members of Orange Ride are reduced to three people after most of its members were killed.
  - Simon (サイモン, Saimon): The former leader of Team Orange Ride who went missing prior to the story. In the novelization, Simon suffers a similar fate as Yuya Sumii after obtaining a Sengoku Driver and was intended to become Proto Gaim, but ended up mutating into an Inves and was forced to be killed to put him out of his misery.
  - Aym (アイム, Aimu): The current leader of Orange Ride who shares Kota Kazuraba's idealism, but is willing to sacrifice others to save lives. Aym transforms into Kamen Rider Proto Gaim (仮面ライダープロト鎧武, Kamen Raidā Puroto Gaimu) to fight Glasya, but eventually becomes possessed by Kota's spirit to deliver the Kachidoki Lockseed to Takatora. Aym is portrayed by Keigo Hagiya (萩谷 慧悟, Hagiya Keigo).
  - Paimon (パイモン): A hot-blooded member who wields an iron pipe. Paimon is portrayed by Dai Goto (後藤 大, Gotō Dai).
  - Gusion (グシオン, Gushion): A quiet member of the team. Gusion is portrayed by Keito Takahashi (高橋 奎仁, Takahashi Keito).
- Baroque Red (バロック・レッド, Barokku Reddo): A team that resembles Team Baron, acts independently, and refuses to cooperate with outside forces regardless of their strengths.
  - Glasya (グラシャ, Gurasha): The cold leader of Baroque Red who shares Kaito Kumon's philosophy, respected and acknowledged Simon's strength, and hopes to overthrow the Torkia Republic's nobles from power. Glasya transforms into Kamen Rider Proto Baron (仮面ライダープロトバロン, Kamen Raidā Puroto Baron) to fight rival teams. After Foras' death, Glasya is defeated by Aym when their philosophies clash, acknowledging his rival's strength with his final breath. In the novelization, Glasya is revealed to have been a child from an impoverished family whose parents sold themselves to Yggdrasill as their test subjects before being turned into Inves and killed afterwards. Glasya's discovery of what happened shaped his mentality and desire to seek power and led to him accepting the prototype Sengoku Driver in spite of it slowly transforming him into an Inves. Glasya is portrayed by Atsuki Mashiko (増子 敦貴, Mashiko Atsuki).
  - Berith (ベリト, Berito): A warlike member who respects Glasya. Berith is portrayed by Kyohei Chida (千田 京平, Chida Kyōhei).
  - Ose (オセ): A cool-headed member of Baroque Red. Ose is portrayed by Rui Tabuchi (田淵 累生, Tabuchi Rui).
- Green Dolls (グリーン・ドールズ, Gurīn Dōruzu): A team that resembles Teams Invitto and Raid Wild.
  - Foras (フォラス, Forasu): The leader of the Green Dolls who resembles Ryoji Hase and Hideyasu Jonouchi and can transform into Kamen Rider Proto Gridon (仮面ライダープロトグリドン, Kamen Raidā Puroto Guridon). After he is overthrown by Yukimura as the Green Dolls' leader, Foras slowly transforms into an Inves due to his Sengoku Driver's side effects and is given a mercy kill by Aym to stop his rampage. While details of Foras' background goes unstated in the stage show, the novelization portrays him as being respected by his teammates due to his kindness. Foras is portrayed by Yuya Uno (宇野 結也, Uno Yūya).
  - Yukimura Belial Grunstein (雪叢・ベリアル・グランスタイン, Yukimura Beriaru Guransutain): A mercenary who overthrows Foras as the Green Dolls' leader. Displaying similar mannerisms as Oren Pierre Alfonzo, Yukimura transforms into Kamen Rider Proto Bravo (仮面ライダープロトブラーボ, Kamen Raidā Puroto Burābo) using equipment given to him by Kagiomi and is assigned to assassinate Takatora. After seeing Foras' mutation into an Inves, Yukimura cancels his contract with Kagiomi and allies himself with Takatora, rallying his men in fighting against Kagiomi's forces as Takatora marches his way to Masahito during the final battle. Yukimura Belial Grunstein is portrayed by Shota Onuma (小沼 将太, Onuma Shōta).
- Shizumiya family: A family of nobles.
  - Masahito Shizumiya (鎮宮 雅仁, Shizumiya Masahito): The main antagonist of the stage show Kamen Rider Zangetsu: Gaim Gaiden and the eldest son of the Shizumiya family. He was originally a good friend of Takatora who has a stable relationship with his family members and shares the Kureshima family's views on noblesse oblige. The Torkia Republic's population's gradual transformation into Inves leads to Masahito activating the Scalar System and seemingly dying from the explosion that destroyed their nation. In reality, he survived and mutated into an Overlord Inves form that resembles Redyue. During Takatora's visit to Torkia's ruins, Masahito ambushes his former friend, renders him amnesiac, and steals the equipment necessary to transform into Zangetsu. Seeking to lead mankind after deeming them incapable of correcting their own mistakes, Masahito hunts Takatora to prove their similarities and attacks Kagemasa. However, Takatora uses the Kachidoki Lockseed he received from Kota to defeat Masahito, who allows the former to kill him upon realizing his mistake so he can atone for his mistakes. Masahito Shizumiya is portrayed by Haruki Kiyama (丘山 晴己, Kiyama Haruki).
  - Kagemasa Shizumiya (鎮宮 影正, Shizumiya Kagemasa): The youngest son of the Shizumiya family who resembles Mitsuzane, is an old friend of Aym, and transforms into Kamen Rider Proto Ryugen (仮面ライダープロト龍玄, Kamen Raidā Puroto Ryūgen). Using his likeness with his counterpart, Kagemasa helps the amnesiac Takatora recover his memories in the hopes of killing him at his most vulnerable and avenging the seemingly deceased Masahito as Kagemasa blames Takatora for profiting off of what happened to the Torkia Republic and being hailed as a hero in Zawame. Upon discovering Masahito is alive and being attacked by him, Kagemasa gives Takatora his prototype Sengoku Driver so the latter can stop Masahito's reign of terror. While Kagemasa apparently dies in the stage show, it is revealed in the novelization that Aym saved him at the last minute. Kagemasa Shizumiya is portrayed by Motohisa Harashima (原嶋 元久, Harashima Motohisa).
  - Kagiomi Shizumiya (鎮宮 鍵臣, Shizumiya Kagiomi): The patriarch of the Shizumiya family, a member of the Yggdrasil Corporation, and one of the Torkia Republic's nobles who engineered the war between Torkia's survivors for his own entertainment. After the failure of Project Ark weakens their connection with the Kureshima family, Kagiomi aims to take over the Yggdrasill Corporation for his own until he is killed by Masahito. While the stage show portrays him as a comical man, the novelization portrays him as a ruthless man who abuses his own children. Kagiomi Shizumiya is portrayed by Hiroo Ohtaka (大高 洋夫, Ōtaka Hiroo).

=== Masako Suzuka ===
Masako Suzuka (鈴鹿 まさこ, Suzuka Masako) is Hideyasu Jonouchi's secretary, whom he hired sometime after succeeding Alfonso Pierre Oren as a pâtissier, who can transform into the Arabian soldier-themed Kamen Rider Sylphi (仮面ライダーシルフィー, Kamen Raidā Shirufī) and appears exclusively in the web special Gaim Gaiden: Kamen Rider Gridon vs. Kamen Rider Bravo. Using the power of Helheim, she manipulates the former into unknowingly using deadly Helheim fruit in his new fruit cakes to transform customers into Inves and brainwash Oren into her mindless slave. However, her crimes are discovered by Takatora Kureshima, who defeats her and foils her plans while Jonouchi frees Oren from her control.

Utilizing the Helheim (ヘルヘイム, Heruheimu) Lockseed in conjunction with the Sengoku Driver, Masako can transform into Kamen Rider Sylphi Hells Arms (ヘルズアームズ, Heruzu Āmuzu). While transformed, she wields the Hells Cane (ヘルズケイン, Heruzu Kein) spear.

Masako Suzuka is portrayed by Tomomi Jiena Sumi (鷲見 友美 ジェナ, Sumi Tomomi Jena).
