= List of Kamen Rider Zi-O characters =

The main heroes of Kamen Rider Zi-O. From left to right: Woz, Geiz Myokoin, Sougo Tokiwa, and Tsukuyomi.

Kamen Rider Zi-O (仮面ライダージオウ, Kamen Raidā Jiō) is a Japanese tokusatsu series that serves as the 29th installment in the Kamen Rider franchise, and the 20th and final entry in the Heisei era. It follows the exploits of Sougo Tokiwa, a young man who, according to visitors from the future, is destined to become the king who will enslave the entire world, and embarks on a quest to change his fate, meeting several other Kamen Riders from the Heisei era along the way.

== Main characters ==
=== Sougo Tokiwa ===
Sougo Tokiwa (常磐 ソウゴ, Tokiwa Sōgo) (Note: "Sougo" is alternatively spelt "Sogo". Additionally, he is named after Tokiwa-sō, the former apartment of Shotaro Ishinomori.) is an 18-year old student, later 19-year old graduate, of Hikarigamori High School (光ヶ森高等学校, Hikarigamori Kōtō Gakkō) who dreamed of becoming a king after experiencing a series of nightmares in his childhood and being visited by a mysterious figure who entrusted him with the prophecy. After surviving a bus accident when he was nine, Sougo became orphaned and since then lived with his great-uncle at 9-to-5. After meeting Tsukuyomi and Geiz, Sougo learns he will become Ohma Zi-O, a tyrant destined to rule the world with an iron fist. Despite being troubled by this possibility, Sougo chooses to continue following his dream while changing his fate, accepting the power to become the analog watch-themed Kamen Rider Zi-O and declaring that he will become a benevolent tyrant instead. Despite Geiz and Tsukuyomi's reservations, Sougo considers them friends and trusts them with his life, asking both of them to kill him should he follow the path to becoming Ohma Zi-O. All the while, Sougo's predecessor Tsukasa Kadoya secretly watches over him to ensure he succeeds in changing his fate.

Originally a visionary high school student prior to his graduation, Sougo develops other strengths along his journey. Due to his observant nature and keen understanding of human behavior, he became a skilled manipulator capable of outsmarting a genius of Kuroto Dan's caliber. In 2019, Sougo develops the ability to subconsciously create alternate futures, which he initially assumed were prophetic dreams of Kamen Riders from White Woz's timeline. Ever since the bus accident, he also gained chronokinesis like the Time Jackers. However, their leader Swartz erased Sougo's memory of it before the latter regains his powers after he becomes Grand Zi-O.

As Swartz commences a convergence of the A.R. Worlds, Tsukuyomi seemingly betrays Sougo and Geiz is killed saving him. In response, an enraged Sougo becomes Kamen Rider Ohma Zi-O to defeat Swartz himself before sacrificing his newfound power to reset the timeline, negating his destiny and undoing Swartz's damage. Due to this, he relives his senior year in 2018 with altered versions of Geiz, Tsukuyomi, and the Time Jackers as his classmates in the new timeline.

In the sequel special Kamen Rider Zi-O Next Time: Geiz, Majesty, Sougo regains his Rider powers while helping Geiz in his fight against a new White Woz, who became Another Diend to become a savior.

In an alternate timeline depicted in the film Kamen Rider Zi-O the Movie: Over Quartzer, Sougo and his friends help Go Shijima preserve Kamen Rider Drive's history after Oda Nobunaga lost the Battle of Nagashino. Despite succeeding, Black Woz betrays him, taking all of Sougo's Ride Watches (ライドウォッチ, Raido Wotchi) and imprisoning him on behalf of the Quartzers. Despite this, Sougo is released by Tsukuyomi and Go and receives the Ohma Zi-O Ride Watch to defeat the Quartzers' leader, an adult version of himself from an alternate timeline. After Sougo defeats his evil counterpart, he is recognized as a king.

In the web specials Rider Time: Kamen Rider Decade vs. Zi-O: The Decade House Death Game and Rider Time: Kamen Rider Zi-O vs. Decade: 7 of Zi-Os!, an alternate universe version of Sougo who became a basketball player becomes trapped in the titular House Death Game where he encounters Tsukasa, who was trying to lure the "prime" version of Sougo to the game. The alternative Sougo gives Tsukasa the Saber Ride Watch and asks him to give it to the "prime" Sougo, who is later forced to fight various alternate universe versions of himself.

Utilizing the Zi-O (ジオウ, Jiō) Ride Watch in conjunction with the Ziku-Driver (ジクウドライバー, Jikū Doraibā; Spacetime Driver) belt, Sougo can transform into Kamen Rider Zi-O. While transformed, he can perform the Time Break (タイムブレーク, Taimu Burēku) finisher. He also wields the Zikan Girade (ジカンギレード, Jikan Girēdo), which has a Ken Mode (ケンモード, Ken Mōdo; Sword Mode) for performing the Edge of Time Slash (ギリギリスラッシュ, Giri Giri Surasshu) finisher and a Zyu Mode (ジュウモード, Jū Mōdo; Gun Mode) for performing the Sure Sure Shooting (スレスレシューティング, Sure Sure Shūtingu) finisher. His personal vehicles are the Ride Striker (ライドストライカー, Raido Sutoraikā) motorcycle, which is summoned from the Bike (バイク, Baiku) Ride Watch, and the Time Mazine (タイムマジーン, Taimu Majīn) mecha, which can switch between its flying Vehicle Mode (ビークルモード, Bīkuru Mōdo) and its humanoid Battle Mode (バトルモード, Batoru Mōdo). Additionally, he possesses other Ride Watches that allow him to assume forms based on his 19 Heisei Kamen Rider predecessors called Rider Armors (ライダーアーマー, Raidā Āmā), which are as follows:

- Build Armor (ビルドアーマー, Birudo Āmā): An auxiliary form accessed from the Build (ビルド, Birudo) Ride Watch that grants increased leg strength. In this form, Sougo wields the Drill Crusher Crusher (ドリルクラッシャークラッシャー, Doriru Kurasshā Kurasshā) tekkō, based on Kamen Rider Build's Drill Crusher. His finisher in this form is the Vortex Time Break (ボルテックタイムブレーク, Borutekku Taimu Burēku). This form first appears in the film Kamen Rider Build the Movie: Be the One.
- Ex-Aid Armor (エグゼイドアーマー, Eguzeido Āmā): An auxiliary form accessed from the Ex-Aid (エグゼイド, Eguzeido) Ride Watch that grants the ability to generate a Game Area (ゲームエリア, Gēmu Eria) digital field with chocolate block-like platforms. In this form, Sougo is equipped with a pair of Gashacon Breaker Breaker (ガシャコンブレイカーブレイカー, Gashakon Bureikā Bureikā) gauntlets, based on Kamen Rider Ex-Aid's Gashacon Breaker. His finisher in this form is the Critical Time Break (クリティカルタイムブレーク, Kuritikaru Taimu Burēku).
- Fourze Armor (フォーゼアーマー, Fōze Āmā): An auxiliary form accessed from the Fourze (フォーゼ, Fōze) Ride Watch that grants the use of the Rocket Mode (ロケットモード, Roketto Mōdo) ability to transform into an aircraft-like state. In this form, Sougo is equipped with a pair of self-propelling Booster Module (ブースターモジュール, Būsutā Mojūru) gauntlets, based on Kamen Rider Fourze's Rocket Module. His finisher in this form is the Limit Time Break (リミットタイムブレーク, Rimitto Taimu Burēku).
- OOO Armor (オーズアーマー, Ōzu Āmā): An auxiliary form accessed from the OOO (オーズ, Ōzu) Ride Watch that grants superhuman jumping and senses. In this form, Sougo is equipped with the right forearm-mounted Tora Claw Z (トラクローZ, Tora Kurō Zetto; Tiger Claw Z), based on Kamen Rider OOO's Tora Claws. His finisher in this form is the Scanning Time Break (スキャニングタイムブレーク, Sukyaningu Taimu Burēku).
- Gaim Armor (鎧武アーマー, Gaimu Āmā): An auxiliary form accessed from the Gaim (鎧武, Gaimu) Ride Watch that grants the ability to open portals. In this form, Sougo carries six Daidaimaru Z (大橙丸Z, Daidaimaru Zetto; Great Orange Circle Z) swords, based on Kamen Rider Gaim's Daidaimaru, to dual wield in three pairs. His finisher in this form is the Squash Time Break (スカッシュタイムブレーク, Sukasshu Taimu Burēku).
- Ghost Armor: An auxiliary form accessed from the Ghost Ride Watch that grants similar capabilities as Geiz's version. Sougo's finisher in this form is the Omega Time Break (オメガタイムブレーク, Omega Taimu Burēku).
- Decade Armor (ディケイドアーマー, Dikeido Āmā): An upgrade form accessed from the Decade (ディケイド, Dikeido) Ride Watch that can be augmented with one of Sougo's predecessors' power-up forms by combining the Decade Ride Watch with their corresponding Ride Watch. In this form, he wields the wristwatch-like Ride Heisaber (ライドヘイセイバー, Raido Heiseibā), which allows him to perform varying Dual Time Break (デュアルタイムブレーク, Dyuaru Taimu Burēku) attacks based on the powers of his predecessors. His finishers in this form are the (Final) Attack Time Break ((ファイナル) アタックタイムブレーク, (Fainaru) Atakku Taimu Burēku) via the Ziku-Driver and the Scramble Time Break (スクランブルタイムブレーク, Sukuranburu Taimu Burēku) and Ultimate Time Break (アルティメットタイムブレーク, Arutimetto Taimu Burēku) via the Ride Heisaber.
  - Decade Armor Build Form (ディケイドアーマービルドフォーム, Dikeido Āmā Birudo Fōmu): An enhanced version of Decade Armor accessed from the Decade and Build Ride Watches that augments Sougo with Kamen Rider Build's Rabbit Tank Sparkling Form, which grants the use of the Drill Crusher Crusher to dual wield alongside the Ride Heisaber.
  - Decade Armor Ghost Form (ディケイドアーマーゴーストフォーム, Dikeido Āmā Gōsuto Fōmu): An enhanced version of Decade Armor accessed from the Decade and Ghost Ride Watches that augments Sougo with Kamen Rider Ghost's Grateful Damashii, which grants the combined powers of all 15 heroic Eyecons.
  - Decade Armor Ex-Aid Form (ディケイドアーマーエグゼイドフォーム, Dikeido Āmā Eguzeido Fōmu): An enhanced version of Decade Armor accessed from the Decade and Ex-Aid Ride Watches that augments Sougo with Kamen Rider Ex-Aid's Double Action Gamer Level XX, which splits him into the azure-colored Decade Armor Ex-Aid Form L and the orange-colored Decade Armor Ex-Aid Form R.
  - Decade Armor OOO Form (ディケイドアーマーオーズフォーム, Dikeido Āmā Ōzu Fōmu): An enhanced version of Decade Armor accessed from the Decade and OOO Ride Watches that augments Sougo with Kamen Rider OOO's Tajadol Combo, which grants flight capabilities.
  - Decade Armor Ryuki Form (ディケイドアーマー龍騎フォーム, Dikeido Āmā Ryūki Fōmu): An enhanced version of Decade Armor accessed from the Decade and Ryuki (龍騎, Ryūki) Ride Watches that augments Sougo with Kamen Rider Ryuki Survive, which grants the use of the Drag Visor Zwei to dual wield alongside the Ride Heisaber. This form appears exclusively in the web series spin-off Rider Time: Kamen Rider Ryuki.
  - Decade Armor Saber Form (ディケイドアーマーセイバーフォーム, Dikeido Āmā Seibā Fōmu): An enhanced version of Decade Armor accessed from the Decade and Saber (セイバー, Seibā) Ride Watches that augments Sougo with Kamen Rider Saber, which grants pyrokinesis. This form appears exclusively in the web series spin-off Rider Time: Kamen Rider Zi-O vs. Decade: 7 of Zi-Os!.
- W Armor (ダブルアーマー, Daburu Āmā): An auxiliary form accessed from the W (ダブル, Daburu) Ride Watch that grants aerokinesis and the use of two Memory Droid (メモリドロイド, Memori Doroido) units, based on Kamen Rider W's Cyclone and Joker Memories, for combat assistance. Sougo's finisher in this form is the Maximum Time Break (マキシマムタイムブレーク, Makushimamu Taimu Burēku). This form first appears in the crossover film Kamen Rider Heisei Generations Forever.
- Kuuga Armor (クウガアーマー, Kūga Āmā): An auxiliary form accessed from the Kuuga (クウガ, Kūga) Ride Watch that grants superhuman agility. Sougo's finisher in this form is the Mighty Time Break (マイティタイムブレーク, Maiti Taimu Burēku). This form first appears in the crossover film Kamen Rider Heisei Generations Forever.

Amidst his journey, Sougo acquires unique Ride Watches that allow him to achieve the following power-up forms:

- Kamen Rider Zi-O II (仮面ライダージオウII, Kamen Raidā Jiō Tsū): Sougo's super form accessed from the two-in-one Zi-O Ride Watch II (ジオウライドウォッチII, Jiō Raido Wotchi Tsū) that grants the ability to see seconds into the future. While transformed, he wields the Saikyo Girade (サイキョーギレード, Saikyō Girēdo) sword, which allows him to perform the Rider Slash (ライダー斬り, Raidā Giri) and Supreme King Slash (覇王斬り, Haō Giri) attacks. He can also combine the Saikyo Girade and Zikan Girade to form the Saikyo Zikan Girade (サイキョージカンギレード, Saikyō Jikan Girēdo) broadsword. His finishers in this form are the Twice Time Break (トゥワイスタイムブレーク, Tuwaisu Taimu Burēku) via the Ziku-Driver and the King Edge of Time Slash (キングギリギリスラッシュ, Kingu Giri Giri Surasshu) via the Saikyo Zikan Girade.
- Kamen Rider Zi-O Trinity (仮面ライダージオウトリニティ, Kamen Raidā Jiō Toriniti): A fusion form between Kamen Riders Zi-O, Geiz, and Woz accessed from the Zi-O Trinity (ジオウトリニティ, Jiō Toriniti) Ride Watch that allows the trio to use all of their powers and weapons at once. Their finisher in this form is the Trinity Time Break Burst Explosion (トリニティタイムブレークバーストエクスプロージョン, Toriniti Taimu Burēku Bāsuto Ekusupurōjon).
  - Zi-O Trinity Version Geiz & Tsukuyomi (ジオウトリニティバージョン・ゲイツ&ツクヨミ, Jiō Toriniti Bājon Geitsu Ando Tsukuyomi): A variant of Kamen Rider Zi-O Trinity that replaces Woz with Tsukuyomi. This form appears exclusively in the tie-in novel Novel: Kamen Rider Zi-O.
- Kamen Rider Grand Zi-O (仮面ライダーグランドジオウ, Kamen Raidā Gurando Jiō): Sougo's final form accessed from the Grand Zi-O (グランドジオウ, Gurando Jiō) Ride Watch that grants chronokinesis and the ability to either summon any of his predecessors from their active timeline to fight by his side or use their weapons along with his own. His finisher in this form is the All Twenty Time Break (オールトゥエンティタイムブレーク, Ōru Tuenti Taimu Burēku).
- Ohma Form (オーマフォーム, Ōma Fōmu): A fusion form between Kamen Riders Zi-O and Ohma Zi-O accessed from the latter's personal Ride Watch that allows the former to use half of his future self's powers. Sougo's finisher in this form is the King Time Break (キングタイムブレーク, Kingu Taimu Burēiku). This form appears exclusively in the film Kamen Rider Zi-O the Movie: Over Quartzer.

During the final battle, Souga's Ziku-Driver evolves into the Ohma Zi-O Driver, allowing him to transform into Kamen Rider Ohma Zi-O. While transformed, he gains the power to destroy enemies with a single attack. His finisher is the Ohma Zi-O Hissatsugeki (逢魔時王必殺撃, Ōma Jiō Hissatsugeki; Ohma Zi-O Finishing Attack).

Sougo Tokiwa is portrayed by So Okuno (奥野 壮, Okuno Sō) while Rui Takahashi (高橋 琉晟, Takahashi Rui) and Haru Takagi (高木 波瑠, Takagi Haru) portray him as a child and younger child, respectively.

==== Mirror Sougo Tokiwa ====
The Mirror Sougo Tokiwa (鏡像の常磐ソウゴ, Kyōzō no Tokiwa Sōgo) is a cynical and power-hungry version of the original Sougo from the Mirror World. Meeting his real world counterpart during the events of Another Ryuga's reign of terror, Mirror Sougo torments his counterpart over his perceived futile attempt at defying his fate as Ohma Zi-O. When Sougo reaffirms his belief and acknowledges his darker self, the Mirror Sougo concedes and gives the former half of the Zi-O Ride Watch II. Like his real life counterpart, the Mirror Sougo can also transform into Zi-O, with his suit being a mirrored copy of the original.

In the tie-in novel Novel: Kamen Rider Zi-O, another version of Mirror Sougo is brought into existence when the Third Woz interferes with the timeline. This Mirror Sougo fuses with his real world counterpart to become Inner Sougo Tokiwa (裏の常磐ソウゴ, Ura no Tokiwa Sōgo) and collect most of the Another Watches to become Another Ohma Zi-O. He later joins forces with Third Woz to obtain the Decade Ride Watch and manipulate the original timeline so that Sougo never meets Geiz and Tsukuyomi and ensure he becomes Ohma Zi-O. After absorbing Geiz and Tsukuyomi's Another Watches to become Another Ohma Zi-O Trinity, Inner Sougo is defeated by Zi-O Trinity Geiz & Tsukuyomi Ver.

Mirror Sougo Tokiwa is portrayed by So Okuno, who also portrays the real world version of Sougo Tokiwa.

==== Alternate Sougo Tokiwas ====
In the Rider Time web series Decade VS Zi-O and Zi-O VS Decade, several alternate timeline iterations of Sougo Tokiwa are introduced as supporting characters, each of whom retain the ability to transform into Zi-O. Excluding the android Sougo, the rest of the alternate Sougos are addressed alphabetically, with the "prime" Sougo designated as "A". Most of the alternative versions are hunted down and killed by Tsukasa in order to prevent the merging of alternate universes caused by the True Sougo.

- Android: The android Sougo Tokiwa is a basketball player who hails from a dimension where humanity has been wiped out and replaced by robots. In Decade VS Zi-O, the android Sougo is one of the many participants in True Sougo's "King's Death Game" and bonds with the ghost of Misa Kuon. He later joins Tsukasa's party of Kamen Riders in fighting True Sougo. However, as he is incapable of harnessing a fellow Rider's Ride Watch, he hands Tsukasa the Saber Ride Watch in the hopes that someone else can use it.
- Sougo B: A class president from Hanazono Academy (花園学園, Hanazono Gakuen) and the boyfriend of his world's Misa Kuon. After surviving the King's Death Game, Sougo B returns to his universe on good terms with Sougo A.
- Sougo C: A manipulative Misawa High School (三沢高校, Misawa Kōkō) student who used bribery to win his school's presidency and conspires with Misa to kill Sougo A. However, he swaps places with Sougo A and is killed by Decade.
- Sougo D: A yankī who was killed by Tsukasa.
- Sougo E: A childish student who was killed by Ohma Zi-O.
- Sougo F: A cowardly student who was killed by Decade.

As with the original Sougo Tokiwa, the alternate Sougos are portrayed by So Okuno.

=== Geiz Myokoin ===
Geiz Myokoin (明光院 ゲイツ, Myōkōin Geitsu) is an 18-year old soldier from the year 2068 who joined the resistance against Ohma Zi-O as the digital watch-themed Kamen Rider Geiz (仮面ライダーゲイツ, Kamen Raidā Geitsu). While he travels back in time to kill Sougo before he can become Ohma Zi-O, Geiz momentarily relents after Sougo saves him while fighting the Another Rider, Another Build. At Tsukuyomi's request, Geiz agrees to stay his hand and watch events play out, becoming an on-again-off-again house guest of Sougo's. Over the course of the series, Geiz struggles with his desire to stop Ohma Zi-O and his growing friendship with Sougo before Geiz eventually becomes more open about his feelings and accepts Sougo as his friend following Another Zi-O's attacks.

After defeating Another Zi-O II, Geiz discovers the future he came from is actually an alternate dimension where Ohma Zi-O continues to exist despite Sougo's efforts to avoid becoming him. During the final battle, Geiz dies protecting Sougo and begs him to become Ohma Zi-O to defeat Swartz with his dying breath. After Sougo defeats the Time Jacker leader and resets the timeline, Geiz is revived as Keito Myokoin (明光院 景都, Myōkōin Keito), a contemporary classmate of Sougo's who is nicknamed "Geiz".

In the sequel special Kamen Rider Zi-O Next Time: Geiz, Majesty, Geiz is visited by a new iteration of White Woz, who restores his Rider powers. After meeting several past secondary Riders and seeing White Woz become the monstrous Another Diend to endanger Sougo, Geiz receives the Geiz Majesty Ride Watch from Daiki Kaito and defeats White Woz. Afterwards, Geiz permanently regains his original timeline memories and returns to his regular life.

Utilizing the Geiz (ゲイツ, Geitsu) Ride Watch in conjunction with the Ziku-Driver, Geiz can transform into Kamen Rider Geiz. While transformed, he can perform the Time Burst (タイムバースト, Taimu Bāsuto) finisher. He also wields the Zikan Zax (ジカンザックス, Jikan Zakkusu), which has a Yumi Mode (ゆみモード, Yumi Mōdo; Bow Mode) for performing the Kiwa Kiwa Shoot (キワキワシュート, Kiwa Kiwa Shūto) finisher and an Ono Mode (おのモード, Ono Mōdo; Axe Mode) for performing the Zakkuri Cutting (ザックリカッティング, Zakkuri Kattingu) finisher. His personal vehicles are the Ride Striker and Time Mazine. Moreover, he possesses his own series of Ride Watches, which allow him to assume the following Rider Armors:

- Ghost Armor (ゴーストアーマー, Gōsuto Āmā): An auxiliary form accessed from the Ghost (ゴースト, Gōsuto) Ride Watch that grants levitation capabilities, invisibility, intangibility, and the use of Kamen Rider Ghost's personal Hoodie Ghosts for combat assistance. Geiz's finisher in this form is the Omega Time Burst (オメガタイムバースト, Omega Taimu Bāsuto).
- Drive Armor (ドライブアーマー, Doraibu Āmā): An auxiliary form accessed from the Drive (ドライブ, Doraibu) Ride Watch that grants superhuman speed and the use of the twin Shift Speed Speed (シフトスピードスピード, Shifuto Supīdo Supīdo) drones, based on Kamen Rider Drive's Shift Speed Car, for combat assistance. Geiz's finisher in this form is the Hissatsu Time Burst (ヒッサツタイムバースト, Hissatsu Taimu Bāsuto; Finisher Time Burst).
- Build Armor: An auxiliary form accessed from the Build Ride Watch that grants similar capabilities as Sougo's version. Geiz's finisher in this form is the Vortex Time Burst (ボルテックタイムバースト, Borutekku Taimu Bāsuto).
- Faiz Armor (ファイズアーマー, Faizu Āmā): An auxiliary form accessed from the Faiz (ファイズ, Faizu) Ride Watch that grants the ability to summon the Faiz Shot Shot (ファイズショットショット, Faizu Shotto Shotto) knuckleduster and/or the right shin-mounted Faiz Pointer Pointer (ファイズポインターポインター, Faizu Pointā Pointā) laser pen via the Faiz Phone X (ファイズフォンX(テン), Faizu Fon Ten; Faiz Phone Ten) device, based on Kamen Rider Faiz's Faiz Shot, Pointer, and Phone respectively. Geiz's finisher in this form is the Exceed Time Burst (エクシードタイムバースト, Ekushīdo Taimu Bāsuto).
- Wizard Armor (ウィザードアーマー, Wizādo Āmā): An auxiliary form accessed from the Wizard (ウィザード, Wizādo) Ride Watch that grants the ability to cast spells based on Kamen Rider Wizard's Wizard Rings. Geiz's finisher in this form is the Strike Time Burst (ストライクタイムバースト, Sutoraiku Taimu Bāsuto).
- Genm Armor (ゲンムアーマー, Genmu Āmā): An auxiliary form accessed from the Genm (ゲンム, Genmu) Ride Watch that grants the ability to generate energy copies of the Trick Flywheels. Geiz's finisher in this form is the Critical Time Burst (クリティカルタイムバースト, Kuritikaru Taimu Bāsuto).
- Ex-Aid Armor: An auxiliary form accessed from the Ex-Aid Ride Watch that grants similar capabilities as Sougo's version. Geiz's finisher in this form is a variant of the Critical Time Burst.
- Bibill Armor (ビビルアーマー, Bibiru Āmā): A Yurusen-themed special form accessed from the Bibill (ビビル, Bibiru; Scared) Ride Watch, which is created from the Ghost Ride Watch, that grants half of Ghost Armor's powers. Geiz's finisher in this form is the Bibill Time Burst (ビビルタイムバースト, Bibiru Taimu Bāsuto). This form appears exclusively in the Hyper Battle DVD special Kamen Rider Bi Bi Bi no Bibill Geiz.

Similarly to Sougo, Geiz later acquires unique Ride Watches that allow him to achieve the following evolutions of his Rider form:

- Kamen Rider Geiz Revive (仮面ライダーゲイツリバイブ, Kamen Raidā Geitsu Ribaibu): Geiz's final form accessed from the Geiz Revive (ゲイツリバイブ, Geitsu Ribaibu) Ride Watch that can switch between two sub-forms. While transformed, he wields the Zikan Jaclaw (ジカンジャックロー, Jikan Jakkurō), which can switch between Noko Mode (のこモード, Noko Mōdo; Saw Mode) and Tsume Mode (つめモード, Tsume Mōdo; Claw Mode).
  - Geiz Revive Goretsu (ゲイツリバイブ剛烈, Geitsu Ribaibu Gōretsu): A red-colored evolution of Geiz's default form accessed from the Geiz Revive Ride Watch's Goretsu Form (剛烈フォーム, Gōretsu Fōmu; Ardent Strength Form) mode that grants superhuman strength. In this form, he primarily wields the Zikan Jaclaw in Noko Mode. His finishers in this form are the Ichigeki Time Burst (一撃タイムバースト, Ichigeki Taimu Bāsuto; One Strike Time Burst) via the Ziku-Driver and the Super Noko Setsuzan (スーパーのこ切斬, Sūpā Noko Setsuzan; Super Saw Cutting) via the Zikan Jaclaw.
  - Geiz Revive Shippu (ゲイツリバイブ疾風, Geitsu Ribaibu Shippū): A blue-colored evolution of Geiz's default form accessed from the Geiz Revive Ride Watch's Shippu Form (疾風フォーム, Shippū Fōmu; Hurricane Form) mode that grants flight capabilities and superhuman speed. In this form, he primarily wields the Zikan Jaclaw in Tsume Mode. His finishers in this form are the Hyakuretsu Time Burst (百烈タイムバースト, Hyakuretsu Taimu Bāsuto; Hundred-Fierce Time Burst) via the Ziku-Driver and the Super Tsume Renzan (スーパーつめ連斬, Sūpā Tsume Renzan; Super Claw Multi-Slash) via the Zikan Jaclaw.
- Kamen Rider Geiz Majesty (仮面ライダーゲイツマジェスティ, Kamen Raidā Geitsu Majesuti): A special form accessed from the Geiz Majesty (ゲイツマジェスティ, Geitsu Majesuti) Ride Watch that grants the ability to channel the combined powers and weapons of all 18 past secondary Heisei Kamen Riders. Geiz's finisher in this form is the El Salvatore Time Burst (エル・サルバトーレタイムバースト, Eru Sarubatōre Taimu Bāsuto). This form appears exclusively in the sequel special Kamen Rider Zi-O Next Time: Geiz, Majesty.

Geiz Myokoin is portrayed by Gaku Oshida (押田 岳, Oshida Gaku).

=== Tsukuyomi ===
Tsukuyomi (ツクヨミ), real name Alpina (アルピナ, Arupina), is a mysterious 18-year-old girl of nobility from the year 2068 and the younger sister of Time Jacker leader, Swartz. She was chosen to succeed her parents due to her chronokinetic powers, though Swartz intended to use her for his own ends. When she hesitated to stop him, he erased her memories and stranded her in Ohma Zi-O's timeline, where she ended up with a resistance movement against him under a new name. Disapproving of Geiz's plan to kill Sougo in 2018 for fear of damaging the timeline, she travels back in time with him to help Sougo avert his future through gentler means.

Initially, Tsukuyomi finds it difficult to believe the kindly Sougo could become the tyrannical Ohma Zi-O. As his Rider powers grow in strength however, she becomes paranoid and demands Geiz kill Sougo. When the former refuses, she travels back in time to the latter's childhood to do it herself. However, she discovers Swartz orchestrated everything that had happened throughout the series, including Sougo becoming Zi-O. While trying to save the younger Sougo from her brother, Tsukuyomi inadvertently causes the bus accident that claimed Sougo's parents' lives as well as severe damage to the timeline. She is saved by Tsukasa Kadoya, who shows her how Swartz kidnapped all of the children on the bus as they all had the potential to become Zi-O.

Realizing her mistake and that Sougo becoming Ohma Zi-O was one of many possible futures, a repentant Tsukuyomi makes amends with Sougo and Geiz. Soon after, she begins to slowly regain her memories after rediscovering her powers and meeting her younger self in 2058. Amidst Another Zi-O II's attacks, Tsukuyomi is captured by the Time Jackers so Swartz can reveal their original past to her before taking her powers. As she fully regains her original memories, Black Woz rescues her once Another Zi-O II is defeated.

When Swartz causes a convergence of the Kamen Rider multiverse, he attempts to kill Tsukuyomi since she had the power to stop him. However, Sougo had given a past version of her a blank Ride Watch that he infused with Ohma Zi-O's power, which activates during the calamity's height. Once Black Woz provides her with a Ziku-Driver, Tsukuyomi becomes the analog watch-themed Kamen Rider Tsukuyomi (仮面ライダーツクヨミ, Kamen Raidā Tsukuyomi) to mortally wound Swartz before he kills her in retaliation. When Sougo defeats Swartz and sacrifices Ohma Zi-O's power to undo the Time Jackers' damage, Tsukuyomi is revived in the new timeline as Alpina Tsukuyomi (月読 有日菜, Tsukuyomi Arupina), one of Sougo's contemporary classmates.

In the sequel special Kamen Rider Zi-O Next Time: Geiz, Majesty, Tsukuyomi permanently regains her memories and Rider powers while helping Geiz in his fight against Another Diend.

For most of the series, Tsukuyomi possesses her own Faiz Phone X for self-defense purposes and to communicate with her friends through time. She also owns a Time Mazine, which she lends to Sougo in the hopes of assisting him with time travel. Following Sougo's battle with the monstrous Another Agito, Tsukuyomi regains her ability to stop time. After becoming Kamen Rider Tsukuyomi, she gains the ability to generate an energy sword from her hand and can perform the Time Jack (タイムジャック, Taimu Jakku) finisher.

Tsukuyomi is portrayed by Shieri Ohata (大幡 しえり, Ōhata Shieri) while Yui Matsushima (松島 由依, Matsushima Yui) portrays her as a child.

=== Woz ===
The name "Woz" (ウォズ, Wozu) refers to two prophets from different futures who each herald a particular figure in hopes of ensuring the path to their respective futures. The name was originally held by Black Woz until White Woz's arrival in 2019, with Sougo providing distinction by labeling them with their outfits' predominant colors.

Utilizing the Woz MiRide Watch (ミライドウォッチ, Miraido Wotchi) in conjunction with the BeyonDriver (ビヨンドライバー, Biyondoraibā) belt, either version of Woz can transform into the smartwatch-themed Kamen Rider Woz (仮面ライダーウォズ, Kamen Raidā Wozu). While transformed, they can perform the Time Explosion (タイムエクスプロージョン, Taimu Ekusupurōjon) finisher. They also wield the Zikan Despear (ジカンデスピア, Jikan Desupia), which can be reconfigured into varying forms. Additionally, they possess other MiRide Watches that allow them to assume forms based on future Kamen Riders called Futurerings (フューチャーリング, Fyūchāringu), which are as follows:

- Futurering Shinobi (フューチャーリングシノビ, Fyūchāringu Shinobi): An auxiliary form accessed from the Shinobi (シノビ) MiRide Watch that grants proficiency in ninjutsu. In this form, Woz primarily wields the Zikan Despear in Kama Mode (カマモード, Kama Mōdo; Scythe Mode). Their finishers in this form are the Ninpō: Time Binding Jutsu (忍法・時間縛りの術, Ninpō Jikan Shibari no Jutsu) via the BeyonDriver and the Ichigeki Kaman (一撃カマーン, Ichigeki Kamān; One Strike Kaman) via the Zikan Despear.
- Futurering Quiz (フューチャーリングクイズ, Fyūchāringu Kuizu): An auxiliary form accessed from the Quiz (クイズ, Kuizu) MiRide Watch that grants worldwide knowledge and the ability to determine the answer to a riddle for their targets. In this form, Woz primarily wields the Zikan Despear in Tsue Mode (ツエモード, Tsue Mōdo; Cane Mode). As the original Kamen Rider Quiz attacks through riddles, Woz does so as well while in this form. However, this ability can be negated if the riddle's answer is debatable or if Woz does not know the answer themselves. Their finishers in this form are the Quiz Shock Break (クイズショックブレイク, Kuizu Shokku Bureiku) via the BeyonDriver and the Fukashigi Magic (不可思議マジック, Fukashigi Majikku; Mysterious Magic) via the Zikan Despear.
- Futurering Kikai (フューチャーリングキカイ, Fyūchāringu Kikai): An auxiliary form accessed from the Kikai (キカイ) MiRide Watch that grants the ability to turn nearby humans into manipulable Semi Humanoise (セミヒューマノイズ, Semi Hyūmanoizu) androids for combat assistance. In this form, Woz primarily wields the Zikan Despear in Yari Mode (ヤリモード, Yari Mōdo; Spear Mode). Their finishers in this form are the Full Metal Break (フルメタルブレイク, Furu Metaru Bureiku) via the BeyonDriver and the Bakuretsu de Lance (爆裂DEランス, Bakuretsu De Ransu; Explosion of Lance) via the Zikan Despear.

After his encounter with Kamen Rider Ginga, Black Woz acquires the Ginga (ギンガ) MiRide Watch, which allows him to transform into his final form; Kamen Rider Woz Ginga Finaly (仮面ライダーウォズギンガファイナリー, Kamen Raidā Ginga Fainarī). While transformed, he gains chorokinesis. His finisher in this form is the Cho Ginga Explosion (超ギンガエクスプロージョン, Chō Ginga Ekusupurōjon; Super Galaxy Explosion). He can also change the Ginga MiRide Watch's setting to assume one of the following forms:

- Kamen Rider Woz Ginga Wakusei Form (仮面ライダーウォズギンガワクセイフォーム, Kamen Raidā Wozu Ginga Wakusei Fōmu): A variant of Kamen Rider Woz Ginga Finaly accessed from the Ginga MiRide Watch's Wakusei Mode (ワクセイモード, Wakusei Mōdo; Planet Mode) that grants planekinesis. His finisher in this form is the Sui-Kin-Chi-Ka-Moku-Do-Ten-Kai Explosion (水金地火木土天海エクスプロージョン, Sui Kin Chi Ka Moku Do Ten Kai Ekusupurōjon; Mercury-Venus-Earth-Mars-Jupiter-Saturn-Uranus-Neptune Explosion).
- Kamen Rider Woz Ginga Taiyo Form (仮面ライダーウォズギンガタイヨウフォーム, Kamen Raidā Wozu Ginga Taiyō Fōmu): A variant of Kamen Rider Woz Ginga Finaly accessed from the Ginga MiRide Watch's Taiyo Mode (タイヨウモード, Taiyō Mōdo; Sun Mode) that grants solarkinesis. His finisher in this form is the Burning Sun Explosion (バーニングサンエクスプロージョン, Bāningu San Ekusupurōjon).

As they are the same person from different timelines, both versions of Woz are portrayed by Keisuke Watanabe (渡邊 圭祐, Watanabe Keisuke).

==== Black Woz ====
The primary timeline version of Woz, also known as Black Woz (黒ウォズ, Kuro Wozu), is a so-called "mysterious prophet" and member of the Quartzers who considers himself a devoted follower of Ohma Zi-O and possesses a book of prophecies called the Ohma Advent Calendar (逢魔降臨暦, Ōma Kōrin Reki), which details the history of his master's rise to power. He also takes on the role of narrator for the series and interacts with the viewers to recount Sougo's adventures. After giving Sougo his Rider powers and despite learning of his intention to become a benevolent lord instead of a tyrant, a surprised Black Woz remains loyal to him as the latter's only concern is assuring Sougo's destiny of becoming Ohma Zi-O regardless by providing his services and occasionally intervening to rescue the youth from harm. Woz's dedication to ensuring his ruler's history initially made him fickle towards Sougo's friends and the Time Jackers, helping either side whenever Woz believed Sougo is straying too far from the intended path.

After being attacked and wounded by Geiz Revive, Black Woz forms a temporary alliance with the Time Jacker Heure to steal White Woz's Rider powers so he can force Geiz to overuse his Revive form and kill him. However, Sougo's influence on him causes Black Woz to support the former's decision to change his future. Because of this, once Sougo and Geiz settle their differences, Black Woz makes peace with Geiz and Tsukuyomi and moves in with them and Sougo. Despite being caught off-guard when Sougo transforms into Ohma Zi-O to defeat Swartz before sacrificing his power to fix the timeline, Black Woz remains unaffected and continues to watch over Sougo in the new timeline.

During the events of the stage show Kamen Rider Zi-O: Final Stage, Black Woz is temporarily turned into the villainous and overzealous Tsukuyomi supporter, Red Woz (赤ウォズ, Aka Wozu), before returning to his senses.

Throughout the series, Black Woz has a habit of declaring "rejoice" (祝え, iwae) whenever Sougo obtains a new Ride Watch and Rider Armor, to the point where he becomes pleased when Sougo asks him to do so. While he usually does this for Sougo, Black Woz begrudgingly does so once for Geiz when the latter attains his Majesty form. Black Woz also demonstrates special skills such as deflecting Another Fourze's attack with one hand and using his scarf to teleport himself and others. Additionally, he can also travel through time without using a Time Mazine. Prior to obtaining Kamen Rider Woz's powers, Black Woz could use the Ohma Advent Calendar to trap his target and destroy SOUGO's time portals by ripping out the book's pages. In Kamen Rider Heisei Generations Forever, Black Woz is able to access Philip's Gaia Library to learn more about Imagin and give Sougo information about them.

==== White Woz ====
White Woz (白ウォズ, Shiro Wozu) is a version of Woz who hails from an alternate future that came into being after Sougo temporarily renounced his Rider powers and is fanatically devoted to Geiz, who by his time defeated Ohma Zi-O as Geiz Revive. Despite sharing a common goal with Geiz and Tsukuyomi, White Woz's apathetic and sadistic approach along with his desire to see his future come to pass puts them at odds. After getting MiRide Watches from three future Kamen Riders, he uses their combined power to create the Geiz Revive Ride Watch and presents it to Geiz.

Not long after however, the Time Riders learn that White Woz only needed Geiz to defeat Ohma Zi-O to ensure his own existence, regardless if Geiz survives or not, and has been helping Swartz the entire time. After being tricked into transferring his Rider powers to Black Woz and Geiz and Sougo making peace with each other, White Woz begins to fade away due to his timeline being erased. Despite this, he realizes he should not have supported Swartz and combines his residual Rider energy with the Zi-O II and Geiz Revive Ride Watches to create the Zi-O Trinity Ride Watch. Accepting his fate, White Woz warns Black Woz of Swartz's goals before fully fading away. Weeks later, as part of the final phase of his endgame, Swartz summons an Another World version of White Woz to distract Black Woz. However, the former learns the full extent of Swartz's plans and attempts to tell the Time Riders, but vanishes due to Another World's destruction before he could do so.

In the sequel special Kamen Rider Zi-O Next Time: Geiz, Majesty, a second Another World version of White Woz appears in the rewritten timeline to kill Geiz and steal Daiki Kaito's Rider powers to become Another Diend to manufacture disasters and pass himself as a savior. After Geiz Majesty defeats him, this White Woz's essence is absorbed into Black Woz while Kaito regains his powers.

While he lacks Black Woz's abilities, the original White Woz possesses a tablet book-like device that allows him to manipulate the flow of time, shift certain events' outcomes in his favor, and negate the Time Jackers' chronokinetic powers by simply writing or speaking whatever he wants to happen into it. Due to his home timeline being an alternate version of 2068, White Woz also possesses his own Time Mazine, which allows him to travel to alternate timelines.

As Another Diend, White Woz has the ability to manipulate an army of Kasshine, summon past Heisei era monsters via card-like constructs, and is capable of performing his own version of Diend's Dimension Shoot finisher.

==== Third Woz ====
The Third Woz (第三のウォズ, Daisan no Wozu) is the main antagonist of the tie-in novel Novel: Kamen Rider Zi-O. Sometime after the events of the V-Cinema Geiz Majesty, he creates a new timeline where Inner Sougo rises to the title of Ohma Zi-O through the power of Another Watches. Wanting to ensure the events leading to the original Ohma Zi-O's ascension comes to pass, Third Woz conspires with Inner Sougo to transform the latter's versions of Geiz and Tsukuyomi into each other's Another Rider counterparts to lure Black Woz and Sougo to their timeline. Third Woz later steals Black Woz's Rider powers to transform into Another Woz (アナザーウォズ, Anazā Wozu), only to be defeated by Zi-O II and cease to exist when the previous timeline is restored.

Like White Woz, Third Woz wields a tablet that can manipulate the flow of time to his favor.

== Recurring characters ==
=== Junichirō Tokiwa ===
Junichirō Tokiwa (常磐 順一郎, Tokiwa Jun'ichirō) is Sougo's great uncle and owner of 9-to-5 (クジゴジ堂, Kujigojidō), a clock shop that also serves as his and Sougo's home. Even though his shop specializes in repairing clocks, he rarely has orders to fix them and usually repairs other old devices to make ends meet. In spite of this, he has demonstrated a form of intellect in repairing unique devices, such as Sougo's Ride Watches and Kamen Rider Den-O's DenLiner.

Junichirō Tokiwa is portrayed by Katsuhisa Namase (生瀬 勝久, Namase Katsuhisa).

=== Ohma Zi-O ===
Kamen Rider Ohma Zi-O (仮面ライダーオーマジオウ, Kamen Raidā Ōma Jiō), known simply as Ohma Zi-O (オーマジオウ, Ōma Jiō) or "Demon King" (魔王, Maō), is the chronograph-themed dictator of Earth in the year 2068. Due to his immense power, Tsukuyomi and Geiz travel back in time to 2018 in the hopes of intercepting Ohma Zi-O's past self and prevent his rise to power. When Tsukasa Kadoya sends Sougo and Tsukuyomi to 2068, Ohma Zi-O has them brought before him so he can mock his past self's naiveté and overpower him, advising him to renounce being Zi-O if he refuses to accept his destiny of becoming him before sending him back to 2018. Along the way however, Sougo and his friends discover that Ohma Zi-O is from a possible future and that his existence is fixed after a future where he was defeated by Geiz Revive came into existence. Furthermore, Sougo changed Ohma's Day (オーマの日, Ōma no Hi), the day he was to become Ohma Zi-O, when he became Zi-O Trinity instead.

When Swartz initiates his endgame, Sougo returns to 2068 to confront Ohma Zi-O for a final battle, deducing the tyrant never intended to kill him. The future Sougo reveals that his power to destroy time and space is stronger than Swartz's before sending his younger self back with a blank Ride Watch. While Sougo becomes Ohma Zi-O in 2019, he chooses to sacrifice the power to undo Swartz's damage to the timeline. Impressed by his younger self's choice, Ohma Zi-O peacefully lets himself be erased from existence.

In an alternate timeline depicted in the film Kamen Rider Zi-O the Movie: Over Quartzer, Ohma Zi-O's existence is revealed to be the result of the Quartzers' influence on Sougo's timeline and orchestrated by Sougo's original future counterpart, who intended to erase the Kamen Riders' influence on the Heisei era. Once he became aware of the Quartzers' plot, Ohma Zi-O supports his younger self in defeating their alternate self by giving him his personal Ride Watch.

In the Rider Time web series Decade VS Zi-O and Zi-O VS Decade, an alternate version of Ohma Zi-O, referred to as True Sougo (真実のソウゴ, Shinjitsu no Sōgo), creates and destroys new worlds until his powers are diminished. In response, he instigates the King's Death Game to find a new host to inhabit and restore his full strength. After defeating Kamen Rider Decade's party of Kamen Riders, Ohma Zi-O merges six dimensions into the prime Sougo's universe, but is regressed into the form of an amnesiac young boy that Tsukuyomi takes care of. Upon regaining his memories, Ohma Zi-O defeats Decade, only to be distracted by Tsukuyomi and killed by Zi-O.

The future Sougo transforms into Ohma Zi-O via an upgraded version of the Ziku-Driver called the Ohma Zi-O Driver (オーマジオウドライバー, Ōma Jiō Doraibā). Like the Time Jackers, Ohma Zi-O has chronokinetic abilities, which are powerful enough to destroy an entire army of resistance fighters within seconds and summon a past Heisei Kamen Rider from their time period to his aid. While he also possesses Ride Watches, he is able to use their individual powers by pressing their activation buttons.

Ohma Zi-O is voiced by Rikiya Koyama (小山 力也, Koyama Rikiya) while his civilian form is portrayed by Seiji Takaiwa (高岩 成二, Takaiwa Seiji). In the Rider Time series, True Sougo's younger form is portrayed by Shunta Ito (伊藤 駿太, Itō Shunta).

=== Time Jackers ===
The Time Jackers (タイムジャッカー, Taimu Jakkā) are a group of time travelers brought together by Swartz, who gifted his subordinates with the ability to freeze time, that seek to prevent Ohma Zi-O's existence by replacing him with an Another Rider. While claiming this goal is just, they are either apathetic to the consequences of altering the timeline or unconcerned with spoiling future events.

Following the Time Jackers' defeat at the end of the series, Finis attempts to seek revenge during the events of the film Kamen Rider Reiwa: The First Generation, only to be defeated like her fellow Time Jackers.

==== Swartz ====
Swartz (スウォルツ, Suworutsu) is the cool-headed and ruthless leader of the Time Jackers and Tsukuyomi's older brother. Preferring to take the direct approach, he sees friend and foe alike as pawns in his schemes. Originally from an alternate version of 2058, Swartz sought to protect his reality by destroying the multiverse and rule all of time and space. In his youth, he was irate over being passed over to succeed his parents, whose power he intended to use in his goals. When Tsukuyomi attempted to stop him, he stranded her in Ohma Zi-O's timeline with no memory of her past.

After growing older, Swartz commenced a long-term plot by forming the Time Jackers and influencing Sougo's life by installing his dream of becoming king; orchestrating the events that would lead to him becoming Zi-O and create the ideal conditions for fulfilling his ambition. Swartz also orchestrates Hiryū becoming Another Zi-O II to capture Tsukuyomi and take her powers along with those of Tsukasa Kadoya's before abandoning both the Time Jackers and Hiryū once they serve their purpose as he initiates a multiversal convergence. However, Swartz meets his end when Sougo becomes Ohma Zi-O and kills him before using his powers to undo the former's damage. In the new timeline, Swartz became Sougo's contemporary principal.

Swartz possesses teleportation, memory manipulation, and powerful chronokinetic abilities that allow him to freeze time. He can also travel to alternate timelines, something normal Time Mazines are incapable of doing, and bestow a weaker form of his chronokinetic powers unto others, which he can take back at his leisure. Swartz later acquires the ability to become Another Decade, gaining the ability to manipulate Dimensional Walls like Tsukasa and Daiki Kaito, he can use them to attack or bind enemies as well as spirit people into his personal pocket dimension, Another World (アナザーワールド, Anazā Wārudo), so he can summon alternate reality versions of past Dark Riders to take their place.

Swartz is portrayed by Kentarou Kanesaki (兼崎 健太郎, Kanesaki Kentarō) while Tenma Naruse (成瀬 天馬, Naruse Tenma) portrays him as a teenager.

==== Heure ====
Heure (ウール, Ūru) is the youngest member of the Time Jackers, whose childishness conceals his cruelty and arrogance as he manipulates his targets into forming Another Rider contracts by doing something for them to place them in his debt. Due to his infantile personality, he quickly becomes displeased when things do not go his way and acts in a more ruthless manner to ensure his success. After Swartz and Ora use him as a host for the parasitic Another Kikai, Heure becomes wary of his fellow Time Jackers as well as suspicious over his leader's true goals. This, combined with his growing curiosity over the truth of "Ohma's Day", cause him to become more willing to work with Black Woz. When Swartz reveals his true colors and takes away his powers, Heure escapes with Ora to seek out the Time Riders' protection, only to be killed by her so she could ensure her own protection. After Sougo sacrifices his power as Ohma Zi-O to undo the Time Jackers' damage, Heure is revived as a contemporary classmate of Sougo's in the new timeline.

Like the other Time Jackers, Swartz gifted Heure chronokinetic abilities, though the latter also demonstrated telekinetic powers. Additionally, Heure pilots a personalized Time Mazine that resembles Kamen Rider Ghost's Captain Ghost, which can also transform into a copy of the Rider's Iguana Ghostriker.

Heure is portrayed by Rihito Itagaki (板垣 李光人, Itagaki Rihito).

==== Ora ====
Ora (オーラ, Ōra) is a female member of the Time Jackers with a calm, gentle disposition who prefers to use persuasion to form Another Rider contracts by exploiting targets while they are in a state of emotional distress. While appearing outwardly gentle, her patience has its limits, especially when dealing with her fellow Time Jackers. After Swartz takes her powers away to enact his own plans, a disillusioned Ora joins Heure to seek out the Time Riders for protection until she learns she is being hunted by the Paradox Roidmude. Vengeful and frightened, she kills Heure and returns to Swartz in an attempt to kill him as well, only for Swartz to see through her plan and kill her instead. After Sougo reverses the Time Jackers' damage, Ora is revived as a contemporary classmate of his in the new timeline.

Like the other Time Jackers, Swartz gifted Ora with chronokinetic abilities. She also pilots a personalized Time Mazine that resembles Kamen Rider Kiva's Castle Doran. After losing her chronokinetic abilities, she uses dark energy capable of obliterating targets.

Ora is portrayed by Ayaka Konno (紺野 彩夏, Kon'no Ayaka).

=== Another Riders ===
The Another Riders (アナザーライダー, Anazā Raidā), also known as Kaijin Riders (怪人ライダー, Kaijin Raidā), are monsters created by the Time Jackers to serve as contenders for their version of Ohma Zi-O. In certain cases, the original history of a Kamen Rider can create Another Riders all on its own. Each Another Rider is created when a Time Jacker uses an Another Watch (アナザーウォッチ, Anazāwotchi) on a person, transforming them into a corrupted version of an established Kamen Rider. To defeat Another Riders, the Time Riders have to use a corresponding Ride Watch or one of their stronger forms. While the Time Jackers succeed in having their Another Riders replace most of the Heisei era Riders in history, Sougo uses Ohma Zi-O's powers to undo their damage.

==== Hiryū Kakogawa ====
Hiryū Kakogawa (加古川 飛流, Kakogawa Hiryū) is a young man capable of transforming into the Another Rider, Another Zi-O (アナザージオウ, Anazā Jiō). Like Sougo, he is a survivor of the bus accident caused by Swartz, who abducted them and the other children due to their potential to become Zi-O. As a result, Hiryū developed a misguided vendetta against Sougo. After his first defeat as Another Zi-O, Hiryū feels insulted by Sougo's attempts to empathize with him and became more arrogant and ruthless as he proceeds to acquire all 19 Heisei Another Watches to become Another Zi-O II (アナザージオウII, Anazā Jiō Tsū), only to be defeated by Sougo a second time. Following this, Swartz abandons Hiryū while Daiki Kaito steals his Another Watch.

During the events of the stage show, Kamen Rider Zi-O: Final Stage, Hiryū joins forces with the remaining Quartzers and gains the means to become the second Kamen Rider Barlckxs before becoming Another Ohma Zi-O (アナザーオーマジオウ, Anazā Ōma Jiō) after he obtains Ride Watches based on Kamen Riders 1, 2, V3, Riderman, X, Amazon, and Stronger. While he manages to overwhelm the Time Riders with his new power, he is defeated by the combined efforts of Zi-O Ohma Form and Ohma Zi-O.

As Another Zi-O, Hiryū possesses Zi-O II's clairvoyance and dual wields a pair of clock hand-like swords, which he can combine into a naginata to perform a variation of Zi-O II's King Edge of Time Slash. He can also use the Heisei Another Riders' Another Watches to assume their forms. After becoming Another Zi-O II, Hiryū gains Grand Zi-O's chronokinetic powers and the ability to summon Another Riders from across time. His Another Watch, which is docked in a black version of the Ziku-Driver instead of being absorbed into his body, is able to reconstitute itself until Kamen Riders Zi-O and Decade join forces to destroy it.

Hiryū Kakogawa is portrayed by Yu Sakuma (佐久間 悠, Sakuma Yū) while Taiga Komie (込江 大牙, Komie Taiga) portrays him as a child.

==== Heisei Another Riders ====
- Another Build (アナザービルド, Anazā Birudo): An Another Rider based on Kamen Rider Build with the ability to shoot flaming basketballs from his hands, access the individual powers of his template's Rabbit and Tank Fullbottles, distill athletes' essences into Fullbottles, and use them to augment himself. He was originally a young basketball player from 2017 whom Heure saved from his predestined death by car accident. One year later, Another Build attacks Sougo before the latter transforms into Kamen Rider Zi-O and defeats him. However, Heure revives the monster with increased power. In response, Zi-O and Geiz travel back in time to 2017 to defeat Another Build's past iteration. Following this, the basketball player is left with no memory of being Another Build, though his death was still averted due to Heure's earlier actions. The basketball player is portrayed by Taisei Mori (森 大成, Mori Taisei).
- Another Ex-Aid (アナザーエグゼイド, Anazā Eguzeido): An Another Rider based on Kamen Rider Ex-Aid and the Bugsters with the ability to perform inhuman feats based on platform games, travel into Game Worlds (ゲームの世界, Gēmu no Sekai), and summon Bugster Virus A (バグスターウイルスA, Bagusutā Uirusu Ē) foot soldiers to aid him. He was originally Iida (飯田), who created the "game that cannot be cleared by anyone" (誰もクリアしたことのないゲーム, Dare mo kuria shita koto no nai gēmu) in the present to capture young boys and find a compatible heart donor for his son, Keisuke (ケイスケ), due to his hatred for doctors. After being defeated by Zi-O in 2016, Keisuke is put under Hiiro Kagami's care so he could be cured before his disease worsened. Iida is portrayed by Takashi Kodama (児玉 貴志, Kodama Takashi).
- Ryūichi Sakuma (佐久間 龍一, Sakuma Ryūichi): An alumnus of the Ryusei School who Ora gave the ability to become Another Faiz in 2003 to revive his childhood friend, Karin Yamabuki (山吹 カリン, Yamabuki Karin), and prolong her life by extracting bio-energy from girls who shared her age and birthday. By the time Sakuma and Karin attended Amanogawa High School in 2011, he loses the ability to become Another Faiz. To make up for this, Swartz gives him the ability to become Another Fourze. After facing Zi-O in 2011 and Geiz in 2003, Sakuma is defeated in both timelines, realizes he was hurting Karin more than he was helping her, and is forced to accept her death. Ryūichi Sakuma is portrayed by Atomu Mizuishi (水石 亜飛夢, Mizuishi Atomu).
  - Another Fourze (アナザーフォーゼ, Anazā Fōze): An Another Rider based on Kamen Rider Fourze and the Zodiarts who can either absorb or supply bio-energy and use the switches on his belt to summon Energy Modules (エネルギーモジュール, Enerugī Mojūru) based on his template's Fourze Modules.
  - Another Faiz (アナザーファイズ, Anazā Faizu): An Another Rider Based on Kamen Rider Faiz who is also able to absorb bio-energy as well as summon a red aura to perform a variation of his template's Crimson Smash. This was Sakuma's original Another Rider form until it died out in 2011 and was revived following Another Fourze's defeat.
- Another Wizard (アナザーウィザード, Anazā Wizādo): An Another Rider based on Kamen Rider Wizard wielding a ring that allows him to channel his template's Wizard Rings' abilities. He was originally Hayase (早瀬), who uses his powers to support the theater he works at and impress its owner, Kaori Kinoshita (木ノ下 香織, Kinoshita Kaori), whom he has a crush on. Due to his inability to confess his feelings however, Kaori became engaged to another man, causing Hayase to seek revenge. After Geiz intercepts his past self in 2012 and destroys his Another Watch, he and Sougo help the present Hayase make contact with his past self and encourage him to confess his feelings regardless of what happens. Hayase is portrayed by Zuimaro Awashima (粟島 瑞丸, Awashima Zuimaro).
- Another OOO (アナザーオーズ, Anazā Ōzu): An Another Rider based on Kamen Rider OOO and the Greeed. See here for more details.
- Another Gaim (アナザー鎧武, Anazā Gaimu): An Another Rider based on Kamen Rider Gaim and the Overlords who possesses a zanbatō and the ability to open zipper-like Crack (クラック, Kurakku) portals that connect to a pseudo-Helheim (ヘルヘイム, Heruheimu) pocket dimension, and command over an army of Inves-like monsters. He was originally Asura (アスラ) of the dance group Team Baron before he was ousted by his leader, Kaito Kumon in 2013. After becoming Another Gaim, Asura takes over Team Baron and banishes anyone who challenges him to Helheim. Though he is defeated by Zi-O in 2013, this was undone by the "Man of the Beginning" so Sougo can rescue Geiz after he was trapped in Helheim. Once he does so, the future Sougo returns to 2013 to defeat Another Gaim permanently while his present self does the same. Asura is portrayed by Yuuki Tomotsune (友常 勇気, Tomotsune Yūki).
- Another Ghost (アナザーゴースト, Anazā Gōsuto): An Another Rider based on Kamen Rider Ghost who can use his chest-mounted eye to absorb human souls for use as a hoodie armament, summon Gamma Commando-like familiars and Hoodie Ghosts for support, and perform a variation of his template's Omega Drive. He was originally Makimura (マキムラ), a policeman from 2015 who was killed in the line of duty and forced to become Another Ghost after refusing Heure's offer to be saved. He uses his powers to prevent accidents by targeting their instigators before his death is averted and he is defeated by Kamen Rider Zi-O. Makimura is portrayed by Naotaka Horiike (堀池 直毅, Horiike Naotaka).
- Another Den-O (アナザー電王, Anazā Den'ō): An Another Rider based on Kamen Rider Den-O who possesses four swords and can travel through time on the Another DenLiner (アナザーデンライナー, Anazā Denrainā) bullet train.
  - The first Another Den-O the Time Riders encountered was Ataru Hisanaga, who was used by the Super Time Jacker Tid and defeated by the original Kamen Rider Den-O in 2018 during the events of the film Kamen Rider Heisei Generations Forever.
  - The second Another Den-O was originally Takuya Endō (遠藤 タクヤ, Endō Takuya), who blames the death of his late sister, Sayuri (サユリ), on her remorseful boyfriend, Yukihiro Ōsumi (大澄 ユキヒロ, Ōsumi Yukihiro). After Ora turns him into Another Den-O in 2019, Takuya attempts to steal Den-O's DenLiner so he can go back in time to 2017 and prevent Sayuri's death. While in the past and fending off the Time Riders, Den-O, Kamen Rider Zeronos, and a Mole Imagin that Yukihiro unintentionally formed a contract with, the past Takuya learns his sister's death was caused by his future Another Rider self. His future self gains assistance from a pack of Mole Imagin before they are defeated by Grand Zi-O, Den-O, and Zeronos while past Takuya reconciles with Yukihiro. Takuya Endō is portrayed by Dai Goto (後藤 大, Gotō Dai).
- Another W (アナザーダブル, Anazā Daburu): An Another Rider based on Kamen Rider W who possesses aerokinesis and can channel the Luna Memory's power. During the events of Kamen Rider Heisei Generations Forever, he is created from an unknown person to serve as Tid's second-in-command, lead past monster combatants, and transform Ataru into Another Den-O. He is destroyed by Zi-O. Another W is voiced by Kentarō Itō (伊藤 健太郎, Itō Kentarō).
- Another Kuuga (アナザークウガ, Anazā Kūga): A giant-sized Another Rider based on Kamen Rider Kuuga and the Grongi. See here for more details.
- Another Ryuga (アナザーリュウガ, Anazā Ryūga): Also known as Kamen Rider Ryuga, he originally existed outside of the primary Kamen Rider timeline before Heure summoned Ryuga to turn him into an Another Rider version of himself.
- Another Ryuki (アナザー龍騎, Anazā Ryūki): An Another Rider based on Kamen Rider Ryuki. In addition to Tatsuya Kanō and a version under Hiryu's command, a third Another Ryuki appears in the Rider Time web series Decade VS Zi-O as a servant and obstacle in True Sougo's King's Death Game.
- Another Blade (アナザーブレイド, Anazā Bureido): An Another Rider based on Kamen Rider Blade. See here for more details.
- Another Agito (アナザーアギト, Anazā Agito) Army: A zombie-like Time Jacker variant based on the original Another Agito.
- Another Hibiki (アナザー響鬼, Anazā Hibiki): An Another Rider based on Kamen Rider Hibiki and the Makamou. He was originally Tsutomu Tsuzumiya (鼓屋 ツトム, Tsuzumiya Tsutomu), a disciple of the current Kamen Rider Hibiki, Kyosuke Kiriya, as well as Sougo's childhood friend. After Tsutomu left Kiriya because his master felt he was inadequate to take on the Hibiki title from his master, Tsuzumiya was unwillingly turned into Another Hibiki despite wanting to become an oni in his own right. Once Kiriya accepts his responsibilities and properly becomes Kamen Rider Hibiki, he and Zi-O Trinity save Tsutomu and Kiriya reconciles with his student. Tsutomu Tsuzumiya is portrayed by Rihito Noda (野田 理人, Noda Rihito) as a young adult and by Yura Sato (佐藤 結良, Satō Yura) as a child.
- Another Kiva (アナザーキバ, Anazā Kiba): An Another Rider based on Kamen Rider Kiva and the Fangire who can command Kiva's Arms Monsters and wield them in their weapon forms. She was originally Yūko Kitajima (北島 祐子, Kitajima Yūko), who became a serial killer in 2015 after being dumped by her ex-boyfriend Tetsuya Tagami (田上 哲也, Tagami Tetsuya) and beating his new girlfriend to death. Ora exploits her situation to turn Yūko into Another Kiva, but the latter's unstable mind makes her immune to the Time Jackers' control. After nearly manipulating Sougo into serving her, Geiz saves him before Kamen Rider Woz defeats her. Following this, Ora kills Yūko, who dies in Sougo's arms. Yūko Kitajima is portrayed by Yumiko Shaku (釈 由美子, Shaku Yumiko).
- Another Kabuto (アナザーカブト, Anazā Kabuto): An Another Rider based on Kamen Rider Kabuto and the Worms. See here for more details.
- Another Decade (アナザーディケイド, Anazā Dikeido): An Another Rider based on Kamen Rider Decade and Chinomanako Diend. See here for more details.
- Another Drive (アナザードライブ, Anazā Doraibu): An Another Rider based on Kamen Rider Drive, Mashin Chaser, and the Roidmudes. See here for more details.
- Another Diend (アナザーディエンド, Anazā Diendo): An Another Rider based on Kamen Rider Diend and Chinomanako Diend. See here for more details.
- Another Tsukuyomi (アナザーツクヨミ, Anazā Tsukuyomi): An Another Rider based on Kamen Rider Tsukuyomi who appears exclusively in the tie-in novel Novel: Kamen Rider Zi-O. After Third Woz creates a new timeline, he brainwashes its version of Geiz into becoming Another Tsukuyomi in order to lure the "prime" Sougo and Black Woz. Another Tsukuyomi is defeated by Zi-O II.
- Another Geiz (アナザーゲイツ, Anazā Geitsu): An Another Rider based on Kamen Rider Geiz who can evolve into Another Geiz Revive Shippu (アナザーゲイツリバイブ疾風, Anazā Geitsu Ribaibu Shippū), which is based on Kamen Rider Geiz Revive Shippu, and appears exclusively in the tie-in novel Novel: Kamen Rider Zi-O. After Third Woz creates a new timeline, he brainwashes its version of Tsukuyomi into becoming Another Geiz in order to lure the "prime" Sougo and Black Woz. She is defeated by Kamen Rider Woz.
- Another Woz (アナザーウォズ, Anazā Wozu): See here for more details.
- Another Ohma Zi-O Trinity (アナザーオーマジオウトリニティ, Anazā Ōma Jiō Toriniti): See here for more details.

==== Post-Heisei Another Riders ====
- Another Shinobi (アナザーシノビ, Anazā Shinobi): Also known as Kamen Rider Shinobi, a future Rider who Sougo brought into existence. Swartz coerces Heure to turn Shinobi's present-day counterpart into an Another Rider version of himself.
- Another Quiz (アナザークイズ, Anazā Kuizu): An Another Rider based on Kamen Rider Quiz who possesses the power to steal other people's intelligence and enhance his own. He was originally the father of Kamen Rider Quiz, Tamotsu Dōan (堂安 保, Dōan Tamotsu), a scientist obsessed with advancing his work, to the point where he neglected his family and used his powers as Another Quiz to steal other researchers' knowledge. He is defeated by Kamen Rider Woz. Tamotsu Dōan is portrayed by Yoichiro Saito (斉藤 陽一郎, Saitō Yōichirō).
- Another Kikai (アナザーキカイ, Anazā Kikai): An Another Rider based on Kamen Rider Kikai with its template's powers: the ability to conjure vines from its hands, fly, and fire missiles. Its true form is a parasitic insect that becomes its face, which can survive every defeat and latch onto any form of organic matter to recreate its Another Rider body. As a result of Sougo's innate ability to create alternate futures, he inadvertently creates Another Kikai as a counterpart to Kamen Rider Kikai. The Another Rider becomes a target of the Time Jackers, who seek its Another Watch, but the Time Riders are able to retrieve its MiRide Watch, so Kamen Rider Woz can permanently defeat Another Kikai.
- Another Zero-One (アナザーゼロワン, Anazā Zero Wan): An Another Rider based on Kamen Rider Zero-One and the Magias. See here for more details.
- Another Hattari (アナザーハッタリ, Anazā Hattari): An Another Rider based on Kamen Rider Hattari who does not appear to need an Another Watch that appears exclusively in the web special Kamen Rider Geats Extra: Kamen Rider Tycoon meets Kamen Rider Shinobi.

==== Shōwa Another Riders ====
- Another 1 (アナザー1号, Anazā Ichigō): A giant-sized Another Rider based on Kamen Rider 1, an alternate universe version of 1 depicted in the film Kamen Rider The First, and Kamen Rider Core. See here for more details.

== Guest characters ==
- Kasshine (カッシーン, Kasshīn): A loyal mechanical servant of Ohma Zi-O's, operated by a built-in AI unit, who wields a spear and can also use mechanical limbs for additional support. He is sent back in time to kill Geiz. After Sougo discards his Ziku-Driver, Kasshine is rendered inoperable before Swartz reprograms it to kill the boy despite no longer being a threat to the Time Jacker. However Sougo is able to defeat it once he regains his powers. Kasshine is voiced by Kenjiro Tsuda (津田 健次郎, Tsuda Kenjirō).
- Future Kamen Riders: Riders who originate from possible future timelines that came into being due to Sougo's growing strength as Zi-O and gaining the ability to create such time periods. While each of the future Riders share the same Mirai Driver (ミライドライバー, Mirai Doraibā; Future Driver) belt, they have different names and Driver attachments in each time period.
  - Rentarō Kagura (神蔵 蓮太郎, Kagura Rentarō): A ninja from 2022 who can transform into Kamen Rider Shinobi (仮面ライダーシノビ, Kamen Raidā Shinobi) via the Shuriken Starter (シュリケンスターター, Shuriken Sutātā) in conjunction with the Shinobi Driver (シノビドライバー, Shinobi Doraibā) belt. While transformed, he uses ninjutsu and elemental attacks, wields a ninjatō, and can perform the Finish Ninpō (フィニッシュ忍法, Finisshu Ninpō) finisher. By his time, Rentarō was chosen by his mentor, Master Gamano, to become Shinobi. Despite his proficiency in ninjutsu, Rentarō is forced to play the role of a hapless ninja in order to hide his secret identity and defend his little sister Iroha until she turns 18. In 2019, Rentarō is an ordinary man who longs to protect the weak, as he has a personal stake due to a troubled life as a weakling himself. However, he harbors vengeful feelings towards bullies, which Swartz uses to turn him into Another Shinobi, granting him his future self's abilities. Though Rentarō is able to overcome his personal demons with Sougo's encouragement, Swartz brainwashes Rentarō into turning back into Another Shinobi before the latter is defeated by Kamen Rider Woz. Rentarō Kagura is portrayed by Hideya Tawada (多和田 任益, Tawada Hideya).
  - Mondo Dōan (堂安 主水, Dōan Mondo): A genius riddle enthusiast from 2040 who can transform into Kamen Rider Quiz (仮面ライダークイズ, Kamen Raidā Kuizu) via the Quiz Topper (クイズトッパー, Kuizu Toppā) card in conjunction with the Quiz Driver (クイズドライバー, Kuizu Doraibā) belt. In battle, he asks his enemies questions that can determine the outcome of the battle depending on how they answer and can perform the Final Quiz Flash (ファイナルクイズフラッシュ, Fainaru Kuizu Furasshu) finisher. White Woz helps Mondo travel to 2019 to find his missing father, who disappeared before the latter was born. After fighting and working with the Time Riders to defeat Another Quiz, Mondo reconciles with his father and eventually returns to his time. Mondo Dōan is portrayed by Katsuhiro Suzuki (鈴木 勝大, Suzuki Katsuhiro).
  - Rento Makina (真紀那 レント, Makina Rento): A Humanoise (ヒューマノイズ, Hyūmanoizu) from the year 2121 who can transform into Kamen Rider Kikai (仮面ライダーキカイ, Kamen Raidā Kikai) via the wrench-like Spannerder (スパナーダー, Supanādā) and the screwdriver-like Screwder (スクリューダー, Sukuryūdā) in conjunction with the Kikai Driver (キカイドライバー, Kikai Doraibā) belt. Due to being solar powered, Rento makes use of a satellite that stores and replenishes him with solar energy. He can also perform the Kikai de Hakaider (キカイデハカイダー, Kikai De Hakaidā), Ultimetal Finish (アルティメタルフィニッシュ, Arutimetaru Finisshu), and Full Metal the End (フルメタル・ジ・エンド, Furu Metaru Ji Endo) finishers. Rento was originally part of a group of human-like androids called "Humanoises", who took over the world and hunted humanity to near extinction by 2121. After meeting a group of children, Rento befriended them and defected to defend humanity. Unlike the other future Riders, Rento was modeled after Sougo's robot toy, his sole "companion" during his childhood. Rento Makina is portrayed by Jingi Irie (入江 甚儀, Irie Jingi).
  - Kamen Rider Ginga (仮面ライダーギンガ, Kamen Raidā Ginga): A malevolent extraterrestrial Kamen Rider who transforms via the Ginga Driver (ギンガドライバー, Ginga Doraibā) belt and can perform the Gigantic Ginga (ギガンティックギンガ, Gigantikku Ginga), Dynamite Sunshine (ダイナマイトサンシャイン, Dainamaito Sanshain), and Strike the Planet Nine (ストライクザプラネットナイン, Sutoraiku Za Puranetto Nain) finishers. Born from a space-time disruption, Ginga arrived on Earth in 2019, intending to rule the universe with his unfathomable powers. In response, the Time Riders, the Time Jackers, and Another Kiva temporarily join forces to drive Ginga back to his home timeline. Kamen Rider Ginga is voiced by Tomokazu Sugita (杉田 智和, Sugita Tomokazu).

== Returning characters ==
As a special anniversary series, Kamen Rider Zi-O features cameos from actors of past Kamen Rider series from the Heisei era reprising their roles. While most characters appear in two episodes or the movies, the protagonists of Kamen Rider Decade play a more prominent role as reoccurring side characters directly involved in the series' plotline.

== Spin-off characters ==
- Futaros (フータロス, Fūtarosu): A benevolent Imagin who appears exclusively in the film Kamen Rider Heisei Generations Forever. He forged a contract with Ataru Hisanaga to save his host's brother, Shingo, in the past. To grant Ataru's wish, he brings Sougo, Kamen Rider Build, and some of their friends to his host's world until Tid kidnaps Shingo. When a desperate Ataru tells Futaros to end the contract amidst Tid's invasion, the Imagin travels back in time to January 29, 2000 with Sougo and Ataru to try and save Shingo from Another W. After the Heisei Kamen Riders defeat Tid and the Hisanaga brothers are returned safely, Futaros leaves for parts unknown. Futaros is voiced by Kenichi Takitō (滝藤 賢一, Takitō Ken'ichi).
- Ataru Hisanaga (久永 アタル, Hisanaga Ataru): A high school student and a Heisei Kamen Rider fan from the year 2018 who appears exclusively in the film Kamen Rider Heisei Generations Forever. He forged a contract with Futaros to meet Kamen Riders and leave his reality behind as his parents were more worried about his missing brother, Shingo. When he and Sougo travel back in time while following Futaros to find Shingo however, Ataru is forcibly transformed into Another Den-O. Due to Kamen Rider Den-O's status as a singularity, he and the original DenLiner crew are unaffected by the timeline changes, allowing them to defeat Another Den-O and save Ataru. Ataru Hisanaga is portrayed by Nayuta Fukuzaki (福崎 那由他, Fukuzaki Nayuta).
- Shingo Hisanaga (久永 シンゴ, Hisanaga Shingo): Ataru's 7-year-old older brother from the year 2000 who appears exclusively in the film Kamen Rider Heisei Generations Forever. Due to his status as a singularity, Tid and his Another Riders kidnap Shingo. After escaping the Another Den-Liner on December 3, 2018, he encounters the Kamen Riders and Ataru while being pursued by the Another Riders, who eventually capture him so Tid can seal him. Shingo is later saved by the Heisei Kamen Riders and returned to his own time. Shingo Hisanaga is portrayed by Taiyo Saito (斎藤 汰鷹, Saitō Taiyō).
- Tid (ティード, Tīdo): A Super Time Jacker (スーパータイムジャッカー, Sūpā Taimu Jakkā) capable of brainwashing and manipulating his targets who appears exclusively in Kamen Rider Heisei Generations Forever. Unlike the other Time Jackers, Tid's master plan is to erase the history of all Heisei Kamen Riders and become the ruler of the world. To do this, he creates the Kuuga Another Watch, which allows him to transform into Another Kuuga, so he can abduct and seal Shingo, whose status as a singularity made the boy a potential threat to his plans. After being defeated by Kamen Riders Zi-O and Build, Tid uses his Another Watch on Shingo to absorb him and evolve his Another Rider form into the larger, four-armed Another Ultimate Kuuga (アナザーアルティメットクウガ, Anazā Arutimetto Kūga). However, he is ultimately defeated by the 20 Heisei Kamen Riders, killing him and freeing Shingo. Tid is portrayed by Shunsuke Daitō (大東 駿介, Daitō Shunsuke).
- Iroha Kagura (神蔵 紅芭, Kagura Iroha): Rentarō's younger sister who admires Kamen Rider Shinobi, unaware that he and her older brother are the same person. As she is also the princess of the evil Niji no Hebi clan, Rentarō strives to protect her. Like her brother, she is a ninja proficient in ninjutsu and skilled with using shuriken. Iroha Kagura is portrayed by Asuka Hanamura (華村 あすか, Hanamura Asuka).
- Isamichi Konjō (今生 勇道, Konjō Isamichi): Rentarō's childhood friend and son of the Konjō Company's (今生カンパニー, Konjō Kanpanī) CEO who can transform into Kamen Rider Hattari (仮面ライダーハッタリ, Kamen Raidā Hattari) via the Shuriken Starter in conjunction with the Hattari Driver (ハッタリドライバー, Hattari Doraibā) belt. He harbors affections for Iroha, but after learning she only has eyes for Shinobi he decides to defeat him in order to gain her love. When the Konjō Company hosts a tournament, Isamichi is forced to sabotage Iroha's examination due to said company forbidding nepotism. Later on, he joins forces with Shinobi when the Niji no Hebi target her. Similarly to Shinobi, Hattari uses elemental attacks and a ninjatō in battle, and can summon ninjas to aid him and perform the Fantastic Ninpo (ファンタスティック忍法, Fantasutikku Ninpō) finisher. During the events of the web special Kamen Rider Geats Extra: Kamen Rider Tycoon meets Kamen Rider Shinobi, Isamichi transforms into the Another Rider-like Hattari Yami (ハッタリ 闇). Isamichi Konjō is portrayed by Takuma Zaiki (財木 琢磨, Zaiki Takuma).
- Master Gamano (ガマノ師匠, Gamano-shishō): Rentarō's mentor who selected the youth to become Kamen Rider Shinobi after saving him. Having observed the Kagura family as a frog caricature and despite choosing him, Gamano views Rentarō as expendable to his agenda and leaves to recruit several more ninja Riders. Master Gamano is portrayed by Nobuo Kyo (姜 暢雄, Kyō Nobuo).
- Kagenosuke (影之助): A mysterious ninja from an evil ninja faction known as Niji no Hebi (虹蛇; Rainbow Serpent) who can transform into Yaminin (闇忍) and was responsible for turning Japan into a ninja-based country through the government by 2022. Despite being unaware of Iroha being their group's princess, Kagenosuke develops an affection for her and infiltrates a competition held by the Konjō Company to kidnap her. After being defeated and spared by Kamen Riders Shinobi and Hattari, Kagenosuke promises to return in the future. Kagenosuke is voiced by Masashi Ebara (江原 正士, Ebara Masashi).
- Sara (サラ): A young woman who was accidentally hit by her boyfriend Tatsuya in a car accident and was left hospitalized. After he became Another Ryuki and her soul became trapped in the Mirror World, she sets up a Rider War to find someone to stop him. Before she dies of her injuries, she begs Shinji Kido to save Tatsuya. Sara is portrayed by Mayu Ura (浦 まゆ, Ura Mayu).
- Tatsuya Kanō (加納 達也, Kanō Tatsuya): A young man who inadvertently injured his girlfriend Sara in a car accident. Recognizing his plight, Kamen Rider Odin turns him into Another Ryuki and tasks him with stealing people's souls in order to save Sara. As Another Ryuki, he has similar powers as Another Ryuga and his original template. After learning Sara's soul had become trapped in the Mirror World and that she had set up a Rider War to find someone to stop him, Tatsuya becomes disheartened and realizes all he had done was for naught as he was only hurting Sara further. When she dies, Odin sees no more use for his pawn and sends Tatsuya into a berserker rage before Kamen Rider Zi-O saves the latter. Tatsuya Kanō is portrayed by Shun Ishida (石田 隼, Ishida Shun).
- Mirror World Kamen Riders:
  - Kimura (木村): A young man who became the new Kamen Rider Verde (仮面ライダーベルデ, Kamen Raidā Berude) in Sara's Rider War and sides with Shinji Kido, Miyuki Tezuka, and Ishida. Though he and his team are betrayed by Tezuka and ambushed by Ouja and Zolda, Kimura survives. After learning the truth about Ryuga, Kimura attempts to warn Shinji, but fails to stop Ryuga from possessing Shinji and beating Kimura before leaving him to be eaten by a Mirror Monster horde. Kimura is portrayed by Daichi Yamaguchi (山口 大地, Yamaguchi Daichi).
  - Ishida (石田): A young man who became the new Kamen Rider Imperer (仮面ライダーインペラー, Kamen Raidā Inperā) in Sara's Rider War. He sides with Shinji Kido, Miyuki Tezuka, and Kimura, only to be murdered by a traitorous Tezuka. Ishida is portrayed by Ryo Shinoda (篠田 諒, Shinoda Ryō).
  - Ishibashi (石橋): A young man who became the new Kamen Rider Scissors (仮面ライダーシザース, Kamen Raidā Shizāzu). He sides with Jun Shibaura, Totsuka, and Tezuka before Shibaura and Tezuka silently kill him while having lunch. Ishibashi is portrayed by Ken Nakajima (中島 健, Nakajima Ken).
  - Totsuka (戸塚): A young man who became the new Kamen Rider Tiger (仮面ライダータイガ, Kamen Raidā Taiga) in Sara's Rider War. He sides with Jun Shibaura and Ishibashi before he is killed by Kamen Rider Ouja. Totsuka is portrayed by Ken Sugawara (菅原 健, Sugawara Ken).
  - Unnamed man: A middle-aged man who became the only known version of Kamen Rider Abyss (仮面ライダーアビス, Kamen Raidā Abisu) in the primary Kamen Rider timeline after Sara recruits him for her Rider War. He is killed by Kamen Rider Knight. The unnamed man is portrayed by Kenji Tominaga (富永 研司, Tominaga Kenji) and voiced by Yasunao Sakai (坂井 易直, Sakai Yasunao).
- Oda Nobunaga (織田 信長): An infamous warlord from Japan's Sengoku period whom Sougo idolizes and hoped to emulate. He appears exclusively in Kamen Rider Zi-O the Movie: Over Quartzer. Oda Nobunaga is portrayed by Tomoya Maeno (前野 朋哉, Maeno Tomoya).
- Gyūzō (牛三): A ninja who serves under Nobunaga and appears exclusively in Kamen Rider Zi-O the Movie: Over Quartzer. Gyūzō is portrayed by Jiei Wakabayashi (若林 時英, Wakabayashi Jiei)
- Clara Steinbelt (クララ・スタインベルト, Kurara Sutainberuto): An ancestor of Krim Steinbelt from the Sengoku period who appears exclusively in Kamen Rider Zi-O the Movie: Over Quartzer. Realizing that time had been distorted and after learning of the Quartzers' attempts to kill her, Krim and his ally Kamen Rider Mach ask Sougo and his friends to protect Clara. Clara Steinbelt is portrayed by Eru Aoba (蒼葉 える, Aoba Eru)
- Quartzers (クォーツァー, Kwōtsā): A mysterious group who view themselves as history's overseers and appear primarily in Kamen Rider Zi-O the Movie: Over Quartzer. The three leading Quartzers possess Ziku-Drivers that allow them to transform into analog watch-themed Kamen Riders and utilize Ride Watches based on Kamen Riders whose media aired during the Heisei period, but are recognized as Shōwa era Riders. The minor Quartzers are portrayed by YORI, TOMO, KIMI, U-YEAH, KENZO, and DAICHI of Da Pump.
  - Leader of Quartzer (クォーツァーのリーダー, Kwōtsā no Rīdā): The King of Time and the original future iteration of Sougo Tokiwa, who was known as SOUGO Tokiwa (常磐 SOUGO(ソウゴ), Tokiwa Sōgo), and can transform into Kamen Rider Barlckxs (仮面ライダーバールクス, Kamen Raidā Bārukusu) via the Barlckxs (バールクス, Bārukusu) Ride Watch in conjunction with the Ziku-Driver. While transformed, he utilizes three Ride Watches based on Kamen Rider Black RX, Robo Rider, and Bio Rider, and wields a Revolcane-like sword. Similarly to Ohma Zi-O, Barlckxs can use the power of Ride Watches by pressing their activation buttons and combine Ride Watch powers. He established the conditions to bring about Ohma Zi-O, who he used as a kagemusha to secretly reshape the Heisei era to his liking and prevent Sougo from becoming Grand Zi-O. However, Barlckxs is killed by Zi-O Ohma Form and the Heisei Kamen Riders, negating his influence in Ohma Zi-O's creation. The Leader of Quartzer is portrayed by ISSA of Da Pump.
  - Kagen (カゲン): A high-ranking Quartzer who can transform into Kamen Rider Zonjis (仮面ライダーゾンジス, Kamen Raidā Zonjisu) via the Zonjis (ゾンジス, Zonjisu) Ride Watch in conjunction with the Ziku-Driver. While transformed, he utilizes three Ride Watches based on the last three Shōwa Kamen Riders who debuted in the early Heisei era: Kamen Riders Shin, ZO, and J. Unlike the other Quartzer Riders, Zonjis fights with brute strength and can remove his armored cape to increase his offensive capabilities. He can also use Barlckxs' Robo Rider Ride Watch to fire a barrage of missiles. He is killed by Kamen Rider Zero-One. Kagen is portrayed by Papaya Suzuki (パパイヤ鈴木, Papaiya Suzuki).
  - Jōgen (ジョウゲン): A high-ranking Quartzer member who can transform into Kamen Rider Zamonas (仮面ライダーザモナス, Kamen Raidā Zamonasu) via the Zamonas (ザモナス, Zamonasu) Ride Watch in conjunction with the Ziku-Driver. While transformed, he wields a crossbow, can summon a Castle Doran-themed Time Mazine like Ora, and utilizes three Ride Watches based on the three protagonists of the Shōwa era-themed web series Kamen Rider Amazons: Kamen Riders Amazon Omega, Amazon Alpha, and Amazon Neo. He is killed by Geiz and six of the Heisei Kamen Riders. Jōgen is portrayed by Syuusuke Saito (斉藤 秀翼, Saitō Shūsuke).
- Finis (フィーニス, Fīnisu): A non-binary member of the Time Jackers who seeks to erase all Kamen Riders from history, believing that they are inherently evil, and appears exclusively in Kamen Rider Reiwa: The First Generation. Finis accomplishes their goal by traveling to the World of Zero-One and recruiting the Humagear Will to create an alternate timeline and attract Sougo. Despite absorbing most of Sougo's Rider powers and becoming Another 1, Finis is killed by Kamen Riders Zi-O and Zero-One. As Another 1, Finis possesses a motorcycle-like lower body. After absorbing Geiz's Time Mazine, Another 1 evolves into Another New 1 (アナザー新1号, Anazā Shin Ichigō), acquiring grasshopper-like appendages in place of the motorcycle. Finis is portrayed by Rina Ikoma (生駒 里奈, Ikoma Rina) while Another 1 is voiced by Kōji Ishii (石井 康嗣, Ishii Kōji).
- Misa Kuon (久遠 ミサ, Kuon Misa): A young woman connected to various alternative timeline versions of Sougo who appears exclusively in the Rider Time web series Decade VS Zi-O and Zi-O VS Decade. In the former, Misa is the ghost of a deceased high school girl who participated in the King's Death Game and befriended an android version of Sougo Tokiwa. Before Tsukasa and android Sougo left to fight an alternate version of Ohma Zi-O, Misa passes on to the afterlife in the hopes of meeting Sougo in her reincarnation. In the latter, another iteration of Misa is a student of Hanazono High School and girlfriend of Sougo B. Misa Kuon is portrayed by Rena Takeda (武田 玲奈, Takeda Rena).
