= List of Kamen Rider Amazons characters =

Kamen Rider Amazons (仮面ライダーアマゾンズ, Kamen Raidā Amazonzu) is a 2016 Japanese tokusatsu web series based on the 1974-75 series Kamen Rider Amazon.

== Main characters ==
=== Haruka Mizusawa ===
Haruka Mizusawa (水澤 悠, Mizusawa Haruka) is the third-type Amazon created by Reika Mizusawa, a hybrid created from Reika fusing a sample of her DNA into Amazon Cells. Haruka is kept in seclusion for two years while under deluded into thinking he is human before failing to administer the serum designed to keep his Amazon Cells under control. This resulted in him transforming into his monitor lizard-like berserk Amazon Origin (アマゾン素体, Amazon Sotai) form before receiving the Amazons Driver (アマゾンズドライバー, Amazonzu Doraibā) belt from Nanaha to gain some self-control while transforming into Kamen Rider Amazon Omega (仮面ライダーアマゾンオメガ, Kamen Raidā Amazon Omega; Amazon Rider Omega). Eventually learning the truth, Haruka vows to use his power to protect those who deserve it regardless if they are human or Amazon. Five years later, he uses the Neo Amazons Driver (ネオアマゾンズドライバー, Neo Amazonzu Doraibā) belt that Reika sent to him to enhance himself into Kamen Rider Amazon New Omega (仮面ライダーアマゾンニューオメガ, Kamen Raidā Amazon Nyū Omega; Amazon Rider New Omega).

During the events of Last Judgement, two years after the events of the second season, Haruka is hunted by 4C as he and Jin are the last surviving Amazons. He ends up stumbling on a scheme by Tachibana and Einosuke Mido to use Amazons as livestock. Mortally wounded from his final battle with Jin, Haruka is forced to eat a dying Muku to save him and attempted suicide before an illusion of Mizuki convinces him to keep living as a protector.

Haruka Mizusawa is portrayed by Tom Fujita (藤田 富, Fujita Tomu).

=== Jin Takayama ===
Jin Takayama (鷹山 仁, Takayama Jin) is a former cell biologist at the Nozama Pharmacy who felt that Amazons are his responsibility following the Experiments' escape due to his role in their creation. This motivated him to inject himself with Amazon Cells to become the Amazon Origin form known as the Piranha Amazon (ピラニアアマゾン, Pirania Amazon), using the Amazons Driver belt to stabilize himself and proceed with his cause to exterminate all Amazons as Kamen Rider Amazon Alpha (仮面ライダーアマゾンアルファ, Kamen Raidā Amazon Arufa; Amazon Rider Alpha). (Note: Several merchandise has "Alpha" spelt as "Alfa.") This ultimately placed him at odds with Haruka as he took the full dosage of the anti-Amazon Cell gas during the Tlaloc Incident, causing his cellular makeup to mutate as he continued hunting down the Amazons. Upon learning Nanaha was pregnant with their son Chihiro, Jin resolved to kill him and was partially blinded by Haruka between the events of the first and second seasons. While Jin assumed Nanaha was killed by their son, he learns she evolved into an Amazon and killed her before helping Haruka finish Chihiro off.

During the events of Last Judgement, Jin was captured by 4C and hand over to Einosuke Mido who used his blood to create the Domesticated Amazons while modeling himself into Amazon Neo Alpha. Jin later escapes with Haichi's help, getting his revenge on Mido before he being fatally wounded by Haruka when he attempted to kill the Domesticated Amazons.

Jin Takayama is portrayed by Masashi Taniguchi (谷口 賢志, Taniguchi Masashi).

=== Mizuki Mizusawa ===
Mizuki Mizusawa (水澤 美月, Mizusawa Mizuki) is Reika's daughter and Haruka's half-sister, Mizuki attempting to reason with Haruka to return home with her before accepting that he cannot even if he wanted. Five years later, having joined to fight Haruka should he turn on humanity, she serves as a member of Aoyama team at 4C before transferring to Kurosaki team after her teammates were slaughtered by the Sea Urchin Amazon.

Mizuki Mizusawa is portrayed by Rena Takeda (武田 玲奈, Takeda Rena).

=== Nanaha Izumi ===
Nanaha Izumi (泉 七羽, Izumi Nanaha) is Jin's partner and lover, leaving him upon learning she is pregnant with their son Chihiro out of fear of Jin killing them. She ends up being slaughtered by Chihiro when he first entered his Origin form, only to resurrect into the angelic Jellyfish Amazon (クラゲアマゾン, Kurage Amazon) as a result of her pregnancy. Mamoru intended to use her create more New-Type Amazons, only for her to end up being killed for good by Jin and the Exterminators.

Nanaha Izumi is portrayed by Ayu Higashi (東 亜優, Higashi Ayu).

=== Chihiro ===
Chihiro (千翼) is the first of the New-Type Amazons, the son of Jin and Nanaha who is a hybrid like Haruka. He would ultimately be revealed to be the carrier of the Lysogenic Amazon Cells (溶原性アマゾン細胞, Yōgen-sei Amazon Saibō) that mutated from Jin's DNA, giving him regenerative abilities while his Amazon Origin form is an all-consuming monster with multiple arms with one such limb initially used by Mamoru to create the New-Type Amazons. He uses the Neo Amazons Driver belt to transform into Kamen Rider Amazon Neo (仮面ライダーアマゾンネオ, Kamen Raidā Amazon Neo; Amazon Rider Neo). Chihiro joins C4's Kurosaki squad after falling in love with Iyu Hoshino, seeing her as a means to restore her humanity. But Chihiro's Amazon instincts overwhelm him upon Iyu's death, leading to him being killed by Haruka and Jin with his body completely destroyed to prevent further outbreak.

Chihiro is portrayed by You Maejima (前嶋 曜, Maejima Yō). As a child, he is portrayed by Rui Takahashi (高橋 琉晟, Takahashi Rui) and Shota Taguchi (田口 翔大, Taguchi Shōta).

=== Iyu Hoshino ===
Iyu Hoshino (星埜 イユ, Hoshino Iyu) is a daughter of Hajime Hoshino who was revived as the Crow Amazon (カラスアマゾン, Karasu Amazon), a Sigma-Type Amazon, by 4C after being killed by her father when he mutated into the Vulture Amazon who took out her left eye. As a Sigma-type Amazon, outfitted with a bionic eye, Iyu is essentially an emotionless killing machine unable to register pain and needed to survive on protein while assigned work with Team Kurosaki to detect and exterminate Amazons. When Chihiro joined Team Kurosaki, he gradually humanized Iyu which convinced Tachibana to deem her a failure and has her killed off.

Iyu Hoshino is portrayed by Ayana Shiramoto (白本 彩奈, Shiramoto Ayana). As a child, she is portrayed by Hisui Hatta (八田 久翠, Hatta Hisui) and Sakurako Kamijō (上條 櫻子, Kamijō Sakurako).

=== Hiroki Nagase ===
Hiroki Nagase (長瀬 裕樹, Nagase Hiroki) is the leader of Team X (チームX(キス), Chīmu Kisu; pronounced as "Team Kiss"), a group of teens who became Amazon hunters with Chihiro and set up base in a club owned by Shido. After 4C recaptures Chihiro, Hiroki joins the Nozama Peston Service after one friend became a New-type Amazon that crippled the other while gradually learning the various complications relating to the Amazon. Sometime after Chihiro's death, Hiroki returns to high school

Hiroki Nagase is portrayed by Eiji Akaso (赤楚 衛二, Akaso Eiji).

== Recurring characters ==
=== Nozama Peston Service ===
The Nozama Peston Service (ノザマペストンサービス, Nozama Pesuton Sābisu) is a group created by Nozama Pharmacy to hunt down and kill the Experiment Amazons. To cover their modus operandi, they disguise themselves as a pest extermination group to the public. Following the Tlaloc Incident, Nozama Peston Service reforms after a three-week long disbandment and becomes independent as Nozama Pharmacy suffers severe financial problems.

==== Makoto Shido ====
Makoto Shido (志藤 真, Shidō Makoto) is the leader of the Exterminators who is a former Special Forces member of the Tokyo Metropolitan Police Department, joining the group to pay for his son's treatment.

Makoto Shido is portrayed by Mitsutoshi Shundo (俊藤 光利, Shundō Mitsutoshi).

==== Mamoru ====
Mamoru (マモル) is one of the Experiment Amazon who can transform into the Mole Amazon (モグラアマゾン, Mogura Amazon). He is the most naive member of the group and joined it because he liked hamburgers and the other members, only to leave the group with Haruka after he accidentally gained a taste for human flesh and attacked Misaki. Five years later, he became the rogue Amazons' leader and sought to increase his race's numbers by creating the New-Type Amazons by first using a surviving arm of Chihiro's Amazon Origin form and then Nanaha as her blood was directly infected by her son. He ultimately dies in an attempt to protect Nanaha from his former teammates.

Mamoru is portrayed by Ryota Kobayashi (小林 亮太, Kobayashi Ryōta).

==== Ryusuke Otaki ====
Ryusuke Otaki (大滝 竜介, Ōtaki Ryūsuke) is in charge of analysis and tactics, later revealed to be an Experiment Amazon known as the Dragonfly Amazon (トンボアマゾン, Tonbo Amazon). While Ryusuke attempted to conceal his identity, he ran out of the serum that kept his Amazon instincts in check and killed Jun before being bifurcated by Amazon Omega.

Ryusuke Otaki is portrayed by Ryōma Baba (馬場 良馬, Baba Ryōma).

==== Nozomi Takai ====
Nozomi Takai (高井 望, Takai Nozomi) is the only female member in the Exterminators who mastered martial arts, joining the group to earn money for the children's home she grew up in.

Nozomi Takai is portrayed by Kanon Miyahara (宮原 華音, Miyahara Kanon).

==== Kazuya Misaki ====
Kazuya Misaki (三崎 一也, Misaki Kazuya) is a former con man who joined the Exterminators to pay his debts, especially to a scary syndicate. He is in charge of distracting the general public during the group's Amazon exterminations. His left forearm was later eaten by Mamoru, replacing it with an artificial arm.

Kazuya Misaki is portrayed by Katsuya (勝也).

==== Kota Fukuda ====
Kota Fukuda (福田 耕太, Fukuda Kōta), nicknamed "Fuku" by the group, is responsible for logistical support. He once worked under Shido at the Special Forces of the police, following him into Exterminators to pay the care cost for his mother who has dementia. This played in Fukuda joining 4C's Kurosaki squad, putting him at odds with his former allies until he was forced to kill his mother when she ended up becoming a New-Type Amazon.

Kota Fukuda is portrayed by Kazuya Tanabe (田邊 和也, Tanabe Kazuya).

==== Jun Maehara ====
Jun Maehara (前原 淳, Maehara Jun) is an expert hacker of the NPS who was killed by the Dragonfly Amazon, only to be revived by Yugo Tachibana as the first Sigma-Type Amazon and uses the Amazons Driver belt to transform into Kamen Rider Amazon Sigma (仮面ライダーアマゾンシグマ, Kamen Raidā Amazon Shiguma; Amazon Rider Sigma). But process altered Jun's mind and turned him into an evil sociopath, later killed by Mamoru after receiving major damage from fighting both Haruka and Jin at once.

Jun Maehara is portrayed by Hiroshi Asahina (朝日奈 寛, Asahina Hiroshi).

=== Nozama Pharmacy ===
Nozama Pharmacy (野座間製薬株式会社, Nozama Seiyaku Kabushikigaisha) is a pharmaceutical company that has been conducting extensive research to develop a microscopic artificial life form called Amazon Cells (アマゾン細胞, Amazon Saibō), implied by Jin to be for military applications. When the Experimental Amazons they created escaped two years prior due to Tenjou orchestrating an explosion in the testing facility, the company quietly attempts to resolve the matter by enlisting the Peston Service to track down any active Amazon and exterminate. Following the Tlaloc Incident, Nozama Pharmacy suffered a massive layoffs from financing 4C along with reparations for victims or surviving families of Amazon attacks. Notably, Nozama written in the Latin alphabet is "Amazon" backwards.

==== Takaaki Tenjo ====
Takaaki Tenjo (天条 隆顕, Tenjō Takaaki) is the corrupt chairman of Nozama Pharmacy whose obsession with Amazon Cells renders him apathic to the lives of others or even his own, revealed to have masterminded the Experimental Amazons' release into the city to observe the lifeforms' full potential regardless of who they kill. He later appears during the events of season two observe Chihiro's battle against 4C.

Takaaki Tenjo is portrayed by Takashi Fujiki (藤木 孝, Fujiki Takashi).

==== Reika Mizusawa ====
Reika Mizusawa (水澤 令華, Mizusawa Reika) is the chief officer of the Nozama Pharmacy's Special R/D department and overseer of the Amazon Project. She is mother to both Mizuki and Haruka, the latter by Reika synthesizing her own DNA into Amazon Cells. She later developed Operation Tlaloc as a means to eliminate two thirds of the Amazon population. During the events of season two, sending Kanou to keep tabs on Tachibana and secretly funding the Nozama Peston Service, Reika intended to harvest Chihiro's genetic sample before realizing he is too great a risk to be kept alive.

Reika Mizusawa is portrayed by Takako Katou (加藤 貴子, Katō Takako).

==== Shogo Kanou ====
Shogo Kanou (加納 省吾, Kanō Shōgo) is Reika's secretary who Tachibana manipulated into giving him an Amazons Driver. Five years later, serving the man's right hand, Kanou is sent by Reika to spy on Tachibana as a Nozama Pharmacy representative before he was later killed by Chihiro in his Origin Form.

Shogo Kanou is portrayed by Toshimasa Komatsu (小松 利昌, Komatsu Toshimasa).

==== Sawaguchi ====
Sawaguchi (沢口) is a researcher of the Special Research and Development Headquarters who engages in Operation Tlaloc at Reika's behest.

Sawaguchi is portrayed by Akiyoshi Shibata (柴田 明良, Shibata Akiyoshi).

=== 4C ===
Competitive Creatures Control Center (特定有害生物対策センター, Tokutei Yūgai Seibutsu Taisaku Sentā), often abbreviated to 4C, is the organization formed as a collaboration between the Nozama Pharmacy and the government after the downfall of the company due to the Amazon scandal.

==== Yugo Tachibana ====
Yugo Tachibana (橘 雄悟, Tachibana Yūgo) is the Chief of 4C, previously chief officer of the Nozama Pharmacy's international marketing branch, who is adamant of destroying what he cannot control. He facilitated the creation of the Sigma-Type Amazons, using the corpse of Jun Maehara and the Amazons Driver to perfect his process. After the Nozama Pharmacy collapsed, Tachibana joined 4C and rose up the ranks while converting Iyu Hoshino into a Sigma Amazon. He later be heavily crippled by Chihiro when he goes berserk while in his Amazon Origin form, ordering Iyu's death for regaining her humanity and deciding to commence the Amazon Livestock Project to rectify Japan's food crisis with the Domesticated Amazons.

Yugo Tachibana is portrayed by Yuu Kamio (神尾 佑, Kamio Yū).

==== Takeshi Kurosaki ====
Takeshi Kurosaki (黒崎 武, Kurosaki Takeshi) is an Amazon extermination squad leader, a cynical man who has a justified yet immense hatred towards Amazons with trust issues towards like Fukuda as he believes that any sympathy towards Amazons is a weakness yet ironically showed little concern for Iyu. In the movie epilogue Last Judgement, Kurosaki sides with Nozama to remove Tachibana from command upon learning of the man growing new Amazons for his own agenda.

Takeshi Kurosaki is portrayed by Kōta Miura (三浦 孝太, Miura Kōta).

==== Ichiro Fudamori ====
Ichiro Fudamori (札森 一郎, Fudamori Ichirō) is a government official who serves as Team Kurosaki's analyser.

Ichiro Fudamori is portrayed by Yoshito Momiki (籾木 芳仁, Momiki Yoshito).

=== Hajime Hoshino ===
Hajime Hoshino (星埜 始, Hoshino Hajime) is a university professor specializing in cell biology who is Iyu's father and Jin's mentor, approached by the latter when Nanaha is pregnant. Helping Nanaha go into hiding with Haruka, who became his assistant, Hajime is confronted by Jin and ends up being infected with a blood sample from Chihiro. This resulted with Hajime mutating into the New-Type Amazon Vulture Amazon (ハゲタカアマゾン, Hagetaka Amazon) on his birthday, slaughtering his family before being killed by Haruka who honored the man's wish to die to maintain whatever humanity he had left.

Hajime Hoshino is portrayed by Jun Yamasaki (山崎 潤, Yamasaki Jun).

=== Takumi Yamashita ===
Takumi Yamashita (山下 琢己, Yamashita Takumi) is a member of Team X who ends up mutating into the Baboon Amazon (ヒヒアマゾン, Hihi Amazon) and killed by Shido.

Takumi Yamashita is portrayed by Kairi Miura (三浦 海里, Miura Kairi).

=== Kenta Kitamura ===
Kenta Kitamura (北村 健太, Kitamura Kenta) is a member of Team X who was amputated his right leg after being attacked by the Baboon Amazon.

Kenta Kitamura is portrayed by Shohei Domoto (堂本 翔平, Dōmoto Shōhei).

=== Amazons ===
The Amazons (アマゾン, Amazon) are monsters created by Nozama Pharmacy-based from a virus-size artificial lifeforms called Amazon Cells. Due to the Amazon Cells need for human-based proteins to maintain or enhance their strength, an Amazon is usually driven by instinct to hunt humans or cannibalize the other Amazons in extreme cases.

==== Experiment Amazons ====
Disparagingly referred by the Exterminators as "bugs" (害虫, Gaichū), these 4,000 Amazons are artificial humanoids created by the Nozama Pharmacy and were released into the city two years prior to the events of the series secretly by Takaaki Tenjo to see their full potential in a chaotic environment. The Experiment Amazons are outfitted with Amazons Registers to supply them with a limited supply of drug-based depressant to quell the Amazon Cells, allowing them to blend into human society and feed like regular humans. However, once the serum runs out, an Amazon would usually be consumed by its instinct to devour humans. Also the Amazons Register double as tracking devices, due to transformed Amazon is beyond the serum's potency and would need to be killed. But Experiment Amazons that suffered traumatic experience are able to subvert their man-eating instincts with most are incapable of directly hurting humans unprovoked. While Haruka attempted to lead the remaining thousand to a new place to exist in peace following Operation Tlaloc, the Experiment Amazons eventually died out due to Jin hunting them down despite their attempt to fight back by creating the New-Type Amazons to fight for them.

- Spider Amazon (クモアマゾン, Kumo Amazon):
- Bat Amazon (コウモリアマゾン, Kōmori Amazon):
- Queen Ant Amazon (女王アリアマゾン, Joō Ari Amazon): An Amazon who assumed the identity of Kukizono (久木園), residing in an apartment complex where she feed on human servicemen that she tricked into her room. She would later be killed by Amazon Omega bifurcating her.
- Soldier Ant Amazons (兵隊アリアマゾン, Heitai Ari Amazon): An army of 181 Amazons that live with Kukizono, all having been in a dormant state until they sensed their queen was attacked by Amazon Omega and the Nozama Peston Service. The Soldier Ants were all eventually killed when exposed to an early form of the gas later used in Operation Tlaloc.
- Butterfly Amazon (蝶アマゾン, Chō Amazon): Amazons that use their antennae as tendrils, their larval stage able to trap their victim in silk to suck out their body fluids. The first Butterfly Amazon seen is a bus driver that partially awakened kidnapping passengers to feed a fully awakened Butterfly Amazon larva, which later molted into a complete Imago form. Both Butterfly Amazons were killed by Amazon Omega.
- Shrike Amazon (モズアマゾン, Mozu Amazon): Amazons whose behavior pattern involved placing people in high places, leaving them only unconscious before feeding. Haruka fails to dispatch one Shrike Amazon during his first official mission with the Nozama Peston Service.
  - Hajime Koyama (小山 ハジメ, Koyama Hajime): A young man whose Amazon nature awakened when he found the victim of a murderer.
- Crab Amazon (カニアマゾン, Kani Amazon): An Amazon that assumed the identity of a chef who killed and fed humans to fellow unawakened Amazons to keep themselves from being consumed by their instincts. However, the Nozama Peston group learn of their activities with the Crab Amazon killed while all but one of his clients killed off by the perfected gas.
- Wasp Amazon (ハチアマゾン, Hachi Amazon): An Amazon who assumed the identity of Mika (ミカ), a woman who wanted to live in peace. She was originally one of the Crab Amazon's clients before the Nozama Peston Service Extermination Team raids the restaurant. While subjected to the Tlaloc gas, she managed to survive and escape into the sewers where other Amazons are hiding. But after encountering Haruka a second time, she ends up awakening into her Amazon form and attempts to eat Mizuki with a reluctant Amazon Omega forced to kill her.

==== New-Type Amazons ====
During the events of the second season, Mamoru used the Lysogenic Amazon Cells contained in one of the severed arms of Chihiro to rebuild the Amazons' numbers by place it in the water used by Aroma Ozone water dispensers, mutating those infected from drinking it into New-Type Amazons. When the limb was removed, Mamoru resorts to using Nanaha Izumi's altered DNA to continue. Like the Experiment Amazons, though having a higher variety of forms and unable to absorb whatever they are wearing at time, the New-Types would end up becoming man-eating monsters once the infection takes hold and compels them to feed. Unlike the Experiment Amazons that turn into puddles of black slime upon death, New-Type Amazons petrify.

- Leopard Amazon (ヒョウアマゾン, Hyō Amazon): An Amazon that mutated from a male police officer, while the second mutated from a male demolition worker.
- Stag Beetle Amazon (クワガタアマゾン, Kuwagata Amazon): An Amazon that mutated from a bride.
- Mantis Amazon (カマキリアマゾン, Kamakiri Amazon): An Amazon that mutated from a female wedding attendant, while the second mutated from a male demolition worker.
- Rhinoceros Amazon (サイアマゾン, Sai Amazon): An Amazon that mutated from a female wedding attendant, while the second mutated from a male demolition worker.
- Snake Amazon (ヘビアマゾン, Hebi Amazon): The first Snake Amazon mutated from a female wedding attendant, while the second mutated from a sniper who accidentally ingested Chihiro's blood.
- Sea Urchin Amazon (ウニアマゾン, Uni Amazon): An Amazon that mutated from a male office worker.
- Elephant Amazon (ゾウアマゾン, Zō Amazon): An Amazon that mutated from a male doctor.
- Weevil Amazon (ゾウムシアマゾン, Zōmushi Amazon): An Amazon that mutated from a nurse.
- Rose Amazon (バラアマゾン, Bara Amazon): An Amazon that mutated from a young man named Shuya (周也, Shūya).

== Spin-off characters ==
=== Einosuke Mido ===
Einosuke Mido (御堂 英之助, Midō Einosuke) is a biologist and the director of the Kiriko Seien (切子聖園), a children's home established by 4C to raise the Domesticated Amazons as food for humans. He uses the Militant Amazons Register (ミリタントアマゾンズレジスター, Miritanto Amazonzu Rejisutā) armlet to transform into Kamen Rider Amazon Neo Alpha (仮面ライダーアマゾンネオアルファ, Kamen Raidā Amazon Neo Arufa), and the Neo Amazons Driver belt is used to produce weapons and perform finishers.

Einosuke Mido is portrayed by Nobuo Kyo (姜 暢雄, Kyō Nobuo).

=== Domesticated Amazons ===
Amazons created by Einosuke Mido using Jin's cells as part of 4C's alternative solution to Japan's food crisis, raised by Mido to be given to people for consumption.

- Squirrel Amazon (リスアマゾン, Risu Amazon): An Amazon called Muku (ムク), who befriended Haruka and Mizuki during their stay in the Kiriko Seien. Portrayed by Seina Kokufuda (国府田 聖那, Kokufuda Seina).
- Buffalo Amazon (バッファローアマゾン, Baffarō Amazon):
- Shark Amazon (サメアマゾン, Same Amazon):
- Sea Snake Amazon (ウミヘビアマゾン, Umihebi Amazon): An Amazon called Mina (ミナ).
- Tiger Amazon (トラアマゾン, Tora Amazon): An Amazon called Sango (サンゴ).
- Snapping Turtle Amazon (カミツキガメアマゾン, Kamitsukigame Amazon): An Amazon called Yoji (ヨージ, Yōji).
