= Ryōsuke Miura =

Japanese actor

- 三浦 涼介
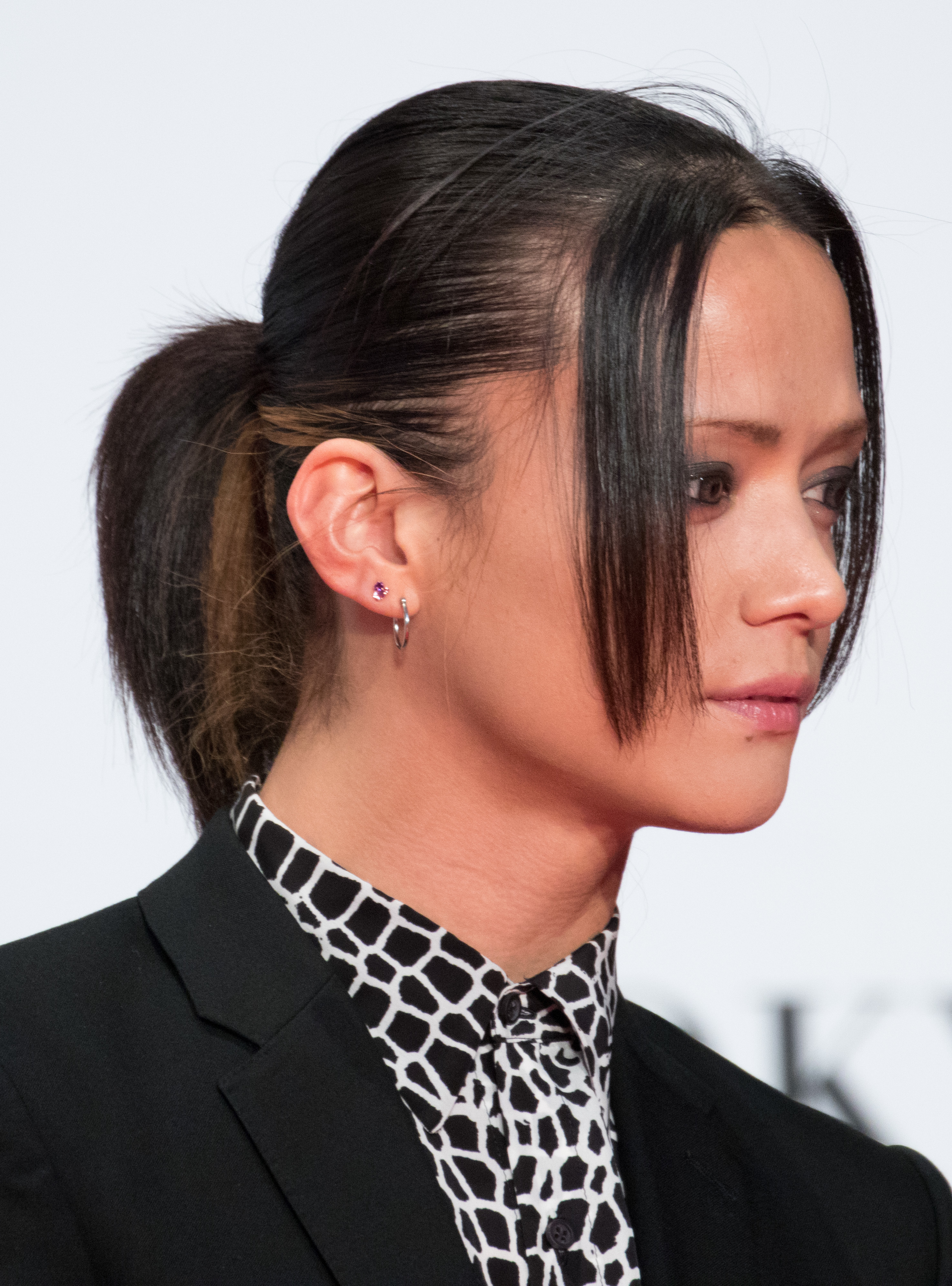
- Miura at the Tokyo International Film Festival in 2016
- Born: February 16, 1987 (age 39); Tokyo, Japan
- Occupations: Actor; singer
- Years active: 2002–present
- Agent: Jedeconn
- Parent: Kōichi Miura (father) Arisu Jun (mother)
- Relatives: Kōta Miura (brother)
- Website: miura-ryosuke.com

Ryōsuke Miura (三浦 涼介, Miura Ryōsuke; born 16 February 1987) is a Japanese actor who plays the role of Ankh/Shingo Izumi in Kamen Rider OOO. He is the third son of actor Kōichi Miura and idol Arisu Jun; he has an older brother who is also an actor: Kōta Miura. His acting debut was in the 2002 movie Ogya. In January 2012, Miura reprise his role in Super Hero Taisen (2012), In February 2012, Miura has pulled out from Super Hero Taisen, five years later Miura reprise his role in Kamen Rider Heisei Generation FINAL (2017), In July 2012, he made his singing debut with the single "Natsu dayo Honey!!" (Honey, It's summer). ♡

== Filmography ==
=== TV series ===
Year	Title	Role	Other notes
2002	3 nen B gumi Kinpachi Sensei		Season 6
2003	Kochira Hon Ikegami Sho		Season 2
2003	Lion Sensei	Koichi Abe	
2005	Gokusen	Ryosuke Muto	Season 2
2005	Chousei Kantai Sazer-X	Kane Lucano/Beetle Sazer	Episodes 1-38
2007	Delicious Gakuin	Matthew Perrier	
2007	Joshi Ana Icchokusen!	Ikeda Teppei	
2008	Nodame Cantabile SP	Roland Chevalier	
2008	Tokyo Ghost Trip	Hisamoto Ichiya	
2008	Shibatora	Takeshi Kanazawa	
2009	Kamen Rider Decade	Momose/Tiger Orphnoch	Episodes 10–11
2009	Meitantei no Okite	Miyamoto Osamu	Episode 2
2009	Boss	Takeda Hiroyuki	Episodes 3–4
2010	Kamen Rider OOO	Ankh, Shingo Izumi	Dual role
2010	Keibuho Yabe Kenzo	Kogoro Akuchi	Episode 8
2013	Keibuho Yabe Kenzo 2	Kogoro Akuchi	Episode 7
2014	Watashi no kirai na Tantei	Tatsumi Chiaki	Episode 5
2020	Talio	Hiroki Zaitsu	

=== Films ===
Year	Title	Role	Other notes
2002	Ogya	Kujimaru	
2003	Yume Oikakete		
2006	Chousei Kantai Sazer-X The Movie	Kane Lucano	
2008	Real Onigokko	Makoto Suzuki	
2008	Alldays ni Chome no Asahi	Masao	
2008	Bokura no Houteishiki	Yokomatsu	
2009	Kanna-san Daiseikō Desu!	Suzuki	
2010	Beck	Miyazawa	
2010	Kamen Rider × Kamen Rider OOO & W Featuring Skull: Movie War Core	Ankh, Shingo Izumi	Dual role
2011	OOO, Den-O, All Riders: Let's Go Kamen Riders	Ankh, Shingo Izumi	Dual role
2011	Kamen Rider OOO Wonderful : The Shogun and the 21 Core Medals	Ankh, Shingo Izumi	Dual role
2011	Kamen Rider × Kamen Rider Fourze & OOO: Movie War Mega Max	Ankh	
2012	Piece ~Fragments of a Memory~	Rei	
2013	Cult	Neo	
2014	Rurouni Kenshin: Kyoto Inferno	Sawagejo Cho	
2017	Kamen Rider Heisei Generations Final: Build & Ex-Aid with Legend Rider	Ankh	
2021	Rurouni Kenshin: The Final	Sawagejo Cho	
2022	Kamen Rider OOO The 10th Core Medal Resurrection	Ankh	

=== Theaters and stage ===
- Sutā Tanjō (2004)
- Bambino(2006)
- Bambino+(2006)
- Bambino.2(2007)
- Bambino+ in Yokohama (2007)
- Bambino+ in apple (2008)
- Bambino.3&+ (2009)
- Bambino. Final! (2012)
- Boku no Yotsuya kaidan (2012)
- Never Let me Go (2014) (Apr 29 to May 15)
- The Shawshank Redemption (December 2014)
- Verona no ni shinshi (2014)
- Tegami (2016)
- Kuroshitsuji: Noah's Ark Circus (2016)
- Kumikyoku Vol.14 "Douka yami wo, Kimi ni" (2017)
- Grand Guignol (2017)
- Shitsunawa reta ai no iro (2017)
- 1789 -Bastille no Koibitotachi- (2018)
- Romantic Act "Rurouni Kenshin" (2018)
- Romeo & Juliette (2019)
- Elisabeth (2019)
- Love's Labour's Lost (2019)
- Mary Stuart (2020)

=== Single ===
- Natsu dayo HONEY!! - July 11, 2012 - Single debut
1. Natsu dayo HONEY!!
2. MissTerious
3. Ashita he no SPEED
- Kimi he no X'mas Song - November 21, 2012 ("Anata no tame ni" the main theme song for PIECE: Kioku no Kakera movie)
1. Kimi he no X'mas Song
2. Anata no tame ni
3. Dare yori kimi ni chikai basho de
- escape - May 22, 2013
1. escape
2. Bad Dream
3. All the way
- PEARL/GET UP - February 11, 2015
1. PEARL
2. GET UP

=== Digital Single ===
- JUSTICE ~tada kimi no subete wo mitsumeteiru~ - September 7, 2016

=== Mini Single ===
- Drive you crazy / Beep Beep - December 17, 2011

=== Soundtrack Movie ===
1. Time Judged All - (Kamen Rider OOO ft. Watanabe Shu) - July 27, 2011
2. Te wo tsunagou~Matsuken × Kamen Rider Samba~ (Kamen Rider OOO ft. Matsudaira Ken & Watanabe Shu) - August 3, 2011
3. Hoshikuzu Kyoudai no densetsu (The Legend of The Stardust Brothers) - October 4, 2017
4. Hoshikage no Baraddo (Ballad of the Shadow Star) - January 10, 2018

=== Album ===
- Ryosuke Miura Summer Live 2012 CD - August 13, 2014. Included in the DVD edition with a collection of singles:
1. DRIVE YOU CRAZY
2. FLASHLIGHT
3. IN THE RAIN
4. LOVE LOVE LOVE
5. SO IN LOVE
6. TRUST ME
7. BEEP BEEP
8. THE WAY WE LOST
9. Drive You Crazy -Instrumental-
10. FLASHLIGHT -Instrumental-
11. In the Rain -Instrumental-
12. LOVE LOVE LOVE -Instrumental-
13. So in love -Instrumental-
14. Trust me -Instrumental-
15. BEEP BEEP -Instrumental-
16. The way we lost -Instrumental-
- Color - December 7, 2016
1. JUSTICE ~tada kimi no subete wo mitsumeteiru~
2. Shimauma
3. Dancing in the Air
4. Time Rocket
5. Yumebana

=== DVD ===
- Bitter, milky taste (March 19, 2008, Pony Canyon )
- From LA with LOVE Ryosuke Miura (January 25, 2013, Japan time)
- Ryosuke Miura Summer Live 2012 (August 13, 2014, Avex Marketing)
