= Arisu Jun =

Japanese actress and singer (1953–2019)

- 純 アリス
- Born: Mariko Kubo (久保 雅璃子, Kubo Mariko); 20 June 1953; Hiroshima Prefecture, Japan
- Died: 12 July 2019 (aged 66); Tokyo, Japan
- Other names: Mari Tsuzumi (津々見 マリ, Tsuzumi Mari)
- Occupation: Actress
- Years active: 1972–2019
- Agent: Tokyo Kid Brothers
- Spouse: Kōichi Miura (m. 1980; died 2019)
- Children: 3 (including Kōta Miura and Ryōsuke Miura)

Mariko Miura (三浦 雅璃子, Miura Mariko; 20 June 1953 - 12 July 2019), better known under the stage name Arisu Jun (純 アリス, Jun Arisu), was a Japanese actress and singer, who was best known for starring in Mama wa Rival and Saramumu, and for her appearances in teleshopping alongside her husband Kōichi Miura.

== Early life and career ==
Arisu Jun, who was from Kure, Hiroshima, was born Mariko Kubo (久保 雅璃子, Kubo Mariko) on 20 June 1953 in Hiroshima Prefecture. She was the daughter of a New Zealand Defence Force soldier who was stationed in Japan after World War II and a Japanese mother. Her parents divorced when she was two years old; her father returned to New Zealand, while her mother moved to Tokyo. She was later raised by her grandmother in Kobe, and during her second year of junior high school, she moved to Tokyo where she lived with her aunt. She had always grown up without knowing what to call home. Arisu was of New Zealand nationality as of 1980.

She was scouted while attending school at Tokyo College of Music High School, and she became a fashion model under the stage name of Mari Tsuzumi (津々見 マリ, Tsuzumi Mari), appearing in fashion magazines such as Soen.

Her acting career began with Mama wa Rival, which aired on TBS between 4 October 1972 and 26 September 1973. Arisu Jun's stage name was derived by Mamoru Sasaki, who was the drama's scriptwriter, from the novel Alice's Adventures in Wonderland and from the Japanese word for pure, seijun (清純). She later appeared in two episodes of the NTV drama Taiyō ni Hoero! that aired on 6 and 13 October of the same year. At the age of 21, she later became a member of the Tokyo Kid Brothers troupe. In February 1979, she also appeared in the TV Asahi musical Saramumu alongside Kyōhei Shibata and his future husband Koichi Miura.

Several of the shows she appeared in include the TV Tokyo shows Asa wa Tanoshiku!, Morning Teleshop, Okaimono Town, Sandy Okaidoku Jōhō. She also appeared in the TV Asahi shows BUY2, GETV, Omezame Shop, Tokusen Ichibanmachi Another show she appeared in, POSHLET WORLD, aired on Nippon TV on 26 August 2000.

Her album Hanamoyō (花模様, Hanamoyō), was released by Nayutawave Records on 12 September 2007.

== Personal life ==
In 1980, she married actor Kōichi Miura, who was also a member of the Tokyo Kid Brothers troupe. After their marriage, the couple appeared together as teleshopping presenters. She and Kōichi later had three children, including actors Kōta Miura and Ryōsuke Miura.

=== Death ===
Jun died of cancer in a Tokyo hospital on 12 July 2019.
