= Toei Hero Next =

Toei Hero Next is a series of Japanese movies created and produced by Toei Company.

== Description ==
Started in 2012, Toei Hero Next gave the cast of recently aired Toei Tokusatsu shows (Kamen Rider and Super Sentai) a chance to work together again on a completely different project and showcase the actors acting skills.

== Movies ==
=== Piece ~Fragments of a Memory~ Toei Hero Next #1 ===
Piece ~Fragments of a Memory~ PIECE～記憶の欠片～
- Directed by: Ten Shimoyama
- Written by: Riku Sanjo
- Starring: Shu Watanabe; Ryosuke Miura
- Music by: Kiyoshi Yoshikawa
- Production company: Toei Company
- Release date: September 1, 2012
- Running time: 92 minutes
- Country: Japan

This is the first installment of the Toei Hero Next series that was released on September 1, 2012. It features actors Shu Watanabe and Ryosuke Miura from Kamen Rider OOO.

=== My Future Of Being Executed Toei Hero Next #2 ===
My Future Of Being Executed ぼくが処刑される未来
- Directed by: Kazuya Konaka
- Written by: Keiichi Hasegawa
- Produced by: Kazuhiro Takahashi; Norisato Omori; Hidetomo Sugaya
- Starring: Sota Fukushi; Megumi Seki; Ryo Yoshizawa
- Music by: Koji Endo
- Production company: Toei Company
- Release date: November 23, 2012
- Running time: 88 minutes
- Country: Japan

The second installment of Toei Hero Next series that was released on November 23, 2012. It feature actors Sota Fukushi and Ryo Yoshizawa from Kamen Rider Fourze.

=== Love Gear Toei Hero Next #3 ===
Love Gear 恋する歯車
- Directed by: Kenji Nakanishi
- Written by: Junya Ikegami
- Starring: Ryota Ozawa; Junya Ikeda; Kazuki Shimizu; Kurokawa Tomoka
- Music by: Shogo Kaida
- Production company: Toei Company
- Release date: February 9, 2013
- Running time: 107 minutes
- Country: Japan

The third installment of the Toei Hero Next series that was released on February 9, 2013. It feature actors Ryota Ozawa, Junya Ikeda, and Kazuki Shimizu from Kaizoku Sentai Gokaiger.

=== We're the Bounty Hunter Troupe Toei Hero Next #4 ===
We're the Bounty Hunter Troupe 俺たち賞金稼ぎ団
- Directed by: Koichi Sakamoto
- Written by: Yoshifumi Sakai; Makoto Ueda (supervision)
- Starring: Ryo Ryusei; Syuusuke Saito; Yamato Kinjo; Akihisa Shiono; Ayuri Konno; Atsushi Maruyama
- Cinematography: Shuji Momose
- Music by: Yasuhiro Misawa
- Production companies: Toei; Toei Video; Kinoshita Group; Toei AG
- Distributed by: Toei Video (DVD)
- Release date: May 10, 2014
- Running time: 100 minutes
- Country: Japan

The fourth installment of the Toei Hero Next series that was released on June 7, 2014. It feature actors Ryo Ryusei, Syuusuke Saito, Yamato Kinjo, Akihisa Shiono, Ayuri Konno, and Atsushi Maruyama from Zyuden Sentai Kyoryuger.
