= Kōta Miura =

Japanese actor (born 1984)

- 三浦 孝太
- Born: 14 April 1984 (age 41); Tokyo, Japan
- Years active: 1993–2021
- Notable work: California Monogatari (2008)
- Parents: Kōichi Miura (father); Arisu Jun (mother)
- Relatives: Ryōsuke Miura (younger brother)
- Website: Official website

Kōta Miura (三浦 孝太, Miura Kōta; born 14 April 1984) is a Japanese actor. Born in Tokyo, he graduated from the Kanto International Senior High School Foreign Languages English Course. He has acted in television drama series, feature films, web series and theatre productions, and is represented with the agency Anthem.

== Personal life, biography ==
He was born as the second son of actors Koichi Miura and Arisu Jun. His older brother is a lecturer at a cram school, and his younger brother is Ryōsuke Miura, who is also an actor. He retired from acting in 2021 during the COVID-19 pandemic and joined a cleaning business.

== Filmography ==
=== TV dramas ===
- Saturday Drama Chizuru Katsura Shinsatsu Nichiroku Episode 13, Final Episode (18, 25 Dec 2010, NHK) – as Shinichiro Ibata
- Japan-Korea collaborative production drama Bad Guy (Jun 2010, SBS/4–15 Sep 2011, NHK BS Premium) – as Masaru
- Taiga drama Gunshi Kanbei (Jan–Dec 2014. NHK) – as Mōri Terumoto
- Senryoku-gai Sōsa-kan Episode 7 (22 Feb 2014, NTV) – as Gen Sudo

=== Films ===
- The Final Judgement (released Jun 2012, Nikkatsu) – as Seigo Washio
- Kamen Rider Amazons the Movie: The Last Judgement (scheduled 19 May 2018, Toei Company) – as Takeshi Kurosaki

=== Web dramas ===
- Kamen Rider Amazons (Apr 2017, Amazon Prime Video) – as Takeshi Kurosaki

=== Stage ===
- abbey (Nov 2007, K Dash)
- California Monogatari (Original work: Akimi Yoshida, Feb 2008, Studio Life)
- The Dishwashers (Apr 2008, Show Biz Planning) – as Burroughs
- Yagyuu Jūbee (Jun 2008, Waki-Gumi)
- Kuramatengu (Sep 2008, Waki-Gumi)
- Match Sale of Alice in Wonderland (Nov 2008)
- The Family Kizuna (Dec 2008, Waki-Gumi)
- Ryū Kotarō―Hana Butai― (Apr 2009)
- Dirty Money (Jul 2009)
- Nagareru Kumoyo―DJ kara Tokkōtai e Ai o Komete― (Sep 2009)
- Genroku Music Play Kuro Tsubaki (16–24 Jul 2011, Ikebukuro Owl Spot)

=== Advertisements ===
- Procter & Gamble Muse (as part of the Koichi Miura & Alice Jun Family) (1993)
