= Atsushi Maruyama (actor) =

Japanese actor from the Tokyo Metropolis (born 1983)

- 丸山 敦史
- Born: 11 June 1983 (age 42); Tokyo, Japan
- Occupation: Actor
- Years active: 2007 - present
- Height: 182 cm (6 ft 0 in)

Atsushi Maruyama (丸山 敦史, Maruyama Atsushi; born June 11, 1983) is a Japanese actor from Tokyo best known for his portrayal Utsusemimaru/Kyoryu Gold in the 2013 Super Sentai TV series Zyuden Sentai Kyoryuger.

== Biography ==
In 2007, he made his debut as Shien in the TV drama "Kojiro of the Fuma clan". He later played the same role in the stage version.

In September 2008, he appeared in the stage play "Saiyuki Kagekiden -Go to the West-" as Sha Gojo. On July 24, 2009, he moved from Ameba Blog to Diamond Blog.

In 2013, he appeared in the TV drama Zyuden Sentai Kyoryuger as Utsusemimaru/Kyoryu Gold. He later played Uppy, Utsusemimaru's great-great grandson In Zyuden Sentai Kyoryuger: 100 YEARS AFTER.

On July 13, 2015, he moved from Diamond Blog to Ameba Blog.

From June 2017 to October 2018, he served as an MC on the Niconico Live Broadcasting "Showa no Nioi" channel with Yamato Kinjo, who co-starred with him in Kyoryuger.

On October 31, 2021, he announced on Twitter that he had left Burning Production, where he had been affiliated for many years.

== Personal life ==
Maruyama has teaching licenses for social studies (middle school level) and Japanese history (high school level).

== Filmography ==
=== Television ===
Year	Title	Role	Network	Other notes
2007	Fūma no Kojirō	Shien	Tokyo MX	
2008	Saikon Icchokusen!	Ikenami Shougo	TBS, etc.	Episode 26
2009	Übermensch "UTADA"	Aoyama Shinji	WOWOW	
2009	Urami-ya Honpo REBOOT	Tamaru Takashi	TV Tokyo	Episodes 7 and 8
2010	Ongoing Investigations of the Metropolitan Police Department	Wakaki	TV Asahi	Episode 4
2011	Legend of the Sengoku Gale: The Two Strategists Who Enabled Hideyoshi to Seize Rule of Japan	Amago Katsuhisa	TV Tokyo	
2011	Misaki Number One!	Black Suit	Nippon TV	Episode 1
2011	Requirements for a Divorce	Mizushima Atsushi	Fuji TV	
2011	UNFAIR the special ~ double meaning nijuu teigi ~	Detective Sakamoto Koushi	Fuji TV	
2011	Akujo-tachi no Mesu	Nurse (Maruyama Kazuya)	Fuji TV	
2012	Otoshi no Oni: Detective Sawa Chinatsu	Tsujii Kentarou	TV Tokyo	
2012	Inspector Totsugawa Series 47 "Atami Yugawara Murder Case"	Nagatomo Susumu	TBS	
2013	UNFAIR spin off ~ double meaning series ~ Yes or No?	Detective Sakamoto Koushi	Fuji TV	
2013	Zyuden Sentai Kyoryuger	Utsusemimaru/Kyoryu Gold (voice)	TV Asahi	Main role
2014	Alumni ~ Three Times in Love ~	HIRO (Nagase Hiroto)	TBS	
2017	Cecile's Plot	Manager	Fuji TV	

=== Film ===
Year	Title	Role	Other notes
2010	Sakura, Sakura ~ The Life of Samurai Chemist Takamine Joukichi	Uenaka Keizou	
2013	Kamen Rider × Super Sentai × Space Sheriff: Super Hero Taisen Z	Kyoryu Gold	Voice role, cameo
2013	Zyuden Sentai Kyoryuger: Gaburincho of Music	Utsusemimaru/Kyoryu Gold (voice)	Main role
2014	Zyuden Sentai Kyoryuger vs. Go-Busters: The Great Dinosaur Battle! Farewell Our Eternal Friends	Utsusemimaru/Kyoryu Gold (voice)	Main role
2014	Toei Hero Next: We're the Bounty Hunter Troupe	Kinbara Toshirou	Main role
2015	Ressha Sentai ToQger vs. Kyoryuger: The Movie	Utsusemimaru/Kyoryu Gold (voice)	
2015	Mr. MAXMAN	Shimazaki Eiji	
2016	KABUKI DROP	Mikazuki/Atsushi Maruyama	as himself
2017	Bros. MAXMAN	Shimazaki Eiji	
2017	Kamen Rider × Super Sentai: Ultra Super Hero Taisen	Utsusemimaru/Kyoryu Gold (voice)	Main role
2018	N.Y. MAXMAN	Shimazaki Eiji	
2018	9~Nine~	Kazama Ryou	Main role
2018	Youth Discovery Film: Biscuit in my Pocket!!!!!!!!	Sasaki Akifumi	

=== Stage ===
- Fūma no Kojirō (2008) - Shien
- Chotto×3=Doppelgänger (2008)
- Saiyuki Kagekiden: Go to the West (2008) - Sha Gojyo
- Saiyuki Kagekiden: Dead or Alive (2009) - Sha Gojyo
- Killer SHU ~ SHOOT ME ~ (2009) - Surfer
- Takla Makan (2010) - Haruki
- Reverse Historica (2010) - Hamasaki / Akechi Mitsuhide
- SAMURAI 7 (2010) - Hyogo
- MISSING LINK (2011) - Yamada Yasushi
- SAMURAI 7 (2012) - Hyogo
- Model's Heart (2012) - Mendou Ataru
- Nazotoki wa Dinner no Ato de (2012) - Hosoyama Teruya
- Satomi Hakkenden (2014) - Inumura Daikaku
- CURRY LIFE (2015) - Kojirou
- We're the Bounty Hunter Troupe (Stage) (2015) - Kinbara Toshirou
- KABUKI (2016) - Mikazuki
- Yami Kariudo (2016) - Sumeragi Shizuma
- Sanada Ten Braves (2016) - Yuri Kamanosuke
- Farewell We're the Bounty Hunter Troupe (Stage) (2017) - Kinbara Toshirou
- Satomi Hakkenden (2017) - Inumura Daikaku
- Picaresque Seven (2018) - Evil Secret Association Grand Leader
- Lohengrin (2018) - Lohengrin (Youth)
- Transit Comedians Sketch Collection ~ 2018 Summer ~ (2018)
- Samurai Reincarnation (2018) - Toda Godayuu

=== Direct-to-Video ===
- Zyuden Sentai Kyoryuger: It's Here! Armed On Midsummer Festival!! (2013) - Utsusemimaru / Kyoryu Gold (voice)
- Zyuden Sentai Kyoryuger Returns: Hundred Years After (2014) - Uppy / Kyoryu Violet (voice), Utsusemimaru / Kyoryu Gold (voice)

=== Internet ===
- Smell of SHOWA Niconico Channel (2017–present)
- Brave Sentai Brave Frontier (2018) - Brave of Thunder Eze
- This Is Brave! Battle Frontier (2018) - Utsusemimaru / Kyoryu Gold (voice)

=== Advertising ===
- BANDAI "Kyoryu Gold Transformation Toy Series" (2013)
