= Kamen Rider Amazons =

- Japanese logo
- Also known as: Amazon Riders
- 仮面ライダーアマゾン
- Genre: Tokusatsu; Superhero fiction; Action drama; Horror; Biopunk; Thriller
- Based on: Kamen Rider Amazon by Shotaro Ishinomori
- Written by: Yasuko Kobayashi
- Directed by: Hidenori Ishida; Ryuta Tasaki; Osamu Kaneda
- Starring: Tom Fujita; Masashi Taniguchi; Rena Takeda; Ayu Higashi; Mitsutoshi Shundo; Ryota Kobayashi; Ryōma Baba; Kanon Miyahara; Hiroshi Asahina; Katsuya; Kazuya Tanabe; Yuu Kamio; Toshimasa Komatsu; Takako Katou; Takashi Fujiki; You Maejima; Ayana Shiramoto; Kōta Miura; Yoshito Momiki; Eiji Akaso; Kairi Miura; Shohei Domoto; Jun Yamasaki
- Ending theme: "Armour Zone" by Taro Kobayashi; "DIE SET DOWN" by Taro Kobayashi
- Composer: Kuniaki Haishima
- Country of origin: Japan
- No. of seasons: 2
- No. of episodes: 26

Production
- Producers: Shinichiro Shirakura (Toei); Naomi Takebe (Toei); Motoi Sasaki (TV Asahi); Atsushi Kaji (TV Asahi); Daisuke Furuya (Asatsu-DK)
- Running time: 30 minutes
- Production companies: Toei Company; Ishimori Productions; Amazon Studios; Asatsu-DK; Bandai Namco

Original release
- Network: Amazon Video; BS Asahi; Tokyo MX
- Release: April 1, 2016 – June 30, 2017

Kamen Rider Amazons (仮面ライダーアマゾンズ, Kamen Raidā Amazonzu), known outside Japan as Amazon Riders, is a 2016 Japanese superhero tokusatsu web drama. It is a darker and more mature reimagining of the 1974 television series Kamen Rider Amazon, and part of Toei's Super Hero Year, celebrating the 45th anniversary of the Kamen Rider Series (and the 40th series of Super Sentai). Amazon Riders was originally exclusively released through Amazon Video in Japan starting April 1, 2016. It was also broadcast on television on BS Asahi (TV Asahi's broadcast satellite channel) starting July 3, 2016, and Tokyo MX starting July 6, 2016. In a similar vein as the reboot films based on the Shōwa era series, Kamen Rider: The First & Kamen Rider: The Next, Kamen Rider Amazons takes place in an alternate universe separate from the main series timeline.

The second season was announced on May 31, 2016, that it will be released in spring 2017 on Amazon Prime. The second season is titled Kamen Rider Amazons Season 2 (仮面ライダーアマゾンズ Season 2, Kamen Raidā Amazonzu Shīzun Tsū) and was exclusively released through Amazon Video in Japan starting April 7, 2017.

Plans to release season one in international markets such as the United States, the United Kingdom, and Germany were announced in 2016. An English subtitled version of the first season launched on Amazon Prime on April 19, 2018 with Season 2 launching on September 21, 2018.

== Story ==
Haruka Mizusawa is a meek young man who became infected with Amazon Cells (アマゾン細胞, Amazon Saibō), which are created by the Nozama Pharmacy company (野座間製薬株式会社, Nozama Seiyaku Kabushikigaisha). This causes Haruka to transform into the feral berserker Amazon Omega as he strives to assert his humanity while fighting similarly infected creatures called the Amazons (アマゾン, Amazon). Haruka also encounters the Nozama Peston Service (ノザマペストンサービス, Nozama Pesuton Sābisu), Nozama Pharmacy's Amazon hunters, and Jin Takayama, a former cell biologist at Nozama Pharmacy and Amazon hunter who becomes Amazon Alpha. Later, Jun Maehara, a member of Nozama Peston Service who died once during an Amazons attacks, is revived into Amazon Sigma.

Taking place five years after the first season, Season 2 focuses on a new protagonist named Chihiro, a lone boy raised by Amazons who hates them but must suppress his cannibalistic urges and can transform into Amazon Neo, and is soon revealed to be the son of Jin Takayama. The original protagonist Haruka would later acquire an final form known as Amazon New Omega.

== Episodes ==
A unique feature of the series is that the episode titles are given in alphabetical order.

=== Kamen Rider Amazons (Amazon Riders) ===
No. overall	No. in season	Title	Original release date
1	1	"Amazonz"	April 1, 2016
2	2	"Beast Inside"	April 8, 2016
3	3	"Colony Of Ants"	April 15, 2016
4	4	"Die Or Kill"	April 22, 2016
5	5	"Eyes In The Dark"	April 29, 2016
6	6	"For What I Fight"	May 6, 2016
7	7	"Game Of The Butchers"	May 13, 2016
8	8	"Hero Or Not"	May 20, 2016
9	9	"Into The Cannibal's Pot"	May 27, 2016
10	10	"Jungle Law"	June 3, 2016
11	11	"Killing Day"	June 10, 2016
12	12	"Lost In The Fog"	June 17, 2016
13	13	"Masked"	June 24, 2016

=== Kamen Rider Amazons 2 (Amazon Riders 2) ===
No. overall	No. in season	Title	Original release date
14	1	"Neo"	April 7, 2017
15	2	"Orphans"	April 14, 2017
16	3	"Persona Non Grata"	April 21, 2017
17	4	"Quo Vadis?"	April 28, 2017
18	5	"Rambling Roses"	May 5, 2017
19	6	"Schooldays"	May 12, 2017
20	7	"The Third Degree"	May 19, 2017
21	8	"Under Wraps"	May 26, 2017
22	9	"Vanishing Wings"	June 2, 2017
23	10	"Way To Nowhere"	June 9, 2017
24	11	"Xing The Rubicon"	June 16, 2017
25	12	"Yellow Brick Road"	June 23, 2017
26	13	"AmazonZ"	June 30, 2017

== Films ==
=== Ultra Super Hero Taisen ===
A crossover film, titled Kamen Rider × Super Sentai: Ultra Super Hero Taisen (仮面ライダー×スーパー戦隊 超スーパーヒーロー大戦, Kamen Raidā × Supā Sentai Chō Supā Hīrō Taisen) featuring the casts of Kamen Rider Ex-Aid, Amazon Riders, Uchu Sentai Kyuranger, and Doubutsu Sentai Zyuohger, was released in Japan on March 25, 2017. This movie also celebrates the 10th anniversary of Kamen Rider Den-O and features the spaceship Andor Genesis from the Xevious game, which is used by the movie's main antagonists, as well as introduces the movie-exclusive Kamen Rider True Brave, played by Kamen Rider Brave's actor Toshiki Seto from Kamen Rider Ex-Aid, and the villain Shocker Great Leader III, played by the singer Diamond Yukai. In addition, individual actors from older Kamen Rider and Super Sentai TV series, Ryohei Odai (Kamen Rider Ryuki), Gaku Matsumoto (Shuriken Sentai Ninninger), Atsushi Maruyama (Zyuden Sentai Kyoryuger), and Hiroya Matsumoto (Tokumei Sentai Go-Busters) reprise their respective roles.

=== Season 1 - Awakening ===
A re-edited version of Kamen Rider Amazons, titled Kamen Rider Amazons the Movie: Season 1 - Awakening (劇場版 仮面ライダーアマゾンズ Season 1 覚醒, Gekijōban Kamen Raidā Amazonzu Shīzun Wan Kakusei), was released in Japan on May 5, 2018.

=== Season 2 - Reincarnation ===
A re-edited version of Kamen Rider Amazons Season 2, titled Kamen Rider Amazons the Movie: Season 2 - Reincarnation (劇場版 仮面ライダーアマゾンズ Season 2 輪廻, Gekijōban Kamen Raidā Amazonzu Shīzun Tsū Rinne), was released in Japan on May 12, 2018.

=== The Last Judgement ===
A sequel film titled Kamen Rider Amazons the Movie: The Last Judgement (仮面ライダーアマゾンズ THE MOVIE 最後ノ審判, Kamen Raidā Amazonzu Za Mūbī Saigo no Shinpan), which is set after the end of the second season and concludes the storyline, was released in Japan on May 19, 2018.

== Manga ==
Kamen Rider Amazons Gaiden: Light of Fireflies (仮面ライダーアマゾンズ外伝 蛍火, Kamen Raidā Amazonzu Gaiden Hotarubi), written by Shinjiro and supervised by Yasuko Kobayashi, is a manga adaptation that is a side story focusing on the Firefly Amazon, one of the Experiment Amazons. It takes place between the first and second seasons of Kamen Rider Amazons.

== Cast ==
- Haruka Mizusawa (水澤 悠, Mizusawa Haruka): Tom Fujita (藤田 富, Fujita Tomu)
- Jin Takayama (鷹山 仁, Takayama Jin): Masashi Taniguchi (谷口 賢志, Taniguchi Masashi)
- Mizuki Mizusawa (水澤 美月, Mizusawa Mizuki): Rena Takeda (武田 玲奈, Takeda Rena)
- Nanaha Izumi (泉 七羽, Izumi Nanaha): Ayu Higashi (東 亜優, Higashi Ayu)
- Makoto Shido (志藤 真, Shidō Makoto): Mitsutoshi Shundo (俊藤 光利, Shundō Mitsutoshi)
- Mamoru (マモル): Ryota Kobayashi (小林 亮太, Kobayashi Ryōta)
- Nozomi Takai (高井 望, Takai Nozomi): Kanon Miyahara (宮原 華音, Miyahara Kanon)
- Kazuya Misaki (三崎 一也, Misaki Kazuya): Katsuya (勝也)
- Kota Fukuda (福田 耕太, Fukuda Kōta): Kazuya Tanabe (田邊 和也, Tanabe Kazuya)
- Yugo Tachibana (橘 雄悟, Tachibana Yūgo): Yuu Kamio (神尾 佑, Kamio Yū)
- Shogo Kano (加納 省吾, Kanō Shōgo): Toshimasa Komatsu (小松 利昌, Komatsu Toshimasa)
- Reika Mizusawa (水澤 令華, Mizusawa Reika): Takako Katou (加藤 貴子, Katō Takako)
- Takaaki Tenjo (天条 隆顕, Tenjō Takaaki): Takashi Fujiki (藤木 孝, Fujiki Takashi)

Season 1 exclusively

- Ryusuke Otaki (大滝 竜介, Ōtaki Ryūsuke): Ryōma Baba (馬場 良馬, Baba Ryōma)
- Jun Maehara (前原 淳, Maehara Jun): Hiroshi Asahina (朝日奈 寛, Asahina Hiroshi)

Season 2 exclusively

- Chihiro (千翼): You Maejima (前嶋 曜, Maejima Yō)
- Iyu Hoshino (星埜 イユ, Hoshino Iyu): Ayana Shiramoto (白本 彩奈, Shiramoto Ayana)
- Takeshi Kurosaki (黒崎 武, Kurosaki Takeshi): Kōta Miura (三浦 孝太, Miura Kōta)
- Ichiro Fudamori (札森 一郎, Fudamori Ichirō): Yoshito Momiki (籾木 芳仁, Momiki Yoshito)
- Hiroki Nagase (長瀬 裕樹, Nagase Hiroki): Eiji Akaso (赤楚 衛二, Akaso Eiji)
- Takumi Yamashita (山下 琢己, Yamashita Takumi): Kairi Miura (三浦 海里, Miura Kairi)
- Kenta Kitamura (北村 健太, Kitamura Kenta): Shohei Domoto (堂本 翔平, Dōmoto Shōhei)
- Hajime Hoshino (星埜 始, Hoshino Hajime): Jun Yamasaki (山崎 潤, Yamasaki Jun)

=== Guest cast ===
Season 1

- Kukizono (久木園; 3, 4): Yuka Motohashi (本橋 由香, Motohashi Yuka)
- Soji Shitashimo (下霜 草司, Shitashimo Sōji; 7, 8): Tomohisa Yuge (弓削 智久, Yuge Tomohisa)
- Hajime Koyama (小山 ハジメ, Koyama Hajime; 7, 8): Soran Tamoto (タモト 清嵐, Tamoto Soran)
- Mika (ミカ; 9, 12): Miyuu Sawai (沢井 美優, Sawai Miyū)
- Sawaguchi (沢口; 9-11): Akiyoshi Shibata (柴田 明良, Shibata Akiyoshi)

Season 2

- Fujio (藤尾; 5, 6): Shinji Kasahara (笠原 紳司, Kasahara Shinji)

== Theme songs ==
- "Armour Zone"
  - Lyrics: Mike Sugiyama (マイクスギヤマ, Maiku Sugiyama)
  - Composition: Nobuo Yamada (山田 信夫, Yamada Nobuo)
  - Arrangement: Tetsuya Takahashi (高橋 哲也, Takahashi Tetsuya)
  - Artist: Taro Kobayashi (小林 太郎, Kobayashi Tarō)
  The theme song of the first season. This song is also used as the opening theme song for the television broadcast version of the series.
- "DIE SET DOWN"
  - Lyrics: Mike Sugiyama
  - Composition: Nobuo Yamada
  - Arrangement: Tetsuya Takahashi
  - Artist: Taro Kobayashi
  The theme song of the second season.
