= Kamen Rider W Returns =

Kamen Rider W Returns (仮面ライダーＷ(ダブル)Returns, Kamen Raidā Daburu Ritānzu) is a set of two V-Cinema (direct-to-video) releases that serve as spin-offs for characters from the Kamen Rider W television series and films. These films focus on the characters of Ryu Terui / Kamen Rider Accel (Minehiro Kinomoto) and Katsumi Daido / Kamen Rider Eternal (Mitsuru Matsuoka), though the series' main characters Shotaro Hidari (Renn Kiriyama), Philip (Masaki Suda), and Akiko Narumi (Hikaru Yamamoto) also make appearances. Koichi Sakamoto directs both films, with Keiichi Hasegawa writing Kamen Rider Accel and Riku Sanjo writing Kamen Rider Eternal.

Kamen Rider Accel (仮面ライダーアクセル, Kamen Raidā Akuseru) sees the titular character protecting a young thief from Hiroshi Sagami a corrupt member of the Fuuto Police Department, while also tackling life as a newlywed. This film was released on April 21, 2011. Kamen Rider Eternal (仮面ライダーエターナル, Kamen Raidā Etānaru) sees the mercenary group NEVER stumbling onto a Foundation X plot involving psychic super-soldiers. This film was released on July 21, 2011.

== Kamen Rider Accel ==
While settling into married life with Akiko Narumi, Ryu Terui is brought onto a case with Fuuto Police Department (FPD) members Captain Hiroshi Sagami and Inspector Yukihiro Ohno involving a woman named Aoi Katsuragi, the sole surviving member of a slain pickpocketing ring. Though she escapes from the police, Terui captures her before they are ambushed by Kamen Soldiers. FPD Detective Mikio Jinno covers their escape, but the pair are confronted by the Commander Dopant, who murdered Katsuragi's father. The monster places a bomb on her and shoots Jinno with Terui's gun before forcing Terui to help Katsuragi obtain an item she had previously stolen. Meanwhile, private detectives Shotaro Hidari and Philip attempt to console Narumi, who learns Terui is on the run for attempted murder and believes he is cheating on her.

Terui and Katsuragi learn from a surviving pickpocket that the pickpocketing ring's leader has the item. Arriving at a den of thieves, Terui discovers the item Katsuragi stole is a Gaia Memory Enhancing Adapter and takes it from the crime boss. Terui and Katsuragi arrive at the rendezvous point, but Ohno attempts to arrest Terui until Sagami arrives and kidnaps Katsuragi, who reveals he is the Commander Dopant. While attempting to pursue Sagami, Terui is confronted by Narumi, who runs off on him. Terui finds Sagami, who wants the former to work for him. With Hidari and Philip holding off the Kamen Soldiers, Terui fights Sagami and disarms Katsuragi's bomb, but Sagami uses the adapter to upgrade his Commander Gaia Memory and Dopant form so he can overpower Terui. Desiring Terui to give in to his vengeful feelings, Sagami kidnaps Narumi and attempts to kill her. However, Katsuragi steals the adapter and gets it to Terui, who uses it to upgrade his Rider powers so he can rescue Narumi and defeat Sagami. As Katsuragi turns herself in, Terui and Narumi begin their relationship anew.

== Kamen Rider Eternal ==
Years prior, following a fatal car crash, Foundation X scientist Maria revives her son Katsumi Daido as an undead Necro-Over. Despite the experiment being a success, Foundation X abandons the Daidos and the Necro-Over project in favor of the Museum's Gaia Memories. Swearing revenge, Daido goes on to form the mercenary group NEVER and recruits expert marksman Ken Ashihara, former Yakuza subordinate Kyosui Izumi, strongman Gozo Domoto, and serial criminal Reika Hanehara after turning them into Necro-Overs.

Sometime later, NEVER heads into a Southeast Asian country to kill the leader of a terrorist cell, only to learn a Quark named Mina beat them to it. She overpowers the mercenaries, but Daido defeats her and spares her upon learning she was forced to fight. Following introductions, Mina's fellow Quarks Lloyd and Shion arrive to take her back to their leader, Doctor Prospect of Foundation X. Daido and Hanehara attempt to stop the Quarks, but are stopped by Jun Kazu. Daido finds himself inexplicably attracted to Kazu's Eternal Gaia Memory, negating the latter's Rider powers. In response, Kazu uses his psychic powers to subdue Daido and Hanehara while Mina surrenders.

Daido comes to amongst Foundation X's Quark prisoners. A fight ensues until Mina stops them, seeing something in Daido that Prospect lacks. When Prospect arrives and reveals he controls the Quarks via his Dopant powers, Daido attempts to kill him, but Prospect overpowers him until a recently freed Hanehara spirits her leader away. While returning Daido's harmonica, Mina accidentally accesses his memories and reveals he will not be able to succeed in freeing the Quarks due to the Heaven's Fall barrier around the Quarks' camp. Refusing to listen, Daido and Hanehara inspire the Quarks to rebel. While NEVER leads the Quarks in fighting Foundation X, Daido leaves to face Prospect. Kazu impedes him, having acquired Dopant powers to replace his Rider powers, but Daido synchronizes with the Eternal Memory and utilizes Kazu's Rider equipment to kill him and destroy the Heaven's Fall controls. As NEVER evacuates the Quarks, Prospect attacks Daido, revealing all the latter did was ensure their deaths. A horrified Daido attempts to reach the Quarks, but Prospect uses his powers to kill them before they can leave the complex.

Prospect gloats over Daido, believing he broke the latter. However, Daido goes insane and thanks Prospect for reminding him that all people are devils before killing Prospect with NEVER's help, losing the Eternal Memory in the process. Refusing to revive Mina as a Necro-Over at Hanehara's request, Daido decides to seek revenge on the Museum by destroying Fuuto. (Note: As depicted in the film Kamen Rider W Forever A to Z/The Gaia Memories of Fate.) Unbeknownst to NEVER, Foundation X takes Kazu's body to revive him as a Necro-Over while Mina awakens.

In the present, Mina learns Daido was killed by Shotaro Hidari and Philip and attempts to seek revenge on them. After restraining her, the pair demand answers, but are caught off-guard when she reveals she knew Daido as a hero before recounting his story. As she is taken to the hospital, the pair return to the site of their fight with Daido and pay their respects.

== Release ==
Kamen Rider Accel was dedicated to the memory of Minoru Tanaka, who portrayed Hiroshi Sagami in the film (Final film role posthumous release).

== Cast ==
Cameo appearances in both

- Shotaro Hidari (左 翔太郎, Hidari Shōtarō): Renn Kiriyama (桐山 漣, Kiriyama Ren)
- Philip (フィリップ, Firippu): Masaki Suda (菅田 将暉, Suda Masaki)
- Akiko Narumi (鳴海 亜樹子, Narumi Akiko): Hikaru Yamamoto (山本 ひかる, Yamamoto Hikaru)

Kamen Rider Accel cast

- Ryu Terui (照井 竜, Terui Ryū): Minehiro Kinomoto (木ノ本 嶺浩, Kinomoto Minehiro)
- Aoi Katsuragi (葛木 葵, Katsuragi Aoi): Yukari Taki (滝 裕可里, Taki Yukari)
- Hiroshi Sagami (相模 広志, Sagami Hiroshi): Minoru Tanaka (田中 実, Tanaka Minoru)
- Yukihiro Ohno (大野 幸弘, Ōno Yukihiro): Mitsutoshi Shundō (俊藤 光利, Shundō Mitsutoshi)
- Mikio Jinno (刃野 幹夫, Jinno Mikio): Takeshi Nadagi (なだぎ 武, Nadagi Takeshi)
- Shun Makura (真倉 俊, Makura Shun): Shingo Nakagawa (中川 真吾, Nakagawa Shingo)
- Lily Shirogane (リリィ白銀, Riryi Shirogane): Nao Nagasawa (長澤 奈央, Nagasawa Nao)
- Frank Shirogane (フランク白銀, Furanku Shirogane): Fubito Yamano (山野 史人, Yamano Fubito)
- Masaru (マサル): Kohei Yamamoto (山本 康平, Yamamoto Kōhei)
- Nobu (ノブ): Kenta Nitta (新田 健太, Nitta Kenta)
- Miki (ミキ): Mitsumi Hiromura (広村 美つ美, Hiromura Mitsumi)
- Boss (先生, Sensei): Masahiro Noguchi (野口 雅弘, Noguchi Masahiro)
- Female Bodyguard (女用心棒, On'na Yōjinbō): Ayumi Shimozono (下園 愛弓, Shimozono Ayumi)
- Aoi's Father (葵の父親, Aoi no Chichioya): Taro Suwa (諏訪 太朗, Suwa Tarō)
- Drunken Man (酔っ払い, Yopparai): Keiichi Hasegawa (長谷川 圭一, Hasegawa Keiichi)
- Master of Fumen (風麺マスター, Fūmen Masutā): Hiroshi Doki (どうき ひろし, Dōki Hiroshi)

Kamen Rider Eternal cast

- Katsumi Daido (大道 克己, Daidō Katsumi): Mitsuru Matsuoka (松岡 充, Matsuoka Mitsuru)
  - Young Katsumi Daido: Masaki Suda
- Professor Maria (プロフェッサー・マリア, Purofessā Maria): Aya Sugimoto (杉本 彩, Sugimoto Aya)
- Kyosui Izumi (泉 京水, Izumi Kyōsui): Genki Sudo (須藤 元気, Sudō Genki)
- Reika Hanehara (羽原 レイカ, Hanehara Reika): Minase Yashiro (八代 みなせ, Yashiro Minase)
- Ken Ashihara (葦原 賢, Ashihara Ken): Masayuki Deai (出合 正幸, Deai Masayuki)
- Gozo Domoto (堂本 剛三, Dōmoto Gōzō): Koji Nakamura (中村 浩二, Nakamura Kōji)
- Jun Kazu (加頭 順, Kazu Jun): Gong Teyu (コン・テユ, Kon Teyu)
- Tabata (田端): Tsunekichi Takeoka (竹岡 常吉, Takeoka Tsunekichi)
- Mina (ミーナ, Mīna): Rin Takanashi (高梨 臨, Takanashi Rin)
- Doctor Prospect (ドクター・プロスペクト, Dokutā Purosupekuto): Jyunichi Haruta (春田 純一, Haruta Jun'ichi)
- Lloyd (ロイド, Roido): Sho Tomita (富田 翔, Tomita Shō)
- Shion (シオン): Sanae Hitomi (人見 早苗, Hitomi Sanae)
- Riki (リキ): Hiroyuki Hakamada (袴田 裕幸, Hakamada Hiroyuki)
- Cho-san (チョウさん, Chōsan): Hideyuki Otsuki (大月 秀幸, Ōtsuki Hideyuki)
- Nonko (ノンコ): Shizuka Midorikawa (緑川 静香, Midorikawa Shizuka)
- Sweets Man (スイーツの男, Suītsu no Otoko): Riku Sanjo (三条 陸, Sanjō Riku)

== Theme songs ==
"Kamen Rider Accel" opening theme

- "Leave all Behind"
  - Lyrics: Shoko Fujibayashi
  - Composition: Ryo (of defspiral)
  - Arrangement: Wilma-Sidr
  - Artist: Wilma-Sidr

"Kamen Rider Eternal" ending theme

- "cod-E ~E no Angō~" (cod-E ～Eの暗号～, Kōdo Ī ~Ī no Angō~; lit. "Code E")
  - Lyrics and Composition: Mitsuru Matsuoka
  - Artist: SOPHIA
