= Kamen Rider W =

Japanese tokusatsu drama television series

- Also known as: Kamen Rider Double
- Genre: Tokusatsu; Superhero fiction Action; Detective fiction Comedy; Supernatural
- Created by: Shotaro Ishinomori
- Written by: Riku Sanjo
- Directed by: Ryuta Tasaki
- Starring: Renn Kiriyama; Masaki Suda; Hikaru Yamamoto; Minehiro Kinomoto; Ami Namai; Rin Asuka; Shingo Nakagawa; Takeshi Nadagi; Minori Terada
- Voices of: Naoko Kouda
- Narrated by: Fumihiko Tachiki
- Theme music composer: Shuhei Naruse
- Opening theme: "W-B-X ~W-Boiled Extreme~" by Aya Kamiki w TAKUYA
- Composer: Kōtarō Nakagawa
- Country of origin: Japan
- Original language: Japanese
- No. of episodes: 49 (list of episodes)

Production
- Producers: Kengo Motoi (TV Asahi); Hideaki Tsukada (Toei); Kazuhiro Takahashi (Toei)
- Running time: 20–25 minutes
- Production companies: Toei Company; Ishimori Productions; TV Asahi Corporation; Asatsu-DK

Original release
- Network: ANN (TV Asahi)
- Release: September 6, 2009 – August 29, 2010

Related
- Kamen Rider Decade; Kamen Rider OOO

Kamen Rider W (仮面ライダーW, Kamen Raidā Daburu) is a 2009–2010 Japanese tokusatsu drama, the 11th series in the Heisei period run of the Kamen Rider Series and the 12th overall. It premiered on September 6, 2009 following Kamen Rider Decade's finale, and aired alongside Samurai Sentai Shinkenger in TV Asahi's Super Hero Time programming block. Following Shinkenger's finale on February 7, 2010, it aired alongside Tensou Sentai Goseiger, until W concluded on August 29, 2010. The series has been described as the "Heisei Kamen Rider 10th Anniversary Project: Fall Campaign" (平成仮面ライダー10周年プロジェクト 秋の陣, Heisei Kamen Raidā Jusshūnen Purojekuto: Aki no Jin). The series is notable for being the first installment in what is often considered the second phase of Heisei-era Kamen Rider. A sequel manga series, Fuuto PI, began serialization in August 2017 and an anime adaptation began airing in August 2022.

== Promotion ==
Advertisements throughout the months of May, June, and July 2009 built up to the debut of Kamen Rider W, who first appeared at the 10th Anniversary Project MASKED RIDER LIVE & SHOW event, and also featured in Kamen Rider Decade: All Riders vs. Dai-Shocker.

Hiroshi Tanahashi of New Japan Pro-Wrestling is a self-admitted fan of Kamen Rider W, in June 2010 made a new costume designed after Kamen Rider W FangJoker's design and wore it at a match in Osaka on June 19. Rin Asuka also appeared at the match to promote the show.

== Production and casting ==
The Kamen Rider W trademark was registered by Toei on March 27, 2009.

The series' main writer is Riku Sanjo and the main director is Ryuta Tasaki. The theme song titled "W-B-X ~W-Boiled Extreme~" is performed by Aya Kamiki with former JUDY AND MARY guitarist TAKUYA as the unit "Aya Kamiki w TAKUYA" (上木彩矢 w TAKUYA, Kamiki Aya wizu TAKUYA). The creature designer is Katsuya Terada, previously the character designer for Blood: The Last Vampire, the designer of Monster X for Godzilla: Final Wars, the designer of Cutie Honey's costume for Cutie Honey, and the mechanic and character design refinement for Yatterman. Sanjo also reused know-hows obtained from his Dragon Quest: The Adventure of Dai and other Weekly Shōnen Jump manga works for the conceptions of Kamen Rider W.

Newcomer Masaki Suda portrays the mysterious Philip. Drama actor Renn Kiriyama, who made his acting debut as Bunta Marui in Musical Prince of Tennis: Absolute King Rikkai feat. Rokkaku ~ First Service, joins the cast as Shotaro Hidari. Hikaru Yamamoto, who made her acting debut in Watashitachi no Kyōkasho as Chiharu Nobue, portrays the female lead Akiko Narumi. Comedian and actor Takeshi Nadagi portrays Mikio Jinno and veteran actor Minori Terada, known for his leading role in The Human Bullet, portrays Ryubee Sonozaki.

== Story ==
Many people live in peace and harmony in Fuuto (風都, Fūto; the "Windy City"), an ecologically-minded and wind-powered city. However, this peace is undermined by the Sonozaki Family, who sell mysterious flash drive-like devices called Gaia Memories to criminals and other interested parties. These individuals use the Gaia Memories to become Dopants, committing crimes with the police force powerless to stop them. To make matters worse, the Gaia Memories can cause their users to go insane, to the point where they could die from using the devices unrestrained. After the death of his boss Sokichi Narumi, the self-proclaimed hard-boiled detective Shotaro Hidari works with the mysterious Philip, who possesses a set of purified Gaia Memories, to investigate Dopant-related crimes in Fuuto. With their Gaia Memories and the Double Driver belts, Shotaro and Philip transform and combine into Kamen Rider W to fight the Dopant menace and keep Fuuto safe. While joined in their fight by investigator Ryu Terui, who transforms into Kamen Rider Accel, the mystery of Philip's past, his relation to the Sonozaki Family, and their Museum organization are revealed.

== Episodes ==
All episodes of Kamen Rider W have two titles: the first indicates a story arc while the second indicates the episode's title. The letter of the Latin alphabet in the story arc title has a double meaning: it represents a major character (Kamen Rider, Dopant, or otherwise) that is featured in the arc and another English word that indicates the theme of the arc.

No.	Title	Double meaning	Directed by	Written by	Original release date
1	"The W Search/Two Halves of One Detective"; Transliteration: "W no Kensaku/Tantei wa Futari de Hitori" (Japanese: Ｗの検索／探偵は二人で一人)	Kamen Rider W Word	Ryuta Tasaki	Riku Sanjo	September 6, 2009
2	"The W Search/Those Who Make the City Grieve"; Transliteration: "W no Kensaku/Machi o Nakaseru Mono" (Japanese: Ｗの検索／街を泣かせるもの)	Kamen Rider W Word	Ryuta Tasaki	Riku Sanjo	September 13, 2009
3	"Don't Touch the M/How to Get to Heaven"; Transliteration: "M ni Te o Dasu na/Tengoku e no Ikikata" (Japanese: Ｍに手を出すな／天国への行き方)	Money; Memories	Satoshi Morota	Riku Sanjo	September 20, 2009
4	"Don't Touch the M/Play With a Joker"; Transliteration: "M ni Te o Dasu na/Jōkā de Shōbu" (Japanese: Ｍに手を出すな／ジョーカーで勝負)	Money; Memories	Satoshi Morota	Riku Sanjo	September 27, 2009
5	"The Girl... A/Papa Is a Kamen Rider"; Transliteration: "Shōjo... A/Papa wa Kamen Raidā" (Japanese: 少女…Ａ／パパは仮面ライダー)	Anomalocaris; Asuka	Naosuke Kurosawa	Riku Sanjo	October 4, 2009
6	"The Girl... A/The Price of Lying"; Transliteration: "Shōjo... A/Uso no Daishō" (Japanese: 少女…Ａ／嘘の代償)	Anomalocaris; Asuka	Naosuke Kurosawa	Riku Sanjo	October 11, 2009
7	"Find the C/Philip Can't Stand It"; Transliteration: "C o Sagase/Firippu wa Sore o Gaman Dekinai" (Japanese: Ｃを探せ／フィリップはそれを我慢できない)	Cockroach; Clients	Ryuta Tasaki	Naruhisa Arakawa	October 18, 2009
8	"Find the C/Dancing Hero"; Transliteration: "C o Sagase/Danshingu Hīrō" (Japanese: Ｃを探せ／ダンシングヒーロー)	Cockroach; Clients	Ryuta Tasaki	Naruhisa Arakawa	October 25, 2009
9	"The S Terror/The Maid Detective Witnessed It!"; Transliteration: "S na Senritsu/Meido Tantei wa Mita!" (Japanese: Ｓな戦慄／メイド探偵は見た！)	Sweets; Sonozaki	Takayuki Shibasaki	Riku Sanjo	November 8, 2009
10	"The S Terror/The Great Detective's Daughter"; Transliteration: "S na Senritsu/Meitantei no Musume" (Japanese: Ｓな戦慄/名探偵の娘)	Sweets; Sonozaki	Takayuki Shibasaki	Riku Sanjo	November 15, 2009
11	"The Revenge V/Infected Car"; Transliteration: "Fukushū no V/Kansensha" (Japanese: 復讐のＶ／感染車)	Virus; Vehicle	Satoshi Morota	Keiichi Hasegawa	November 22, 2009
12	"The Revenge V/Grudge Beast"; Transliteration: "Fukushū no V/Onnenjū" (Japanese: 復讐のＶ／怨念獣)	Virus; Vehicle	Satoshi Morota	Keiichi Hasegawa	November 29, 2009
13	"The Q on the Radio/Targeted Princess"; Transliteration: "Redio de Q/Nerawareta Purinsesu" (Japanese: レディオでＱ／狙われたプリンセス)	Question; Queen	Hidenori Ishida	Keiichi Hasegawa	December 6, 2009
14	"The Q on the Radio/Live Catastrophe"; Transliteration: "Redio de Q/Namahōsō Daipanikku" (Japanese: レディオでＱ／生放送大パニック)	Question; Queen	Hidenori Ishida	Keiichi Hasegawa	December 13, 2009
15	"The F Afterglow/Burglary Rider"; Transliteration: "F no Zankō/Gōtō Raidā" (Japanese: Ｆの残光／強盗ライダー)	Fang; Fake	Takayuki Shibasaki	Riku Sanjo	December 20, 2009
16	"The F Afterglow/Recover Your Partner"; Transliteration: "F no Zankō/Aibō o Torimodose" (Japanese: Ｆの残光／相棒をとりもどせ)	Fang; Fake	Takayuki Shibasaki	Riku Sanjo	January 3, 2010
17	"Farewell N/Memory Kids"; Transliteration: "Saraba N yo/Memori Kizzu" (Japanese: さらばＮよ／メモリキッズ)	Nasca; Naïveté	Satoshi Morota	Keiichi Hasegawa	January 10, 2010
18	"Farewell N/The Friend with the Wind"; Transliteration: "Saraba N yo/Tomo wa Kaze to Tomo ni" (Japanese: さらばＮよ／友は風と共に)	Nasca; Naïveté	Satoshi Morota	Keiichi Hasegawa	January 17, 2010
19	"The I Doesn't Stop/That Guy's Name Is Accel"; Transliteration: "I ga Tomaranai/Yatsu no Na wa Akuseru" (Japanese: Ｉが止まらない／奴の名はアクセル)	Ice Age; Investigation	Hidenori Ishida	Riku Sanjo	January 24, 2010
20	"The I Doesn't Stop/Kamen Rider Style"; Transliteration: "I ga Tomaranai/Kamen Raidā no Ryūgi" (Japanese: Ｉが止まらない／仮面ライダーの流儀)	Ice Age; Investigation	Hidenori Ishida	Riku Sanjo	January 31, 2010
21	"The T Returns/A Melody Not Intended for Women"; Transliteration: "Kaettekita T/Onna ni wa Mukanai Merodi" (Japanese: 還ってきたＴ／女には向かないメロディ)	Triceratops; Transfer	Koichi Sakamoto	Keiichi Hasegawa	February 7, 2010
22	"The T Returns/The Man Who Can't Die"; Transliteration: "Kaettekita T/Shinanai Otoko" (Japanese: 還ってきたＴ／死なない男)	Triceratops; Transfer	Koichi Sakamoto	Keiichi Hasegawa	February 14, 2010
23	"L on the Lips/Singer-SongRider"; Transliteration: "Kuchibiru ni L o/Shingā Songuraidā" (Japanese: 唇にＬを／シンガーソングライダー)	Liar; Lyrics	Ryuta Tasaki	Riku Sanjo	February 21, 2010
24	"L on the Lips/The Liar is You"; Transliteration: "Kuchibiru ni L o/Usotsuki wa Omae da" (Japanese: 唇にＬを／嘘つきはおまえだ)	Liar; Lyrics	Ryuta Tasaki	Riku Sanjo	February 28, 2010
25	"The P's Game/The Doll Has Sticky Fingers"; Transliteration: "P no Yūgi/Ningyō wa Tekuse ga Warui" (Japanese: Ｐの遊戯／人形は手癖が悪い)	Puppeteer; Parent	Hidenori Ishida	Keiichi Hasegawa	March 7, 2010
26	"The P's Game/Akiko on the Run"; Transliteration: "P no Yūgi/Akiko On Za Ran" (Japanese: Ｐの遊戯／亜樹子オン・ザ・ラン)	Puppeteer; Parent	Hidenori Ishida	Keiichi Hasegawa	March 14, 2010
27	"The D Was Watching/The Transparent Magical Lady"; Transliteration: "D ga Miteita/Tōmei Majikaru Redi" (Japanese: Ｄが見ていた／透明マジカルレディ)	Denden; Disappearance	Koichi Sakamoto	Riku Sanjo	March 21, 2010
28	"The D Was Watching/Twin Maximum Suicide"; Transliteration: "D ga Miteita/Kesshi no Tsuin Makishimamu" (Japanese: Ｄが見ていた／決死のツインマキシマム)	Denden; Disappearance	Koichi Sakamoto	Riku Sanjo	March 28, 2010
29	"The Nightmarish H/The Melancholy of the Sleeping Princess"; Transliteration: "Akumu na H/Nemuri Hime no Yūutsu" (Japanese: 悪夢なＨ／眠り姫のユウウツ)	Himeka; Horror	Ryuta Tasaki	Keiichi Hasegawa	April 4, 2010
30	"The Nightmarish H/Who is the Prince?"; Transliteration: "Akumu na H/Ōjisama wa Dare da?" (Japanese: 悪夢なＨ／王子様は誰だ？)	Himeka; Horror	Ryuta Tasaki	Keiichi Hasegawa	April 11, 2010
31	"The B Carried on the Wind/The Beast Must Be Pursued"; Transliteration: "Kaze ga Yobu B/Yajū Oubeshi" (Japanese: 風が呼ぶＢ／野獣追うべし)	Beast; Bird	Satoshi Morota	Riku Sanjo	April 18, 2010
32	"The B Carried on the Wind/Now, in the Radiance"; Transliteration: "Kaze ga Yobu B/Ima, Kagayaki no Naka de" (Japanese: 風が呼ぶＢ／今、輝きの中で)	Beast; Bird	Satoshi Morota	Riku Sanjo	April 25, 2010
33	"Y's Tragedy/The Woman Looking For Yesterday"; Transliteration: "Y no Higeki/Kinō o Sagasu Onna" (Japanese: Ｙの悲劇／きのうを探す女)	Yesterday; Yukie	Hidenori Ishida	Kazuki Nakashima	May 2, 2010
34	"Y's Tragedy/Brother and Sister"; Transliteration: "Y no Higeki/Ani Imōto" (Japanese: Ｙの悲劇／あにいもうと)	Yesterday; Yukie	Hidenori Ishida	Kazuki Nakashima	May 9, 2010
35	"Beyond the R/The Rain Called Monster Approaches"; Transliteration: "R no Kanata ni/Yagate Kaibutsu toiu Na no Ame" (Japanese: Ｒの彼方に／やがて怪物という名の雨)	Ryu; Rain	Ryuta Tasaki	Keiichi Hasegawa	May 16, 2010
36	"Beyond the R/Surpass Them All"; Transliteration: "R no Kanata ni/Subete o Furikire" (Japanese: Ｒの彼方に／全てを振り切れ)	Ryu; Rain	Ryuta Tasaki	Keiichi Hasegawa	May 23, 2010
37	"Visitor X/The Bridge of Promises"; Transliteration: "Raihōsha X/Yakusoku no Hashi" (Japanese: 来訪者Ｘ／約束の橋)	Foundation X Xtreme	Satoshi Morota	Keiichi Hasegawa	May 30, 2010
38	"Visitor X/In the Name of the Museum"; Transliteration: "Raihōsha X/Myūjiamu no Na no Moto ni" (Japanese: 来訪者Ｘ／ミュージアムの名のもとに)	Foundation X Xtreme	Satoshi Morota	Keiichi Hasegawa	June 6, 2010
39	"The Likelihood of the G/Bad Cinema Paradise"; Transliteration: "G no Kanōsei/Baddo Shinema Paradaisu" (Japanese: Ｇの可能性／バッドシネマパラダイス)	Gene; Genre	Takayuki Shibasaki	Riku Sanjo	June 20, 2010
40	"The Likelihood of the G/You Are Unforgivable"; Transliteration: "G no Kanōsei/Anata ga Yurusenai" (Japanese: Ｇの可能性／あなたが許せない)	Gene; Genre	Takayuki Shibasaki	Riku Sanjo	June 27, 2010
41	"The J Labyrinth/The Psychotic Villainess"; Transliteration: "J no Meikyū/Ryōkiteki na Akujo" (Japanese: Ｊの迷宮／猟奇的な悪女)	Jewel; Jinno	Hidenori Ishida	Keiichi Hasegawa	July 4, 2010
42	"The J Labyrinth/The Diamond Is Hurt"; Transliteration: "J no Meikyū/Daiyamondo wa Kizutsuite" (Japanese: Ｊの迷宮／ダイヤモンドは傷ついて)	Jewel; Jinno	Hidenori Ishida	Keiichi Hasegawa	July 11, 2010
43	"The O Chain/The Aged Detective"; Transliteration: "O no Rensa/Rōjin Tantei" (Japanese: Ｏの連鎖／老人探偵)	Old; Obscured	Koichi Sakamoto	Keiichi Hasegawa	July 18, 2010
44	"The O Chain/Shroud's Confession"; Transliteration: "O no Rensa/Shuraudo no Kokuhaku" (Japanese: Ｏの連鎖／シュラウドの告白)	Old; Obscured	Koichi Sakamoto	Keiichi Hasegawa	July 25, 2010
45	"Who the K Needs/The Devil's Tail"; Transliteration: "K ga Motometa Mono/Akuma no Shippo" (Japanese: Ｋが求めたもの／悪魔のしっぽ)	Kyoko; King	Satoshi Morota	Riku Sanjo	August 1, 2010
46	"Who the K Needs/The Last Supper"; Transliteration: "K ga Motometa Mono/Saigo no Bansan" (Japanese: Ｋがもとめたもの／最後の晩餐)	Kyoko; King	Satoshi Morota	Riku Sanjo	August 8, 2010
47	"The Abandoned U/A Request From Philip"; Transliteration: "Nokosareta U/Firippu kara no Irai" (Japanese: 残されたＵ／フィリップからの依頼)	Utopia; Union	Hidenori Ishida	Riku Sanjo	August 15, 2010
48	"The Abandoned U/Eternal Partners"; Transliteration: "Nokosareta U/Eien no Aibō" (Japanese: 残されたＵ／永遠の相棒)	Utopia; Union	Hidenori Ishida	Riku Sanjo	August 22, 2010
49	"Goodbye to the E/A Bouquet of Justice to This City"; Transliteration: "E ni Sayonara/Kono Machi ni Seigi no Hanataba o" (Japanese: Ｅにさよなら／この街に正義の花束を)	Energy; Ending	Hidenori Ishida	Riku Sanjo	August 29, 2010

== Wind Wave Internet radio ==
To tie into the show, TV Asahi, Toei, and Avex Trax have produced the Wind Wave FM Internet radio station. Only one of the shows, Wakana's Healing Princess (園咲若菜のヒーリングプリンセス, Sonozaki Wakana no Hīringu Purinsesu), also exists within the fiction of Kamen Rider W. The other programs, DJ Hurry Kenn's FU-TO Hit on Groove music show and Tsuyoshi and Ayano's Head Wind: One-Game Match!! (向い風 一本勝負!!, Mukaikaze Ipponshōbu!!) show, treat the television series as fiction, explicitly referring to the songs they play as theme songs (as part of a mail in request, DJ Hurry Kenn played AAA DEN-O form's "Climax Jump", and referred to it as the theme song for Kamen Rider Den-O). All of W's theme songs have been played as part of the various radio shows, several of which were first heard on the "radio" before being utilized as part of an episode's soundtrack. On March 7, a new radio show featuring Queen & Elizabeth titled Queen & Elizabeth's White Hearts!! (QueenとElizabethの白抜きハートマーク!!, Kuīn to Erisabesu no Shironuki Hātomāku!!) began "airing", but was discontinued a month later. To mirror the current events in the show's story, Healing Princess was cancelled on June 13, 2010.

== Films ==
Kamen Rider W made their first appearance as a cameo in the film Kamen Rider Decade: All Riders vs. Dai-Shocker.

=== Movie War 2010 ===
As part of the Kamen Rider × Kamen Rider W & Decade: Movie War 2010 (仮面ライダー×仮面ライダー Ｗ（ダブル）&ディケイド MOVIE大戦2010, Kamen Raidā × Kamen Raidā Daburu Ando Dikeido Mūbī Taisen Nisenjū) triple feature, W's film Kamen Rider W: Begins Night (劇場版 仮面ライダーＷ（ダブル）～ビギンズナイト～, Kamen Raidā Daburu ~Biginzu Naito~) opened in Japanese theaters on December 12, 2009. The film expands on the origins of Kamen Rider W, featuring guest star Koji Kikkawa as Shotaro's mentor and Akiko's father Sokichi Narumi. The events of the movie took place between episodes 14 and 15.

=== A to Z/The Gaia Memories of Fate ===
In addition to the Movie War 2010 films, W also has a feature film titled Kamen Rider W Forever: A to Z/The Gaia Memories of Fate (仮面ライダーＷ（ダブル） FOREVER AtoZ／運命のガイアメモリ, Kamen Raidā Daburu Fōebā Ē tu Zetto/Unmei no Gaia Memori). Filmed in 3-D, it was released in theaters on August 7, 2010, double-billed with Tensou Sentai Goseiger: Epic on the Movie. Mitsuru Matsuoka, lead singer of Sophia served as the film's primary antagonist. It also features the first on-screen appearance of the 12th Heisei Kamen Rider: Kamen Rider OOO portrayed by Shu Watanabe as Eiji Hino. The events of the movie took place between episodes 44 and 45.

=== Movie War Core ===
The second Movie War film to primarily feature W, titled Kamen Rider × Kamen Rider OOO & W Featuring Skull: Movie War Core (仮面ライダー×仮面ライダー オーズ&ダブル feat.スカル MOVIE大戦CORE, Kamen Raidā × Kamen Raidā Ōzu Ando Daburu Fīcharingu Sukaru Mūbī Taisen Koa), was released in theatres on December 18, 2010, with the main W section titled Kamen Rider Skull: Message for W (仮面ライダースカル メッセージforダブル, Kamen Raidā Sukaru: Messēji fō Daburu).

=== Let's Go Kamen Riders ===
Kiriyama and Suda made cameo appearances, reprising their roles as Shotaro Hidari and Philip in the 40th-anniversary film OOO, Den-O, All Riders: Let's Go Kamen Riders (オーズ・電王・オールライダー レッツゴー仮面ライダー, Ōzu Den'ō Ōru Raidā Rettsu Gō Kamen Raidā).

=== Movie War Mega Max ===
Kiriyama and Suda reprised their roles as Shotaro Hidari and Philip in the 2011 film Kamen Rider × Kamen Rider Fourze & OOO: Movie War Mega Max (仮面ライダー×仮面ライダー フォーゼ&オーズ MOVIE大戦MEGA MAX, Kamen Raidā × Kamen Raidā Fōze Ando Ōzu Mūbī Taisen Mega Makkusu), released on December 10, 2011. The third out of the 5 parts of this Movie War, Fuuto: The Conspiracy Advances (風都 暗躍する陰謀, Fūto Anyaku Suru Inbō), took places in Fuuto and featured Kamen Rider W continuing his battle against Foundation X.

=== Kamen Rider Taisen ===
Heisei Rider vs. Shōwa Rider: Kamen Rider Taisen feat. Super Sentai (平成ライダー対昭和ライダー 仮面ライダー大戦 feat.スーパー戦隊, Heisei Raidā Tai Shōwa Raidā Kamen Raidā Taisen Fīcharingu Sūpā Sentai) made its theater debut on March 29, 2014. Masahiro Inoue, playing Kamen Rider Decade, alongside many other lead actors of other series appeared in the film, including Gaku Sano of Kamen Rider Gaim, Renn Kiriyama of Kamen Rider W, Kohei Murakami and Kento Handa of Kamen Rider 555, Shunya Shiraishi from Kamen Rider Wizard, Ryo Hayami of Kamen Rider X, and Hiroshi Fujioka of the original Kamen Rider. The Sentai teams' Ressha Sentai ToQger and Ryo Ryusei as Daigo Kiryu from Zyuden Sentai Kyoryuger were also in the movie. Shun Sugata playing Kamen Rider ZX from the Birth of the 10th! Kamen Riders All Together!! TV special returned, also performing as Ambassador Darkness. Itsuji Itao of Kamen Rider The First played Ren Aoi, Kamen Rider Fifteen, a main antagonist of the film.

== Video games ==
- A second port of Kamen Rider: Climax Heroes titled Kamen Rider: Climax Heroes W (仮面ライダー クライマックスヒーローズＷ(ダブル), Kamen Raidā Kuraimakkusu Hīrōzu Daburu) for the Wii was released on December 3, 2009. It features Kamen Rider W as a playable character and also features Dopants and other kaijin as characters in the game.
- Kamen Rider: Memory of Heroez is a 3D action game, which was released on October 29, 2020 for PlayStation 4 and Nintendo Switch. It features the cast from Kamen Rider W, OOO and Zero-One, whereas Kamen Riders W (including Joker and W FangJoker) and Accel as playable characters, though with Yoshimasa Hosoya, Koki Uchiyama, and Makoto Furukawa voicing them instead of Renn Kiriyama, Masaki Suda, and Minehiro Kinomoto respectively.

== Mini-dramas ==
As part of the special features on the DVD releases, a series of short films are included called "Shotaro Hidari Hard-Boiled Delusion Diary" (左翔太郎ハードボイルド妄想日記, Hidari Shōtarō Hādoboirudo Mōsō Nikki) in which Shotaro daydreams about what life would be like if he, Akiko, or Ryu acted differently. These feature a Dopant from the DVD volume in a completely different role than it had in the series proper. These are then followed by members of the cast discussing their favorite parts of the episodes included in the DVD volume. These mini-dramas appear again in Fuuto PI.

Volume titles

1. If Akiko Was Actually an Excellent Secretary (もしも亜樹子が優秀な秘書だったら, Moshimo Akiko ga Yūshū na Hisho dattara)
2. If Akiko Was Actually a City Councilwoman (もしも亜樹子が市議会議員だったら, Moshimo Akiko ga Shigikaigiin dattara)
3. If Akiko Was Actually a Maid (もしも亜樹子がメイドだったら, Moshimo Akiko ga Meido dattara)
4. If Akiko Was Actually a Phantom Thief (もしも亜樹子が怪盗だったら, Moshimo Akiko ga Kaitō dattara)
5. If Ryu Was Actually a Private Investigator (もしも竜が探偵だったら, Moshimo Ryū ga Tantei dattara)
6. If Akiko Was Actually an Idol (もしも亜樹子がアイドルだったら, Moshimo Akiko ga Aidoru dattara)
7. If Akiko Was Actually a Magician (もしも亜樹子がマジシャンだったら, Moshimo Akiko ga Majishan dattara)
8. If Akiko Was Actually "Gokutsuma" (もしも亜樹子が【極妻】だったら, Moshimo Akiko ga "Gokutsuma" dattara)
9. If Akiko Was Actually a Younger Sister (もしも亜樹子が妹だったら, Moshimo Akiko ga Imōto dattara)
10. If Akiko Was Actually a Hit Man (もしも亜樹子が殺し屋だったら, Moshimo Akiko ga Koroshiya dattara)
11. If Akiko Was Actually an Old Woman (もしも亜樹子がおばあちゃんだったら, Moshimo Akiko ga Obaachan dattara)
12. If Everyone Was Actually Hard-Boiled (もしも誰もがハードボイルドだったら, Moshimo Dare mo ga Hādoboirudo dattara)

== Planetarium film ==
At several planetaria throughout Japan, Toei had produced a film called "Kamen Rider: The Fearful Global Warming Plan" (仮面ライダー 恐怖の地球温暖化計画, Kamen Raidā Kyōfu no Chikyū Ondanka Keikaku) to teach children about global warming (with narration by Hirohiko Kakegawa). Shotaro Hidari (portrayed by Kiriyama) and Philip (portrayed by Suda) who transform into Kamen Rider W, alongside Kamen Rider 1 (voiced by Tetsu Inada), Kamen Rider 2 (voiced by Takahiro Fujimoto), and the ten previous Heisei Riders, fight Shocker led by its President (Hidekatsu Shibata) and Gelshocker's Leechameleon (voiced by Yasuhiro Takato) who plan on destroying the Earth by having it succumb to global warming. Airings first began at the Fukuoka Science Museum on June 5, 2010, and later at Kagawa Prefecture's Sanuki Kid's Land, Chūō, Tokyo's Time Dome Akashi, the Seki Manabi Center, the Kagoshima Municipal Science Center, the Tondabayashi Subaru Hall, and the Sendai Astronomical Observatory in Aoba-ku, with shows starting later in the year at the Kobe Science Museum in Chūō-ku, Kobe, and the Saitama Municipal Youth's Astronomical Science Museum in Urawa-ku, Saitama.

== Televi-Kun DVDs ==
The Hyper Battle DVD for W is titled Kamen Rider W Hyper Battle DVD: Donburi's α/Farewell Beloved Recipe (仮面ライダーＷ（ダブル） 超バトルDVD 丼のα／さらば愛しのレシピよ, Kamen Raidā Daburu Haipā Batoru Dī Bui Dī Donburi no α/Saraba Itoshi no Reshipi yo). It features a cooking contest between Ryu Terui, Akiko Narumi, and Shotaro Hidari, in order to best figure out what the contents of the Donburi Dopant are, to eventually discover that he is the Oyakodon Dopant. The Hyper Battle DVD features guest stars Hiroshi as the OmuriFu Shop's Master Izo Aida (相田 伊三, Aida Izō), Reina Fujie of AKB48 as his daughter Eriko Aida (相田 エリコ, Aida Eriko), and Shinichiro Ohta of Iron Chef fame as the voice of the Frog Pod who comments throughout the cooking contest (Ōta also served as the narrator in GoGo Sentai Boukenger).

The Kamen Rider W DVD: Gaia Memory Field Guide (仮面ライダーＷ（ダブル） DVD ガイアメモリ大図鑑, Kamen Raidā Daburu Dī Bui Dī Gaia Memori Daizukan) is a DVD packaged with the August 2010 issue of Televi-Kun magazine. The issue also comes with a short book with the information described in the DVD. The DVD is set shortly after the Hyper Battle DVD, and features the content normally found in the Hyper Battle DVD (explaining the powers and weapons of the Kamen Riders), explained as Philip having come down with temporary amnesia after slipping on an egg shell and hitting his head.

== W Returns ==
Kamen Rider W Returns (仮面ライダーＷ（ダブル） RETURNS, Kamen Raidā Daburu Ritānzu) is a set of two V-Cinema releases that focus on side stories of Ryu Terui as Kamen Rider Accel and Katsumi Daido as Kamen Rider Eternal. Both releases are named after their primary character.

== Playback ==
W's S.I.C Hero Saga side story Kamen Rider W: Playback commemorates the 40th anniversary of the Kamen Rider Series with Shotaro Hidari and Philip leading Shotaro Ishinomori through the events following his creation of the television series in 1971. The first episode was published in Hobby Japan, July 2011. Each episode is named after a different story written by Raymond Chandler.

1. Red Wind (赤い風, Akai Kaze)
2. The Finger Man (指さす男, Yubisasu Otoko)
3. Double Indemnity (深夜の告白, Shin'ya no Kokuhaku)
4. The Big Sleep (大いなる眠り, Ōinaru Nemuri)
5. The High Window (高い窓, Takai Mado)
6. The Little Sister (かわいい女, Kawaii Onna)
7. The Long Goodbye (長いお別れ, Nagai Owakare)

== The One Who Continues After Z ==
Novel: Kamen Rider W: The One Who Continues After Z (小説 仮面ライダーW ～Zを継ぐ者～, Shōsetsu Kamen Raidā Daburu ~Zetto o Tsugu Mono~), written by Riku Sanjo, is part of a series of spin-off novel adaptions of the Heisei Era Kamen Riders. Phillip takes up Shotaro's job in solving cases after he becomes sick. Phillip uses Kamen Rider W Fang Joker and fights alongside Kamen Rider Accel, however the Dopants get tougher and force Philip to become a Kamen Rider himself: Kamen Rider Cyclone. The novel was released on November 30, 2012. The novel takes place between episodes 32 and 33.

== Fuuto PI ==
Fuuto PI (風都探偵, Fūto Tantei) is a manga sequel that has been serialized in Big Comic Spirits weekly magazine since August 7, 2017. Riku Sanjo, the main writer for the original series, was in charge of the manga's scripts, Masaki Sato drew the manga, Toei producer Hideaki Tsukada supervised the manga, and Katsuya Terada was credited for creature designs.

An anime adaptation celebrates the 50th anniversary of the Kamen Rider series and began airing in August 2022. The story is set after Kamen Rider W Returns: Kamen Rider Accel. The series will be streamed in English by Funimation. Some of the cast who has previously voiced their characters in the video game Kamen Rider: Memory of Heroez reprises their roles.

== Cast ==
- Shotaro Hidari (左 翔太郎, Hidari Shōtarō): Renn Kiriyama (桐山 漣, Kiriyama Ren)
- Philip (フィリップ, Firippu): Masaki Suda (菅田 将暉, Suda Masaki)
- Akiko Narumi (鳴海 亜樹子, Narumi Akiko): Hikaru Yamamoto (山本 ひかる, Yamamoto Hikaru)
- Ryu Terui (照井 竜, Terui Ryū): Minehiro Kinomoto (木ノ本 嶺浩, Kinomoto Minehiro)
- Mikio Jinno (刃野 幹夫, Jinno Mikio): Takeshi Nadagi (なだぎ 武, Nadagi Takeshi)
- Shun Makura (真倉 俊, Makura Shun): Shingo Nakagawa (中川 真吾, Nakagawa Shingo)
- Watcherman (ウォッチャマン, Wotchaman): Nasubi (なすび)
- Santa (サンタちゃん, Santachan): Zennosuke Fukkin (腹筋 善之介, Fukkin Zen'nosuke)
- Queen (クイーン, Kuīn): Tomomi Itano (板野 友美, Itano Tomomi; AKB48)
- Elizabeth (エリザベス, Erizabesu): Tomomi Kasai (河西 智美, Kasai Tomomi; AKB48)
- Ryubee Sonozaki (園咲 琉兵衛, Sonozaki Ryūbee): Minori Terada (寺田 農, Terada Minori)
- Saeko Sonozaki (園咲 冴子, Sonozaki Saeko): Ami Namai (生井 亜実, Namai Ami)
- Wakana Sonozaki (園咲 若菜, Sonozaki Wakana): Rin Asuka (飛鳥 凛, Asuka Rin)
- Kirihiko Sudo/Sonozaki (須藤／園咲 霧彦, Sudō/Sonozaki Kirihiko): Yuki Kimisawa (君沢 ユウキ, Kimisawa Yūki)
- Shinkuro Isaka (井坂 深紅郎, Isaka Shinkurō): Tomoyuki Dan (檀 臣幸, Dan Tomoyuki)
- Jun Kazu (加頭 順, Kazu Jun): Gong Teyu (コン・テユ, Kon Teyu)

=== Voice cast ===
- Smilodon Dopant (スミロドン・ドーパント, Sumirodon Dōpanto): Yasuhiro Takato (高戸 靖広, Takato Yasuhiro)
- Shroud (シュラウド, Shuraudo): Naoko Kouda (幸田 直子, Kōda Naoko)
- Gaia Memories (ガイアメモリ, Gaia Memori), Narrator: Fumihiko Tachiki (立木 文彦, Tachiki Fumihiko)

=== Guest cast ===
- Marina Tsumura (津村 真里奈, Tsumura Marina; 1–2): Meibi Yamanouchi (山内 明日, Yamanouchi Meibi)
- Taizo Kaga (加賀 泰造, Kaga Taizō; 3–4): Tatsuya Gashuin (我修院 達也, Gashūin Tatsuya)
- Chizuru Hoshino (星野 千鶴, Hoshino Chizuru; 7–8): Reina Fujii (藤井 玲奈, Fujii Reina)
- Dango Inamoto (稲本 弾吾, Inamoto Dango; 7–8): Win Morisaki (森崎 ウィン, Morisaki Win)
- Ikari (伊刈; 7–8): Jin Katagiri (片桐 仁, Katagiri Jin)
- Teacher (7–8): Hiroshi Watari (渡 洋史, Watari Hiroshi)
- Mai Asakawa (浅川 麻衣, Asakawa Mai; 9–10, 14): Eri Otoguro (乙黒 えり, Otoguro Eri)
- Kurosu (黒須; 11–12): Koji
- Young girl (12): Hikari Kajiwara (梶原 ひかり, Kajiwara Hikari)
- Motoko Saeki (佐伯 素子, Saeki Motoko; 13–14): Shion Nakamaru (中丸 シオン, Nakamaru Shion)
- Kenji Kurata (倉田 剣児, Kurata Kenji; 15–16): Koichiro Nishi (西 興一朗, Nishi Kōichirō)
- Makiko Katahira (片平 真紀子, Katahira Makiko; 19–20): Itsumi Osawa (大沢 逸美, Ōsawa Itsumi)
- Kiyoshi Katahira (片平 清, Katahira Kiyoshi; 19, 20):Kento Shibuya (渋谷 謙人, Shibuya Kento)
- Aya Kujo (九条 綾, Kujō Aya; 21–22): Ayumi Kinoshita (木下 あゆ美, Kinoshita Ayumi)
- Ken Akutsu (阿久津 憲, Akutsu Ken; 21): Hiroo Otaka (大高 洋夫, Ōtaka Hiroo)
- Herself (23–24): Aya Kamiki (上木 彩矢, Kamiki Aya)
- Himself (23–24): TAKUYA
- Ichirouta Oonuki (大貫 一朗太, Ōnuki Ichirōta; 23–24): Ichirou Mizuki (水木 一郎, Mizuki Ichirō)
- DJ Hurry Kenn (Voice; 23–24)
- Sachio Sawada (沢田 さちお, Sawada Sachio; 25–26): Moro Morooka (モロ 師岡)
- Lily Shirogane (リリィ白銀, Riryi Shirogane; 27–28): Nao Nagasawa (長澤 奈央, Nagasawa Nao)
- Himeka Yukimura (雪村 姫香, Yukimura Himeka; 29–30): Natsuko Aso (麻生 夏子, Asō Natsuko)
- Kyūzō of the Turret (櫓の久蔵, Yagura no Kyūzō; 29): Seizō Fukumoto (福本 清三, Fukumoto Seizō)
- Sokichi Narumi (鳴海 荘吉, Narumi Sōkichi; 31): Kōji Kikkawa (吉川 晃司, Kikkawa Kōji; Photograph)
- Yukie Sudo (須藤 雪絵, Sudō Yukie; 33–34): Kaoru Hirata (平田 薫, Hirata Kaoru)
- Grasshopper Woman (イナゴの女, Inago no Onna; 37–38): Minami Tsukui (佃井 皆実, Tsukui Minami)
- Ai Nijimura (虹村 あい, Nijimura Ai; 39–40): Erika Yazawa (谷澤 恵里香, Yazawa Erika)
- Toru Kawai (川相 透, Kawai Tōru; 39–40): Naoki Kawano (川野 直輝, Kawano Naoki)
- Yoshie Goto (後藤 良枝, Goto Yoshie; 43, 44) Ryoko Yui (遊井 亮子, Yui Ryoko)
- Kyoko Todoroki (轟 響子, Todoroki Kyōko; 45–46): Yuka Hirata (平田 裕香, Hirata Yuka)
- Neon Ulsland (ネオン・ウルスランド, Neon Urusurando; 47–48): Maria Theresa Gow (マリア・テレサ・ガウ, Maria Teresa Gau)
- Yui Aoyama (青山 唯, Aoyama Yui; 49): Yui Koike (小池 唯, Koike Yui)
- Shiro Endo (遠藤 士郎, Endō Shirō; 49): Shohei Nanba (南羽 翔平, Nanba Shōhei)

== Songs ==
Opening theme

- "W-B-X (W-Boiled Extreme)"
  - Lyrics: Shoko Fujibayashi
  - Composition: Shuhei Naruse
  - Arrangement: TAKUYA, Shuhei Naruse
  - Artist: Aya Kamiki w TAKUYA (上木彩矢 w TAKUYA, Kamiki Aya w TAKUYA)
  Read as "Double-B-X ~Double Boiled Extreme~", the song is written by Fujibayashi and Naruse, who have contributed to the production of the highest peaking Heisei Kamen Rider Series theme songs "Climax Jump" (#2), "Break the Chain" (#3), and "Journey through the Decade" (#2) on the Oricon charts, performed by Kamiki and TAKUYA and was released on November 11, 2009. In its first week of release, it peaked at #8 on the Oricon Weekly Charts.
  Episodes 28 and 49 used the song as the ending theme.

Insert themes

- "Cyclone Effect"
  - Lyrics: Shoko Fujibayashi
  - Composition: AYANO (of FULL AHEAD)
  - Arrangement: Labor Day
  - Artist: Labor Day
  - Episodes: 3–6, 9, 21, 23–25, 45
  The first of the Kamen Rider W ending themes "Cyclone Effect" was released on November 25, 2009, on a maxi single. While the song is intended to be the theme for Kamen Rider W CycloneJoker, the song is also played during other forms' fight scenes. The vocalist is Sunaho Takeuchi (竹内 沙帆, Takeuchi Sunaho) of Utayacco with AYANO of FULL AHEAD on guitar.
- "Free your Heat"
  - Lyrics: Shoko Fujibayashi
  - Composition & Arrangement: Ryo (of defspiral)
  - Artist: Galveston 19
  - Episodes: 10–11, 13, 19–21
  This theme for Kamen Rider W HeatMetal was first played on the Wind Wave radio show. It later entered circulation as one of the three ending themes, released on CD on December 16, 2009. The band is composed of the members of the band everset, with Tsuyoshi Himura (緋村 剛, Himura Tsuyoshi) on vocals, tatsuo on guitar, and Tenji Nagano (長野 典二, Nagano Tenji) on bass.
- "Finger on the Trigger"
  - Lyrics: Shoko Fujibayashi & Otoko Usagi
  - Composition & Arrangement: Junichi "IGAO" Igarashi
  - Artist: Florida Keys
  - Episodes: 7–8, 14, 16, 18, 23, 30, 39
  This theme for Kamen Rider W LunaTrigger was featured briefly on the Wind Wave internet radio shows shortly before premiering in the series. This song was released on CD on December 16, 2009. The band is composed of members of the band Shamo (軍鶏), featuring vocals by Yosh and U-Sagi with IGAO on keyboard.
- "Naturally"
  - Lyrics: Shoko Fujibayashi
  - Composition & Arrangement: Shuhei Naruse
  - Artist: Wakana Sonozaki (Rin Asuka)
  - Episodes: 13–14, 17
  Wakana Sonozaki (Rin Asuka) also has her own single titled "Naturally" that debuted during her talk show. It was later featured in the television series during a story arc that focused on her (Shotaro and Philip, as fans of her show, know all the lyrics and the accompanying dance). "Naturally" was released on CD on January 27, 2010.
- "Leave all Behind"
  - Lyrics: Shoko Fujibayashi
  - Composition: Ryo (of defspiral)
  - Arrangement: Wilma-Sidr
  - Artist: Wilma-Sidr
  - Episodes: 22, 44
  This new song premiered on the FU-TO HIT on GROOVE show which marked the day of Kamen Rider Accel's appearance in the series. In episode 22, it is first used as Kamen Rider Accel's ending theme. It was released on CD on April 28, 2010. The members of Wilma-Sidr are the current line up of defspiral, previously known as Transtic Nerve and the Underneath.
- "Love♡Wars"
  - Lyrics: Shoko Fujibayashi
  - Composition & Arrangement: Shuhei Naruse
  - Artist: Queen & Elizabeth (Tomomi Itano & Tomomi Kasai)
  - Episodes: 23–24
  As part of their involvement in the Kamen Rider W production, Tomomi Itano and Tomomi Kasai of AKB48 released the song "Love♡Wars" on March 31, 2010, as four different CDs, three of which contain DVDs with a music video, trading cards, and a special bonus track. The fourth is a CD-only release without the bonus track(s) available on the other three discs. The song debuted in the show during episodes 23 & 24 in which their characters Queen & Elizabeth are performing in a competition akin to Pop Idol to get a major release. In its first week of release it sold over 21,000 copies, reaching #4 on the Oricon Weekly Rankings.
- "Nobody's Perfect"
  - Lyrics: Gorō Matsui
  - Composition: Sokichi Narumi (Koji Kikkawa)
  - Arrangement: Hiroaki Sugawara
  - Artist: Sokichi Narumi (Koji Kikkawa)
  - Episodes: 32, 38, 41–42, Movie War Core
  Koji Kikkawa recorded "Nobody's Perfect" as Kamen Rider Skull's theme song. A single (as a CD single and a CD+DVD version) was released on June 30, 2010. Although it is not used as an ending theme, the song is featured in several episodes and was used as the instrumental theme for the final episode preview. The song's music video, directed by Ryuta Tasaki, tells a side story with Philip finding a book entitled "Nobody's Perfect". He views a number of flashbacks involving Sokichi Narumi and his past as Kamen Rider Skull, taking on a case with Shotaro.
- "Extreme Dream"
  - Lyrics: Shoko Fujibayashi
  - Composition: AYANO (of FULL AHEAD)
  - Arrangement: Labor Day
  - Artist: Labor Day
  - Episodes: 46, 48
  On the June 13, 2010 episode of FU-TO HIT on GROOVE, Labor Day debuted their newest song for the series: "Extreme Dream". The song was not featured in the television series until 2 months later.
- "Cyclone Effect (acoustic edit.)"
  - Lyrics: Shoko Fujibayashi
  - Composition: AYANO (of FULL AHEAD)
  - Arrangement: Labor Day
  - Artist: Labor Day
  - Episodes: 48
  This variation of "Cyclone Effect" is first heard in the background of episode 21. The song is later used as the ending theme for episode 48.

During the events of episode 8, the song "Glorious Street (Eikō no Michi)" (Glorious street 〜栄光の道〜) by Florida Keys was played within the show by a character. During episodes 23 and 24, the character Jimmy Nakata performed an original song titled "Fuuto Tower" (風都タワー, Fūto Tawā); this song was included as a bonus track on the standard DVD release version of the "Love♡Wars" single. During episode 23, Shotaro and Philip cover "Finger on the Trigger" in the Fuuuuuutic Idol contest. In addition to these songs, Head Wind One-Game Match!! DJs Tsuyoshi & Ayano (つよしとあやの, Tsuyoshi to Ayano) have written and performed the song "WIND WAVE" as a theme song for the fictional radio station. This song, as well as "Glorious Street (Eikō no Michi)", and "Extreme Dream" have been included in the complete CD box set.

The bands that perform the series' ending themes are also featured in the programs as being local bands in the fictional city of Fuuto: crossover rock band Labor Day's "Cyclone Effect", heavy metal/hard rock band Galveston 19's "Free Your Heat", and hip-hop group Florida Keys' "Finger on the Trigger". Each of these bands is named after a major early 20th century hurricane: the 1935 Labor Day hurricane, the 1900 Galveston hurricane, and the 1919 Florida Keys hurricane. The newest group, the visual kei band Wilma-Sidr, is named after Hurricane Wilma and Cyclone Sidr.

- "FINALLY"
  - Artist: Melissa (hikaru yamamoto)
- "Love♡Wars acoustic edit"
  - Artist: Queen & Elizabeth
- "Finger on the Trigger (heisei best Re-edit Ver.)
  - Artist: Shotaro Hidari & Philip
- "Glorious street 〜栄光の道〜"
- "fuuto tower"
- "WIND WAVE"
- "HEART∞BREAKER"
  - Artist: Daikichi (maki oguro & koji kikkawa)
- "W"
  - Artist: Mitsuru matsuoka
- "cod-E ～Eの暗号～"
  - Artist: Shopia

== Parodies ==
Episode 295-A of Sgt. Frog titled "Keroro, The Two of Us are One Kerororm" (ケロロ 二人が一人ケロロ〜ム! であります, Keroro Futari ga Hitori Kerorōmu! de Arimasu) features the members of the Keroro Platoon finding an artifact that allows two of them to combine into a single Keroro, each with new powers. The episode title is based on Kamen Rider W's catchphrase and the resultant transformation resembles that of Kamen Rider W (the characters appear to be split down the middle, with one side being, for example, Keroro and the other Tamama).
