= Naoko Kouda =

Japanese voice actress (born 1959)

- 幸田 直子
- Born: Yumiko Satō; March 22, 1959 (age 67); Hokkaidō, Japan
- Education: Nihon University
- Occupations: Voice actor, actress
- Years active: 1979-present
- Agent: Re-max

Yumiko Satō (佐藤 由美子, Satō Yumiko; born March 22, 1959 in Hokkaidō), better known by the stage name Naoko Kouda (幸田 直子, Kōda Naoko; previously credited with the Kanji 幸田 奈穂子), is a Japanese voice actress who works for Mausu Promotion. She graduated from Nihon University College of Art.

== Filmography ==
=== Anime ===
- Hidamari no Ki (2000) (Manjiro's Mother)
- Lupin III: Bye-Bye Lady Liberty (xxxx) (Judy)
- Saint Tail (xxxx) (Rosemary Sendou)
- Kuromajo-san ga Toru!! (2013) (Chikako Kurotori)
- Girls Band Cry (2024) (Tendou Awa)

=== Game ===
- Valkyrie Profile (xxxx) (Lorenta, Platina's mother, Old woman at Hai Lan)
- Enemy Zero (xxxx) (Kimberly)
- Shinobido: Way of the Ninja (xxxx) (Lady Sadame)
- Onimusha 3: Demon Siege (xxxx) (Donna Vega)

=== Tokusatsu ===
- Juken Sentai Gekiranger (2007) (Sea Fist Demon (Confrontation Beast Jelly-Fist) Rageku (eps. 1, 15 - 35, 49))
- Kamen Rider W (2009) (Shroud (Fumine Sonozaki) (eps. 19 - 49))
- Kamen Rider × Kamen Rider OOO & W Featuring Skull: Movie War Core (2010) (Shroud (Fumine Sonozaki))
- Kamen Rider Ghost (2015) (Katchu Gamma (ep. 21 - 22))

=== Dubbing ===
==== Live-action ====
- Sigourney Weaver
  - Alien (Ellen Ripley)
  - Aliens (Ellen Ripley)
  - Alien 3 (Ellen Ripley)
  - Alien Resurrection (Ellen Ripley)
  - Snow White: A Tale of Terror (Lady Claudia Hoffman)
  - Chappie (Michelle Bradley)
- Billie Whitelaw
  - The Omen (Mrs. Baylock (2nd dub))
  - Merlin (Auntie Ambrosia)
  - Quills (Madame LeClerc)
- The 33 (María Segovia (Juliette Binoche)
- 9-1-1 (Athena Grant Nash (Angela Bassett))
- Angels in America (Nurse Emily, the Homeless Woman, the Angel of America (Emma Thompson))
- Avengers: Doomsday (Mystique (Rebecca Romijn))
- Black Panther (Ramonda (Angela Bassett))
- Black Panther: Wakanda Forever (Ramonda (Angela Bassett))
- Dallas (Sue Ellen Ewing (Linda Gray))
- The Dark Crystal (Aughra, SkekEkt)
- Dick Tracy (Breathless Mahoney (Madonna))
- ER (Dr. Abby Keaton (Glenne Headly))
- Everything Everywhere All at Once (Deirdre Beaubeirdre (Jamie Lee Curtis))
- The Ghost Writer (Ruth Lang (Olivia Williams))
- Halloween (Laurie Strode (Jamie Lee Curtis))
- Halloween Kills (Laurie Strode (Jamie Lee Curtis))
- Halloween II (1988 NTV edition) (Laurie Strode (Jamie Lee Curtis))
- The Hand That Rocks the Cradle (Mrs. Mott/Peyton Flanders (Rebecca De Mornay))
- Happiest Season (Tipper (Mary Steenburgen))
- Harry Potter film series (Sybill Trelawney (Emma Thompson))
- The Hole in the Ground (Noreen Brady (Kati Outinen))
- Indiana Jones and the Last Crusade (Elsa Schneider (Alison Doody))
- The Intern (Fiona (Rene Russo))
- Internal Affairs (Kathleen Avilla (Nancy Travis))
- Jerry Maguire (Laurel Boyd (Bonnie Hunt))
- Labyrinth (Junk Lady)
- Leap of Faith (Jane Larson (Debra Winger))
- Married to the Mob (Angela de Marco (Michelle Pfeiffer))
- Melrose Place (Amanda Woodward (Heather Locklear))
- The Missing (Gemma Webster (Keeley Hawes))
- Mission: Impossible (1999 Fuji TV edition) (Sarah Davies (Kristin Scott Thomas))
- MotherFatherSon (Maggie Barns (Sinéad Cusack))
- Passenger 57 (Sabrina Ritchie (Elizabeth Hurley))
- Practical Magic (Sally Owens (Sandra Bullock))
- Pretty Woman (Vivian Ward (Julia Roberts))
- Ready or Not (Becky Le Domas (Andie MacDowell))
- The River (Mae Garvey (Sissy Spacek))
- The Running Man (1990 TV Asahi edition) (Amber Méndez (María Conchita Alonso))
- Spin City (Caitlin Moore (Heather Locklear))
- Thumbsucker (Audrey Cobb (Tilda Swinton))
- To the Bone (Susan (Carrie Preston))
- Twin Dragons (Tong Sum (Nina Li Chi))
- X-Men (Mystique (Rebecca Romijn))
- X2 (Mystique (Rebecca Romijn))
- X-Men: The Last Stand (Mystique (Rebecca Romijn))
- Young Sheldon (Victoria MacElroy (Valerie Mahaffey))

==== Animation ====
- Cybersix (Elaine)
- Kung Fu Panda 4 (The Chameleon)
- Les Mondes Engloutis (Loria)
- X-Men: The Animated Series (Emma Frost)
- Looney Tunes (Sylvester's Mother)
