= List of Kamen Rider W episodes =

The episodes of Kamen Rider W have two titles per episode matching the overall motif of the number two: a story arc title and a subtitle directly relating to the story of that episode. The Latin letter in the story arc title has a double meaning: the name of a Kamen Rider, Dopant, or an important character featured in the story arc and another word that indicates the theme of the arc. The series follows the hardboiled crime fiction genre, although the comedic nature of the series makes it more half-boiled, as its protagonist is described.

== Episodes ==
No.	Title	Double meaning	Directed by	Written by	Original release date
1	"The W Search/Two Halves of One Detective"; Transliteration: "W no Kensaku/Tantei wa Futari de Hitori" (Japanese: Ｗの検索／探偵は二人で一人)	Kamen Rider W Word	Ryuta Tasaki	Riku Sanjo	September 6, 2009
In a flashback, private detective Sokichi Narumi is killed while rescuing Philip and passes his duties to his protégé Shotaro Hidari. (Note: As depicted in flashbacks in Kamen Rider × Kamen Rider W & Decade: Movie War 2010.) A year later, in the city of Fuuto, Hidari is visited by his new boss and Sokichi's daughter, Akiko Narumi, who came to find her missing father. Not wanting to hurt her feelings, he hides the truth from her while accepting a case from his childhood friend Marina Tsumura, who wants to find her missing boyfriend, Yousuke Togawa. With Akiko tailing him against his will, Hidari learns from his friend and Fuuto Police Department (FPD) Detective Mikio Jinno that Togawa's former workplace, Windscale, was destroyed by the Magma Dopant, who later mounts a failed attack on Hidari and Akiko. Later that night, he tells her to leave, but she stumbles into his secret garage and meets his partner Philip. While Shotaro explains how the monstrous Dopants are derived from Gaia Memories to her, Philip conducts research into the assailant. The next day, he and Hidari find Togawa, who transforms into the Magma Dopant. Undeterred, the pair transform into Kamen Rider W to defeat him and destroy his Magma Memory before Togawa is suddenly taken by the T-Rex Dopant.
2	"The W Search/Those Who Make the City Grieve"; Transliteration: "W no Kensaku/Machi o Nakaseru Mono" (Japanese: Ｗの検索／街を泣かせるもの)	Kamen Rider W Word	Ryuta Tasaki	Riku Sanjo	September 13, 2009
Hidari and Philip pursue the T-Rex Dopant, only to lose it and find Togawa dead. After reluctantly telling Tsumura what happened, Hidari works to identify the T-Rex Dopant by visiting his informant "Watcherman" and the site of Togawa's last attack, from which he finds an article of Windscale clothing and deduces Togawa and the T-Rex Dopant were working together. Using Hidari's clues, Philip identifies Tsumura as the T-Rex Dopant. Refusing to believe this, Hidari argues with Philip before confronting Tsumura, who reveals she was fired by Windscale and wanted revenge on them and Togawa to elicit his sympathy. Upon realizing he already called the authorities, she transforms into the T-Rex Dopant to attack them and Hidari until Philip rescues him. Once the pair reconcile, they transform to fight and eventually defeat Tsumura, who is subsequently arrested. Meanwhile, Gaia Memory dealer Kirihiko Sudo receives his own Gaia Memory from the Sonozaki family as an engagement present.
3	"Don't Touch the M/How to Get to Heaven"; Transliteration: "M ni Te o Dasu na/Tengoku e no Ikikata" (Japanese: Ｍに手を出すな／天国への行き方)	Money; Memories	Satoshi Morota	Riku Sanjo	September 20, 2009
Hidari argues with Akiko over her interfering with his investigative methods until Philip tunes into the Wind Wave radio station to play the Healing Princess radio show, during which its host Wakana Sonozaki discusses rumors about the Million Colosseo casino, and two distraught parents come to the Narumi Detective Office for help in investigating their daughter Yuko Izumi, who has been acting strangely recently. Akiko inadvertently causes Hidari to lose Yuko, so he goes to Watcherman, who leads him to Goro Murasame, who recently lost everything at Million Colosseo. Murasame is later attacked by the casino's owner, Taizo Kaga, who transforms into the Money Dopant. Hidari and Philip nearly defeat Kaga, but are overpowered by a mysterious Dopant, who helps Kaga escape. While searching for clues connecting the casino to Yuko, Hidari learns of fake bus tickets that lead there. Seeing Akiko join Yuko in traveling to the casino, he follows them until he is attacked by Kaga again. Hidari and Philip re-engage him until he reveals he has trapped people in Life Coins.
4	"Don't Touch the M/Play With a Joker"; Transliteration: "M ni Te o Dasu na/Jōkā de Shōbu" (Japanese: Ｍに手を出すな／ジョーカーで勝負)	Money; Memories	Satoshi Morota	Riku Sanjo	September 27, 2009
Narrowly surviving Kaga's attacks, Hidari glimpses memories of Philip's family as he obsessively attempts to find them. Hidari attempts to comfort him until Akiko calls him, having infiltrated Million Colosseo to tail Yuko, who lost all of her money before Kaga trapped her in a Life Coin. Hearing Akiko accidentally expose herself, Hidari and Philip travel to the casino, where Philip challenges Kaga to games of chance to win the Life Coins and save Akiko. Using his deduction skill and having researched gambling beforehand, he wins most of Kaga's Life Coins until he mentions the idea of family, causing Philip to hesitate. Hidari tags himself in and challenges Kaga to a winner-take-all game of old maid. Using his Rider powers to link his mind with Philip's, Hidari successfully defeats Kaga. Enraged, Kaga escapes, but Hidari and Philip pursue and defeat him, freeing his victims from the Life Coins. Throughout the battle, Philip comes to accept Hidari and Akiko as his family. Meanwhile, Wakana transforms into the Claydoll Dopant to test Kirihiko as the Nasca Dopant. After defeating her, he marries her older sister Saeko Sonozaki.
5	"The Girl... A/Papa Is a Kamen Rider"; Transliteration: "Shōjo... A/Papa wa Kamen Raidā" (Japanese: 少女…Ａ／パパは仮面ライダー)	Anomalocaris; Asuka	Naosuke Kurosawa	Riku Sanjo	October 4, 2009
Fuuto councilwoman Miyabi Kusuhara holds a press conference to present her plans for the construction of a second Fuuto Tower until a Dopant attempts to assassinate her. Having been hired as her bodyguard, Hidari gets her to safety before joining Philip to find the Dopant, during which Miyabi's daughter Asuka calls them "Papa". Failing to find the Dopant, Akiko recovers one of the monster's bullets for Philip to study while Hidari resumes his bodyguard duties. The next day, Hidari escorts Miyabi and her entourage to the area they designated for the tower. However, its owner Genzo Takamura refuses to let them through. As the group leaves, Miyabi reveals to Hidari her husband Daizaburo was planning to build the tower before he was murdered last year and kept the truth from Asuka. As Philip determines the attacker is Takamura via the Anomalocaris Memory, the Dopant mounts another assassination attempt. Hidari and Philip transform to fight and defeat the Anomalocaris Dopant, but it is revealed to be Takamura's subordinate before the real Dopant attacks.
6	"The Girl... A/The Price of Lying"; Transliteration: "Shōjo... A/Uso no Daishō" (Japanese: 少女…Ａ／嘘の代償)	Anomalocaris; Asuka	Naosuke Kurosawa	Riku Sanjo	October 11, 2009
As the Kusuharas flee, Hidari and Philip repel the Anomalocaris Dopant. Worried for his charges' safety, Hidari chooses not to pursue the monster in favor of telling Miyabi the dangers of lying to her daughter. However, he later becomes conflicted on the matter after struggling to decide if he should reveal his secret identity to Asuka. The next day, Philip researches Daizaburo while Hidari starts to tell Asuka the truth until the Anomalocaris Dopant kidnaps her. Using a tracker he planted on her, Hidari pursues the monster, but is attacked by Kirihiko, who wishes to fight him. Hidari and Philip narrowly defeat the new foe, though Philip is knocked unconscious while Hidari resumes his pursuit, which brings him to Takamura's factory. He sees Miyabi arriving as well, having been lured there by a ransom text. Once Akiko revives Philip, he is able to help Hidari defeat Takamura and destroy his Anomalocaris Memory before he can kill the Kusuharas. Leaving Takamura for the police, Philip helps Hidari maintain the white lie that they are Daizaburo for Asuka. Meanwhile, Sonozaki patriarch Ryubee recognizes the potential threat that Hidari and Philip pose to his work.
7	"Find the C/Philip Can't Stand It"; Transliteration: "C o Sagase/Firippu wa Sore o Gaman Dekinai" (Japanese: Ｃを探せ／フィリップはそれを我慢できない)	Cockroach; Clients	Ryuta Tasaki	Naruhisa Arakawa	October 18, 2009
While conducting research in the metaphysical "Gaia Library", Philip comes across a locked book titled the Heaven's Tornado, a street dance connected to Fuuto dancer Dango Inamoto. Realizing he cannot research this further, Philip leaves the office to find him, with Akiko in tow. Upon finding Inamoto, Philip asks him to demonstrate the Heaven's Tornado, but Inamoto refuses. Meanwhile, Hidari works on a case involving Kazehana High School, where he is attacked by the Cockroach Dopant. After Hidari calls Philip for help, they nearly defeat the monster until Akiko calls Philip regarding Inamoto, leading to an argument between him and Hidari that allows the Dopant to escape. Learning Inamoto is at Kazehana to re-connect with his former dance partner, Chizuru Hoshino, Philip and Akiko pursue him until they are attacked by the Smilodon Dopant, who seeks to capture Philip. Concurrently, Hidari meets with his high school informants, Queen and Elizabeth, who reveal the Cockroach Dopant's attacks are connected to the "Dark Bug Exterminator" website and Chizuru is being targeted. As Hidari locates Inamoto, Chizuru is attacked by the Cockroach Dopant, who reveals Inamoto wants her dead. Upon narrowly escaping his pursuer, Philip joins Hidari in fighting the Cockroach Dopant.
8	"Find the C/Dancing Hero"; Transliteration: "C o Sagase/Danshingu Hīrō" (Japanese: Ｃを探せ／ダンシングヒーロー)	Cockroach; Clients	Ryuta Tasaki	Naruhisa Arakawa	October 25, 2009
Despite being overwhelmed by the Cockroach Dopant, Hidari and Philip eventually drive him off before bringing Inamoto to the Narumi Detective Office, where he reveals he was the one who led Hidari to Kazehana and that he vented his rage on the Dark Bug Exterminator website after he broke up with Chizuru, who joined the Kazehana swim team without telling him. While Philip researches her in the Gaia Library, Hidari meets with his informant "Santa", who gives him a self-published manga, which leads him to dōjinshi artist Ikari. Concurrently, Philip finds Chizuru and forces her and Inamoto to reconcile. The pair initially argue until she reveals she took up swimming to perfect her dancing and that she still shares his dream of becoming a great dance team. They agree to show Philip the Heaven's Tornado, but Ikari attacks them, breaking Chizuru's leg and demanding Hidari and Philip's Rider powers. With help from Chizuru, Philip uses the Heaven's Tornado to defeat Ikari, destroy his Gaia Memory, and leave him for the police. Afterward, Inamoto and Chizuru invite the detectives to their latest dance performance. To Akiko's dismay, Philip throws away the invitation in favor of seeing Mount Fuji instead.
9	"The S Terror/The Maid Detective Witnessed It!"; Transliteration: "S na Senritsu/Meido Tantei wa Mita!" (Japanese: Ｓな戦慄／メイド探偵は見た！)	Sweets; Sonozaki	Takayuki Shibasaki	Riku Sanjo	November 8, 2009
As Akiko and Hidari argue over amassing bills, five clients arrive stating that their loved ones, all pâtissiers, have disappeared. After Philip learns all of the missing people worked at the Sonozaki family estate, Akiko goes undercover as a maid to investigate the manor and watch over one of the clients, Mai Asakawa, the Sonozakis' current pâtissier. A furious Hidari tries to talk Akiko out of it, nearly telling her of Sokichi's death, but is unable to do so and opts to infiltrate the manor. While on the premises, he encounters Kirihiko and assumes he is stalking Wakana before they both respond to Mai being attacked by living whipped cream. Hidari and Philip rescue Mai, discovering the culprit is the Sweets Dopant in the process, while Kirihiko joins the fray. Meanwhile, Akiko tails Ryubee, but he disappears from her line of sight and transforms into the Terror Dopant to address the commotion outside.
10	"The S Terror/The Great Detective's Daughter"; Transliteration: "S na Senritsu/Meitantei no Musume" (Japanese: Ｓな戦慄/名探偵の娘)	Sweets; Sonozaki	Takayuki Shibasaki	Riku Sanjo	November 15, 2009
Ryubee uses his fear-inducing powers to intervene in Hidari, Philip, Kirihiko, and the Sweets Dopant's fight, forcing all four to retreat. While attending to Mai, Akiko apologizes for leaving her alone while Hidari starts to tell her of Sokichi's belief in protecting a client at all costs until she runs off. He follows her to the Fuuto Museum, where he sees her talking to Ryubee and experiences a strange unnerving feeling around him. Later, while attending the Sonozakis' afternoon tea party, Akiko reveals herself to accuse fellow maid Fukumi Shirotsuka of being the Sweets Dopant and kidnapper due to her sweet tooth until Philip deduces the true culprit is a different maid named Yukiko Sasaki, who transforms into the Sweets Dopant to kidnap Mai and Akiko. Hidari and Philip transform and give chase, but are impeded by Kirihiko and Saeko as the Nasca and Taboo Dopants respectively. Despite being overpowered, the detectives eventually escape, rescue Mai and Akiko, and defeat Sasaki. After rescuing her victims and closing the case, Hidari chooses to delay telling Akiko what happened to Sokichi.
11	"The Revenge V/Infected Car"; Transliteration: "Fukushū no V/Kansensha" (Japanese: 復讐のＶ／感染車)	Virus; Vehicle	Satoshi Morota	Keiichi Hasegawa	November 22, 2009
After Akiko falls ill and calls Hidari an "idiot who never catches a cold", Philip becomes interested in the idea, unaware that it is an idiom. They subsequently learn of gang members being attacked by a mysterious SUV capable of phasing through and infecting them with a mysterious disease. Learning from Watcherman that the victims are connected to a chop shop street gang, Hidari questions their leader, Sachio Kurosu, until the criminal holds him at gunpoint, causing a fearful Akiko to drag Hidari away. Eventually, Philip theorizes the driver is Kōhei Yamamura, whose older sister Sachi was hospitalized and put into a coma after being hit by a car driven by Kurosu's gang. Believing Kōhei is a Dopant, Hidari locates and confronts him, but he runs off. Hidari then questions Sachi's fiancé Noriyuki Yushima before learning from Akiko that Kurosu is attempting to confront the SUV's driver. Hidari and Philip transform to save Kurosu and destroy the SUV, but find the wreckage empty before they are attacked by the Virus Dopant.
12	"The Revenge V/Grudge Beast"; Transliteration: "Fukushū no V/Onnenjū" (Japanese: 復讐のＶ／怨念獣)	Virus; Vehicle	Satoshi Morota	Keiichi Hasegawa	November 29, 2009
The Virus Dopant kills Kurosu before overpowering Hidari and Philip and fleeing. The next day, after reviewing Sachi's hit-and-run and the Virus Dopant's vehicular rampage, Hidari theorizes Yushima is the Dopant, only to find him being attacked by the monster. Upon rescuing him, it escapes once more. When Akiko suggests Sachi is the Dopant, Hidari proves skeptical. Nonetheless, Akiko and Philip visit the hospital where Sachi is being kept and successfully prove her theory. He concludes that during the accident, Sachi must have used the Virus Memory at the last minute, causing her consciousness to be transferred to her Dopant form, which is acting on her vengeful feelings. He visits her in the Gaia Library to confirm this, during which she reveals she bought the Virus Memory after catching Yushima cheating on her. Meanwhile, Hidari learns from Queen and Elizabeth that Yushima is a con artist before saving him from the Virus Dopant. As its power overtakes Sachi's personality, Hidari and Philip destroy the Dopant, freeing her consciousness. After closing the case, Hidari suddenly comes down with his own cold.
13	"The Q on the Radio/Targeted Princess"; Transliteration: "Redio de Q/Nerawareta Purinsesu" (Japanese: レディオでＱ／狙われたプリンセス)	Question; Queen	Hidenori Ishida	Keiichi Hasegawa	December 6, 2009
While hosting her radio show, Wakana receives a call from the mysterious "Mister Question", who turns into the Violence Dopant to destroy a nearby building. As Wind Wave DJ Motoko Saeki diverts media attention away from her, Hidari secretly offers his services to Wakana, but she refuses. Later that night, Wakana fights with Saeko over her duties to the Museum crime syndicate until Ryubee intervenes and sides with Saeko. Outnumbered, Wakana promises to address the incident. After Question calls Wakana again, Philip determines the amusement park is being targeted next. Hidari and Philip confront the Dopant, but he overpowers them. While regrouping, the detectives are suddenly visited by Wakana, who demands to see Philip. While hiding in the garage, he explains Question used an interview she participated in to plan his latest attack. She thanks him, unknowingly stimulating his memories. The next day, Wakana allows Hidari to escort her to a special show. When Question calls a third time, Philip deduces he is going to attack a building that obstructs her bedroom's view of Fuuto Tower. He and Hidari move to intercept the monster, but are attacked by Wakana and Question, who seemingly kills her.
14	"The Q on the Radio/Live Catastrophe"; Transliteration: "Redio de Q/Namahōsō Daipanikku" (Japanese: レディオでＱ／生放送大パニック)	Question; Queen	Hidenori Ishida	Keiichi Hasegawa	December 13, 2009
As Question escapes, Hidari and Philip start to pursue until Wakana uses her powers to revive herself and leaves to focus on her next show. When Question calls once more without providing hints about his next target, Philip deduces the stalker is someone she knows. She later sneaks out to talk to Philip and relates her history, wherein Saeko would take out her anger towards Ryubee on Wakana, though her now-missing younger brother Raito helped her cope. Philip and Wakana soon deduce Question is her manager Tsuyoshi Ageo. Confronting him with Philip and Hidari's help, Wakana demands to know how Ageo got his powers. He reveals he has always loved her and someone gave him the Violence Memory before Hidari and Philip eventually defeat him. Meanwhile, Wakana confronts Motoko, who admits that she bought the Violence Memory and manipulated Ageo to eliminate Wakana. Wakana transforms into her Dopant form in front of her to take revenge, but stops due to Raito and Philip's words. Motoko attempts to publicly expose Wakana, but Kirihiko arrives to kill Motoko. Wakana discards her Claydoll Memory, but Ryubee picks it up.
15	"The F Afterglow/Burglary Rider"; Transliteration: "F no Zankō/Gōtō Raidā" (Japanese: Ｆの残光／強盗ライダー)	Fang; Fake	Takayuki Shibasaki	Riku Sanjo	December 20, 2009
The Narumi Detective Office is approached by Fuyumi Aso, who asks them to find a "Kamen Rider". Believing the task will be easy, the detectives soon learn that their quarry is an imposter called the Arms Dopant. While foiling his attack on an armored truck, Hidari and Philip find a small piece of scrap metal the Dopant left behind. After Akiko and Hidari confront Aso about her connection to the Dopant, she reveals she is one half of the Twin Rose burglar duo and the Arms Dopant is her former partner Kenji Kurata. Despite this, Hidari continues working the case on the condition that Aso turns herself in afterward. Meanwhile, Philip struggles to find Kurata's hideout until Akiko determines the scrap metal's connection to the Sherwood Building. Hidari, Akiko, Aso, and an unwitting Philip travel there to confront Kurata, who entraps Akiko and Aso and partially negates Hidari's Rider powers. After Kurata reveals he was hired to locate Philip, Hidari tells him to flee. However, Philip is met by Saeko, who identifies him as Raito, the "Child of Fate".
16	"The F Afterglow/Recover Your Partner"; Transliteration: "F no Zankō/Aibō o Torimodose" (Japanese: Ｆの残光／相棒をとりもどせ)	Fang; Fake	Takayuki Shibasaki	Riku Sanjo	January 3, 2010
When Philip refuses to go with her, Saeko tries to kidnap him, but he escapes with help from the living Fang Memory before searching for Aso, who Kurata had released. Recognizing her refusal to give up on him, Philip resolves to save Hidari. Despite his protests, Philip uses the Fang Memory to transform, but temporarily goes on a rampage until Hidari uses their mental link to help bring Philip back to his senses. Now in control, the pair use the Fang Memory's powers to defeat Kurata and drive off Saeko. With Philip's body unable to continue, the detectives switch places so Hidari can pursue her. However, Kirihiko, having acquired new powers, arrives to rescue her. After restoring their heroic reputation, Hidari and Philip close the Kurata case, though Hidari worries the Dopant crime wave will escalate.
17	"Farewell N/Memory Kids"; Transliteration: "Saraba N yo/Memori Kizzu" (Japanese: さらばＮよ／メモリキッズ)	Nasca; Naïveté	Satoshi Morota	Keiichi Hasegawa	January 10, 2010
Hidari and Kirihiko stumble onto each other at the Barber Kaze barbershop, deduce each other's identities, and fight until the barbershop owner calls for Hidari's help in finding his missing daughter Akane Egusa. Taking the case, Hidari, Philip, and Akiko learn from Queen and Elizabeth that Akane was last seen with delinquents underneath a freeway overpass. When Hidari and Akiko find them, Akane's friend Toma Fujikawa reveals the Bird Memory and passes it to his friend Yuichi Kanamura, who transforms into the Bird Dopant. Hidari and Philip fight him until Yuichi changes back and gives the Bird Memory back to Toma, who escapes with Akane while Yuichi collapses in pain. Having seen the ordeal, Kirihiko confronts Saeko over using Gaia Memories on children, though she assures him the matter will be addressed. At the hospital, Hidari talks to Yuichi's friend Yayoi Kubota, who says they initially used the Bird Memory for fun before Toma started attacking people. Tracking down Toma, Hidari stops him from hurting others before Philip joins him to defeat Toma, who also collapses from pain while the Memory remains intact. Kirihiko arrives to confirm that the Bird Memory has more than one user before fighting the detectives.
18	"Farewell N/The Friend with the Wind"; Transliteration: "Saraba N yo/Tomo wa Kaze to Tomo ni" (Japanese: さらばＮよ／友は風と共に)	Nasca; Naïveté	Satoshi Morota	Keiichi Hasegawa	January 17, 2010
Kirihiko nearly defeats Hidari and Philip before he suddenly collapses. Philip intends to finish him, but Hidari refuses. The combatants leave, with the detectives taking Toma to the hospital. Later that night, having recovered Akane, Philip deduces she is the Bird Memory's original owner. She reveals that she was struggling with completing a school event when a woman gave her the Gaia Memory to help her. As Hidari leaves to notify her father, she suddenly suffers from withdrawal, attacks Philip and Akiko, and unknowingly attaches a tracker to herself before escaping to confront Saeko. Meanwhile, Kirihiko meets with Ryubee, who reveals how he created the Gaia Memories and the Museum and willfully allowed Akane and her friends to use the Bird Memory. Incensed, Kirihiko threatens to kill Ryubee, but the latter reveals further that his powers are slowly killing him. Kirihiko escapes to help Hidari and Philip, who locate Akane after she recovers the Bird Memory. Kirihiko helps the detectives defeat her and destroy the Bird Memory before revealing the Museum's existence to them and staggering off. He calls Saeko, hoping she will run away with him. However, she kills him and takes the Nasca Memory.
19	"The I Doesn't Stop/That Guy's Name Is Accel"; Transliteration: "I ga Tomaranai/Yatsu no Na wa Akuseru" (Japanese: Ｉが止まらない／奴の名はアクセル)	Ice Age; Investigation	Hidenori Ishida	Riku Sanjo	January 24, 2010
Hidari is approached by FPD Superintendent, Ryu Terui, who requests his aid in investigating several frozen victims. An excited Akiko accepts on Hidari's behalf, forcing him to follow Terui. At the most recent crime scene, Terui finds a blue flower before he and Hidari head to the hospital to question a survivor, but find him being attacked by an icy Dopant. Terui attacks the monster with a large sword before Hidari and Philip take over while Terui tries to pursue a fleeing woman with a similar blue flower from earlier. Later that day, the detectives are shocked to find Terui entering the garage to reveal that he has been spying on them for some time and his intent to become a Kamen Rider. An annoyed Philip points him to a florist named Makiko Katahira. Hidari, Terui, and Akiko go to her flower shop, where her son Kiyoshi says Makiko frequents the amusement park. Upon arrival, Hidari and Akiko break off to find her while Terui is visited by his benefactor, Shroud, who gives him Rider powers. He subsequently uses them to repel the Dopant. Upon seeing Makiko holding the corresponding Gaia Memory, a vengeful Terui attempts to kill her.
20	"The I Doesn't Stop/Kamen Rider Style"; Transliteration: "I ga Tomaranai/Kamen Raidā no Ryūgi" (Japanese: Ｉが止まらない／仮面ライダーの流儀)	Ice Age; Investigation	Hidenori Ishida	Riku Sanjo	January 31, 2010
In flashbacks, Terui's family was attacked and killed by a cryokinetic Dopant. Before he died, his father revealed the monster's Gaia Memory starts with the letter "W". Not long after, Terui swore revenge and met Shroud, who gave him the means to seek it. In the present, Hidari and Philip narrowly stop Terui from killing Makiko, allowing her to escape. An enraged Terui reveals his quest before attempting to kill them until Akiko stops him and makes him leave. An intrigued Philip investigates Terui's history while Hidari goes to Watcherman for information on Makiko. As Terui tails Kiyoshi to locate her and mount another attempt on her life, Hidari and Philip intervene, revealing they discovered Makiko was protecting the real culprit, Kiyoshi. She pleads her son to stop, but he brushes her off and fights the Riders until Terui defeats him. While arresting him however, Terui discovers Kiyoshi possessed the IceAge Memory. Meanwhile, Wakana is forced back into the Museum's operations and is introduced to a benefactor and high-ranking member, Dr. Shinkuro Isaka, who she notes seems to instill more fear in her than Ryubee and possesses the Weather Memory.
21	"The T Returns/A Melody Not Intended for Women"; Transliteration: "Kaettekita T/Onna ni wa Mukanai Merodi" (Japanese: 還ってきたＴ／女には向かないメロディ)	Triceratops; Transfer	Koichi Sakamoto	Keiichi Hasegawa	February 7, 2010
Terui and Jinno's partner Shun Makura tail Tsuyoshi Himuro, a corrupt FPD inspector who has been leaking information on Gaia Memory dealers. While preparing to arrest him, they are attacked by several dealers. After Makura accidentally knocks himself out, Terui defeats them before finding Himuro was killed by the Triceratops Dopant. While checking on Makura, Terui is approached by Detective Aya Kujo, a former FPD officer who transferred to the LAPD. Makura later approaches the Narumi Office to ask for their help in investigating Himuro's equally corrupt partner Ken Akutsu to impress Kujo. Hidari agrees so he can outshine Terui. The detectives and FPD locate Akutsu as he is being attacked by the Triceratops Dopant. After Hidari and Philip injure its leg and repel it, Akutsu escapes, dropping a keychain with the name "Catherine" on it. Terui finds and leaves it with Philip, who notices Kujo has an injured leg while the group eventually realize Catherine is the name of Akutsu's boat and find him there. Terui makes him confess that he and Himuro killed their fellow policeman Masaki Mizoguchi after he uncovered their corruption before Akutsu is killed by the Triceratops Dopant, who Terui and Philip realize is Kujo.
22	"The T Returns/The Man Who Can't Die"; Transliteration: "Kaettekita T/Shinanai Otoko" (Japanese: 還ってきたＴ／死なない男)	Triceratops; Transfer	Koichi Sakamoto	Keiichi Hasegawa	February 14, 2010
Exposed, Kujo reveals that she sought revenge on her former coworkers because she was in love with Mizoguchi. Terui asks her to stand down, but she refuses, saying her revenge is not complete yet before escaping. As Philip reminds Hidari of the Dopant Gaia Memories' corrupting influence, Terui receives a call from someone claiming to be his family's killer and leaves to meet with them, but stumbles into a trap. After reviewing the Mizoguchi case, Hidari finds Kujo and asks her to turn herself in before her Gaia Memory destroys her. She agrees, on the condition that he wait until tomorrow so he can capture one of the Museum's members. Later that night, Kujo confronts and overpowers Saeko, hoping for a position in the Museum. Impressed yet recognizing that Kujo has been corrupted by her Gaia Memory, Saeko tasks her with killing Jinno. The next day, Hidari is relieved to find Kujo seemingly turning herself in, but Philip realizes she incapacitated Terui and stops her from killing Jinno. Philip and Hidari battle a crazed Kujo, who reveals her revenge now extends to all of Fuuto, but are overpowered until Terui arrives to defeat her and destroy her Gaia Memory.
23	"L on the Lips/Singer-SongRider"; Transliteration: "Kuchibiru ni L o/Shingā Songuraidā" (Japanese: 唇にＬを／シンガーソングライダー)	Liar; Lyrics	Ryuta Tasaki	Riku Sanjo	February 21, 2010
Queen and Elizabeth hire Hidari to investigate the Fuuuuuutic Idol competition after they were eliminated in favor of an untalented street musician named Jimmy Nakata. Amidst the competition's second round, Hidari and Philip investigate Nakata and his sole fan Yukiho Sumida while Terui confronts the Liar Dopant outside the studio and seemingly defeats him. He later reports his findings to the Narumi Detective Office and reveals what he thinks is the monster's destroyed Gaia Memory, only to find he is holding garbage. As Philip helps Terui locate the real Gaia Memory, Hidari attempts to find Sumida, briefly finding poet and street calligrapher Sachio Sawada before "Santa" reveals Sumida's whereabouts. The detectives later learn that she hired the Liar Dopant to rig the competition to ensure Nakata wins. After the monster decides she is not paying him enough and stops helping her, the detectives are joined by Terui in fighting him until Sumida enters the fray, pleading the Dopant to continue helping Nakata, who arrives at the monster's suggestion and overhears the truth of his winning streak. Meanwhile, Saeko visits Isaka at his clinic after hours.
24	"L on the Lips/The Liar is You"; Transliteration: "Kuchibiru ni L o/Usotsuki wa Omae da" (Japanese: 唇にＬを／嘘つきはおまえだ)	Liar; Lyrics	Ryuta Tasaki	Riku Sanjo	February 28, 2010
Aware of Sumida and the Liar Dopant's ruse, Nakata breaks down in tears before the monster uses his Lie Needles to trick the Riders into fighting each other to cover his escape. As the Lie Needles wear off, Nakata storms off, leaving Sumida distraught. Under questioning, she reveals to the detectives that she met Nakata while in a depressed state and his singing made her happy. The Liar Dopant subsequently took advantage of her desire to return the favor by offering his services to her. While Terui and Philip review their fights with the monster, eventually deducing it is Sawada, Hidari finds and inspires Nakata. Upon realizing Sawada used one of Wakana's catchphrases, Philip contacts her for help in finding him. After she claims she will meet the Dopant on air, Sawada tails Wakana, but discovers too late he was lured into a trap before the Riders defeat him. Afterward, Nakata performs a song for Sumida. Though he is eliminated, the judges encourage him to work harder. The pair later meet backstage to confess their feelings for each other. Meanwhile, Isaka examines Saeko's Dopant form, suggesting she could overthrow Ryubee as head of the Museum and offers her his loyalty.
25	"The P's Game/The Doll Has Sticky Fingers"; Transliteration: "P no Yūgi/Ningyō wa Tekuse ga Warui" (Japanese: Ｐの遊戯／人形は手癖が悪い)	Puppeteer; Parent	Hidenori Ishida	Keiichi Hasegawa	March 7, 2010
Hidari discovers Shroud delivered a package to Philip containing blueprints for a new gadget they can use in their work. Meanwhile, Akiko receives a strange doll and encounters a mysterious girl named Riko, who gives her a list of addresses before disappearing. At the first address, Akiko meets Yuki Karakida, a literary critic who received her own doll hours ago. As she lambasts a new book called The Girl and the Dollhouse, the doll suddenly attacks Karakida and frames Akiko for it. Intent on proving her innocence, she evades Terui and the FPD to reach the second address, where another doll tries to attack her until Terui repels it and reveals two similar incidents occurred prior to Karakita's. With Philip's help, Akiko connects the dolls and victims to Keio Horinouchi, The Girl and the Dollhouse's author, and Riko, his daughter. When another doll attacks the police station, Hidari, Philip, and Terui defeat it, but realize it is not a Dopant. Noticing the real culprit, the Puppeteer Dopant, nearby, Hidari and Philip lure him out. Concurrently, Isaka convinces Saeko to talk about her grievances with Wakana. He later hypnotizes Wakana to gain permission to modify her Dopant form.
26	"The P's Game/Akiko on the Run"; Transliteration: "P no Yūgi/Akiko On Za Ran" (Japanese: Ｐの遊戯／亜樹子オン・ザ・ラン)	Puppeteer; Parent	Hidenori Ishida	Keiichi Hasegawa	March 14, 2010
Realizing Horinouchi is the Puppeteer Dopant, Akiko accuses him of forcing Riko to help him attack his critics before Isaka secretly uses his weather-based powers to bring Horinouchi to his clinic and offer Wakana for use in his plans. Meanwhile, Akiko locates Riko, who tells her to listen to her doll, but Akiko is unable to and throws it away. After Terui calls to tell her Horinouchi's daughter Rikako died a month prior, Akiko deduces "Riko" is her doll, which assumed Rikako's appearance. She eventually finds it and gets Riko's message. Meanwhile, Horinouchi and an enthralled Wakana attack the office until Terui severs his control. Horinouchi reveals he attacked everyone who criticized The Girl and the Dollhouse because he wrote it in Rikako's memory before taking control of Terui. However, Hidari and Philip use the new gadget to free him before defeating Horinouchi and destroying his Gaia Memory. Believing he has nothing left now, Akiko gives him her doll and Rikako's message of not crying anymore. Meanwhile, an incensed Wakana attacks Isaka for manipulating her while Saeko learns he removed safeguards that protected Wakana from her Gaia Memory.
27	"The D Was Watching/The Transparent Magical Lady"; Transliteration: "D ga Miteita/Tōmei Majikaru Redi" (Japanese: Ｄが見ていた／透明マジカルレディ)	Denden; Disappearance	Koichi Sakamoto	Riku Sanjo	March 21, 2010
Stage magician Frank Shirogane puts his granddaughter and assistant Lily through a disappearing act, but is left unnerved when he succeeds. Meanwhile, the detectives test another new gadget they received from Shroud when they are suddenly visited by an invisible Lily, who came to them for help because she received a modified Gaia Memory to achieve this without turning into a monster, but is unable to become visible again. Agreeing to help, the detectives locate the person who gave her the Invisible Memory, Isaka. Upon confronting him, Isaka reveals he killed Terui's family before overpowering the Riders. Terui tries to kill him, but Lily gets in his way to beg for Isaka's help. Seemingly agreeing, he escapes with her. Terui eventually re-confronts Isaka after he stabilizes the Invisible Memory, during which Isaka reveals he killed Terui's family while testing his powers and his intent to absorb other Gaia Memory powers, such as Lily's once the Invisible Memory kills her. Intervening in the fight, Hidari attempts a suicidal gambit.
28	"The D Was Watching/Twin Maximum Suicide"; Transliteration: "D ga Miteita/Kesshi no Tsuin Makishimamu" (Japanese: Ｄが見ていた／決死のツインマキシマム)	Denden; Disappearance	Koichi Sakamoto	Riku Sanjo	March 28, 2010
After nearly killing himself trying to defeat Isaka, Hidari begs Terui to save Lily and loses consciousness. Surviving the attack, Isaka is called away by Ryubee. To Philip's dismay, Terui instead focuses on avenging his family. Akiko eventually locates him before they find Lily, though Terui allows her to continue using the Invisible Memory for Frank's last performance before he retires. As Isaka earns Ryubee's respect despite what he did to Wakana and leaves to find Lily, Philip tells Terui he has a plan to save her. Following the show, Terui uses his Rider powers to temporarily stop Lily's heart, then restart it once the Invisible Memory has ejected itself from her body. Arriving to find Terui destroying it, an enraged Isaka fights him until Philip and a partially healed Hidari join the fray and help Terui drive him off. Isaka receives medical attention from Saeko while Lily thanks Terui for saving her.
29	"The Nightmarish H/The Melancholy of the Sleeping Princess"; Transliteration: "Akumu na H/Nemuri Hime no Yūutsu" (Japanese: 悪夢なＨ／眠り姫のユウウツ)	Himeka; Horror	Ryuta Tasaki	Keiichi Hasegawa	April 4, 2010
A sleep deprived college student named Himeka Yukimura arrives at the Narumi Detective Office, saying she and six of her classmates were attacked by a monster in their dreams. After Akiko realizes the culprit is a Dopant, Philip takes the case. Yukimura takes Hidari, whom she calls her "prince", and Akiko to Fuuto University, revealing she and the victims were part of a lucid dream sleep study led by Professor Akagi and his aid Hajime Fukushima. Finding Terui and Makura already there, the detectives and police discover the other victims have become comatose. Hoping to catch the Dopant, Terui and Hidari plan to use Akagi's brainwave devices, prompting Yukimura to call Terui her prince too. That night, Hidari fails to fall asleep while Terui falls victim to the Nightmare Dopant. The following night, Hidari and Philip use the brainwave device and their Rider powers to achieve dream telepathy and fight the monster, who reveals he wants to be Yukimura's "destined prince". Philip assumes it is Akagi, but learns Akagi also fell victim before his body is attacked by Isaka, who fends off the Fang Memory and knocks Philip unconscious while Hidari has to fight the Nightmare Dopant alone.
30	"The Nightmarish H/Who is the Prince?"; Transliteration: "Akumu na H/Ōjisama wa Dare da?" (Japanese: 悪夢なＨ／王子様は誰だ？)	Himeka; Horror	Ryuta Tasaki	Keiichi Hasegawa	April 11, 2010
As the Nightmare Dopant escapes, Hidari awakens to find Akiko holding Philip while Isaka moves to finish him. Suddenly, a living bird-like Gaia Memory digitizes Philip and flies off, causing Isaka to withdraw. Believing Fukushima is the Nightmare Dopant, Hidari leaves to confront him, but finds he has seemingly fallen victim to the monster. Due to her habit of sleep-talking, Akiko offers herself as bait. Meanwhile, Ryubee reveals to Isaka the bird-like Gaia Memory is the Xtreme Memory and realizes Shroud has gotten involved. Philip awakens inside the Xtreme Memory, where he is met by Shroud, who tells him he must abandon Hidari to save the world. In the dream world, Akiko successfully tricks the Nightmare Dopant into revealing his identity. Armed with Akiko's information, Hidari confronts Yukimura, accusing her of driving the Nightmare Dopant into attacking everyone because of her habit of calling every male who helps her her prince before exposing Fukushima, who reveals he fell in love with Yukimura before seeking revenge on her and everyone she called her prince and faked being a victim. As the Xtreme Memory returns Philip, he and Hidari defeat Fukushima. Afterward, Hidari asks Philip what happened, but Philip deflects the question.
31	"The B Carried on the Wind/The Beast Must Be Pursued"; Transliteration: "Kaze ga Yobu B/Yajū Oubeshi" (Japanese: 風が呼ぶＢ／野獣追うべし)	Beast; Bird	Satoshi Morota	Riku Sanjo	April 18, 2010
While Philip tries to discern Shroud's words, Terui requests his help in solving a decade old cold case involving a "Beastman" after a convict connected to it and one of Sokichi's old clients, Isamu Bito, is released from prison. Philip later learns Sokichi worked the case because there was no proof of Bito's involvement. Meanwhile, Hidari accompanies Bito as he approaches his old friends turned married couple, Maruo and Suzuko Arima, to ask them about the Beastman case, but Maruo derides him for associating with Sokichi, who took something of theirs, which Hidari claims to know of. Hidari and Bito are later attacked by Maruo as the Beast Dopant, who demands "the bear" from them. Philip and Terui arrive to help Hidari, but the detectives' Rider powers suddenly prove faulty while Maruo's regenerative capabilities help him survive. Despite this, Maruo escapes and joins forces with Isaka. That night, the Narumi detectives realize Sokichi owned a bear statue while Shroud contacts Philip, saying his power is evolving and he needs an ideal partner to use the Xtreme Memory. Akiko eventually locates the statue, but Isaka steals it while Hidari and Philip seemingly lose their powers.
32	"The B Carried on the Wind/Now, in the Radiance"; Transliteration: "Kaze ga Yobu B/Ima, Kagayaki no Naka de" (Japanese: 風が呼ぶＢ／今、輝きの中で)	Beast; Bird	Satoshi Morota	Riku Sanjo	April 25, 2010
Isaka tries to kill Hidari and Philip, but Terui rescues them, causing Philip to believe he is his ideal partner while Hidari starts to question his worthiness as Philip's partner. After recovering the statue, Hidari claims there is nothing special about it to the others. As Philip asks Terui to be his new partner, Hidari confronts the Arimas, revealing he found the Zone Memory in the statue, deduced Maruo is the Beastman, with Suzuko as his accomplice, Sokichi took and hid the Zone Memory upon discovering their identities, and Bito took the fall for the Arimas because he was in love with Suzuko. Exposed, she takes the Zone Memory and transforms into the Zone Dopant before using her teleportation powers to bring all of them to the nearby river. Philip arrives soon after to apologize, having found a message from Sokichi to Bito saying "Nobody's perfect", which made him realize Hidari is his true partner. Reaffirming their partnership, they utilize the Xtreme Memory to restore and enhance their Rider powers, allowing them to defeat the Arimas. Meanwhile, Ryubee and Wakana bear witness to the true Gaia Memory as it reacts to the transformation.
33	"Y's Tragedy/The Woman Looking For Yesterday"; Transliteration: "Y no Higeki/Kinō o Sagasu Onna" (Japanese: Ｙの悲劇／きのうを探す女)	Yesterday; Yukie	Hidenori Ishida	Kazuki Nakashima	May 2, 2010
A woman named Yuko Fuwa comes to the Narumi Detective Office to ask for help in looking for her lost cat Kinou, which Hidari agrees to. While looking for the cat, Hidari encounters and pursues a Dopant, who leads him to Fuuto Hall and places an hourglass symbol on him before escaping. Later that night, Yuko successfully finds Kinou and thanks Hidari for his help. Meanwhile, Terui investigates a strange series of attacks wherein the victims were all marked with an hourglass symbol. The next day, Hidari suddenly reenacts the previous day's events, leading to him attacking Saeko. After Terui rescues her, Philip uses the Xtreme Memory to free Hidari. An arriving Yuko reveals she is the Yesterday Dopant, her real name is Yukie Sudo, younger sister of Kirihiko, and she came to Fuuto to seek revenge on Saeko for killing him and become a member of the Museum.
34	"Y's Tragedy/Brother and Sister"; Transliteration: "Y no Higeki/Ani Imōto" (Japanese: Ｙの悲劇／あにいもうと)	Yesterday; Yukie	Hidenori Ishida	Kazuki Nakashima	May 9, 2010
In light of Yukie's desire to avenge Kirihiko, Hidari reluctantly lets her go. Despite the others reminding him that she used him, he feels there is still good in her while Yukie meets Saeko to ask for a place in the Museum. The next day, Hidari meets with Yukie to talk her out of her plans by revealing what happened to Kirihiko from his perspective. However, she spreads several hourglasses throughout the city, forcing him to break off to destroy them before chaos ensues. Yukie meets with Saeko once more, having applied an hourglass to her. However, Saeko predicted Yukie's plot and uses her Dopant powers to transfer the brand to Yukie. Upon learning of what happened, Hidari and Philip try to save Yukie. Upon destroying the Yesterday Memory however, she develops amnesia.
35	"Beyond the R/The Rain Called Monster Approaches"; Transliteration: "R no Kanata ni/Yagate Kaibutsu toiu Na no Ame" (Japanese: Ｒの彼方に／やがて怪物という名の雨)	Ryu; Rain	Ryuta Tasaki	Keiichi Hasegawa	May 16, 2010
While visiting the Fuuto Bird Sanctuary, Terui encounters a woman resembling his younger sister Haruko, Nagi Shimamoto, mistreating a little girl. He attempts to confront her, but she flees. Amidst his search for her, he instead finds Hidari and Akiko, who are also after Shimamoto because they were hired by children who remember her for her kindness. Terui eventually finds Shimamoto, who reveals Isaka murdered her father and experimented on her. As Terui promises to protect her, Isaka arrives with an atypical Gaia Memory. Terui, Hidari, and Philip fight him until Isaka sees Shimamoto is not ready yet and escapes. Believing Terui did not keep his promise, Shimamoto storms off. Afterward, Philip deduces Isaka modified the Quetzalcoatlus Memory and discovered Shimamoto's fear of him enhances her connection to it. As Isaka and Saeko share their intentions to steal the Terror Memory and kill Ryubee respectively, Terui finds Shimamoto, reveals his history to her, and reaffirms his promise to her. Suddenly, Isaka returns and turns a macaw into the Quetzalcoatlus Dopant to intimidate and abduct her. Hidari and Philip give chase and defeat the Dopant, but Isaka kidnaps Shimamoto. Concurrently, Terui demands Shroud make him stronger.
36	"Beyond the R/Surpass Them All"; Transliteration: "R no Kanata ni/Subete o Furikire" (Japanese: Ｒの彼方に／全てを振り切れ)	Ryu; Rain	Ryuta Tasaki	Keiichi Hasegawa	May 23, 2010
After repelling Isaka and rescuing Shimamoto, Hidari and Philip bring her to the Narumi Detective Office to inspect her condition, determining Terui's emotional support is hindering Isaka's experiment. Meanwhile, Shroud eventually accepts Terui's demands and trains him in using the Trial Memory, the powers of which are affected by a strict time limit. Concurrently, Isaka confronts Ryubee, but Saeko takes Isaka away, after which he confesses his feelings for her. She later approaches Wakana, who refuses to join her. Saeko attacks her, but is thwarted by the Smilodon Dopant. Upon learning Isaka has captured Shimamoto to lure him into a trap, Shroud claims Terui passed her tests and allows him to leave to face Isaka. Successfully using the Trial Memory, Terui destroys the Quetzalcoatlus and Weather Memories and defeats Isaka. As he dies from the abuses of his Gaia Memory experiments, Isaka warns Terui that Shroud will kill them all. Afterward, Terui oversees a reformed Shimamoto guiding children at the Fuuto Bird Sanctuary.
37	"Visitor X/The Bridge of Promises"; Transliteration: "Raihōsha X/Yakusoku no Hashi" (Japanese: 来訪者Ｘ／約束の橋)	Foundation X Xtreme	Satoshi Morota	Keiichi Hasegawa	May 30, 2010
After a strange man asks Hidari for help in finding his family, Hidari learns from Watcherman that he is a presumed dead neuroscientist named Satoshi Yamashiro. Hidari confronts him, forcing Yamashiro to reveal he was forced by the Sonozaki family to help the Museum before he mounted an escape attempt to see his family, but is being hunted by a Museum assassin, the Hopper Dopant. Philip attempts to use the Gaia Library to research Ryubee, but is unable to while Terui reveals Ryubee's name has come up across multiple cases. As Shroud tasks Terui with destroying the Museum, Ryubee offers Wakana the chance to lead the Museum into the final stages of his plans and welcomes a visitor from his syndicate's sponsor, Foundation X. The next day, Wakana asks Philip for advice, to which he says they should be themselves. Elsewhere, a fugitive Saeko attempts to kill Wakana, but the Smilodon Dopant defeats her, takes her Taboo Memory, and leaves her for dead. Believing this to be true, a horrified Wakana attempts to leave Fuuto while Hidari, Philip, and Terui fight the Hopper Dopant, who reveals Yamashiro erased Philip's memories of his family.
38	"Visitor X/In the Name of the Museum"; Transliteration: "Raihōsha X/Myūjiamu no Na no Moto ni" (Japanese: 来訪者Ｘ／ミュージアムの名のもとに)	Foundation X Xtreme	Satoshi Morota	Keiichi Hasegawa	June 6, 2010
After fending off the Hopper Dopant, Terui takes Yamashiro into police custody to glean more information on the Museum. As Ryubee assures Foundation X representative, Jun Kazu, that his organization funding the Museum will work out, Akiko tries to cheer up Philip, who receives a call from Wakana saying that she wants to leave Fuuto with him. Conflicted, Philip asks Hidari to help him meet her. Meanwhile, the Hopper Dopant attacks the FPD to kill Yamashiro. Terui holds her off, allowing Yamashiro to escape to see his family. He eventually succeeds, but is mortally wounded by the Hopper Dopant. Terui defeats her and destroys her Gaia Memory before she is killed by the Smilodon Dopant. Upon learning Yamashiro was hospitalized, Hidari and Philip leave to check on him while Ryubee forces Wakana to assume her place in the Museum. Before he dies, Yamashiro apologizes to Philip and reveals his real name is Raito Sonozaki. Resolving to help his sister, Philip meets with Wakana, who tries to kill him. Hidari arrives to help him fight back. Elsewhere, Saeko awakens in a hotel, having been saved by Kazu, who offers to help her.
39	"The Likelihood of the G/Bad Cinema Paradise"; Transliteration: "G no Kanōsei/Baddo Shinema Paradaisu" (Japanese: Ｇの可能性／バッドシネマパラダイス)	Gene; Genre	Takayuki Shibasaki	Riku Sanjo	June 20, 2010
As Akiko resumes working to cheer up Philip, an actress named Ai Nijimura comes to the Narumi office for help investigating a movie theater where people are being forced to watch a strange film featuring her likeness. Upon arrival, Hidari and Akiko encounter the film's director, Toru Kawai, who communicates through a notepad. Upon discovering he is the Gene Dopant, having used his molecular alteration powers to assume Nijimura's appearance, Hidari and Philip defeat him, but Akiko offers to help Kawai make a better film to secretly help him and Philip open up. Elsewhere, Saeko learns of Wakana's new role from Kazu, along with his feelings for her, and retrieves the Nasca Memory to turn herself into the R Nasca Dopant. Concurrently, Ryubee gives Wakana the Gaia Progressor, a device that will evolve her Dopant form, and tasks her with finding Kawai to activate it. The Sonozaki sisters each attack the film production and fight the attending Riders. In the chaos, Akiko tries to save the film camera, but Kawai stops her, refusing to accept her changes and demanding the Gene Memory back.
40	"The Likelihood of the G/You Are Unforgivable"; Transliteration: "G no Kanōsei/Anata ga Yurusenai" (Japanese: Ｇの可能性／あなたが許せない)	Gene; Genre	Takayuki Shibasaki	Riku Sanjo	June 27, 2010
With their fight ending in a stalemate, Philip attempts to reason with Saeko, but she refuses to listen and flees. As Terui repels Wakana, Akiko fails to save the camera, but leads everyone in resuming production nonetheless. Meanwhile, Saeko declines Kazu's help and feelings to use her newfound powers to attack Wakana, who vows to become stronger. She later manages to steal the Gene Memory, kidnap Kawai, and force him to use his powers to fuse the Gaia Progressor with her body. As Akiko rescues Kawai and convinces him to speak his mind without his notepad, he alerts the Riders, who witness Wakana evolve into Claydoll Xtreme before she overpowers them and Saeko, then disappears. All throughout, Ryubee reveals to Kazu she has become an avatar for Earth's power and he allowed the Riders to live to provide data for the Gaia Progressor. Saeko vows to surpass Wakana while Kawai willingly allows Hidari and Philip to destroy the Gene Memory and works with Ai to complete his film his way. Philip meets with Wakana in the Gaia Library, promising to save her and get his family back.
41	"The J Labyrinth/The Psychotic Villainess"; Transliteration: "J no Meikyū/Ryōkiteki na Akujo" (Japanese: Ｊの迷宮／猟奇的な悪女)	Jewel; Jinno	Hidenori Ishida	Keiichi Hasegawa	July 4, 2010
Jinno calls for Hidari's help after a mysterious woman with a large diamond ring framed him as a jewel thief. Hidari accepts, believing the woman might be related to a separate case involving seven female models who were turned into diamonds. With Akiko and "Santa's" help, he discovers the models went to the Blue Topaz nightclub. They try to investigate, but are barred from entering until male model Makoto Uesugi vouches for them. Soon after, Akiko encounters the mystery woman, who turns into the Jewel Dopant. Hidari and Philip fight the monster, but are outmatched by her invulnerability. After she escapes, Uesugi returns, claiming his best friend Rui Jojima became the Jewel Dopant due to a love triangle between them and their friend Satoru Takeda, who disappeared a month prior. Later, Philip attempts to discern the Dopant's weakness, but Wakana uses her newfound powers to impede his progress. Meanwhile, Kazu informs Saeko she can defeat Wakana if she acquires the Jewel Memory. Terui and Saeko separately confront Jojima, but she escapes them both. When Hidari and Akiko find her, they realize her ring is Takeda before Jojima forces Hidari to fight her.
42	"The J Labyrinth/The Diamond Is Hurt"; Transliteration: "J no Meikyū/Daiyamondo wa Kizutsuite" (Japanese: Ｊの迷宮／ダイヤモンドは傷ついて)	Jewel; Jinno	Hidenori Ishida	Keiichi Hasegawa	July 11, 2010
As Hidari and an arriving Terui and Saeko force Jojima to retreat, Philip tries to reason with Wakana, but is forced to fight her. Uesugi approaches Hidari, claiming Jojima asked him to meet with her and asks Hidari to accompany him. Hidari saves Uesugi from a trap, but soon comes to realize he is the real Jewel Dopant. Philip confirms his accusation, revealing Uesugi forced Jojima to use the Jewel Memory to save Satoru. Uesugi tries to throw Satoru into the sea, but Terui saves him while Philip and Hidari, having determined his weak spot, defeat Uesugi and destroy the Jewel Memory, restoring his victims in the process. As he is arrested, Jojima reveals she got Jinno involved because she could use his gullibility to expose Uesugi. Once his name is cleared, Jinno vows to control his gullibility.
43	"The O Chain/The Aged Detective"; Transliteration: "O no Rensa/Rōjin Tantei" (Japanese: Ｏの連鎖／老人探偵)	Old; Obscured	Koichi Sakamoto	Keiichi Hasegawa	July 18, 2010
A woman named Yoshie Goto seeks out Terui, Hidari, Philip, and Akiko's help after her daughter Miyu was mysteriously aged into an old woman. Heading to Miyu's school, Terui and Akiko learn from the principal that Miyu was recently chosen to be the lead in the school play before meeting her friend Kumi Sekine and her mother Mitsuko. Meanwhile, Hidari meets with Watcherman, who reveals a fortune teller named Takashi Soma is offering to age people that his customers hate. Upon finding him, Terui and Hidari try to arrest Soma, but he turns into the Old Dopant and turns Akiko into an old woman. The Riders overwhelm Soma until he assumes his combat form to age Hidari and cover his escape. Terui tries to pursue him, but is met by Shroud, who claims he and Philip must join forces and use the power of hatred to defeat Soma. As Akiko takes Yoshie to find Mitsuko, who they learn hired Soma to help Kumi take Miyu's place in the play, Philip finds Wakana in the Gaia Library trying to research Shroud. Terui later meets with Saeko, who reveals Shroud seeks revenge on Ryubee and gave Isaka the Weather Memory.
44	"The O Chain/Shroud's Confession"; Transliteration: "O no Rensa/Shuraudo no Kokuhaku" (Japanese: Ｏの連鎖／シュラウドの告白)	Old; Obscured	Koichi Sakamoto	Keiichi Hasegawa	July 25, 2010
In flashbacks, Ryubee and his wife Fumine were happily married until their son Raito became the Child of Fate. She tried to take him away, but Ryubee disfigured her, forcing her to flee alone. In the present, Terui confronts Shroud, who reveals he is immune to Ryubee's powers and she gave Soma the Old Memory. After admitting her role in his family's deaths, Terui attacks her, but she uses supernatural powers to fend him off and make him angrier until they are ambushed by Wakana, who reveals further that Shroud is Fumine. Meanwhile, Miyu arrives at the Narumi Detective Office with an aged Kumi, causing Akiko to realize Yoshie also hired Soma. She later finds the mothers arguing with each other until an arriving Terui calls them out for focusing on themselves and making their children suffer. He approaches Shroud once more to forgive her, understanding that she is trying to help Philip. After she reveals her history to him, Terui sets out to prove her wrong by working with Hidari and Philip to defeat Soma and restore his victims. Afterward, Shroud says she hoped Isaka would defeat Ryubee, but did not anticipate his actions, before disappearing, to Philip's dismay.
45	"Who the K Needs/The Devil's Tail"; Transliteration: "K ga Motometa Mono/Akuma no Shippo" (Japanese: Ｋが求めたもの／悪魔のしっぽ)	Kyoko; King	Satoshi Morota	Riku Sanjo	August 1, 2010
Twelve years prior, Raito fell into the true Gaia Memory and became the Child of Fate. In the present, Philip discovers Wakana gave him full access to the Gaia Library and a book about himself, which reveals his history. Meanwhile, Hidari is accosted by Kyoko Todoroki, a Fuuto Museum curator who seeks an artifact called the "Evil Tail" for Ryubee. Over Akiko's concerns, Hidari accepts. The detectives eventually locate the artifact, but are attacked by the Smilodon Dopant. Hidari and Philip fight back, but Ryubee intervenes. Philip forces Hidari to retreat for Akiko and Todoroki's safety. While regrouping, Hidari tries to learn the Evil Tail's connection to Ryubee's plans, but Todoroki stops him, refusing to believe Ryubee is a criminal and steals the artifact. Despite being pursued by the detectives, Todoroki reaches Ryubee, who sends the Smilodon Dopant to kill her. Hidari confronts Ryubee, but he uses his powers to frighten him. Philip helps restore Hidari's faculties so they can defeat the Smilodon Dopant. Ryubee soon arrives, revealing Philip's role in enacting the "Gaia Impact" to ensure humanity's future. Terui arrives to aid the detectives, but Ryubee summons the Terror Dragon to fight him.
46	"Who the K Needs/The Last Supper"; Transliteration: "K ga Motometa Mono/Saigo no Bansan" (Japanese: Ｋがもとめたもの／最後の晩餐)	Kyoko; King	Satoshi Morota	Riku Sanjo	August 8, 2010
Philip reveals his history to Hidari as Ryubee demands he return to him. Philip refuses, but Hidari's fear prevent them from fighting back. Ryubee transports himself and Philip back to the Sonozaki manor and invites Saeko and Shroud to join them and Wakana for a celebratory dinner while Akiko attends to Terui and Hidari. Amidst the dinner, Saeko fights Wakana, who defeats her and destroys the Nasca Memory while Shroud leaves, telling Philip Hidari is his only family now. Unable to fight back, Philip calls Akiko to give Hidari his final goodbyes before Ryubee sacrifices him to the true Gaia Memory so Wakana can absorb him. Meanwhile, Todoroki steals back the Evil Tail and gives it to Hidari, who discovers the artifact is Ryubee's archaeology brush, which is inscribed with the Sonozaki family's names and served as his inspiration. Remembering Philip's words, Hidari joins Terui in breaching the Sonozaki manor to save him. As Terui destroys the Terror Dragon, Hidari uses the Xtreme Memory to restore Philip so they can defeat Ryubee, setting the manor ablaze. Going insane, Ryubee enters the estate and dies in the flames while Kazu secretly rescues Wakana and takes her to Foundation X.
47	"The Abandoned U/A Request From Philip"; Transliteration: "Nokosareta U/Firippu kara no Irai" (Japanese: 残されたＵ／フィリップからの依頼)	Utopia; Union	Hidenori Ishida	Riku Sanjo	August 15, 2010
Having formed a bond with her, Philip discovers Wakana's fate and asks Hidari to help him save her. Believing Saeko has her, Hidari and Terui locate her, but she is surprised to learn Wakana is alive. Meanwhile, Foundation X places Kazu in charge of Gaia Memory production while he secretly works on enacting his own Gaia Impact using Wakana, who was fused with her Claydoll Memory, and arranges for Saeko to take over the Museum's remnants. He approaches her and the Riders, revealing his plans to them before transforming into the Utopia Dopant and using his godlike powers to overwhelm them and take Saeko. Philip stops Hidari from intervening because Ryubee's Gaia Impact destabilized his body and he will disappear if they use their Rider powers. Hidari storms off to find Shroud, who reveals she hired Sokichi to save Philip. Upon his return, Philip gives him a farewell gift. Concurrently, Kazu returns Saeko's Taboo Memory and reveals further he intends to use Wakana to kill all humans who are incomptitable with Gaia Memories. With Saeko's indirect help, the Riders eventually locate Wakana, but Kazu overpowers them and threatens to kill Hidari upon discovering Philip's emotions are tied to Wakana's power.
48	"The Abandoned U/Eternal Partners"; Transliteration: "Nokosareta U/Eien no Aibō" (Japanese: 残されたＵ／永遠の相棒)	Utopia; Union	Hidenori Ishida	Riku Sanjo	August 22, 2010
Before Kazu can kill Hidari, Saeko intervenes and defeats Kazu, only to learn he is a Necro-Over before he kidnaps her and Wakana. With Terui hospitalized, Hidari, Philip, and Akiko attempt to regroup. Hidari and Philip argue, with Philip getting Hidari to promise him to continue protecting Fuuto while Hidari still refuses to let Philip go. The trio soon learn that Kazu is attacking their friends. As Philip breaks down in tears, a guilt-ridden Hidari leaves while Wakana awakens and learns of Kazu's plans for her from Saeko. When Kazu approaches them, Saeko reveals she no longer has to prove herself to anyone and tries to save Wakana. He subsequently kills Saeko and forces Wakana to enact his Gaia Impact until Hidari arrives to rescue Wakana. They reunite with Philip, but Kazu catches up to them. Resolute in stopping him, Hidari and Philip use the Xtreme Memory and Philip's emotions to overwhelm and kill Kazu and destroy the Utopia Memory. As Foundation X abandons Fuuto, the detectives share their goodbyes before Philip and the Xtreme Memory disappear. After taking Wakana to the hospital, Hidari opens Philip's gift, finding a new way to use his Rider powers and a farewell note.
49	"Goodbye to the E/A Bouquet of Justice to This City"; Transliteration: "E ni Sayonara/Kono Machi ni Seigi no Hanataba o" (Japanese: Ｅにさよなら／この街に正義の花束を)	Energy; Ending	Hidenori Ishida	Riku Sanjo	August 29, 2010
In flashbacks, Wakana meets with a terminally ill Shroud, who reveals what happened to Philip and how she can enact a Gaia Impact on a smaller scale before dying. She subsequently sacrifices herself to use her powers to revive him. He later meets with his family in the Gaia Library to share their goodbyes, with the Sonozakis entrusting Fuuto and the Earth's wellbeing to him. Philip spends the next year reconstituting himself in the Xtreme Memory and watching over Hidari. In the present, Hidari and a boy named Akira Aoyama work to find the latter's missing sister, Yui. With the Fuuto Irregulars' help, the pair find she is being held captive by a gang called EXE, who seek to continue the Museum's work with Gaia Memories and become Dopants. Joined by Terui and Akiko, Hidari transforms into Kamen Rider Joker to defeat the EXE members while Akira rescues Yui. The gang's leader, the Energy Dopant, tries to kill Hidari, but Philip uses the Xtreme Memory to save him. After revealing how he came back, he joins Hidari in becoming Kamen Rider W to defeat the Energy Dopant.
