= Hikaru Yamamoto =

Japanese actress

- Born: February 28, 1991 (age 35); Osaka Prefecture, Japan
- Occupation: Actress
- Years active: 2007–present
- Agent: Twin Planet
- Height: 160 cm (5 ft 3 in)
- Spouse: Unknown (m. 2024)
- Children: 1

Hikaru Yamamoto (山本 ひかる, Yamamoto Hikaru; born February 28, 1991) is a Japanese actress from Osaka Prefecture. After winning the Amuse Ohimesama Audition, she was signed onto the Amuse, Inc. talent agency. She starred as the female lead in Kamen Rider W in 2009-2010.

== Personal life ==
On January 25, 2024, she announced her marriage through her agency. On May 1, 2026, Yamamoto gave birth to a baby girl.

== Filmography ==
=== Television ===
Year	Title	Role	Other notes	Ref.
2007	Watashitachi no Kyokasho	Chiharu Nobe		
2009	Kamen Rider W	Akiko Narumi		
2011	Muscle Girl	Tsukasa Sudo		
2013–present	The Woman of S.R.I.	Ami Wakuta	Season 13–	
2019	Kishiryu Sentai Ryusoulger	Yui	Episode 29	

=== Anime ===
Year	Title	Role	Other notes	Ref.
2006	Artificial insect KABUTO BORG Victory by Victory	Sayaka		

=== Film ===
Year	Title	Role	Other notes	Ref.
2008	Utatama	Sakurako Yamada		
2009	My Rainy Days	Tomoko		
2009	Elite Yankee Saburo	Haruna		
2009	Kamen Rider × Kamen Rider W & Decade: Movie War 2010	Akiko Narumi		
2010	Kamen Rider W Forever: A to Z/The Gaia Memories of Fate	Akiko Narumi		
2010	Kamen Rider × Kamen Rider OOO & W Featuring Skull: Movie War Core	Akiko Narumi		
2011	Kamen Rider W Returns	Akiko Narumi		
2013	Kamen Rider × Kamen Rider Gaim & Wizard: The Fateful Sengoku Movie Battle	Cha-cha	Cameo	
2021	The Woman of S.R.I. the Movie	Ami Wakuta		
