= Minehiro Kinomoto =

Japanese actor (born 1989)

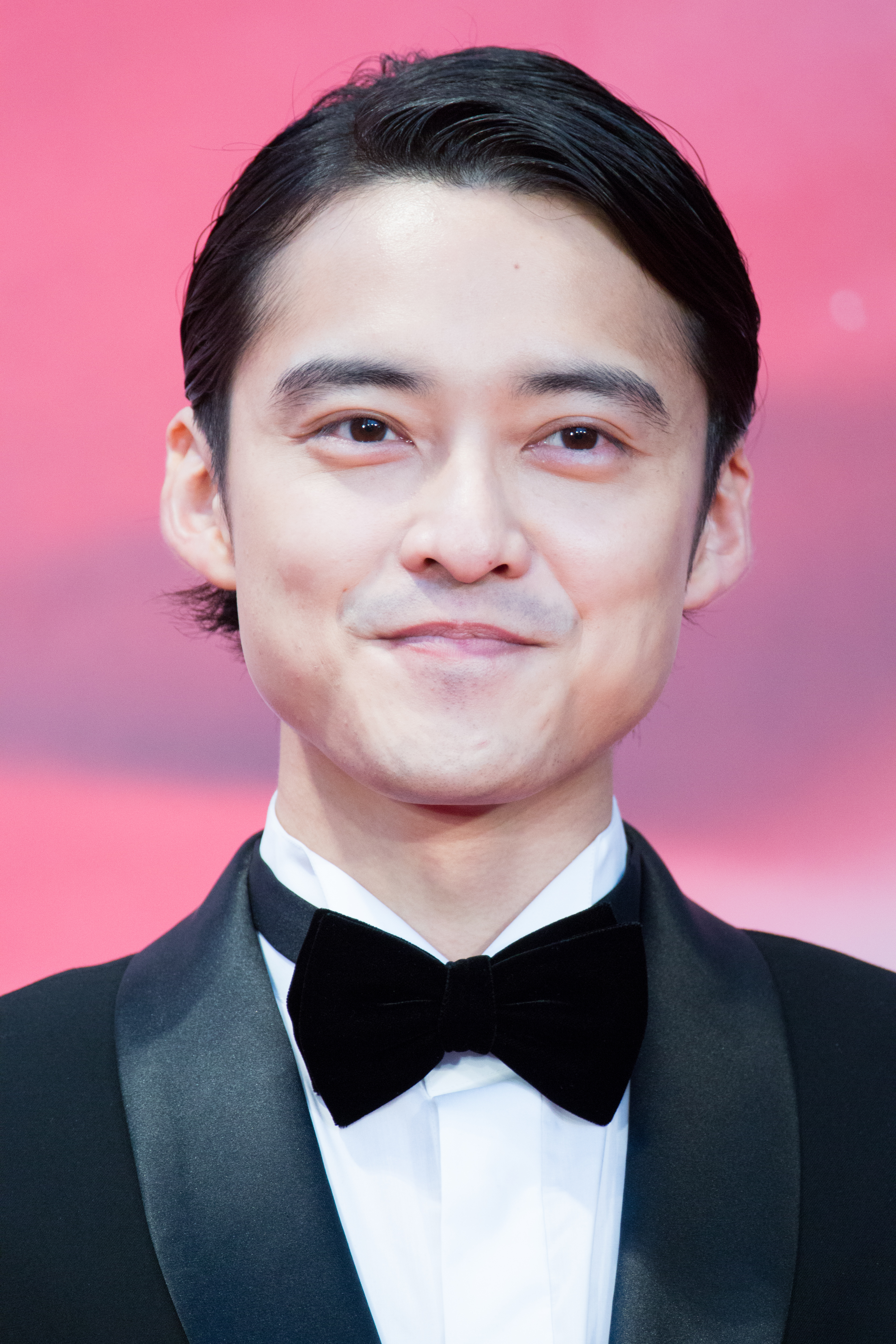
- Kinomoto at Opening Ceremony of the Tokyo International Film Festival, 2017.
- Born: November 22, 1989 (age 36); Shiga Prefecture, Japan
- Occupation: Actor
- Years active: 2007–present
- Spouse: Unknown (m. 2023)
- Children: 1
- Website: https://www.village-entertainment.jp/artists/kinomoto.html

Minehiro Kinomoto (木ノ本 嶺浩, Kinomoto Minehiro; born November 22, 1989) is a Japanese stage and television actor from Shiga Prefecture. Minehiro portrayed Ryu Terui, the Superintendent of the police force and the secondary hero of the television series Kamen Rider W.

== Personal life ==
On November 10, 2023, he announced his marriage to a "general" woman. On January 15, 2025, he announced that the couple welcomed their first child at the end of last year.

== Filmography ==
=== Movies ===
Year	Title	Role	Other notes	Ref.
2009	Kamen Rider × Kamen Rider W & Decade: Movie War 2010	Ryu Terui	Cameo (credited as the Mysterious Man)	
2010	Kamen Rider W Forever: A to Z/The Gaia Memories of Fate	Ryu Terui/Kamen Rider Accel		
2010	Kamen Rider × Kamen Rider OOO & W Featuring Skull: Movie War Core	Ryu Terui/Kamen Rider Accel		
2011	Kamen Rider W Returns	Ryu Terui/Kamen Rider Accel	Accel portion	
2013	Kamen Rider × Kamen Rider Gaim & Wizard: The Fateful Sengoku Movie Battle	Hideyoshi	Cameo	
2016	Kamen Rider Drive Saga: Chaser	Ryu Terui/Kamen Rider Accel		
2018	3ft Ball and Souls			
2020	Kamen Rider Zi-O Next Time: Geiz, Majesty	Ryu Terui/Kamen Rider Accel		
2023	Wheels and Axle			
2024	This Man		Lead role	
2024	Bibalam			
2025	Time Machine Girl	Yasuto Ide		

=== TV ===
- Poor Man Bombīmen – Tetsu Igarashi
- Homeroom on the Beachside – Akihiro Wada
- Handsome ★ Suits: The TV – Himself
- Sazae-san 40th Anniversary Special Drama – Driving school students
- Kamen Rider W – Ryu Terui
- Saturday Premium: I'll Teach You How to Find a Dream! – Himself
