= Sophia (Japanese band) =

Japanese rock band

- Origin: Japan
- Genres: Pop rock; alternative rock; power pop; lo-fi; art rock
- Years active: 1994–2013, 2022–present
- Labels: Toy's Factory; Toshiba EMI; Universal Music Japan; Avex Trax
- Members: Mitsuru Matsuoka; Kazutaka Toyota; Yoshio Kuroyanagi; Yoshitomo Akamatsu; Keiichi Miyako
- Website: sophia-eternal.jp

Sophia (stylized as SOPHIA) is a Japanese rock band formed in 1994 by vocalist Mitsuru Matsuoka, guitarist Kazutaka Toyota, bassist Yoshio Kuroyanagi, drummer Yoshitomo Akamatsu and keyboardist Keiichi Miyako. Currently signed to Avex Trax since 2011, they made their major debut in 1995 on Toy's Factory. They changed over to Toshiba EMI in 2004, and Universal Music Japan in 2009.

Their album Alive was named one of the top albums from 1989 to 1998 in a 2004 issue of the music magazine Band Yarouze. Their single "Boku wa Koko ni Iru" was used as the 2nd ending theme for the anime Kaleido Star. Keyboardist Miyako announced on March 21, 2010, that he was diagnosed with lymphoma, and on April 10 the band went on a hiatus. Sophia, as a quartet, was a guest of honor at Anime Expo in Los Angeles from July 1–4, 2010, having their first concert in the US on the 3rd. The group ended the hiatus on August 13, 2011, after a live show at the Nippon Budokan, but eventually ended up disbanding for good on August 12, 2013, following one more live show at the Nippon Budokan. On March 27, 2022, Sophia announced their reformation, and played their comeback live on October 11 of that year at the Nippon Budokan.

Sophia is often considered a visual kei band, despite the fact that for nearly their entire career their appearance was tame compared to most others in the movement. On October 23, 2011, the band performed at V-Rock Festival 2011. Their song "Machi" was covered by Doremidan on the compilation Crush! (90's V-Rock Best Hit Cover Songs), which was released on January 26, 2011, and features current visual kei bands covering songs from bands that were important to the '90s visual kei movement. "Gokigen Tori (Crawler Is Crazy)" was covered by Annie's Black on its sequel, Crush! 2 (90's V-Rock Best Hit Cover Songs), that was released on November 23, 2011. "Eternal Flame" was covered by Makoto for Crash! 3 (90's V-Rock Best Hit Cover Love Songs), which was released on June 27, 2012, and featured then-current visual kei bands covering love songs by visual kei bands of the '90s.

== Members ==
- Mitsuru Matsuoka (松岡 充, Matsuoka Mitsuru) – vocals
- Kazutaka Toyota (豊田 和貴, Toyota Kazutaka) – guitar
- Yoshio Kuroyanagi (黒柳 能生, Kuroyanagi Yoshio) – bass guitar
- Yoshitomo Akamatsu (赤松 芳朋, Akamatsu Yoshitomo) – drums
- Keiichi Miyako (都 啓一, Miyako Keiichi) – keyboards

== Discography ==
=== Albums ===
==== Studio albums ====
- (1997.04.23) Little Circus
- (1998.05.20) Alive
- (1999.04.14) Material (マテリアル)
- (2001.03.07) Shinkaron (進化論 / Theory of Evolution)
- (2003.09.25) Yume (夢 / Dream)
- (2004.09.15) Everblue
- (2006.03.23) We
- (2007.10.10) 2007
- (2009.06.24) Band Age
- (2013.03.06) Mirai Otona Sengen (未来大人宣言)

==== Live ====
- (2000.01.01) 1999

==== Compilations ====
- (2001.12.19) The Short Hand: Singles Collection (singles)
- (2001.12.19) The Long Hand: Members' Selection (album tracks + B-sides)
- (2005.11.02) 10th Anniversary Best (fan-selected singles collection)
- (2010.01.20) 15 (15th anniversary song remake album)
- (2011.01.19) All Singles (A) (Complete singles)
- (2011.01.19) All B-Side (B) (complete B-sides)
- (2011.01.19) All: 1995–2010 (complete singles and B-side tracks)

=== EPs ===
- (1995.03.21) Sophia (independent demo)
- (1995.10.02) Boys
- (1995.11.01) Girls
- (1996.07.01) Kiss the Future

=== Singles ===
- (1996.04.22) "Himawari" (ヒマワリ / "Sunflower")
- (1996.05.21) "Early Summer Rain"
- (1996.11.11) "Believe"
- (1997.02.19) "Little Cloud"
- (1997.07.09) "Machi" (街 / Town)
- (1997.11.27) "Kimi to Yurete Itai" (君と揺れていたい / "I Want to be Swaying with You")
- (1998.04.22) "Gokigen Tori (Crawler Is Crazy)" (ゴキゲン鳥 ～crawler is crazy～ / "High-spirited Bird")
- (1998.11.26) "Kuroi Boots (Oh My Friend)" (黒いブーツ～oh my friend～ / "Black Boots")
- (1999.03.25) "Beautiful" (ビューティフル)
- (1999.08.04) "Place"
- (1999.12.15) "Oar"
- (2000.02.02) "Missile" (ミサイル)
- (2000.10.18) "Walk"
- (2001.01.17) "Shinkaron (Good Morning! – Hello! 21st-Century)" (進化論 ～GOOD MORNING!-HELLO! 21st-CENTURY～ / "Theory of Evolution")
- (2001.06.13) "Kuru Kuru"
- (2001.09.05) "Strawberry & Lion"
- (2001.11.21) "Thank You"
- (2002.02.27) "Hard Worker"
- (2002.06.19) "Rock Star"
- (2002.10.09) "Mada Minu Keshiki" (未だ見ぬ景色 / "As Yet Unseen Landscape")
- (2003.01.01) "Wake Naki New Days" (理由なきNewDays / "No Reason New Days"; +separate limited-edition version)
- (2003.07.30) "Boku wa Koko ni Iru" (僕はここにいる / "I'm Here")
- (2004.05.12) "Tabi no Tochū" (旅の途中 / "On a Trip"; limited)
- (2004.05.19) "Please, Please" (limited)
- (2004.05.26) "Hana wa Karete Mata Saku" (花は枯れて また咲く / "A Flower Withers Then Later Blooms"; limited)
- (2004.08.04) "Aoi Kisetsu" (青い季節 / "Blue Season")
- (2005.04.27) "Answer (Ichiban Tadashii Kotae)" (ANSWER ～イチバンタダシイコタエ～ / "Answer (Most Correct Answer)")
- (2005.07.06) "One Summer Day"
- (2006.02.22) "Endroll" (エンドロール) / "Brother & Sister" (+separate limited-edition version)
- (2006.10.18) "Stain"
- (2007.03.21) "Kimi to Tsuki no Hikari" (君と月の光 / "You and the Moonlight"; +separate limited-edition version)
- (2007.07.18) "Hoshi" (星 / "Star")
- (2007.09.12) "Aozora no Kakera" (青空の破片 / "Piece of Blue Sky")
- (2009.05.06) "Baby Smile"
- (2011.07.27) "Cod-E: E no Angō" (cod-E ~Eの暗号~ / "Cod-E: The Code of E")
- (2012.01.11) "Rainbow Rain/Sayonara Itoshi no Peter Pan Syndrome" (rainbow rain／サヨナラ 愛しのピーターパンシンドローム)
