= List of returning characters in Kamen Rider Zi-O =

As a special anniversary series, Kamen Rider Zi-O features cameos from actors reprising their roles from past Kamen Rider series. While most appear in one or two episodes and movies, the protagonists of Kamen Rider Decade become recurring characters as they are directly involved in Kamen Rider Zi-O's storyline.

== Kamen Rider Build ==
=== Sento Kiryu ===
Sento Kiryu (桐生 戦兎, Kiryū Sento), born Takumi Katsuragi (葛城 巧, Katsuragi Takumi), is a scientist and the titular Rider of Kamen Rider Build (仮面ライダービルド, Kamen Raidā Birudo). Originally from an alternate reality where the alien Evolto divided Japan into three regions, Sento caused his reality to be absorbed into the "prime" Kamen Rider universe after using the Pandora Box to erase Evolto's existence from Earth's history.

Due to the Another Rider Another Build's creation, Sento lost his memories as Kamen Rider Build until Sougo Tokiwa came to seek his help, causing the Build Ride Watch to appear in Sento's pocket and restore his memories. Sento gave it to Sougo before the latter and his ally Geiz travel back to the former's world in 2017 to defeat Another Build's past iteration, establishing a bootstrap paradox in the process.

- Year 2017: Sento encounters a time-displaced Sougo while he and his ally Ryuga were still in their reality, deducing the boy came from the future. They would encounter Sougo again, this time with Geiz, as the four of them fought Another Build together. During the fight, Sento gradually loses his powers and memories as a Kamen Rider, to the point where he started referring to himself as Takumi. To prevent Sento's past from being permanently altered, Sougo gives him and Ryuga blank Ride Watches so they can connect with him in the future.

During the events of Kamen Rider Heisei Generations Forever, Sento and Ryuga help Shingo Hisanaga escape from Another W and encounter the Super Time Jacker, Tid before joining forces with Sougo and the other Heisei Kamen Riders to defeat him.

Atsuhiro Inukai (犬飼 貴丈, Inukai Atsuhiro) reprises his role as Sento Kiryu.

=== Ryuga Banjo ===
Also returning from Kamen Rider Build, Ryuga Banjo (万丈 龍我, Banjō Ryūga) is a former professional fighter who can transform into Kamen Rider Cross-Z (仮面ライダークローズ, Kamen Raidā Kurōzu). Like Sento, he was originally from an alternate reality before Sento merged it with the "prime" Kamen Rider universe.

Due to Another Build's creation, Ryuga lost his memories as Cross-Z before Sougo came to seek Sento's help, causing the Cross-Z Ride Watch to appear in Ryuga's pocket and restore his memories. Ryuga gave it to Sougo before the latter and Geiz travel back to Ryuga's world in 2017 to defeat Another Build's past iteration.

- Year 2017: Ryuga encounters a time-displaced Sougo in 2017 while he and Sento were still in their reality. They would later meet Sougo again, this time with Geiz, as the four of them fought Another Build together. During the fight, Ryuga gradually loses his powers and memories as a Kamen Rider, but Sougo gives him and Sento blank Ride Watches so they can connect with him in the future.

During the events of Kamen Rider Heisei Generations Forever, Ryuga and Sento save Shingo Hisanaga from Another W and encounter Tid before joining forces with the other Heisei Kamen Riders to defeat him.

Eiji Akaso (赤楚 衛二, Akaso Eiji) reprises his role as Ryuga Banjo.

=== Gentoku Himuro ===
Also returning from Kamen Rider Build, Gentoku Himuro (氷室 幻徳, Himuro Gentoku) is the son of Touto's prime minister Taizan as well as the former leader of Faust and head of the Touto Institute who can transform into the first Night Rogue (ナイトローグ, Naito Rōgu) and later Kamen Rider Rogue (仮面ライダーローグ, Kamen Raidā Rōgu).

During the events of Kamen Rider Heisei Generations Forever, Gentoku temporarily recovers his memories and powers before joining Kazumi to assist Sento and Ryuga in combating Another W and joining the Heisei Kamen Riders in their fight against Tid.

Kensei Mikami (水上 剣星, Mikami Kensei) reprises his role as Gentoku Himuro.

=== Kazumi Sawatari ===
Also returning from Kamen Rider Build, Kazumi Sawatari (猿渡 一海, Sawatari Kazumi) is the owner of the Sawatari farm who later became a soldier capable of transforming into Kamen Rider Grease (仮面ライダーグリス, Kamen Raidā Gurisu).

During the events of Kamen Rider Heisei Generations Forever, Kazumi temporarily recovers his memories and powers before joining Gentoku to assist Sento and Ryuga in their fight against Another W and joining the Heisei Kamen Riders in their fight against Tid.

Kouhei Takeda (武田 航平, Takeda Kōhei) reprises his role as Kazumi Sawatari.

=== Misora Isurugi ===
Also returning from Kamen Rider Build, Misora Isurugi (石動 美空, Isurugi Misora) is the daughter of Sōichi Isurugi and ally of Sento's who was temporarily possessed by the Martian Queen Vernage.

During the events of Kamen Rider Heisei Generations Forever, Misora temporarily recovers her memories and assists the Heisei Kamen Riders in their fight against Tid.

Kaho Takada (高田 夏帆, Takada Kaho) reprises her role as Misora Isurugi.

=== Kamen Rider Evol ===
Kamen Rider Evol (仮面ライダーエボル, Kamen Raidā Eboru), a.k.a. Evolto (エボルト, Eboruto), was a sociopathic alien who possessed Soichi and assumed the Blood Stalk (ブラッドスターク, Buraddo Sutāku) identity to further his goals of destroying the Earth before he was eventually defeated by Sento and his allies.

After the Build Ride Watch was destroyed, an alternate reality version of Evolto was brought to Sougo's world to join Swartz's forces. While he managed to defeat Grand Zi-O, Evol was destroyed by Ohma Zi-O.

Instead of being vocally reprised by Tetsuo Kanao (金尾 哲夫, Kanao Tetsuo) or physically reprised by Isurugi's actor Yasuyuki Maekawa (前川 泰之, Maekawa Yasuyuki), Kamen Rider Evol appears in a non-speaking role.

== Kamen Rider Ex-Aid ==
=== Emu Hojo ===
Emu Hojo (宝生 永夢, Hōjō Emu), a young doctor, genius gamer, and titular Rider of Kamen Rider Ex-Aid (仮面ライダーエグゼイド, Kamen Raidā Eguzeido).

In 2018, he initially attacked Sougo and Geiz after mistaking them for enemies before losing most of his memories of being Kamen Rider Ex-Aid due to Another Ex-Aid's creation and giving the Ex-Aid Ride Watch to Sougo.

- Year 2016: Encountering Another Ex-Aid, Emu transforms into Kamen Rider Ex-Aid and assists Sougo and Geiz by fending off the Bugsters summoned by his twisted counterpart until his powers faded away before witnessing Sougo transform into Kamen Rider Zi-O to defeat Another Ex-Aid. Emu is then given a blank Ride Watch to connect with Sougo in the future.

Hiroki Iijima (飯島 寛騎, Iijima Hiroki) reprises his role as Emu Hojo.

=== Hiiro Kagami ===
Also returning from Kamen Rider Ex-Aid, Hiiro Kagami (鏡 飛彩, Kagami Hiiro) is a young prodigy surgeon who can transform into Kamen Rider Brave (仮面ライダーブレイブ, Kamen Raidā Bureibu).

When Sougo and his friends sought out Emu to stop Another Ex-Aid from kidnapping young boys in search of a heart donor for his ailing son, Hiiro was suspicious of their intentions. He later reveals that the boy could have been cured had he been brought to him before he reached the transplant stage. Thanks to Sougo and Geiz's actions in the past, Hiiro was able to cure Iida's son of his heart condition.

Toshiki Seto (瀬戸 利樹, Seto Toshiki) reprises his role as Hiiro Kagami.

=== Kuroto Dan ===
Also returning from Kamen Rider Ex-Aid, Kuroto Dan (檀 黎斗, Dan Kuroto) is one of the orchestrators of the Bugster virus outbreak and the second CEO of Genm Corp. who has a God complex and can transform into Kamen Rider Genm (仮面ライダーゲンム, Kamen Raidā Genmu).

After the events of Ex-Aid and Genm Corp.'s existence were erased following Another Ex-Aid's creation, Kuroto became a game developer for Dan Corp. (檀コーポレーション, Dan Kōporēshon) who was pressured by his perfectionist father until the Time Jacker Heure transforms him into Another OOO (アナザーオーズ, Anazā Ōzu). Within the span of eight years, Kuroto killed his father, established the Dan Foundation (檀ファウンデーション, Dan Faundēshon) mega-corporation, and proceeded to create an independent nation as King Kuroto Dan (檀 黎斗 王, Dan Kuroto Ō). He also kept Eiji Hino and Hina Izumi imprisoned before Sougo freed them by posing as Kuroto's royal guard. While Geiz distracted the present Another OOO, Sougo and Tsukuyomi traveled back in time to defeat the Another Rider's past self.

- Year 2016: As Another OOO, Kuroto committed patricide to usurp his father's position as the CEO of Dan Corp. before facing Geiz with the Genm Armor. However, since it was not the date of his creation and Geiz unknowingly used the wrong Ride Watch, Geiz was forced to retreat as Kuroto revived from his destruction.
- Year 2010: In the middle of his writer's block, Heure transforms Kuroto into Another OOO. However, Sougo appeared after the fact and defeated him with the OOO Armor.

As Another OOO, Kuroto has hawk-like wings for flight capabilities, tiger-like claws for slashing enemies, and grasshopper-like legs for superhuman jumping. Using Cell Medals, he can create or transform people into Waste Yummies. Additionally, he was in possession of the Genm Ride Watch through unknown means until he dropped it when the Taka Watchroid attacked, which Geiz claimed for his own use.

Tetsuya Iwanaga (岩永 徹也, Iwanaga Tetsuya) reprises his role as Kuroto Dan.

=== Masamune Dan ===
Masamune Dan (檀 正宗, Dan Masamune) is the original CEO of Genm Corp. and the father of Kuroto Dan. In the original timeline, he is the mastermind of the Kamen Rider Chronicle MMO project as well as the first and second Bugster outbreaks who can transform into Kamen Rider Cronus (仮面ライダークロノス, Kamen Raidā Kuronosu).

As a result of the Time Jackers' actions, Masamune retained his position as the CEO of Dan Corp. However, his obsession for Kuroto to become successful resulted in his death in 2016 after his son usurped him moments before Geiz and Tsukuyomi arrived too late in an attempt to prevent it.

Instead of being reprised by Hiroyuki Takami (貴水 博之, Takami Hiroyuki), Masamune Dan is portrayed by an unidentified stand-in while photos of his original actor appear within Sougo's Time Mazine so he could track the chronology of Kuroto's rise to power.

=== Kamen Rider Lazer ===
Kamen Rider Lazer (仮面ライダーレーザー, Kamen Raidā Rēzā), a.k.a. Kiriya Kujo (九条 貴利矢, Kujō Kiriya), is one of Emu's allies in the fight against the Bugsters' outbreak.

During the events of Heisei Generations Forever, Lazer aided Ex-Aid alongside the other Heisei Kamen Riders to oppose Tid's forces.

=== Kamen Sentai Gorider ===
Returning from Kamen Rider × Super Sentai: Ultra Super Hero Taisen and their self-titled web sequel series, Kamen Sentai Gorider (仮面戦隊ゴライダー, Kamen Sentai Goraidā) is a Kamen Rider/Super Sentai hybrid team composed of Aka-Rider (アカライダー, Akaraidā), Ao-Rider (アオライダー, Aoraidā), Ki-Rider (キライダー, Kiraidā), Momo-Rider (モモライダー, Momoraidā) and Mido-Rider (ミドライダー, Midoraidā).

In Kamen Rider Zi-O the Movie: Over Quartzer, the Goriders appear from a bystander's tablet as part of the Heisei Riders' reinforcements against the Quartzers' Kasshine army.

=== Kamen Rider Fuma ===
Kamen Rider Fuma (仮面ライダー風魔, Kamen Raidā Fūma), a.k.a. Kagenari Nagumo (南雲 影成, Nagumo Kagenari) was an executive of the foreign video game company Machina Vision (マキナビジョン, Makina Bijon) who sought to turn the world into a virtual reality for his daughter before he was foiled by Ex-Aid and his allies.

In an alternate reality, Nagumo succeeded in his plans before he is summoned to Another World by Swartz to help him achieve his goals, only to be destroyed by Kamen Rider Woz.

Instead of being reprised by Yoshikuni Dōchin (堂珍 嘉邦, Dōchin Yoshikuni), he appears in a non-speaking role.

=== Gamedeus ===
Gamedeus (ゲムデウス, Gemudeusu) is the final boss Bugster created by Kuroto for Kamen Rider Chronicle.

An alternate reality version of Gamedeus was brought to Sougo's world following the Ex-Aid Ride Watch's destruction. Assisting Swartz in destroying the Kamen Rider multiverse, Gamedeus defeated Grand Zi-O until he was killed by Ohma Zi-O.

Instead of being reprised by Masashi Sugawara (菅原 正志, Sugawara Masashi), he appears in a non-speaking role.

== Kamen Rider Fourze ==
=== Kamen Rider Fourze ===
Kamen Rider Fourze (仮面ライダーフォーゼ, Kamen Raidā Fōze), a.k.a. Gentaro Kisaragi (如月 弦太朗, Kisaragi Gentarō), is an alumnus and teacher of Amanogawa High School.

Despite having given up the Fourze Driver during the events of the crossover film Kamen Rider × Kamen Rider Wizard & Fourze: Movie War Ultimatum, his history as Fourze is erased by Another Fourze's creation. At the height of the Another Rider's killing spree, Gentaro goes off to investigate.

- Year 2011: Kisaragi's fight with the Scorpion Zodiarts is interrupted by Another Fourze's creation, causing both the Rider's power and the Horoscope to vanish. At some later point in time, Sougo gives Kisaragi a blank Ride Watch to connect with in the future, which the latter entrusted to Ohsugi.

Instead of being reprised by Sota Fukushi (福士 蒼汰, Fukushi Sōta), Gentaro Kisaragi is portrayed by an unidentified stand-in. (Note: According to episode 6.5 of Kamen Rider Zi-O: Supplementary Plan, Kisaragi's actor was unable to reprise his role as he was busy filming for Bleach. As neither Sota nor Ryusei Sakuta's actor Ryo Yoshizawa were available to return, the showrunners had to merge the Fourze arc with the Kamen Rider 555 arc to compensate.)

=== Chuta Ohsugi ===
Returning from Kamen Rider Fourze, Chuta Ohsugi (大杉 忠太, Ōsugi Chūta) is a geography teacher at Amanogawa High School who serves as an academic advisor to the Kamen Rider Club. Kisaragi entrusts him with the Fourze Ride Watch so he can give it to Sougo and Geiz on Kisaragi's behalf.

Takushi Tanaka (田中 卓志, Tanaka Takushi) reprises his role as Chuta Ohsugi.

=== Daita Kondo and Chikao Nezu ===
Returning from the film Kamen Rider × Kamen Rider Wizard & Fourze: Movie War Ultimatum, Daita Kondo (近藤 大太, Kondō Daita) and Chikao Nezu (根津 誓夫, Nezu Chikao) are members of the Monster League, a team of psychic students who were manipulated by Kageto Banba, until they are reformed into the Youth League.

As a result of Another Fourze's creation, Daita and Chikao became members of the Kamen Rider Club, assisting Sougo and his friends when Another Fourze attacks Amanogawa High School.

Kazuyoshi Nakazawa (中澤 兼利, Nakazawa Kazuyoshi) and Yuya Hara (原 勇弥, Hara Yūya) reprise their roles as Daita Kondo and Chikao Nezu respectively.

=== Stardust Ninja Dustards ===
Stardust Ninja Dustards (星屑忍者ダスタード, Hoshikuzu Ninja Dasutādo) are ninja-themed foot soldiers of the Horoscopes.

In a possible future in 2022, the Dustards joined Yaminin's Niji no Hebi and fight Kamen Rider Shinobi.

=== Sagittarius Zodiarts ===
The Sagittarius Zodiarts (サジタリウス・ゾディアーツ, Sajitariusu Zodiātsu), a.k.a. Mitsuaki Gamou (我望 光明, Gamō Mitsuaki), was the chairman of Amanogawa High School's board who sought to find the Presenters by using his students' negative emotions.

An alternate reality version of the Sagittarius Zodiarts was brought to Sougo's world following the Fourze Ride Watch's destruction. Assisting Swartz in destroying the Kamen Rider multiverse, Sagittarius defeats Grand Zi-O before he is killed by Ohma Zi-O.

Instead of being reprised by Shingo Tsurumi (鶴見 辰吾, Tsurumi Shingo), the Sagittarius Zodiarts appears in a non-speaking role.

== Kamen Rider 555 ==
=== Takumi Inui ===
Takumi Inui (乾 巧, Inui Takumi) is a passive loner and the primary wearer of the Faiz Gear, which allows him transform into the titular Kamen Rider Faiz (仮面ライダーファイズ, Kamen Raidā Faizu). He is also an evolved human known as an Orphnoch; in particular, the Wolf Orphnoch (ウルフオルフェノク, Urufu Orufenoku).

While he was originally supposed to have died during the events of Kamen Rider 4, the Time Jackers altered Takumi's timeline when they created Another Faiz, who negated the genesis of the Orphnochs and averted the creation of the Rider Gear technology. In 2018, after learning his rival Kusaka kidnapped high school student Karin Yamabuki, Takumi goes after him to find out why and learns about the situation regarding her and Another Faiz. He regained his original timeline memories and fate after meeting Sougo and gives the Faiz Ride Watch to Geiz.

- Year 2003: Takumi loses his ability to become Faiz during his battle with the Elephant Orphnoch. Sougo later hands him a blank Ride Watch off-screen so they can connect in the future.

Kento Handa (半田 健人, Handa Kento) reprises his role as Takumi Inui.

=== Masato Kusaka ===
Also returning from Kamen Rider 555, Masato Kusaka (草加 雅人, Kusaka Masato) is a selfish, manipulative young man and Ryusei School alumnus with an extreme hatred for all Orphnochs, including Takumi. He is also the primary wearer of the Kaixa Gear, which allows him to transform into Kamen Rider Kaixa (仮面ライダーカイザ, Kamen Raidā Kaiza).

Originally supposed to have died at the hands of Yuji Kiba, Another Faiz's creation altered the timeline and averted his death, though Kusaka maintains his hatred for Takumi. In 2018, he met Amanogawa High School student and fellow Ryusei School alumnus Karin Yamabuki, who asked for his help in stopping Another Faiz from killing girls to prolong her life by killing her. Kusaka agreed to do so out of mercy for her before Sougo's group and Takumi got involved and defeated Another Faiz in the past.

In Kamen Rider Zi-O Next Time: Geiz Majesty, Masato saves Geiz, Sougo, and Tsukuyomi from a Kasshine before leaving with Daiki Kaito.

Kōhei Murakami (村上 幸平, Murakami Kōhei) reprises his role as Masato Kusaka.

=== Mari Sonoda ===
Mari Sonoda (園田 真理, Sonoda Mari) is a graduate of the Ryusei School who entrusted Takumi with the Faiz Gear.

- Year 2003: Mari was about to be crushed by the Elephant Orphnoch until Another Faiz's creation removed the monster from existence.

Instead of being reprised by Yuria Haga (芳賀 優里亜, Haga Yuria), archival footage from Kamen Rider 555 episode two was reused to represent her appearance.

== Kamen Rider Wizard ==
=== Kamen Rider Wizard ===
Kamen Rider Wizard (仮面ライダーウィザード, Kamen Raidā Wizādo), a.k.a. Haruto Soma (操真 晴人, Sōma Haruto), was a former soccer player who became a hope bringer wizard after he survives being turned into a Phantom during the Sabbath ritual.

- Year 2012: Wizard's fight against the Phantom, Phoenix, was interrupted by the creation of Another Wizard, erasing his powers and the Phantom from existence.

Instead of being reprised by Shunya Shiraishi (白石 隼也, Shiraishi Shunya), Haruto Soma is portrayed by an unidentified stand-in.

=== Kosuke Nito ===
Returning from Kamen Rider Wizard, Kosuke Nito (仁藤 攻介, Nitō Kōsuke) is a young, mayonnaise loving archaeologist who discovered the Beast Driver, which he uses to transform into Kamen Rider Beast (仮面ライダービースト, Kamen Raidā Bīsuto).

Despite losing his memories and powers, he stalks Geiz while Another Wizard is active. After temporarily regaining his memories, Nito tests Geiz's strength and gives him the Wizard Ride Watch as a reward, but keeps the Beast Ride Watch for himself. After Geiz travels to 2012 to defeat Another Wizard, he meets Nito off-screen to give him two blank Ride Watches so they can connect in the future.

Tasuku Nagase (永瀬 匡, Nagase Tasuku) reprises his role as Kosuke Nito.

== Kamen Rider OOO ==
=== Eiji Hino ===
Eiji Hino (火野 映司, Hino Eiji) is a wandering vagabond and the titular Rider of Kamen Rider OOO (仮面ライダーオーズ, Kamen Raidā Ōzu).

Due to Another OOO's creation, Eiji abandoned his ways as a wanderer to become a member of parliament to help the needy. When the Dan Foundation tried to gain independence from Japan, he was held hostage by King Kuroto Dan. After being rescued by Sougo, who respected his down-to-earth attitude despite his current job, Eiji took interest in the youth's dream to become a king and gives him the OOO and Tajadol Combo Ride Watches.

- Year 2010: After he attempted to destroy the Neko Yummy, the birth of Another OOO caused Eiji to lose his powers. Sougo later gave him two blank Ride Watches off-screen so they can connect in the future.

Shu Watanabe (渡部 秀, Watanabe Shū) reprises his role as Eiji Hino.

=== Hina Izumi ===
Also returning from Kamen Rider OOO, Hina Izumi (泉 比奈, Izumi Hina) is girl with superhuman strength and friend of Eiji's who dreamed of becoming a fashion designer.

As a result of Another OOO's creation, Hina never met Eiji and became King Kuroto Dan's fashion designer before being imprisoned to be groomed as his queen, though Sougo freed her and defeated Kuroto in the past.

Riho Takada (高田 里穂, Takada Riho) reprises her role as Hina Izumi.

=== Michal Minato ===
Returning from Kamen Rider × Kamen Rider Fourze & OOO: Movie War Mega Max, Michal Minato (湊 ミハル, Minato Miharu) is a young man from the year 2050 who acquired the means to become one of the "primary" timeline's known future Kamen Riders, Kamen Rider Aqua (仮面ライダーアクア, Kamen Raidā Akua) via the Aqua Driver (アクアドライバー, Akua Doraibā).

Using a prototype Time Mazine, Michal travels to 2019 to retrieve Tsukuyomi and Geiz before getting caught up in the Time Riders' final battle against Swartz and his Another World army. He would later sacrifice himself to save Sougo from Swartz.

Atsushi Arai (荒井 敦史, Arai Atsushi) reprises his role as Michal Minato.

=== Akira Date ===
Also returning from Kamen Rider OOO, Akira Date (伊達 明, Date Akira) is a traveling combat medic and one of the primary users of the Kamen Rider Birth (仮面ライダーバース, Kamen Raidā Bāsu) system.

In Kamen Rider Zi-O Next Time: Geiz, Majesty, Akira saves Geiz and Tsukuyomi from a Kasshine unit.

Hiroaki Iwanaga (岩永 洋昭, Iwanaga Hiroaki) reprises his role as Akira Date.

== Kamen Rider Gaim ==
=== Kota Kazuraba ===
Kota Kazuraba (葛葉 紘汰, Kazuraba Kōta) is an earnest and cheerful part-time job seeking young adult, mascot of the Beat Rider dance team "Team Gaim", and the titular Rider of Kamen Rider Gaim (仮面ライダー鎧武, Kamen Raidā Gaimu) who became the god-like Man of the Beginning at the end of the series.

In the altered timeline following Another Gaim's creation, Kota was separated into a normal human and his godhood. While Zi-O defeated Another Gaim, the Man of the Beginning undid the Another Rider's destruction and reprimanded Sougo for lacking faith in Geiz before sending him back in time to help his ally. Along the way, Sougo met the human Kota, who got a job at Drupers and gave him the Gaim and Kodama Ride Watches.

- Year 2013: In the midst of a fight with a pair of Inves, Kota lost his Rider powers. He would later receive blank Ride Watches from Sougo to connect with him in the future.

Gaku Sano (佐野 岳, Sano Gaku) reprises his role as Kouta Kazuraba.

=== Kaito Kumon ===
Also returning from Kamen Rider Gaim, Kaito Kumon (駆紋 戒斗, Kumon Kaito) is the former leader of the Beat Rider dance team, Team Baron, who can transform into Kamen Rider Baron (仮面ライダーバロン, Kamen Raidā Baron) and later the Overlord-like Lord Baron (ロード・バロン, Rōdo Baron) before he was killed in a final battle with Kota at the end of the series.

In the altered timeline following Another Gaim's creation, Kaito and several of his team members were sent into the Helheim Forest by former member, Asura, who desired leadership of the dance group for himself and became Another Gaim to do so. Kaito managed to survive the forest on his own through unknown means and meets Geiz after Another Gaim sent him to the Helheim Forest as well. Kaito chastises Geiz for his hesitation and shows him a Crack portal, which the latter eventually uses to escape. After two iterations of Kamen Rider Zi-O defeat Another Gaim in different time periods, Kaito and his teammates are rescued from Helheim.

Yutaka Kobayashi (小林 豊, Kobayashi Yutaka) reprises his role as Kaito Kumon.

=== Kamen Rider Zangetsu ===
Kamen Rider Zangetsu (仮面ライダー斬月, Kamen Raidā Zangetsu), a.k.a. Takatora Kureshima (呉島 貴虎, Kureshima Takatora), is the former project leader of the Yggdrasill Corporation's Research and Development branch. During the events of the stage play, Kamen Rider Zangetsu: Gaim Gaiden, and the V-Cinema film Gaim Gaiden: Kamen Rider Gridon vs. Kamen Rider Bravo, he became Kamen Rider Zangetsu Kachidoki Arms (カチドキアームズ, Kachidoki Āmuzu).

In Kamen Rider Zi-O the Movie: Over Quartzer, Zangetsu Kachidoki Arms appeared from his stage play's poster as part of the Heisei Kamen Riders' reinforcements against the Quartzers' Kasshine army.

Instead of being reprised by Yuki Kubota (久保田 悠来, Kubota Yūki), Kamen Rider Zangetsu appears in a non-speaking role.

== Kamen Rider Ghost ==
=== Takeru Tenkūji ===
Takeru Tenkūji (天空寺 タケル, Tenkūji Takeru) is the current heir to the Daitenkū-ji Buddhist temple and the titular Rider of Kamen Rider Ghost (仮面ライダーゴースト, Kamen Raidā Gōsuto).

As a result of the Time Jackers creating Another Ghost, Takeru loses his Rider powers, but retains his spiritual abilities. Alongside members of the Mysterious Phenomenon Institute, he investigated the disappearances his monstrous counterpart perpetrated for three years until Sougo and Geiz got involved. After Sougo's spirit gets separated from his body, Takeru's Ride Watch allows him to perceive the youth before Narita uses "Shiranui" spray to render his spirit visible to mortals. Takeru then takes Sougo's place in order to travel back to 2015 and prevent Another Ghost's host from dying and being turned. Sougo is returned to his body, but as Takeru is attacked by Heure, he is rescued by Makoto. He temporarily regains his powers, but fails to prevent Another Ghost from being created again, causing Sougo's soul to separate from his body once more. Once his soul was permanently restored to his body, Sougo would later give Takeru's past iteration a blank Ride Watch off-screen so they can connect in the future.

Shun Nishime (西銘 駿, Nishime Shun) reprises his role as Takeru Tenkūji. (Note: In episode 13.5 of the Kamen Rider Zi-O: Supplementary Plan, Nishime revealed that Takeru was meant to appear in the early episodes of Kamen Rider Zi-O, but due to scheduling conflicts, his Rider's corresponding Ride Watch debuted first.)

=== Makoto Fukami ===
Also returning from Kamen Rider Ghost, Makoto Fukami (深海 マコト, Fukami Makoto), born Riyon (リヨン), is Takeru's childhood friend and an artificial human who can transform into Kamen Rider Specter (仮面ライダースペクター, Kamen Raidā Supekutā).

- Year 2015: Makoto appears in the midst of a Gamma Commando attack before joining forces with a time-displaced Takeru to defeat them prior to Another Ghost's resurrection.

Ryosuke Yamamoto (山本 涼介, Yamamoto Ryōsuke) reprises his role as Makoto Fukami.

=== Shibuya and Narita ===
Also returning from Kamen Rider Ghost, Shibuya Hachiōji (八王子 シブヤ, Hachiōji Shibuya) and Narita Kisarazu (木更津 ナリタ, Kisarazu Narita) are two ascetic monks from Daitenkū-ji and allies of Takeru's.

Takuya Mizoguchi (溝口 琢矢, Mizoguchi Takuya) and Reo Kansyuji (勧修寺 玲旺, Kanshūji Reo) reprise their roles as Shibuya and Narita respectively.

=== Kamen Rider Dark Ghost ===
Returning from Kamen Rider Ghost: The 100 Eyecons and Ghost's Fated Moment, Kamen Rider Dark Ghost (仮面ライダーダークゴースト, Kamen Raidā Dāku Gōsuto), a.k.a. Argos (アルゴス, Arugosu), was the first born son of Adonis before he succumbed to a plague and was resurrected as a Gamma and attempted to turn the world's inhabitants into ghosts before he was defeated by Takeru.

In an alternate reality, Argos succeeded in his plans before he was summoned to Another World by Swartz to help him achieve his goals, only to be destroyed by Kamen Rider Geiz.

Instead of being reprised by Ryo Kimura (木村 了, Kimura Ryō), Kamen Rider Dark Ghost appears in a non-speaking role.

== Kamen Rider Decade ==
=== Tsukasa Kadoya ===
Tsukasa Kadoya (門矢 士, Kadoya Tsukasa) is a photographer who was initially the infamous Destroyer of Worlds Kamen Rider Decade (仮面ライダーディケイド, Kamen Raidā Dikeido) and the former leader of the interdimensional Dai-Shocker organization before he lost his memory and aided various alternate versions of his Kamen Rider predecessors in averting a dimensional convergence that threatened all of reality. While Tsukasa was initially capable of harnessing the powers of his predecessors via the DecaDriver, he gained an upgraded version called the Neo DecaDriver (ネオディケイドライバー, Neo Dikeidoraibā), which allows him to harness the powers of his successor Riders, including Zi-O. However, he stored half of his newly acquired powers into the Decade Ride Watch and gave it to Zi-O.

Seeking to change Sougo's destiny of becoming Ohma Zi-O, Tsukasa assumes his previous title as the Destroyer of Worlds to oversee and destroy Sougo's world if he fails in his mission. He first makes himself known while assisting the Time Jackers and Another Ghost by giving Sougo the Decade Ride Watch before sending the youth and Tsukuyomi to the year 2068 so the former can get a glance at his future self. Following this, Tsukasa traveled to April 24, 2009 and posed as the driver of the bus that a young Sougo was riding before Swartz attacked and caused the bus accident Sougo survived. Tsukasa later saved Tsukuyomi from being a casualty and brings her through time to Ohma's Day, where Swartz selected Sougo to become Zi-O before taking her to the year 2058 to help her learn the truth behind her powers.

Following Hiryū Kakogawa becoming Another Zi-O II and causing a time distortion that allowed him to become the tyrannical lord of the present day, Tsukasa helped Sougo recover his allies' memories after they were altered in the distortion while aiding a rebellion against Another Zi-O II. However, Swartz stole the remaining half of Tsukasa's Rider powers to turn himself into Another Decade so he can destroy the Kamen Rider multiverse. Having retained his ability to manipulate dimensional walls however, Tsukasa brought Sougo to Swartz's Another World, where he trapped people in order to summon Dark Riders to fight for him, so he can destroy it and save Swartz's victims. While protecting Sougo and Tsukuyomi from Swartz, Tsukasa regained the Decade Ride Watch to take back the Rider powers he stored in it and save Daiki from the Zi-O II Another Watch's control alongside Sougo. After helping the Time Riders defeat Swartz and save the Kamen Rider multiverse, Tsukasa leaves to see how the timeline has changed from afar.

A past iteration of Tsukasa appeared during the events of Heisei Generations Forever and Over Quartzer to assist the Heisei Kamen Riders against Tid and the Quartzers respectively using his original DecaDriver.

During the events of the special episode Rider Time: Kamen Rider Decade vs. Zi-O: The Decade House Death Game, Tsukasa arrived at the titular game and reunited with Yusuke Onodera before attempting to lure Sougo to the game. While traveling through various realities, he encountered an alternate universe version of Sougo, who asked him to give the Saber Ride Watch to the "prime" Sougo.

During the events of Rider Time: Kamen Rider Zi-O vs. Decade: Seven Of Zi-O!, Tsukasa traveled through the Rider multiverse to hunt various alternate reality versions of Sougo. In the process, he gained an upgraded version of his original Complete Form called Complete Form 21 (コンプリートフォーム21, Konpurīto Fōmu Tuenti Wan), which grants him combined usage of all 20 of the Heisei Riders' final form powers as well as Kamen Rider Zero-Two. However, he was defeated by Ohma Zi-O and disappeared, though he gives the "prime" Sougo the Saber Ride Watch. Despite what happened, Woz declares Tsukasa will return.

Masahiro Inoue (井上 正大, Inoue Masahiro) reprises his role as Tsukasa Kadoya.

=== Daiki Kaito ===
Also returning from Kamen Rider Decade, Daiki Kaito (海東 大樹, Kaitō Daiki) is a dimension-hopping treasure hunter who becomes Kamen Rider Diend (仮面ライダーディエンド, Kamen Raidā Diendo) after escaping his dictatorial world and obtaining the DienDriver, which allows him to summon holographic duplicates of past Riders. During his travels, Daiki forms a friendly rivalry with Tsukasa as they occasionally join forces against the Dai-Shocker army. Sometime before the events of Kamen Rider Zi-O, Daiki acquired the Neo DienDriver (ネオディエンドライバー, Neo Diendoraibā), which allows him to summon Kamen Riders that succeeded his original era.

Daiki appears in the World of Zi-O to steal the Time Riders' Ride Watches, though Sougo steals them back. He later takes White Woz's Future Note as compensation before being contacted by Ohma Zi-O, who has him use a dimensional wall to contact his past self and Geiz. Daiki later returns during Hiryū's time distortion to acquire the Zi-O II Another Watch and use the Time Jackers to secretly help Sougo regain the Grand Zi-O Ride Watch after they stole it.

Sometime later, Daiki used the Zi-O II Another Watch's power to revive Tsukasa after he was killed by Swartz, but the device corrupts him and possesses his body. When Tsukasa gets his Rider powers back, he uses Zi-O's powers and works with Grand Zi-O to save Daiki from the Another Watch's control; destroying it in the process. Following this, Daiki joins the heroes in foiling Swartz's plot to destroy the Kamen Rider multiverse before leaving with Tsukasa to see how the timeline has changed after Sougo changed his destiny.

In the special Kamen Rider Zi-O Next Time: Geiz Majesty, Daiki helps Geiz in his fight against a new White Woz, who had stolen his powers. After helping Sougo and Tsukuyomi regain their powers, Daiki used his Secondary Rider Cards to temporarily grant Geiz the Geiz Majesty Ride Watch so he can defeat White Woz as Another Diend and regain his own powers.

Kimito Totani (戸谷 公人, Totani Kimito) reprises his role as Daiki Kaito.

=== Kamen Rider G ===
Returning from a special meant to commemorate Kamen Rider Decade and the 10th Heisei Kamen Rider series, Kamen Rider G (仮面ライダーG, Kamen Raidā Jī), a.k.a. Goro (吾郎, Gorō), is a man who was previously brainwashed into joining the terrorist organization, Shade. When his girlfriend, Eri Hinata, was threatened, Goro regains his memory and becomes the eponymous wine-themed Rider to save the world from Shade's terrorism.

During the events of Over Quartzer, Kamen Rider G appeared as part of the Heisei Riders' reinforcements against the Quartzers' forces.

Instead of being reprised by Goro Inagaki (稲垣 吾郎, Inagaki Gorō), Kamen Rider G appears in a non-speaking role.

=== Yusuke Onodera ===
Also returning from Kamen Rider Decade, Yusuke Onodera (小野寺 ユウスケ, Onodera Yūsuke) is an alternate universe version of Yusuke Godai and the Kamen Rider Kuuga from an A.R. World who joined Tsukasa on his travels.

He appears in the special episode Rider Time: Kamen Rider Decade vs. Zi-O: The Decade House Death Game, participating in Tsukasa's party of Kamen Riders competing in the King's Death Game against True Sougo, only to be easily defeated. Additionally, an alternate version of Onodera cheats his way into the game by pretending to be Tsukasa's Onodera and murdering most of the participants before he is killed in turned by Ohma Zi-O, who deems Onodera unfit to be his host.

Ryouta Murai (村井 良大, Murai Ryōta) reprises his role as Yusuke Onodera.

=== Narutaki ===
Narutaki (鳴滝) is a mysterious man who sees Tsukasa as a menace.

In Rider Time: Kamen Rider Decade vs. Zi-O: The Decade House Death Game, Narutaki becomes a servant of Ohma Zi-O and instigates the King Death Game, forcing kidnapped victims to participate in it. However as he grew bored of his role, Narutaki decided to seek Tsukasa's help in stopping Ohma Zi-O.

Tatsuhito Okuda (奥田 達士, Okuda Tatsuhito) reprises his role as Narutaki.

=== Kamen Rider Kivala ===
Kamen Rider Kivala (仮面ライダーキバーラ, Kamen Raidā Kibāra), a.k.a. Natsumi Hikari (光 夏海, Hikari Natsumi), is a worker at her grandfather's photo studio.

Instead of being reprised by Kanna Mori (森 カンナ, Mori Kanna), Kamen Rider Kivala is voiced by an unidentified voice actress.

== Kamen Rider W ==
=== Kamen Rider W ===
Kamen Rider W (仮面ライダーW (ダブル), Kamen Raidā Daburu), is the titular two-in-one detective Kamen Rider and member of the Narumi Detective Agency who transforms via a pair of Double Drivers and Gaia Memories. During the events of Kamen Rider Heisei Generations Forever, Kamen Rider W's past iteration joined forces with the Heisei Kamen Riders to combat Tid's forces.

- Shotaro Hidari (左 翔太郎, Hidari Shōtarō) is the left-half and primary body of Kamen Rider W. While he was absent when Another W was created, Shotaro was in possession of the W Ride Watch before he entrusted it to the Master of Fuumen.
- Philip (フィリップ, Firippu), born Raito Sonozaki (園咲 来人, Sonozaki Raito), is the right-half and mind of Kamen Rider W. While he was absent when Another W was created, Black Woz was able to access his Gaia Library.

Instead of being reprised by Renn Kiriyama (桐山 漣, Kiriyama Renn) and Masaki Suda (菅田 将暉, Suda Masaki) respectively, Kamen Rider W appeared in a non-speaking role. (Note: While no word on Shotaro Hidari's original actor, Kiriyama's, availability was made public, according to Philip's original actor, Suda, he almost appeared on-screen, but his working schedule was solid booked for another two years at the time.)

=== Master of Fuumen ===
Returning from Kamen Rider W, the Master (マスター, Masutā) is the owner of the "Fuumen" (風麺, Fūmen) ramen cart in Futo. During the events of Kamen Rider Heisei Generations Forever, he gives the W Ride Watch to Sougo, per Shotaro's wish, during the youth and Ataru Hisanaga's visit to his cart.

Hiroshi Doki (道木 広志, Dōki Hiroshi) reprises his role as the Master of Fuumen.

=== Katsumi Daido ===
Returning from Kamen Rider W Forever: A to Z/The Gaia Memories of Fate and its prequel Kamen Rider W Returns: Kamen Rider Eternal, Katsumi Daido (大道 克己, Daidō Katsumi) is the leader of a band of reanimated mercenaries called NEVER who can transform into Kamen Rider Eternal (仮面ライダーエターナル, Kamen Raidā Etānaru).

In an alternate reality, Daido succeeded in destroying Futo before being summoned to Another World by Swartz to help him achieve his goals. Along the way, he fought Kamen Riders Zi-O and Aqua and was tricked by the former into destroying Another World and return Swartz's victims to the real world. While Sougo apologizes for the deception, Daido shows him respect as he is content with reuniting with his NEVER comrades before fading away.

Mitsuru Matsuoka (松岡 充, Matsuoka Mitsuru) of the band SOPHIA reprises his role as Katsumi Daido.

=== Utopia Dopant ===
The Utopia Dopant (ユートピア・ドーパント, Yūtopia Dōpanto), a.k.a. Jun Kazu (加頭 順, Kazu Jun), was a researcher from Foundation X who acted as a liaison to whoever the Museum allied themselves with.

An alternate reality version of the Utopia Dopant was brought to Sougo's world following the W Ride Watch's destruction. Assisting Another Decade in his efforts to destroy the Kamen Rider multiverse, Utopia defeated Grand Zi-O's Gaim Pine Arms until he was killed by Ohma Zi-O.

Instead of being reprised by Gong Teyu (コン・テユ, Kon Teyu), the Utopia Dopant appears in a non-speaking role.

=== Ryu Terui ===
Also returning from Kamen Rider W, Ryu Terui (照井 竜, Terui Ryū) is the Superintendent of the Futo Police Department's Paranormal Crime Investigation Division (超常犯罪捜査課, Chōjō Hanzai Sōsaka) who can become Kamen Rider Accel (仮面ライダーアクセル, Kamen Raidā Akuseru).

In Kamen Rider Zi-O Next Time: Geiz, Majesty, Ryu came to Sougo's high school to investigate the Kasshine unit's attack and later helped Geiz and Tsukuyomi when they went to rescue Sougo.

Minehiro Kinomoto (木ノ本 嶺浩, Kinomoto Minehiro) reprises his role as Ryu Terui.

== Kamen Rider Den-O ==
=== Ryotaro Nogami ===
Ryotaro Nogami (野上 良太郎, Nogami Ryōtarō) is a jinxed orphan who was recruited by Hana and Owner of the DenLiner to become the eponymous Rider of Kamen Rider Den-O (仮面ライダー電王, Kamen Raidā Den'ō) via the Tarōs due to his status as a singularity, which makes him immune to changes in the timeline.

During the events of Kamen Rider Heisei Generations Forever, Ryotaro and the DenLiner Police teleport Sougo's party, Another Den-O, and his minions into the KingLiner before the Tarōs take turns possessing their old comrade to defeat their monstrous doppelganger. Although Ryotaro remains possessed by Urataros afterward, Momotaros saw through the deception and assured their human partner that he would always be remembered.

Takeru Satoh (佐藤 健, Satō Takeru) reprises his role as the original adult Ryotaro Nogami. (Note: Satoh's return was suggested by producer Shinichiro Shirakura, as none of the production crew were aware of it. To ensure that Satoh's participation would remain hidden, Shirakura advised the media to only expose the former's presence during the movie's premiere date.)

=== Tarōs ===
Also returning from Kamen Rider Den-O, the Tarōs (タロウズ, Tarōzu), are a quartet of four benevolent Imagin who formed contracts with Ryotaro Nogami to help him transform into Kamen Rider Den-O and take up residence within the time traveling bullet train, the DenLiner (デンライナー, Denrainā). Following the end of the series, they founded the DenLiner Police (デンライナーポリス, Denrainā Porisu) to keep rogue Imagin in check.

During the events of Heisei Generations Forever, Ryotaro's status as a singularity allow the Tarōs to retain their powers while they saved Sougo's party and defeated Another Den-O. A year later, when the DenLiner becomes stranded in 2019, they crossed paths with Sougo and his friends again while enlisting Sougo's great-uncle Junichirō to help repair the DenLiner. However, a new Another Den-O attempts to steal it in order to prevent his sister's death. In the midst of this, the monster winds up bringing most of the Tarōs and Junichirō along with him. However, Momotaros avoided being kidnapped by possessing Geiz and relinquished his Rider powers so he can give Sougo the Den-O Ride Watch. Using the newly acquired Ride Watch to transform into Grand Zi-O, Sougo used his new powers to summon a past iteration of Momotaros so the present day Tarōs could combine with him to form Kamen Rider Den-O Climax Form and aid Grand Zi-O and Kamen Rider Zeronos in destroying Another Den-O II and a pack of Mole Imagin.

- Momotaros (モモタロス, Momotarosu) is a hot-headed oni-themed Imagin and the leader of the Tarōs who represents the well-known Den-O Sword Form. After the first Another Den-O was defeated, Momotaros independently went off to join the Heisei Riders in the battle against Tid's forces. When Another Den-O II was created, Momotaros relinquished his Rider powers on behalf of the Tarōs after handing Sougo the Den-O Ride Watch. His voice role is reprised by Toshihiko Seki (関 俊彦, Seki Toshihiko)
- Urataros (ウラタロス, Uratarosu) is a flirtatious sea turtle-themed Imagin who represents Den-O Rod Form. His voice role is reprised by Kōji Yusa (遊佐 浩二, Yusa Kōji).
- Kintaros (キンタロス, Kintarosu) is a noble bear-themed Imagin who represents Den-O Axe Form. His voice role is reprised by Masaki Terasoma (てらそま まさき, Terasoma Masaki).
- Ryutaros (リュウタロス, Ryūtarosu) is a childish dragon-themed Imagin who represents Den-O Gun Form. His voice role is reprised by Kenichi Suzumura (鈴村 健一, Suzumura Ken'ichi).

=== Owner ===
Also returning from Kamen Rider Den-O, the Owner (オーナー, Ōnā) is the owner of the DenLiner.

During the events of Kamen Rider Heisei Generations Forever, the Owner assisted the KingLiner crew and the DenLiner Police in helping Sougo's party combat the first Another Den-O.

Kenjirō Ishimaru (石丸 謙二郎, Ishimaru Kenjirō) reprises his role as the Owner.

=== Yuto Sakurai ===
Also returning from Kamen Rider Den-O, Yuto Sakurai (桜井 侑斗, Sakurai Yūto) is the owner of the ZeroLiner train and a former high school student prior to being recruited by his future self to stop rogue Imagin. Forming a contract with the Imagin Deneb, Yuto becomes Kamen Rider Zeronos (仮面ライダーゼロノス, Kamen Raidā Zeronosu) and worked with Ryotaro to stop rogue Imagin from altering the timeline.

When Another Den-O II attacked, Yuto attempted to eliminate Sougo and prevent Ohma Zi-O's existence in 2068. In the midst of their conflict, the Time Rider initially mistook him for the current Kamen Rider Hibiki, Kyosuke Kiriya, due to their near-identical appearances. Yuto and Deneb eventually assisted Sougo, Geiz, and Den-O in defeating Another Den-O II.

Yūichi Nakamura (中村 優一, Nakamura Yūichi) reprises his role as Yuto Sakurai, as well as the Oni Rider Kyosuke Kiriya.

=== Deneb ===
Also returning from Kamen Rider Den-O, Deneb (デネブ, Denebu) is an Imagin contracted to Yuto Sakurai who serves as his butler while on the ZeroLiner and the subject of his abuse and scolding.

Hōchū Ōtsuka (大塚 芳忠, Ōtsuka Hōchū) reprises his voice role as Deneb.

=== Mole Imagin ===
Also returning from Kamen Rider Den-O, the Mole Imagin (モールイマジン, Mōru Imajin) are a sub-faction of the rogue Imagin who serve as foot soldiers.

In 2019, a Mole Imagin made a contract with Yukihiro Ōsumi, the boyfriend of Takuya Endō's late sister Sayuri, who regretted her death and unwittingly made a contract with him. After Takuya becomes the second Another Den-O to travel back in time and prevent Sayuri's death, Yukihiro begs the Imagin to stop Takuya's rampage on her behalf. Later on, a pack of Mole Imagin aligned themselves with Takuya, only to be defeated by the combined forces of Grand Zi-O, Den-O, and Zeronos.

The Mole Imagin is voiced by Akira Sasanuma (笹沼 晃, Sasanuma Akira).

=== Kamen Rider Yuuki Hijack Form ===
Returning from Saraba Kamen Rider Den-O: Final Countdown, Kamen Rider Yuuki Hijack Form (仮面ライダー幽汽 ハイジャックフォーム, Kamen Raidā Yūki Haijakku Fōmu), a.k.a. Shiro (死郎, Shirō), is a necromancer with the ability to revive Imagin and humans alike who sought to resurrect his lover by switching the worlds of the living and dead before he was defeated by Ryotaro, Momotaros, and Kotaro Nogami.

In an alternate reality, Shiro accomplished his goals before he was summoned to Another World by Swartz to help him achieve his own goals. While fighting Kamen Rider Aqua, Yuuki vanished after Zi-O tricked Kamen Rider Eternal into destroying Another World.

Instead of being reprised by Yu-ki Matsumura (松村 雄基, Matsumura Yūki), Kamen Rider Yuuki Hijack Form appears in a non-speaking role.

== Kamen Rider Ryuki ==
=== Shinji Kido ===
Shinji Kido (城戸 真司, Kido Shinji) is a reporter for the ORE Journal who was given a blank Advent Card Deck and forms a contract with the dragon-like Mirror Monster Dragreder to take part in the bloody Rider War as the titular Rider of Kamen Rider Ryuki (仮面ライダー龍騎, Kamen Raidā Ryūki) in 2002. After focusing on saving lives rather than eliminating the other participant Riders and dying while doing so, the Rider War was averted; allowing Shinji and the other participants to live normal lives again with no memory of the battle.

During the events of Heisei Generations Forever, a past iteration of Kamen Rider Ryuki joined forces with the other Heisei Kamen Riders to combat Tid's forces.

While he had already lost his powers as Ryuki, Shinji developed a fear of mirrors after secretly blaming the readers of ORE Journal for his former workplace's disbandment. This unintentionally causes his evil Mirror World counterpart, Ryuga, to resurface in the real world as an Another Rider version of himself. While Another Ryuga stalked him and killed anyone close to him, Shinji spent the rest of his life as a recluse in his own apartment and seals off all reflective surfaces. In 2019, he attempted to commit suicide, believing it was the only way to prevent the Another Rider from hurting anyone else, but this was foiled when he was found by the Time Riders and hospitalized. After accepting his Mirror World counterpart, Shinji reconciles with his former employer, Okubo.

Following this, during the events of the mini-series Rider Time: Kamen Rider Ryuki, Shinji and his mirror counterpart are dragged into a second Rider War, this time set up by the dying Sara. Ryuga tried to take Shinji's body for his own once more, but former ally of Shinji's, Tezuka, regained his memories and successfully warned Shinji and his allies. After becoming the winner of the second Rider War, Shinji regains his memories of the original Rider War and learns from Sara that her boyfriend, Tatsuya, was turned into an Another Rider and coerced into becoming the pawn of Odin, one of Shinji's enemies from the original Rider War. He helps redeem Tatsuya before Sara uses the last of her will to bring Shinji back to the real world, but Odin brainwashes the youth and forces him to attack. Sougo and Geiz arrive in time to defeat the Another Rider and Odin before Shinji entrusts them with the Ryuki and Knight Ride Watches. On behalf of his fallen friend from the original Rider War, Ren, Shinji watches over the former's wife, Eri.

- Year 2068: Dragreder fell under the thrall of Ohma Zi-O, controlled by the Ryuki Ride Watch, and forced to support him in his dictatorship.

Takamasa Suga (須賀 貴匡, Suga Takamasa) reprises his role as Shinji Kido.

=== Mirror Shinji ===
Originally hailing from an alternate continuity depicted in Kamen Rider Ryuki: Episode Final, "Mirror Shinji" (鏡像の 真司, Kyōzō no Shinji) is an evil Mirror counterpart of Shinji who was created by a lonely Yui Kanzaki in Shinji's image after she met him as a child and was seemingly abandoned by him. As a being from the Mirror World, Mirror Shinji participated in the Rider War as Kamen Rider Ryuga (仮面ライダーリュウガ, Kamen Raidā Ryūga) to survive in the real world indefinitely by taking Shinji's body as his own. However, Yui succumbs to her illness, allowing Shinji to purge his doppelganger and destroy him.

In the original reality, Mirror Shinji was Shinji's literal reflection who represented the darker aspects of his personality, such as his animosity towards ORE Journal's readers. Taking Tsukasa's alternate dimension theory to heart, the Time Jacker Heure manages to summon Mirror Shinji by shattering a mirror one thousand times and transforms him into an Another Rider version of his original Rider form, Another Ryuga (アナザーリュウガ, Anazā Ryūga). With his newly acquired power, Ryuga hunted down ORE Journal readers before he was defeated by Kamen Rider Zi-O II. Following this, Shinji accepted his mirror counterpart as part of himself and regained him.

However, Mirror Shinji refused to accept this and during the events of Rider Time: Kamen Rider Ryuki, participated in the second Rider War to get revenge. While manipulating Tezuka into betraying Shibaura, he inadvertently helps the former, Ren, and Shinji regain their memories of the original Rider War before possessing Shinji once more to make him fight his allies. Despite his best efforts, the real Shinji emerged victorious as the mirror twin was suppressed and all of the other Riders were killed; allowing Shinji to return to the real world.

As Another Ryuga, Mirror Shinji gains the ability to enter and survive in the human world indefinitely and wields twisted versions of his original Rider weapons. He can also reflect incoming attacks back to their opponents two-fold. As a result of being the original version of his Another Rider form and a Mirror World inhabitant, the Time Riders discovered it was nearly impossible to acquire his corresponding Ride Watch. Despite this, Sougo was able to defeat him as Kamen Rider Zi-O II.

As with the real Shinji Kido, Mirror Shinji is also reprised by Takamasa Suga.

=== Daisuke Okubo ===
Also returning from Kamen Rider Ryuki, Daisuke Okubo (大久保 大介, Ōkubo Daisuke) is the chief editor and one of Shinji's seniors at the ORE Journal until it was shut down due to the rise of social media. Sougo encountered Okubo, who told him about Shinji while the former was investigating the mysterious deaths of ORE Journal readers. After Shinji accepted his mirror counterpart as a part of himself, he reconciles with Okubo as they moved on from their former workplace's disbandment.

Kanji Tsuda (津田 寛治, Tsuda Kanji) reprises his role as Daisuke Okubo.

=== Ren Akiyama ===
Also returning from Kamen Rider Ryuki, Ren Akiyama (秋山 蓮, Akiyama Ren) is a cold loner who fought in the original Rider War as Kamen Rider Knight (仮面ライダーナイト, Kamen Raidā Naito) to save his fiancée, Eri Ogawa, from a coma. Even though he won, its orchestrator, Shiro Kanzaki, reversed the Rider War's events so it never happened and gave the participant Riders peaceful lives. As a result, Ren became a full-time employee at the coffee shop Atori (花鶏) while Eri was revived from her coma.

During the events of Rider Time: Kamen Rider Ryuki, Ren married Eri, but was drafted into the second Rider War, which gradually caused his memories of the original Rider War to return. Near the end of the battle, he was forced to fight Shinji, who had become possessed by his Mirror World twin, and was severely wounded while protecting him from Asakura's assault. Once Shinji was freed, Ren asked him to look after Eri before dying.

Satoshi Matsuda (松田 悟志, Matsuda Satoshi) reprises his role as Ren Akiyama. (Note: The Rider Time Ryuki sequel was conceived when Matsuda expressed his wish to return in Zi-O on Twitter, which caught the attention of several fans overnight. Geiz's similarity to a younger Ren is acknowledged by the producers Takebe and Shirakura, who referenced this during the special's final part, with Shinji mistaking Geiz for his fallen friend.)

=== Miyuki Tezuka ===
Also returning from Kamen Rider Ryuki, Miyuki Tezuka (手塚 海之, Tezuka Miyuki) is a fortune teller who fought in the original Rider War as Kamen Rider Raia (仮面ライダーライア, Kamen Raidā Raia) to get revenge on Takeshi Asakura, who had injured his pianist friend, only to be killed while doing so. When the Rider War's events were averted, Tezuka was revived and returned to his original life.

During the events of Rider Time: Kamen Rider Ryuki, Tezuka was drafted into the second Rider War and seemingly joined Shinji's team to combat Shibaura's team before he revealed his allegiance with the latter. However, once he regained his memories of the original Rider War and learned of Mirror Shinji's involvement, he was able to warn the real Shinji before he is killed by Shibaura.

Hassei Takano (高野 八誠, Takano Hassei) reprises his role as Miyuki Tezuka.

=== Jun Shibaura ===
Also returning from Kamen Rider Ryuki, Jun Shibaura (芝浦 淳, Shibaura Jun) is an arrogant, manipulative, well-versed computer programmer who fought in the original Rider War as Kamen Rider Gai (仮面ライダーガイ, Kamen Raidā Gai) before he was betrayed and killed by Asakura. When the Rider War's events were averted, Shibaura is revived off-screen.

During the events of Rider Time: Kamen Rider Ryuki, Shibaura becomes the leader of his own group consisting of Ishibashi, Totsuka, and Tezuka. Despite not having his memories of the original Rider War, Shibaura retains his manipulative nature as he convinces Tezuka to betray Shinji's team before Tezuka's original memories returned. After Shibaura kills Tezuka, Ryuga possesses Shinji's body and kills him in turn.

Satoshi Ichijo (一條 俊, Ichijō Satoshi) reprises his role as Jun Shibaura.

=== Takeshi Asakura ===
Also returning from Kamen Rider Ryuki, Takeshi Asakura (浅倉 威, Asakura Takeshi) is a foul-tempered and sadistic criminal who fought in the original Rider War as Kamen Rider Ouja (仮面ライダー王蛇, Kamen Raidā Ōja). Unlike the other Riders, who died as a result of the Rider War, Asakura met his end after he was cornered by the police and gunned down. When the Rider War's events were averted, Asakura is revived, but retained his sadism and memories.

During the events of Rider Time: Kamen Rider Ryuki, Asakura was drafted into a new Rider War. This time, he shows more contempt while fighting his old foes. Asakura temporarily finds company in the amnesiac Goro while hunting Shinji and Ren, but he kills Goro and makes an attempt on Ren's life before suffering severe injuries in the resulting fight and dying as a result of them.

Takashi Hagino (萩野 崇, Hagino Takashi) reprises his role as Takeshi Asakura.

=== Kamen Rider Odin ===
Also returning from Kamen Rider Ryuki, Kamen Rider Odin (仮面ライダーオーディン, Kamen Raidā Ōdin) is a mysterious entity who participated in the original Rider War on Shiro's behalf by possessing humans. As such, he could not be killed. After Odin and Ren became the last two Riders standing and engaged each other in battle, the former vanished after Shiro's sister Yui died; making Ren the winner by default.

During the events of Rider Time: Kamen Rider Ryuki, Odin returned and possessed an unnamed hooded man to restart the Rider War after convincing Tatsuya he could save Sara; turning him into the Another Rider, Another Ryuki, in order to carry out Shiro's original command to revive Yui. To further his plot, he also gave Tatsuya a soul gem so he can collect his defeated opponents' souls and use them to ostensibly revive Sara. Once his pawn realized he was hurting Sara more than he was helping her, Odin brainwashes him and sends him into a berserker state. However, Zi-O defeated and rescued Tatsuya. In the real world, Odin made himself known and used all three Survive cards to grant himself immortality until Zi-O and Geiz used the Ryuki and Knight Ride Watches to cancel this ability. With one Survive card left, Odin was defeated once and for all.

Tsuyoshi Koyama (小山 剛志, Koyama Tsuyoshi) reprises his voice role as Kamen Rider Odin.

=== Goro Yura ===
Also returning from Kamen Rider Ryuki, Goro Yura (由良 吾郎, Yura Gorō) is the loyal servant of the super-lawyer Shuichi Kitaoka, who fought in the original Rider War as Kamen Rider Zolda (仮面ライダーゾルダ, Kamen Raidā Zoruda). Due to his boss being diagnosed with cancer, Goro took his place in the battle and ended up being killed by Kitaoka's rival, Asakura. When the Rider War was averted, Goro and Kitaoka were revived.

During the events of Rider Time: Kamen Rider Ryuki, Goro was drafted into the second Rider War as Kamen Rider Zolda since Kitaoka had died by this time. Per his late boss' final wish, Goro at first feigned loyalty to Asakura before eventually attacking him once he got the opportunity. However, he died from injuries sustained during the resulting fight.

Tomohisa Yuge (弓削 智久, Yuge Tomohisa) reprises his role as Goro Yura.

== Kamen Rider Agito ==
=== Shoichi Tsugami ===
Shoichi Tsugami (津上 翔一, Tsugami Shōichi), born Tetsuya Sawaki (沢木 哲也, Sawaki Tetsuya), is a young man who suffered amnesia as a result of the Akatsuki Incident and assumed the name of his brother in-law before being adopted by the Misugi family. After being targeted by the monstrous Lords for possessing an Agito's Seed in 2001, Shoichi became the titular Rider of Kamen Rider Agito (仮面ライダーアギト, Kamen Raidā Agito) to defeat them before going on to open a restaurant named after the fallen Agito's Seed victims.

During the events of Heisei Generations Forever, Shoichi joined forces with the Heisei Kamen Riders to combat Tid's forces.

In 2019, Shoichi was in France for a cooking demonstration before returning to Tokyo to aid SAUL, the G3 army, and the Time Riders in stopping an Another Agito army. However, the Time Jackers planned for this so they could steal Shoichi's powers and strengthen their lead Another Agito. After Tsukuyomi rediscovers her chronokinetic powers and helps Shoichi regain his Rider powers, he helps Zi-O Trinity defeat the lead Another Agito before relinquishing his powers and entrusting his Ride Watch to the Time Riders so he can live a normal life.

Toshiki Kashu (賀集 利樹, Kashū Toshiki) reprises his role as Shoichi Tsugami.

=== Another Agito ===
Also returning from Kamen Rider Agito, Another Agito (アナザーアギト, Anazā Agito) is a flawed version of Kamen Rider Agito and the original Another Rider. In the original timeline, the original Another Agito was Kaoru Kino (木野 薫, Kino Kaoru), a surgeon who also survived the Akatsuki Incident, but became megalomaniacal and killed those who inherited Agito's Seeds before learning the error of his ways. He would later give his life to help Agito and Kamen Rider Gills destroy the Lord, Ericius Liquor.

In 2019, the Time Jackers created a new Another Agito to infect civilians and convert them into a zombie-like army to lure out Shoichi and steal his powers so they can empower their lead Another Agito. However, Tsukuyomi rediscovers her chronokinetic powers and helps Shoichi regain his Rider powers so he can assist Zi-O Trinity in defeating the Another Agito leader and cure its victims.

The lead Another Agito is capable of implanting corrupted Agito's Seeds into people's bodies by biting them, which will transform them into copies of itself, and wields a twisted version of Agito's Shining Caliber (シャイニングカリバー, Shainingu Karibā) naginata. After being strengthened by Shoichi's powers, it gained the ability to create more Another Agitos at a time by firing a purple beam from its chest and gains twisted versions of Agito's Flame Saber (フレイムセイバー, Fureimu Seibā) and Storm Halberd (ストームハルバード, Sutōmu Harubādo). While individual Another Agitos can be changed back, destroying the leader is the only way to do so permanently.

=== Kamen Rider G3 ===
Also returning from Kamen Rider Agito, Kamen Rider G3 (仮面ライダーG3, Kamen Raidā Jī Surī) is a series of powered suits developed by the Squad of Anti-Unidentified Lifeforms (SAUL) branch of Tokyo's Metropolitan Police Department (MPD) in 2001. A weaker mass produced version, Kamen Rider G3 Mild (仮面ライダーG3マイルド, Kamen Raidā Jī Surī Mairudo), was also developed, but was rendered defunct after its first fight.

In 2019, the original G3 suit was mass-produced before an army of operators were deployed to assist Shoichi and the Time Riders in combating the Time Jackers' Another Agito army, with Shoichi himself wearing one such suit while he was depowered.

=== Takahiro Omuro ===
Also returning from Kamen Rider Agito, Takahiro Omuro (尾室 隆弘, Omuro Takahiro) is a member of the SAUL branch of the MPD and the driver for Kamen Rider G3's mobile command RV, G-Mobile. He was also an operator of a G3-Mild suit until it was rendered defunct following its first use. After the Lords were defeated, Omuro went on to lead the G5 Unit squad.

In 2019, Takahiro and his new SAUL team began testing a mass-produced version of the original G3 suit before the Time Jackers and their version of Another Agito attack SAUL to lure the real Agito back to Japan.

Akiyoshi Shibata (柴田 明良, Shibata Akiyoshi) reprises his role as Takahiro Omuro.

=== Mana Kazaya ===
Also returning from Kamen Rider Agito, Mana Kazaya (風谷 真魚, Kazaya Mana) is the daughter of Nobuyuki Kazaya and niece of Yoshihiko Misugi who inherited an Agito's Seed like Shoichi and gained psychic powers.

Rina Akiyama (秋山 莉奈, Akiyama Rina) reprises her role as Mana Kazaya.

=== Kamen Rider G4 ===
Returning from Kamen Rider Agito: Project G4, Kamen Rider G4 (仮面ライダーG4, Kamen Raidā Jī Fō), a.k.a. Shiro Mizuki (水城 史朗, Mizuki Shirō), was the second lieutenant of the Japan Ground Self-Defense Force's GA Division who used the G4 System exo-suit before he was killed in battle. The suit's A.I. nearly took on a life of its own, but it was destroyed as well.

Swartz used Another World to summon an alternate reality version of Kamen Rider G4 to help him achieve his goals before the latter was destroyed by Kamen Rider Woz.

Instead of being reprised by Ryo Karato (唐渡 亮, Karato Ryō), Kamen Rider G4 appears in a non-speaking role.

== Kamen Rider Kuuga ==
=== Kamen Rider Kuuga ===
Kamen Rider Kuuga (仮面ライダークウガ, Kamen Raidā Kūga), a.k.a. Yusuke Godai (五代 雄介, Godai Yusuke), is a 24-year-old, multi-talented adventurer.

During the events of Heisei Generations Forever and Over Quartzer, Kamen Rider Kuuga joins forces with the Heisei Kamen Riders to combat Tid and the Quartzers respectively.

Instead of being reprised by Joe Odagiri (オダギリ ジョー, Odagiri Jō), Kamen Rider Kuuga appears in non-speaking roles.

=== Ancient Warrior ===
The Ancient Warrior (古代の戦士, Kodai no Senshi) is the original Kamen Rider Kuuga who defended the Linto Tribe, humanity's ancestors, from the Grongi Tribe before he sealed the monsters within his coffin in the Kurougatake ruins until the seal was undone in the year 2000. The Ancient Warrior was killed by the incomplete N·Daguva·Zeba, but the former's belt bonded to Yusuke, who takes the warrior's place as Kuuga to stop the revived Grongi from slaughtering humanity.

During the events of Heisei Generations Forever, Tid invaded the Kurougatake ruins the day before Yusuke became Kuuga and used the Ancient Warrior's remains to create the Kuuga Another Watch. Unbeknownst to the Time Jacker however, Geiz managed to absorb the hero's essence into the Kuuga Ride Watch before the tomb collapsed.

=== Kamen Rider Kuuga (Manga) ===
The 2014 manga version of Yusuke Godai is a youth who was chosen by the Ancient Warrior's mummified remains to succeed him as Kuuga in the modern era after the Grongi escaped.

During the events of Kamen Rider Zi-O the Movie: Over Quartzer, this version of Kuuga was summoned from a discarded manga as part of the Heisei Kamen Riders' reinforcements against the Quartzers' Kasshine army.

=== N·Daguva·Zeba ===
Returning from Kamen Rider Kuuga, N·Daguva·Zeba (ン･ダグバ･ゼバ, N Daguba Zeba) is the leader of the Grongi and the "harbinger of ultimate darkness" (究極の闇をもたらす者, Kyūkyoku no Yami o Motarasu Mono).

An alternate reality version of N·Daguva·Zeba was brought to Sougo's world following the Kuuga Ride Watch's destruction. Assisting Another Decade in his plot to destroy the Kamen Rider multiverse, Daguva defeated Grand Zi-O before he was killed by Ohma Zi-O.

Instead of being reprised by Kenji Urai (浦井 健治, Urai Kenji), N·Daguva·Zeba appears in a non-speaking role.

== Kamen Rider Blade ==
=== Kazuma Kenzaki ===
Kazuma Kenzaki (剣崎 一真, Kenzaki Kazuma) is the titular Rider of Kamen Rider Blade (仮面ライダーブレイド, Kamen Raidā Bureido) and an agent of B.O.A.R.D. who specialized in keeping the Undeads sealed in 2004. After he was exposed to Undead cells and Hajime, a.k.a. the Joker, became the winner of the Battle Fight, Kazuma was forced to sacrifice his humanity and become another Joker to save the world from mass extinction and exiled himself to avoid another conflict with Hajime.

Through a combination of Another Blade being created in 2019 instead of 2004 and his Undead status, Kazuma was able to retain his Rider powers, which he used to confront Hajime after spending years in hiding, believing he was still using his powers after all of the sacrifices he made for him. When Another Blade absorbed Kazuma and Hajime's Undead cells, the former regained his humanity and the latter became completely human, before Zi-O Trinity defeats the Another Rider and prevents the mass destruction caused by her becoming a Joker. Following this, Kazuma and Hajime entrusted their Ride Watches to the Time Riders.

Takayuki Tsubaki (椿 隆之, Tsubaki Takayuki) reprises his role as Kazuma Kenzaki.

=== Hajime Aikawa ===
Also returning from Kamen Rider Blade, Hajime Aikawa (相川 始, Aikawa Hajime), a.k.a. the original Joker (ジョーカー, Jōkā), is the most feared of the Undead as his victory in the Battle Fight would mark the end of all life on Earth. After sealing the Mantis Undead Chalice and the Human Undead to conceal his true nature, Joker took on their personality traits and assumed the identity of "Hajime Aikawa" to make amends with a photographer named Kurihara, who was killed during one of his skirmishes with the recently freed Undead as Kamen Rider Chalice (仮面ライダーカリス, Kamen Raidā Karisu). During his battles, Hajime also befriended Kurihara's daughter, Amane, who helped him accept humanity. After all of the Undead are sealed, Hajime's true identity is revealed and he loses control over his powers before learning Kazuma had turned himself into another Joker to force the current Battle Fight into a stalemate. Knowing they would be forced to fight each other, Kazuma exiled himself so Hajime can live happily with Kurihara's family.

Due to a combination of his status as a Joker and Another Blade being created in 2019 instead of 2004, Hajime retained his powers. However, while attempting to save Amane from Sougo after she was turned into Another Blade, he is attacked by Kazuma, who considered Hajime's actions an apparent betrayal of his trust. When Amane is forcibly turned into Another Blade again, she rendered Hajime completely human by extracting and absorbing his Undead cells. Following Another Blade's defeat, Hajime is able to fulfill his dream of living with humanity after entrusting his Ride Watch to the Time Riders.

Ryoji Morimoto (森本 亮治, Morimoto Ryōji) reprises his role as Hajime Aikawa.

=== Amane Kurihara ===
Also returning from Kamen Rider Blade, Amane Kurihara (栗原 天音, Kurihara Amane), is the daughter of Haruka Kurihara, an ally of Kazuma and Hajime's. Despite being a troublemaker, she is also the inspiration behind Hajime's new way of life and his living alongside humans.

In 2019, Amane becomes a worker at her mother's Jacaranda Cafe. However, White Woz forcibly turns her into the Another Rider, Another Blade (アナザーブレイド, Anazā Bureido). This forces a conflict between Kazuma, Hajime, and the Time Riders over safely turning her back to normal. She was later forced by White Woz to transform into Another Blade again and absorb Kazuma and Hajime's Undead cells, rendering them humans and summoning the Battle Fight's overseer, the Stone of Sealing, to commence a mass-extinction event as the result of her becoming a Joker. However, Zi-O Trinity saves Amane and eradicates the Joker cells, ending the Battle Fight for good.

As Another Blade, she can fire a beam of lightning from her chest and wields a twisted version of Blade's Blay Rouzer (ブレイラウザー, Burei Rauzā) sword.

Hikari Kajiwara (梶原 ひかり, Kajiwara Hikari) reprises her role as Amane Kurihara.

=== Darkroaches ===
Darkroaches (ダークローチ, Dākurōchi) are cockroach-like Undead grunts that serve as extensions of the Stone of Sealing that manifested once Hajime became the sole remaining Undead in the Battle Fight in 2004. After Kenzaki became another Joker however, the Darkroaches vanished since the Battle Fight was put into a stalemate.

The Darkroaches return in 2019 when Another Blade absorbed Kazuma and Hajime's Joker essence into herself and became a Joker, appearing from the Stone of Sealing in the Joker's form before they were permanently destroyed after Zi-O Trinity defeated Another Blade.

== Kamen Rider Hibiki ==
=== Kamen Rider Hibiki ===
Kamen Rider Hibiki (仮面ライダー響鬼, Kamen Raidā Hibiki), a.k.a. Hitoshi Hidaka (日高仁志, Hidaka Hitoshi) or simply Hibiki (ヒビキ), is a seasoned Oni of the Takeshi organization with a strong sense of ethics and believes in constantly training oneself to keep up their strength. At some point between 2006 and 2019, Hidaka retired from being an Oni and passed the mantle of "Hibiki" to his apprentice and successor, Kyosuke.

During the events of Heisei Generations Forever and Over Quartzer, a past version of Hibiki joined forces with the Heisei Kamen Riders to combat Tid and the Quartzers' forces respectively.

Instead of being reprised by Shigeki Hosokawa (細川 茂樹, Hosokawa Shigeki), Kamen Rider Hibiki appears in non-speaking roles in both films.

=== Kyosuke Kiriya ===
Returning from Kamen Rider Hibiki, Kyosuke Kiriya (桐矢 京介, Kiriya Kyōsuke) was originally a high school student and apprentice to Hitoshi Hidaka in 2005 before becoming a full-fledged Oni a year later.

After Kyosuke graduated from high school, he became the successor of the Hibiki mantle when Hidaka retired, but he retained his first Oni Rider form as he never truly surpassed him. Despite this, Kyosuke took on Sougo's childhood friend, Tsutomu Tsuzumiya, as his disciple. After the Time Jackers turned Tsutomu into Another Hibiki in 2019 however, Kyosuke becomes conflicted over fighting his student. Feeling responsible for never officially taking on the Hibiki mantle, Kyosuke eventually accepts it and activates the Hibiki Ride Watch, which he uses to rescue Tsutomu with help from Zi-O Trinity. After reconciling with his apprentice, Kyosuke entrusts the Ride Watch to Sougo.

Yūichi Nakamura reprises his role as Kyosuke Kiriya, as well as the time traveler Yuto Sakurai.

=== Todoroki ===
Also returning from Kamen Rider Hibiki, Todoroki (トドロキ), a.k.a. Tomizo Todayama (戸田山 登巳蔵, Todayama Tomizō), was originally an Oni Rider apprentice to Zanki (ザンキ) prior to his master's death. Instead of becoming the next Zanki however, he chose to make a name for himself as Kamen Rider Todoroki (仮面ライダー轟鬼, Kamen Raidā Todoroki).

In 2019, he came into conflict with Another Hibiki and fights alongside Kyosuke and the Time Riders to stop him. Once he learns the Another Rider was Kyosuke's disciple, he blames his fellow Oni for not taking on the mantle of Hibiki properly and pushing said disciple away. Once Kyosuke accepts his responsibilities and rescues his apprentice with Zi-O Trinity's help, Todoroki makes amends with Kyosuke and leaves peacefully.

Shingo Kawaguchi (川口 真五, Kawaguchi Shingo) reprises his role as Todoroki.

== Kamen Rider Kiva ==
=== Kamen Rider Kiva ===
Kamen Rider Kiva (仮面ライダーキバ, Kamen Raidā Kiba), a.k.a. Wataru Kurenai (紅 渡, Kurenai Wataru), is the honest and shy half-Fangire son of the human Otoya Kurenai and the Fangire Queen Maya as well as the younger half-brother of Taiga Nobori.

During the events of Heisei Generations Forever and Over Quartzer, Kamen Rider Kiva joins forces with the Heisei Kamen Riders to combat Tid and the Quartzers' forces respectively.

Instead of being reprised by Koji Seto (瀬戸 康史, Seto Kōji), Kamen Rider Kiva appears in non-speaking roles in both films.

=== Jiro ===
Returning from Kamen Rider Kiva, Jiro (次狼, Jirō) is an Arms Monster and the last of the werewolf-like Wolfen race who became one of Kamen Rider Kiva's wards and gained the ability to transform into the Garulu Saber (ガルルセイバー, Garuru Seibā) so Kiva can assume his Garulu Form.

In 2019, Jiro and the Arms Monsters are forced to serve under Another Kiva. However, noticing her pain, he secretly aided Sougo and his allies in saving her from herself. He also privately gave Sougo the Kiva Ride Watch on Wataru's behalf before taking his leave to prevent Another Kiva from controlling him again.

Kenji Matsuda (松田 賢二, Matsuda Kenji) reprises his role as Jiro.

=== Basshaa and Dogga ===
Also returning from Kamen Rider Kiva, Basshaa (バッシャー, Basshā) and Dogga (ドッガ) are Arms Monsters and the last members of the Gill-man-like Merman Race and the Frankenstein's monster-like Franken Race respectively. Like Jiro, they also became Kamen Rider Kiva's wards and gained the ability to transform into the Basshaa Magnum (バッシャーマグナム, Basshā Magunamu) and Dogga Hammer (ドッガハンマー, Dogga Hanmā) respectively so the Rider can assume new forms.

In 2019, the Arms Monsters fell under the thrall of Another Kiva and were forced to support her in combat. However, Jiro was able to break free and seek out Sougo's help in defeating Another Kiva.

Instead of being reprised by Yuuki Ogoe (小越 勇輝, Ogoe Yūki) and Eiji Takigawa (滝川 英治, Takigawa Eiji), Basshaa and Dogga respectively appear in non-speaking roles.

=== Kamen Rider Rey ===
Returning from Kamen Rider Kiva: King of the Castle in the Demon World, Kamen Rider Rey (仮面ライダーレイ, Kamen Raidā Rei), a.k.a. Takato Shiramine (白峰 天斗, Shiramine Takato), was a monster hunter affiliated with the monstrous Legendorga demon race who pretended to aid Wataru in stopping them before revealing his true colors and being defeated by his former colleague turned the present-day Kamen Rider IXA, Keisuke Nago (名護 啓介, Nago Keisuke).

In an alternate reality, Shiramine succeeded in his plans before he was summoned to Another World by Swartz to help him achieve his goals, only to be destroyed by Kamen Rider Geiz.

Instead of being reprised by Shouma Yamamoto (山本 匠馬, Yamamoto Shōma), Kamen Rider Rey appears in a non-speaking role.

== Kamen Rider Kabuto ==
=== Kamen Rider Kabuto ===
Kamen Rider Kabuto (仮面ライダーカブト, Kamen Raidā Kabuto), a.k.a. Souji Tendou (天道 総司, Tendō Sōji), is a seemingly arrogant yet compassionate young man who possesses the Kabuto Zecter (カブトゼクター, Kabuto Zekutā), which he acquired from an alternate future version of himself during the events of the film Kamen Rider Kabuto: God Speed Love.

During the events of Heisei Generations Forever and Over Quartzer, a past version of Kamen Rider Kabuto joined forces with the Heisei Kamen Riders to combat Tid and the Quartzers' forces respectively.

Instead of being reprised by Hiro Mizushima (水嶋 ヒロ, Mizushima Hiro), Souji Tendou is portrayed by an unidentified stand-in.

=== Arata Kagami ===
Returning from Kamen Rider Kabuto, Arata Kagami (加賀美 新, Kagami Arata) is the son of ZECT's original leader Riku. He temporarily became Kamen Rider TheBee after TheBee Zecter abandoned Yaguruma, but he later discarded the Zecter out of guilt and was chosen by the Gatack Zecter to become Kamen Rider Gatack (仮面ライダーガタック, Kamen Raidā Gatakku).

When a string of Worm meteorite crashes occur in 2019, Kagami began to hunt the re-emerging Worms while being opposed by Yaguruma. Receiving assistance from Sougo and his friends, Kagami realizes only he remembers the Worms as both ZECT and the Shibuya incident had been wiped from public knowledge due to time distortions. While helping the Time Riders as Gatack, Kagami is accepted by the Kabuto Zecter and becomes Kamen Rider Kabuto on Tendou's behalf to stop Yaguruma from interfering in the Time Riders' task of destroying the Worms' meteor. Once it is destroyed, the Kabuto Zecter transforms into the Kabuto Ride Watch, which Kagami entrusts to Sougo.

Yuuki Sato (佐藤 祐基, Satō Yūki) reprises his role as Arata Kagami.

=== Sou Yaguruma ===
Also returning from Kamen Rider Kabuto, Sou Yaguruma (矢車 想, Yaguruma Sō) is a former agent of ZECT who operated as Kamen Rider TheBee (仮面ライダーザビー, Kamen Raidā ZaBī) before he was fired, leading him to become Kamen Rider KickHopper (仮面ライダーキックホッパー, Kamen Raidā Kikku Hoppā) and develop a morbid ideology in the process.

In 2019, Yaguruma aligns himself with the Worms and forces Heure to turn him into Another Kabuto (アナザーカブト, Anazā Kabuto) so he can hunt down Zi-O and prevent his interference in the Worms' plan to take over the world, leading the Time Jacker to temporarily align himself with the Time Riders and Kagami to stop the Another Rider. Yaguruma was eventually defeated by Kagami as Kamen Rider Kabuto while Zi-O Trinity destroyed the Worms' meteorite.

Like the ZECT Riders, Another Kabuto can utilize the Clock Up (クロックアップ, Kurokku Appu) ability to move at the speed of light. As he became an Another Rider in 2019 instead of 2006, Yaguruma retains his ability to become KickHopper since his transformation into Another Kabuto did not alter the ZECT Riders' timeline.

Hidenori Tokuyama (徳山 秀典, Tokuyama Hidenori) reprises his role as Sou Yaguruma.

=== Shun Kageyama ===
Also returning from Kamen Rider Kabuto, Shun Kageyama (影山 瞬, Kageyama Shun) was originally Yaguruma's subordinate within ZECT's Shadow troops before he became the new Kamen Rider TheBee and fired Yaguruma, only to be fired himself and develop a nihilistic outlook on life. He would later join his former commanding officer as his partner, Kamen Rider PunchHopper (仮面ライダーパンチホッパー, Kamen Raidā Panchi Hoppā), before inadvertently buying a bracelet that slowly mutate him into a Worm and begged Yaguruma to kill him.

When the Worms return to Earth in 2019, one of them mimics the late Kageyama's form and gains his PunchHopper powers while supporting Yaguruma after he transformed into Another Kabuto. However, the Kageyama Worm later ceased to exist after Zi-O Trinity obliterated the meteor containing his kin.

As with the original Kageyama, this Worm is also portrayed by Masato Uchiyama (内山 眞人, Uchiyama Masato).

=== Worms ===
Also returning from Kamen Rider Kabuto, the Worms (ワーム, Wāmu) are a race of insectoid aliens capable of mimicking a human's appearance and memories to blend in with their society before killing the template to maintain their cover. They previously attempted to invade Earth in 2006, only to be thwarted by the ZECT Riders.

In 2019, the Worms return to Earth through fragments of a giant meteor. One particular member disguised itself as the late Shun Kageyama to win Sou Yaguruma over to their cause. Additionally, due to a space-time disruption, knowledge of the original Shibuya Meteorite incident and ZECT's existence were erased, with only the majority of surviving ZECT Riders like Kagami and especially Yaguruma remembering them. After Kagami becomes Kabuto to defeat Yaguruma, the meteor is destroyed by Zi-O Trinity; with all of the Worms derived from it ceasing to exist.

== Kamen Rider Drive ==
=== Kamen Rider Drive ===
Kamen Rider Drive (仮面ライダードライブ, Kamen Raidā Doraibu), a.k.a. Shinnosuke Tomari (泊 進ノ介, Tomari Shinnosuke), is a young man who joined the Metropolitan Police's Special Investigations Division to fight the Roidmudes and solve the mystery behind the death of his father, Eisuke Tomari.

During the events of Heisei Generations Forever and Over Quartzer, Kamen Rider Drive joins forces with the Heisei Kamen Riders to combat Tid and the Quartzers' forces respectively.

Instead of being reprised by Ryoma Takeuchi (竹内 涼真, Takeuchi Ryōma), Kamen Rider Drive appears in non-speaking roles in both films.

=== Krim Steinbelt ===
Returning from Kamen Rider Drive, Krim Steinbelt (クリム・スタインベルト, Kurimu Sutainberuto) was a scientist who developed the Core Driviars, a technology which was used to empower the Drive System. Though he was killed by his traitorous partner, Tenjuro Banno, Steinbelt was able to convert himself into an A.I. and place it in what would become the Drive Driver and eventually became Shinnosuke's partner, who nicknamed him Mr. Belt (ベルトさん, Beruto-san).

During the events of Heisei Generations Forever, Mr. Belt supported Drive as they joined the Heisei Riders in saving civilians from Tid's forces. In Kamen Rider Zi-O the Movie: Over Quartzer, Krim utilized a solid hologram of his original body to ask for Sougo's help in protecting his 16th-century ancestor, Clara Steinbelt, from the Quartzers and ensuring Drive's existence. Once he accomplished their job, Krim handed Sougo his own version of the Drive Ride Watch. After obtaining the power of Ohma Form, Zi-O summoned the Heisei Riders to his aid, including Drive with Krim as the Drive Driver once more.

Chris Peppler (クリス・ペプラー, Kurisu Pepurā) reprises his role as Krim Steinbelt.

=== Go Shijima ===
Also returning from Kamen Rider Drive, Go Shijima (詩島 剛, Shijima Gō) is a freelance photographer and son of Tenjuro Banno who can transform into Kamen Rider Mach (仮面ライダーマッハ, Kamen Raidā Mahha).

In Kamen Rider Zi-O the Movie: Over Quartzer, Go aids Sougo in his trip to the Sengoku period to save Krim's ancestor and to ensure Drive's existence. Although Go lost his powers and memories as a Kamen Rider after he relinquished his Ride Watch, he regained them at the height of Sougo and Geiz's rebellion against the Quartzers.

Yu Inaba (稲葉 友, Inaba Yū) reprises his role as Go Shijima.

=== Kamen Rider Brain ===
Also returning from Kamen Rider Drive, the Brain Roidmude (ブレンロイミュード, Buren Roimyūdo), or Brain (ブレン, Buren) for short, was a Bat-Type Roidmude and one of 108 Roidmude units who became Kamen Rider Brain (仮面ライダーブレン, Kamen Raidā Buren) in the web series Drive Saga: Kamen Rider Brain.

In Kamen Rider Zi-O the Movie: Over Quartzer, Kamen Rider Brain appeared as part of the Heisei Kamen Riders' reinforcements who stood against the Quartzers' Kasshine army.

Instead of being reprised by Shota Matsushima (松島 庄汰, Matsushima Shōta), Kamen Rider Brain appears in a non-speaking role.

=== Paradox ===
Returning from Kamen Rider Drive: Surprise Future, the Paradox Roidmude (パラドクスロイミュード, Paradokusu Roimyūdo), or Paradox (パラドクス, Paradokusu) for short, was initially the Spider-Type Roidmude 108 and servant of Banno who was sealed away for his unruly behavior. He broke free in 2035, defeated Shinnosuke's future son, Eiji Tomari, and assumed his identity to become Kamen Rider Dark Drive (仮面ライダーダークドライブ, Kamen Raidā Dāku Doraibu) so he could travel back to 2015 and absorb his past self to evolve himself and create a global dystopia before he is destroyed by Shinnosuke.

In an alternate reality, Paradox succeeded in his goal before being summoned to Another World by Swartz in order to become the Another Rider Another Drive (アナザードライブ, Anazā Doraibu). Paradox was tasked with eliminating Heure and Ora, mimicking the latter's appearance to instill confusion amongst them and the Time Riders. After Ora killed Heure to ensure her own survival, the Roidmude is destroyed by Grand Zi-O.

As Another Drive, Paradox can summon the Another Tridoron (アナザートライドロン, Anazā Toraidoron) car, launch a flaming tire projectile, shoot energy beams from a twisted version of Drive's Door-Ju (ドア銃, Doa Jū; Door Gun) mounted on his left arm, and retains his Roidmude abilities of mimicry and production of a Heavy Acceleration (重加速, Jūkasoku) field.

Instead of being reprised by Rikiya Koyama (小山 力也, Koyama Rikiya), Paradox is voiced by Ayaka Konno (紺野 彩夏, Kon'no Ayaka), who also portrays the Roidmude's disguise as Ora.

=== Chase ===
Also returning from Kamen Rider Drive, Chase (チェイス, Cheisu) is a Roidmude prototype who was originally Krim Steinbelt's assistant Roidmude 000, dubbed Proto Zero (プロトゼロ, Puroto Zero), who copied traffic police officer Koichi Kano's (狩野 洸一, Kano Kōichi) appearance. He served as Steinbelt's partner in combating the rogue Roidmudes as Kamen Rider Proto Drive (仮面ライダープロトドライブ, Kamen Raidā Puroto Doraibu) before he was reprogrammed into the monsters' enforcer Mashin Chaser (魔進チェイサー, Mashin Cheisā). He eventually regained his original memories and joined Steinbelt, Shinnosuke, and Go as Kamen Rider Chaser (仮面ライダーチェイサー, Kamen Raidā Cheisā) to combat the Roidmudes once more before giving his life to defeat Banno.

In an alternate timeline, Chase remained on the Roidmudes' side and defeated Drive before he came to Sougo's world after the Drive Ride Watch was destroyed. He joined Swartz in enacting his plans for destroying the Kamen Rider multiverse and led an army of monsters before he absorbed Geiz's memories of his original timeline self. As a result, Chase switched sides and aided the Time Riders before he was killed by Swartz as Another Decade.

Taiko Katono (上遠野 太洸, Katōno Taikō) reprises his role as Chase.

== Kamen Norider ==
=== Takeshi Kinashi ===
Takeshi Kinashi (木梨 猛, Kinashi Takeshi), a.k.a. Kamen Norider (仮面ノリダー, Kamen Noridā), is a parody character based on the original Kamen Rider created by comedy duo Tunnels for a 1980s skit. While they did so without Toei's permission, the latter went on to register Kamen Norider's trademark in 2013.

In Over Quartzer, Takeshi is reimagined as a cyborg who failed to become a Heisei Rider, but dedicated his life to fighting evil regardless. Imprisoned by the Quartzers prior to the events of the movie, Takeshi became Sougo's cellmate and encouraged the boy to continue being a hero after he learned his life was a lie. Although Tsukuyomi and Go freed Sougo after the fact, Takeshi remained imprisoned and watched Zi-O's victory over Kamen Rider Barlckxs from his cell.

Noritake Kinashi (木梨 憲武, Kinashi Noritake) reprises his role as Takeshi Kinashi.
