= List of Kamen Rider Build characters =

The main heroes of Kamen Rider Build. From left to right: Ryuga Banjo, Sento Kiryu, Kazumi Sawatari, and Gentoku Himuro.

The four heroic Riders of Kamen Rider Build transformed.

Kamen Rider Build (仮面ライダービルド, Kamen Raidā Birudo) is a Japanese tokusatsu series that serves as the 28th installment in the Kamen Rider franchise and the 19th entry in the Heisei era.

== Main characters ==
=== Sento Kiryu ===
Sento Kiryu (桐生 戦兎, Kiryū Sento) is a genius physicist with amnesia, with his only memory being Night Rogue performing experiments on him, who was found by Soichi Isurugi and offered shelter at Nascita. It is later revealed that his true identity was Takumi Katsuragi, whose memory was erased and face swapped with a musician named Taro Satou (佐藤 太郎, Satō Tarō) after a failed assassination attempt on Evolto. After learning of his true identity, there are times where Sento and Takumi's personalities swap places, but the latter eventually chooses to disappear so Sento can defeat Evolto. After the final battle, he is teleported to the "new world", which is actually the main Kamen Rider universe, where he is sometimes mistaken for this world's version of Taro Satou, whom he becomes a fan of as revealed in Kamen Rider Zi-O.

Sento transforms into Kamen Rider Build by utilizing the Build Driver (ビルドドライバー, Birudo Doraibā) belt to combine the essence contained within a pair of Fullbottles (フルボトル, Furubotoru), which allow him to access several forms. Certain combinations work better than others, with optimal combinations known as a Best Match (ベストマッチ, Besuto Matchi) and mismatches known as a Trial Form (トライアルフォーム, Toraiaru Fōmu). His default Best Match is Rabbit Tank Form (ラビットタンクフォーム, Rabitto Tanku Fōmu), which grants increased leg strength, via the Rabbit (ラビット, Rabitto) and Tank (タンク, Tanku) Fullbottles. While transformed, he wields the Drill Crusher (ドリルクラッシャー, Doriru Kurasshā), which can switch between Blade Mode (ブレードモード, Burēdo Mōdo) and Gun Mode (ガンモード, Gan Mōdo). His personal vehicle is the Machine Builder (マシンビルダー, Mashin Birudā) motorcycle, which is summoned by using the Lion (ライオン, Raion) Fullbottle in conjunction with the Build Phone (ビルドフォン, Birudo Fon). Alongside his numerous Best Matches and Trial Forms, Sento develops several power-up forms, including:

- Rabbit Tank Sparkling Form (ラビットタンクスパークリンフォーム, Rabitto Tanku Supākuringu Fōmu): An upgraded version of Rabbit Tank Form accessed from the drink can-like Rabbit Tank Sparkling (ラビットタンクスパークリン, Rabitto Tanku Supākuringu) device that grants the ability to summon any of Sento's preexisting forms' weapons. In this form, he is equipped with a pair of forearm-mounted Sparkling Blades (スパークリングブレード, Supākuringu Burēdo).
- Hazard Form (ハザードフォーム, Hazādo Fōmu): Sento's super form accessed by combining the Build Driver and the Hazard Trigger (ハザードトリガー, Hazādo Torigā) adapter while using any Best Match combination in conjunction with the former that allows him to increase the capabilities of the corresponding form into a Super Best Match (スーパーベストマッチ, Supā Besuto Matchi) at the risk of losing control. He later creates the Full Full Rabbit Tank Bottle (フルフルラビットタンクボトル, Furu Furu Rabitto Tanku Botoru) to stabilize the Hazard Trigger and evolve this form into one of two stronger versions. In both of this form's evolutions, he wields the Fullbottle Buster (フルボトルバスター, Furubotoru Basutā), which can switch between Buster Blade Mode (バスターブレードモード, Basutā Burēdo Mōdo) and Buster Cannon Mode (バスターキャノンモード, Basutā Kyanon Mōdo).
  - Rabbit Rabbit Form (ラビットラビットォーム, Rabitto Rabbito Fōmu): A red-colored evolution of Hazard Form accessed from the Full Full Rabbit Tank Bottle's Rabbit Mode (ラビットモード, Rabitto Mōdo) that grants superhuman speed.
  - Tank Tank Form (タンクトタンクフォーム, Tanku Tanku Fōmu): A blue-colored evolution of Hazard Form accessed from the Full Full Rabbit Tank Bottle's Tank Mode (タンクモード, Tanku Mōdo) that grants superhuman strength.
- Genius Form (ジーニアスフォーム, Jīniasu Fōmu): Sento's final form accessed from the Genius (ジーニアス, Jīniasu) Fullbottle that grants the combined powers of all 60 original Fullbottles.
- Cross-Z Build Form (クローズビルドフォーム, Kurōzu Birudo Fōmu): A fusion form between Kamen Riders Build and Cross-Z accessed from the Cross-Z Build Can (クローズビルド缶, Kurōzu Birudo Kan) device that grants the use of the Best Match Rabbit (ベストマッチラビット, Besuto Matchi Rabitto) support robot and the Best Match Dragon (ベストマッチドラゴン, Besuto Matchi Doragon) energy construct for combat assistance. This form first appears in the film Kamen Rider Build the Movie: Be the One.

Sento Kiryu is portrayed by Atsuhiro Inukai (犬飼 貴丈, Inukai Atsuhiro).

=== Ryuga Banjo ===
Ryuga Banjo (万丈 龍我, Banjō Ryūga) is a 23-year-old former professional fighter from Yokohama. Prior to his birth, a portion of Evolto's essence fused with him in a failed attempt to possess his mother Yuri Banjo (万丈 優里, Banjō Yuri). As a result, Ryuga was born after only two months of gestation, and spent much of his childhood being tested on by Namba Industries. After Takumi Katsuragi learned of Ryuga's true nature, he attempted to lure him into his apartment and kill him and Evolto, but the plan backfired when Evolto erased Takumi's memories and killed Taro Satou, with Ryuga being framed for the murder. After escaping prison, he was taken in by Sento Kiryu. His girlfriend was turned into a Smash and killed in front of him, with the resulting essence purified into the Dragon (ドラゴン, Doragon) Fullbottle, which was given to him. After the final battle, Ryuga is teleported to the "new world" where he encounters his alternate self off-screen before finally reuniting with Sento.

Ryuga receives the robotic Cross-Z Dragon (クローズドラゴン, Kurōzu Doragon) adapter from Sento as a companion. He is also given a copy of the Build Driver, which he can combine with the Cross-Z Dragon while utilizing the Dragon Fullbottle in conjunction with the latter to transform into Kamen Rider Cross-Z (仮面ライダークローズ, Kamen Raidā Kurōzu). While transformed, he gains pyrokinesis. He also wields the Beat Closer (ビートクローザー, Bīto Kurōzā) sword. Unlike Build, Cross-Z cannot mix and match Fullbottles, as the Cross-Z Dragon only has one slot, but he compensates by being physically stronger. Over the course of the series, Ryuga acquires several evolutions of his Rider form, including:

- Kamen Rider Cross-Z Charge (仮面ライダークローズチャージ, Kamen Raidā Kurōzu Chāji): An upgrade form accessed from the Dragon Sclashjelly in conjunction with the Sclash Driver that grants similar capabilities as Kamen Rider Grease. While transformed, Ryuga wields the Twin Breaker.
- Kamen Rider Cross-Z Magma (仮面ライダークローズマグマ, Kamen Raidā Kurōzu Maguma): Ryuga's final form accessed by combining the Build Driver and the Cross-Z Magma Knuckle (クローズマグマナックル, Kurōzu Maguma Nakkuru) while using the Cross-Z Magma (クローズマグマ, Kurōzu Maguma) Fullbottle, which is created from the Dragon Sclashjelly, in conjunction with the latter that grants geo-thermokinesis and a pair of Celestial Pyro Wings (ソレスタルパイロウィング, Soresutaru Pairo Uingu). If necessary, he can wield the Cross-Z Magma Knuckle in battle.
- Kamen Rider Great Cross-Z (仮面ライダーグレートクローズ, Kamen Raidā Gurēto Kurōzu): Ryuga's super form accessed by combining the Build Driver and an upgraded version of the Cross-Z Dragon called the Great Cross-Z Dragon (グレートクローズドラゴン, Gurēto Kurōzu Doragon) while using the Great Dragon (グレートドラゴン, Gurēto Doragon) Evolbottle, which is created from the Dragon Evolbottle, in conjunction with the latter that increases the pyrokinetic abilities of his default form.
- Kamen Rider Cross-Z Evol (仮面ライダークローズエボル, Kamen Raidā Kurōzu Eboru): A fusion form between Kamen Riders Cross-Z and Evol accessed from the Muscle Galaxy (マッスルギャラクシー, Massuru Gyarakushī) Fullbottle that allows the former to use the latter's powers. This form appears exclusively in the V-Cinema Build New World: Kamen Rider Cross-Z.

Ryuga Banjo is portrayed by Eiji Akaso (赤楚 衛二, Akaso Eiji).

=== Misora Isurugi ===
Misora Isurugi (石動 美空, Isurugi Misora) is Soichi's 19-year-old daughter, who works as Sento's assistant in purifying Fullbottles. She gained her powers after being exposed to the Pandora Box (パンドラボックス, Pandora Bokkusu) and spending seven years in a coma. As well, she played a role in Project Build, as Evolto used Soichi's memories of her drawings of organic and inorganic-based objects to influence Shinobu into developing the Best Match system. Faust kidnapped her for experimentation, but Soichi rescued her a year prior to the series' events. She remained hidden in Nascita while using her online idol identity Miitan (みーたん, Mītan) to gather intel and money from her fanbase.

Misora possesses the ability to purify and enhance Nebula Gas, which made her a target of Faust. Initially, using the ability put her to sleep for a week, but Sento later developed a machine to mitigate this. During the invasion by Seito, the western part of Japan, Misora's Martian bracelet is revealed to house the spirit of the Martian Vernage and is the source of her power.

The new world version of Misora regains the memories of her alternate self when the Pandora Box is reconstructed during Killbus' invasion and accepts Kazumi's proposal during the events of Downfall's attack.

Misora Isurugi is portrayed by Kaho Takada (高田 夏帆, Takada Kaho). As a child, Misora is portrayed by Noel Moriyama (森山 のえる, Moriyama Noeru).

== Recurring characters ==
=== Sawa Takigawa ===
Sawa Takigawa (滝川 紗羽, Takigawa Sawa) is a 27-year-old freelance journalist who assists Sento after learning of his true identity as Kamen Rider Build. She is later revealed to be a spy for Namba Heavy Industries, using her position to investigate the cover-up of an industrial accident she believes killed her father. She is actually a brainwashed Namba agent, with her motivating drive about her father being a fabrication. She was supposed to let herself die after failing Namba's mission, but the familial bonds she made with Sento and the others gave her a reason to live and influenced her decision to cut ties with Namba.

The new world version of Sawa regains the memories of her alternate self when the Pandora Box is reconstructed during Killbus' invasion and later enters a relationship with Gentoku.

Sawa Takigawa is portrayed by Yukari Taki (滝 裕可里, Taki Yukari).

=== Nascita ===
Several characters gather at Nascita, a café owned by Soichi Isurugi which he lives at with his daughter Misora.

==== Soichi Isurugi ====
Soichi Isurugi (石動 惣一, Isurugi Sōichi) is the enigmatic 48-year-old owner of Nascita and Misora's father, who is secretly a high-ranking member of Faust. Ten years prior to the series' events, he was the astronaut who discovered the Evol-Driver and the Pandora Box on Mars. This resulted in the alien entity Evolto possessing him and using him to commit numerous atrocities, including the Skywall Disaster. Soichi's personality occasionally resurfaces to briefly fight Evolto before being suppressed. Soichi was tricked into thinking that Evolto would leave his body upon retrieving the Evol-Driver, and ended up in a coma while Evolto possessed Ryuga and then Sento before creating his own body in Soichi's image.

While possessed by Evolto, Soichi utilizes the Cobra (コブラ, Kobura) Fullbottle in conjunction with the Transteam Gun (トランスチームガン, Toransuchīmu Gan) to transform into Blood Stalk (ブラッドスターク, Buraddo Sutāku). While transformed, he wields the Steam Blade (スチームブレード, Suchīmu Burēdo) dagger, which can combine with the Transteam Gun to form the Steam Rifle (スチームライフル, Suchīmu Raifuru).

Soichi Isurugi is portrayed by Yasuyuki Maekawa (前川 泰之, Maekawa Yasuyuki).

=== Sawatari Farm ===
Sawatari Farm (猿渡ファーム, Sawatari Fāmu) is the Sawatari family's potato farm. It is located in Hokuto, the northern region of Japan isolated by the Skywall Disaster.

==== Kazumi Sawatari ====
Kazumi Sawatari (猿渡 一海, Sawatari Kazumi) is a 29-year-old soldier from Hokuto and the current owner of his farm. In hopes of obtaining financial support, he volunteered for Hokuto's military and underwent human experimentation by Faust. He first infiltrates Touto during the events of the crossover film Kamen Rider Heisei Generations Final: Build & Ex-Aid with Legend Rider to reclaim the Phoenix (フェニックス, Fenikkusu) and Robot (ロボット, Robotto) Fullbottles for Hokuto. He is later deployed to lead the Hokuto army to invade Touto, and after Seito's invasion of Hokuto, he joins forces with those from Nascita in hopes of reclaiming his country.

Utilizing the Robot Sclashjelly (スクラッシュゼリー, Sukurasshuzerī) stand-up pouch in conjunction with the Sclash Driver (スクラッシュドライバー, Sukurasshu Doraibā) belt, Kazumi can transform into Kamen Rider Grease (仮面ライダーグリス, Kamen Raidā Gurisu). While transformed, he wields the Twin Breaker (ツインブレイカー, Tsuin Bureikā), which can switch between its raygun-like Beam Mode (ビームモード, Bīmu Mōdo) and its dagger-like Attack Mode (アタックモード, Attaku Mōdo). He can also use the Dragon Sclashjelly to produce a second Twin Breaker for dual wielding.

During his final confrontation with Evolto, Kazumi receives the Grease Blizzard Knuckle (グリスブリザードナックル, Gurisu Burizādo Nakkuru) from Sento, who warns him to only use said device as a weapon, as transforming with it would kill him due to a recent overdose of Nebula Gas damaging his body. However, he ignores the warning as he combines a copy of the Build Driver and the Grease Blizzard Knuckle while using the North Blizzard (ノースブリザード, Nōsu Burizādo) Fullbottle in conjunction with the latter to transform into his final form, Kamen Rider Grease Blizzard (仮面ライダーグリスブリザード, Kamen Raidā Gurisu Burizādo), resulting in his death once the fight is over.

The new world version of Kazumi regains the memories of his alternate self when the Pandora Box is reconstructed and becomes Kamen Rider Grease once again. Unlike his original counterpart, he is able to become Grease Blizzard without the risk of death. After the events involving Downfall, Kazumi enters a relationship with Misora. During the events of the V-Cinema Build New World: Kamen Rider Grease, he obtains the Grease Perfect Kingdom (グリスパーフェクトキングダム, Gurisu Pāfekuto Kingudamu) device, which he can combine with the Build Driver while using the Grease (グリスパー, Gurisu) Fullbottle in conjunction with the former to transform into Kamen Rider Grease Perfect Kingdom (仮面ライダーグリスパーフェクトキングダム, Kamen Raidā Gurisu Pāfekuto Kingudamu).

Kazumi Sawatari is portrayed by Kouhei Takeda (武田 航平, Takeda Kōhei).

==== Hokuto Three Crows ====
The Hokuto Three Crows (北都三羽ガラス, Hokuto Sanba Garasu) are a trio of Hokuto soldiers who were originally workers of the Sawatari farm who enlisted to repay a debt to their former employer. Using Shinobu Katsuragi's Lost Fullbottles, they are each able to transform into an enhanced form of the Smash known as Hard Smash (ハードスマッシュ, Hādo Sumasshu) and later the stronger Hazard Smash (ハザードスマッシュ, Hazādo Sumasshu). After Sento and Ryuga are transported to the new world, the Hokuto Three Crows regain the memories of their alternate selves and their ability to transform while fighting alongside Grease against Downfall.

===== Akaba =====
Akaba (赤羽), real name Masaru Ooyama (大山 勝, Ōyama Masaru), uses the Castle (キャッスル, Kyassuru) Fullbottle to transform into the Castle Hard Smash (キャッスルハードスマッシュ, Kyassuru Hādo Sumasshu). He seems to possess a violent streak, as he attacks civilians without hesitation, but is loyal to Kazumi and follows his decisions even when he questions them. When Seito invades Touto to steal the Pandora Box, Akaba sacrifices himself to protect it from Gentoku, but ultimately fails to prevent its theft.

Akaba is portrayed by Eishin (栄信).

===== Aoba =====
Aoba (青羽), real name Syuuya Aikawa (相河 修也, Aikawa Shūya), uses the Kuwagata (クワガタ; Stag beetle) Fullbottle to transform into the stag beetle-themed Stag Hard Smash (スタッグハードスマッシュ, Sutaggu Hādo Sumasshu). Despite his looks and mannerisms, he is one of the kinder members of the Three Crows. He is killed in battle when Build goes on a rampage and uses the Hazard Finish against him.

Aoba is portrayed by Tateto Serizawa (芹澤 興人, Serizawa Tateto).

===== Kiba =====
Kiba (黄羽), real name Syoukichi Mihara (三原 聖吉, Mihara Shōkichi), uses the Fukurou (フクロウ, Fukurō; Owl) Fullbottle to transform into the Owl Hard Smash (オウルハードスマッシュ, Ōru Hādo Sumasshu). He behaves childishly, but after Aoba's death, he becomes bitter and violent in combat. While trying to defend his homeland from Seito's invasion, he becomes the Washio Brothers' hostage to force Kazumi into serving Seito, and is killed protecting him.

Kiba is portrayed by Takuya Yoshimura (吉村 卓也, Yoshimura Takuya).

=== Faust ===
Faust (ファウスト, Fausuto) is a mysterious terrorist organization that experiments on humans to create the Smash creatures. It was founded by Touto scientists Takumi Katsuragi and Gentoku Himuro. According to Gentoku, Faust's objectives are to achieve Takumi's goals of evolving humanity into the "ultimate lifeform". The organization was compromised by Evolto and Namba who sought to reassemble the Pandora Box and repeat the calamity that destroyed the ancient Martian civilization.

==== Gentoku Himuro ====
Gentoku Himuro (氷室 幻徳, Himuro Gentoku) is the 35-year-old special advisor to his father, Prime Minister Taizan Himuro, and head of the Touto Institute of Advanced Matter Physics (東都先端物質学研究所, Touto Sendan Busshitsukakui Kenkyūsho). He was once a eccentric but kind-hearted patriot, but his personality was altered after the Skywall Disaster and he became a sadistic and power-hungry maniac, performing questionable acts to ensure Touto's safety after deeming his father's pacifism a liability. He orchestrated Takumi's expulsion from the Touto Institute while unknowingly being manipulated by Soichi Isurugi. After taking his late friend's position as the prime minister's advisor, Gentoku took the mantle of Night Rogue (ナイトローグ, Naito Rōgu) and declared leadership over Faust.

During his time as a special advisor, Gentoku manipulates events to achieve his goal of militarizing Touto. After his identity is exposed, he goes into exile and seeks refuge with Namba Industries, becoming Kamen Rider Rogue (仮面ライダーローグ, Kamen Raidā Rōgu) via the Crocodile Crack (クロコダイルクラック, Kurokodairu Kurakku) Fullbottle in conjunction with the Sclash Driver. His true nature begins emerging as the Pandora Box's corruption starts wearing off through his increased exposure to Nebula Gas. Witnessing his father's death finally restores Gentoku's original personality, and he joins forces with Sento to battle Evolto. He also obtains the Prime Rogue (プライムローグ, Puraimu Rōgu) Fullbottle, which he uses in conjunction with a Build Driver to transform into his final form; Kamen Rider Prime Rogue (仮面ライダープライムローグ, Kamen Raidā Puraimu Rōgu). In the final battle, Gentoku sacrifices himself to critically wound Evolto and enable him to be defeated.

The new world version of Gentoku regains the memories of his alternate self when the Pandora Box is reconstructed and becomes Kamen Rider Rogue once again. He also begins dating the new world version of Sawa, who shares his eccentric fashion sense.

Gentoku Himuro is portrayed by Kensei Mikami (水上 剣星, Mikami Kensei).

==== Evolto ====
Evolto (エボルト, Eboruto) is the true antagonist of the series and the cruel, genocidal, and sociopathic leader of the Blood Tribe and Faust. He excels at manipulating others, but can be taken off guard when his plans do not go as planned. He is also able to feel human emotions as a result of using multiple host bodies and being exposed to Build. Prior to the series' events, he stole the Pandora Box and escaped from his brother Killbus, who was using the Box to destroy his home planet. After the destruction of his planet, he used the power of the Pandora Box to destroy planets to absorb their energy and gain power. After he destroyed the Martian civilization, he was rendered incorporeal and lost his true physical form before Vernage sealed him and his damaged Evol-Trigger (エボルトリガー, Eboru Torigā) adapter within the Pandora Box.

Utilizing a pair of Evol-Bottles (エボルボトル, Eboru Botoru), including the Rider (ライダー, Raidā) Evol-Bottle, in conjunction with the Evol-Driver (エボルドライバー, Eboru Doraibā) belt, Evolto can transform into Kamen Rider Evol (仮面ライダーエボル, Kamen Raidā Eboru). While transformed, he gains the use of high-speed movements that are matched only by Build's Genius Form. Each of his forms are treated as an evolution of his Phases (フェーズ, Fēzu), which are as follows:

- Cobra Form (コブラフォーム, Kobura Fōmu): Evolto's default form accessed from the Cobra and Rider Evol-Bottles that is also known as "Phase 1" (フェーズ1, Fēzu Wan).
- Dragon Form (ドラゴンフォーム, Doragon Fōmu): An auxiliary form accessed from the Dragon and Rider Evol-Bottles that is also known as "Phase 2" (フェーズ2, Fēzu Tsū). In this form, Evolto wields the Beat Crosser.
- Rabbit Form (ラビットフォーム, Rabitto Fōmu): An auxiliary form accessed from the Rabbit and Rider Evol-Bottles that is also known as "Phase 3" (フェーズ3, Fēzu Surī). In this form, Evolto wields the Drill Crusher.
- Black Hole Form (ブラックホールフォーム, Burakku Hōru Fōmu): Evolto's final form accessed by combining the Evol-Driver and Evol-Trigger while using the Cobra and Rider Evol-Bottles in conjunction with the former that is also known as "Phase 4: Perfection" (フェーズ4・完全体, Fēzu Fō Kanzen-tai).

During the events of the web series Kamen Rider Outsiders, a clone of Evolto utilizes the Evol-X (エボルエックス, Eboru Ekkusu) Fullbottle in conjunction with the Evol-Driver to transform into Kamen Rider Evol-X (仮面ライダーエボルX, Kamen Raidā Eboru Ekkusu).

Evolto is voiced by Tetsuo Kanao (金尾 哲夫, Kanao Tetsuo). While possessing Soichi Isurugi and later assuming his likeness, he is played by Yasuyuki Maekawa.

==== Guardians ====
The Guardians (ガーディアン, Gādian) are enforcement androids mass-produced by Namba Industries as peacekeepers of each country, though it is not initially known that they are supporting governments outside Touto. They also act as Faust sleeper agents awaiting activation by Blood Stalk.

They wield Safeguard Rifles (セーフガードライフル, Sēfugādo Raifuru) and ride motorcycles called Capital Roaders (キャピタルローダー, Kyapitaru Rōdā). Several of them can combine together to form a single giant robot equipped with multiple guns. Under Faust's servitude, the reprogrammed Guardians can act as suicide bombers.

=== Smash ===
The Smash (スマッシュ, Sumasshu) are monsters formed by humans injected with liquefied Nebula Gas (ネビュラガス, Nebyura Gasu) as part of Faust's experiments, with the subjects losing most of their memories. To revert a Smash back to a normal human, the Kamen Riders must defeat them and extract their essence into an empty Fullbottle. Faust agents are given their own Fullbottles to transform into their Smash forms, which are equipped with a self-destruct function. Silver-colored Smash are stronger versions achieved through exposure to Nebula Gas of higher Hazard Levels. The experiment's goal is to find a perfect candidate for the Build Driver, with the Smash transformations considered failures. Each victim is ranked by their tolerance of Nebula Gas, called Hazard Levels (ハザードレベル, Hazādo Reberu).

==== Clone Smash ====
The Clone Smash (クローンスマッシュ, Kurōn Sumasshu), unlike regular Smash, are created from pure Nebula Gas and attack until destroyed. Being enhanced versions of the Press, Stretch, Strong and Flying Smash Hazard, they are stronger and more durable because they cannot feel pain. The Clone Smash are later used as materials to power a Lost Fullbottle and enable its user's transformation into a Lost Smash.

==== Lost Smash ====
Lost Smash (ロストスマッシュ, Rosuto Sumasshu) are Smash breeds created by Evolto and Katsuragi as the final Smash evolution. The experiment includes a human victim being heavily dosed with Nebula Gas and transformed into the Lost Smash by absorbing a pair of nearby Clone Smash. They are naive and highly aggressive, and also bound to die upon defeat. The Genius Fullbottle of Kamen Rider Build has the ability to save these victims and remove traces of Nebula Gas.

=== Namba Heavy Industries ===
Namba Heavy Industries Ltd (難波重工, Nanba Jūkō) is a company established by Juzaburo Namba which provides financial support to Faust. Because of its influence, all three countries attempted to distance themselves from Namba, although the company has agents placed within the governments' infrastructures.

==== Juzaburo Namba ====
Juzaburo Namba (難波 重三郎, Nanba Jūzaburō) is the corrupt, power-hungry, and war-mongering chairman of Namba, who will do anything to attain his goals. He initially collaborates with Faust and Evolto to acquire the Build system for military applications, but has a secret agenda to use the Pandora Box's energy to create weapons of mass destruction. He also brainwashed children to act as his agents, including Sawa Takigawa. However, he is not completely cruel, as he is shown to be close to Nariaki Utsumi in flashbacks.

His ultimate goal is to use the power of the Pandora Box to reform Japan and the entire world and rule it in his image. However, Evolto exploited him for its own agenda. Namba then requests aid from the Kamen Riders to oppose Evolto, but they fail and Evolto kills Namba as he is begging for his life.

In the merged universe at the end of the series, an alternate Namba owns a metalworking factory known as Namba Machine Workshop (難波機械製作所, Nanba Kikai Seisakusho).

Juzaburo Namba is portrayed by Akira Hamada (浜田 晃, Hamada Akira), while Norimasa Fuke portrays his disguise as Masakuni Midō.

==== Namba Children ====
The Namba Children (難波チルドレン, Nanba Chirudoren) are scientists, soldiers and spies who were brainwashed by Juzaburo Namba from an early age. They are positioned as sleeper agents within Touto, Hokuto and Seito to gain information for Namba and acquire what he needs.

===== Nariaki Utsumi =====
Nariaki Utsumi (内海 成彰, Nariaki Utsumi) is the 28-year-old secretary of Himuro, who was formally a scientist at the Touto Institute. While seemingly an open-minded person, he is actually a callous sadist loyal to Faust. Despite his commitment to Faust, Gentoku and Namba Heavy Industries, he expresses regret over his life choices, even commenting to Sento about their similar predicaments. To conceal Faust's activities, he became a scapegoat by masquerading as Night Rogue. He attempts to commit suicide, but Sento stops him; however, he is gravely injured and converted into a cyborg by Evolto. Utsumi then returned to Namba as his spokesperson and developed the Rider Systems for Hokuto and Seito, gathering data on the Hazard Trigger while perfecting the Kaiser System.

Nariaki Utsumi is portrayed by Yuki Ochi (越智 友己, Ochi Yūki). As a child, Utsumi is portrayed by Yusei Ohtake (大竹 優青, Ōtake Yūsei).

===== Washio Brothers =====
The Washio Brothers (鷲尾兄弟, Washio Kyōdai) are a pair of siblings from Seito who serve alongside Gentoku as Seito's main troopers. The indoctrination and training they received transformed them into sadistic soldiers who use deception and dirty tricks to accomplish their tasks. They transform using the Kaiser System developed by Kaisei Mogami and Nariaki Utsumi, with a shared Nebula Steam Gun (ネビュラスチームガン, Nebyura Suchīmu Gan). Because of their limited supply in weaponry, the Nebulasteam Rifle can only be wielded by one of them at a time.

After Evolto declares war against Namba Heavy Industries, the Washio Brothers form an uneasy alliance with the Riders before dying. However, Evolto created copies of their Kaiser forms as guardians at the Pandora Tower. Utsumi reveals that he sabotaged the Kaiser Systems and programmed both Same and Bike Fullbottles as countermeasures, which Rogue and Mad Rogue use to destroy the copies.

====== Fu Washio ======
Fu Washio (鷲尾 風, Washio Fū) is Rai's older brother, who is the more level-headed of the two. He utilizes the Gear Remocon (ギアリモコン, Gia Rimokon) to transform into a turquoise-colored version of Kaiser known as Remocon Bros (リモコンブロス, Rimokon Burosu). He is the dominant user of the Nebula Steam Gun. He can also use his Gear Remocon and Rai's Gear Engine to transform into an upgraded version of Bi-Kaiser known as Hell Bros (ヘルブロス, Heru Burosu). He ultimately sacrifices himself to shield Cross-Z from a deathblow.

Fu Washio is portrayed by Osamu Adachi (足立 理, Adachi Osamu). As a child, Fu is portrayed by Shinta Takaiwa (高岩 芯泰, Takaiwa Shinta).

====== Rai Washio ======
Rai Washio (鷲尾 雷, Washio Rai) is Fu's younger brother, who is short-tempered, careless, and more violent in combat. He utilizes the Gear Engine (ギアエンジン, Gia Enjin) to transform into a white-colored version of Kaiser Reverse known as Engine Bros (エンジンブロス, Enjin Burosu). As Fu is the primary user of the Nebula Steam Gun, Rai wields the Steam Blade as his main weapon. Engine Bros is the most vulnerable of the pair, as it can be weakened with water-based attacks. During an alliance with the Riders against Evolto, Rai is the first to be killed after being caught in their former companion's black hole, giving his Gear Engine to Fu before his death.

Rai Washio is portrayed by Yuudai Nasuda (奈須田 雄大, Nasuda Yūdai). As a child, Rai is portrayed by Taiga Watanabe (渡辺 虎雅, Watanabe Taiga).

==== Hard Guardians ====
The Hard Guardians (ハードガーディアン, Hādo Gādian) are enhanced versions of the Guardians which Namba Heavy Industries mass-produced following Seito's declaration of war on Touto. When Namba Heavy Industries is disbanded, the remaining units are put under Evolto's control and serve as the front line of Pandora Tower's defense.

The Hard Guardians are equipped with a combat AI unit, a Gatling gun on their right arm, a clawed gauntlet on their left arm, and a pair of shoulder-mounted missile pods, with an improved drive module placed on each joint to enhance mobility. Their equipment can be replaced depending on the combat situation and can fight on equal terms against Rider System users.

=== Takumi Katsuragi ===
Takumi Katsuragi (葛城 巧, Katsuragi Takumi) is a 26-year-old man and the past identity of Sento Kiryu, infamously known among his peers as "The Devil's Scientist" (悪魔の科学者, Akuma no Kagakusha). During the Skywall Disaster, he was unaware of the full truth at the time and promised his father Shinobu that he would stop the Blood Tribe from destroying the Earth. During this time, he restarted Project Build (プロジェクトビルド, Purojekuto Birudo) and subjected himself to Nebula Gas to become Kamen Rider Build, but was banned for conducting unethical human experimentations with the Nebula Gas to evolve humanity.

During this period, Takumi assisted his former Touto colleague Kaisei Mogami in building the Enigma system to travel to another reality. While testing the performance of Kamen Rider Build in said world, he twice intervened in the confrontation between humans and Bugsters. Having accidentally killed Kamen Rider Genm prior, Build went on to extract Ex-Aid's samples into a single Fullbottle before foiling Mogami's intent to cause a convergence between the two realities.

Takumi Katsuragi is portrayed by Yukiaki Kiyama (木山 廉彬, Kiyama Yukiaki), and his cameo appearances as Build in Kamen Rider Ex-Aid were voiced by Atsuhiro Inukai.

=== Shinobu Katsuragi ===
Shinobu Katsuragi (葛城 忍, Katsuragi Shinobu) is Takumi's father and a member of the Kiwami Project, which saw Soichi Isurugi come into contact with the Pandora Box. Shinobu conducted illegal research on an infant Ryuga, and later led the conference of the Pandora Box's discovery when Evolto caused the Skywall Disaster. Soon after, his reputation was ruined as he was used as a scapegoat. He later faked his suicide after cryptically informing Takumi that Ryuga is essential to stopping Evolto and his kin, enlisting Reika Kine's aid in smuggling himself out of Touto.

Shinobu secretly aided Evolto for ten years by using his research in an attempt to repair the Evol-Driver before Takumi found and hid it. He also developed a man-made variant of Fullbottles called Lost Fullbottles (ロストフルボトル, Rosuto Furubotoru), also referred to as Lost Bottles (ロストボトル, Rosuto Botoru), which allow the user to transform into a Lost Smash but have heightened aggression and suggestibility. Shinobu resurfaces when Sento and his allies are searching for the Lost Fullbottles, revealing his alliance with Evolto while alienating Sento. However, his true plan was to pretend to be Evolto's ally while creating a specialized Best Match combination that could defeat him. He reveals his intentions to Sento when he thinks Evolto is defeated, but Evolto recovers. He fatally wounds Shinobu, but he lives long enough to give Sento his data to finalize the Cross-Z Build Form and apologize for hurting him. He comes back to life and like his son, he works as a scientist at the Japan Institute of Advanced Matter Physics in the new world. In Build New World: Kamen Rider Grease, he creates a copy of the Build Driver, which was owned by the Japanese government before being stolen by Downfall. After Downfall is defeated, he apologizes to Takumi for using him in the old world.

As the founder of the Rider System, Shinobu possesses his own copy of the Build Driver and a set of Fullbottles to transform into another Kamen Rider Build. While having access to Best Match forms, he is capable of outmaneuvering the strongest of his opponents in one-on-one fights, though struggles when fighting multiple opponents. He can also use another Fullbottle's power without transitioning, such as using the Phoenix Fullbottle as an escape while still in Rabbit Tank Form.

Shinobu Katsuragi is portrayed by Zyouzi Kokubo (小久保 丈二, Kokubo Jōji).

=== Prime ministers ===
==== Taizan Himuro ====
Taizan Himuro (氷室 泰山, Himuro Taizan) is the 67-year-old father of Gentoku and the prime minister of Touto (東都, Tōto), a pacifist state that possesses enough military strength for self-defense. Despite the rivalries between the states, Taizan wishes for Japan to reunite. Due to his poor health, he sent his son Gentoku to the unveiling of the Pandora Box, and retained his sanity as the only leader unaffected by its radiation. He suffered a heart attack during Faust's raid on a Touto facility, and entrusted Gentoku as acting prime minister, unaware that he is actually high-ranking Faust-member Night Rogue. As a result, the Touto government is compromised until Sento and Ryuga defeat Night Rogue and expose his identity to Taizan, who orders his son to be taken into custody. Soichi later poisons Taizan, and Gentoku regains emergency power to rule Touto. Taizan eventually recovers through Misora's power and exiles Gentoku while seeking to end the war with the least bloodshed. Despite his son's actions, he believes there is still good in him.

As Namba and Stalk enact their plan, Gentoku kidnaps Taizan so Stalk can force Sento into reviving the original Project Build. Gentoku works with the Kamen Riders against Evolto to save his father, but the plan backfires and Evolto transforms into Kamen Rider Evol. Taizan becomes Evolto's first victim after sacrificing his life to save Gentoku from him, allowing Gentoku to return to his true self.

Taizan Himuro is portrayed by Meikyo Yamada (山田 明郷, Yamada Meikyō).

==== Yoshiko Tajimi ====
Yoshiko Tajimi (多治見 喜子, Tajimi Yoshiko) is the 53-year-old prime minister of Hokuto (北都), a social welfare state which prioritizes the needs of its people. The Skywall Disaster rendered most of the farmland infertile and caused an economic collapse that forced many citizens to withdraw their children from school. Tajimi's personality was affected by radiation from the Pandora Box, and she secretly directed government funds from social welfare to the military. The machinations of Soichi, Namba and Gentoku cause war between the other two countries, who seek to take the Pandora Box by force, and she declares war on Touto. Her ruthless behavior during the invasion disgusts Kazumi, as he threatens her to stop targeting innocent civilians.

During Touto's fight against Hokuto, Tajimi acts on Soichi's advice to station her military on Touto's border to invade if Grease was defeated. But Tajimi realizes she had been manipulated into leaving her nation vulnerable to Seito, which invade and take her into custody. She is later brainwashed by Evolto and transformed into the Owl Lost Smash (オウルロストスマッシュ, Ōru Rosuto Sumasshu) before being defeated and freed by Kamen Rider Build's Genius Form. This purified her mind and caused her to be remorseful for her actions, leaving her as the only surviving prime minister.

Yoshiko Tajimi is portrayed by Ryoko Gi (魏 涼子, Gi Ryōko).

==== Masakuni Midō ====
Masakuni Midō (御堂 正邦, Midō Masakuni) is the 61-year-old prime minister of Seito (西都), which seeks economic recovery through technical advancement and has sent its young adults across the world to gather technical knowledge. Midō expresses interest in Tajimi's offer for alliance, but stands by while Hokuto and Touto weaken each other in warfare. When Hokuto loses to Touto, Midō sends Seito's military to invade Hokuto and capture Tajimi.

After losing the fight against Touto, Midō keeps his agreement with Touto while having a falling out with Namba. This results in Evolto killing him and having Namba assume his identity to use the country for Namba Heavy Industries' operations and his schemes. Evolto later poses as Midō during his endgame plan and places his kinsmen into governor positions.

Masakuni Midō is portrayed by Norimasa Fuke (冨家 規政, Fuke Norimasa).

=== Vernage ===
Vernage (ベルナージュ, Berunāju) is the former queen of Mars, who survived the destruction of her civilization at the cost of her physical form. While being a powerful entity, her life force is slowly diminishing. She managed to seal Evolto and his Evol-Trigger into the Pandora Box, while separating his Evol-Driver to prevent him from using it to free himself. When the artifacts are returned to Earth, her spirit is preserved in a bracelet which a young Misora found.

Vernage is voiced by Sora Amamiya (雨宮 天, Amamiya Sora).

== Guest characters ==
- Eita Kawai (河合 栄多, Kawai Eita): A Faust agent, Touto Institute researcher, and Katsuragi sympathizer. He uploaded data of the Pandora Box before the Faust army stole it. Blood Stalk transforms him into the Press Smash Hazard (プレススマッシュハザード, Puresu Sumasshu Hazādo) to fight Ryuga Banjo, but he is easily defeated. Stalk later reverts him to his human form, erasing his memories and altering his face to resemble Kuwata. Portrayed by Tsukasa Honjo (本庄 司, Honjō Tsukasa).
- Masahiro Nabeshima (鍋島 正弘, Nabeshima Masahiro): A Faust agent and prison guard who frames Ryuga Banjo for the death of Touto Institute researcher Takumi Katsuragi, then delivers Ryuga to Faust for experimentation. After luring Sento and Ryuga to Seito, he is converted into Mirage Smash as a "reward" and later into Square Smash as part of Blood Stalk's experiment. Although Build and Ryuga rescue him, the experiments erased most of his memories. Some time later, he regains his memories and revealed information about Faust to Sento, including Blood Stalk's identity. He and his family are later captured by Namba and used to force Sawa to betray her friends. Portrayed by Ichi Omiya (市 オオミヤ, Ichi Ōmiya).
- Kyōka Katsuragi (葛城 京香, Katsuragi Kyōka): Takumi's mother and Shinobu's wife, who was abducted from Hokuto and transformed by Faust into the first Strong Smash Hazard (ストロングスマッシュハザード, Sutorongu Sumasshu Hazādo). She was purified by Build, with the extracted element purified to create the Lock Fullbottle, before she entrusted the flash drive that contains the information of the Project Build to Sento. Portrayed by Hiro Komura (古村 比呂, Komura Hiro).
- Shingo Kuwata (桑田 真吾, Kuwata Shingo): A Faust agent, Touto Institute researcher, and Katsuragi sympathizer. He uses his Fullbottle to become a version of the Flying Smash. After Build defeats him, he reveals he was meant to lure Build away from Faust's raid to steal the Pandora Box. Before committing suicide, he reveals that Takumi had faked his death. Portrayed by Ryo Yoshida (吉田 亮, Yoshida Ryō).
- Masuzawa (増沢): One of the Namba Children and a spy who works as a secretary to the Touto prime minister. He was responsible for slipping a listening device into the Dragon Fullbottle to spy on Sento. After Sento exposes him, he kills himself using a Fullbottle to avoid capture. Portrayed by Taro Nakatani (中谷 太郎, Nakatani Tarō).

== Spin-off characters ==
=== Kaisei Mogami ===
Kaisei Mogami (最上 魁星, Mogami Kaisei) is the main antagonist of Kamen Rider Heisei Generations Final: Build & Ex-Aid with Legend Rider, who was a researcher in the Touto Institute and an associate of Takumi Katsuragi. Ten years ago, while researching parallel universes, he found the Bugster Virus at the Skywall and concluded it was from a parallel universe. He wanted to create the interdimensional gateway Enigma (エニグマ, Eniguma), but was unable to get funding, so he moved to Namba Heavy Industries to continue his research. With Takumi's help, he developed both the Kaiser System and the Enigma, allowing him to make contact with the prime universe version of himself, who is a Foundation X scientist. However, he lost the left side of his body due to an Enigma accident caused by Takumi, who opposed his ultimate goal, and became a cyborg. He resurfaces to cause the fusion and destruction of the two universes using the Enigma, and fuse with his counterpart to form a single immortal entity and become the ruler of all universes. The two Mogamis form an alliance and employ Foundation X's version of the Guardians, known as the X Guardians (Xガーディアン, Ekkusu Gādian), while creating the Nebula Bugster strain. Both Mogamis eventually fuse, but their plans are foiled and Ex-Aid and Build defeat them, with the latter fulfilling their scheme to merge their dimensions months later while defeating Evolto.

Mogami can transform into the blue-colored Kaiser (カイザー, Kaizā), while his counterpart transforms into the red-colored Kaiser Reverse (カイザーリバース, Kaizā Ribāsu). They can combine to form a single entity known as Bi-Kaiser (バイカイザー, Bai Kaizā). Utsumi acquires the Kaiser System blueprints after Mogami's death and perfects the technology, which he gives to Seito as the developed Hell Bros gear the Washio Brothers use.

Kaisei Mogami is portrayed by Kenji Ohtsuki (大槻 ケンヂ, Ōtsuki Kenji).

=== Blood Tribe ===
The Blood Tribe (ブラッド族, Buraddo-zoku) are a mysterious race of extraterrestrial origin who originated from Planet Blood (ブラッド星, Buraddo-sei) before their ruler Killbus destroyed it. Led by Killbus' younger brother Evolto, the four surviving Blood members caused the downfall of the Martian civilization and several other planets before possessing the four astronauts sent to explore Mars.

==== Kengo Inō ====
Kengo Inō (伊能 賢剛, Inō Kengo) is Evolto's second-in-command, who served as advisor to Seito Prime Minister Midō and influenced Sento meeting Ryuga. He becomes governor of Touto by the events of Kamen Rider Build the Movie: Be the One, after the Japanese civil war ends, and leads a mutiny against Evolto to carry out the Blood Tribe's initial plan to destroy Earth. He uses the Tokyo populace's anti-Kamen Rider sentiment to hypnotize them into hunting down Sento, with an infected Ryuga becoming his personal agent. Later on, he acquires the Hazard Trigger and gains the ability to transform into Kamen Rider Blood, later acquiring the Pandora Box. He then travels down to Earth's core to destroy it from the inside, but is destroyed by Kamen Rider Cross-Z Build.

Inō uses the Cobra Lost Fullbottle with Ryuga's Build Driver and Great Cross-Z Dragon combined with Sento's Hazard Trigger to transform into Kamen Rider Blood (仮面ライダーブラッド, Kamen Raidā Buraddo). The form initially required him to absorb nearby Blood Tribesmen, including Ryuga for possessing Evolto's essence, before Build extracts the absorbed targets from his body.

Kengo Inō is portrayed by Masanobu Katsumura (勝村 政信, Katsumura Masanobu).

==== Mitsuomi Gōbara ====
Mitsuomi Gōbara (郷原 光臣, Gōbara Mitsuomi) is a member of Blood Tribe and a former advisor to Hokuto Prime Minister Tajimi, having orchestrated Kasumi Ogura's conversion into a Smash, before becoming the new governor of Seito. He can transform into Zebra Lost Smash (ゼブラロストスマッシュ, Zebura Rosuto Sumasshu) using the Shimauma (シマウマ; Zebra) Lost Fullbottle. He is defeated by Kamen Rider Grease after initially defeating him in their first encounter.

Mitsuomi Gōbara is portrayed by Takashi Fujii (藤井 隆, Fujii Takashi).

==== Ryōka Saiga ====
Ryōka Saiga (才賀 涼香, Saiga Ryōka) is a member of Blood Tribe and a former aide to Touto Prime Minister Himuro before becoming the new governor of Hokuto. She can transform into Scissors Lost Smash (シザーズロストスマッシュ, Shizāzu Rosuto Sumasshu) using the Hasami (ハサミ; Scissors) Lost Fullbottle. She is defeated by Kamen Rider Rogue after initially defeating him in their second encounter.

Ryōka Saiga is portrayed by Rena Matsui (松井 玲奈, Matsui Rena).

==== Killbus ====
Killbus (キルバス, Kirubasu) is the older brother of Evolto and the antagonist of Build New World: Kamen Rider Cross-Z. He is a suicidal hedonist who ruled Planet Blood before destroying it as part of his plan to use the Pandora Box to destroy the entire universe and then himself. Taking on the form of a famous dancer named Satoshi Kakizaki after appearing from the Last Pandora Panel White (ラストパンドラパネルホワイト, Rasuto Pandora Paneru Howaito), Killbus hunts down Evolto within Ryuga to restore the Pandora Box and seeks to absorb Ryuga and Evolto into the white panel to obtain the energy to destroy the universe. He is later defeated by Ryuga in the Cross-Z Evol form.

Utilizing the Killbus Spider (キルバススパイダー, Kirubasu Supaidā) Fullbottle in conjunction with the Killbuspider (キルバスパイダー, Kirubasupaidā) adapter while combined with Sento's Build Driver, Killbus can transform into Kamen Rider Killbus (仮面ライダーキルバス, Kamen Raidā Kirubasu). He initially transformed into Build before adopting his personal Rider namesake.

Killbus is voiced by Anri Katsu (勝 杏里, Katsu Anri). While assuming the forms of Sento Kiryu and Satoshi Kakizaki, he is portrayed by Atsuhiro Inukai and Gaku Shindo, respectively.

=== Satoshi Kakizaki ===
Satoshi Kakizaki (柿崎 悟志, Kakizaki Satoshi) is a famous dancer whose form was copied by Killbus, leading the media to think that he had gone insane. After Killbus' death, his public image is restored.

Satoshi Kakizaki is portrayed by Gaku Shindo (進藤 学, Shindō Gaku).

=== Yui Mabuchi ===
Yui Mabuchi (馬渕 由衣, Mabuchi Yui) is a young elementary school teacher who is searching for Kamen Rider Cross-Z because she has faint memories of what happened before Sento merged the two worlds, when Faust captured her and she died as a result of their Lost Fullbottle experimentation. After Killbus unleashes the power of the Pandora Box, she regains the memories of her alternate self. She blames Ryuga and the other Kamen Riders for not saving her and her students, who are in comas as a result of being attacked by Faust's Guardians. After Killbus is defeated and her students recover with the power of the Genius Fullbottle, she forgives Ryuga and the others and helps him with the sale of Sento's experiments, starting a new relationship with him in the process.

Yui Mabuchi is portrayed by Mariya Nagao (永尾 まりや, Nagao Mariya).

=== Downfall ===
Downfall (ダウンフォール, Daunfōru) is an international radical terrorist organization that is the main antagonist of Build New World: Kamen Rider Grease, who aim to exploit the Rider System and achieve world domination. Its members are those who had been experimented on using the Nebula Gas and ex-Faust members from the old world. They hack Japan's Guardians and Hard Guardians to use as weapons.

Using man-made Metal Bottles (メタルボトル, Metaru Botoru), they can transform into green-colored battle forms known as Phantom Crushers (ファントムクラッシャー, Fantomu Kurasshā).

==== Keiji Uraga ====
Keiji Uraga (浦賀 啓示, Uraga Keiji) is the leader of Downfall, who is a mad scientist captivated by technological advancement and driven by war. Like Yui Mabuchi, he has burn marks and memories of the old world because he was a Lost Fullbottle test subject. He was originally one of Faust's scientists, who studied the Last Pandora Panel White alongside Shinobu Katsuragi and Evolto, but died as a result of their Lost Fullbottle experimentation. He is now determined to obtain the Last Pandora Panel White and dominate the new world as revenge on the old world, which did not acknowledge his scientific prowess. After finding the Phantom Liquid (ファントムリキッド, Fantomu Rikiddo), which is more powerful than Nebula Gas, he uses it to create the Phantom Crushers. He later takes Shinobu's Build Driver and Sento's Hazard Trigger to become his own Build, which he calls Kamen Rider Metal Build (仮面ライダーメタルビルド, Kamen Raidā Metaru Birudo), and fight the Sawatari farmers. He is later defeated by Kazumi in the Grease Perfect Kingdom form.

Kamen Rider Metal Build resembles Kamen Rider Build's Hazard Form, but with two black Tank-shaped eyes. Uraga transforms into Metal Build via a pair of Metal Tank (メタルタンク, Metaru Tanku) Fullbottles. Aside from retaining Build Hazard's abilities, his use of a similar Fullbottle pair negates the Hazard Trigger's side effects. After he is weakened by Grease Blizzard, Metal Build absorbs the Last Pandora Panel White and merges with a Phantom Crusher to assume his final form, Phantom Build (ファントムビルド, Fantomu Birudo), where he is clad in the Phantom Crusher's armor.

Keiji Uraga is portrayed by Tamiyasu Cho (趙 珉和, Chō Tamiyasu).

==== Simon Marcus ====
Simon Marcus (サイモン・マーカス, Saimon Mākasu) is a high-ranking official of the Alliance of Nations, who seeks to dominate the world in collaboration with Downfall. Like other Downfall members, he can transform into a Phantom Crusher. He is later shot dead by Uraga, who no longer needs him.

Simon Marcus is portrayed by Michael Tomioka (マイケル富岡, Maikeru Tomioka).
