= Kamen Rider Saber =

Japanese television drama

- Genre: Tokusatsu; Superhero fiction Dark fantasy action Supernatural fiction Portal fantasy Adventure; Drama
- Created by: Shotaro Ishinomori
- Written by: Takuro Fukuda
- Directed by: Takayuki Shibasaki
- Starring: Shuichiro Naito; Takaya Yamaguchi; Asuka Kawazu; Ryo Aoki; Yuki Ikushima; Eiji Togashi; Hiroaki Oka; Tomohiro Ichikawa; Mei Angela; Ken Shonozaki; Keisuke Sohma; Les Romanesques Tobi; Robin Furuya; Kyle Takano; Koji Saikawa; Hiroyuki Hirayama; Rina Chinen
- Voices of: Akio Ōtsuka; Kōki Uchiyama
- Opening theme: "ALMIGHTY ~Kamen no Yakusoku" by Tokyo Ska Paradise Orchestra feat. Yoohei Kawakami
- Ending theme: "Kamen Rider Saber" by Tokyo Ska Paradise Orchestra
- Composer: Kousuke Yamashita
- Country of origin: Japan
- Original language: Japanese
- No. of episodes: 48 (list of episodes)

Production
- Producers: Chihiro Inoue (TV Asahi); Kei Mizutani (TV Asahi); Kazuhiro Takahashi (Toei)
- Running time: 25 minutes
- Production companies: TV Asahi; Toei Company; ADK Emotions

Original release
- Network: ANN (TV Asahi)
- Release: September 6, 2020 – August 29, 2021

Related
- Kamen Rider Zero-One; Kamen Rider Revice

Kamen Rider Saber (仮面ライダーセイバー(聖刃), Kamen Raidā Seibā) (Note: The characters used for Kamen Rider Saber's "聖刃" Logo formation translate to ''Holy Blade.'') is a Japanese tokusatsu drama, the 31st entry of Toei Company's Kamen Rider franchise, and the second series to debut during the Reiwa period. The series premiered on September 6, 2020, joining Mashin Sentai Kiramager, and later, Kikai Sentai Zenkaiger in the Super Hero Time line-up after Kamen Rider Zero-One's finale. The series concluded on August 29, 2021 and was succeeded by Kamen Rider Revice. The series is notable for its use of a fantasy setting and its storybook theming.

== Premise ==
The human world collides with Wonder World, a realm of fairy tales, because of a conflict over the Almighty Book – a legendary artifact of great power that a trio of monsters known as the Megids seek to acquire in order to create more of their kind, and that an organization of swordsmen known as the Sword of Logos seeks to protect. Two millennia later, the Dark Swordsman Hayato Fukamiya, also known as Kamen Rider Calibur, betrayed his comrades after learning a terrible truth and was seemingly killed by the Flame Swordsman Daichi Kamijo, with a girl named Luna being an apparent causality of their fight. Daichi gave his Wonder Ride Book to a boy named Touma Kamiyama before leaving his sword behind.

Fifteen years later, Touma has become a novelist and bookstore owner. After being caught in a Megid attack, his attempt to stop it causes him to inherit Kamijo's title as Kamen Rider Saber and he resolves to end the conflict after the Water Swordsman, Rintaro Shindo, recruits him to join the Sword of Logos. Among the other swordsmen Touma meets while recovering his memories and the lost Wonder Ride Books is his childhood friend, Kento Fukamiya, who wishes to understand his father's actions after Calibur reappears as an ally of the Megids.

== Production ==
The Kamen Rider Saber trademark was registered by Toei on May 29, 2020.

On 22 July 2020, Kamen Rider Saber was officially announced during a press conference alongside its cast, and it was announced that the show was planned to feature at least 10 Riders. Along with the titular character, five other Riders were confirmed: Blades, Espada, Buster, Kenzan, and Calibur. Following the series premiere, additional Riders Slash, Falchion, Saikou, Sabela, Durandal, Solomon, and Storious were announced to be part of the cast.

The opening theme song "ALMIGHTY ~Kamen no Yakusoku" is performed by the band Tokyo Ska Paradise Orchestra with the band Alexandros' Yoohei Kawakami, who provides the vocals. Tokyo Ska Paradise Orchestra also performs the ending theme song "Kamen Rider Saber", with Kinichi Motegi, the band's drummer, providing the vocals. This is the first time since Kamen Rider Hibiki that an ending theme was produced, and the ending footage is also the first time in the Kamen Rider series to be primarily centered around dance.

== Episodes ==
No.	Title	Directed by	Written by	Original release date
1	"In the Beginning, There Was a Flame Swordsman."; Transliteration: "Hajime ni, Honō no Kenshi Ari." (Japanese: はじめに、炎の剣士あり。)	Takayuki Shibasaki	Takuro Fukuda	September 6, 2020
2	"The Water Swordsman Along With a Blue Lion."; Transliteration: "Mizu no Kenshi, Aoi Raion to Tomo ni." (Japanese: 水の剣士、青いライオンとともに。)	Takayuki Shibasaki	Takuro Fukuda	September 13, 2020
3	"A Father and a Swordsman."; Transliteration: "Chichi de Ari, Kenshi." (Japanese: 父であり、剣士。)	Shojiro Nakazawa	Nobuhiro Mouri	September 20, 2020
4	"The Book Was Opened, Therefore."; Transliteration: "Hon o Hiraita, Sore Yue ni." (Japanese: 本を開いた、それゆえに。)	Shojiro Nakazawa	Nobuhiro Mouri	September 27, 2020
5	"My Friend Is the Thunder Swordsman."; Transliteration: "Waga Tomo, Kaminari no Kenshi ni Tsuki." (Japanese: 我が友、雷の剣士につき。)	Kazuya Kamihoriuchi	Takuro Fukuda	October 4, 2020
6	"Appearing Like the Wind."; Transliteration: "Hayate no Gotoku, Kenzan." (Japanese: 疾風の如く、見参。)	Kazuya Kamihoriuchi	Takuro Fukuda	October 11, 2020
7	"The Sword of the King Lies in Avalon."; Transliteration: "Ō no Tsurugi, Avaron ni Ari." (Japanese: 王の剣、アヴァロンにあり。)	Hidenori Ishida	Keiichi Hasegawa	October 18, 2020
8	"The Sealed Arthur."; Transliteration: "Fūin Sareshi wa, Āsā." (Japanese: 封印されしは、アーサー。)	Hidenori Ishida	Keiichi Hasegawa	October 25, 2020
9	"The Overlapping of the Swordsman's Timbre."; Transliteration: "Kasanariau, Kenshi no Neiro." (Japanese: 重なり合う、剣士の音色。)	Koichi Sakamoto	Nobuhiro Mouri	November 8, 2020
10	"Crossing Swords and Crossing Feelings."; Transliteration: "Majiwaru Tsurugi to, Kōsa Suru Omoi." (Japanese: 交わる剣と、交差する想い。)	Koichi Sakamoto	Nobuhiro Mouri	November 15, 2020
11	"The Storming Thunder and the Spreading of Dark Clouds."; Transliteration: "Midareru Kaminari, Hirogaru An'un." (Japanese: 乱れる雷、広がる暗雲。)	Shojiro Nakazawa	Keiichi Hasegawa	November 22, 2020
12	"In That Place Where We Made Our Promise."; Transliteration: "Yakusoku no, Ano Basho de." (Japanese: 約束の、あの場所で。)	Shojiro Nakazawa	Keiichi Hasegawa	November 29, 2020
13	"I Will Stick to My Convictions."; Transliteration: "Ore wa, Ore no, Omoi o Tsuranuku." (Japanese: 俺は、俺の、思いを貫く。)	Hidenori Ishida	Takuro Fukuda	December 6, 2020
14	"These Feelings Dwell in the Sword."; Transliteration: "Kono Omoi, Tsurugi ni Yadoshite." (Japanese: この思い、剣に宿して。)	Hidenori Ishida	Takuro Fukuda	December 13, 2020
15	"Beyond the Resolution."; Transliteration: "Kakugo o Koeta, Sono Saki ni." (Japanese: 覚悟を超えた、その先に。)	Koichi Sakamoto	Keiichi Hasegawa	December 20, 2020
16	"A Ray of Light That Saves the World."; Transliteration: "Sekai o Sukuu, Hitosuji no Hikari." (Japanese: 世界を救う、一筋の光。)	Koichi Sakamoto	Keiichi Hasegawa	December 27, 2020
17	"Whether the Ancient Messenger Is Light or Shadow."; Transliteration: "Inishie no Shisha wa, Hikari ka Kage ka." (Japanese: 古の使者は、光か影か。)	Satoshi Morota	Nobuhiro Mouri	January 10, 2021
18	"Defeating the Megid With a Flaming Tenacity."; Transliteration: "Honō no Shūnen, Megido o Utsu." (Japanese: 炎の執念、メギドを討つ。)	Satoshi Morota	Nobuhiro Mouri	January 17, 2021
19	"Flame and Light, Sword and Sword."; Transliteration: "Honō to Hikari, Ken to Ken." (Japanese: 炎と光、剣と剣。)	Hidenori Ishida	Takuro Fukuda	January 24, 2021
20	"The Will of the Sword to Destroy the Stronghold."; Transliteration: "Gajō o Kuzusu, Ken no Ishi." (Japanese: 牙城を崩す、剣の意志。)	Hidenori Ishida	Takuro Fukuda	January 31, 2021
21	"Shine Brightest in Full Color."; Transliteration: "Saikō ni Kagayake, Furu Karā." (Japanese: 最高に輝け、全身全色(フルカラー)。)	Teruaki Sugihara	Keiichi Hasegawa	February 7, 2021
22	"Even So, I Still Want to Save People."; Transliteration: "Sore demo, Hito o Sukuitai." (Japanese: それでも、人を救いたい。)	Teruaki Sugihara	Keiichi Hasegawa	February 14, 2021
23	"The Raging Hand of Destruction."; Transliteration: "Arekuruu, Hakai no Te." (Japanese: 荒れ狂う、破壊の手。)	Takayuki Shibasaki	Nobuhiro Mouri	February 21, 2021
24	"Father's Back Bearing the Future."; Transliteration: "Chichi no Senaka, Seotta Mirai." (Japanese: 父の背中、背負った未来。)	Takayuki Shibasaki	Nobuhiro Mouri	February 28, 2021
25	"The Crimson Assassin Enveloped in Smoke."; Transliteration: "Kemuri o Matoishi, Shinku no Shikaku." (Japanese: 煙をまといし、真紅の刺客。)	Kazuya Kamihoriuchi	Takuro Fukuda	March 7, 2021
26	"Deep Darkness With a Sword."; Transliteration: "Fukaki Yami, Ken to Tomo ni." (Japanese: 深き闇、剣と共に。)	Kazuya Kamihoriuchi	Takuro Fukuda	March 14, 2021
27	"Turning Sorrow into a Smile."; Transliteration: "Kanashimi o, Egao ni Kaete." (Japanese: 哀しみを、笑顔に変えて。)	Koichi Sakamoto	Keiichi Hasegawa	March 21, 2021
28	"Writing the Past, Drawing the Future."; Transliteration: "Shirusu Kako, Egaku Mirai." (Japanese: 記す過去、描く未来。)	Koichi Sakamoto	Keiichi Hasegawa	March 28, 2021
29	"At That Moment, the Swordsman Made His Move."; Transliteration: "Sono Toki, Kenshi ga Ugoita." (Japanese: その時、剣士が動いた。)	Koichi Sakamoto	Keiichi Hasegawa	April 4, 2021
30	"Even When Bonds Are Torn Apart."; Transliteration: "Kizuna, Kirisakarete mo." (Japanese: 絆、切り裂かれても。)	Hidenori Ishida	Takuro Fukuda	April 11, 2021
31	"Strength to Trust, Strength to Believe in." Transliteration: "Shinjiru Tsuyosa, Shinjirareru Tsuyosa." (Japanese: 信じる強さ、信じられる強さ。)	Hidenori Ishida	Takuro Fukuda	April 18, 2021
32	"My Feelings Crystallized."; Transliteration: "Boku no Omoi, Kesshō to Narite." (Japanese: 僕の想い、結晶となりて。)	Teruaki Sugihara	Hiroki Uchida	April 25, 2021
33	"Even So, the Future Can Be Changed."; Transliteration: "Sore demo, Mirai wa Kaerareru." (Japanese: それでも、未来は変えられる。)	Teruaki Sugihara	Hiroki Uchida	May 2, 2021
34	"The Immortal Swordsman Awakens."; Transliteration: "Me o Samasu, Fushi no Kenshi." (Japanese: 目を覚ます、不死の剣士。)	Satoshi Morota	Keiichi Hasegawa	May 9, 2021
35	"And I Will Become a God."; Transliteration: "Soshite Watashi wa, Kami ni Naru." (Japanese: そして私は、神になる。)	Satoshi Morota	Keiichi Hasegawa	May 16, 2021
36	"The Power of the Almighty Is Opened."; Transliteration: "Hirakareru, Zenchizen'nō no Chikara." (Japanese: 開かれる、全知全能の力。)	Hiroki Kashiwagi	Nobuhiro Mouri	May 23, 2021
37	"Who Will Change the Future?"; Transliteration: "Mirai o Kaeru no wa, Dare da." (Japanese: 未来を変えるのは、誰だ。)	Hiroki Kashiwagi	Nobuhiro Mouri	May 30, 2021
38	"The Galactic Sword That Unites the Seiken."; Transliteration: "Seiken o Tabaneru, Ginga no Tsurugi." (Japanese: 聖剣を束ねる、銀河の剣。)	Takayuki Shibasaki	Hiroki Uchida	June 6, 2021
39	"Swordsmen, Follow the Path You Believe in." Transliteration: "Kenshi yo, Shinjiru Michi o Ike." (Japanese: 剣士よ、信じる道を行け。)	Takayuki Shibasaki	Hiroki Uchida	June 13, 2021
40	"The Shining Friendship of Three Swordsmen."; Transliteration: "Kagayaku Yūjō, San Kenshi." (Japanese: 輝く友情、三剣士。)	Hidenori Ishida	Keiichi Hasegawa	June 20, 2021
41	"A Wish Composed Over Two Thousand Years."; Transliteration: "Nisen-nen, Tsuzurareta Negai." (Japanese: 二千年、綴られた願い。)	Hidenori Ishida	Keiichi Hasegawa	June 27, 2021
42	"The Beginning of a Beautiful Ending."; Transliteration: "Hajimaru, Utsukushī Owari." (Japanese: はじまる、美しい終わり。)	Kazuya Kamihoriuchi	Takuro Fukuda	July 4, 2021
43	"A Clash of the Value of Existence."; Transliteration: "Gekitotsu, Sonzai Suru Kachi." (Japanese: 激突、存在する価値。)	Kazuya Kamihoriuchi	Takuro Fukuda	July 11, 2021
SP	"The World Pirate is Coming, Intersecting Worlds."; Transliteration: "Kaizoku Kitarite, Majiwaru Sekai." (Japanese: 界賊来たりて、交わる世界。)	Satoshi Morota	Nobuhiro Mouri	July 18, 2021
44	"The Last Page Is Opened."; Transliteration: "Hiraku, Saigo no Pēji." (Japanese: 開く、最後のページ。)	Teruaki Sugihara	Keiichi Hasegawa	August 1, 2021
45	"Ten Swordsmen With the World on the Line."; Transliteration: "Jukkenshi, Sekai o Kakete." (Japanese: 十剣士、世界を賭けて。)	Teruaki Sugihara	Keiichi Hasegawa	August 8, 2021
46	"Farewell, My Hero."; Transliteration: "Sayōnara, Watashi no Eiyū." (Japanese: さようなら、私の英雄。)	Hidenori Ishida	Keiichi Hasegawa	August 15, 2021
47	"The End of the World, the Birth of a Story."; Transliteration: "Owaru Sekai, Umareru Monogatari." (Japanese: 終わる世界、生まれる物語。)	Hidenori Ishida	Keiichi Hasegawa	August 22, 2021
Special–Issue	"When a New Page Is Opened,"; Transliteration: "Aratana Pēji ga, Hiraku Toki," (Japanese: 新たなページが、開くとき、)	Hidenori Ishida	Hiroki Uchida	August 29, 2021

== Films ==
=== The Phoenix Swordsman and the Book of Ruin ===
Kamen Rider Saber Theatrical Short Story: The Phoenix Swordsman and the Book of Ruin (劇場短編 仮面ライダーセイバー 不死鳥の剣士と破滅の本, Gekijō Tanpen Kamen Raidā Seibā Fushichō no Kenshi to Hametsu no Hon) was released on December 18, 2020, double billed with Kamen Rider Zero-One the Movie: Real×Time. Actor Masashi Taniguchi portrays the film's main antagonist, Bahato, who also appears in the series as a recurring character. The theme song is "Taju Roko" performed by Tokyo Ska Paradise Orchestra with Yoohei Kawakami. The events of the film take place between episodes 10–11.

=== Super Hero Senki ===
Saber + Zenkaiger: Super Hero Senki (セイバー＋ゼンカイジャー スーパーヒーロー戦記, Seibā Zenkaijā Sūpā Hīrō Senki) is a crossover film released on July 22, 2021, starring the casts from Saber and Kikai Sentai Zenkaiger and featuring characters from past entries of the franchises involved. The film is part of the celebrations for both the 50th anniversary of the Kamen Rider franchise and the 45th anniversary of the Super Sentai franchise, and serves as the final crossover between them. Actors Fuku Suzuki and Ayumi Tanida portray Shotaro Ishinomori and the film's main antagonist, Asmodeus, respectively. Kenjirō Ishimaru of Kamen Rider Den-O; Takashi Ukaji of Kamen Rider OOO; So Okuno of Kamen Rider Zi-O; Fumiya Takahashi of Kamen Rider Zero-One; Shogo Suzuki of Samurai Sentai Shinkenger; Atomu Mizuishi of Mashin Sentai Kiramager; and Hiroshi Fujioka of Kamen Rider (1971 - 1973) reprised their respective roles while Naoya Makoto of Himitsu Sentai Gorenger; Toshihiko Seki, Kōji Yusa, Masaki Terasoma, and Kenichi Suzumura of Kamen Rider Den-O; Tetsu Inada of Tokusou Sentai Dekaranger; M·A·O and Hiroshi Kamiya of Uchu Sentai Kyuranger; and Rikiya Koyama of Kamen Rider Zi-O reprise their respective voice roles. Additionally, the two main characters of Kamen Rider Revice make their first appearances and a special film for the series was double billed with Super Hero Senki. The theme song is "SPARK" performed by Tokyo Ska Paradise Orchestra. The events of the film take place after the two-part Movie Release Commemorative Combo Special, which itself takes place between episodes 39 and 40.

=== Beyond Generations ===
Kamen Rider: Beyond Generations (仮面ライダー ビヨンド・ジェネレーションズ, Kamen Raidā Biyondo Jenerēshonzu) is a crossover film released on December 17, 2021, starring the casts of Saber and Kamen Rider Revice. The film features a new Kamen Rider from a possible future in the year 2071, 100 years after the debut of the first Kamen Rider television series. Akiyoshi Nakao and Arata Furuta portray the film's guest characters and Hiroshi Fujioka's son, Maito, portrays Takeshi Hongo's younger self.

== Web-exclusive series ==
- Kamen Rider Saber Spin-off: Swordsman History (仮面ライダーセイバー スピンオフ 剣士列伝, Kamen Raidā Seibā Supin'ofu Kenshi Retsuden) is a web-exclusive series released on Telasa on November 8, 2020. It comprises four episodes and focuses on Rintaro Shindo, Kento Fukamiya, Ryo Ogami, Ren Akamichi, and Tetsuo Daishinji.
1. Chapter 8.5: An Episode of Kamen Riders Slash & Buster (an episode of 仮面ライダースラッシュ＆バスター, An Episode of Kamen Raidā Surasshu Ando Basutā)
2. The Other Side of Chapter 9: An Episode of Kamen Rider Kenzan (an episode of 仮面ライダー剣斬, An Episode of Kamen Raidā Kenzan)
3. Behind the Chapter 13: An Episode of Kamen Rider Espada (an episode of 仮面ライダーエスパーダ, An Episode of Kamen Raidā Esupāda)
4. Chapter 15.5: An Episode of Kamen Rider Blades (an episode of 仮面ライダーブレイズ, An Episode of Kamen Raidā Bureizu)
- Separate Volume Kamen Rider Saber: Short Animation Collection (別冊 仮面ライダーセイバー 短編活動萬画集, Bessatsu Kamen Raidā Seibā Tanpen Katsudō Mangashū) is a web-exclusive animated short series released on Toei Tokusatsu Fan Club on February 1, 2021.
1. Dance Performance, Just Before It. (ダンス本番、その前に。, Dansu Honban, Sono Mae ni.)
2. Rock, Scissors, and Paper. (ロック、シザーズ、ペイパー。, Rokku, Shizāzu, Peipā.)
3. Save Sophia, the Electric Shock Escape Game: Part 1. (ソフィアを救え、電流ビリビリ脱出ゲーム〜前編〜。, Sofia o Sukue, Denryū Biribiri Dasshutsu Gēmu Zenpen.)
4. Save Sophia, the Electric Shock Escape Game: Part 2. (ソフィアを救え、電流ビリビリ脱出ゲーム〜後編〜。, Sofia o Sukue, Denryū Biribiri Dasshutsu Gēmu Kōhen.)
5. Le Grand Supermarché. (ル・グラン、シューペルマルシェ。, Ru Guran, Shūperumarushe.)
6. 2021, We Will Show You Everything! NG Award. (2021年、全部見せます！NG大賞。, Nisen-nijū-ichi-nen, Zenbu Misemasu! Enu Jī Taishō.)
- Kamen Rider Saber × Ghost is a web-exclusive series of Toei Tokusatsu Fan Club serves as a crossover between Saber and Kamen Rider Ghost, with Shun Nishime and Mio Kudo reprising their respective roles as Takeru Tenkūji and Kanon Fukami: The events of the series take place between episodes 38 and 39.
  - Kamen Rider Saber × Ghost (仮面ライダーセイバー×ゴースト, Kamen Raidā Seibā Gōsuto) is the titular first entry of the web-series released on May 23, 2021, with Sotaro returning to reprise his role as Javel.
  - Kamen Rider Specter × Blades (仮面ライダースペクター×ブレイズ, Kamen Raidā Supekutā Bureizu) is a sequel to the titular first entry of the web-series released on June 27, 2021, with Ryosuke Yamamoto returning to reprise his role as Makoto Fukami.
- Kamen Rider Saber Spin-off: Kamen Rider Sabela & Durendal (仮面ライダーセイバー スピンオフ 仮面ライダーサーベラ＆デュランダル, Kamen Raidā Seibā Supin'ofu Kamen Raidā Sābera Ando Durandaru) is a web-exclusive special released on Toei Tokusatsu Fan Club on November 20, 2022. The events of the special take place a year after the end of the main series.

== DVD and Blu-ray-exclusive series ==
- Sword of Logos Saga (ソードオブロゴスサーガ, Sōdo Obu Rogosu Sāga) is included as part of the Blu-ray releases of Kamen Rider Saber. This storyline focuses on the lives of three known bearers of the Kamen Rider Calibur title:
  - Part 1 serves as a prequel to the main series and focuses on Hayato Fukamiya and Daichi Kamijo.
  - Part 2 takes place during episodes 17–35, and focuses on Kento Fukamiya. It was released on August 4, 2021.
- Gather! Hero!! The Explosive Birth of Dragon Televi-Kun (集え！ヒーロー！！爆誕ドラゴンてれびくん, Tsudoe! Hīrō!! Bakutan Doragon Terebikun) is Televi-Kun's "Hyper Battle DVD" (超(ハイパー)バトルDVD, Haipā Batoru Dī Bui Dī).

== V-Cinema ==
Kamen Rider Saber: Trio of Deep Sin (仮面ライダーセイバー 深罪の三重奏(トリオ), Kamen Raidā Seibā Shinzai no Torio) is a V-Cinema release which received a limited theatrical release on January 28, 2022, followed by its DVD and Blu-ray release on May 11, 2022. The events of the V-Cinema take place eight years after the end of the main series. The V-Cinema was written by Takuro Fukuda and directed by Kazuya Kamihoriuchi. The theme song is "Bittersweet" performed by Asuka Kawazu, Shuichiro Naito, Takaya Yamaguchi, and Ryo Aoki.

== Manga ==
Supplementary Volume Kamen Rider Saber: Kamen Rider Buster the Comic (別冊 仮面ライダーセイバー 萬画 仮面ライダーバスター, Bessatsu Kamen Raidā Seibā Manga Kamen Raidā Basutā) is a manga adaptation that focuses on Ryo Ogami's past, including his high school days two decades prior and the birth of his son, Sora, six years after Daichi Kamijo defeated Hayato Fukamiya. The manga is written by Kaori Kaneko and illustrated by Keitarō Kumatsuki, and was serialized on Toei Tokusatsu Fan Club from February 28, 2021, to May 30, 2021. Each arc of the manga consists of three chapters.

1. Strongest Youth (最強の青春編, Saikyō no Seishun-hen)
2. Ultimate King of Parenting (最強の子育て王編, Saikyō no Kosodate Ō-hen)

== Cast ==
- Touma Kamiyama (神山 飛羽真, Kamiyama Tōma): Shuichiro Naito (内藤 秀一郎, Naitō Shūichirō)
- Rintaro Shindo (新堂 倫太郎, Shindō Rintarō): Takaya Yamaguchi (山口 貴也, Yamaguchi Takaya)
- Mei Sudo (須藤 芽依, Sudō Mei): Asuka Kawazu (川津 明日香, Kawazu Asuka)
- Kento Fukamiya (富加宮 賢人, Fukamiya Kento): Ryo Aoki (青木 瞭, Aoki Ryō)
- Ryo Ogami (尾上 亮, Ogami Ryō): Yuki Ikushima (生島 勇輝, Ikushima Yūki)
- Ren Akamichi (緋道 連, Akamichi Ren): Eiji Togashi (富樫 慧士, Togashi Eiji)
- Tetsuo Daishinji (大秦寺 哲雄, Daishinji Tetsuo): Hiroaki Oka (岡 宏明, Oka Hiroaki)
- Yuri (ユーリ, Yūri): Tomohiro Ichikawa (市川 知宏, Ichikawa Tomohiro)
- Reika Shindai (神代 玲花, Shindai Reika): Mei Angela (アンジェラ 芽衣, Anjera Mei)
- Ryoga Shindai (神代 凌牙, Shindai Ryōga): Ken Shonozaki (庄野崎 謙, Shōnozaki Ken)
- Storious (ストリウス, Sutoriusu): Robin Furuya (古屋 呂敏, Furuya Robin)
- Legeiel (レジエル, Rejieru): Kyle Takano (高野 海琉, Takano Kairu)
- Zooous (ズオス, Zuosu): Koji Saikawa (才川 コージ, Saikawa Kōji)
- Isaac (イザク, Izaku), Original Master Logos (初代マスターロゴス, Shodai Masutā Rogosu): Keisuke Sohma (相馬 圭祐, Sōma Keisuke) (Note: Isaac is credited as "Master Logos" (マスターロゴス, Masutā Rogosu) for most episodes. Episode 23 credited the former as "Southern Base Guardsman".)
- Bahato (バハト): Masashi Taniguchi (谷口 賢志, Taniguchi Masashi)
- Luna (ルナ, Runa): Miku Okamoto (岡本 望来, Okamoto Miku) (Child), Mayuu Yokota (横田 真悠, Yokota Mayū) (Adult)
- Sora Ogami (尾上 そら, Ogami Sora): Tenta Banka (番家 天嵩, Banka Tenta)
- Tassel (タッセル, Tasseru): Tobi (レ・ロマネスクTOBI, Re Romanesuku Tobī)
- Daichi Kamijo (上條 大地, Kamijō Daichi): Hiroyuki Hirayama (平山 浩行, Hirayama Hiroyuki)
- Sophia (ソフィア, Sofia), Another Sophia, Priestess: Rina Chinen (知念 里奈, Chinen Rina)

=== Voice cast ===
- Desast (デザスト, Dezasuto): Kōki Uchiyama (内山 昂輝, Uchiyama Kōki)
- Charybdis (カリュブディス, Karyubudisu): Ryota Iwasaki (岩崎 諒太, Iwasaki Ryōta)
- Seiken (聖剣) (Speaking), Wonder Ride Books (ワンダーライドブック, Wandā Raido Bukku), Narrator: Akio Ōtsuka (大塚 明夫, Ōtsuka Akio)
- Seiken (Singing): Eizo Sakamoto (坂本 英三, Sakamoto Eizō)
- Eneiken Noroshi (煙叡剣狼煙, En'eiken Noroshi): Miyu Fukuda (福田 みゆ, Fukuda Miyu)

=== Guest cast ===
- Ryota (亮太, Ryōta; 1): Rento Nishiyama (西山 蓮都, Nishiyama Rento)
- Fighting Fairy (戦う妖精さん, Tatakau Yōsei-san; 4): Reika Saiki (才木 玲佳, Saiki Reika)
- Hayato Fukamiya (富加宮 隼人, Fukamiya Hayato; 5, 15, 38, 45): Mitsuru Karahashi (唐橋 充, Karahashi Mitsuru)
- Kenshin Nagamine (長嶺 謙信, Nagamine Kenshin; 7, 32): Masashi Mikami (三上 真史, Mikami Masashi)
- Men (8): (Note: The two unnamed characters resemble Hideyasu Jonouchi and Alfonso Pierre Oren of Kamen Rider Gaim, but are not meant to be the same characters.) Ryo Matsuda (松田 凌, Matsuda Ryō), Metal Yoshida (吉田 メタル, Yoshida Metaru)
- Yuki Shirai (白井 ゆき, Shirai Yuki; 16–19, 28, 44, 47): Hitomi Hasebe (長谷部 瞳, Hasebe Hitomi)
- Married couple (16): Hideyoshi Iwata (岩田 栄慶, Iwata Hideyoshi), Mayu Iwata (岩田 眞優, Iwata Mayu)
- Zocks Goldtsuiker (ゾックス・ゴールドツイカー, Zokkusu Gōrudotsuikā; SP): Atsuki Mashiko (増子 敦貴, Mashiko Atsuki)
- Humagear (ヒューマギア, Hyūmagia; 47): Keiichi Hasegawa (長谷川 圭一, Hasegawa Keiichi)
- Ikki Igarashi (五十嵐 一輝, Igarashi Ikki; Special Issue): Kentaro Maeda (前田 拳太郎, Maeda Kentarō)
- Vice (バイス, Baisu; Voice; Special Issue): Subaru Kimura (木村 昴, Kimura Subaru)
- Revice Driver (リバイスドライバー, Ribaisu Doraibā; Voice; Special Issue), Vistamps (バイスタンプ, Baisutanpu; Voice; Special Issue): Shingo Fujimori (藤森 慎吾, Fujimori Shingo)
- George Karizaki (ジョージ・狩崎, Jōji Karizaki; Special Issue): Noritaka Hamao (濱尾 ノリタカ, Hamao Noritaka)
- Orteca (オルテカ, Oruteka; Voice; Special Issue): Hayata Seki (関 隼汰, Seki Hayata)

== Theme songs ==
Opening theme

- "ALMIGHTY ~Kamen no Yakusoku feat. Yoohei Kawakami" (ALMIGHTY～仮面の約束 feat.川上洋平, ALMIGHTY ~Kamen no Yakusoku Fīcharingu Kawakami Yōhei; "Almighty ~The Masked Promise feat. Yoohei Kawakami")
  - Lyrics: Atsushi Yanaka
  - Composition: Tsuyoshi Kawakami
  - Artist & Arrangement: Tokyo Ska Paradise Orchestra
  - Vocals & Lyrics (English Translation): Yoohei Kawakami
  Episodes 1 and 47 do not feature the opening sequence. The song is used as an insert song in episodes 1, 10, 15, 27, and 47, as well as the ending theme in episode 47.

Ending theme

- "Kamen Rider Saber" (仮面ライダーセイバー, Kamen Raidā Seibā)
  - Lyrics: Atsushi Yanaka
  - Composition: Takashi Kato
  - Artist & Arrangement: Tokyo Ska Paradise Orchestra
  - Vocals: Kinichi Motegi
  Episodes 15, 44, 47 and 48 do not feature the ending sequence. The song is also entirely absent in episode 44 and 47.

Insert themes

- "Rewrite the story"
  - Lyrics: Shoko Fujibayashi
  - Composition: tatsuo
  - Artist: Shuichiro Naito, Takaya Yamaguchi, & Ryo Aoki
  - Episodes: 38–40
- "Will save us"
  - Lyrics: Shio Watanabe, Kazuya Kamihoriuchi
  - Composition: Shuhei Naruse
  - Artist: Asuka Kawazu
  - Episodes: 43
- "The story never ends"
  - Lyrics: Shoko Fujibayashi
  - Composition: Kousuke Yamashita
  - Artist: Rina Chinen
  - Episodes: 44
- "BOOK OF POWER"
  - Lyrics: Shoko Fujibayashi
  - Composition: tatsuo
  - Artist: Masanori Kobayashi (WAЯROCK)
  - Episodes: 45
  An instrumental version of this song is used.
- "Timeless Story"
  - Lyrics: Isa Takinoo
  - Composition: Kousuke Yamashita
  - Artist: Utabito Zanmai Samady
  - Episodes: 45, 47

== Broadcast, Home Video and Streaming ==
- In its home country of Japan, it originally aired on the Super Hero Time block on TV Asahi and other ANN affiliates starting from September 6, 2020, and concluding on August 29, 2021, with 48 episodes. Episodes 1, 2, and 28 were streamed in their entirety for free on the Toei Tokusatsu YouTube Official channel. Near the end of the series run, Toei Video released the full series on DVD and Blu-ray in 2021. For the DVD release, it spawned across 12 volumes, with each holding four episodes. For the Blu-Ray release, it spawned three separate Collections throughout that year, with Volume 1 released on May 21, Volume 2 on August 4 and Volume 3 on November 10, just a little over two months after the series concluded.
- Thailand was the first international country in the world to have a release of this series outside of Japan. It was shown as Masked Rider Saber (มาสค์ไรเดอร์เซเบอร์) and Dream Express (DEX) owns the rights to the broadcasting of this series. It first aired on October 3, 2021, on Channel 7 HD and was also broadcast via streaming on the Flixer app, starting with the first episode airing on the same day. The Thai subtitled release came out first, and then November 7, was when they started publishing a Thai dub. In 2024, the dub was re-broadcast on the Boomerang channel and also on GMM 25.
  - In the Chinese-speaking world, Both Mandarin (Taiwan dialect) and Cantonese dubs were produced and aired in Taiwan and Hong Kong respectively.
    - In Hong Kong, the series aired with a Cantonese Chinese dub starting on October 24, 2021, and finished on September 18, 2022, covering all 48 episodes, by airing once a week.
    - In Taiwan, the series aired with a Taiwanese Mandarin dub on the CHT MOD service starting on January 28, 2022 (over three months after the Cantonese Chinese dub's debut) and concluded on April 15, 2022, covering all 48 episodes, by airing on the weeknights.
- In South Korea, the series was translated directly to Korean (가면라이더 세이버) and it premiered on January 15, 2022, and ran until April 30, 2022, on Daewon Broadcasting's three channels (AniOne, AniBox and ChampTV). It was broadcast with a Korean dub that covered all 48 episodes.
- In Vietnam on February 9, 2023, it was announced that Skyline Media had the rights from Toei and ADK to bring the series over to the region on Netflix, as Kamen Rider Saber: Hiệp Sĩ Mặt Nạ: Thánh Kiếm (Kamen Rider Saber: Masked Knight: Holy Sword) and was shown on March of that year.
- In Indonesia, the series premiered on July 10, 2023, on RTV with an Indonesian dub and it also received an English language-styled logo for advertisements. All 48 episodes were covered.
- In the Philippines, it was aired on GMA Network's FantaSeries block with a Tagalog dub from January 1 to March 7, 2025, Re-runs from January 12 to March 20, 2026, with all 48 episodes covered.
