= Les Romanesques =

- Origin: Paris
- Years active: 2000–present
- Members: Tobi; Miya

Tobi
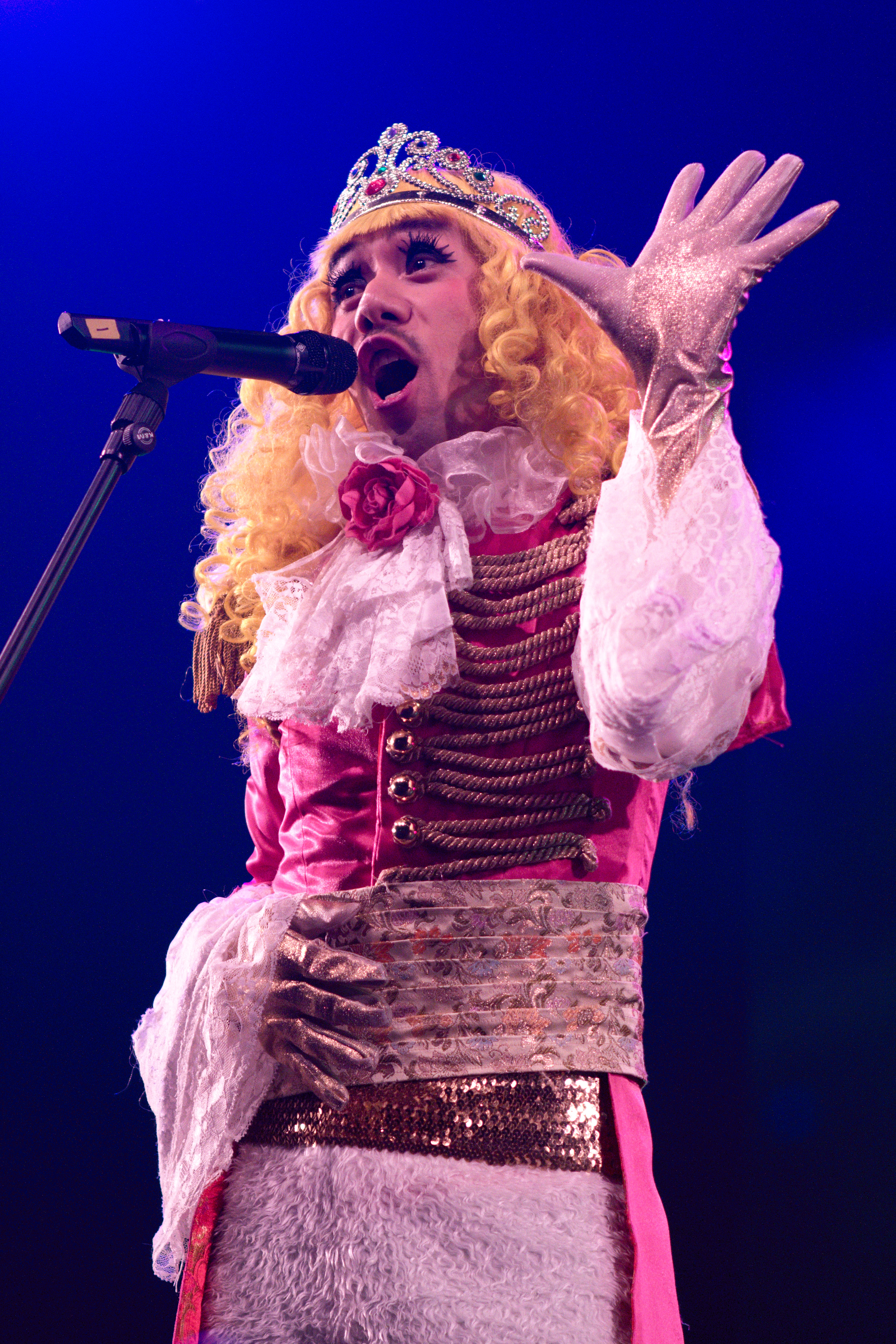
- Tobi at Japan Expo 2011

Miya
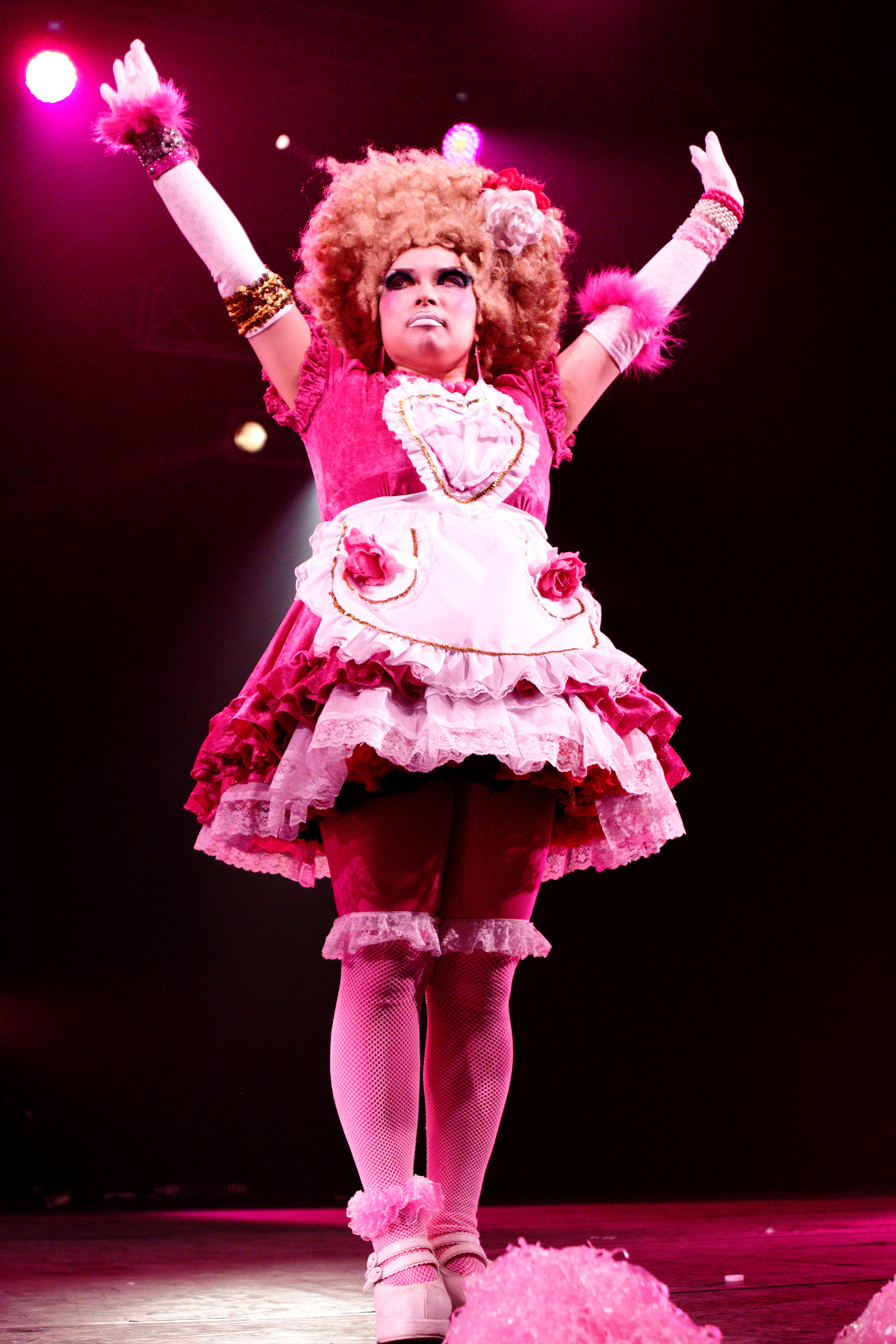
- Miya at Japan Expo 2011

Les Romanesques (レ・ロマネスク, Re Romanesuku) are a Paris-based Japanese performance duo. Composed of singer Romanesque Ishitobi (ロマネスク石飛, Romanesuku Ishitobi; a.k.a. "Tobi"), known for his signature blonde wig and prince persona, and dancer Romanesque Miyamae (ロマネスク宮前, Romanesuku Miyamae; a.k.a. "Miya"), known for her French maid/drag queen style, large blonde afro wig, and white-painted lips, Les Romanesques have appeared in many advertising campaigns in France, including for Mazda, and released several singles and albums. Their song "Théorème d'amour" was used in the independent production France Five. Les Romanesques also have appeared at various gay pride events, such as the 2009 Heritage of Pride and the 2010 PrideFest. The group achieved national fame in France after appearing on Incroyable Talent (France's Got Talent) in its 4th season. The YouTube posting of their performance became the #1 viewed video in all of France, and #4 worldwide. Ishitobi is a graduate of Keio University's economics program while Miyamae is a graduate of Waseda University's human sciences program.

== TV and radio ==
France

- M6 : La France a un incroyable talent
- ARTE : Juke Box Memories, Die Nacht - La Nuit
- Canal+ : Le Petit Journal
- Paris Première : Paris Dernière
- France 4 : Les Agités du bocal
- Virgin 17 : Baffie!
- Nolife : 101%, Tokyo Café
- Game One : Game Zone
- France Culture : Minuit dix
- Radio Nova : Nuits Zébrées
- Europe 1 : Baffie!
- Radio Campus Paris : La chambre à air

Japan

- NHK Educational TV : Otsuta-to-Denjiro(2013-)
- TV Asahi : Morning Bird!
  - Kamen Rider Saber : Narrator/Character Tassel played by Ishitobi - several episodes
- TBS : Hiruobi!, Sittoko!, Arabiki Dan
- Fuji TV : Sonokao ga mitemitai, FNN Speak
- Nippon TV : Sekai Marumie TV Tokusoubu, NEWS Real Time
- TV Tokyo : Sekai wo kaeru Japan All-Stars
- TVK : Hama Luncho
- Hiroshima Home TV : Hobby no Takumi, Début -We Love Singing!
- J:com : Tsunagaru 7

== CM ==
- S. T. Corporation Air Wash (TV)
- Mazda (Web-CM)
- Bluetooth (Web-CM)
- H.I.S. FRANCE (Web-CM)
- KIOKO (Web-CM)

== Songs ==
- J'ai 17 ans
- Yokozuna - The King Of Sumotori
- Samurai Dandy
- Mademoiseeelle
- Zoun-Doko Bushi
