= List of Kamen Rider Ghost characters =

Kamen Rider Ghost (仮面ライダーゴースト, Kamen Raidā Gōsuto) is a Japanese tokusatsu series that serves as the 26th installment in the Kamen Rider franchise and the 17th entry in the Heisei era.

== Main characters ==
=== Takeru Tenkūji ===
Takeru Tenkūji (天空寺 タケル, Tenkūji Takeru) is the current heir to Daitenkū-ji who displays an interest in historical figures after his ghost hunter father, Ryū, left him the tsuba from Miyamoto Musashi's katana, which the former wears as a necklace, and enjoys reading from a book titled Stories of the World's Greatest People (世界偉人伝, Sekai Ijinden). Wishing to follow in his father's footsteps despite being unable to see ghosts, Takeru receives a Ghost Eyecon (ゴースト眼魂, Gōsuto Aikon) (Note: Aikon (眼魂（アイコン）) literally means "Eye Soul".) on his 18th birthday, which allows him to see monstrous ghosts called Gamma before they kill him for other Eyecons. A mysterious hermit brings Takeru back to life as a ghost and grants him the ability to transform into Kamen Rider Ghost as the latter has 99 days to find 15 Eyecons based on famous historical figures to fully restore his life.

After seeing his childhood friend Makoto Fukami become the cold Kamen Rider Specter as a result of his sister Kanon's body being trapped in the Gamma World, Takeru sacrifices the opportunity to revive himself to save Kanon instead and gains the ability to enter people's memories following his first trip to the Gamma World. Along the way, Takeru discovers Ryū got in a fight with Edith for involving him in the latter's ghost hunting expeditions, but his father did so because of his potential to bring peace between the human and Gamma Worlds. Additionally, Takeru's Eyecon was supposed to contain Ryū's soul and if he does not restore his original body within another 99 days, both Tenkūjis will disappear forever. While doing so, Takeru and his allies save the world from the Gammisers and he receives multiple wishes from the Great Eye in recognition of his good deeds. Using one to fully revive himself, Takeru returns to high school to finish his education.

In the tie-in novel Novel: Kamen Rider Ghost: Memories to the Future, Takeru marries Chloe after sacrificing the Mugen Eyecon and half of his life force with the Great Eye's help, eventually having a son named Ayumu not long after. In the near future, the lack of his Mugen Eyecon prevents him from accessing his full potential and he is absorbed by the Great Demia. However, Takeru is rescued after Ayumu dons the mantle of Ghost and kills the Great Demia without endangering Takeru's life, allowing him to reunite with his family once more.

Utilizing the Ore (オレ; Me) Eyecon, which contains his soul, in conjunction with the Ghost Driver (ゴーストドライバー, Gōsuto Doraibā) belt, Takeru can transform into Kamen Rider Ghost Ore Damashii (オレ魂). While transformed, he gains levitation capabilities and can perform the Omega Drive (オメガドライブ, Omega Doraibu) finisher. He also wields the Gan Gun Saber (ガンガンセイバー, Gan Gan Seibā; Eye Gun Saber), which can be reconfigured into varying forms, such as its sword-like Blade Mode (ブレードモード, Burēdo Mōdo) for performing the Omega Break (オメガブレイク, Omega Bureiku) finisher and its double-bladed Naginata Mode (ナギナタモード, Naginata Mōdo) for performing the Omega Stream (オメガストリーム, Omega Sutorīmu) finisher. His personal vehicles are the Machine Ghostriker (マシンゴーストライカー, Mashin Gōsutoraikā) motorcycle and the ghost ship-esque Captain Ghost (キャプテンゴースト, Kyaputen Gōsuto) aircraft, which can combine to form the Iguana Ghostriker (イグアナゴーストライカー, Iguana Gōsutoraikā) mecha. Additionally, Takeru possesses other Damashii (魂; "spirit or soul") forms, which are as follows:

- Toucon Boost Damashii (闘魂ブースト魂, Tōkon Būsuto Damashii): (Note: Initially referred to as "Tousan Damashii" (トウサン魂, Tōsan Damashii; lit. "Father Soul").) The evolved form of Ore Damashii accessed from the Toucon Boost (闘魂ブースト, Tōkon Būsuto; Fighting Spirit Boost) Eyecon, which is powered by Ryū's soul, that allows Takeru to enhance any of his preexisting Damashii and grants pyrokinesis. In this and all subsequent forms, he wields the Sunglasseslasher (サングラスラッシャー, Sangurasurasshā), which has a Sword Mode (ソードモード, Sōdo Mōdo) for performing the (Mega) Omega Shine ((メガ) オメガシャイン, (Mega) Omega Shain) finisher and a Blaster Mode (ブラスターモード, Burasutā Mōdo) for performing the (Mega) Omega Flash ((メガ) オメガフラッシュ, (Mega) Omega Furasshu) finisher. His finisher in this form is the Boost Omega Drive (ブーストオメガドライブ, Būsuto Omega Doraibu). Initially, this form served as Takeru's sole means of accessing Goemon, Ryoma, and Himiko Damashii to keep up with their enormous power until his continuous development as a Kamen Rider allowed him to access their forms with Ore Damashii. This form first appears in the non-canonical crossover film Kamen Rider × Kamen Rider Ghost & Drive: Super Movie War Genesis.
- Grateful Damashii (グレイトフル魂, Gureitofuru Damashii): Takeru's super form accessed from the Eyecon Driver G (アイコンドライバーG, Aikon Doraibā Jī) belt, also known as the "Giant Eyecon" (デッカい眼魂, Dekkai Aikon), that allows him to utilize the powers of all 15 heroic Eyecons at once and grants the ability to summon their Hoodie Ghosts for combat assistance. However, the Eyecon Driver G can only function if Takeru assembles all 15 heroic Eyecons' spirits into a team, as he will lose access to this form if even one spirit does not cooperate with him. His finishers in this form are the Grateful Omega Drive (グレイトフル オメガドライブ, Gureitofuru Omega Doraibu) on his own and the (Mega) Omega Formation ((メガ) オメガフォーメーション, (Mega) Omega Fōmēshon) alongside the Hoodie Ghosts.
- Mugen Damashii (ムゲン魂): Takeru's final form accessed from the Mugen (ムゲン; Infinite) Eyecon, which is powered by his friends' emotions, that grants photokinesis and the ability to perform enhanced versions of the Gan Gun Saber's finishers. His finisher in this form is the God Omega Drive (ゴッドオメガドライブ, Goddo Omega Doraibu).

Takeru Tenkūji is portrayed by Shun Nishime (西銘 駿, Nishime Shun). As a child, Takeru is portrayed by Hinata Yamada (山田 日向, Yamada Hinata).

=== Akari Tsukimura ===
Akari Tsukimura (月村 アカリ, Tsukimura Akari) is Takeru's childhood friend, college student, and physics major who wishes to be a successful scientist like her teachers. A rationally-minded young woman, she experiences difficulty in believing anything related to the supernatural and strives to find logical explanations despite learning of what happened to Takeru and assisting in reviving him. Along the way, she develops "Shiranui" (不知火) spray, which allows her to temporarily see Takeru as Kamen Rider Ghost and Gamma without an Eyecon. After finding a piece of a Gamma Eyecon, she is able to weaponize the Shiranui spray and use it to defend herself against Gamma. Following the Gammisers' defeat and Takeru's resurrection, she assists him in finishing his education.

Akari Tsukimura is portrayed by Hikaru Ohsawa (大沢 ひかる, Ōsawa Hikaru). As a child, Akari is portrayed by Chinami Yoshioka (吉岡 千波, Yoshioka Chinami).

=== Makoto Fukami ===
Makoto Fukami (深海 マコト, Fukami Makoto), original name Riyon (リヨン), is an artificial human created by Danton before his father Daigo spirited him and his sister Kanon to the human world and raised them until their mother died. 10 years prior to the series, Daigo left Makoto and Kanon at Daitenkū-ji, where the young Fukamis befriended Takeru and were transported to Gamma World as a result of Chikara Saionji's machinations. After meeting Alia and Alain, Kanon's body died, leaving her soul trapped in a Gamma Eyecon. Seeking to revive her, Makoto obtained the means to become Kamen Rider Specter (仮面ライダースペクター, Kamen Raidā Supekutā), joined forces with Saionji and Alain, and returned to the human world to find 15 Eyecons, clashing with Takeru in the process. After Takeru gathers the 15 Eyecons and uses his wish to revive Kanon, Makoto vows to help revive him and leaves Kanon in Takeru and his allies' care while he returns to Gamma World to regain his body with Javel's help. Following the Gammisers' defeat, Makoto and Kanon help Alain reform Gamma World.

During the events of the film Kamen Rider Ghost the Movie: The 100 Eyecons and Ghost's Fated Moment and the V-Cinema Ghost Re:Birth: Kamen Rider Specter, Makoto encounters and reconciles with Daigo upon learning of the latter's reasons for leaving him and Kanon as well as learns of his origins before stopping Danton from destroying Gamma World.

Utilizing the Specter (スペクター, Supekutā) Eyecon in conjunction with the Ghost Driver, Makoto can transform into Kamen Rider Specter. While transformed, he gains superhuman speed and can perform his own version of the Omega Drive. He also wields the Gan Gun Hand (ガンガンハンド, Gan Gan Hando; Eye Gun Hand), which like the Gan Gun Saber can be reconfigured into varying forms, such as its club-like Rod Mode (ロッドモード, Roddo Mōdo) for performing the Omega Smash (オメガスマッシュ, Omega Sumasshu) finisher. His personal vehicle is the Machine Hoodie (マシンフーディー, Mashin Fūdī) motorcycle, which contains Houdini's Hoodie Ghost instead of its eponymous Eyecon. Additionally, Makoto possesses the following evolutions of his Rider form:

- Kamen Rider Necrom Specter (仮面ライダーネクロムスペクター, Kamen Raidā Nekuromu Supekutā): An upgrade form accessed from the Necrom Eyecon that increases the capabilities of Makoto's default form at the cost of his free will.
- Kamen Rider Deep Specter (仮面ライダーディープスペクター, Kamen Raidā Dīpu Supekutā): Makoto's final form accessed from the Deep Specter (ディープスペクター, Dīpu Supekutā) Eyecon, which is powered by the Gammisers, that allows him to enhance any of his preexisting Damashii and grants the use of the Gekikou Mode (ゲキコウモード, Gekikō Mōdo; Enraged Mode) ability to generate a pair of energy wings. While transformed, he wields the Deep Slasher (ディープスラッシャー, Dīpu Surassha), which similar to the Sunglasseslasher has a Sword Mode for performing the (Giga) Omega Giri ((ギガ) オメガギリ; (Giga) Omega Slash) finisher and a Blaster Mode for performing the (Giga) Omega Dama ((ギガ) オメガダマ; (Giga) Omega Ball) finisher. However, unless Makoto uses the Deep Specter Eyecon's power for righteousness, this form will render him uncontrollable. His finisher in this form is the Giga Omega Drive (ギガオメガドライブ, Giga Omega Doraibu).
- Kamen Rider Sin Specter (仮面ライダーシンスペクター, Kamen Raidā Shin Supekutā): A special form accessed from the Sin Specter (シンスペクター, Shin Supekutā) Eyecon, which is powered by Makoto's sins, that grants umbrakinesis and the ability to perform enhanced versions of the Gan Gun Hand and Deep Slasher's finishers. His finisher in this form is the Deadly Omega Drive (デッドリーオメガドライブ, Deddorī Omega Doraibu). This form appears exclusively in the V-Cinema Kamen Rider Ghost Re:Birth: Kamen Rider Specter.

Makoto Fukami is portrayed by Ryosuke Yamamoto (山本 涼介, Yamamoto Ryōsuke). As a child, Makoto is portrayed by Renma Taga (多賀 蓮真, Taga Renma).

=== Alain ===
Alain (アラン, Aran) is the son of Gamma emperor, Adonis, who seeks the Eyecons to examine their power and follows a twisted form of justice. He initially assists his family in combating Takeru and Makoto until Alain is framed for his father's apparent death. Unaware of his brother, Adel's, treachery, Alain attempts to take the throne from him while trying to adjust to life in the human world. Due to being rescued by Takeru and Makoto several times, Alain became honor-bound to help them. Upon learning that Adonis is alive, but trapped in his mortal body, Alain searches for him, learning the reason why he and the Gammas are immortal and learning more about Takeru along the way. After Adonis sacrifices himself to save him, Alain promises to carry out his father's will by saving the human and Gamma worlds, though he is temporarily unable to continue fighting until Makoto helps him come to terms with Adonis' death, vowing to defeat Adel himself. Following the Gammisers' defeat and the end of the Demia Project, Alain is pardoned and returns to his homeworld to help restructure the Gamma world's society with Makoto and his sister Kanon's help.

As of the crossover film Kamen Rider Heisei Generations: Dr. Pac-Man vs. Ex-Aid & Ghost with Legend Rider and the V-Cinema Ghost Re-Birth: Kamen Rider Specter, Alain has married Kanon.

Utilizing the Necrom (ネクロム, Nekuromu) Eyecon, which allows him to brainwash Ghost Driver users, in conjunction with the Mega Ulorder (メガウルオウダー, Mega Uruōdā) bracelet, Alain can transform into Kamen Rider Necrom (仮面ライダーネクロム, Kamen Raidā Nekuromu). While transformed, he can control others' minds, turn intangible, transfer his consciousness to another Gamma's body and transform it into his own, and perform an Omega Ulord (オメガウルオウド, Omega Uruōdo) finisher known as the Necrom Destroy (ネクロムデストロイ, Nekuromu Desutoroi), though he is vulnerable to electricity-based attacks. Due to the Necrom Eyecon being a prototype, Alain is forced to absorb other Gamma to sustain his Rider energy and is unable to lose his temper lest the Eyecon destroys his body. Later in the series, he acquires the Gan Gun Catcher (ガンガンキャッチャー, Gan Gan Kyatchā; Eye Gun Catcher), which similar to the Gan Gun Hand has a Rod Mode for performing the Omega Crash (オメガクラッシュ, Omega Kurasshu) finisher and a Gun Mode for performing the Omega Finish (オメガフィニッシュ, Omega Finisshu) finisher.

During the events of the V-Cinema Kamen Rider Ghost Re:Birth: Kamen Rider Specter, Alain acquires the Yujou Burst (友情バースト, Yūjō Bāsuto; Friendship Burst) Eyecon, which is powered by his bonds with his friends and allows him to assume his final form; Yujou Burst Damashii (友情バースト魂, Yūjō Bāsuto Damashī). His finisher in this form is the Burst Omega Drive (バーストオメガドライブ, Bāsuto Omega Doraibu).

Alain is portrayed by Hayato Isomura (磯村 勇斗, Isomura Hayato). As a child, Alain is portrayed by Yūsei Itō (伊藤 悠成, Itō Yūsei).

== Recurring characters ==
=== Hoodie Ghosts ===
The Hoodie Ghosts (パーカーゴースト, Pākā Gōsuto), also known as Heroic Ghosts (英雄ゴースト, Eiyū Gōsuto), are hoodie-like spiritual entities who embody the spirits of historical figures. After being unlocked from an object tied to them, said figures later inhabit their respective Eyecons and can be summoned to augment their users with their powers. As they are sentient beings in their own right, they can also move around within their personal Eyecons and refuse cooperation with any user they deem unworthy.

==== 15 heroic Eyecons ====
The main 15 heroic Eyecons are a numbered group of Hoodie Ghosts who Ryū Tenkūji carefully selected to serve as an antithesis to the Gammisers under Edith's suggestions. By gathering them around the monolith, they have the ability to summon the Great Eye from the Planet Gamma to grant the wish of a Ghost Driver user. Although most of them are primarily used by Kamen Rider Ghost, especially to invoke Grateful Damashii, others are also used by Kamen Riders Specter and Necrom.

The 15 heroic Eyecons' spirits are voiced by Tomokazu Seki (関 智一, Seki Tomokazu) in their Hoodie Ghost forms.

- 01. Musashi Damashii (ムサシ魂): A red-colored form used by Ghost that grants proficiency in sword fighting. In this form, he primarily wields the Gan Gun Saber in its two-piece Nitouryu Mode (二刀流モード, Nitōryū Mōdo; Two Sword Style Mode), which allows him to perform the Omega Slash (オメガスラッシュ, Omega Surasshu) finisher. In his original human body, Musashi is portrayed by Mitsuru Karahashi (唐橋 充, Karahashi Mitsuru).
- 02. Edison Damashii (エジソン魂, Ejison Damashii): A yellow-colored form used by Ghost that grants electrokinesis. In this form, he primarily wields the Gan Gun Saber in Gun Mode (ガンモード, Gan Mōdo), which allows him to perform the Omega Shoot (オメガシュート, Omega Shūto) finisher. It is also shared with Specter on several occasions, allowing him to use the Gan Gun Hand as an electroshock weapon. In his original human body, Edison is portrayed by Chad Mullane (チャド・マレーン, Chado Marēn) of the owarai duo Chad Mullane.
- 03. Robin Damashii (ロビン魂): A green-colored form used by Ghost that grants proficiency in archery. In this form, he combines the Gan Gun Saber and the Condor Denwor (コンドルデンワー, Kondoru Denwā; Condor Telephone) device to access the former's bow-like Arrow Mode (アローモード, Aro Mōdo), which allows him to perform the Omega Strike (オメガストライク, Omega Sutoraiku) finisher. In his original human body, Robin Hood is portrayed by Naoki Komatsu (小松 直樹, Komatsu Naoki).
- 04. Newton Damashii (ニュートン魂, Nyūton Damashii): A blue-colored form used by Ghost that equips him with the gyrokinetic Repulsion Glove (リパルショングローブ, Riparushon Gurōbu) and Attraction Glove (アトラクショングローブ, Atorakushon Gurōbu) gauntlets. This form first appears in the film Kamen Rider Drive: Surprise Future.
- 05. Beethoven Damashii (ベートーベン魂, Bētōben Damashii): A black/white/gray-colored form used by Ghost that grants sonokinesis. In his original human body, Beethoven is portrayed by Show Ayanocozey (綾小路 翔, Ayanokōji Shō) of Kishidan.
- 06. Billy the Kid Damashii (ビリー・ザ・キッド魂, Birī Za Kiddo Damashii): A brown-colored form used by Ghost that grants proficiency in sharpshooting. In this form, he can either combine the Gan Gun Saber and the Bat Clock (バットクロック, Batto Kurokku) device to access the former's Rifle Mode (ライフルモード, Raifuru Mōdo), which allows him to perform the Omega Impact (オメガインパクト, Omega Inpakuto) finisher, or dual wield them in their Gun Modes.
- 07. Benkei Damashii (ベンケイ魂): A white-colored form used by Ghost that grants superhuman strength. In this form, he combines the Gan Gun Saber and the Kumo Lantern (クモランタン, Kumo Rantan; Spider Lantern) device to access the former's Hammer Mode (ハンマーモード, Hanmā Mōdo), which allows him to perform the Omega Bomber (オメガボンバー, Omega Bonbā) finisher. In his original human body, Benkei is portrayed by Kenji Tominaga (富永 研司, Tominaga Kenji).
- 08. Goemon Damashii (ゴエモン魂): A light green-colored form used by Ghost that grants proficiency in ninjutsu. In his original human body, Goemon is portrayed by Ami 201 (阿見 201, Ami Niimaruichi) of the owarai duo Dekobokodan.
- 09. Ryoma Damashii (リョウマ魂, Ryōma Damashii): A blue/black/gold/white-colored form used by Ghost that grants ergokinesis and the use of propulsive force. In his original human body, Ryoma is portrayed by TV Asahi announcer Taihei Katō (加藤 泰平, Katō Taihei).
- 10. Himiko Damashii (ヒミコ魂): A pink-colored form used by Ghost that grants spell casting capabilities. In her original human body, Himiko is portrayed by Yuka Hirata (平田 裕香, Hirata Yuka).
- 11. Tutankhamun Damashii (ツタンカーメン魂, Tsutankāmen Damashii): A turquoise/gold-colored form used by Specter that grants proficiency in melee combat. In this form, he combines the Gan Gun Hand and the Cobra Keitai (コブラケータイ, Kobura Kētai) (Note: "Keitai" is derived from "mobile phone" (携帯電話, Keitai denwa).) device to access the former's Sickle Mode (鎌モード, Kama Mōdo), which allows him to perform the Omega Fang (オメガファング, Omega Fangu) finisher.
- 12. Nobunaga Damashii (ノブナガ魂): A violet/gold-colored form used by Specter that grants proficiency in ranged combat. In this form, he primarily wields the Gan Gun Hand in its rifle-like Gun Mode (銃モード, Jū Mōdo), which allows him to perform the Omega Spark (オメガスパーク, Omega Supāku) finisher. In his original human body, Nobunaga is portrayed by Kenji Takechi (武智 健二, Takechi Kenji).
- 13. Houdini Damashii (フーディーニ魂, Fūdīni Damashii): An indigo-colored form used by Specter that fuses him with the Machine Hoodie to grant flight and teleportation capabilities. He can also separate himself from and reconfigure the Machine Hoodie into its alternate hoverboard-like Glider Mode (グライダーモード, Guraidā Mōdo) for him to ride into battle. In his original human body, Houdini is portrayed by Jeremy Eaton (ジャーミー・イートン, Jāmī Īton).
- 14. Grimm Damashii (グリム魂, Gurimu Damashii): A dark green-colored form used by Necrom that equips him with the twin shoulder-mounted extendable G Pen (Gペン, Jī Pen) nibs. Unlike the other Hoodie Ghosts, the Grimm Hoodie Ghost manifests as two separate spirits representing Jacob and Wilhelm Grimm before fusing with each other to empower Necrom. When used by a Gamma Superior, it grants the ability to cast illusions.
- 15. Sanzo Damashii (サンゾウ魂, Sanzō Damashii): An old gold-colored form used by Necrom that grants the use of familiars based on Sanzo's companions Sun Wukong, Zhu Bajie, and Sha Wujing for combat assistance. In this form, he wields the Gokourin (ゴコウリン, Gokōrin) wind and fire wheel.

==== Legend Eyecons ====
- 45. 1 Damashii (1号魂, Ichigō Damashii): A Kamen Rider 1-themed form used by Ghost that grants superhuman athleticism. This form appears exclusively in the DVD-exclusive final episode of the web series Kamen Rider Ghost: Legendary! Riders' Souls!.
- 45. Heisei Damashii (平成魂): A namesake-themed form used by Ghost that grants the combined powers of his 16 Heisei Kamen Rider predecessors. This form appears exclusively in the DVD-exclusive final episode of the web series Kamen Rider Ghost: Legendary! Riders' Souls!.
- R11. W Damashii (ダブル魂, Daburu Damashii): A Kamen Rider W-themed form used by Specter that grants aerokinesis and increased leg strength. In this form, he wields the Metal Shaft. This form appears exclusively in the web series Kamen Rider Ghost: Legendary! Riders' Souls! and the crossover film Kamen Rider 1.
- R12. OOO Damashii (オーズ魂, Ōzu Damashii): A Kamen Rider OOO-themed form used by Specter that grants the ability to manifest the Tora Claws. In this form, he wields the Medajaribur. This form appears exclusively in the web series Kamen Rider Ghost: Legendary! Riders' Souls! and the crossover film Kamen Rider 1.
- R13. Fourze Damashii (フォーゼ魂, Fōze Damashii): A Kamen Rider Fourze-themed form used by Specter that grants the ability to manifest the Fourze Modules. This form appears exclusively in the web series Kamen Rider Ghost: Legendary! Riders' Souls! and the crossover film Kamen Rider 1.
- R14. Wizard Damashii (ウィザード魂, Wizādo Damashii): A Kamen Rider Wizard-themed form used by Ghost that grants the ability to cast spells based on the Wizard Rings. In this form, he wields the WizarSwordGun. This form appears exclusively in the web series Kamen Rider Ghost: Legendary! Riders' Souls! and the crossover film Kamen Rider 1.
- R15. Gaim Damashii (鎧武魂, Gaimu Damashii): A Kamen Rider Gaim-themed form used by Ghost that grants the ability to generate fruit-like force fields. In this form, he wields the Musou Saber and Daidaimaru. This form appears exclusively in the web series Kamen Rider Ghost: Legendary! Riders' Souls! and the crossover film Kamen Rider 1.
- R16. Drive Damashii (ドライブ魂, Doraibu Damashii): A Kamen Rider Drive-themed form used by Ghost that grants superhuman speed. In this form, he wields the Handle-Ken and Door-Ju. This form appears exclusively in the web series Kamen Rider Ghost: Legendary! Riders' Souls! and the crossover film Kamen Rider 1.
- R18. Ex-Aid Damashii (エグゼイド魂, Eguzeido Damashii): A Kamen Rider Ex-Aid-themed form used by Ghost that grants superhuman jumping. This form appears exclusively in the crossover film Kamen Rider Heisei Generations: Dr. Pac-Man vs. Ex-Aid & Ghost with Legend Rider.

==== Other Eyecons ====
- Ikkyū Damashii (一休魂): A cyan-colored form used by Ghost that allows him to access mental abilities through zen meditation. This form appears exclusively in the Hyper Battle DVD special Kamen Rider Ghost: Ikkyu Intimacy! Awaken, My Quick Wit Power!!.
- Pythagoras Damashii (ピタゴラス魂, Pitagorasu Damashii): A white/gold-colored form used by Specter that allows him to weaponize the Pythagorean theorem in the form of energy attacks. This form appears exclusively in the Hyper Battle DVD special Kamen Rider Ghost: Ikkyu Intimacy! Awaken, My Quick Wit Power!!.
- Napoleon Damashii (ナポレオン魂, Naporeon Damashii): A blue-colored form used by Dark Ghost that clads him in the Valiant Coat (ヴァリアントコート, Varianto Kōto), which increases his fighting capabilities to put him on par with Ghost's Toucon Boost Damashii.
- Darwin Damashii (ダーウィン魂, Dāwin Damashii): An orange-colored form used by Ghost that allows him to manipulate the flow of evolution. This form appears exclusively in the film Kamen Rider Ghost the Movie: The 100 Eyecons and Ghost's Fated Moment. In his original human body, Darwin is portrayed by Ian Moore (イアン・ムーア, Ian Mūa).
- Tenka Touitsu Damashii (テンカトウイツ魂, Tenka Tōitsu Damashii): A gold-colored form used by Ghost that grants the combined powers of Oda Nobunaga, Toyotomi Hideyoshi, and Tokugawa Ieyasu's spirits. In this form, he can wield Specter and Necrom's weapons alongside his own. This form appears exclusively in the crossover film Kamen Rider Heisei Generations: Dr. Pac-Man vs. Ex-Aid & Ghost with Legend Rider.
- Shinsengumi Damashii (シンセングミ魂): A blue/green-colored form used by Ghost that grants the combined powers of Kondō Isami, Hijikata Toshizō, and Okita Sōji's spirits. This form appears exclusively in the stage show Kamen Rider Ghost: Final Stage & Program Cast Talk Show.

=== Daitenkū-ji ===
Daitenkū-ji (大天空寺; Great Sky Temple) is a fictional Buddhist temple that has been in the Tenkūji family's care for generations and serves as the home and base of operations for the series' main characters.

==== Onari ====
Onari Yamanouchi (山ノ内 御成, Yamanouchi Onari) is a Buddhist monk and current caretaker of Daitenkū-ji due to Takeru being too young to do so who openly expresses his frustrations and is open to believing in the supernatural, but lacks the spiritual awareness to see Gamma without Akari's Shiranui spray or Takeru's Kumo Lantern. Over the course of the series and assisting in Takeru's fight against the Gamma, Onari develops an inferiority complex, believing himself to be a nuisance to the fight and desiring to provide better support.

As revealed in the tie-in novel Novel: Kamen Rider Ghost: Memories to the Future, Onari was an aspiring Mohawk guitarist who encountered Ryū after being saved from a Gamma Assault who arrived on Earth for reconnaissance purposes, eventually taking up the role of Daitenkū-ji's monk out of respect to his rescuer. At some point after the Great Eyeser's defeat, Onari left to establish his own private investigation service after getting into an argument with Javel, which also results in the former jumping into the crossfire between the Kamen Riders and Bi-Kaiser. After the battle, Onari returns to Daitenkū-ji, reconciles with Javel once the two settle their differences, and resumes his position as the acting chief priest.

Onari Yamanouchi is portrayed by Takayuki Yanagi (柳 喬之, Yanagi Takayuki).

==== Shibuya ====
Shibuya Hachiōji (八王子 シブヤ, Hachiōji Shibuya) is an ascetic monk training at Daitenkū-ji who is prone to jumping to conclusions that cause more harm than good and assigned to investigate paranormal phenomena alongside Narita Kisarazu. (Note: His name references Shibuya and Hachiōji, both of which being cities in Tokyo.) Outside of his work, Shibuya has a troubled relationship with his mother, Miho, who nags him for not being more like his father, Tetsuya, who died sometime after Shibuya was born. Despite this, Shibuya still cares for his mother and eventually reconciles with her.

Shibuya Hachiōji is portrayed by Takuya Mizoguchi (溝口 琢矢, Mizoguchi Takuya), who also portrays Tetsuya. As a child, Shibuya is portrayed by Naito Yoshida (吉田 騎士, Yoshida Naito).

==== Narita ====
Narita Kisarazu (木更津 ナリタ, Kisarazu Narita) is a laid-back ascetic monk training at Daitenkū-ji who is assigned to investigate paranormal phenomena alongside Shibuya Hachiōji. (Note: His name references Narita and Kisarazu, both of which being cities in Chiba Prefecture.)

Narita Kisarazu is portrayed by Reo Kansyuji (勧修寺 玲旺, Kanshūji Reo).

==== Edith ====
Edith (イーディス, Īdisu) is a magistrate of the Gamma World and Adonis' closest ally who proposed the idea of a machine capable of granting immortality by transferring their people's souls into Eyecons. While Adonis used the Great Eye's power to complete Edith's machine, the latter was shocked to discover that it was slowly killing their people instead. When Adonis launched an invasion on the human world to power the machine, Edith attempted to contact the Great Eye, but was stopped by the Gammisers, which he created to protect it. A decade prior to the series, Edith was defeated by and joined forces with Ryū Tenkūji and Daigo Fukami to stop the Gamma, developing Ghost Drivers and heroic Eyecons for future use.

In the present, in response to Ryū's son Takeru's death by a Gamma, Edith is forced to modify the former's plan by infusing Takeru's soul into an Eyecon, giving him a Ghost Driver, and tasking him with collecting the heroic Eyecons with the promise of reviving him. Taking on the alias of a playful and mysterious hermit (仙人, sennin), Edith takes up residence in Daitenkū-ji's basement to watch over Takeru and his friends while occasionally and secretly returning to Gamma World to oversee the Gammas' progress. After Adonis' son Adel succeeds him and threatens the Gamma, Edith is forced to reveal his true colors while dragging the Gamma emperor to Earth to prevent him from harnessing the Great Eye's power and saving Takeru and Adel's brother Alain from the Perfect Gammiser. With his secret exposed and following Adel and the Gammisers' defeat, Edith remains in Daitenkū-ji and takes over Ryū's former position as Daitenkū-ji's head priest.

Utilizing a personal Gamma Ultima Eyecon, Edith can transform into Gamma Ultima Ebony (眼魔ウルティマ・エボニー, Ganma Urutima Ebonī), a jet-black variant of the original Gamma Ultima form. During Takeru and his allies' final battle with Adel and the Gammisers, Edith temporarily transforms into Kamen Rider Dark Ghost to maintain the portal connecting the human and Gamma worlds and attempt to join the fight before Yurusen pulled him out due to his old age.

Edith is portrayed by Naoto Takenaka (竹中 直人, Takenaka Naoto).

==== Yurusen ====
Yurusen (ユルセン) is Edith's pet cat who manifests as a sentient ghostly sprite to serve as his familiar and assistant to Takeru.

Yurusen is voiced by Aoi Yūki (悠木 碧, Yūki Aoi).

==== Ryū Tenkūji ====
Ryū Tenkūji (天空寺 龍, Tenkūji Ryū) is Takeru's father and the previous caretaker of Daitenkū-ji. 10 years prior to the series, the former left on a ghost hunting expedition with his friends Chikara Saionji and Kenjirō Igarashi to research the monolith underneath Daitenkū-ji. Along the way, Ryū discovered an Eyecon and the Gammas. To prevent a war between Gamma World and his own, Ryū was forced to involve Takeru after sensing his potential for bringing peace between the two worlds. After Saionji sent Makoto and Kanon Fukami to Gamma World, Ryū leads a failed expedition to save them. Five years later, Ryū arranged for Takeru to receive the Ore Eyecon, which the former hoped would contain his soul and allow Takeru to fight Gammas in a duplicate body. After being killed by Adel however, Ryū was forced to adjust his plans. In the present, the latter gives up his soul to power the Toucon Boost Eyecon and buy Takeru time to revive himself.

In the tie-in novel Novel: Kamen Rider Ghost: Memories to the Future, it is revealed Ryū is the previous holder of Kamen Rider Ghost's mantle, having previously assumed a red-colored version called Kamen Rider Zero Ghost (仮面ライダーゼロゴースト, Kamen Raidā Zero Gōsuto) and fought the invading Gamma with the spirit of Miyamoto Musashi by his side and using the Gan Gun Saber's Nitouryu Mode as his weapon of choice. Having spent his final days fighting the invading Gamma forces, Ryū fought a young Adel before he was summoned by Saionji. Despite winning the fight with Musashi's help, Ryū was killed soon after when Adel transferred his spirit to a backup Eyecon. In addition, Ryū also joined forces with the younger Takeru and Ayumu in defeating Great Demia's clone during its attempt to prevent the young Tenkūji's birth in the past.

Ryū Tenkūji is portrayed by Kazuhiko Nishimura (西村 和彦, Nishimura Kazuhiko).

=== Gamma ===
The Gamma (眼魔（ガンマ), Ganma; lit. "Eye Demon") are extra-dimensional creatures that appear as ghosts in the physical world and are descended from humans who migrated from Earth to the Gamma World during the Yayoi period and lived peacefully. Though they founded an empire, the Gamma World was eventually devastated by environmental pollution associated with the rapid development of science and technology. When their ruler Adonis fell into despair after his wife Alicia and firstborn son Argos, among others of their kind, were claimed by a plague, he sought to use the Great Eye's power to wish for a world without death in what would be called the Demia Project (デミアプロジェクト, Demia Purojekuto), with his closest ally Edith overseeing it. Over time, Adonis and Edith developed a means of using the Great Eye's power to preserve Gamma World populace's bodies in stasis capsules while their souls are transferred into Eyecons that use nanotechnology to project facsimiles of their original bodies. However, the life support system required a great amount of energy to be maintained and several Gamma World residents began to die as such.

To compensate for this defect, Adonis' son Adel and Gamma scientist Igor suggested invading the human world, to which Adonis reluctantly agreed until he saw how his actions endangered the human world's inhabitants. This would lead to Adel overthrowing his father and being manipulated by the Gammisers for their own ends. Following Adel and the Gammisers' demise, the Great Eye's departure, the Demia Project being shut down, and peace being restored to the Gamma World, Alain returns to rebuild Gamma World's society.

Each Gamma possesses a Gamma Eyecon (眼魔眼魂, Ganma Aikon) that it can fuse with an object in the human world to help them transform from their Primal Body (素体, Sotai) into a more powerful form. From weakest to strongest, Gamma subspecies include Gamma Assaults (眼魔アサルト, Ganma Asaruto), who primarily serve as foot soldiers; Gamma Commandos (眼魔コマンド, Ganma Komando), whose Eyecons lack the energy needed to become more powerful and the majority of which were formerly humans before Igor developed technology capable of converting human souls into Gamma; Gamma Superiors (眼魔スペリオル, Ganma Superioru), who can assume human appearances with special Gamma Eyecons; and Gamma Ultimas (眼魔ウルティマ, Ganma Urutima), members of the Gamma World's royal family as well as promoted Gamma Superiors. Gamma Ultimas in particular are also capable of empowering themselves further via external methods, such as being possessed by a Gammiser, and become Gamma Ultima Fire (眼魔ウルティマ・ファイヤー, Ganma Urutima Faiyā). Gammas who absorb wild Hoodie Ghosts or constructs can transform further into a monstrous Giant Gamma (巨大眼魔, Kyodai Ganma), though they can be reverted back if they are separated from the Hoodie Ghost or construct. Similarly to the Hoodie Ghosts, Gammas can also use their Eyecons to possess living humans.

==== Javel ====
Javel (ジャベル, Jaberu) is a Gamma Superior loyal to Adel who sees Alain as foolish, though he allows Adonis to send him to support Alain in collecting the 15 heroic Eyecons. Despite being destroyed by Kamen Riders Ghost and Specter on separate occasions, Javel is able to use Igor's technology to resurrect himself. After Adel overthrows Adonis, Javel is promoted to Gamma Ultima and tasked with eliminating Alain, but is defeated by Kamen Rider Ghost Grateful Damashii despite being possessed by Gammiser Fire and transformed into a Gamma Ultima Fire. When Igor reveals he is no longer needed, Javel goes rogue and makes a final attempt at killing his enemies, only to discover he is dying of starvation due to reverting to his mortal body, which he hasn't done in years. Onari saves his life, causing Javel to realize the error of his ways and joins forces with Ghost, Specter, and their allies, though he initially maintains his mission to kill Alain until the Gamma prince defeats Javel in combat and the Gamma sees how Alain has changed. With Onari's encouragement, Javel changes his mission to learning more about the human world's environment. Amidst the Great Eyeser's attack, Javel sacrifices himself to save Alain, but Ghost destroys the Great Eyeser, reviving Javel in the process. Following this, Javel chooses to stay at Daitenkū-ji.

In combat, Javel possesses superhuman speed and can produce energy waves from his palms.

Javel is portrayed by Sotaro (聡太郎, Sōtarō).

==== Adel ====
Adel (アデル, Aderu) is Alain's older brother and the second-highest authority in the Gamma World next to his father, Adonis. After convincing his father to invade the human world, Adel secretly works to xenoform Earth by killing Ryū Tenkūji to stop him from interfering and sending Alain to retrieve the 15 heroic Eyecons. Eventually deeming Adonis too weak to follow through on the invasion, Adel destroys his Eyecon, imprisons him, and frames Alain for regicide while he assumes Gamma World's throne. However, he is unknowingly manipulated by the Gammisers into allowing them to merge with him to become the Perfect Gammiser (パーフェクト・ガンマイザー, Pāfekuto Ganmaizā) and influence him into seeking out the Great Eye's power. Following a failed attempt at using the Demia Project to turn everyone in Gamma World and the human world into copies of himself, his sister Alia and Ryū's son Takeru help Adel realize the error of his ways and admit that he killed Ryū out of jealousy. The Gammisers attempt to take over his body, but Adel urges Takeru to kill him. Before departing to the afterlife, Adel thanks Takeru for saving him and expresses the hope that his siblings do not make the same mistakes that he did.

As a Gamma Ultima, Adel can disable projectiles and melt objects by touching them. As the Perfect Gammiser, he can produce tentacles capable of utilizing the Gammisers' powers and possesses power rivaling that of Ghost Grateful and Mugen Damashii.

Adel is portrayed by Akihiro Mayama (真山 明大, Mayama Akihiro). As a child, Adel is portrayed by Saion Ebizuka (海老塚 幸穏, Ebizuka Saion).

==== Igor ====
Igor (イゴール, Igōru) is a scientifically-minded and cold Gamma scientist who believes humans are inferior beings and works with Adel to invade the human world and use human souls to compensate for Edith's machine killing their people. After Edith went rogue, Igor assumed the former's position as Gamma World's magistrate. Amidst Adel's attempt to use the Demia Project to turn everyone in Gamma World and the human world into copies of himself, Igor is rescued by Akari and repays her by sacrificing himself to protect her from a mind-controlled Gamma. Following Kamen Rider Ghost's battle with the Great Eyeser, Igor awakens in his mortal body.

Unlike other Gamma, Igor possesses a unique Eyecon that allows him to transform into a Gamma Superior Perfect (眼魔スペリオル・パーフェクト, Ganma Superioru Pāfekuto) and the Proto-Mega Ulorder (プロトメガウルオウダー, Puroto Mega Uruōdā) bracelet that allows him to assume the forms of Gamma Combatants through the Gamma Change (眼魔チェンジ, Ganma Chenji) process.

Igor is portrayed by Hiroshi Yamamoto (山本 浩司, Yamamoto Hiroshi).

==== Alia ====
Alia (アリア, Aria) is Alain and Adel's older sister and a former caretaker for the Fukami siblings. After becoming aware of Adel's plot to overthrow their father Adonis, she is forced to play along until Alain can return with reinforcements. Upon Alain's return, she reveals what Adel has done and entrusts Takeru with taking care of Alain for her while she stays behind to hinder Adel's plans. However, her first attempt is thwarted by Gammisers Climate and Planet, who destroy her Gamma Eyecon and return her to her mortal body, allowing Adel to take her captive. Alain and his allies eventually free Alia, who helps Takeru return Adel to his senses. After the Gammisers fuse with the Great Eye, Alia elects to stay in Gamma World to protect it while Takeru, Alain, and their allies defeat the Gammisers.

Utilizing a pink-colored Necrom Eyecon in conjunction with the Proto-Mega Ulorder, Alia can transform into Kamen Rider Dark Necrom P (仮面ライダーダークネクロムP（ピンク）, Kamen Raidā Dāku Nekuromu Pinku).

Alia is portrayed by Reon Kadena (かでな れおん, Kadena Reon), who also portrays her mother Alicia. As a child, Alia is portrayed by Emiri (エミリ).

==== Adonis ====
Adonis (アドニス, Adonisu) is the emperor of the Gamma World and the father of Alain, Adel, Alia, and Argos who cares for his people and family. During the Yayoi period, as detailed in the tie-in novel Novel: Kamen Rider Ghost: Memories to the Future, Adonis led a group of people in migrating from Earth to Planet Gamma to protect them from a barbaric king. After losing his wife Alicia (アリシア, Arishia), firstborn child Argos, and many of his comrades, Adonis created the Demia Project to ensure immortality for the Gamma. Due to this, he was chosen by the Great Eye and used its power to realize his magistrate Edith's machine, which he developed to transfer the Gamma World's population's souls into Eyecons. However, the machine killed more of their people, which led to Adonis reluctantly approving his son Adel and scientist Igor's idea to invade the human world to solve the problem.

Over time, Adonis came to regret the innocent lives being taken, causing him to doubt his actions. Before he could call off the invasion, Adel destroyed his father's Gamma Eyecon, imprisoned, and framed Adonis' youngest son Alain for regicide. Alain and Takeru eventually free Adonis, who sacrifices himself to protect Alain from Adel's army. Dying in Alain's arms, Adonis reaffirms his love for him and tells him to listen to his heart in the hopes of stopping him from making the same mistakes that he did.

Adonis is portrayed by Hiroshi Katsuno (勝野 洋, Katsuno Hiroshi).

==== Gyro ====
Gyro (ジャイロ, Jairo) is Alain's combat instructor and Ryūrai's former subordinate who was tasked with protecting Adonis during their people's migration from the human world to the Gamma World. Amidst Adel's plot to use the Demia Project to turn everyone in the human world and Gamma World into copies of himself, Gyro fears Adel is going too far and mercilessly putting their people's life energies at risk, but is forced to obey him. Following the Gammisers' defeat, Gyro is freed of the Demia Project and awakens in his mortal body. However, during the events of the V-Cinema, Ghost Re:Birth: Kamen Rider Specter, Gyro is killed by Danton.

As a Gamma Ultima, Gyro possesses the unique ability to reverse time within his surroundings and carries a sword.

Gyro is portrayed by Seiji Takaiwa (高岩 成二, Takaiwa Seiji).

==== Gamma Combatants ====
Gamma Combatants are Gamma Assaults who empower themselves using objects closely tied to historical figures to gain clothing-like armaments and weapons, similarly to Kamen Riders Ghost, Specter, and Necrom, among others.

- Yari Gamma (槍眼魔, Yari Ganma): A Gamma Assault that fused with a Yari connected to Hozoin In'ei. He goes on a rampage with the Katana Gamma, during which they kill Takeru, who is later resurrected and granted the ability to become Kamen Rider Ghost. Using his newfound powers, Takeru kills the Yari Gamma. The Yari Gamma is voiced by Kousuke Takaguchi (高口 公介, Takaguchi Kōsuke).
- Katana Gamma (刀眼魔, Katana Ganma): A Gamma Assault who fused with a katana connected to Kojiro Sasaki. He goes on a rampage with the Yari Gamma before he is eventually killed by Kamen Rider Ghost Musashi Damashii. The Katana Gamma are voiced by Takahiro Fujiwara (藤原 貴弘, Fujiwara Takahiro) and Makoto Furukawa (古川 慎, Furukawa Makoto) respectively.
- Denki Gamma (電気眼魔, Denki Ganma): A Gamma Assault that fused with a radio receiver antenna connected to Nikola Tesla. He forces a scientist named Yoshinori Sonoda (園田 義則, Sonoda Yoshinori) to make an apparatus that will allow more Gamma to enter the human world. Using the device and the Edison Eyecon, the Electric Gamma transforms into a giant monster who wields a parabolic antenna-shaped cannon, but is killed by Kamen Rider Ghost Edison Damashii. The Denki Gamma is voiced by Yō Kitazawa (北沢 洋, Kitazawa Yō).
- Ono Gamma (斧眼魔, Ono Ganma): A Gamma Assault that fused with a hatchet connected to Juraj Janosik. He kidnaps a journalist named Mari Shirase (白瀬 マリ, Shirase Mari) to force her to reveal what she knows about shady art dealer Kōzō Kuratani (蔵谷 晃三, Kuratani Kōzō) and threaten to kill her unless he gets the Robin Eyecon, but is killed by Kamen Rider Ghost Robin Damashii. The Ono Gamma is voiced by Takuya Kirimoto (桐本 琢也, Kirimoto Takuya).
- Book Gamma (ブック眼魔, Bukku Ganma): A Gamma Assault that fused with a copy of Lewis Carroll's Alice's Adventures in Wonderland who possesses the ability to create near-identical duplicates of himself. He attempts to take a hostage in exchange for the Nobunaga Eyecon, but is killed by Kamen Rider Ghost Robin Damashii. The Book Gamma is voiced by Kiyohito Yoshikai (吉開 清人, Yoshikai Kiyohito).
- Machinegun Gamma (マシンガン眼魔, Mashingan Ganma): A Gamma Assault that fused with a fedora connected to Al Capone who possesses a machine gun-like arm. He attacks an empty elementary school, forces several city officials to do his bidding, and takes Akari and Onari hostage before he is killed by Kamen Rider Specter Tutankhamun Damashii. The Machinegun Gamma is voiced by Katsumi Chō (長 克巳, Chō Katsumi).
- Onpu Gamma (音符眼魔, Onpu Ganma): A Gamma Assault that fused with a jabot connected to Wolfgang Amadeus Mozart who is capable of producing concussive soundwaves, a cacophony of sound, and completely negating all sound within a 60-meter (200 ft) radius of himself. He haunts college student Kōsuke Kimishima (君島 康介, Kimishima Kōsuke), who wishes to make a masterpiece, in an attempt to draw out Beethoven's ghost, before he is killed by Kamen Rider Ghost Beethoven Damashii. Another Onpu Gamma serves under Igor while trying to create presentation music for the Demia Project's launch. After failing to gain Igor's attention, the Onpu Gamma runs way and befriends the Art Supplies Gamma, Kanon Fukami, and Daitenkū-ji's residents. The two Gammas later depart for a trip around the world to learn more about it together. Along the way, the Onpu and Art Supplies Gamma witness the Demia Project's effects, are brainwashed by Adel, and have their souls erased by the Great Eyeser before Kamen Rider Ghost kills it, undoing its effects. The Onpu Gamma is voiced by Norihisa Mori (森 訓久, Mori Norihisa).
- Insect Gamma (インセクト眼魔, Insekuto Ganma): A Gamma Assault that fused with a magnifying glass connected to Jean-Henri Fabre who can turn herself into a swarm of wasps. She is killed by Kamen Rider Ghost Billy the Kid Damashii. The Insect Gamma is voiced by Hitomi Nabatame (生天目 仁美, Nabatame Hitomi).
- Seiryuto Gamma (青竜刀眼魔, Seiryūtō Ganma): A Gamma Assault that fused with the Green Dragon Crescent Blade, the legendary polearm connected to Guan Yu, who wields the Maengetsu (魔偃月) spear and a dragon beard capable of breathing fire. He kidnaps Kenjirō Igarashi to lure out Benkei's spirit before he is killed by Kamen Rider Ghost Benkei Damashii. The Seiryuto Gamma is voiced by Tetsu Inada (稲田 徹, Inada Tetsu).
- Planet Gamma (プラネット眼魔, Puranetto Ganma): A Gamma Assault that fused with a space helmet connected to Yuri Gagarin who has the ability to hijack technological communication devices via a satellite and using them to steal a human's soul. He is killed by Kamen Rider Ghost Ryoma Damashii. The Planet Gamma is voiced by Yuuma Uchida (内田 雄馬, Uchida Yūma).
- Knife Gamma (ナイフ眼魔, Naifu Ganma): A Gamma Assault that fused with a pair of scissors connected to Jack the Ripper who dual wields a pair of blades that he can use to cut out a human's soul. He takes part in Igor's attack on the human world before the Knife Gamma is killed by Kamen Rider Ghost Himiko Damashii. The Knife Gamma voiced by Kōichi Sakaguchi (坂口 候一, Sakaguchi Kōichi).
- Gazai Gamma (画材眼魔, Gazai Ganma): A Gamma Assault that has fused with art supplies connected to Pablo Picasso who can turn his paintings into physical objects so long as the painting remains intact. Detesting violence, he is hunted by Igor and his fellow Gamma and tries to seek help from Kamen Rider Ghost. The Gazai Gamma later sacrifices himself to save Ghost from Necrom Specter and thanks the former for saving him from Igor and teaching him about friendship. After Ghost and Specter defeat Necrom however, the Gazai Gamma is mysteriously revived and transported to Daitenkū-ji, where he wholeheartedly helps his new friends, receives the nickname "Cubi" (キュビ, Kyubi) from Akari, and develops a friendly rivalry with Onari. Eventually the Gazai Gamma leaves the temple to travel the world with the Onpu Gamma. Amidst their travels, the two Gamma witness the Demia Project's effects, are brainwashed by Adel, and have their souls erased by the Great Eyeser before Kamen Rider Ghost kills it, undoing its effects. The Gazai Gamma is voiced by Taiki Matsuno (松野 太紀, Matsuno Taiki) while his human form is portrayed by his suit actor Jiro Uchikawa (内川 仁朗, Uchikawa Jirō).
- Katchu Gamma (甲冑眼魔, Katchū Ganma): A Gamma Assault that fused with a French sword that belonged to Joan of Arc who wields Schreiber (シュライバー, Shuraibā) sword and refuses to hurt women and children. She serves Igor by stealing innocent souls and hunting Kamen Rider Ghost and Specter's Eyecons. After being defeated by Kamen Rider Ghost and being freed from Igor's brainwashing, she repays him by freeing the souls she stole. In their rematch, Ghost destroys her, though she gracefully accepts this thanks him for a good battle. The Katchu Gamma is voiced by Naoko Kouda (幸田 直子, Kōda Naoko).
- Hikoki Gamma (Younger Brother) (飛行機眼魔（弟）, Hikōki Ganma (Otōto)): A Gamma Assault that fused with a pair of aviator goggles connected to Lothar von Richthofen before he is killed by Kamen Rider Necrom. The younger Hikoki Gamma is voiced by Atsushi Imaruoka (伊丸岡 篤, Imaruoka Atsushi).
- Hikoki Gamma (Older Brother) (飛行機眼魔（兄）, Hikōki Ganma (Ani)): A Gamma Assault that fused with a flying cap connected to Manfred von Richthofen before he is killed by Kamen Rider Ghost Grateful Damashii. The elder Hikoki Gamma is voiced by Atsushi Imaruoka.
- Hikoki Gamma Perfect (飛行機眼魔・パーフェクト, Hikōki Ganma Pāfekuto): A Gamma Assault that fused with a propeller. He serves Igor until he is killed by Kamen Rider Ghost Mugen Damashii. The Hikoki Gamma Perfect is voiced by Atsushi Imaruoka.

===== Other Gamma Combatants =====
- Sohei Gamma (Younger Brother) (僧兵眼魔（弟）, Sōhei Ganma (Otōto)): (Note: Credited as Bosan Gamma (坊さん眼魔, Bō-san Ganma).) A warrior monk-themed Gamma who contains the soul of Ninkan and appears exclusively in the Televi-Kun DVD specials Kamen Rider Ghost: Ikkyu Eyecon Contention! Quick Wit Battle!! and Kamen Rider Ghost: Ikkyu Intimacy! Awaken, My Quick Wit Power!! He is killed by Kamen Rider Ghost. The younger Sohei Gamma is voiced by Hirofumi Tanaka (田中 大文, Tanaka Hirofumi).
- Sohei Gamma (Older Brother) (僧兵眼魔（兄）, Sōhei Ganma (Ani)): A warrior monk-themed Gamma who contains the soul of Shōkaku, wields a Yari, and appears exclusively in the Televi-Kun DVD specials Kamen Rider Ghost: Ikkyu Eyecon Contention! Quick Wit Battle!! and Kamen Rider Ghost: Ikkyu Intimacy! Awaken, My Quick Wit Power!!. He is killed by Kamen Riders Ghost Ikkyu Damashii and Specter Pythagoras Damashii. The elder Sohei Gamma is also voiced by Hirofumi Tanaka.

==== Gammisers ====
The Gammisers (ガンマイザー, Ganmaizā) are the Gamma World's pantheon who started out as an adaptable security system developed by Edith to prevent the Great Eye's power from being misused before attaining sentience and preventing him from fixing the flaws in his life preservation technology. Seeking to use the Great Eye's power to wipe out humanity, the Gammisers manipulate Adel into serving their needs and help them better understand emotions. After Kamen Rider Ghost destroys four of them, the remaining members convince Adel to let them fuse with him to grant him increased power until Adel realizes the error of his ways and allows him to be killed to prevent the Gammisers from achieving their goals. They merge with the Great Eye to become the Great Eyeser (グレートアイザー, Gurēto Aizā) and later a giant soul-erasing monster called the Eyeser Giant (アイザージャイアント, Aizā Jaianto), only to be killed by Kamen Rider Ghost.

The Gammisers are capable of assuming human forms that resemble Adel, absorbing human souls and assuming their forms, possessing, transforming, and/or fusing with Gamma Ultimas, regenerating from injuries, reviving themselves, analyzing enemy capabilities and preparing countermeasures against them, and preventing the 15 heroic Eyecons from coming together, though they are vulnerable to and can be permanently destroyed by Kamen Rider Ghost Mugen Damashii. While in their human forms, they can levitate, produce energy beams from their palms, and use their hands as makeshift swords.

- Gammiser Fire (ガンマイザー・ファイヤー, Ganmaizā Faiyā): A Gammiser who possesses pyrokinesis. During its first encounter with Ghost, it possesses Javel and transforms him into a Gamma Ultima Fire, but is ultimately defeated by Kamen Rider Ghost Grateful Damashii. In its second encounter with the Rider, Gammiser Fire absorbs Gammiser Gravity to increase its power, but they are destroyed by Kamen Rider Ghost Mugen Damashii.
- Gammiser Time (ガンマイザー・タイム, Ganmaizā Taimu): A Gammiser who possesses chronokinesis and the ability to counter Tutankhamun Damashii.
- Gammiser Gravity (ガンマイザー・グラヴィティ, Ganmaizā Guraviti): A Gammiser who possesses gyrokinesis and the ability to awaken dormant Gamma Holes. After successfully stealing most of the Kamen Riders' equipment, Gammiser Gravity fuses with Gammiser Fire, but they are destroyed by Kamen Rider Ghost Mugen Damashii.
- Gammiser Liquid (ガンマイザー・リキッド, Ganmaizā Rikiddo): A Gammiser who possesses hydrokinesis, self-duplication capabilities, and the ability to convert a Gamma Superior into copies of its fellow Gammisers.
- Gammiser Wind (ガンマイザー・ウィンド, Ganmaizā Windo): A Gammiser who possesses aerokinesis.
- Gammiser Blade (ガンマイザー・ブレード, Ganmaizā Burēdo): A Gammiser who possesses the ability to assume a sword-like form, which can split further into two swords, and counter Musashi Damashii. It fuses with Gammiser Magnetic to foil Alia's attempt to rebel against Adel, but they are destroyed by Kamen Rider Ghost Mugen Damashii.
- Gammiser Electric (ガンマイザー・エレクトリック, Ganmaizā Erekutorikku): A Gammiser who possesses electrokinesis and the ability to counter Edison Damashii.
- Gammiser Arrow (ガンマイザー・アロー, Ganmaizā Arō): A Gammiser who possesses the ability to assume a phoenix-like bow form and counter Robin Damashii.
- Gammiser Rifle (ガンマイザー・ライフル, Ganmaizā Raifuru): A Gammiser who possesses the ability to assume a bat-like rifle form and counter Billy the Kid Damashii.
- Gammiser Climate (ガンマイザー・クライメット, Ganmaizā Kuraimetto): A Gammiser who possesses atmokinesis and the ability to counter Grimm Damashii. It joins Gammiser Planet in thwarting Alia's attempt to rebel against Adel before the Gammisers are destroyed by Kamen Rider Ghost Mugen Damashii.
- Gammiser Oscillation (ガンマイザー・オシレーション, Ganmaizā Oshirēshon): A Gammiser who possesses sonokinesis and the ability to counter Beethoven Damashii.
- Gammiser Magnetic (ガンマイザー・マグネティック, Ganmaizā Magunetikku): A Gammiser who possesses magnokinesis and the ability to counter Houdini Damashii. It fuses with Gammiser Blade to foil Alia's attempt to rebel Adel, but they are destroyed by Kamen Rider Ghost Mugen Damashii.
- Gammiser Hammer (ガンマイザー・ハンマー, Ganmaizā Hanmā): A Gammiser who possesses the ability to assume a spider-like war hammer form and counter Benkei Damashii.
- Gammiser Spear (ガンマイザー・スピアー, Ganmaizā Supiā): A Gammiser who possesses the ability to assume a cobra-like spear form and counter Goemon Damashii.
- Gammiser Planet (ガンマイザー・プラネット, Ganmaizā Puranetto): A Gammiser who possesses geokinesis and the ability to counter Ryoma Damashii. It joins Gammiser Climate in thwarting Alia's attempt to rebel against Adel before the Gammisers are destroyed by Kamen Rider Ghost Mugen Damashii.

The Gammisers are voiced by Sayaka Ohara (大原 さやか, Ōhara Sayaka), who also voices Takeru's mother in episodes 32 and 42–46, and by Akihiro Mayama, who also portrays their human forms, from episodes 34 to 46. As Great Eyezer, they are co-voiced by Yūi Fujimaki (藤巻 勇威, Fujimaki Yūi).

=== Kanon Fukami ===
Kanon Fukami (深海 カノン, Fukami Kanon), original name Mion (ミオン), is an artificial human created by Danton and Makoto's younger sister whose soul was trapped in a Gamma Eyecon called the "Little Sister Eyecon" (妹眼魂, Imōto Aikon) following the siblings' accidental transportation to Gamma World 10 years prior to the series. In the present, Makoto works to revive her until Takeru wishes to do so. Following this, she continues to support her brother and Takeru in their battles against the Gamma and Gammisers throughout the series before helping Makoto and Alain reform Gamma World in the series finale. As of the V-Cinema Ghost Re:Birth: Kamen Rider Specter, Kanon has married Alain and become the empress of Gamma World. During the events of the web series Kamen Rider Specter × Blades, she has obtained the means to transform into Kamen Rider Kanon Specter (仮面ライダーカノンスペクター, Kamen Raidā Kanon Supekutā).

Kanon Fukami is portrayed by Mio Kudo (工藤 美桜, Kudō Mio). As a child, Kanon is portrayed by Yui Segizawa (堰沢 結衣, Segizawa Yui).

=== Chikara Saionji ===
Chikara Saionji (西園寺 主税, Saionji Chikara), previously referred to as a mysterious man (謎の男, nazo no otoko), is an archaeologist and former colleague of Ryū Tenkūji and Kenjirō Igarashi's who aided them in their Gamma studies a decade prior to the series before betraying them to use the Fukami siblings as guinea pigs to help him enter the Gamma World. While Saionji expressed regret for his treachery, he believed Ryū's hope for a better future was misplaced as the former planned to use the Gamma he summoned to his world for his own agenda.

After acquiring five heroic Eyecons as of the present as part of his plans, he waits for Kamen Riders Ghost and Specter to collect the remaining 10 before stealing them with the intention of using the monolith underneath Daitenkū-ji to demand the power to take over the world. Due to not possessing a Ghost Driver however, he is killed by the monolith's power.

In the "Hyper Battle DVD" special Kamen Rider Ghost: Truth! The Secret of Heroes' Eyecons!, Saionji is resurrected through a Gamma Eyecon and manipulates the Da Vinci Gamma to fight the Kamen Riders until he abandons his goal upon realizing Ryū still considered him a friend in spite of the former's jealousy. In the V-Cinema Ghost Re:Birth: Kamen Rider Specter, Saionji sacrifices himself to save Kanon from Danton.

Chikara Saionji is portrayed by Yoshiyuki Morishita (森下 能幸, Morishita Yoshiyuki).

=== Steve Bills ===
Steve Bills (スティーブ・ビルズ, Sutību Biruzu) is the CEO of the network company Deep Connect (ディープコネクト, Dīpu Konekuto) who Igor possessed as part of Adel's vision for the Demia Project. Using Bills, Igor buys out the former's corporate rivals to expand his influence and hide the Gamma's plans. After Kamen Rider Ghost and his allies infiltrate Deep Connect, Igor and Bills stage a Gamma attack to clear the latter of any suspicions, but their secret is exposed regardless while Onari, Shibuya Hachiōji, Narita Kisarazu, and Alain rescue Bills from Igor's control. Following this, the CEO willingly takes responsibility for what Igor and Adel did while using him.

Steve Bills is portrayed by Thane Camus (セイン・カミュ, Sein Kamyu).

=== Great Eye ===
Ganuma (ガヌマ), or the "Great Eye" (グレートアイ, Gurēto Ai) as Adonis referred to it as, is an omnipotent being and the collective consciousness of intelligent extraterrestrial lifeforms who evolved past the need for physical bodies. When Adonis and his people first arrived to the Gamma World, the Great Eye chose Adonis to receive its power as he became emperor. However, a plague claimed the lives of Adonis' wife and first-born son, which inspired Edith to use the Great Eye's power to develop Eyecon technology, a machine capable of granting their people immortality, and the Gammisers to protect the Great Eye. When the machine claimed more lives due to the Gammisers preventing Edith from fixing a flaw in it, Edith created 15 Eyecons based on 15 heroic historical figures to bring the Great Eye to Earth.

In the present, Chikara Saionji and Adel attempt to harness the Great Eye's power, but it kills the former while Takeru, who the Great Eye developed an interest in, Edith, and Adonis interfere with Adel's plot. The Gammisers later manipulate Adel into using the Demia Project to take control of the Great Eye and use its power to bring everyone under the Demia Project under his control before fusing with the Great Eye to transform into the Great Eyeser, but they are destroyed by Takeru, freeing the Great Eye. After it revives Takeru, the Great Eye ends the Demia Project and leaves Earth.

The Great Eye is voiced by Yūi Fujimaki (藤巻 勇威, Fujimaki Yūi).

==== Freyja and Freyr ====
Freyja (フレイヤ, Fureiya) is an avatar of the Great Eye who first appears during the events of the web series Kamen Rider Ghost: Legendary! Riders' Souls! to prepare Kamen Riders Ghost and Specter for the Dark Mind. To facilitate her plot, she splits herself in two, with one half becoming Freyr (フレイ, Furei), who steals Ghost and Specter's Eyecons and summons the fallen enemies of past Kamen Riders to challenge them while Freyja herself helps Ghost and Specter collect the Legend Rider Eyecons before she and Freyr were absorbed by Xibalba. After being freed, Freyja reveals the purpose behind her actions before absorbing Freyr and taking her leave.

Amidst the Gammisers' plot to manipulate Adel into helping them take the Great Eye's power for themselves, Freyja and Freyr return to reveal their true nature, the Great Eye's interest in Takeru, and warn him of the Gammisers' threat. Following the Gammisers' defeat, Freyja visits Takeru one more time before leaving Earth with the Great Eye.

Freyja and Freyr are both portrayed by Ryo Ogawa (小川 涼, Ogawa Ryō).

== Guest characters ==
- Yasushi Onodera (小野寺 靖, Onodera Yasushi): The local mailman who serves Daitenkū-ji and helps Takeru find Eyecons. Yasushi Onodera is portrayed by Yasuomi Sano (佐野 泰臣, Sano Yasuomi).
- Kenjirō Igarashi (五十嵐 健次郎, Igarashi Kenjirō): A physicist and Ryū Tenkūji's associate in studying the Eyecons and Gamma who sought to save Makoto and Kanon from Gamma World, but was unsuccessful due to Ryū's death and protecting Takeru 10 years prior to the series. As a result of this and learning his colleague Chikara Saionji had betrayed him and Ryū, Igarashi became traumatized and anti-social and was forced to go on the run from Saionji and the Gammas. In the present, Takeru finds Igarashi and helps reignite his desire to save the Fukami siblings. Months later, Igarashi has recovered from his trauma and learns of the Fukami siblings' safe return. Before he departs, he gives Akari his journal and acknowledges her courage as a scientist. Kenjirō Igarashi is portrayed by Moro Morooka (モロ師岡).
- Fumi Fukushima (福嶋 フミ, Fukushima Fumi): An old woman and the first owner of the Fūmin (フーミン) takoyaki shop who has known Takeru, Akari, and the Fukami siblings since they were children. After he becomes a fugitive of his empire, Fumi helps Alain acclimate to the human world until she dies peacefully in her sleep. Fumi Fukushima is portrayed by Hisako Ohkata (大方 斐紗子, Ōkata Hisako). As a child, Fumi is portrayed Momone Shinokawa (篠川 桃音, Shinokawa Momone).
- Yamaarashi-Roid (ヤマアラシロイド, Yamaarashi Roido): A revived porcupine-themed cyborg from the Badan Empire who works for Shocker and can use his weaponized quills to trap people and as projectile weapons. He is destroyed by Kamen Rider Ghost and Zyuoh Eagle. Yamaarashi-Roid is voiced by Hidenari Ugaki (宇垣 秀成, Ugaki Hidenari).
- Yamato Kazakiri (風切 大和, Kazakiri Yamato): A young zoologist and the leader of the Zyuohgers who can transform into Zyuoh Eagle (ジュウオウイーグル, Jūō Īguru), among other forms. He assists Takeru in protecting the fugitive Alain and destroying Yamaarashi-Roid. Yamato Kazakiri is portrayed by Masaki Nakao (中尾 暢樹, Nakao Masaki), who reprises his role from Doubutsu Sentai Zyuohger.
- Harumi Fukushima (福嶋 ハルミ, Fukushima Harumi): Fumi's granddaughter who takes over Fūmin following her death. Harumi Fukushima is portrayed by Kaya Hioki (日置 かや, Hioki Kaya), who also portrays a younger Fumi.
- Kamen Rider Ex-Aid (仮面ライダーエグゼイド, Kamen Raidā Eguzeido): A master gamer and surgical intern who battles the Bugsters to save his patients. First appearing in the film Kamen Rider Ghost the Movie: The 100 Eyecons and Ghost's Fated Moment, he assists Takeru in fighting the Dark Necroms. In the series finale, Ex-Aid helps protect Ayumu from Kamen Rider Gemn. Kamen Rider Ex-Aid is voiced by Hiroki Iijima (飯島 寛騎, Iijima Hiroki), ahead of his appearance in his self-titled TV series.
- Ayumu Tenkūji (天空寺 アユム, Tenkūji Ayumu): (Note: Credited simply as Ayumu (アユム), with his real name being confirmed in the tie-in novel..) Takeru and Chloe's son from the future who was born with the Great Eye's leftover power when Takeru resurrected his mother. Throughout the series finale, the stage show Kamen Rider Ghost: Final Stage, and the tie-in novel Novel: Kamen Rider Ghost: Memories to the Future, when Takeru seemingly died from the Great Demia's attack, Ayumu jumps into the past in the hopes of learning what kind of person Takeru was in his youth, resulting in an encounter with Kamen Riders Gemn and Ex-Aid after stealing a Rider Gashat. After being reassured by his father in the past, Ayumu returns to his time to don the mantle of Kamen Rider Ghost. Demia tries to counter this by sending a clone of itself to prevent Ayumu's birth, but the boy follows it into the past as well and connects with Takeru and Ryū to defeat the clone. Returning to his time once more, Ayumu counters Demia's immortality by striking its core and freeing his father from the AI's bindings. Ayumu is portrayed by Shouta Ikoma (生駒 星汰, Ikoma Shōta).

== Spin-off characters ==
=== Da Vinci Gamma ===
The Da Vinci Gamma (ダヴィンチ眼魔, Da Vinchi Ganma) is a Mona Lisa/Vitruvian Man/aerial screw-themed Gamma Superior who contains the soul of his namesake. First appearing in the non-canonical crossover film Kamen Rider × Kamen Rider Ghost & Drive: Super Movie War Genesis, he sends Kamen Riders Ghost and Drive 10 years in the past so he can take over the present. After absorbing the Raphael and Michelangelo Gammas' power, the Da Vinci Gamma transforms into the giant Renaissance Gamma (ルネサンス眼魔, Runesansu Ganma), but is killed by Ghost and Drive. In the "Hyper Battle DVD" special Kamen Rider Ghost: Truth! The Secret of Heroes' Eyecons!, Chikara Saionji creates a second Da Vinci Gamma from a facsimile of the Mona Lisa and manipulates the latter into attacking Ghost for not choosing him to be one of the 15 Eyecons needed to revive him. After Ghost explains his reasoning and resonating with a reformed Saionji, the Da Vinci Gamma allows himself to be killed so his spirit can transform into an Eyecon.

In combat, the Da Vinci Gamma possesses the ability to produce an energy tornado, throw a plethora of Mona Lisa paintings at his enemies, and time travel capabilities.

The Da Vinci Gamma is voiced by Kendo Kobayashi (ケンドーコバヤシ, Kendō Kobayashi).

=== Raphael ===
The Raphael Gamma (ラファエロ眼魔, Rafaero Ganma) is a Portrait of Pietro Bembo/Sistine Madonna-themed Gamma Superior who contains the soul of his namesake, can fire feather-shaped energy bullets, and appears exclusively in the non-canonical crossover film Kamen Rider × Kamen Rider Ghost & Drive: Super Movie War Genesis. He and the Michelangelo Gamma attack Akari in 2005 until the Da Vinci Gamma brings the pair to the present so he can absorb them and transform into the Renaissance Gamma.

The Raphael Gamma is voiced by Jiro (じろう, Jirō) of the owarai duo Sissonne.

=== Michelangelo ===
The Michelangelo Gamma (ミケランジェロ眼魔, Mikeranjero Ganma) is a David/The Fall of Man-themed Gamma Superior who contains the soul of his namesake, possesses superhuman strength and a snake, and appears exclusively in the non-canonical crossover film Kamen Rider × Kamen Rider Ghost & Drive: Super Movie War Genesis. He and the Raphael Gamma attack Akari in 2005 until the Da Vinci Gamma brings the pair to the present so he can absorb them and transform into the Renaissance Gamma.

The Michelangelo Gamma is voiced by Shinobu Hasegawa (長谷川 忍, Hasegawa Shinobu) of the owarai duo Sissonne.

=== Xibalba ===
Xibalba (シバルバ, Shibaruba) is a mysterious Gamma Ultima who appears exclusively in the web series Kamen Rider Ghost: Legendary! Riders' Souls. He targets and absorbs the twins Freyr and Frejya to evolve into a Gamma Ultima Fire, only for Kamen Riders Ghost and Specter to revert him to his original form before they kill him.

Xibalba is voiced by Takaya Hashi (土師 孝也, Hashi Takaya).

=== Nova Shocker ===
Shocker Nova Co., Ltd. (ノバショッカー株式会社, Noba Shokkā Kabushiki-Gaisha) is a splinter faction of Ambassador Hell's branch of the terrorist organization Shocker who seeks to conquer the global economy and appears exclusively in the crossover film Kamen Rider 1. They attempt to steal power from Japan via the Nova Energy System (ノバエネルギーシステム, Noba Enerugī Shisutemu) and obtain the Alexander Eyecon, but the latter leads to Nova Shocker's leading members being killed by Alexander, Kamen Riders 1, Ghost, and Specter, and Ambassador Hell.

==== Wolga ====
Wolga (ウルガ, Uruga) is a hyena-themed cyborg monster, former member of Shocker, and founding member and leader of Nova Shocker. Following a cameo appearance in episode 24 of the series, he appears in the crossover film Kamen Rider 1, leading Nova Shocker in their quest to steal power from Japan and obtain the Alexander Eyecon, only to be possessed by the latter and destroyed by Kamen Riders Ghost, Specter, and 1. In the DVD-exclusive final episode of the web series Kamen Rider Ghost: Legendary! Riders' Souls!, Wolga is revived by the Alexander Eyecon and seeks revenge on Ghost and Specter, only to be destroyed once more by the former.

In combat, Wolga possesses electrokinesis, superhuman speed, and the ability to assume a human form.

Wolga is voiced by Eitoku (永徳) in the series, portrayed by Tsuyoshi Abe (阿部 力, Abe Tsuyoshi) in Kamen Rider 1, and voiced by Tsuguo Mogami (最上 嗣生, Mogami Tsuguo) in Legendary! Riders' Souls!

==== Eagla ====
Eagla (イーグラ, Īgura) is a cyborg monster, former member of Shocker, and executive member of Nova Shocker who wields a rapier and appears exclusively in the crossover film Kamen Rider 1. She assists Nova Shocker in their plot to steal power from Japan and obtain the Alexander Eyecon until she is killed by Wolga Alexander.

Eagla is portrayed by Nao Nagasawa (長澤 奈央, Nagasawa Nao).

==== Buffal ====
Buffal (バッファル, Baffaru) is a condor-themed cyborg monster, former member of Shocker, and executive member of Nova Shocker. First appearing in the crossover film Kamen Rider 1, he assists Nova Shocker in their plot to steal power from Japan and obtain the Alexander Eyecon until he is destroyed by Kamen Rider Ghost. In the DVD-exclusive final episode of the web series Kamen Rider Ghost: Legendary! Riders' Souls!, Buffal is revived by the Alexander Eyecon and seeks revenge on Ghost, only to be destroyed by him once more.

Buffal is portrayed by Kozo Takeda (武田 幸三, Takeda Kōzō) in Kamen Rider 1 and voiced by Tsuguo Mogami in Legendary! Riders' Souls!

=== Alexander ===
Alexander (アレクサンダー, Arekusandā) is a Gamma containing the soul of Alexander the Great who was trapped in a Gamma Eyecon and appears exclusively in the crossover film Kamen Rider 1. The Eyecon was originally in the possession of the Dark Mind, who gave it to Ambassador Hell of the terrorist organization Shocker, though the latter was unable to use its power. Following Ambassador Hell's death at Kamen Riders 1's hands in the 1970s, the Eyecon ended up in the hands of Tobei Tachibana's granddaughter, Mayu. This allowed Alexander to possess her and instigate a civil war between the revived Ambassador Hell's Shocker branch and the splinter faction Nova Shocker Co., Ltd. After Ambassador Hell's Shocker capture Mayu, Nova Shocker member Wolga obtains Alexander's Eyecon, who transforms him into Wolga Alexander (ウルガアレクサンダー, Uruga Arekusandā), kills Wolga's ally Eagla, and takes over his body and command of Nova Shocker. However, Kamen Riders Ghost and Specter weaken Wolga Alexander before Kamen Rider 1 kills him and Ambassador Hell destroys Alexander's Eyecon.

Sometime later, during the events of the DVD-exclusive final episode of the web series Kamen Rider Ghost: Legendary! Riders' Souls!, the Dark Mind recreates the Alexander Eyecon and turns him into Gamma Ultima Alexander (眼魔ウルティマ・アレクサンダー, Ganma Urutima Arekusandā), though the latter is destroyed by Kamen Rider Ghost.

Alexander is voiced by Shōzō Iizuka (飯塚 昭三, Iizuka Shōzō).

=== Dark Mind ===
The Dark Mind (闇の意志, Yami no Ishi) is the "manifestation of darkness" that resembles a Gamma Ultima. First appearing in the crossover film Kamen Rider 1, in which they are credited as Mysterious Gamma (謎の眼魔, Nazo no Ganma), they delivered the Alexander Eyecon to Ambassador Hell of the terrorist organization Shocker. During the events of the web series Kamen Rider Ghost: Legendary! Riders' Souls!, the Dark Mind recreates the Alexander Eyecon and transforms him into Gamma Ultima Alexander before personally battling Kamen Riders Ghost and Specter, only to be defeated by the former.

The Dark Mind is voiced by Kōji Ishii (石井 康嗣, Ishii Kōji) in Kamen Rider 1 and Shōzō Iizuka (飯塚 昭三, Iizuka Shōzō) in Legendary! Riders' Souls!

=== Daigo Fukami ===
Daigo Fukami (深海 大悟, Fukami Daigo), formerly known as Godai (ゴーダイ, Gōdai), was Danton's assistant who broke off from him and raised two artificial humans that the latter created, Makoto and Kanon, as his children. First appearing in the film Kamen Rider Ghost the Movie: The 100 Eyecons and Ghost's Fated Moment and after taking on a new name, Daigo left Makoto and Kanon at Daitenkū-ji following the death of his wife Naoko. However, Daigo was killed by Adel and resurfaced as a ghost with the ability to transform into Kamen Rider Zero Specter (仮面ライダーゼロスペクター, Kamen Raidā Zero Supekutā). In the present, Daigo encounters Makoto in Argos' world and reconciles with him upon telling him of what happened. In the novel Novel: Kamen Rider Ghost: Memories to the Future, it is revealed the Fukami family received their names from Ryū Tenkūji.

Daigo Fukami is portrayed by Ikki Sawamura (沢村 一樹, Sawamura Ikki).

=== Argos ===
Argos (アルゴス, Arugosu) is the kindly first born son of Adonis who died from plague and appears exclusively in the film Kamen Rider Ghost the Movie: The 100 Eyecons and Ghost's Fated Moment. He was resurrected as a Gamma and granted the ability to transform into Kamen Rider Dark Ghost (仮面ライダーダークゴースト, Kamen Raidā Dāku Gōsuto) by Edith and mentored by Daigo Fukami, but Argos' mind became warped and led to him betraying Edith and Daigo to collect 100 Eyecons and obtain the Extremer Driver (エクストリーマードライバー, Ekusutorīmā Doraibā) belt to convert all of the world's inhabitants into ghosts. In pursuit of his quest, he creates the Island of Eyecons (眼魂島, Aikon-jima) above Earth and populates it with several historical figures to lure in Kamen Riders Ghost, Specter, and Necrom and steal their Eyecons and use Ghost to complete the Extremer Driver. Upon capturing Ghost and collecting all 100 Eyecons he needs, Argos dons the Extremer Driver and transforms into Kamen Rider Extremer (仮面ライダーエクストリーマー, Kamen Rider Ekusutorīmā). However, Ghost frees himself and defeats Argos.

Utilizing the Dark (ダーク, Dāku) Eyecon in conjunction with the Ghost Driver, Argos can transform into Kamen Rider Dark Ghost. While transformed, he wields the Gan Gun Saber and Sunglasseslasher. He can also use other Eyecons to assume varying forms, such as Napoleon, Ikkyū, and Pythagoras Damashii. As Kamen Rider Extremer, Argos possesses the power of 100 historical figures' spirits and can remove his cloak to unfurl his multi-eyed Triscendence Wings (トライセンデンスウィング, Toraisendensu Uingu).

Argos is portrayed by Ryo Kimura (木村 了, Kimura Ryō). As a child, Argos is portrayed by Shōta Ishino (石野 湘太, Ishino Shōta).

=== Kamen Rider Dark Necroms ===
Kamen Rider Dark Necroms (仮面ライダーダークネクロム, Kamen Raidā Dāku Nekuromu) are three doppelgängers of Necrom who serve Argos, utilize differently colored Necrom Eyecons in conjunction with Proto-Mega Ulorders to transform, possess their own versions of the Machine Ghostriker and Iguana Ghostriker, can perform the Dark Necrom Spiral (ダークネクロム スパイラル, Dāku Nekuromu Supairaru) finisher, and appear exclusively in the film Kamen Rider Ghost the Movie: The 100 Eyecons and Ghost's Fated Moment.

- Jared (ジェレド, Jeredo): A servant of Argos' who can transform into the red-colored Kamen Rider Dark Necrom R (仮面ライダーダークネクロムR(レッド), Kamen Raidā Dāku Nekuromu Reddo) and is eventually killed by Kamen Rider Specter. Jared is portrayed by Hiroyuki Yasoshima (八十島 弘行, Yasoshima Hiroyuki) of the owarai duo 2700.
- Gevril (ジェビル, Jebiru): A servant of Argos' who can transform into the blue-colored Kamen Rider Dark Necrom B (仮面ライダーダークネクロムB(ブルー), Kamen Raidā Dāku Nekuromu Burū) and is eventually killed by Kamen Rider Ex-Aid. Gevril is portrayed by Tsune (ツネ) of the owarai duo 2700.
- Jay (ジェイ, Jei): A servant of Argos' who can transform into the yellow-colored Kamen Rider Dark Necrom Y (仮面ライダーダークネクロムY(イエロー), Kamen Raidā Dāku Nekuromu Ierō) and is eventually killed by Kamen Rider Necrom. Jay is portrayed by Yuko Takayama (高山 侑子, Takayama Yūko).

=== Danton ===
Danton (ダントン) is a cruel and immoral co-creator of Gamma World who appears exclusively in the V-Cinema Ghost Re:Birth: Kamen Rider Specter. Having worked alongside Adonis and Edith in colonizing Gamma World, Danton realized the Demia Project and the Gammisers were flawed and that the system Adonis developed around the Great Eye would collapse. This convinced Danton to take an alternative means to remodel their people, which Adonis disapproved of which led to a civil war that ended with Danton being placed in a Gamma Prison (眼魔牢獄, Ganma Rōgoku) and thrown into space many years prior before he eventually returns in the present. After killing Gyro and setting about creating a new world for the Gamma, Danton encounters one of his successful creations, Makoto, who initially accepts him before learning of his true intentions. Danton transforms into a monstrous form called Evolude (エヴォリュード, Evoryūdo), but is ultimately killed by Makoto.

Danton is portrayed by James Onoda (ジェームス小野田, Jēmusu Onoda).

=== Chloe ===
Chloe (クロエ, Kuroe) is Danton's non-biological daughter who came into his care prior to her mother's death, was modified by him due to her weak body, and first appears in the V-Cinema Ghost Re:Birth: Kamen Rider Specter. Taking Takeru's life advice to heart, Chloe travels to the human world to search for him during the events of the tie-in novel Novel: Kamen Rider Ghost: Memories to the Future, but a series of miscommunications causes her to be targeted by riot police. After saving him from a vehicular accident, Takeru sacrifices half of his life force and the Mugen Eyecon to resurrect her.

In the future, Chloe marries Takeru and has a son named Ayumu. After seeing her husband being assimilated by Demia, she is forced to lie to Ayumu out of fear that the Tenkūjis would fight each other as enemies. To her relief, Ayumu takes on the mantle of Ghost and successfully saves Takeru by killing Demia.

Chloe is portrayed by Aya Marsh (マーシュ彩, Māshu Aya).

=== Evil king ===
The unnamed evil king is an antagonist of the first chapter of the tie-in novel Novel: Kamen Rider Ghost: Memories to the Future. During the Yayoi period, the king maintained supremacy by raging wars on neighboring civilizations and refused a peace treaty with Adonis' faction. His actions led to Adonis migrating his people to the Gamma World for their protection and putting the events of Kamen Rider Ghost as a whole into motion.

=== Ryūrai ===
Ryūrai (リューライ) is the commander of Adonis' faction of people who would become Gamma who appears exclusively in the tie-in novel Novel: Kamen Rider Ghost: Memories to the Future. After fighting off the evil king who threatened the Gamma tribe, Ryūrai volunteered to stay on Earth while Adonis led their people to Planet Gamma to guard the monolith bridging the two worlds together from the evil king's forces. Having entrusted his underling Gyro to protect Adonis, Ryūrai buries the monolith under the land where the Daitenkū-ji Temple would be built on and survived by his descendants, the Tenkūji family.

=== Naoko Fukami ===
Naoko Fukami (深海 奈緒子, Fukami Naoko) is the cousin of Takeru's mother, Yuri, who became the young boy's caretaker while she was still alive. When Godai arrived on Earth, Naoko married him and agreed to adopt Makoto and Kanon as their own children. However, she died soon after from illness.

=== Demia ===
Demia (デミア) is the artificial intelligence of the Gamma faction which Igor developed during Adel's tenure as the ruler of Planet Gamma. Using the Deep Connect company as a medium, Demia is responsible for enslaving mankind on Earth for the Gammisers until the Great Eyeser is destroyed by Kamen Rider Ghost. In the tie-in novel Novel: Kamen Rider Ghost: Memories to the Future, Demia is revealed to have saved its server to a backup system prior to its destruction and transforms into Great Demia (グレートデミア, Gurēto Demia) to wage war against mankind years after the series ended. Demia defeats and absorbs Takeru into its body, which leads to Takeru's son Ayumu eventually inheriting the mantle of Kamen Rider Ghost. Demia attempts to send a clone of itself into the past to avert Ayumu's birth, but fails when three generations of Tenkūjis unite their powers. Ayumu would later destroy Demia's core to cancel its self-regenerating powers and destroy it, saving the assimilated Takeru in the process.

=== Robes, Muller, and Camille ===
Robes (ロベス, Robesu), Muller (マラー, Marā), and Camille (カミーユ, Kamīyu) are a Gamma Superior, a Gamma Ultima Ebony, and Gamma Superior Perfect respectively and remnants of Danton's followers who appear in the web series Kamen Rider Saber × Ghost and Kamen Rider Specter × Blades. They seek to use Makoto and Kanon to reach their goal of creating ultimate lifeforms, only for Robes, Muller, and Camille are killed by Kamen Riders Saber and Ghost, Sin Specter and Kanon Specter, and Blades, respectively.

Robes, Muller, and Camille are portrayed by Takashi Kitadai (北代 高士, Kitadai Takashi), Kosei Sakurada (桜田 航成, Sakurada Kōsei), and Terumi (輝海), respectively.
