= Hisanori Ōiwa =

Japanese actor (born 1978)

Hisanori Ōiwa (大岩 永徳, Ōiwa Hisanori) (born January 16, 1978), who goes by the stage name Eitoku (永徳), is a Japanese actor, stunt performer and suit actor from Yachiyo, Chiba Prefecture affiliated with Japan Action Enterprises. He has been cast in many leading roles in the Kamen Rider series. He has also been featured in other several commercials, such as one titled Evening Smile (暮らスマイル, Kurera Sumairu).

== Suit Actor Roles ==
=== Kamen Rider Series ===
Year	Title	Role
2004	Kamen Rider Blade	Peacock Undead, Undeads
2005	Kamen Rider Hibiki	Kwaidouji, Mushadouji, Midaredouji, Kamen Rider Hibiki, Kamen Rider Zanki
2005	Kamen Rider Hibiki & The Seven Senki	Kwaidouji, Kamen Rider Hibiki
2006	Kamen Rider Kabuto	Worms, Kamen Rider KickHopper, Kamen Rider Dark Kabuto
2006	Kamen Rider Kabuto: God Speed Love	Kamen Rider Hercus
2007	Kamen Rider Den-O	Kamen Rider Den-O Rod Form, Urataros
2007	Kamen Rider Den-O: I'm Born!	Kamen Rider Den-O Rod Form, Urataros
2008	Kamen Rider Kiva	Dogga, Kamen Rider Saga, Kamen Rider Dark Kiva, Kamen Rider Kiva, Fangire
2008	Kamen Rider Den-O & Kiva: Climax Deka	Kamen Rider Den-O Climax Form, Urataros
2008	Kamen Rider Kiva: King of the Castle in the Demon World	Kamen Rider Rey
2008	Saraba Kamen Rider Den-O: Final Countdown	Kamen Rider Den-O Rod Form, Urataros
2009	Kamen Rider Decade	Kamen Rider Diend, Kamen Rider Kiva, Kamen Rider Abyss, Kamen Rider Blade, Kamen Rider Faiz, Kamen Rider G3-X, Kamen Rider Den-O Rod Form, Urataros, Kamen Rider Zanki, Gurongi
2009	Cho Kamen Rider Den-O & Decade Neo Generations: The Onigashima Warship	Urataros, Kamen Rider Diend, Kamen Rider G3, Kamen Rider Decade
2009	Kamen Rider Decade: All Riders vs. Dai-Shocker	Kamen Rider Diend, Kamen Rider Kiva, Kamen Rider 2, Kamen Rider Amazon, Kamen Rider Stronger
2009	Net Edition Kamen Rider Decade: All Riders Super Spin-off	Kamen Rider Saga
2009	Kamen Rider W	Kamen Rider Accel
2009	Kamen Rider × Kamen Rider W & Decade: Movie War 2010	Kamen Rider Skull, Kamen Rider Diend
2010	Kamen Rider × Kamen Rider × Kamen Rider The Movie: Cho-Den-O Trilogy	Kamen Rider Diend, Urataros
2010	Kamen Rider W Forever: A to Z/The Gaia Memories of Fate	Kamen Rider Accel, Kamen Rider Skull
2010	Kamen Rider OOO	Ankh, Kamen Rider Birth
2010	Kamen Rider × Kamen Rider OOO & W Featuring Skull: Movie War Core	Kamen Rider Accel, Kamen Rider Skull, Ankh, Kamen Rider Birth
2011	OOO, Den-O, All Riders: Let's Go Kamen Riders	Kamen Rider Birth, Urataros, Ankh
2011	Kamen Rider OOO Wonderful : The Shogun and the 21 Core Medals	Kamen Rider Birth (Date)
2011	Kamen Rider Fourze	Kamen Rider Meteor
2011	Kamen Rider × Kamen Rider Fourze & OOO: Movie War Mega Max	Ankh, Kamen Rider Birth, Kamen Rider Aqua, Kamen Rider Meteor
2012	Kamen Rider × Super Sentai: Super Hero Taisen	Kamen Rider Meteor, Kamen Rider Birth, Urataros
2012	Kamen Rider Fourze the Movie: Everyone, Space Is Here!	Kamen Rider Meteor
2013	Kamen Rider Wizard in Magic Land	Kamen Rider Sorcerer
2013	Kamen Rider Gaim	Kamen Rider Baron
2013	Kamen Rider × Kamen Rider Gaim & Wizard: The Fateful Sengoku Movie Battle	Kamen Rider Baron
2014	Heisei Riders vs. Shōwa Riders: Kamen Rider Taisen feat. Super Sentai	Kamen Rider Baron
2014	Kamen Rider × Kamen Rider Drive & Gaim: Movie War Full Throttle	Kamen Rider Gaim, Kamen Rider Baron
2015	Super Hero Taisen GP: Kamen Rider 3	Kamen Rider 3
2015	Kamen Rider Ghost	Kamen Rider Necrom
2016	Kamen Rider Ex-Aid	Kamen Rider Snipe
2017	Kamen Rider Build	Kamen Rider Cross-Z
2018	Kamen Rider Zi-O	Kamen Rider Woz, Kamen Rider Cross-Z, Kamen Rider Diend, Another Fourze, Another Faiz, Another Wizard, Another OOO, Urataros, Deneb
2019	Kamen Rider Zero-One	Kamen Rider Jin, Kamen Rider Thouser, Kamen Rider Ark-Zero, Eifuku (Episode 33)
2020	Kamen Rider Saber	Kamen Rider Blades
2021	Kamen Rider Revice	Kamen Rider Vice, Kamen Rider Jack Revice
2022	Kamen Rider Geats	Kamen Rider Tycoon
2023	Kamen Rider Gotchard	Kamen Rider Gotchard
2024	Kamen Rider Gavv	Kamen Rider Vram
2025	Kamen Rider Zeztz	Kamen Rider Nox, Zero

=== Super Sentai Series ===
- Tokusou Sentai Dekaranger (2004–2005) - Deka Break
- Tokusou Sentai Dekaranger the Movie: Full Blast Action (2004) - Deka Break
- Engine Sentai Go-Onger (2008–2009) - Barbaric Machine Beasts
- Kaizoku Sentai Gokaiger (2011–2012) - Deka Break

=== V-Cinema ===
- Tokusou Sentai Dekaranger vs. Abaranger (2005) - Deka Break
- Mahou Sentai Magiranger vs. Dekaranger (2006) - Deka Break
- Chō Ninja Tai Inazuma! (2006) - Raiden
- GoGo Sentai Boukenger vs. Super Sentai (2007) - DekaBreak
- Kamen Rider Den-O: Singing, Dancing, Great Training!! (2007) - Urataros
- Kamen Rider Decade: Protect! The World of Televikun (2009) - Kamen Rider Diend
- Kamen Rider W: Donburi's α/Farewell Recipe of Love (2010) - Kamen Rider Accel
- Kamen Rider W Returns: Kamen Rider Accel (2011) - Kamen Rider Accel

== Non-suit Actor Roles ==
- Engine Sentai Go-Onger (2008–2009) - Officer B
- Kamen Rider G (2009) - The Man who fell from the terrace (Uncredited)
- Net Edition Kamen Rider Decade: All Riders Super Spin-off (2009) - Himself (Eitoku/8-kun)
- Kamen Rider W (2009–2010) - Gaia Memory Distributor
- Kamen Rider OOO (2010–2011) - Man in the background
- Net Movie: Kamen Rider × Super Sentai: Super Hero Taihen: Who Is the Culprit?! (2012) - Himself
- Kamen Rider Fourze the Net Edition: Everyone, Let's Go to Class! (2012) - Himself
- Tiger & Bunny the Live (2012) - Keith Goodman
