= Kamen Rider × Kamen Rider Fourze & OOO: Movie War Mega Max =

Japanese name
- Kanji: 仮面ライダー×仮面ライダー フォーゼ&オーズ MOVIE大戦MEGA MAX
Transcriptions
- Revised Hepburn: Kamen Raidā × Kamen Raidā Fōze Ando Ōzu Mūbī Taisen Mega Makkusu
- Directed by: Koichi Sakamoto
- Written by: Kazuki Nakashima (Kamen Rider Fourze, Movie War Mega Max); Yasuko Kobayashi (Kamen Rider OOO)
- Produced by: Ishimori Productions; Toei
- Starring: Sota Fukushi; Ryuki Takahashi; Fumika Shimizu; Erina Mano; Shu Watanabe; Ryosuke Miura; Riho Takada; Atsushi Arai
- Cinematography: Koji Kurata
- Edited by: Hiroshi Sunaga
- Music by: Shuhei Naruse; Kōtarō Nakagawa
- Production company: Toei
- Distributed by: Toei Co. Ltd
- Release date: December 10, 2011
- Running time: 95 minutes; 117 minutes (Director's Cut)
- Country: Japan
- Language: Japanese
- Box office: $16,458,957

Kamen Rider × Kamen Rider Fourze & OOO: Movie War Mega Max (仮面ライダー×仮面ライダー フォーゼ&オーズ MOVIE大戦MEGA MAX, Kamen Raidā × Kamen Raidā Fōze Ando Ōzu Mūbī Taisen Mega Makkusu) is a 2011 film in the Kamen Rider series that was directed by Koichi Sakamoto. It features the casts of Kamen Rider Fourze and Kamen Rider OOO, and opened in Japanese theaters on December 10, 2011.

Movie War Mega Max is divided into five parts: Beginning: Fight! Legendary Seven Riders (幕開け 戦え! 伝説の七人ライダー, Makuake Tatakae! Densetsu no Shichinin Raidā), which focuses on the first seven Kamen Riders (One, Two, V3, Riderman, X, Amazon, and Stronger); Kamen Rider OOO: Ankh's Resurrection, the Medals of the Future, and the Leading Hope (仮面ライダーオーズ アンク復活と未来のメダルとつながる希望, Kamen Raidā Ōzu Anku Fukkatsu to Mirai no Medaru to Tsunagaru Kibou); Fuuto, the Conspiracy Advances: Gallant! Kamen Rider Joker (風都 暗躍する陰謀 颯爽! 仮面ライダージョーカー, Fūto Anyaku suru Inbō Sassō! Kamen Raidā Jōkā); Kamen Rider Fourze: Nadeshi-Ko De-Scend (仮面ライダーフォーゼ 撫・子・降・臨, Kamen Raidā Fōze Nadeshi Ko Kō Rin), in which the cast of Kamen Rider Fourze encounter and protect a strange girl that Gentaro Kisaragi falls in love with from the Horoscopes and Foundation X's Super Evolved Lifeform Mutamits (超進化生命ミュータミット, Chō Shinka Seimei Myūtamitto); and Movie War Mega Max: Gather! Warriors of Glory (MOVIE大戦MEGA MAX 集結せよ! 栄光の戦士たち, Mūbi Taisen Mega Makkusu Shūketsuseyo! Eikō no Senshi-tachi), where Foundation X's Lem Kannagi goes rogue to achieve world domination.

== Plot ==
=== Beginning: Fight! Legendary Seven Riders ===
Meteorites carrying a mysterious substance called SOLU fall to Earth. The original seven Kamen Riders – One, Two, V3, Riderman, X, Amazon, and Stronger – battle Foundation X's monsters around the world, but fail to stop the organization from retrieving the SOLU.

=== OOO: Ankh's Resurrection, the Medals of the Future, and the Leading Hope ===
As one of the meteorites causes a time portal to open over Japan, Kamen Rider Poseidon emerges from 40 years in the future to fight the present day Kamen Riders. Kougami Foundation employee Erika Satonaka informs her friend Hina Izumi of the event while they head to the airport to pick up Eiji Hino. Hino rescues them from attacking monsters, but Poseidon attacks him before Satonaka's partners Akira Date and Shintaro Goto arrive to fight the mysterious Rider. Poseidon overpowers them as Hino reveals himself to be a resurrected Ankh while pulling several Core Medals out of Poseidon's body just as the real Hino arrives and weakens the enemy, though Poseidon escapes.

With Date and Goto hospitalized, Hino, Ankh, Izumi, and Satonaka regroup at the restaurant Cous Coussier, where Ankh refuses to explain how he was revived while Hino theorizes Poseidon might not be acting of his own free will. More monsters attack, forcing Hino and Ankh to fight them while Izumi and Chiyoko Shiraishi evacuate the restaurant. Poseidon returns and nearly kills Hino, but the person inside the armor stops the former and reveals he is Michal Minato, a heroic Kamen Rider from the future whose aquaphobia led to him being corrupted by several dozen Core Medals that emerged from a black hole and created Poseidon. Ankh retrieves more Core Medals from him before Poseidon separates himself from Minato in an attempt to travel to another time period, though he is destroyed by Hino and Minato. After Minato leaves, Izumi notices that Ankh disappeared. Hino reveals that the Ankh that fought with them also came from the future. Before they can leave, Lem Kannagi attacks them and steals Poseidon's personal Core Medals.

=== Fuuto, The Conspiracy Advances: Gallant! Kamen Rider Joker ===
In the city of Fuuto, Shotaro Hidari stops a Foundation X convoy and destroys the monsters guarding it, though he causes the SOLU they were carrying to leak into a sewer. Meanwhile, Kannagi and his aides arrive at a secret airport to board his mobile spaceship lab, Exodus. The original seven Riders arrive to stop him, but Kannagi captures them.

=== Fourze: Nadeshi-Ko De-Scend ===
During Amanogawa High School's cultural festival, the Kamen Rider Club puts on a presentation celebrating past Kamen Riders when a mysterious girl falls from the sky. Club member Gentaro Kisaragi saves her before joining the club in taking her to the hospital, where they learn her name is Nadeshiko Misaki before Dustards attempt to kidnap her. As Kisaragi transforms into Kamen Rider Fourze to stop them, Misaki transforms into Kamen Rider Nadeshiko. Soon after, the Virgo Zodiarts arrives demanding Misaki, but Kisaragi and Misaki drive her off. Kisaragi's friend Kengo Utahoshi asks where Misaki's Rider powers came from, but she runs off with Kisaragi, who takes her to the club's lunar headquarters, the Rabbit Hatch, where they grow closer. When Misaki takes off her space helmet to kiss him, Kisaragi realizes she is not human.

Utahoshi reveals that she is one of several Seeds Of Life from the Universe, or "SOLU", an alien lifeform that mimics what it sees and lacks a true consciousness, and college scientists have apparently come to study her. Kisaragi refuses to accept this and storms off. His childhood friend Yuki Jojima cheers him up, but he refuses to let Misaki go and takes her away from the scientists. Misaki is touched by his feelings, but the scientists reveal themselves as Foundation X agents and kidnap her. Kisaragi pursues them, but Kannagi's aide Katal impedes him. Misaki and Kisaragi's ally Shun Daimonji join the fight when Foundation X reinforcements arrive. The trio defeats them, but Kannagi captures Misaki and turns her into a SOLU Switch before defeating Kisaragi and leaving him at Katal's mercy. Kisaragi uses an Astroswitch that Misaki created to destroy Katal. Soon after, Hino arrives to ask for Kisaragi's help in defeating Foundation X.

=== Movie War Mega Max: Gather! Warriors of Glory ===
Meeting up with Hidari and his partner Philip, Kisaragi and Hino learn that Kannagi betrayed Foundation X to achieve world domination. As Kannagi's forces confront the Riders, Hidari and Philip stay behind to hold them off and repay Hino for helping them during NEVER's attack on Fuuto (Note: As depicted in the film Kamen Rider W Forever: A to Z/The Gaia Memories of Fate.) while Hino and Kisaragi pursue Kannagi, finding and freeing the captive seven Riders on the way. As the seven Riders offer to stay behind and hold off Kannagi's forces, Minato returns to give Hino three Core Medals from his time to assist in the mission. Hino and Kisaragi reach the Exodus, where Kannagi uses Poseidon's Core Medals, the SOLU Switch, and the Gingaoh Driver to transform into Super Gingaoh and overpower the Riders. Hino and Kisaragi use the future Core Medals and Misaki's Astroswitch respectively, to fight Kannagi on equal footing before destroying him and the Exodus. Becoming an energy being, Misaki returns to space while the Riders return to Earth. As Hino resumes his journey to resurrect Ankh, Kisaragi encounters the real Misaki on his way back to school.

In a post-credits scene, Kamen Rider Meteor defeats Kannagi's forces' remnants before wondering whether he will find his target at Amanogawa High School.

== Production ==
Movie War Mega Max features the first seven Kamen Riders (One, Two, V3, Riderman, X, Amazon, and Stronger) to commemorate the franchise's 40th anniversary, as well as the return of Kamen Rider Double. Unlike previous Movie War films, which were divided into 3 segments, Movie War Mega Max is divided into 5 parts. Similarly to previous Movie War films, the secondary Kamen Rider of Kamen Rider Fourze, Kamen Rider Meteor, makes his debut in the film.

== Cast ==
Beginning cast

- Kamen Rider 1 (仮面ライダー1号, Kamen Raidā Ichigō; Voice): Tetsu Inada (稲田 徹, Inada Tetsu)
- Kamen Rider 2 (仮面ライダー2号, Kamen Raidā Nigō; Voice): Takahiro Fujimoto (藤本 たかひろ, Fujimoto Takahiro)
- Kamen Rider V3 (仮面ライダーV3, Kamen Raidā Bui Surī; Voice): Hirofumi Tanaka (田中 大文, Tanaka Hirofumi)
- Riderman (ライダーマン, Raidāman; Voice): Takayuki Masuda (増田 隆之, Masuda Takayuki)
- Kamen Rider X (仮面ライダーX, Kamen Raidā Ekkusu; Voice): Isshin Chiba (千葉 一伸, Chiba Isshin)
- Kamen Rider Amazon (仮面ライダーアマゾン, Kamen Raidā Amazon; Voice): Kōji Tobe (戸部 公爾, Tobe Kōji)
- Kamen Rider Stronger (仮面ライダーストロンガー, Kamen Raidā Sutorongā; Voice): Hideo Ishikawa (石川 英郎, Ishikawa Hideo)
- Katal (カタル, Kataru): Dante Carver (ダンテ・カーヴァー, Dante Kāvā)
- Solaris (ソラリス, Sorarisu): Sanae Hitomi (人見 早苗, Hitomi Sanae)
- Chancellor Kiima (キイマ総統官, Kiima-sōtōkan): Azusa Watanabe (渡辺 梓, Watanabe Azusa)
- Lem Kannagi (レム・カンナギ, Remu Kannagi): Toru Masuoka (益岡 徹, Masuoka Tōru)

OOO cast

- Eiji Hino (火野 映司, Hino Eiji): Shu Watanabe (渡部 秀, Watanabe Shū)
- Ankh (アンク, Anku): Ryosuke Miura (三浦 涼介, Miura Ryōsuke)
- Hina Izumi (泉 比奈, Izumi Hina): Riho Takada (高田 里穂, Takada Riho)
- Shintaro Goto (後藤 慎太郎, Gotō Shintarō): Asaya Kimijima (君嶋 麻耶, Kimijima Asaya)
- Akira Date (伊達 明, Date Akira): Hiroaki Iwanaga (岩永 洋昭, Iwanaga Hiroaki)
- Erika Satonaka (里中 エリカ, Satonaka Erika): Mayuko Arisue (有末 麻祐子, Arisue Mayuko)
- Chiyoko Shiraishi (白石 千世子, Shiraishi Chiyoko): Marie Kai (甲斐 まり恵, Kai Marie)
- Michal Minato (湊 ミハル, Minato Miharu): Atsushi Arai (荒井 敦史, Arai Atsushi)
- Kousei Kougami (鴻上 光生, Kōgami Kōsei): Takashi Ukaji (宇梶 剛士, Ukaji Takashi)
- Kamen Rider Poseidon (仮面ライダーポセイドン, Kamen Raidā Poseidon; Voice): Kenji Hamada (浜田 賢二, Hamada Kenji)
- O-Scanner Voice, Poseidon Driver Voice, Gingaoh Driver Voice: Akira Kushida (串田 アキラ, Kushida Akira)
- Birth Driver Voice: Jōji Nakata (中田 譲治, Nakata Jōji)

Futo, The Conspiracy Advances cast

- Shotaro Hidari (左 翔太郎, Hidari Shōtarō): Renn Kiriyama (桐山 漣, Kiriyama Ren)
- Philip (フィリップ, Firippu): Masaki Suda (菅田 将暉, Suda Masaki)
- Gaia Memory Voice: Fumihiko Tachiki (立木 文彦, Tachiki Fumihiko)

Fourze cast

- Gentaro Kisaragi (如月 弦太朗, Kisaragi Gentarō): Sota Fukushi (福士 蒼汰, Fukushi Sōta)
- Kengo Utahoshi (歌星 賢吾, Utahoshi Kengo): Ryuki Takahashi (高橋 龍輝, Takahashi Ryūki)
- Yuki Jojima (城島 ユウキ, Jōjima Yūki): Fumika Shimizu (清水 富美加, Shimizu Fumika)
- Miu Kazashiro (風城 美羽, Kazashiro Miu): Rikako Sakata (坂田 梨香子, Sakata Rikako)
- Shun Daimonji (大文字 隼, Daimonji Shun): Justin Tomimori (冨森 ジャスティン, Tomimori Jasutin)
- Tomoko Nozama (野座間 友子, Nozama Tomoko): Shiho (志保)
- JK (JK（ジェイク）, Jeiku): Shion Tsuchiya (土屋 シオン, Tsuchiya Shion)
- Chuta Ohsugi (大杉 忠太, Ōsugi Chūta): Takushi Tanaka (田中 卓志, Tanaka Takushi; of Ungirls)
- Ryusei Sakuta (朔田 流星, Sakuta Ryūsei): Ryo Yoshizawa (吉沢 亮, Yoshizawa Ryō)
- Nadeshiko (なでしこ, Nadeshiko), Nadeshiko Misaki (美咲 撫子, Misaki Nadeshiko): Erina Mano (真野 恵里菜, Mano Erina)
- Mituaki Gamou (我望 光明, Gamō Mitsuaki): Shingo Tsurumi (鶴見 辰吾, Tsurumi Shingo)
- Virgo Zodiarts (ヴァルゴ・ゾディアーツ, Varugo Zodiātsu; Voice): Rie Tanaka (田中 理恵, Tanaka Rie)

== Theme songs ==
Main film theme

- "SAMURAI STRONG STYLE"
  - Lyrics: Show Ayanocozey
  - Composition & Arrangement: Marty Friedman
  - Artist: Show Ayanocozey (綾小路 翔, Ayanokōji Shō) vs. Marty Friedman (マーティ・フリードマン, Māti Furīdoman)
  The movie's theme. Show Ayanocozey of Kishidan (a.k.a. DJ OZMA) and former Megadeth guitarist Marty Friedman recorded the Mega Max theme song "SAMURAI STRONG STYLE". Ayanocozey said that he had been a fan of the Kamen Rider Series when he was younger, having watched Super-1 and Black, and became envious that Koji Kikkawa had become involved in the Kamen Rider Series as a musician. To him, the meaning behind the song was the unique heroism that the Japanese idolize, and planned to style the song in the same way Ichirou Mizuki and Akira Kushida have done for their hero show theme songs. He has also stated his pleasure in collaborating with Friedman, as he was a fan of Megadeth in junior high. Friedman was pleased with his collaboration with Ayanocozey, having previously worked with him on a Fanta commercial campaign, and stated that the song has an ultimate manly feel to it. "SAMURAI STRONG STYLE" was released on December 21, 2011, alongside the film's soundtrack and the television series' soundtrack.

Insert songs

- "Anything Goes! OOO Special Edit."
  - Lyrics: Shoko Fujibayashi
  - Composition: tatsuo (of everset and Galveston 19)
  - Arrangement: tatsuo & Kōtarō Nakagawa
  - Artist: Maki Ohguro (大黒 摩季, Ōguro Maki) × Eiji Hino (Shu Watanabe)
- "Shout out"
  - Lyrics: Shoko Fujibayashi
  - Composition & Arrangement: Shuhei Naruse
  - Artist: Eiji Hino (Shu Watanabe)
  "Shout Out" makes its debut in the film, having never been used in the Kamen Rider OOO broadcast run.

== Reception ==
Kamen Rider × Kamen Rider Fourze & OOO: Movie War Mega Max grossed $16,458,957 at the box office.
