= Kamen Rider OOO Wonderful: The Shogun and the 21 Core Medals =

- Film poster for both Kamen Rider OOO Wonderful: The Shogun and the 21 Core Medals and Kaizoku Sentai Gokaiger the Movie: The Flying Ghost Ship

Japanese name
- Kanji: 劇場版 仮面ライダーオーズ WONDERFUL 将軍と21のコアメダル
Transcriptions
- Revised Hepburn: Gekijōban Kamen Raidā Ōzu Wandafuru Shōgun to Nijū-ichi no Koa Medaru
- Directed by: Takayuki Shibasaki
- Written by: Yasuko Kobayashi
- Based on: Kamen Rider OOO by Yasuko Kobayashi
- Produced by: Ishimori Productions; Toei
- Starring: Shu Watanabe; Ryosuke Miura; Riho Takada; Asaya Kimijima; Hiroaki Iwanaga; Ken Matsudaira; Miki Sakai
- Narrated by: Jōji Nakata
- Cinematography: Koji Kurata
- Edited by: Naoki Osada
- Music by: Kōtarō Nakagawa
- Production company: Toei
- Distributed by: Toei Co. Ltd
- Release date: August 6, 2011
- Running time: 66 minutes; 73 minutes (Director's Cut)
- Country: Japan
- Language: Japanese
- Box office: US$22.3 million

Kamen Rider OOO Wonderful the Movie: The Shogun and the 21 Core Medals (劇場版 仮面ライダーオーズ WONDERFUL 将軍と21のコアメダル, Gekijōban Kamen Raidā Ōzu Wandafuru Shōgun to Nijū-ichi no Koa Medaru) is the film adaptation of the 2010–2011 Kamen Rider franchise drama Kamen Rider OOO. The film was released on August 6, 2011, alongside Kaizoku Sentai Gokaiger the Movie: The Flying Ghost Ship.

The film introduces Kamen Rider OOO's Burakawani Combo (ブラカワニコンボ, Burakawani Konbo) and the debut of the protagonist of Kamen Rider Fourze.

== Synopsis ==
While leading an expedition in Thuringia, Germany, Kousei Kougami and Erika Satonaka unearth the tomb of an alchemist named Gara. With the seal broken, Gara uses his magic to revive himself, capture Kougami and Satonaka, raise a tower protected by a magical barrier, and transport it to Japan. Eiji Hino, Ankh, and Akira Date investigate and battle knights emerging from the tower. Their fight attracts the Greeed and Gara, who steals most of the combatants' Core Medals and attempts to kill a young boy named Shun Wakaba. After Eiji rescues Shun, Gara announces his intention to become the ruler of a new world before Shintaro Goto arrives and reveals who Gara is. Ankh senses a being similar to Gara and leads the group to a girl named Bell, who is amassing human desire to power Gara's doomsday machine.

As the machine activates, Eiji, Hina Izumi, and several civilians are transported to the Edo period. He attempts to keep the peace between the present and past individuals until the Nue Yummy attacks him. Eiji borrows Date's Rider equipment after losing his, before partially regaining his equipment and escaping with Hina. As Tokugawa Yoshimune dispels rumors about Eiji, Shun reveals to the latter his mother, Satsuki, was kidnapped and possessed by Gara. Meanwhile, Kougami convinces Gara to use Eiji's infinite desire to accelerate his plot.

The next day, Eiji fights the Nue Yummy again, but is overpowered until Hina, Yoshimune, and the Edo civilians help him destroy it. Bell appears before Eiji and offers him the choice of returning to his time while everyone else is erased from existence. He agrees on the condition that he be allowed to bring his family with him. Bell grants his wish, but realizes too late that he considers everyone in the world his family. Gara's machine is overloaded while the displaced individuals are returned to their proper time periods.

After Date and Goto destroy the barrier protecting it, Eiji and Shun storm Gara's tower. As Kougami and Satonaka secretly break out, Gara assumes his true monstrous form to battle Eiji. Shun's presence allows Eiji to free Satsuki before the fight is interrupted by a crash-landing Kamen Rider Fourze, who befriends Eiji before the pair knock Gara into his tower. As Fourze leaves to return to school on time, Gara transforms into a dragon and overpowers Eiji and Date until the Greeed give Eiji their remaining Core Medals so he can destroy Gara with Date's help.

== Cast ==
- Eiji Hino (火野 映司, Hino Eiji): Shu Watanabe (渡部 秀, Watanabe Shū)
- Ankh (アンク, Anku), Shingo Izumi (泉 信吾, Izumi Shingo): Ryosuke Miura (三浦 涼介, Miura Ryōsuke)
- Hina Izumi (泉 比奈, Izumi Hina): Riho Takada (高田 里穂, Takada Riho)
- Akira Date (伊達 明, Date Akira): Hiroaki Iwanaga (岩永 洋昭, Iwanaga Hiroaki)
- Shintaro Goto (後藤 慎太郎, Gotō Shintarō): Asaya Kimijima (君嶋 麻耶, Kimijima Asaya)
- Erika Satonaka (里中 エリカ, Satonaka Erika): Mayuko Arisue (有末 麻祐子, Arisue Mayuko)
- Kazari (カザリ): Taito Hashimoto (橋本 汰斗, Hashimoto Taito)
- Uva (ウヴァ): Yūsuke Yamada (山田 悠介, Yamada Yūsuke)
- Gamel (ガメル, Gameru): Hiroyuki Matsumoto (松本 博之, Matsumoto Hiroyuki)
- Mezool (Human Form) (メズール（人間形態）, Mezūru (Ningen Keitai)): Honoka Yahagi (未来 穂香, Miki Honoka)
- Kiyoto Maki (真木 清人, Maki Kiyoto): Yuu Kamio (神尾 佑, Kamio Yū)
- Chiyoko Shiraishi (白石 千世子, Shiraishi Chiyoko): Marie Kai (甲斐 まり恵, Kai Marie)
- Kousei Kougami (鴻上 光生, Kōgami Kōsei): Takashi Ukaji (宇梶 剛士, Ukaji Takashi)
- Alchemist Gara (錬金術師ガラ, Renkinjutsushi Gara), Satsuki Wakaba (若葉 五月, Wakaba Satsuki): Miki Sakai (酒井 美紀, Sakai Miki)
- Bell (ベル, Beru): Karin Ogino (荻野 可鈴, Ogino Karin)
- Takeshi Wakaba (若葉 毅, Wakaba Takeshi): Taiki Negishi (根岸 泰樹, Negishi Taiki)
- Tokugawa Yoshimune (徳川 吉宗): Ken Matsudaira (松平 健, Matsudaira Ken)
- Gentaro Kisaragi (如月 弦太朗, Kisaragi Gentarō): Sota Fukushi (福士 蒼汰, Fukushi Sōta)
- Yuki Jojima (城島 ユウキ, Jōjima Yūki): Fumika Shimizu (清水 富美加, Shimizu Fumika)
- Rocker: Mitsuru Karahashi (唐橋 充, Karahashi Mitsuru)
- Seizō Fukumoto (福本 清三, Fukumoto Seizō)
- Kamen Rider Girls (仮面ライダーGIRLS, Kamen Raidā Gāruzu)
- Mezool (メズール, Mezūru; Voice): Yukana (ゆかな)
- Gara Inhumanoid Form (ガラ怪人態, Gara Kaijintai; Voice): Ryūzaburō Ōtomo (大友 龍三郎, Ōtomo Ryūzaburō)
- Nue Yummy (鵺ヤミー, Nue Yamī; Voice): Riki Kitazawa (北沢 力, Kitazawa Riki)
- Knights (ナイト兵, Naito Hei; Voice): Ibuki (勇吹輝)
- O-Scanner Voice: Akira Kushida (串田 アキラ, Kushida Akira)
- Narration, Birth Driver Voice, Birth Buster Voice: Jōji Nakata (中田 譲治, Nakata Jōji)
- Fourze Driver (フォーゼドライバー, Fōze Doraibā; Voice): Nobuyuki Hiyama (檜山 修之, Hiyama Nobuyuki)

== Songs ==
Theme song

- "Te o Tsunagō ~Matsuken × Kamen Rider Samba~" (手をつなごう～マツケン×仮面ライダーサンバ～, Te o Tsunagō ~Matsuken × Kamen Raidā Sanba~; lit. "Let's Hold Hands")
  - Lyrics: Shoko Fujibayashi
  - Composition & Arrangement: Shuhei Naruse
  - Artist: Ken Matsudaira feat. Eiji & Ankh (Shu Watanabe & Ryosuke Miura)
