= Kamen Rider × Kamen Rider OOO & W Featuring Skull: Movie War Core =

- Promotional poster for Kamen Rider × Kamen Rider OOO & W Featuring Skull: Movie War Core

Japanese name
- Kanji: 劇場版 仮面ライダー×仮面ライダー オーズ&ダブル feat.スカル MOVIE大戦CORE
Transcriptions
- Revised Hepburn: Gekijōban Kamen Raidā × Kamen Raidā Ōzu Ando Daburu Fīcharingu Sukaru Mūbī Taisen Koa
- Directed by: Ryuta Tasaki
- Written by: Riku Sanjo (Kamen Rider W, Movie War Core); Toshiki Inoue (Kamen Rider OOO)
- Produced by: Ishimori Productions; Toei
- Starring: Shu Watanabe; Ryosuke Miura; Riho Takada; Renn Kiriyama; Masaki Suda; Hikaru Yamamoto; Minehiro Kinomoto; Koji Kikkawa
- Narrated by: Fumihiko Tachiki; Jōji Nakata
- Cinematography: Koji Kurata
- Edited by: Naoki Osada
- Music by: Shuhei Naruse; Kōtarō Nakagawa
- Production company: Toei
- Distributed by: Toei Co. Ltd
- Release date: December 18, 2010
- Running time: 90 minutes; 107 minutes (Director's Cut)
- Countries: Japan; Brazil
- Language: Japanese

Kamen Rider × Kamen Rider OOO & W Featuring Skull: Movie War Core (劇場版 仮面ライダー×仮面ライダー オーズ&ダブル feat.スカル MOVIE大戦CORE, Gekijōban Kamen Raidā × Kamen Raidā Ōzu Ando Daburu Fīcharingu Sukaru Mūbī Taisen Koa) is a 2010 tokusatsu superhero crossover film in the Kamen Rider franchise that features the casts of Kamen Rider W and Kamen Rider OOO. It was originally announced in a teaser at the end of the film Kamen Rider W Forever: A to Z/The Gaia Memories of Fate and was released in Japan on December 18, 2010.

Similar to Kamen Rider × Kamen Rider W & Decade: Movie War 2010, Movie War Core is split into three parts. The Kamen Rider W segment of the film, written by Riku Sanjo, takes place after the series' epilogue, where Akiko Narumi prepares for her wedding when her Kamen Rider friends become distracted by the Pteranodon Yummy (プテラノドンヤミー, Puteranodon Yamī). In the Kamen Rider OOO segment of the film, written by Toshiki Inoue, the Kougami Foundation discovers the mummified remains of Oda Nobunaga and creatie a Cell Medal-based homunculus of the man with his memories. The final segment joins the two groups to fight Kamen Rider Core when he threatens to destroy the world.

Movie War Core opened at number 1 in the Japanese box office in its first weekend, unseating Harry Potter and the Deathly Hallows – Part 1 from its two-week run at number 1.

== Plot ==
=== Skull: Message for W ===
While fighting the male Pteranodon Yummy, Kamen Rider W receives help from Ryu Terui, who is forced to fight without his Rider equipment due to his bride-to-be Akiko Narumi, who wants them to focus on her wedding. After the Yummy escapes, Akiko threatens to call off the wedding, upset that her deceased father, Sokichi Narumi, is unable to attend. Demanding to know why he became a Kamen Rider, the Pteranodon Yummy returns and uses the Memory Gaia Memory on her.

Akiko witnesses a memory from Sokichi's past, where he worked on a case involving opera singer Melissa and an inhuman stalker. While watching Melissa's latest performance, Sokichi met her manager Kozo Yaguchi before Melissa's stalker, the Spider Dopant, attacked. Sokichi fought the criminal before it disappeared with a Gaia Memory dealer named Eren Komori. Despite his partner Seiichiro "Matsu" Matsui's objections, Sokichi continued to investigate Melissa. He later met with his benefactor, Shroud, who told him the Museum is moving forward with their master plan. While meeting with Matsu, Sokichi learned that Yaguchi's previous female clients have gone missing.

Sokichi broke into the Yaguchi Talent Agency, where he found the missing women were being used as test subjects for Gaia Memory research and was confronted by Komori, who transforms into the Bat Dopant. She and the Spider Dopant overwhelm Sokichi, but Shroud gave him the means to transform into Kamen Rider Skull. After receiving a call from a young Akiko and promising to attend her future wedding, Sokichi pursued Komori and the Spider Dopant. He found Yaguchi, who reveals he was only the Museum's Gaia Memory supplier before he was killed by a Spider Bomb concealed in his wife.

The next day, Sokichi deduced that Matsu is the Spider Dopant and confronted him. Exposed, Matsu tried to defend himself until Melissa revealed that Matsu took the Spider Gaia Memory to protect her from Yaguchi and that it warped his mind. Matsu had also previously implanted her with a Spider Bomb that will explode if she touches the person she loves. When he failed to activate it, Matsu went mad and kidnapped Melissa. After killing Komori for impeding him, Sokichi pursued and killed Matsu. As Akiko emerges from the memory, the Pteranodon Yummy escapes.

=== OOO: Nobunaga's Desire ===
The Kougami Foundation finds Oda Nobunaga's mummified remains and use it to create a Cell Medal-based homunculus, which escapes and transforms into a monster. It attacks a man, but Eiji Hino transforms into Kamen Rider OOO to fight it off. While pursuing the monster, he finds an injured man and takes him to the Cous Coussier restaurant, where the man introduces himself as Nobunaga, but fails to remember anything else. Hino takes Nobunaga under his wing and helps him get a job at a software company.

The next day, Nobunaga meets a ballerina named Yoshino Akechi and falls in love with her. When the male Pteranodon Yummy attacks them, Nobunaga receives the Birth Driver from the Kougami Foundation's head, Kousei Kougami, and transforms into Kamen Rider Birth to fight the monster. However, Nobunaga then transforms into the monster Hino fought previously and causes Akechi to sprain her leg while attempting to kill her.

As Hino fights Nobunaga, a Greeed named Giru uses Akechi to create a female Pteranodon Yummy, who attacks Hino and Nobunaga. The former destroys it while the latter suffers from Cell Medal breakdown. Visiting a hospitalized Akechi, Nobunaga uses the last of his power to heal her before the scientist Kiyoto Maki gives him three black Core Medals, which enhances Nobunaga's monstrous form. Upon confronting Nobunaga once more, Hino kills him to end his suffering. The black Core Medals fly off, with Hino in pursuit.

=== Movie War Core ===
Having obtained the most intense memories of Kamen Rider battles, the male Pteranodon Yummy is caught off-guard when the black Core Medals appear, combine with the Memory, and form the giant Kamen Rider Core. It attacks Akiko, but she is saved by Hino, who assures her Sokichi had his reasons for being a Kamen Rider before joining forces with W to fight Core. After taking the fight underground, W and Hino find a crystal that is powering Core and destroy both of them, shattering the components that created it and blasting Hino to Rio de Janeiro. Meanwhile, Terui persuades Akiko to give him his equipment back so he can protect her from the male Pteranodon Yummy, who he destroys with Shintaro Goto's help. With her faith in Kamen Riders restored, everyone hurries back to Akiko's wedding, where Melissa arrives to take Sokichi's place and reveals he was also implanted with a Spider Bomb, which did not die with the Dopant.

== Casting ==
Actor Tarō Yamamoto guest stars in the film as the former partner of Sokichi Narumi, with Koji Kikkawa reprising his role as the character.

== Cast ==
W cast

- Shotaro Hidari (左 翔太郎, Hidari Shōtarō): Renn Kiriyama (桐山 漣, Kiriyama Ren)
- Philip (フィリップ, Firippu): Masaki Suda (菅田 将暉, Suda Masaki)
- Akiko Narumi (鳴海 亜樹子, Narumi Akiko), Melissa (メリッサ, Merissa): Hikaru Yamamoto (山本 ひかる, Yamamoto Hikaru)
- Ryu Terui (照井 竜, Terui Ryū): Minehiro Kinomoto (木ノ本 嶺浩, Kinomoto Minehiro)
- Mikio Jinno (刃野 幹夫, Jinno Mikio): Takeshi Nadagi (なだぎ 武, Nadagi Takeshi)
- Shun Makura (真倉 俊, Makura Shun): Shingo Nakagawa (中川 真吾, Nakagawa Shingo)
- Watcherman (ウォッチャマン, Wotchaman): Nasubi (なすび)
- Santa (サンタちゃん, Santa-chan): Zennosuke Fukkin (腹筋 善之介, Fukkin Zennosuke)
- Queen (クイーン, Kuīn): Tomomi Itano (板野 友美, Itano Tomomi; AKB48)
- Elizabeth (エリザベス, Erizabesu): Tomomi Kasai (河西 智美, Kasai Tomomi; AKB48)
- Sokichi Narumi (鳴海 荘吉, Narumi Sōkichi): Koji Kikkawa (吉川 晃司, Kikkawa Kōji)
- Shroud (シュラウド, Shuraudo; Voice): Naoko Kouda (幸田 直子, Kōda Naoko)
- Matsu (Seiichiro Matsui) (マツ（松井 誠一郎）, Matsu (Matsui Seiichirō)): Tarō Yamamoto (山本 太郎, Yamamoto Tarō)
- Sam (Isamu Bito) (サム（尾藤 勇）, Samu (Bitō Isamu)): Kazuyoshi Ozawa (小沢 和義, Ozawa Kazuyoshi)
- Stone (ストーン, Sutōn): Shiro Tsubuyaki (つぶやき シロー, Tsubuyaki Shirō)
- Eren Komori (小森 絵蓮, Komori Eren): Reon Kadena (かでな れおん, Kadena Reon)
- Kozo Yaguchi (矢口 孝三, Yaguchi Kōzō): Kenta Satoi (佐戸井 けん太, Satoi Kenta)
- Yaguchi's wife: Wakana Nakano (中野 若菜, Nakano Wakana)
- Young Akiko: Saho Ueda (上田 紗帆, Ueda Saho)
- Young Shotaro: Issei Kakazu (嘉数 一星, Kakazu Issei)
- Young Marina Tsumura (津村 真里奈, Tsumura Marina): Emiri Yagi (八木 瑛美莉, Yagi Emiri)
- Gaia Memory Voice: Fumihiko Tachiki (立木 文彦, Tachiki Fumihiko)

OOO cast

- Eiji Hino (火野 映司, Hino Eiji): Shu Watanabe (渡部 秀, Watanabe Shū)
- Ankh (アンク, Anku): Ryosuke Miura (三浦 涼介, Miura Ryōsuke)
- Hina Izumi (泉 比奈, Izumi Hina): Riho Takada (高田 里穂, Takada Riho)
- Shintaro Goto (後藤 慎太郎, Gotō Shintarō): Asaya Kimijima (君嶋 麻耶, Kimijima Asaya)
- Erika Satonaka (里中 エリカ, Satonaka Erika): Mayuko Arisue (有末 麻祐子, Arisue Mayuko)
- Kiyoto Maki (真木 清人, Maki Kiyoto): Yuu Kamio (神尾 佑, Kamio Yū)
- Chiyoko Shiraishi (白石 千世子, Shiraishi Chiyoko): Marie Kai (甲斐 まり恵, Kai Marie)
- Kousei Kougami (鴻上 光生, Kōgami Kōsei): Takashi Ukaji (宇梶 剛士, Ukaji Takashi)
- Nobunaga (ノブナガ): Kengo Ohkuchi (大口 兼悟, Ōkuchi Kengo)
- Yoshino Akechi (明智 よしの, Akechi Yoshino): Sayako (彩也子)
- President of Future Soft (フューチャーソフト, Fyūchā Sofuto): Masayuki Itō (伊藤 正之, Itō Masayuki)
- Employee of Future Soft: Teruaki Ogawa (小川 輝晃, Ogawa Teruaki)
- Gen-san (源さん): Kōji Ise (伊勢 浩二, Ise Kōji)
- Naomi (直美): Yuka Motohashi (本橋 由香, Motohashi Yuka)
- Commercial director: Satoshi Morota (諸田 敏, Morota Satoshi)
- Kazari (カザリ; Voice): Taito Hashimoto (橋本 汰斗, Hashimoto Taito)
- Uva (ウヴァ; Voice): Yūsuke Yamada (山田 悠介, Yamada Yūsuke)
- Gamel (ガメル, Gameru; Voice): Hiroyuki Matsumoto (松本 博之, Matsumoto Hiroyuki)
- Mezool (メズール, Mezūru; Voice): Yukana (ゆかな)
- Male Pteranodon Yummy (プテラノドンヤミー, Puteranodon Yamī; Voice): Yoshimitsu Shimoyama (下山 吉光, Shimoyama Yoshimitsu)
- Female Pteranodon Yummy (Voice): Ami Michizoe (道添 愛美, Michizoe Ami)
- Armored Warrior Inhumanoid (鎧武者怪人, Yoroimusha Kaijin; Voice): Keikō Sakai (酒井 敬幸, Sakai Keikō)
- "Kyouryu Greeed" (恐竜グリード, Kyōryū Gurīdo; Voice): (Note: Also known as "Giru" (ギル).) Kenji Hamada (浜田 賢二, Hamada Kenji)
- O-Scanner Voice: Akira Kushida (串田 アキラ, Kushida Akira)
- Birth Driver Voice: Jōji Nakata (中田 譲治, Nakata Jōji)

Movie War cast

- Kamen Rider Core (仮面ライダーコア, Kamen Raidā Koa; Voice): Fumihiko Tachiki

== Theme song ==
- "HEART∞BREAKER"
  - Lyrics: Maki Ohguro
  - Composition: Koji Kikkawa
  - Arrangement: Hiroaki Sugawara
  - Artist: DaiKichi (DaiKichi～大吉～)
  Daikichi is a musical unit composed of Koji Kikkawa and Maki Ohguro using the first kanji of their surnames. This name is literally translated as "Great Luck". The unit was originally named "Koji Kikkawa × Maki Ohguro" (吉川晃司×大黒摩季, Kikkawa Kōji × Ōguro Maki). The single was released on December 15, 2010.

The film's soundtrack was released on December 15, 2010.
