= Kimishima =

Kimishima (written: 君島 or 君嶋, also spelled Kimijima) is a Japanese surname. Notable people with the surname include:

- Arisa Kimishima (君嶋 愛梨沙; born 1995), Japanese bobsledder and sprinter
- Asaya Kimijima (君嶋 麻耶; born 1987), Japanese model and actor
- Haru Nemuri (君島 悠奈; born Haruna Kimishima, 1995), Japanese singer and songwriter
- Tatsumi Kimishima (君島 達己; born 1950), Japanese businessman
