= OOO, Den-O, All Riders: Let's Go Kamen Riders =

Japanese name
- Kanji: オーズ・電王・オールライダー レッツゴー仮面ライダー
Transcriptions
- Revised Hepburn: Ōzu Den'ō Ōru Raidā Rettsu Gō Kamen Raidā
- Directed by: Osamu Kaneda
- Written by: Shōji Yonemura
- Produced by: Ishimori Productions; Toei
- Starring: Shu Watanabe; Dori Sakurada; Ryosuke Miura; Riho Takada; Rina Akiyama; Kenjirō Ishimaru
- Narrated by: Fumihiko Tachiki
- Cinematography: Masao Inokuma
- Edited by: Hiroshi Sunaga
- Music by: Kōtarō Nakagawa
- Production company: Toei
- Distributed by: Toei Co. Ltd
- Release date: April 1, 2011
- Running time: 93 minutes
- Country: Japan
- Language: Japanese
- Box office: US$16.04 million

OOO, Den-O, All Riders: Let's Go Kamen Riders (オーズ・電王・オールライダー レッツゴー仮面ライダー, Ōzu Den'ō Ōru Raidā Rettsu Gō Kamen Raidā) is a superhero film that was released on April 1, 2011, to commemorate the 40th anniversary of the Kamen Rider franchise. While the film features all of the franchise's protagonists, the main heroes of the original Kamen Rider TV series (1 and 2), Kamen Rider Den-O, and Kamen Rider OOO serve as the main characters. The film's subtitle "Let's Go Kamen Riders" is an homage to the theme song of the original series, "Let's Go!! Rider Kick" (レッツゴー！！ライダーキック, Rettsu Gō!! Raidā Kikku). The film also marks the 60th anniversary of the Toei Company, and features cameos from Kikaider, Kikaider 01, Inazuman, and Zubat from four of Shotaro Ishinomori's other works.

A preview of the film was originally scheduled for March 15, 2011, but was cancelled after the venue's structure was compromised as a result of the 2011 Tōhoku earthquake and tsunami.

Let's Go Kamen Riders opened at the #1 spot in the Japanese box offices in the first two weekends of its release.

== Plot ==
Eiji Hino battles three Mole Imagin until the monsters use a nearby boy, Naoki, to travel through time. Kotaro Nogami and Teddy arrive in the DenLiner and determine the Mole Imagin traveled to November 11, 1971. Hino's ally Ankh convinces him to join Nogami and board the DenLiner, where they are warned by the train's owner to stay aboard to avoid disrupting time.

Arriving in 1971, Nogami eliminates the Mole Imagin while Ankh attempts to steal his fellow Greeed's Core Medals. Hino goes after him, but Nogami and the DenLiner's Imagin crew discover and retrieve the pair. Unbeknownst to them, Ankh dropped a Cell Medal, which a Shocker Combatman finds and presents to General Black.

After being returned to the present, Ankh and Hino pursue Naoki and his friends Mitsuru and Shigeru after the boys pickpocket them, but run into Shocker-aligned police officers. After Ankh and Hino escape and encounter the kids again, the former conducts research into Shocker, learning that they managed to take over Japan and merged themselves with other Kamen Riders' enemies to take over the world and render humanity nearly extinct. The Shocker Police find them again, forcing the group to flee while Hino stays behind to fight them, but he is defeated by Shocker's elite soldiers, Kamen Riders 1 and 2. After the group is rescued by the DenLiner crew, they learn that Shocker found a Core Medal in 1971 and combined it with the Cell Medal that Ankh dropped to create the Shocker Greeed, who defeated 1 and 2 and allowed Shocker to brainwash them. Hino offers to help, but Nogami drops him off in a different location, where he meets the Hina Izumi of the altered present. The DenLiner crew learn too late that Mitsuru, Naoki, and Ankh are still with them.

Returning to the past, Nogami recovers the Cell Medal, but Ankh drops another one, which is found by a Kamen Rider Scout named Nokko, who mistakes the DenLiner crew for Shocker agents. She reconvenes with her fellow Scouts, but Black takes the Cell Medal from them. Nogami and Momotaros battle Black's forces while Mitsuru and Naoki escape with the Scouts. 1 and 2 cover them and give Black a fake Cell Medal with a transmitter to locate Shocker's headquarters while Nogami destroys the original Cell Medal.

Arriving at Shocker's headquarters, the Riders realize they fell into a trap and Nogami took the fake Medal before Black creates the Shocker Greeed to attack them. Outside, Shocker forces attack the DenLiner, forcing the train's owner to order a retreat. The Riders get Naoki and Teddy onboard, but they jump off before it travels through time. The DenLiner crew return to the altered present and rejoin Hino, but he and Nogami are captured while the others escape. Arriving at the kids' spare hideout, Ankh, Momotaros, Izumi, and the kids find Teddy's body and a time capsule containing a letter from Naoki. He reveals Teddy sacrificed himself to get him, 1, and 2 to safety. Shocker forces attack again, though Momotaros and Ankh get captured while covering Izumi and the kids' escape.

The next day, Shocker prepares to publicly execute their captives, but Shigeru returns Hino's Rider equipment before 1 and 2 appear, revealing a turncoat Shocker scientist undid their brainwashing. The audience revolts as the captives are freed. 1, 2, Nogami, and Hino are joined by the rest of their Rider allies, Kikaider, Kikaider 01, Inazuman and Zubat, who help them destroy Black, the Shocker Greeed, and their forces. Shocker's Great Leader overpowers the Riders until Hino receives new Rider powers, which he uses to weaken the Great Leader. Enraged, the Great Leader transforms into Rock Great Leader, but more Riders join the fight and destroy him. Following this, the scientist reveals himself as an older Naoki, who lived in the past, married Nokko, and became Mitsuru's father. Hino bids Nogami farewell before the DenLiner embarks on its next destination.

== Internet spin-off films ==
Titled OOO, Den-O, All Riders: Let's Go Kamen Riders ~Let's Look! Only Your 48 Riders~ (ネット版 オーズ・電王・オールライダー レッツゴー仮面ライダー ～ガチで探せ！君だけのライダー48～, Nettoban Ōzu Den'ō Ōru Raidā Rettsu Gō Kamen Raidā ~Gachi de Sagase! Kimi dake no Raidā Fōtī Eito~), the films total to 48 shorts that were released every Friday beginning March 11, 2011. Each webisode focuses on a Kamen Rider that matches a specific Zodiac sign and blood type. There are eight different formats for the web movies:

- "Bride!" (花嫁！, Hanayome!): Urataros' segment. At the Cous Coussier restaurant, Eiji wants to marry Hina, and asks her father for his blessing. However, Hina's father is General Shadow, who disapproves of vagabonds and unreliable people marrying his daughter. Eiji becomes the featured Kamen Rider to deal with the situation differently.
- "Bell Pepper!" (ピーマン！, Pīman!): Naoki is served lunch by Hina. Unfortunately, the meal consists mainly of bell peppers, which he hates. The featured Kamen Rider arrives at the restaurant to help make the meal more appetizing for Naoki.
- "I Love It!" (お好き！, Osuki!): Kivat's segment. While looking at the movie posters for Let's Go Kamen Riders, Eiji and Ankh argue over who is more talented. The featured Kamen Rider arrives at the restaurant to calm the duo with his personality.
- "Listening Quietly!" (静聴！, Seichō!): Sieg's segment. The featured Kamen Rider makes his speech at the First National Kamen Rider State of the Union Address in front of a crowd of Shocker grunts. There, he reveals a small trivia about himself, often arguing about a critical flaw in his series which leads to a blind rant before being dragged off the stage by Kamen Rider #1 (or Kamen Rider #2), Kamen Rider Den-O and Kamen Rider OOO.
- "Grab It!" (つかめ！, Tsukame!): Kivat's segment. In a household with a "family" of Shocker grunts, the son gets an item based on the featured Kamen Rider's lucky charm and learns how to use it.
- "Lucky Food!" (ラッキーフード！, Rakkī Fūdo!): Momotaros' segment. The featured Kamen Rider visits Cous Coussier, where Eiji and Hina must determine what his lucky food is. The meal prepared by Hina is always correct, as it reflects the personality of the Kamen Rider.
- "Ice Cream!" (アイス！, Aisu!): Kivat's segment. Ankh goes to the Cous Coussier's kitchen to satisfy his hunger for popsicles, but discovers that the popsicle box in the freezer is empty. Kivat then determines Ankh's lucky color based on the featured form of Kamen Rider Kuuga. The next scene has Ankh wearing the lucky color and grabbing a popsicle with a flavor of that color.
- "Game" (勝負, Shōbu): Kivat's segment. The featured card-based Kamen Rider plays a game of poker with Kamen Rider Garren, Kamen Rider Chalice, and General Shadow, but has a bad hand. Using his own tactics, he must think of a way to win the round.

Each webisode is alternatively hosted by Sieg, Momotaros, Kivat and Urataros.

== Cast ==
- Eiji Hino (火野 映司, Hino Eiji): Shu Watanabe (渡部 秀, Watanabe Shū)
- Kotaro Nogami (野上 幸太郎, Nogami Kōtarō): Dori Sakurada (桜田 通, Sakurada Dōri)
- Ankh (アンク, Anku), Shingo Izumi (泉 信吾, Izumi Shingo): Ryosuke Miura (三浦 涼介, Miura Ryōsuke)
- Hina Izumi (泉 比奈, Izumi Hina): Riho Takada (高田 里穂, Takada Riho)
- Naomi (ナオミ): Rina Akiyama (秋山 莉奈, Akiyama Rina)
- Mitsuru (ミツル): Yūki Imai (今井 悠貴, Imai Yūki)
- Naoki (ナオキ): Fumiki Yoshikawa (吉川 史樹, Yoshikawa Fumiki)
- Shigeru (シゲル): Roi Hayashi (林 遼威, Hayashi Roi)
- Nokko (ノッコ): Yuri Tsunematsu (恒松 祐里, Tsunematsu Yuri)
- Shotaro Hidari (左 翔太郎, Hidari Shōtarō): Renn Kiriyama (桐山 漣, Kiriyama Ren)
- Philip (フィリップ, Firippu): Masaki Suda (菅田 将暉, Suda Masaki)
- Master of Fuumen (風麺のマスター, Fūmen no Masutā): Hiroshi Doki (道木 広志, Dōki Hiroshi)
- General Black (ブラック将軍, Burakku-shōgun): Seizō Fukumoto (福本 清三, Fukumoto Seizō)
- Owner (オーナー, Ōnā): Kenjirō Ishimaru (石丸 謙二郎, Ishimaru Kenjirō)
- Shocker Scientist (Naoki) (ショッカー科学者(ナオキ), Shokkā Kagakusha (Naoki)): Isao Sasaki (ささき いさお, Sasaki Isao)

=== Voice actors ===
- Momotaros (モモタロス, Momotarosu): Toshihiko Seki (関 俊彦, Seki Toshihiko)
- Urataros (ウラタロス, Uratarosu): Kōji Yusa (遊佐 浩二, Yusa Kōji)
- Kintaros (キンタロス, Kintarosu), Shadow Moon (シャドームーン, Shadō Mūn): Masaki Terasoma (てらそま まさき, Terasoma Masaki)
- Ryutaros (リュウタロス, Ryūtarosu), Garagaranda (ガラガランダ): Kenichi Suzumura (鈴村 健一, Suzumura Ken'ichi)
- Teddy (テディ, Tedi): Daisuke Ono (小野 大輔, Ono Daisuke)
- Kamen Rider Birth (仮面ライダーバース, Kamen Raidā Bāsu): Hiroaki Iwanaga (岩永 洋昭, Iwanaga Hiroaki)
- General Shadow (ジェネラルシャドウ, Jeneraru Shadō): Hidekatsu Shibata (柴田 秀勝, Shibata Hidekatsu)
- High Priest Darom (大神官ダロム, Daishinkan Daromu), King Dark (キングダーク, Kingu Dāku): Shōzō Iizuka (飯塚 昭三, Iizuka Shōzō)
- General Jark (ジャーク将軍, Jāku-shōgun): Seizō Katō (加藤 精三, Katō Seizō)
- Great Leader of Shocker (ショッカー大首領, Shokkā Daishuryō): Gorō Naya (納谷 悟朗, Naya Gorō)
- Kamen Rider 1 (仮面ライダー1号, Kamen Raidā Ichigō): Hiroshi Fujioka (藤岡 弘、, Fujioka Hiroshi)
- Kamen Rider 2 (仮面ライダー2号, Kamen Raidā Nigō): Takeshi Sasaki (佐々木 剛, Sasaki Takeshi)
- Kamen Rider V3 (仮面ライダーV3, Kamen Raidā Bui Surī), Zubat (ズバット, Zubatto): Hiroshi Miyauchi (宮内 洋, Miyauchi Hiroshi)
- Shocker Greeed (ショッカーグリード, Shokkā Gurīdo), Ten-Faced Demon Llumu Qhimil (十面鬼ユム・キミル, Jūmenki Yumu Kimiru), Inazuman (イナズマン): Hideo Ishikawa (石川 英郎, Ishikawa Hideo)
- Ikadevil (イカデビル, Ikadebiru), Kamen Rider Amazon (仮面ライダーアマゾン, Kamen Raidā Amazon), Kamen Rider Stronger (仮面ライダーストロンガー, Kamen Raidā Sutorongā), Kikaider (キカイダー, Kikaidā): Tomokazu Seki (関 智一, Seki Tomokazu)
- Riderman (ライダーマン, Raidāman), Kamen Rider Black (仮面ライダーBLACK, Kamen Raidā Burakku), Jaguar Man (ジャガーマン, Jagāman), Shocker Combatman (ショッカー戦闘員, Shokkā Sentōin): Ibuki (勇吹輝)
- Apollo Geist (アポロガイスト, Aporo Gaisuto): Kazuhisa Kawahara (川原 和久, Kawahara Kazuhisa)
- Mole Imagin (モールイマジン, Mōru Imajin) (1): Akira Sasanuma (笹沼 晃, Sasanuma Akira)
- Mole Imagin (2): Kengo Takanashi (高梨 謙吾, Takanashi Kengo)
- Mole Imagin (3), Shiomaneking (シオマネキング, Shiomanekingu): Hisafumi Oda (小田 久史, Oda Hisafumi)
- O-Scanner Voice: Akira Kushida (串田 アキラ, Kushida Akira)
- Gaia Memory Voice: Fumihiko Tachiki (立木 文彦, Tachiki Fumihiko)

== Theme song ==
- "Let's Go RiderKick 2011"
  - Artist: Kamen Rider Girls
