= Shizue =

- Gender: Female

Origin
- Origin: Japanese
- Meaning: Different meanings depending on the kanji used

Shizue (written: 静江, しずえ/しづえ in hiragana or シズエ/シヅエ in katakana) is a feminine Japanese given name (the ず/ヅ variants are sometimes romanized as Shidzue). Notable people with the name include:

- Shizue Abe (あべ 静江; born 1951), Japanese idol, actress and singer
- Shidzue Katō (加藤 シヅエ; 1897–2001), Japanese activist and politician
- Shizue Miyabe (宮部 シズエ; born 1938), Japanese swimmer
- Shizue Natsukawa (夏川 静江; 1909–1999), Japanese actress
- Shizue Takanashi (たかなし しずえ), Japanese manga artist
- Shizue Tatsuta (龍田 静枝}; 1903–1962), Japanese actress
- Shizue Ukaji (宇梶 静江; born 1933), Ainu activist

== Fictional characters ==
- Shizue, known as Isabelle in the English versions, a character from Animal Crossing
- Shizue Izawa, known as Shizu, a character from That Time I Got Reincarnated as a Slime
- Shizue Kuranushi, known as Boss, from AI: The Somnium Files
