= Shu Watanabe (actor) =

Japanese actor

- 渡部秀
- Born: 26 October 1991 (age 34); Yurihonjō, Akita Prefecture, Japan
- Occupation: Actor
- Years active: 2009–present
- Agent: G-Star.Pro

Shu Watanabe (渡部 秀, Watanabe Shū; born October 26, 1991) is a Japanese actor, famous for portraying the character Eiji Hino in the 2010 tokusatsu series Kamen Rider OOO.

== Filmography ==
=== TV series ===
Year	Title	Role	Notes	Ref.
2010	Gekikoi: Unmei no Love Story	Minato Hirose		
2010	Flunk Punk Rumble	Kobayashi	Episode 2	
2010	Kamen Rider OOO	Eiji Hino/Kamen Rider OOO	Lead role	
2012	Mōsō Sōsa: Kuwagata Kōichi Junkyōju no Stylish na Seikatsu	Sentarō Numabukuro		
2012	Jun and Ai	Tsuyoshi Kanō	Asadora	
2013	Emergency Room 24hours	Yū Saruta	Episode 8 - Final episode	
2013	The Stork Nest	Takashi Yasuda		
2014	Nezumi, Edo o Hashiru	Ichibee Hayazaki		
2014	Shinigami-kun	Naoyuki Sanjō	Episode 1	
2014	Coffee-ya no Hitobito	Shigeru Nakazato	Episode 4 & Final episode	
2014	Last Doctor: Kansatsui Akita no Kenshi Hōkoku	Yūta Ikeda		
2014	Shakking: Karei Naru Shakkin Hensai Sakusen	Hidetoki Nakada		
2015	Mondai no Aru Restaurant		Final episode	
2015	Fukuoka Renai Hakusho 10: Jukkaime no Suzu ga Naru Toki	Yuzuru Imai		
2015	Your Story	Eguchi	Episode 6	
2016	Ōoku	Hyōgo Ōtsuki		
2016	Nezumi, Edo o Hashiru 2	Ichibee Hayazaki		
2016	When You Wish Upon A Sakura	Ryo Igawa	Lead role	
2017–22	The Woman of S.R.I.	Rota Hashiguchi	Season 16–21	
2018	Love Rerun	Daisuke Sayama		
2018	Seigi no Se	Kōichi Gotō		
2018	Giver: Fukushū no Zōyosha	Kazuki Onoda		
2018	Kamen Rider Zi-O	Eiji Hino	Episodes 9 & 10	
2019	Secret × Heroine Phantomirage!	Osamu Hayashida	Episode 19	
2023	I Became the Main Role of a BL Drama	Joji Kijima	Supporting cast	
2024	Batsukoi	Teruyoshi Sunagoya		
2025	I Became the Main Role of a BL Drama	Joji Kijima	Supporting cast; season 2	

=== Films ===
Year	Title	Role	Notes	Ref.
2010	Kamen Rider W Forever: A to Z/The Gaia Memories of Fate	Eiji Hino/Kamen Rider OOO	Cameo	
2010	Kamen Rider × Kamen Rider OOO & W Featuring Skull: Movie War Core	Eiji Hino/Kamen Rider OOO	Lead role	
2011	OOO, Den-O, All Riders: Let's Go Kamen Riders	Eiji Hino/Kamen Rider OOO	Lead role	
2011	Kamen Rider OOO Wonderful: The Shogun and the 21 Core Medals	Eiji Hino/Kamen Rider OOO	Lead role	
2011	Kamen Rider × Kamen Rider Fourze & OOO: Movie War Mega Max	Eiji Hino/Kamen Rider OOO	Lead role	
2012	Double Sky!	Dai Miyagawa	Lead role	
2012	Kamen Rider × Super Sentai: Super Hero Taisen	Eiji Hino/Kamen Rider OOO		
2012	Piece ~Fragments of a Memory~	Tomoki Chino		
2012	Kamen Rider × Kamen Rider Wizard & Fourze: Movie War Ultimatum	Eiji Hino/Kamen Rider OOO	Cameo	
2015	Attack on Titan	Fukushi		
2016	Shūkatsu		Lead role in episode 4	
2017	Brave Storm	Ken Kurenai	Lead role	
2017	Kamen Rider Heisei Generations Final: Build & Ex-Aid with Legend Rider	Eiji Hino/Kamen Rider OOO		
2018	Shūkatsu 2		Lead role in final episode	
2018	The Final Parting	Takahiro Kawamura		
2018	Shūkatsu 3		Lead role in episode 1	
2019	Aiuta: My Promise to Nakuhito	Okita		
2021	The Woman of S.R.I. the Movie	Rota Hashiguchi		
2022	Tears of Persephone		Lead role	
2022	Kamen Rider OOO 10th: Core Medal of Resurrection	Eiji Hino/Kamen Rider OOO	Lead role	
2023	Natchan's Little Secret	Moririn		
2025	Principal Examination			
2026	Duty first, kiss later	Takoi Heisuke	Lead role	

== Discography ==
Under his character name Eiji Hino, Watanabe performed most of the insert themes for the 2010 tokusatsu series Kamen Rider OOO and the theme for the series' film.
