= Anything Goes! (Maki Ohguro song) =

- The cover of the CD+DVD combo pack featuring Maki Ohguro

Single by Maki Ohguro
- Released: November 17, 2010
- Genre: Pop, ska punk, ska
- Label: Avex Trax
- Songwriters: Shoko Fujibayashi, Tatsuo, Kōtarō Nakagawa

Maki Ohguro singles chronology
"It's All Right" (2010)	"Anything Goes!" (2010)	"Heart Breaker" (2010)

Kamen Rider Series theme song singles chronology
"Stay the Ride Alive" (2010)	"Anything Goes!" (2010)	"Switch On!" (2011)

Alternative cover
- The cover of the standard CD release featuring Kamen Rider OOO Tatoba Combo

"Anything Goes!" is a song by Japanese recording artist Maki Ohguro, her 32nd single in her over twenty-year-long career. The song serves as the opening theme of the 2010-2011 Kamen Rider Series Kamen Rider OOO. The single for the song was released on November 17, 2010, as a standard CD release and a CD+DVD release featuring the music video for the song. On September 15, 2010, Avex released the opening sequence edit of the song to digital music outlets. The single includes 3 variations of the song: the single cut, a ska edit, and the instrumental track. Japan-based rapper Rah-D is featured on the track. "Anything Goes!" is Maki Ohguro's first single in 11 years to break the top 10 of the Oricon at number 7, after selling 33,000 copies in its first week of release.

A balladic version of the song titled "Anything Goes! “Ballad”" was played during the final scenes of the finale of Kamen Rider OOO. Ohguro stated that she thought that the song would also work as a slow ballad, especially after she has been watching how the series has progressed, and recorded the song during her hiatus from releases. She also expressed, how she think her children would react when they grow up and watch the future Kamen Rider shows, believing they will think she was cool for having recorded the Kamen Rider OOO theme song. The balladic version was initially to be released as a single on October 19, 2011, but was eventually pushed back to December 7 of that year.

== Track listing ==
The complete track listing has not been confirmed.

1. "Anything Goes!" — 3:33
2. "Anything Goes! (Ska Foundation Edit.)" — 3:13
3. "Anything Goes! (Instrumental)" — 3:31

=== DVD track listing ===
1. "Anything Goes! (Music Film)"

=== Digital release ===
1. "Anything Goes! (TV ver.)" — 1:12

== Charts ==
Chart	Peak position
Oricon daily singles	4
Oricon weekly singles	7

=== Sales and certifications ===
Chart	Amount
Oricon physical sales	53,000
RIAJ full-length cellphone downloads	Gold (100,000+)
