= Mayuko Arisue =

Japanese model, actress and entertainer

- 有末 麻祐子
- Born: January 25, 1992 (age 34); Ageo, Saitama, Japan
- Occupations: model; actress; entertainer
- Agents: Asaikikaku; LesPros Entertainment (business alliance)
- Height: 164 cm (5 ft 5 in)

Mayuko Arisue (有末 麻祐子, Arisue Mayuko; born January 25, 1992 in Ageo, Saitama, Japan) is a Japanese model, actress and entertainer who is represented by the talent agency, Asai Kikaku. She also has a business alliance with LesPros Entertainment.

== Filmography ==
=== TV series ===
Year	Title	Role	Network	Notes	Ref.
2008	Tadashii Ouji no Tsukuri Kata	Hsuyuzu Sano	TV Tokyo		
2008	Cat Street	Sayumi	NHK G	Episode 5	
2008	Love17	Miwa Matsuo	NBN		
2009	Koi to Oshare to Otoko no ko		BS-TBS		
2009	Kētai Keiji Zenigata Inochi	Mayuko	BS-TBS	Episode 5	
2010	Keishichō Kidō Sōsa-tai 216	Rie Asai	TBS		
2010	Kamen Rider OOO	Erika Satonaka	TV Asahi		
2011	Asuko Māchi: Asuka Kōgyō Kōkō Monogatari	Kaori Yamaki	TV Asahi	Episode 6	
2012	Lucky Seven	Yuri	CS Fuji		
2012	Sengoku Basara	Kenshin Uesugi	MBS		

=== Films ===
Year	Title	Role	Notes
2008	Hyaku Wachi	Sennagisa	
2008	Seifuku Sabai Girl	Na Kudo	
2009	Girls Love	Sanae	
2009	The Setting Sun		
2010	Hai! Moshimoshi, Ōtsuka Yakkyokudesuga	Eiko Otsuka	
2010	Kamen Rider × Kamen Rider OOO & W Featuring Skull: Movie War Core	Erika Satonaka	
2011	Koigakubo Gakuen Tantei-bu Series : Hōkago wa Mystery to Tomoni	Reika Ogasawara	
2011	Kamen Rider OOO Wonderful: The Shogun and the 21 Core Medals	Erika Satonaka	
2011	Kamen Rider × Kamen Rider Fourze & OOO: Movie War Mega Max	Erika Satonaka	
2012	Soul of Rock	Reika	Lead role
2012	Yamikin Ushijima-kun	Yuka	
