= Renn Kiriyama =

Japanese actor

- Born: February 2, 1985 (age 41); Yokohama, Kanagawa Prefecture, Japan
- Occupation: Actor
- Years active: 2006–present
- Height: 175 cm (5 ft 9 in)
- Website: http://ameblo.jp/renn-kiriyama

Renn Kiriyama (桐山 漣, Kiriyama Ren; born February 2, 1985) is a Japanese stage and television actor from Yokohama. His debut role was as Bunta Marui in The Prince of Tennis musical Absolute King Rikkai feat. Rokkaku ~ First Service. Kiriyama is also known for his role in Shotaro Hidari, the male lead and half of the eponymous hero of the television series Kamen Rider W.

== Filmography ==
=== Filmography ===
Year	Title	Role	Notes
2007	Rambling Love		
2007	Boy Love		
2008	Cafe Daikanyama -Sweet Boys-		
2008	Cafe Daikanyama II ~Yume no Tsuzuki~		
2008	Cafe Daikanyama III ~Sorezore no Ashita~		
2008	Bokura no Houteishiki		
2009	Beat Rock Love		
2009	Kamen Rider Decade: All Riders vs. Dai-Shocker	Shotaro Hidari / Kamen Rider W (Voice)	Cameo, voice role (along with Masaki Suda)
2009	Kamen Rider × Kamen Rider W & Decade: Movie War 2010	Shotaro Hidari/Kamen Rider W	Lead role
2010	Kamen Rider W Forever: A to Z/The Gaia Memories of Fate	Shotaro Hidari/Kamen Rider W/Kamen Rider Joker	Lead role
2010	Kamen Rider × Kamen Rider OOO & W Featuring Skull: Movie War Core	Shotaro Hidari/Kamen Rider W	Lead role
2011	OOO, Den-O, All Riders: Let's Go Kamen Riders	Shotaro Hidari/Kamen Rider W	Cameo
2011	Kamen Rider W Returns	Shotaro Hidari/Kamen Rider W	Cameo
2011	RUN60		Lead role
2011	KIMI E		Lead role
2011	Kichijoji no Asahina-kun		Lead role
2011	Kamen Rider × Kamen Rider Fourze & OOO: Movie War Mega Max	Shotaro Hidari/Kamen Rider W/Kamen Rider Joker	
2014	Heisei Riders vs. Shōwa Riders: Kamen Rider Taisen feat. Super Sentai	Shotaro Hidari/Kamen Rider W/Kamen Rider Joker	
2014	L DK	Wataru Sanjo	
2015	Ju-On: The Final Curse	Sota Kitamura	
2017	Laughing Under the Clouds	Shirasu Kinjō	
2019	Sadako	Miniru Fujii	
2020	I Want to Be Loved	Takuma	Lead role

=== TV ===
Year	Title	Role	Notes	Ref
2008	Tadashii Ouji no Tsukurikata	Yoshiyuki Kirin		
2008	Tokyo Ghost Trip	Inui Kai		
2008	Shibatora	Igarashi	Episode 7 and 8	
2009	Reset		Episode 1	
2009	Kamen Rider W	Shotaro Hidari/Kamen Rider W/Kamen Rider Joker	Lead role	
2011	Honboshi			
2011	Hana-Kimi 2011			
2011	Switch Girl!!	Arata Kamiyama		
2012	Becoming a Doctor at Age 37			
2012	Run 60		Lead role	
2012	Monsters		Episode 1	
2012	Switch Girl!! 2	Arata Kamiyama		
2020	Likes! Mr. Genji			
2021	Colorful Love	Kira		
2021	Enjoy Drinking Alone	Ruiji Asaoka		
2021	Love is Phantom	Kei Hase		
2024	ACMA:GAME	Yoichi Nagakute		

=== Stage ===
- Musical The Prince of Tennis – Bunta Marui
  - Absolute King Rikkai feat. Rokkaku ~ First Service
  - Dream Live 4th
  - Absolute King Rikkai feat. Rokkaku ~ Second Service
  - Dream Live 5th
  - Switch wo osu toki (2007)
