= Takashi Ukaji =

Japanese actor (born 1962)

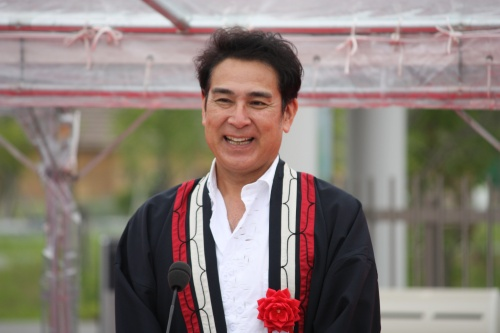
- Born: 宇梶 剛士; August 15, 1962 (age 64); Kabukichō, Tokyo, Japan
- Occupation: Actor
- Years active: 1988–present
- Known for: Ultraman Gaia; Kamen Rider OOO; Fist of the North Star: The Legends of the True Savior; Legends of the Dark King

Takashi Ukaji (宇梶 剛士, Ukaji Takashi; born August 15, 1962 in Tokyo) is a Japanese actor of Ainudescent.

== Early life ==
Born in Tokyo, but raised in Hiroshima Prefecture, Ukaji was the leader of one of Japan's largest bosozoku groups before becoming an actor. His mother is Shizue Ukaji, a prominent Ainu poet and artist.

== Career ==
Ukaji appeared in Shinji Aoyama's 2011 film Tokyo Park.

== Filmography ==
=== Film ===
- Passenger: Sugisarishi Hibi (1987)
- Osu!! Karate Bu (1990)
- Score (1995)
- Ultraman Gaia: Gaia Once Again (2001)
- Joker (1998)
- GTO (1999)
- Gun Crazy: A Woman from Nowhere (2002)
- Nin x Nin (2004)
- Sen no Kaze ni Natte (2004)
- Eiko (2004)
- Awakening (2006)
- Fist of the North Star: The Legends of the True Savior (2006-2008)
- 20th Century Boys: Beginning of the End (2008)
- 20th Century Boys 2: The Last Hope (2009)
- Zatoichi: The Last (2010)
- Kamen Rider × Kamen Rider OOO & W Featuring Skull: Movie War Core (2010), Kōsei Kōgami
- Kamen Rider OOO Wonderful: The Shogun and the 21 Core Medals (2011), Kōsei Kōgami
- Kamen Rider × Kamen Rider Fourze & OOO: Movie War Mega Max (2011), Kōsei Kōgami
- Peak: The Rescuers (2011)
- Wild 7 (2011)
- Tokyo Park (2011)
- Strawberry Night (2013)
- Kingdom (2019), Wei Xing
- Masquerade Hotel (2019), Mitsuhiro Tatebayashi
- Saber + Zenkaiger: Super Hero Senki (2021), Kōsei Kōgami
- Last of the Wolves (2021), Akira Mizoguchi
- Tombi: Father and Son (2022)
- Shikkokuten (2022)
- Higuma!! The Killer Bear (2026), Kanzaki

=== Television ===
- Kimi ga Uso o Tsuita (1988)
- Aishiatteru Kai (1989)
- Miseinen (1995)
- Toumei Ningen (1996)
- Ginrou Kaiki File (1996)
- Tsubasa wo Kudasai! (1996)
- Narita Rikon (1997)
- Kin no Tamago (1997)
- Aoi Tori (1997)
- Under the Same Roof 2 (1997)
- Jinbē (1998)
- Ultraman Gaia (1998-1999)
- Psychometrer Eiji 2 (1999)
- Perfect Love (1999)
- Lipstick (1999)
- Hensyuo (2000)
- Hōjō Tokimune (2001) - Kujō Yoritsune
- Star no Koi (2001)
- Hero (2001)
- Mama no Idenshi (2002)
- Kaidan Hyaku Monogatari (2002)
- Kyohansha (2003)
- Shinsengumi! (2004)
- Umeko (2005)
- Nobuta wo Produce (2005)
- Water Boys 2005 Natsu (2005)
- Rikon Bengoshi 2 (2005)
- Hana Yome wa Yakudoshi (2006)
- Hanazakari no Kimitachi e (2007)
- Legends of the Dark King (2008)
- Kamen Rider OOO (2010-2011) - Kousei Kougami
- Taira no Kiyomori (2012) - Minamoto no Yorimasa
- A Chef of Nobunaga (2013)
- Gunshi Kanbei (2014) - Shimizu Muneharu
- The Full-Time Wife Escapist (2016) Tochio Moriyama
- Naotora: The Lady Warlord (2017) - Ii Naomitsu
- BG Personal Bodyguard (2018)
- Natsuzora: Natsu's Sky (2019)
- The Sun Stands Still: The Eclipse (2020)
- The Fugitive (2020) - Tomohisa Ōiso
- Utsubyō 9dan (2020) - Daisuke Suzuki
- The Supporting Actors 3 (2021) - Himself
- Fermat's Cuisine (2023) - Isao Kitada
- Golden Kamuy: The Hunt of Prisoners in Hokkaido (2024) - great uncle in Yūfutsu
- Water Margin (2026) - Lu Junyi

=== Video games ===
- Stranger Than Heaven (2027) - Genzo Iwaki, Tadashi Hataoka

=== Dubbing ===
- Samurai Jack (2002) - Jack
