= Marie Kai =

Japanese actress

- 甲斐 まり恵
- Born: June 13, 1980 (age 46); Ichinomiya (now Aso), Aso District, Kumamoto, Japan
- Occupation: Actress
- Years active: 2005 - present
- Agents: Cent Force (- 2009); Staff-up (2009 - 2011); Oscar Promotion (2011 - 2017); Freelance (2017 -)

Marie Kai (甲斐 まり恵, Kai Marie; born June 13, 1980, in Ichinomiya (now Aso), Aso District, Kumamoto, Japan) is a Japanese actress who has been represented by the talent agencies Cent Force, then Staff-up, then Oscar Promotion, until finally becoming freelance in 2017.

== Filmography ==
=== Television ===
Year	Title	Network	Notes
2006–2009	Yajiuma Plus	TV Asahi	Weather caster
2006	The Suzuki Timerer	tvk	Reporter, Main cast: 5 episodes
2007	Cream Nan Toka	TV Asahi	1 episode
2007	Hihōkan	TV Asahi	1 episode
2008	Utaban	TBS	1 episode
2008	Cinema · Concierge	Star Channel	
2009–2010	Kaiteki TV	SKY Channel	
2010	Miwaku no Fruit Sekai Kaki Road	TV Tokyo	Reporter, 1 episode
2010	Hama-chan ga!	Yomiuri TV	2 episodes
2010	All-Star Thanksgiving	TBS	Television special
2010	Drive A GO!GO!	TV Tokyo	Reporter, 1 episode
2011–2016	Sōdattanoka! Ikegami Akira no Manaberu News	TV Asahi	2 episodes
2012	Rekishi Mystery de Meguru Nagasaki	Tabi Channel	
2015	Saturday Special	TV Asahi	Television special

=== TV series ===
Year	Title	Role	Network	Notes
2009	Ninkyō Helper	Yuka Togawa	Fuji TV	
2010	Totsukawa Keibu Series	Keiko Shinozuka	TBS	
2010	Manbiki G-men Yuki Nikaido	Shizuka	TBS	
2010	Keibu Midorikawa vs. 16-ji 02-bu no Rosen Bus		TBS	
2010	Kamen Rider OOO	Chiyoko Shiraishi	TV Asahi	
2010	Kenji Heihachiro Kishima	Yoko Ohashi	ABC, TV Asahi	
2011	Ryokō Sakka Jirō Chaya 9	Sayoko Ehara	TV Tokyo	
2012	Aibō	Kyoko Sawaguchi	TV Asahi	Season 10, Episode 14
2014	S: Saigo no Keikan	Yuzuru Munakata's mother	TBS	
2014	Shinigami-kun	Kaori Nishijima	TV Asahi	Episode 8
2014	Kateikyōshi ga Hodoku!	Miwako Suzuki	TBS	
2015	Kodoku no Gourmet	Sachiko	TV Asahi	Season 5, Episode 3.
2016	Saijō no Meii	Keiko Shibusawa	TV Tokyo	Television special
2017	Love Hotel no Ueno-san	Saeko	Fuji TV	Episode 4
2021	Kikai Sentai Zenkaiger	Mitsuko Goshikida	TV Asahi	Recurring

=== Films ===
Year	Title	Role	Notes
2010	Kamen Rider × Kamen Rider OOO & W Featuring Skull: Movie War Core	Chiyoko Shiraishi	
2011	Kamen Rider OOO Wonderful: The Shogun and the 21 Core Medals	Chiyoko Shiraishi	
2011	Kamen Rider × Kamen Rider Fourze & OOO: Movie War Mega Max	Chiyoko Shiraishi	
2022	Kamen Rider OOO 10th: Core Medal of Resurrection	Chiyoko Shiraishi	
