= Riho Takada =

Japanese actress and model (born 1994)

- 高田 里穂
- Born: August 16, 1994 (age 32); Kurume, Fukuoka Prefecture, Japan
- Occupations: Actress, model
- Years active: 2007–present
- Agent: Sony Music Artists

Riho Takada (高田 里穂, Takada Riho; born August 16, 1994 in Kurume, Fukuoka Prefecture, Japan) is a Japanese actress and model. She is best known for her role as Hina Izumi in the tokusatsu series Kamen Rider OOO.

== Filmography ==
=== TV series ===
| Year | Title | Role | Notes | Ref. |
|---|---|---|---|---|
| 2010 | Kamen Rider OOO | Hina Izumi | | |
| 2013 | Mischievous Kiss: Love in Tokyo | Sahoko Ohsuki | Episodes 13-16 | |
| 2013 | Limit | Sakura Himesawa | Episodes 1-4 | |
| 2018 | Kamen Rider Zi-O | Hina Izumi | Episodes 9-10 | |
| 2020 | Tokyo Love Story | Naoko Nagasaki | | |
| 2024 | Batsukoi | Kahori Mirumachi | | |
| 2025 | The Reason My Boyfriend Married My Older Sister | Saeko Miyata | Lead role | |

=== Films ===
| Year | Title | Role | Notes | Ref. |
|---|---|---|---|---|
| 2010 | Maria-sama ga Miteru | Shimako Tōdō | | |
| 2010 | Kamen Rider × Kamen Rider OOO & W Featuring Skull: Movie War Core | Hina Izumi | | |
| 2011 | OOO, Den-O, All Riders: Let's Go Kamen Riders | Hina Izumi | | |
| 2011 | Kamen Rider OOO Wonderful: The Shogun and the 21 Core Medals | Hina Izumi | | |
| 2011 | Kamen Rider × Kamen Rider Fourze & OOO: Movie War Mega Max | Hina Izumi | | |
| 2012 | Kamen Rider × Super Sentai: Super Hero Taisen | Hina Izumi | | |
| 2012 | Fashion Story: Model | Hitomi | | |
| 2015 | Ghost Theater | Aoi | | |
| 2016 | Joshikō | Mifuyu Tachibana | | |
| 2018 | Missions of Love | Kawabuchi (Hisame's editor) | | |
| 2019 | Shadowfall | | | |
| 2020 | Grim Reaper Case Book | Murasaki | | |
| 2023 | How to Find a Lover | | | |
| 2025 | 49 nichi no Shinjitsu | Sunny | | |
| 2027 | Kefi | | Lead role | |

=== Dubbing ===
- Brain Games, Cara Santa Maria
