= Shizue Ukaji =

Ainu activist, artist and poet

Shizue Ukaji (宇梶 静江, Ukaji Shizue; born March 13, 1933) is an Ainu activist, artist, and poet.

== Early life ==
Ukaji was born on March 13, 1933, in Urakawa, Hokkaido. She and her siblings grew up without much money, and would skip school and get part-time jobs to help support the family. When she was 20 years old, she moved to Sapporo to attend junior high school, even though she was much older than her classmates. She moved to Tokyo when she was 23, hoping that there would be less discrimination against Ainu there than in Hokkaido. She worked as a waitress, and furthered her education by listening to the college students who came by and reading what they were reading. She later got married and had a son, actor Takashi Ukaji.

== Career ==
Ukaji became an active part of the indigenous rights movement for Ainu people during the 1970s. She petitioned Mayor Ryokichi Minobe for the 1975 survey of the socio-economic conditions of Ainu in Tokyo. The survey found that there were around 600 Ainu households in Tokyo, and many worked blue-collar jobs. A position for an Ainu counselor was made at Shinjuku's Metropolitan Economic Security Office, so that Ainu people could get help finding jobs. Ukaji filled this position for a few months, but stopped because of the intense workload.

During the 1990s Ukaji began studying embroidery. In 1996, she went back to Hokkaido to study traditional Ainu designs and incorporate them in her work. Her work is typically of Ainu legends, which she sews on to kimono fabric like a tapestry. She calls her style "kofu-e" or "old cloth pictures". She also published children's books based on her tapestries.

In 2004 Ukaji was awarded the Ainu Culture Promotion Award.

In 2006, Ukaji helped to produce a film called "Tokyo Ainu" about Ainu people living in Tokyo and the prejudice that they experience when they share their ethnic backgrounds.

Ukaji won the Eiji Yoshikawa Cultural Award in 2011.

== Selected bibliography ==
- Ukaji, Shizue (2006). Nakano, Hideo (ed.). Ainu no haruzō monogatari : Omoi wa kozue kara kozue ni tsunagete. Kamogawa: Ukaji Ryōko. ISBN 4-88621-349-9. OCLC 676560680.
- Ukaji, Shizue (2011). Subete o asu no kate to shite : ima koso Ainu no chie to yūki o (Shohan ed.). Tōkyō: Seiryū Shuppan. ISBN 978-4-86029-362-8. OCLC 730401555.
