= Kōtarō Nakagawa =

Japanese composer and arranger

Kōtarō Nakagawa 中川 幸太郎
- Born: February 7, 1969 (age 57)
- Origin: Japan
- Genres: Anison
- Occupations: Composer, arranger

Kōtarō Nakagawa (中川 幸太郎, Nakagawa Kōtarō; born February 7, 1969) is a Japanese composer and arranger. He is noted for composing the soundtracks for several anime series, including the Gorō Taniguchi-directed productions s-CRY-ed, Planetes, Gun Sword, and Code Geass. He provided the music for many of the Kamen Rider and Super Sentai tokusatsu shows and films.

== Works ==
=== Anime ===
Year	Title	Crew role	Notes	Source
1996	Kiko-chan's Smile	Music		
2000	Geobreeders	Music	2000 special	
2001	s-CRY-ed	Music		
2003–04	Planetes	Music		
2005–07	Fushigiboshi no Futagohime	Music	Also Gyu!	
2005–06	Zoids Genesis	Music		
2005	Gun x Sword	Music, Opening theme song		
2006–08	Code Geass series	Music	2 seasons and OVAs	
2007–09	Hayate the Combat Butler series	Music	2 seasons	
2008–10	Major	Music	seasons 4, 5, 6	
2008–09	Zettai Karen Children: Psychic Squad	Music	Also OVA in 2010	
2008	Major: Yūjō no Winning Shot	Music	feature film	
2009–11	Gokujō!! Mecha Mote Iinchō series	Music, with Junichi "IGAO" Igarashi	2 seasons	
2009	Cross Game	Music		
2009	07 Ghost	Music		
2010–11	Stitch! ~Best Friends Forever~	Music		
2011	Gosick	Music		
2011–14	Chibi Devi!	Music		
2012–13	Inu x Boku SS	Music	Also OVAs	
2012	Scryed	Music	OVA	
2013	Zettai Karen Children: The Unlimited	Music		
2013	Devil Survivor 2: The Animation	Music		
2013	Stella Women's Academy, High School Division Class C³	Music		
2014	Argevollen	Music		
2014	Yu-Gi-Oh! Arc-V	Music		
2015	Prison School	Music		
2015	Chivalry of a Failed Knight	Music		
2016	Active Raid	Music		
2016	Digimon Universe: App Monsters	Music		
2018–20	Major 2nd series	Music	2 seasons	
2022	Birdie Wing: Golf Girls' Story	Music, with Hironori Anazawa		
2022	Fuuto PI	Music, with Shuhei Naruse		
2023	Tōsōchū: The Great Mission	Music		
2023	Classroom for Heroes	Music		

=== Tokusatsu ===
Year	Title	Crew role	Notes	Source
2001	Hyakujuu Sentai Gaoranger	Music	TV series	
2006	GoGo Sentai Boukenger	Music	TV series	
2009	Kamen Rider Decade	Music	TV series	
2009	Kamen Rider Decade: All Riders vs. Dai-Shocker	Music		
2009–10	Kamen Rider W	Music	TV series	
2009	Kamen Rider × Kamen Rider W & Decade: Movie War 2010	Music		
2010	Kamen Rider OOO	Music	TV series	
2010	Kamen Rider × Kamen Rider OOO & W Featuring Skull: Movie War Core	Music		
2011	OOO, Den-O, All Riders: Let's Go Kamen Riders	Music		
2011	Kamen Rider OOO Wonderful: The Shogun and the 21 Core Medals	Music		
2011	Kamen Rider × Kamen Rider Fourze & OOO: Movie War Mega Max	Music		
2012	Kamen Rider × Super Sentai: Super Hero Taisen	Music		
2012–13	Kamen Rider Wizard	Music	TV series	
2012	Kamen Rider × Kamen Rider Wizard & Fourze: Movie War Ultimatum	Music		
2013	Kamen Rider × Super Sentai × Space Sheriff: Super Hero Taisen Z	Music		
2013	Kamen Rider Wizard in Magic Land	Music		
2013	Kamen Rider × Kamen Rider Gaim & Wizard: The Fateful Sengoku Movie Battle	Music		
2014	Heisei Rider vs. Shōwa Rider: Kamen Rider Taisen feat. Super Sentai	Music		
2014	Kamen Rider Drive	Music		
2014	Kamen Rider × Kamen Rider Drive & Gaim: Movie War Full Throttle	Music		

=== Drama ===
Year	Title	Crew role	Notes	Source
1997	Kimi ga Jinsei no Toki (君が人生の時, When You are in Life)	Music		
2004	Botan to Bara (牡丹と薔薇)	Music		
2005	Fuyu no Rinbu (冬の輪舞, Winter Rondo)	Music		
2003	Egao no Housoku (笑顔の法則, Smile of the Law)	Music		
