= Kamen Rider W Forever: A to Z/The Gaia Memories of Fate =

2010 film by Koichi Sakamoto

- Promotional poster alongside Tensou Sentai Goseiger: Epic on the Movie

Japanese name
- Kanji: 仮面ライダーＷ（ダブル） FOREVER AtoZ／運命のガイアメモリ
Transcriptions
- Revised Hepburn: Kamen Raidā Daburu Fōebā Ē tu Zetto/Unmei no Gaia Memori
- Directed by: Koichi Sakamoto
- Written by: Riku Sanjo
- Based on: Kamen Rider W by Riku Sanjo
- Produced by: Ishimori Productions; Toei
- Starring: Renn Kiriyama; Masaki Suda; Hikaru Yamamoto; Minehiro Kinomoto; Mitsuru Matsuoka; Genki Sudo; Aya Sugimoto
- Narrated by: Fumihiko Tachiki
- Cinematography: Koji Kurata
- Edited by: Naoki Osada
- Music by: Shuhei Naruse; Kōtarō Nakagawa
- Production company: Toei
- Distributed by: Toei Co. Ltd
- Release date: August 7, 2010
- Running time: 66 minutes; 86 minutes (Director's Cut)
- Country: Japan
- Language: Japanese

Kamen Rider W Forever: A to Z/The Gaia Memories of Fate (仮面ライダーＷ（ダブル） FOREVER AtoZ／運命のガイアメモリ, Kamen Raidā Daburu Fōebā Ē tu Zetto/Unmei no Gaia Memori) is the second film adaptation of the Kamen Rider W television series, directed by Koichi Sakamoto and released in Japanese theaters on August 7, 2010. It was filmed in 3D, making it the first feature length 3D film in the Kamen Rider franchise. The film's main guest star is Mitsuru Matsuoka of the band Sophia, who stars as the film's antagonist Katsumi Daido / Kamen Rider Eternal; other guest stars include Genki Sudo and Aya Sugimoto. Following the tradition of previous Heisei Kamen Rider movies, Kamen Rider W Forever was released as a double-bill with the Super Sentai franchise film Tensou Sentai Goseiger: Epic on the Movie. Additionally, the protagonist of Kamen Rider OOO makes his first appearance in the film.

Set between episodes 44 and 45 of the series, the film focuses on an invasion organized by the Special Mercenary Force "NEVER" (特殊傭兵部隊NEVER, Tokushu Yōhei Butai Nebā) led by Katsumi, after they discover Foundation X's T2 (Type 2) Gaia Memories (T2（タイプツー）ガイアメモリ, Tī Tsū (Taipu Tsū) Gaia Memori). Assisted by Interpol investigator Maria S. Cranberry, Shotaro Hidari and Philip's investigation into NEVER leads to unforeseen events and secrets being revealed.

== Synopsis ==
After picking up the T2 Gaia Memories from Jun Kazu, (Note: As depicted in the Kamen Rider W episode "The O Chain/Shroud's Confession".) Foundation X agent Tabata leaves the city of Fuuto for his organization's headquarters, only to be attacked by Katsumi Daido, leader of the terrorist organization NEVER, who steals the Eternal Memory and transforms into Kamen Rider Eternal. Tabata activates the Memories' case's self-destruct function, killing himself and scattering the remaining Memories throughout Fuuto while Katsumi reunites with his allies - Kyosui Izumi, Reika Hanehara, Gozo Domoto, and Ken Ashihara - who find four of the Memories and turn into Dopants.

Sometime later, Philip becomes curious about mother-child relationships due to his last encounter with Shroud before witnessing two previously defeated Dopants attacking people. While Philip holds the monsters off, a woman reminiscent of Shroud assists him until his partner Detective Shotaro Hidari arrives so they can transform into Kamen Rider W and defeat the monsters while the Cyclone Dopant saves the civilians. Upon reverting to human form, "Watcherman" and "Santa" reveal they were forcibly transformed by strange Gaia Memories before the woman reappears and claims she is Maria S. Cranberry, an Interpol agent sent to investigate NEVER and the T2 Memories. While comparing notes, Philip becomes intrigued by Maria and believes she is Shroud.

Shotaro, Philip, and their allies recover 17 more T2 Memories, but Hanehara, Izumi, and Domoto attack them until the Cyclone Dopant rescues them. While conducting research into NEVER, Philip discovers its members are actually undead super-soldiers called "Necro-Overs" before receiving a call from Maria telling him to bring the T2 Memories he found to the Fuuto Tower. Philip arrives, but is briefly captured by Katsumi. Philip and an arriving Shotaro fight Katsumi while their ally Ryu Terui fights Ashihara, but the trio are overpowered by their opponents before Katsumi uses the Eternal Memory's power to negate non-T2 Memories, de-powering the trio. Maria reveals herself as the Cyclone Dopant, having found the T2 Cyclone Memory, and her true allegiance with Katsumi to the trio before joining NEVER in converting Fuuto Tower into the X-Bicker device so they can turn Fuuto's citizens into Necro-Overs. While recovering, Terui informs his allies that NEVER is offering a reward for the last missing Memory, which has caused anarchy in Fuuto. Shotaro and Philip argue over whether Maria can be trusted before Philip goes to find her. However, Katsumi reveals she is his mother before knocking Philip out.

Returning to his office, Shotaro finds Kamen Rider Skull leaving behind his Lost Driver, making the former realize Philip wants a family of his own. Hanehara attacks Shotaro again, revealing Katsumi has Philip. In the ensuing struggle, Shotaro finds the last T2 Memory, uses it with the Lost Driver to transform into Kamen Rider Joker, and defeats Hanehara. Joined by Terui, Shotaro heads to Fuuto Tower to save Philip and stop NEVER, defeating Domoto along the way. While Terui fights Izumi and Ashihara, killing the latter in the process, Shotaro finds and reconciles with Philip, but loses his T2 Memory to Katsumi, who uses all of the T2 Memories to activate the X-Bicker. A dying Hanehara returns to beg for Katsumi's help, but he rebuffs her as she and Domoto turn to dust. Outraged by this, Philip destroys the X-Bicker and negates the T2 Memories through willpower before Maria injects Katsumi with an anti-Necro-Over solution. Enraged, he fatally shoots her before escaping to take an antidote. Maria apologizes to Philip for using him and assures him that he can stop Katsumi.

Shotaro and Philip pursue Katsumi, but are stopped by Izumi until Eiji Hino suddenly appears and offers to take their place as Kamen Rider OOO. After Eiji kills Izumi, Shotaro and Philip confront Katsumi, who intends to use the X-Bicker's energy to reactivate the T2 Memories and destroy Fuuto. He knocks the pair off the tower, but they receive a power boost and kill Katsumi. As Fuuto celebrates NEVER's defeat, repairs to Fuuto Tower begin.

== Spin-Offs ==
=== Kamen Rider W Forever: From A to Z, 26 Rapid-Succession Roars of Laughter ===
Following the trend started with Kamen Rider Kiva, 26 comedy-themed shorts (one for every letter of the alphabet) were released online to promote W Forever. Titled Net Movie Kamen Rider W Forever: From A to Z, 26 Rapid-Succession Roars of Laughter (ネット版 仮面ライダーダブル FOREVER AtoZで爆笑26連発, Nettoban Kamen Raidā Daburu Fōebā Ē tu Zetto de Bakushō Nijūrokū Renpatsu), the shorts were released every Friday from July 16, 2010.

There were five different formats for the web movies:

- Artistic Taste Battle in the Narumi Detective Agency (絵心バトルIN鳴海探偵事務所, Egokoro Batoru In Narumi Tantei Jimusho), which features Shotaro, Phillip, Akiko, and Terui in drawing-based trivia contests.
- Shroud's If I Opened a Kamen Rider Academy... Student Akiko (シュラウドの私が仮面ライダーアカデミーを開いたら・・・生徒亜樹子, Shuraudo no Watashi ga Kamen Raidā Akademī o Hiraitara... Seito Akiko): Shroud and Akiko examine where Kamen Rider designs, including a sneak peek at Kamen Rider OOO.
- Professor Jinno and Assistant Makura's Gaia Memory Research (刃野博士と真倉助手のガイアメモリ研究所, Jinno-hakase to Makura-joshu no Gaia Memori Kenkyūjo): Jinno and Makura examine and test different Gaia Memories, including ones that were never fully shown in the TV series (such as Bean and Queen).
- Kirihiko's Room: The Talk Revenge (霧彦の部屋THEトークリベンジ, Kirihiko no Heya Za Tōku Ribenji): Kirihiko (Yuki Kimisawa) talks to the other antagonists of the series in spite of his demise.
- Dopant Medical Practitioner: Shinkuro Isaka (ドーパント開業医・井坂深紅郎, Dōpanto Kaigyōi Isaka Shinkurō): Isaka (Tomoyuki Dan) examines Dopant designs.

=== The Beginning of N/Blood and Dream ===
The short story "The Beginning of N/Blood and Dreams" (Nのはじまり／血と夢, N no Hajimari/Chi to Yume) written by Riku Sanjo and published in Toei Hero Max, Vol. 34, explores NEVER's background and Maria's past as Katsumi's mother Miki Daido (大道 美樹, Daidō Miki). It also introduces Foundation X's top agent Keith Anderson (キース＝アンダーソン, Kīsu Andāson), as well as the Ammonite Dopant (アンモナイト・ドーパント, Anmonaito Dōpanto), the Trilobite Dopant (トリロバイト・ドーパント, Torirobaito Dōpanto), and the Mammoth Dopant (マンモス・ドーパント, Manmosu Dōpanto).

=== Kamen Rider W Returns: Kamen Rider Eternal ===
At a press conference to promote the film, Mitsuru Matsuoka stated that he would like to have a spin-off television series or film focusing on the characters of NEVER some time after the next television series. Later, Katsumi and NEVER returned as part of the Kamen Rider W Returns direct-to-DVD duology. In the second film set after the events of Kamen Rider W Forever, Kamen Rider Eternal, Shotaro and Phillip encounter a young woman with psychic powers who tries to avenge Katsumi's death. Through her, they soon discover the truth behind Katsumi's attack on Fuuto and how he and the NEVER team were once heroes.

== Reception ==
The film opened across 460 screens nationwide—273 2D screens and 187 3D. On its first day of release, the film grossed an estimated ¥140,000,000 and placed second in box offices. The movie grossed ¥331,179,000 and placed third on the weekend charts. 251,270 tickets were sold in total with 115,123 of those being for 3D viewings. The movie received an 4.1 out of 5 aggregate score based on user reviews compiled at Yahoo! Japan.

== Cast ==
- Shotaro Hidari (左 翔太郎, Hidari Shōtarō): Renn Kiriyama (桐山 漣, Kiriyama Ren)
- Philip (フィリップ, Firippu), Young Katsumi Daido: Masaki Suda (菅田 将暉, Suda Masaki)
- Akiko Narumi (鳴海 亜樹子, Narumi Akiko): Hikaru Yamamoto (山本 ひかる, Yamamoto Hikaru)
- Ryu Terui (照井 竜, Terui Ryū): Minehiro Kinomoto (木ノ本 嶺浩, Kinomoto Minehiro)
- Mikio Jinno (刃野 幹夫, Jinno Mikio): Takeshi Nadagi (なだぎ 武, Nadagi Takeshi)
- Shun Makura (真倉 俊, Makura Shun): Shingo Nakagawa (中川 真吾, Nakagawa Shingo)
- Watcherman (ウォッチャマン, Wotchaman): Nasubi (なすび)
- Santa (サンタちゃん, Santa-chan): Zennosuke Fukkin (腹筋 善之介, Fukkin Zennosuke)
- Queen (クイーン, Kuīn): Tomomi Itano (板野 友美, Itano Tomomi)
- Elizabeth (エリザベス, Erizabesu): Tomomi Kasai (河西 智美, Kasai Tomomi)
- Ryubee Sonozaki (園咲 琉兵衛, Sonozaki Ryūbee): Minori Terada (寺田 農, Terada Minori)
- Saeko Sonozaki (園咲 冴子, Sonozaki Saeko): Ami Namai (生井 亜実, Namai Ami)
- Wakana Sonozaki (園咲 若菜, Sonozaki Wakana): Rin Asuka (飛鳥 凛, Asuka Rin)
- Katsumi Daido (大道 克己, Daidō Katsumi): Mitsuru Matsuoka (松岡 充, Matsuoka Mitsuru)
- Maria S. Cranberry (マリア・S・クランベリー, Maria Esu Kuranberī): Aya Sugimoto (杉本 彩, Sugimoto Aya)
- Kyosui Izumi (泉 京水, Izumi Kyōsui): Genki Sudo (須藤 元気, Sudō Genki)
- Reika Hanehara (羽原 レイカ, Hanehara Reika): Minase Yashiro (八代 みなせ, Yashiro Minase)
- Ken Ashihara (葦原 賢, Ashihara Ken): Masayuki Deai (出合 正幸, Deai Masayuki)
- Gozo Domoto (堂本 剛三, Dōmoto Gōzō): Koji Nakamura (中村 浩二, Nakamura Kōji)
- Tabata (田端): Tsunekichi Takeoka (竹岡 常吉, Takeoka Tsunekichi)
- Kurumi Suzumiya (鈴宮 くるみ, Suzumiya Kurumi): Mika Kurosawa (黒沢 美香, Kurosawa Mika)
- Eita (英汰): Shion Sato (佐藤 詩音, Satō Shion)
- Eita's mum: Yūki Ono (小野 友紀, Ono Yūki)
- Narration, Gaia Memory Voice, T2 Gaia Memory Voice: Fumihiko Tachiki (立木 文彦, Tachiki Fumihiko)

Cameos

- Yuko Izumi (和泉 優子, Izumi Yūko): Yurie Senoo (妹尾 友里江, Senoo Yurie)
- Miyabi Kusuhara (楠原 みやび, Kusuhara Miyabi): Nozomi Kawata (川田 希, Kawata Nozomi)
- Asuka Kusuhara (楠原 あすか, Kusuhara Asuka): Rara Omura (大村 らら, Ōmura Rara)
- Chizuru Hoshino (星野 千鶴, Hoshino Chizuru): Reika Fujisawa (藤沢 玲花, Fujisawa Reika)
- Mai Asakawa (浅川 麻衣, Asakawa Mai): Eri Otoguro (乙黒 えり, Otoguro Eri)
- Yuzo Asakawa (浅川 勇三, Asakawa Yūzō): Man Kato (加藤 満, Katō Man)
- Akane Egusa (江草 茜, Egusa Akane): Mana Konno (今野 真菜, Konno Mana)
- Master of Barber "Kaze" (バーバー「風」のマスター, Bābā "Kaze" no Masutā): Isamu Ago (あご 勇, Ago Isamu)
- Jimmy Nakata (ジミー中田, Jimī Nakata): Keisuke Tomita (冨田 佳輔, Tomita Keisuke)
- Yukiho Sumida (墨田 ゆきほ, Sumida Yukiho): Kumiko Nakano (中野 公美子, Nakano Kumiko)
- Lily Shirogane (リリィ白銀, Riryi Shirogane): Nao Nagasawa (長澤 奈央, Nagasawa Nao)
- Frank Shirogane (フランク白銀, Furanku Shirogane): Fubito Yamano (山野 史人, Yamano Fubito)
- Himeka Yukimura (雪村 姫香, Yukimura Himeka): Natsuko Asō (麻生 夏子, Asō Natsuko)
- Professor Akagi (赤城教授, Akagi-kyōju): Fuyuhiko Nishi (西 冬彦, Nishi Fuyuhiko)
- Nagi Shimamoto (島本 凪, Shimamoto Nagi): Miyuu Wagawa (和川 未優, Wagawa Miyū)
- Eiji Hino (火野 映司, Hino Eiji): Shu Watanabe (渡部 秀, Watanabe Shū)
- O Scanner Voice: Akira Kushida (串田 アキラ, Kushida Akira)

== Theme song ==
- "W" (Ｗ（ダブル）, Daburu; "Double")
  - Lyrics & Arrangement: Mitsuru Matsoka
  - Composition: Keiichi Miyako
  - Artist: Mitsuru Matsuoka
  In addition to portraying the character Katsumi Daido, Mitsuru Matsuoka also performs the film's theme song "W", which was set for release as a CD single and limited edition CD+DVD pack on August 11, 2010. The song's music video features footage from the film interspersed between scenes of Matsuoka singing and scenes of a young boy who has found the Jazz Gaia Memory and is later saved from several Masquerade Dopants by Matsuoka.
