= Asaya Kimijima =

Japanese model and actor (born 1987)

- 君嶋 麻耶
- Born: September 8, 1987 (age 38); Kanagawa Prefecture, Japan
- Occupations: Model, actor
- Years active: 2003 - present
- Agent: Stardust Promotion
- Height: 176 cm (5 ft 9 in)

Asaya Kimijima (君嶋 麻耶, Kimijima Asaya; born, September 8, 1987, in Kanagawa Prefecture, Japan) is a Japanese model and actor who is affiliated with Stardust Promotion.

== Filmography ==
=== TV series ===
Year	Title	Role	Network	Other notes
2010	Sunao ni Narenakute		Fuji TV	
2010	Kamen Rider OOO	Shintaro Goto / Kamen Rider Birth / Kamen Rider Birth Prototype	TV Asahi	
2012	Beautiful Rain	Kenta Tachibana	Fuji TV	
2013	Vampire Heaven	Heiei Fuji	TV Tokyo	
2013	Hakuba no Ōji-sama	Takeshi Sakamoto	Yomiuri TV	
2014	Marumo no Okite		Fuji TV	Special 2014

=== Films ===
Year	Title	Role	Other notes
2010	Kamen Rider × Kamen Rider OOO & W Featuring Skull: Movie War Core	Shintaro Goto / Kamen Rider Birth	
2011	Kamen Rider OOO Wonderful: The Shogun and the 21 Core Medals	Shintaro Goto	
2011	Kamen Rider × Kamen Rider Fourze & OOO: Movie War Mega Max	Shintaro Goto / Kamen Rider Birth	
2012	Kamen Rider × Super Sentai: Super Hero Taisen	Kamen Rider Birth (Voice)	
