= Hiroyuki Matsumoto =

Japanese footballer

Personal information
- Full name: Hiroyuki Matsumoto
- Date of birth: July 9, 1989 (age 37)
- Place of birth: Osaka, Japan
- Height: 1.92 m (6 ft 3 1/2 in)
- Position: Goalkeeper

Youth career
- 2008–2011: Kansai University

Senior career*
Years	Team	Apps	(Gls)
2012–2013	Thespakusatsu Gunma	0	(0)
2014	Fujieda MYFC	1	(0)
Total		1	(0)
- * Club domestic league appearances and goals

Hiroyuki Matsumoto (松本 浩幸, Matsumoto Hiroyuki; born July 9, 1989) is a former Japanese football player.

== Playing career ==
Hiroyuki Matsumoto played for Thespakusatsu Gunma and Fujieda MYFC from 2012 to 2014.
