= Hiroaki Iwanaga =

Japanese actor and model

- 岩永 洋昭
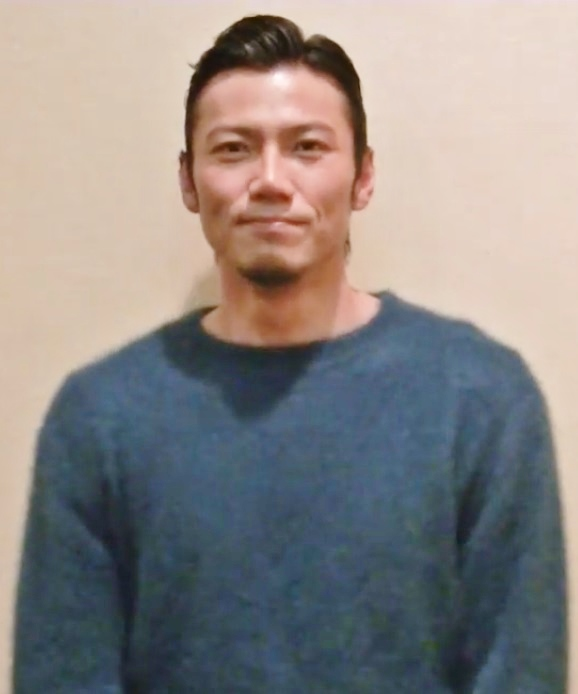
- Born: November 23, 1979 (age 46); Hasami, Higashisonogi District, Nagasaki Prefecture, Japan
- Occupations: Model, actor, voice actor
- Years active: 2000 - present
- Agent: G-Star.Pro
- Height: 1.87 m (6 ft 1 1/2 in)

Hiroaki Iwanaga (岩永 洋昭, Iwanaga Hiroaki; born November 23, 1979) is a Japanese model, actor, and voice actor.

== Filmography ==
=== TV series ===
Year	Title	Role	Other notes	Ref.
2010	Kamen Rider OOO	Akira Date / Kamen Rider Birth / Kamen Rider Birth Prototype		
2022	Hiru	Tirol		

=== Films ===
Year	Title	Role	Other notes	Ref.
2013	Berserk: Golden Age Arc III - The Descent	Guts (voice)	Lead role	
2021	Tears of Persephone	Ōkura		
2023	Divine			
2023	Natchan's Little Secret	Truck driver		
2026	Agito: Psychic War	Rouge		
