= Kamen Rider OOO =

Japanese tokusatsu drama

- Genre: Tokusatsu; Superhero fiction Action; Comedy
- Created by: Shotaro Ishinomori
- Written by: Yasuko Kobayashi
- Directed by: Ryuta Tasaki
- Starring: Shu Watanabe; Ryōsuke Miura; Riho Takada; Asaya Kimijima; Hiroaki Iwanaga; Takashi Ukaji; Mayuko Arisue; Marie Kai; Yu Kamio; Yūsuke Yamada; Taito Hashimoto; Hiroyuki Matsumoto; Honoka Yahagi
- Voices of: Yukana
- Narrated by: Jōji Nakata
- Opening theme: "Anything Goes!" by Maki Ohguro
- Composer: Kōtarō Nakagawa
- Country of origin: Japan
- Original language: Japanese
- No. of episodes: 48 (list of episodes)

Production
- Producers: Kengo Motoi (TV Asahi); Naomi Takebe (Toei); Kazuhiro Takahashi (Toei)
- Running time: 20–25 minutes
- Production companies: Toei Company; Ishimori Productions; TV Asahi Corporation; Asatsu-DK

Original release
- Network: ANN (TV Asahi)
- Release: September 5, 2010 – August 28, 2011

Related
- Kamen Rider W; Kamen Rider Fourze

Kamen Rider OOO (仮面ライダーオーズ(ＯＯＯ), Kamen Raidā Ōzu) is a 2010–2011 Japanese tokusatsu drama in Toei Company's Kamen Rider Series, being the 12th series in the Heisei period run and the 21st overall. It began airing on September 5, 2010, the week following the conclusion of Kamen Rider W, joining Tensou Sentai Goseiger and then Kaizoku Sentai Gokaiger in the Super Hero Time lineup, until its conclusion on August 28, 2011. The series centers around medals, animals, and the themes of desire and greed. The series follows Eiji Hino, who becomes Kamen Rider OOO after obtaining the power of the Core Medals, which are linked to various different animal species and grant him the ability to transform and use various powers.

== Production ==
The Kamen Rider OOO trademark was registered by Toei on April 8, 2010.

OOO is written by Yasuko Kobayashi, known for the screenplays of Seijuu Sentai Gingaman, Mirai Sentai Timeranger, Kamen Rider Ryuki, Den-O, and Samurai Sentai Shinkenger. The creature designers are Yutaka Izubuchi, known for his work on the Lords in Kamen Rider Agito, and Tamotsu Shinohara, known for his work on the Mirror Monsters of Ryuki, the Orphnoch of Kamen Rider 555, and the Fangires of Kamen Rider Kiva.

Unlike several previous Heisei Rider Series, no alternate name has been given yet for the three O's in the title (Ｗ（ダブル） read as "Double" and 555（ファイズ） read as "Φ's/Phi's/Faiz") aside from an alternate spelling of the name of the main Kamen Rider: Ooz. Both "OOO" and "Ooz" are intended to be read as "O's", referring to the multiple uses of the letter O in the title as well as "multiple kings" (王ｓ, Ōzu). The title OOO signifies the three medals that the main Kamen Rider uses to transform as well as being representative of the infinity symbol ($\infty$) with an additional circle.

The 28th episode of Kamen Rider OOO serves as the 1000th episode of the Kamen Rider Series since Kamen Rider premiered on April 3, 1971. The episode was originally set to premiere on March 27, 2011. However, due to the 2011 Tōhoku earthquake and tsunami, the airing of this episode was postponed by one week to April 3, 2011. For the 999th and 1000th episodes, various guest stars with the kanji for thousand (千, chi) in their name were featured: Chiaki, Chisato Morishita, Chinatsu Wakatsuki, and the owarai duo Harisenbon (sen also being Japanese for 1000).

== Story ==
Eiji Hino is a traveling man who has no place to call home and a tragic past. When metallic creatures known as the Greeed awaken after their 800-year slumber to attack humans and feed off of their desires, the disembodied arm of the Greeed named Ankh gives Eiji a belt and three Medals to fight the other Greeed as Kamen Rider OOO. The mysterious Kougami Foundation approaches Eiji and begins assisting him in his fight against the Greeed, though their true motives are not clear. As Eiji fights the Greeed and their Yummy monsters, learning more about the Greeed and Ankh, he starts to find a purpose beyond his journey.

== Episodes ==
Each episode title of Kamen Rider OOO consists of three objects featured in the episode.

No.	Title	Directed by	Written by	Original release date
1	"Medals, Underwear, and a Mysterious Arm"; Transliteration: "Medaru to Pantsu to Nazo no Ude" (Japanese: メダルとパンツと謎の腕)	Ryuta Tasaki	Yasuko Kobayashi	September 5, 2010
2	"Desire, Ice Pops, and Presents"; Transliteration: "Yokubō to Aisu to Purezento" (Japanese: 欲望とアイスとプレゼント)	Ryuta Tasaki	Yasuko Kobayashi	September 12, 2010
3	"A Cat, Evolution, and a Glutton"; Transliteration: "Neko to Shinka to Kuishinbō" (Japanese: ネコと進化と食いしん坊)	Takayuki Shibasaki	Yasuko Kobayashi	September 19, 2010
4	"Doubt, a Picture Message, and a Helping Hand"; Transliteration: "Utagai to Shame to Sukui no Te" (Japanese: 疑いと写メと救いの手)	Takayuki Shibasaki	Yasuko Kobayashi	September 26, 2010
5	"A Game of Tag, a Nest, and a Rich Girl"; Transliteration: "Oikakekko to Su to Serebu" (Japanese: 追いかけっこと巣とセレブ)	Osamu Kaneda	Yasuko Kobayashi	October 3, 2010
6	"Fashion, a Contract, and the Strongest Combo"; Transliteration: "Oyōfuku to Keiyaku to Saikyō Konbo" (Japanese: お洋服と契約と最強コンボ)	Osamu Kaneda	Yasuko Kobayashi	October 10, 2010
7	"A Lousy Husband, a Trap, and a Jackpot"; Transliteration: "Dame Teishu to Wana to Ōatari" (Japanese: ダメ亭主と罠と大当たり)	Satoshi Morota	Yasuko Kobayashi	October 17, 2010
8	"Sabotage, Having No Greed, and Taking a Break"; Transliteration: "Sabori to Muyoku to Kyūkeichū" (Japanese: サボりと無欲と休憩中)	Satoshi Morota	Yasuko Kobayashi	October 24, 2010
9	"Drenched, the Past, and the Scorching Combo"; Transliteration: "Zubunure to Kako to Shakunetsu Konbo" (Japanese: ずぶぬれと過去と灼熱コンボ)	Takayuki Shibasaki	Yasuko Kobayashi	October 31, 2010
10	"A Fist, an Experiment, and a Super Bike"; Transliteration: "Kobushi to Jikken to Chō Baiku" (Japanese: 拳と実験と超バイク)	Takayuki Shibasaki	Yasuko Kobayashi	November 14, 2010
11	"A Traveler, a Swallowtail, and a Celebrity"; Transliteration: "Tabibito to Agehachō to Yūmeijin" (Japanese: 旅人とアゲハ蝶と有名人)	Osamu Kaneda	Shōji Yonemura	November 21, 2010
12	"An Eel, the World, and the Gravity Combo"; Transliteration: "Unagi to Sekai to Jūryoku Konbo" (Japanese: ウナギと世界と重力コンボ)	Osamu Kaneda	Shōji Yonemura	November 28, 2010
13	"A Siamese Cat, Stress, and the Genius Surgeon"; Transliteration: "Shamu-Neko to Sutoresu to Tensai Gekai" (Japanese: シャム猫とストレスと天才外科医)	Hidenori Ishida	Yasuko Kobayashi	December 5, 2010
14	"Pride, Surgery, and a Secret"; Transliteration: "Puraido to Shujutsu to Himitsu" (Japanese: プライドと手術と秘密)	Hidenori Ishida	Yasuko Kobayashi	December 12, 2010
15	"The Medal Struggle, the Transport Truck, and the Container"; Transliteration: "Medaru Sōdatsu to Yusōsha to Utsuwa" (Japanese: メダル争奪と輸送車と器)	Satoshi Morota	Yasuko Kobayashi	December 19, 2010
16	"An End, the Greeed, and a New Rider"; Transliteration: "Shūmatsu to Gurīdo to Shin Raidā" (Japanese: 終末とグリードと新ライダー)	Satoshi Morota	Yasuko Kobayashi	December 26, 2010
17	"The Kendo Girl, Oden, and the Splitting Yummy"; Transliteration: "Kendō Shōjo to Oden to Bunri Yamī" (Japanese: 剣道少女とおでんと分離ヤミー)	Takayuki Shibasaki	Yasuko Kobayashi	January 9, 2011
18	"Destruction, Motives, and the Eel Whip"; Transliteration: "Hakai to Riyū to Unagi Muchi" (Japanese: 破壊と理由とウナギムチ)	Takayuki Shibasaki	Yasuko Kobayashi	January 16, 2011
19	"The Red Medal, the Detective, and Betrayal"; Transliteration: "Akai Medaru to Keiji to Uragiri" (Japanese: 赤いメダルと刑事と裏切り)	Hidenori Ishida	Yasuko Kobayashi	January 23, 2011
20	"A Decoy, the Qualifications, and the Blazing Combo"; Transliteration: "Otori to Shikaku to Honō no Konbo" (Japanese: 囮(おとり)と資格と炎のコンボ)	Hidenori Ishida	Yasuko Kobayashi	January 30, 2011
21	"The Grasshopper, the Father and Son, and the Ally of Justice"; Transliteration: "Batta to Oyako to Seigi no Mikata" (Japanese: バッタと親子と正義の味方)	Ryuta Tasaki	Nobuhiro Mouri	February 6, 2011
22	"Chocolate, Faith, and the Power of Justice"; Transliteration: "Choko to Shinnen to Seigi no Chikara" (Japanese: チョコと信念と正義の力)	Ryuta Tasaki	Nobuhiro Mouri	February 13, 2011
23	"Beauty, the Egg, and the Sleeping Desire"; Transliteration: "Kirei to Tamago to Nemuru Yokubō" (Japanese: キレイと卵と眠る欲望)	Satoshi Morota	Yasuko Kobayashi	February 20, 2011
24	"Memories, Love, and the Ocean Combo"; Transliteration: "Omoide to Koi to Umi no Konbo" (Japanese: 思い出と恋と海のコンボ)	Satoshi Morota	Yasuko Kobayashi	February 27, 2011
25	"The Boxer, the Left Hand, and the Bird Yummy"; Transliteration: "Bokusā to Hidarite to Tori Yamī" (Japanese: ボクサーと左手と鳥ヤミー)	Takayuki Shibasaki	Yasuko Kobayashi	March 6, 2011
26	"Ankh, the Ring, and Putting it All On"; Transliteration: "Anku to Ringu to Zenbu Nose" (Japanese: アンクとリングと全部のせ)	Takayuki Shibasaki	Yasuko Kobayashi	March 20, 2011 (Note: This episode was originally scheduled to air on March 13, 2011, but TV Asahi postponed the airing of this and several other television programs to air news coverage on the Tōhoku earthquake and tsunami.)
27	"1000, a Movie, and the Combatman"; Transliteration: "Sen to Eiga to Sentōin" (Japanese: 1000と映画と戦闘員)	Hidenori Ishida	Shōji Yonemura	March 27, 2011
28	"1000, the Kamen Riders, and the Birthday"; Transliteration: "Sen to Kamen Raidā to Tanjōbi" (Japanese: 1000と仮面ライダーと誕生日)	Hidenori Ishida	Shōji Yonemura	April 3, 2011
29	"The Older Sister, the Doctor, and the Truth About Ankh"; Transliteration: "Ane to Dokutā to Anku no Shinjitsu" (Japanese: 姉と博士(ドクター)とアンクの真実)	Ryuta Tasaki	Yasuko Kobayashi	April 10, 2011
30	"The King, the Panda, and the Blazing Memory"; Transliteration: "Ō to Panda to Honō no Kioku" (Japanese: 王とパンダと炎の記憶)	Ryuta Tasaki	Yasuko Kobayashi	April 17, 2011
31	"Returning the Favor, the Plan, and the Purple Medals"; Transliteration: "Ongaeshi to Takurami to Murasaki no Medaru" (Japanese: 恩返しとたくらみと紫のメダル)	Satoshi Morota	Yasuko Kobayashi	April 24, 2011
32	"A New Greeed, Desire, and the Invincible Combo"; Transliteration: "Shin Gurīdo to Kūhaku to Muteki no Konbo" (Japanese: 新グリードと空白と無敵のコンボ)	Satoshi Morota	Yasuko Kobayashi	May 1, 2011
33	"Friendship, Chaos, and the Belt Left Behind"; Transliteration: "Yūjō to Bōsō to Nokosareta Beruto" (Japanese: 友情と暴走と残されたベルト)	Hidenori Ishida	Nobuhiro Mouri	May 8, 2011
34	"The Close Friend, the Use, and This Connection"; Transliteration: "Shin'yū to Riyō to Sono Kankei" (Japanese: 親友と利用とその関係)	Hidenori Ishida	Nobuhiro Mouri	May 15, 2011
35	"The Dream, the Brother, and Birth's Secret"; Transliteration: "Yume to Ani to Bāsu no Himitsu" (Japanese: 夢と兄とバースの秘密)	Ryuta Tasaki	Nobuhiro Mouri	May 22, 2011
36	"Broken Dreams, the Body, and the Greeed Resurrection"; Transliteration: "Kowareta Yume to Karada to Gurīdo Fukkatsu" (Japanese: 壊れた夢と身体とグリード復活)	Ryuta Tasaki	Nobuhiro Mouri	May 29, 2011
37	"Sleep, One Hundred Million, and the Birth Transfer"; Transliteration: "Nemuri to Ichioku to Bāsu Tenshoku" (Japanese: 眠りと1億とバース転職)	Satoshi Morota	Yasuko Kobayashi	June 5, 2011
38	"The Circumstances, a Farewell, and the Tearful Birth"; Transliteration: "Jijō to Wakare to Namida no Bāsu" (Japanese: 事情と別れと涙のバース)	Satoshi Morota	Yasuko Kobayashi	June 12, 2011
39	"The Nightmare, Security Cameras, and Ankh's Revenge"; Transliteration: "Akumu to Kanshi Kamera to Anku no Gyakushū" (Japanese: 悪夢と監視カメラとアンクの逆襲)	Hidenori Ishida	Yasuko Kobayashi	June 26, 2011
40	"Control, a Birthday Party, and the Disappearing Ankh"; Transliteration: "Shihai to Tanjōkai to Kieru Anku" (Japanese: 支配と誕生会と消えるアンク)	Hidenori Ishida	Yasuko Kobayashi	July 3, 2011
41	"Siblings, the Rescue, and Eiji Leaves"; Transliteration: "Kyōdai to Kyūshutsu to Eiji Saru" (Japanese: 兄妹と救出と映司去る)	Kenzo Maihara	Yasuko Kobayashi	July 10, 2011
42	"Ice, Greeedification, and Broken Wings"; Transliteration: "Kōri to Gurīdo-ka to Kudaketa Tsubasa" (Japanese: 氷とグリード化と砕けた翼)	Kenzo Maihara	Yasuko Kobayashi	July 17, 2011
43	"The Vulture, the Confrontation, and Ankh Returns"; Transliteration: "Hagetaka to Tairitsu to Anku Ritānzu" (Japanese: ハゲタカと対立とアンクリターンズ)	Takayuki Shibasaki	Yasuko Kobayashi	July 24, 2011 (Note: This episode was the final Kamen Rider episode to air on analog television in most of Japan. Analog television broadcasts ceased at noon that day.)
44	"Everyone Together, the Perfect Resurrection, and Your Greed"; Transliteration: "Zen'in Shūgō to Kanzen Fukkatsu to Kimi no Yoku" (Japanese: 全員集合と完全復活と君の欲)	Takayuki Shibasaki	Yasuko Kobayashi	July 31, 2011
45	"The Surprise Attack, the Proto Birth, and the Desire of Love"; Transliteration: "Kishū to Puroto Bāsu to Ai no Yokubō" (Japanese: 奇襲とプロトバースと愛の欲望)	Satoshi Morota	Yasuko Kobayashi	August 7, 2011
46	"The Eiji Greeed, the Double Births, and Ankh's Desire"; Transliteration: "Eiji Gurīdo to Daburu Bāsu to Anku no Yokubō" (Japanese: 映司グリードとWバースとアンクの欲望)	Satoshi Morota	Yasuko Kobayashi	August 14, 2011
47	"The Red Crack, the Satisfaction, and Eiji's Vessel"; Transliteration: "Akai Hibi to Manzoku to Eiji no Utsuwa" (Japanese: 赤いヒビと満足と映司の器)	Ryuta Tasaki	Yasuko Kobayashi	August 21, 2011
48	"Tomorrow's Medals, Underwear, and Arms Held"; Transliteration: "Ashita no Medaru to Pantsu to Tsukamu Ude" (Japanese: 明日のメダルとパンツと掴む腕)	Ryuta Tasaki	Yasuko Kobayashi	August 28, 2011

== Films ==
Kamen Rider OOO made his first appearance as a cameo in the film Kamen Rider W Forever: A to Z/The Gaia Memories of Fate.

=== Movie War Core ===
After the end credits of W Forever, a short teaser featuring Kamen Rider Double and Kamen Rider OOO stated that there would be a crossover film featuring both series' characters, much like Kamen Rider × Kamen Rider W & Decade: Movie War 2010. It is titled Kamen Rider × Kamen Rider OOO & W Featuring Skull: Movie War Core (仮面ライダー×仮面ライダー オーズ&ダブル feat. スカル MOVIE大戦CORE, Kamen Raidā × Kamen Raidā Ōzu Ando Daburu fīto. Sukaru Mūbī Taisen Koa). As part of it, OOO's film Kamen Rider OOO: Nobunaga's Desire (仮面ライダーオーズ ノブナガの欲望, Kamen Raidā Ōzu Nobunaga no Yokubō) opened in Japanese theaters on December 18, 2010. The events of the movie take place between episodes 12 and 13.

=== Let's Go Kamen Riders ===
OOO, Den-O, All Riders: Let's Go Kamen Riders (オーズ・電王・オールライダー レッツゴー仮面ライダー, Ōzu Den'ō Ōru Raidā Rettsu Gō Kamen Raidā), released on April 1, 2011, commemorates the 40th anniversary of the Kamen Rider Series featuring the cast and characters of Kamen Rider Den-O, Kamen Rider OOO, and other characters from the past franchise series. The event of the movie took place between episode 26 and 27.

=== The Shogun and the 21 Core Medals ===
Kamen Rider OOO Wonderful the Movie: The Shogun and the 21 Core Medals (劇場版 仮面ライダーオーズ WONDERFUL 将軍と21のコアメダル, Gekijōban Kamen Raidā Ōzu Wandāfuru Shōgun to Nijū-ichi no Koa Medaru) is the main theatrical release for Kamen Rider OOO, released on August 6, 2011, alongside Kaizoku Sentai Gokaiger the Movie: The Flying Ghost Ship. It also features the first on-screen appearance of Kamen Rider Fourze, portrayed by Sota Fukushi as Gentaro Kisaragi, and Fumika Shimizu as Yuki Jojima. The events of the movie take place between episodes 36 and 37.

=== Movie War Mega Max ===
A crossover film between Kamen Rider OOO and Kamen Rider Fourze in the same vein as the Movie War 2010 and Movie War Core films, titled Kamen Rider × Kamen Rider Fourze & OOO: Movie War Mega Max (仮面ライダー×仮面ライダー フォーゼ&オーズ MOVIE大戦MEGA MAX, Kamen Raidā × Kamen Raidā Fōze Ando Ōzu Mūbī Taisen Mega Makkusu), was released on December 10, 2011, in Japan.

=== Super Hero Taisen ===
Kamen Rider × Super Sentai: Super Hero Taisen (仮面ライダー×スーパー戦隊 スーパーヒーロー大戦, Kamen Raidā × Sūpā Sentai Sūpā Hīrō Taisen) is a film which features a crossover between the characters of the Kamen Rider and Super Sentai Series. The protagonists of Kamen Rider Decade and Kaizoku Sentai Gokaiger were featured, but the casts of Kamen Rider Fourze, Kamen Rider OOO, and Tokumei Sentai Go-Busters also participated. Shu Watanabe and Riho Takada reprise their roles as Eiji Hino and Hina Izumi, while Asaya Kimijima and Hiroaki Iwanaga reprise their roles as the voices of Kamen Rider Birth and Kamen Rider Birth Prototype respectively.

=== Movie War Ultimatum ===
Kamen Rider × Kamen Rider Wizard & Fourze: Movie War Ultimatum (仮面ライダー×仮面ライダー ウィザード&フォーゼ MOVIE大戦アルティメイタム, Kamen Raidā × Kamen Raidā Wizādo Ando Fōze Mūbī Taisen Arutimeitamu) was released on December 8, 2012, as the annual winter "Movie War" film. Shu Watanabe made a cameo appearance, reprising his role as Eiji Hino in the Movie War Ultimatum portion of the film.

=== Heisei Generations Final ===
A Movie War film, titled Kamen Rider Heisei Generations Final: Build & Ex-Aid with Legend Rider (仮面ライダー平成ジェネレーションズ FINAL ビルド&エグゼイドwithレジェンドライダー, Kamen Raidā Heisei Jenerēshonzu Fainaru Birudo Ando Eguzeido Wizu Rejendo Raidā) was released on December 9, 2017. Alongside the casts of Kamen Rider Build and Kamen Rider Ex-Aid, Shu Watanabe and Ryōsuke Miura reprise their roles as Eiji Hino and Ankh.

== Video games ==
- A third port of Kamen Rider: Climax Heroes titled Kamen Rider: Climax Heroes OOO (仮面ライダー クライマックスヒーローズ オーズ, Kamen Raidā Kuraimakkusu Hīrōzu Ōzu) was released on both the PlayStation Portable and Nintendo Wii on December 2, 2010. In addition to adding Kamen Rider OOO to the game, the previous Heisei Riders' most powerful forms (e.g., Kuuga Ultimate Form & Double CycloneJokerXtreme) have been added as playable characters as well as other Heisei Kamen Riders not included in either of the two previous versions.
- Kamen Rider: Memory of Heroez is a 3D action game, which was released on October 29, 2020 for PlayStation 4 and Nintendo Switch. It features the cast from Kamen Rider OOO, W, and Zero-One, whereas Kamen Riders OOO and Birth (both complete (Goto) and prototype (Date) versions) as playable characters. Instead of being reprised by Shu Watanabe, Asaya Kimijima and Hiroaki Iwanaga however, OOO and both Birth will be voiced by Tatsuhisa Suzuki, Soma Saito and Tomoaki Maeno respectively.

== Hyper Battle DVD ==
Kamen Rider OOO Hyper Battle DVD: Quiz, Dance, and Takagarooba!? (仮面ライダーオーズ ハイパーバトルDVD クイズとダンスとタカガルバ, Kamen Raidā Ōzu Haipā Batoru Dī Bui Dī Kuizu to Dansu to Takagaruba) was released alongside an issue of Televi-Kun magazine. The DVD featured the Kangaroo Medal, which was used by Kamen Rider OOO to transform either his arms or legs to have kangaroo-themed powers.

"Kangaroo Dance" is a song used in the Hyper Battle DVD featuring Akira Kushida chanting "Kangaroo" in the background with composition & arrangement from Shuhei Naruse.

== Final Episode ==
Kamen Rider OOO: Final Episode (仮面ライダーオーズ FINAL EPISODE, Kamen Raidā Ōzu Fainaru Episōdo) is the director's cut version of the last two episodes of Kamen Rider OOO put together. It was released on DVD and Blu-ray on February 21, 2012.

== V-Cinema ==
Kamen Rider OOO 10th: Core Medal of Resurrection (仮面ライダーオーズ 10th 復活のコアメダル, Kamen Raidā Ōzu Jusshū'nen Fukkatsu no Koa Medaru) is a V-Cinema release which received a limited theatrical release on March 12, 2022, followed by its DVD and Blu-ray release on August 24, 2022. The events of the V-Cinema take place ten years after the TV series. The V-Cinema is written by Nobuhiro Mouri and directed by Ryuta Tasaki, and its theme song is "Anything Goes! OOO 10th Mix" performed by Maki Ohguro.

== Internet spin-offs ==
- Kamen Rider OOO (ネット版 仮面ライダーオーズ, Netto-ban Kamen Raidā Ōzu) is a web-exclusive series released on Toei Tokusatsu Fan Club on March 13, 2022 that serve as prequels to Kamen Rider OOO 10th: Core Medal of Resurrection.
  - Core Medal of Resurrection: Prologue (復活のコアメダル・序章, Fukkatsu no Koa Medaru Joshō)
  - Birth of Birth X: Prologue (バースX誕生・序章, Bāsu Ekkusu Tanjō Joshō)
- OOO 10th Kamen Rider Birth: Secret Story of the Birth of Birth X (オーズ10th 仮面ライダーバース バースX誕生秘話, Ōzu Jusshū'nen Kamen Raidā Bāsu Bāsu Ekkusu Tanjō Hiwa) is a web-exclusive series released on Toei Tokusatsu Fan Club on July 3, 2022 that serves to connect Core Medal of Resurrection and Birth of Birth X: Prologue. The theme song is "Anything Goes! Happy 10th ver." performed by Eiji Hino × Ankh × Hina Izumi (Shu Watanabe, Ryōsuke Miura, & Riho Takada).

== Novel ==
Novel: Kamen Rider OOO (小説 仮面ライダーオーズ, Shōsetsu Kamen Raidā Ōzu), written by Nobuhiro Mouri, is part of a series of spin-off novel adaptions of the Heisei Era Kamen Riders. The novel is split into three parts. The first part focuses on the origin of the Core Medals, the King, and the Greeeds from Ankh's point of view and reveals secrets unanswered from the series. The second part takes on the Birth Driver's point of view, deciding between Akira Date and Shintaro Goto to see who is worthy to use it. The final part focuses on Eiji's past and reveals how he met Alfreed. The novel was released on November 30, 2012.

== Cast ==
- Eiji Hino (火野 映司, Hino Eiji): Shu Watanabe (渡部 秀, Watanabe Shū)
- Ankh (アンク, Anku), Shingo Izumi (泉 信吾, Izumi Shingo): Ryōsuke Miura (三浦 涼介, Miura Ryōsuke)
- Hina Izumi (泉 比奈, Izumi Hina): Riho Takada (高田 里穂, Takada Riho)
- Shintaro Goto (後藤 慎太郎, Gotō Shintarō): Asaya Kimijima (君嶋 麻耶, Kimijima Asaya)
- Akira Date (伊達 明, Date Akira): Hiroaki Iwanaga (岩永 洋昭, Iwanaga Hiroaki)
- Erika Satonaka (里中 エリカ, Satonaka Erika): Mayuko Arisue (有末 麻祐子, Arisue Mayuko)
- Chiyoko Shiraishi (白石 千世子, Shiraishi Chiyoko), Hitomi Maki (真木 仁美, Maki Hitomi; 30): Marie Kai (甲斐 まり恵, Kai Marie)
- Kousei Kougami (鴻上 光生, Kōgami Kōsei): Takashi Ukaji (宇梶 剛士, Ukaji Takashi)
- Kiyoto Maki (真木 清人, Maki Kiyoto): Yuu Kamio (神尾 佑, Kamio Yū)
- Kazari (カザリ): Taito Hashimoto (橋本 汰斗, Hashimoto Taito)
- Uva (ウヴァ): Yūsuke Yamada (山田 悠介, Yamada Yūsuke)
- Gamel (ガメル, Gameru): Hiroyuki Matsumoto (松本 博之, Matsumoto Hiroyuki)
- Mezool (Human State) (メズール（人間形態）, Mezūru (Ningen Keitai)): Honoka Miki (未来 穂香, Miki Honoka)
- Ankh (Lost) (Human State) (アンク（ロスト）（人間形態）, Anku (Rosuto) (Ningen Keitai)): Hikari Tobita (飛田 光里, Tobita Hikari)

=== Voice cast ===
- Mezool (メズール, Mezūru): Yukana (ゆかな)
- Ankh (Lost) (アンク（ロスト）, Anku (Rosuto)): Miyu Irino (入野 自由, Irino Miyu)
- O-Scanner (オースキャナー, Ō Sukyanā), Medagabryu (メダガブリュー, Medagaburyū): Akira Kushida (串田 アキラ, Kushida Akira)
- Birth Driver (バースドライバー, Bāsu Doraibā), Birth Buster (バースバスター, Bāsu Basutā), Narrator: Jōji Nakata (中田 譲治, Nakata Jōji)

=== Guest cast ===
- Monta Haradoki (腹時 門太, Haradoki Monta; 3–4): Jubun Fukuzawa (福沢 重文, Fukuzawa Jūbun)
- Takeshi Komori (小森 武, Komori Takeshi; 7–8): Kiyohiko Shibukawa (渋川 清彦, Shibukawa Kiyohiko)
- Momoko Komori (小森 桃子, Momoko Komori; 7–8): Tamae Ando (安藤 玉恵, Andō Tamae)
- Tooru Tadano (只野通, Tadano Tooru; 9–10): Makoto Sakamoto (坂本 真, Sakamoto Makoto)
- Boy (10): Fuku Suzuki (鈴木 福, Suzuki Fuku)
- Hospital's director (13–14): Akira Hamada (浜田 晃, Hamada Akira)
- Masaru Hashimoto (橋本 勝, Hashimoto Masaru; 17–18): Mitsuomi Takahashi (高橋 光臣, Takahashi Mitsuomi)
- Toichi Yamagane (山金 トイチ, Yamagane Toichi; 19–20): Donpei Tsuchihira (土平 ドンペイ, Tsuchihira Donpei)
- Yasuji Okumura (奥村 安二, Okumura Yasuji; 19–20): Shinji Rokkaku (六角 慎司, Rokkaku Shinji)
- Yumi Sakura (佐倉 優美, Sakura Yumi; 23–24): Erena (英玲奈)
- Female bikers (27): Chiaki (千秋), Chisato Morishita (森下 千里, Morishita Chisato)
- Female fan (28): Chinatsu Wakatsuki (若槻 千夏, Wakatsuki Chinatsu)
- Shocker Combatmen (28): Harisenbon (ハリセンボン)
  - Haruka Minowa (箕輪 はるか, Minowa Haruka)
  - Haruna Kondo (近藤 春菜, Kondō Haruna)
- Kosuke Sakata (坂田 浩介, Sakata Kōsuke; 31–32): Bandō Minosuke II (二代目 坂東 巳之助, Nidaime Bandō Minosuke)
- Doctor Fujita (藤田医師, Fujita-ishi; 32, 37): Akira Kubodera (窪寺 昭, Kubodera Akira)
- Kentaro Sawaguchi (沢口 健太郎, Sawaguchi Kentarō; 35): Shigeki Kagemaru (影丸 茂樹, Kagemaru Shigeki)
- Gonzo Shimoda (下田 権造, Shimoda Gonzō; 39–40): Shihou Harumi (春海 四方, Harumi Shihō)
- Kusada (草田; 43): Goshu (剛州)
- Kengo Utahoshi (歌星 賢吾, Utahoshi Kengo; 48): Ryuki Takahashi (高橋 龍輝, Takahashi Ryūki)
- Yuki Jojima (城島 ユウキ, Jōjima Yūki; 48): Fumika Shimizu (清水 富美加, Shimizu Fumika)

== International Releases ==
- In the Philippines, it was aired on GMA Network from 2014 to 2015 with a Tagalog dub.

== Songs ==
Opening theme

- "Anything Goes!"
  - Lyrics: Shoko Fujibayashi
  - Composition: Tatsuo (of everset and Galveston 19)
  - Arrangement: Tatsuo & Kōtarō Nakagawa
  - Artist: Maki Ohguro (大黒 摩季, Ōguro Maki)
  "Anything Goes!" was released on November 17, 2010, as a standard CD and a CD+DVD combo pack. The rapping on the song was performed by Rah-D, who provided his vocal talent in some of the show's background music.
  A balladic version of the song titled "Anything Goes! Ballad" was played during the finale of Kamen Rider OOO. Ohguro stated that she thought that the song would also work as a slow ballad, especially after she has been watching how the series has progressed, and recorded the song during her hiatus from releases. The balladic version was released as a single on December 7, 2011.

Insert themes
Each of the series' various insert themes are titled in such a way to resemble the Kamen Rider OOO Combo that they serve as the theme for. The songs also feature Akira Kushida, the voice for the OOO Driver, chanting the name of the combo throughout the song. Ayano, a session guitarist for many of the recent Kamen Rider Series songs and member of the "Tsuyoshi & Ayano" group from the Kamen Rider W radio show, performs guitars on all of the tracks.

- "Regret nothing ~Tighten Up~"
  - Lyrics: Shoko Fujibayashi
  - Composition & Arrangement: Shuhei Naruse
  - Artist: Eiji Hino (Shu Watanabe)
  - Episodes: 5, 7, 13
  "Regret nothing ~Tighten Up~" was recorded throughout late September 2010 and recording completed on October 2, 2010. Shuhei Naruse was the song's producer and it was sung by Shu Watanabe under the name of his character Eiji Hino. It was first used in the October 3, 2010, episode. The pronunciation of "Tighten Up" is intended to mimic the pronunciation of "Tatoba". When played during scenes with other Combos, the "Tatoba" chant is removed from the song. The single for "Regret nothing ~Tighten Up~" features a ska arrangement by trombone player Eijiro Nakagawa.
- "Got to keep it real"
  - Lyrics: Shoko Fujibayashi
  - Composition & Arrangement: Shuhei Naruse
  - Artist: Eiji Hino (Shu Watanabe)
  - Episodes: 6, 16, Movie War Core
  The title of "Got to keep it real", Gatakiriba Combo's theme song, was revealed on Shu Watanabe's official blog on Gree.jp. The chorus features Sunaho of Labor Day. The single for "Got to keep it real" features a trance arrangement by Yoichi Sakai.
- "Ride on Right time"
  - Lyrics: Shoko Fujibayashi
  - Composition & Arrangement: Shuhei Naruse
  - Artist: Eiji Hino (Shu Watanabe)
  - Episodes: 9–10, 15, 40, 42, 45
  "Ride on Right time" is Latorartar Combo's theme song. The additional rap vocals are by Tsuyoshi Himura, the Tsuyoshi of "Tsuyoshi & Ayano". The single for "Ride on Right time" features a "mixture" arrangement by Shamo and Florida Keys member Junichi "Igao" Igarashi.
- "Sun goes up"
  - Lyrics: Shoko Fujibayashi
  - Composition & Arrangement: Shuhei Naruse
  - Artist: Eiji Hino (Shu Watanabe)
  - Episodes: 12
  "Sun goes up" is Sagohzo Combo's theme song. The chorus featured Mr. Rah-D.
- "Time judged all"
  - Lyrics: Shoko Fujibayashi
  - Composition & Arrangement: Shuhei Naruse
  - Artist: Eiji Hino × Ankh (Shu Watanabe & Ryōsuke Miura)
  - Episodes: 20, 22–23, 25, 28, 48
  On January 12, 2011, Shu Watanabe announced on his Gree blog that he was recording a new song for OOO, specifically for the "red bird guy" (赤い鳥のヤツ, akai tori no yatsu). The song has since been revealed to be titled "Time judged all", the theme for Tajadol Combo, and is a duet with Ryosuke Miura as Ankh. The song features Hyuga Rei and Mami Yanagi performing in the chorus, chanting in German. The "Full Combo Collection" album features a "dialogue" version as a bonus track.
- "Shout out"
  - Lyrics: Shoko Fujibayashi
  - Composition & Arrangement: Shuhei Naruse
  - Artist: Eiji Hino (Shu Watanabe)
  "Shout out" was first announced on April 17, 2011, by DJ HURRY KENN on the OOO Internet radio show, where he said the song for Shauta Combo would have a "Double-Action Rod form"-like feel, The song was played on the radio show, however it was never played in the series. Kaori Nagura of Kamen Rider Girls joins in the chorus.
- "POWER to TEARER"
  - Lyrics: Shoko Fujibayashi
  - Composition & Arrangement: Shuhei Naruse
  - Artist: Eiji Hino (Shu Watanabe) & Akira Kushida
  - Episodes: 36, 44
  "POWER to TEARER", the theme song for Putotyra Combo, is the first song that Akira Kushida was featured on the main vocals.
- "Reverse/Re:birth"
  - Lyrics: Shoko Fujibayashi
  - Composition & Arrangement: tatsuo (everset)
  - Artist: Akira Date & Shintaro Goto (Hiroaki Iwanaga & Asaya Kimijima)
  - Episodes: 38, 46–47
  "Reverse/Re:birth" is Kamen Rider Birth's theme song. The music video for the song features Hiroaki Iwanaga as Akira Date, Asaya Kimijima as Shintaro Goto, and Mayuko Arisue as Erika Satonaka.

Other

- "Let's Go!! Rider Kick" (レッツゴー!!ライダーキック, Rettsu Gō!! Raidā Kikku)
  - Lyrics: Shotaro Ishinomori
  - Composition & Arrangement: Shunsuke Kikuchi
  - Artist: Kōichi Fuji
  - Episodes: 27
  For the commemoration of the 1000th episode of the Kamen Rider Series, the original "Let's Go!! Rider Kick" was featured during the episode.
- "WIND WAVE"
  - Lyrics: Tsuyoshi
  - Composition: Ayano
  - Artist: Tsuyoshi & Ayano
  - Episodes: 35
  Tsuyoshi and Ayano of the Kamen Rider W Internet show Head Wind: One-Game Match!! have a cameo appearance as street musicians, Michibata Lion (路端ライオン, Michibata Raion), in episode 35 where they perform their radio show's theme song "WIND WAVE".

The first soundtrack for Kamen Rider OOO was released on November 17, 2010; it includes an edit of the series' opening theme "Anything Goes!". The second soundtrack was released on June 22, 2011. The Kamen Rider OOO: Full Combo Collection album was released on July 27, 2011, debuting at number 8 on its day of release on Oricon's daily album ranking.

DJ HURRY KENN announced on Twitter that Kamen Rider OOO's "final song" would be recorded on July 18, 2011.
