= Shuhei Naruse =

Japanese composer

Shuhei Naruse (Japanese: 鳴瀬 シュウヘイ, Hepburn: Naruse Shūhei) is a Japanese musician, composer, and music arranger from Kyoto Prefecture. Naruse attended Ritsumeikan University. His major debut as a musician was in the rock band DEVELOP=FRAME where he played keyboards. He has since worked on the composition and arrangement for various Avex Trax musical artists, including the soundtracks of Kamen Rider Den-O, Kamen Rider Kiva, and Kamen Rider Fourze.

He also composed the soundtracks for the anime series MegaMan NT Warrior, Mega Man Star Force, and Sket Dance.

For his work on Kamen Rider Kiva, he plays keyboard in the "limited rock unit" Tetra-Fang as SHUHEI.
