= Maki (name) =

- Gender: Female (unisex)

Origin
- Origin: Japanese
- Meaning: It can have many different meanings depending on the kanji used.

Other names
- Related names: Makiko

Maki (まき, マキ) is a very common feminine Japanese given name which can also be used as a surname.

Maki can be written using different kanji characters and can mean (the list is not exhaustive):

as a given name

- 真貴, "true, precious"
- 真樹, "true, timber trees"
- 真紀, "true, chronicle"
- 真希, "true, hope"
- 麻紀, "linen, chronicle"
- 麻貴, "linen, precious"

The given name can also be written in hiragana or katakana.

as a surname

- 巻, "roll"
- 槙, "evergreen tree"
- 槇, "yew plum pine"
- 牧, "herd"
- 真木, "true, tree"

== People ==
=== Given name ===
==== Women ====
- Mākii (マーキー; born 1987), known as Maki Onaga, Japanese musician
- Maki Arai (新井 麻葵; born 1982), Japanese tennis player
- Maki Asakawa (浅川 マキ; 1942–2010), Japanese jazz and blues singer, lyricist and composer
- Maki Carrousel (カルーセル 麻紀; born 1942), Japanese transgender actress
- Maki Eguchi (江口 真紀; born 1978), Japanese former basketball player
- Maki Enjōji (円城寺 マキ), Japanese manga artist
- Maki Fujiyoshi (藤好 麻希; born 1974), Japanese former volleyball player
- Maki Goto (後藤 真希; born 1985), Japanese singer, lyricist, and former actress
- Maki Hanatani (花谷 麻妃; born 2002), Japanese singer and voice actress
- Maki Haneta (埴田 真紀; born 1972), Japanese former football player
- Maki Horikita (堀北 真希; born 1988), Japanese former actress
- Maki Ichiro (路 真輝; born 1965), Japanese actress
- Maki Ikeda (池田 真紀; born 1972), Japanese politician
- Maki Ito (伊藤 槙紀; born 1984), Japanese para table tennis player
- Maki Itoh (伊藤 麻希; born 1995), Japanese professional wrestler
- Maki Kashimada (鹿島田 真希; born 1976), Japanese writer
- Maki Kawai (川合 眞紀; born 1952), Japanese chemist
- Maki Kawamura (川村 真樹; born 1979), Japanese ballerina
- Maki Kashimada (鹿島田 真希; born 1976), Japanese writer
- Maki Kawase (河瀬 茉希; born 1995), Japanese voice actress
- Maki Kenjo (born 1970), Japanese former cricketer
- Maki Kitahara (北原 槙; born 2009), Japanese professional footballer
- Maki Kobayashi (小林 眞樹; born 1965), Japanese rower
- Maki Kusumoto (楠本 まき; born 1967), Japanese manga artist
- Maki Matsumoto (actress) (松本 麻希; born 1973), Japanese actress
- Maki Matsumoto (announcer) (松本 真季; born 1996), Japanese television announcer
- Maki Meguro (目黒 真希; born 1972), Japanese actress
- Maki Minami (南 マキ), Japanese manga author
- Maki Mita (三田 真希; born 1983), Japanese swimmer
- Maki Miyamae (宮前 真樹; born 1973), Japanese pop singer
- Maki Mizuno (水野 真紀; born 1970), Japanese actress
- Maki Mori (announcer) (森 麻季; born 1981), Japanese announcer
- Maki Mori (soprano) (森 麻季; born 1970), Japanese soprano
- Maki Murakami (村上 真紀), Japanese manga artist
- Maki Muraki (村木 真紀; born 1974), Japanese LGBTQ activist
- Maki Namekawa (滑川 真希), Japanese pianist
- Maki Narumiya (成宮 真希; born 1985), Japanese retired professional wrestler
- Maki Nishiyama (西山 茉希; born 1985), Japanese model and actress
- Maki Nomiya (野宮 真貴; born 1960), Japanese singer and musician
- Maki Ohguro (大黒 摩季; born 1969), Japanese pop singer and songwriter
- Maki Okada (岡田 真紀), Japanese Paralympic athlete
- Maki Okazoe (岡副 麻希; born 1992), Japanese TV announcer, news presenter and tarento
- Maki Otsuki (大槻 マキ; born 1973), Japanese singer and musician
- Maki Sakaguchi (阪口 真紀; born 1989), Japanese field hockey player
- Maki Sakai (坂井 真紀; born 1970), Japanese actress
- Maki Shiomi (塩見 真希; born 2000), Japanese table tennis player
- Maki Tabata (田畑 真紀; born 1974), Japanese speed skater and track cyclist
- Maki Takada (髙田 真希; born 1989), Japanese basketball player
- Maki Takano (高野 眞希; born 1995), Japanese rugby union player
- Maki Tsuji (辻 麻希; born 1985), Japanese speed skater
- Maki Tsukada (塚田 真希; born 1982), Japanese judoka
- Maki Ueda (artist) (上田 麻希; born 1974), Japanese artist
- Maki Ueda (wrestler) (マキ 上田; born 1982), Japanese retired professional wrestler
- Maki Wada (和田 麻希; born 1986), Japanese track and field sprinter
- Maki Yano (矢野 真紀; born 1977), Japanese J-pop singer

==== Men ====
- Maki Ishii (石井 眞木; 1936–2003), Japanese composer
- Maki Kaji (鍜治 真起; 1951–2021), Japanese businessman
- Maki Kitahara (北原 槙; born 2009), Japanese footballer
- Maki Sasaki (佐々木 マキ; born 1946), Japanese illustrator, picture book writer and manga artist

=== Surname ===
- Carmen Maki (カルメン・マキ; born 1951), born Maki Annette Lovelace, American-Japanese singer
- Claude Maki (真木 蔵人; born 1972), Japanese surfing and flight champion, actor and hip hop singer
- Fumihiko Maki (槇 文彦; 1928—2024), Japanese architect
- Fuyukichi Maki (牧 冬吉; 1930–1998), Japanese actor
- Haku Maki (巻白; 1924–2000), Japanese sōsaku-hanga
- Izumi Maki (athlete) (真木 和; 1968–2018), Japanese long-distance runner
- Jun Maki (眞木 準; 1948–2009), Japanese copywriter
- Karina Maki (巻 加理奈; born 1982), Japanese Team handball player
- Kazumi Maki (真木 和美; 1936-2008), Japanese theoretical physicist
- Masaki Maki (真木 将樹; born 1976), Japanese former professional baseball pitcher
- Miyako Maki (牧 美也子; born 1935), Japanese manga artist
- Seiichiro Maki (巻 誠一郎; born 1980), Japanese former professional footballer
- Shinichi Maki (牧 真一; 1917–1977), Japanese fencer
- Shinji Maki (牧 伸二; 1934-2013), Japanese mandan comedian
- Shugo Maki (牧 秀悟; born 1998), Japanese professional baseball infielder
- Taichiro Maki (牧 太一郎; born 1980), Japanese professional wrestler
- Yasuomi Maki (真木 保臣; 1813–1864), Japanese samurai of the late Edo period
- Yōko Maki (actress) (真木 よう子; born 1982), Japanese actress
- Yōko Maki (artist) (槙 ようこ; born 1981), Japanese former manga artist
- Yoshio Maki (牧 義夫; born 1958), Japanese politician
- Yuki Maki (巻 佑樹; born 1984), Japanese former footballer
- Yukiko Maki (1902–1989), Japanese educator
- Yūkō Maki (槇 有恒; 1894–1989), Japanese mountain climber

=== Non-Japanese people ===
==== Given name ====
- Maki (singer) (born 1999), Filipino singer
- Maki Esther Ortiz (born 1962), Mexican politician
- Maki Gingoyon (born 1990), Filipino transgender model, beauty queen, transgender activist, and businesswoman
- Maki Kureishi (1927–1995), Pakistani poet
- Maki Petratos (born 2000), Australian professional footballer
- Maki Pitolo (born 1990), American mixed martial artist
- Maki Pulido (born 1972), Filipino broadcaster

==== Surname ====
- Ally Maki (born 1986), American actress and former musician
- Chico Maki (1939–2015), Canadian ice hockey forward
- Pete Maki (born 1982), American professional baseball coach
- Roger A. Maki, American politician
- Tomi Maki (born 1983), Finnish ice hockey player
- Wayne Maki (1944–1973), Canadian professional ice hockey player

== Fictional characters ==
=== Given name ===
- Maki Aikawa (相川 摩季), the protagonist in the Air Master series
- Maki Genryusai (源柳斉 真紀; マキ), character in Final Fight and Street Fighter video game series
- Maki Karii (雁井 真希), an alias Minami Maki uses in Magical Trans!
- Maki Katsuragi (桂木 眞己), a male main character in Stars Align
- Maki Harukawa (春川 魔姫), a character from Danganronpa V3: Killing Harmony
- Maki Nikaido, one of the main characters of Death Note film series spin-off L: Change the World
- Maki Nishikino (西木野 真姫), character in the Love Live! School Idol Project series
- Maki Oze (茉希 尾瀬), a character in Fire Force
- Maki Shijo (四条 眞妃), character in the Kaguya-sama series
- Maki Zen'in (禪院真希), a character from Jujutsu Kaisen
- Maki Konuri (小塗 マキ), a character from the role-playing game Blue Archive

=== Surname ===
- Kiyoka Maki, the Ultimate Sniper, from Danganronpa Another Despair Academy
- Kiyoto Maki (真木 清人), character in the Kamen Rider OOO series
- Mahito Maki (牧 眞人), a character from The Boy and the Heron
- Minami Maki (真木 南), a character from Magical Trans!
- Natsuo Maki (真木 夏緒), a character from Love Lab
- Shinichi Maki (牧 紳一), a character from Slam Dunk
- Shoichi Maki (牧 勝一), a character from The Boy and the Heron
- Shoko Maki (間木 照子), the alias of Naomi Misora from Death Note
- Shunichi Maki, the main character in Ultraman (2004 film)
