= Maki =

Maki may refer to:

== People ==
- Mäki, a Finnish surname (includes a list of people with the name)
- Maki (name), a Japanese given name and surname (includes a list of people with the name)
- Maki (singer), a Filipino singer

== Places ==
- Maki, Ravar, Kerman Province, Iran
- Maki, Rigan, Kerman Province, Iran
- Maki, Razavi Khorasan, Iran
- Maki, Niigata (Nishikanbara), a former town in Niigata Prefecture, Japan
- Maki, Niigata (Higashikubiki), a former village in Niigata Prefecture, Japan
- Mąki, Poland

== Political parties ==
- Maki (political party), the Communist Party of Israel
- Maki (historical political party), the original Communist Party of Israel

== Food ==
- Maki roll or makizushi, a style of sushi wrapped in dried seaweed
- Norimaki, a class of Japanese foods wrapped in dried seaweed
- Maki mi (or maki soup), a Chinese-Filipino pork tenderloin soup

== Other uses ==
- Maki Engineering, a Grand Prix racing constructor
- Japanese ship Maki, the name of several ships
- Ring-tailed lemur, or maky/maki, a primate

== See also ==
- Makki (disambiguation)
