= Yōko Maki =

Yōko Maki may refer to:

- Yōko Maki (artist) (born 1981), Japanese manga artist
- Yōko Maki (actress) (born 1982), Japanese actress

== See also ==
- Maki (disambiguation)
