= List of Kamen Rider OOO episodes =

This is a list of episodes of the 2010–2011 Kamen Rider Series Kamen Rider OOO. Each episode title consists of three objects featured in the episode.

== Episodes ==
No.	Title	Directed by	Written by	Original release date
1	"Medals, Underwear, and a Mysterious Arm"; Transliteration: "Medaru to Pantsu to Nazo no Ude" (Japanese: メダルとパンツと謎の腕)	Ryuta Tasaki	Yasuko Kobayashi	September 5, 2010
While working as a part-time security guard for the Kougami Foundation's art museum, nomadic vagabond Eiji Hino is knocked out by two thieves. As they rob the artifact chamber, a mass of coins forms into a disembodied right arm and breaks the seal on a sarcophagus, releasing coin-like monsters called the Greeed. Upon being alerted to the robbery, the foundation sends private security to trap the Greeed, but the latter kill all except for Shintaro Goto while escaping. Sometime later, Eiji is awoken by a red coin. Believing it is his paycheck, he leaves with it, only to later be accosted by the arm. Meanwhile, one of the Greeed, Uva, uses a woman in a jewelry store to create the Kamakiri Yummy and instructs it to find Ankh, who stole several of the Greeed's "Core Medals". After mortally wounding police detective Shingo Izumi, the Yummy eventually finds Ankh. When Eiji intervenes, Ankh gives him to the means to become Kamen Rider OOO so he can destroy the Yummy. Following the fight, Eiji discovers Shingo's sister Hina is trying to call her brother. Ankh possesses Shingo's body while the foundation move to collect the Yummy's coin-like remains.
2	"Desire, Ice Pops, and Presents"; Transliteration: "Yokubō to Aisu to Purezento" (Japanese: 欲望とアイスとプレゼント)	Ryuta Tasaki	Yasuko Kobayashi	September 12, 2010
As Kougami Foundation robots collect the Kamakiri Yummy's remains for the organization's leader, Kousei Kougami, Ankh tells Eiji he is keeping Shingo alive and reveals that he requires "Cell Medals", like the ones the Yummy was made of, to rebuild his body and Core Medals, which give the Greeed life and power. Meanwhile, Uva finds the art thieves and uses one of them to create a new, blank Yummy that hungers for wealth. Sensing the monster's creation, Ankh leads Eiji to the bank, where the Yummy is frantically eating money, but denies Eiji his Rider equipment until it evolves into the Otoshibumi Yummy so he can gather more Cell Medals from it. Eiji tries to fight it on his own, but is overpowered until Ankh saves him, after which Eiji makes him promise not to put his needs over human lives. Regaining his Rider equipment, Eiji receives further help from Goto and more Kougami Foundation robots to destroy the Otoshibumi Yummy, allowing Ankh to feed on its Cell Medals. Afterward, Eiji tells Hina Shingo is on an undercover mission, but she unexpectedly appears and hugs Ankh, who nearly kills her before Eiji stops him.
3	"A Cat, Evolution, and a Glutton"; Transliteration: "Neko to Shinka to Kuishinbō" (Japanese: ネコと進化と食いしん坊)	Takayuki Shibasaki	Yasuko Kobayashi	September 19, 2010
As Ankh reviews Shingo's memories to determine who Hina is, she notices the former's arm and tears it off with her superhuman strength, but faints in shock. Ankh renews his attempt to kill her until Eiji threatens to throw his Rider equipment away. Ankh reluctantly changes his mind before Eiji takes him to the Cous Coussier restaurant, but the former leaves. Meanwhile, one of the Greeed's members, Kazari, notices how much humanity has changed since they were sealed and uses the gluttonous Monta Fukuji to create a parasitic Yummy to utilize his ravenous behavior. Ankh leads Eiji to Fukuji, but Eiji has difficulty forcing out the Yummy without harming Fukuji, who eventually escapes. After seeing an arriving Goto utilize Cell Medal-based technology, Ankh travels to Shingo's home and uses the latter's iPhone 4 to learn more about the 21st century. Elsewhere, Eiji discovers Fukuji is unwillingly attacking Cous Coussier, its owner Chiyoko Shiraishi, and Hina. Eiji lures Fukuji outside, where Fukuji transforms into the Neko Yummy. Despite initial difficulty and Ankh's belief that Fukuji will die from his gluttony anyway, Eiji almost destroys the monster, but Kazari intervenes to save his creation.
4	"Doubt, a Picture Message, and a Helping Hand"; Transliteration: "Utagai to Shame to Sukui no Te" (Japanese: 疑いと写メと救いの手)	Takayuki Shibasaki	Yasuko Kobayashi	September 26, 2010
As the Neko Yummy escapes, Kazari forces Eiji not to pursue and offers to make a deal with Ankh, who asks for time to consider it. As Eiji collapses from exhaustion, Hina brings him to Cous Coussier, where he reveals everything he has become involved in to her and promises to save Shingo while recovering. Using the internet, Ankh locates Fukuji. After learning from Chiyoko of Fukuji's presence at a nearby restaurant, a still injured Eiji leaves to stop him despite Hina's pleas. As he, Ankh, and Kazari converge, Eiji affirms he will not be Ankh's tool while Ankh tells Kazari he would rather work with humans because he can trust them over the Greeed. Eiji transforms to fight Kazari, during which the former loses one of Ankh's stolen Core Medals, but gains three of Kazari's, forcing the weakened Greeed to retreat. Using the new medals, Eiji frees Fukuji from the Neko Yummy before destroying it. In the aftermath, Fukuji is taken to the hospital while Eiji and Ankh are approached by Kougami's aide and representative, Erika Satonaka, who uses a tablet to facilitate a meeting between them and her boss.
5	"A Game of Tag, a Nest, and a Rich Girl"; Transliteration: "Oikakekko to Su to Serebu" (Japanese: 追いかけっこと巣とセレブ)	Osamu Kaneda	Yasuko Kobayashi	October 3, 2010
Kougami negotiates with Eiji and Ankh, the latter especially, to form a partnership wherein Kougami receives 70% of any Cell Medals acquired. Though Ankh refuses, Kougami gives him time to consider. Meanwhile, the Greeed assume human forms based on Kazari's findings while one of their number, Mezool, uses a shopaholic and classmate of Hina's named Haruka Yamano to create a hidden mass of roe that gradually multiply based on her excessive shopping. The next day, Ankh attempts to conduct research into the Kougami Foundation, only to be interrupted by a strange presence. He takes Eiji to the location and has him transform before Mezool appears. Though they are evenly matched, she eventually leaves before Ankh follows suit, despite faintly detecting her Yummy, to resume his work. Noticing a particular building nearby, Eiji finds Hina there and warns her of the Yummy's presence before Uva attacks them, having learned of them from Mezool. Lacking his Rider equipment, Eiji leads Uva away and alerts Ankh while Hina locates Yamano, who learns her father's company has gone bankrupt. Upon reaching him, Ankh helps Eiji fight Uva by revealing Kazari stole one of Uva's Core Medals and retrieves three unique medals from him.
6	"Fashion, a Contract, and the Strongest Combo"; Transliteration: "Oyōfuku to Keiyaku to Saikyō Konbo" (Japanese: お洋服と契約と最強コンボ)	Osamu Kaneda	Yasuko Kobayashi	October 10, 2010
A weakened Uva reluctantly withdraws, vowing revenge on Ankh and his fellow Greeed. Ankh reveals to Eiji that the Greeed, at their strongest, possess three sets of unique Core Medals and if Eiji were to use one set, he can emulate their full power. Ankh leaves Eiji with enough medals to use his regular Rider forms before leaving to locate Kougami. During their subsequent meeting, Kougami agrees to receive 60% of all medals acquired, which Ankh begrudgingly agrees to. Meanwhile, Uva confronts Kazari, who misleads him before Mezool reminds Uva her Yummy will provide Cell Medals for them soon enough. Concurrently, Yamano's despair over her father's company's bankruptcy causes the Yummy roe to stir. Eiji returns to Hina's building, where a waiting Goto gives him the roe's coordinates and reminds him he needs Kougami's help, before finding Hina in the midst of failing to stop Yamano from shopping, which causes a school of Piranha Yummy to emerge. Seeing this, Eiji transforms to get the girls to safety before Ankh arrives to give him Uva's medals, allowing Eiji to destroy the monsters. Later, a changed Yamano gains a job at a bakery.
7	"A Lousy Husband, a Trap, and a Jackpot"; Transliteration: "Dame Teishu to Wana to Ōatari" (Japanese: ダメ亭主と罠と大当たり)	Satoshi Morota	Yasuko Kobayashi	October 17, 2010
After establishing a hideout, Kazari tells Mezool that he intends to use their fellow Greeed, Gamel, to regain their stolen Core Medals while Uva enacts a separate plan to destroy Ankh and an amused Gamel becomes inspired by a bickering married couple to create the Bison Yummy to satiate his desire to see people being hit with objects. Concurrently, Eiji takes up part-time work at Cous Coussier despite Chiyoko offering him full-time and housing before a woman named Momoko Komori arrives, looking for her husband Takeshi, then storms off. Noticing that she was not wearing shoes, Chiyoko sends Eiji to give her new ones. He finds Momoko as she is berating Takeshi for spending their money on scratchcards and tries to stop them until Takeshi finds a winning scratchcard and the Bison Yummy and Gamel attack the trio. Eiji is overpowered until Goto arrives with a new Core Medal for Eiji to use, though the monsters escape while the Komoris resume their argument. Elsewhere, Ankh reviews the Core Medals he and the other Greeed own before he is unknowingly lured into a trap by Uva, who separates him from Shingo and steals two Core Medals from him.
8	"Sabotage, Having No Greed, and Taking a Break"; Transliteration: "Sabori to Muyoku to Kyūkeichū" (Japanese: サボりと無欲と休憩中)	Satoshi Morota	Yasuko Kobayashi	October 24, 2010
Amidst Hino's failed attempts at stopping the Komoris' argument, Momoko takes the winning scratchcard and throws it into a nearby river. As Takeshi frantically searches for it, she reveals to Hino why Takeshi has become so greedy. In time, Hino helps the Komoris reconcile, with Takeshi resuming his photography career. Meanwhile, a weakened Ankh escapes, but finds he is unable to heal. Refusing to call Hino out of pride, he waits for Shingo's body to become available. Concurrently, Mezool stops Uva and Kazari from fighting and convinces the former to return the medals he took from Ankh while Gamel complains about losing to Hino, causing the Bison Yummy to act on its creator's new desire and seek revenge. The next day, as the monster attacks a construction site, Hino finds Ankh and gives him Cell Medals he acquired from Kougami to heal him before destroying the Bison Yummy, though it only leaves one Cell Medal behind. Afterward, Hina discovers Ankh is the reason why Hino did not accept Chiyoko's offer and uses him to make Hino reconsider so she can watch over Shingo.
9	"Drenched, the Past, and the Scorching Combo"; Transliteration: "Zubunure to Kako to Shakunetsu Konbo" (Japanese: ずぶぬれと過去と灼熱コンボ)	Takayuki Shibasaki	Yasuko Kobayashi	October 31, 2010
In flashbacks, Eiji fails to save a girl amidst a foreign civil war. In the present, Satonaka meets with Eiji to collect Kougami's fee until an explosion occurs outside. While investigating, Eiji discovers a strange man with a puppet on his shoulder and a Same Yummy, which caused the explosion, though both escape. To his dismay, Eiji discovers it is connected to more Same Yummy that were created by Mezool from someone who desires destruction. Meanwhile, as they feast on the Same Yummy, Kazari deduces a third party is involved in the struggle for the Greeed's Core Medals. The next day, Eiji reveals to Hina that the Same Yummy attack affects him deeply due to his past before leaving to fight another Same Yummy. After being intercepted by Mezool and Gamel, a cornered Eiji uses Kazari's medals to overpower them and destroy the Same Yummy, allowing Ankh to steal four of Mezool's Core Medals before Gamel helps her escape. As Ankh takes all of Eiji's Core Medals for being reckless, Eiji spots the stranger, Kougami Foundation scientist Kiyoto Maki, who reveals he knows who the bomber is and has been watching Eiji before leaving to meet with Kougami.
10	"A Fist, an Experiment, and a Super Bike"; Transliteration: "Kobushi to Jikken to Chō Baiku" (Japanese: 拳と実験と超バイク)	Takayuki Shibasaki	Yasuko Kobayashi	November 14, 2010
As Maki observes the bomber, Kougami Biotech Laboratory technician Toru Tadano, Ankh scolds Eiji, who later discovers Maki's whereabouts. The pair travel to the laboratory, where Ankh identifies Tadano as the Same Yummies' host while Eiji destroys another instance of the Yummy. Spotting Eiji, Maki puts the laboratory on lockdown to prevent him from interfering with the nest. While Eiji leaves to stop Tadano, Goto locates the nest and fights off the emerging Same Yummies. Upon defusing the bombs and seeing Tadano arrested, Eiji returns to the laboratory and uses newly developed Kougami Foundation equipment to destroy the Same Yummies. Afterward, Maki ponders whether Eiji will provide the world a satisfying conclusion.
11	"A Traveler, a Swallowtail, and a Celebrity"; Transliteration: "Tabibito to Agehachō to Yūmeijin" (Japanese: 旅人とアゲハ蝶と有名人)	Osamu Kaneda	Shōji Yonemura	November 21, 2010
Eiji encounters an old friend and globetrotting blogger, Keisuke Tsukuba, who has come to Japan to find a publisher for his work. Eiji offers to help, but Tsukuba is rejected in favor of a better writer named Kotaro Sawada. Taking advantage of this, Uva finds Tsukuba and uses him to create the Ageha Yummy, which siphons Sawada's talent and transfers it to Tsukuba. Upon learning of the attack, Eiji fights the Yummy, but it escapes. Having seen this, an upset Goto reports Eiji's failure to Kougami, who gives Eiji a new robot to use. On his way out, Goto meets Maki, who suggests the former is better suited to protect the world from the Greeed. Meanwhile, the Ageha Yummy attacks the Meguro Masaji comedy duo for their talent, though Goto arrives to save them. Eiji and Ankh pursue the monster, but are intercepted by Gamel, who seeks Mezool's Core Medals. Though Eiji fights back, he leaves to stop the Yummy, losing two of Mezool's medals in the process. Despite wounding the Ageha Yummy, Goto fires a bazooka at it and Eiji. Meanwhile, Hina realizes something is off with Tsukuba, but Uva attacks her.
12	"An Eel, the World, and the Gravity Combo"; Transliteration: "Unagi to Sekai to Jūryoku Konbo" (Japanese: ウナギと世界と重力コンボ)	Osamu Kaneda	Shōji Yonemura	November 28, 2010
Following Goto's attack, the Ageha Yummy retreats again while Eiji learns of Goto's distaste towards him. Just then, having successfully evaded Uva, Hina arrives to tell Eiji of what happened to Tsukuba, who has become a minor celebrity. As Ankh considers stealing Gamel's Core Medals, Eiji and Hina confirm Tsukuba is the Ageha Yummy's host after Tsukuba reveals he seeks to prove himself and asks to use Eiji's story as his own. After learning Gamel recovered two of Mezool's Core Medals, Uva offers to work with him to kill Eiji while Goto is suspended by Kougami, but receives work with Maki. Sometime later, Eiji agrees to Tsukuba's deal, on the condition that he not obscure the truth. A moved Tsukuba reveals he never traveled the world. As Uva, Gamel, and the Ageha Yummy attack, Eiji struggles against them until Ankh tells him to retrieve a set of Gamel's Core Medals. Using their power, Eiji successfully destroys the Yummy and repels the Greeed. In the aftermath, Ankh steals one of Uva's Core Medals, Eiji gains Goto's friendship, and Tsukuba leaves to achieve short-term goals.
13	"A Siamese Cat, Stress, and the Genius Surgeon"; Transliteration: "Shamu-Neko to Sutoresu to Tensai Gekai" (Japanese: シャム猫とストレスと天才外科医)	Hidenori Ishida	Yasuko Kobayashi	December 5, 2010
Satonaka meets with Goto to inform him that he will be replacing her as Kougami's aide while she takes a vacation. Concurrently, Ankh struggles with not being able to find his personal Core Medals while Kazari uses Kei Tamura, a surgeon who feels that her talents are being wasted, to create a new Yummy, causing her to perform unauthorized operations on her own. Sensing the Yummy's creation, Ankh uses Shingo's memories and Eiji and Hina's assistance to infiltrate the hospital Tamura works at by posing as an injured patient, only to find Goto also there, having using the same strategy. The Yummy emerges to force Tamura to attack her father, the hospital director, but Eiji lures it outside, where it evolves into the Siamneko Yummy. Eiji nearly destroys it, only to be reminded that Tamura is still part of it. As the Yummy escapes, an incensed Ankh storms off, leaving Shingo's body in critical condition.
14	"Pride, Surgery, and a Secret"; Transliteration: "Puraido to Shujutsu to Himitsu" (Japanese: プライドと手術と秘密)	Hidenori Ishida	Yasuko Kobayashi	December 12, 2010
As the hospital staff take Shingo into their care, the director suffers a heart attack upon learning what happened to Tamura and reveals to Eiji that he held her back because of her pride and lack of fear for her patients. Resolving to save Tamura, Eiji leaves to find her and the Siamneko Yummy, successfully doing so before it can kill Ankh. Eiji frees Tamura and convinces her to reconcile with her father while Ankh returns to Shingo's body and Tamura operates on her father. Though Kazari intervenes in Eiji's fight with the Siamneko Yummy and takes two of his personal Core Medals back, Eiji nonetheless destroys the Siamneko Yummy, forcing the Greeed to retreat. While being reprimanded by Ankh for losing two Core Medals, Eiji is pleased to discover Tamura was successful in saving her father. Elsewhere, Mezool secretly used a conman to create more Piranha Yummy and sustain the Greeed while Uva independently cultivates his own Yummy nest. Concurrently, Maki concludes his analysis on one of Ankh's Core Medals.
15	"The Medal Struggle, the Transport Truck, and the Container"; Transliteration: "Medaru Sōdatsu to Yusōsha to Utsuwa" (Japanese: メダル争奪と輸送車と器)	Satoshi Morota	Yasuko Kobayashi	December 19, 2010
Ankh reveals to Eiji that he has been spying on Kougami and learned Goto is going to oversee a truck containing 5000 Cell Medals and one of Ankh's Core Medals. Eiji refuses to help until Kazari arrives, revealing further that Hina was placed in the truck. Upon confirming her disappearance, Eiji convinces Goto to let him follow the truck. However, they are attacked by the other Greeed, who intend to steal the Cell Medals. Ankh arrives to help fight them and get his Core Medal back, but Eiji loses most of his to Kazari and is knocked out by Mezool. As Uva and Gamel steal the truck, Mezool confronts Kazari regarding his plans for the truck, but he steals her Core Medals and meets with the other Greeed, claiming Eiji defeated her. As Gamel leaves to save her, Kazari reveals the truth and attempts to steal Uva's Core Medals, but Uva escapes. Concurrently, Ankh awakens Eiji, but gets into an argument with him until they make a deal, find the truck, and save Hina. Eiji subsequently fights Kazari and Gamel, but loses the latter's medals to him before the pair escape, after which Kazari tricks Gamel into absorbing Mezool's medals.
16	"An End, the Greeed, and a New Rider"; Transliteration: "Shūmatsu to Gurīdo to Shin Raidā" (Japanese: 終末とグリードと新ライダー)	Satoshi Morota	Yasuko Kobayashi	December 26, 2010
Centuries prior, alchemists created the Greeed, who were born with an insatiable desire to become whole. In the present, having formed an alliance with Maki, who wants to see what happens when a Greeed absorbs every Core Medal, Kazari tricks Gamel into absorbing Mezool's, restoring his full power. Maki asks for Kazari's medals, but he refuses, taking Ankh's medal as payment. Concurrently, Ankh and Goto separately confront Kougami and Maki, with the former revealing the latter's role in what happened while Maki reveals he has completed his own medal system. Elsewhere, Gamel eventually finds Mezool, who recognizes that he has her medals. She convinces him to let her absorb him, but Maki overloads her with Uva's medals and the 5000 Cell Medals, causing her to transform into a mindless Mega Greeed. Eiji struggles to stop it until a mysterious figure removes Uva's medals, allowing Eiji to use them to destroy the monster, killing Mezool and Gamel. As Uva and Kazari steal most of the constituent medals, leaving Ankh with one from Mezool and Gamel each, Eiji realizes he needs to save the Greeed from themselves and meets the stranger, who identifies himself as "Kamen Rider Birth".
17	"The Kendo Girl, Oden, and the Splitting Yummy"; Transliteration: "Kendō Shōjo to Oden to Bunri Yamī" (Japanese: 剣道少女とおでんと分離ヤミー)	Takayuki Shibasaki	Yasuko Kobayashi	January 9, 2011
Birth introduces himself as Akira Date and, using the Birth system instruction manual, identifies Eiji and Ankh before leaving. Ankh grows irate over not being able to research Date, but Eiji assures him that they will learn more about him soon enough. Meanwhile, a girl named Rie Shiratori's desire to perform better for her kendo class attracts Uva, who uses her to create the Kabuto Yummy, which attacks everyone who is better than her at kendo. Upon learning of it, Eiji tries to fight the monster, but it knocks out Rie and flees. After taking her to the hospital, Eiji resumes his fight with the Yummy. However, Rie's changing desire suddenly causes it to spawn the Kuwagata Yummy, which joins the Kabuto Yummy in overwhelming Eiji until Date and Goto arrive to help. Together, Eiji and Date destroy the Kabuto Yummy, but the Kuwagata Yummy escapes. Ankh tries to collect the Cell Medals, but Date takes them first, explaining his job is to gather one hundred million of them.
18	"Destruction, Motives, and the Eel Whip"; Transliteration: "Hakai to Riyū to Unagi Muchi" (Japanese: 破壊と理由とウナギムチ)	Takayuki Shibasaki	Yasuko Kobayashi	January 16, 2011
Upon being released from the hospital, Rie returns to her kendo class to see her teacher, Masaru, but is stopped by Uva, who tells her to wait for her desire to come true. Meanwhile, as they discuss the Kuwagata Yummy's creation, Ankh and Eiji realize the Kabuto Yummy actually represented her desire to reach the goal that the Kuwagata Yummy represents. Concurrently, Goto formally introduces himself to Date to learn more about the Birth system, recalling how Kougami did not let him use it because of his pride. The next day, Eiji and Ankh return to Rie's class to determine why she wants to become stronger. She refuses to answer, but Date arrives, revealing she has a crush on Masaru and wants to eliminate her competition, especially his fiancée. Date advises Rie to handle the matter properly and personally before Uva attacks the group. Eiji and Ankh hold him off while Rie and Date head to Masaru's wedding to stop the Kuwagata Yummy. Though Date destroys it, Ankh forces him to leave its Cell Medals. Eiji asks to work with Date, but he refuses despite being impressed with Eiji.
19	"The Red Medal, the Detective, and Betrayal"; Transliteration: "Akai Medaru to Keiji to Uragiri" (Japanese: 赤いメダルと刑事と裏切り)	Hidenori Ishida	Yasuko Kobayashi	January 23, 2011
Three years prior, a criminal named Toichi Yamagane was betrayed by his partner Yasuji "Yasu" Okumura and arrested by Shingo, for which he vowed revenge on them both. In the present, Eiji discovers Goto is now working at Cous Coussier. Later, while attending a meeting with Kougami, Eiji receives one of Ankh's Core Medals and is told that he needs to become stronger as the remaining Greeed are too. Afraid that Ankh will take his medal and leave Shingo, Eiji refuses it. Upon returning to Cous Coussier, he encounters Okumura, who wants to find Shingo. Elsewhere, Kazari receives a cellphone from Maki to maintain their dealings due to Date taking up residence in his lab while using a fugitive Yamagane to create a Yummy fueled by his desire for revenge. Yamagane eventually locates Yasu and transforms into the chimeric Lion-Kurage Yummy. Despite Eiji's intervention, the monster overpowers him. Kazari arrives, revealing he absorbed his share of Mezool's medals beforehand before Yasu helps him steal two of his personal medals back from Ankh and Hina.
20	"A Decoy, the Qualifications, and the Blazing Combo"; Transliteration: "Otori to Shikaku to Honō no Konbo" (Japanese: 囮(おとり)と資格と炎のコンボ)	Hidenori Ishida	Yasuko Kobayashi	January 30, 2011
Kazari takes the last medal he needs from Eiji, but Ankh anticipated his plan, worked with Yasu to facilitate it, and offers to trade one of his own medals for Kazari's last medal before claiming that Eiji has it and throwing him off the roof of a building. As Kazari and the Lion-Kurage Yummy pursue him, Hina takes Ankh's medal to force him to help Eiji. He threatens to kill her, but ultimately cannot follow through. Concurrently, Date trains Goto in using the Birth system while Yasu saves Eiji and treats his injuries. The next day, the Lion-Kurage Yummy begins to absorb Yamagane. Sensing this, Ankh rushes to find Eiji. The pair reunite, but Eiji does not have enough medals to transform. Nonetheless, Date arrives to save Yamagane from the Yummy while Satonaka arrives with Ankh's third medal. Using Ankh's medals, Eiji assumes a new form and destroys the Yummy, allowing Date to take its Cell Medals. Due to his injuries, Eiji fails to stop Ankh from reabsorbing his medals and restoring some of his strength. Nonetheless, he is still unable to reform the rest of his body.
21	"The Grasshopper, the Father and Son, and the Ally of Justice"; Transliteration: "Batta to Oyako to Seigi no Mikata" (Japanese: バッタと親子と正義の味方)	Ryuta Tasaki	Nobuhiro Mouri	February 6, 2011
While helping the Cous Coussier staff prepare for Valentine's Day, Goto witnesses an older man harassing a young boy, Takeshi, over the latter telling him to stop littering. Soon after, Takeshi's father, Susumu Kanbayashi, arrives to congratulate his son. However, Takeshi runs off after Susumu refuses to come home to him and his mother. Uva subsequently attacks Susumu, using his desire for justice to create the Batta Yummy. Meanwhile, Eiji takes Ankh on an errand to help him take his mind off not being able to reform his body until Ankh senses the Yummy. Strangely enough, they see it return a woman's stolen purse. Goto later finds Takeshi and attempts to stop him from endangering himself, but the boy refuses to listen. Upon seeing the Batta Yummy attack a group of punks and nearly kill Takeshi, Eiji intervenes. Due to him lacking suitable medals to counter the Yummy's speed, Ankh reluctantly gives Eiji one of his. He nearly destroys the monster, but Susumu protects it. Seeing that his father is unwilling to give up his newfound power, Takeshi joins him, to Eiji's astonishment.
22	"Chocolate, Faith, and the Power of Justice"; Transliteration: "Choko to Shinnen to Seigi no Chikara" (Japanese: チョコと信念と正義の力)	Ryuta Tasaki	Nobuhiro Mouri	February 13, 2011
Susumu tells Eiji to stop interfering before he, Takeshi, and the Batta Yummy flee to attack previously untouchable criminals, with Uva watching over them. Later, while continuing his training with the Birth system, Goto recalls Takeshi's words and realizes justice can have a corrupting influence if taken to an obsessive degree. He later asks why Date fights, but the latter instead advises him to believe in himself before leaving to fight the Batta Yummy. He joins Eiji in confronting the monster and the Kanbayashis. Eiji questions whether their actions are justified, but Uva attacks him, regaining two of his personal medals from him before ordering the Batta Yummy to press the attack. Eiji tells Susumu he should protect those dear to him while Goto tells Takeshi of Date's advice. Uva attempts to create a Yummy from Takeshi, but the boy negates his desire before Eiji, Date, and Goto repel Uva, allowing Ankh to steal one of his personal medals and one of Mezool's. As the Kanbayashis reconcile and flee to safety, Eiji destroys the Batta Yummy while Date and Ankh fight over the Cell Medals.
23	"Beauty, the Egg, and the Sleeping Desire"; Transliteration: "Kirei to Tamago to Nemuru Yokubō" (Japanese: キレイと卵と眠る欲望)	Satoshi Morota	Yasuko Kobayashi	February 20, 2011
After absorbing his share of Gamel's medals, Kazari secretly uses a Beauty Marine Lab beauty salon employee named Yumi Sakura to create a Yummy egg and meets with Uva to taunt him over not absorbing his share of Mezool and Gamel's medals. A fight ensues, though Uva escapes. Meanwhile, as Ankh grows worried about the state of the Core Medals and Eiji not having enough power, Maki advises Date to undergo a check-up for potential side effects of using the Birth system. Date meets with Eiji to discuss a photo of the latter, but they are alerted to the Greeed's fight. Despite getting distracted by an encounter with Yumi, an old friend of his, Date nonetheless joins Eiji in fighting Kazari until the monster retreats. Concurrently, the Yummy egg manipulates Yumi into indulging in her desire to become prettier than her younger sister and Marine Beauty Lab's president, Rei, before spawning a squadron of Ei Yummy to attack Eiji and Ankh when they intervene. Via the egg's power, Yumi quickly becomes beauty incarnate and causes every man around her except for Date and Ankh to fall madly in love with her.
24	"Memories, Love, and the Ocean Combo"; Transliteration: "Omoide to Koi to Umi no Konbo" (Japanese: 思い出と恋と海のコンボ)	Satoshi Morota	Yasuko Kobayashi	February 27, 2011
With Eiji lovesick over Yumi's otherworldly beauty, the unaffected Date and Ankh try to find the Yummy egg, only to be thwarted by the Ei Yummy. The next day, Goto helps Hina and Ankh bring Eiji back to his senses and take one of Mezool's medals from Kazari while Date meets with Kougami to discuss his health, current Cell Medal total, and an upgrade to the Birth system that Maki is developing. As the Ei-Sai Yummy emerges from the egg, it joins Yumi in capturing Rei so she can take her place as Marine Beauty Lab's president. Seeing this on live television, Date brings Goto with him to save Yumi. Upon arrival, Date reveals he is immune to her beauty because he prefers the old version of her before reminding her of a past adventure they had. With Yumi free of its spell, the Ei-Sai Yummy attacks Date, but Goto helps him remove half of its Cell Medals. Though the Yummy transforms into the giant Itomakiei Yummy and injures Yumi, Eiji joins the fray and uses Mezool's medals to destroy it. Afterward, Yumi thanks Date for saving her before she is taken to the hospital.
25	"The Boxer, the Left Hand, and the Bird Yummy"; Transliteration: "Bokusā to Hidarite to Tori Yamī" (Japanese: ボクサーと左手と鳥ヤミー)	Takayuki Shibasaki	Yasuko Kobayashi	March 6, 2011
Eiji attempts to ask Ankh about his nature as a Greeed, but the latter storms off. Meanwhile, the Cous Coussier staff play host to a party led by Kazuki Okamura, a punch-drunk boxer who is being forced to retire. Date, Goto, and Eiji later learn of an Oumu Yummy healing Okamura's arm by petrifying that of his friend's. With Ankh watching from afar, Eiji and Date transform to fight the monster until it flies off with Okamura. After sending a Kougami Foundation robot to track it, Goto interrogates Ankh, suspecting him due to his and the Yummy's shared avian elements, but Eiji defends him, believing another Greeed created it. The next day, the Oumu Yummy attacks more men to heal Okamura's injuries further. Though Date, Goto, and Eiji fight it once more, they glimpse what appears to be Ankh helping the Yummy, leaving Eiji feeling betrayed. As the Oumu Yummy escapes again, Ankh pursues it.
26	"Ankh, the Ring, and Putting it All On"; Transliteration: "Anku to Ringu to Zenbu Nose" (Japanese: アンクとリングと全部のせ)	Takayuki Shibasaki	Yasuko Kobayashi	March 20, 2011 (Note: This episode was originally scheduled to air on March 13, 2011, but TV Asahi postponed the airing of this and several other television programs to air news coverage on the Tōhoku earthquake and tsunami.)
As Date tends to his injuries, Eiji remains convinced that a Greeed with Ankh's medals created the Oumu Yummy despite what happened and realizes that the Yummy steals attributes from others and gives it to their host. Date and Goto leave Eiji to recover while they look for the Yummy, but Eiji joins them anyway. The trio eventually find a fully healed Okamura and the Oumu Yummy attacking Ankh in an attempt to steal his medals. Joining the fray, they destroy the Yummy and undo its effects on Okamura, who promises to seek proper medical attention so he can continue fighting. As Ankh privately reveals to Eiji his intent to possess a body stronger than his original one, they are unknowingly watched by a left arm resembling Ankh's.
27	"1000, a Movie, and the Combatman"; Transliteration: "Sen to Eiga to Sentōin" (Japanese: 1000と映画と戦闘員)	Hidenori Ishida	Shōji Yonemura	March 27, 2011
Kougami summons Eiji and Ankh to help him celebrate the 1000th episode of the Kamen Rider franchise by making an anniversary film, Kamen Rider OOO vs Shocker, with Date serving as director. In particular, he promises to tell Ankh who has the rest of his medals. As Date fills out the cast, Ankh realizes Kougami Foundation employee In Sendo, who has been cast as a Shocker foot soldier, is a Yummy host. Before he can act on this, he detects another Oumu Yummy and has Eiji and Date join him in stopping it. Meanwhile, the Ika-Jaguar Yummy emerges from an egg in Sendo's apartment and acts on his desire to eliminate all Kamen Riders by joining Eiji and Date's battle with the Oumu Yummy. As it fights Date, Eiji destroys the Oumu Yummy.
28	"1000, the Kamen Riders, and the Birthday"; Transliteration: "Sen to Kamen Raidā to Tanjōbi" (Japanese: 1000と仮面ライダーと誕生日)	Hidenori Ishida	Shōji Yonemura	April 3, 2011
Despite destroying the Oumu Yummy, Eiji and Date are overpowered by the Ika-Jaguar Yummy before it escapes. Meanwhile, Ankh confronts Kougami for information on who has his Core Medals, only to later learn Kougami lied. Despite his injuries, an undeterred Date continues production on the film. However, Sendo leads an army of monsters in attacking the production team, revealing himself as an actual, formerly retired Shocker foot soldier. Though Eiji destroys the monsters, Kazari and the Ika-Jaguar Yummy arrive to help Sendo. Date tries to intervene, but his injuries prevent him. Nonetheless, he uses a new weapon Maki developed to help Eiji destroy the Yummy. Afterward, Eiji and Sendo call a truce and watch the completed film together.
29	"The Older Sister, the Doctor, and the Truth About Ankh"; Transliteration: "Ane to Dokutā to Anku no Shinjitsu" (Japanese: 姉と博士(ドクター)とアンクの真実)	Ryuta Tasaki	Yasuko Kobayashi	April 10, 2011
While following Ankh amidst his search for his remaining medals, Eiji theorizes as to why Ankh is unable to reform his body. Meanwhile, Kougami discovers Maki's partnership with Kazari and threatens brutal consequences unless Maki ends it. While visiting his sister, Hitomi's grave, Maki calls Kazari to tell him to absorb all of the Core Medals and turn into a Mega Greeed to achieve his desire of ending the world. However, Kazari refuses and creates the Shachi-Panda Yummy from Maki to act on his true desire, to see Hitomi again, before leaving to figure out what is wrong with Ankh, forcing Maki to stop the Yummy himself. As the monster bear-hugs people to death, Date discovers its presence and tries to stop it, but it flees. Maki attempts to pursue the Shachi-Panda Yummy until he encounters Chiyoko, who strongly resembles Hitomi and triggers memories of the latter seemingly caring for him before she died in a fire. Ankh senses his medals, but is intercepted by Kazari, who attacks Eiji for his last medal before a Greeed resembling Ankh interrupts in an attempt to absorb the original Ankh.
30	"The King, the Panda, and the Blazing Memory"; Transliteration: "Ō to Panda to Honō no Kioku" (Japanese: 王とパンダと炎の記憶)	Ryuta Tasaki	Yasuko Kobayashi	April 17, 2011
Eiji saves Ankh from the foreign Greeed and takes him to Cous Coussier, where they meet with Date to update him on what happened to them. After Date gives Ankh Cell Medals in exchange for the Greeed's origins, Ankh begrudgingly reveals that centuries prior, he helped an ancient king become the original Kamen Rider OOO in his attempts to become a god. Though the king betrayed him to use all of the Greeed's Core Medals to achieve his goal, their power overloaded him and transformed him into the sarcophagus that sealed the Greeed and Ankh's arm. Meanwhile, Goto conducts his own investigation into the Greeed's past and learns Kougami recovered Ankh's mummified body and revived it. Concurrently, as Chiyoko takes Maki to his childhood home, he slowly remembers that Hitomi abused him and intended to leave him after she got married, leading to him causing the fire that killed her and repressing the memory. As Eiji and Date destroy the Shachi-Panda Yummy, Maki forces Chiyoko to leave before quitting the Kougami Foundation and destroying his lab to work with Kazari to achieve his desire. The pair are soon joined by the foreign Greeed, Ankh (Lost).
31	"Returning the Favor, the Plan, and the Purple Medals"; Transliteration: "Ongaeshi to Takurami to Murasaki no Medaru" (Japanese: 恩返しとたくらみと紫のメダル)	Satoshi Morota	Yasuko Kobayashi	April 24, 2011
Maki presents Kazari and Ankh (Lost) with ten purple Core Medals that he stole from Kougami and his intention to create a new Greeed from them. Meanwhile, Hina's friend Suzuka asks Eiji for help in identifying a mysterious benefactor who has been leaving money for her and her mother. He eventually locates the person, Kosuke Sakata, who wants to pay back Suzuka's father for helping him. Suzuka and Ankh get involved, with her demanding Sakata to stop and him detecting a Cell Medal on him. After seeing two of his employees harass Suzuka for money, Sakata returns to his office to relieve the debt himself, but provokes several Kuzu Yummy within his staff. Eiji and Ankh arrive to destroy the monsters while Uva creates the Kuroageha Yummy from Sakata. Eiji and Ankh soon find Sakata, who reveals Uva paid him to use the Kuzu Yummy to create Cell Medals and increase his power. With an arriving Date's help, Eiji destroys the Yummy and helps Ankh take two of Gamel's medals from Uva. However, five of the purple medals appear and embed themselves within Eiji, allowing Uva to steal one of Ankh's medals from him before fleeing.
32	"A New Greeed, Desire, and the Invincible Combo"; Transliteration: "Shin Gurīdo to Kūhaku to Muteki no Konbo" (Japanese: 新グリードと空白と無敵のコンボ)	Satoshi Morota	Yasuko Kobayashi	May 1, 2011
Eiji's allies take him to the hospital, where the staff find no sign of trauma. Eiji is soon released, but finds that he now possesses Ankh's ability to sense Yummy. Heading to the source, he finds two Pteranodon Yummies attacking people. An arriving Date joins him in fighting the monsters, but one of the Yummies negates Eiji's transformation. He continues fighting to protect the civilians until Date evacuates him. While tending to his wounds, Date recognizes Eiji as the son of politicians who unknowingly caused a civil war in a foreign country. Kougami arrives, revealing Eiji's lack of desire makes him the perfect person to become OOO, though it also makes him susceptible to the purple medals, which will eventually drive him mad. The next day, the Pteranodon Yummies resume their attack. As Eiji, Ankh, Date, and Goto fight them, Eiji is suddenly possessed by the purple medals' power and goes on a rampage, destroying the Yummy and nearly killing Date until Hina arrives and brings him back to his senses. Meanwhile, Maki absorbs the remaining purple medals, turning himself into a Greeed, and uses the candle he killed Hitomi with to create a third Pteranodon Yummy.
33	"Friendship, Chaos, and the Belt Left Behind"; Transliteration: "Yūjō to Bōsō to Nokosareta Beruto" (Japanese: 友情と暴走と残されたベルト)	Hidenori Ishida	Nobuhiro Mouri	May 8, 2011
Maki tasks the new Pteranodon Yummy with testing Eiji's worthiness to use the purple medals' power. Losing control again, Eiji easily destroys the monster. As Ankh berates him for not being able to control the purple medals, Chiyoko arrives with a letter and amusement park tickets from Eiji's high school friend, Yuichi Kitamura. Eiji and his friends meet up with Kitamura at the amusement park and reconnect until Hina disappears and the Fukurou Yummy abducts Date. Despite learning of this, Eiji wants to find Hina first, though Ankh claims he will find Date himself. Instead, he confronts Kitamura, the Fukurou Yummy's host, but is caught in a trap. Kitamura leads Eiji and Goto to Hina and save her before the Fukurou Yummy ambushes them. Unwilling to use the purple medals, Eiji struggles against it while Goto grapples with his perceived unworthiness to succeed Date as Birth, leading to the monster kidnapping him as well. As Kitamura helps Eiji and Hina find their missing friends, Ankh is unknowingly targeted by Kazari and Ankh (Lost).
34	"The Close Friend, the Use, and This Connection"; Transliteration: "Shin'yū to Riyō to Sono Kankei" (Japanese: 親友と利用とその関係)	Hidenori Ishida	Nobuhiro Mouri	May 15, 2011
As Eiji continues searching for Date and Goto, Ankh escapes from Kitamura's trap and confronts him, forcing the latter to admit that he wants to spend more time with Eiji, but did not account for the Yummy kidnapping Eiji's friends. Ankh reveals this to Eiji, who keeps it hidden from Hina and defends Kitamura, saying Eiji himself is just as much at fault for what happened too before deducing the Fukurou Yummy brought Date and Goto to one of Kitamura's favorite places, a greenhouse. Eiji saves the pair before the Yummy and Kazari attack. As the trio fight back, the Fukurou Yummy abducts Ankh while Kazari steals one of Mezool's medals from Eiji and retreats. The Yummy brings Ankh to Maki and Ankh (Lost), but Eiji pursues the monsters and rescues Ankh. Taking partial control over the purple medals, he steals one of Kazari's personal medals, forces the three Greeed to escape, and destroys the Fukurou Yummy before Ankh restores his faculties.
35	"The Dream, the Brother, and Birth's Secret"; Transliteration: "Yume to Ani to Bāsu no Himitsu" (Japanese: 夢と兄とバースの秘密)	Ryuta Tasaki	Nobuhiro Mouri	May 22, 2011
Hina wins a fashion design contest at her school and receives the chance to move to Paris to fulfill her dream of becoming a fashion designer, but is forced to decline due to Shingo's condition. Unbeknownst to her, Maki uses the trophy of her classmate and contest runner-up, Shoko Sugiura, to create the Unicorn Yummy to destroy people's dreams. Date, Goto, and Eiji mobilize to stop the monster. However, Uva joins the fray, having lost Ankh's stolen medal to Kazari and Ankh (Lost), and steals Gamel's medals from Eiji before Date suddenly collapses. As the monsters leave, Kazari witnesses what happened from afar and deduces Uva is attempting to revive Gamel and Mezool. Following the fight, Eiji tries to push Hina to pursue her dream when Sugiura arrives to let her take Hina's place on the trip. Suddenly, the Unicorn Yummy attacks and, despite Eiji and an arriving Date's best efforts, destroys Hina's dream. Amidst the chaos, the Greeed get involved, during which Ankh uncharacteristically leaves Shingo's body to attack the Yummy, Uva steals Kazari's share of Gamel and Mezool's medals from him, and Shingo awakens on his own.
36	"Broken Dreams, the Body, and the Greeed Resurrection"; Transliteration: "Kowareta Yume to Karada to Gurīdo Fukkatsu" (Japanese: 壊れた夢と身体とグリード復活)	Ryuta Tasaki	Nobuhiro Mouri	May 29, 2011
While Uva leaves, Eiji and Ankh take a living Shingo and Date to the hospital, during which they learn Ankh had gradually healed Shingo over time. Eiji asks Ankh what will happen to Shingo without him, but Ankh ignores him and leaves. Meanwhile, Uva successfully revives Mezool and Gamel using their medals and the Cell Medals he acquired from Sakata before recruiting them to help him challenge Kazari. The next day, Goto learns Date is suffering from a cranial injury while Sugiura learns what happened to Hina. Realizing he needs to destroy the Yummy to save Hina, Eiji discovers Ankh has re-possessed Shingo due to an encounter with Uva's group. The Unicorn Yummy attacks Eiji, but his dream proves too large for it to destroy. Eiji gains full control of the purple medals and uses their power to destroy the Yummy. Afterward, a restored Hina allows Ankh to continue using Shingo's body a while longer while Mezool and Gamel betray Uva to join Kazari and Ankh (Lost) in destroying him for most of his personal medals. As the group leave to meet with Maki, they fail to notice the medal containing Uva's consciousness vowing revenge.
37	"Sleep, One Hundred Million, and the Birth Transfer"; Transliteration: "Nemuri to Ichioku to Bāsu Tenshoku" (Japanese: 眠りと1億とバース転職)	Satoshi Morota	Yasuko Kobayashi	June 5, 2011
As the Greeed establish Maki's home as their new lair, Mezool uses a drowsy Gamel to create her own hybrid Yummy and collect Cell Medals to maintain their new bodies. Concurrently, Goto becomes annoyed over Date's worsening condition and the latter focusing on raising ¥100,000,000 instead of seeing his doctor while Chiyoko is hit by an insomnia-inducing needle. The next day, Goto convinces Date to see his doctor while Eiji and Hina take Chiyoko to the hospital, where they find other insomniacs. After Ankh alerts him to a Yummy attack, Eiji leaves to join him and discovers the culprit behind the insomnia epidemic is the Uni-Armadillo Yummy. Due to Goto forcing Date not to use the Birth system, Eiji fights the monster alone until it flees while Date disavows Goto and leaves as well. As Goto tells Eiji of Date's condition, Date himself meets with Maki, who offers to pay him ¥100,000,000 for his services and gives him 50,000,000 as a down payment. By then, the Uni-Armadillo Yummy's victims fall asleep, generating a plethora of Cell Medals. Eiji and Goto successfully destroy the monster, but Date collects its Cell Medals for the Greeed.
38	"The Circumstances, a Farewell, and the Tearful Birth"; Transliteration: "Jijō to Wakare to Namida no Bāsu" (Japanese: 事情と別れと涙のバース)	Satoshi Morota	Yasuko Kobayashi	June 12, 2011
Date attacks Eiji and Goto, forcing them to retreat. Theorizing that Date is working with the Greeed to raise money to fund a hospital, Goto attempts to get a loan from Kougami, but he refuses in favor of allowing Date's desire to grow. Meanwhile, Maki and Date debate the former's desire to end the world before the latter is asked to join him and the Greeed in stealing the remaining Core Medals. The next day, Date and the Greeed confront Eiji and Goto. When Goto presents his theory on why he changed sides, Date disproves it, revealing he needs the money for surgery to resolve his cranial injury, before betraying the Greeed. Maki mortally wounds Date while the Greeed fight Eiji. Before passing out from his injuries, Date reaffirms his partnership with Goto and passes the mantle of Birth to him. Fueled by his new resolve, Goto accepts and uses the Birth system to help Eiji repel the Greeed. Afterward, Date receives ¥50 million from Kougami for his services. His goal complete, Date leaves to receive medical treatment, telling Eiji to remember his desire, while Goto resumes his training, confident that Date will return.
39	"The Nightmare, Security Cameras, and Ankh's Revenge"; Transliteration: "Akumu to Kanshi Kamera to Anku no Gyakushū" (Japanese: 悪夢と監視カメラとアンクの逆襲)	Hidenori Ishida	Yasuko Kobayashi	June 26, 2011
Ankh suffers a nightmare of Eiji stealing his medals and Ankh (Lost) absorbing him. Coming to, the frightened Greeed takes out his paranoia on Eiji. Meanwhile, Gonzo Shimoda, the new chairman of the neighborhood association, tells Eiji that he has installed surveillance cameras throughout the neighborhood due to reports of Ankh skulking about and tells him and Ankh to leave. Amidst this, Gonzo's perfectionist wife, Tomoko, uses the cameras to nitpick every minor imperfection she sees while the Shamo Yummy acts on her desire by attacking everyone she considers a bad neighbor. Due to the monster's presence, Shiraishi and Hina block the cameras, but earn the Shamo Yummy's wrath. Upon learning of this, Eiji tries to fight it, though it uses its unorthodox fighting style to overwhelm him until Goto and Satonaka arrive to help him to fend it off. The Shamo Yummy flees to meet with Tomoko after it indirectly attacks Shingo, causing Eiji's purple medals to take over and stop Ankh from possessing the detective.
40	"Control, a Birthday Party, and the Disappearing Ankh"; Transliteration: "Shihai to Tanjōkai to Kieru Anku" (Japanese: 支配と誕生会と消えるアンク)	Hidenori Ishida	Yasuko Kobayashi	July 3, 2011
Regaining his faculties, Eiji reluctantly allows Ankh to possess Shingo. However, they find the Shamo Yummy has taken control of the police and is now using them to enforce Tomoko's rules before retreating. Later, while recovering at Cous Coussier, Eiji discusses Shingo's well-being with Hina, promising he will get rid of Ankh to save Shingo. As the enthralled police arrive to evict them from the neighborhood and close down the restaurant, Goto sends out Kougami Foundation robots to spy on the Shimoda household and helps Eiji and Ankh escape so they can find the Shamo Yummy. After spending the night hiding out under a bridge, Eiji realizes the monster feeds on the surveillance footage and alerts Goto, who uses the robots to destroy the cameras to lure the Shamo Yummy out from Tomoko's home. With help from Goto and Satonaka, Eiji successfully destroys the monster. However, Ankh (Lost) attacks Ankh, revealing the Shamo Yummy's purpose was to make the latter lower his guard, before successfully absorbing him and seemingly achieve his complete form.
41	"Siblings, the Rescue, and Eiji Leaves"; Transliteration: "Kyōdai to Kyūshutsu to Eiji Saru" (Japanese: 兄妹と救出と映司去る)	Kenzo Maihara	Yasuko Kobayashi	July 10, 2011
Ankh (Lost) revels in his victory until he realizes he is missing one medal, which Ankh had given to Hina beforehand. Eiji uses the purple medals' power to force Ankh (Lost) to retreat. The former sends a Kougami Foundation robot to track him while he and Hina return to Cous Coussier, where they find Ankh had hidden Eiji's other Core Medals sometime prior. Upon learning of what happened, Shingo decides to take Ankh's place as Eiji's partner. However, Eiji secretly considers leaving him and Hina out of his fight with the Greeed now that he is safe. As Kougami observes Eiji and Shingo's work, he fears the situation will worsen the former's use of the purple medals. Meanwhile, Ankh (Lost) complains to Maki about being unable to fully absorb Ankh without his missing medal. Inspired, the latter creates the Ankylosaurus Yummy to attack Eiji now that Ankh is gone. As dawn breaks, the robot Eiji sent alerts him to Ankh (Lost)'s location. Goto and Satonaka join him in mounting a rescue attempt. However, the Ankylosaurus Yummy impedes them and overpowers Eiji. While Goto fights the Yummy, Maki arrives to tell Eiji he should worry about his purple medals instead of Ankh.
42	"Ice, Greeedification, and Broken Wings"; Transliteration: "Kōri to Gurīdo-ka to Kudaketa Tsubasa" (Japanese: 氷とグリード化と砕けた翼)	Kenzo Maihara	Yasuko Kobayashi	July 17, 2011
Maki reveals Eiji's purple medals are slowly turning him into a Greeed before Goto and Satonaka repel Maki and the Ankylosaurus Yummy. As she alerts Kougami to Maki's transformation, Goto tells the Izumis of Eiji's condition, leading Hina to conclude that Eiji needs to stop fighting. The next day, the Ankylosaurus Yummy attacks people to lure out Eiji. Despite the Izumis' best efforts, Eiji leaves to save the civilians. With Goto's help, Eiji succeeds in his task before fighting Ankh (Lost), who claims to have fully absorbed Ankh. While Goto destroys the Ankylosaurus Yummy, the Izumis arrive, with Shingo telling Hina that Eiji is fighting to save Ankh. Consumed by the purple medals' power, an enraged Eiji destroys the three medals containing Ankh (Lost)'s consciousness, killing him. As Hina calms Eiji down, Ankh uses Ankh (Lost)'s Cell Medals to create a new body based on Shingo's and approaches his former host with malevolent intent.
43	"The Vulture, the Confrontation, and Ankh Returns"; Transliteration: "Hagetaka to Tairitsu to Anku Ritānzu" (Japanese: ハゲタカと対立とアンクリターンズ)	Takayuki Shibasaki	Yasuko Kobayashi	July 24, 2011 (Note: This episode was the final Kamen Rider episode to air on analog television in most of Japan. Analog television broadcasts ceased at noon that day.)
Despite having his body back, Ankh realizes it is unstable due to Eiji destroying three of his medals. He then re-possesses Shingo and steals back the medal he gave Hina before Eiji invokes the purple medals' power, forcing him to leave. All throughout, Ankh notices a man named Kusada was watching them and later uses him to create the Hagetaka Yummy. When it starts attacking several women's boyfriends, Eiji, Goto, and Satonaka force it to retreat. As Kougami orders Goto to destroy the purple medals and Eiji experiences the effects of his "Greedification", Ankh meets with Maki, offering to retrieve Eiji's purple medals to help him achieve his goal in exchange for taking on all of the Greeed's Core Medals. The next day, the Hagetaka Yummy resumes its attacks. Eiji and Goto eventually destroy it, but Kusada and Ankh collect its Cell Medals and stop the Riders from pursuing them. Upon reaching a safe location, Kusada is revealed to have been possessed by Uva, who uses the Cell Medals to recreate his body. Following this, he and Ankh rejoin their fellow Greeed.
44	"Everyone Together, the Perfect Resurrection, and Your Greed"; Transliteration: "Zen'in Shūgō to Kanzen Fukkatsu to Kimi no Yoku" (Japanese: 全員集合と完全復活と君の欲)	Takayuki Shibasaki	Yasuko Kobayashi	July 31, 2011
Ankh warns his fellow Greeed of Eiji's ability to destroy their Core Medals and advises them to work together to regain their remaining medals from him. However, an irate Kazari refuses to listen and tries to fight back until Uva takes his personal medals back from him. As Mezool intervenes, Kazari reluctantly complies. Meanwhile, Eiji, Hina, and Goto meet with Kougami, who reveals the Greeed were originally homunculi that the First OOO ordered alchemists to create to test the power of desire amidst his plot to become a god before his own desire led to his downfall and Eiji must find his own desire to control the purple medals. Several days later, Eiji and Goto fight the Greeed while Hina, believing Ankh is beyond redemption, resolves to help the pair. Amidst the fight, Kazari regains all of his personal medals and his full power before destroying the Birth system. While trying to steal the rest of Eiji's medals however, the latter damages the medal containing Kazari's consciousness. As the Greeed retreat, Maki steals Kazari's undamaged medals and leaves him to die.
45	"The Surprise Attack, the Proto Birth, and the Desire of Love"; Transliteration: "Kishū to Puroto Bāsu to Ai no Yokubō" (Japanese: 奇襲とプロトバースと愛の欲望)	Satoshi Morota	Yasuko Kobayashi	August 7, 2011
Maki gives Ankh Kazari's medals and discusses how Ankh is evolving beyond the Greeed. Unbeknownst to them, Goto, wielding the prototype Birth system, and Satonaka prepare an assault on Maki's mansion. They successfully lure the Greeed outside while Eiji sneaks in to find Ankh. After retrieving a set of Kazari's medals, Ankh confronts him, revealing he intends to use all of the Core Medals' power to fuse himself with Shingo before fighting him. As the two battles collide, Maki transforms into the Kyouryu Greeed and steals most of Eiji's medals before leading the Greeed in retreating. Once they are safe, Maki gives Ankh the stolen medals, but the other Greeed demand them back. Over Maki's dismissal of their compulsion to consume everything around them in a futile attempt at fulfilling their personal desires, Mezool especially for her desire to better understand love, Ankh agrees, restoring Mezool and Gamel's full power. She subsequently abandons the group to abduct various mother/child pairs and siphon their love. Upon learning of this, Eiji and Goto fight her until the latter's technology fails him. Nonetheless, the former uses the purple medals' power to fatally wound Mezool, who soon dies in an arriving Gamel's arms.
46	"The Eiji Greeed, the Double Births, and Ankh's Desire"; Transliteration: "Eiji Gurīdo to Daburu Bāsu to Anku no Yokubō" (Japanese: 映司グリードとWバースとアンクの欲望)	Satoshi Morota	Yasuko Kobayashi	August 14, 2011
In response to Mezool's death, an enraged and distraught Gamel defies Maki to undergo a fruitless quest to revive her again, unaware that Eiji had destroyed the medal containing her consciousness and Maki damaged two of his personal medals. Due to Eiji disappearing following the fight with Mezool, Goto and Satonaka retrieve the repaired Birth system and attempt to stop Gamel without him. Though they are overpowered, Date returns and uses the prototype Birth system to help Goto permanently kill Gamel. Concurrently, Eiji finds himself on an island without his Rider equipment while Ankh finds Hina to ask permission to use Shingo's body, though she refuses. He later heads to the island where Eiji ended up. During their subsequent fight, Ankh reveals his true desire is to attain true life, which the Greeed lack. Though Eiji understands, admitting that Ankh truly helped him achieve his wish to save others, he refuses to let Ankh kill Shingo. Watching from afar, Maki gives Eiji more of his medals, completing the latter's Greeedification and causing him to go mad.
47	"The Red Crack, the Satisfaction, and Eiji's Vessel"; Transliteration: "Akai Hibi to Manzoku to Eiji no Utsuwa" (Japanese: 赤いヒビと満足と映司の器)	Ryuta Tasaki	Yasuko Kobayashi	August 21, 2011
As Ankh battles Eiji, the latter realizes his desire, but still cannot act against the purple medals' power. Though Ankh eventually and narrowly defeats Eiji, Maki arrives to steal the latter's remaining regular medals and attempts to kill him for the purple medals until Ankh distracts Maki long enough for Satonaka to get Eiji to safety. Seeing no more use for him, Maki steals most of Ankh's medals and damages the medal containing his consciousness before leaving to find Uva. Soon after, Hina finds a weakened Ankh, who assures her that Shingo is fine and reveals what Maki did to him, along with his imminent death. Concurrently, Satonaka brings Eiji to the Kougami Foundation while Kougami explains to Goto and Date his plan to have Eiji absorb the thousands of Cell Medals the organization has collected and utilize the First OOO's Core Medals despite the risk of strengthening his Greeed form. The pair disagree, but are forced to leave when Maki and a fully restored Uva attack the foundation. Eiji joins them, but is overpowered by Uva. As Goto and Date hold off the monsters, Eiji agrees to Kougami's plan.
48	"Tomorrow's Medals, Underwear, and Arms Held"; Transliteration: "Ashita no Medaru to Pantsu to Tsukamu Ude" (Japanese: 明日のメダルとパンツと掴む腕)	Ryuta Tasaki	Yasuko Kobayashi	August 28, 2011
Significantly strengthened by the Cell Medals and the First OOO's medals, Eiji easily defeats Uva. However, Maki intervenes and embeds more Core Medals within Uva against his will, causing him to flee. Eiji tries to pursue, but collapses from exhaustion before Ankh arrives to help him. Nonetheless, the purple medals destroy the First OOO's. Later that night, Ankh tells Hina not to divulge his imminent death to Eiji, but she becomes conflicted. The next day, Uva transforms into an uncontrollable medal creation machine. As Goto, Date, and Satonaka work to contain the chaos, Eiji and Ankh battle Maki. After failing to use the Cell Medals he absorbed to kill Maki, Eiji attempts to use the purple medals, but Ankh tells him to use his instead. Realizing Ankh is sacrificing himself to save him, Eiji agrees and uses Ankh's powers to send the purple medals back to Maki, causing a black hole to open long enough to kill him, absorb most of the medals, and destroy the machine. Eiji later awakens to find he has Ankh's broken medal. Realizing he achieved his desire, Eiji leaves Japan to resume his travels, resolving to resurrect Ankh.
