= Maki Mori =

Maki Mori may refer to:

- Maki Mori (announcer) (born 1981), Japanese announcer
- Maki Mori (soprano) (born 1970), Japanese soprano
- Maki Mori, a character in the 2001 film Turn
