= Japanese ship Maki =

Several ships have been named Maki (槙（槇） / まき, "podocarpaceae") :

- Japanese destroyer Maki (1917), an Enoki-class destroyer of the Imperial Japanese Navy
- Japanese destroyer Maki (1944), a Matsu-class destroyer of the Imperial Japanese Navy during World War II
- JDS Maki (PF-18, PF-298), a Kusu-class patrol frigate of the Japan Maritime Self-Defense Force, formerly USS Bath (PF-55)

== See also ==
- Maki (disambiguation)
