= Maki Sasaki =

Japanese manga artist and illustrator

Maki Sasaki (佐々木 マキ, Sasaki Maki; born October 18, 1946) is a Japanese illustrator, picture book writer, and manga artist. His avant-garde comics are characterized by non-sequiturs and absurd imagery, being called "anti-manga".

== Life and work ==
Sasaki was born in 1946, on the outskirts of Kobe, from a poor background. His parents ran a printing studio. He studied art at Kyoto City University of Arts, but dropped out, unable to afford the required art materials.

Sasaki admired the nonsense works of manga artist Shigeru Sugiura and the underground magazine Garo. In 1966, Sasaki made his debut as a manga artist with "Yoku Aru Hanashi", published in Garo. He did other stories for the same magazine, such as the 1967 one-shot "Tengoku De Miru Yume" (天国でみる夢).

Since 1973 Sasaki left manga to write and draw picture books, having published titles such as "Yappari Okami" and the "Monsieur Meuniere" series. Sasaki also illustrated book covers, among them some of the original editions of the early Haruki Murakami works.
