= Maki Gingoyon =

Filipino entertainer (born 1990)

- Born: 1990 (age 35–36); Cebu City, Philippines
- Other name: Maki Eve Mercedes
- Education: University of San Carlos (BS)
- Occupations: COO of My Transgender Date (2013–present); Beauty Queen
- Known for: My Transgender Date
- Beauty pageant titleholder
- Title: Super Sireyna Queen of the Sky 2013
- Years active: 2010–present
- Major competitions: Queen of Cebu 2010 (winner) Mandaue Gay Pageant 2017 (winner) Miss International Queen Philippines 2023 (Award for best advocacy)
- Website: makigingoyon.com

Maki Yurong Gingoyon (born 1990) is a Filipino transgender model, beauty queen, transgender activist, and businesswoman. She is the co-founder and chief operating officer of My Transgender Date.

== Early life and education ==
Gingoyon was born in Cebu City, Philippines. She graduated from University of San Carlos in 2009 with a Bachelor of Science in Psychology.

Starting in 2009, Gingoyon worked in a call center for four years. She lived as a woman during this time, however she was made to use the male bathroom, a situation which frustrated her.

== Pageantry ==
She was named Queen of Cebu Universe in 2010 at the age of 21. She won the title of Super Sireyna of the Sky on Eat Bulaga's 2013 weekly finals.

After a nine-year break from pageants, Gingoyon entered as the 10th contestant for Miss International Queen Philippines 2023.

== My Transgender Date ==
In 2013, Gingoyon and French businessman Cyril Mazur founded My Ladyboy Date, with its initial focus in Asia, as a space for trans women. In 2014, they launched My Transsexual Date, a second brand for My Ladyboy Date intended for a global audience. Both were available in 9 languages and had registered members from 190 countries in 2015. By 2020, 1 million users had joined, and over 100 million messages had been exchanged. My Transsexual Date was renamed My Transgender Date in 2021, to be more inclusive.

== Personal life ==
Gingoyon is a transgender woman and uses she/her pronouns.
