= Majitora! =

Japanese manga series

- Cover of volume one, showing Magical Curry (left) and their non-magical girl form Minami (right).

まじとら！
- Genre: Comedy, slice-of-life
- Manga
- Written by: Yutaka Kashii
- Published by: eBookJapan
- Magazine: Minna no Comic
- Original run: November 11, 2015 – January 18, 2019
- Volumes: 6

Majitora! (まじとら！), known in English as Magical Trans! is a magical girl manga series by Yutaka Kashii (香椎ゆたか, Kashii Yutaka).

It was serialised in eBookJapan's Minna no Comic magazine, and published by Manga-Mon in Indonesia.

== Plot ==
Minami Maki, a high school student, joins the Magical Girl Club, thinking it to be centred around cosplaying. However, much to his shock, he discovers that using an app the club's president invented turns anyone into a magical girl for real. Subsequently, he starts exploring his gender identity and expression in his magical girl form, along with his childhood friend Karin Saku and the club's president Chiyoko Teruto.

== Characters ==
Minami Maki (真木 南, Maki Minami)
Minami is the protagonist. As a magical girl, he uses the name Magical Curry, and when out and about as a regular girl, Maki Karii (雁井 真希, Karii Maki). Minami likes presenting as a girl, wearing girl's clothes, transforming a bit too often, and choosing to sleep each night as a girl. He suffers severe withdrawal symptoms when Karin persuades Chiyoko to disable Minami's app for several days.
Chiyoko Teruto (照門 千代子, Teruto Chiyoko)
President of the Magical Girl Club, and an especially cutting-edge inventor, Teruto is responsible for creating the Magical Girl transformation app. Her magical girl persona is named Foret Noire.
Karin Saku (佐久 かりん, Saku Karin)
The other member of the Magical Girl Club, and Maki's childhood friend. Her magical girl persona is named Pretty Saku-nyan.
Akira Asaba (麻羽 央, Asaba Akira)
The Club's purported arch-nemesis in his magical girl form, Kaiserk (カイザーク), the maniacal girl or demon lord. Asaba invented an app similar to that of Teruto's. Kaiserk named himself as a regular girl = Zakuro Kaitani (甲斐谷 ざくろ, Kaitani Zakuro) to Karii, Teruto and Saku when he, in girl form, encountered them on the beach. He freely admitted to Karii that it is not his real name. Later, on being busted by his older sister, Kaiserk asked her to call him Zakuro Kaiya, which uses the same kanji as the earlier name. Kaiserk, in contrast to Karii, has difficulty even looking at himself in a mirror, or experiencing too close or perverted contact with himself, while in girl form, or another girl.
Yui Furumi (Furumi Yui)
Fourth girl, a rich girl, to join the Magical Girl's club, in chapter 38. Instead of receiving the transformation cell-phone app Furumi-san chooses to become the club's manager, and soon sets up a chewter [fictional equivalent to twitter] account for the club.
Ren Shutou (Shutou Ren)
Furumi-san's personal maid, who keeps too close of a protective watch on Furumi and the people around her, thus spoiling Furumi's chances of forming friendships. She is first seen in chapter 41.
Sakura Asaba (Asaba Sakura)
Akira Asaba's older sister, old enough to have graduated and currently working as an office lady. First seen in chapter 43, visiting home. Sakura, once past her shock, she is overjoyed to have her younger brother become her younger sister, and hauls Kaiserk off shopping, in girl form, to dress him up like a younger sister should be dressed up, starting with getting Kaiserk his first bra.

== Reception ==
Halimun Muhammad of KAORI Nusantara notes Maki as one of the better-known gender-bending magical girls in animanga.
