= List of Kamen Rider OOO characters =

Kamen Rider OOO (仮面ライダーオーズ(ＯＯＯ), Kamen Raidā Ōzu) is a Japanese tokusatsu series that serves as the 21st installment in the Kamen Rider franchise and the 12th entry in the Heisei era.

== Main characters ==
=== Eiji Hino ===
Eiji Hino (火野 映司, Hino Eiji) is a politician's son who grew up in a lavish environment until his life was changed when he attempted to use his fortune to save a small African village, only to accidentally fund a civil war that killed a young girl he befriended. As a result, he renounced his lifestyle and became a wandering vagabond willing to help those in need. Returning to Japan to fund his travels, Eiji encounters the Greeed Ankh, who gives him the means to transform into Kamen Rider OOO and convinces him to fight Ankh's fellow Greeed in exchange for Cell Medals. Eiji agrees on the condition that he be allowed to use his Rider powers to help others and later allies himself with the Kougami Foundation amidst his battles with the Greeed.

After falling victim to Kiyoto Maki and the purple Core Medals due to his lack of selfish desires, Eiji slowly becomes a Greeed himself until the Kougami Foundation's president, Kousei Kougami, tells him that the only way to counteract the purple Core Medals is to acquire a desire of his own. Recalling his desire to gain the power to help others, Eiji eventually purges the purple Core Medals from his body, but loses his Rider powers and Ankh after the latter gives his life to help Eiji defeat Maki. Following the battle, Eiji realizes the power he sought comes from those he has bonds with and resumes his travels in the hopes of finding a way to resurrect Ankh.

During the events of the crossover film Kamen Rider × Kamen Rider Fourze & OOO: Movie War Mega Max, Eiji works with the Kougami Foundation as part of his efforts to resurrect Ankh. Eiji later receives help from a revived, future version of Ankh and regains his Rider powers while fighting Kamen Rider Poseidon. In the crossover film Kamen Rider Heisei Generations Final: Build & Ex-Aid with Legend Rider, Eiji creates a temporary simulacrum of Ankh via a replica body created by Kaisei Mogami. During the events of the 10th anniversary V-Cinema Kamen Rider OOO 10th: Core Medal of Resurrection, Eiji sacrifices himself to save a little girl from the First OOO, resurrecting Ankh in the process.

Utilizing three Core Medals in conjunction with the OOO Driver (オーズドライバー, Ōzu Doraibā) belt and the O-Scanner (オースキャナー, Ō Sukyanā) device, Eiji can transform into Kamen Rider OOO. While transformed, he can perform varying Scanning Charge (スキャニングチャージ, Sukyaningu Chāji) finishers. He also wields the Medajaribur (メダジャリバー, Medajaribā) sword, which allows him to perform the OOO Bash (オーズバッシュ, Ōzu Basshu) finisher. His personal vehicle is the Ride Vendor (ライドベンダー, Raido Bendā) motorcycle, which can switch between its vending machine-like Machine Vendor Mode (マシンベンダーモード, Mashin Bendā Mōdo) and its Honda Shadow-like Machine Bike Mode (マシンバイクモード, Mashin Baiku Mōdo). With the Core Medals, Eiji can either assume varying Combo (コンボ, Konbo) forms via a specific color-coded set or mix and match Core Medals of differing colors to assume varying Subspecies Forms (亜種形態, Ashu Keitai). In both cases, he combines different animal powers in combat. Combos of a single color initially quickly drain Eiji's stamina due to their increased power, though he gradually acclimates to them over time.

- Tatoba Combo (タトバコンボ, Tatoba Konbo): Eiji's red/yellow/green-colored default form accessed from the Taka (タカ; Hawk), Tora (トラ; Tiger), and Batta (バッタ; Grasshopper) Medals that grants superhuman agility. In any form using the Tora Medal, he is equipped with the twin forearm-mounted aerokinetic Tora Claws (トラクロー, Tora Kurō). His Scanning Charge in this form is the Tatoba Kick (タトバキック, Tatoba Kikku).
  - Ultimate Tatoba Combo (究極のタトバコンボ, Kyūkyoku no Tatoba Konbo): An enhanced version of Tatoba Combo accessed from the First OOO's versions of the Taka, Tora, and Batta Medals that increases the capabilities of the original form. While assuming this form, Eiji is referred to as the True OOO (真のオーズ, Shin no Ōzu).
  - Super Tatoba Combo (スーパータトバコンボ, Sūpā Tatoba Konbo): The evolved form of Tatoba Combo accessed from the Super Taka (スーパータカ, Sūpā Taka; Super Hawk), Super Tora (スーパートラ, Sūpā Tora; Super Tiger), and Super Batta (スーパーバッタ, Sūpā Batta; Super Grasshopper) Medals, which were created in the future, that grants chronokinesis. In this form, Eiji is equipped with an upgraded version of the Tora Claws called the Tora Claw Solids (トラクローソリッド, Tora Kurō Soriddo). His Scanning Charge in this form is the Super Tatoba Kick (スーパータトバキック, Sūpā Tatoba Kikku). This form first appears in the crossover film Kamen Rider × Kamen Rider Fourze & OOO: Movie War Mega Max.
- Gatakiriba Combo (ガタキリバコンボ, Gatakiriba Konbo): A green-colored auxiliary form accessed from Uva's Kuwagata (クワガタ; Stag beetle), Kamakiri (カマキリ; Mantis), and Batta Medals that grants the use of the self-duplicating Branch Shade (ブレンチシェイド, Burenchi Sheido) ability. In any form using the Kamakiri Medal, Eiji dual wields the twin Kamakiri Swords (カマキリソード, Kamakiri Sōdo). His Scanning Charge in this form is the Gatakiriba Kick (ガタキリバキック, Gatakiriba Kikku). The Kamakiri Medal first appears in the film Kamen Rider W Forever: A to Z/The Gaia Memories of Fate.
- Latorartar Combo (ラトラーターコンボ, Ratorātā Konbo): A yellow-colored auxiliary form accessed from Kazari's Lion (ライオン, Raion), Tora, and Cheetah (チーター, Chītā) Medals that grants the use of the thermokinetic Lio Diaz (ライオディアス, Raio Diasu) ability. This form is also required to tame the Ride Vendor's feral upgrade, the Toride Vendor (トライドベンダー, Toraido Bendā), which siphons the Core Medals' excess energy so that Eiji can maintain his transformation without overexerting himself. His Scanning Charge in this form is the Gouache Cross (ガッシュクロス, Gasshu Kurosu).
- Sagohzo Combo (サゴーゾコンボ, Sagōzo Konbo): A gray-colored auxiliary form accessed from Gamel's Sai (サイ; Rhinoceros), Gorilla (ゴリラ, Gorira), and Zou (ゾウ, Zō; Elephant) Medals that grants gyrokinesis. In any form using the Gorilla Medal, Eiji is equipped with a pair of self-propelling Gori Bagoon (ゴリバゴーン, Gori Bagōn) gauntlets. His Scanning Charge in this form is the Sagohzo Impact (サゴーゾインパクト, Sagōzo Inpakuto).
- Tajadol Combo (タジャドルコンボ, Tajadoru Konbo): Eiji's red-colored super form accessed from Ankh's Taka, Kujaku (クジャク; Peacock), and Condol (コンドル, Kondoru; Condor) Medals that grants a pair of bird wings and the ability to fire feather-like energy projectiles. In any form using the Kujaku Medal, he is equipped with the pyrokinetic Taja Spinner (タジャスピナー, Taja Supinā) buckler, which allows him to perform varying Giga Scan (ギガスキャン, Giga Sukyan) finishers. However, because of its increased power compared to the other single-colored Combos, using this form exhausts Eiji faster. His Scanning Charge in this form is the Prominence Drop (プロミネンスドロップ, Purominensu Doroppu). During the final battle, Eiji utilizes Ankh's last set of Core Medals, including the Taka Medal housing his consciousness, to assume an enhanced version of this form where he gains the use of a familiar based on his Greeed partner for combat assistance. This form first appears in the non-canonical crossover film Kamen Rider × Kamen Rider OOO & W Featuring Skull: Movie War Core.
  - Tajadol Combo Eternity (タジャドルコンボエタニティ, Tajadoru Konbo Etaniti): The evolved form of Tajadol Combo accessed from the Taka Eternity (タカエタニティ, Taka Etaniti; Hawk Eternity), Kujaku Eternity (クジャクエタニティ, Kujaku Etaniti; Peacock Eternity), and Condol Eternity (コンドルエタニティ, Kondoru Etaniti; Condor Eternity) Medals, which were created from Eiji and Ankh's bond, that equips Eiji with an upgraded version of the Taja Spinner called the Tajanity Spinner (タジャニティスピナー, Tajaniti Supinā) which allows him to perform varying Eternity Scan (エタニティスキャン, Etaniti Sukyan) finishers. His Scanning Charge in this form is the Eternitynence Drop (エタニティネンスドロップ, Etanitinensu Doroppu). This form appears exclusively in the V-Cinema anniversary film Kamen Rider OOO 10th: Core Medal of Resurrection where it is used by Ankh while possessing Eiji.
- Shauta Combo (シャウタコンボ, Shauta Konbo): A blue-colored auxiliary form accessed from Mezool's Shachi (シャチ; Orca), Denki Unagi (電気ウナギ; Electric Eel), (Note: In series, this medal is simply referred to as "Unagi" (ウナギ; Eel).) and Tako (タコ; Octopus) Medals that grants self-liquefaction capabilities. In any form using the Denki Unagi Medal, Eiji dual wields the twin electrokinetic Denki Unagi Whips (電気ウナギウィップ, Denki Unagi Wippu). His Scanning Charge in this form is the Oct Vanish (オクトバニッシュ, Okuto Banisshu).
- Putotyra Combo (プトティラコンボ, Putotira Konbo): Eiji's purple-colored final form accessed from Giru's Ptera (プテラ, Putera), Tricera (トリケラ, Torikera), and Tyranno (ティラノ, Tirano) Medals, which are unable to mix and match with other Core Medals, that grants cryokinesis and the ability to damage non-purple Core Medals. In this form, he wields the Medagabryu (メダガブリュー, Medagaburyū; Medal Biting Dragon), which has an Axe Mode (アックスモード, Akkusu Mōdo) for performing the Grand of Rage (グランド・オブ・レイジ, Gurando Obu Reiji) finisher and a Bazooka Mode (バズーカモード, Bazūka Mōdo) for performing the Strain Doom (ストレインドゥーム, Sutorein Dūmu) finisher. He later gains the ability to wield the Medagabryu in his other Combos as he slowly becomes a Greeed, though only Putotyra Combo can control its Bazooka Mode. However, prolonged use of this form puts Eiji at risk of succumbing to a berserker state and hastens his transformation into a Greeed. His Scanning Charge in this form is the Blasting Freezer (ブラスティングフリーザ, Burasutingu Furīza).
- Tamashiy Combo (タマシーコンボ, Tamashī Konbo): A red/gold-colored special form accessed from the Taka, Imagin (イマジン, Imajin), and Shocker (ショッカー, Shokkā) Medals that grants ergokinesis. In this form, Eiji is equipped with a pair of shoulder-mounted Ore no Tsuno (オレノツノ, Ore no Tsuno; My Horns) oni horns. His Scanning Charge in this form is the Tamashiy Bomber (魂ボンバソーマ・ヴェノム, Tamashii Bonbā). This form appears exclusively in the anniversary film OOO, Den-O, All Riders: Let's Go Kamen Riders.
- Burakawani Combo (ブラカワニコンボ, Burakawani Konbo): An orange-colored special form accessed from the Cobra (コブラ, Kobura), Kame (カメ; Turtle), and Wani (ワニ; Crocodile) Medals that grants the use of the self-healing Soma Venom (ソーマ・ヴェノム, Sōma Venomu) ability. In this form, Eiji wields the Burahngi (ブラーンギー, Burāngī) pungi, which allows him to summon a giant hooded cobra from the back of the Snaker Bangs (スネーカーバング, Sunēkā Bangu) turban/ponytail for combat assistance. His Scanning Charge in this form is the Warning Ride (ワーニングライド, Wāningu Raido). This form appears exclusively in the film Kamen Rider OOO Wonderful: The Shogun and the 21 Core Medals and the crossover film Kamen Rider × Kamen Rider Wizard & Fourze: Movie War Ultimatum.

Eiji Hino is portrayed by Shu Watanabe (渡部 秀, Watanabe Shū).

=== Ankh ===
Ankh (アンク, Anku) (Note: From the Hindi word for "eye" (आँख ā̃ṅkh), as in a hawk's eye) is a dishonest and foulmouthed bird-themed Greeed who believes he has the right to take whatever he wants, sees people for their flaws, and is at odds with the other Greeed due to being a wild card. As revealed in the tie-in novel Novel: Kamen Rider OOO, after the First OOO removed his tenth Core Medal to finalize his creation 800 years before the events of the series, Ankh met a blind girl and created a Yummy to restore her sight out of empathy due to his own dulled senses. However, Ankh regretted his decision after the girl died of fright upon learning that her sight came from people that the Yummy murdered for their eyes. Honoring the girl's last request to protect people, Ankh sided with the First OOO to battle the other Greeed until the First OOO betrayed him to steal his Core Medals. After the First OOO was overwhelmed by the Core Medals' power and sealed the other Greeed, Ankh's right forearm and the Taka Medal housing his consciousness were severed from his body, which was sealed separately. As a result, Ankh lost most of his power.

When the Greeed are unsealed in the present, Ankh finds he cannot reform his missing body and steals the other Greeed's Core Medals to handicap them, only to accidentally lose his remaining Taka Medal to Eiji. Ankh intends to regain his other lost Core Medals and power by enlisting Eiji as the new Kamen Rider OOO, but the latter proves difficult to manipulate, so Ankh reluctantly cooperates with him to save lives on the condition that they gather Cell Medals so Ankh can maintain his form. Along the way, Ankh possesses the body of half-dead Detective Shingo Izumi to blend in with humans, which allows him to fully experience human sensations, but causes him to grow envious of humans. However, Ankh slowly finds himself unable to harm Eiji and the detective's sister Hina without a substantial reason.

As he regains some of his Core Medals, Ankh discovers what happened to the rest of his body after it develops a mind of its own and turns into Ankh (Lost). They subsequently compete to reabsorb each other under the belief that the weaker one will disappear forever. Ankh (Lost) initially proves victorious, but Eiji uses the purple Core Medals' power to kill him in retaliation for Ankh's apparent death, shattering a full set of his Core Medals in the process. Despite being able to reconstitute himself, Ankh finds he lost some of his power due to the Core Medals he lost and repossesses Shingo before seemingly joining Maki and the other Greeed in the hopes of secretly manipulating Eiji into destroying the other Greeed so he can use all of their Core Medals to fully fuse himself with Shingo and become a true conscious being.

While carrying out his scheme, Ankh unconditionally gives the other Greeed their Core Medals back as a result of his being spoiled by his experiences with human senses and disgusted with his fellow Greeed. However, he finds himself unable to kill Eiji due to their history together and his newfound capacity for feeling deeper emotions leads him to betray Maki, who responds by damaging the Taka Medal housing Ankh's consciousness. In spite of this, Ankh accepts his death and gives Eiji his remaining three Core Medals to counteract the latter's purple Core Medals long enough for Eiji to defeat Maki. After aiding him in the fight, Ankh's spirit appears before Eiji to express gratitude to him and the others for allowing him to live and die as a human, before giving him and Hina his broken Taka Medal.

During the events of the crossover film Kamen Rider × Kamen Rider Fourze & OOO: Movie War Mega Max, a revived future version of Ankh travels back in time to help Eiji defeat Kamen Rider Poseidon. During the events of the V-Cinema Kamen Rider OOO 10th: Core Medal of Resurrection, Eiji sacrifices himself to fully resurrect Ankh.

In his true form, known as Ankh (Greeed) (アンク（グリード態）, Anku (Gurīdo-tai)), Ankh possesses pyrokinesis and flight capabilities. His bird-themed Yummy attack people to extract an attribute and feed it to their host, similarly to how mother birds feed their chicks. While possessing Shingo, Ankh uses his host's iPhone 4 and an iPad to gather information on the current era as well as keep track of who owns which Core Medals before receiving the O Medal Holder (オーメダルホルダー, Ō Medaru Horudā) case from Hina to store Core Medals in.

Ankh is portrayed by Ryosuke Miura (三浦 涼介, Miura Ryōsuke).

=== Hina Izumi ===
Hina Izumi (泉 比奈, Izumi Hina) is an aspiring fashion designer who works at the Cous Coussier restaurant and possesses superhuman strength, which she expresses embarrassment towards. Following the Greeed's awakening, her brother Shingo's death, and Ankh possessing him, Eiji initially tries to hide the truth from her before eventually telling her and vowing to save him. Realizing Eiji's reasons for looking after Ankh and Shingo, Hina convinces Eiji to work at Cous Coussier so she can care for her brother's body and use her strength to keep Ankh in line. She also comes to realize that she relies on Eiji's desire to help to an unhealthy degree, takes steps to ensure he does not blindly sacrifice himself for other people's sake, and cares for Ankh as if he were her brother.

Hina Izumi is portrayed by Riho Takada (高田 里穂, Takada Riho).

=== Kamen Rider Birth ===
Kamen Rider Birth (仮面ライダーバース, Kamen Raidā Bāsu) is an exoskeletonal suit created by Kiyoto Maki powered by Cell Medals as opposed to Kamen Rider OOO's Core Medals. Operators of the Birth System utilize the Birth Driver (バースドライバー, Bāsu Doraibā) belt to transform where they wield the Birth Buster (バースバスター, Bāsu Basutā) machine gun, which uses Cell Medals as ammo, and gain the ability to summon Birth CLAWs (バース・CLAWs, Bāsu Kurōzu; Cannon/Leg/Arm/Wing System) units, which function as magnets for Cell Medals. Summoning all six Birth CLAWs units at once allow the operator to either assume the heavily armed Kamen Rider Birth-Day (仮面ライダーバース・デイ, Kamen Raidā Bāsu Dei) form or combine them to form the scorpion-themed CLAWs Sasori (CLAWs・サソリ, Kurōzu Sasori) mecha for combat assistance. Their finisher is the Cell Burst (セルバースト, Seru Bāsuto).

- Crane Arm (クレーンアーム, Kurēn Āmu): A right shoulder-mounted unit that forms the tail of CLAWs Sasori. This unit first appears in the non-canonical crossover film Kamen Rider × Kamen Rider OOO & W Featuring Skull: Movie War Core.
- Breast Cannon (ブレストキャノン, Buresuto Kyanon): A chest-mounted unit that forms the head of CLAWs Sasori.
- Drill Arm (ドリルアーム, Doriru Āmu): A right forearm-mounted unit that forms the stinger of CLAWs Sasori.
- Caterpillar Leg (キャタピラレッグ, Kyatapira Reggu): A pair of leg-mounted units that form the lower body of CLAWs Sasori.
- Shovel Arm (ショベルアーム, Shoberu Āmu): A left forearm-mounted unit that forms the right claw of CLAWs Sasori.
- Cutter Wing (カッターウイング, Kattā Uingu): A back-mounted unit that forms the left claw of CLAWs Sasori.

Additionally, Maki developed a prototypical version called Kamen Rider Birth Prototype (仮面ライダーバース・プロトタイプ, Kamen Raidā Bāsu Purototaipu), which can only summon the Crane Arm and Breast Cannon units.

==== Shintaro Goto ====
Shintaro Goto (後藤 慎太郎, Gotō Shintarō) is a former police officer who works for the Kougami Foundation to keep the world safe from the Greeed and eventually becomes Eiji's friend. Despite initially using the prototype Birth system, Goto eventually succeeds his mentor Akira Date as the current operator of the complete Birth System.

In the web series Birth of Birth X: Prologue and OOO 10th Kamen Rider Birth: Secret Story of the Birth of Birth X and the V-Cinema Kamen Rider OOO 10th: Core Medal of Resurrection, Goto acquires a combination of the Birth Driver and the X Unit (Ｘユニット, Ekkusu Unitto) adapter called the Birth Driver X (バースドライバーX, Bāsu Doraibā Ekkusu), which he can use in conjunction with the man-made Ebi (エビ; Shrimp), Kani (カニ; Crab), and Sasori (サソリ; Scorpion) Medals to transform into his final form; Kamen Rider Birth X (仮面ライダーバースX, Kamen Raidā Bāsu Ekkusu). While transformed, he gains the ability to summon the right forearm-mounted Kani Arm (カニアーム, Kani Āmu) unit, which allows him to perform the Kani Core Burst (カニコアバースト, Kani Koa Bāsuto) finisher.

Shintaro Goto is portrayed by Asaya Kimijima (君嶋 麻耶, Kimijima Asaya).

==== Akira Date ====
Akira Date (伊達 明, Date Akira) is a combat medic who prefers getting his job done perfectly rather than enjoying what he does. He initially traveled the world before returning to Japan, where he was hired by the Kougami Foundation to become the first user of the Kamen Rider Birth system with Goto as his apprentice. Due to a cranial injury preventing him from using the Birth System for extended periods of time, Date eventually leaves Japan to undergo a life-saving surgery and passes the mantle of Birth to Goto. Following its success, he returns months later and uses the prototype Birth System to assist Goto in his fight against the Greeed.

As of the V-Cinemas Kamen Rider Zi-O: Geiz Majesty and Kamen Rider OOO 10th: Core Medal of Resurrection, Date acquires a second complete version of the Birth Driver.

Akira Date is portrayed by Hiroaki Iwanaga (岩永 洋昭, Iwanaga Hiroaki).

== Recurring characters ==
=== Greeed ===
The Greeed (グリード, Gurīdo) (Note: From the English word "greed") are animal-themed homunculi created by the First OOO via the power of 50 multicolored Core Medal (コアメダル, Koa Medaru) coins as part of his plan to achieve godhood 800 years prior to the series. Originally mindless, the Greeed attained sentience after one Core Medal from each of their respective sets was destroyed. However, they lack true life and crave endlessly, cursed with a void in them that can never be filled, possess limited sensory input, and are incapable of feeling deeper emotions such as love. As such, the Greeed became bent on consuming everything around them in a vain attempt at experiencing what humans normally take for granted, only to be sealed by the First OOO after he stole their Core Medals and was overwhelmed by their power.

When the seal is undone in the present, Ankh steals some of his fellow Greeed's Core Medals to handicap them due to his being unable to completely reform his body. In response, the remaining Greeed create Yummy to find Ankh, regain their stolen Core Medals, and gather enough silver-colored Cell Medal (セルメダル, Seru Medaru) coins to maintain their physical forms. Upon realizing how much humanity has changed in the intervening years, the Greeed mimic human forms to blend in.

Each Greeed possesses nine Core Medals, which allow them to maintain their powers and armored forms so long as they do not lose them. If they lose all but one, they become unable to maintain their Greeed forms and suffer terrible pain. If a Greeed absorbs too many foreign Core Medals at once and lack most, if not all, of their personal nine to counteract them, their body will destabilize from the excess power and transform them into a giant chimeric monster called a Mega Greeed (巨大グリード, Kyodai Gurīdo). If all five Core Medal sets are incorporated into a Greeed's body, they will transform into a giant container called a Medal Vessel (メダルの器, Medaru no Utsuwa), which converts all nearby matter into Cell Medals. Moreover, a Greeed's consciousness is housed in one of their corresponding head-based Core Medals. Destruction of this Core Medal will permanently destroy the Greeed. If their body is destroyed, but the Core Medal housing their consciousness remains, it can act autonomously and possess human bodies.

During the events of the V-Cinema anniversary film Kamen Rider OOO 10th: Core Medal of Resurrection, the Greeed are revived alongside the First OOO, who absorbs them for their power before Goda does so in turn and Ankh kills Goda.

==== Uva ====
Uva (ウヴァ) (Note: From the Japanese word ubau (奪う, "to snatch away")) is a hot-headed, insect-themed Greeed. Having lost the most Core Medals out of all the Greeed, Uva is the first to try and find Ankh in the hopes of regaining them. After Kazari kills Gamel and Mezool while in pursuit of his newfound desire to evolve, Uva decides to act on his own and find his own form of evolution. Despite coming into possession of some of Gamel and Mezool's Core Medals, Uva saves them in favor of seeding people with Kuzu Yummy and using them to produce a massive amount of Cell Medals to drastically increase his power and resurrect the fallen Greeed. Although he succeeds, Gamel and Mezool betray him and join Kazari and Ankh (Lost) in destroying his body.

As the Kuwagata Medal housing his consciousness survived his destruction, Uva possesses a man named Kusada (草田) and uses him to recreate his body before supporting Ankh in his fight against Kazari. Along the way, he regains all of his Core Medals, but is mortally wounded by Eiji via the First OOO's Core Medals and overloaded by Kiyoto Maki via the other Greeed's Core Medals. As a result, Uva is forcibly transformed into the Medal Vessel Chaos Form (メダルの器 暴走形態, Medaru no Utsuwa Bōsō Keitai), which Eiji eventually destroys.

In his complete form, Uva possesses electrokinesis and superhuman jumping. His insect-themed Yummy pull themselves out of their host's bodies, then they either seek out and physically consume the object of their progenitor's desire or carry out an extreme version of the desire before molting into their complete forms in both cases. Additionally, Uva is the only Greeed who chooses to create and command Kuzu Yummy.

Uva is portrayed by Yūsuke Yamada (山田 悠介, Yamada Yūsuke).

==== Kazari ====
Kazari (カザリ) (Note: From the Japanese word kazaru (飾る, "to decorate")) is a feline-themed Greeed and an arrogant schemer. While searching for his missing Core Medals, Kazari meets Kiyoto Maki and aligns himself with the scientist, diverting from the Greeed's original goal of consumption to evolution. This new ideology leads to Kazari using Gamel, Mezool, and Uva as test subjects to experiment with the idea of a Greeed possessing foreign Core Medals. Despite indirectly killing Gamel and Mezool, Kazari deems the experiment a success as he absorbs three of Mezool's Core Medals and two of Gamel's to undergo a controlled evolution. Using his new powers, Kazari temporarily regains most of his Core Medals and his complete form. Following this, he eventually recruits Ankh (Lost) and convinces Maki to leave the Kougami Foundation. Though Uva steals his additional Core Medals to successfully resurrect Gamel and Mezool, Kazari convinces the pair to join him and Maki. He eventually regains his Core Medals and rebels against Maki until Eiji uses the purple Core Medals' power to damage the Lion Medal housing Kazari's consciousness. He survives the attack, but Maki steals his remaining intact Core Medals and leaves him to die.

In his complete form, Kazari possesses aerokinesis, superhuman speed, and the ability to use his dreadlocks like tendrils. His feline-themed Yummy are parasitic in nature, possessing the host and forcing them to excessively indulge in their desire until they reach their complete form and consume the host. After absorbing Mezool and Gamel's Core Medals, Kazari gains their powers and the ability to create hybrid Yummy.

Kazari is portrayed by Taito Hashimoto (橋本 汰斗, Hashimoto Taito).

==== Gamel ====
Gamel (ガメル, Gameru) (Note: Gamel's name comes from the Japanese word gameru (がめる, "to pilfer").) is a heavy mammal-themed Greeed who possesses the mentality of a dimwitted, spoiled child and an affinity towards Mezool. Due to his low intelligence, he is easily manipulated by Kazari into absorbing Mezool and Uva's Core Medals. While they temporarily restore his complete form, Gamel suffers from energy overload until Mezool absorbs him.

Following Mezool's transformation into a Mega Greeed and subsequent destruction, Gamel's Core Medals are divided amongst the surviving Greeed until Uva eventually revives him and Mezool. When Kazari and Ankh (Lost) convince Mezool to join their cause, Gamel joins them out of loyalty to her. After Ankh recovers and gives Gamel the rest of his remaining Core Medals and Mezool is killed by Kamen Rider OOO, a grief-stricken Gamel attacks people using his Cell Medal production powers in a futile attempt to resurrect her. However, Kiyoto Maki damages two of his Core Medals, including the Sai Medal housing Gamel's consciousness, before Goto and Date work together to permanently kill him.

In his complete form, Gamel possesses gyrokinesis, can form a trunk from his face, the ability to consume inedible matter, superhuman strength, and the ability to turn anything he touches into Cell Medals. Unlike the other Greeed, he uses his own body to create his heavy mammal-themed Yummy upon observing a particular behavior he wants to mimic, satiating his own desires. As a result, the created Yummy are composed of a single Cell Medal.

Gamel is portrayed by Hiroyuki Matsumoto (松本 博之, Matsumoto Hiroyuki).

==== Mezool ====
Mezool (メズール, Mezūru) (Note: From the Japanese word mezuru (愛ずる, "to love")) is a marine animal-themed Greeed and the only female of the group. She comes off as the kindest member of her kind due in part to her methods being able to provide enough Cell Medals for all of them, and serves as a mother figure as her desire is to know and feel true love. After losing most of her remaining Core Medals to Kazari and being attacked by Uva, Mezool discovers Gamel has absorbed her Core Medals and absorbs him in turn. However, due to the excess number of foreign Core Medals, she transforms into the mindless Mega Greeed Out of Control (巨大グリード暴走態, Kyodai Gurīdo Bōsōtai). She is eventually destroyed by Kamen Riders OOO and Birth, with the Core Medals that contributed to her transformation being divided amongst Ankh, Uva, and Kazari.

After Uva manages to revive her and Gamel, Mezool sides with Kazari, Ankh (Lost), and Gamel to regain her Core Medals until Ankh returns them to her. Spurred by Kiyoto Maki, she breaks off from Gamel to achieve her desire by abducting several mother/child pairs and sealing them in her Yummy eggs to drain the love and life from them. However, Eiji uses the purple Core Medals' power to shatter a full set of her Core Medals, including the Shachi Medal housing Mezool's consciousness, permanently killing her.

In her complete form, Mezool possesses hydrokinesis and self-liquefaction capabilities. Her marine animal-themed Yummy, which start out as roe-like eggs, feed indirectly off their host's desire while forming a "nest" that incubates over a period of time while the host indulges their desire. Their presence is mostly concealed until the Yummy eggs hatch into their complete forms and are compelled to return to Mezool and break up into many Cell Medals for her and the Greeed to ingest.

Mezool is voiced by Yukana (ゆかな) while her human form is portrayed by Honoka Miki (未来 穂香, Miki Honoka).

==== Ankh (Lost) ====
Ankh (Lost) (アンク（ロスト）, Anku (Rosuto)) is a Greeed that came into being when Ankh transferred the Taka Medal housing his consciousness into his right forearm before it was disconnected from the rest of his body when he and the other Greeed were sealed. Without Ankh's consciousness, the body entered a state of suspended animation and eventually became a separate being with a child-like mind and the desire to become whole. After Kougami extracts one of his remaining Core Medals, Ankh (Lost) awakens, travels across Japan in search of Ankh, and makes himself known after creating Yummy that act on his desires. He later allies himself with Kazari and Kiyoto Maki, replicating the form of a young boy to blend in with society while his personality gradually develops into one similar to Ankh's. Combined with tutoring from Kazari and the other Greeed, Ankh (Lost) executes a complex and nearly successful plan to absorb Ankh while his guard is down. Nevertheless, he finds that Ankh continues to resist destruction. In his attempt to complete his victory, Ankh (Lost) is eventually destroyed by Eiji, who uses the purple Core Medals' power to shatter a full set of his Core Medals.

Compared to the original, Ankh (Lost) retains almost all of Ankh's powers and his bird-themed Yummy share the same attributes as Ankh's. Additionally, his Greeed form resembles that of Ankh's, albeit with an incomplete right side.

Ankh (Lost) is voiced by Miyu Irino (入野 自由, Irino Miyu) while his human form is portrayed by Hikari Tobita (飛田 光里, Tobita Hikari).

==== Yummy ====
The Yummy (ヤミー, Yamī) (Note: From the English words "yummy", "mummy" (マミー, mamī), and the Japanese word yami (闇, darkness)) are monsters that feed on human desire and serve as subordinates to the Greeed, who create them by using Cell Medals on primarily human hosts. While they have different methods for doing so, all Yummy seek to use their host to evolve from their shared mummy-themed Shiro Yummy (白ヤミー, Shiro Yamī; White Yummy) forms into their individual complete forms and empower themselves. Being the product of the Greeed that created them, the Yummy will take on characteristics of their creator's Core Medals. As such, if a Greeed possesses multiple types of Core Medals or multiple Greeed use the same host, they can create chimeric hybrid Yummy. If a host's primary desire changes, the Yummy will split off into multiple similar Yummy, with the original pursuing the original desire while the additional Yummy pursue the new desires.

Additionally, Uva produces Shiro Yummy-like Kuzu Yummy (屑ヤミー, Kuzu Yamī; Waste Yummy) by breaking Cell Medals in half. While they are weaker than regular Yummy, Kuzu Yummy are easier to create en masse, harder to destroy with physical attacks, and do not require hosts.

- Kamakiri Yummy (カマキリヤミー, Kamakiri Yamī): A mantis-themed Yummy capable of creating scythe-like energy projectiles that Uva created from an unnamed woman's desire to buy a particular necklace from a jewelry store. The Kamakiri Yummy is destroyed by Kamen Rider OOO. The Kamakiri Yummy is voiced by Tomoaki Maeno (前野 智昭, Maeno Tomoaki) while the unnamed woman is portrayed by Maaya Natsuno (夏野 まあや, Natsuno Maaya).
- Otoshibumi Yummy (オトシブミヤミー, Otoshibumi Yamī): A giant non-anthropomorphic leaf-rolling weevil-themed Yummy with two arm-like mouths that Uva created from an unnamed robber's desire for money. The Otoshibumi Yummy is destroyed by Kamen Rider OOO. The unnamed robber is portrayed by Tōta Isa (伊佐 陶太, Isa Tōta).
- Neko Yummy (ネコヤミー, Neko Yamī): A cat-themed Yummy with an obese body capable of withstanding slicing attacks that Kazari created from the gluttonous Monta Fukuji (腹時 門太, Fukuji Monta). The Neko Yummy is separated from Fukuji and destroyed by Kamen Rider OOO. The Neko Yummy is voiced by Ibuki (勇吹輝) while Monta Fukuji is portrayed by Jubun Fukuzawa (福沢 重文, Fukuzawa Jūbun).
- Piranha Yummy (ピラニアヤミー, Pirania Yamī): A school of non-anthropomorphic namesake-themed Yummy. Mezool created one group from shopaholic Haruka Yamano (山野 遥, Yamano Haruka) before they are destroyed by Kamen Rider OOO. Mezool later creates another group from an unnamed con artist while OOO is distracted by the Siamneko Yummy, which succeed in their goal of feeding the Greeed Cell Medals. Haruka Yamano is portrayed by Moeki Tsuruoka (寉岡 萌希, Tsuruoka Moeki).
- Bison Yummy (バイソンヤミー, Baison Yamī): A namesake-themed Yummy with immense strength and the ability to create shockwaves capable of throwing objects that Gamel created after seeing a married couple fight. The Bison Yummy is destroyed by Kamen Rider OOO.
- Same Yummy (サメヤミー, Same Yamī): A school of shark-themed Yummy capable of liquefying solid material in order to swim through it, moving at superhuman speed, and firing pressurized water balls from their mouths that Mezool created from Kougami Biotech Laboratory worker and mad bomber Toru Tadano (只野 通, Tadano Tōru). Initially hatching one by one before doing so en masse, the first Same Yummy succeeds in its purpose of feeding the Greeed Cell Medals while Kamen Rider OOO destroys the remaining Same Yummies. Toru Tadano is portrayed by Makoto Sakamoto (坂本 真, Sakamoto Makoto).
- Ageha Yummy (アゲハヤミー, Ageha Yamī): A swallowtail butterfly-themed Yummy with flight capabilities and explosive pollen that Uva created from blogger Keisuke Tsukuba (筑波 敬介, Tsukuba Keisuke)'s desire to become famous. The Ageha Yummy is destroyed by Kamen Rider OOO. The Ageha Yummy is voiced by Yoshimasa Hosoya (細谷 佳正, Hosoya Yoshimasa) while Keisuke Tsukuba is portrayed by Shinnosuke Abe (阿部 進之介, Abe Shin'nosuke).
- Siamneko Yummy (シャムネコヤミー, Shamuneko Yamī): A Siamese cat-themed Yummy with scalpel-like claws that Kazari created from surgeon Kei Tamura (田村 ケイ, Tamura Kei), who feels her father, the director of the hospital she works at, is holding her back due to her pride and lack of fear for her patients' well being. The Siamneko Yummy is separated from Tamura and destroyed by Kamen Rider OOO. The Siamneko Yummy is voiced by Sakura Yoshioka (吉岡 さくら, Yoshioka Sakura) while Kei Tamura is portrayed by Kyoko Matsunaga (松永 京子, Matsunaga Kyōko).
- Rikugame Yummy (リクガメヤミー, Rikugame Yamī): A tortoise-themed Yummy who can retract into his shell and spin at high-speeds that Kazari tricked Gamel into creating to gain Mezool's approval. The Rikugame Yummy is destroyed by Kamen Rider OOO.
- Kabuto Yummy (カブトヤミー, Kabuto Yamī): A rhinoceros beetle-themed Yummy with dense armor-like skin that Uva created from Rie Shiratori (白鳥 梨恵, Shiratori Rie)'s initial desire to become stronger. The Kabuto Yummy is destroyed by Kamen Riders OOO and Birth. The Kabuto Yummy is voiced by Kenta Miyake (三宅 健太, Miyake Kenta) while Rie Shiratori is portrayed by Maya Okano (岡野 真也, Okano Maya).
  - Kuwagata Yummy (クワガタヤミー, Kuwagata Yamī): A stag beetle-themed Yummy with dense armor-like skin and electrokinesis that split off from the Kabuto Yummy in response to Shiratori's new desire to eliminate her kendo teacher's bride. The Kuwagata Yummy is destroyed by Kamen Rider Birth. The Kuwagata Yummy is voiced by Nobuyuki Hiyama (檜山 修之, Hiyama Nobuyuki).
- Lion-Kurage Yummy (ライオンクラゲヤミー, Raion-Kurage Yamī): A lion/jellyfish-themed hybrid Yummy with photo-thermokinesis and the ability to produce small, non-anthropomorphic, self-replicating jellyfish-like Kurage Yummy (クラゲヤミー, Kurage Yamī) that Kazari created from fugitive Toichi Yamagane (山金 トイチ, Yamagane Toichi)'s desire to get revenge on Shingo Izumi for arresting him and his ex-partner for betraying him. The Lion-Kurage Yummy is separated from Yamagane by Kamen Rider Birth and destroyed by Kamen Rider OOO. The Lion-Kurage Yummy is voiced by Donpei Tsuchihira (土平 ドンペイ, Tsuchihira Donpei), who also portrays Toichi Yamagane.
- Batta Yummy (バッタヤミー, Batta Yamī): A grasshopper-themed Yummy with a warped hero mentality, superhuman speed, electrokinesis, and superhuman jumping that Uva created from Susumu Kanbayashi (神林 進, Kanbayashi Susumu)'s desire for justice after he attended law school, but failed his bar exam. The Batta Yummy is destroyed by Kamen Rider OOO. The Batta Yummy is voiced by Daisuke Endō (遠藤 大輔, Endō Daisuke) while Susumu Kanbayashi is portrayed by Mitsunori Isaki (伊嵜 充則, Isaki Mitsunori).
- Ei-Sai Yummy (エイサイヤミー, Ei Sai Yamī): A stingray/rhinoceros-themed hybrid Yummy with proficiency in swimming, dense skin, and the ability to lay eggs that hatch into non-anthropomorphic stingray-like Small Ei Yummy (エイヤミー（小）, Ei Yamī (Shō)) that Kazari created from cosmetics company researcher Yumi Sakura (佐倉 優美, Sakura Yumi)'s desire to become more beautiful than her younger sister Rei (麗). After Kamen Rider Birth removes the Cell Medals making up its rhinoceros half, the Ei-Sai Yummy transforms into the giant non-anthropomorphic devil ray-esque Itomakiei Yummy (イトマキエイヤミー, Itomakiei Yamī) before it is destroyed by Kamen Rider OOO. The Ei-Sai Yummy is voiced by Kohsuke Toriumi (鳥海 浩輔, Toriumi Kōsuke) while Yumi Sakura is portrayed by Erena (エレナ).
- Oumu Yummy (オウムヤミー, Ōmu Yamī): A series of parrot-themed Yummy that can fly, possess pyrokinesis, and petrification capabilities. Ankh (Lost) creates a blue-colored version from punch drunk boxer Kazuki Okamura (岡村 一樹, Okamura Kazuki)'s desire to continue fighting despite his condition before it is destroyed by Kamen Riders OOO and Birth. Ankh (Lost) later creates a red Oumu Yummy from an unknown host before it is also destroyed by Kamen Rider OOO. Both versions of the Oumu Yummy are voiced by Tomohiro Tsuboi (坪井 智浩, Tsuboi Tomohiro) while Kazuki Okamura is portrayed by Hiroaki Fukui (福井 博章, Fukui Hiroaki).
- Ika-Jaguar Yummy (イカジャガーヤミー, Ika Jagā Yamī): A squid/jaguar-themed hybrid Yummy with superhuman strength and agility and a spear for a right hand that Kazari created from former Shocker Combatman turned Kougami Foundation employee In Sendo (千堂 院, Sendō In)'s desire to defeat the Kamen Riders. The Ika-Jaguar Yummy is destroyed by Kamen Rider OOO and the CLAWS Sasori. The Ika-Jaguar Yummy is voiced by Banjō Ginga (銀河 万丈, Ginga Banjō) while In Sendo is portrayed by Seminosuke Murasugi (村杉 蝉之介, Murasugi Seminosuke).
- Shachi-Panda Yummy (シャチパンダヤミー, Shachi Panda Yamī): An orca/giant panda-themed hybrid Yummy that possesses superhuman strength, claws on its right hand, and an orca-like left arm that Kazari created from Kiyoto Maki's desire to see his deceased sister Hitomi. The Shachi-Panda Yummy is destroyed by Kamen Riders OOO and Birth.
- Kuroageha Yummy (クロアゲハヤミー, Kuroageha Yamī): A black swallowtail-themed Yummy with aerokinesis and similar abilities as the Ageha Yummy that Uva created from Kosuke Sakata (坂田 浩介, Sakata Kōsuke)'s desire to earn money to pay back his late teacher's family. The Kuroageha Yummy is destroyed by Kamen Rider OOO. The Kuroageha Yummy is voiced by Mari Hagai (羽飼 まり, Hagai Mari) while Kosuke Sakata is portrayed by Bandō Minosuke II (二代目 坂東 巳之助, Nidaime Bandō Minosuke).
- Pteranodon Yummy (Male) (プテラノドンヤミー, Puteranodon Yamī): A series of male namesake-themed Yummy that can fly and produce fireballs, ultrasonic waves, and acidic smoke. In the non-canonical film Kamen Rider × Kamen Rider OOO & W Featuring Skull: Movie War Core, Giru creates a male Pteranodon Yummy from an unknown object before it is destroyed by Kamen Riders Accel and Birth. In the series, Maki creates two male Pteranodon Yummy from the candle he used to murder Hitomi with before they are both destroyed by Kamen Rider OOO. The male Pteranodon Yummy is voiced by Yoshimitsu Shimoyama (下山 吉光, Shimoyama Yoshimitsu) in Movie War Core and Nobutoshi Canna (神奈 延年, Kanna Nobutoshi) in the series.
  - Pteranodon Yummy (Female): A female variant of the Pteranodon Yummy with similar abilities. In Movie War Core, Giru creates a female Pteranodon Yummy from Yoshino Akechi's shoe after she breaks her leg and believes her dream of becoming a professional dancer is dashed before the Yummy is destroyed by Kamen Rider OOO. In the series, Maki creates a female Pteranodon Yummy from the candle he used to murder Hitomi with before it is destroyed by Kamen Rider OOO. The female Pteranodon Yummy is voiced by Ami Michizoe (道添 愛美, Michizoe Ami) in Movie War Core and Hiromi Tsuru (鶴 ひろみ, Tsuru Hiromi) in the series.
- Fukurou Yummy (フクロウヤミー, Fukurō Yamī): A snowy owl-themed Yummy that can fly and possesses aerokinesis and bladed feathers that Ankh (Lost) created from Eiji's high school friend Yuichi Kitamura (北村 雄一, Kitamura Yūichi)'s desire to ensure no one else can be Eiji's friend except him. The Fukurou Yummy is destroyed by Kamen Rider OOO. Yuichi Kitamura is portrayed by Takuya Nakayama (中山 卓也, Nakayama Takuya).
- Unicorn Yummy (ユニコーンヤミー, Yunikōn Yamī): A namesake-themed Yummy with the ability to remove and destroy most victims' dreams that Maki created from Shoko Sugiura (杉浦 祥子, Sugiura Shōko)'s second-place trophy, which represented her broken dream of becoming a fashion designer. After failing to destroy Eiji's dream, which was too large for it to destroy, the Unicorn Yummy is destroyed by Kamen Rider OOO. The Unicorn Yummy is voiced by Dai Matsumoto (松本 大, Matsumoto Dai) while Shoko Sugiura is portrayed by Aya Takemoto (竹本 彩, Takemoto Aya).
- Uni-Armadillo Yummy (ウニアルマジロヤミー, Uni Arumajiro Yamī): A sea urchin/armadillo-themed hybrid Yummy that possesses insomnia-inducing needles and dense armor-like skin that Mezool created from a sleepy Gamel. The Uni-Armadillo Yummy is destroyed by Kamen Rider OOO. The Uni-Armadillo Yummy is voiced by Atsushi Imaruoka (伊丸岡 篤, Imaruoka Atsushi).
- Shamo Yummy (軍鶏ヤミー, Shamo Yamī): A gamecock-themed Yummy that is adept in Muay Thai and possesses tendril-like ribbons that Ankh (Lost) created from deranged perfectionist Tomoko Shimoda (下田 智子, Shimoda Tomoko)'s desire to attack anyone she considers a bad neighbor. The Shamo Yummy is destroyed by Kamen Rider OOO. The Shamo Yummy is voiced by Toshitsugu Takashina (高階 俊嗣, Takashina Toshitsugu) while Tomoko Shimoda is portrayed by Miho Tsumiki (つみき みほ, Tsumiki Miho).
- Ankylosaurus Yummy (アンキロサウルスヤミー, Ankirosaurusu Yamī): A namesake-themed Yummy with a spike-covered body, cryokinesis, and a mace for a right hand that Maki created from an ice cube that Ankh (Lost) shattered in frustration over being incomplete. The Ankylosaurus Yummy is destroyed by Kamen Rider Birth. The Ankylosaurus Yummy is voiced by Daisuke Kirii (桐井 大介, Kirii Daisuke).
- Hagetaka Yummy (ハゲタカヤミー, Hagetaka Yamī): A vulture-themed Yummy with aerokinesis that Ankh created from Kusada (草田)'s desire to be the only male in the world. The Hagetaka Yummy is destroyed by Kamen Riders OOO and Birth. The Hagetaka Yummy is voiced by Ibuki while Kusada is portrayed by Gohshuu (剛州, Gōshū).

===== Other Yummy =====
- Nue Yummy (鵺ヤミー, Nue Yamī): An atypical namesake/baboon/leopard/anaconda-themed Yummy with fire breath and superhuman jumping that Gara created to serve him. The Nue Yummy is destroyed by Kamen Rider OOO. The Nue Yummy appears exclusively in the film Kamen Rider OOO Wonderful: The Shogun and the 21 Core Medals and is voiced by Riki Kitazawa (北沢 力, Kitazawa Riki).
- Condor Yummy (コンドルヤミー, Kondoru Yamī): A namesake-themed Yummy that Ankh created from an unnamed blind girl's desire to see. The Yummy obliged by attacking people and gouging out their eyes to give to the girl. However, she went insane from witnessing the carnage the Condor Yummy wrought and renounced her desire, causing the Yummy to disperse into Cell Medals. The Condor Yummy appears exclusively in the tie-in novel Novel: Kamen Rider OOO.
- Gokiburi Yummy (ゴキブリヤミー, Gokiburi Yamī): A cockroach-themed Yummy that Uva created from the First OOO's desire to become stronger. It quickly achieved its complete form due to the First OOO's unlimited desire, but was destroyed by him and Ankh. The Gokiburi Yummy appears exclusively in the tie-in novel Novel: Kamen Rider OOO.
- Lion Yummy (ライオンヤミー, Raion Yamī): A namesake-themed Yummy that Kazari created from the First OOO's desire to become stronger. It quickly achieved its complete form due to the First OOO's unlimited desire, but was destroyed by him and Ankh. The Lion Yummy appears exclusively in the tie-in novel Novel: Kamen Rider OOO.
- Kujira Yummy (クジラヤミー, Kujira Yamī): A whale-themed Yummy that Mezool created from the First OOO's desire to become stronger. It quickly achieved its complete form due to the First OOO's unlimited desire, but was destroyed by him and Ankh. The Kujira Yummy appears exclusively in the tie-in novel Novel: Kamen Rider OOO.

=== Kougami Foundation ===
The Kougami Foundation (鴻上ファウンデーション, Kōgami Faundēshon) is a public organization that has been researching the Greeed and the civilization that created them ever since the company acquired the sarcophagus holding them and their Core Medals, which they placed in the Kougami Art Museum's (鴻上美術館, Kōgami Bijutsukan) basement. As a result, they renamed the basement the King's Room and developed many Cell Medal-based devices and weaponry. When the Greeed reawaken and a new Kamen Rider OOO is found, the Kougami Foundation provide assistance to the latter.

==== Kousei Kougami ====
Kousei Kougami (鴻上 光生, Kōgami Kōsei) is the eccentric president of the Kougami Foundation and a descendant of the First OOO. Well versed in the history of OOO and the Core Medals, he has anticipated the Greeed's awakening and amassed several Cell Medals and artifacts related to them and OOO. Displaying an obsession for the birth of all things, good or bad, Kougami loves baking cakes, commonly birthday cakes, always has a record player in his office that usually plays "Happy Birthday", and provides items to OOO through presents. Additionally, Kougami is easily excited and becomes incredibly enthusiastic over events related to the OOO/Greeed conflict and the birth of new developments, shouting "wonderful!" (素晴らしい！, subarashii) at things that please him and "happy birthday!" whenever something new happens. In addition, he believes desires are the purest and most powerful energy source in existence and that it plays a major role in the evolution of life on Earth. This belief drives him to encourage everyone around him to succumb to their own desires and do whatever they want as long as it does not interfere with his own desires.

During the events of the crossover film Kamen Rider × Kamen Rider Fourze & OOO: Movie War Mega Max, it is revealed that Kougami began researching methods for creating new Core Medals that run on desire alone and developed the Poseidon Driver, which he gave to Michal Minato 40 years after the series.

Kousei Kougami is portrayed by Takashi Ukaji (宇梶 剛士, Ukaji Takashi).

==== Erika Satonaka ====
Erika Satonaka (里中 エリカ, Satonaka Erika) is Kougami's personal secretary and cake tester who sees things from a business-related point of view. Despite her job, she prefers spicy foods and is capable of holding her own in battle against Yummy. After Goto becomes the new Kamen Rider Birth, Satonaka becomes his partner despite being his superior, carrying her own Birth Buster and a suitcase containing additional supplies such as Cell Medals. However, she is often late to battles due to obsessing over her appearance, much to Goto's chagrin.

Erika Satonaka is portrayed by Mayuko Arisue (有末 麻祐子, Arisue Mayuko).

=== Shingo Izumi ===
Shingo Izumi (泉 信吾, Izumi Shingo) is Hina's older brother and a police detective. Following the Greeed's awakening, he is mortally wounded by the Kamakiri Yummy and subsequently possessed by Ankh, who slowly reanimates Shingo over the course of the series until Ankh and Ankh (Lost) compete to absorb each other, with Shingo experiencing everything Ankh did to his body while he was possessed. After Ankh sacrifices himself to help Eiji defeat Kiyoto Maki, a fully revived Shingo resumes his work as a police detective.

Shingo Izumi is portrayed by Ryosuke Miura, who also portrays Ankh.

=== Chiyoko Shiraishi ===
Chiyoko Shiraishi (白石 千世子, Shiraishi Chiyoko) is the owner of the International Cuisine Restaurant Cous Coussier (多国籍料理店クスクシエ, Takokuseki Ryōriten Kusukushie) who enjoys cosplaying and frequently changes her restaurant's decor to fit different cultural themes as a means to attract more customers. Despite hiring Hina, Eiji, and Goto while allowing Eiji and Ankh to live at Cous Coussier, Chiyoko remains unaware of their battles with the Greeed until Eiji's transformation into one and Ankh's near destruction convinces Hina to tell Shiraishi the truth.

Chiyoko Shiraishi is portrayed by Marie Kai (甲斐 まり恵, Kai Marie), who also portrays Hitomi Maki.

=== First OOO ===
An unnamed ancient king of a mysterious lost European civilization whose lust for power and god complex led to him becoming the First OOO (先代オーズ, Sendai Ōzu) 800 years ago. In pursuit of godhood, he commissioned his alchemists to create the Greeed and their Core Medals so he could hunt them and use their power to subjugate his enemies. Eventually, the king's avarice drove him to unite the Core Medals' power, only for them to overwhelm him and transform his body into a stone coffin that sealed four of the Greeed and Ankh's right forearm for centuries. The king's only known descendant, Kougami, attempts to finish his work in the present through Eiji.

During the events of the V-Cinema anniversary film Kamen Rider OOO 10th: Core Medal of Resurrection, the First OOO, referred to as the Ancient OOO (古代オーズ, Kodai Ōzu), (Note: In a movie booklet, the Ancient OOO is referred to as the "Ancient King Kamen Rider OOO" (古代王 仮面ライダーオーズ, Kodaiō Kamen Raidā Ōzu).) is revived alongside the Greeed in the present and plunges the world into chaos and fear. After killing Eiji, the First OOO absorbs the Greeed, but Ankh weakens him enough for the artificial Greeed, Goda, to use Eiji's body and the purple Core Medals to permanently kill the First OOO.

While the First OOO also utilizes the OOO Driver and O-Scanner to transform into Kamen Rider OOO like his successor, he possessed stronger versions of the Taka, Tora, and Batta Core Medals. Following his resurrection and absorbing the Greeed, he transforms into his Greeed-Absorbed Form (グリード吸収態, Gurīdo Kyūshūtai), which allows him to use their full powers without transforming into his different Combos.

The First OOO is voiced by Atsuki Tani (谷 昌樹, Tani Atsuki) in the V-Cinema while Shu Watanabe portrays his civilian appearance in the stage show Final Stage: Putotyra Combo.

=== Kiyoto Maki ===
Kiyoto Maki (真木 清人, Maki Kiyoto) is a deadpan, nihilistic scientist who is the overseer of the Kougami Foundation's Kougami Biotech Laboratory (鴻上生体研究所, Kōgami Seitai Kenkyūjo) and devised their Medal System. After suffering emotional abuse from his older sister and legal guardian Hitomi Maki (真木 仁美, Maki Hitomi), leading him to murder her via arson, Maki came to believe that one's true value is defined by how their life ends. However, he repressed the memory and deluded himself into believing Hitomi was a loving sister and that her death was an accident. Maki struggles with social communication, choosing instead to speak to a doll nicknamed "Kiyo-chan" (キヨちゃん) that he was given sometime prior rather than speak to someone directly. His bond with the doll is so strong that he keeps it on his shoulder or arm, and will become unable to speak properly & agitated if it is separated from his person.

Despite preferring to study the Greeed, Maki is forced to work on the Kougami Foundation's Core and Cell Medal-related projects to fund his research. His fixation with the Greeed would lead to him working with Kazari to assist in his experiments with Core Medal-based evolution. However, Kougami discovers this and threatens Maki into ending his partnership with Kazari, who retaliates by using Maki as the host for a Yummy. Maki eventually encounters Chiyoko, whom he previously developed an obsession with due to her resemblance to Hitomi. Her kindness unlocks his repressed memory and causes him to reaffirm his belief that the world should end before he steals the purple Core Medals from Kougami, destroys his laboratory, and fully aligns himself with the Greeed in the hopes of using them to end the world.

To facilitate his goal further, Maki absorbs five of the purple Core Medals to transform himself into the Kyouryu Greeed (恐竜グリード, Kyōryū Gurīdo; Dinosaur Greeed). Eventually, he kills Kazari and mortally wounds Gamel and Ankh for their Core Medals before using them on Uva to turn him into a Medal Vessel. Eiji and Ankh face him in battle, and defeat him by causing him to collapse into a black hole that engulfs all of the Core Medals.

Utilizing the purple Core Medals' power, Maki can use Cell Medals on inanimate objects that represent the end of a desire, such as broken dreams, to create dinosaur and mythical animal-themed Yummy.

Kiyoto Maki is portrayed by Yuu Kamio (神尾 佑, Kamio Yū) as an adult and Hayato Watanabe (渡辺 隼斗, Watanabe Hayato) as a child.

== Guest characters ==
- Kengo Utahoshi (歌星 賢吾, Utahoshi Kengo) and Yuki Jojima (城島 ユウキ, Jōjima Yūki): Second-year high school students and members of the Kamen Rider Club. They appear as a cameo appearance in the final episode of Kamen Rider OOO where they pass by Hina on their way to school. Kengo Utahoshi and Yuki Jojima are portrayed by Ryuki Takahashi (高橋 龍輝, Takahashi Ryūki) and Fumika Shimizu (清水 富美加, Shimizu Fumika) respectively, both ahead of their appearances in Kamen Rider Fourze.

== Spin-off exclusive characters ==
=== Nobunaga ===
Nobunaga (ノブナガ) is a Cell Medal-based homunculus created by the Kougami Foundation from the mummified remains of his conqueror namesake Oda Nobunaga who appears exclusively in the non-canonical crossover film Kamen Rider × Kamen Rider OOO & W Featuring Skull: Movie War Core. Following his creation and taking on his namesake's memories, he runs off scared and confused before transforming into a Greed-like monster called the Armored Warrior Monster (鎧武者怪人, Yoroimusha Kaijin) (Note: In promotional materials, the Armored Warrior Monster was referred to as the "Armored Warrior Greeed" (鎧武者グリード, Yoroi Musha Gurīdo).) to target the descendants of the people who arranged his namesake's death. He attacks one such individual, but is driven off by Eiji as Kamen Rider OOO and reverts to his human form. In his confused state, Nobunaga ends up in Eiji's care and learns about the modern world from him. Along the way, he encounters Akechi Mitsuhide's descendant, Yoshino Akechi, but falls in love with her. However, Nobunaga's body suffers from Cell Medal breakdown and is forced to absorb the Ebi, Kani, and Sasori Medals, which enhances his Greeed form and turns him into a mindless monster. He attacks Yoshino, but is defeated by Eiji. As he breaks down into Cell Medals, Nobunaga asks Eiji to give Yoshino a flower for him before the black Core Medals fly off and contribute to Kamen Rider Core's creation.

Nobunaga is portrayed by Kengo Ohkuchi (大口 兼悟, Ōkuchi Kengo) while the Armored Warrior Monster is voiced by Keikō Sakai (酒井 敬幸, Sakai Keikō).

=== Yoshino Akechi ===
Yoshino Akechi (明智 よしの, Akechi Yoshino) is a friend of Hina Izumi and the descendant of Akechi Mitsuhide who appears exclusively in the non-canonical crossover film Kamen Rider × Kamen Rider OOO & W Featuring Skull: Movie War Core. While pursuing her dream of becoming a professional ballet dancer, the Nobunaga homunculus falls in love with her, but she rejects his advances. After breaking her leg, Giru uses her to create a female Pteranodon Yummy, but Nobunaga uses the last of his energy to heal her.

Yoshino Akechi is portrayed by Sayako (彩也子).

=== Giru ===
Giru (ギル) (Note: Giru's name comes from the Japanese word uragiru (裏切る, "to betray").), credited as "Kyouryu Greeed", is a dinosaur-themed Greeed who appears exclusively in the non-canonical crossover film Kamen Rider × Kamen Rider OOO & W Featuring Skull: Movie War Core. He creates a male and female Pteranodon Yummy to facilitate the creation of Kamen Rider Core and the doomsday it will bring about.

Prior to the series, Giru's 10 purple Core Medals were originally in an inactive state as they were sealed in a separate location. They were eventually found and contained by the Kougami Foundation in the present due to their destructive power, but Maki steals them after severing his ties with the company. Five of the Core Medals sense Eiji's lack of desire and infect him while Kiyoto absorbs the remaining five and eventually transforms into the series' version of the Kyouryu Greeed.

Giru is voiced by Kenji Hamada (浜田 賢二, Hamada Kenji).

=== Kamen Rider Core ===
Kamen Rider Core (仮面ライダーコア, Kamen Raidā Koa) is a giant magma-based monster created from the Ebi, Kani, and Sasori Medals and the Memory Gaia Memory who appears exclusively in the non-canonical crossover film Kamen Rider × Kamen Rider OOO & W Featuring Skull: Movie War Core. He attempts to destroy the world, but is foiled and destroyed by Kamen Riders OOO and W, who shatter the Core Medals and Gaia Memory in the process.

In battle, Core is powered by Earth's inner core, can burn anything within physical contact, possesses pyrokinesis, and can turn the lower half of his body into a motorcycle.

Kamen Rider Core is voiced by Fumihiko Tachiki (立木 文彦, Tachiki Fumihiko).

=== Shocker Greeed ===
The Shocker Greeed (ショッカーグリード, Shokkā Gurīdo) is a Greeed created by the terrorist organization Shocker who appears exclusively in the anniversary film OOO, Den-O, All Riders: Let's Go Kamen Riders. In the 1970s, the organization obtained a Core Medal and modified it into the Shocker Medal, but were unable to use it in the "primary" timeline. However, Ankh's failed attempt to use Kamen Rider Den-O's DenLiner to travel through time and steal the other Greeed's Core Medals while they were sealed results in Shocker obtaining a Cell Medal that Ankh dropped and combining it with the Shocker Medal to create the Shocker Greeed, who defeats Kamen Riders 1 and 2 in the past and creates an alternate timeline where Shocker conquered the world, with 1 and 2 as their brainwashed enforcers. However, Kamen Rider New Den-O's failed attempt to undo the Shocker Greeed's creation creates a time paradox that leads to 1 and 2 being cured of their brainwashing and eventually destroying the Shocker Greeed in the altered present while the Shocker Medal fades away after the original timeline is restored.

The Shocker Greeed is voiced by Hideo Ishikawa (石川 英郎, Ishikawa Hideo).

=== Tokugawa Yoshimune ===
Tokugawa Yoshimune (徳川 吉宗) is the eighth shogun of the Tokugawa shogunate who appears exclusively in the film Kamen Rider OOO Wonderful: The Shogun and the 21 Core Medals. Due to Gara creating a time distortion that merges part of Yoshimune's version of Edo with the modern day version, Yoshimune works with Kamen Rider OOO to protect the city and later gives him the orange Core Medals, which Yoshimune received from Europe.

Tokugawa Yoshimune is portrayed by Ken Matsudaira (松平 健, Matsudaira Ken), who reprises his role from The Unfettered Shogun. Matsudaira also performs the theme song for Kamen Rider OOO Wonderful: The Shogun and the 21 Core Medals alongside Shu Watanabe (as Eiji Hino) and Ryosuke Miura (as Ankh).

=== Gara ===
Gara (ガラ) is an androgynous alchemist who was commissioned by the First OOO to create the Core Medals 800 years ago and appears exclusively in the film Kamen Rider OOO Wonderful: The Shogun and the 21 Core Medals. Gara intended to use the Core Medals to become the "True OOO" (真のオーズ, Shin no Ōzu), destroy the world, and rule over the remains as the King of the World (世界の王, Sekai no Ō). However, the First OOO killed Gara and his fellow alchemists once they completed the commission, with Gara buried in Thuringia. After Kougami unearths his tomb, Gara is revived and uses his alchemy to transfer his tower from Thuringia to Japan before capturing Kougami and Satonaka, and possessing Satsuki Wakaba (若葉 五月, Wakaba Satsuki). Believing that the world has changed little since his death, Gara takes the Core Medals back and gathers human desire to cause three time distortions in order to bring about a doomsday scenario. Despite this, Kougami tricks Gara into using Eiji, whose infinite desire overloads the machine Gara was using to execute his plans. After Eiji rescues Wakaba, Gara assumes his true Greeed-like Monster Form (怪人態, Kaijintai), only to be defeated by Kamen Riders OOO and Fourze. In response, Gara uses the Core Medals to transmute himself into the Mega Greeed-like Gara Dragon (ガラドラゴン, Gara Doragon), but is destroyed by Kamen Riders OOO and Birth.

Gara and Satsuki Wakaba are both portrayed by Miki Sakai (酒井 美紀, Sakai Miki). As the Gara-possessed Wakaba, Sakai had her voice digitally deepened and altered. In his true form, Gara is voiced by Ryūzaburō Ōtomo (大友 龍三郎, Ōtomo Ryūzaburō).

==== Bells ====
The Bells (ベル, Beru) are cell-based, Harlequin-like, triplet familiars created by Gara to serve him who appear exclusively in the film Kamen Rider OOO Wonderful: The Shogun and the 21 Core Medals

The Bells are portrayed by Karin Ogino (荻野 可鈴, Ogino Karin).

=== Michal Minato ===
Michal Minato (湊 ミハル, Minato Miharu) is a young man from the year 2050 who can transform into Kamen Rider Aqua (仮面ライダーアクア, Kamen Raidā Akua) despite ironically suffering from aquaphobia and appears exclusively in the crossover film Kamen Rider × Kamen Rider Fourze & OOO: Movie War Mega Max. While operating as Aqua, he came into contact with the black hole that Maki collapsed into where he was exposed to the Core Medals Maki absorbed and possessed by the Greeed-like entity, Kamen Rider Poseidon. Using Michal, Poseidon travels back in time to eliminate all Kamen Riders, only to separate himself from Michal, who goes on to conquer his aquaphobia and defeat Poseidon alongside Kamen Rider OOO, who reclaims the Core Medals that contributed to Poseidon's creation. Following this, Michal gives Eiji the Super Core Medals (スーパーコアメダル, Sūpā Koa Medaru) before returning to his time to protect it.

Utilizing the Manas Aqua (マナスアクア, Manasu Akua) liquid in conjunction with the Aqua Driver (アクアドライバー, Akua Doraibā) belt, Michal can transform into Kamen Rider Aqua. While transformed, he gains hydrokinesis. His personal vehicle is the Aqua Miraider (アクアミライダー, Akua Miraidā) jet ski. His finishers are the Oceanic Break (オーシャニックブレイク, Ōshanikku Bureiku) and the Aqua Vortex (アクアヴォルテクス, Akua Vorutekusu).

Michal Minato is portrayed by Atsushi Arai (荒井 敦史, Arai Atsushi).

=== Kamen Rider Poseidon ===
Kamen Rider Poseidon (仮面ライダーポセイドン, Kamen Raidā Poseidon) is a Greed-like entity formed from the Core Medals that Michal absorbed who appears exclusively in the film Kamen Rider × Kamen Rider Fourze & OOO: Movie War Mega Max. Possessing Michal, Poseidon received the means to transform into a Kamen Rider from an aged Kougami before traveling back in time to eliminate all Kamen Riders. However, the Ankh of his time followed him to the past and joined forces with Kamen Rider OOO to separate Poseidon from Michal. Poseidon attempts to travel to another time period, only to be destroyed by Kamen Riders OOO and Aqua while his Core Medals end up in Lem Kannagi's possession.

Utilizing the Same (サメ; Shark), Kujira (クジラ; Whale), and Ookamiuo (オオカミウオ, Ōkamiuo; Wolffish) Medals in conjunction with the Poseidon Driver (ポセイドンドライバー, Poseidon Doraibā) belt, Poseidon can transform into his Rider form. While transformed, he wields the Deepest Harpoon (ディーペストハープーン, Dīpesuto Hāpūn).

Kamen Rider Poseidon is voiced by Kenji Hamada (浜田 賢二, Hamada Kenji).

=== Goda ===
Goda (ゴーダ, Gōda) is an artificial Greeed created from man-made arthropod-themed Core Medals called Goda Medals (ゴーダメダル, Gōda Medaru) who appears exclusively in the V-Cinema anniversary film Kamen Rider OOO 10th: Core Medal of Resurrection. The Kougami Foundation created the Goda Medals using data on Eiji, resulting in Goda inheriting the former's personality minus his redeeming qualities. Following the real Eiji's demise and Ankh's resurrection, Goda possesses the former's body to kill the First OOO and take his power for himself as his true goal. Despite succeeding in killing the First OOO and using the Core Medals' power to gain a physical form, Goda is killed by Ankh via Eiji's body.

While using Eiji's body, Goda uses the former's Rider powers until he absorbs the Core Medals' power, which he uses to turn himself into Kamen Rider Goda (仮面ライダーゴーダ, Kamen Raidā Gōda) and separate himself from Eiji's body.

Goda is voiced by Satoshi Hino (日野 聡, Hino Satoshi).

=== World of OOO ===
The World of OOO (オーズの世界, Ōzu no Sekai) is an alternate universe that the "prime" version of Goto accidentally enters while testing the Birth Driver X and appears exclusively in the web series OOO 10th Kamen Rider Birth: Secret Story of the Birth of Birth X. In this universe, Hina and Chiyoko become Kamen Riders OOO and Birth, respectively instead of Eiji, Date, and Goto; Ankh is a scientist who fulfills Maki's role of developing Medal-based Rider systems while remaining an ally to the Riders; the primary Greeed are the Riders' allies instead of enemies, with Uva serving as Hina's partner; and Date is the CEO of the Date Foundation who becomes the Kyouryu Greeed instead of Maki.
