= Maki Mori (announcer) =

Japanese free announcer (born 1981)

- 森 麻季
- Born: 19 February 1981 (age 45); Kawaguchi, Saitama, Japan
- Other names: Morimaki (モリマキ); Mackie (マッキー, Makkī); Maki-chan (麻季ちゃん)
- Education: Aoyama Gakuin University Faculty of Economics
- Occupation: Announcer
- Years active: 2003–11 (NTV); 2013– (Ten Carat)
- Agent: Ten Carat
- Television: Current; Wake Up! Plus; Former; Zoom In!! Super; NNN News Real Time; Emperanite; The Sunday; Going! Sports & News; Kewpie 3-Bu Cooking
- Website: Official profile

Maki Mori (森 麻季, Mori Maki; born 19 February 1981) is a Japanese free announcer who is represented with Ten Carat. She is a former announcer for Nippon TV.

== Filmography ==
=== Current ===
Year	Title	Network	Ref.
2014	Wake Up! Plus	NTV	
2015	Bourbon presents Shining Star	JFN	

=== Former ===
==== When enrolling in Aoyama Gakuin University ====
Title	Network
Sunday Morning	TBS
Shūkan Sports TV	BS Fuji

==== When joining Nippon TV ====
Year	Title	Ref.
2003	Zoom In!! Super	
2004	Ax Music TV 01	
2004	Emperanite	
2004	Sports Chūkei	
2005	News Asa ichi 430	
2005	The! Jōhō Tsū	
2005	The Sunday	
2006	Soccer Earth	
2006	NNN News Spot	
2006	Pride & Spirit Nihon Pro Yakyū	
2006	Keirin Takamatsu Miya Kinen-hai Keirin Chūkei	
2007	Evening Press donna	
2007	NNN News Real Time	
2008	Ana Para	
2008	Senmon Channel: Sen-Tele go! go!	
2008	Perfume no Ki ni Naruko-chan	
2010	Going! Sports & News	
2010	Kewpie 3-Bu Cooking	
2010	news every. Saturday	
2010	2010 FIFA World Cup	
2010	Beat Takeshi Tokubetsu Shusai: Obakannu No. 1 Eizō-sai	
2010	News Zero	
2010	Fukashigi Tantei-dan	
2011	Naruhodo! Daizu Kan	
2011	Oha! 4 News Live	
	Shōten	
2012	Masahiro Nakai no Black Variety	

==== After leaving Nippon TV and before joining Ten Carat ====
Year	Title
2012	Jinsei ga Kawaru 1-funkan no Fukaīhanashi
2012	Gyōretsu no dekiru Hōritsusōdansho
2012	Kokohore! One One!

==== After joining Ten Carat ====
Year	Title	Network
2013	Dai 37-kai Zen Nihon Shōnen Soccer Taikai	NTV
2013	24-Jikan TV 36: Ai wa Chikyū o Sukuu	NTV
2013	Shinya Ueda no Going! Tokubetsuhan 2020-nen Gorin Kaisai-chi Kettei no Shunkan	NTV
2013	Mame Daifuku monogatari	
