= List of Kamen Rider W characters =

This is a character list for the 20th Kamen Rider series Kamen Rider W (仮面ライダーW, Kamen Raidā Daburu), its manga sequel Fuuto PI (風都探偵, Fūto Tantei), and the latter's anime adaptation.

== Main characters ==
The main cast of Kamen Rider W as seen in the anime adaptation of Fuuto PI. From left to right: Ryu Terui, Akiko Narumi, Philip, Shotaro Hidari, and Tokime.

=== Narumi Detective Office ===
The Narumi Detective Office (鳴海探偵事務所, Narumi Tantei Jimusho) is a private detective agency that specializes in Dopant activity and was founded by Sokichi Narumi, who was murdered while he and Shotaro were rescuing Philip and named Shotaro his successor.

==== Kamen Rider W ====
Kamen Rider W is the eponymous duo of Shotaro Hidari and Philip, who can fuse with each other and transform via the Double Driver (ダブルドライバー, Daburu Doraibā) belts and their own set of purified Gaia Memory (ガイアメモリ, Gaia Memori) USB flash drives. (Note: The term "Double Driver" comes from Bandai's packaging for the belt and official publications for the series, such as TV Asahi's official website. In the Crunchyroll subtitles for Fuuto PI, it is read as the "W Driver". This is also because the Katakana transliteration for "Double" and "W" (ダブル) are the same.) Their Double Drivers are linked, such that Philip's consciousness is transferred into Shotaro's body along with the former's Gaia Memory. As such, W's ability to function is dependent on the condition of its components, as any physical or mental disruption could affect the Kamen Rider's mobility or cancel the transformation entirely. W also possesses a modified Honda CBR1000RR motorcycle called the Hardboilder (ハードボイルダー, Hādoboirudā) and the mobile garage-like Revolgarry (リボルギャリー, Riborugyarī) truck for converting it into either the Hardturbuler (ハードタービュラー, Hādotābyurā) hovercraft or the Hardsplasher (ハードスプラッシャー, Hādosupurasshā) personal watercraft. Alternatively, the Hardboilder can assume Start Dash Mode (スタートダッシュモード, Sutāto Dasshu Mōdo) for increased speed.

W uses different combinations of two Gaia Memories to access various combinations of powers, weapons, strengths, and weaknesses through Half Change (ハーフチェンジ, Hāfu Chenji) forms, each of which possess a different Maximum Drive (マキシマムドライブ, Makishimamu Doraibu) finisher for them to destroy a Dopant's Gaia Memory through the Memory Break (メモリブレイク, Memori Bureiku) process. While they are also capable of performing a stronger Twin Maximum (ツインマキシマム, Tsuin Makishimamu) finisher via both of their active Gaia Memories, doing so proves severely harmful to the body.

- Cyclone Joker (サイクロンジョーカー, Saikuron Jōkā): W's green/black-colored default form accessed from the Cyclone and Joker Memories that allows them to throw aerial kicks. Their Maximum Drives in this form are the Joker Extreme (ジョーカーエクストリーム, Jōkā Ekustorīmu) via the Joker Memory and the Joker Spiral (ジョーカースパイラル, Jōkā Supairaru) via the Cyclone Memory. (Note: Other than the Joker Spiral, there is also another Maximum Drive via the Cyclone Memory.)
  - Cyclone Metal (サイクロンメタル, Saikuron Metaru): A green/silver-colored Half Change accessed from the Cyclone and Metal Memories that allows W to create bladed gusts. Their Maximum Drive in this form is the Metal Twister (メタルツイスター, Metaru Tsuisutā) via the Metal Memory.
  - Cyclone Trigger (サイクロントリガー, Saikuron Torigā): A green/blue-colored Half Change accessed from the Cyclone and Trigger Memories that allows W to shoot bullets of compressed air. Their Maximum Drives in this form are the Trigger Aerobuster (トリガーエアロバスター, Torigā Earobasutā) via the Cyclone Memory and the Trigger Storm Bomb (トリガーストームボム, Torigā Sutōmu Bomu) via the Trigger Memory.
- Heat Metal (ヒートメタル, Hīto Metaru): A red/silver-colored auxiliary form accessed from the Heat and Metal Memories that allows W to create flaming blades. Their Maximum Drive in this form is the Metal Branding (メタルブランディング, Metaru Burandingu) via the Metal Memory. This form first appears in the film Kamen Rider Decade: All Riders vs. Dai-Shocker.
  - Heat Joker (ヒートジョーカー, Hīto Jōkā): A red/black-colored Half Change accessed from the Heat and Joker Memories that allows W to throw flaming punches. Their Maximum Drives in this form are the Joker Grenade (ジョーカーグレネイド, Jōkā Gureneido) via the Joker Memory and the Joker Backdraft (ジョーカーバックドラフト, Jōkā Bakkudorafuto) via the Heat Memory. This form first appears in the film Kamen Rider Decade: All Riders vs. Dai-Shocker.
  - Heat Trigger (ヒートトリガー, Hīto Torigā): A red/blue-colored Half Change accessed from the Heat and Trigger Memories that allows W to shoot fireballs. Their Maximum Drive in this form is the Trigger Explosion (トリガーエクスプロージョン, Torigā Ekusupurōjon) via the Trigger Memory.
- Luna Trigger (ルナトリガー, Runa Torigā): A yellow/blue-colored auxiliary form accessed from the Luna and Trigger Memories that allows W to shoot homing projectiles. Their Maximum Drives in this form are the Trigger Full Burst (トリガーフルバースト, Torigā Furu Bāsuto) via the Trigger Memory and the Trigger Shine Field (トリガーシャインフィールド, Torigā Shain Fīrudo) via the Luna Memory.
  - Luna Joker (ルナジョーカー, Runa Jōkā): A yellow/black-colored Half Change accessed from the Luna and Joker Memories that allows W to extend their right limbs. Their Maximum Drive in this form is the Joker Strange (ジョーカーストレンジ, Jōkā Sutorenji) via the Joker Memory.
  - Luna Metal (ルナメタル, Runa Metaru): A yellow/silver-colored Half Change accessed from the Luna and Metal Memories that allows W to use the Metal Shaft as a whip. Their Maximum Drive in this form is the Metal Illusion (メタルイリュージョン, Metaru Iryūjon) via the Metal Memory.
- Fang Joker (ファングジョーカー, Fangu Jōkā): W's white/black-colored super form accessed from the Fang and Joker Memories that allows them to manifest the Arm Saber (アームセイバー, Āmu Seibā) on their right wrist, the removable Shoulder Saber (ショルダーセイバー, Shorudā Seibā) on their right shoulder, and/or the Maximum Saber (マキシマムセイバー, Makishimamu Seibā) on their right ankle. Their Maximum Drive in this form is the Fang Strizer (ファングストライザー, Fangu Sutoraizā) via the Maximum Saber. Because of Shotaro's high synchronization with the Joker Memory, it keeps the Fang Memory from entering its berserk state as the latter was initially suited for hand-to-hand combat prior to Philip's full revival in the series finale. This form first appears in the crossover film Kamen Rider × Kamen Rider W & Decade: Movie War 2010.
  - Fang Trigger (ファングトリガー, Fangu Torigā): A white/blue-colored Half Change accessed from the Fang and Trigger Memories that allows W to manifest a pair of Arm Sabers on their left wrist, which serve as a bow that allows them to fire energy arrows, and/or a tiger claw from their right metacarpus, which allows them to fire paralyzing Fist Needle (フィストニードル, Fisuto Nīdoru) projectiles. Their Maximum Drive in this form is the Fang Screwdle (ファングスクリュードル, Fangu Sukuryūdoru). This form appears exclusively in the manga/anime sequel Fuuto PI.
  - Fang Metal (ファングメタル, Fangu Metaru): A white/silver-colored Half Change accessed from the Fang and Metal Memories that allows W to manifest a series of Shoulder Sabers on both sides of their forearms, upper arms, and shoulders. Their Maximum Drive in this form is the Fang Spear Bullet (ファングスピアバレット, Fangu Supia Baretto). This form appears exclusively in the manga/anime sequel Fuuto PI.

W also uses Memory Gadgets (メモリガジェット, Memori Gajetto), items powered by artificial Gaia Memories called Pseudo Memories (ギジメモリ, Giji Memori) that can be reconfigured from their device-like Gadget Mode (ガジェットモード, Gajetto Mōdo) to their animal-like Live Mode (ライブモード, Raibu Mōdo) and strengthen W's weapons with the use of a Soul Memory.

- Stag Phone (スタッグフォン, Sutaggu Fon): A pair of cellphones that can switch between Cellphone Mode (携帯モード, Keitai Mōdo) and Stag Mode (スタッグモード, Sutaggu Mōdo) via the Stag (スタッグ, Sutaggu) Memory. W normally uses a Stag Phone to summon and control the Hardboilder and/or the Revolgarry, but they can also attach it onto either the Trigger Magnum to perform the Trigger Stag Burst (トリガースタッグバースト, Torigā Sutaggu Bāsuto) Maximum Drive via the Trigger Memory or the Metal Shaft to perform the Metal Stag Breaker (メタルスタッグブレイカー, Metaru Sutaggu Bureikā) Maximum Drive via the Metal Memory. Using the Heat Memory, the Stag Phone can perform a Maximum Drive that engulfs it in flames to attack targets.
- Spider Shock (スパイダーショック, Supaidā Shokku): A wristwatch that can switch between Wristwatch Mode (腕時計モード, Udedokei Mōdo) and Spider Mode (スパイダーモード, Supaidā Mōdo) via the Spider (スパイダー, Supaidā) Memory. It has a grappling hook in Wristwatch Mode and can shoot trackers. When attached to the Trigger Magnum, it allows W to fire a net to capture Dopants. When attached to the Metal Shaft, it allows W to shoot webbed string to restrain Dopants. During the events of the manga sequel Fuuto PI, the Neo Spider (ネオ・スパイダー, Neo Supaidā) Memory is created.
- Bat Shot (バットショット, Batto Shotto): A digital camera that can switch between Digicam Mode (デジカメモード, Dejikame Mōdo) and Bat Mode (バットモード, Batto Mōdo) via the Bat (バット, Batto) Memory. A live video feed can be linked to the Stag Phone while in Bat Mode and its flash can disorient others. When attached to the Metal Shaft—a combination Shotaro dubs the Sonic Shaft (ソニックシャフト, Sonikku Shafuto)—it can emit sonic waves strong enough to shatter solid objects. When attached to the Trigger Magnum, it allows W to perform the Trigger Bat Shooting (トリガーバットシューティング, Torigā Batto Shūtingu) Maximum Drive via the Trigger Memory. Using the Luna Memory, the Bat Shot can perform a Maximum Drive that reveals and stuns any hidden targets in its vicinity.
- Frog Pod (フロッグポッド, Furoggu Poddo): A speaker that can switch between Speaker Mode (スピーカーモード, Supīkā Mōdo) and Frog Mode (フロッグモード, Furoggu Mōdo) via the Frog (フロッグ, Furoggu) Memory. W primarily uses it for audio recording and analysis via its sound recorder, though it also contains a voice modulator.
- Denden Sensor (デンデンセンサー, Denden Sensā): A pair of night vision goggles that can switch between Goggle Mode (ゴーグルモード, Gōguru Mōdo) (Note: Also translated as "Night Scope Mode".) and Denden Mode (デンデンモード, Denden Mōdo) via the Denden (デンデン; Snail) Memory. Its primary ability is to detect changes in the light spectra and alert its user to targets invisible to the naked eye. It is also used as a surveillance device, being able to store eight terabytes of information in its Pseudo Memory.

The Xtreme (エクストリーム, Ekustorīmu) Memory is a bird-like Gaia Memory that can be reconfigured from Live Mode to Memory Mode (メモリモード, Memori Mōdo) for W to assume their final form; Cyclone Joker Xtreme (サイクロンジョーカーエクストリーム, Saikuron Jōkā Ekusutorīmu). Being an evolved form of Cyclone Joker, the Xtreme Memory contains a digitized Philip that fully integrates him and Shotaro into a single being for the duration of this form, which grants full access to the True Gaia Memory via the iridescent Crystal Server (クリスタルサーバー, Kurisutaru Sābā) band. Additionally, they wield the two-in-one Prism Bicker (プリズムビッカー, Purizumu Bikkā), which can separate into the Prism Sword (プリズムソード, Purizumu Sōdo) for utilizing the Prism (プリズム, Purizumu) Memory to neutralize most Dopants' regenerative abilities and the Bicker Shield (ビッカーシールド, Bikkā Shīrudo) for linking the power of four Maximum Drives into one. W's Maximum Drives in this form are the W (Prism) Xtreme (ダブル (プリズム) エクストリーム, Daburu (Purizumu) Ekusutorīmu) via the Xtreme Memory, the Prism Break (プリズムブレイク, Purizumu Bureiku) via the Prism Sword, and the Bicker Charge Break (ビッカーチャージブレイク, Bikkā Chāji Bureiku) and Bicker Finallusion (ビッカーファイナリュージョン, Bikkā Fainaryūjon) via the Prism Bicker.

- Cyclone Joker Gold Xtreme (サイクロンジョーカーゴールドエクストリーム, Saikuron Jōkā Gōrudo Ekusutorīmu): The evolved form of Cyclone Joker Xtreme achieved when exposed to strong winds that grants a set of insect wings. W's Maximum Drive in this form is the Golden Xtreme (ゴールデンエクストリーム, Gōruden Ekusutorīmu). This form appears exclusively in the film Kamen Rider W Forever: A to Z/The Gaia Memories of Fate and the crossover films Kamen Rider × Kamen Rider OOO & W Featuring Skull: Movie War Core and Kamen Rider × Kamen Rider Wizard & Fourze: Movie War Ultimatum.

===== Shotaro Hidari =====
Shotaro Hidari (左 翔太郎, Hidari Shōtarō) is the man of the streets. A self-proclaimed "hard-boiled private eye" who emulates famous pulp fiction private eye characters, dresses himself in 1940s fashion, and possesses a sharp intuition that allows him to deduce the culprit behind a crime before having Philip provide evidence to confirm his suspicions. Vowing to ensure that no one ever feels sad, Shotaro became a protégé of Fuuto's private investigator Sokichi Narumi after crossing paths with him and admiring his work as a child. Unlike his mentor, Shotaro was initially incapable of making tough decisions due to his kindhearted nature making him seek to talk down potentially misguided, redeemable criminals and those in tough straights first; which leads to others viewing him as "half-boiled". Nonetheless, he never abandons anyone in need and adheres to his beliefs.

Following Sokichi's death and meeting Philip during the "Begins Night" (ビギンズナイト, Biginzu Naito) incident, Shotaro vows to continue in his mentor's stead while becoming a man "suitable" to wear Sokichi's white fedora; which he considers the symbol of him achieving the mantle and legacy his mentor left for him per Sokichi's last words to him. As such, Shotaro works to stop the Dopant crime wave in Fuuto by providing his body to Kamen Rider W, taking pride in the role and being called a "Kamen Rider" by the citizens due to the title's meaning of a man who rebels against those who would make the world go wrong. While Shotaro was not originally intended to be partnered with Philip due to his body not bearing the special physiological properties that would make him most ideal to bear the burden of W's powers or resist extranormal Dopant powers possessed by the Museum and Foundation X's executives, Shotaro adapted to the situation through the strength of his resolves, eventually surpassing his physical limitations to unleash W's full abilities and earning the right to wear Sokichi's fedora.

As W, Shotaro possesses Gaia Memories with gold-colored connectors called Body Memories (ボディメモリ, Bodi Memori), which form the left half of W's body and determine the fighting style in conjunction with Philip's Soul Memories. They are also used in W's Maximum Drives.

- Joker (ジョーカー, Jōkā): Grants superhuman agility. If necessary, Shotaro can utilize the Joker Memory in conjunction with a Lost Driver to transform into Kamen Rider Joker (仮面ライダージョーカー, Kamen Raidā Jōkā), whose Maximum Drives are the Rider Kick (ライダーキック, Raidā Kikku) and the Rider Punch (ライダーパンチ, Raidā Panchi), whenever Philip is unavailable. Kamen Rider Joker first appears in the film Kamen Rider W Forever: A to Z/The Gaia Memories of Fate.
- Metal (メタル, Metaru): Grants superhuman strength. In any form using the Metal Memory, W wields the extendable Metal Shaft (メタルシャフト, Metaru Shafuto) bō.
- Trigger (トリガー, Torigā): Grants superhuman senses. In any form using the Trigger Memory, W wields the Trigger Magnum (トリガーマグナム, Torigā Magunamu) handgun, which can be reconfigured from Normal Mode (ノーマルモード, Nōmaru Mōdo) to Maximum Mode (マキシマムモード, Makishimamu Mōdo) when performing its Maximum Drives.

Shotaro Hidari is portrayed by Renn Kiriyama in Kamen Rider W and voiced by Yoshimasa Hosoya in Memory of Heroez and Fuuto PI. As a child, Shotaro is portrayed by Issei Kakazu in Kamen Rider W and voiced by Ayumu Murase in Fuuto PI: Kamen Rider Skull no Shōzō.

===== Philip =====
The mysterious Philip (フィリップ, Firippu) is Shotaro's partner in the detective agency who lost his memory, has a tendency for obsessively focusing on a specific topic of interest, and uses his special abilities to access the Gaia Library to solve Dopant crimes. He was originally Raito Sonozaki (園咲 来人, Sonozaki Raito), the youngest child and only son of the Sonozaki family who died after falling into the Earth's consciousness, also known as the True Gaia Memory (真のガイアメモリ, Shin no Gaia Memori), and revived as an ageless data human. As a result, his father Ryubee considered Raito the "Child of Fate" (運命の子, Unmei no Ko) and had his son's memory erased in order to use him to mass-produce artificial Gaia Memories for the Museum. After being rescued by Shotaro and Sokichi, the latter of whom named Raito after the fictional detective Philip Marlowe, Philip aids Shotaro to atone for willingly aiding his family by remaining in the Narumi Detective Office's secret hangar and investigate Dopant activities through his ability to access the Gaia Library (地球(ほし)の本棚, Hoshi no Hondana) and its Infinite Archive (無限アーカイブ, Mugen Ākaibu), a metaphysical realm and Akashic records in the form of a white room filled with an endless number of books on an endless number of bookshelves.

Initially a logic-driven sociopath with little common sense who constantly irks all around him, Philip gradually becomes more empathic while slowly learning of his former identity. He is eventually captured and absorbed by his sister Wakana to restore the Museum's hold on the True Gaia Memory. While he is later extracted by Shotaro, this event causes Philip's body to destabilize to the point where he risks breaking up into data and being absorbed by the Earth if he transforms into W again and cancels the transformation. Saving this final transformation to save Wakana and fight Jun Kazu, Philip has Shotaro promise to continue fighting for Fuuto after he is gone and leaves the Lost Driver to Shotaro as a parting gift.

However, after Wakana learns Philip sacrificed his own physical existence to save her, she sacrifices herself in turn to bring back the Xtreme Memory and reconstruct Philip's physical body. Before returning, Philip shares one last moment with his family, who tell him that they will be watching over him. Upon revealing himself a year later, Philip resumes protecting Fuuto with Shotaro.

As W, Philip possesses Gaia Memories with silver-colored connectors called Soul Memories (ソウルメモリ, Souru Memori), which transfer his consciousness into Shotaro's body and provides the right half of W's body and elemental powers.

- Cyclone (サイクロン, Saikuron): Grants aerokinesis. In any form using the Cyclone Memory, W wears the Windy Stabilizer (ウィンディスタビライザー, Windi Sutabiraizā) scarf. During the events of the novel Novel: Kamen Rider W: The One Who Continues After Z, Philip utilizes the Cyclone Memory in conjunction with the Lost Driver to transform into Kamen Rider Cyclone (仮面ライダーサイクロン, Kamen Raidā Saikuron).
- Heat (ヒート, Hīto): Grants pyrokinesis.
- Luna (ルナ, Runa): Grants the ability to cast illusions.
- Fang (ファング, Fangu): A Dromaeosaurid-like Gaia Memory built to protect Philip and act on his orders. It can also be reconfigured from Live Mode to Memory Mode. When Philip uses the Fang Memory, he becomes the main body while Shotaro's consciousness is transferred to him, allowing the former to go out into the field and utilize W's power in case the latter is physically unable to. Originally, the forms resultant from this Gaia Memory is treated as a last resort as the transformation is extremely taxing on Philip's frail body and renders him a berserker, locking the pair to the use of the Fang Joker combination, until Philip is fully revived in the series finale; whereafter combinations with the Metal and Trigger Memories were shown to finally be usable. In any form using the Fang Memory, W gains the ability to manifest Saber (セイバー, Seibā) blades on their body. Unlike W's normal Half Changes, the Fang-based Half Changes cannot use their left half's Gaia Memory-based weapons.

Philip is portrayed by Masaki Suda in Kamen Rider W and voiced by Koki Uchiyama in Memory of Heroez and Fuuto PI. As a child, Philip is portrayed by Tomoya Hashimoto.

==== Akiko Narumi ====
Akiko Narumi (鳴海 亜樹子, Narumi Akiko), later Akiko Terui (照井 亜樹子, Terui Akiko), is Shotaro's "boss" and hereditary head of the Narumi Detective Office with a black and white view of the world. Because of her young appearance and attitude, Shotaro refers to her as "Middle School Girl" (女子中学生, Joshi Chūgakusei) and sees her as a threat to the agency's viability and reputation. She came to Fuuto from Osaka to find her father Sokichi and reclaim the agency's building, initially unaware that her father had died and was a Kamen Rider until the events of the crossover film Kamen Rider × Kamen Rider W & Decade: Movie War 2010. In addition to (technically) being the boss, she serves as a personal assistant while on the job in an attempt to learn the profession, only for her to frequently endanger herself and clients due to her incompetence, inexperience, and childish personality. Moreover, Akiko develops a relationship with Ryu Terui over the course of the series and spin-off media, which eventually culminates in them getting married, and having a daughter named Haruna Terui (照井 春奈, Terui Haruna) as revealed during the events of Drive Saga: Kamen Rider Chaser.

Akiko Narumi is portrayed by Hikaru Yamamoto in Kamen Rider W, a role she would reprise in the Kamen Rider Girls Remix net-specials; and voiced by Mikako Komatsu in Fuuto PI. As a child, Akiko is portrayed by Saho Ueda.

=== Ryu Terui ===
Ryu Terui (照井 竜, Terui Ryū) is the superintendent appointed to the Fuuto PD's Paranormal Crime Division (超常犯罪捜査課, Chōjō Hanzai Sōsaka), much to the chagrin of Shotaro, Jinno, and Makura. Though he becomes an ally to Shotaro in fighting Dopant crimes as the red-colored Kamen Rider Accel (仮面ライダーアクセル, Kamen Raidā Akuseru), Terui originally became a Kamen Rider to find his family's murderer, Dr. Shinkuro Isaka. However, it is only after Isaka's death that Terui learns that there is more to the story behind the death of his family. Additionally, Terui comes to develop feelings for Akiko over the course of the series and eventually goes on to marry her during the crossover film Kamen Rider × Kamen Rider OOO & W Featuring Skull: Movie War Core and have a daughter named Haruna Terui with her in between the events of Fuuto PI and the Kamen Rider Drive V-Cinema Drive Saga: Kamen Rider Chaser.

Utilizing the Accel (アクセル, Akuseru) Memory in conjunction with the Accel Driver (アクセルドライバー, Akuseru Doraibā) belt, Terui can transform into Kamen Rider Accel. While transformed, he wields the Engine Blade (エンジンブレード, Enjin Burēdo) sword, which he can use in conjunction with either the Accel Memory to perform the A-Slasher (エースラッシャー, Ē Surasshā) and Dynamic Ace (ダイナミックエース, Dainamikku Ēsu) Maximum Drives or the artificial Engine (エンジン, Enjin) Memory to gain Steam (スチーム, Suchīmu), Jet (ジェット, Jetto), and Electric (エレクトリック, Erekutorikku) abilities. His Maximum Drive is the Accel Glanzer (アクセルグランツァー, Akuseru Gurantsā), which can combine with Kamen Rider W Fang Joker's Fang Strizer to perform the Rider Twin Maximum (ライダーツインマキシマム, Raidā Tsuin Makishimamu).

Similarly to W, Terui possesses the Beetle Phone (ビートルフォン, Bītoru Fon) Memory Gadget, which can switch between Cellphone Mode and Beetle Mode (ビートルモード, Bītoru Mōdo) via the Beetle (ビートル, Bītoru) Memory, and the tank-like Gunner A (ガンナーA, Gan'nā Ē) support robot, which operates on its own via its onboard A.I. and can combine with W's Hardboilder to form the Hardgunner (ハードガンナー, Hādogan'nā) half-track. When attached to W's Trigger Magnum, the Beetle Phone allows them to perform the Trigger Beetle Blaster (トリガービートルブラスター, Torigā Bītoru Burasutā) Maximum Drive via the Trigger Memory.

- Bike Form (バイクフォーム, Baiku Fōmu): An auxiliary form accessed by detaching the Accel Driver's belt buckle that grants the ability to transform into a motorcycle-like state. In this form, Terui can combine with either the Gunner A or any one of the Revolgarry's units. His Maximum Drive in this form is the Bike Engine Dasher (バイクエンジンダッシャー, Baiku Enjin Dasshā) via the Engine Memory.
  - Accelgunner (アクセルガンナー, Akuserugannā): An enhanced version of Bike Form that combines with the Gunner A to gain the use of the Gaia Cannon (ガイアキャノン, Gaia Kyanon) and the Gatling Wheel (ガトリングホイール, Gatoringu Hoīru) machine gun. Terui's Maximum Drive in this form is the Gunner Full Break (ガンナーフルブレイク, Gannā Furu Bureiku) via the Gaia Cannon.
  - Accelturbuler (アクセルタービュラー, Akuserutābyurā): An enhanced version of Bike Form that combines with the Revolgarry's Turbuler (タービュラー, Tābyurā) unit to gain the use of the Scramble Cutter (スクランブルカッター, Sukuranburu Kattā) cannons. Terui's Maximum Drive in this form is the Accelturbler Phoenix (アクセルタービュラーフェニックス, Akuserutāburā Fenikkusu) via the Engine Blade.

Additionally, Terui can transform into the following variations of his Rider form:

- Kamen Rider Accel Trial (仮面ライダーアクセルトライアル, Kamen Raidā Akuseru Toraiaru): Terui's blue-colored final form accessed from the stopwatch-like Trial (トライアル, Toraiaru) Memory that grants superhuman speed. His Maximum Drives in this form are the Machine Gun Spike (マシンガンスパイク, Mashin Gan Supaiku) on his own and the Machine Gun Slasher (マシンガンスラッシャー, Mashin Gan Surasshā) via the Engine Blade.
- Kamen Rider Accel Booster (仮面ライダーアクセルブースター, Kamen Raidā Akuseru Būsutā): A yellow-colored special form accessed from the Accel Memory combined with the Gaia Memory Enhancing Adapter (ガイアメモリ強化アダプター, Gaia Memori Kyōka Adaputā) that grants flight capabilities. Terui's Maximum Drive in this form is the Booster Slasher (ブースタースラシャー, Būsutā Surasshā) via the Engine Blade. This form appears exclusively in the V-Cinema sequel special Kamen Rider W Returns: Kamen Rider Accel and the crossover film Kamen Rider × Kamen Rider Wizard & Fourze: Movie War Ultimatum.

Ryu Terui is portrayed by Minehiro Kinomoto in Kamen Rider W and voiced by Makoto Furukawa in Memory of Heroez and Fuuto PI.

=== Tokime ===
Tokime (ときめ), full name Tokime Bando (万灯 時女, Bandō Tokime), is a mysterious, pink-haired amnesiac girl, thief, Yukiji Bando's twin elder sister, and the Joker Dopant (ジョーカー・ドーパント, Jōkā Dōpanto) who possesses supernatural powers, believing herself to be a witch as a result, and appears exclusively in the manga sequel Fuuto PI and its subsequent anime adaptation. She was born and raised alongside Bando and Towa in a foreign experiment facility, which conducted living-body experiments to create babies with great genes to create special soldiers, until Foundation X took them and gave them their current family registers. Due to her fierce battle with the Aurora Dopant over Towa, she got amnesia, but at the same time achieved High Dope. Initially a suspect for a brutal killing spree before she is proven innocent and a target of the Street crime syndicate, she comes to work for the Narumi Detective Office as an assistant and gradually recovers her memories as a Street assassin codenamed "Witch" before leaving the detective office after regaining access to her Dopant form.

Utilizing the Joker Memory in conjunction with a Gaia Driver Rex, Tokime can transform into the Joker Dopant. While transformed, she can cover herself in a bio-energy aura for protection, solidify it into cards for offensive and defensive purposes, and trap targets inside human-sized cards. After achieving High Dope, she gained the ability to sense the power of Gaia Memory and dimensional portal.

Tokime is voiced by Akira Sekine.

== Recurring characters ==
=== Sokichi Narumi ===
Sokichi Narumi (鳴海 荘吉, Narumi Sōkichi) was Shotaro's mentor, Akiko's father, and founder of the Narumi Detective Office, affectionately referred to by Shotaro as "old man" (おやっさん, Oyassan). Sokichi's policy with investigations was to ensure the client's safety above all else, and unlike Shotaro, he was truly hardboiled in the sense that he could make difficult decisions when he needed to and follow through on them with a stern attitude. During flashbacks depicted in the crossover film Kamen Rider × Kamen Rider OOO & W Featuring Skull: Movie War Core, Sokichi became involved in Dopant cases and gained the means to become Kamen Rider Skull (仮面ライダースカル, Kamen Raidā Sukaru) from Shroud, an old friend of his. It was during his first case after becoming a Kamen Rider that Sokichi was infested with one of the Spider Dopant's bombs, which forced him to never see his daughter again, as touching her would detonate the bomb and kill her. Sokichi later accepted a job from Shroud to rescue Philip from the Sonozaki family. During this mission, Sokichi lost his Rider equipment while fighting the Taboo Dopant and sacrificed his Skull Memory to free Philip. Sokichi gave Philip his new name after his favorite detective novel series, convincing the boy to come with him to decide his own fate and find his own atonement. While attempting to escape, Sokichi was killed by the Sonozaki family's hired men and dies giving Shotaro his white fedora, telling him to become a man worthy of wearing it. Later, during the events of the film Kamen Rider W Forever: A to Z/The Gaia Memories of Fate, Sokichi's ghost seemingly visits Shotaro, leaving behind his Lost Driver (ロストドライバー, Rosuto Doraibā) belt that allows Shotaro to transform into Kamen Rider Joker.

Utilizing the Skull (スカル, Sukaru) Memory in conjunction with the Lost Driver, Sokichi could transform into Kamen Rider Skull. While transformed, he wielded a prototype of the Trigger Magnum called the Skull Magnum (スカルマグナム, Sukaru Magunamu), which he could use in conjunction with the Skull Memory to perform the Skull Punisher (スカルパニッシャー, Sukaru Panisshā) Maximum Drive. His Maximum Drive was the Rider Kick. Because of his prototypical nature, Skull's Maximum Drives kill the Dopant rather than simply break their Gaia Memory. His personal vehicles were the Skullboilder (スカルボイルダー, Sukaruboirudā) motorcycle and the Skullgarry (スカルギャリー, Sukarugyarī) high-speed armored transport vehicle, which were expanded and refurbished into the Hardboilder and Revolgarry respectively.

During the events of Kamen Rider × Kamen Rider OOO & W Featuring Skull: Movie War Core, it is revealed that when he first received his Rider powers, Sokichi initially transformed into the incomplete Kamen Rider Skull Crystal (仮面ライダークリスタルスカル, Kamen Raidā Sukaru Kurisutaru). While transformed, he gained the ability to generate energy skulls.

During the events of the anime film Fuuto PI: Kamen Rider Skull no Shōzō, it is revealed that Sokichi would become undead while transformed, which effectively made him immortal and unable to feel pain. Bando speculates that Shroud originally intended for him to partner with Philip and become the green/black-colored Kamen Rider W Cyclone Skull (サイクロンスカル, Saikuron Sukaru).

Sokichi Narumi is portrayed by Koji Kikkawa, who also performs the song "Nobody's Perfect", in Kamen Rider W and voiced by Kenjiro Tsuda in Fuuto PI: Kamen Rider Skull no Shōzō.

=== Dopants ===
The Dopants (ドーパント, Dōpanto) (Note: The Dopants' name is derived from the term doping and the alternative name for doping agents.) are humans who received Gaia Memories from the Museum. Originally, the Memories were created using Philip's link to the True Gaia Memory by means of the Gaia Library. After Philip was taken however, the Museum resorts to using a shrine located under the Sonozaki manor to create Gaia Memories. From there, the Museum sells them to the highest bidder or to common criminals in order to use them as guinea pigs to study the Gaia Memories as part of the Gaia Impact project. Despite the Museum being disbanded following Ryubee's death, some Gaia Memories fell into the hands of other groups.

The Museum's Gaia Memory dealers employ Living Connector Setting Operation Guns (生体コネクタ設置手術器, Seitai Konekuta Setchi Shujutsuki), or Connect Shooters (コネクトシューター, Konekuto Shūtā), to implant USB-port-like Living Connectors (生体コネクタ, Seitai Konekuta) onto humans' bodies so they can use their Gaia Memories to transform into Dopants. While a human can possess multiple Living Connectors, the resulting Gaia Memory abuse will result in the user's death if their original Gaia Memory is destroyed. Moreover, a human can use Gaia Memories without Living Connectors to transform, though it will result in debilitating side effects.

In the manga sequel Fuuto PI, Gaia Memory users have the potential to reach a level of power called High Dope (ハイドープ, Hai Dōpu) through repeated use of a Gaia Memory that they show a high degree of compatibility with. Upon reaching High Dope, users gain various powers beyond the limits of their Gaia Memories, such as enhancing their Dopant forms and being able to utilize superhuman or psychic powers without transforming into a Dopant.

==== Sonozaki family ====
The Sonozaki family (園咲家, Sonozaki-ke) is an aristocratic family based in Fuuto who founded the Museum (ミュージアム, Myūjiamu) crime syndicate. When his son Raito died and was reborn as an avatar of the True Gaia Memory, Ryubee used the Museum to produce and distribute the Gaia Memories that Raito created throughout the criminal underworld for experimentation, resulting in the Dopant crime waves. The Museum's ultimate goal is to use the data gathered from the Dopants and Kamen Riders to invoke the Gaia Impact (ガイアインパクト, Gaia Inpakuto), which Ryubee plans to make mankind one with the Earth itself due to his fears of humanity's extinction.

With the exception of Raito and Fumine, each member of the Sonozaki family owns a special Gaia Memory called a Gold Memory (ゴールドメモリ, Gōrudo Memori), which allows them to assume Dopant forms in conjunction with a prototype Gaia Driver (ガイアドライバー, Gaia Doraibā) belt, which negates the corrupting effects of usual Dopant Gaia Memories at the cost of reduced power. While Ryubee's plan almost succeeds, it results in the family estate burning to the ground, marking the end of both its patriarch and the Museum. In the series finale, Wakana sacrifices herself to revive Raito while the rest of the Sonozaki family become part of the Earth to watch over him, tasking him with the family duty of protecting Fuuto and changing the world for the benefit of mankind.

===== Ryubee Sonozaki =====
Ryubee Sonozaki (園咲 琉兵衛, Sonozaki Ryūbee) is a former archaeologist, the seemingly wise and jovial yet maniacal head of the Sonozaki family, the "godfather" of the Museum syndicate, and curator of the Fuuto Museum who sees Fuuto as his personal kingdom. He sports a commanding presence and can adequately terrify many even without the use of his Terror (テラー, Terā) Memory, which is the main reason why the police leave him alone despite having their suspicions regarding his activities. Due to his obsession with Fuuto and the Museum's machinations, Ryubee refuses to let anyone, including his family nor the deaths of Gaia Memory users, get in the way of his goals.

During his time as an archaeologist, Ryubee found fossil deposits and relics underneath the land his estate would later be built over, bought the grounds, and added the artifacts to the Fuuto Museum's collection. He also eventually discovered the planet's consciousness, later dubbed the Gaia Memory (地球の記憶, Chikyū no Kioku), and brought his family to see it. However, his son Raito died falling into it and was resurrected by the planet's powers. Following this, Ryubee began making preparations for his Gaia Impact to ensure humanity's continued survival by fusing them with the planet itself like Raito had been. Despite Raito being taken by the Narumi Detective Office and Kamen Riders W and Accel threatening his plans, Ryubee uses them to collect more data and improve the Gaia Impact as well as remains confident that he will find Raito again.

To reach his goal, he uses an archaeologist's brush dubbed the "Evil Tail" (イーヴィルテイル, Īviru Teiru), which is inscribed with his family members' names, to overcome the fear that would go along with sacrificing them for the Gaia Impact, though it eventually causes him to go mad. After recovering and sacrificing Raito to the Gaia Memory once more to fuse his daughter Wakana with the Earth, Ryubee is confronted by W and Accel, who join forces to defeat him, rescue Raito, and destroy his Terror Memory, along with most of the Sonozaki estate. Due to his mind having been broken over the years, Ryubee dances in the burning ruins of his house, ecstatic that he succeeded in initiating his Gaia Impact before subsequently dying in the blaze while recalling the good times he had with his family and holding no regrets about his life.

Utilizing the Terror Memory in conjunction with a Gaia Driver, Ryubee can transform into the Terror Dopant (テラー・ドーパント, Terā Dōpanto). While transformed, he can increase victims' fear to maddening levels, summon the Terror Field (テラーフィールド, Terā Fīrudo) to either burn his victims or teleport himself and others across long distances, and project his power into the Terror Crown (テラークラウン, Terā Kuraun) to create a Barong-like familiar called the Terror Dragon (テラードラゴン, Terā Doragon).

Ryubee Sonozaki is portrayed by Minori Terada in Kamen Rider W and voiced by Katsuhisa Hōki in Memory of Heroez and Fuuto PI: Kamen Rider Skull no Shōzō.

===== Saeko Sonozaki =====
Saeko Sonozaki (園咲 冴子, Sonozaki Saeko) is the eldest child of the Sonozaki family who runs an IT company called the Digal Corporation (ディガル・コーポレーション, Digaru Kōporēshon), which serves as a front for Gaia Memory production and distribution. Ryubee strictly raised Saeko to believe that their family is superior to all others and that they are destined to rule the world. This loveless upbringing caused her to grow up secretly hating her father, often taking the resulting rage out on her younger sister Wakana, and serves as fuel for her desire to take over the Museum to prove herself as its ideal successor. Saeko also has a tendency to kill her boyfriends if they do not live up to her expectations. When she spares Kirihiko due to his capabilities, she marries him and lets him live until he threatens the Museum's livelihood, having never truly loved him in the first place.

Following this, Saeko begins to visit Shinkuro Isaka to improve her Dopant form and focus on her plans for the Museum, growing to care for him in the process. When her coup against Ryubee fails and Isaka is killed, Saeko goes on the run, only to be hunted down by the Smilodon Dopant, who takes her Taboo (タブー, Tabū) Memory and leaves her for dead. However, Saeko is saved by Jun Kazu, who offers his support in her scheme to take control of the Museum.

Discarding her Gaia Driver, she obtains the Nasca Memory and uses an L.C.O.G. on herself to become the Nasca Dopant's Level 3 state, also known as the R Nasca Dopant (Rナスカ・ドーパント, Āru Nasuka Dōpanto), (Note: The "R" stands for "Red" and "Revenge".) so she can defeat Wakana. However, Wakana evolves into Claydoll Xtreme and overpowers Saeko, forcing her to find other methods for acquiring power until the Nasca Memory is destroyed during another confrontation with Wakana. Following Ryubee's death and the Sonozaki manor's destruction, a disillusioned Saeko learns Wakana was taken by Foundation X and regains the Taboo Memory from Kazu, who names Saeko the new head of the Museum. No longer needing to prove herself superior to her father, Saeko fights Kazu to save Wakana, sacrificing herself in the process.

Utilizing the Taboo Memory in conjunction with a Gaia Driver, Saeko can transform into the Taboo Dopant (タブー・ドーパント, Tabū Dōpanto). While transformed, she gains flight capabilities and the ability to generate deadly plasma balls. As the R Nasca Dopant, she possesses similar abilities as the original Nasca Dopant, though her strength and speed are much stronger. The appearance and abilities of the Taboo Dopant can vary depending on the user's inner nature, and in the manga sequel Fuuto PI, twelve Foundation X agents transform into Taboo Dopants with various appearances.

Saeko Sonozaki is portrayed by Ami Namai in Kamen Rider W and voiced by Satomi Satō in Memory of Heroez and Fuuto PI: Kamen Rider Skull no Shōzō.

===== Wakana Sonozaki =====
Wakana Sonozaki (園咲 若菜, Sonozaki Wakana) is the middle child and youngest daughter of the Sonozaki family who, since her brother's death and disappearance, has been secretly raised to become the key element in Ryubee's plans. Working as a DJ at the local Wind Wave (ウインドウェーブ, Uindo Wēbu) radio station, she hosts the Wakana's Healing Princess (園咲若菜のヒーリングプリンセス, Sonozaki Wakana no Hīringu Purinsesu) show and gained a loyal fan base as a result. While she puts up a shy and kind persona on the show or whenever a crowd is around, her true personality is the complete opposite. Out of all of the members of the Sonozaki family, she is the least involved with the Gaia Memory business as she was doted upon while growing up. After encountering Philip, Wakana begins to have second thoughts about being a Dopant and discards her Claydoll (クレイドール, Kureidōru) Memory. However, Ryubee returns it to her and eventually brings her into the family business by using her as a guinea pig for testing the Xtreme Memory's effects on the True Gaia Memory.

After trying to run away with Philip, Ryubee takes Wakana to the Museum's true base of operations and convinces her that she is serving a greater good for the planet's sake. Wakana takes over control of the Museum and the Digal Corporation, bent on bringing Philip back to the Museum to complete the Gaia Impact and taking on aspects of Saeko's personality coupled with a ruthless and unforgiving streak. Prior to and during the Gaia Impact, she becomes a living Gaia Memory, fully integrating herself with the planet's vast knowledge and her Claydoll Memory. However, she loses control after Philip is removed from the True Gaia Memory, causing an explosion that destroys the Sonozaki estate. Wakana is presumed dead, but she is secretly carried out by Jun Kazu, who seeks to use her for Foundation X's purposes until Shotaro rescues her and takes her to the hospital. Days later, Wakana attempts to force her way out to resume her family's goals, only to learn Philip disappeared into the True Gaia Memory to save her. After acquiring the means to invoke the Gaia Impact from Shroud, Wakana sacrifices her own existence to bring her brother back via the Xtreme Memory.

Utilizing the Claydoll Memory in conjunction with a Gaia Driver, Wakana can transform into the Claydoll Dopant (クレイドール・ドーパント, Kureidōru Dōpanto), While transformed, she gains the ability to produce gravitational energy shots and reform her Dopant body if it gets shattered. After being given the Gaia Progressor (ガイアプログレッサー, Gaia Puroguressā), a device based on the Xtreme Memory, Wakana's Dopant form evolves into the godlike Claydoll Xtreme (クレイドールエクストリーム, Kureidōru Ekusutorīmu), which grants the use of tendrils, exponentially enhanced power, and access to the True Gaia Memory's power.

Wakana Sonozaki is portrayed by Rin Asuka in Kamen Rider W and voiced by M·A·O in Memory of Heroez and Fuuto PI: Kamen Rider Skull no Shōzō. As a young child, Wakana is portrayed by Natsuki Kasa.

===== Kirihiko Sonozaki =====
Kirihiko Sonozaki (né Sudo) (園咲 (須藤) 霧彦, Sonozaki (Sudō) Kirihiko) is one of the Museum's best Gaia Memory dealers who displays a love for Fuuto. While working for the Museum, he eventually catches Saeko's eye and they get married, with Kirihiko taking on her family's name. Now a member of the Sonozaki family, he receives the Nasca (ナスカ, Nasuka) Gaia Memory, but is initially unaware of the truth of his in-laws' true motives nor of Kamen Rider W's existence until Kirihiko confronts the latter in battle. Seeing W as a rival, Kirihiko uses him to upgrade his Gaia Memory until he discovers the truth of the Gaia Memories while suffering from his Memory's near-fatal side effects. He attempts to take Saeko away from the Museum, but she kills him to prevent him from compromising her plans and takes the Nasca Memory, which she eventually uses for herself until Wakana destroys it. His sister, Yukie Sudo, would later go on to seek revenge for Kirihiko via her own Dopant powers before the former suffers from her own Gaia Memory's negative side effects.

Utilizing the Nasca Memory in conjunction with a Gaia Driver, Kirihiko can transform into the Nasca Dopant (ナスカ・ドーパント, Nasuka Dōpanto). While transformed, he becomes an expert swordsman who wields the Nasca Blade (ナスカブレード, Nasuka Burēdo) sword and can fly via the Nasca Wings (ナスカウイング, Nasuka Uingu). His Dopant form's Level 2 state possesses superhuman speed.

Kirihiko Sonozaki is portrayed by Yuki Kimisawa.

===== Mick =====
Mick (ミック, Mikku) is Ryubee's beloved, loyal pet blue British Shorthair. Despite being a cat, he can transform into the anthropomorphic Smilodon Dopant (スミロドン・ドーパント, Sumirodon Dōpanto) and serves as a bodyguard and spy for the Museum, tackling matters outside of their estate such as hunting down Philip and traitors. After losing his Gaia Driver, Smilodon (スミロドン, Sumirodon) Memory, and Ryubee, Mick is brought to live at the Narumi Detective Office.

Utilizing the Smilodon Memory in conjunction with a Gaia Driver, Mick can transform into the Smilodon Dopant. While transformed, he gains the ability to discharge electricity and move fast enough to evade Kamen Rider W Luna Trigger's homing shots and outmaneuver Kamen Rider Accel Trial. Additionally, he is intelligent enough to know how to transform into his Dopant form and back at will.

Mick is played by a cat named Buri-chan (ブリちゃん) while the Smilodon Dopant's vocalizations are provided by Yasuhiro Takato, who also voices Mick in Fuuto PI.

==== Masquerade Dopants ====
The Masquerade Dopants (マスカレイド・ドーパント, Masukareido Dōpanto) are skeleton-esque monsters used by the Sonozaki family, later Foundation X, as foot soldiers and thugs.

With the mass-produced Masquerade (マスカレイド, Masukareido) Memories, individuals can transform into Masquerade Dopants. However, they are significantly weaker than regular Dopants as they lack special abilities of their own, can be defeated by regular humans, and their Gaia Memories can be destroyed without a Maximum Drive.

==== Shinkuro Isaka ====
Shinkuro Isaka (井坂 深紅郎, Isaka Shinkurō) is the head physician of the Isaka Medical Clinic (井坂内科医院, Isaka Naika Iin). Ten years ago, he found no meaning in his life until he encountered Ryubee attacking a group of people as the Terror Dopant. This brought a maddening joy to the doctor as he vowed to steal the Terror Memory and experimented on himself with numerous Gaia Memories and Living Connectors before Shroud gave him a Silver Memory (シルバーメモリ, Shirubā Memori) called the Weather (ウェザー, Wezā) Memory in the hopes that he would be powerful enough to eliminate Ryubee. Using his newfound powers, Isaka committed a series of murders, which included Kamen Rider Accel's family, before becoming an ally to the Museum.

Following a failed attempt to add the Invisible Memory to his arsenal, Isaka's identity is exposed and he is forced to take refuge in the Sonozaki estate, where he convinces Saeko to act on her desire to take over the Museum so he can get the Terror Memory. Initially seeing her as a pawn for his research, he slowly comes to develop feelings for her. While attempting to absorb the Quetzalcoatlus Memory, Isaka is defeated by Kamen Rider Accel and loses his Weather Memory. Shortly afterward, Isaka's experiments catch up to him and cause him to dissolve into nothingness.

Utilizing the Weather Memory, Isaka can transform into the Weather Dopant (ウェザー・ドーパント, Wezā Dōpanto). While transformed, he wields the Weather Mine (ウェザーマイン, Wezā Main) whip and can control various weather patterns, such as intense sunlight, heavy rain, lightning, tornadoes, and freezing snow. Additionally, due to his experiments and psychosis, he is immune to the Gaia Memories' negative side effects and most Maximum Drives in his Dopant form.

Shinkuro Isaka is portrayed by Tomoyuki Dan.

==== Street ====
Street (街, Machi) is a Dopant crime syndicate that seeks to continue the Museum's work with Gaia Memories as well as pursue a "greater achievement". They are based in another dimension called Shadow Fuuto (裏風都, Ura Fūto), which can only be accessed by the Road Dopant's abilities or a card-like passport known as a Vessel (ビゼル, Bizeru), and is populated by Dopants who have achieved High Dope. Similarly to the Sonozaki family, Street's high-ranking members utilize the Gaia Driver Rex (ガイアドライバーrex, Gaia Doraibā Rekusu) belt in conjunction with a Gaia Memory to transform. Additionally, they can add a secondary Gaia Memory to temporarily augment their Dopant forms. Street's ultimate goal is to accomplish the Z project, (Note: The "Z" stands for "Zenith".) where Bando plans to absorb Fuuto itself into Shadow Fuuto to create his eternal utopia. Street appears exclusively in the manga sequel Fuuto PI and its subsequent anime adaptation.

===== Yukiji Bando =====
Yukiji Bando (万灯 雪侍, Bandō Yukiji) is the leader of Street who is Tokime's twin younger brother and was formerly the CEO of the human resource development corporation Kai Operations (カイ・オペレーションズ, Kai Operēshonzu), one of Foundation X's subsidiary organizations.

Utilizing a Gold Memory called the Aurora Memory in conjunction with a Gaia Driver Rex, Bando can transform into the Aurora Dopant (オーロラ・ドーパント, Ōrora Dōpanto). While transformed, he can fire powerful energy beams from his hands which can assume the form of bladed weapons. Reaching High Dope granted his Dopant form the ability to neutralize the power of Gaia Memories.

Yukiji Bando is voiced by Daisuke Ono.

===== Kazuha Gojo =====
Kazuha Gojo (五条 一葉, Gojō Kazuha) is an insane leading member of Street, Tokime's replacement, and a former student of Otokichi Toba's cram school, through which she met Bando. She is defeated by Kamen Rider Accel and killed by the Death Dopant.

Utilizing a Silver Memory called the Scream (スクリーム, Sukurīmu) Memory in conjunction with a Gaia Driver Rex, Kazuha can transform into the Scream Dopant (スクリーム・ドーパント, Sukurīmu Dōpanto). While transformed, she can hide within shadows and produce a powerful, high-frequency shriek capable of ripping anything in its path apart. After achieving High Dope, she gained superhuman hearing.

Kazuha Gojo is voiced by Miku Itō.

===== Hideo Chiba =====
Hideo Chiba (千葉 秀夫, Chiba Hideo), real name Fildeo Herstein (フィルデオ・ヘルスタイン, Firudeo Herusutain), is the oldest leading member of Street who does not physically age and resembles a child despite having lived for more than 70 years due to his father Halber Herstein (ハルバー・ヘルスタイン, Harubā Herusutain), a genius biologist and professor at Higashi Fuuto University who received funding from Foundation X's predecessor for his immortality research and used his son as a test subject, which led to his wife Fusae Chiba (千葉 房枝, Chiba Fusae) divorcing him after Hideo was born. Though much older than the other leading members, Hideo hates being treated as an adult. To keep his body from aging for a long period of time, he requires regular use of the valuable, deadly chemical, astogurion, which was originally developed to revive undead super soldiers like the Necro-Overs on the battlefield. He later reveals himself to be Halber. When he was a child, Halber was used as a test subject in an experiment conducted as part of his father's research on immortality. The experiment caused Halber's face to age rapidly, forcing him to keep his face hidden until his old age. To reclaim his lost childhood years, Halber transferred his consciousness into Fildeo's body to use it as his new body.

Utilizing a Silver Memory called the Brachiosaurus (ブラキオサウルス, Burakiosaurusu) Memory in conjunction with a Gaia Driver Rex, Hideo can transform into the giant-sized Brachiosaurus Dopant (ブラキオサウルス・ドーパント, Burakiosaurusu Dōpanto). While transformed, he can fire sharp bones from his back and produce Masquerade Dopant-esque foot soldiers called Bones (ボーンズ, Bōnzu). After achieving High Dope, he gained the ability to manipulate people's bodies like puppets.

Hideo Chiba is voiced by Natsumi Fujiwara.

===== Reactor Dopant =====
The Reactor Dopant (リアクター・ドーパント, Riakutā Dōpanto) is a monster derived from a Silver Memory called the Reactor (リアクター, Riakutā) Memory that possesses a hot, hardened body, the ability to solidify the smoke produced from its head to use it like tentacles, and wields a mace in battle. As a side effect of using the Memory, the Dopant's heat remains in the user's body for some time and can burn them to death if they are separated from their Memory. The Reactor Dopant also commands an army of Road Dopants and manages Shadow Fuuto's energy infrastructure.

- Mamoru Nikaido (二階堂 守, Nikaidō Mamoru): A muscle-bound potential leading member of Street who requires cooling equipment due to the Reactor Memory's side effects. After achieving High Dope, he gained the ability to fire powerful energy beams from his eyes. He is defeated by Kamen Rider W before sacrificing himself to stop his men from luring the Kamen Riders into Shadow Fuuto. Mamoru Nikaido is voiced by Kenji Nomura.
- Hikaru Futami (双見 光, Futami Hikaru): A young leading member of Street and Nikaido's replacement. He was formerly a low-level member of the Seiengun gang and possessor of one of two Crab Memories who was defeated by Kamen Rider W alongside his gang leader, Tetsuo Fubuki, who Hikaru murdered. Unlike his predecessor, Hikaru utilizes a Gaia Driver Rex in conjunction with his Reactor Memory to transform and can release excess heat while reverting to his human form.

===== Nost =====
Nost (ノスト, Nosuto) is one of Hideo's three equals summoned to Japan for the final phase of Bando's plan. He sacrifices himself to become a transient pseudo-ghost to accomplish his mission just before Kamen Rider W destroys his Gaia Memory. He dissolves away upon handing Bando an SD card containing the program needed for the leader's plan.

Utilizing the Necromancer Memory in conjunction with a Gaia Driver Rex, Nost can transform into the Necromancer Dopant (ネクロマンサー・ドーパント, Nekuromansā Dōpanto). While transformed, he can levitate and fly via aerokinesis, separate his head and body, and can produce duplicates of any dead person by absorbing the Earth's memory of the dead from the air and using the fluid in his body as a medium. After achieving High Dope, he gained aerokinesis and the ability to summon the duplicates he produced.

===== Johnny Zamaguchi =====
Johnny Zamaguchi (ジョニー座間口, Jonī Zamaguchi) is one of Hideo's three equals summoned to Japan for the final phase of Street's Z project. He, Zenda, and Nost were originally used by Foundation X as test subjects for powerful Gaia Memories until Bando rescued and recruited them, and became leading members of Street after Tokime left the crime syndicate. After surviving being caught in Zenda's self-destruction explosion, Johnny tries to avenge the partner's death, only to be killed by Kamen Rider W.

Utilizing the Zone Memory in conjunction with a Gaia Driver Rex, Johnny can transform into the Zone Dopant's Level 2 state. While transformed, he can teleport multiple targets simultaneously to different spots beyond his line of sight, and assume a combat-oriented form with extended legs, two bladed tentacles, and a long tail. After melting in Zenda's explosion, Johnny's Dopant form regenerates into a giant, mutated version of itself as a result of his strong emotions at the partner's loss causing the mutation of his Gaia Memory's power. In addition to its unstable physical existence that teleports constantly, this mutated form makes a Memory Break impossible, due to Johnny being almost one with his Memory and being in an insane state.

===== Zenda Akuba =====
Zenda Akuba (ゼンダ・アクーバ, Zenda Akūba) is one of Hideo's three equals summoned to Japan for the final phase of Street's Z project. He wears a hooded coat equipped with a cooling system to control his body's heat energy. He is with Johnny due to the gradual loss of his memories as a side effect of using his Dopant powers. After regaining all his memories of Johnny, Zenda blows himself up in a last-ditch effort to stop Kamen Riders W and Accel and the Joker Dopant, only to fail in defeating them.

Utilizing the Bomb Memory in conjunction with a Gaia Driver Rex, Zenda can transform into the Bomb Dopant (ボム・ドーパント, Bomu Dōpanto). While transformed, he can turn any part of his body into a bomb. When he cancels the transformation, the parts of his body, such as his fingers or hands, that were lost when used as bombs can be regenerated. Although he gets amnesia every time he uses his Dopant powers, he never loses his loyalty to Bando.

==== Road Dopants ====
The Road Dopants (ロード・ドーパント, Rōdo Dōpanto) are monsters derived from Road (ロード, Rōdo) Memories that possess powerful jaws with multiple rows of teeth, the ability to slice through space using ultra-high speed and temperatures to generate black roads leading into Shadow Fuuto, and the ability to generate energy wheels of variable size from their wrists capable of slicing targets and burning flesh. Due to the aforementioned roads being made from the user's body, their flesh is consumed with each generation and most users become cannibals to replenish their energy, gradually losing their minds in the process. While most Road Dopants serve Street as expendable foot soldiers and assist them in expanding Shadow Fuuto, "Sabu" (サブ), a subordinate of corrupt entrepreneur Renji Tachikawa (立川 蓮司, Tachikawa Renji), operates independently to commit a series of brutal murders to satisfy his appetite until Kamen Rider W defeats him. The completion of the Z project eliminates the need for the Road Dopants, so Hikaru kills all the addicts who disobey his order to abandon their Road Memories and gives Knight Memories to the remaining 42 obedient ones.

Sabu is voiced by Kazuyuki Okitsu.

==== Knight Dopants ====
The Knight Dopants (ナイト・ドーパント, Naito Dōpanto) are monsters derived from Knight (ナイト, Naito) Memories that possess a blade in place of their right arm and two left arms, one of which is equipped with a tough shield that can enlarge to withstand most Maximum Drives. The effect of maximizing the user's loyalty desensitizes their mind to fear and pain, granting them durability that surpasses the physical limits of their body. They serve Street as new foot soldiers, replacing the Road Dopants.

==== Minor Dopants ====
- Magma Dopant (マグマ・ドーパント, Maguma Dōpanto): A Dopant derived from the Magma (マグマ, Maguma) Memory who possesses geo-thermokinesis. In episode 1, Yousuke Togawa (戸川 陽介, Togawa Yōsuke), a young man who was fired from his job at the Windscale (ウインドスケール, Uindosukēru) clothing store, acquires the Magma Memory in an attempt to seek revenge, only to be consumed by the Gaia Memory's power and go on a rampage until he is defeated by Kamen Rider W. He is then abducted and murdered by the T-Rex Dopant. In the manga sequel Fuuto PI, Tetsuo Fubuki transforms into his own version of the Magma Dopant before coming into possession of one of two Crab Memories. Later, an unnamed Seiengun member transforms into a third version of the Magma Dopant while fighting Kamen Rider Accel. Yousuke Togawa is portrayed by Yohsuke Ichinose.
- Marina Tsumura (津村 真里奈, Tsumura Marina): A childhood friend of Shotaro's, Yousuke's girlfriend, and formerly one of Windscale's top designers. Seeking revenge on Yousuke following her termination from Windscale, she purchases the T-Rex (ティーレックス, Tīrekkusu) Memory, which allows her to transform into the T-Rex Dopant (ティーレックス・ドーパント, Tīrekkusu Dōpanto). While transformed, she gains the power to cause shockwaves with her roars and combine herself with debris to form a robotic T. Rex body called the Big T-Rex (ビッグ・ティーレックス, Biggu Tīrekkusu). She hires Shotaro to find and defeat Yousuke so she can murder the latter. After Shotaro discovers the truth, Marina attempts to kill him as well, only to be defeated by Kamen Rider W and handed over to the authorities. Marina Tsumura is portrayed by Meibi Yamanouchi. As a child, Marina is portrayed by Emiri Yagi.
- Taizo Kaga (加賀 泰造, Kaga Taizō): A compulsive gambler capable of reading his opponents' tells and the owner of the secret Million Colosseo (ミリオンコロッセオ, Mirion Korosseo) casino who uses his powers as the Money Dopant (マネー・ドーパント, Manē Dōpanto) to trick debtors into betting their life forces in games of chance so he can steal and store them in Life Coins (ライフコイン, Raifu Koin) after they lose. Deducing that Kaga stores the Life Coins in his body and his destruction will kill his victims, Kamen Rider W wins the Life Coins in a game of old maid before defeating Kaga in combat, which restores his victims. Taizo Kaga is portrayed by Tatsuya Gashuin.
- Anomalocaris Dopant (アノマロカリス・ドーパント, Anomarokarisu Dōpanto): A Dopant derived from the Anomalocaris (アノマロカリス, Anomarokarisu) Memory who is capable of traveling underwater, firing their fangs like bullets, and transforming into the monstrous, non-anthropomorphic Giant Anomalocaris (巨大アノマロカリス, Kyodai Anomarokarisu). In episodes 5 and 6, Genzo Takamura (鷹村 源蔵, Takamura Genzō), the childish head of one of the Museum's Gaia Memory manufacturing centers, is hired by Ryubee to thwart councilwoman Miyabi Kusuhara's efforts to build a second Fuuto Tower. To facilitate his plan, Takamura gives a prototype model of his Anomalocaris Memory to his subordinate to serve as a decoy while he kidnaps Kusuhara's daughter Asuka Kusuhara to lure her into a trap. Ultimately however, both Takamura and his accomplice are defeated by Kamen Rider W. In the series finale, an unnamed EXE member acquires another Anomalocaris Memory and transforms into a second version of the Anomalocaris Dopant, only to be defeated by Kamen Rider Joker. In the manga sequel Fuuto PI, an unnamed Seiengun member transforms into a third version of the Anomalocaris Dopant during his fight against Kamen Rider Accel. Genzo Takamura is portrayed by Takaaki Ito, while his accomplice is portrayed by Noriyuki Enji and the unnamed EXE member is portrayed by Ryusuke Ito.
- Cockroach Dopant (コックローチ・ドーパント, Kokkurōchi Dōpanto): A Dopant derived from the Cockroach (コックローチ, Kokkurōchi) Memory who possesses superhuman speed and the ability to climb walls. In episodes 7 and 8, Ikari (伊刈), a sociopathic dōjinshi artist, uses the Dark Bug Exterminator (闇の害虫駆除, Yami no Gaichū Kujo) website to find targets to kill as the Cockroach Dopant and write about his adventures in his self-published manga Gokistar (ゴキスター, Gokisutā). Despite running afoul of Kamen Rider W, he manages to temporarily steal their equipment until Philip reclaims them so the Rider can defeat him. In the tie-in novel Novel: Kamen Rider W: The One Who Continues After Z, a second Cockroach Dopant is transformed from a Zenon Resort employee, who is defeated by Kamen Rider Accel. In the series finale, an unnamed EXE member finds another Cockroach Memory and transforms into a third version of the Cockroach Dopant, only to be defeated by Kamen Rider Joker. In the manga sequel Fuuto PI, a jewelry store robber transforms into a fourth Cockroach Dopant, who is defeated by Kamen Rider W, while Hikaru Futami transforms into a fifth version before he comes into possession of one of two Crab Memories. Additionally, an unnamed Seiengun member transforms into a sixth version during his fight against Kamen Rider Accel, while an unnamed young man with the information Yoichi Yanogami wants transforms into a seventh version. Ikari is portrayed by Jin Katagiri, while the unnamed EXE member is portrayed by Naofumi Kaneko.
- Sweets Dopant (スイーツ・ドーパント, Suītsu Dōpanto): A Dopant derived from the Sweets (スイーツ, Suītsu) Memory who possesses whipped cream capable of hardening like cement and can transform into a "Sweets Cream" (スイーツクリーム, Suītsu Kurīmu) state. In the series, Yukiko Sasaki (佐々木 由貴子, Sasaki Yukiko), a Sonozaki family maid who possesses an insatiable sweet tooth and dreamed of becoming a pâtissier, only to become a food critic due to her lack of cooking skills, acquires the Sweets Memory and becomes the Sweets Dopant to kidnap the Sonozaki family's hired pâtissiers. However, she is defeated by Kamen Rider W. In the special Kamen Rider W Returns: Kamen Rider Eternal, an unnamed man (Note: While he lacks a name, he is credited as "Sweets Man" (スイーツの男, Suītsu no Otoko).) acquires another Sweets Memory and transforms into a second version of the Sweets Dopant, only to be defeated by Kamen Rider W. In the manga sequel Fuuto PI, a third Sweets Dopant hides in Shadow Fuuto despite being a High Dope failure. Yukiko Sasaki is portrayed by Maha Hamada, while the unnamed man is portrayed by Kamen Rider W's head writer Riku Sanjo (三条 陸, Sanjō Riku).
- Sachi Yamamura (山村 幸, Yamamura Sachi): A young woman who seeks revenge on her ex-fiancé, Noriyuki Yushima, who she discovered was a conman. After she was nearly killed in a hit and run however, she attempted to use the Virus Memory and transform into the Virus Dopant (バイラス・ドーパント, Bairasu Dōpanto) to save herself at the last minute. Under normal circumstances, the Virus Dopant becomes the vector of a deadly plague that can infect entire cities. However, Sachi's transformation was interrupted and her consciousness was trapped in the Gaia Memory's influence, weakening the Virus Dopant but granting it the ability to infect electronics. Acting on her vengeful feelings, the Dopant creates an "infected car" (感染車, kansensha) to attack the gang members who nearly killed her and Yushima, but Kamen Rider W destroys the car and the Virus Memory, freeing Sachi. Sachi Yamamura is portrayed by Rinako Matsuoka.
- Violence Dopant (バイオレンス・ドーパント, Baiorensu Dōpanto): A brutish Dopant whose left arm is capable of destroying most anything in its path, such as cars, and can compress their body into a wrecking ball-like form called the Violence Ball (バイオレンスボール, Baiorensu Bōru). In the series, Tsuyoshi Ageo (上尾 強, Ageo Tsuyoshi), Wakana's weak-willed manager who loves her in spite of her abusing him, receives the Violence (バイオレンス, Baiorensu) Memory from radio DJ Motoko Saeki as part of her plot to force Wakana off the air. Overcome by the Memory's influence, Ageo assumes the alias of "Mister Question" (ミスター・クエスチョン, Misutā Kuesuchon), targeting Wakana's favorite places and portraying himself as a stalker. Upon being exposed, Ageo kidnaps Wakana and leads her to Saeki before he is defeated by Kamen Rider W while Kirihiko kills Saeki. In the manga sequel Fuuto PI, four unnamed ORIGIN members posing as teachers of the Ōdō Gakushū Juku cram school transform into Violence Dopants before they are all defeated by Kamen Rider W. Tsuyoshi Ageo is portrayed by Hiromichi Miyoshi.
- Arms Dopant (アームズ・ドーパント, Āmuzu Dōpanto): A Dopant derived from the Arms (アームズ, Āmuzu) Memory who can shapeshift its left arm into a variety of weapons, wields a giant blade called the Shield Sword (シールドソード, Shrīudo Sōdo), and possesses the Arms Bike (アームズバイク, Āmuzu Baiku) motorcycle. In the series, Kenji Kurata (倉田 剣児, Kurata Kenji), a thief and one half of the Twin Rose (ツインローズ, Tsuin Rōzu) burglar duo alongside Fuyumi Aso, was hired by Saeko to lure out Philip and received the Arms Memory to complete the task. However, he becomes an uncontrollable sadist, abandoning Aso and their morals to go on a burglary spree to lure out Kamen Rider W and take him hostage. Nevertheless, Philip uses the Fang Memory to transform into Kamen Rider W Fang Joker and defeat Kurata, who is left for the police. In the manga sequel Fuuto PI, an unnamed ORIGIN member transforms into a second version of the Arms Dopant, who is defeated by Kamen Rider Accel. Kenji Kurata is portrayed by Koichiro Nishi.
- Bird Dopant (バード・ドーパント, Bādo Dōpanto): A Dopant derived from the Bird (バード, Bādo) Memory capable of flying and firing feather darts. In the series, Akane Egusa (江草 茜, Egusa Akane), a junior high school girl, was selected by Saeko to test the limits of the Bird Memory, which the Museum developed to allow those without Living Connectors to transform into the Bird Dopant. After Akane runs away from home, her friends Toma Fujikawa (藤川 統馬, Fujikawa Tōma), Yuichi Kanamura (金村 有一, Kanamura Yūichi), and Yayoi Kubota (久保田 弥生, Kubota Yayoi) use the Bird Memory for fun until Toma uses it to attack people. After they are defeated by Kamen Rider W and taken to the hospital due to the Memory's addictive side effects, Akane suffers from withdrawal and reacquires the Bird Memory, which she uses to evolve into the Bird Dopant's Strengthened Form (強化態, Kyōkatai). She is later defeated by Kamen Rider W and Kirihiko. In the tie-in novel Novel: Kamen Rider W: The One Who Continues After Z, a second Bird Dopant is transformed from a Zenon Resort employee, who is defeated by Kamen Rider W. Akane Egusa is portrayed by Mana Konno, while Toma Fujikawa, Yuichi Kanamura, and Yayoi Kubota are portrayed by Haruki Kimura, Takuya Yoshihara, and Manami Ikura, respectively.
- Kiyoshi Katahira (片平 清, Katahira Kiyoshi): The delinquent son of florist, Makiko Katahira, who received bad press due to her son's actions. After obtaining the IceAge Memory and becoming the IceAge Dopant (アイスエイジ・ドーパント, Aisueiji Dōpanto), (Note: Alternatively referred to as the Icy Dopant (氷のドーパント, Kōri no Dōpanto).) which commands cryokinetic powers, he attacks people who enrage him. Makiko attempts to take the blame for Kiyoshi's actions, but Kamen Rider W deduces the truth before Kamen Rider Accel defeats and arrests Kiyoshi. Kiyoshi Katahira is portrayed by Kento Shibuya.
- Triceratops Dopant (トライセラトップス・ドーパント, Toraiseratoppusu Dōpanto): A Dopant derived from the Triceratops (トライセラトップス, Toraiseratoppusu) Memory who wields the Dinosaur Club (ダイノソアクラブ, Dainosoa Kurabu), possesses superhuman strength, the ability to generate plasma spheres, and the ability to transmute themselves into the giant bipedal Big Triceratops (ビッグ・トライセラトップス, Biggu Toraiseratoppusu). The first user, Aya Kujo (九条 綾, Kujō Aya), is a former Fuuto PD officer who transferred to the LAPD following encouragement from her partner Masaki Mizoguchi, whom she loved. After crooked cops Tsuyoshi Himuro and Ken Akutsu kill Mizoguchi, Aya returns to Fuuto and purchases the Triceratops Memory to take revenge against them. Despite succeeding in killing Himuro and Akutsu, the Gaia Memory's corrupting influence causes Aya to shift the target of her revenge to Fuuto itself before she is defeated by Kamen Rider Accel. In the manga sequel Fuuto PI, a second Triceratops Dopant hides in Shadow Fuuto despite failing to achieve High Dope. Aya Kujo is portrayed by Ayumi Kinoshita.
- Sachio Sawada (沢田 さちお, Sawada Sachio): A street calligrapher and poet who uses the Liar Memory to become the Liar Dopant (ライアー・ドーパント, Raiā Dōpanto), who can use the Lie Speaks (ライスピークス, Rai Supīkusu) speaker staff to convert any lie he says into Lie Needles (ライニードル, Rai Nīdoru), which compel affected individuals to fall under the Dopant's deception. Yukiho Sumida hires Sawada to help amateur musician, Jimmy Nakata, win the Fuuuuuutic Idol (フーティックアイドル, Fūtikku Aidoru) competition. While Sawada betrays her and exposes Nakata as an untalented musician, Sawada is later exposed and defeated by Kamen Riders W and Accel. Sachio Sawada is portrayed by Moro Morooka.
- Keio Horinouchi (堀之内 慶應, Horinouchi Keiō): A children's author who gained commercial success for his book The Girl and the Dollhouse (少女と人形の家, Shōjo to Ningyō no Ie), which he wrote to reflect his feelings for his daughter Rikako, who died one month prior. With the Puppeteer Memory, he can transform into the Puppeteer Dopant (パペティアー・ドーパント, Papetiā Dōpanto), who uses special puppet strings to take control of whatever he wishes and carries a flute that produces supersonic waves. Using his powers, he seeks revenge on critics who harshly reviewed his book and those who claim he did not truly love his daughter. However, he is later exposed and defeated by Kamen Rider W. Keio Horinouchi is portrayed by Wataru Shihoudou.
- Hajime Fukushima (福島 元, Fukushima Hajime): A college student at Fuuto University (風都大学, Fūto Daigaku) who fell in love with Himeka Yukimura when she called him her "prince". After realizing that she tells this to any male who assists her however, he becomes plagued by the thought of her never reciprocating his love and suffers from insomnia as a result. He later acquires the Nightmare Memory and transforms into the Nightmare Dopant (ナイトメア・ドーパント, Naitomea Dōpanto) to repay Himeka and his romantic rivals in kind via his dream manipulation capabilities and a massive dreamcatcher-like net capable of putting victims into comas. While he fakes being one of the Nightmare Dopant's victims to throw Kamen Rider W off his trail, Akiko uses her habit of sleep-talking to expose Fukushima before W defeats him. Hajime Fukushima is portrayed by Koki Kato.
- Beast Dopant (ビースト・ドーパント, Bīsuto Dōpanto): A Dopant derived from the Beast (ビースト, Bīsuto) Memory who possesses superhuman strength and regeneration. Maruo Arima (有馬 丸男, Arima Maruo), also known as "Maru" (マル), is a bank robber who acquired the Beast Memory and became the Beast Dopant to go on a crime spree with his wife Suzuko as the Zone Dopant a decade prior until she lost her Zone Memory. While Sokichi Narumi investigated and hid the Zone Memory, the case went cold until Isamu Bito took the fall. In the present, a wealthy Maruo and Suzuko attempt to finish their heist after recovering the Zone Memory, only to be defeated by Kamen Rider W. In the manga sequel Fuuto PI, a second Beast Dopant hides in Shadow Fuuto despite being a failing to achieve High Dope. They later attack Tokime, only to be killed by Hideo Chiba. Maruo Arima is portrayed by Katsuya.
- Zone Dopant (ゾーン・ドーパント, Zōn Dōpanto): A non-anthropomorphic pyramid-like Dopant derived from the Zone (ゾーン, Zōn) Memory who has the ability to teleport anything the user sees within a given area to a different spot. A decade prior, Maruo's wife Suzuko Arima (有馬 鈴子, Arima Suzuko), also known as "Bell" (ベル, Beru), assisted her husband in his crime wave until she lost the Zone Memory, which Sokichi found and hid in a bear statue. After Shotaro finds the Zone Memory and confronts Suzuko with it in the present, she steals it back and turns into the Zone Dopant to assist her husband in fighting Kamen Rider W, only to be defeated by the latter. In the manga sequel Fuuto PI, Johnny Zamaguchi transforms into a second Zone Dopant. Suzuko Arima is portrayed by Ryoko Gi.
- Yukie Sudo (須藤 雪絵, Sudō Yukie): The younger sister of Kirihiko who comes to Fuuto to take revenge against Saeko for her brother's death and join the Museum. With the Yesterday Memory, she can transform into the Yesterday Dopant (イエスタデイ・ドーパント, Iesutadei Dōpanto), gaining the ability to force anyone to repeat their actions from the previous day until they become comatose. Being immune to her Gaia Memory's corrupting influence, Yukie is able to choreograph her attacks to suit her needs. She manipulates Kamen Rider W's actions to make him kill Saeko the next day, but Kamen Rider Accel rescues Saeko at the last minute. After being exposed as the Yesterday Dopant, Yukie attempts to kill Saeko herself, but Isaka's modifications to Saeko's Taboo Memory reflects Yukie's attacks back to her. Kamen Rider W destroys Yukie's Gaia Memory, but its side effects manifest and give her amnesia. Yukie Sudo is portrayed by Kaoru Hirata.
- "Grasshopper Woman" (イナゴの女, Inago no On'na): A formerly normal woman who was kidnapped by the Museum so neuroscientist Satoshi Yamashiro can rewrite her mind and make her one of the organization's top assassins. Utilizing the Hopper (ホッパー, Hoppā) Memory, she can transform into the Hopper Dopant (ホッパー・ドーパント, Hoppā Dōpanto). While transformed, she gains superhuman jumping. Ryubee tasks the Grasshopper Woman with killing Yamashiro after he attempts to leave the Museum. She mortally wounds Yamashiro before Kamen Rider Accel destroys her Gaia Memory and Mick kills her to prevent her from leaking information about the Museum. The Grasshopper Woman is portrayed by Minami Tsukui.
- Toru Kawai (川相 透, Kawai Tōru): A shy independent film director who possesses the Gene (ジーン, Jīn) Memory, which allows him to transform into the Gene Dopant (ジーン・ドーパント, Jīn Dōpanto). While transformed, he can use his right arm-mounted DNA Mixer (DNAミキサー, Dī Enu Ē Mikisā) to alter the genetic makeup of anything he touches. Using his powers, he creates a seven-hour incomplete film and tricks theater-goers into watching it. After being defeated by Kamen Rider W, Akiko decides to rehabilitate Kawai by taking over his film's production and help him get together with the star, Ai Nijimura. After Wakana uses his powers to fuse the Gaia Progressor with her body and Akiko beats some sense into him, Kawai stands up for himself, allows W to destroy the Gene Memory, and begins working on his film his way alongside Ai. Toru Kawai is portrayed by Naoki Kawano.
- Makoto Uesugi (上杉 誠, Uesugi Makoto): A popular male model with a perverse sense of love. When his high school friend Rui Jojima falls in love with their friend Satoru Takeda, Uesugi obtains the Jewel Memory and transforms into the Jewel Dopant (ジュエル・ドーパント, Jueru Dōpanto) to seek revenge. While transformed, Uesugi possesses photokinesis, an invulnerable body capable of withstanding most Maximum Drives, and the ability to turn people into diamonds. After turning Satoru into a diamond, Uesugi forces Rui to become his unwilling accomplice and scapegoat while he turns other women into diamonds. However, Rui frames Detective Jinno, which causes a chain of events that eventually exposes Uesugi and thwarts his plans before Kamen Rider W pinpoints his Dopant form's weak spot and defeats him, restoring Uesugi's victims in the process. Makoto Uesugi is portrayed by Ryunosuke Kawai.
- Takashi Soma (相馬 卓, Sōma Takashi): A palm reader who Shroud gave the Old Memory to as part of a plan to eliminate Shotaro. As the Old Dopant (オールド・ドーパント, Ōrudo Dōpanto), Soma offers to age any person his customers hate via his Old Creak (オールドクリーク, Ōrudo Kurīku) ooze. Additionally, Soma can rotate his Dopant form and assume a faster, combat-oriented form. Despite Shroud's claim that only Kamen Rider W Cyclone Accel Xtreme can defeat the Old Dopant, Kamen Riders W and Accel work together to defeat Soma. Takashi Soma is portrayed by Masakazu Azuhata.
- "Energy" (エナジー, Enajī): An unnamed pet shop employee working under "Santa", owner of the Energy Memory, and the leader of EXE (エグゼ, Eguze), a gang of young upstarts who cause trouble in Fuuto using leftover Gaia Memories a year after the Museum's dissolution. With the Energy Memory, he can transform into the Energy Dopant (エナジー・ドーパント, Enajī Dōpanto), gaining the ability to fire electromagnetic blasts and a railgun in place of his left arm. He attempts to kill Shotaro, only to be defeated by Kamen Rider W. "Energy" is portrayed by Tomu Suetaka.

===== Other Dopants =====
- Death Dopant (デス・ドーパント, Desu Dōpanto): A Dopant derived from the Death (デス, Desu) Memory who wields a scythe and possesses tongue-like tentacles capable of neutralizing Gaia Memories and the ability to allow the user to separate from its tattered body. After Kamen Rider Skull defeated the first version sometime prior to the series, Roberto Shijima uses the Death Dopant's likeness and perceived ability to resurrect dead individuals as part of his plot to scare people to death during the events of the crossover film Kamen Rider × Kamen Rider W & Decade: Movie War 2010, only to be exposed by Kamen Rider W. During the events of the manga sequel Fuuto PI, Street assassin Yoichi Yanogami (矢ノ神 夜一, Yanogami Yoichi) becomes the new Death Dopant before he is killed by the Joker Dopant.
- Izo Aida (相田 伊三, Aida Izō): The master of the OmuriFu omelette rice shop, which is owned by his daughter Eriko Aida (相田 エリコ, Aida Eriko), who appears exclusively in the Hyper Battle DVD special Kamen Rider W: Donburi's α/Farewell Beloved Recipe. Using the combined powers of the Egg (エッグ, Eggu) and Chicken (チキン, Chikin) Memories, he transforms into the Oyakodon Dopant (親子丼・ドーパント, Oyakodon Dōpanto) (Note: Prior to being exposed, he is initially referred to as the Donburi Dopant (丼ドーパント, Donburi Dōpanto).) to attack Master's Fuu-men stand to ensure OmuriFu becomes Fuuto's primary eating establishment. Aida initially overpowers Kamen Riders W and Accel after they intervene, but Philip deduces the Oyakodon Dopant's true nature so Kamen Rider W can defeat him. Following this, Master decides not to press charges and has Aida work for him to pay off the damage and help Aida start anew instead. Izo Aida is portrayed by Hiroshi.
- T2 Nasca Dopant (T2ナスカ・ドーパント, Tī Tsū Nasuka Dōpanto): A stronger version of the Nasca Dopant derived from the T2 Nasca Memory forcibly transforming an unnamed individual. They are defeated by Kamen Rider Accel and appear exclusively in the film Kamen Rider W Forever A to Z/The Gaia Memories of Fate.
- T2 Weather Dopant (T2ウェザー・ドーパント, Tī Tsū Wezā Dōpanto): A stronger version of the Weather Dopant derived from the T2 Weather Memory forcibly transforming an unnamed individual. They are defeated by Kamen Rider Accel and appear exclusively in the film Kamen Rider W Forever A to Z/The Gaia Memories of Fate.
- Ammonite Dopant (アンモナイト・ドーパント, Anmonaito Dōpanto): A Dopant derived from the Ammonite (アンモナイト, Anmonaito) Memory. A Gaia Memory test subject died as a result of using a prototype model of the Ammonite Memory. The Ammonite Dopant appears exclusively in the tie-in novel The Beginning of N/Blood and Dreams.
- Trilobite Dopant (トリロバイト・ドーパント, Torirobaito Dōpanto): A Dopant derived from the Trilobite (トリロバイト, Torirobaito) Memory. A Gaia Memory test subject died as a result of using a prototype model of the Trilobite Memory. The Trilobite Dopant appears exclusively in the tie-in novel The Beginning of N/Blood and Dreams.
- Mammoth Dopant (マンモス・ドーパント, Manmosu Dōpanto): A Dopant derived from the Mammoth (マンモス, Manmosu) Memory. A Gaia Memory test subject died as a result of using a prototype model of the Mammoth Memory. The Mammoth Dopant appears exclusively in the tie-in novel The Beginning of N/Blood and Dreams.
- Bat Dopant (バット・ドーパント, Batto Dōpanto): (Note: The Bat Dopant is an homage to the Inhumanoid Bat Man (蝙蝠男, Kōmori Otoko) from the original Kamen Rider television series.) A Dopant derived from the Bat (バット, Batto) Memory capable of controlling machines with its ultrasonic voice. In the crossover film Kamen Rider × Kamen Rider OOO & W Featuring Skull: Movie War Core, Museum Gaia Memory dealer Eren Komori (小森 絵蓮, Komori Eren) operated as the first Bat Dopant in 1999. While assisting the Spider Dopant in his plot to kidnap Melissa, Komori was defeated by Kamen Rider Skull and left to die underneath an exploding tanker truck. In the manga sequel Fuuto PI, an unnamed man transforms into a second Bat Dopant, only to be defeated by Kamen Rider W. Eren Komori is portrayed by Reon Kadena.
- Yoshie Onodera (小野寺 由恵, Onodera Yoshie): Shotaro Ishinomori's older sister who possesses the Memory Memory, which allows her to transform into the Memory Dopant (メモリー・ドーパント, Memorī Dōpanto). Yoshie Onodera appears exclusively in the tie-in novel Kamen Rider W: Playback.
- Zenkuji Family (禅空寺家, Zenkūji-ke): The owners and operators of the conglomerate Zenon Resort (ZENONリゾート, Zenon Rizōto) (Note: ZENON stands for "ZENkuji OrgaNizer".) in Fuuto. One of Fuuto's wealthiest families, the Zenkujis fight amongst themselves over their family inheritance following the death of their patriarch, Sōji (惣治). Eventually, as Philip and Terui become involved in the investigation, members of the Zenkuji family turn their attention towards killing the illegitimate daughter Kasumi (香澄) until they are all defeated by Kamen Rider W. The Zenkuji family and their workers appear exclusively in the tie-in novel Novel: Kamen Rider W: The One Who Continues After Z.
  - Zoo Dopant (ズー・ドーパント, Zū Dōpanto): A Dopant derived from the wolf-themed Zoo (ズー, Zū) Memory who possesses various animal abilities. The Zoo Memory was originally purchased by the eldest brother Toshihide Zenkuji (禅空寺 俊英, Zenkūji Toshihide) with the intent of killing his half-sister, Kasumi, and obtaining land to establish his own Gaia Memory factory. However, Kasumi's birth mother and the Zenkujis' head maid, Azusa Yumioka (弓岡 あずさ, Yumioka Azusa), steals the Memory and transforms into the Zoo Dopant to protect her daughter before Toshihide recovers it while Azusa is fighting Kamen Rider W.
  - Asami Zenkuji (禅空寺 朝美, Zenkūji Asami): Toshihide's wife and a Museum affiliate who ranks higher than her husband and possesses the Queen Bee (クインビー, Kuin Bī) Memory, which allows her to transform into the Queen Bee Dopant (クインビー・ドーパント, Kuin Bī Dōpanto). While transformed, she becomes proficient in aerial combat, wields a stinger-like needle capable of secreting poison, and can transform Bee Dopants into suicide bombers.
  - Reiko Zenkuji (禅空寺 麗子, Zenkūji Reiko): The eldest daughter of the Zenkuji family who owns a modeling business and possesses the Flower Memory, which allows her to transform into the Flower Dopant (フラワー・ドーパント, Furawā Dōpanto). While transformed, she wields a whip, though her face becomes more vulnerable.
  - Zenon Resort employees: The Zenkujis' employees, several of whom the family transform into animal-themed Dopants as part of their reinforcements.
    - Bee Dopant (ビー・ドーパント, Bī Dōpanto): Three mass-produced versions of the Queen Bee Dopant derived from the Bee (ビー, Bī) Memory with the ability to self-destruct on her orders. One of the Bee Dopants self-destruct while the remaining two are defeated by Kamen Rider W.
    - Ape Dopant (エイプ・ドーパント, Eipu Dōpanto): A Dopant derived from the Ape (エイプ, Eipu) Memory who possesses increased jumping and fighting capabilities and a pair of claws. They are defeated by Kamen Rider W.
    - Dolphin Dopant (ドルフィン・ドーパント, Dorufin Dōpanto): A Dopant derived from the Dolphin (ドルフィン, Dorufin) who excels in underwater combat, though their dorsal fin becomes a vulnerability. They are easily defeated by Kamen Rider Accel.
    - Elephant Dopant (エレファント・ドーパント, Erefanto Dōpanto): A Dopant derived from the Elephant (エレファント, Erefanto) who possesses a thick hide and a long trunk. They are defeated by Kamen Rider W.
    - Salamander Dopant (サラマンダー・ドーパント, Saramandā Dōpanto): A Dopant derived from the Salamander (サラマンダー, Saramandā) Memory who possesses a regenerative healing factor. They are defeated by Kamen Rider Accel after Kamen Rider W disables its regenerative organ.
    - Fish Dopant (フィッシュ・ドーパント, Fisshu Dōpanto): A Dopant derived from the Fish (フィッシュ, Fisshu) who possesses sharp teeth. They are defeated by Kamen Rider W alongside the Queen Bee Dopant.
- Zero Dopant (ゼロドーパント, Zero Dōpanto): A Dopant derived from the Zero (ゼロ) Memory who is capable of nullifying a target's energy upon physical contact and wields a chain. A Museum assassin, who Toshihide Zenkuji hired to recover his Zoo Memory and tasked with obtaining cells from W Cyclone Joker Xtreme's Crystal Server. He accomplishes the task during the Zenkujis' fight against Kamen Riders W and Accel, but the latter defeats Zero and Mick kills him to prevent him from leaking information about the Museum before stealing W's cells for the Gaia Progressor. The Museum assassin appears exclusively in the tie-in novel Novel: Kamen Rider W: The One Who Continues After Z.
- Yuichi Zaizen (財前 勇一, Zaizen Yūichi): A veteran soccer player who possesses the Zebra (ゼブラ, Zebura) Memory, which allows him to transform into the Zebra Dopant (ゼブラ・ドーパント, Zebura Dōpanto). He is defeated by Kamen Rider W. Yuichi Zaizen appears exclusively in the tie-in novel Novel: Kamen Rider W: The One Who Continues After Z.
- Chuuta Tsubosaki (坪崎 忠太, Tsubosaki Chūta): The son of a poor farming family from Hokkaido who moved to Fuuto to get an office job to support his family and purchase the Toadstool (トードストール, Tōdosutōru) Memory, which allows him to transform into the Toadstool Dopant (トードストール・ドーパント, Tōdosutōru Dōpanto). After losing his money and Gaia Memory to Tokime, whom he took pity on, he comes to the Narumi Detective Office for help in retrieving his possessions for fear of the Fuuto PD discovering his use of a Gaia Memory. Upon learning her name, Tsubosaki falls in love with and vows to reform Tokime despite her becoming a murder suspect. He eventually finds her again, but Shotaro discovers the truth and attempts to convince Tsubosaki to give up his Gaia Memory. Tsubosaki refuses and is later arrested by Terui. Chuuta Tsubosaki appears exclusively in the manga sequel Fuuto PI and its anime adaptation, in which he is voiced by Tarusuke Shingaki.
- Mutsuo Mihara (美原 睦夫, Mihara Mutsuo): A video game journalist and an infamous gamer known as "Murder" (マーダー, Mādā) who possesses the Meganeura (メガネウラ, Meganeura) Memory, which allows him to transform into the Meganeura Dopant (メガネウラ・ドーパント, Meganeura Dōpanto). While transformed, he can fly and fire needle-like projectiles from the tail extending from the back of his head which double as melee weapons. His Dopant form later acquires the ability to generate wing vibrations capable of slowing down the movement of surrounding people and produce a swarm of giant dragonfly larvae from its right arm. He seeks to kill cosplay idol Megu Kazamatsuri (風祭 メグ, Kazamatsuri Megu), who won a video game match against him and made him lose face in front of an audience. Mihara is defeated by Kamen Rider W before he is killed by the Aurora Dopant. Mutsuo Mihara appears exclusively in the manga sequel Fuuto PI and its anime adaptation, in which he is voiced by Koji Okino.
- Mayu Chono (蝶野 麻友, Chō'no Mayu): A victim of marriage fraud who possesses the Caracal (カラカル, Karakaru) Memory, which allows her to transform into the Caracal Dopant (カラカル・ドーパント, Karakaru Dōpanto). While transformed, she possesses sharp, extendible claws. Due to her defective, irremovable Gaia Memory, she is forced to hide in Fuuto's sewer tunnels until Kamen Rider W destroys her Gaia Memory. Mayu Chono appears exclusively in the manga sequel Fuuto PI.
- Alcohol Dopant (アルコール・ドーパント, Arukōru Dōpanto): A Dopant derived from a Silver Memory called the Alcohol (アルコール, Arukōru) Memory who possesses the ability to make the Memory user feel no pain, shoot alcohol from its left arm, and fire a heat ray from its eye. Kiku Kagamino (鏡野 キク, Kagamino Kiku) is a friend of Ryubee's and primary user of the Alcohol Memory, having achieved High Dope and telekinesis. Kiku selects office worker Kanna Kubokura (久保倉 環奈, Kubokura Kan'na), maiko Koyomi Zaizen (財前 暦, Zaizen Koyomi), former gravure idol Kei Arito (有藤 蛍, Aritō Kei), and hostess Kurumi Nanba (難波 くるみ, Nanba Kurumi) as candidates to potentially succeed her as the Alcohol Dopant and become the fiancé of her grandson Kuya Kagamino, head of the Kagamino family. Kubokura escapes death, but Zaizen and Arito die of alcohol poisoning. Kiku is defeated by Kamen Rider W before setting fire to the Kagamino estate to die in the blaze. Kiku Kagamino, Kanna Kubokura, Koyomi Zaizen, and Kei Arito appear exclusively in the manga sequel Fuuto PI and its anime adaptation, in which they are voiced by Kyo Yaoya, Mika Kikuchi, Hitomi Ueda, and Shizuka Ishigami respectively.
- Paul Tojo (ポール東城, Pōru Tōjō): A bodywork therapist for Tojo Bonesetter (東城整骨院, Tōjō Seikotsuin) who possesses the Puzzle (パズル, Pazuru) Memory, which allows him to transform into the Puzzle Dopant (パズル・ドーパント, Pazuru Dōpanto). While transformed, he possesses four arms and can separate his body into multiple parts, transform his tetromino-shaped head parts into various weapons, and seal people's arms in his cube-shaped head parts to use them as his arms. His High Dope ability allows him to know everything about people's physical abilities via physical contact. He is defeated by Kamen Rider W. Paul Tojo appears exclusively in the manga sequel Fuuto PI.
- Antlion Dopant (アントライオン・ドーパント, Antoraion Dōpanto): A Dopant derived from the Antlion (アントライオン, Antoraion) Memory who is capable of draining humans of their moisture via its pincers, fire needle-like projectiles, and geokinesis that Kamen Rider Skull defeated in a flashback. The Antlion Dopant appears exclusively in the manga sequel Fuuto PI and the anime film Fuuto PI: Kamen Rider Skull no Shōzō, in which he is voiced by Teppei Uenishi.
- Owl Dopant (オウル・ドーパント, Ōru Dōpanto): A unique Dopant derived from two people using two Owl (オウル, Ōru) Memories that possesses superhuman strength, flight capabilities, aerokinesis, sharp talons, and the ability to separate its head and body, both of which can operate independently of each other. Additionally, the head can fly at high-speeds and possesses its own talons. Otokichi Toba (鳥羽 音吉, Toba Otokichi) is the principal of Ōdō Gakushū Juku (王道学習塾) and the head of the Gaia Memory-trafficking organization ORIGIN who can transform into the Owl Dopant's head via an Owl Memory. His High Dope ability allows him to visually identify people's most compatible Gaia Memories. He brainwashes his cram school's student, Mai Okita (沖田 舞, Okita Mai), to transform her into the Owl Dopant's body via another Owl Memory. Toba and Mai are defeated by Kamen Riders W and Accel respectively. Otokichi Toba and Mai Okita appear exclusively in the manga sequel Fuuto PI.
- Billy Butsuda (ビリー佛田, Birī Butsuda): A former racecar driver, a classic car buff, and a member of the social dropout group Bayside Bad Boys & Girls (ベイサイド・バッド・ボーイズ&ガールズ, Beisaido Baddo Bōizu Ando Gāruzu; BBB) who possesses the Trash (トラッシュ, Torasshu) Memory, which allows him to transform into the Trash Dopant (トラッシュ・ドーパント, Torasshu Dōpanto). While transformed, he possesses acidic sludge that covers the right half of his body capable of allowing objects to pass through safely and withstanding most forms of attack, acidic sludge cannons on his left arm, and the ability to eat inedible matter. His High Dope ability allows him to heal himself as well as his Dopant form by eating trash, which allowed him to recover from partial paralysis. He is defeated by Kamen Rider W before sacrificing himself to save the latter from the Aurora Dopant. Billy Butsuda appears exclusively in the manga sequel Fuuto PI.
- Crab Dopant (クラブ・ドーパント, Kurabu Dōpanto): A Dopant derived from the Crab (クラブ, Kurabu) Memory who possesses four crab leg-like arms on its back, the ability to fire crab claw-shaped energy slashes from its head, and an accelerated healing factor. Tetsuo Fubuki (風吹 鉄男, Fubuki Tetsuo), the violent leader of the Katsumi Daido worship gang Seiengun (蒼炎群; Blue Flame Gang), and his pawn, Hikaru Futami, both transform into Crab Dopants, but are defeated simultaneously by Kamen Rider W before Tetsuo is murdered by Hikaru as the Reactor Dopant. Tetsuo Fubuki appears exclusively in the manga sequel Fuuto PI.
- Luke Lancaster (ルーク・ランカスター, Rūku Rankasutā): An authority on electronics and biology and a member of LAST, a team of four experts that Ryubee puts his confidence in, who possesses a Gold Memory called the Laugh (ラーフ, Rāfu) Memory, which allows him to transform into the Laugh Dopant (ラーフ・ドーパント, Rāfu Dōpanto). While transformed, he can transform part of his skin into anything he wants. His High Dope ability allows him to absorb people's intelligence. He is defeated by Kamen Rider W. Luke Lancaster appears exclusively in the manga sequel Fuuto PI.
- Daiki Demon (出紋 大騎, Demon Daiki): An insane rogue member of Street who has a short-term memory and possesses the Deep (ディープ, Dīpu) Memory, which allows him to transform into the Deep Dopant (ディープ・ドーパント, Dīpu Dōpanto). While transformed, he possesses two tentacles on his head, which double as cutting weapons, and can swim through land and walls as if they were water. Before joining Street, he was a sidetracked employee of Kai Operations until Yukiji Bando sensed his inner darkness and promoted him to CEO's secretary. While the Deep Memory's side effects cured Demon's severe illness, it unleashed his inner darkness. He is defeated by Kamen Rider W before being consumed by a horde of Road Dopants. Daiki Demon appears exclusively in the manga sequel Fuuto PI.
- Hiromi Hashiba (羽柴 ひろみ, Hashiba Hiromi): A researcher of special biochemistry at Higashi Fuuto University (東風都大学, Higashi Fūto Daigaku) who possesses the Scissors (シザーズ, Shizāzu) Memory, which allows her to transform into the Scissors Dopant (シザーズ・ドーパント, Shizāzu Dōpanto). While transformed, she possesses four arms that can cut through anything remotely and turn into an alternate form capable of cutting through space. She is defeated by Kamen Rider W. Hiromi Hashiba appears exclusively in the manga sequel Fuuto PI.
- Shuichiro Gendo (玄道 修一郎, Gendō Shūichirō): The director of the Gaia Memory Research Institute (GRI) who possesses the Diva (ディーバ, Dība) Memory, which allows him to transform into the Diva Dopant (ディーバ・ドーパント, Dība Dōpanto). While transformed, he possesses a pair of extra arms, can generate a singing voice capable of hypnotizing and controlling anyone he wishes, and fire compressed ultra-high frequency soundwaves as explosive musical note-shaped bullets from his mouth. He is defeated by Kamen Rider W. Shuichiro Gendo appears exclusively in the manga sequel Fuuto PI.
- Issei Morikawa (森川 一清, Morikawa Issei): A pastry chef and the manager of the Amatou (天塔, Amatō) pastry shop who possesses the Hungry (ハングリー, Hangurī) Memory, which allows him to transform into the Hungry Dopant (ハングリー・ドーパント, Hangurī Dōpanto). While transformed, he can make anyone within a 100-meter radius of him suffer from nutrient starvation and make anyone who meets his gaze suffer from severe nutrient starvation. Due to the Earth's memory of hunger possessing a strong will, the Hungry Memory attains sentience and possesses Morikawa's body before it is defeated by Kamen Rider W. Issei Morikawa appears exclusively in the manga sequel Fuuto PI.
- Koppa (コッパ): The game master of a human hunting game who possesses the Quest (クエスト, Kuesuto) Memory, which allows him to transform into the Quest Dopant (クエスト・ドーパント, Kuesuto Dōpanto). While transformed, he wields a staff, can produce monsters, and place marks on objects for use as portals. He is defeated by Kamen Rider W. Koppa appears exclusively in the manga sequel Fuuto PI.
- Towa (トワ): Tokime and Bando's younger paternal half-sister and a Foundation X member who has the full name of Towa Bando (万灯 永遠, Bandō Towa) and possesses the City (シティ, Shiti) Memory, which allows her to transform into the City Dopant (シティ・ドーパント, Shiti Dōpanto). While transformed, she can create a city in another dimension. When Kamen Rider Eternal negated non-T2 Gaia Memories during NEVER's invasion of Fuuto, Towa's Gaia Memory became impossible to be ejected from her body and she went berserk, forcing Bando to seal her in Street's base. Street later separates Towa's consciousness from her body to make her consciousness one with Shadow Fuuto and use her dead body as a medium for the absorption of Fuuto into Shadow Fuuto. Towa appears exclusively in the manga sequel Fuuto PI.
- Tsumugi Unohana (卯ノ花 つむぎ, Unohana Tsumugi): The manager of the Unohana-sō (卯ノ花荘) apartment and a former Kai Operations employee who possesses the Unite (ユナイト, Yunaito) Memory, which allows her to transform into the Unite Dopant (ユナイト・ドーパント, Yunaito Dōpanto). While transformed, she possesses a body of energy fibers and can merge multiple objects. She is defeated by Kamen Rider Accel. Tsumugi Unohana appears exclusively in the manga sequel Fuuto PI.

=== Fuuto PD ===
The Fuuto PD (風都署, Fūtosho) serves as an additional force working to fight the Dopant crime wave, occasionally working with the Narumi Detective Office and Kamen Rider W in pursuit of this goal.

==== Mikio Jinno ====
Mikio Jinno (刃野 幹夫, Jinno Mikio) is a gullible senior detective of Fuuto PD. Despite his personality, he is a dedicated and sometimes wise officer. He is also a friend of Shotaro's, with whom he discusses cases despite being unaware of Shotaro's connection to Kamen Rider W.

Mikio Jinno is portrayed by Takeshi Nadagi in Kamen Rider W and voiced by Kenyu Horiuchi in Fuuto PI.

==== Shun Makura ====
Shun Makura (真倉 俊, Makura Shun) is Jinno's unpleasant rookie partner who is doubtful of Shotaro's skills and sees his involvement with police investigations as unnecessary. As such, Makura and Shotaro often get into fights when they are together, forcing Jinno to break them up. Makura is also impulsive, often jumping to conclusions when it comes to solving crimes and accusing people of committing crimes with little to no proof except from the word of a superior officer.

Shun Makura is portrayed by Shingo Nakagawa in Kamen Rider W and voiced by Chiharu Sawashiro in Fuuto PI.

=== Fuuto Irregulars ===
The Fuuto Irregulars (風都イレギュラーズ, Fūto Iregyurāzu) (Note: They are named after the Baker Street Irregulars of the Sherlock Holmes stories.) are denizens of Fuuto and informants that Shotaro goes to for information and assistance.

==== Watcherman ====
"Watcherman" (ウォッチャマン, Wotchaman) is the username of an otaku blogger who is Shotaro's informant on internet-based Dopant activities. During the events of the film Kamen Rider W Forever A to Z The Gaia Memories of Fate, Watcherman obtains the T2 Violence Memory, which forcibly transforms him into the T2 Violence Dopant (T2バイオレンス・ドーパント, Tī Tsū Baiorensu Dōpanto) until he is saved by Kamen Rider W and taken to a free clinic.

"Watcherman" is portrayed by Nasubi in Kamen Rider W and voiced by Atsushi Imaruoka in Fuuto PI.

==== Santa ====
"Santa" (サンタちゃん, Santa-chan) is a mysterious man dressed as Santa Claus year-round except on Christmas, during which he dresses in a reindeer outfit, who promotes local companies by giving out freebies, or presents, which always seem to help out the recipient. During the events of the film W Forever A to Z The Gaia Memories of Fate, Santa obtains the T2 IceAge Memory, which forcibly transforms him into the T2 IceAge Dopant (T2アイスエイジ・ドーパント, Tī Tsū Aisueiji Dōpanto) until he is saved by Kamen Rider W and taken to a free clinic. A year after W defeats Jun Kazu, Santa becomes the owner of a pet shop.

"Santa" is portrayed by Zennosuke Fukkin.

==== Queen & Elizabeth ====
"Queen" (クイーン, Kuīn) and "Elizabeth" (エリザベス, Erizabesu) are two high school girls, singers, and childhood friends of Shotaro's who serve as his informants in high school settings. As of the manga sequel Fuuto PI, they have become university students.

Queen and Elizabeth are portrayed by Tomomi Itano and Tomomi Kasai, respectively.

==== Akira Aoyama ====
Akira Aoyama (青山 晶, Aoyama Akira) is an elementary schooler, the younger brother of Yui Aoyama, and a client of Shotaro's. As of the manga sequel Fuuto PI, Akira has become a junior high schooler and the youngest member of the Fuuto Irregulars.

Akira Aoyama is portrayed by Issei Kakazu, who also portrays Shotaro as a child, and voiced by Daiki Kobayashi in Fuuto PI.

==== Frank Shirogane ====
Frank Shirogane (フランク白銀, Furanku Shirogane) is a stage magician who raised Lily Shirogane on his own after her parents died years prior and whose real name is Tasuku Shirogane (白銀 匡, Shirogane Tasuku). As of the V-Cinema sequel special Kamen Rider Accel, he has retired as a stage magician and become a coffee shop owner. As of the manga sequel Fuuto PI, he has become a member of the Fuuto Irregulars. His coffee shop is also used as a meeting place for Shotaro and the Fuuto Irregulars.

Frank Shirogane is portrayed by Fubito Yamano.

==== Lily Shirogane ====
Lily Shirogane (リリィ白銀, Riryi Shirogane) is a popular stage magician whose real name is Rie Shirogane (白銀 理恵, Shirogane Rie), and seeks to follow in her grandfather Frank Shirogane's footsteps. As part of his plans to add more Gaia Memory powers to his Dopant form, Shinkuro Isaka modifies the Invisible (インビジブル, Inbijiburu) Memory and gives it to Lily to test, knowing it will eventually kill her and allow him to take the Memory back later. Transforming into the Invisible Dopant (インビジブル・ドーパント, Inbijiburu Dōpanto), which lacks a monstrous form but retains access to the Gaia Memory's power due to Isaka's modifications, she emulates Frank's most famous trick, the "disappearing lady", only to learn too late she cannot remove the Memory from her body. She initially goes to the Narumi Detective Office for help in controlling her abilities, but later returns to Isaka, who claims he can stabilize the Invisible Memory. Ultimately, Kamen Rider Accel uses his Engine Blade to temporarily stop Lily's heart so he can remove and destroy the Invisible Memory before resuscitating her. As of the V-Cinema sequel special Kamen Rider Accel, Lily has become a waitress at Frank's coffee shop. As of the manga sequel Fuuto PI, she has become a member of the Fuuto Irregulars.

Lily Shirogane is portrayed by Nao Nagasawa in Kamen Rider W and voiced by Yuka Nukui in Fuuto PI. As a child, Lily is portrayed by Sea Kumada.

==== Kuya Kagamino ====
Kuya Kagamino (鏡野 空也, Kagamino Kūya) is the head of the Kagamino family who appears exclusively in the manga sequel Fuuto PI and its anime adaptation. After the Kiku Kagamino case is solved, he works as a construction worker to stand on his own feet and later becomes a member of the Fuuto Irregulars.

Kuya Kagamino is voiced by Taiten Kusunoki.

=== Shroud ===
"Shroud" (シュラウド, Shuraudo), formerly known as Fumine Sonozaki (園咲 文音, Sonozaki Fumine), was the matriarch of the Sonozaki family and a member of the Museum. A decade prior to the series, she sought to take her son Raito away from her husband Ryubee after the former became an avatar of the True Gaia Memory. However, she was horrifically scarred by Ryubee and left her family to seek revenge, covering her face in an extensive amount of bandages to obscure her disfigurement and taking on the identity of "Shroud".

Over the course of the intervening years, she gave Shinkuro Isaka the Weather Memory in the hopes he could defeat Ryubee. After he goes on a killing spree however, she turned to developing Kamen Riders Skull, W, and Accel's refined Gaia Memories, Rider equipment, and the T2 Gaia Memories. After Sokichi's death, Shroud became Accel's benefactor after seeing a kindred spirit in him and conditions him to become Shotaro's replacement as Raito's partner and transform them into the green/red-colored Kamen Rider W Cyclone Accel Xtreme (サイクロンアクセルエクストリーム, Saikuron Akuseru Ekusutorīmu).

Due to her dealings with Isaka being revealed however, Shroud forgoes her revenge and allows the Riders to fight their way before returning to the Sonozaki estate during Ryubee's Gaia Impact to visit Raito and tell him Shotaro is the only family he has left, which inspires him to thwart Ryubee's plans. Sometime between W's final fight with Jun Kazu and the series finale, Shroud spoke with her daughter Wakana before she quietly died by her side and became one with the Earth alongside the rest of her fallen family members.

Through unknown means, Shroud possesses supernatural powers such as pyrokinesis, the conjuring of random objects, and disappearing into thin air. Additionally, she wields the Shroud Magnum (シュラウドマグナム, Shuraudo Magunamu) handgun, which she can use in conjunction with the refined Bomb (ボム, Bomu) Memory to perform its Maximum Drive.

Shroud is portrayed by Yūki Ono and voiced by Naoko Kouda.

=== Foundation X ===
Foundation X (財団X, Zaidan Ekkusu) is a mysterious research foundation that provides funding to the Museum. Following Ryubee's death and the Museum's dissolution, Foundation X takes over their Gaia Impact project until Jun Kazu is killed, after which they re-focus their efforts on studying other prospective projects such as Kamen Rider OOO's Core Medals, Mitsuaki Gamou's Cosmic Energy, the Genm Corporation's Rider Gashats, and Kamen Rider Build's Fullbottles.

As of the web series Kamen Rider Outsiders, the organization initiates the Project Outsiders (プロジェウトサイダーズ, Purojekuto Autosaidāzu) under the helm of Joseph Rando and Ecole, where Foundation X would gather all anti-heroic and villainous Kamen Riders in order to combat the A.I. Zein.

==== Jun Kazu ====
Jun Kazu (加頭 順, Kazu Jun) is a psychic Foundation X researcher who allows himself to be modified by the research of those he represents. He comes off as cold and emotionless, speaking in a flat monotone voice and dropping whatever he is holding whenever he sees someone else display emotions. However, when sufficiently angered, he will release his emotions in a torrential manner. Becoming the Museum's sponsor and overseeing their investments, Kazu eventually obtains Dopant powers of his own.

During the events of the V-Cinema prequel Kamen Rider Eternal, Kazu served as Doctor Prospect's liaison to Foundation X and acquired his psychic powers. He also utilized the Eternal Memory and a Lost Driver to transform into Kamen Rider Eternal Red Flare (レッドフレア, Reddo Furea) until Katsumi Daido unknowingly exploits Kazu's incompatibility with the Eternal Memory to depower him. Katsumi later kills Kazu, who Foundation X recovers and turns into a Necro-Over.

Following his conversion, Kazu arrives in Fuuto to save the rogue Saeko and offer Foundation X's support in her plot to overthrow Ryubee out of love for her. After Kamen Riders W and Accel dismantle the Museum, Kazu rescues Wakana and digitizes her into a Foundation X satellite in an attempt to use her to kill all life on Earth that are not compatible with Gaia Memories and cleanse the human race's impurities. Due to Wakana's comatose state, Kazu is forced to reveal himself to the Kamen Riders and bide his time until her power returns. Upon discovering Philip is tied to Wakana's emotions, Kazu attacks everyone close to him to initiate his own Gaia Impact. When Saeko attempts to rescue Wakana, Kazu professes his love for her, but she rebuffs him. While he reluctantly kills Saeko, Shotaro rescues Wakana. Kazu attacks and battles Kamen Rider W, but they overload him with Philip's emotions before defeating him, causing Kazu to dissolve into nothingness.

Utilizing a Gold Memory called the Utopia (ユートピア, Yūtopia) Memory, which is capable of granting the user's wishes, in conjunction with a Gaia Driver, Kazu can transform into the seemingly omnipotent Utopia Dopant (ユートピア・ドーパント, Yūtopia Dōpanto). While transformed, he gains reality-bending powers, the ability to repel attacks directed at him, and absorb living beings' emotions to further power the Utopia Memory. Additionally, he can use his psychic powers to augment his Dopant powers.

Jun Kazu is portrayed by Gong Teyu.

==== Tabata ====
Tabata (田端) is a Foundation X researcher assigned to transport a suitcase containing the T2 Gaia Memories to Foundation X's headquarters during the series, only to be attacked by Katsumi Daido during the events of the film Kamen Rider W Forever: A to Z/The Gaia Memories of Fate. While Katsumi claims the T2 Eternal Memory, Tabata activates the suitcase's self-destruct, killing himself and dispersing the remaining T2 Memories throughout Fuuto.

Tabata is portrayed by Tsunekichi Takeoka.

==== Neon Ulsland ====
Neon Ulsland (ネオン・ウルスランド, Neon Urusurando) is a strict and punctual chief in Foundation X and Kazu's superior who researches unusual events or artifacts and uses the educational grading system to determine their importance to the organization. She also carries a stopwatch and allocates a specific amount of time towards her actions, even going so far as to interrupt others should it affect her schedule. After Kazu's second death, she officially ends Foundation X's Gaia Memory research. As of the manga sequel Fuuto PI, she has left Foundation X.

Neon Ulsland is portrayed by Maria Theresa Gow.

== Guest characters ==
- Miyabi Kusuhara (楠原 みやび, Kusuhara Miyabi): A Fuuto councilwoman who seeks to construct a new Fuuto Tower in her husband Daizaburo (大三郎, Daizaburō)'s memory following his death a year prior, which she kept hidden from her daughter. Miyabi Kusuhara is portrayed by Nozomi Kawata.
- Asuka Kusuhara (楠原 あすか, Kusuhara Asuka): The daughter of Miyabi and Daizaburo who is unaware of his death and believes Kamen Rider W is him. Asuka Kusuhara is portrayed by Rara Omura.
- Dango Inamoto (稲本 弾吾, Inamoto Dango): A street dancer and former partner of Chizuru Hoshino who inadvertently attracts the Cockroach Dopant's attention and secretly hires the Narumi Detective Office to atone for his mistake. After Philip forces them to reconcile, Inamoto and Hoshino revive their dance group. Dango Inamoto is portrayed by Win Morisaki.
- Chizuru Hoshino (星野 千鶴, Hoshino Chizuru): A student of Kazehana High School (風花高等学校, Kazehana Kōtō Gakkō), member of its swim team, and former dance partner of Dango Inamoto. After Philip forces them to reconcile, during which she reveals she joined the swim team to improve her dancing ability, she and Inamoto revive their dance group. Chizuru Hoshino is portrayed by Reina Fujii.
- Mai Asakawa (浅川 麻衣, Asakawa Mai): A pâtissier for the Sonozaki family who comes to the Narumi Detective Office for help in finding her missing father, a fellow pâtissier. Mai Asakawa is portrayed by Eri Otoguro.
- Kōhei Yamamura (山村 康平, Yamamura Kohei): Sachi Yamamura's brother who the Narumi Detective Office initially suspect of being the Virus Dopant. Kōhei Yamamura is portrayed by Ryo Hashizume.
- Sachio Kurosu (黒須 サチオ, Kurosu Sachio): The leader of a chop shop street gang whose members nearly killed Sachi Yamamura before she turned into the Virus Dopant, which eventually succeeds in killing them. Sachio Kurosu is portrayed by Koji Sueyoshi. (Note: Credited simply by first name.)
- Noriyuki Yushima (湯島 則之, Yushima Noriyuki): A painter and con artist who pretends to date his models so he can steal their money until he is exposed by the Virus Dopant and the Narumi Detective Office. Noriyuki Yushima is portrayed by Teppei Sakata.
- Motoko Saeki (佐伯 素子, Saeki Motoko): A DJ for the radio station Wind Wave and rival of Wakana who manipulates the latter's manager Tsuyoshi Ageo into becoming the Violence Dopant in the hopes he will kill her so she can take over her radio show. After Wakana discovers Saeki's plot, she exposes herself as a Dopant and attempts to kill her, only to stop at the last minute. Saeki subsequently tries to publicly reveal Wakana's monstrous nature on the radio, only to be killed by Kirihiko to protect the Museum's interests. Motoko Saeki is portrayed by Shion Nakamaru.
- Fuyumi Aso (麻生 冬実, Asō Fuyumi): One half of the Twin Rose burglary duo and former partner of Kenji Kurata who comes to the Narumi Detective Office for help in bringing him back to his senses after he is corrupted by the Arms Memory. Fuyumi Aso is portrayed by Yuuri Morishita.
- Makiko Katahira (片平 真紀子, Katahira Makiko): A flower coordinator and mother of Kiyoshi Katahira who receives bad press due to him. Upon discovering her son became a Dopant, she attempts to take the blame for him. Makiko Katahira is portrayed by Itsumi Osawa.
- Tsuyoshi Himuro (氷室 強, Himuro Tsuyoshi): A corrupt Fuuto PD inspector and partner of Ken Akutsu who leaks information on Gaia Memory dealers until he is killed by Aya Kujo. Tsuyoshi Himuro is portrayed by Hiroyuki Muraoka.
- Ken Akutsu (阿久津 憲, Akutsu Ken): A corrupt Fuuto PD detective and partner of Tsuyoshi Himuro. He attempts to evade the Narumi Detective Office and Fuuto PD's efforts to arrest him until he is killed by Aya Kujo. Ken Akutsu is portrayed by Hiroo Ohtaka.
- Masaki Mizoguchi (溝口 正輝, Mizoguchi Masaki): Aya Kujo's superior in the Fuuto PD and lover who uncovered Tsuyoshi Himuro and Ken Akutsu's corruption, only to be killed for it. Masaki Mizoguchi is portrayed by Keita Shirai.
- Jimmy Nakata (ジミー中田, Jimī Nakata): An untalented musician who competes in the Fuuuuuutic Idol competition, initially unaware of the Liar Dopant's unseen aid until the latter exposes the deception to collect his tears. Despite this, Shotaro and the competition judges encourage him to work hard. Nakata would later fall in love with his fan, Yukiho Sumida, and join her in working at a recycling plant. As of the film Kamen Rider W Forever: A to Z/The Gaia Memories of Fate, they have gotten married and expecting a baby. Jimmy Nakata is portrayed by Keisuke Tomita.
- Yukiho Sumida (墨田 ゆきほ, Sumida Yukiho): A recycling plant worker who came out of a depressive state after hearing Jimmy Nakata sing. Despite his lack of musical talent, a reinvigorated Sumida seeks to return the favor by hiring the Liar Dopant to help Nakata win the Fuuuuuutic Idol competition. Though the monster betrays her, she and Nakata later reconcile and enter a relationship. As of the film Kamen Rider W Forever: A to Z/The Gaia Memories of Fate, they have gotten married, with Yukiho becoming pregnant. Yukiho Sumida is portrayed by Kumiko Nakano.
- Rikako Horinouchi (堀之内 里香子, Horinouchi Rikako): The daughter of Keio Horinouchi who died a month prior, which inspired him to write the book The Girl and the Dollhouse. After he becomes the Puppeteer Dopant to attack his critics, Rikako's spirit inhabits a doll, assumes the alias "Riko" (リコ), and convinces Akiko to help her father come to terms with her death. Rikako is portrayed by Mone Sawada.
- Yuki Karakida (唐木田 有紀, Karakida Yuki): A literary critic who Keio Horinouchi attacks for criticizing his book. Yuki Karakida is portrayed by Rie Minemura.
- Senta Tama (多摩 千太, Tama Senta): A columnist that Keio Horinouchi attacks for criticizing his book. Senta Tama is portrayed by Kuniaki Fujiwara.
- Himeka Yukimura (雪村 姫香, Yukimura Himeka): A Fuuto University research student involved in a lucid dream sleep study who habitually calls every male-presenting individual who helps her "[her] prince". Despite being called out for this when her actions lead to her classmate Hajime Fukushima seeking revenge on her, she fails to learn her lesson. Himeka Yukimura is portrayed by Natsuko Aso.
- Professor Akagi (赤城教授, Akagi-kyōju): The absent-minded head of a lucid dream sleep study project at Fuuto University and boss of Hajime Fukushima. Professor Akagi is portrayed by Fuyuhiko Nishi.
- Isamu Bito (尾藤 勇, Bitō Isamu): A stallholder and an old friend of Sokichi Narumi's, referred to as "Sam" (サム, Samu). Ten years ago, Bito took the heat for an armored car robbery involving the Beastman, who was Maruo Arima and Suzuko Arima, his employee and a woman he had feelings for respectively. After the case is solved, Bito continues with his job. Isamu Bito is portrayed by Kazuyoshi Ozawa.
- Nagi Shimamoto (島本 凪, Shimamoto Nagi): A worker at the Fuuto Bird Sanctuary (風都野鳥園, Fūto Yachōen) who became the unwilling subject of Shinkuro Isaka's experiments with her Quetzalcoatlus (ケツァルコアトルス, Ketsarukoatorusu) Memory and corresponding non-anthropomorphic Quetzalcoatlus Dopant (ケツァルコアトルス・ドーパント, Ketsarukoatorusu Dōpanto) form's powers after he killed her father. After discovering her fear of him strengthened her connection to the Gaia Memory, Isaka creates a copy of it and uses it to transform a red-and-green macaw into a giant version of the Quetzalcoatlus Dopant to frighten Nagi further, with the intention of having the copy Dopant fuse with her so he can add the Quetzalcoatlus Dopant's powers to his own Dopant form. However, Kamen Rider W rescues Nagi and the macaw while Kamen Rider Accel destroys the Quetzalcoatlus Memory. Nagi Shimamoto is portrayed by Miyuu Wagawa.
- Satoshi Yamashiro (山城 諭, Yamashiro Satoshi): A turncoat Museum neuroscientist who turned the Grasshopper Woman into an assassin for the syndicate. He attempts to leave the Museum, but is killed by the Grasshopper Woman. Satoshi Yamashiro is portrayed by Ryota Nakanishi.
- Ai Nijimura (虹村 あい, Nijimura Ai): An independent film actress and star of Toru Kawai's film projects, whom he fell in love with. Ai Nijimura is portrayed by Erika Yazawa.
- Rui Jojima (城島 泪, Jōjima Rui): A friend of Makoto Uesugi from high school and his unwilling accomplice. Rui Jojima is portrayed by Kae Okumura.
- Satoru Takeda (武田 智, Takeda Satoru): A friend of Rui Jojima and Makoto Uesugi who falls in love with her. Satoru Takeda is portrayed by Yukihiro Kotani.
- Yui Aoyama (青山 唯, Aoyama Yui): Akira Aoyama's older sister who EXE took captive to acquire the Ocean Memory before Akira and Akiko save her. Yui Aoyama is portrayed by Yui Koike.
- Shiro Endo (遠藤 士郎, Endō Shirō): A co-leader of EXE who possesses the Edge (エッジ, Ejji) Memory. He attempts to acquire the Ocean Memory, but is defeated by Kamen Rider Joker. Shiro Endo is portrayed by Shohei Nanba.

== Spin-off characters ==
=== Roberto Shijima ===
Father Roberto Shijima (ロベルト志島, Roberuto Shijima) is a Catholic priest and a major figure within the Order of Silence and Darkness (闇と静寂の会, Yami to Seijaku no Kai) cult who appears exclusively in the crossover film Kamen Rider × Kamen Rider W & Decade: Movie War 2010. With the Dummy (ダミー, Damī) Memory, he assumes the likenesses of the Death Dopant and upper-class individuals' recently deceased relatives to scare them to death. When Kamen Rider W interferes, Shijima assumes Sokichi Narumi's likeness to throw them off, but W eventually exposes Shijima. The latter escapes, only to end up in another universe due to Kamen Rider Decade's battle with Super Shocker and absorbed by the Neonoid, who uses Shijima to transform into the inhuman Ultimate D.

Utilizing the Dummy Memory, Shijima can transform into the Dummy Dopant (ダミー・ドーパント, Damī Dōpanto). (Note: In promotional materials for the film, the Dummy Dopant was referred to as the "mysterious Dopant" (なぞのドーパント, Nazo no Dōpanto).) While transformed, he gains shapeshifting abilities.

Father Roberto Shijima is portrayed by Toru Tezuka.

=== Master ===
"Master" (マスター, Masutā) is the owner of "Fuu-men" (風麺, Fūmen) ramen who specializes in making ramen with large narutomaki and appears exclusively in the Hyper Battle DVD special Kamen Rider W: Donburi's α/Farewell Beloved Recipe, the film Kamen Rider W Forever A to Z The Gaia Memories of Fate, and the latter's tie-in web series Kamen Rider W Forever: From A to Z, 26 Rapid-Succession Roars of Laughter.

In the aforementioned web series, "Master" becomes the UFO Dopant (UFO・ドーパント, Yūfō Dōpanto) and travels to outer space.

"Master" is portrayed by the series' assistant line producer Hiroshi Doki (道木 広志, Dōki Hiroshi).

=== NEVER ===
The Special Mercenary Force "NEVER" (特殊傭兵部隊NEVER, Tokushu Yōhei Butai Nebā) is a group composed of humans who have been revived and turned into undead super soldiers called Necro-Overs (ネクロオーバー, Nekuroōbā) (NEVERs) who appear exclusively in the film Kamen Rider W Forever A to Z/The Gaia Memories of Fate and the V-Cinema prequel special Kamen Rider W Returns: Kamen Rider Eternal. Though much stronger, faster, and more durable than normal humans, Necro-Overs' ability to feel emotions diminishes over time and require bio-stabilizer injections to keep their bodies intact. After Foundation X abandons them to conduct research into the Museum's Gaia Memories, the NEVERs became mercenaries in an attempt to prove their superiority over the Museum.

Following an encounter with Foundation X's Doctor Prospect and their leader going mad however, NEVER seeks to destroy the Museum by acquiring Foundation X's 26 T2 Gaia Memories (T2ガイアメモリ, Tī Tsū Gaia Memori) (Note: The "T2" stands for "Type 2".) to power the X-Bicker (エクスビッカー, Ekusu Bikkā) device and convert Fuuto's residents into NEVERs like them. However, their exceptional compatibility with the T2 Gaia Memories make the NEVERs more susceptible to Kamen Riders W and Accel's Maximum Drives, which cause them to turn to dust.

==== Katsumi Daido ====
Katsumi Daido (大道 克己, Daidō Katsumi) is the leader of NEVER. As revealed in the short story "The Beginning of N/Blood and Dream" and the prequel special Kamen Rider W Returns: Kamen Rider Eternal, Katsumi was a resident of Fuuto born with a congenital heart defect. After being involved in a near-fatal car crash, his mother Maria used her research to revive her son as a Necro-Over. Using bio-stimulants to ensure he ages properly, he proves to be a superior fighter, but he and Maria are forced to go rogue after Foundation X shuts down her project. Soon after, Katsumi recruits four people who recently died into his newly formed mercenary group NEVER, converting them into Necro-Overs in the process.

During one of their missions, Katsumi meets and falls in love with Mina before acquiring the experimental Eternal Memory, which can neutralize nearby Gaia Memories, and the means to become Kamen Rider Eternal (仮面ライダーエターナル, Kamen Raidā Etānaru). However, after Mina's apparent death and losing the Memory to Doctor Prospect, Katsumi goes mad and attempts to destroy the Museum and Fuuto.

During the events of the film Kamen Rider W Forever: A to Z/The Gaia Memories of Fate, Katsumi acquires the T2 Eternal (T2エターナル, Tī Tsū Etānaru) Memory, which can negate non-T2 Gaia Memories, to regain his Rider powers before leading NEVER in acquiring the other 25 T2 Gaia Memories from Foundation X to facilitate their plans. However, Maria and Kamen Rider W thwart his plans and kill him permanently.

Utilizing the Eternal Memory in conjunction with the Lost Driver, Katsumi can transform into Kamen Rider Eternal Blue Flare (ブルーフレア, Burū Furea). While transformed, he wields the Eternal Edge (エターナルエッジ, Etānaru Ejji) dagger, which he can use in conjunction with the Eternal Memory to perform the Eternal Requiem (エターナルレクイエム, Etānaru Rekuiemu) Maximum Drive. He can also use the T2 Unicorn (T2ユニコーン, Tī Tsū Yunikōn) Memory to perform the Rider Punch.

Additionally, Katsumi can use the T2 Zone (T2ゾーン, Tī Tsū Zōn) Memory to summon the other 24 T2 Gaia Memories and use all 26 T2 Gaia Memories at once to assume his final form; Strengthening Armament (強化武装, Kyōka Busō). His Maximum Drives in this form are the Never Ending Hell (ネバーエンディングヘル, Nebā Endingu Heru) via the Lost Driver and the Bloody Hell Blade (ブラッディヘルブレイド, Buraddi Heru Bureido) via the Eternal Edge.

Katsumi Daido is portrayed by Mitsuru Matsuoka. As a teenager, he is portrayed by Masaki Suda, who also portrays Philip.

==== Kyosui Izumi ====
Kyosui Izumi (泉 京水, Izumi Kyōsui) is a flamboyant gay man with sadomasochist quirks who was originally a Yakuza subordinate before he was betrayed and fatally stabbed. He fell in love with Katsumi Daido within seconds of the former's death and became his right-hand man after becoming a Necro-Over, expressing jealousy towards anyone who gets too close to Katsumi. While assisting him in his plot to destroy Fuuto, Izumi is killed permanently by Kamen Rider OOO.

In combat, Izumi wields a whip and is an expert grappler capable of wrapping himself around people's bodies and snapping them like twigs. Utilizing the T2 Luna Memory, he can transform into the Luna Dopant (ルナ・ドーパント, Runa Dōpanto). While transformed, he gains the ability to cast illusions, extend his arms, and produce T2 Masquerade Dopants (T2マスカレイド・ドーパント, Tī Tsū Masukareido Dōpanto) for combat assistance.

Kyosui Izumi is portrayed by Genki Sudo.

==== Reika Hanehara ====
Reika Hanehara (羽原 レイカ, Hanehara Reika) is a former serial criminal who was killed while attempting to escape Alcatraz to avoid the death penalty and became the newest member of NEVER. Initially hating how cold her undead body is, she slowly comes to grips with her new existence while helping Katsumi Daido free Doctor Prospect's Quark prisoners. Despite being horrified by Katsumi's transformation into an unfeeling monster following Mina's apparent death, Hanehara believes he still has some good left in him and follows him to Fuuto to enact his plot to destroy the city. After being defeated by Kamen Rider Joker, she returns to Katsumi's side to beg for his help, only to be rebuffed and permanently die in Joker's arms.

Utilizing the T2 Heat Memory, Hanehara can transform into the Heat Dopant (ヒート・ドーパント, Hīto Dōpanto). While transformed, she gains pyrokinesis.

Reika Hanehara is portrayed by Minase Yashiro.

==== Gozo Domoto ====
Gozo Domoto (堂本 剛三, Dōmoto Gōzō) is a muscular yet dimwitted young man who is proficient in stick-fighting and died protecting a piece of land from developers before becoming a Necro-Over. Despite acquiring T2 Dopant powers while aiding Katsumi Daido in his plot to destroy Fuuto, Domoto is willing to fight Kamen Rider W without them. He is eventually killed permanently by Kamen Rider Joker.

Utilizing the T2 Metal Memory, Domoto can transform into the Metal Dopant (メタル・ドーパント, Metaru Dōpanto). While transformed, he gains superhuman strength. He also wields the Metal Cane (メタルケイン, Metaru Kein) war hammer and the Metal Claw (メタルクロー, Metaru Kurō).

Gozo Domoto is portrayed by Koji Nakamura.

==== Ken Ashihara ====
Ken Ashihara (葦原 賢, Ashihara Ken) is a young firearms expert and marksman who was killed in a gunfight and left behind a family. While aiding Katsumi Daido in his plot to destroy Fuuto, Ashihara fights Kamen Rider Accel on several occasions before the latter permanently kills him.

Utilizing the T2 Trigger Memory, Ashihara can transform into the Trigger Dopant (トリガー・ドーパント, Torigā Dōpanto). While transformed, he gains a large rifle in place of his right arm.

Ken Ashihara is portrayed by Masayuki Deai.

==== Maria Daido ====
Maria Daido (大道 マリア, Daidō Maria), also known as Professor Maria (プロフェッサー・マリア, Purofessā Maria), was a researcher for Foundation X who created undead humans called Necro-Overs in an attempt to replicate the conditions that turned Raito Sonozaki into the True Gaia Memory's avatar and appears exclusively in the film Kamen Rider W Forever A to Z The Gaia Memories of Fate and the prequel special Kamen Rider W Returns: Kamen Rider Eternal. When her son Katsumi was nearly killed in a car accident, she used her research to revive him as a Necro-Over, but was forced to leave Foundation X after they abandoned her in favor of researching the Museum's Gaia Memories.

Following this, Maria supported Katsumi in his mercenary activities before eventually returning to Fuuto with him. After obtaining T2 Dopant powers and discovering Raito, Maria goes undercover as Interpol agent Maria S. Cranberry (マリア・S・クランベリー, Maria Esu Kuranberī) so she could manipulate and kidnap him for Katsumi's plan to destroy Fuuto. At the last minute however, she gets second thoughts and tries to stop Katsumi, only to be killed by him.

Utilizing the T2 Cyclone Memory, Maria can transform into the Cyclone Dopant (サイクロン・ドーパント, Saikuron Dōpanto). While transformed, she gains aerokinesis.

Maria Daido is portrayed by Aya Sugimoto.

=== Keith Anderson ===
Keith Anderson (キース・アンダーソン, Kīsu Andāson) is a ruthless Foundation X agent who appears exclusively in the short novel The Beginning of N/Blood and Dream. Keith took Maria Daido under his wing to fund her Necro-Over project following her partner's betrayal while competing with Kazu in a bid to gain approval from the Museum. Once Kazu's Gaia Memory project was chosen, Keith tries to kill his subordinates and the Daido family in a fit of rage, but Katsumi saves his mother and kills Keith.

=== Seiichiro Matsui ===
Seiichiro Matsui (松井 誠一郎, Matsui Seiichirō), also known as "Matsu" (マツ), was Sokichi Narumi's former partner from 1999 who conducted research in libraries and appears exclusively in the crossover film Kamen Rider × Kamen Rider OOO & W Featuring Skull: Movie War Core. Despite working with him, Matsu secretly harbored jealousy towards Sokichi for always "getting the girl". After being hired by Melissa to protect her from Kozo Yaguchi, a chain of events resulted in Matsu getting ahold of the Spider Memory and becoming one of the first Gaia Memory users while in pursuit of his goal. As his mind became warped by the memory, Matsu's feelings for Melissa became amplified to the point where he wanted her all to himself. Sokichi eventually deduced Matsu's identity and killed him while destroying his Gaia Memory despite still seeing him as his partner.

Utilizing the Spider (スパイダー, Supaidā) Memory, Matsu could transform into the Spider Dopant (スパイダー・ドーパント, Supaidā Dōpanto). While transformed, he can produce Spider Net (スパイダーネット, Supaidā Netto) threads for multiple purposes and implant small Spider Bombs (スパイダーボム, Supaidā Bomu) into humans, which spin silk around a person's closest loved one and explode upon contact with them. (Note: The Spider Dopant is an homage to the Inhumanoid Spider Man (蜘蛛男, Kumo Otoko) from the original Kamen Rider television series.)

Seiichiro "Matsu" Matsui is portrayed by Taro Yamamoto.

=== Melissa ===
Melissa (メリッサ, Merissa) is a famous opera singer who came to Fuuto in 1999 and appears exclusively in the crossover film Kamen Rider × Kamen Rider OOO & W Featuring Skull: Movie War Core. After meeting Sokichi Narumi and due to an encounter with the Spider Dopant, she agreed to take the former's place at his daughter Akiko's wedding in the present.

Melissa is portrayed by Hikaru Yamamoto, who also portrays Akiko, in Movie War Core and voiced by Mikako Komatsu, who also voices Akiko, in Fuuto PI: Kamen Rider Skull no Shōzō.

=== Kozo Yaguchi ===
Kozo Yaguchi (矢口 孝三, Yaguchi Kōzō) is Melissa's manager and head of the Yaguchi Talent Agency who appears exclusively in the crossover film Kamen Rider × Kamen Rider OOO & W Featuring Skull: Movie War Core. Because of his seedy nature, Sokichi considered Yaguchi a suspect for the Spider Dopant's identity, only to learn Yaguchi was actually using his agency to supply the Museum with guinea pigs before Yaguchi was killed by a Spider Bomb that the Spider Dopant implanted in the former's wife.

Kozo Yaguchi is portrayed by Kenta Satoi.

=== Stone ===
"Stone" (ストーン, Sutōn) is an unassuming architecture otaku skilled in lock picking who appears exclusively in the crossover film Kamen Rider × Kamen Rider OOO & W Featuring Skull: Movie War Core. After Isamu Bito introduced Stone to Sokichi Narumi to help him solve the "Spider Man" case, Stone helped Sokichi break into the Yaguchi Talent Agency, but the former was captured and murdered by the Bat Dopant.

Stone is portrayed by Shiro Tsubuyaki.

=== Kamen Rider Core ===
Kamen Rider Core (仮面ライダーコア, Kamen Raidā Koa) is a giant magma-themed monster created from the Memory (メモリー, Memorī) Memory and the Ebi, Kani, and Sasori Core Medals who appears exclusively in the crossover film Kamen Rider × Kamen Rider OOO & W Featuring Skull: Movie War Core. He attempts to destroy the world, but is foiled and destroyed by Kamen Riders W and OOO, who shatter the Gaia Memory and Core Medals in the process.

In battle, Core is powered by Earth's inner core, allowing him to burn anything within physical contact, possesses pyrokinesis, and can turn the lower half of his body into a motorcycle.

Kamen Rider Core is voiced by Fumihiko Tachiki.

=== Aoi Katsuragi ===
Aoi Katsuragi (葛木 葵, Katsuragi Aoi) is a member of a pick-pocketing ring and the daughter of a thief who appears exclusively in the V-Cinema sequel special Kamen Rider W Returns: Kamen Rider Accel. Sometime prior to the special, she witnessed Hiroshi Sagami of the Fuuto PD murder her father, but initially could not recall his face. As a result, Katsuragi came to distrust police officers. In the present, she comes into possession of the Gaia Memory Enhancing Adapter and comes into Kamen Rider Accel's protective custody after Sagami targets her for the adapter. Following Sagami's arrest, Katsuragi turns herself in as part of an effort to better herself and start over.

Aoi Katsuragi is portrayed by Yukari Taki.

=== Hiroshi Sagami ===
Hiroshi Sagami (相模 広志, Sagami Hiroshi) is a corrupt police officer within the Fuuto PD who appears exclusively in the V-Cinema sequel special Kamen Rider W Returns: Kamen Rider Accel. Three years prior to the special, he lost his wife to a criminal he had arrested sometime prior. Furious with the law's inability to reform criminals, he obtained the Commander Memory and began executing any criminals he came across regardless of the severity of their crimes. Seeing Terui as a kindred spirit, Sagami kidnaps the former's wife, Akiko, to force him to give into his vengeful feelings once more and become Sagami's successor. Refusing to go down this path again, Terui saves Akiko and defeats Sagami, who is taken into custody.

Utilizing the Commander (コマンダー, Komandā) Memory, Sagami can transform into the "One Dopant Army" (ワン・ドーパント・アーミー, Wan Dōpanto Āmī), the Commander Dopant (コマンダー・ドーパント, Komandā Dōpanto). While transformed, he can create Kamen Soldiers (仮面兵士, Kamen Heishi; Masked Soldiers) to fight for him and possesses a gauntlet capable of materializing and destroying matter. After obtaining the Gaia Memory Enhancing Adapter, Sagami upgrades his Dopant form and gains the ability to fire a barrage of missiles.

Hiroshi Sagami is portrayed by Minoru Tanaka.

=== Mina ===
Mina (ミーナ, Mīna) is a young woman and one of Doctor Prospect's Quarks who possesses pyro- and telekinesis, psychometry, and appears exclusively in the V-Cinema sequel special Kamen Rider W Returns: Kamen Rider Eternal. After NEVER stumbled onto Prospect's work, Mina betrayed him and joined forces with the mercenaries in the hopes of rescuing her fellow Quarks. However, Prospect used his Dopant powers to kill the Quarks. While Mina survived, her apparent death led to NEVER's leader Katsumi Daido going mad and attempting to destroy Fuuto. Believing Katsumi was still a hero, Mina eventually comes to Fuuto herself to avenge him by killing Kamen Rider W, only to learn of what Katsumi did and tell W what he did for her in turn.

Mina is portrayed by Rin Takanashi.

=== Doctor Prospect ===
Doctor Prospect (ドクター・プロスペクト, Dokutā Purosupekuto) is a Foundation X scientist who studied the use of psychics, created an army of psychic super soldiers called Quarks (クオークス, Kuōkusu), and appears exclusively in the V-Cinema prequel special Kamen Rider W Returns: Kamen Rider Eternal. To keep the Quarks in line and weed out weaker Quarks, he utilized Dopant powers and a barrier known as the Heaven's Horn (ヘブンズホーン, Hebunzu Hōn) respectively. After NEVER threatened his plans, Prospect killed most of the Quarks, but NEVER's leader Katsumi Daido destroyed the former's Gaia Memory and killed Prospect with his own Dopant powers.

Utilizing the Eyes (アイズ, Aizu) Memory, Prospect could transform into the Eyes Dopant (アイズ・ドーパント, Aizu Dōpanto). While transformed, he could detect an opponent's next move and counter accordingly and brand victims with eye markings that will kill them should they disobey him.

Doctor Prospect is portrayed by Jyunichi Haruta.

==== Lloyd and Shion ====
Lloyd (ロイド, Roido) and Shion (シオン) are Doctor Prospect's Quark bodyguards who serve him until they are killed by NEVER members Gozo Domoto and Kyosui Izumi respectively.

Lloyd and Shion are portrayed by Sho Tomita and Sanae Hitomi respectively.

=== Nagi Ohshima ===
Nagi Ohshima (大嶋 凪, Ōshima Nagi) is a Museum member who serves Saeko as her aide and appears exclusively in the anime film Fuuto PI: Kamen Rider Skull no Shōzō. He dies due to his Gaia Memory being destroyed by Kamen Rider W.

Utilizing the Ocean (オーシャン, Ōshan) Memory, Ohshima could transform into the Ocean Dopant (オーシャン・ドーパント, Ōshan Dōpanto). While transformed, he gained hydrokinesis.

Nagi Ohshima is voiced by Jun Fukuyama.
