= Rin Asuka =

Japanese actress

- 飛鳥 凛
- Born: March 28, 1991 (age 34); Osaka Prefecture, Japan
- Occupations: Actress; tarento; singer
- Years active: 2006–present
- Agent: Agape
- Notable work: Kamen Rider W; Carved 2: The Scissors Massacre; Shrill Cries of Summer
- Height: 168 cm (5 ft 6 in)
- Website: www.agape-ag.co.jp

Rin Asuka (飛鳥 凛, Asuka Rin; March 28, 1991) is a Japanese actress from Osaka Prefecture. Her debut role was in the film Tenshi ga Kureta Mono, and she was later cast in the film adaptations of Higurashi no Naku Koro ni as Mion Sonozaki. She also played Akira Karasaki for several episodes of K-tai Investigator 7. In 2009, Asuka joined the cast of Kamen Rider W as Wakana Sonozaki.

== Filmography ==
=== Films ===
Year	Title	Role
2008	Carved 2: The Scissors Massacre	Mayumi Sawada, Kuchisake-onna
2008	Shrill Cries of Summer	Mion Sonozaki
2008	Dōsōkai	Eri Ishikawa (High school years)
2008	Tricom!!! Triple Complex Returns	Hitomi Katsuragi
2008	Uniform SurviGirl I	Sakura Natsume
2008	Uniform SurviGirl II	Sakura Natsume
2009	Shrill Cries: Reshuffle	Mion Sonozaki
2009	Kamen Rider × Kamen Rider W & Decade: Movie War 2010	Wakana Sonozaki
2010	Kamen Rider W Forever: A to Z/The Gaia Memories of Fate	Wakana Sonozaki
2011	Vanished: Girl in the Woods	Rena Nishikawa
2012	Piece: Kioku no Kakera	Haruka Gomi
2017	White Lily	Haruka
2018	Nomitori Samurai	
2019	The Woman Who Keeps a Murderer	Kyoko
2021	The Road to Murder: The Movie	
2022	Kamen Rider Saber: Trio of Deep Sin	Yuina Tachibana

=== Television ===
Year	Title	Role	Notes
2007	Asakusa Fukumaru Ryokan	Junko Sonoda	Episode 2
2008	K-tai Investigator 7	Akira Karasaki	
2008	Hoshi Shinichi Short Short "Destiny"		
2008	Hiroe no Michishirube	Yoshiko Nakamoto	
2008	Last Mail	Nozomi Watase	
2009	Okan no Gyakushū: Wagaya no Reform Sensō	Saori Mihara	
2009	Kamen Rider W	Wakana Sonozaki/ClayDoll Dopant(voice)	
2010	Getsuyo Golden "Onna furai majishan Mariko no satsujin jiken-bo"	Satomi Motomiya	
2010	Tales of the Unusual 20th Anniversary Special Autumn: Ninki Sakka Kyoen Hen "Hansai"	Yukie Tada	
2011	Rokudenashi Blues	Mafuyu	Episode 7
2012	Fukuoka Renai Hakusho "Kimi no Egao ni Furetakute"	Nami Satake	
2012	Omiya-san	Yurie Hirano	Episode 2
2012	Juho 2405: Watashi ga Shinu Wake	Sae Hayashi	Episodes 3–4
2013	Last Train Bye-Bye!	Guide's lover	Episode. 6
2013	Tenshi to Jump	Yuuki Abe	
2014	Dr.DMAT	Miki Aizawa	Episodes 1–4
2014	White Lab	Ayane Asakura	Episode 1
2015	Ghost Theater (TV series)	Yumi Okita	Episode 1
2016	Keishichō Sōsaikka 9 Kakari season 11	Kaori Yanase	Episode 1
2016	Midnight Department Store: Welcome to the Secret Room		
2020	The Road to Murder		Miniseries

=== Web Drama ===
Year	Title	Role
2008	Kētai Ren'ai Drama 100 Scenes no Koi Vol. 2 Sakuhin NO. 2 Itoshi no Pure Pink: Hero hen	Izumi
2012	Pantene: Cinderella Project – "Cherry Blossoms"	Yuri

=== Stage ===
Year	Title	Role
2007	Saiyuki	Princess Jade
2011	11 no Sasayakana Uso	Eri Mitsuhashi
2015	BIOHAZARD THE STAGE	Rebecca Chambers
2015	The Earth Art Neoline Shinsei Sōzō Mono: Sono Rōjin wa Dare Yori mo Wakakatta	

=== Radio ===
Year	Title	Role
2009	DJ Tomoaki's Radio Show!	Assistant MC

=== Commercial ===
Year	Title
2007	Bourbon – "Chotos"
2009	Meiji Dairies – "Meiji Delicious Milk"
2010	Hitachi Wooo – "Recording TV, Introduction to Wooo." (Web only/navigator)
2012	Pip Slim Walk
2012	Tatsumi Planning
2013	Gulliver International – "Secondhand Car Gulliver"
2014	Prince Hotels – "Prince Snow Resort"

=== Music video ===
Year	Title	Artist
2006	"Invitation"	Ko Shibasaki
2007	"Honey Beat"	V6
2007	"Corona"	Sakura Merry-Men
2011	"Yume no Mukou de"	Ken Hirai
2012	"Kimi no Hikari"	KG
