= White Lily (film) =

- Film poster
- ホワイトリリー
- Directed by: Hideo Nakata
- Written by: Jun'ya Katō; Ryūta Miyake
- Produced by: Naoko Komuro; Saori Nishio; Kiyoe Takage; Masahiko Takahashi; Tadashi Tanaka; Akira Yamamoto; Keizō Yuri
- Starring: Rin Asuka; Kaori Yamaguchi
- Cinematography: Ryūto Kondō
- Edited by: Naoko Aono
- Music by: Shūichi Sakamoto
- Production companies: Django Film; Nikkatsu
- Distributed by: Nikkatsu
- Release dates: October 7, 2016 (Busan International Film Festival); February 11, 2017 (Japan)
- Running time: 80 minutes
- Country: Japan
- Language: Japanese

White Lily (ホワイトリリー) is a 2016 Japanese drama film directed by Hideo Nakata. It was released by Nikkatsu as the fifth film in the reboot of its Roman Porno ("romantic pornography") series. Other directors involved in the series include Sion Sono, Akihiko Shiota, Kazuya Shiraishi, and Isao Yukisada.

== Plot ==
Tokiko, a renowned ceramic artist, and her husband encounter Haruka, a teenage runaway, and take her into their home, where Tokiko teaches her about ceramics. When Tokiko's husband dies, Haruka promises to remain with her teacher and to do anything that she asks. They develop a lesbian relationship but Tokiko drowns her sorrows in alcohol and has a series of meaningless sexual encounters with a variety of men while Haruka can hear them in another room.

Tokiko eventually invites Satoru, a promising young student, to be her apprentice and initiates a sexual relationship with him, even though he tells her that he has a girlfriend. Satoru becomes interested in Haruka, who is the same age as he is, and aggressively flirts with her. Tokiko catches them and angrily accuses Haruka of liking men, forcing them to have sex on the table in front of her. Satoru's girlfriend Akane discovers them and grabs a large kitchen knife, threatening to kill herself. Satoru jumps at her and she cuts him with the knife. She then charges at Tokiko with the knife but Haruka jumps in front of Tokiko and is stabbed in the stomach.

Six months later, Haruka surprises Tokiko by returning to her atelier, where the two make love again.

== Cast ==
- Rin Asuka as Haruka
- Kaori Yamaguchi as Tokiko / Ceramist
- Shōma Machii as Satoru
- Kanako Nishikawa as Akane / Satoru's girlfriend
- Ichirō Mikami
- Yuki Enomoto
- Miki Hayashida
- Kōko Itō
- Tarō Kamakura
- Hisako Matsuyama

== Release ==
The film premiered at the Busan International Film Festival in Busan, South Korea on October 7, 2016, and was later released in Japan on February 11, 2017.

== Reception ==
James Marsh of the South China Morning Post gave the film 1.5/5 stars in a negative review in which he wrote that the director "fails to rise above plot's perfunctory soft core trappings in this unimaginatively told story of infatuation and jealousy".
