= List of Fuuto PI episodes =

Keyvisual of the anime featuring (from left to right) Philip, Tokime and Shotaro.

Taking place two years after the Kamen Rider W tokusatsu TV series' finale, Fuuto PI is a manga sees the return of Shotaro Hidari, a private detective who works at Narumi Detective Agency, and his partner Raito "Philip" Sonozaki, the sole survivor of the Sonozaki family who can access the Gaia Library as research for Shotaro's work. Together they transform into the superhero Kamen Rider W, who protects the city of Fuuto from Dopants, monsters created by items called Gaia Memories. An anime television series adaptation was announced on April 3, 2021. The series was animated by Studio Kai. Yousuke Kabashima is directing the series, with Tatsuto Higuchi handling series' composition, Hidekazu Ebina designing the characters, and Kōtarō Nakagawa and Shuhei Naruse composing the series' music.

The series debuted on streaming platform U-Next on August 1, 2022, before premiering on Tokyo MX on August 8. The opening theme song is "Private Eye" by Big Gadgets featuring Aya Kamiki with Takuya, while the ending theme song is "Tsumi to Batsu to Underground" (罪と罰とアングラ; "Crime, Punishment, and the Underground") by Mitsuru Matsuoka and Kōji Kikkawa, who previously portrayed Kamen Riders Eternal and Skull. The series was initially licensed by Funimation but was moved to Crunchyroll following Sony's acquisition of the platform. Muse Communication, in which they owned and carried Kamen Rider series in Taiwan, licensed the series in Southeast Asia. The episodes were collected in two Blu-rays released in Japan on October 9, 2024.

== Episodes ==
| No. | Title (Note: All English episode titles are taken from Crunchyroll.) | Original release date |
|---|---|---|
| 1 | "Beware of t / The Man Who Loved a Witch"; Transliteration: "Tī ni Ki o Tsukero / Majo ni Koi Shita Otoko" (Japanese: tに気をつけろ / 魔女に恋した男) | August 1, 2022 |
In the windy city of Fuuto, private detective Shotaro Hidari passes by a mysterious woman who disappears just as mysteriously. Later that night at the Narumi Detective Agency, run by chief Akiko Narumi, a client named Chuuta Tsubosaki asks the agency's help in finding a self-proclaimed witch, who he had fallen in love with after she stole his bag. Believing it to be the same woman from earlier, Shotaro goes to investigate and eventually manages to chase down the woman in question, Tokime. She manages to escape, however, as Shotaro suddenly finds himself in a middle of a building belonging to the Tachikawa Group, later learning from the police that one of Tachikawa's men was allegedly murdered by Tokime. The next day, Shotaro and Chuuta track down Tokime and chase her down into a strange alternate version of Fuuto, where they come under attack by an unseen assailant. It is at this point that Shotaro's partner, Philip, arrives on the scene.
| 2 | "Beware of t / The Culprit Is Right There"; Transliteration: "Tī ni Ki o Tsukero / Yatsu wa Soko ni Iru" (Japanese: tに気をつけろ / 犯人(ヤツ)はそこにいる) | August 8, 2022 |
After Tokime escapes by sinking through a wall, returning the others to the real Fuuto, Shotaro deduces that the crime involves a Gaia Memory, which turns people into powerful monsters known as Dopants, asking Philip to use his ability to access the Infinite Archive and narrow it down to the Road Memory, which allows its user to cross dimensions and create fake dimensions with blood. The next day, after another victim puts further suspicion on Tokime, Shotaro, still having his doubts, gets some leads on her from middle school student Akira, which leads him to another encounter with Chuuta and the Road Dopant and more cryptic words from Tokime. Taking offense at Philip's conviction that Tokime is the Road Dopant, Shotaro goes off on his own to confront Tokime, discovering that she has amnesia and carries around a broken Memory that heats up when Dopants are nearby. When they are surrounded by Tachikawa's group, Shotaro deduces that the Road Dopant is actually one of Tachikawa's men, Sabu, who used the Memory to satisfy his cannibalistic urges. It is then that Philip arrives on the scene, upon which he and Shotaro use the Cyclone and Joker Memories to transform into Kamen Rider W.
| 3 | "Beware of t / The Masked Defender"; Transliteration: "Tī ni Ki o Tsukero / Kamen no Shugoshin" (Japanese: tに気をつけろ / 仮面の守護神) | August 15, 2022 |
The Road Dopant attempts to escape into Shadow Fuuto, but Shotaro and Philip use the form-changing abilities of Kamen Rider W to chase him down and destroy his Memory. Afterwards, Shotaro confronts Chuuta, who was actually a Dopant whose stolen bag contained the Toadstool Memory and used the Narumi Detective Agency as a means to retrieve it. Philip also deduces that the rumors of the witch spawned from Tokime using the dimensional holes the Road Dopant made, proving that Tokime herself is not a Dopant. Chuuta is arrested, with Tokime giving Shotaro a kiss before turning herself in as well. However, Tokime is shortly released and hired by Akiko to be Shotaro's assistant so they can help her figure out the mystery behind her amnesia. As Shotaro tries to adjust to this new life, a Dopant possessing the Aurora enemy lies in Shadow Fuuto, searching for Tokime.
| 4 | "The Terrible m / Wings of Death"; Transliteration: "Saiaku no Emu / Shi o Yobu Haoto" (Japanese: 最悪のm / 死を呼ぶ羽音) | August 22, 2022 |
Narumi Detective Agency is hired by games company Max Soft to bodyguard Monako Moriguchi, the main programmer for the game Monster El Dorado who, unknown to the public, is also the game's idol Megu Kazamatsuri, after Megu receives death threats from someone known as "m". Meanwhile, Philip has trouble getting along with Tokime due to their conflicting personalities. As Monako performs as Megu at an anniversary event for the game, the event comes under attack from a Meganeura Dopant, who seeks vengeance against Megu. Although Kamen Rider W steps in to fight against it, the Dopant proves to have stronger powers than expected, including the power to control gravity. At that moment, Tokime is almost lured aware by a mysterious force, leaving Monako defenseless and forcing Kamen Rider W to rush in to protect her from the Dopant's attack. Receiving heavy damage to his body as a result, Shotaro entrusts Tokime and the others to continue protecting Monako.
| 5 | "The Terrible m / The Sound of a Leak"; Transliteration: "Saiaku no Emu / Mikkokusha" (Japanese: 最悪のm / 密告者) | August 29, 2022 |
As Philip takes over the investigation for the injured Shotaro and calls in the help of Akiko's husband, police detective Ryu Terui, Monako deduces the Dopant to be a gamer known as Murder. Meanwhile, a man named Yukiji Bando appears before Murder, inviting him to a city of some kind before they are forced to flee his apartment following a tip-off about Ryu's raid. After Majima tries to force Monako into appearing in a livestream, Shotaro forces himself out of bed to help Monako realize that, despite how she acts, she really does enjoy performing as Megu. While Akiko gives Philip some encouragement over his jealousy with Tokime, Tokime and Majima discover that one of Monako's makeup artists, Midori Koizumi, is the informant leaking information to Murder, learning that she had just told him about Megu's true identity. Using a power-up drug he received from Bando, Murder launches an attack on Monako, using a new ability to spread monsters all across the building. Tokime rushes in to stop Murder from escaping with Monako before Philip catches up to them, using the Fang Memory to transform into Kamen Rider W's Fang Joker form with his body.
| 6 | "The Terrible m / White Fangs"; Transliteration: "Saiaku no Emu / Shiroi Kiba" (Japanese: 最悪のm / 白い牙) | September 5, 2022 |
Philip deduces that the Meganeura Dopant's pressure inducing ability lies in a hidden set of wings, allowing Kamen Rider W to disable them and defeat Murder. Following the incident, Monako's manager Majima, who had been fighting against management for their poor treatment of Monako, leaves the company to form his own game studio, with Monako deciding to go along with him. Afterwards, as Philip makes peace with Tokime and gifts her a Stag Phone to welcome her to the team, Bando disposes of Murder while he is in police custody.
| 7 | "The Closed k / Dynamic Duo, Deserted"; Transliteration: "Tozasareta Kē / Mei Konbi Sōnan" (Japanese: 閉ざされたk / 名コンビ遭難) | September 12, 2022 |
As Shotaro and Philip get lost in a blizzard while mushroom hunting in the mountains, they are rescued by a woman who brings them to a mansion. They learn from the mansion's owner, Kuya Kagamino, tells them he is hosting a "fox's wedding" in which four potential brides in masks, the rescuer Kanna Kubokura included, must try to appeal to him over four days without letting their identities be found out. Shotaro and Philip agree to take part in exchange for shelter, joined by Bando, who is going under the identity of art dealer Daisuke Kanamori. Later that night, after hearing a cryptic plea for help from Kanna, Shotaro discovers one of the candidates, Koyomi Zaizen, impaled on a tree before he and Philip have to fight against an Alcohol Dopant. Believing the culprit to be someone from the mansion, including Kanna and the other candidates Kurumi Nanba and Kei Arito, Shotaro begins his investigation.
| 8 | "The Closed k / A Chain of Malice"; Transliteration: "Tozasareta Kē / Rensa Suru Akui" (Japanese: 閉ざされたk / 連鎖する悪意) | September 19, 2022 |
Kei becomes the next victim after Kurumi discovers her dead in the bath, with Kanna suspiciously absent from the crime scene. On the fourth day, Kurumi, revealed to be in possession of the Alcohol Memory, attempts to stop Kanna from leaving the mansion, only for it to actually be Philip in disguise, who stops her from transforming. Philip then reveals that all the candidates were unknowingly installed with slots for the Alcohol Memory; Kanna used it first, but blacked out and lost her memory, then Koyomi used it to try and kill Kei, but died from alcohol poisoning, after which Kei impaled her body onto the tree and then tried to attack Kurumi, only to also die from poisoning as a result of transforming in the bath. Just as Shotaro and Philip are joined by Tokime and Ryu, the latter of whom has transformed into Kamen Rider Accel, they are confronted by another Dopant wearing an unknown Driver. As Ryu uses his Trial form to fight against this new Dopant, Shotaro and the others head inside the mansion to confront the mastermind behind this incident.
| 9 | "The Closed k / The Ultimate Two Halves of One"; Transliteration: "Tozasareta Kē / Kyūkyoku wa Futari de Hitori" (Japanese: 閉ざされたk / 究極は二人で一人) | September 26, 2022 |
The true mastermind and owner of the Alcohol Memory is revealed to be Kuya's grandmother, Kiku, who had ties with Museum, the evil organization behind the Gaia Memories, and sought to find a suitable wife for Kuya who could inherit the Alcohol Memory. Kiku transforms into the true Alcohol Dopant, possessing powerful telekinetic abilities as a result of what Tokime recognizes as a "High Dope", prompting Shotaro and Philip to transform into Kamen Rider W's most powerful form, Cyclone Joker Xtreme. W manages to destroy the memory quickly without injuring Kiku, but this in turn causes the mansion to self-destruct, taking Kiku and her butler Kimura along with it. Joining up with Ryu, Shotaro and Philip are formally confronted by Bando, who reveals himself as the Aurora Dopant before disappearing along with his comrades, the Scream and Brachiosaurus Dopants. Upon returning to the agency, the two detectives wrap up the case by explaining how Bando had worked alongside Kiku for this experiment, while Kuya becomes determined to make a living on his own.
| 10 | "Superhuman r / A Passport to Shadow Fuuto"; Transliteration: "Chōjin Āru / Ura Fūto e no Pasupōto" (Japanese: 超人r / 裏風都へのパスポート) | October 3, 2022 |
Philip discovers that the broken Memory Tokime carried around with her is a Joker Memory like Shotaro's, suggesting that she used to be a Dopant. To take their minds off of it, Shotaro and Tokime take on a request from schoolgirl Ritsuka Rando to find her grandfather Rentaro, who disappeared after taking on a valve construction job from a mysterious client. As Philip works with Ryu and the police to investigate the case, Tokime gets pulled into Shadow Fuuto after picking up a mysterious card, discovering it to be full of monsters. Using her knowledge of the city, Tokime manages to find her way back to the agency to warn everyone about the danger Rentaro is in, only for the Brachiosaurus Dopant to drag her back in, forcing Shotaro, Philip and Ryu to jump into Shadow Fuuto after her. There, they confront Rentaro's client, Mamoru Nikaido, who transforms into the Reactor Dopant, proving resistant to W and Accel's attacks. Meanwhile, Tokime is confronted by the Brachiosaurus Memory's user, Hideo Chiba, who claims that this is Tokime's home.
| 11 | "Superhuman r / In Search of a Connection"; Transliteration: "Chōjin Āru / Tsunagari o Motomete" (Japanese: 超人r / つながりを求めて) | October 10, 2022 |
Chiba takes away the Silver Visa Tokime picked up and tries to use his powers to subjugate her, but Tokime manages to recall Shotaro's advice about thinking about their client and manages to resist him, allowing her to escape. Meanwhile, W combines Ryu's Beetle Phonewith their Heat Trigger form to deal Nikaido damage, but Nikaido calls forth an army of Road Dopants, using their ability to force W and Ryu out of Shadow Fuuto with seemingly no way to return. After receiving some encouragement from Akiko, Shotaro learns from Ritsuka about a special shrine Rentaro would pray at, which is where they find the prototype valve he built before his disappearance. As Philip manages to determine that the valve's true purpose lies somewhere in regular Fuuto, back in Shadow Fuuto, Tokime comes to Rentaro's aid.
| 12 | "Superhuman r / Death, and..." Transliteration: "Chōjin Āru / Shūen, Soshite......" (Japanese: 超人r / 終焉、そして......) | October 17, 2022 |
After Rentaro learned that the valve he built for Nikaido is actually for a small nuclear reactor, he and Tokime manage to return to the real Fuuto by following Nikaido's goons through another gate. They end up being confronted by Nikaido, who is using the reactor to cool down his body, but are saved by the arrival of Shotaro and Philip, who had deduced his location from the prototype they found, before Ryu arrives to destroy the reactor. As Shotaro and Philip face off against Nikaido in their Xtreme form, Nikaido attempts to use Tokime as a human shield, but W manages to both save her and defeat Nikaido. Although the Reactor Memory is broken, Nikaido uses the last of his strength to eliminate his goons before the Kamen Riders can retrieve a Shadow Fuuto Visa from them. Later, Philip is able to confirm that the broken Joker Memory has not been used by Tokime before explaining everything he has learned about Bando, including his involvement with Foundation X. As Tokime asks to be told everything about Kamen Riders, Gaia Memories and Museum to better understand her connection with Shadow Fuuto, Shotaro tells her about "Begins Night", the fateful night when he first met Philip and became Kamen Rider W.
