= List of Fuuto Pi chapters =

Japanese manga series chapters

Taking place two years after the Kamen Rider W TV series' finale, Fuuto PI sees the return of Shotaro Hidari, a private detective who works at Narumi Detective Agency, and his partner Raito "Philip" Sonozaki, the sole survivor of the Sonozaki family who can access the Gaia Library as research for Shotaro's work. Together they transform into the superhero Kamen Rider W, who protects the city of Fuuto from Dopants, monsters created by items called Gaia Memories.

Written by Riku Sanjo and illustrated by Masaki Sato, Fuuto PI started in Shogakukan's seinen manga magazine Big Comic Spirits on August 7, 2017. In January 2024, it was announced that the manga had entered its "last stage" and took a break in February before starting a new story arc in April. It took another hiatus in February 2025. Shogakukan has collected its chapters into individual tankōbon volumes. The first volume was released on March 30, 2018. As of May 29, 2026, twenty volumes have been released.

== Volume list ==
No.	Release date	ISBN
1	March 30, 2018	978-4-09-189849-4
1. "Be Wary of the t (1)/The Man Who Fell in Love With a Witch" (tに気をつけろ 1 / 魔女に恋した男, Tī ni Ki o Tsukero Ichi/Majo ni Koi Shita Otoko); 2. "Be Wary of the t (2)/His Partner Is the Devil" (tに気をつけろ 2 / 相棒は魔少年, Tī ni Ki o Tsukero Ni/Aibō wa Ma Shōnen); 3. "Be Wary of the t (3)/The City's Trump Card" (tに気をつけろ 3 / 街の切り札, Tī ni Ki o Tsukero San/Machi no Kirifuda); 4. "Be Wary of the t (4)/The Half-Boiled's Pride" (tに気をつけろ 4 / 半熟の意地, Tī ni Ki o Tsukero Yon/Hanjuku no Iji); 5. "Be Wary of the t (5)/The Criminal Is There" (tに気をつけろ 5 / 犯人(ヤツ)はそこにいる, Tī ni Ki o Tsukero Go/Yatsu wa Soko ni Iru); 6. "Be Wary of the t (6)/The Masked Guardian" (tに気をつけろ 6 / 仮面の守護神, Tī ni Ki o Tsukero Roku/Kamen no Shugoshin); 7. "Be Wary of the t (7)/Resolving the Request" (tに気をつけろ 7 / 依頼の決着, Tī ni Ki o Tsukero Nana/Irai no Ketchaku); 8. "Be Wary of the t (+α)/The Witch Who Settled in" (tに気をつけろ +α / 住み着いた魔女, Tī ni Ki o Tsukero Purasu Arufa/Sumitsuita Majo)
Detective Shotaro Hidari continues protecting the town of Fuuto and receives a request from a citizen named Tsubokazi Chuuta who is searching for a "witch" named Tokime who took his bag. When finding her, Tokime easily escapes as she somehow changes the location the detective causing him to meet police officers who inform him of recent murders and realizes that he was instead sent to another city thanks to her. As an unknown threat comes, Shotaro's partner assists Shotaro in exploring how Tokime is able to transport to other areas using items known as Gaia Memories and is related to Fuuto's murders. After meeting Tokime again, Shotaro deduces that the witch is not a threat but instead an amnesiac woman lost between the two Fuuto Cities. Shotaro learns the murderer is related with the yakuza who transforms into a machine with Gaia Memories forcing Philip to fuse with Shotaro to become the hero Kamen Rider Double. Following the yakuza's arrest after combat, Shotaro has Chuuta who has been using the Gaia Memory and is arrested by their policeman Ryu. After Tokime tries redeem for her crimes, she decides to become Shotaro's partner, having become attached to him.
2	March 30, 2018	978-4-09-189850-0
9. "The Worst m (1)/Valkyrie's Bodyguard" (最悪のm 1 / 戦姫のボディーガード, Saiaku no Emu Ichi/Senki no Bodīgādo); 10. "The Worst m (2)/The Buzz Which Calls Death" (最悪のm 2 / 死を呼ぶ羽音, Saiaku no Emu Ni/Shi o Yobu Haoto); 11. "The Worst m (3)/The Threat Descended" (最悪のm 3 / 降ってきた脅威, Saiaku no Emu San/Futtekita Kyōi); 12. "The Worst m (4)/Informant" (最悪のm 4 / 密告者, Saiaku no Emu Yon/Mikkokusha); 13. "The Worst m (5)/Philip's Conclusion" (最悪のm 5 / フィリップの結論, Saiaku no Emu Go/Firippu no Ketsuron); 14. "The Worst m (6)/White Fangs" (最悪のm 6 / 白い牙, Saiaku no Emu Roku/Shiroi Kiba); 15. "The Worst m (7)/Game Over" (最悪のm 7 / ゲームオーバー, Saiaku no Emu Nana/Gēmu Ōbā); 16. "Where Is the c? (1)/The Cat-Finding Expert" (cは何処に 1 / 猫探しの天才, Shī wa Izuko ni Ichi/Neko Sagashi no Tensai); 17. "Where Is the c? (2)/Call of the Beast" (cは何処に 2 / 獣の呼ぶ声, Shī wa Izuko ni Ni/Kemono no Yobu Koe); 18. "Where Is the c? (3)/Where Chao Belongs" (cは何処に 3 / チャオの居場所, Shī wa Izuko ni San/Chao no Ibasho)
Narumi Detective Agency is hired by games company Max Soft to bodyguard Monako Moriguchi, the main programmer for the game Monster El Dorado who, unknown to the public, is also the game's idol Megu Kazamatsuri, after Megu receives death threats from someone known as "m". A Meganeura Dopant, who seeks vengeance against Megu. Although Kamen Rider W steps in to fight against it, a wounded Shotaro entrusts Tokime and the others to continue protecting Monako. Meanwhile, a man named Yukiji Bando appears before Murder, inviting him to a city of some kind before they are forced to flee his apartment following a tip-off about Ryu's raid. Tokime and Majima discover that one of Monako's makeup artists, Midori Koizumi, is the informant leaking information to Murder, learning that she had just told him about Megu's true identity. Using a power-up drug he received from Bando, Murder launches an attack on Monako. Tokime rushes in to stop Murder from escaping with Monako before Philip catches up to them as defeats Murder. Following the incident, Monako's manager Majima, who had been fighting against management for their poor treatment of Monako, leaves the company to form his own game studio, with Monako deciding to go along with him. The last chapters involve the Agency finding a missing cat and discovering its connection with Dopant.
3	June 29, 2018	978-4-09-189890-6
19. "The Closed k (1)/The Dynamic Duo's Disaster" (閉ざされたk 1 / 名コンビ遭難, Tozasareta Kē Ichi/Mei Konbi Sōnan); 20. "The Closed k (2)/Masked Nights" (閉ざされたk 2 / 仮面の夜を重ねて, Tozasareta Kē Ni/Kamen no Yoru o Kasanete); 21. "The Closed k (3)/Drunken Devil" (閉ざされたk 3 / 泥酔した悪魔, Tozasareta Kē San/Deisui Shita Akuma); 22. "The Closed k (4)/Serial Murder" (閉ざされたk 4 / 連続殺人, Tozasareta Kē Yon/Renzoku Satsujin); 23. "The Closed k (5)/Chain of Malice" (閉ざされたk 5 / 連鎖する悪意, Tozasareta Kē Go/Rensa Suru Akui); 24. "The Closed k (6)/Crimson Reinforcements" (閉ざされたk 6 / 真紅の援軍, Tozasareta Kē Roku/Shinku no Engun); 25. "The Closed k (7)/Frightening Truth" (閉ざされたk 7 / おそるべき真実, Tozasareta Kē Nana/Osorubeki Shinjitsu); 26. "The Closed k (8)/Ultimate Two in One" (閉ざされたk 8 / 究極は二人で一人, Tozasareta Kē Hachi/Kyūkyoku wa Futari de Hitori); 27. "The Closed k (9)/Until the Day We Make a Toast" (閉ざされたk 9 / いつの日か君と乾杯を, Tozasareta Kē Kyū/Itsu no Hi ka Kimi to Kanpai o)
Shotaro and Philip get lost in a blizzard and are rescued by a woman, Kanna Kubokura, who brings them to a mansion. Its owner, Kuya Kagamino, has four potential brides, Kanna included, must try to appeal to him without letting their identities be found out. Shotaro discovers one of the candidates, Koyomi Zaizen, impaled on a tree before he and Philip encounter a Dopant. Kei becomes the next victim after Kurumi discovers her dead in the bath. Kurumi, revealed to be in possession of the Alcohol Memory, attempts to stop Kanna from leaving the mansion, only for it to actually be Philip in disguise. He claims candidates were unknowingly installed with slots for the Alcohol Memory; Kanna used it first, but blacked out and lost her memory, then Koyomi used it to try and kill Kei, but died from alcohol poisoning, after which Kei impaled her body onto the tree and then tried to attack Kurumi, only to also die from poisoning. They are confronted by another Dopant. The true mastermind and owner of the Alcohol Memory is revealed to be Kuya's grandmother, Kiku, who had ties with Museum, the evil organization behind the Gaia Memories, and sought to find a suitable wife for Kuya who could inherit the Alcohol Memory. Kiku transforms into the true powerful Alcohol Dopant, prompting Shotaro and Philip to destroy it without injuring Kiku, but this in turn causes the mansion to self-destruct, taking Kiku and her butler Kimura along with it. Shotaro and Philip are formally confronted by Bando, who reveals himself as the Aurora Dopant before disappearing.
4	October 30, 2018	978-4-09-860075-5
28. "The p Is a Devil (1)/The Wandering Right Arm" (pは悪魔だ 1 / 彷徨う右腕, Pī wa Akuma da Ichi/Samayō Migiude); 29. "The p Is a Devil (2)/Comrade Gathering" (pは悪魔だ 2 / 仲間たちは集う, Pī wa Akuma da Ni/Nakama-tachi wa Tsudō); 30. "The p Is a Devil (3)/Secret Maneuvers of the Hand of Evil" (pは悪魔だ 3 / 暗躍する魔手, Pī wa Akuma da San/An'yaku Suru Mashu); 31. "The p Is a Devil (4)/Mysterious Puzzle" (pは悪魔だ 4 / 不可思議なパズル, Pī wa Akuma da Yon/Fukashigi na Pazuru); 32. "The p Is a Devil (5)/The Identity of the Devil" (pは悪魔だ 5 / 幻惑者の正体, Pī wa Akuma da Go/Genwakusha no Shōtai); 33. "The p Is a Devil (6)/City of Gods" (pは悪魔だ 6 / 神々の街, Pī wa Akuma da Roku/Kamigami no Machi); 34. "The p Is a Devil (7)/Evil Hidden in the Darkness" (pは悪魔だ 7 / 闇にひそむ悪意, Pī wa Akuma da Nana/Yami ni Hisomu Akui); 35. "The p Is a Devil (8)/A Ruthless Trap" (pは悪魔だ 8 / 非情な罠, Pī wa Akuma da Hachi/Hijō na Wana); 36. "The p Is a Devil (9)/Joker on the Left" (pは悪魔だ 9 / 切り札(ジョーカー)は左, Pī wa Akuma da Kyū/Jōkā wa Hidari); 37. "The p Is a Devil (+α)/The City Is Still Alive" (pは悪魔だ +α / それでも街は生きている, Pī wa Akuma da Purasu Arufa/Soredemo Machi wa Ikiteiru)
5	February 28, 2019	978-4-09-860225-4; 978-4-09-943037-5 (SE)
38. "The Superman r (1)/The Ultimate Part" (超人r 1 / 究極の部品, Chōjin Āru Ichi/Kyūkyoku no Buhin); 39. "The Superman r (2)/Passport to the Back Futo" (超人r 2 / 裏風都へのパスポート, Chōjin Āru Ni/Ura Fūto e no Pasupōto); 40. "The Superman r (3)/The Guardian of the Dark City" (超人r 3 / 黒き街の番人, Chōjin Āru San/Kuroki Machi no Ban'nin); 41. "The Superman r (4)/Evil Heat vs. Superhigh Heat" (超人r 4 / 凶熱 対 超熱, Chōjin Āru Yon/Kyōnetsu Tai Chōnetsu); 42. "The Superman r (5)/Hell's Army" (超人r 5 / 地獄の軍団, Chōjin Āru Go/Jigoku no Gundan); 43. "The Superman r (6)/Seeking Anything Relevant" (超人r 6 / つながりを求めて, Chōjin Āru Roku/Tsunagari o Motomete); 44. "The Superman r (7)/Escape from the City of Beasts" (超人r 7 / 魔獣都市脱出, Chōjin Āru Nana/Majū Toshi Dasshutsu); 45. "The Superman r (8)/That Man, Being High Heat" (超人r 8 / その男、高熱につき, Chōjin Āru Hachi/Sono Otoko, Kōnetsu ni Tsuki); 46. "The Superman r (9)/Demise, and......" (超人r 9 / 終焉、そして......, Chōjin Āru Kyū/Shūen, Soshite......)
6	June 28, 2019	978-4-09-860318-3
47. "The Portrait of the s (1)/The Fool Comes Knocking on the Door Twice" (sの肖像 1 / 馬鹿は二度ドアを叩く, Esu no Shōzō Ichi/Baka wa Nido Doa o Tataku); 48. "The Portrait of the s (2)/Our City" (sの肖像 2 / 俺たちの街, Esu no Shōzō Ni/Ore-tachi no Machi); 49. "The Portrait of the s (3)/The Revival of the Skeleton" (sの肖像 3 / 蘇る骸骨, Esu no Shōzō San/Yomigaeru Gaikotsu); 50. "The Portrait of the s (4)/Begins Night" (sの肖像 4 / 始まりの夜(ビギンズナイト), Esu no Shōzō Yon/Biginzu Naito); 51. "The Portrait of the s (5)/The Half-Man's Bitter Regret" (sの肖像 5 / 半人前の痛恨, Esu no Shōzō Go/Han'ninmae no Tsūkon); 52. "The Portrait of the s (6)/The Devil" (sの肖像 6 / 悪魔野郎, Esu no Shōzō Roku/Akuma Yarō); 53. "The Portrait of the s (7)/A Man That It Looks Good on" (sの肖像 7 / 似合う男, Esu no Shōzō Nana/Niau Otoko); 54. "The Portrait of the s (8)/The Birth of W" (sの肖像 8 / W誕生, Esu no Shōzō Hachi/Daburu Tanjō); 55. "The Portrait of the s (9)/Worst and Best" (sの肖像 9 / 最悪と最高, Esu no Shōzō Kyū/Saiaku to Saikō)
7	November 29, 2019	978-4-09-860488-3
56. "Darkness Is the o's Nest (1)/Don't Ask Him Questions" (闇はoの巣 1 / 彼に質問をするな, Yami wa Ō no Su Ichi/Kare ni Shitsumon o Suru na); 57. "Darkness Is the o's Nest (2)/A Bizarre Blade" (闇はoの巣 2 / 猟奇的な刃, Yami wa Ō no Su Ni/Ryōkiteki na Yaiba); 58. "Darkness Is the o's Nest (3)/A Freezing Nightmare" (闇はoの巣 3 / 凍れる悪夢, Yami wa Ō no Su San/Kōreru Akumu); 59. "Darkness Is the o's Nest (4)/A Volatile Situation" (闇はoの巣 4 / 一触即発, Yami wa Ō no Su Yon/Isshokusokuhatsu); 60. "Darkness Is the o's Nest (5)/An Invisible Slash" (闇はoの巣 5 / 見えざる斬撃, Yami wa Ō no Su Go/Miezaru Zangeki); 61. "Darkness Is the o's Nest (6)/Pursue the Murderer" (闇はoの巣 6 / 殺人鬼を追え, Yami wa Ō no Su Roku/Satsujinki o Oe); 62. "Darkness Is the o's Nest (7)/Chills That Won't Go Away" (闇はoの巣 7 / 消せない悪寒, Yami wa Ō no Su Nana/Kesenai Okan); 63. "Darkness Is the o's Nest (8)/A Monster Creates a Monster" (闇はoの巣 8 / 怪物は怪物を生む, Yami wa Ō no Su Hachi/Kaibutsu wa Kaibutsu o Umu); 64. "Darkness Is the o's Nest (9)/I Won't Die" (闇はoの巣 9 / 俺は死なない, Yami wa Ō no Su Kyū/Ore wa Shinanai); 65. "Darkness Is the o's Nest (10)/Footsteps of Further Darkness" (闇はoの巣 10 / さらなる闇の足音, Yami wa Ō no Su Jū/Saranaru Yami no Ashioto)
8	March 30, 2020	978-4-09-860567-5
66. "The b's Tresure (1)/The Sunset Thief" (bたちの宝物 1 / 夕陽泥棒, Bī-tachi no Takaramono Ichi/Yūhi Dorobō); 67. "The b's Tresure (2)/The Bayside Individuals Who Never Change" (bたちの宝物 2 / ベイサイドの懲りない面々, Bī-tachi no Takaramono Ni/Beisaido no Korinai Menmen); 68. "The b's Tresure (3)/A Phantom Appears" (bたちの宝物 3 / 幽鬼出現, Bī-tachi no Takaramono San/Yūki Shutsugen); 69. "The b's Tresure (4)/Upset" (bたちの宝物 4 / 動揺, Bī-tachi no Takaramono Yon/Dōyō); 70. "The b's Tresure (5)/The Bonds of the Haunt of Outcasts" (bたちの宝物 5 / ふきだまりの絆, Bī-tachi no Takaramono Go/Fukidamari no Kizuna); 71. "The b's Tresure (6)/Angry Trash" (bたちの宝物 6 / 怒れる廃棄品, Bī-tachi no Takaramono Roku/Ikareru Haikihin); 72. "The b's Tresure (7)/Taint vs. Radiance" (bたちの宝物 7 / 汚れvs.輝き, Bī-tachi no Takaramono Nana/Kegare Bāsasu Kagayaki); 73. "The b's Tresure (8)/The Incineration of Sins" (bたちの宝物 8 / 罪の焼却, Bī-tachi no Takaramono Hachi/Tsumi no Shōkyaku); 74. "The b's Tresure (9)/The Reason Why We're Here" (bたちの宝物 9 / ぼくらがここにいる理由, Bī-tachi no Takaramono Kyū/Boku-ra ga Koko ni Iru Riyū)
9	October 30, 2020	978-4-09-860714-3
75. "Thanks to the f (1)/The Symbol of Futo" (fに感謝を 1 / 風都のシンボル, Efu ni Kansha o Ichi/Fūto no Shinboru); 76. "Thanks to the f (2)/Suit Actor Tokime" (fに感謝を 2 / スーツアクターときめ, Efu ni Kansha o Ni/Sūtsu Akutā Tokime); 77. "Thanks to the f (3)/The Blue Flame Gang" (fに感謝を 3 / 蒼き炎の群れ, Efu ni Kansha o San/Aoki Honō no Mure); 78. "Thanks to the f (4)/Rat and Lion" (fに感謝を 4 / 鼠と獅子, Efu ni Kansha o Yon/Nezumi to Shishi); 79. "Thanks to the f (5)/Steppingstone" (fに感謝を 5 / 踏み台, Efu ni Kansha o Go/Fumidai); 80. "Thanks to the f (6)/I Know You" (fに感謝を 6 / 私は君を知っている, Efu ni Kansha o Roku/Watashi wa Kimi o Shitteiru); 81. "Thanks to the f (7)/Each One's Thoughts" (fに感謝を 7 / それぞれの想い, Efu ni Kansha o Nana/Sorezore no Omoi); 82. "Thanks to the f (8)/The Night Before the Showdown" (fに感謝を 8 / 決戦前夜, Efu ni Kansha o Hachi/Kessen Zen'ya); 83. "Thanks to the f (9)/The Counterattack Flame" (fに感謝を 9 / 反撃の炎, Efu ni Kansha o Kyū/Hangeki no Honō); 84. "Thanks to the f (10)/Wind, Don't Disappear" (fに感謝を 10 / 風よ消えないで, Efu ni Kansha o Jū/Kaze yo Kienai de)
10	March 30, 2021	978-4-09-860870-6
85. "The Grim Reaper With the Face of the l (1)/An Active Woman" (死神はlの顔 1 / 行動力の女, Shinigami wa Eru no Kao Ichi/Kōdōryoku no On'na); 86. "The Grim Reaper With the Face of the l (2)/Why Does the Dead Person Have a Smile?" (死神はlの顔 2 / 死者は何故笑う, Shinigami wa Eru no Kao Ni/Shisha wa Naze Warau); 87. "The Grim Reaper With the Face of the l (3)/A Weird Demon" (死神はlの顔 3 / 奇怪なる魔人, Shinigami wa Eru no Kao San/Kikai Naru Majin); 88. "The Grim Reaper With the Face of the l (4)/Great Magic" (死神はlの顔 4 / 大魔術, Shinigami wa Eru no Kao Yon/Daimajutsu); 89. "The Grim Reaper With the Face of the l (5)/Stop the Tragedy" (死神はlの顔 5 / 惨劇を止めろ, Shinigami wa Eru no Kao Go/Sangeki o Tomero); 90. "The Grim Reaper With the Face of the l (6)/The Night in Round Barrel Island" (死神はlの顔 6 / ロンドバレル島の夜, Shinigami wa Eru no Kao Roku/Rondo Bareru-tō no Yoru); 91. "The Grim Reaper With the Face of the l (7)/The Identity of the Memory" (死神はlの顔 7 / メモリの正体, Shinigami wa Eru no Kao Nana/Memori no Shōtai); 92. "The Grim Reaper With the Face of the l (8)/The Curse of the Terror" (死神はlの顔 8 / 恐怖(テラー)の呪縛, Shinigami wa Eru no Kao Hachi/Terā no Jubaku); 93. "The Grim Reaper With the Face of the l (9)/Don't Forget to Smile" (死神はlの顔 9 / 笑顔を忘れない, Shinigami wa Eru no Kao Kyū/Egao o Wasurenai)
11	August 30, 2021	978-4-09-861128-7
94. "The Maverick d (1)/Tokime Kidnapped" (異端児d 1 / ときめ誘拐, Itanji Dī Ichi/Tokime Yūkai); 95. "The Maverick d (2)/The Lost Beach" (異端児d 2 / 失われたビーチ, Itanji Dī Ni/Ushinawareta Bīchi); 96. "The Maverick d (3)/The Eccentric Who Hides in the Ground" (異端児d 3 / 地に潜む奇人, Itanji Dī San/Chi ni Hisomu Kijin); 97. "The Maverick d (4)/Monster Confrontation" (異端児d 4 / 怪物対決, Itanji Dī Yon/Kaibutsu Taiketsu); 98. "The Maverick d (5)/Dance With the Devil" (異端児d 5 / 悪魔とのダンス, Itanji Dī Go/Akuma to no Dansu); 99. "The Maverick d (6)/The Eye of a Needle" (異端児d 6 / 針の穴, Itanji Dī Roku/Hari no Ana); 100. "The Maverick d (7)/The Counterattack Fangs" (異端児d 7 / 逆襲の牙, Itanji Dī Nana/Gyakushū no Kiba); 101. "The Maverick d (8)/A Roar That Cleaves the Earth" (異端児d 8 / 地を裂く咆哮, Itanji Dī Hachi/Chi o Saku Hōkō); 102. "The Maverick d (9)/End" (異端児d 9 / 末路, Itanji Dī Kyū/Matsuro)
12	February 28, 2022	978-4-09-861252-9
103. "The h of the Maze Building (1)/Ripper" (迷路棟のh 1 / 切り裂き魔, Meirotō no Eichi Ichi/Kirisakima); 104. "The h of the Maze Building (2)/My Friend Is a Genius" (迷路棟のh 2 / 我が友、天才児, Meirotō no Eichi Ni/Waga Tomo, Tensaiji); 105. "The h of the Maze Building (3)/Ghost Doctor" (迷路棟のh 3 / 幽霊博士, Meirotō no Eichi San/Yūrei Hakase); 106. "The h of the Maze Building (4)/The Shadow of the Foundation" (迷路棟のh 4 / 財団の影, Meirotō no Eichi Yon/Zaidan no Kage); 107. "The h of the Maze Building (5)/Close Friend" (迷路棟のh 5 / 親友, Meirotō no Eichi Go/Shin'yū); 108. "The h of the Maze Building (6)/The Truth of the Curse" (迷路棟のh 6 / 呪いの正体, Meirotō no Eichi Roku/Noroi no Shōtai); 109. "The h of the Maze Building (7)/Blades That Cut Through Space" (迷路棟のh 7 / 空を斬る刃, Meirotō no Eichi Nana/Kū o Kiru Yaiba); 110. "The h of the Maze Building (8)/Along Goodbye" (迷路棟のh 8 / アロング・グッドバイ, Meirotō no Eichi Hachi/Arongu Guddobai)
13	August 30, 2022	978-4-09-861397-7
111. "The Deadly g (1)/The Women of the Special Research Institute" (gが死へ招く 1 / 特殊研の女たち, Jī ga Shi e Maneku Ichi/Tokushuken no On'na-tachi); 112. "The Deadly g (2)/Her Way of Killing" (gが死へ招く 2 / アイツの殺し方, Jī ga Shi e Maneku Ni/Aitsu no Koroshikata); 113. "The Deadly g (3)/Vortex of Suspicion" (gが死へ招く 3 / 疑惑の渦, Jī ga Shi e Maneku San/Giwaku no Uzu); 114. "The Deadly g (4)/That Day Has Come" (gが死へ招く 4 / その日が来た, Jī ga Shi e Maneku Yon/Sono Hi ga Kita); 115. "The Deadly g (5)/The Revelation of a Traitor" (gが死へ招く 5 / 内通者発覚, Jī ga Shi e Maneku Go/Naitsūsha Hakkaku); 116. "The Deadly g (6)/Ryu Terui Dies" (gが死へ招く 6 / 照井 竜死す, Jī ga Shi e Maneku Roku/Terui Ryū Shisu); 117. "The Deadly g (7)/Hellfire" (gが死へ招く 7 / 地獄の炎, Jī ga Shi e Maneku Nana/Jigoku no Honō); 118. "The Deadly g (8)/So I Won't Die" (gが死へ招く 8 / だから俺は死なない, Jī ga Shi e Maneku Hachi/Dakara Ore wa Shinanai)
14	April 28, 2023	978-4-09-861692-3
119. "The y Den (1)/Tokime's Request" (yの魔窟 1 / ときめの願い, Wai no Makutsu Ichi/Tokime no Negai); 120. "The y Den (2)/Pursuers" (yの魔窟 2 / 追跡者たち, Wai no Makutsu Ni/Tsuisekisha-tachi); 121. "The y Den (3)/Spring of Rest" (yの魔窟 3 / 安らぎの泉, Wai no Makutsu San/Yasuragi no Izumi); 122. "The y Den (4)/Death" (yの魔窟 4 / 死神, Wai no Makutsu Yon/Shinigami); 123. "The y Den (5)/Call of the Memory" (yの魔窟 5 / メモリが呼ぶ声, Wai no Makutsu Go/Memori ga Yobu Koe); 124. "The y Den (6)/Tokime and Kazuha" (yの魔窟 6 / ときめと一葉, Wai no Makutsu Roku/Tokime to Kazuha); 125. "The y Den (7)/Tears" (yの魔窟 7 / 涙, Wai no Makutsu Nana/Namida); 126. "The y Den (8)/The Witch Returns" (yの魔窟 8 / 魔女復活, Wai no Makutsu Hachi/Majo Fukkatsu); 127. "The y Den (9)/Farewell, Assistant Detective" (yの魔窟 9 / さよなら探偵助手, Wai no Makutsu Kyū/Sayonara Tantei Joshu)
15	November 30, 2023	978-4-09-862645-8
128. "i, Once Again (1)/Hole in His Heart" (iよ もう一度 1 / 胸の風穴, Ai yo Mō Ichido Ichi/Mune no Kazaana); 129. "i, Once Again (2)/Friends' Intentions" (iよ もう一度 2 / 仲間たちの思惑, Ai yo Mō Ichido Ni/Nakama-tachi no Omowaku); 130. "i, Once Again (3)/Attack of Hunger" (iよ もう一度 3 / 襲い来る飢餓, Ai yo Mō Ichido San/Osoikuru Kiga); 131. "i, Once Again (4)/In Peril" (iよ もう一度 4 / そこにある危機, Ai yo Mō Ichido Yon/Soko ni Aru Kiki); 132. "i, Once Again (5)/Dark Side of the Arcade" (iよ もう一度 5 / 横丁の影, Ai yo Mō Ichido Go/Yokochō no Kage); 133. "i, Once Again (6)/Cause of Hunger" (iよ もう一度 6 / 飢えの正体, Ai yo Mō Ichido Roku/Ue no Shōtai); 134. "i, Once Again (7)/Irregular Case" (iよ もう一度 7 / イレギュラーケース, Ai yo Mō Ichido Nana/Iregyurā Kēsu); 135. "i, Once Again (8)/Surprise for Shotaro" (iよ もう一度 8 / 翔太郎へのサプライズ, Ai yo Mō Ichido Hachi/Shōtarō e no Sapuraizu)
16	April 30, 2024	978-4-09-862762-2
136. "My Favorite q (1)/Duo's Crisis" (愛しのq 1 / コンビの危機, Itoshi no Kyū Ichi/Konbi no Kiki); 137. "My Favorite q (2)/Game Master" (愛しのq 2 / ゲームマスター, Itoshi no Kyū Ni/Gēmu Masutā); 138. "My Favorite q (3)/Beast Lawless Zone" (愛しのq 3 / 魔獣無法地帯, Itoshi no Kyū San/Majū Muhō Chitai); 139. "My Favorite q (4)/Black Saviour" (愛しのq 4 / 黒い救世主, Itoshi no Kyū Yon/Kuroi Kyūseishu); 140. "My Favorite q (5)/Partner's Anger" (愛しのq 5 / 相棒の怒り, Itoshi no Kyū Go/Aibō no Ikari); 141. "My Favorite q (6)/Last Stage" (愛しのq 6 / ラストステージ, Itoshi no Kyū Roku/Rasuto Sutēji); 142. "My Favorite q (7)/Reversal Move" (愛しのq 7 / 逆転の一手, Itoshi no Kyū Nana/Gyakuten no Itte); 143. "My Favorite q (8)/Always Only You" (愛しのq 8 / いつだってキミだけ, Itoshi no Kyū Hachi/Itsu datte Kimi dake)
17	October 30, 2024	978-4-09-863069-1
144. "Afterimage of the x (1)/Tokime's Begins Night" (xの残影 1 / ときめのビギンズナイト, Ekkusu no Zan'ei Ichi/Tokime no Biginzu Naito); 145. "Afterimage of the x (2)/City of Illusions" (xの残影 2 / 幻影都市, Ekkusu no Zan'ei Ni/Gen'ei Toshi); 146. "Afterimage of the x (3)/Eternal Aftermath" (xの残影 3 / 永遠の爪痕, Ekkusu no Zan'ei San/Eien no Tsumeato); 147. "Afterimage of the x (4)/Birth of Shadow Fuuto" (xの残影 4 / 裏風都誕生, Ekkusu no Zan'ei Yon/Ura Fūto Tanjō); 148. "Afterimage of the x (5)/Taboo" (xの残影 5 / 禁忌, Ekkusu no Zan'ei Go/Kinki); 149. "Afterimage of the x (6)/Bloody Witch" (xの残影 6 / 血塗られた魔女, Ekkusu no Zan'ei Roku/Chinurareta Majo); 150. "Afterimage of the x (7)/Joker's Rage" (xの残影 7 / ジョーカーの怒り, Ekkusu no Zan'ei Nana/Jōkā no Ikari); 151. "Afterimage of the x (8)/The Man Who Loved a Witch" (xの残影 8 / 魔女を愛した男, Ekkusu no Zan'ei Hachi/Majo o Ai Shita Otoko)
18	March 28, 2025	978-4-09-863219-0
152. "Welcome to the u (1)/The Legendary Unohana-sō" (ようこそuへ 1 / 伝説の卯ノ花荘, Yōkoso Yū e Ichi/Densetsu no Unohana-sō); 153. "Welcome to the u (2)/Night of the Eccentrics" (ようこそuへ 2 / 奇人たちの夜, Yōkoso Yū e Ni/Kijin-tachi no Yoru); 154. "Welcome to the u (3)/The Shining Demon" (ようこそuへ 3 / 光る魔物, Yōkoso Yū e San/Hikaru Mamono); 155. "Welcome to the u (4)/Deepening Doubt" (ようこそuへ 4 / 深まる疑念, Yōkoso Yū e Yon/Fukamaru Ginen); 156. "Welcome to the u (5)/Confinement" (ようこそuへ 5 / 監禁, Yōkoso Yū e Go/Kankin); 157. "Welcome to the u (6)/Goodbye, Smile" (ようこそuへ 6 / 微笑みよ さようなら, Yōkoso Yū e Roku/Hohoemi yo Sayōnara); 158. "Welcome to the u (7)/Accel Returns" (ようこそuへ 7 / 復活のアクセル, Yōkoso Yū e Nana/Fukkatsu no Akuseru); 159. "Welcome to the u (8)/For That Day" (ようこそuへ 8 / その日のために, Yōkoso Yū e Hachi/Sono Hi no Tame ni)
19	October 30, 2025	978-4-09-863621-1
169. "The n from the Dark (1)/Unexpected Client" (nは暗闇より出でて 1 / まさかの依頼人, Enu wa Kurayami yori Idete Ichi/Masaka no Irainin); 170. "The n from the Dark (2)/The Detective and the Ghost" (nは暗闇より出でて 2 / 探偵と幽霊, Enu wa Kurayami yori Idete Ni/Tantei to Yūrei); 171. "The n from the Dark (3)/Nasty Wind" (nは暗闇より出でて 3 / 嫌な風, Enu wa Kurayami yori Idete San/Iya na Kaze); 172. "The n from the Dark (4)/Necromancer" (nは暗闇より出でて 4 / 死人使い, Enu wa Kurayami yori Idete Yon/Shibito Tsukai); 173. "The n from the Dark (5)/Kirihiko's Conflict" (nは暗闇より出でて 5 / 霧彦の葛藤, Enu wa Kurayami yori Idete Go/Kirihiko no Kattō); 165. "The n from the Dark (6)/Small Friendship" (nは暗闇より出でて 6 / 小さな友情, Enu wa Kurayami yori Idete Roku/Chiisana Yūjō); 166. "The n from the Dark (7)/Revival of the Utopia" (nは暗闇より出でて 7 / 蘇る理想郷, Enu wa Kurayami yori Idete Nana/Yomigaeru Risōkyō); 167. "The n from the Dark (8)/Revival of the Wings" (nは暗闇より出でて 8 / 蘇る翼, Enu wa Kurayami yori Idete Hachi/Yomigaeru Tsubasa); 168. "The n from the Dark (9)/Even If This Body Dies" (nは暗闇より出でて 9 / この身が朽ちても, Enu wa Kurayami yori Idete Kyū/Kono Mi ga Kuchitemo)
20	May 29, 2026	978-4-09-863882-6
169. "The Final Plan z (1)/The Stolen City" (最終計画z 1 / 盗まれた街, Saishū Keikaku Zetto Ichi/Nusumareta Machi); 170. "The Final Plan z (2)/The Client Is a Negotiator" (最終計画z 2 / 依頼人は交渉人, Saishū Keikaku Zetto Ni/Irainin wa Kōshōnin); 171. "The Final Plan z (3)/Hell's Bodyguard" (最終計画z 3 / 地獄の用心棒, Saishū Keikaku Zetto San/Jigoku no Yōjinbō); 172. "The Final Plan z (4)/Too Late" (最終計画z 4 / 手遅れ, Saishū Keikaku Zetto Yon/Teokure); 173. "The Final Plan z (5)/Plan to Strike Back" (最終計画z 5 / 逆襲の策, Saishū Keikaku Zetto Go/Gyakushū no Saku); 174. "The Final Plan z (6)/For Whose Sake Do You Explode?" (最終計画z 6 / 誰がために爆ぜる, Saishū Keikaku Zetto Roku/Taga Tame ni Hazeru); 175. "The Final Plan z (7)/Precious Sacrifices" (最終計画z 7 / 尊い犠牲, Saishū Keikaku Zetto Nana/Tōtoi Gisei); 176. "The Final Plan z (8)/The Vengeful Demon" (最終計画z 8 / 復讐の鬼, Saishū Keikaku Zetto Hachi/Fukushū no Oni); 177. "The Final Plan z (9)/The Vanished Fuuto" (最終計画z 9 / 風都消失, Saishū Keikaku Zetto Kyū/Fūto Shōshitsu)

=== Chapters not yet in tankōbon format ===
178. "The a Is the Last Hope (1)/Visitor" (aが最後の希望 1 / 来訪者, Ē ga Saigo no Kibō Ichi/Raihōsha)
179. "The a Is the Last Hope (2)/The Woman from the Foundation" (aが最後の希望 2 / 財団の女, Ē ga Saigo no Kibō Ni/Zaidan no On'na)
180. "The a Is the Last Hope (3)/Immortality" (aが最後の希望 3 / 不老不死, Ē ga Saigo no Kibō San/Furōfushi)
181. "The a Is the Last Hope (4)/Hideo Chiba Cannot Be Killed" (aが最後の希望 4 / 千葉秀夫は殺せない, Ē ga Saigo no Kibō Yon/Chiba Hideo wa Korosenai)
182. "The a Is the Last Hope (5)/Real Devil" (aが最後の希望 5 / 本物の悪魔, Ē ga Saigo no Kibō Go/Honmono no Akuma)
183. "The a Is the Last Hope (6)/The Price" (aが最後の希望 6 / 代償, Ē ga Saigo no Kibō Roku/Daishō)
184. "The a Is the Last Hope (7)/Absolute Knights" (aが最後の希望 7 / 絶対的な騎士, Ē ga Saigo no Kibō Nana/Zettaiteki na Kishi)
185. "The a Is the Last Hope (8)/Enter the Enemy's Fuuto" (aが最後の希望 8 / 敵風都突入, Ē ga Saigo no Kibō Hachi/Teki Fūto Totsunyū)
186. "The a Is the Last Hope (9)/W's Defeat" (aが最後の希望 9 / W敗北, Ē ga Saigo no Kibō Kyū/Daburu Haiboku)
