= Fuuto PI: The Portrait of Kamen Rider Skull =

2024 Japanese film by Yōsuke Kabashima

- Theatrical release poster
- Kanji: 風都探偵 仮面ライダースカルの肖像
- Revised Hepburn: Fūto Tantei: Kamen Raidā Sukaru no Shōzō
- Directed by: Yōsuke Kabashima
- Screenplay by: Tatsuto Higuchi
- Based on: Fuuto PI by Riku Sanjo
- Starring: Yoshimasa Hosoya; Ayumu Murase; Kōki Uchiyama; Kenjirō Tsuda
- Music by: Kōtarō Nakagawa; Shuhei Naruse
- Production company: Studio Kai
- Distributed by: Toei Video
- Release date: November 8, 2024
- Running time: 82 minutes
- Country: Japan
- Language: Japanese
- Box office: US$513,600

Fuuto PI: The Portrait of Kamen Rider Skull (Japanese: 風都探偵 仮面ライダースカルの肖像, Hepburn: Fūto Tantei: Kamen Raidā Sukaru no Shōzō) is a 2024 Japanese anime film directed by Yōsuke Kabashima, written by Tatsuto Higuchi and animated by Studio Kai. The film stars Yoshimasa Hosoya, Ayumu Murase, Kōki Uchiyama, and Kenjirō Tsuda, among others. Based on the manga series Fuuto PI by Riku Sanjo, the film serves as the origin story of detective Shotaro Hidari. Shotaro becomes the protector of the city of Fuuto under his Kamen Rider W persona while working with Sokichi Narumi to rescue a young Philip, who is being used by his family to create monsters known as Dopants.

Kabashima and Sanjo adapted the manga as a theatrical release after Studio Kai had problems with animating Fuuto PI as a television series. Kabashima decided to focus the adaptation on Shotaro's backstory, particularly his growth and interactions with Narumi.

The film was released in Japan by Toei Video on November 8, 2024. It was generally well-received, with critics praising its accessible exploration of Shotaro's backstory and expansion of the series' lore. The film grossed ¥80,114,875 (approximately US$513,600) during its opening weekend.

== Plot ==
In the city of Fuuto, detective Shotaro Hidari explains the origin of his detective career to his assistant Tokime. As a child, Shotaro is at a concert when a monster known as a Dopant tries to kill the singer. Detective Sokichi Narumi appears and defeats the Dopant, gaining Shotaro's admiration. The following day, Shotaro goes to Narumi's office and requests to become his assistant, unaware that Narumi quit his job since the Dopant was his transformed assistant. Still wanting to get his attention, Shotaro goes to make him coffee one night, and sees a Dopant attacking a couple. Shotaro tries to save the couple but is only able to save the woman. Narumi appears and rescues Shotaro with a powerful item, Gaia Memory, while calling himself the fighter Kamen Rider Skull.

Despite being amazed by Shotaro's desire to save Fuuto's civilians, Narumi ignores Shotaro's requests to join him over the following years. A teenager Shotaro vents his frustration in high school fights, but one day, he protects a basketball player by taking a beating in his stead. Finding him more fitting for the position, Narumi tells Shotaro to graduate from high school and gain his aunt's approval to work together.

One day, Shotaro sneaks into Narumi's office and receives a call from an unknown woman, who tells him that Narumi needs a briefcase for a case. Shotaro follows Narumi's friends and finds a ship that takes him to Narumi, who is trying to rescue the Child of Fate who is being used to create Dopants. They split up, and Narumi faces the Dopant Saeko Sonozaki while Shotaro finds the Child of Fate. Disgusted by how the Child of Fate uses his knowledge for creating Dopants, Shotaro abandons him. However, Narumi scolds Shotaro, telling him that everybody from Fuuto should be given chances for atonement, and that the Child of Fate was taken from his parents at a young age. Narumi saves him and names him Philip.

However, Saeko's men find the three and kill Narumi. As Shotaro cries over his mentor's death, Philip realizes his actions have wronged others. Surrounded by enemies, Philip uses the briefcase to merge his and Shotaro's minds through Gaia Memories and become a fighter called Kamen Rider W. W defeats his enemies but is chased by Saeko's follower Nagi Ōshima, who transforms into an octopus-like Dopant. After a long battle, W defeats Ōshima and escapes on Narumi's bike to his hideout.

With the story finished, Shotaro breaks into tears over guilt for Narumi's death, and is comforted by Tokime until he falls asleep. Philip explains that Shotaro's trauma has lasted ever since their fateful meeting. Meanwhile, Shotaro goes to a coffee shop, still trying to make his own coffee, which has the seller reminiscing that he has become similar to his former superior. In a post-credit scene, Shotaro dreams of Narumi ranting that he lacks manners to become a proper adult.

== Voice cast ==
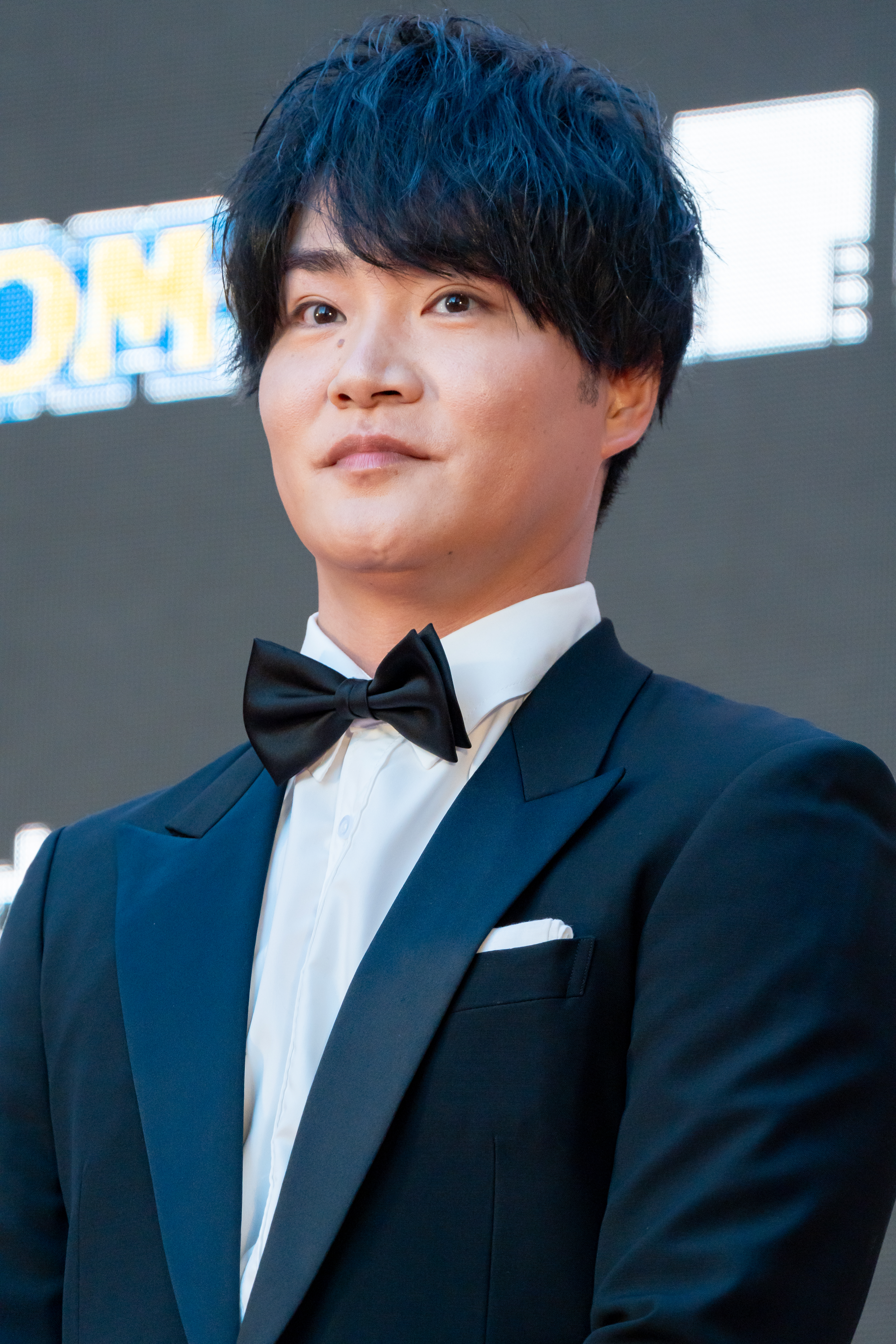
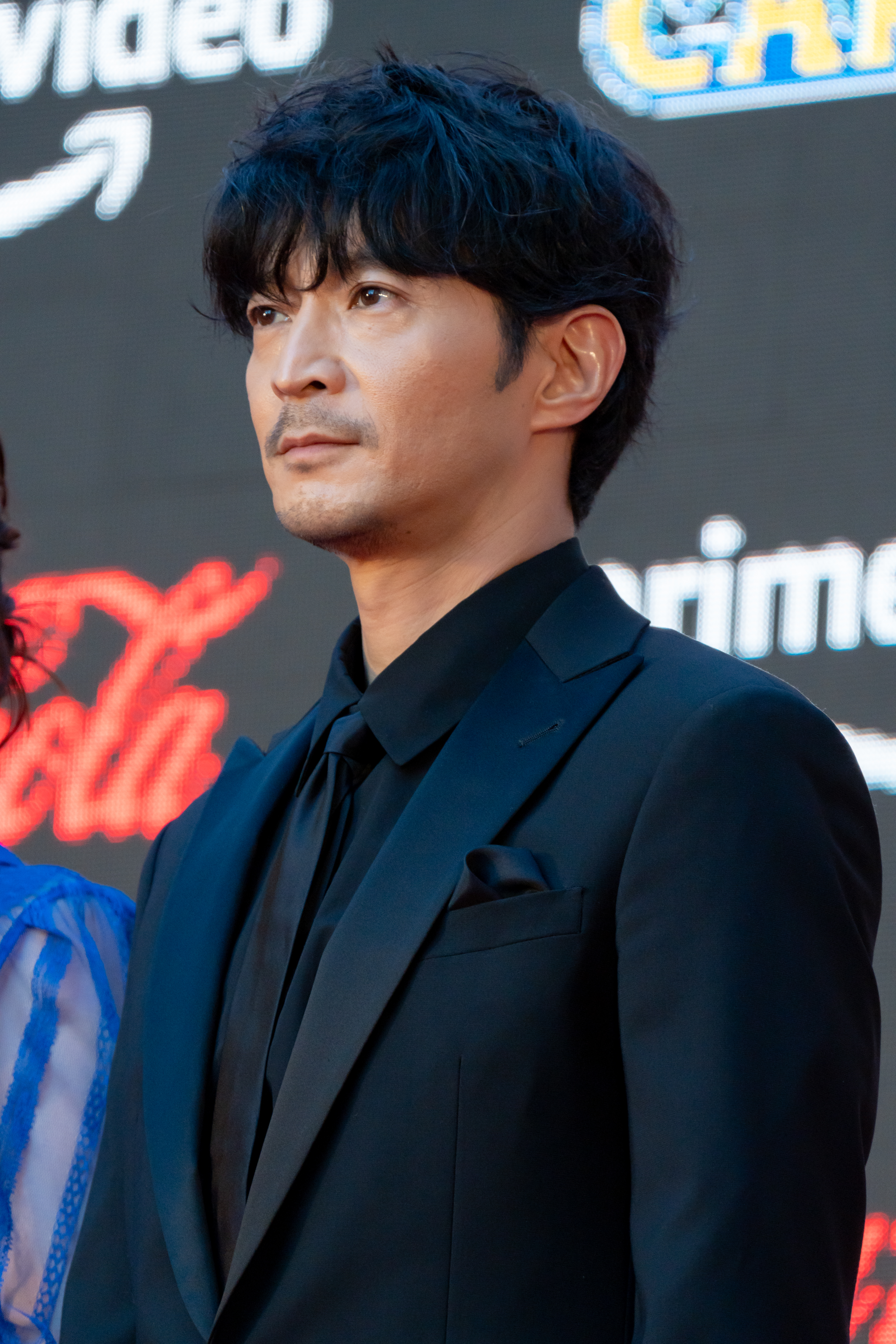
Yoshimasa Hosoya (left) and Kenjiro Tsuda (right) voice Shotaro and Narumi respectively.

Character	Voice actor
Shotaro Hidari	Yoshimasa Hosoya Ayumu Murase (young)
Saeko Sonozaki	Satomi Satō
Nagi Ōshima	Jun Fukuyama
Phillip	Kōki Uchiyama
Sokichi Narumi	Kenjiro Tsuda
Tokime	Akira Sekine
Akiko Narumi	Mikako Komatsu
Ryū Terui	Makoto Furukawa
Yukiji Bandō	Daisuke Ono

== Production ==
=== Adaptation ===
Toei announced the film in June 2024, with the voice cast from Fuuto PI's anime adaptation reprising their roles. Due to the popularity of the anime adaptation, initial plans for the theatrical version involved continuing its story, but scheduling constraints at Studio Kai prevented an immediate continuation. After a discussion between director Yōsuke Kabashima and Studio Kai's production manager, Daisuke Furuya, they agreed that adapting the entire manga series was difficult and opted to adapt each manga volume into their own films or original video animations instead. The production team had initially considered adapting either the fourth manga volume—which featured the Puzzle Dopant, a character absent from the web anime—or the seventh volume, which introduced Kamen Rider Accel. However, the production team decided that featuring Kamen Rider Skull was the most critical element for attracting audience interest, leading to the selection of the sixth volume for adaptation.

Kabashima studied Kamen Rider W: Begins Night to prepare for the production. However, he cut certain aspects he disliked of Kamen Rider W's treatment of Skull's story. Nagi Ōshima was created as an original character for the movie. The director tried to avoid portraying Ōshima as a pitiful character, and instead tell an interesting story about him and Saeko.

=== Development ===
Kabashima praised the performance of the two main actors, stating that they needed minimal guidance. He commended Tsuda's performance as Narumi for his easy-going portrayal and faithfulness to the original live-action television series. Kabashima intended to depict Narumi as a role model for Shotaro and others to look up to.

Shotaro cries in three scenes, which Kabashima felt were crucial to put effort into animating for the sake of appealing emotionally to the audience. In particular, the final scene where Shotaro falls asleep next to Tokime was intended to be deeply moving. He spoke to the animator, Ebinama, and asked him to create a unique visual effect of a film of tears for these scenes. Since it was the first time that the scenes from the original manga were being voiced, Kabashima wanted them to be especially well-done.

Kabashima named Masami Obari as a major directorial influence for his animation choices. He combined 3D animation with 2D animation in several scenes, such as the first time Shotaro enters Narumi's office. While he was pleased with the final result, he felt there was room for improvement in animation quality and direction; in particular, he wanted the animation team to be able to improve and rework scenes on their own. He expressed his desire to strengthen Studio Kai's animation team over the next few years.

=== Voice casting ===
Ayumu Murase, who voiced a young Shotaro, expressed his enjoyment of the dynamic with Kenjiro Tsuda's character, Sokichi Narumi. Similarly, Kabashima named Tsuda's portrayal of Narumi as one of the best parts of the work. Kabashima had been impressed by Kikkawa's portrayal of Narumi in Kamen Rider W: Begins Night, and hoped that Tsuda would also play the character well, particularly what he described as Narumi's cool aspects.

Yoshimasa Hosoya and Kōki Uchiyama, who voiced Shotaro Hidari and Philip respectively, welcomed the announcement of the theatrical anime adaptation. Hosoya found his part relatively straightforward, as the source material was a live-action drama with lines largely consisting of explanatory dialogue and monologues. He described young Shotaro as a "classic anime protagonist" and expressed that tone with an over-the-top delivery style, particularly in comparison to the stoic Philip. Reflecting on his previous performances as Shotaro, he noted that his character's image had already been firmly established when he was first cast in the role.

The antagonist Ōshima was voiced by Jun Fukuyama. Kabashima emphasized Ōshima's ear piercings, gifts from Saeko, as a reflection of his humanity. Satomi Satō, who voiced the secondary antagonist Saeko, was impressed by her character's beauty, especially in the film's ending.

=== Music ===
The film features the theme song "Niau Otoko ni Nare" (似合う男になれ; lit. 'Become a Worthy Man'), written and composed by Kōji Kikkawa and performed as his character Sokichi Narumi, who he played in the original Kamen Rider W series. Kikkawa sought to convey Narumi's perspective when singing the song. As part of this process, he read the script, formed a mental image, and then created lyrics that fit the story. The song's lyrics were intended as a message of encouragement to the young people featured in the film.

For the fight with the Ocean Dopant, the studio initially intended to use the theme song "W-G-X (W Goes Next)" from the web anime, but changed it to "W-B-X (W-Boiled Extreme)" by Aya Kamiki and TAKUYA, the theme song from the original series, to better suit Shotaro and Philip's first battle. The song "Nobody's Perfect" was serendipitously included; Kabashima added the song as a test while editing and felt that it perfectly matched a scene in the film. The soundtrack was released on November 9, 2024, featuring thirty-three tracks composed by Kōtarō Nakagawa and Shuhei Naruse.

== Release ==
The first 20 minutes of the film were exclusively screened at Anime Expo in Los Angeles, California, on July 6, 2024. The film was released in Japan by Toei Video on November 8, 2024.

Following its release, the film took 5th place in the Japanese box office on its opening weekend, earning ¥80,114,875 (approximately US$513,600) in its first three days. The film streamed in Thailand and Hong Kong in the same period. A Blu-ray edition was released on March 12, 2025. On November 13, 2025, the film was licensed by Crunchyroll.

== Reception ==
Critical response to the movie has been generally positive. Christopher Farris of Anime News Network praised the film as appealing to both new and old fans of the franchise, calling it "newbie-friendly" and a "worthy follow-up for [...] the original series". He commended Narumi's complexity as a character, as well as the story's choice to follow Shotaro's perspective up to Narumi's death. Farris saw the production value as a strong component, particularly its animation and music, and concluded by giving the movie an "A-" rating, describing it as "extremely cool all around".

Nick Valdez of ComicBook.com was pleased with the Crunchyroll licensing, opining that it was a strong end to anime in 2025. He wrote that original TV series was a major hit, and appreciated how the new movie explored the series' lore deeper, calling it an "important new piece of the anime franchise's puzzle".

Kirisawa Tae of Square Next was enthused by the movie, remarking that he almost shouted during the screening. He praised the animation and the narrative and Shotaro and Philip's origin story as Kamen Rider W. Tae also found the performances of the lead actors to be a strong aspect of the film. He noted that due to being a self-contained story, the film was accessible to newcomers.

Gizmodo referred to the movie as one of the best streaming films of 2025, praising the origin story involving Shotaro and Philip are given in order to become the Kamen Rider W superhero that was previously shown in Fuuto PI. The writer praised the fight scenes and animation, stating that they might attract viewers to other Kamen Rider works.. Anime News Network also listed the movie as one of the best of the year for mixing the story of Kamen Rider Skull with W, reinvigorating their fondness for the original Kamen Rider W.
