= Shotaro Hidari =

- Kamen Rider W character
- Shotaro as portrayed by Renn Kiriyama
- First appearance: "The W Search/Two Halves of One Detective" (September 6, 2009)
- Created by: Riku Sanjo
- Portrayed by: Renn Kiriyama
- Voiced by: Yoshimasa Hosoya (adult); Ayumu Murase (child)

Shotaro Hidari (Japanese: 左 翔太郎, Hepburn: Hidari Shōtarō) is one of the main characters in the live-action tokusatsu series Kamen Rider W. He is a detective who works with the young Philip, who possesses items called Gaia Memories, to investigate crimes caused by monstrous Dopants in the city of Fuuto. With their Gaia Memories, Shotaro and Philip can transform and combine into the superhero Kamen Rider W (仮面ライダーW, Kamen Raidā Daburu) to fight Dopants. In the sequel series Fuuto PI, Shotaro gains an assistant, Tokime, an amnesiac woman with a mysterious past connected to their enemies.

Shotaro and Philip are the first Kamen Rider composed of two members, and Shotaro's personality and job were inspired by the production team's desire to tell a hard-boiled story. Renn Kiriyama portrayed him in the live-action series, while Yoshimasa Hosoya voiced him for Riku Sanjo's anime sequel Fuuto PI and several video games. Ayumu Murase voiced a young Shotaro in Fuuto PI.

Critical response to Shotaro's character has been generally positive, with critics praising his ability to balance a serious side with lighthearted traits in his role as Kamen Rider W. His relationship with Philip has also been well-received, with reviewers enjoying their dynamic, while his portrayal in Fuuto PI was commended for expanding his backstory and relationships.

== Creation and conception ==
Shotaro's character first appeared in Kamen Rider W, the first show in the Kamen Rider franchise to feature two Kamen Riders as one. Shotaro's partner, Philip, was not intended to be included; the idea was for the protagonist, who would eventually become Shotaro, to be supported by Sokichi Narumi. However, Toei producer Hideaki Tsukada was inspired by the partner characters who often appeared in detective stories to include a "two-in-one" concept.

Shotaro's creation came from the producers' desire to create a "hard-boiled" story. With the exception of scenes at the Sonozaki household, the story is largely told in the first person from Shotaro's perspective. His portrayal was influenced by other detective stories, particularly Shunsaku Kodo from Toei's TV drama Tantei Monogatari. Similar elements between the two works include the protagonist's style and personality, the pairing of a stiff veteran and a rebellious young detective, and even aspects of the setting, like Shotaro's desk. Furthermore, the staff wanted Shotaro and Philip's story to be comedic like Kamen Rider Den-O.

== Portrayals ==
Shotaro Hidari was portrayed in the original live-action series by Renn Kiriyama. Kiriyama had watched Kamen Rider Black since he was a child, and the show had inspired him to become an actor. When auditioning for Kamen Rider W, Kiriyama was asked to do the transformation line for Kamen Rider W at the same time as Philip's actor, Masaki Suda, which initially made him believe Kamen Rider W would be a series with two different Kamen Riders. Throughout the series, he found transformation sequences particularly difficult. He noted his appreciation of how he could still portray Kamen Rider Joker, but was eventually glad to become Kamen Rider W as the narrative moved forward. He was a fan of episode 48 for its emotional impact, such as a scene in which his character fused with Philip for the last time and faced the reality of losing his partner. He needed multiple takes to portray his character crying.

Director Ryuta Tasaki recalled that after a rigorous audition process, Kiriyama and Suda were chosen for the lead roles, and they went to a dinner party to introduce themselves. However, the characters of Shotaro and Philip still had to be developed, and Tasaki told them if they failed, the Kamen Rider series would be over. From then on, their attitudes changed, and they both showed more enthusiasm in their acting. Tasaki felt that the two actors continuously improved from the very first episode. Producer Tsukada told Kiriyama that Shotaro was similar to Hanamichi Sakuragi, the protagonist of the basketball manga Slam Dunk. Upon reading the scripts, Kiriyama understood what Tsukada meant: Shotaro is both a serious protagonist as well as a buffoon who makes mistakes. Kiriyama stated that many of Shotaro's funny moments come from interacting with his superior Akiko Narumi, and practicing with Narumi's actress helped Kiriyama improve his performance in those comedic scenes. He also remarked that Shotaro's detective outfit was particularly unusual.

=== Sequel ===
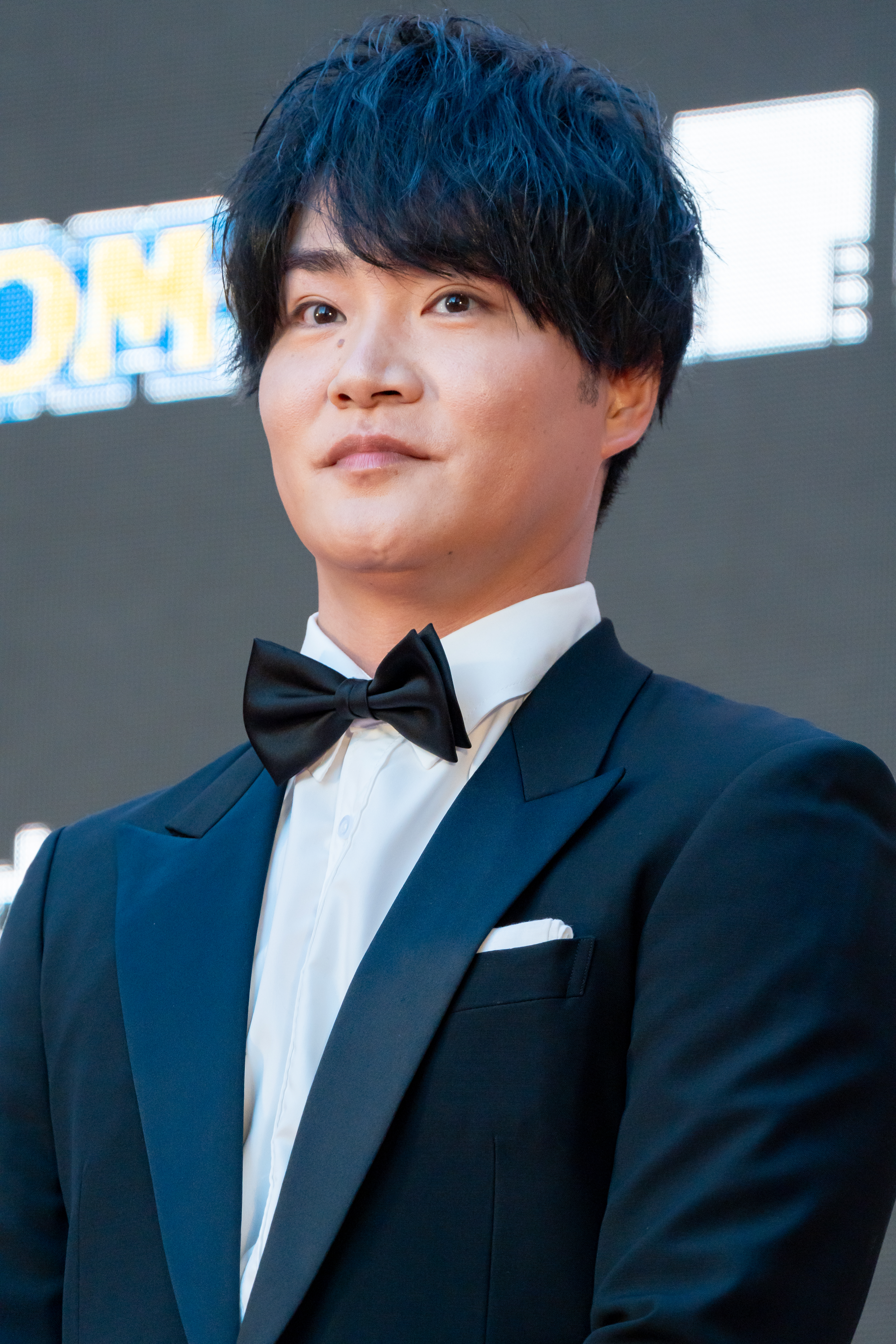
Yoshimasa Hosoya voices Shotaro outside of live-action.

For the manga sequel Fuuto PI, Shotaro and Philip were not permitted to resemble caricatures of their live-action actors due to the publisher's stipulations, which required the producers to create unique character designs. Furthermore, in Kamen Rider W, Philip had served as the narrative's central focus, but in Fuuto PI, Shotaro took on that role. To balance this shift, Sanjo introduced Tokime as Shotaro's new partner. While her dynamic with Shotaro mirrored his original relationship with Philip, Sanjo aimed to develop Tokime into a more human character over time.

The serialization of Fuuto PI led to an extended run and a deeper exploration of the "Begins Night" arc, which delved into Shotaro's origins, particularly his childhood. Director Yosuke Kabashima praised Yoshimasa Hosoya and Koki Uchiyama for their performances as Shotaro and Philip. Hosoya, who reprised his role as Shotaro, expressed particular satisfaction in delivering his transformation line.

For the production of the movie Fuuto PI: The Portrait of Kamen Rider Skull, the director tried to portray Sokichi Narumi, Shotaro's mentor, as a man that everyone would look up to. Shotaro cries in three scenes, including one where Narumi dies, which Kabashima felt were crucial to put effort into animating for the sake of appealing emotionally to the audience. In particular, the final scene where Shotaro falls asleep next to Tokime was intended to be deeply moving. He spoke to the animator, Ebinama, and asked him to create a unique visual effect of a film of tears for these scenes. Since it was the first time that the scenes from the original manga were being voiced, Kabashima wanted them to be especially well-done.

Yoshimasa Hosoya and Kōki Uchiyama, who voiced Shotaro and Philip respectively, welcomed the announcement of the theatrical anime adaptation. Hosoya found his part relatively straightforward, as the source material was a live-action drama with lines largely consisting of explanatory dialogue and monologues. He described Shotaro as a "classic anime protagonist" and expressed that tone with an over-the-top delivery style, particularly in comparison to the stoic Philip. Reflecting on his previous performances as Shotaro, he noted that his character's image had already been firmly established when he was first cast in the role. Ayuma Murase, who voiced a young Shotaro, noted his enjoyment of his dynamic with Kenjiro Tsuda's character, Narumi. For the fight with the Ocean Dopant, the studio initially intended to use the theme song "W-G-X (W Goes Next)" from the web anime, but changed it to "W-B-X (W-Boiled Extreme)" by Aya Kamiki and TAKUYA, the theme song from the original Kamen Rider W series, to better suit Shotaro and Philip's first battle.

== Appearances ==
=== Live action works ===
In Kamen Rider W, Shotaro is a self-proclaimed "hard-boiled private eye" who emulates famous pulp fiction detective characters, dresses in 1940s fashion, and possesses a sharp intuition that allows him to deduce the culprit behind a crime before having Philip provide evidence to confirm his suspicions. Shotaro works to stop the Dopant crime wave in Fuuto by providing his body to Kamen Rider W, taking pride in the role and being called a "Kamen Rider" by the citizens due to the title's meaning of a man who rebels against those who commit evils. While Shotaro did not originally intend to be partnered with Philip due to his body not being able to bear the burden of W's powers or resist paranormal Dopant powers, he adapted to the situation through the strength of his resolve, eventually surpassing his physical limitations to unleash W's full abilities and earning the right to wear his mentor's fedora. Furthermore, he never abandons anyone in need and adheres to his beliefs. As W, Shotaro possesses Gaia Memories with gold-colored connectors called Body Memories (ボディメモリ, Bodi Memori), which form the left half of W's body and determine the fighting style in conjunction with Philip's Soul Memories. Across the TV series, Shotaro and Philip encounter the Sonozaki Family, an aristocratic family based in Fuuto who founded the Museum, a crime syndicate led by Ryubee Sonozaki who sees Fuuto as his personal kingdom and is responsible for the Dopant crimes.

In the prequel film Kamen Rider × Kamen Rider W & Decade: Movie War 2010, a young Shotaro is a protégé of Fuuto private investigator Sokichi Narumi after crossing paths with him and admiring his work. Unlike his mentor, Shotaro is initially incapable of making tough decisions due to his kindhearted nature making him seek to talk down potentially misguided criminals, which leads to others viewing him as "half-boiled". Following Sokichi's death and meeting Philip during the "Begins Night" (ビギンズナイト, Biginzu Naito) incident, Shotaro vows to continue in his mentor's stead while becoming a man "suitable" to wear Sokichi's white fedora, which he considers the symbol of him achieving the mantle and legacy his mentor left for him.

In addition to the Movie War 2010 films, W also has a feature film titled Kamen Rider W Forever: A to Z/The Gaia Memories of Fate. In Kamen Rider × Kamen Rider OOO & W Featuring Skull: Movie War Core, Shotaro's boss Akiko gets married after the events of W and learning more about Narumi. In Kamen Rider × Kamen Rider Fourze & OOO: Movie War Mega Max, Shotaro stops a Foundation X convoy and destroys the monsters guarding it.

=== Fuuto PI media ===
In Fuuto PI, Shotaro encounters an amnesiac pink-haired woman named Tokime who is being targeted by Dopants. After saving her, he and Philip hire her at Narumi Detective Agency as their assistant. As Shotaro and Philip solve more cases, they gradually uncover Tokime's connection with a man, Yukiji Bando, known as Aurora Dopant, and Tokime's past life, along with the true potential of Gaia Memories' next stage used by Dopants in their human forms, dubbed High Dopes. Philip confirms that the broken Joker Memory has not been used by Tokime before explaining everything he has learned about Bando, including his involvement with a group known as Foundation X. Masanari Wada portrayed Shotaro in a stage play of Fuuto PI.

In the anime film Fuuto PI: The Portrait of Kamen Rider Skull, Tokime asks to be told everything about Kamen Riders, Gaia Memories, and Museum to better understand her connection with Shadow Fuuto. Shotaro tells her about "Begins Night", the first time he transformed into Kamen Rider W and the day he lost his mentor. Although Shotaro opens up to Tokime, he still suffers guilt and trauma over Narumi's death. Following this, Shotaro keeps fighting the new menace from Bando and learns of its connection with Tokime, eventually learning she is Bando's sister. After understanding Tokime's loneliness, their relationship becomes intimate and the two comfort each other.

=== Video games ===
Shotaro has appeared in several video games. In Kamen Rider: Memory of Heroez, a 3D action game, he appears as Kamen Rider W, Joker and W FangJoker. The Narumi Detective Agency receives an email from a client requesting them to find "Professor Aida", with Shotaro leaving to investigate the island-based Sector City, which was once a tourist hotspot until an accident made it uninhabitable and emitting a strange energy. Shotaro works to uncover the mystery behind Aida and stop a Foundation X scientist from reviving old enemies and fallen allies as immortal super soldiers under his control.

A second port of Kamen Rider: Climax Heroes titled Kamen Rider: Climax Heroes W (仮面ライダー クライマックスヒーローズW（ダブル）, Kamen Raidā Kuraimakkusu Hīrōzu Daburu) for the Wii features Kamen Rider W as a playable character. The characters of the series have also been included in the 2025 video game Super Robot Wars Y.

== Reception ==
=== Cultural influence ===
Shotaro's character has been popular. Hiroshi Tanahashi of New Japan Pro-Wrestling is a fan of Kamen Rider W; in June 2010, he made a new costume designed after Kamen Rider W FangJoker's design and wore it at a match in Osaka on June 19.

=== Critical reception ===
Christopher Farris and Steve Jones from Anime News Network found Shotaro's portrayal in Fuuto PI instantly likable, describing him as a "giant dork from the get-go" and kind. His passion for being a detective, shown with details like fedora hats and noir novels, also appealed to the writers. They were surprised by Shotaro's encounter with Tokime for being more adult-oriented than Kamen Rider, which was aimed towards a younger audience. Shotaro and Philip's interactions were praised for helping to introduce newcomers to the series while rivaling the romantic overtones with Tokime. Antonio Mireles from Fandom Post was more critical, opining that while Shotaro is first introduced as a serious character, the anime premiere makes fun of his desire to become a detective to the point where the story was unenjoyable to watch.

Jonathon Greenall of CBR highlighted the series's potential to expand the Kamen Rider franchise into Western markets, opining that the manga explores Shotaro's detective work in an intriguing way, especially when meeting Tokime for the first time. Greenall speculated that Yoshimasa Hosoya would continue to replace Kiriyama in the anime as he had already done for the video games. In another article from CBR, Sage Ashford analyzed Shotaro and Philip's "Rider Kick" from W as particularly unique due to the way they fight together.

Reviewing Shotaro's portrayal in the manga series, Takato from Manga News praised the choice of cases investigated. In another review from the same website, Mercredi spoke positively of the writing for balancing episodic narratives with the development of an overarching plot. He noted that the second volume shifts focus away from Shotaro, which he felt created more dynamic interactions between Philip and Tokime. MassLunar of Manga Sanctuary enjoyed the development of Shotaro and Tokime's relationship.

Farris observed that iconic elements associated with its heroes—such as Shotaro and Philip's true forms—took time to be introduced, with their characters initially explored only in their human forms until the cliffhanger. Gracie Qu of Anitrendz praised the two leads and their voice actors for retaining the charm of the original series. She commended Hosoya's take on Shotaro, writing that his portrayal "brought out Shotaro's place as the older, more experienced, yet more passionate half of the duo [of him and Philip]". However, Qu criticized Tokime's diminished agency after joining Shotaro's team, which she felt harmed her characterization.

When it came to the film, Farris praised the depiction of the young Shotaro and his mentor Sokichi Narumi, describing it as providing an accessible origin story. Farris opined that Sokichi's appeal was enhanced by the story being told from Shotaro's point of view until Sokichi's death, an event which precipitated the awakening of Shotaro's identity as Kamen Rider W. Square Next enjoyed the performances of Hosoya and Ayumu Murase as Shotaro and his younger self respectively. He commented positively on the emotional impact of scenes involving Shotaro and Narumi, as well as the origin of Shotaro and Philip's Kamen Rider W form.

=== Analysis ===
Fillipo Cervelli from Oxford University argued that Shotaro's portrayal in Kamen Rider W marks a shift in Kamen Rider stories from fighting for the concepts of justice and goodness against evil to defending specific locations from known enemies. He opined that by remaining in one town and fighting only one evil organization, Shotaro's character, and the story as a whole, do not have to define what justice or evil is, and therefore risk alienating part of the audience.
