= Kamen Rider: Memory of Heroez =

2020 action role-playing video game

- Developer: Natsume-Atari
- Publishers: Bandai Namco Games; Daewon Media (South Korea)
- Producer: Kentaro Matano
- Series: Kamen Rider
- Engine: Unity
- Platforms: Nintendo Switch; PlayStation 4
- Release: JP: October 29, 2020; TW: October 29, 2020; HK: October 29, 2020; KOR: October 29, 2020; SEA: October 29, 2020
- Genres: Action role-playing game, Hack and slash
- Mode: Single-player

Kamen Rider: Memory of Heroez (仮面ライダー メモリーオブヒーローズ, Kamen Raidā Memorī obu Hīrōzu) is a video game based on the Kamen Rider Series, released for the Nintendo Switch and PlayStation 4 on October 29, 2020. It features the cast from Kamen Rider W, Kamen Rider OOO and Kamen Rider Zero-One.

The storyline heavily focuses on both Kamen Rider W and OOO, due to the absence of the Kamen Rider Zero-One cast aside from Zero-One himself.

== Plot ==
The Narumi Detective Agency receive an email from a client requesting them to find "Professor Aida" with Shotaro Hidari leaving to investigate the island-based Sector City, once a tourist hotspot until an accident made it uninhabitable while emitting a strange energy. Shotaro meets with Kamen Riders OOO and Zero-One to uncover the mystery behind Aida and stop a Foundation X scientist reviving their old enemies and fallen allies as immortal super soldiers under his control.

== Characters ==
- Zeus Dopant (ゼウスドーパント, Zeusu Dōpanto)

The game's main antagonist, a Foundation X scientist who assumed his current form using the Zeus Memory, overseeing Aida's eternal super soldier project using the foundation's research on Gaia Memories, O Medals, and Necro-Overs in hopes of reviving her. He created Sector City's Central Tower to energize the Core Energy, which revives both fallen enemies and allies of both Kamen Riders W and OOO. The tower he created also draws Kamen Rider Zero-One to the prime universe, which might explain why the other cast from Zero-One are not present in the game. Ultimately, he and other Kamen Riders found out that Aida was using them all along. Once Aida had been defeated by Zero-One, OOO, and W, Zeus ultimately join Ankh and Nazca in sacrificing their lives destroying Sector City and foiling Aida's plan.

- Ai (アイ)

An amnesiac artificial intelligence who is stuck inside a floating robot body, serving as the player's navigator before the near end of the game revealing her true identity. She was actually a receptacle of Aida (アイダ), a Foundation X scientist who established the enteral super soldier project before dying in a freak accident. But she transplanted her mind into Ai, initially a support drone for Sector City, manipulating the Kamen Riders and the Zeus Dopant before revealing herself while transferring her mind into Muchiri to achieve immortality as a Greeed. Philip was planning to fix Ai after the crisis is over, but the outcome after Aida was revived inside Muchiri caused him unable to find a way to fix her, despite having had aware of Aida's presence inside Ai from the beginning.

- Muchiri (ムチリ)

A man-made arthropod Greeed created by Zeus to revive Aida with unlimited access to Core Energy, Aida betraying Zeus once obtaining her power before being destroyed with her vessel. Some of the Core Medals that compose Muchiri are taken by Kamen Rider OOO to assume Mukachiri Combo form.

== Playable Characters ==
- Kamen Rider W

Forms: CycloneJoker, HeatJoker, LunaJoker, CycloneMetal, HeatMetal, LunaMetal, CycloneTrigger, HeatTrigger, LunaTrigger, CycloneJoker Xtreme

Note: CycloneJoker Gold Xtreme appears in the game's finale, but is not a playable form

- Kamen Rider W FangJoker
- Kamen Rider Joker
- Kamen Rider Accel

Forms: Base, Accel Booster, Trial

- Kamen Rider OOO

Forms: Tatoba Combo, Gatakiriba Combo, Latoratah Combo, Sagohzo Combo, Shauta Combo, Tajador Combo, Burakawani Combo, Mukachiri Combo, Putotyra Combo

Note: Mukachiri Combo debuted in this game

- Kamen Rider Birth (Shintaro Goto)

Forms: Base, Birth Day

- Kamen Rider Birth Prototype (Akira Date)
- Kamen Rider Zero-One

Forms: Rising Hopper, Flying Falcon, Shining Assault Hopper, Metal Cluster Hopper, Kamen Rider Zero-Two

Italic denotes for New Game+ exclusive character(s)/form(s)
Bold denotes for default form
Bold Italic denotes for final form

== Voice Cast ==
Rather than being reprised by their original actors, the cast from both Kamen Rider W and OOO are being voiced by different voice actors with Fumiya Takahashi returning to voice Zero-One. The Zeus Dopant and Ai are voiced by Takehito Koyasu and Yukari Tamura, respectively.

The voice actors from this game on Kamen Rider W cast side eventually reprises their roles in an anime sequel Fuuto PI.

== Reception ==
The Nintendo Switch version of Kamen Rider: Memory of Heroez sold 11,683 physical copies within its first week on sale in Japan, making it the eighth bestselling retail game of the week in the country. The PlayStation 4 version sold 9,286 physical copies in Japan throughout the same week.
