= Fuuto PI =

Japanese manga series

- First tankōbon volume cover, featuring Shotaro Hidari (front) and Philip (back)

風都探偵 (Fūto Tantei)
- Genre: Mystery, supernatural
- Created by: Shotaro Ishinomori; Hideaki Tsukada; Terada Katsuya
- Manga
- Written by: Riku Sanjo
- Illustrated by: Masaki Sato
- Published by: Shogakukan
- Magazine: Weekly Big Comic Spirits
- Original run: August 7, 2017 – present
- Volumes: 20
- Anime television series
- Directed by: Yousuke Kabashima
- Written by: Tatsuto Higuchi
- Music by: Kōtarō Nakagawa; Shuhei Naruse
- Studio: Studio Kai
- Licensed by: Crunchyroll: SEA: Muse Communication
- Original network: Tokyo MX, Sun TV, BS11, RKK
- Original run: August 1, 2022 – October 17, 2022
- Episodes: 12
- Anime film
- Fuuto PI: The Portrait of Kamen Rider Skull (2024)
- icon

Fuuto PI (Japanese: 風都探偵, Hepburn: Fūto Tantei) is a Japanese manga series written by Riku Sanjo and illustrated by Masaki Sato. It is a manga sequel to the 2009 tokusatsu live-action series Kamen Rider W, part of the Kamen Rider franchise. The manga was created by Sanjo in response to the immense popularity of Kamen Rider W, serving as a sequel while exploring darker stories. It has been serialized in Shogakukan's seinen manga magazine Big Comic Spirits since August 2017, with its chapters collected in 20 tankōbon volumes as of May 2026.

The series follows Shotaro Hidari, a private detective at the Narumi Detective Agency, and his partner, Raito "Philip" Sonozaki. Together, they solve cases and combine their abilities to transform into the superhero Kamen Rider W, defending Fuuto City from threats alongside new allies. Set two years after Kamen Rider W, the manga shifts focus more toward Shotaro rather than Philip. This led to the introduction of Tokime, an amnesiac woman who becomes Shotaro's assistant and is mysteriously connected to the new enemies they face. Since the manga was published in a seinen manga magazine, Sanjo incorporated more mature themes—content that would not have been possible in Kamen Rider W.

An anime television series adaptation by Studio Kai aired from August to October 2022. An anime film, titled Fuuto PI: The Portrait of Kamen Rider Skull, premiered in November 2024.

Critics praised the manga for its compelling mix of mystery and dynamic fight sequences. Similarly, the anime adaptation was lauded for effectively introducing the Kamen Rider concept to new audiences, despite being a sequel to the original television series.

== Plot ==
Taking place two years after the series finale of Kamen Rider W, Fuuto PI sees the return of Shotaro Hidari, a private detective who works at Narumi Detective Agency, and his partner Raito "Philip" Sonozaki, the last surviving member of the Sonozaki family who can access the Gaia Library as research for Shotaro's work. Together they transform into the superhero Kamen Rider W, who protects the city of Fuuto from Dopants, monsters created by items called Gaia Memories. They solve cases alongside their boss, Akiko Terui, who often joins their investigations with her husband, Ryu, a member of the police force who is also the Kamen Rider Accel.

One day, Shotaro encounters an amnesiac pink-haired woman named Tokime, who is being targeted by Dopants. After saving her, they decide to hire her at Narumi Detective Agency as their assistant. As Shotaro and Philip solve more cases, they gradually uncover Tokime's connection with a man, Yukiji Bando, known as Aurora Dopant, and her past life, along with the true potential of Gaia Memories' next stage used by Dopants in their human forms, dubbed High Dopes. Philip is able to confirm that the broken Joker Memory has not been used by Tokime before explaining everything he has learned about Bando, including his involvement with a group known as Foundation X.

As Tokime asks to be told everything about Kamen Riders, Gaia Memories, and Museum to better understand her connection with Shadow Fuuto, Shotaro tells her about "Begins Night". Ever since his childhood, Shotaro idolized detective Sokichi Narumi, who protected Fuuto as Kamen Rider Skull. When Shotaro became a teenager, the detective invited Shotaro to be his new assistant. One night, Sokichi accepted a job from the mysterious Shroud to rescue Philip from the Sonozaki family as he was being manipulated to create Dopant. During the mission, Sokichi sacrificed his Skull Memory to free Philip. After convincing Philip to come with him to decide his own fate and find his own atonement, Sokichi was shot in the back by the Sonozaki family's hired men and dies, telling Shotaro to continue in his place and giving him his white fedora. Upon seeing Shotaro's grief over Sokichi's death, Philip understood his sins and decided to become the next Kamen Rider alongside Shotaro.

== Production ==
Among the numerous installments based on the Kamen Rider franchise television series, the Kamen Rider W 2009–2010 Japanese tokusatsu drama remained one of the most popular even a year after its release, leading to demand for new works featuring it. Producer Hideaki Tsukada approached writer Riku Sanjo to helm a manga sequel. Tsukada expressed satisfaction with Sanjo's work, noting that it successfully retained the core elements that made Kamen Rider W appealing. However, Sanjo observed that certain characters from the television series could not be incorporated into the manga. Initially, the creative team was given considerable freedom in developing the story, but Sanjo believed collaboration would yield better results. He opted to work closely with Tsukada and Toei Company to refine the narrative. The manga format also allowed Sanjo to explore storytelling without the constraints of live-action special effects. When selecting a lead artist, Toei sought someone already familiar with Kamen Rider W to ensure consistency with the series' aesthetic. Sanjo praised the inclusion of Masaki Sato as the primary illustrator, while Katsuya Herada contributed to designing the villains. Due to the publisher's stipulations, protagonists Shotaro and Philip were not permitted to resemble caricatures of their live-action actors, requiring unique character designs.

Early in development, the team agreed that a simple spin-off would not suffice; instead, the manga aimed to encourage audiences to revisit the original series. While Kamen Rider as a franchise targets a broad demographic, the manga is published in a seinen manga magazine; this allowed Sanjo to explore mature themes, such as the dangers of criminal activity. Nevertheless, Sanjo did not find significant differences between writing Fuuto PI and Kamen Rider W, so he strove to introduce new ideas that would distinguish the former as a unique sequel. He was honored to learn that Fuuto PI was the first Kamen Rider manga serialized in a weekly magazine since Shotaro Ishinomori's Kamen Rider Black. Hideaki Tsukada frequently consulted Sanjo while reviewing story scenarios inspired by real crimes in Kyoto. Sanjo believed it was essential to establish a distinct identity for the manga compared to the live-action series. In Kamen Rider W, Philip had served as the narrative's central axis, but in Fuuto PI, Shotaro took on that role. To balance this shift, Sanjo introduced Tokime as Shotaro's new partner. While her dynamic with Shotaro mirrored his original relationship with Philip, Sanjo aimed to develop Tokime into a more humanized character over time. The serialization of Fuuto PI performed well commercially, leading to an extended run and a deeper exploration of the "Begins Night" arc, which delved into Shotaro's origins—particularly his childhood. Inspired by Western films like Die Hard (1988) and Blade Runner (1982), Sanjo created as many compelling villains as possible to enrich the story.

=== Adaptation ===
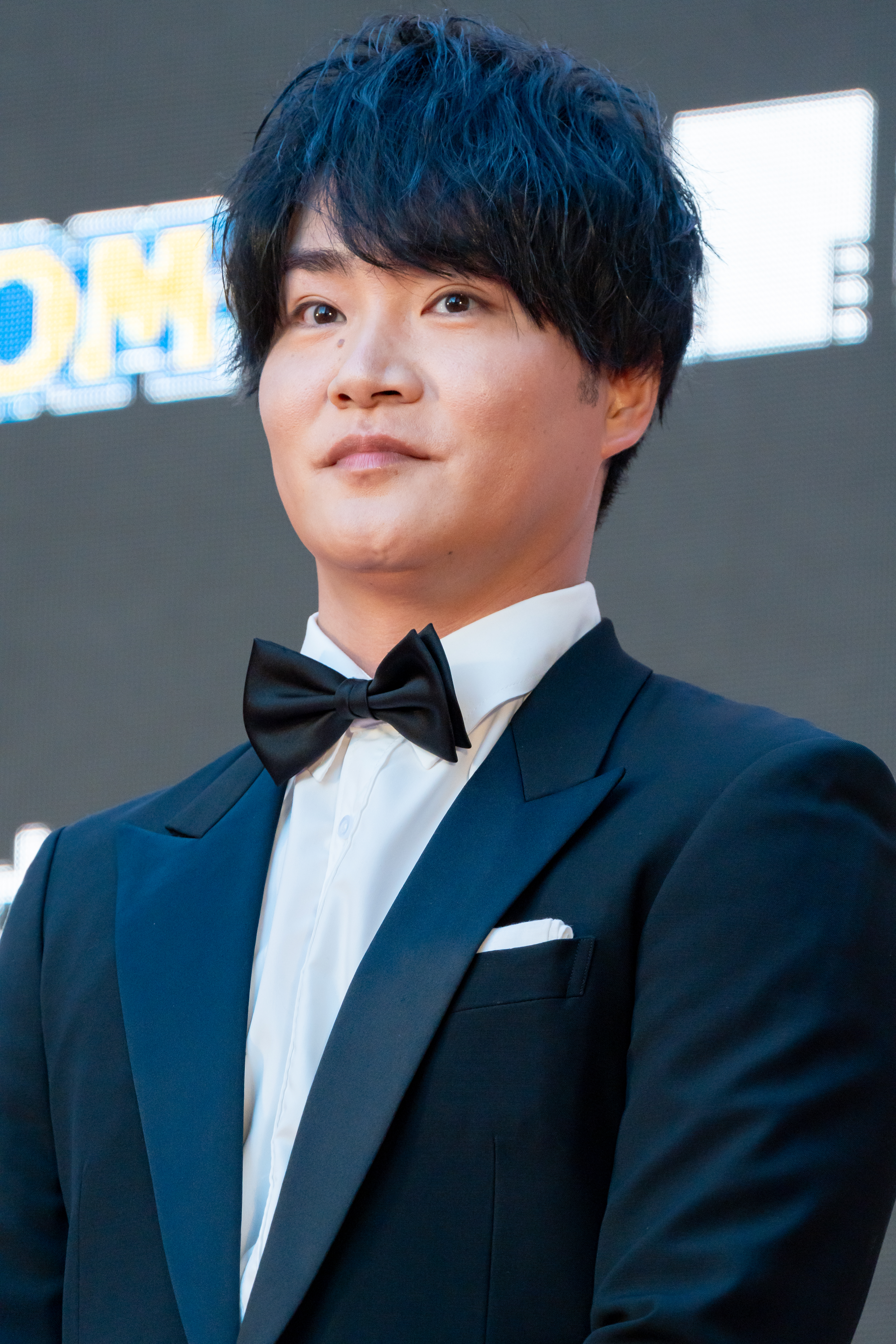
Yoshimasa Hosoya voices Shotaro in the series.

The subsequent anime adaptation was also designed with Western fans in mind. The anime was made by Studio Kai, with director Yosuke Kabashima being a fan of previous Kamen Rider series during his youth. He found doing the animation challenging, but he was glad he was able to draw the figure of Kamen Rider. In contrast to previous Kamen Rider works, Studio Kai wanted to emphasize Fuuto PI's more comical tone. Nevertheless, the anime has a tendency to change its mood. Kabashima wanted the audience to like it as much as they liked Kamen Rider W. The team struggled doing the character designs while Sayoko Yokoyama was in charge of checking the colors, most notably how everything changes between day and night. Producer Taisuke Furuya took it as his responsibility to handle the anime after contacting the manga authors and the Kamen Rider W producer.

Several cast members from the video game Kamen Rider: Memory of Heroez reprised their roles in the anime adaptation. Kabashima praised Yoshimasa Hosoya and Koki Uchiyama for their performances as Shotaro and Philip, respectively, leading to much of the game's voice cast being retained. Hosoya, who reprised his role as Shotaro, praised the anime's animation quality and voice acting, noting particular satisfaction in delivering his transformation line. He also expressed enthusiasm for the prospect of recording a second season.

== Media ==
=== Manga ===
Written by Riku Sanjo and illustrated by Masaki Sato, Fuuto PI started in Shogakukan's seinen manga magazine Big Comic Spirits on August 7, 2017. In January 2024, it was announced that the manga had entered its "last stage" and took a break in February before starting a new story arc in April. It took another hiatus in February 2025, returning in April; Another hiatus started in August and is set to resume with a new story arc in Q4. Shogakukan has collected its chapters into individual tankōbon volumes. The first volume was released on March 30, 2018. As of May 29, 2026, twenty volumes have been released.

=== Anime ===
An anime television series adaptation was announced on April 3, 2021. The series was animated by Studio Kai. Yousuke Kabashima is directing the series, with Tatsuto Higuchi handling the series's composition, Hidekazu Ebina designing the characters, and Kōtarō Nakagawa and Shuhei Naruse composing the series's music.

The series debuted on streaming platform U-Next on August 1, 2022, before premiering on Tokyo MX on August 8. The opening theme song is "Private Eye" by Big Gadgets featuring Aya Kamiki with Takuya, while the ending theme song is "Tsumi to Batsu to Underground" (罪と罰とアングラ; "Crime, Punishment, and the Underground") by Mitsuru Matsuoka and Kōji Kikkawa, who previously portrayed Kamen Riders Eternal and Skull. The series was initially licensed by Funimation but was moved to Crunchyroll following Sony's acquisition of the platform. Muse Communication, which owned and carried the Kamen Rider series in Taiwan and licensed the series in Southeast Asia.

==== Film ====
An anime film featuring the same cast and staff from the television series, subtitled The Portrait of Kamen Rider Skull (仮面ライダースカルの肖像, Kamen Raidā Sukaru no Shōzō), premiered in Japanese theaters on November 8, 2024. The film features the theme song "Niau Otoko ni Nare" (似合う男になれ; lit. 'Become a Worthy Man'), written and composed by Kōji Kikkawa, performed as his character Sokichi Narumi. The film takes place directly after the anime's final episode, and through flashbacks details the final moments of Sokichi Narumi/Kamen Rider Skull, leading up to the events of the first episode of Kamen Rider W. It grossed ¥80,114,875 (approximately US$513,600) during its opening weekend. Crunchyroll began streaming the film on November 13, 2025.

== Reception ==
=== Popularity ===
The series ranked 15th on Kono Manga ga Sugoi! 2019 ranking of Top 20 manga for male readers. It ranked eighth on Honya Club's "Nationwide Bookstore Employees' Recommended Comics of 2018".

=== Sales ===
By May 2018, the manga had 300,000 copies in circulation. By December 2018, the manga had 1.05 million copies in circulation. By October 2024, it had over 2.4 million copies in circulation.

=== Critical response ===
Takato from Manga News noted that it was one of the earliest tokusatsu manga to be released in France. The reviewer praised Sanjo's skill in crafting the cases investigated by Shotaro but criticized the first volume for failing to establish the series's core premise, as both Tokime's role and the city's looming threat remain unresolved by the end. In another review from the same website, critic Mercredi praised the writing for balancing episodic cases investigated by Shotaro's group while gradually developing a major overarching plot. The second volume shifts focus away from Shotaro, creating more dynamic interactions between Philip and Tokime, while the manga artist enhances the fight scenes with greater visual appeal. Jonathon Greenall of Comic Book Resources highlighted the series's potential to expand the Kamen Rider franchise into Western markets, noting the intriguing way the manga explores Shotaro's detective work. Damien Hilare of IGN noted that, due to its serialized origins, Fuuto PI leans more toward an adult audience than its predecessor, Kamen Rider W, which was geared toward younger viewers. This shift allows for mature elements not typically seen in the franchise—such as gore and fanservice. Regardless of its demographic focus, Hilare praised the manga's striking artwork, particularly in its character designs and dynamic fight scenes. MassLunar of Manga Sanctuary criticized the early handling of the villains for not being as engaging as those in previous volumes, but praised the development of Shotaro and Tokime's relationship, as well as the growing cast.

In reviewing the anime's premiere, Christopher Farris from Anime News Network noted that the series was accessible to newcomers despite being a sequel. However, the reviewer observed that iconic elements associated with its heroes—such as Shotaro and Philip's true forms—took time to be introduced, with their characters initially explored only in their human forms until the cliffhanger. While praising the treatment of the new character Tokime and her role in the narrative, Antonio Mireles from The Fandom Post noted that the series still had several issues, particularly as the early episodes might confuse newcomers. In a general overview of the series, Gracie Qu from Anime Trending mentioned being an existing fan of the original live-action series due to its strong character writing while still finding the anime adaptation accessible. Regarding differences, Qu noted that the anime incorporates more mature elements—such as Tokime's heightened sex appeal—without omitting the comedic or campy dialogue from the live-action version. The two leads and their voice actors were praised for retaining the charm of the original, and Bando was highlighted as a compelling villain. However, Qu criticized Tokime's diminished agency after joining Shotaro's team, as well as her voice actress's perceived lack of synergy with the role. In another review, Christopher Farris and Steve Jones from Anime News Network commended the series for being newcomer-friendly and appreciated Shotaro's dynamic with Tokime and Philip. Conversely, ThatNerdyBoliviane from Anime Feminist was more critical, faulting the anime for lacking a strong introductory hook—arguing that it missed key thematic elements present in Kamen Rider W—and condemning its reliance on fanservice.
